= Lucha House Party =

Professional wrestling tag team

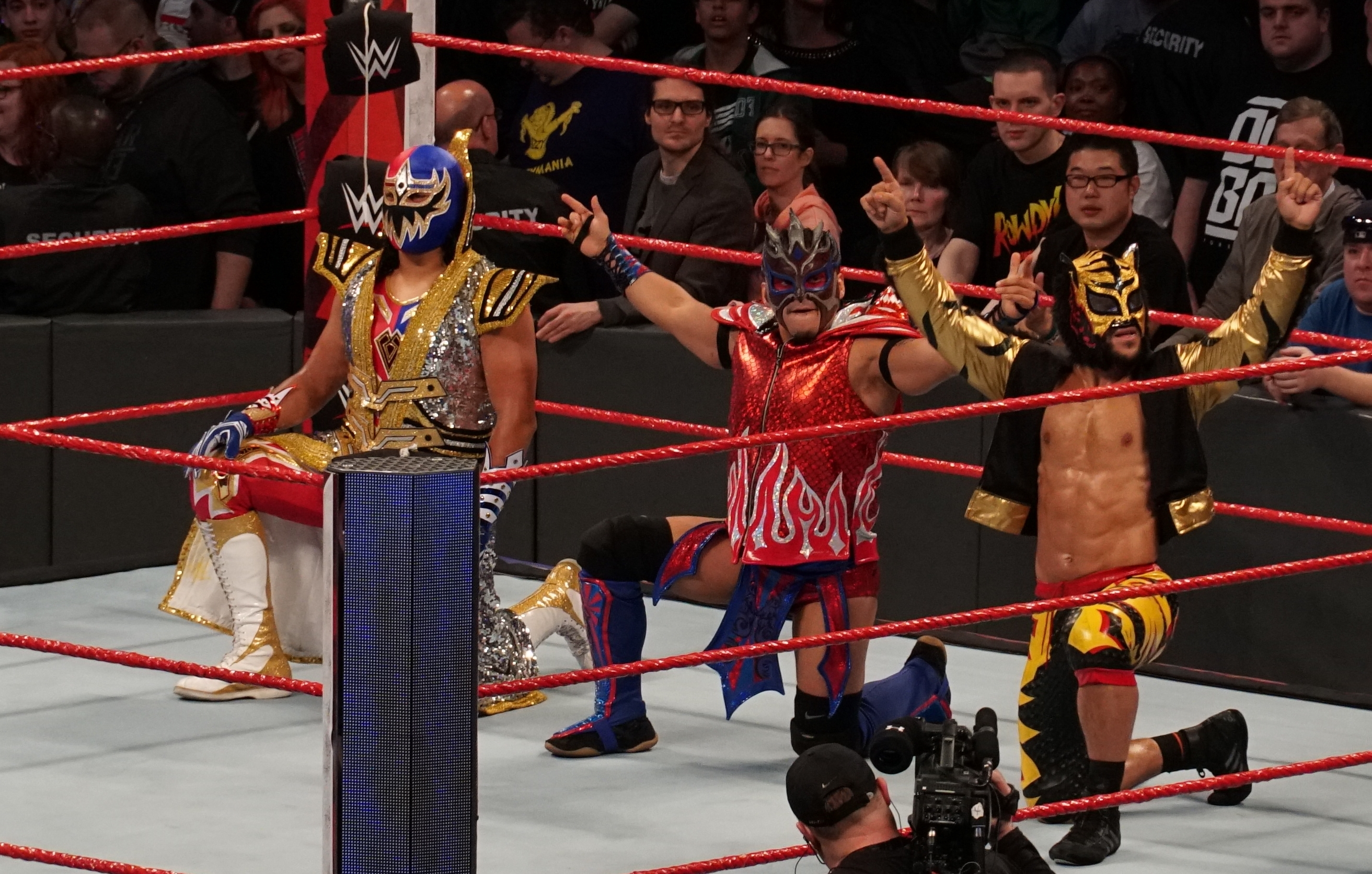
- Lucha House Party (from left to right: Gran Metalik, Kalisto, and Lince Dorado) in April 2018

Tag team
- Members: Kalisto; Gran Metalik; Lince Dorado
- Name: Lucha House Party
- Billed heights: Metalik: 5 ft 9 in (1.75 m); Dorado: 5 ft 7 in (1.70 m)
- Combined billed weight: 345 lb (156 kg)
- Debut: January 23, 2018
- Disbanded: November 4, 2021
- Years active: 2018–2021

Lucha House Party was a professional wrestling stable and later tag team that consisted of Kalisto, Gran Metalik, and Lince Dorado.

It was originally formed as a trio consisting of cruiserweights Kalisto, Metalik and Dorado on the 205 Live brand in 2018. The group was based on the fact that the three were masked high-flying luchadores and implemented various elements of Kalisto's former tag team The Lucha Dragons. The trio would compete on the Raw and SmackDown brands challenging for the Raw and SmackDown Tag Team Championships on many occasions between 2018 and 2020 until Kalisto was sidelined due to an injury. This led to Metalik and Dorado competing as a tag team for a while until Kalisto returned to WWE in the summer of 2020 but differences began arising within the group until Kalisto was separated from the team in the 2020 draft, which led to Lucha House Party becoming a tag team. As part of the group, Metalik and Dorado held the 24/7 Championship once each.

== History ==
=== The original trio (2018–2020) ===
Kalisto and Gran Metalik formed an alliance in the late 2017 while feuding with The Brian Kendrick and Gentleman Jack Gallagher on 205 Live. They first teamed together to defeat Kendrick and Gallagher on the November 25, 2017 episode of Main Event. The rivalry would fuel further when Kendrick and Gallagher attacked Kalisto and Metalik after matches on the November 28 and December 5 episodes of 205 Live. On the December 12 episode of 205 Live, Kendrick and Gallagher attacked Kalisto after Kalisto defeated Gallagher until Metalik made the save. The following week on 205 Live, Kalisto and Metalik defeated Kendrick and Gallagher via disqualification in a tag team match. This would lead to the formation of an alliance between Kalisto and Metalik. The duo were joined by the returning Lince Dorado on the January 23, 2018 episode of 205 Live as they defeated TJP, Tony Nese and Ariya Daivari in a six-man tag team match. Kalisto, Metalik and Dorado followed it up by defeating TJP, Drew Gulak and Gentleman Jack Gallagher in a six-man tag team match at Royal Rumble.

The group would soon begin competing under the name "Lucha House Party" feuding with Akira Tozawa and Hideo Itami as both teams exchanged wins until the rivalry culminated in a tornado tag team match between the two teams on the April 17 episode of 205 Live, which Metalik and Dorado won. Their next rivalry began against the trio of Drew Gulak, Gentleman Jack Gallagher and The Brian Kendrick as Lucha House Party defeated the trio on the June 12 episode of 205 Live, before losing to Gulak, Gallagher and Kendrick in a six-man elimination tag team match on the June 26 episode of 205 Live.

On the October 29 episode of Raw, Lucha House Party joined the Raw brand as Kalisto and Dorado defeated The Revival (Dash Wilder and Scott Dawson) in a tag team match. Lucha House Party continued to compete on Raw and 205 Live as they feuded with Revival on Raw, defeating them in various Lucha House Rules matches which stipulated that any member of Lucha House Party was allowed to compete. The entire Lucha House Party represented Team Raw against Team SmackDown in a losing effort at Survivor Series. Lucha House Party's winning streak finally ended against Revival on the January 14, 2019 episode of Raw as Revival defeated Metalik and Kalisto in a tag team match. After briefly feuding with Jinder Mahal and The Singh Brothers (Samir Singh and Sunil Singh), Lucha House Party began feuding with Lars Sullivan, losing to him via disqualification in a handicap match at Super Show-Down and a handicap elimination match on the June 10 episode of Raw. Metalik and Dorado would then begin a brief feud with Singh Brothers by trading wins with them on 205 Live.

After losing to The O.C. (AJ Styles, Luke Gallows and Karl Anderson) twice on Raw, Lucha House Party was drafted to the SmackDown brand in the 2019 draft on October 11. Kalisto debuted for SmackDown on the October 25 episode of SmackDown by defeating Drew Gulak while Metalik and Dorado debuted for the brand on the December 6 episode of SmackDown by competing in a fatal four-way elimination match to determine the #1 contenders for the SmackDown Tag Team Championship won by The Revival. Metalik and Dorado participated in a tag team turmoil match for the Tag Team World Cup at the Crown Jewel pay-per-view, where they were the first team to be eliminated by Dolph Ziggler and Robert Roode. At Survivor Series, Metalik and Dorado represented SmackDown in an interbrand tag team battle royal won by Ziggler and Roode while Kalisto represented SmackDown against Raw's Akira Tozawa and NXT's Lio Rush in a triple threat match for Rush's NXT Cruiserweight Championship, which Rush retained. On December 30, Kalisto injured his shoulder during a tag team match against The Revival at a live event, putting him out of action.

=== Tag team championship pursuits (2020–2021) ===
Following Kalisto's injury, Lucha House Party continued to perform as a tag team on SmackDown as Metalik and Dorado began pursuing the SmackDown Tag Team Championship, participating in title matches in the Elimination Chamber match at Elimination Chamber and Money in the Bank.

Lucha House Party entered a feud with Cesaro and Shinsuke Nakamura over the tag team titles as they traded wins with Cesaro and Nakamura in singles matches in August, leading to Lucha House Party earning a title shot at the tag team titles. Kalisto made his surprise return from injury on the August 14 episode of SmackDown to reunite with Metalik and Dorado. On the August 21 episode of SmackDown, Metalik and Dorado unsuccessfully challenged Cesaro and Nakamura for the SmackDown Tag Team Championship. After the match, Kalisto confronted Dorado until Metalik separated the two, planting the seeds for a split between the group. Lucha House Party earned another title shot against Cesaro and Nakamura as Kalisto and Metalik defeated them on the September 11 episode of SmackDown. Kalisto and Dorado unsuccessfully challenged Cesaro and Nakamura for the titles at Clash of Champions. After weeks of dissension, Kalisto was finally separated from Lucha House Party in the 2020 draft, in which he remained on SmackDown, where he remained until he was released from his WWE contract in April 2021, while Dorado and Metalik were drafted to the Raw brand on October 12. It was later reported that Kalisto had asked WWE management to be split from the group, as he gradually grew unhappy with being involved in a faction that struggled to get booked, especially as the stable was mainly Dorado's idea that had the support of Metalik.

On the November 9 episode of Raw, Metalik and Dorado each won the 24/7 Championship once during a seven-way match for the title but Akira Tozawa ended up winning in the end. On the December 30 episode of NXT, Lucha House Party defeated Legado Del Fantasma (Joaquin Wilde and Raul Mendoza) in a tag team match and then Metalik challenged Legado's leader Santos Escobar for the NXT Cruiserweight Championship at New Year's Evil, which Metalik failed to win. On the January 4, 2021 episode of Raw, Lucha House Party defeated the Raw Tag Team Champions The Hurt Business (Cedric Alexander and Shelton Benjamin) in a non-title match, thus earning a title shot against Alexander and Benjamin on the February 1 episode of Raw, which Lucha House Party failed to win. Lucha House Party entered the 2021 men's Dusty Rhodes Classic, where they defeated Imperium (Fabian Aichner and Marcel Barthel) in the opening round before losing to Legado del Fantasma in the quarter-final.

On November 4, 2021, Dorado and Metalik were released from their WWE contracts, thus ending Lucha House Party. It was later reported that Dorado and Metalik had requested their releases two months prior, as they were unhappy and frustrated after their WWE television appearances had fluctuated frequently over the last couple of years.

== Championships and accomplishments ==
- WWE
  - WWE 24/7 Championship (2 times) – Metalik (1), Dorado (1)
