= 2019 WWE Draft =

WWE's intra-brand draft

- The 2019 WWE Draft logo.

General information
- Sport: Professional wrestling
- Date(s): October 11–14, 2019
- Location: T-Mobile Arena (Oct. 11); Pepsi Center (Oct. 14)

Overview
- League: WWE
- Teams: Raw; SmackDown; NXT (outgoing only); 205 Live (outgoing only)

The 2019 WWE Draft was the fourteenth WWE Draft produced by the American professional wrestling promotion WWE between their Raw and SmackDown brands. Returning to its original name (the "WWE Draft") and a traditional draft format, it was the second draft of 2019, following April's Superstar Shake-up. The draft began on the October 11 episode of Friday Night SmackDown (in Paradise, Nevada) and concluded on the October 14 episode of Monday Night Raw (in Denver, Colorado), with SmackDown airing on Fox and Raw on the USA Network. It was the first draft in which the brand's television networks were presented as having an influence over WWE's drafting decisions.

2019 was the first year in which WWE held two drafts during the same calendar year. This was because of the issues of the Wild Card Rule introduced with April's Superstar Shake-up and also because of SmackDown's move to Fox in October—Raw and SmackDown were both previously on the USA Network. Over 70 wrestlers (both singles competitors and tag teams) from the Raw, SmackDown, NXT, and 205 Live rosters were eligible to be drafted to either Raw or SmackDown, including all Raw and SmackDown champions. Most draft picks were announced on the live broadcasts of SmackDown and Raw, while supplemental picks were announced afterwards via WWE's website. In storyline, wrestlers who were not drafted to either brand became free agents and could sign with the brand of their choosing. The Wild Card Rule also ended with this draft, although a similar but stricter interbrand rule, the Brand-to-Brand Invitation, was implemented in May 2020.

== Production ==
=== Background ===
The WWE Draft is an annual process used by the American professional wrestling promotion WWE while a brand extension, or brand split, is in effect. The original brand extension occurred from 2002 to 2011, while the second and current brand split began in 2016. During a brand extension, the company divides its roster into brands where the wrestlers exclusively perform for each brand's respective television show, and the draft is used to refresh the rosters of the brand divisions, typically between the Raw and SmackDown brands.

In April 2019, WWE held the Superstar Shake-up, which was the promotion's 13th draft which had a nontraditional format in which drafting decisions were made behind the scenes rather than on-screen. Shortly after the Shake-up, WWE's chairman and chief executive officer Vince McMahon introduced the Wild Card Rule, in which up to four wrestlers would be allowed to appear on the opposing brand's show by invitation for one night only with unsanctioned appearances penalized. Following this, however, the Wild Card Rule's stipulations were not enforced; the rules were immediately broken, with numerous wrestlers freely appearing on both shows weekly without any penalties, blurring the lines between the Raw and SmackDown brands. With SmackDown's move to Fox in October and Raw remaining on the USA Network (part of Comcast's NBCUniversal), WWE decided to hold a second draft for 2019 to definitively split the two brands. The draft was announced to occur on the October 11 and 14 episodes of SmackDown and Raw, respectively. Returning to its original name (the "WWE Draft") and a traditional draft format, personalities from Fox and NBCUniversal were scheduled to appear; the first time that television networks were presented as having an influence over WWE's drafting decisions. The Wild Card Rule also ended with this draft.

The picks were presented by personalities associated with Fox Sports and NBCUniversal properties, including Fox MLB analyst Alex Rodriguez, Saturday Night Live's Michael Che and Colin Jost (who both performed in the André the Giant Memorial Battle Royal at WrestleMania 35 earlier in 2019), Mr. Robot's Christian Slater, Fox NFL lead commentators Joe Buck and Troy Aikman, Mad Money host Jim Cramer, Fox MLB analysts Kevin Burkhardt and Frank Thomas, Fox NFL Sunday's Terry Bradshaw, Howie Long, Michael Strahan, Jimmy Johnson, and Tony Gonzalez, NFL analysts Ronde Barber, Charles Davis, Chris Spielman, and Daryl Johnston, Fox NFL Kickoff's Charissa Thompson, Michael Vick, and Peter Schrager, Big Noon Kickoff's Rob Stone (a former WWE 24/7 Champion), Brady Quinn, Reggie Bush, Matt Leinart, and Urban Meyer, Fox College Football analyst Joel Klatt, Dulé Hill from USA's Psych and Suits, James Roday from Psych, Marcus Lemonis from CNBC's The Profit, Margaret Josephs and Melissa Gorga from Bravo's The Real Housewives of New Jersey, Rodney Harrison and Chris Simms from NBC's Football Night in America, and Rebecca Lowe, Robbie Mustoe, and Kyle Martino from Premier League Live.

=== 2019 draft rules ===
The rules of the draft were posted on WWE's website on October 10. The list of eligible wrestlers was posted the same day. Over 70 wrestlers from the Raw, SmackDown, NXT, and 205 Live rosters, as well as tag teams, were eligible to be drafted to either Raw or SmackDown, including all Raw and SmackDown champions (although holders of the 24/7 Championship and WWE Women's Tag Team Championship were eligible to be drafted, they could appear on any brand until they lost their respective titles).

The rules of the draft were the following:

- Up to 30 picks were allotted on the October 11 SmackDown, while up to 41 picks were allotted on the October 14 Raw.
- For every two draft picks for SmackDown, Raw received three picks (due to SmackDown being a two-hour show, while Raw is three hours).
- Tag teams counted as one pick unless FOX or USA specifically only wanted a single member from the team as their pick.
- Any undrafted wrestlers became free agents and could sign with the brand of their choosing.

== Selections ==
The drafting pool was divided between the broadcasts of both shows, with up to 30 picks allotted on SmackDown and 41 on Raw. Any remaining picks from the respective draft pools were announced on WWE's website. Undrafted wrestlers (those not selected on the shows or announced via WWE.com) immediately became free agents and could sign with the brand of their choosing.

=== SmackDown (October 11) ===
There were four rounds of draft picks during Night 1 of the 2019 draft. WWE's Chief Brand Officer (CBO) Stephanie McMahon announced the draft picks for each round. Representing Raw, Universal Champion Seth Rollins' disqualification win over SmackDown's representative, Roman Reigns, earned Raw the first draft pick of the night.

Rnd.	Pick #	Wrestler(s)	Pre-draft brand	Post-draft brand	Role	Brand pick #
1	1	Becky Lynch	Raw	Raw	Female wrestler Raw Women's Champion	1
1	2	Roman Reigns	SmackDown	SmackDown	Male wrestler	1
1	3	The O.C. (AJ Styles, Luke Gallows, and Karl Anderson)	Raw	Raw	Male stable United States Champion (Styles)	2
1	4	"The Fiend" Bray Wyatt	Raw	SmackDown	Male wrestler	2
1	5	Drew McIntyre	Raw	Raw	Male wrestler	3
2	6	Randy Orton	SmackDown	Raw	Male wrestler	4
2	7	Sasha Banks	Raw	SmackDown	Female wrestler	3
2	8	Ricochet	Raw	Raw	Male wrestler	5
2	9	Braun Strowman	Raw	SmackDown	Male wrestler	4
2	10	Bobby Lashley	Raw	Raw	Male wrestler	6
3	11	Alexa Bliss	Raw	Raw	Female wrestler	7
3	12	Lacey Evans	Raw	SmackDown	Female wrestler	5
3	13	Kevin Owens	SmackDown	Raw	Male wrestler	8
3	14	The Revival (Scott Dawson and Dash Wilder)	Raw	SmackDown	Male tag team SmackDown Tag Team Champions	6
3	15	Natalya	Raw	Raw	Female wrestler	9
4	16	The Viking Raiders (Erik and Ivar)	Raw	Raw	Male tag team	10
4	17	Lucha House Party (Kalisto, Gran Metalik, and Lince Dorado)	Raw	SmackDown	Male stable	7
4	18	Nikki Cross	Raw	Raw	Female wrestler	11
4	19	Heavy Machinery (Otis and Tucker)	SmackDown	SmackDown	Male tag team	8
4	20	Street Profits (Angelo Dawkins and Montez Ford)	NXT	Raw	Male tag team	12

==== Night 1 supplementary picks ====
Eight additional picks were announced on WWE's website on October 13. Except for Apollo Crews, who was slated to be a part of the Night 2 pool, all wrestlers selected had initially gone undrafted during Night 1.

Wrestler(s)	Pre-draft brand	Role	Post-draft brand
Apollo Crews	SmackDown	Male wrestler	SmackDown
The B-Team (Bo Dallas and Curtis Axel)	SmackDown	Male tag team	SmackDown
Drew Gulak	205 Live	Male wrestler	SmackDown
EC3	Raw	Male wrestler	Raw
Eric Young	Raw	Male wrestler	Raw
Heath Slater	Raw	Male wrestler	SmackDown
Sin Cara	SmackDown	Male wrestler	Raw
Tamina	Raw	Female wrestler	SmackDown

=== Raw (October 14) ===
There were six rounds of draft picks during Night 2 of the 2019 draft. WWE's CBO Stephanie McMahon again announced the draft picks for each round. Number one Raw draft pick and Raw Women's Champion Becky Lynch defeated SmackDown representative Charlotte Flair, who replaced SmackDown draftee Sasha Banks (who was not medically cleared to compete), to earn Raw the first draft pick of the night.

Rnd.	Pick #	Wrestler(s)	Pre-draft brand	Post-draft brand	Role	Brand pick #
1	1	Seth Rollins	Raw	Raw	Male wrestler Universal Champion	1
1	2	Brock Lesnar with Paul Heyman	Raw	SmackDown	Male wrestler and manager WWE Champion (Lesnar)	1
1	3	Charlotte Flair	SmackDown	Raw	Female wrestler	2
1	4	The New Day (Big E, Kofi Kingston, and Xavier Woods)	SmackDown	SmackDown	Male stable	2
1	5	Andrade with Zelina Vega	SmackDown	Raw	Male wrestler and female manager	3
2	6	The Kabuki Warriors (Asuka and Kairi Sane)	SmackDown	Raw	Female tag team Women's Tag Team Champions	4
2	7	Daniel Bryan	SmackDown	SmackDown	Male wrestler	3
2	8	Rusev	SmackDown	Raw	Male wrestler	5
2	9	Bayley	SmackDown	SmackDown	Female wrestler SmackDown Women's Champion	4
2	10	Aleister Black	SmackDown	Raw	Male wrestler	6
3	11	Cedric Alexander	Raw	Raw	Male wrestler	7
3	12	Shinsuke Nakamura with Sami Zayn	SmackDown (Nakamura)	SmackDown	Male wrestler and manager Intercontinental Champion (Nakamura)	5
3	12	Shinsuke Nakamura with Sami Zayn	Raw (Zayn)	SmackDown	Male wrestler and manager Intercontinental Champion (Nakamura)	5
3	13	Humberto Carrillo^{1}	205 Live	Raw	Male wrestler	8
3	14	Ali	SmackDown	SmackDown	Male wrestler	6
3	15	Erick Rowan	SmackDown	Raw	Male wrestler	9
4	16	Buddy Murphy	SmackDown	Raw	Male wrestler	10
4	17	Dolph Ziggler and Robert Roode	SmackDown (Ziggler)	SmackDown	Male tag team^{2}	7
4	17	Dolph Ziggler and Robert Roode	Raw (Roode)	SmackDown	Male tag team^{2}	7
4	18	Jinder Mahal	SmackDown	Raw	Male wrestler	11
4	19	Carmella	SmackDown	SmackDown	Female wrestler	8
4	20	R-Truth	SmackDown	Raw	Male wrestler 24/7 Champion	12
5	21	Samoa Joe	Raw	Raw	Male wrestler	13
5	22	The Miz	Raw	SmackDown	Male wrestler	9
5	23	Akira Tozawa^{1}	205 Live	Raw	Male wrestler	14
5	24	King Corbin	Raw	SmackDown	Male wrestler	10
5	25	Shelton Benjamin	SmackDown	Raw	Male wrestler	15
6	26	Rey Mysterio	Raw	Raw	Male wrestler	16
6	27	Shorty Gable^{1}	SmackDown	SmackDown	Male wrestler	11
6	28	Titus O'Neil	Raw	Raw	Male wrestler	17
6	29	Elias	SmackDown	SmackDown	Male wrestler	12
6	30	Liv Morgan	SmackDown	Raw	Female wrestler	18

- ^{1} – Carrillo, Tozawa, and Gable originally went undrafted on Night 1, but were drafted during Night 2.
- ^{2} – Ziggler and Roode were Raw Tag Team Champions going into the event, but they lost the titles to Raw draftees The Viking Raiders prior to being drafted to SmackDown.

==== Night 2 supplementary picks ====
Ten additional picks were announced on WWE The Bump and via WWE's website on October 16. With the exception of Cesaro, who was slated to be a part of the Night 1 pool, all wrestlers selected had initially gone undrafted during Night 2.

Wrestler(s)	Pre-draft brand	Role	Post-draft brand
Cesaro	Raw	Male wrestler	SmackDown
Curt Hawkins and Zack Ryder	Raw	Male tag team	Raw
Dana Brooke	Raw	Female wrestler	SmackDown
Drake Maverick	205 Live	Male wrestler 205 Live General Manager	SmackDown
Fire and Desire (Mandy Rose and Sonya Deville)	SmackDown	Female tag team	SmackDown
The IIconics (Billie Kay and Peyton Royce)	SmackDown	Female tag team	Raw
Luke Harper	SmackDown	Male wrestler	SmackDown
Mojo Rawley	Raw	Male wrestler	Raw
No Way José	Raw	Male wrestler	Raw
Sarah Logan	Raw	Female wrestler	Raw

=== Post-draft trades ===
Following Night 2 on the premiere episode of Backstage on October 15, WWE's Chief Operating Officer (COO) Triple H announced a trade between Raw and SmackDown. Alexa Bliss and Nikki Cross were traded to SmackDown in exchange for future draft pick considerations. Some more trades were made the following year.

Trade #	Brand (from)	Wrestler(s)	Role	Brand (to)	Date	Notes
1	Raw	Alexa Bliss and Nikki Cross	Female tag team	SmackDown	October 15, 2019	Traded to SmackDown in exchange for future draft pick considerations.
2	Raw	Mojo Rawley	Male wrestler	SmackDown	March 13, 2020	Traded to SmackDown due to his relationship with National Football League player Rob Gronkowski, who appeared for the brand and hosted WrestleMania 36.
3	SmackDown	Apollo Crews	Male wrestler	Raw	April 6, 2020	Traded to Raw as his SmackDown contract was about to expire.
4	Raw	AJ Styles	Male wrestler	SmackDown	May 22, 2020	Traded for Dolph Ziggler and Robert Roode.
5	SmackDown	Dolph Ziggler and Robert Roode	Male tag team	Raw	June 22, 2020	Traded for AJ Styles.
6	SmackDown	Mustafa Ali	Male wrestler	Raw	July 20, 2020	After a seven-month hiatus, Ali returned on Raw, but no details were given for why he switched brands.
7	SmackDown	Mandy Rose	Female wrestler	Raw	September 12, 2020	As part of The Miz and John Morrison's scheme to steal Otis' Money in the Bank contract, Miz convinced management to trade Otis' on-screen girlfriend Mandy Rose to Raw.
8	SmackDown	Dana Brooke	Female wrestler	Raw	September 28, 2020	Traded to Raw to team with Mandy Rose. They debuted and defeated Natalya and Lana.

=== Free agents ===
Within WWE storyline, a "free agent" referred to a contracted wrestler who had not been assigned to one of the company's five brands at the time—Raw, SmackDown, NXT, NXT UK, or 205 Live. Several wrestlers were made free agents due to injury, inactivity, or simply not being drafted despite being an active member of the rosters. Wrestlers who became free agents could (kayfabe) sign with the brand of their choosing. The chart is organized by date.

Wrestler(s)	Pre-draft brand	Reason for not being drafted	Subsequent status	Date	Notes
Aiden English	SmackDown	Was not in either of the draft pools.	205 Live	October 15, 2019	English had been doing commentary for 205 Live since January with no appearances on SmackDown. After the conclusion of the draft, his WWE.com profile was updated to 205 Live.
Lio Rush	Raw	Was not in either of the draft pools.	NXT	October 15, 2019	Rush had been performing on NXT since mid-September and won the NXT Cruiserweight Championship two days prior to the draft. After the conclusion of the draft, his WWE.com profile was updated to NXT.
Alicia Fox	Raw	Was not in either of the draft pools.	Released	October 17, 2019	Fox's last match was in April and she made a brief appearance during Raw Reunion in July. On October 17, Fox's WWE.com profile was quietly moved to the alumni section, signaling her release from the company.
AOP (Akam and Rezar)	Raw	Undrafted during their draft pool (Night 2).	Raw	October 17, 2019	AOP signed with Raw as free agents after the draft.
Lana	SmackDown	Was not in either of the draft pools.	Raw	October 28, 2019	Lana and her husband Rusev had been inactive for a couple of months, but returned on Raw a few weeks before the draft; however, Lana betrayed Rusev and began a (storyline) love affair with Bobby Lashley, who was drafted to Raw (as was Rusev). Her own move to Raw was confirmed on October 28.
Paige	SmackDown	Was not in either of the draft pools. Was inactive due to neck surgery.	Unaffiliated	October 28, 2019	Was manager of The Kabuki Warriors (Asuka and Kairi Sane) prior to inactivity. Returned on the October 28 episode of Raw to resume her position, but was betrayed by the team. She then took a contributor role for WWE Backstage that premiered on November 5. She also appeared on SmackDown on March 20, 2020, to announce the SmackDown Women's Championship match for WrestleMania 36.
Matt Hardy	SmackDown	Was not in either of the draft pools.	Raw	November 25, 2019	Returned on the November 25 episode of Raw in a match against Buddy Murphy.
Sheamus	SmackDown	Was not in either of the draft pools. Was inactive due to concussion.	SmackDown	November 29, 2019	On the November 29 episode of SmackDown, Sheamus appeared in a vignette announcing that he would be returning to in-ring competition. Following weeks of vignettes, he made his return on the January 3, 2020, episode, attacking Shorty G.
The Ascension (Konnor and Viktor)	Raw	Were not in either of the draft pools.	Released	December 8, 2019	Last appeared in April. On December 8, The Ascension were released from the company.
Maryse	SmackDown	Was not in either of the draft pools. Was inactive due to maternity leave.	SmackDown	December 13, 2019	Was manager of her husband The Miz prior to inactivity, who was drafted to SmackDown during the draft. Made her first post-draft appearance with Miz in a pre-recorded segment that was shown on the December 13 episode of SmackDown.
The Usos (Jey Uso and Jimmy Uso)	Raw	Were not in either of the draft pools. Were inactive due to Jimmy's DUI arrest/charges that were incurred in July.	SmackDown	January 3, 2020	Returned during the January 3, 2020, episode of SmackDown, saving Roman Reigns from an attack by King Corbin and Dolph Ziggler.
Big Show	SmackDown	Was not in either of the draft pools. Was inactive due to hamstring injury.	Raw	January 6, 2020	Returned on the January 6, 2020, episode of Raw as Kevin Owens and Samoa Joe's mystery partner in a six-man tag team match against Seth Rollins and AOP (Akam and Rezar).
Naomi	Raw	Was not in either of the draft pools.	SmackDown	January 31, 2020	Last appeared in July. Returned at the 2020 Royal Rumble in the Women's Royal Rumble match before making her return to SmackDown on the January 31, 2020, episode of SmackDown to confront SmackDown Women's Champion Bayley.
Ruby Riott	Raw	Was not in either of the draft pools. Was inactive due to shoulder injury.	Raw	February 3, 2020	Returned on the February 3, 2020, episode of Raw and attacked her old Riott Squad stablemate Liv Morgan.
Jeff Hardy	SmackDown	Was not in either of the draft pools. Was inactive due to leg injury.	SmackDown	March 13, 2020	On the March 3 episode of WWE Backstage, Hardy confirmed that he had been backstage during SmackDown tapings the past few weeks, and had been cleared to return. He then had his return match on the March 13 episode, defeating King Corbin.
Nia Jax	Raw	Was not in either of the draft pools. Was inactive due to knee injury.	Raw	April 6, 2020	Returned on the April 6, 2020, episode of Raw in a match against Deonna Purrazzo.
The Colóns (Epico Colón and Primo Colón)	SmackDown	Were not in either of the draft pools.	Released	April 15, 2020	Last appeared in February 2019. They were working for World Wrestling Council while still under contract with WWE until April 15, 2020, when they were released from their WWE contract due to a cost-cutting measure.
Maria Kanellis	Raw	Was not in either of the draft pools. Was inactive due to maternity leave.	Released	April 15, 2020	Was involved in a storyline with her husband and 205 Live wrestler Mike Kanellis and the identity of her unborn child's father just prior to the draft. On November 30, 2019, Maria provided an update on her pregnancy, confirming she was on maternity leave, however, she was released alongside her husband on April 15, 2020, due to a cost-cutting measure.
Mickie James	SmackDown	Was not in either of the draft pools. Was inactive from performing due to leg injury.	Raw	August 10, 2020	Was doing commentary for Main Event during her recovery. Returned on the August 10, 2020, episode of Raw in a backstage interview and competed in her first match in over a year the following week against Natalya.
Ember Moon	SmackDown	Was not in either of the draft pools. Was inactive due to ankle injury.	NXT	October 4, 2020	Was appearing on WWE Backstage as a contributor until production halted in June 2020. On the November 19, 2019 episode, she stated she would be out of action for an indefinite period of time. Returned at NXT TakeOver 31 confronting NXT Women's Champion Io Shirai after her successful title defense against Candice LeRae.
Lars Sullivan	SmackDown	Was not in either of the draft pools. Was inactive due to knee injury.	SmackDown	October 9, 2020	Returned on SmackDown during Night 1 of the 2020 WWE Draft attacking Matt Riddle, Jeff Hardy, The Miz, and John Morrison after a tag team match between them.

== Aftermath ==
Two weeks after the draft, WWE held its pay-per-view event Crown Jewel. At the event, although the two had been drafted to separate brands, Raw draftee Seth Rollins defended the Universal Championship against SmackDown draftee "The Fiend" Bray Wyatt in a falls count anywhere match that could not be stopped for any reason; this was a rematch from Hell in a Cell, which was a Hell in a Cell match that ended by referee stoppage. The Fiend defeated Rollins to win the Universal Championship, and the title was subsequently transferred to the SmackDown brand, resulting in SmackDown having both the Universal and WWE Championships. This was quickly fixed, however. Also at Crown Jewel, SmackDown draftee Brock Lesnar retained the WWE Championship against Cain Velasquez, and following the match, he was attacked by Raw draftee Rey Mysterio, who was in Velasquez's corner. On the following night's episode of SmackDown, Lesnar's advocate Paul Heyman explained that since Lesnar and Mysterio were on two separate brands, they could not challenge each other. Heyman then declared that they were quitting SmackDown and transferring to Raw with the WWE Championship in order for Lesnar to seek revenge against Mysterio; a No Holds Barred match between the two was subsequently scheduled for Survivor Series.

Although the Wild Card Rule had ended with the 2019 draft, the theme of the next big pay-per-view, Survivor Series, has been brand supremacy since 2016, which would see the brands invading each other's shows in the build-up to the event. Prior to the draft, WWE's developmental territory NXT was promoted to being WWE's third major brand and it was subsequently added to the 2019 Survivor Series brand competition. This in turn resulted in wrestlers from the three brands invading each other's shows to build matches for the event. In a media call for NXT TakeOver: WarGames, WWE COO and NXT head Triple H said that viewers would see definitive brand division following Survivor Series.

Following the draft, Drake Maverick announced that although he had been drafted to SmackDown, he would still be serving as the general manager of the 205 Live brand; however, he stepped down from the position in April 2020 to return to in-ring competition. NXT general manager William Regal was announced to take over the managerial duties of 205 Live in addition to NXT; Maverick was also moved to NXT in the process. Maverick, however, was then released from his WWE contract due to a cost-cutting measure but signed a new contract after competing in the interim NXT Cruiserweight Championship tournament. Just after the draft, Shorty Gable's ring name was shortened to Shorty G, while just before Survivor Series, Ali returned to using his previous ring name of Mustafa Ali. On December 8, WWE announced the releases of free agents The Ascension (Konnor and Viktor), who had been inactive for several months, Raw wrestler Sin Cara, and SmackDown wrestler Luke Harper. Cara had requested his release in November, while Harper had requested his back in April, but was denied at that time. Free agent Matt Hardy returned to Raw in late November, but was then quietly moved to SmackDown in early January for unexplained reasons before being moved back to Raw later that same month. Hardy then allowed his contract to expire in March due to creative differences. In April 2020, as a result of the COVID-19 pandemic, WWE released several talent due to budget cuts as a result of the pandemic. These included WWE Hall of Famer Kurt Angle, Rusev, the aforementioned Drake Maverick, Zack Ryder, Curt Hawkins, Karl Anderson, Luke Gallows, Heath Slater, Eric Young, Rowan, Sarah Logan, No Way Jose, Mike Chioda, Mike Kanellis, Maria Kanellis, EC3, Aiden English, Lio Rush, The Colóns (Primo and Epico), Curtis Axel, and Cain Velasquez, as well as many other behind-the-scenes employees.

=== Brand-to-Brand Invitation ===
In May 2020, WWE initiated the Brand-to-Brand Invitation, in which wrestlers are allowed to appear and wrestle on an opposing brand "four times a year", or once every quarter (this excludes an appearance to set up the match, as seen with the respective Raw and SmackDown tag team champions to set up their interbrand match for the September 14, 2020, episode of Raw). Although somewhat similar to the abolished Wild Card Rule, the rules of the Brand-to-Brand Invitation have been followed more strictly.
