= 2020 WWE Draft =

WWE's intra-brand draft

- Promotional poster for the 2020 WWE Draft featuring Sasha Banks, Braun Strowman, Keith Lee, Roman Reigns, Drew McIntyre, and Asuka.

General information
- Sport: Professional wrestling
- Date: October 9–12, 2020
- Location: Amway Center

Overview
- League: WWE
- Teams: Raw; SmackDown; NXT (outgoing only)

The 2020 WWE Draft was the 15th WWE Draft produced by the American professional wrestling promotion WWE between their Raw and SmackDown brand divisions. The two-night event began on the October 9 episode of Friday Night SmackDown and concluded on the October 12 episode of Monday Night Raw. Both shows were broadcast from the WWE ThunderDome, hosted at the Amway Center in Orlando, Florida, with SmackDown airing on FOX and Raw on USA.

== Production ==
=== Background ===
The WWE Draft is an annual process used by the American professional wrestling promotion WWE while a brand extension, or brand split, is in effect. The original brand extension occurred from 2002 to 2011, while the second and current brand split began in 2016. During a brand extension, the company divides its roster into brands where the wrestlers exclusively perform for each brand's respective television show, and the draft is used to refresh the rosters of the brand divisions, typically between the Raw and SmackDown brands.

In 2019, the promotion held two drafts, the first in April and the second in October. The one in April, also known as the Superstar Shake-up, had an untraditional drafting format where drafting decisions were made behind the scenes and drafted wrestlers simply appeared on the brand without a major reveal, while the one in October returned to a traditional format, where draft picks were announced on the shows by a WWE official. The 2020 draft was officially announced during the Clash of Champions pay-per-view on September 27 and was scheduled to occur on the October 9 and October 12 episodes of SmackDown and Raw, respectively.

On August 19 during the NXT TakeOver XXX media call, WWE executive and NXT head Triple H said that the 2020 draft would also involve the NXT brand, but the official announcement that occurred during Clash of Champions stated that this draft would only be between Raw and SmackDown. During the NXT TakeOver 31 media call on September 30, a now unsure Triple H stated that he did not know if NXT would be involved. WWE's advertising just a couple days later affirmed that the draft would only be between Raw and SmackDown without NXT involvement. Like previous drafts, wrestlers, including all champions, were eligible to be drafted to either Raw or SmackDown. Due to the stipulations of the titles, holders of the WWE Women's Tag Team Championship and the 24/7 Championship could appear on either show, regardless of the brand they were drafted to, until they lost their respective title.

=== 2020 draft rules ===
The rules for the 2020 WWE draft were revealed by Fox Sports on October 8, which were the same as the previous draft in October 2019. Over 60 male and female wrestlers, as well as individual tag teams and stables, including current champions, were placed into the 2020 drafting pools. Over 20 wrestlers were announced as being eligible to be drafted on the October 9 episode of SmackDown and more than 30 wrestlers were eligible to be drafted on the October 12 episode of Raw. The rules of the draft were as follows:

- Due to the length of each show, for every two picks made by SmackDown, Raw received three (as SmackDown is two hours and Raw is three).
- Tag teams and stables counted as one pick unless either broadcast partner (Fox and NBCUniversal), in conjunction with WWE, wanted to specifically pick one wrestler from the group. (Note: Although WWE claims the draft picks are conducted by officials of Fox and NBCUniversal, the results are predetermined by WWE as the draft is a storyline.)
- Any undrafted wrestlers were immediately (in kayfabe) declared free agents and were able to sign with the brand of their choosing.

== Selections ==
=== Night 1: SmackDown (October 9) ===
There were four rounds of draft picks during Night One of the 2020 draft. WWE Chief Brand Officer (CBO) Stephanie McMahon announced the draft picks for each.

Rnd.	Pick #	Wrestler(s)	Pre-draft brand	Post-draft brand	Role	Brand pick #
1	1	Drew McIntyre	Raw	Raw	Male wrestler WWE Champion	1
1	2	Roman Reigns with Paul Heyman	SmackDown	SmackDown	Male wrestler and manager Universal Champion	1
1	3	Asuka	Raw	Raw	Female wrestler Raw Women's Champion	2
1	4	Seth Rollins	Raw	SmackDown	Male wrestler	2
1	5	The Hurt Business (MVP, Bobby Lashley, Cedric Alexander, and Shelton Benjamin)	Raw	Raw	Male stable United States Champion (Lashley)	3
2	6	AJ Styles	SmackDown	Raw	Male wrestler	4
2	7	Sasha Banks	SmackDown	SmackDown	Female wrestler	3
2	8	Naomi	SmackDown	Raw	Female wrestler	5
2	9	Bianca Belair	Raw	SmackDown	Female wrestler	4
2	10	Nia Jax and Shayna Baszler	Raw	Raw	Female tag team Women's Tag Team Champions (Note: The Women's Tag Team Championship is defended across the Raw, SmackDown and NXT brands regardless of the brand that the champions are drafted to.)	6
3	11	Ricochet	Raw	Raw	Male wrestler	7
3	12	Jey Uso	SmackDown	SmackDown	Male wrestler	5
3	13	Mandy Rose	Raw	Raw	Female wrestler	8
3	14	Rey Mysterio and Dominik Mysterio	Raw	SmackDown	Male tag team	6
3	15	John Morrison and the Miz	SmackDown	Raw	Male tag team	9
4	16	Kofi Kingston and Xavier Woods	SmackDown	Raw	Male tag team SmackDown Tag Team Champions (Note: Kingston and the returning Woods won the titles from Cesaro and Shinsuke Nakamura just before being drafted.)	10
4	17	Big E	SmackDown	SmackDown	Male wrestler	7
4	18	Dana Brooke	Raw	Raw	Female wrestler	11
4	19	Otis	SmackDown	SmackDown	Male wrestler Men's Money in the Bank contract holder	8
4	20	Angel Garza	Raw	Raw	Male wrestler	12

Notes

1. One stable was split up as a result of the first night: Big E remained on SmackDown while his New Day stablemates, Kofi Kingston and the returning Xavier Woods, were drafted to Raw, temporarily taking the SmackDown Tag Team Championships with them (they would later trade the titles over to The Street Profits (Angelo Dawkins and Montez Ford) moments after the then-Raw Tag Team Champions were drafted to SmackDown during Night Two to resolve any confusions).
2. One tag team was split up as a result of the draft: Otis remained on SmackDown while his Heavy Machinery tag team partner, Tucker, was drafted to Raw during the supplemental draft on Talking Smack the following day.

==== Supplemental picks: Talking Smack (October 10) ====
A supplemental draft took place on Talking Smack with wrestlers who were not drafted on Night 1.

Rnd.	Pick #	Wrestler(s)	Pre-draft brand	Post-draft brand	Role	Brand pick #
5	21	Humberto Carrillo	Raw	Raw	Male wrestler	13
5	22	Murphy	Raw	SmackDown	Male wrestler	9
5	23	Drew Gulak	SmackDown	Raw	Male wrestler	14
5	24	Kalisto	SmackDown	SmackDown	Male wrestler	10
5	25	Tucker	SmackDown	Raw	Male wrestler	15

Notes

1. One stable was split up as a result of the supplemental draft: Kalisto remained on SmackDown while his Lucha House Party stablemates, Gran Metalik and Lince Dorado, were drafted to Raw.

=== Night 2: Raw (October 12) ===
There were six rounds of draft picks during Night Two of the 2020 draft. WWE's CBO Stephanie McMahon again announced the draft picks for each.

Rnd.	Pick #	Wrestler(s)	Pre-draft brand	Post-draft brand	Role	Brand pick #
1	1	"The Fiend" Bray Wyatt	SmackDown	Raw	Male wrestler	1
1	2	Bayley	SmackDown	SmackDown	Female wrestler SmackDown Women's Champion	1
1	3	Randy Orton	Raw	Raw	Male wrestler	2
1	4	The Street Profits (Angelo Dawkins and Montez Ford)	Raw	SmackDown	Male tag team Raw Tag Team Champions	2
1	5	Charlotte Flair	Raw	Raw	Female wrestler	3
2	6	Braun Strowman	SmackDown	Raw	Male wrestler	4
2	7	Daniel Bryan	SmackDown	SmackDown	Male wrestler	3
2	8	Matt Riddle	SmackDown	Raw	Male wrestler	5
2	9	Kevin Owens	Raw	SmackDown	Male wrestler	4
2	10	Jeff Hardy	SmackDown	Raw	Male wrestler	6
3	11	Retribution (Mustafa Ali, T-Bar, Mace, Slapjack, and Reckoning)	Raw (Note: While T-Bar, Slapjack, Mace, and Reckoning were still listed as members of the NXT roster by WWE.com, it was revealed on the September 21, 2020 episode of Raw that they had received Raw contracts.)	Raw	Mixed gender stable	7
3	12	Lars Sullivan (Note: Sullivan was initially not included in either draft pool but was added after returning to WWE on the October 9, 2020 episode of SmackDown moments after Jeff Hardy and Matt Riddle defeated John Morrison and the Miz.)	SmackDown (Note: Despite going undrafted in the October 2019 Draft and being declared a free agent, Sullivan was listed by WWE.com as a SmackDown wrestler.)	SmackDown	Male wrestler	5
3	13	Keith Lee	Raw	Raw	Male wrestler	8
3	14	King Corbin	SmackDown	SmackDown	Male wrestler	6
3	15	Alexa Bliss	SmackDown	Raw	Female wrestler	9
4	16	Elias	SmackDown	Raw	Male wrestler	10
4	17	Sami Zayn	SmackDown	SmackDown	Male wrestler Intercontinental Champion	7
4	18	Lacey Evans	SmackDown	Raw	Female wrestler	11
4	19	Cesaro and Shinsuke Nakamura	SmackDown	SmackDown	Male tag team	8
4	20	Sheamus	SmackDown	Raw	Male wrestler	12
5	21	Nikki Cross	SmackDown	Raw	Female wrestler	13
5	22	Dolph Ziggler and Robert Roode	Raw	SmackDown	Male tag team	9
5	23	R-Truth	Raw	Raw	Male wrestler 24/7 Champion (Note: The 24/7 Championship is defended across all five WWE brands regardless of the home brand of the champion.)	14
5	24	Apollo Crews	Raw	SmackDown	Male wrestler	10
5	25	Dabba-Kato	Free agent (Note: Kato had been appearing on Raw Underground as a free agent since August 2020.)	Raw	Male wrestler	15
6	26	Titus O'Neil	Raw	Raw	Male wrestler	16
6	27	Carmella	SmackDown	SmackDown	Female wrestler	11
6	28	Peyton Royce	Raw	Raw (was later released, signed with Impact Wrestling)	Female wrestler	17
6	29	Aleister Black	Raw	SmackDown (was later released, signed with All Elite Wrestling)	Male wrestler	12
6	30	Akira Tozawa	Raw	Raw	Male wrestler	18

==== Supplemental picks: Raw Talk (October 12) ====
A supplemental draft took place on Raw Talk with wrestlers who were not drafted on Night 2.

Rnd.	Pick #	Wrestler(s)	Pre-draft brand	Post-draft brand	Role	Brand pick #
7	31	Lana	Raw	Raw	Female wrestler	19
7	32	Natalya	Raw	SmackDown	Female wrestler	13
7	33	Riddick Moss	Raw	Raw	Male wrestler	20
7	34	The Riott Squad (Ruby Riott and Liv Morgan)	Raw	SmackDown	Female tag team	14
7	35	Arturo Ruas	NXT (Note: Despite being assigned to the NXT brand, Ruas had been appearing on Raw Underground since August 2020.)	Raw (Note: Despite being drafted to the Raw brand, Ruas was later moved back to NXT.)	Male wrestler	21

=== Post-draft trades ===
Trade #	Brand (from)	Wrestler(s)	Role	Brand (to)	Date	Notes
1	Raw	Dabba-Kato	Male wrestler	SmackDown	April 16, 2021	During Night 2 of WrestleMania 37 on April 11, 2021, Dabba-Kato to help Apollo Crews win the Intercontinental Championship from Big E. Crews would then introduce Dabba-Kato as Commander Azeez the following Friday on SmackDown, with no mention made of his previous time as Dabba-Kato on Raw, thus transferring to the SmackDown brand.
2	Raw	Mandy Rose	Female wrestler	NXT	July 13, 2021	Separated from her tag team partner, Dana Brooke. Rose made a surprise return to the NXT brand, observing a match between Sarray and Gigi Dolin.
3	Raw	Naomi	Female wrestler	SmackDown	August 27, 2021	
4	SmackDown	Big E	Male wrestler	Raw	September 13, 2021	SmackDown's Big E is the 2021's Mr. Money in the Bank. Cashed in the contract on the September 13, 2021 episode of Raw and defeated Raw's Bobby Lashley to win the WWE Championship after Lashley had successfully defended the title against Randy Orton, thus transferring to the Raw brand.
5	Raw	Riddick Moss	Male wrestler	SmackDown	September 24, 2021	Moss made a surprise return by aligning with Happy Corbin and attacking Kevin Owens, thus transferring to the SmackDown brand, The following week, Moss was re-introduced as Corbin's associate, Madcap Moss.

=== Free agents ===
Within WWE storyline, a "free agent" referred to a contracted wrestler who had not been assigned to one of the company's five brands at the time—Raw, SmackDown, NXT, NXT UK, or 205 Live (the latter two were subdivisions of NXT). Several wrestlers were made free agents due to injury, inactivity, or simply not being drafted despite being an active member of the rosters. Wrestlers who became free agents could (kayfabe) sign with the brand of their choosing. The chart is organized by date.

Wrestler(s)	Pre-draft brand	Reason for not being drafted	Subsequent status	Date	Notes
Retaliation	Raw (Note: While not listed as a member of the Raw roster by WWE.com, it was revealed on the September 21, 2020 episode of Raw that Retaliation received a Raw contract.)	Was removed from Retribution and the draft pool (Night 2).	NXT	October 9, 2020	Was quietly moved back to NXT under her previous name of "Mercedes Martinez" and formally made her return to the brand on the December 23, 2020 episode of NXT.
Shorty G	SmackDown	Undrafted during their draft pool (Night 1).	SmackDown	October 12, 2020	Shorty G's signing was announced on WWE's social media platforms.
Lucha House Party (Gran Metalik and Lince Dorado)	SmackDown	Undrafted during their draft pool (Night 1).	Raw	October 12, 2020	Lucha House Party's signing was announced during WWE's Monday Night Raw Watch Along special.
Billie Kay	Raw	Undrafted during their draft pool (Night 2).	SmackDown	October 13, 2020	Kay's signing was announced on WWE's social media platforms.
Erik	Raw	Undrafted during their draft pool (Night 2).	Raw	October 13, 2020	Erik's signing was announced on WWE's social media platforms.
Tamina	SmackDown	Undrafted during their draft pool (Night 2).	SmackDown	October 13, 2020	Tamina's signing was announced on WWE's social media platforms.
Zelina Vega	Raw	Undrafted during their draft pool (Night 2).	SmackDown	October 13, 2020	
Jimmy Uso	SmackDown	Was not included in either of the draft pools.	SmackDown	October 23, 2020	Was inactive from performing due to a knee injury. Returned to the SmackDown brand during the October 23, 2020 episode of SmackDown as part of a storyline involving his brother Jey Uso and cousin Roman Reigns. Uso would make few appearances during this period due to his injury, but was cleared and made his formal return on the May 7, 2021 episode of SmackDown.
The Forgotten Sons (Steve Cutler and Wesley Blake)	SmackDown	Was not included in either of the draft pools.	SmackDown	December 4, 2020	The group was taken off television in June 2020 after Jaxson Ryker tweeted his support for U.S. President Donald Trump during the Black Lives Matter movement and the George Floyd protests. On the December 4, 2020 episode of SmackDown, Blake and Cutler, without Ryker, made their return where they accompanied King Corbin to the ring. They were subsequently renamed "The Knights of the Lone Wolf."
Jaxson Ryker	SmackDown	Was not included in either of the draft pools.	Raw	December 7, 2020	The Forgotten Sons, the group which Jaxson Ryker was a part of, was taken off television in June 2020 after Ryker tweeted his support for U.S. President Donald Trump during the Black Lives Matter movement and the George Floyd protests. Ryker returned without his partners and aligned with Elias during the December 7, 2020 tapings of Main Event, which is a sub-show of Raw.
Sonya Deville	Free agent	Storyline fired	Assistant to Adam Pearce	January 1, 2021	Had been inactive since her loss at SummerSlam in August 2020 in which she was forced to leave WWE (in reality, she was given time off due to a legal battle with a stalker that had broken into her home). On the January 1, 2021 episode of SmackDown, Deville was seen walking backstage with commentator Corey Graves confirming that she had been re-instated on the SmackDown brand. She then took on an assistant role to WWE official Adam Pearce before becoming an official herself.
Big Show	Raw	Was not included in either of the draft pools.	Raw (was later released, signed with All Elite Wrestling)	January 4, 2021	Had only made sporadic appearances pre-draft. Returned during the special "Legends Night" episode of Raw on January 4, 2021
Mickie James	Raw	Undrafted during their draft pool (Night 1).	Raw	January 4, 2021	Returned during the special "Legends Night" episode of Raw on January 4, 2021.
Jinder Mahal	Raw	Was not included in either of the draft pools.	Raw	January 22, 2021	Was inactive due to a knee injury. He wrestled at the tri-branded Superstar Spectacle event (aired January 26), but his brand status was unknown until he made his formal return during the May 3, 2021 tapings of Main Event, which is a sub-show of Raw.
Andrade	Raw	Undrafted during their draft pool (Night 2).	Released	March 21, 2021	Andrade had wrestled a match on the October 12 episode of Raw (Night 2 of the draft), but went undrafted. On March 21, 2021, Andrade was released from his WWE contract .
Ivar	Raw	Was not included in either of the draft pools.	Raw	April 12, 2021	Was inactive due to neck injury. Returned on the April 12, 2021 episode of Raw, reuniting with his Viking Raiders tag team partner Erik.
Maryse	SmackDown	Was not included in either of the draft pools.	Raw	April 12, 2021	Last appeared on the December 13, 2019 episode of SmackDown. Returned on the April 12, 2021 episode of Raw, appearing in a segment with her real-life husband The Miz on his talk-show segment "Miz TV."
Bo Dallas	SmackDown	Was not included in either of the draft pools.	Released	April 15, 2021	Last appeared on the November 15, 2019 episode of SmackDown. On April 15, 2021, Dallas was released from his WWE contract.
Mojo Rawley	SmackDown	Was not included in either of the draft pools.	Released	April 15, 2021	Last appeared on the June 19, 2020 episode of SmackDown. On April 15, 2021, Rawley was released from his WWE contract.
Becky Lynch	Raw	Was not included in either of the draft pools. Was inactive due to maternity leave.	SmackDown	August 21, 2021	Last appeared on the May 11, 2020 episode of Raw. Made a surprise return at SummerSlam and defeated Bianca Belair in an impromptu match to win the SmackDown Women's Championship.

== Aftermath ==
During Night 1 of the draft, The New Day's Kofi Kingston and Xavier Woods won the SmackDown Tag Team Championship. Immediately after their win, they were drafted to Raw, splitting Big E from The New Day as Big E remained on SmackDown; this also resulted in Kingston and Woods taking SmackDown's tag titles to Raw. However, on Night 2 of the draft, Raw Tag Team Champions The Street Profits (Angelo Dawkins and Montez Ford) were drafted to SmackDown. Later that night, WWE official Adam Pearce had the two teams trade titles to keep the branded championships on their respective brands, thus New Day became the Raw Tag Team Champions and Street Profits became the SmackDown Tag Team Champions.

For several months prior to the draft, Seth Rollins and his disciple Murphy had been feuding with the Mysterios (Rey Mysterio and Dominik Mysterio). After Rollins was drafted to SmackDown, he had thought that was the end of their feud; however, the Mysterios, as well as Murphy, were also drafted to SmackDown. The feud continued over the following month, which also saw Rey's daughter Aalyah get involved romantically with Murphy, who turned on Rollins to join with the Mysterios.

In early September, The Miz and John Morrison began a feud with Otis over Otis' Money in the Bank contract. Although drafted to separate brands, the feud continued and Otis was scheduled to defend the contract against The Miz at Hell in a Cell on October 25, where Miz defeated Otis to win the Money in the Bank contract.

For a couple of months prior to the draft, then-SmackDown wrestler Drew Gulak got involved in segments over the 24/7 Championship on pay-per-view as well as episodes of Raw, where he won the title a couple of times. After Gulak was drafted to Raw, he continued pursuing the 24/7 Championship. Shortly after his drafting to Raw, Matt Riddle's ring name was shortened to Riddle. Just the same on SmackDown, Shorty G returned to using his original ring name, Chad Gable. Also, despite being drafted to Raw, Arturo Ruas made no post-draft appearances on Raw and was returned to NXT the following month. Similarly, although Dabba-Kato had been drafted to Raw, he did not make a single appearance on the brand after the draft. His first post-draft appearance came during Night 2 of WrestleMania 37 on April 11, 2021, where he helped Apollo Crews win the Intercontinental Championship. Dabba-Kato was subsequently transferred to the SmackDown brand where Crews introduced him under his new ring name, Commander Azeez.

During Night 2 of the draft, after both Elias and Jeff Hardy had been drafted to Raw, Elias made his first on-screen appearance in five months and attacked Hardy, as Elias believed it was Hardy who caused him to miss the previous five months. Back in May, Hardy was involved in a feud with Sheamus, who tried exploiting Hardy's past issues with alcohol. During one segment, Elias was hit with a car outside of the WWE Performance Center, which Sheamus tried to frame on Hardy. Upon Elias' return during the draft, he believed that Hardy was not framed and did in fact hit him with the car. The two then feuded over the next few weeks.

Due to the COVID-19 pandemic, which resulted in less work for wrestlers as WWE was now only doing television and pay-per-view and ceased touring, many talent took to third-party platforms such as Twitch, Cameo, and YouTube to earn supplemental income. In September, WWE issued a statement to their talent that they could no longer use these platforms, and gave the talent 30 days to close down their accounts or face fines, suspension, or termination; it was later clarified that talent could not use their ring names or characters for these other platforms, but they must get permission from WWE in order to use the platforms. Some talent, such as Paige and Zelina Vega, took opposition to this, and expressed their support of a wrestler's union. Vega was then released by WWE on November 13, allegedly because of her opposition to the company's policy on using third-party platforms and her support of unionization. In mid-2021, however, Vega was rehired, making her return as an in-ring competitor on the July 2 episode of SmackDown where she was entered into the women's Money in the Bank ladder match.

Although Steve Cutler and Wesley Blake were signed to SmackDown in December 2020 and aligned with King Corbin as "The Knights of the Lone Wolf," this teaming would not last long as Cutler was released from his WWE contract in February 2021. King Corbin also reverted to his original Baron Corbin ring name in June 2021 after he lost his King of the Ring crown to Shinsuke Nakamura. In August 2021, Corbin declaring himself "filthy rich" and changed his new ring name to Happy Corbin.

The January 4, 2021 special "Legends Night" episode of Raw would also be Big Show's final appearance in WWE, as on February 19, he was moved to the alumni section on WWE.com and he then signed with rival promotion All Elite Wrestling under his real name, Paul Wight, on February 24. Big Show was reportedly unhappy in WWE and they were not able to come to terms on a new agreement following his appearance at Legends Night.

Following WrestleMania 37 in April 2021, many other wrestlers, a couple of which were still listed as "free agents," were released from their WWE contracts. These included Samoa Joe, Billie Kay, Peyton Royce, Mickie James, Chelsea Green, Tucker, Kalisto, Mojo Rawley, Bo Dallas, and Wesley Blake. On May 19, NXT wrestlers Jessamyn Duke and Vanessa Borne were released, followed by Velveteen Dream the next day. On June 2, further releases were made, which included Braun Strowman, Aleister Black, Lana, Murphy, Ruby Riott, and NXT's Santana Garrett. Joe, however, was re-signed by the company and made his return on the June 15 episode of NXT, becoming a special enforcer and assistant to NXT General Manager William Regal. Further NXT and 205 Live names were released on June 25, including Tony Nese, Ariya Daivari, Breezango (Tyler Breeze and Fandango), Ever-Rise (Chase Parker and Matt Martel), August Grey, The Bollywood Boyz (Samir Singh and Sunil Singh), Arturo Ruas, Curt Stallion, Marina Shafir, and Killian Dain. In June, Braun Strowman was released from his contract, followed by Bray Wyatt in July. However, Strowman returned in September 2022 and was assigned to SmackDown, followed by Wyatt in October, who was also assigned to SmackDown. A mysterious masked figure named Uncle Howdy also started appearing with Wyatt, which has been reported to be Bo Dallas, thus making his return. Chelsea Green made her return at the 2023 Royal Rumble as a surprise entrant in the women's Royal Rumble match.
