= Elimination Chamber (2020) =

WWE pay-per-view and livestreaming event

- Promotional poster featuring Sarah Logan, Asuka, Natalya, Liv Morgan, Shayna Baszler, and Ruby Riott
- Promotion: WWE
- Brand(s): Raw; SmackDown
- Date: March 8, 2020
- City: Philadelphia, Pennsylvania
- Venue: Wells Fargo Center
- Attendance: 14,853

WWE event chronology
← Previous; Super ShowDown	Next → WrestleMania 36

Elimination Chamber chronology
← Previous; 2019	Next → 2021

The 2020 Elimination Chamber (known as No Escape in Germany) was a professional wrestling pay-per-view (PPV) and livestreaming event produced by WWE, held for wrestlers from the promotion's main roster brands, Raw and SmackDown. It was the 10th Elimination Chamber event and took place on March 8, 2020, at the Wells Fargo Center in Philadelphia, Pennsylvania, which was the second Elimination Chamber to not take place in February, after the 2015 event. The event centered on the Elimination Chamber match, a type of roofed steel cage that surrounds the ring and ringside area with no disqualifications; the objective is to eliminate all other opponents either by pinfall or submission with championship implications at stake.

Eight matches were contested at the event, including one on the Kickoff pre-show. There were two Elimination Chamber matches, one each for Raw and SmackDown. In the main event, NXT's Shayna Baszler won Raw's women's Elimination Chamber match to become the number one contender against Becky Lynch for the Raw Women's Championship at WrestleMania 36. In other prominent matches, Aleister Black defeated AJ Styles in a no disqualification match, The Artist Collective (Cesaro, Sami Zayn, and Shinsuke Nakamura) defeated Braun Strowman in a 3-on-1 handicap match, with Zayn pinning Strowman to win SmackDown's Intercontinental Championship, and The Miz and John Morrison retained the SmackDown Tag Team Championship in SmackDown's tag team Elimination Chamber match. This was also the first Elimination Chamber event with no men's world titles contested on the card.

This was WWE's last PPV and livestreaming event to take place in front of a live ticketed crowd before the World Health Organization (WHO) declared COVID-19 a pandemic on March 11. The promotion subsequently moved the majority of its shows for Raw and SmackDown, including WrestleMania 36, to the WWE Performance Center in Orlando, Florida with no fans in attendance; NXT remained at its home venue of Full Sail University in Winter Park, Florida. From August, they had virtual fans by way of the WWE ThunderDome bio-secure bubble, with NXT subsequently moving to the Performance Center in October. WrestleMania 37, which was held in April 2021, was WWE's first event since Elimination Chamber to take place in front of a live ticketed audience, although to a limited capacity, and in mid-July, the company resumed live touring with full capacity crowds, with the first PPV and livestreaming event following this being Money in the Bank.

== Production ==
=== Background ===
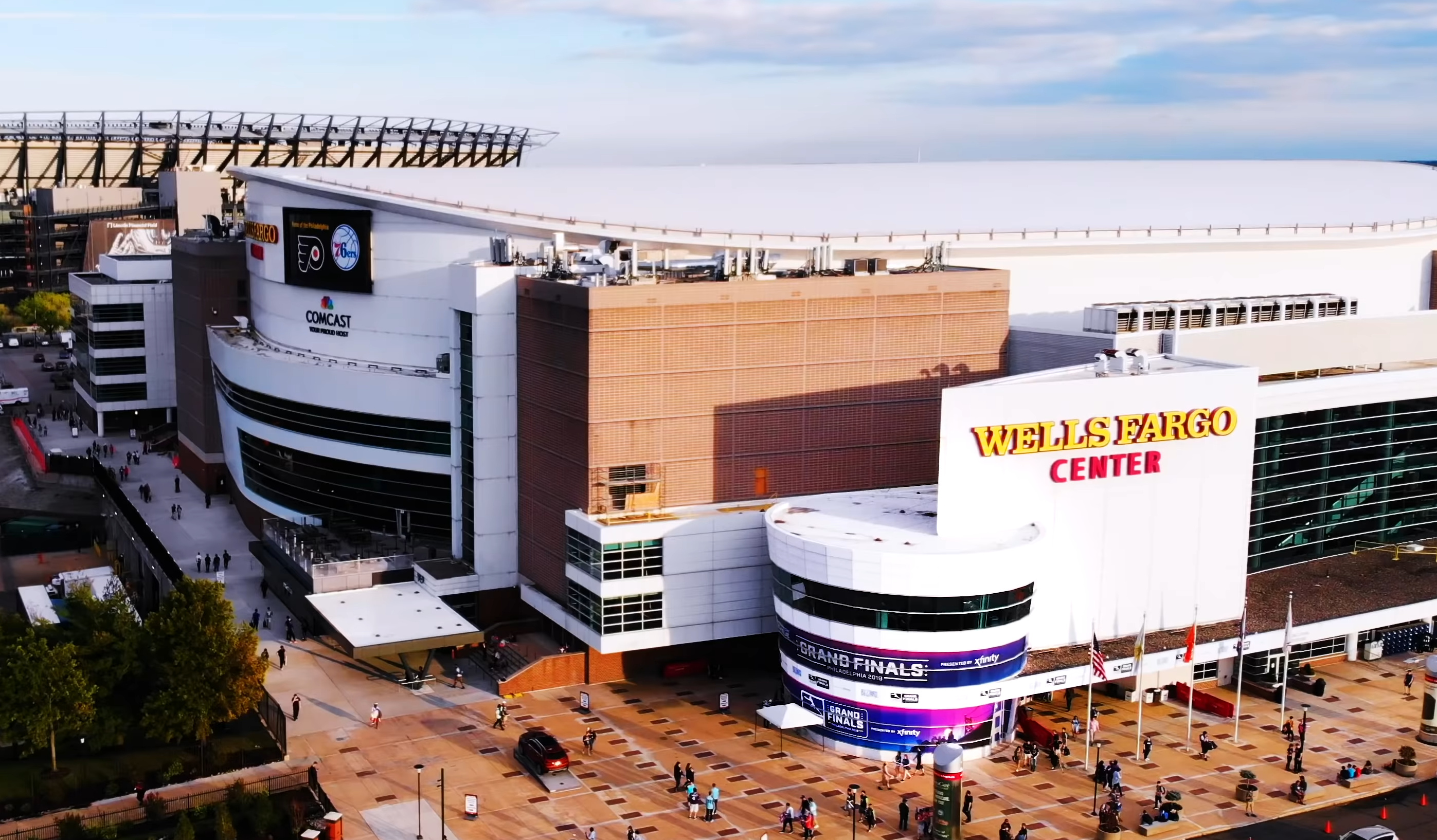
The 10th Elimination Chamber event was held at the Wells Fargo Center in Philadelphia, Pennsylvania.

Elimination Chamber is a professional wrestling event first produced by WWE in 2010. It has been held every year since, except in 2016, generally in February. It was originally broadcast exclusively via pay-per-view (PPV) before it began simultaneously livestreaming on the WWE Network in 2015. The concept of the event is that one or two main event matches are contested inside the Elimination Chamber, either with championships or future opportunities at championships at stake. Announced on November 15, 2019, the 10th Elimination Chamber event was moved to March due to Super ShowDown being held in February, with Elimination Chamber taking place on March 8, 2020, at the Wells Fargo Center in Philadelphia, Pennsylvania and featured wrestlers from the Raw and SmackDown brand divisions. Tickets went on sale on December 13, 2019.

The Elimination Chamber match is an elimination-based match contested in a type of large roofed steel cage that surrounds the wrestling ring with an elevated platform around the ring. Within the Chamber are four inner pods, one behind each ring post. The match is contested by six participants. Two wrestlers start the match, while the other four are held within each inner pod with one selected randomly to enter the match at regular intervals, which continues until all four have been released. The objective is to eliminate all other opponents by pinfall or submission, and there are no disqualifications or count-outs. In the case of a tag team Elimination Chamber match, the rules are mostly the same, except two teams (four wrestlers) start the match, both members of a team are released from their pod at the same time, and only one person from a team has to be eliminated to eliminate both members of that team.

In 2011 and since 2013, the show has been promoted as "No Escape" in Germany as it was feared that the name "Elimination Chamber" may remind people of the gas chambers used during the Holocaust; it was promoted as "No Way Out" in 2010 and 2012.

=== Storylines ===
The event comprised eight matches, including one on the Kickoff pre-show, that resulted from scripted storylines. Results were predetermined by WWE's writers on the Raw and SmackDown brands, while storylines were produced on WWE's weekly television shows, Monday Night Raw and Friday Night SmackDown.

On February 17, a Raw-branded women's Elimination Chamber match was scheduled for the event to determine the number one contender against Becky Lynch for the Raw Women's Championship at WrestleMania 36. Announced for the match were Natalya, Liv Morgan, Asuka, Ruby Riott, Sarah Logan, and NXT's Shayna Baszler, who reignited her feud with Lynch from Survivor Series by ambushing her on the previous week's episode of Raw.

On the January 31 episode of SmackDown, Braun Strowman defeated Shinsuke Nakamura (with Sami Zayn and Cesaro in his corner) to win the Intercontinental Championship. On the February 28 episode, a contract signing for a title match at Elimination Chamber was held. Tired of hearing Zayn's rants, Strowman signed the contract, stating that regardless of who else signed it, he knew he would basically be facing all three at the event. Zayn seized the opportunity and he, Nakamura, and Cesaro all signed the contract, making it a 3-on-1 handicap match for Strowman's Intercontinental Championship.

At Super ShowDown, The Miz and John Morrison defeated The New Day (Big E and Kofi Kingston) to capture the SmackDown Tag Team Championship. The following night on SmackDown, it was announced that Miz and Morrison would defend the title in a tag team Elimination Chamber match at the event. The challengers announced for the match were The New Day (Big E and Kingston), The Usos (Jey Uso and Jimmy Uso), Heavy Machinery (Otis and Tucker), Lucha House Party (Gran Metalik and Lince Dorado), and Dolph Ziggler and Robert Roode. The following week, Ziggler and Roode won a tag team gauntlet match to enter the chamber last.

At Super ShowDown, Seth Rollins and Murphy retained the Raw Tag Team Championship against The Street Profits (Angelo Dawkins and Montez Ford). On the following Raw, The Street Profits were given one final opportunity where they defeated Rollins and Murphy to win the title. Later backstage, Rollins and Murphy challenged The Street Profits to a championship rematch at Elimination Chamber, which was made official.

On the February 24 episode of Raw, The O.C. (AJ Styles, Luke Gallows, and Karl Anderson) attacked Aleister Black backstage. Black then challenged Styles to a match for the following week, however, Styles said that Black would have to defeat Gallows and Anderson before he could face Styles. Black defeated both Gallows and Anderson in separate matches, after which, Styles faced and defeated Black. A no disqualification rematch between Black and Styles was then scheduled for Elimination Chamber.

On the Royal Rumble Kickoff pre-show, Andrade (accompanied by Zelina Vega) retained the United States Championship against Humberto Carrillo. Carrillo then won a rematch on the following Raw by disqualification due to Vega's interference. Following the match, Carrillo performed a Hammerlock DDT on Andrade onto the exposed concrete, just as Andrade had previously done to Carrillo back in December. With Andrade absent over the next month, Vega brought up her new associate, Angel Garza from NXT, Carrillo's real life cousin. The two then feuded where Garza defeated Carrillo at Super ShowDown. On the March 2 episode of Raw, Carrillo teamed with Rey Mysterio to face Andrade and Garza, where Carrillo pinned Andrade. This earned Carrillo another United States Championship match against Andrade at Elimination Chamber.

Backstage during the February 21 episode of SmackDown, Daniel Bryan was approached by Drew Gulak, who claimed to know all of Bryan's weaknesses. On the March 6 episode, Bryan challenged Gulak to a match at Elimination Chamber, which was later made official for the event.

== Event ==
Other on-screen personnel
Role:	Name:
English commentators	Michael Cole (SmackDown)
English commentators	Corey Graves (SmackDown)
English commentators	Tom Phillips (Raw)
English commentators	Jerry Lawler (Raw)
English commentators	Byron Saxton (Raw)
Spanish commentators	Carlos Cabrera
Spanish commentators	Marcelo Rodríguez
German commentators	Carsten Schaefer
German commentators	Tim Haber
German commentators	Calvin Knie
Ring announcers	Greg Hamilton (SmackDown)
Ring announcers	Mike Rome (Raw)
Referees	Danilo Anfibio
Referees	Jason Ayers
Referees	Shawn Bennett
Referees	John Cone
Referees	Darrick Moore
Referees	Eddie Orengo
Referees	Chad Patton
Referees	Charles Robinson
Interviewers	Charly Caruso
Interviewers	Kayla Braxton
Interviewers	Sarah Schreiber
Pre-show panel	Jonathan Coachman
Pre-show panel	Charly Caruso
Pre-show panel	David Otunga
Pre-show panel	Peter Rosenberg

=== Pre-show ===
During the Elimination Chamber Kickoff pre-show, The Viking Raiders (Erik and Ivar) faced Curt Hawkins and Zack Ryder. The end saw The Viking Raiders perform the Viking Experience on Ryder, and Ivar pinned him to win the match.

=== Preliminary matches ===
The actual pay-per-view opened with Daniel Bryan facing Drew Gulak. In the end, Bryan applied the Yes Lock on Gulak, who passed out, thus winning the match by technical submission.

Next, Andrade (accompanied by Zelina Vega) defended the United States Championship against Humberto Carrillo. During the match, Vega removed the floor padding to expose the concrete and Andrade attempted to perform a Hammerlock DDT on Carrillo onto the concrete, however, Carrillo countered and performed a Suplex on Andrade. In the end, after exchanging roll-ups, Andrade pinned Carrillo, while holding his tights, to retain the title.

After that, The Miz and John Morrison defended the SmackDown Tag Team Championship in SmackDown's tag team Elimination Chamber match. The challengers were The New Day (Big E and Kofi Kingston), The Usos (Jey Uso and Jimmy Uso), Heavy Machinery (Otis and Tucker), Lucha House Party (Lince Dorado and Gran Metalik), and Dolph Ziggler & Robert Roode. The Usos and The New Day started the match. Lucha House Party entered third, followed by Miz and Morrison, and then Heavy Machinery. Lucha House Party were eliminated by Heavy Machinery after they performed the Compactor on Dorado. Due to winning the gauntlet match on the previous episode of SmackDown, Ziggler and Roode entered last. They began to target Heavy Machinery, specifically Otis, who attempted to perform a clothesline on Ziggler, who was inside a pod; however, Ziggler avoided Otis, who obliterated the pod and ended up outside the chamber. Tucker tried taking on Ziggler and Roode himself, but was overpowered and Roode performed a Glorious DDT on Tucker to eliminate Heavy Machinery. Big E then performed a Big Ending on Roode, followed by double splashes from The Usos on both Ziggler and Roode to eliminate them. Kingston attempted a splash from the top of a pod, but missed, after which, Miz and Morrison pinned him to eliminate The New Day. In the climax, after exchanging roll-ups, Miz and Morrison pinned Jimmy, with Morrison pinning Jimmy with a roll-up and Miz's legs on the rope to retain the titles.

In the fourth match, Aleister Black faced AJ Styles (accompanied by Luke Gallows and Karl Anderson) in a no disqualification match. In the closing moments, as Black attempted a Black Mass on Styles, Gallows and Anderson interfered, though Black fought them off. The three eventually ambushed Black. As Gallows and Anderson held Black in position for Styles to perform a Phenomenal Forearm, The Undertaker's gong sounded and the lights went out. When they illuminated, Undertaker was choking Gallows and Anderson. Styles then attempted the Phenomenal Forearm on Undertaker, who caught Styles and performed a Chokeslam on him. The lights then went out again with Undertaker vanishing after they returned. Black then performed a Black Mass on Styles to win the match.

Next, The Street Profits (Angelo Dawkins and Montez Ford) defended the Raw Tag Team Championship against Seth Rollins and Murphy (accompanied by Akam and Rezar). In the end, Kevin Owens appeared in the crowd and walked ringside eating popcorn, distracting Rollins, which allowed The Street Profits to momentarily take out Rollins. Ford then performed a From The Heavens on Murphy to retain the titles. Following the match, Owens performed a Stunner on Rollins.

In the penultimate match, Braun Strowman defended the Intercontinental Championship against Sami Zayn, Shinsuke Nakamura, and Cesaro in a 3-on-1 handicap match. During the match, Nakamura and Cesaro subdued Strowman, allowing Zayn to tag himself in and attack Strowman; however, every time Strowman rose to his feet, Zayn retreated. In the closing moments, Nakamura and Cesaro held Strowman in place, allowing Zayn to perform a Helluva Kick on Strowman to win the match for his team. Since Zayn pinned Strowman, he won the Intercontinental Championship, which was his first title since his move from NXT in 2016 and his first title win since NXT TakeOver: R Evolution in 2014.

=== Main event ===
The main event was Raw's women's Elimination Chamber match between Natalya, Liv Morgan, Asuka, Ruby Riott, Sarah Logan, and NXT's Shayna Baszler in which the winner earned a Raw Women's Championship match against Becky Lynch at WrestleMania 36. Natalya and Riott started the match, followed by Logan as the third entrant. Baszler entered fourth and dominated her opponents, first eliminating Sarah Logan, making her pass out with the Kirifuda Clutch. Ruby Riott and Natalya tapped out shortly after. As Morgan entered fifth, Baszler slammed her against the cage and the chamber pod, after which, Liv Morgan passed out at the hands of Shayna Baszler who applied the Kirifuda Clutch on her while taunting Asuka, who entered last. After Baszler and Asuka went back-and-forth in an attempt to apply their respective submission holds, Baszler applied the Kirifuda Clutch on Asuka, who passed out, thus eliminating Asuka to win the match and earning the Raw Women's Championship match against Lynch at WrestleMania. With this win, Baszler became the first Elimination Chamber match winner to single-handedly eliminate all other opponents, as well as tie the record for most eliminations in a single match at five (previously set by Braun Strowman in the 7-man Elimination Chamber match at the 2018 event).

== Reception ==
The event received a generally positive response, with many of the matches praised for their storytelling and match quality.

The opening match between Drew Gulak and Daniel Bryan was highly praised. Brian Mazique of Forbes gave the match a perfect A+ rating, the highest of the night, stating that "from a technical standpoint, it had just about everything you could ask. The transitions, sells and move diversity were off the charts. Both Bryan and Gulak brought their personalities to the ring, and the chemistry between the two was apparent. Both men had their moments to shine, but Bryan rightfully got the victory in a match that showcased the two performers well. This was by far the match of the night". Chris Mueller of Bleacher Report gave the match an A rating (the highest rating of the night, shared with Andrade vs. Carrillo), stating: "These are two of the best technicians in WWE today, and this was exactly the kind of fight you would expect them to have", and hoped that the match was only "the first of many encounters between these two". Pro Wrestling Torch gave a rating of 3.5/5, calling it an "excellent mat-based match. Really compelling start to finish, even with a more deliberate pace than usual for the WWE style. Not crazy about those bumps Bryan takes on the back of his head, though". Elton Jones of Heavy also gave it a 3.5/5 rating, claiming that "Drew Gulak shined brightly here. I knew going into this dream match that this was meant to be a breakout moment for Drew and Daniel Bryan did everything in his power to help him reach that lofty goal. [...] This match was decidedly good, but it needed 10 more minutes to truly reach the level of great. Maybe we'll get that extended time request in their rematch at some point. Even still, Drew came out looking better than ever thanks to Daniel's unselfish efforts".

Andrade vs. Carrillo was also praised, although most reviewers criticized its booking, pointing out that Carrillo's repeated losses against Andrade hurt the feud's credibility. Forbes gave it a B− rating, calling it "well-wrestled" but stating: "Why has Carrillo been given this opportunity to repeatedly challenge Andrade if he's never going to go over? That's not to say Andrade shouldn't still be the U.S. Champion, but at this point, all of the matches in this program are beginning to look the same. Both men are strong workers with great athleticism, but it's time for a new feud." Heavy gave it a 3.5/5 rating, stating that while the match was good, seeing Carrillo lose to Andrade again made it "disappointing". Conversely, Bleacher Report praised the feud, stating "It almost seems impossible for Andrade and Carrillo to have a bad match. Every encounter has been better than the last and this was no exception". He gave the match an A rating.

The tag team Elimination Chamber match was praised for its performances, storytelling, pacing and memorable spots. Bleacher Report gave it a A− rating, stating "The more people you add to a match, the harder it is to keep track of everything. Even when it got up to 10 Superstars in the chamber at once, they did a great job making sure we could follow the action. [...] This won't go down as the best Chamber match in history, but it had a lot of fun moments and told multiple stories at the same time. It kept the momentum going for what was already a great show". Forbes gave the match a B+ rating, stating that "the performers made it look about as good as possible. Also, the Otis, Dolph and Mandy Rose element added some additional layers that helped increase the enjoyment." However, he pointed out that the result was predictable and took some of the tension away. Heavy rated the match 4/5, calling it "great" and praising its storytelling and performances, in particular from Lucha House Party; they later named it match of the night.

Styles vs. Black was praised for its physicality and the two's performances, as well as for its booking. Bleacher Report gave it a B+ rating, stating: "Black and Styles worked well together and Taker's involvement was a nice surprise. The Deadman and Styles appear to be heading toward a match at WrestleMania, but for now, Black picked up a big win to give him some momentum". Forbes gave the match a C+ rating, calling it "fairly entertaining, but I wish it hadn't been forced into place amidst the obvious setup for Styles vs. The Undertaker at WrestleMania 36. [...] Quite honestly, a Styles-Black feud would be so much more interesting, and we saw evidence of that on Sunday in this match". Heavy rated the match 3.5/5, stating that "This match truly came to life once the action headed to the outside – we got a pretty sick table spot to boot. Everyone in the arena knew The Undertaker was coming out at some point, which thankfully happened once The O.C. jumped all over Aleister. His fun run-in and that nasty Black Mass Aleister delivered to AJ to finish off this bout was pretty cool to watch unfold".

The women's Elimination Chamber match received mixed reviews. Bleacher Report gave the women's elimination chamber match a B− rating. Brent Brookhouse and Adam Silverstein of CBS Sports gave the match a B+ rating, stating: "If the intention of the Elimination Chamber was to establish Baszler as a threat to Becky Lynch's Raw women's title reign, this match cleared that bar by a mile. It may not go down as the most memorable or action-packed Chamber match in WWE history, but in telling the story of the new force in town, it was effective". Forbes gave the match a B rating, stating: "It was a performance that was about as dominant as you'll ever see in the EC, and it showed how much WWE believes in Baszler as a supervillain". Wade Keller of Pro Wrestling Torch called the women's Elimination Chambers "the least entertaining match of the night" and stated that "it took away a lot of whatever benefit Baszler got for dominating like that". Heavy gave the match a low rating of 1/5, calling the match predictable, stating that "It started off with some uninspired action, didn't get any more interesting once Shayna started tearing through a bunch of jobbers and even resulted in a disappointing first time meeting between Shayna and Asuka. This completely shit the bed and has severely hampered Shayna and her hype heading into 'Mania 36 against Becky Lynch".

== Aftermath ==
Elimination Chamber would be WWE's final PPV and livestreaming event to be held in-person with spectators before the World Health Organization (WHO) declared COVID-19 a pandemic on March 11. The next day, WWE canceled all touring shows indefinitely, and moved Raw, SmackDown, and future PPV and livestreaming events to the WWE Performance Center in Orlando, Florida with no audience beginning March 13. NXT's shows continued to be held at NXT's home base of Full Sail University in Winter Park, Florida, but also with no fans. In August, the company relocated Raw and SmackDown's shows to a bio-secure bubble called the WWE ThunderDome, which was first hosted at Orlando's Amway Center. In October, NXT moved to the Performance Center in a similar setup called the Capitol Wrestling Center. The ThunderDome was then relocated to Tropicana Field in St. Petersburg, Florida in December and then the Yuengling Center in Tampa, Florida in April 2021. WrestleMania 37, which was held on April 10 and 11, 2021, was WWE's first event during the pandemic to have live ticketed fans, although to a limited capacity, and in mid-July, WWE resumed a live touring schedule with Money in the Bank being the first PPV and livestreaming event back with full capacity crowds. In addition, this was the final Elimination Chamber to be held in the United States with ticketed spectators until the 2026 event.

=== Raw ===
For costing him his match against Aleister Black, AJ Styles taunted The Undertaker on the following night's episode of Raw by bringing up his wife Michelle McCool, blaming her for why Undertaker keeps coming back to wrestle. Styles then challenged Undertaker to a match at WrestleMania 36. A contract signing for the match was conducted the following week. Styles then challenged Undertaker to a Boneyard match that Undertaker accepted, cutting a promo akin to his "American Bad Ass" gimmick (circa 2000–2003).

Also on the following Raw, Seth Rollins took on Aleister Black. The match ended in a disqualification win for Black after interference from Murphy. Black fought back, but was outnumbered by Murphy, Rollins, and AOP (Akam and Razar) until The Viking Raiders (Erik and Ivar) and The Street Profits (Angelo Dawkins and Montez Ford) made the save. This led to an eight-man tag team match in which Rollins, Murphy, and AOP defeated The Viking Raiders and The Street Profits. Afterwards, Kevin Owens appeared and attacked AOP and Murphy before Rollins laid him out with three Stomps as the show ended. The following week, a match between Rollins and Owens was scheduled for WrestleMania 36.

=== SmackDown ===
Dolph Ziggler continued to taunt Otis over his relationship with Mandy Rose. On the March 20 episode of SmackDown, Ziggler cost Heavy Machinery (Otis and Tucker) another opportunity at the SmackDown Tag Team Championship. Ziggler then challenged Otis to a match at WrestleMania 36, and Otis accepted.

On the March 27 episode of SmackDown, The New Day (Big E and Kofi Kingston) faced The Usos (Jey Uso and Jimmy Uso) to determine the number one contenders to The Miz and John Morrison for the SmackDown Tag Team Championship at WrestleMania 36, only for the match to end in a no-contest when Miz and Morrison attacked both teams. Miz and Morrison were then scheduled to defend the titles against The New Day and The Usos at WrestleMania 36 in a triple threat ladder match, though because The Miz was injured, one member of each team competed in the match.

Daniel Bryan and Drew Gulak formed an alliance out of mutual respect for each other. New Intercontinental Champion Sami Zayn took offense, as Zayn had previously offered Bryan to join his faction, which Bryan initially declined. Bryan then challenged Zayn for the Intercontinental Championship at WrestleMania 36 and Zayn accepted if Gulak could defeat his teammate, Shinsuke Nakamura. Gulak defeated Nakamura on the March 27 episode of SmackDown to secure the title match for Bryan.

== Results ==
No.	Results	Stipulations	Times
1^{P}	The Viking Raiders (Erik and Ivar) defeated Curt Hawkins and Zack Ryder by pinfall	Tag team match	4:50
2	Daniel Bryan defeated Drew Gulak by technical submission	Singles match	14:20
3	Andrade (c) (with Zelina Vega) defeated Humberto Carrillo by pinfall	Singles match for the WWE United States Championship	12:20
4	The Miz and John Morrison (c) defeated The New Day (Big E and Kofi Kingston), The Usos (Jey Uso and Jimmy Uso), Heavy Machinery (Otis and Tucker), Lucha House Party (Gran Metalik and Lince Dorado), and Dolph Ziggler and Robert Roode	Elimination Chamber match for the WWE SmackDown Tag Team Championship	32:55
5	Aleister Black defeated AJ Styles (with Luke Gallows and Karl Anderson) by pinfall	No Disqualification match	23:15
6	The Street Profits (Angelo Dawkins and Montez Ford) (c) defeated Seth Rollins and Murphy (with Akam and Rezar) by pinfall	Tag team match for the WWE Raw Tag Team Championship	18:30
7	Sami Zayn, Shinsuke Nakamura, and Cesaro defeated Braun Strowman (c) by pinfall	3-on-1 Handicap match for the WWE Intercontinental Championship; Since Zayn pinned Strowman, he won the title.	8:30
8	Shayna Baszler defeated Natalya, Liv Morgan, Asuka, Ruby Riott, and Sarah Logan	Elimination Chamber match for a WWE Raw Women's Championship match at WrestleMania 36	21:00
(c) / – the champion(s) heading into the match; P / – the match was broadcast on the pre-show

=== SmackDown Tag Team Elimination Chamber match ===
Eliminated	Team	Entered	Eliminated by	Method	Times
1	Lucha House Party (Gran Metalik and Lince Dorado)	3	Heavy Machinery (Otis and Tucker)	The Compactor	17:16
2	Heavy Machinery (Otis and Tucker)	5	Dolph Ziggler and Robert Roode	Super kick/Glorious DDT	23:45
3	Dolph Ziggler and Robert Roode	6	The Usos (Jey Uso and Jimmy Uso)	Double Uso Splash	25:12
4	The New Day (Big E and Kofi Kingston)	2	The Miz and John Morrison	Kofi Kingston missed a splash from the top of the pod	29:05
5	The Usos (Jey Uso and Jimmy Uso)	1	The Miz and John Morrison	Sunset Flip Powerbomb	32:55
Winner	The Miz and John Morrison (c)	4			

=== Women's Elimination Chamber match ===
Eliminated	Wrestler	Entered	Eliminated by	Method	Times
1	Sarah Logan	3	Shayna Baszler	Technical submission	7:50
2	Ruby Riott	2	Shayna Baszler	Submission	8:15
3	Natalya	1	Shayna Baszler	Submission	9:30
4	Liv Morgan	5	Shayna Baszler	Technical submission	15:00
5	Asuka	6	Shayna Baszler	Technical submission	21:00
Winner	Shayna Baszler	4			21:00
