= Ruby Soho (wrestler) =

American professional wrestler (born 1991)

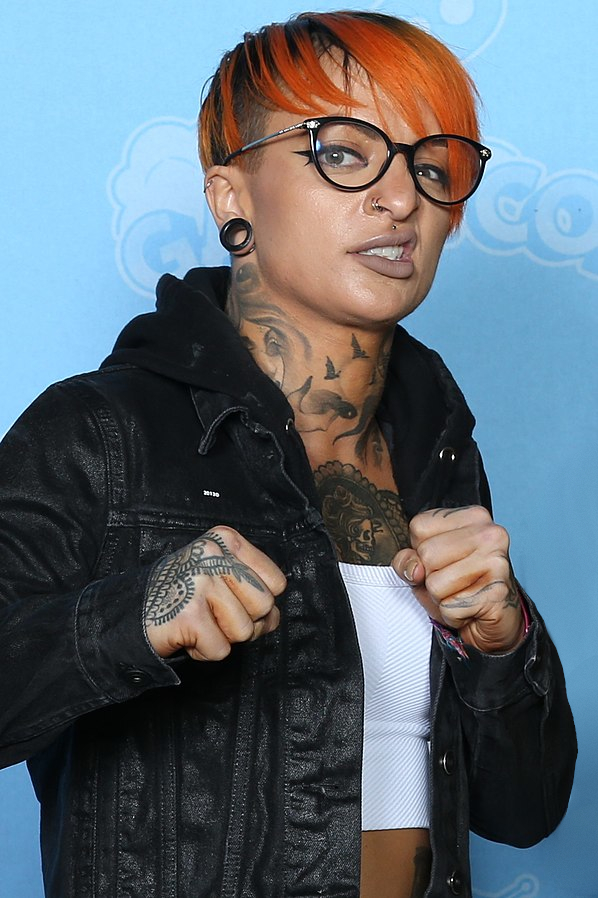
- Soho in 2022

Personal information
- Born: Dori Elizabeth Prange; January 9, 1991 (age 35) Edwardsburg, Michigan, U.S.
- Spouse: Angelo Parker (m. 2024)
- Children: 1

Professional wrestling career
- Ring name(s): Heidi Lovelace; Ruby Riot; Ruby Riott; Ruby Soho
- Billed height: 5 ft 4 in (163 cm)
- Billed weight: 122 lb (55 kg)
- Billed from: Lafayette, Indiana
- Trained by: Billy Roc; Ohio Valley Wrestling
- Debut: 2010
- Retired: 2025

Dori Elizabeth Prange (/preɪn/ PRAYN; born January 9, 1991) is an American professional wrestler. She is signed to All Elite Wrestling (AEW), where she performs under the ring name Ruby Soho. She is also known for her time in WWE, where she performed under the ring name Ruby Riott.

From 2010 to 2016, Prange worked under the ringname Heidi Lovelace as an independent wrestler for several American promotions, like Shimmer Women Athletes, Shine Wrestling, Ohio Valley Wrestling and IWA Mid-South. She also worked for the Japanese promotion World Wonder Ring Stardom. In 2016, she signed a contract with WWE, working as Ruby Riot. She worked for the development brand NXT until she was called up to the main roster the next year. There, she was part of the Riot Squad stable with Liv Morgan and Sarah Logan. Riott left WWE in 2021 and signed with AEW, where she changed her ringname to Ruby Soho.

== Professional wrestling career ==
=== Independent circuit (2010–2016) ===
In 2010, Prange began training with Billy Roc at his School of Roc. She made her debut for Juggalo Championship Wrestling, at the Arena Chicks at the Gathering! event under the ring name Heidi Lovelace, where she defeated C.J. Lane. Lovelace made her debut for Shimmer Women Athletes competing in Volume 51, where she teamed up with December in a losing effort to Pink Flash Kira and Sweet Cherrie in a tag-team match.

==== Ohio Valley Wrestling (2012–2013) ====
On May 16, 2012, Prange received a tryout in Ohio Valley Wrestling (OVW) against Taeler Hendrix, which she failed to win. Prange made her debut for the promotion under the ring name Heidi Lovelace on the May 23 episode of OVW episode 666, where she lost to C.J Lane. On September 1 at OVW's Saturday Night Special, Lovelace defeated Taeler Hendrix in a no disqualifications match, earning a future championship match against her. Lovelace defeated Hendrix for OVW Women's Championship on September 15 during a live event in Elizabethtown, Kentucky. After winning the Women's Championship, Lovelace had victories over Jessie Belle Smoothers, Epiphany, Josette Bynum and Scarlett Bordeaux. On the November 14 episode of OVW episode 691, Lovelace dropped the Women's Championship to Taryn Terrell after the special guest referee Taeler Hendrix cost her the match. Since January 2013, Hendrix received gifts from a secret admirer which she thought was either Dylan Bostic or Ryan Howe. The conclusion of that story ended on the April 27 episode of OVW when Heidi announced that it was her sending the gifts to Hendrix. On the May 4 episode of OVW, Lovelace tried to express her feelings to Hendrix but ended up alone with Hendrix confused. On the May 31 episode of OVW, Lovelace (after being told by Hendrix that Trina has something against the two of them) confronted Trina and challenged her to a match for the Women's Title on the Saturday Night Special, which Trina accepted. The following day at OVW's Saturday Night Special, Trina reversed Lovelace's attempt of a hurricanrana into a powerbomb to retain her title.

==== Shine Wrestling (2012–2014) ====
At Shine Wrestling's Shine 2 event, Prange as Heidi Lovelace faced fellow OVW wrestlers Sojournor Bolt and Taeler Hendrix in a three-way match, which was won by Bolt. On November 16, at Shine 5, Lovelace was defeated by Sassy Stephie in a singles match. On February 22, 2013, at Shine 7, Lovelace was defeated by Brittney Savage. On May 24, Lovelace teamed with Luscious Latasha and Solo Darling to take on Sojournor Bolt, Sassy Stephie and Jessie Belle in a six–women tag team match, in which her team lost. Lovelace's losing streak continued at Shine 15 when she was defeated by Mercedes Martinez in singles action. During Shine 16 on January 24, 2014, her losing streak ended after being confirmed as the newest member of the "All Star Squad" (ASS) faction run by Daffney, after forming a tag team with fellow ASS member Solo Darling called "The Buddy System" and defeated S-N-S Express (Sassy Stephie and Jessie Belle Smothers).

==== Chikara (2013–2016) ====
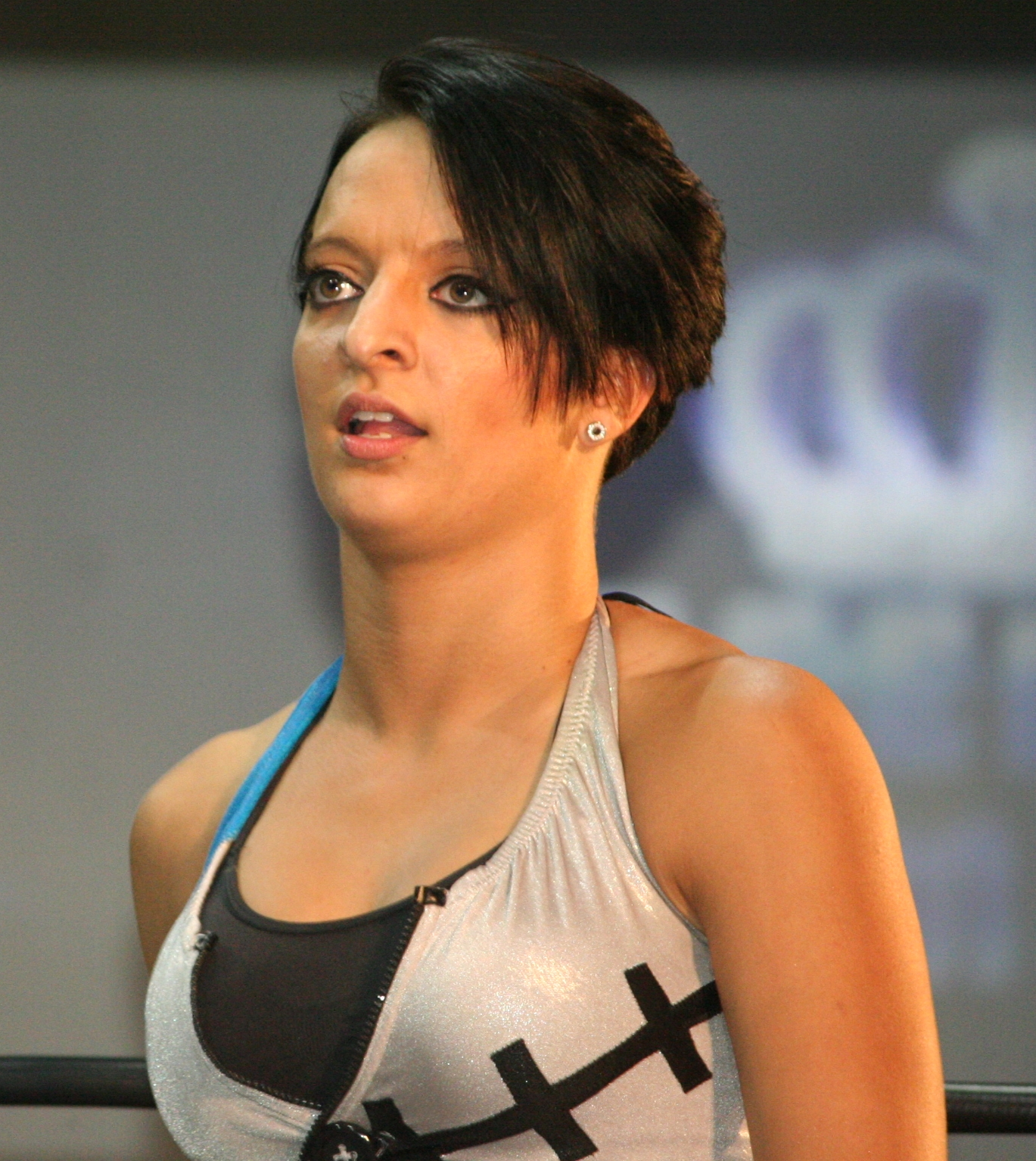
Lovelace at a live event in September 2014

On May 18, 2013, Lovelace made her debut for Chikara, when she and Saturyne entered the 2013 Tag World Grand Prix. They were, however, eliminated in their first round match by Arik Cannon and Darin Corbin. On December 6, 2014, in the pre-show of the Tomorrow Never Dies iPPV, Lovelace defeated Missile Assault Ant in the finals of a tournament to win the Chikara Young Lions Cup. She defended her Young Lions Cup multiple times in 2015, remaining undefeated in the year.

Also in 2015, Heidi took part in the "Challenge of the Immortals" tournament, which was a season-long double round-robin event. She was drafted to Dasher Hatfield's team, christened "Dasher's Dugout", which also included Dasher's fellow Throwbacks teammate "Mr. Touchdown" Mark Angelosetti, and then Chikara Grand Championship holder, Icarus. Their team led in points for much of the tournament, before ultimately forfeiting their points due to it being revealed that "Mr. Touchdown" had been cheating late in the tournament, by giving Dasher a secretly "loaded" elbow pad. Even so, Dasher and Heidi took part in the season-closing "Tourneo Cibernetico" 16-man match together.

On Saturday, March 19, 2016, she received a title shot at the Chikara Grand Championship against fellow female wrestler Princess Kimber Lee in Gibsonville, North Carolina at the Mid-Atlantic Sportatorium. Kimber retained after escaping the Chikara Special submission and then locking on a bow and arrow style submission that contorted Heidi to the point she had to tap (she had suffered neck damage due to the double-digit German suplexes she sustained over the course of the match).

==== World Wonder Ring Stardom (2015) ====
On January 11, 2015, Lovelace made her Japanese debut for the World Wonder Ring Stardom promotion, teaming with Act Yasukawa in a tag team match, where they defeated Hudson Envy and Kris Wolf. On January 18, Lovelace, Yasukawa and Dragonita were forced to join the villainous Monster-gun stable, after being defeated by Envy, Wolf and the stable's leader Kyoko Kimura in a six-woman tag team match. Following the addition of the new members, Monster-gun was renamed Oedo Tai. On February 8, Lovelace, Dragonita and Envy unsuccessfully challenged Heisei-gun (Io Shirai, Mayu Iwatani and Takumi Iroha) for the Artist of Stardom Championship.

==== Ring of Honor Wrestling (2015) ====
On the December 2, 2015, episode of Women of Honor Wednesday, as Heidi Lovelace she made her Ring of Honor debut in the Women of Honor division against Veda Scott but was not successful.

=== WWE (2016–2021) ===
==== NXT (2016–2017) ====
On December 15, 2016, it was reported that Prange had signed with WWE and reported to the WWE Performance Center. She made her in-ring debut on January 13 at an NXT live event, losing to Daria Berenato. Going by the ring name Ruby Riot, she made her television debut on the March 22 episode of NXT, attacking Nikki Cross and the rest of Sanity, alongside Tye Dillinger, No Way Jose and Roderick Strong, establishing herself as a face. This led to a match between the two teams at NXT TakeOver: Orlando, on April 1, where Riot's team lost.

In her first singles match, which aired on the April 12 episode of NXT, Riot defeated Kimberly Frankele with Nikki Cross attempting to distract her. The following week, Cross called out Riot and a brawl ensued. William Regal booked the two in a match, which again led to a brawl that had to be split up. On the May 3 episode of NXT, Riot participated in a #1 contender's battle royal for Asuka's NXT Women's Championship and made it to the final three before Asuka attacked her, Cross, and Ember Moon, resulting in a no contest. A fatal four-way match between all four women for the championship was later scheduled at NXT TakeOver: Chicago, but Moon was later taken out of the match due to a legitimate injury. Riot lost the match at the event after Asuka pinned both her and Cross simultaneously. On the October 18 episode of NXT, Riot competed against Ember Moon and Sonya Deville in a triple threat qualifying match for a title opportunity at NXT TakeOver: WarGames, but was unsuccessful as the match was won by Moon. She later competed twice against Sonya Deville, with Riot winning the first match on the November 22 episode of NXT, but losing the second one on December 7 in a No Holds Barred match, which turned out to be her last match on NXT after already being on the main roster.

==== The Riott Squad (2017–2019) ====
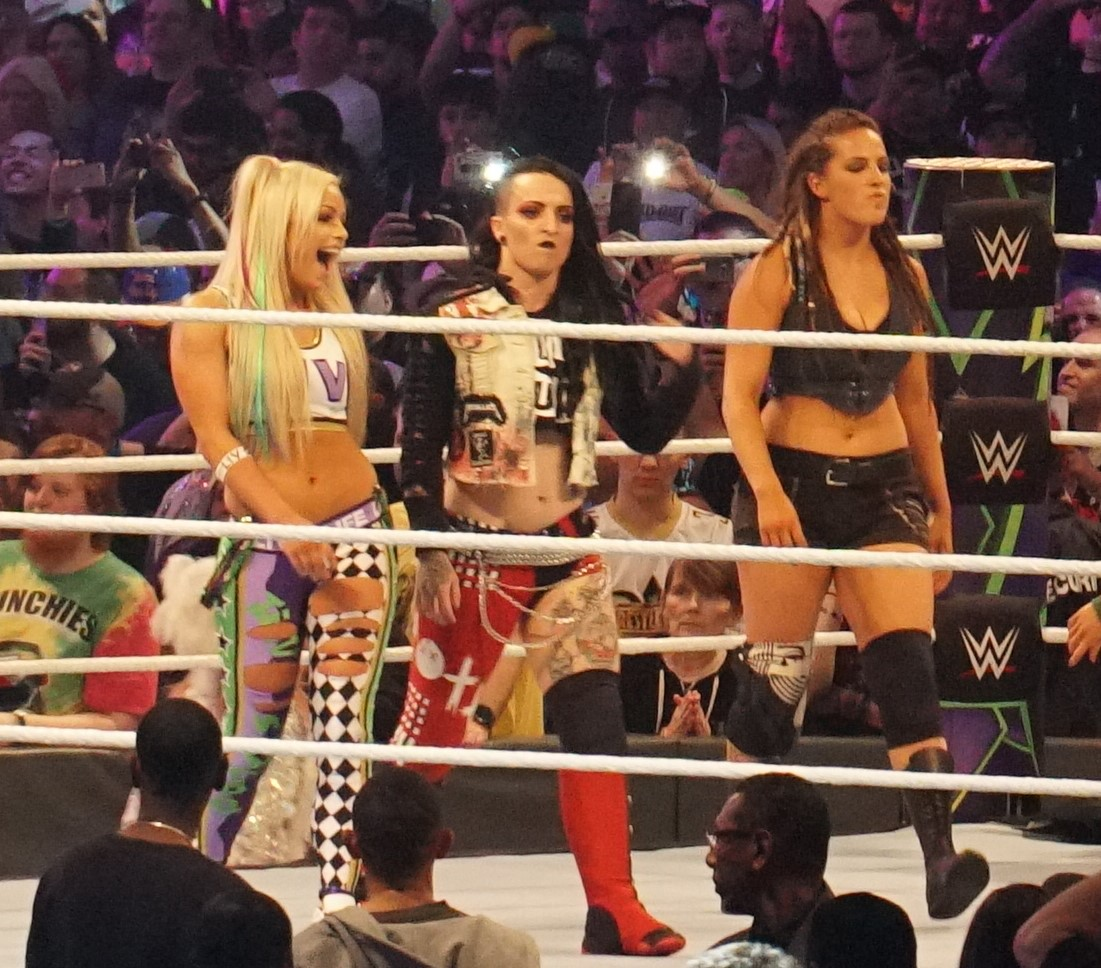
The Riott Squad at WrestleMania 34

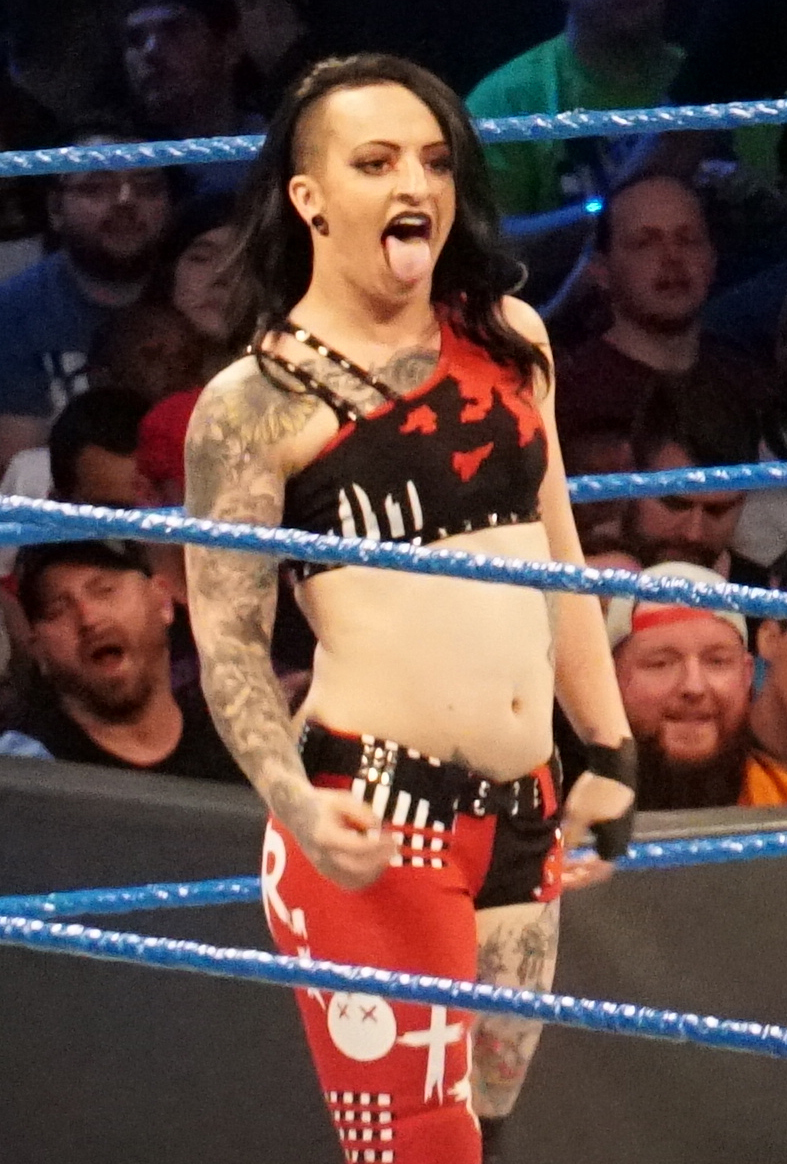
Ruby Riott in April 2018

On the November 21, 2017, episode of SmackDown Live, Riot, now known as Ruby Riott, made her main roster debut, alongside Liv Morgan and Sarah Logan, by attacking both Becky Lynch and Naomi, turning heel. Later that night, they interrupted a match between SmackDown Women's Champion Charlotte Flair and Natalya and attacked both. The following week, the trio, now dubbed The Riott Squad, made their in ring-debuts, defeating Flair, Natalya and Naomi in a six-woman tag team match. On January 28, 2018, at the Royal Rumble event, Riott competed in the inaugural women's Royal Rumble match where she lasted 11:00 and eliminated Becky Lynch and Vickie Guerrero before she was eliminated by Nia Jax. Riott challenged Flair for the SmackDown Women's Championship at Fastlane, but was unsuccessful. In April, Riott also competed in the first ever WrestleMania Women's Battle Royal on the WrestleMania 34 kickoff show, but she was unsuccessful in winning the match.

On April 16, The Riott Squad were drafted to Raw as part of the 2018 Superstar Shake-Up. Later that night, the group attacked both Bayley and Sasha Banks during their match. Two weeks later, Riott defeated Banks in her first match for on Raw. Six days later during the Backlash Kickoff, Riott defeated Bayley. The following night, Riott competed in a Money in the Bank qualifying match against Banks and Ember Moon; Moon pinned Riott for the victory. She competed in a Gauntlet Match on the May 28 episode of Raw, but was unsuccessful. On the August 6 episode of Raw, Riott (who had been sidelined with a knee injury) returned and assisted Morgan and Logan in defeating Bayley and Banks in a tag team match.

In September, The Riott Squad began a feud with The Bella Twins, who aligned themselves with Ronda Rousey. This prompted a six–woman tag team match to take place at Super Show-Down, where The Riott Squad were defeated. The Riott Squad took part of the first-ever all women's pay–per–view, Evolution, where they were defeated by Bayley, Banks and Natalya. On the November 12 episode of Raw, Riott was named as the final member for Team Raw in the five–on–five elimination match at Survivor Series. During the event's Kickoff, Riott and Natalya fought in the locker room. This led to team captain Alexa Bliss removing them from the team and replacing them with Banks and Bayley.

At TLC (2018) Ruby lost a Tables Match to Natalya, ending their feud. On January 27, 2019, at the Royal Rumble, Riott competed in the second women's Royal Rumble match, entering at number 21, lasting 13:08 and eliminating four competitors before she was eliminated by Bayley. The following month, on February 17, Riott challenged Ronda Rousey for the Raw Women's Championship at the Elimination Chamber pay-per-view, but was destroyed in under two minutes. The following night on Raw, Riott faced Rousey again in a rematch for the title, however, she was once again defeated by submission. On April 7, during the WrestleMania 35 kick–off show, Riott again competed in the WrestleMania Women's Battle Royal but the match was won by Carmella. During the 2019 WWE Superstar Shake-up, Morgan was moved to SmackDown Live, effectively ending the group. Following the disbandment, Riott underwent shoulder surgery to repair a bilateral injury in May. She underwent the same procedure on her other shoulder in August.

==== Feud and reunion with Liv Morgan (2020–2021) ====
Riott returned from injury on the February 3, 2020 episode of Raw, attacking her former Riott Squad teammate, Liv Morgan which resulted in a match between the two with Sarah Logan as the special guest referee where Liv was victorious after a fast count by Logan. At Elimination Chamber on March 8, Riott competed in the Elimination Chamber match, during which she was eliminated by eventual winner Shayna Baszler. After WrestleMania 36, Riott continued her feud with Morgan where she lost to her twice on the April 20 and 27 episodes of Raw, respectively. On the June 22 episode of Raw, Riott attempted to console Morgan after her loss but Morgan immediately rejected her. Over the next couple of weeks, Riott started defending Morgan from bullying from The IIconics, initiating a feud with them. On the July 13 episode of Raw, Riott formed an alliance with Bianca Belair. The two defeated The IIconics in a tag match the same night.

On the August 3 episode of Raw, Ruby appeared on the Kevin Owens Show and apologized to the returning Liv Morgan, only to be interrupted by The IIconics. Later the same night, Liv decided to team up with Riott to take on The IIconics in a winning effort. This marked the beginning of reformation of Morgan and Riott as The Riott Squad. They faced The IIconics two more times at Payback and on the August 31 episode of Raw for the #1 contendership for the WWE Women's Tag Team Championship, also forcing The IIconics to break up per stipulation. As part of the 2020 Draft in October, both Riott and Morgan were drafted to the SmackDown brand. On April 10, 2021, on Night 1 of WrestleMania 37, Riott and Morgan competed in a tag team turmoil match for the #1 contendership for the Women's Tag Team Championships, with the winners going on to compete the following night, the duo went on to eliminate the teams of Billie Kay and Carmella, and Mandy Rose and Dana Brooke, before being defeated by the victorious Natalya and Tamina. On June 2, 2021, Riott was released by WWE, effectively disbanding The Riott Squad for the second time.

=== All Elite Wrestling (2021–present) ===
On September 5, Prange, now going by Ruby Soho, made her All Elite Wrestling (AEW) debut as the surprise Joker entrant in the women's Casino Battle Royale match at the promotion's All Out pay-per-view in Chicago, and won her debut match after eliminating Thunder Rosa, thus earning herself a future match for the AEW Women's World Championship which was being held by Britt Baker On September 22, at Grand Slam, Soho lost to Baker in a title match at the main event, after interference by Baker's allies Jamie Hayter and Rebel. Then, she participated in two tournaments: first the AEW TBS championship tournament where she was defeated in the finals by Jade Cargill and second, the AEW Owen Hart Cup, where she was also defeated in the finals by Baker. At All Out Zero Hour, Soho and Ortiz challenged Sammy Guevara and Tay Melo for the AAA World Mixed Tag Team Championships in a losing effort, and Soho sustained a legit broken nose after being dropped on the top of her head mid-match,.

At the Revolution event on March 5, 2023, after Jamie Hayter defeated Soho and Saraya to retain the AEW Women's Championship, Soho beat down Hayter and Britt Baker and aligned herself with Saraya and Toni Storm, thus turning heel for the first time since her 2021 WWE departure and the first in her AEW career overall. On 10 March, the group became officially known as "The Outcasts". On the July 5 episode of Dynamite, Soho competed in the Owen Hart Foundation Women's Tournament, defeating Britt Baker in the quarterfinals of the tournament before losing to Willow Nightingale in the finals. Following this, Soho began an onscreen romance with Angelo Parker, much to the chagrin of Saraya. After weeks of flirting, Saraya used Harley Cameron to drive a wedge between the two. In April 2024, Soho took time away from AEW owing to her legitimate pregnancy.

== Professional wrestling persona ==
On June 18, 2021, during an interview on Wrestling Perspective Podcast, Prange discussed how she would like to keep the Ruby name for her character and would not be returning to her Heidi Lovelace ring name as she disliked that name, and it was never her idea to begin with. She said she originally took the Ruby name from the Rancid song "Ruby Soho", however, WWE owns the rights to the Ruby Riott ring name so she could no longer use it. It was then suggested by Rancid's Lars Fredriksen, who is one of the hosts of the podcast, that she should use the ring name Ruby Soho and assured her that he could also have the song cleared legally for her to use as her entrance theme. The name change was confirmed via a post on Prange's Instagram account.

== Other media ==
Riott made her video game debut in WWE 2K18 as a downloadable character, and appeared in the succeeding titles WWE 2K19 and WWE 2K20. She appears as a downloadable character in the title WWE 2K Battlegrounds. Ruby Soho appears in AEW Fight Forever.

== Personal life ==
On May 18, 2024, Prange married Angelo Parker. The couple have a child together. In October 2025, Prange and Parker opened a board gaming and professional wrestling-themed board game café called Victory Roll in Mishawaka, Indiana.

== Championships and accomplishments ==
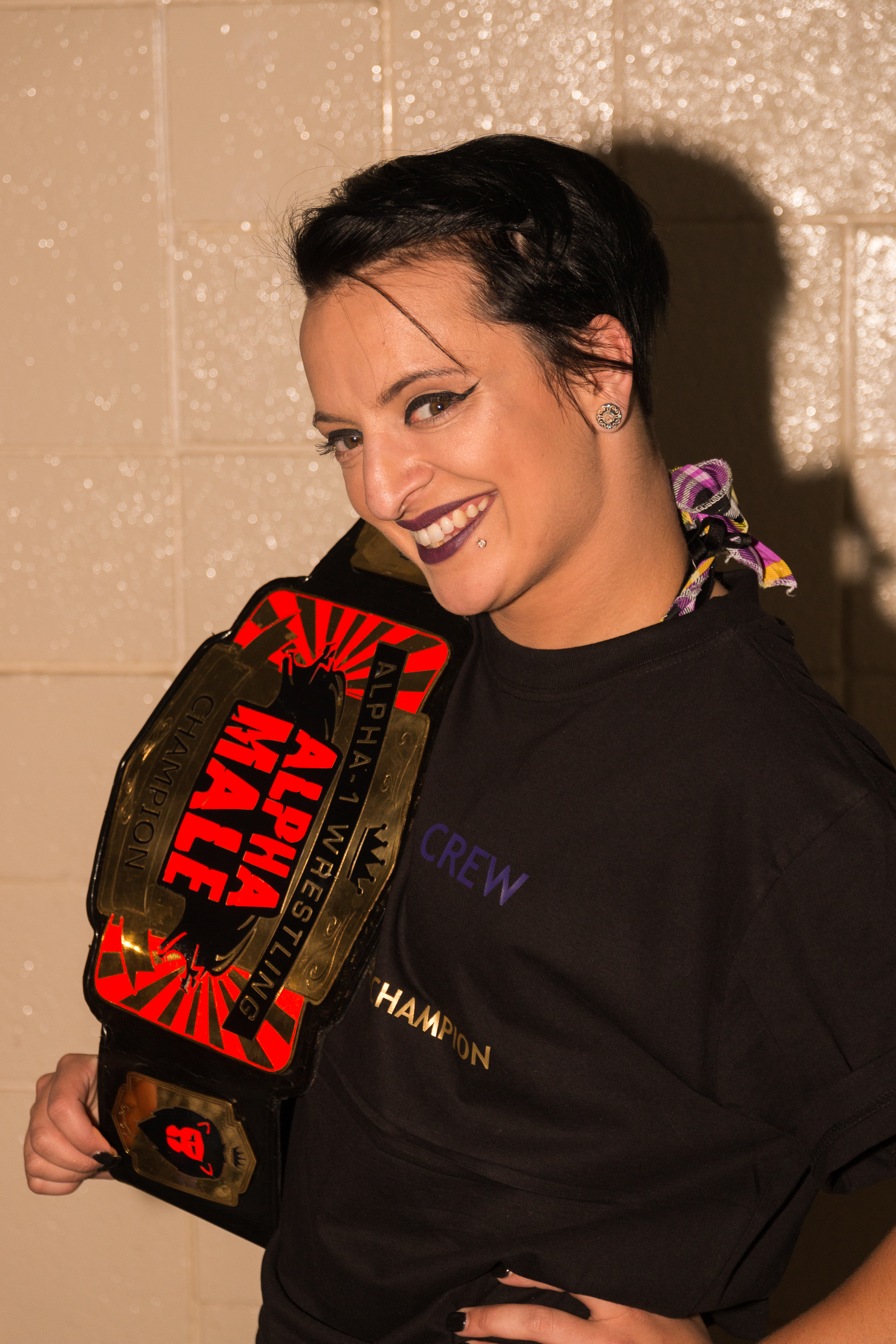
Lovelace as A1 Alpha Male Champion

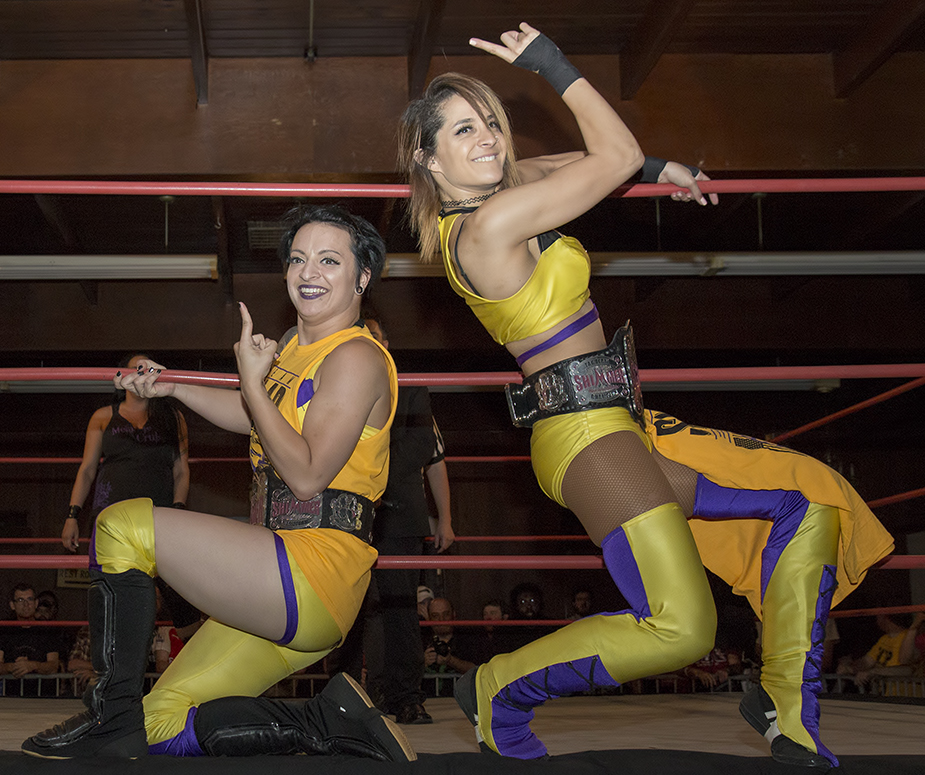
Alongside Evie (later known as Dakota Kai), Lovelace was one half of the Shimmer Tag Team Champions in 2016. Together the duo was known as "Team Slap Happy".

- Absolute Intense Wrestling
  - AIW Women's Championship (1 time)
- All American Wrestling
  - AAW Heritage Championship (1 time)
- All Elite Wrestling
  - Women's Casino Battle Royale (2021)
- Alpha-1 Wrestling
  - A1 Alpha Male Championship (1 time)
- Channel Islands World Wrestling
  - World Heavyweight Championship (1 time)
- Chikara
  - Young Lions Cup XI (1 time)
- Ohio Valley Wrestling
  - OVW Women's Championship (1 time)
- Pro Wrestling Illustrated
  - Ranked No. 20 of the top 50 female wrestlers in the PWI Female 50 in 2016
  - Ranked No. 48 of the top 50 Tag Teams in the PWI Tag Team 50 in 2021 - with Liv Morgan
- Sports Illustrated
  - Ranked No. 12 in the top 30 female wrestlers in 2018
- Revolution Championship Wrestling
  - RCW Heavyweight Championship (1 time)
- Shimmer Women Athletes
  - Shimmer Tag Team Championship (1 time) – with Evie
- Women's Wrestling Hall of Fame
  - WWHOF Award (1 time)
    - Most Improved Wrestler of the Year (2024)

Preceded by Nyla Rose	Women's Casino Battle Royale winner 2021	Succeeded by Incumbent
