= Dolph Ziggler and Robert Roode =

Professional wrestling tag team

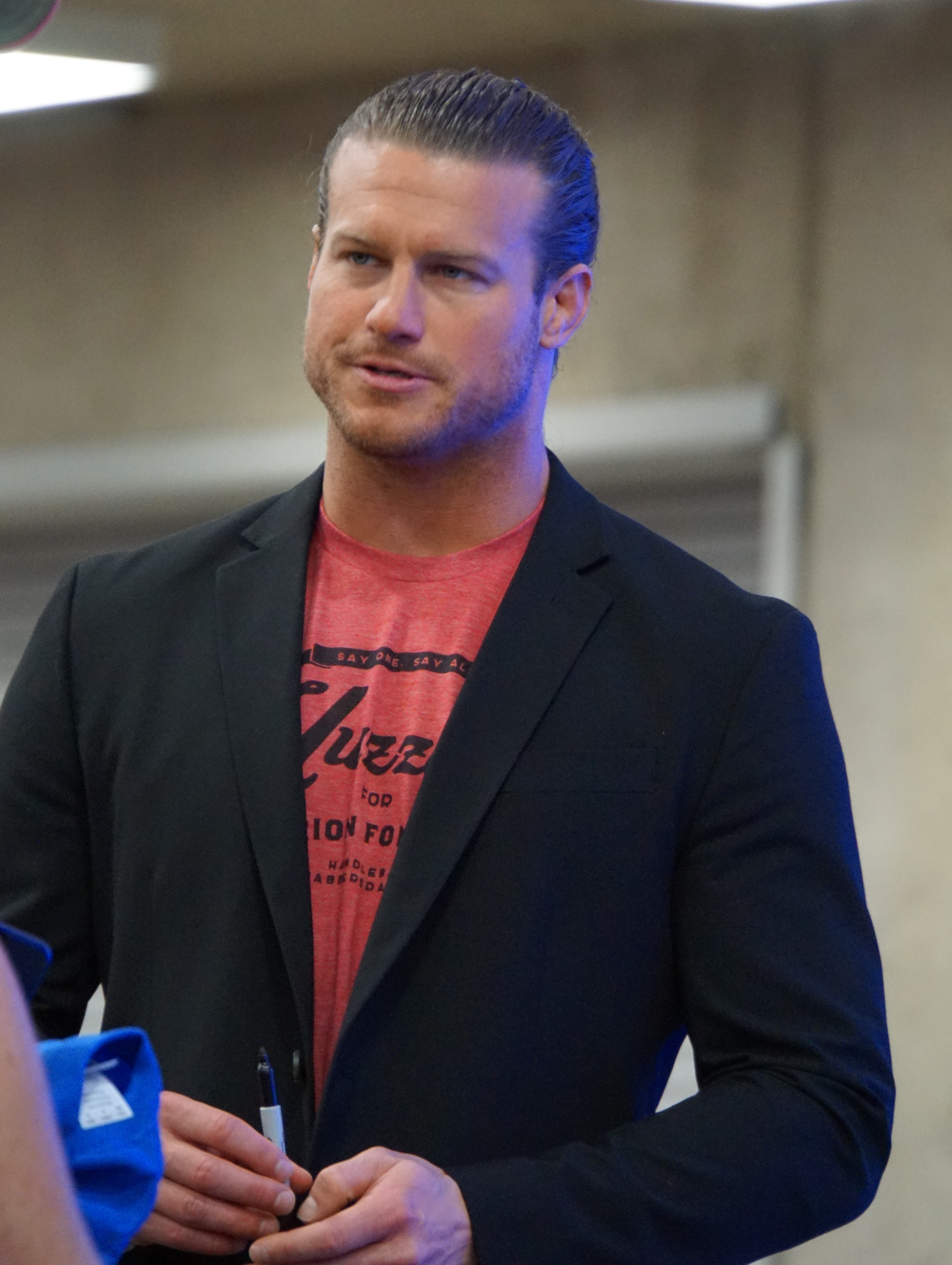
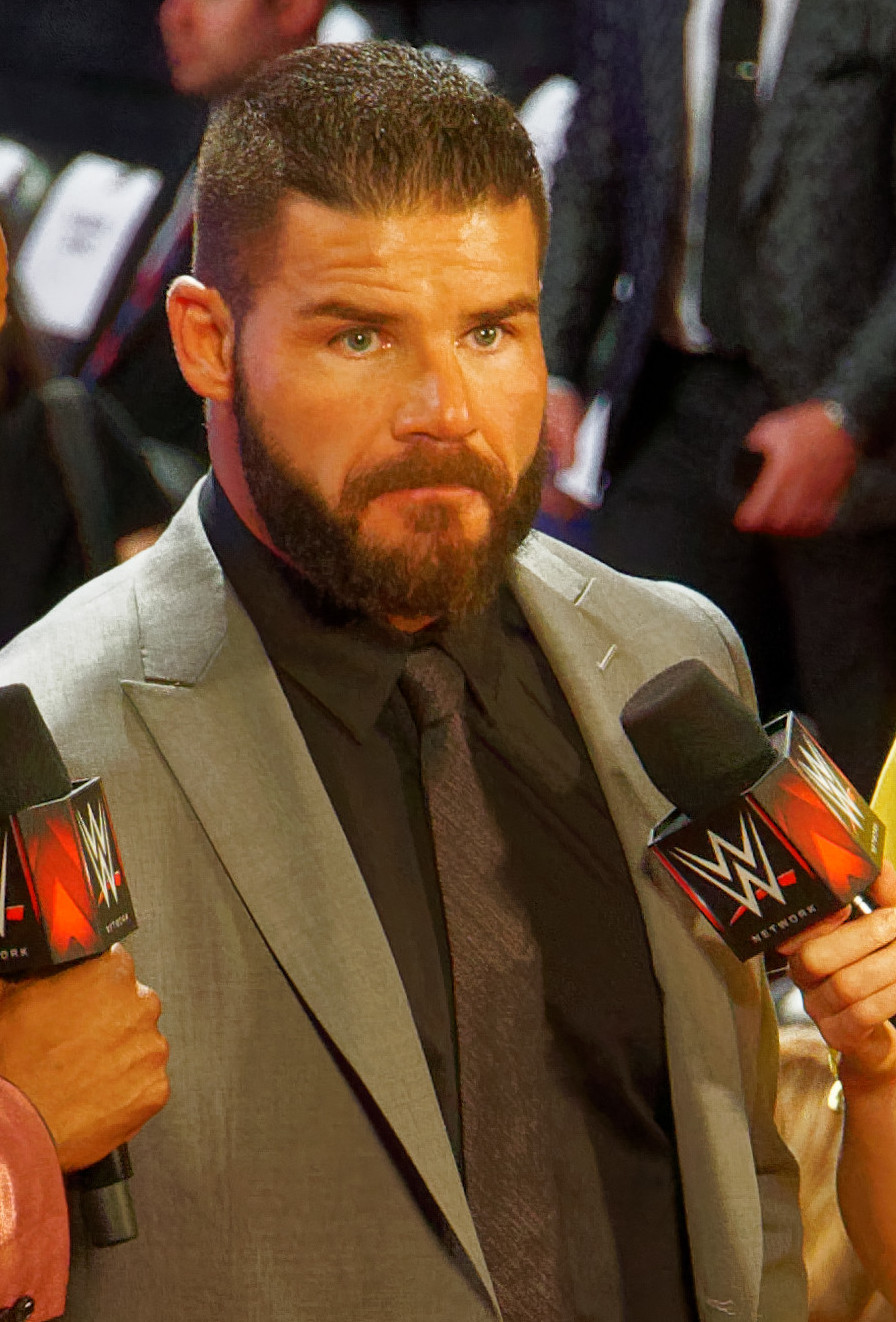
- Ziggler (left, in 2016) and Roode (right, in 2018)

Tag team
- Members: Dolph Ziggler; Robert Roode
- Name(s): Dolph Ziggler and Robert Roode; The Dirty Dawgs; The Dirty Dogs
- Billed heights: Ziggler: 6 ft 0 in (1.83 m); Roode: 6 ft 1 in (1.85 m)
- Combined billed weight: 455 lb (206 kg)
- Debut: August 26, 2019
- Disbanded: June 25, 2022
- Years active: 2019–2022

Dolph Ziggler and Robert Roode, sometimes referred to as The Dirty Dawgs or The Dirty Dogs, were a professional wrestling tag team in WWE, where they are former one-time Raw Tag Team Champions and one-time SmackDown Tag Team Champions.

After a feud between them in 2017, Roode and Ziggler began to work as a tag team in 2019, winning the Raw Tag Team Championship, retaining it for 29 days. The duo also won the SmackDown Tag Team Championship, retaining it for 128 days. During their time as a tag team, Ziggler also won the NXT Championship. The team disbanded in June 2022 after Roode suffered an injury.

== History ==
After being paired together on the August 26, 2019 episode of Raw, Dolph Ziggler and Robert Roode won a tag team turmoil match to earn a Raw Tag Team Championship shot at Clash of Champions. At the event on September 15, they won the titles from Seth Rollins and Braun Strowman. On the October 14 episode of Raw, Ziggler and Roode lost the titles to The Viking Raiders (Erik and Ivar), ending their reign at 29 days, and they were drafted to the SmackDown brand as part of the 2019 WWE Draft.

At the Survivor Series pre-show on November 24, Ziggler and Roode won a ten team battle royal. In the following weeks, they aligned themselves with King Corbin during his feud against Roman Reigns. At Elimination Chamber on March 8, 2020, Ziggler and Roode competed in the namesake match for the SmackDown Tag Team Championship, but were unsuccessful. On the June 22 episode of Raw, it was announced that Ziggler and Roode were traded to the Raw brand for AJ Styles.

As part of the 2020 Draft in October, both Ziggler and Roode were drafted back to the SmackDown brand. On the January 8, 2021 episode of SmackDown, they defeated The Street Profits (Angelo Dawkins and Montez Ford) to win the SmackDown Tag Team Championship. They lost the titles to Rey and Dominik Mysterio at WrestleMania Backlash, ending their reign at 128 days. As part of the 2021 Draft, The Dirty Dawgs were drafted to the Raw brand.

On the February 22, 2022 episode of NXT 2.0, during a match between Dolph Ziggler and Tommaso Ciampa, Roode interfered in the match disguised as a cameraman to help Ziggler get the win. On March 8 at NXT Roadblock, Ziggler, with the help of Roode, defeated champion Bron Breakker and Tommaso Ciampa to win the NXT Championship. After a lengthy absence since Ziggler lost the NXT Championship, Ziggler and Roode returned on the June 6 episode of Raw in an on-stage interview segment.

Roode underwent a procedure and went out of action. In September 2023, Ziggler was released from his WWE contract. Roode retired from in-ring competition and went on to become a producer for WWE, ending any chance of a possible reunion.

== Championships and accomplishments ==
- WWE
  - WWE Raw Tag Team Championship (1 time)
  - WWE SmackDown Tag Team Championship (1 time)
  - NXT Championship (1 time) – Ziggler
