= NXT TakeOver 31 =

2020 WWE pay-per-view and livestreaming event

- Promotional poster featuring Finn Bálor, Kyle O'Reilly, Io Shirai, and Candice LeRae
- Promotion: WWE
- Brand: NXT
- Date: October 4, 2020
- City: Orlando, Florida
- Venue: Capitol Wrestling Center at WWE Performance Center
- Attendance: 0 (behind closed doors) (Note: The event was held without a paying audience due to the COVID-19 pandemic in the United States, though it featured a live crowd of WWE wrestlers, trainees, and select invited fans as well as virtual fans via NXT's Capitol Wrestling Center viewing experience.)

WWE event chronology
← Previous; Clash of Champions	Next → Hell in a Cell

NXT TakeOver chronology
← Previous; XXX	Next → WarGames

NXT TakeOver 31 was a 2020 professional wrestling pay-per-view (PPV) and livestreaming event produced by WWE, held for wrestlers from the promotion's NXT brand division. It was the 31st NXT TakeOver event and took place on October 4, 2020, from the Capitol Wrestling Center, a bio-secure bubble that was hosted at the WWE Performance Center in Orlando, Florida. Unlike all previous TakeOver events, which were livestreamed exclusively on the WWE Network, TakeOver 31 was the first TakeOver to air on traditional PPV in addition to the WWE Network.

This was the first NXT event to be produced from the Capitol Wrestling Center, which was similar to the WWE ThunderDome utilized for Raw and SmackDown with its name being an homage to the Capitol Wrestling Corporation, the predecessor to WWE. Due to the COVID-19 pandemic that began in mid-March, NXT's events were held at its previous home venue, Full Sail University in Winter Park, Florida, while Raw and SmackDown's events were held at the Performance Center. After Raw and SmackDown moved out of the Performance Center in August, the venue subsequently became NXT's permanent home beginning with this TakeOver.

There were five matches scheduled on the event's card, as well as two dark matches that occurred before the live broadcast. In the main event, Finn Bálor defeated Kyle O'Reilly to retain the NXT Championship. In the penultimate match, Io Shirai defeated Candice LeRae to retain the NXT Women's Championship. Other prominent matches included Santos Escobar defeating Isaiah "Swerve" Scott to retain the NXT Cruiserweight Championship, and in the opening bout, Damian Priest defeated Johnny Gargano to retain the NXT North American Championship.

== Production ==
=== Background ===
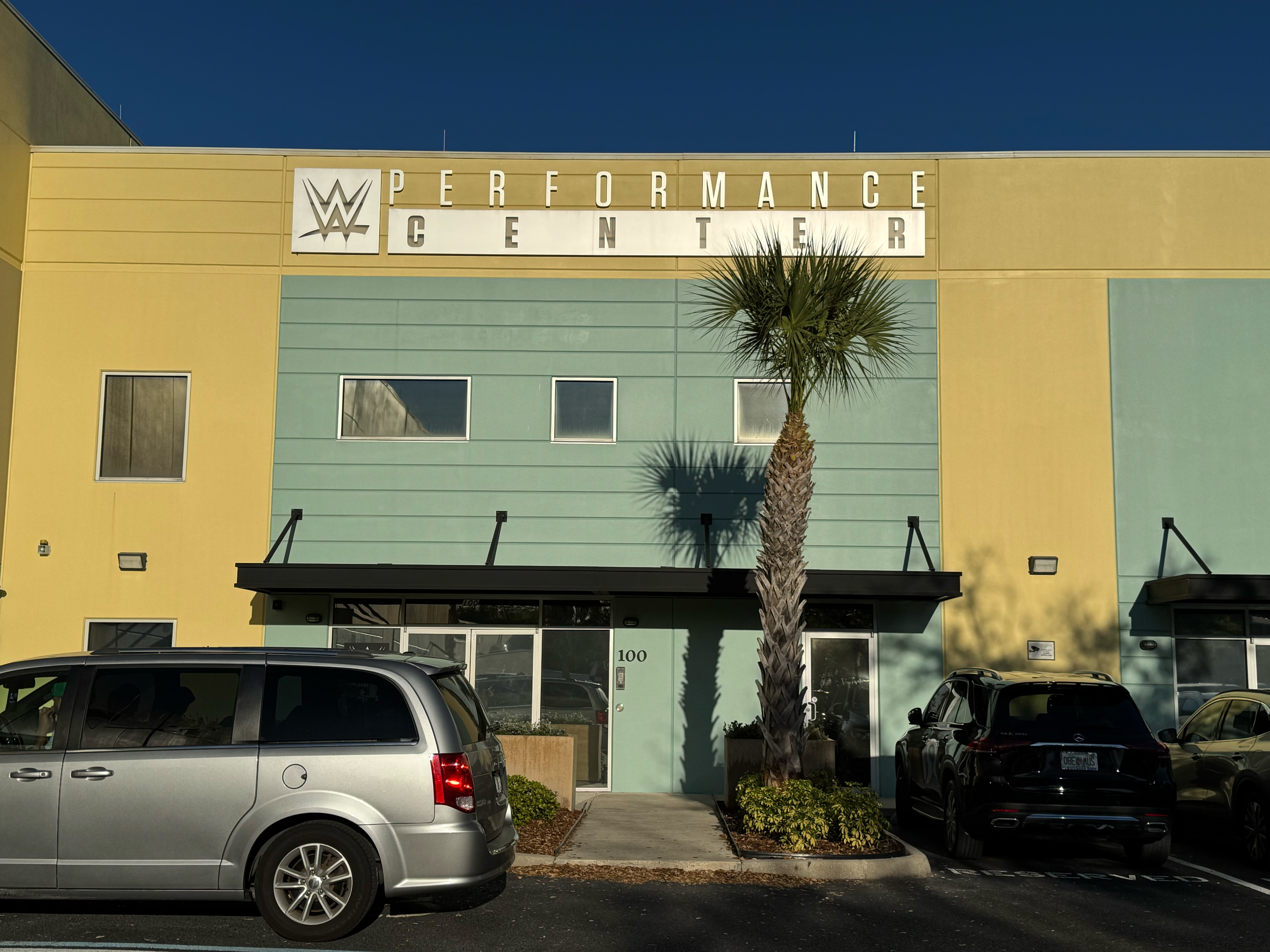
Due to the COVID-19 pandemic, the 31st NXT TakeOver event was produced by way of a bio-secure bubble called the Capitol Wrestling Center, which was hosted at the WWE Performance Center in Orlando, Florida. It was the first TakeOver produced from the Capitol Wrestling Center, as well as NXT's first event held at the Performance Center, which became its home venue.

TakeOver was a series of professional wrestling events that began in May 2014, as WWE's NXT brand held its second WWE Network-exclusive livestreaming event, billed as TakeOver. The "TakeOver" moniker subsequently became the branding for all of NXT's major events held periodically throughout the year. Announced on August 11, 2020, the 31st TakeOver event, which was simply titled TakeOver 31, was scheduled to be held on October 4, 2020. While TakeOver events were originally exclusive to the WWE Network, the day before TakeOver 31, it was announced that the event would also be available on traditional pay-per-view (PPV), marking the first TakeOver available on PPV in addition to the WWE Network.

==== Impact of the COVID-19 pandemic ====
As a result of the COVID-19 pandemic that began affecting the industry in mid-March, WWE had to present the majority of its programming from a behind closed doors set. NXT's programming was subsequently held at its home venue at the time, Full Sail University in Winter Park, Florida. On the day of the event on October 4, 2020, it was announced that beginning with TakeOver 31, NXT would be moving its events to the WWE Performance Center in Orlando, Florida, which would be produced by way of a bio-secure bubble called the Capitol Wrestling Center, its name being an homage to the Capitol Wrestling Corporation, the predecessor to WWE. Like the WWE ThunderDome utilized for Raw and SmackDown's programming, LED boards were placed around the Performance Center so that fans could attend virtually, while additionally and unlike the ThunderDome, friends and family members of the wrestlers were in attendance, along with a limited number of actual live fans, divided from each other by plexiglass walls.

=== Storylines ===
The card included matches that resulted from scripted storylines. Results were predetermined by WWE's writers on the NXT brand, while storylines were produced on WWE's weekly television program, NXT.

On the September 23 episode of NXT, Kyle O'Reilly won a gauntlet eliminator match, defeating Bronson Reed, Cameron Grimes, Kushida, and Timothy Thatcher to face NXT Champion Finn Bálor for the title at TakeOver 31.

On the September 23 episode of NXT, Candice LeRae won a battle royal to become the number one contender for the NXT Women's Championship against Io Shirai at TakeOver 31.

On September 23, NXT general manager William Regal announced that Damian Priest would defend the NXT North American Championship against Johnny Gargano at TakeOver 31.

On the August 12 episode of NXT, Kushida and the returning Velveteen Dream competed in a triple threat match to determine who would qualify for the ladder match at TakeOver XXX. After the match, Dream attacked Kushida. On Night 2 of NXT: Super Tuesday on September 8, Kushida returned and attacked Dream. On September 26, a match between the two was scheduled for TakeOver 31.

On the April 29 episode of NXT, Isaiah "Swerve" Scott defeated El Hijo del Fantasma in a tournament match for the vacant NXT Cruiserweight Championship, a tournament that Fantasma ultimately won and was later known as Santos Escobar. On the August 12 episode of NXT, after Escobar defeated Tyler Breeze, Escobar and his Legado del Fantasma stablemates, Joaquin Wilde and Raul Mendoza, attacked Breeze until Scott cleared them from the ring. The following week, Scott teamed with Breezango (Breeze and Fandango) against Legado del Fantasma. As Scott had Escobar pinned, he inadvertently tagged in Breeze, who was subsequently pinned. On the August 26 episode, Escobar retained the Cruiserweight Championship against Scott after using a luchador mask to hit him with a headbutt. On Night 1 of NXT: Super Tuesday on September 1, Scott and Breezango defeated Legado del Fantasma in a street fight with Scott pinning Escobar. On the September 23 episode of NXT, Scott announced his intentions to go after the title, and on September 29, the match was made official for TakeOver 31.

== Event ==
Other on-screen personnel
Role:	Name:
Commentators	Vic Joseph
Commentators	Wade Barrett
Commentators	Beth Phoenix
Spanish commentator	Marcelo Rodriguez
Ring announcer	Alicia Taylor
Referees	Drake Wuertz
Referees	Darryl Sharma
Referees	D.A. Brewer
Referees	Tom Castor
Interviewer	McKenzie Mitchell
Pre-show panel	Scott Stanford
Pre-show panel	Sam Roberts

=== Preliminary matches ===
The pay-per-view opened with Johnny Gargano challenging Damian Priest for Priest's NXT North American Championship. A spot in the match saw Damian Priest use a suicide dive but Johnny Gargano moved out of the way and Priest landed on a cameraman. At the conclusion of a competitive match, Priest managed to reverse Gargano's attempt at his slingshot DDT finisher (known as "One Final Beat") into his own rolling cutter finisher (known as "The Reckoning") which secured him the victory.

Next, Kushida faced the Velveteen Dream. Kushida was the aggressor for the majority of the match, with Dream only getting brief flurries of offense in. At the match's climax, Kushida locked in his "Hoverboard Lock" submission finisher and Dream tried to escape from it. He managed to hoist Kushida on his shoulders to deliver his own "Dream Valley Driver" maneuver, but still, Kushida did not release the hold, and Dream eventually submitted. Kushida continued to attack Dream after the bell, having to be pulled away by officials.

Isaiah "Swerve" Scott then challenged Santos Escobar for his NXT Cruiserweight Championship. This marked the first occasion that the cruiserweight championship was defended during the main card of a TakeOver event. The match was competitive, and both men kicked out of their opponent's finisher (the first instance in which Escobar's "Phantom Driver" did not secure him a victory). At the match's conclusion, Escobar's Legado del Fantasma stablemates Joaquin Wilde and Raul Mendoza ran in to distract Scott, but were chased off by Ashante "Thee" Adonis, entering to help Swerve. In the confusion, Escobar hit Swerve with a lifting, kneeling double-underhook facebreaker (which later came to be known as "Legado") and earned the pinfall.

The penultimate match of the night was for the NXT Women's Championship, Io Shirai defending against Candice LeRae. The two traded high-impact and high-flying maneuvers for many minutes, until LeRae locked in her husband's signature "Garga-No Escape" submission hold. When Shirai reached the ropes to force the break, LeRae inadvertently elbowed the official. Gargano then ran in with a referee's shirt on to try to fast-count the win for his wife, unsuccessfully. He then grabbed the championship belt and gave it to LeRae to use as a weapon, which she did, but Shirai still survived. Following a top-rope Spanish Fly and her signature finishing moonsault, Shirai won the match to retain the championship. Afterward, the mystery biker who had been advertised to make their appearance at TakeOver 31 came out to confront Shirai and was revealed to be Ember Moon. Toni Storm also confronted Shirai via satellite and confirmed that she has returned to NXT.

=== Main event ===
Kyle O'Reilly challenged Finn Bálor for the NXT Championship. The match was physically intense, with the two men trading stiff shots at one another for the bulk of it. Late on a kick by Bálor to the face of O'Reilly knocked him off his feet and he sustained legitimate injury. A knee to the gut of Bálor injured him and he started bleeding from the mouth. O'Reilly also sustained a notable shot to his liver, which was referenced in-storyline in the following days. The end featured Bálor using his "Coup de Grâce" finisher (a top rope diving double foot-stomp) on O'Reilly to retain. He offered a handshake to O'Reilly as a sign of respect after the brutal match.

After the match, as the show was about to go off the air, Ridge Holland suddenly appeared behind the barricade. He held over one shoulder a badly-beaten Adam Cole (O'Reilly's Undisputed Era stablemate). Holland said nothing, dropped Cole at ringside, and left. The show closed with O'Reilly, Roderick Strong, and Bobby Fish checking on Cole.

Both Bálor and O'Reilly sustained legitimate injuries in the match with Bálor suffering a hairline jaw fracture while O'Reilly had broken teeth and other unspecified injuries. Both missed the subsequent episode of NXT as a result.

== Reception ==
NXT TakeOver 31 received positive reviews from fans and insiders, with the NXT Championship Match garnering the most praise.

Kevin Pantoja of 411Mania gave the show a score of 9 out of 10 stating: "The COVID era TakeOvers have been good but not great. Well, this one gets back to classic TakeOver levels. The worst thing was a good KUSHIDA/Dream match. Then, you get a heck of an opener and two **** title matches before an all-time banger of a main event. To top it off, the show runs under two and a half hours, which is great."

Adam Silverstein of CBS Sports called TakeOver 31 one of the best shows of the year. He gave the NXT North American Championship match a grade of A−, Kushida vs. Velveteen Dream a grade of B, the Cruiserweight Championship match a grade of A−, the Women's Championship match a grade of B+ and the NXT Championship match a grade of A.

Dave Meltzer of the Wrestling Observer Newsletter gave 3.75 stars to the NXT North American, Cruiserweight and Women's Championship matches while giving 3.25 stars to Kushida vs. Velveteen Dream and 4.5 stars to the NXT Championship match.

== Aftermath ==
Ridge Holland was seriously injured on the October 7 episode of NXT, putting him out of action for an extended period.

As announced during TakeOver, NXT was set to revive Halloween Havoc as a special episode of NXT on October 28, hosted by Shotzi Blackheart. On the October 14 episode of the program, Candice LeRae defeated Blackheart to earn another opportunity to challenge Io Shirai for the NXT Women's Championship. Johnny Gargano was also given a return bout with Damian Priest for the NXT North American Championship, and both title matches were announced to be "Spin the Wheel, Make the Deal" matches (a reference to the 1992 Halloween Havoc and just such a match between Jake "The Snake" Roberts and Sting).

Kyle O'Reilly returned to NXT on the October 14 episode, cutting a promo before stablemates Roderick Strong and Bobby Fish won a match to become number one contenders to the NXT Tag Team Championship, saying he would be medically cleared to wrestle again the following week and that if Ridge Holland were not already laid up in hospital, The Undisputed Era would have put him there.

Finn Bálor's injuries were more severe than first thought, and he underwent surgery on October 9 to repair his jaw fracture, with expected recovery time of six weeks. He returned to NXT on November 18 to announce his return, being interrupted by Pat McAfee and his "Kings of NXT" faction (of which Holland was meant to be a member prior to his injury), who then brawled with the also-returning Undisputed Era in advance of a WarGames match between the two sides at the next TakeOver event.

== Results ==
No.	Results	Stipulations	Times
1^{D}	Xia Li defeated Emily Andzulis	Singles match	—
2^{D}	Danny Burch defeated Daniel Vidot	Singles match	—
3	Damian Priest (c) defeated Johnny Gargano by pinfall	Singles match for the NXT North American Championship	18:39
4	Kushida defeated Velveteen Dream by submission	Singles match	13:00
5	Santos Escobar (c) (with Joaquin Wilde and Raul Mendoza) defeated Isaiah "Swerve" Scott by pinfall	Singles match for the NXT Cruiserweight Championship	15:14
6	Io Shirai (c) defeated Candice LeRae by pinfall	Singles match for the NXT Women's Championship	16:45
7	Finn Bálor (c) defeated Kyle O'Reilly by pinfall	Singles match for the NXT Championship	28:28
(c) / – the champion(s) heading into the match; D / – this was a dark match
