= Royal Rumble (2020) =

WWE pay-per-view and livestreaming event

- Promotional poster featuring various WWE wrestlers
- Promotion: WWE
- Brand(s): Raw; SmackDown
- Date: January 26, 2020
- City: Houston, Texas
- Venue: Minute Maid Park
- Attendance: 42,715

WWE event chronology
← Previous; Worlds Collide	Next → NXT TakeOver: Portland

Royal Rumble chronology
← Previous; 2019	Next → 2021

The 2020 Royal Rumble was a professional wrestling pay-per-view (PPV) and livestreaming event produced by WWE, held for wrestlers from the promotion's main roster brands, Raw and SmackDown. It was the 33rd annual Royal Rumble event and took place on January 26, 2020, at Minute Maid Park in Houston, Texas. This was the second Royal Rumble event held in Houston, after the 1989 event at The Summit, and fifth overall in the U.S. state of Texas, including the 1997, 2007, and 2017 events, which were in San Antonio.

The event was based around the Royal Rumble match, a modified 30-person battle royal in which the participants enter at timed intervals instead of all beginning in the ring at the same time and the respective men's and women's winners received a world championship match at WrestleMania. For the 2020 event, the winners received a choice of which championship to challenge for at WrestleMania 36, and for the first time, NXT's top championships were eligible choices. The men could choose to challenge for either Raw's WWE Championship, SmackDown's Universal Championship, or the NXT Championship, while the women had the choice between the Raw Women's Championship, the SmackDown Women's Championship, and the NXT Women's Championship. This was the first time since 2010 in which there were three eligible choices for the men's winner, and the first time there were three choices for the women. While the event itself was not promoted as an NXT event, wrestlers from the brand appeared in the Royal Rumble matches.

Eight matches were contested at the event, including two on the Kickoff pre-show. The main event was the 2020 Men's Royal Rumble match, which was won by Raw's Drew McIntyre, who last eliminated SmackDown's Roman Reigns. On the undercard, Raw's Charlotte Flair won the 2020 Women's Royal Rumble match by last eliminating NXT's Shayna Baszler. Other prominent matches saw "The Fiend" Bray Wyatt retain the Universal Championship against Daniel Bryan in a strap match, Roman Reigns defeated King Corbin in a Falls Count Anywhere match, and Becky Lynch defeated Asuka by submission to retain the Raw Women's Championship. The event also featured the in-ring return of Edge, who last wrestled at WrestleMania XXVII in April 2011 before retiring from a neck injury, as well as the WWE return of MVP, who last wrestled for the company in December 2010.

== Production ==
=== Background ===
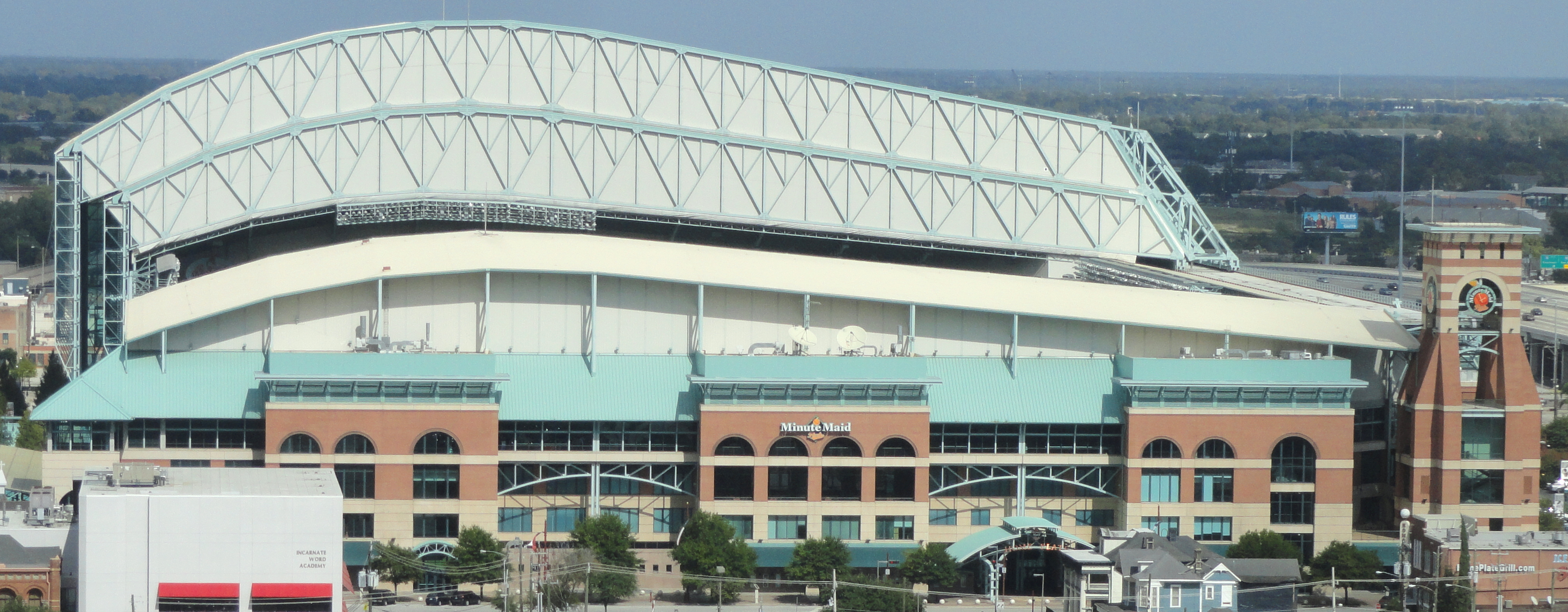
The 33rd annual Royal Rumble event was held at Minute Maid Park in Houston, Texas.

The Royal Rumble is an annual professional wrestling event, produced every January by WWE since 1988; that first event was a television special before it became a pay-per-view (PPV) event beginning in 1989 and then also available via livestreaming on the WWE Network since 2015. It is one of the promotion's original four PPVs, along with WrestleMania, SummerSlam, and Survivor Series, referred to as the "Big Four". It is named after and centered on the Royal Rumble match. Announced on February 15, 2019, the 33rd Royal Rumble event was scheduled to be held on January 26, 2020, at Minute Maid Park in Houston, Texas, marking the second Royal Rumble event held in Houston, after the 1989 event at The Summit, and fifth overall in the U.S. state of Texas, including the 1997, 2007, and 2017 events, which were in San Antonio. It featured wrestlers from the Raw and SmackDown brand divisions, with some NXT wrestlers and WWE veterans appearing in both the men's and women's Royal Rumble matches. Travel packages became available on September 12, 2019, while individual tickets went on sale on September 20.

The Royal Rumble match is a modified battle royal in which the participants enter at timed intervals instead of all beginning in the ring at the same time, and the match generally features 30 wrestlers. Since 1993, the winner traditionally earns a world championship match at that year's WrestleMania. At the prior two events, the men and women had the choice to challenge for the top championships of the Raw and SmackDown brands. In September 2019, NXT was recognized as WWE's third main brand, evidenced by its inclusion in the brand competition at the 2019 Survivor Series. Although the 2020 Royal Rumble was not promoted as an NXT event, for the first time, its titles became eligible options for the Royal Rumble winners, marking the first time since 2010 in which the men had three championship choices and the first time ever that women had three choices. For the 2020 event, the men and women could choose to challenge for any of the three brand's top championships at WrestleMania 36: the men could choose between Raw's WWE Championship, SmackDown's Universal Championship, and the NXT Championship, while the women had the choice between the Raw Women's Championship, the SmackDown Women's Championship, and the NXT Women's Championship.

=== Storylines ===
The event comprised eight matches, including two on the Kickoff pre-show, that resulted from scripted storylines. Results were predetermined by WWE's writers on the Raw and SmackDown brands, while storylines were produced on WWE's weekly television shows, Monday Night Raw and Friday Night SmackDown.

==== Raw ====
While the WWE Championship is generally defended at every year's Royal Rumble pay-per-view, on the January 6 episode of Raw, it was revealed that there would not be a WWE Championship defense at 2020's event. Instead, as he felt that there was no one on any brand who deserved an opportunity, WWE Champion Brock Lesnar decided to enter himself into the Royal Rumble match as entrant number one. There were no changes to the rules of the match, despite Lesnar holding one of the world championships that the winner could challenge for at WrestleMania 36. On the January 20 episode, Lesnar's advocate Paul Heyman reminded the fans of the prize of the Royal Rumble match, but said that there was no one worthy enough to face Lesnar in the main event of WrestleMania, implying that if Lesnar won, he would abstain his prize.

At TLC: Tables, Ladders & Chairs, The Kabuki Warriors (Asuka and Kairi Sane) defeated the team of Raw Women's Champion Becky Lynch and Charlotte Flair in a Tables, Ladders, and Chairs match to retain the WWE Women's Tag Team Championship. In a backstage interview on the following Raw, Lynch stated that she had not been herself the past few months and felt that management had been putting her into tag team matches to protect her from facing Asuka alone and losing. She also stated that she had never defeated Asuka and needed to change that. The following week, Lynch challenged Asuka to a match with her Raw Women's Championship on the line which Asuka accepted. The match was scheduled for the Royal Rumble as essentially a rematch from last year's event.

On the TLC: Tables, Ladders & Chairs Kickoff pre-show, Humberto Carrillo defeated Andrade. On the following episode of Raw, both were scheduled to participate in a gauntlet match to determine the number one contender against Rey Mysterio for the United States Championship. Carrillo advanced to the final to face Andrade, who did not appear during his entrance. Andrade instead attacked Carrillo from behind and then performed a Hammerlock DDT on Carillo onto the exposed concrete floor. Due to this, the gauntlet match ended in a no-contest. Andrade then won the US title from Mysterio at a WWE Live event in Madison Square Garden on December 26. After Andrade retained the title against Mysterio in a ladder match on the January 20 episode of Raw, Andrade attempted to perform the Hammerlock DDT on Mysterio on the exposed concrete floor, only for Carrillo to appear to aid Mysterio and fought off Andrade, who retreated along with Zelina Vega. Backstage, Carrillo issued a challenge to Andrade for the United States Championship at the Royal Rumble, which was made official for the Kickoff pre-show.

==== SmackDown ====
At Survivor Series, "The Fiend" Bray Wyatt defeated Daniel Bryan to retain the Universal Championship. On the following SmackDown, after Bryan accepted another rematch for the title at TLC: Tables, Ladders & Chairs, The Fiend appeared and attacked Bryan, ripping out his hair. The Miz, who had been intertwined in the feud, appeared the following week and said that Bryan had not been seen since The Fiend's attack and in turn became Wyatt's opponent in a non-title match at TLC, where Wyatt (as his Firefly Fun House character and not The Fiend) defeated Miz. Following the match, a hooded figure attacked Wyatt and then revealed himself as a returning Bryan, now with a buzz cut and shorter beard. On the following SmackDown, both Bryan and Miz stated their desire to take the Universal Championship from Wyatt due to their respective personal issues with him. They were then interrupted by King Corbin, who felt that he deserved an opportunity for the title due to his victory over Roman Reigns at TLC. On the December 27 episode, Bryan defeated Miz and Corbin in a triple threat match to earn another Universal Championship match against The Fiend at the Royal Rumble. On the January 17 episode, Bryan delivered a running knee to The Fiend and attacked him, only for The Fiend to retreat. Frustrated, Bryan changed the stipulation of their match to a strap match so that The Fiend could not run away.

During the triple threat match to determine the number one contender for the Universal Championship, Roman Reigns attacked King Corbin, costing him the title opportunity. The following week, Reigns announced his participation in the Royal Rumble match. Later that night, Reigns teamed with Daniel Bryan to face Corbin and Dolph Ziggler which ended in a no-contest. Following the match, Corbin and Ziggler attacked Reigns only for The Usos (Jey Uso and Jimmy Uso) to return and aid Reigns by attacking both Corbin and Ziggler. On the January 10 episode, Corbin announced his participation in the Royal Rumble match and stated that Reigns was scared to face him again, hence why Reigns was also competing in the match. In response, Reigns challenged Corbin to a rematch at the event which Corbin accepted. The following week, Reigns defeated the returning Robert Roode in a tables match, allowing him to choose the stipulation for his match with Corbin, and he chose a Falls Count Anywhere match.

On the SmackDown following Survivor Series, SmackDown Women's Champion Bayley and Team SmackDown women's captain Sasha Banks criticized their brand's women's division for letting them down at the event, as both Bayley and Team SmackDown lost their respective matches. Team member Lacey Evans interrupted and performed a Women's Right on Banks, with Evans turning face. Evans questioned the leadership of both Bayley and Banks, having several confrontations with them over the following weeks. On the January 10 episode, Evans was scheduled to face Banks, who no-showed and Bayley appeared on the TitanTron, taunting Evans. In response, Evans went backstage where the two brawled. The following week, Evans was once again scheduled to face Banks, however, Banks was unable to compete due to her injured ankle. Bayley took her place in the match, but lost to Evans. Due to Evans' win, she earned herself a title match at the Royal Rumble.

After a seven-month hiatus, Sheamus appeared in a vignette on the November 29 episode of SmackDown, announcing that he would be returning to in-ring action. Over the next several weeks, more vignettes aired, with Sheamus claiming that SmackDown had become soft in his absence. On the January 3 episode, as Shorty G was being attacked by The Revival (Scott Dawson and Dash Wilder), Sheamus returned, seemingly to aid Shorty G. However, after The Revival cleared the ring, Sheamus delivered a Brogue Kick to Shorty G. Sheamus claimed that Shorty G embodied everything wrong with SmackDown and continued to target him over the next few weeks, and a match between the two was scheduled for the Royal Rumble Kickoff pre-show.

== Event ==
Other on-screen personnel
Role:	Name:
English commentators	Michael Cole (SmackDown/Men's Royal Rumble match)
English commentators	Corey Graves (SmackDown/both Royal Rumble matches)
English commentators	Tom Phillips (Raw/Women's Royal Rumble match)
English commentators	Jerry Lawler (Raw/Women's Royal Rumble match)
English commentators	Booker T (Men's Royal Rumble match)
Spanish commentators	Carlos Cabrera
Spanish commentators	Marcelo Rodríguez
German commentators	Carsten Schaefer
German commentators	Tim Haber
German commentators	Calvin Knie
Ring announcers	Greg Hamilton (SmackDown/Men's Royal Rumble match)
Ring announcers	Mike Rome (Raw/Women's Royal Rumble match)
Referees	Danilo Anfibio
Referees	Jason Ayers
Referees	Shawn Bennett
Referees	Jessika Carr
Referees	John C
Referees	Dan Engler
Referees	Darrick Moore
Referees	Eddie Orengo
Referees	Darryl Sharma
Referees	Chris Sharpe
Referees	Ryan Tran
Referees	Rod Zapata
Interviewers	Kayla Braxton
Interviewers	Sarah Schreiber
Pre-show panel/correspondents	Jonathan Coachman
Pre-show panel/correspondents	Charly Caruso
Pre-show panel/correspondents	David Otunga
Pre-show panel/correspondents	Christian
Pre-show panel/correspondents	Renee Young
Pre-show panel/correspondents	Sam Roberts

=== Pre-show ===
Two matches were contested on the Royal Rumble Kickoff pre-show. In the first match, Sheamus faced Shorty G. In the end, Sheamus performed a Brogue Kick on Shorty G to win the match.

The second match saw Andrade defend the United States Championship against Humberto Carrillo. The end saw Carrillo attempt a hurricanrana on Andrade, who countered into a roll-up to retain the title.

=== Preliminary matches ===
The actual pay-per-view opened with Roman Reigns facing King Corbin in a Falls Count Anywhere match. Mid-way through the match, Reigns fought with Corbin in the crowd where Reigns performed a Samoan Drop on Corbin through two separate tables. As Reigns was about to attack Corbin near some production equipment, Reigns was attacked by Dolph Ziggler and Robert Roode. The Usos (Jey Uso and Jimmy Uso) then came out and attacked Ziggler and Roode with Jimmy performing a Samoan Drop on Jey, Roode, and Ziggler. Reigns then shoved Corbin into a portable toilet, tipped it over, and continued to attack Corbin throughout the crowd. In the end, Reigns performed a Superman Punch and Spear on Corbin atop a dugout to win the match.

Backstage, Kevin Owens told Samoa Joe that he could not wait to eliminate Seth Rollins from the Royal Rumble match—as they had been feuding for weeks on Raw—and that he would go on to win. Joe stated that he also could not wait to do the same, but if Owens got in his way, he would eliminate him.

Next was the women's Royal Rumble match, which began with SmackDown's Alexa Bliss as the first entrant and NXT's Bianca Belair as the second. During the match, Raw's Lana (the fifth entrant) and Liv Morgan (the seventh entrant) eliminated each other due to their ongoing rivalry. As SmackDown's Mandy Rose (the eighth entrant) was seemingly eliminated, she landed on top of Otis, who was on the floor. Belair attempted to eliminate Rose again, only for Otis to catch Rose. As Belair eliminated Rose's tag team partner Sonya Deville (the tenth entrant), Deville fell onto Rose and Otis, knocking Otis down and unintentionally eliminating Rose along with herself. Belair would go on to break Michelle McCool and Charlotte Flair's tied record of five eliminations in a single women's Royal Rumble match (McCool set the record in 2018 and Flair tied it in 2019), only to be eliminated by Raw's Charlotte Flair (#17). Mighty Molly, Naomi, Beth Phoenix, Kelly Kelly, and Santina Marella (entrants 3, 18, 19, 21, and 29, respectively) were all surprise entrants. NXT's Shayna Baszler entered last and ended up tying Belair's record of eight eliminations. In the climax, after Baszler eliminated Phoenix, Baszler attempted to eliminate Flair, but Flair prevented herself from being eliminated and eliminated Baszler to win the match and earn herself a women's championship match of her choosing at WrestleMania 36.

After that, Bayley defended the SmackDown Women's Championship against Lacey Evans. In the end, as Evans attempted a moonsault, Bayley avoided it and pinned Evans whilst holding the tights to retain the title.

Next, "The Fiend" Bray Wyatt defended the Universal Championship against Daniel Bryan in a strap match. The Fiend dominated the first half of the match, whipping Bryan with the strap. Bryan eventually gained the offense, and applied the LeBell Lock, using the strap to crank back on The Fiend's head. As Bryan attempted a running knee, The Fiend caught Bryan and performed a Sister Abigail for a near fall. Bryan then performed a running knee on The Fiend for a nearfall. In the end, The Fiend applied The Mandible Claw, and as Bryan tried to escape, The Fiend picked him up and performed a chokeslam while still applying the Mandible Claw to win the match and retain the title. Following the match, medical personnel tended to Bryan.

In the penultimate match, Becky Lynch defended the Raw Women's Championship against Asuka (accompanied by Kairi Sane). In the climax, as Asuka attempted to spit green mist in Lynch's face, Lynch kicked Asuka, causing her to spit the mist in the air and into her own face. Lynch then applied the Dis-arm-her on Asuka, forcing her to submit and retain the title.

=== Main event ===
The main event was the men's Royal Rumble match, which saw Raw's WWE Champion Brock Lesnar (accompanied by Paul Heyman) enter at number one. SmackDown's Elias entered second and sang a song during his entrance and taunted Lesnar until Lesnar ran out and chased Elias to the ring, where Lesnar bashed a guitar over Elias' back and quickly eliminated him. Lesnar would make quick work of the next few entrants (Erick Rowan, Robert Roode, and John Morrison), eliminating them almost as soon as they entered the match. SmackDown's Kofi Kingston, whom Lesnar defeated for the WWE Championship back in October, entered sixth followed by Rey Mysterio, who Lesnar recently feuded with, and then Kingston's New Day and SmackDown Tag Team Champion partner Big E. Kingston performed Trouble in Paradise on Lesnar, followed by a Big Ending by Big E and a 619 from Mysterio, but as Mysterio leapt at Lesnar, Lesnar caught him and eliminated him. After Lesnar leapt off of Big E's back to lay out Kingston with a clothesline, Lesnar eliminated Big E. Lesnar then performed an F5 on Kingston to eliminate him. Cesaro came in next, but didn't last long either, falling as yet another score for the Beast Incarnate. After Lesnar had a brief reunion with his old training partner Shelton Benjamin (the tenth entrant) and embracing him, Lesnar eliminated Benjamin after tricking him into thinking they would team up for the rest of the match. Shinsuke Nakamura (the eleventh entrant) suffered the same fate as all before him. The twelfth entrant saw the surprise return of Montel Vontavious Porter (who last wrestled in WWE in 2010), who was quickly eliminated by Lesnar. NXT's Keith Lee (the thirteenth entrant) and SmackDown's Braun Strowman (the fourteenth entrant) managed to subdue Lesnar and momentarily take him down. As Lee and Strowman attempted to eliminate each other, Lesnar managed to eliminate both at the same time, bringing Lesnar's total eliminations to 13, tying him with Strowman for the most eliminations in a single men's Royal Rumble match (a record Strowman set at 2018's Greatest Royal Rumble event).

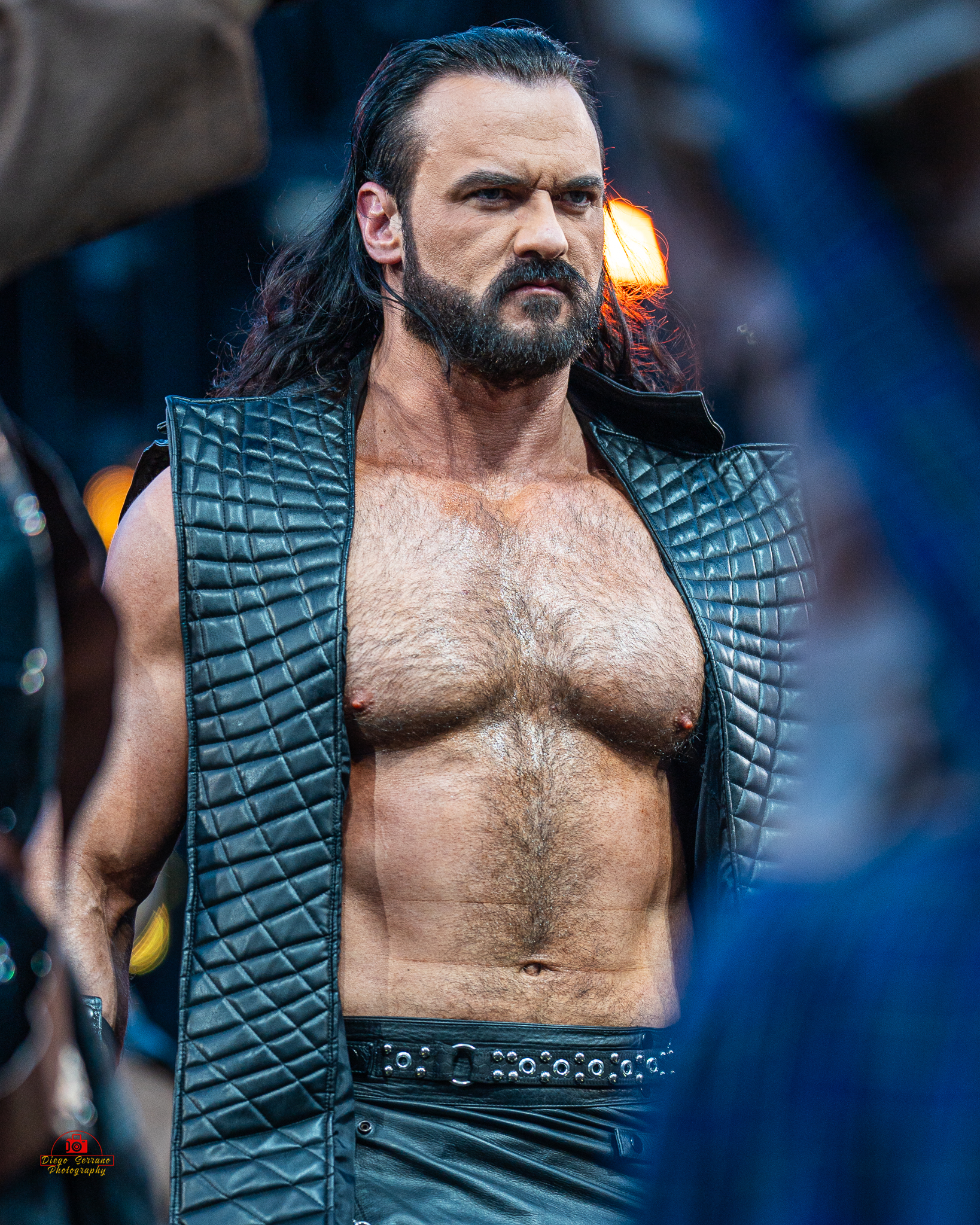
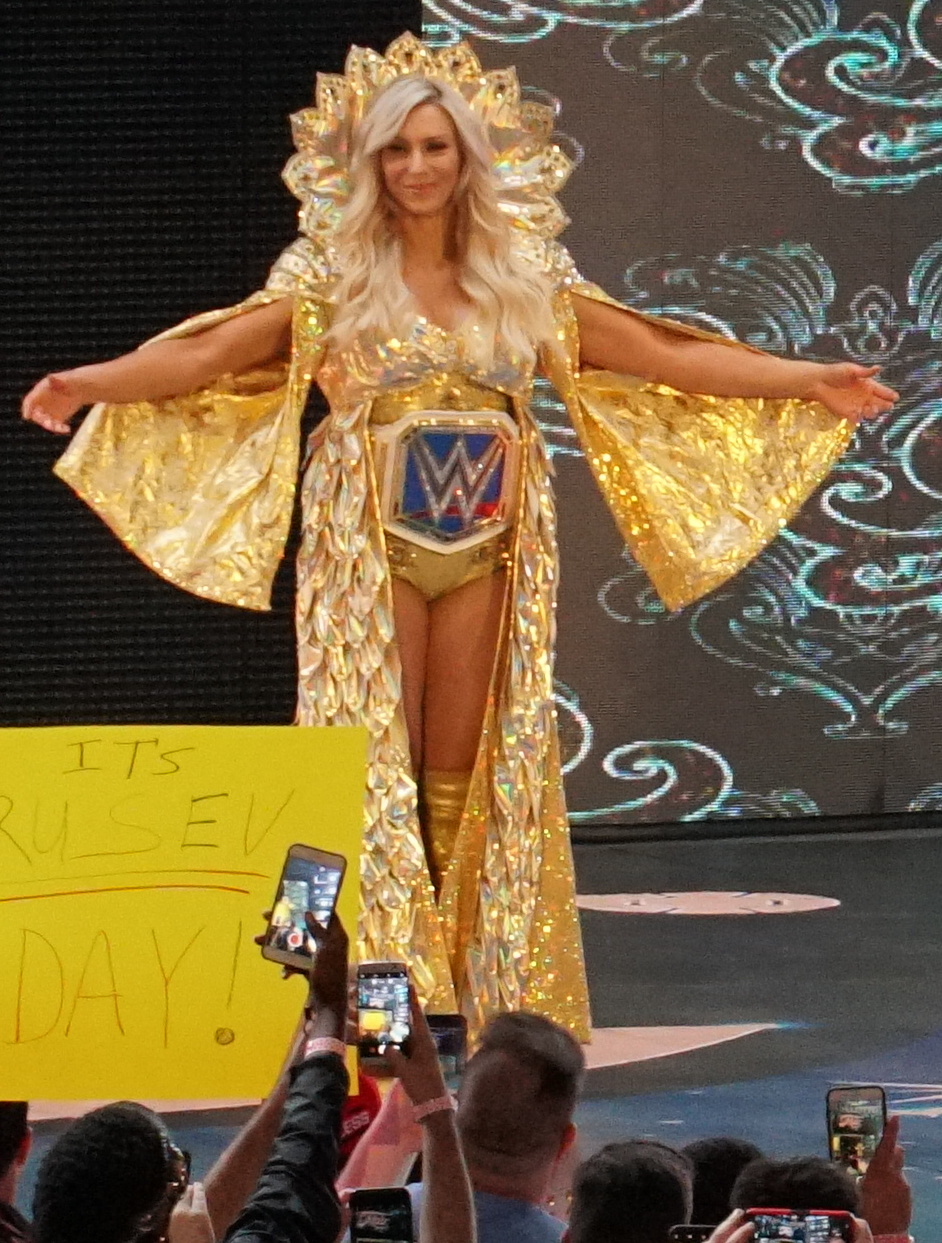
Drew McIntyre and Charlotte Flair were the respective winners of the men's and women's Royal Rumble matches.

Ricochet, who had a brief interaction with Lesnar on the previous episode of Raw, entered as the fifteenth entrant, followed by Drew McIntyre as the sixteenth entrant. With Lesnar's attention on McIntyre, Ricochet attacked Lesnar with a low blow from behind and McIntyre performed a Claymore on Lesnar to eliminate him. Following Lesnar's elimination, McIntyre stared him down. McIntyre then eliminated Ricochet and then continued to stare down Lesnar, who was still laid out at ringside, even after eliminating The Miz, until Lesnar left the ring. WWE Hall of Famer Edge, who was forced to retire from wrestling in 2011 due to a neck injury, made a surprise return as the twenty-first entrant. Kevin Owens (the twenty-seventh entrant), Aleister Black (the twenty-eighth entrant), and Samoa Joe (the twenty-ninth entrant) formed a small alliance against the other wrestlers, after which, they fought each other until Seth Rollins (accompanied by Buddy Murphy, Akam, and Rezar) entered last. Joe and Owens left the ring and brawled with the four. Rollins would eliminate Black, Joe, and Owens thanks to interference from Murphy, Akam, and Rezar, who then brawled with Joe, Black, and Owens, which spilled out of the ring. Roman Reigns (the twenty-sixth entrant) then performed a Superman Punch on Rollins, followed by a powerslam by Randy Orton (the twenty-fifth entrant) and a Claymore by McIntyre, who then eliminated Rollins. After a brief reunion of Rated-RKO between Edge and Orton, and after Orton teased an RKO on Edge, Edge quickly eliminated Orton. In the climax, after Edge was eliminated by Reigns, Reigns performed a Superman Punch on McIntyre and tried to eliminate him, but McIntyre countered and performed a Claymore on Reigns before eliminating him to win the match and earn himself a world championship match of his choosing at WrestleMania 36.

== Aftermath ==
=== Raw ===
The following night on Raw, Drew McIntyre announced that he would challenge Brock Lesnar, whom McIntyre eliminated during the men's Royal Rumble match, for the WWE Championship at WrestleMania 36. The following week, Ricochet, who aided in Lesnar's elimination, defeated Seth Rollins and Bobby Lashley in a triple threat match to also earn a WWE Championship match against Lesnar, taking place prior to WrestleMania at February's Super ShowDown event. At the event, Lesnar defeated Ricochet in ninety seconds, keeping him as the defending champion heading into his match against McIntyre at WrestleMania.

Also on the following Raw, women's Royal Rumble winner Charlotte Flair teased that she would reveal which champion she would challenge at WrestleMania, however, she stated that she was still deciding. The following week, Flair stated she had held both the Raw and SmackDown Women's Championships multiple times and had defeated their current holders, Becky Lynch and Bayley, respectively. She was then interrupted by NXT Women's Champion Rhea Ripley, who stated that Flair should challenge her as Flair had never beat her, but she had beaten Flair. Flair held off on making her decision until after Ripley had defended the title at NXT TakeOver: Portland on February 16. At the event, Ripley retained her title against Bianca Belair, after which, Flair attacked Ripley and Belair and accepted Ripley's WrestleMania challenge, marking the first time that the Royal Rumble winner chose an NXT title, which were previously ineligible.

Edge made his return to Raw the following night, stating that he had questioned what if he could wrestle again, and explained that after a second neck surgery and hard work, he was able to make his return at the Royal Rumble and would be able to retire on his own terms. Randy Orton then came out to welcome Edge back and suggested reforming their tag team, Rated-RKO, only to turn on Edge and perform an RKO on him, thus turning heel in the process. Orton then attacked Edge's neck with a steel chair and smashed his head between two steel chairs in a manoeuvre known as the "Conchairto", which Edge made famous in the past. A Last Man Standing match between the two was eventually scheduled for Night 2 of WrestleMania 36, which was won by Edge. Orton later challenged Edge to a normal singles match at Backlash, which Orton won. During the match, Edge legitimately tore his triceps. After recovering from his triceps tear, Edge returned at the 2021 Royal Rumble, where he and Orton entered at number one and two, respectively. The two brawled at ringside, and Edge injured Orton's leg, taking Orton out for the majority of the match. Orton returned in the closing moments of the match where he attempted to eliminate Edge, however, Edge countered and eliminated Orton to win the men's Royal Rumble match. Unsatisfied, Orton challenged Edge to a rubber match on the following night's Raw, where thanks to a distraction by Alexa Bliss (as part of a storyline between Orton, Bliss, and "The Fiend" Bray Wyatt), Edge defeated Orton, putting an end to their rivalry.

A United States Championship rematch between Humberto Carrillo and champion Andrade was scheduled for the next night on Raw, where Carrillo won by disqualification due to Zelina Vega's interference. Following the match, Carrillo performed a Hammerlock DDT on Andrade onto the exposed concrete, just as Andrade once did to Carrillo in the past. Andrade was then suspended for 30 days due to violating WWE's wellness policy, though was not stripped of the title. On the March 2 episode of Raw, Carrillo earned another shot at Andrade's U.S. title by pinning him in a tag team match. The match took place at Elimination Chamber, where Andrade retained.

Following the animosity between Lana and Liv Morgan, which caused Lana to eliminate Morgan after she herself was eliminated by Morgan, a match between the two was scheduled the next night on Raw, with Bobby Lashley and Rusev banned from ringside. Morgan would defeat Lana. After defeating Lana in a rematch the next week, Morgan was confronted by former Riott Squad stablemate Ruby Riott, making her return from injury. Riott went to embrace Morgan, after which she then attacked Morgan.

After making a surprise return at the Royal Rumble, Montel Vontavious Porter (MVP) faced Rey Mysterio on Raw in a losing effort. Afterwards, MVP announced that although he still had a few matches left on the independent circuit, his match on Raw was his final in WWE. This proved to be false, however, as after hosting a segment of the "VIP Lounge" in which he insulted men's Royal Rumble winner Drew McIntyre, MVP faced McIntyre in a match on the February 17 episode that McIntyre won. MVP would then become a mainstay on Raw, forming The Hurt Business faction, comprising Bobby Lashley, Shelton Benjamin, and Cedric Alexander.

Seth Rollins and Buddy Murphy defended the Raw Tag Team Championship against Samoa Joe and Kevin Owens. Joe was legitimately injured during the match and was taken backstage, leaving Owens to fend for himself, however, Rollins and Murphy retained the titles after Murphy pinned Owens with a roll-up. On February 7, Buddy Murphy's ring name was shortened to Murphy. Joe's injury proved to be minor, as he returned on the February 10 episode of Raw to aid Owens and The Viking Raiders (Erik and Ivar) against Rollins' stable.

On the February 3 episode of Raw, Asuka challenged Raw Women's Champion Becky Lynch to a rematch, and Lynch accepted for the following week. After Lynch retained the title, she was attacked by NXT's Shayna Baszler. Baszler then went on to win the women's Elimination Chamber match at Elimination Chamber to become the new number one contender for the title at WrestleMania 36.

=== SmackDown ===
A six-man tag team rematch from the previous week between the team of Roman Reigns and The Usos (Jey Uso and Jimmy Uso) and the team of King Corbin, Dolph Ziggler, and Robert Roode was scheduled for the following SmackDown in which the losers ate dog food. Reigns and The Usos won, and they dumped dog food over Corbin. The following week, Corbin challenged Reigns to one more match, and Reigns accepted as a Steel Cage match at Super ShowDown. At the event, Reigns defeated Corbin to end the feud.

Sheamus faced Shorty G in a rematch on the following SmackDown, where Sheamus was again victorious.

Mandy Rose thanked Otis for helping her in the women's Royal Rumble match. With encouragement from his Heavy Machinery tag team partner Tucker, Otis asked Rose out on a date and Rose accepted for Valentine's Day.

On the following SmackDown, Bayley addressed her victory over Lacey Evans, as well as Charlotte Flair's Royal Rumble win. She was interrupted by Naomi, who took exception to Bayley's claim that she had beaten everyone as she had never beaten Naomi. Bayley then attacked Naomi, who retaliated and got the upper hand. This marked Naomi's return to the SmackDown brand as prior to her six-month hiatus, she had been drafted to Raw in April 2019's Superstar Shake-up, but went undrafted during the WWE Draft in October. The following week, Naomi participated in a fatal four-way match to determine Bayley's next challenger, but it was won by Carmella. On the February 14 episode, Bayley pinned Carmella while using the ropes for leverage to retain the title. After the match, both Carmella and Naomi attacked Bayley. On the February 21 episode, Naomi defeated Carmella to become the number one contender for Bayley's SmackDown Women's Championship. The match was scheduled for Super ShowDown.

== Results ==
No.	Results	Stipulations	Times
1^{P}	Sheamus defeated Shorty G by pinfall	Singles match	12:35
2^{P}	Andrade (c) (with Zelina Vega) defeated Humberto Carrillo by pinfall	Singles match for the WWE United States Championship	14:20
3	Roman Reigns defeated King Corbin by pinfall	Falls Count Anywhere match	21:20
4	Charlotte Flair won by last eliminating Shayna Baszler	30-woman Royal Rumble match for a world championship match at WrestleMania 36	54:20
5	Bayley (c) defeated Lacey Evans by pinfall	Singles match for the WWE SmackDown Women's Championship	9:20
6	"The Fiend" Bray Wyatt (c) defeated Daniel Bryan by pinfall	Strap match for the WWE Universal Championship	17:35
7	Becky Lynch (c) defeated Asuka (with Kairi Sane) by submission	Singles match for the WWE Raw Women's Championship	16:25
8	Drew McIntyre won by last eliminating Roman Reigns	30-man Royal Rumble match for a world championship match at WrestleMania 36	1:00:10
(c) / – the champion(s) heading into the match; P / – the match was broadcast on the pre-show

=== Women's Royal Rumble match entrances and eliminations ===
– Raw
– SmackDown
– NXT
– NXT UK
– Hall of Famer (HOF)
– Unbranded
– Winner

Draw	Entrant	Brand/ Status	Order	Eliminated by	Time	Eliminations
1	Alexa Bliss	SmackDown	15	Bianca Belair	26:34	3
2	Bianca Belair	NXT	16	Charlotte Flair	33:20	8
3	Mighty Molly	HOF	3	Bianca Belair	10:21	0
4	Nikki Cross	SmackDown	5	Bianca Belair	15:08	0
5	Lana	Raw	1	Liv Morgan	02:29	1
6	Mercedes Martinez	NXT	4	Mandy Rose and Sonya Deville	08:14	0
7	Liv Morgan	Raw	2	Lana	00:44	1
8	Mandy Rose	SmackDown	6	Bianca Belair	08:49	1
9	Candice LeRae	NXT	8	Bianca Belair	09:01	0
10	Sonya Deville	SmackDown	7	Bianca Belair	05:31	1
11	Kairi Sane	Raw	9	Alexa Bliss	05:22	0
12	Mia Yim	NXT	11	Alexa Bliss	06:30	0
13	Dana Brooke	SmackDown	14	Bianca Belair	05:26	0
14	Tamina	SmackDown	10	Bianca Belair	00:39	0
15	Dakota Kai	NXT	12	Chelsea Green	01:32	0
16	Chelsea Green	NXT	13	Alexa Bliss	00:12	1
17	Charlotte Flair	Raw	–	Winner	27:19	4
18	Naomi	SmackDown	26	Shayna Baszler	22:01	0
19	Beth Phoenix	NXT/HOF	28	Shayna Baszler	23:05	1
20	Toni Storm	NXT UK	25	Shayna Baszler	18:40	0
21	Kelly Kelly	Unbranded	18	Charlotte Flair	02:29	0
22	Sarah Logan	Raw	17	Charlotte Flair	00:28	0
23	Natalya	Raw	27	Beth Phoenix	14:43	0
24	Xia Li	NXT	20	Shayna Baszler	10:49	0
25	Zelina Vega	Raw	22	Shayna Baszler	09:31	0
26	Shotzi Blackheart	NXT	23	Shayna Baszler	07:57	0
27	Carmella	SmackDown	24	Shayna Baszler	06:36	0
28	Tegan Nox	NXT	21	Shayna Baszler	03:50	0
29	Santina Marella	Unbranded	19	Self	01:01	1
30	Shayna Baszler	NXT	29	Charlotte Flair	04:27	8

=== Men's Royal Rumble match entrances and eliminations ===
– Raw
– SmackDown
– NXT
– Hall of Famer (HOF)
– Unbranded
– Winner

Draw	Entrant	Brand/ Status	Order	Eliminated by	Time	Eliminations
1	Brock Lesnar	Raw	14	Drew McIntyre	26:24	13
2	Elias	SmackDown	1	Brock Lesnar	01:00	0
3	Erick Rowan	Raw	2	Brock Lesnar	00:08	0
4	Robert Roode	SmackDown	3	Brock Lesnar	00:41	0
5	John Morrison	SmackDown	4	Brock Lesnar	00:09	0
6	Kofi Kingston	SmackDown	7	Brock Lesnar	05:06	0
7	Rey Mysterio	Raw	5	Brock Lesnar	02:54	0
8	Big E	SmackDown	6	Brock Lesnar	00:53	0
9	Cesaro	SmackDown	8	Brock Lesnar	00:18	0
10	Shelton Benjamin	Raw	9	Brock Lesnar	00:37	0
11	Shinsuke Nakamura	SmackDown	10	Brock Lesnar	00:20	0
12	MVP	Unbranded	11	Brock Lesnar	00:24	0
13	Keith Lee	NXT	12	Brock Lesnar and Braun Strowman	03:32	1
14	Braun Strowman	SmackDown	13	Brock Lesnar and Keith Lee	01:50	1
15	Ricochet	Raw	15	Drew McIntyre	03:09	0
16	Drew McIntyre	Raw	—	Winner	34:11	6
17	The Miz	SmackDown	16	Drew McIntyre	00:30	0
18	AJ Styles	Raw	17	Edge	07:49	0
19	Dolph Ziggler	SmackDown	22	Roman Reigns	12:20	0
20	Karl Anderson	Raw	21	Randy Orton	09:46	0
21	Edge	HOF	28	Roman Reigns	23:43	3
22	King Corbin	SmackDown	19	Drew McIntyre	04:06	1
23	Matt Riddle	NXT	18	King Corbin	00:41	0
24	Luke Gallows	Raw	20	Edge	02:00	0
25	Randy Orton	Raw	27	Edge	14:37	1
26	Roman Reigns	SmackDown	29	Drew McIntyre	16:01	2
27	Kevin Owens	Raw	24	Seth Rollins, Akam, and Rezar	06:59	0
28	Aleister Black	Raw	23	Seth Rollins	05:06	0
29	Samoa Joe	Raw	25	Seth Rollins	04:25	0
30	Seth Rollins	Raw	26	Drew McIntyre	04:01	3

^2Brock Lesnar tied Braun Strowman's record for the most eliminations in the Royal Rumble match, eliminating 13 men. This record was previously held by Roman Reigns, who eliminated 12 men at the 2014 Royal Rumble.
^3Akam and Rezar were not official participants in the match.
