= Sarah Logan =

American professional wrestler (born 1993)

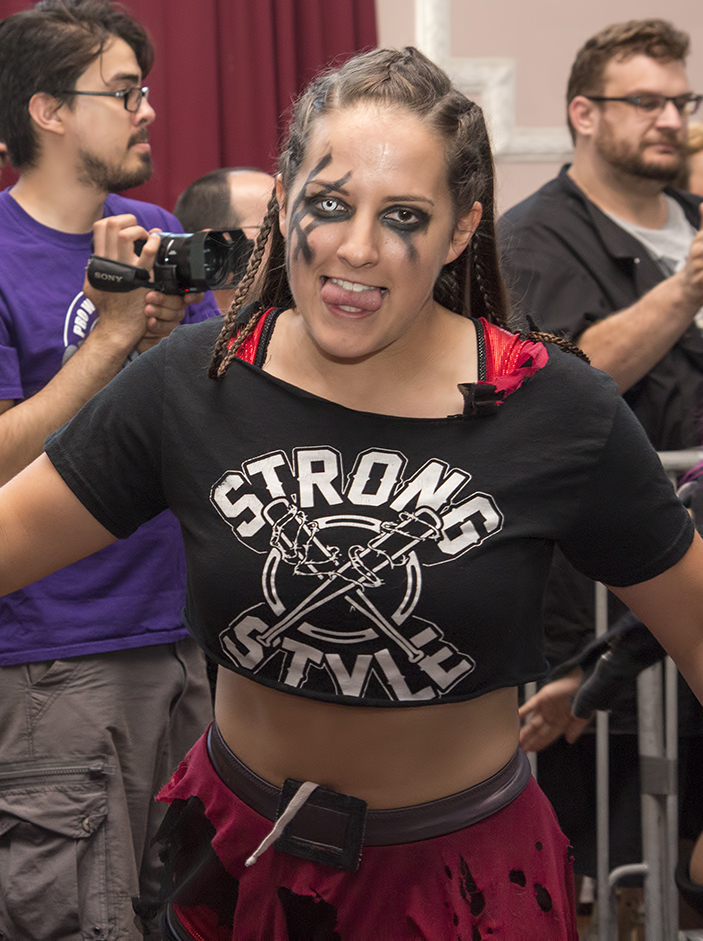
- Logan on June 25, 2016

Personal information
- Born: Sarah Bridges; September 10, 1993 (age 33) Louisville, Kentucky, U.S.
- Spouse: Raymond Rowe (m. 2018)
- Children: 3

Professional wrestling career
- Ring name(s): Crazy Mary Dobson; Mary Dobson; Sarah Bridges; Sarah Dobson; Sarah Logan; Sarah Rowe; Valhalla
- Billed height: 5 ft 6 in (168 cm)
- Billed weight: 139 lb (63 kg)
- Billed from: Louisville, Kentucky
- Trained by: Mad Man Pondo; Mickie Knuckles; Taka Michinoku
- Debut: November 8, 2011
- Retired: February 26, 2026

Sarah Rowe (née Bridges; born September 10, 1993) is an American retired professional wrestler. She is best known for her tenure in WWE, where she performed under the ring names Sarah Logan and Valhalla.

Bridges began her career in 2011 and worked for 5 years on the independent circuit as Crazy Mary Dobson. In 2016 signed a contract with WWE and was assigned to NXT, where he changed her ringname to Sarah Logan. She made her main roster debut the next year as part of the stable The Riott Squad with Ruby Riott and Liv Morgan. The stable disbanded in 2019 and was released the next year. WWE signed her again in 2022 and worked with the promotion until 2025. During her second stint, she worked first as Sarah Logan, but later she changed her character to Valhalla, managing The War Raiders.

== Early life ==
Sarah Bridges was born on September 10, 1993, in Louisville, Kentucky. She attended Jeffersonville High School in Jeffersonville, Indiana.

== Professional wrestling career ==
=== Independent circuit (2011–2016) ===
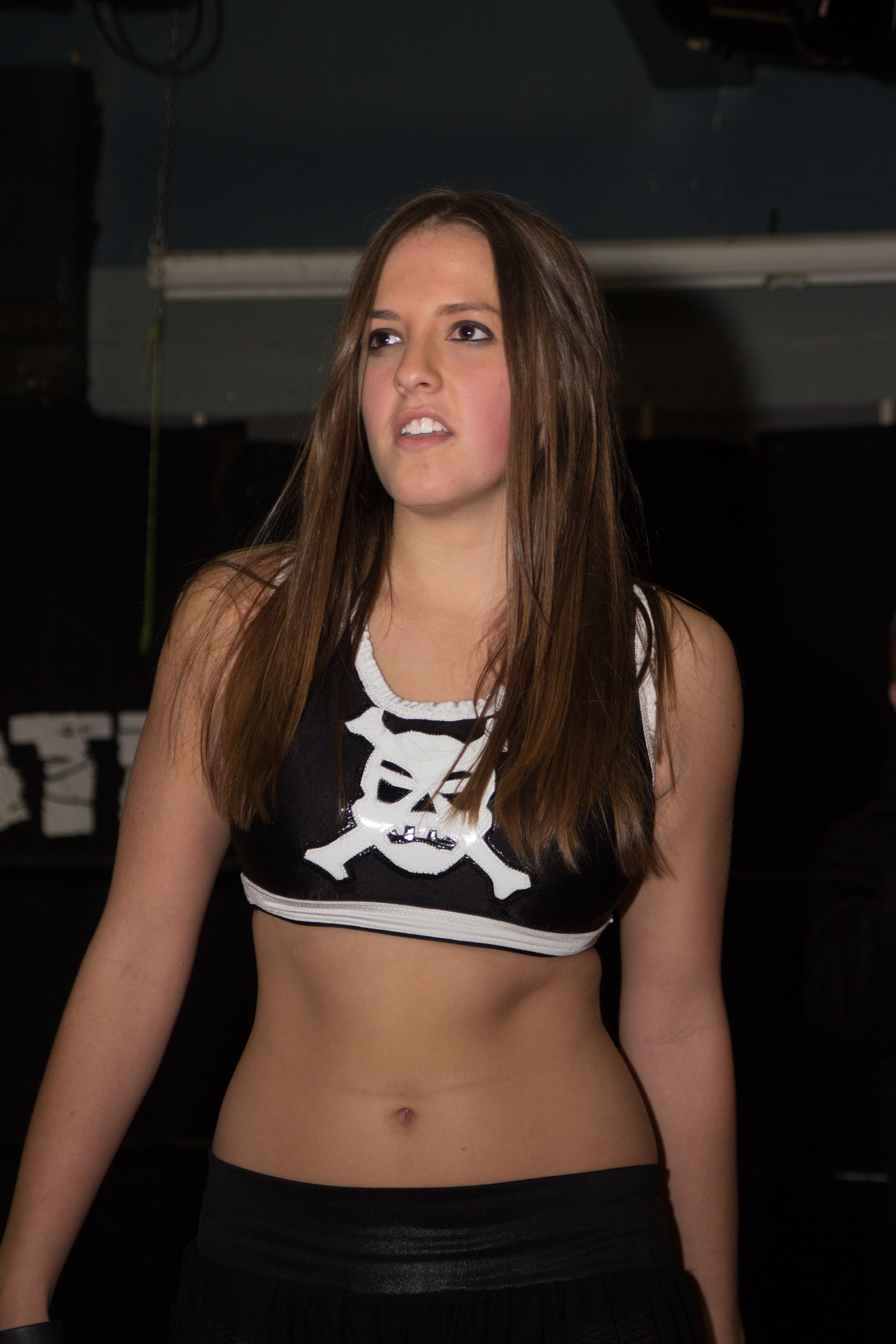
Dobson in 2013

Bridges began her professional wrestling career in 2011, under the ring name Crazy Mary Dobson, with her first match being against Mickie Knuckles for the IWA East Coast promotion. She also pinned Viper in a ten-person tag team match in her debut in the American Pro Wrestling Alliance. Dobson then wrestled for various independent wrestling organizations across the United States and Europe including Insane Championship Wrestling (ICW), Shimmer Women Athletes, Ring of Honor (ROH), and Juggalo Championship Wrestling (JCW). On February 21, 2015, at JCW's Take Me Home show, Dobson teamed with Mad Man Pondo to defeat The Hooligans (Devin Cutter and Mason Cutter) to win the JCW Tag Team Championships.

=== WWE ===
==== Early appearances (2014–2017) ====
Bridges made an appearance during a segment on the September 1, 2014 episode of Raw as the makeup artist for The Miz before appearing in a speaking role in November 2014 as a concession manager. On the March 2, 2015 episode of Raw, Bridges appeared in a non-speaking role in a Niagara (a spoof of Viagra) commercial featuring The Miz and Damien Mizdow. On the April 29 episode of NXT, she faced Becky Lynch in a losing effort.

On October 19, 2016, it was announced that Bridges signed a contract with WWE. On the January 11, 2017 episode of NXT, Bridges made her first televised appearance under her real name, teaming with Macey Evans in a losing effort against The Iconic Duo (Billie Kay and Peyton Royce) in a tag team match. Bridges returned on the June 7 episode of NXT under the ring name Sarah Logan, where she was defeated by Royce. After being absent from NXT in-ring competition, Logan returned on the August 23 episode of NXT, where she was again defeated by Royce. On the October 25 episode of NXT, Logan participated in a battle royal to gain a spot at the fatal four-way match for the vacant NXT Women's Championship at NXT TakeOver: WarGames, in which she was unsuccessful, and turned out to be her last live broadcast appearance in NXT.

On June 16, 2017, Logan was announced as one of the first four participants competing in the Mae Young Classic. On August 28, Logan was eliminated in the first round by Mia Yim. On September 11, despite being eliminated from the tournament, Logan teamed with other eliminated competitors in a six-women tag team among them Santana Garrett and Marti Belle being defeated by Tessa Blanchard, Kay Lee Ray and Jazzy Gabert.

==== The Riott Squad (2017–2019) ====
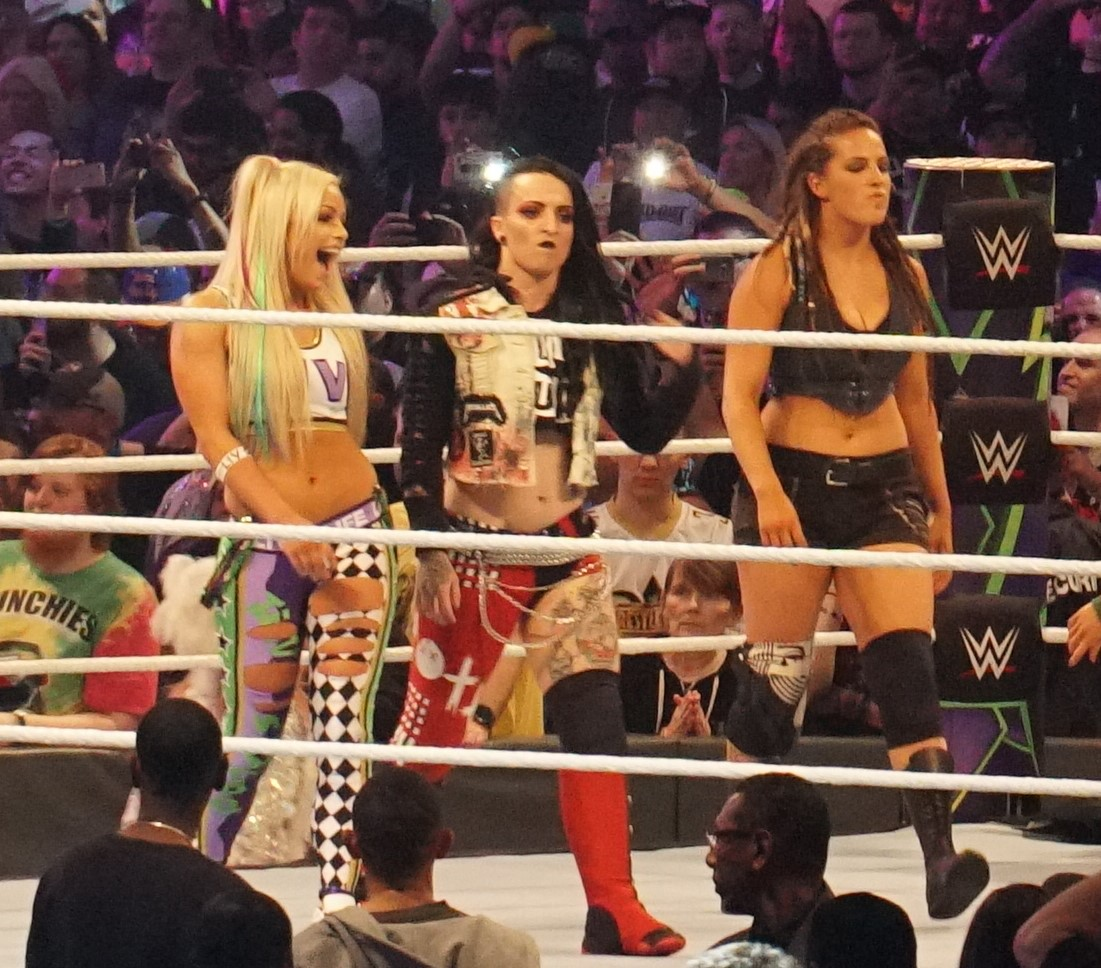
Logan (right) along with fellow members of The Riott Squad Ruby Riott (center) and Liv Morgan (left) at WrestleMania 34

On the November 21, 2017, episode of SmackDown, Logan made her debut, along with Ruby Riott and Liv Morgan, by attacking both Becky Lynch and Naomi, establishing themselves as heels in the process. On the same night, they interrupted a match between SmackDown Women's Champion Charlotte Flair and Natalya and attacked them both. The following week on SmackDown, the trio, now called The Riott Squad, made their in-ring debuts for the brand, defeating Flair, Natalya, and Naomi in a six-woman tag team match.

Over the following months, The Riott Squad continued to compete against Flair and Naomi. On the December 19 episode of SmackDown, Logan and Riott lost to Flair and Naomi. On the January 16 episode of SmackDown, The Riott Squad defeated Flair, Naomi, and Becky Lynch. Logan then participated in the first women's Royal Rumble match at the Royal Rumble pay-per-view as the third entrant, but was eliminated by Molly Holly.

During the 2018 Superstar Shake-Up, The Riott Squad was drafted to Raw and caused the match between Bayley and Sasha Banks to end in a no contest. During the July 16 episode of Raw, Sarah picked up her first singles victory in WWE with a win over Ember Moon. Logan also debuted a new Viking-inspired gimmick, wearing war paint and the commentary team making several references to her "discovering her Viking heritage". On February 17, 2019, Logan and Morgan competed in a six–team Elimination Chamber match for the inaugural WWE Women's Tag Team Championship, at the namesake pay–per–view, where they were the third team eliminated by Nia Jax and Tamina but the eventual winners were Bayley and Sasha Banks. Logan competed at WrestleMania 35 in a women's battle royal match to decide the winner of a trophy, but after assuming she had won, Carmella eliminated her at the last moment.

==== Singles competition (2019–2020) ====
On April 16, as part of the 2019 WWE Superstar Shake-up, Liv Morgan was moved to SmackDown, effectively ending The Riott Squad. Logan would transition into a singles competitor, debuting a new look and entrance theme, while also beginning a feud with Dana Brooke on Main Event, where they traded wins with one another. At Survivor Series on November 24, Logan was part of Team Raw and competed in the triple threat women's elimination match against Team SmackDown and Team NXT, where she was eliminated by Bianca Belair. On the January 6 episode of Raw, Logan began a feud with Charlotte Flair after she attacked her before their match and stepped on her robe. The following week, Logan was defeated by Flair while also declaring herself as an entrant in the Women's Royal Rumble match. At the event, she entered the Royal Rumble match at number 22 but was eliminated in less than 30 seconds by Flair.

Logan would then be the guest referee during Liv Morgan's match against Ruby Riott, where she helped Morgan win by fast counting Riott. After the match, Logan would attack Morgan. Logan was announced as part of the Elimination Chamber match against Morgan, Riott, Natalya, Shayna Baszler and half of the WWE Women's Tag Team Champions Asuka for a chance at Becky Lynch's WWE Raw Women's Championship at WrestleMania 36. At the namesake pay–per–view, she was the third entrant, but the first to be eliminated by Baszler, who was the eventual winner, earning a shot at the Raw women's title and setting a record by eliminating every other woman, in what was essentially a squash match. On the April 13, 2020 edition of Raw, Logan once again lost to Baszler in a Women's Money in the Bank qualifying match by referee's decision after Baszler stomped Logan's arm. On April 15, 2020, Rowe was released from her WWE contract as a result of budget cuts due to the COVID-19 pandemic. On June 22, 2020, Rowe announced that she would be stepping away from professional wrestling "for the foreseeable future".

=== Return to WWE (2022–2025) ===
On January 29, 2022, Rowe made a surprise return to WWE at Royal Rumble, reprising her Sarah Logan character, entering the match at number 25, briefly reuniting with Morgan and lasting only 43 seconds until she was eliminated by The Bella Twins (Nikki and Brie Bella). Later in November, she made a full-time return, joining The Viking Raiders and adopting the new ring name of Valhalla. As part of the 2023 WWE Draft, Valhalla, along with Erik and Ivar, was drafted to the Raw brand. On January 27, 2024, Valhalla entered the Royal Rumble match at the titular event as the 24th entrant. As she was walking to the ring, R-Truth entered the women's Royal Rumble match thinking it was the men's Royal Rumble match. Due to the confusion caused by R-Truth, Valhalla was immediately eliminated by Nia Jax after she entered the ring.

In April 2024, Valhalla began maternity leave after announcing that she and her husband would be expecting their second child. On June 2, 2025, Valhalla announced via Instagram that WWE had chosen not to renew her contract and retired in 2026.

== Other media ==
Bridges appeared as a playable character in video games WWE 2K19 and WWE 2K20 as Sarah Logan. She later appeared in WWE 2K23 (as DLC), WWE 2K24, and WWE 2K25 as Valhalla.

== Personal life ==
On March 29, 2011, Bridges was involved in a car accident after a CSX train struck her white Chevy coupe on Route 62 in Charlestown, Indiana. She was airlifted to the hospital in Louisville.

On December 21, 2018, Bridges married fellow professional wrestler Raymond Rowe (who wrestles under the ring name Erik), in a Viking themed wedding. They have two sons, Raymond Cash Rowe, born February 9, 2021, and Ezekiel Joseph Rowe, born November 28, 2024. On March 20, 2026, the couple announced that they were expecting their third child. Rowe gave birth to a daughter, named Dena Elizabeth Rowe, on October 20, 2026.

== Championships and accomplishments ==
- American Pro Wrestling Alliance
  - APWA World Ladies Championship (1 time)
- Juggalo Championship Wrestling
  - JCW Tag Team Championship (1 time) – with Mad Man Pondo
- Pro Wrestling Illustrated
  - Ranked No. 33 of the top 100 female wrestlers in the PWI Female 100 in 2018
- Resistance Pro Wrestling
  - RPW Women's Championship (1 time)
  - Samuel J. Thompson Memorial Women's Tournament (2015)
- Windy City Pro Wrestling
  - WCPW Middleweight Championship (1 time)
