= Elimination Chamber (2019) =

WWE pay-per-view and livestreaming event

- Promotional poster featuring Mustafa Ali, Daniel Bryan, AJ Styles, Jeff Hardy, Randy Orton, Samoa Joe, and the Elimination Chamber structure
- Promotion: WWE
- Brand(s): Raw; SmackDown; 205 Live
- Date: February 17, 2019
- City: Houston, Texas
- Venue: Toyota Center
- Attendance: 10,200

WWE event chronology
← Previous; Halftime Heat	Next → Fastlane

Elimination Chamber chronology
← Previous; 2018	Next → 2020

The 2019 Elimination Chamber (known as No Escape in Germany) was a professional wrestling pay-per-view (PPV) and livestreaming event produced by WWE, held for wrestlers from the promotion's main roster brands, Raw, SmackDown, and 205 Live. It was the ninth Elimination Chamber event and took place on February 17, 2019, at the Toyota Center in Houston, Texas. The event centered on the Elimination Chamber match, a type of roofed steel cage that surrounds the ring and ringside area with no disqualifications; the objective is to eliminate all other opponents either by pinfall or submission with championship implications at stake.

Seven matches were contested at the event, including one on the Kickoff pre-show. Two Elimination Chamber matches were held, including the main event in which Daniel Bryan defeated AJ Styles, Samoa Joe, Kofi Kingston, Randy Orton, and Jeff Hardy to retain SmackDown's WWE Championship. In the other, which was the opening bout and was an interbrand women's tag team Elimination Chamber match, Raw's The Boss 'n' Hug Connection (Bayley and Sasha Banks) defeated the teams of Nia Jax and Tamina and The Riott Squad (Liv Morgan and Sarah Logan) from Raw and the teams of Carmella and Naomi, Mandy Rose and Sonya Deville, and The IIconics (Billie Kay and Peyton Royce) from SmackDown to become the inaugural holders of the WWE Women's Tag Team Championship. In other prominent matches, Finn Bálor defeated defending champion Bobby Lashley and Lio Rush in a 2-on-1 handicap match to win Raw's Intercontinental Championship and Ronda Rousey defeated Ruby Riott to retain the Raw Women's Championship.

Following the discontinuation of brand-exclusive PPV and livestreaming events for the main roster under the second brand split after WrestleMania 34 in April 2018, this was the first Elimination Chamber event since 2011 to feature multiple brands during a brand split. It was also the first to feature three brands.

== Production ==
=== Background ===
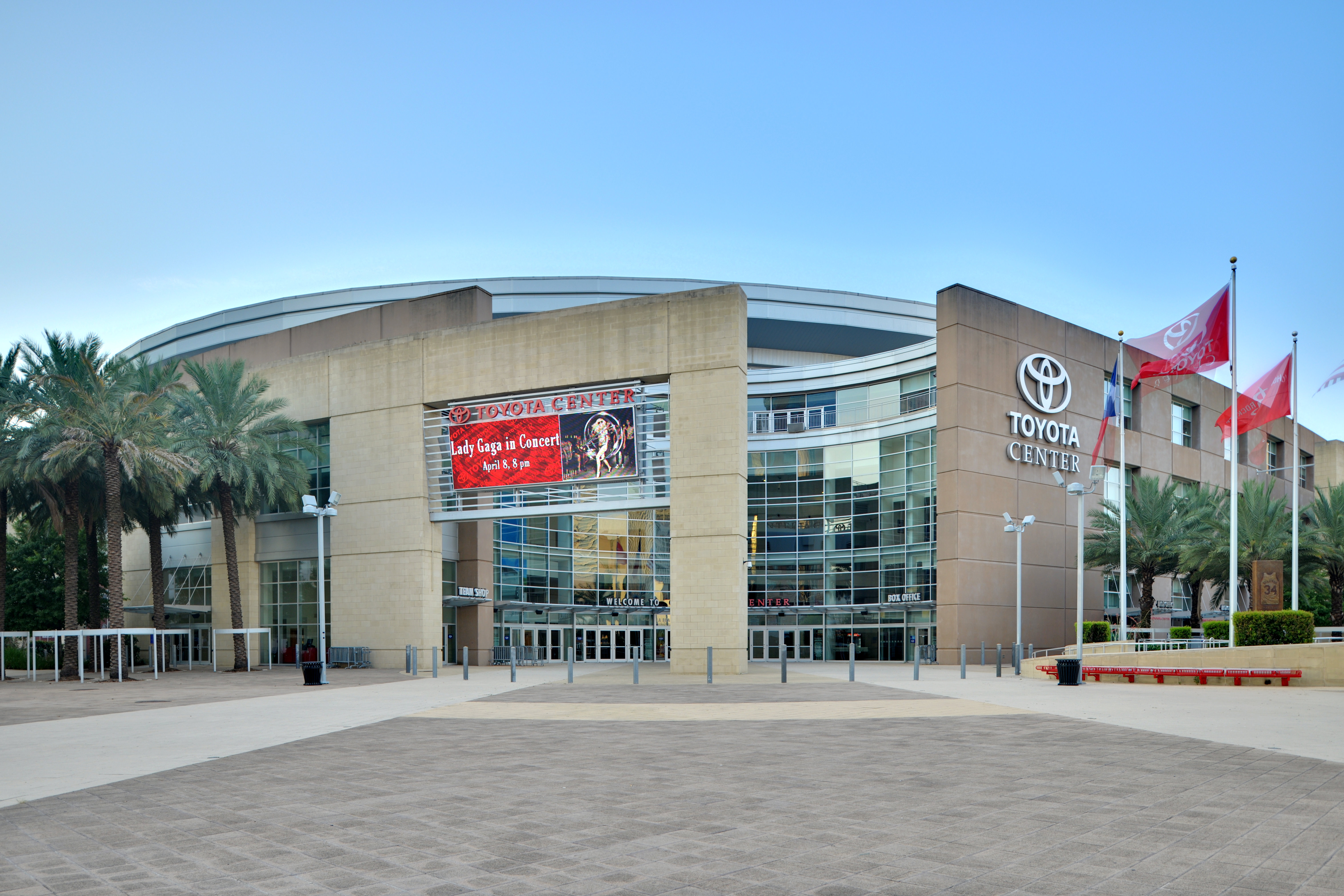
The ninth Elimination Chamber event was held at the Toyota Center in Houston, Texas.

Elimination Chamber is a professional wrestling event first produced by WWE in 2010. It has been held every year since, except in 2016, generally in February. It was originally broadcast exclusively via pay-per-view (PPV) before it began simultaneously livestreaming on the WWE Network in 2015. The concept of the event is that one or two main event matches are contested inside the Elimination Chamber, either with championships or future opportunities at championships at stake. Announced on November 22, 2018, the ninth Elimination Chamber event was scheduled to take place on February 17, 2019, at the Toyota Center in Houston, Texas. Tickets went on sale on December 7, 2018.

While the 2018 event was held exclusively for the Raw brand division, the 2019 event featured wrestlers from Raw, SmackDown, and 205 Live, as following WrestleMania 34 in April 2018, WWE discontinued brand-exclusive PPV and livestreaming events for the main roster. This made it the first Elimination Chamber since 2011 to feature multiple brands during a brand split as well as the first to feature three brands.

The Elimination Chamber match is an elimination-based match contested in a type of large roofed steel cage that surrounds the wrestling ring with an elevated platform around the ring. Within the Chamber are four inner pods, one behind each ring post. The match is contested by six participants. Two wrestlers start the match, while the other four are held within each inner pod with one selected randomly to enter the match at regular intervals, which continues until all four have been released. The objective is to eliminate all other opponents by pinfall or submission, and there are no disqualifications or count-outs. In the case of a tag team Elimination Chamber match, the rules are mostly the same, except two teams (four wrestlers) start the match, both members of a team are released from their pod at the same time, and only one person from a team has to be eliminated to eliminate both members of that team.

In 2011 and since 2013, the show has been promoted as "No Escape" in Germany as it was feared that the name "Elimination Chamber" may remind people of the gas chambers used during the Holocaust; it was promoted as "No Way Out" in 2010 and 2012.

=== Storylines ===
The event comprised seven matches, including one on the Kickoff pre-show, that resulted from scripted storylines. Results were predetermined by WWE's writers on the Raw, SmackDown, and 205 Live brands, while storylines were produced on WWE's weekly television shows, Monday Night Raw, SmackDown Live, and the cruiserweight-exclusive 205 Live.

On the December 24, 2018, episode of Raw, WWE Chairman Vince McMahon announced that a new WWE Women's Tag Team Championship would be introduced in 2019. On the January 14, 2019, episode of Raw, on her segment "A Moment of Bliss", Alexa Bliss unveiled the championship belts and revealed that the inaugural champions would be determined at Elimination Chamber in a tag team Elimination Chamber match, featuring three teams from Raw and SmackDown each, making the championship non-exclusive to either brand. Qualification matches to determine the three teams from Raw took place on the January 28 and February 4 episodes of Raw: the teams of Nia Jax and Tamina, The Riott Squad (Liv Morgan and Sarah Logan), and The Boss 'n' Hug Connection (Bayley and Sasha Banks) each qualified by defeating the teams of Bliss and Mickie James, Natalya and Dana Brooke, and Alicia Fox and Nikki Cross, respectively. Due to its smaller roster, no qualification matches were held for SmackDown and instead, the teams of Sonya Deville and Mandy Rose, The IIconics (Billie Kay and Peyton Royce), and Naomi and Carmella all announced their participation. On the February 11 and February 12 episodes of Raw and SmackDown, triple threat tag team matches occurred between each brand's three respective tag teams to determine which two teams would start the Elimination Chamber match. Bayley and Rose were pinned in their respective matches, making Banks and Bayley, and Deville and Rose the first entrants in the chamber.

At the Royal Rumble, The Miz and Shane McMahon defeated The Bar (Cesaro and Sheamus) to win the SmackDown Tag Team Championship. On the following episode of SmackDown, The Usos (Jey Uso and Jimmy Uso) defeated The Bar, The New Day (Big E and Kofi Kingston), and Heavy Machinery (Otis Dozovic and Tucker Knight) in a fatal four-way tag team elimination match to earn a championship match at Elimination Chamber.

At the Royal Rumble, Daniel Bryan defeated AJ Styles to retain the WWE Championship with help from the returning Rowan. On the following episode of SmackDown, Bryan, along with Rowan, disposed the standard leather-bound title belt with metal plates in a garbage can and introduced a new custom belt made from hemp and wood. Styles then confronted Bryan and Rowan, followed by Randy Orton, Samoa Joe, Jeff Hardy, and Mustafa Ali. After an ensuing brawl, WWE Chief Operating Officer Paul "Triple H" Levesque scheduled Bryan to defend the championship against the five in an Elimination Chamber match at the pay-per-view. A gauntlet match between the six was scheduled for the February 12 episode to determine who would enter the chamber last. Due to a legitimate injury, however, Ali was pulled from the match and replaced with The New Day's Kofi Kingston. Orton won the ensuing gauntlet match, making him the last entrant in the chamber.

On the February 4 episode of Raw, Raw Women's Champion Ronda Rousey issued an open challenge for the title. The Riott Squad (Ruby Riott, Liv Morgan, and Sarah Logan) came out and Morgan accepted the challenge, but was defeated. Immediately after, Logan stepped up, but was also defeated. Riott did not attempt to challenge Rousey and instead retreated with her Squad. In a backstage interview, Riott stated that she was ensuring that her teammates were okay and claimed that she could defeat Rousey at any time. Later, it was revealed that Rousey would defend her championship against Riott at Elimination Chamber.

On the January 28 episode of Raw, while Finn Bálor was addressing his loss to Universal Champion Brock Lesnar at the Royal Rumble, he was interrupted by Intercontinental Champion Bobby Lashley and his manager Lio Rush. Lashley claimed that he was better than Lesnar and then attacked Bálor. The following week, Bálor was scheduled to face Lashley, but Lashley instead had Bálor face Rush. Lashley stated that depending on Bálor's performance, he would consider giving him a title shot, but before the match could begin, Lashley attacked Bálor. Despite this, Bálor defeated Rush. Bálor was then scheduled to face both Lashley and Rush in a handicap match at Elimination Chamber with Lashley's Intercontinental Championship on the line.

During the second half of 2018, Baron Corbin served as the Acting Raw General Manager. During this time, Braun Strowman was on the receiving end of his authority, including Corbin costing Strowman the Universal Championship at Crown Jewel. At TLC: Tables, Ladders & Chairs, Strowman defeated Corbin in the titular match, thus stripping Corbin of his authoritative power and earning another Universal Championship match at the Royal Rumble. However, Corbin also caused Strowman to lose this title opportunity. After a confrontation between the two on the January 14 episode of Raw, Strowman chased Corbin to the backstage area where Corbin hid in what was later revealed to be Vince McMahon's limousine. Strowman destroyed the limo, resulting in Mr. McMahon fining him $100,000 and cancelling his championship match. Strowman and Corbin continued going at each other over the next couple of weeks and a no disqualification match between the two was scheduled for Elimination Chamber.

On the Royal Rumble Kickoff pre-show, Buddy Murphy defeated Kalisto, Akira Tozawa, and Hideo Itami in a fatal four-way match to retain the WWE Cruiserweight Championship. On the February 5, 2019, episode of 205 Live, Tozawa defeated Cedric Alexander, Lio Rush, and Humberto Carrillo in a fatal four-way elimination match to earn another championship match against Murphy on the Elimination Chamber Kickoff pre-show.

== Event ==
Other on-screen personnel
Role:	Name:
English commentators	Michael Cole (Raw/Women's Tag Team Elimination Chamber match)
English commentators	Corey Graves (Raw/SmackDown/both Elimination Chamber matches)
English commentators	Renee Young (Raw/Women's Tag Team Elimination Chamber match)
English commentators	Tom Phillips (SmackDown)
English commentators	Byron Saxton (SmackDown)
English commentators	Vic Joseph (205 Live)
English commentators	Nigel McGuinness (205 Live)
English commentators	Aiden English (205 Live)
English commentators	Beth Phoenix (Women's Tag Team Elimination Chamber match)
Spanish commentators	Carlos Cabrera
Spanish commentators	Marcelo Rodríguez
German commentators	Carsten Schaefer
German commentators	Tim Haber
German commentators	Calvin Knie
Ring announcers	Greg Hamilton (SmackDown/205 Live)
Ring announcers	Mike Rome (Raw/Women's Tag Team Elimination Chamber match)
Referees	Danilo Anfibio
Referees	Jason Ayers
Referees	Mike Chioda
Referees	John Cone
Referees	Dan Engler
Referees	Darrick Moore
Referees	Chad Patton
Interviewers	Charly Caruso
Interviewers	Dasha Fuentes
Interviewers	Kayla Braxton
Pre-show panel	Jonathan Coachman
Pre-show panel	Beth Phoenix
Pre-show panel	Booker T
Pre-show panel	Sam Roberts

=== Pre-show ===
During the Elimination Chamber Kickoff pre-show, Buddy Murphy defended the WWE Cruiserweight Championship against Akira Tozawa. In the climax, Murphy performed "Murphy's Law" on Tozawa to retain the title.

=== Preliminary matches ===
The actual pay-per-view opened with the women's tag team Elimination Chamber match to determine the inaugural WWE Women's Tag Team Champions. The Boss 'n' Hug Connection (Bayley and Sasha Banks) and Mandy Rose and Sonya Deville started first due to a pre-match stipulation. The Riott Squad (represented by Liv Morgan and Sarah Logan) were the third to enter. The fourth to enter were The IIconics (Billie Kay and Peyton Royce), followed by Naomi and Carmella. The IIconics performed an assisted roll-up on Naomi to eliminate Naomi and Carmella. The last to enter were Nia Jax and Tamina, who performed stereo Samoan drops on Kay and Royce to eliminate The IIconics. Tamina performed a "Superfly Splash" on Logan and Morgan to eliminate The Riott Squad. Jax attempted to perform a spear on Bayley, however, Bayley avoided Jax who crashed through a pod, knocking herself out. Bayley then performed a diving elbow drop on Tamina, and she, Banks, Deville, and Rose collectively pinned Tamina to eliminate Jax and Tamina. Banks and Bayley performed their Backstabber/Bayley-to-Belly combo on Deville, but Rose broke up the pin. Banks and Bayley were about to send Rose off a chamber pod, but Deville made the save and sent Bayley into a steel beam of the pod. Rose then sent Banks shoulder first into the other pod and performed a double underhook facebuster on Banks for a nearfall. As Rose held Banks in position, Banks moved out of the way, causing Deville to spear Rose. Banks then applied the "Bank Statement", but could not fully apply the hold, so Banks used her leg to force Deville to submit, thus The Boss 'n' Hug Connection were crowned the inaugural WWE Women's Tag Team Champions. After the match, both Bayley and Banks cut a promo saying that it was the result of their hard work and determination.

Next, The Miz and Shane McMahon defended the SmackDown Tag Team Championship against The Usos (Jey Uso and Jimmy Uso). In the end, Miz performed a "Skull Crushing Finale" on Jimmy, but as Miz went for the pin, Jimmy countered with a crucifix to win the titles for a record fourth time.

After that, Bobby Lashley defended Raw's Intercontinental Championship in a handicap match in which he teamed with Lio Rush to face Finn Bálor. In the end, Bálor performed a "Coup de Gráce" on Rush to win Lashley's title. After the match, an irate Lashley attacked Rush with a Thrust Spinebuster and walked off.

In the fourth match, Ronda Rousey defended the Raw Women's Championship against Ruby Riott. In the end, Rousey forced Riott to submit to the armbar in 100 seconds. Charlotte Flair, Rousey's WrestleMania 35 opponent who sat at ringside for the match, entered the ring and stared down Rousey until Becky Lynch, Rousey's original WrestleMania opponent who got suspended, emerged from the crowd on crutches. Lynch then attacked Flair with a crutch while Rousey watched. Lynch handed Rousey the other crutch to also attack Flair, but she herself attacked Rousey with a crutch. Security personnel emerged and escorted Lynch out of the building.

In the penultimate match, Braun Strowman faced Baron Corbin in a no disqualification match. Midway through the match, Drew McIntyre came out to assist Corbin, followed by Bobby Lashley. In the climax, Corbin, McIntyre, and Lashley performed a triple powerbomb on Strowman off the steel steps through two tables, allowing Corbin to pin Strowman to win the match.

=== Main event ===
In the main event, Daniel Bryan defended SmackDown's WWE Championship in an Elimination Chamber match against Kofi Kingston, AJ Styles, Jeff Hardy, Randy Orton, and Samoa Joe. Bryan and Joe began the match. Kingston entered third. The fourth entrant was Styles, who eliminated Joe with a "Phenomenal Forearm". Hardy entered fifth but was eliminated by Bryan after a running knee. The last to enter was Orton, who earned that right by winning the gauntlet match on the previous SmackDown. As Styles attempted a "Phenomenal Forearm" on Kingston, Orton caught Styles with an "RKO" to eliminate Styles. Shortly after, Kingston caught Orton with "Trouble in Paradise" to eliminate Orton, leaving Kingston and Bryan as the final two. After several near-falls, Kingston leapt off a chamber pod, but Bryan moved out of the way and eliminated Kingston after a running knee to retain the title. Following the match, a disappointed Kingston was joined by his New Day partners Big E and Xavier Woods as the fans cheered to show their appreciation to Kingston for his performance.

== Aftermath ==
=== Raw ===
The following night on Raw, inaugural WWE Women's Tag Team Champions The Boss 'n' Hug Connection stated that they would be defending the titles across Raw, SmackDown, and NXT. They were then confronted by Nia Jax and Tamina who wanted to be the first challengers. Jax then taunted Banks and stated that whenever Banks wins a title, she loses it in her first defense. The following week, a match pitting Bayley and Banks against Jax and Tamina for the titles was scheduled for Fastlane.

Braun Strowman and Baron Corbin had a rematch in a tables match which Strowman won.

New Intercontinental Champion Finn Bálor addressed his victory. Rush interrupted Bálor and was attacked from behind by previous champion Bobby Lashley. NXT call-up Ricochet came to Bálor's aid and he teamed up with Bálor in his Raw debut match to face Lashley and Rush in which Ricochet pinned Rush to win the match.

Ruby Riott had a rematch with Raw Women's Champion Ronda Rousey. Despite her Riott Squad's (Liv Morgan and Sarah Logan) interference in the match, Riott once again lost.

=== SmackDown ===
On the following episode of SmackDown, a six-man tag team match was scheduled pitting WWE Champion Daniel Bryan, Samoa Joe, and Randy Orton against Kofi Kingston, AJ Styles, and Jeff Hardy. Kingston won the match for his team by pinning Bryan. Afterwards, Kingston was granted a WWE Championship match against Bryan at Fastlane. The following week, however, Vince McMahon replaced Kingston with the returning Kevin Owens.

The Miz apologized to Shane McMahon for costing them the SmackDown Tag Team Championship and begged Shane to schedule a rematch, since Shane had to power to do so. After new champions The Usos insulted Miz, Shane scheduled a rematch for Fastlane.

In a backstage segment, SmackDown Women's Champion Asuka was interrupted by Sonya Deville and Mandy Rose. Rose faced Asuka in a non-title match, which Rose won after she feigned an eye injury. The following week, a match between Asuka and Rose for the title was scheduled for Fastlane.

Charlotte Flair addressed Becky Lynch's attack and boasted about reinjuring Lynch's knee at a house show the night before the pay-per-view. Flair then reiterated Triple H's statement from the night before on Raw, saying that Lynch would be arrested the next time she broke her suspension.

=== 205 Live ===
On the following episode of 205 Live, General Manager Drake Maverick scheduled a tournament to determine WWE Cruiserweight Champion Buddy Murphy's opponent at WrestleMania 35.

The 2019 event would be the only Elimination Chamber to feature the 205 Live brand, as in September, 205 Live merged under NXT.

== Results ==
No.	Results	Stipulations	Times
1^{P}	Buddy Murphy (c) defeated Akira Tozawa by pinfall	Singles match for the WWE Cruiserweight Championship	13:25
2	The Boss 'n' Hug Connection (Bayley and Sasha Banks) defeated Carmella and Naomi, Mandy Rose and Sonya Deville, Nia Jax and Tamina, The IIconics (Billie Kay and Peyton Royce), and The Riott Squad (Liv Morgan and Sarah Logan)	Elimination Chamber match for the inaugural WWE Women's Tag Team Championship	33:00
3	The Usos (Jey Uso and Jimmy Uso) defeated The Miz and Shane McMahon (c) by pinfall	Tag team match for the WWE SmackDown Tag Team Championship	14:10
4	Finn Bálor defeated Bobby Lashley (c) and Lio Rush by pinfall	Handicap match for the WWE Intercontinental Championship	9:30
5	Ronda Rousey (c) defeated Ruby Riott by submission	Singles match for the WWE Raw Women's Championship	1:40
6	Baron Corbin defeated Braun Strowman by pinfall	No Disqualification match	10:50
7	Daniel Bryan (c) defeated AJ Styles, Jeff Hardy, Randy Orton, Samoa Joe, and Kofi Kingston	Elimination Chamber match for the WWE Championship	36:40
(c) / – the champion(s) heading into the match; P / – the match was broadcast on the pre-show

=== Inaugural WWE Women's Tag Team Championship Elimination Chamber match ===
Eliminated	Team	Entered	Eliminated by	Method	Time
1	Carmella and Naomi	5	The IIconics	Pinfall	17:10
2	The IIconics (Peyton Royce and Billie Kay)	4	Tamina	Pinfall	20:15
3	The Riott Squad (Liv Morgan and Sarah Logan)	3	Nia Jax and Tamina	Pinfall	25:05
4	Nia Jax and Tamina	6	The Boss 'n' Hug Connection and Fire and Desire (Bayley and Sasha Banks) and (Mandy Rose and Sonya Deville)	Pinfall	27:05
5	Fire and Desire (Mandy Rose and Sonya Deville)	2	Sasha Banks	Submission	33:00
Winner	The Boss 'n' Hug Connection (Bayley and Sasha Banks)	1			33:00

=== WWE Championship Elimination Chamber match ===
Eliminated	Wrestler	Entered	Eliminated by	Method	Time
1	Samoa Joe	2	AJ Styles	Phenomenal Forearm	14:35
2	Jeff Hardy	5	Daniel Bryan	Running Knee	18:00
3	AJ Styles	4	Randy Orton	RKO	22:25
4	Randy Orton	6	Kofi Kingston	Trouble In Paradise	24:05
5	Kofi Kingston	3	Daniel Bryan	Running Knee	36:40
Winner	Daniel Bryan (c)	1			
