= 2018 WWE Superstar Shake-up =

WWE's intra-brand draft

- The 2018 WWE Superstar Shake-up logo.

General information
- Sport: Professional wrestling
- Date: April 16–17, 2018
- Location: Hartford, Connecticut (April 16); Providence, Rhode Island (April 17)

Overview
- League: WWE
- Teams: Raw; SmackDown; NXT (outgoing only)

The 2018 WWE Superstar Shake-up was the twelfth WWE draft, produced by the American professional wrestling promotion WWE between the Raw and SmackDown brands. Instead of a traditional draft, changes between the brands were made behind the scenes, with moving wrestlers simply appearing on a brand's show or announced via WWE's website or social medias. The two-day event took place on the April 16 and April 17 episodes of Monday Night Raw and SmackDown Live, respectively, on the USA Network in the United States. Raw was broadcast from Hartford, Connecticut at the XL Center, and SmackDown was broadcast from the Dunkin' Donuts Center in Providence, Rhode Island.

== Background ==
The WWE Draft is an annual process used by the American professional wrestling promotion WWE while a brand extension, or brand split, is in effect. The original brand extension occurred from 2002 to 2011, while the second and current brand split began in 2016. During a brand extension, the company divides its roster into brands where the wrestlers exclusively perform for each brand's respective television show, and the draft is used to refresh the rosters of the brand divisions, typically between the Raw and SmackDown brands.

In 2017, WWE rebranded the draft as the Superstar Shake-up to replace the traditional draft the company had done in 2016. On the April 9, 2018 episode of Monday Night Raw, WWE announced another Superstar Shake-up for the April 16 and 17 episodes of Raw and SmackDown, respectively. Instead of a traditional draft, the commissioners and general managers of Raw and SmackDown made trades and other deals behind the scenes between their respective talent, which also included the promotion and drafting of wrestlers from the NXT brand. On April 10, Paige, who had retired from in-ring competition the previous night, was introduced as SmackDown's new general manager. She replaced Daniel Bryan, who returned to being a full-time wrestler.

== Selections ==
=== Raw ===
The following wrestlers and other personnel changed brands on the April 16 episode of Raw.

Color at the top indicates the brand color of Raw as to Night 1 of the draft taking place on Raw separate from Night 2 of the draft taking place on SmackDown separate from the color blue that represents the brand SmackDown.

#	Brand (to)	Employee (Real name)	Role	Brand (from)	Notes
1	Raw	Jinder Mahal and Sunil Singh (Yuvraj Dhesi and Gurvinder Sihra)	Male wrestler and manager	SmackDown	Drafted with the United States Championship.
2	Raw	The Riott Squad (Ruby Riott, Liv Morgan, and Sarah Logan) (Dori Prange, Gionna Daddio, and Sarah Bridges)	Female stable	SmackDown	
3	Raw	Kevin Owens and Sami Zayn (Kevin Steen and Rami Sebei)	Male tag team	Free agents	Owens and Zayn were (kayfabe) fired from SmackDown on March 20, 2018 for assaulting SmackDown Commissioner Shane McMahon, and failed to regain their jobs at WrestleMania 34. They were given a chance to win a single contract in a match against each other on Raw the day after WrestleMania, which ended in a double countout. They were ultimately both signed to Raw contracts as free agents by Raw Commissioner Stephanie McMahon the following week.
4	SmackDown	The Miz (Michael Mizanin)	Male wrestler	Raw	
5	Raw	Zack Ryder (Matthew Cardona)	Male wrestler	SmackDown	Announced his transfer on Twitter
6	Raw	Breezango (Fandango and Tyler Breeze) (Curtis Hussey and Mattias Clement)	Male tag team	SmackDown	
7	Raw	Natalya (Natalie Neidhart-Wilson)	Female wrestler	SmackDown	
8	Raw	Mojo Rawley (Dean Muhtadi)	Male wrestler	SmackDown	Announced on WWE's YouTube channel
9	Raw	Dolph Ziggler (Nicholas Nemeth)	Male wrestler	SmackDown	
10	Raw	Drew McIntyre (Andrew Galloway IV)	Male wrestler	NXT	
11	Raw	Baron Corbin (Thomas Pestock)	Male wrestler	SmackDown	
12	Raw	Mike Kanellis (Michael Bennett)	Male wrestler	SmackDown	Announced on WWE's Twitter
13	Raw	The Ascension (Konnor and Viktor) (Ryan Parmeter and Eric Thompson)	Male tag team	SmackDown	Announced through WWE's Instagram
14	Raw	Bobby Roode (Robert Francis Roode Jr.)	Male wrestler	SmackDown	
15	Raw	Chad Gable (Charles Betts)	Male wrestler	SmackDown	Announced on WWE's Twitter. Separated from his tag team partner Shelton Benjamin.

=== SmackDown ===
The following wrestlers and other personnel changed brands on the April 17 episode of SmackDown.

Color at the top indicates the brand color of SmackDown as to Night 2 of the draft taking place on SmackDown separate from Night 1 of the draft taking place on Raw separate from the color red that represents the brand Raw.

#	Brand (to)	Employee (Real name)	Role	Brand (from)	Notes
1	SmackDown	Jeff Hardy	Male wrestler	Raw	Drafted with the United States Championship, which he won by defeating previous champion Jinder Mahal on the previous night's Raw. Separated from his brother and Hardy Boyz tag team partner, Matt Hardy.
2	SmackDown	Absolution (Mandy Rose and Sonya Deville) (Amanda Saccomanno and Daria Berenato)	Female tag team	Raw	
3	SmackDown	Samoa Joe (Nuufolau Seanoa)	Male wrestler	Raw	
4	SmackDown	Sanity (Eric Young, Alexander Wolfe, and Killian Dain) (Jeremy Fritz, Axel Tischer, and Damien Mackle)	Male stable	NXT	Nikki Cross was also a member of the stable in NXT, but was not called up.
5	SmackDown	Big Cass (William Morrissey)	Male wrestler	Raw	The Superstar Shake-up was his first appearance on WWE television since his injury in August 2017.
6	SmackDown	Asuka (Kanako Urai)	Female wrestler	Raw	Asuka had challenged Charlotte Flair for the SmackDown Women's Championship after winning the 2018 Women's Royal Rumble, and had been appearing on both shows in the weeks prior to WrestleMania 34.
7	SmackDown	Luke Gallows and Karl Anderson (Andrew Hankinson and Chad Allegra)	Male tag team	Raw	
8	SmackDown	Cesaro and Sheamus (Claudio Castagnoli and Stephen Farrelly)	Male tag team	Raw	Cesaro and Sheamus challenged for the Raw Tag Team Championship at Greatest Royal Rumble two weeks later, which they lost.
9	SmackDown	R-Truth (Ronnie Killings)	Male wrestler	Raw	
10	SmackDown	Andrade "Cien" Almas and Zelina Vega (Manuel Andrade and Thea Trinidad)	Male wrestler and female manager	NXT	

Notes

- Two tag teams were split up as a result of the Superstar Shake-up. In September 2017, Jeff Hardy took time off due to an injury. He returned the week prior to the Superstar Shake-up, but was then moved to SmackDown while Matt Hardy remained on Raw, splitting up The Hardy Boyz. The team of Chad Gable and Shelton Benjamin was split as Gable moved to Raw while Benjamin remained on SmackDown.
- The United States Championship moved from SmackDown to Raw and then back to SmackDown. Reigning champion Jinder Mahal moved to Raw on the April 16 episode of Raw and lost the title to Jeff Hardy who moved to SmackDown the following night on SmackDown.

== Aftermath ==
On Raw, after being drafted with the United States Championship, Jinder Mahal immediately lost the title to Jeff Hardy and failed to win it back at the Greatest Royal Rumble. He then had a short feud with Roman Reigns as well as a storyline with Kevin Owens and Braun Strowman. The Riott Squad (Ruby Riott, Liv Morgan, and Sarah Logan) made their debut by attacking Bayley and Sasha Banks. Over the following year, they feuded with the likes of The Bella Twins (Brie Bella and Nikki Bella) and Ronda Rousey, with each member unsuccessfully facing Rousey for the Raw Women's Championship, and Morgan and Logan also challenged for the inaugural WWE Women's Tag Team Championship. Kevin Owens and Sami Zayn lost their initial match on Raw and had a short feud with Braun Strowman and the returning Bobby Lashley. Later in the year, both suffered injuries, requiring them to take time off, subsequently disbanding their team. Both returned in early 2019, but with Owens on SmackDown while Zayn remained on Raw. Shortly after the Superstar Shake-up, Zack Ryder injured his knee, taking him out of action for several weeks. After his return, he reignited his feud with Mojo Rawley. After moving to Raw, Natalya became a fan favorite and had a storyline with Ronda Rousey and a short feud with Ruby Riott. Dolph Ziggler and Drew McIntyre formed a tag team and feuded with Seth Rollins. Ziggler went on to win the Intercontinental Championship, and the two also won the Raw Tag Team Championship before McIntyre turned on Ziggler. In mid-2018, Baron Corbin was made the Constable of Raw by the brand's commissioner Stephanie McMahon and eventually became the Acting Raw General Manager after Kurt Angle was forced to go on vacation by Stephanie. He also feuded with Braun Strowman in the later half of the year. Although he was moved to Raw, Mike Kanellis primarily appeared on Main Event and was eventually moved to the 205 Live brand along with his wife Maria Kanellis. Bobby Roode and Chad Gable eventually formed a tag team and later won the Raw Tag Team Championship.

After moving to SmackDown, bringing the United States Championship back to the brand, Jeff Hardy feuded with Randy Orton and Shinsuke Nakamura, dropping the title to the latter. Before moving to SmackDown, The Miz lost the Intercontinental Championship to Seth Rollins at WrestleMania 34. He had two rematches to regain the title, at Greatest Royal Rumble and Backlash, but failed in both attempts, and later in the year, reignited his feud with Daniel Bryan. After former Absolution leader and new SmackDown General Manager Paige made it clear that she would not show them special treatment, Mandy Rose and Sonya Deville dropped the name Absolution but remained a tag team. Although tensions rose between the two, they challenged for the inaugural WWE Women's Tag Team Championship. Despite moving to SmackDown, Samoa Joe had an opportunity at the Intercontinental Championship at the Greatest Royal Rumble, but lost. He also faced Raw's Roman Reigns at Backlash, but also lost that match. He then entered into a feud with AJ Styles over the WWE Championship, and although unsuccessful at gaining that title, he won the United States Championship before the year's end. Big Cass immediately began a feud with Daniel Bryan that he ultimately lost before being released from his WWE contract in June. Asuka began a feud with Carmella over the SmackDown Women's Championship that she ultimately lost, however, she eventually won the title before the year's end. Luke Gallows and Karl Anderson earned an opportunity for the SmackDown Tag Team Championship at Money in the Bank, but failed. Before moving to SmackDown, Cesaro and Sheamus were granted an opportunity at the Raw Tag Team Championship at the Greatest Royal Rumble, but failed to win the titles. They then officially changed their team name to The Bar, previously a nickname, and began a pursuit for the SmackDown Tag Team Championship, which they eventually won. R-Truth eventually formed a partnership with Carmella and the two would go on to win Mixed Match Challenge Season 2. After moving to SmackDown, Andrade began a feud with Sin Cara. The Hardy Boyz eventually reunited; in mid-2018, Matt Hardy went on hiatus, but when he returned in February 2019, he returned on the SmackDown brand and reunited with Jeff. Nikki Cross was eventually called up in December 2018, but did not rejoin Sanity and appeared on both Raw and SmackDown.
