= Mandy Rose =

American professional wrestler (born 1990)

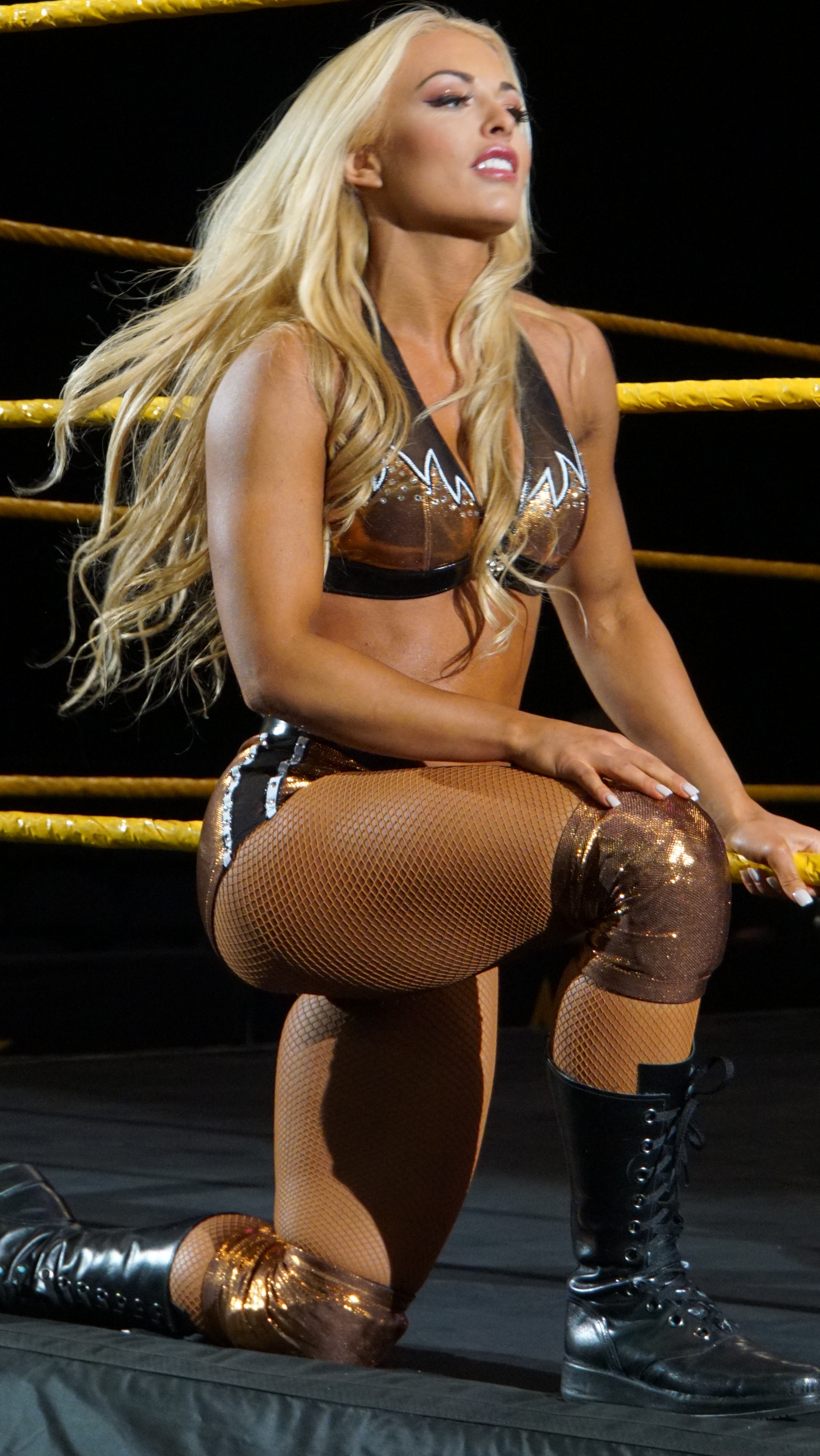
- Rose on April 1, 2016

Personal information
- Born: Amanda Rose Saccomanno; July 18, 1990 (age 36) Westchester County, New York, U.S.
- Spouse: Tino Sabbatelli (m. 2024)
- Children: 1

Professional wrestling career
- Ring name: Mandy Rose
- Billed height: 5 ft 4 in (163 cm)
- Billed weight: 120 lb (54 kg)
- Billed from: Yorktown Heights, New York
- Trained by: Booker T Billy Gunn; Lita; WWE Performance Center
- Debut: August 25, 2015

Amanda Rose Saccomanno (born July 18, 1990) is an American professional wrestler, television personality, and fitness and figure competitor. She is best known for her tenure in WWE from 2015 to 2022, where she performed under the ring name Mandy Rose, and was a former NXT Women's Champion and was the leader of the Toxic Attraction stable alongside Jacy Jayne and Gigi Dolin. Rose was also previously a member of the Fire and Desire tag team duo alongside Sonya Deville.

Rose began a professional fitness competition career in 2013 and became a bodybuilding competitor the following year. In 2015, she placed second on the WWE competition Tough Enough, after which she signed a contract with WWE and joined the cast of the reality television show Total Divas. After a brief stint in WWE's developmental territory, NXT, Rose made her main roster debut in November 2017 as part of the short-lived faction Absolution with Paige and Sonya Deville. For approximately three years, Rose competed alongside Deville and they were known as Fire and Desire. The two disbanded in March 2020 at WrestleMania 36 and eventually had their own feud that culminated in a Loser Leaves WWE match, which Rose won. After a brief association with Dana Brooke in 2021, she returned to NXT and formed an alliance with Gigi Dolin and Jacy Jayne, dubbed Toxic Attraction. In October at Halloween Havoc, Rose defeated Raquel González to win her first title in her career, the NXT Women's Championship. She was released from the company in December 2022.

== Early life ==
Amanda Rose Saccomanno was born in the New York City suburb of Westchester County, New York. She was the youngest, and only female, of four children. Her older brother, Richard, died on October 3, 2022, after several years battling against depression. She has Irish and Italian ancestry. Her childhood nickname was "Hamburgers". She attended Yorktown High School, where she participated in dance. She later earned her bachelor's degree at Iona College, majoring in speech pathology. She entered her first fitness competition in 2013, and took first place in the World Bodybuilding Fitness & Fashion Boston Show. She was also crowned the 2014 World Beauty Fitness & Fashion Bikini Champion.

== Professional wrestling career ==
=== WWE (2015–2022) ===
==== Tough Enough and NXT (2015–2017) ====
Saccomanno was a contestant in the sixth season of the WWE competition WWE Tough Enough, which began airing in June 2015. She was at risk of elimination on the July 28 episode, but was saved by judge The Miz. During the season finale, she adopted the ring name Mandy Rose, lost a match against Alicia Fox, and placed second overall, after winners Sara Lee and Josh Bredl.

After the Tough Enough season finale, it was revealed that Rose had signed a five-year contract with the company. Rose made her in-ring debut for WWE's developmental territory, NXT, during a six-woman tag team match at a live event in Venice, Florida on January 30, 2016. On the August 17 episode of NXT, Rose debuted in a six-woman tag team match along with Daria Berenato and Alexa Bliss, in which they were defeated by Carmella, Liv Morgan, and Nikki Glencross. On the September 28 episode of NXT, Rose lost her first televised singles match to Ember Moon.

==== Fire and Desire (2017–2021) ====
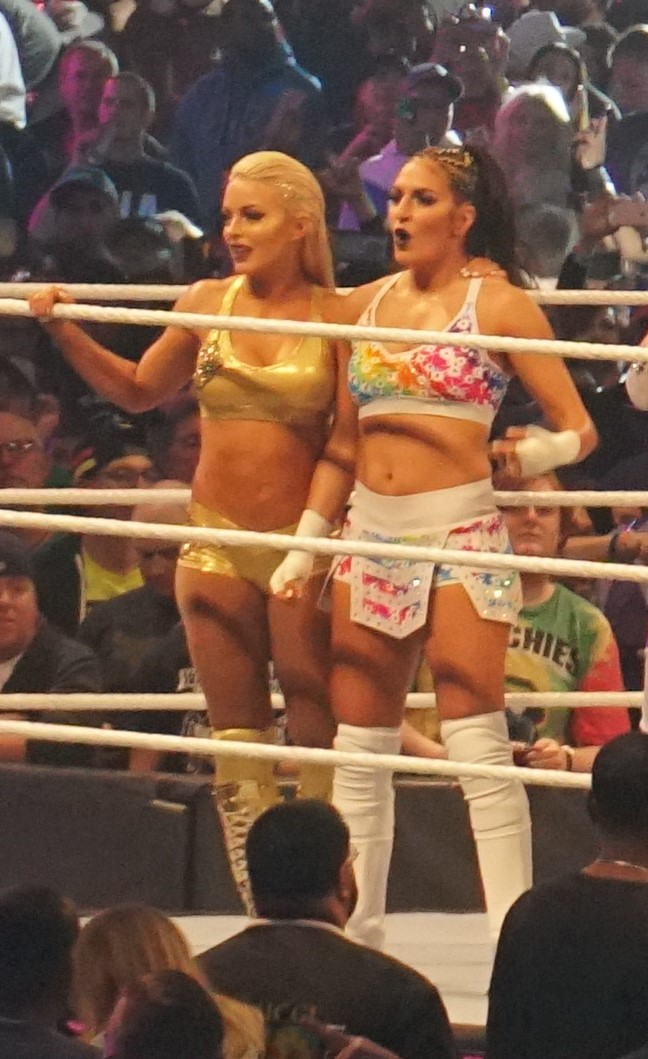
Rose (left) with Sonya Deville at WrestleMania 34 in April 2018

On the November 20, 2017, episode of Raw, Rose joined Sonya Deville and Paige as they attacked Sasha Banks, Bayley, Mickie James, and Alexa Bliss. A week later, the trio's name was revealed as Absolution. On January 28, 2018, at the Royal Rumble, Rose entered the first women's Royal Rumble match at number 4, and she was the first woman eliminated from the match by Lita. In February, Rose took part of the inaugural women's Elimination Chamber match, which was won by Bliss. At WrestleMania 34, Rose participated in the WrestleMania Women's Battle Royal, which would be won by Naomi.

Both Rose and Deville were drafted to SmackDown during the 2018 WWE Superstar Shake-up, with Paige, who had retired and become the SmackDown general manager, subsequently declaring that Absolution was over. Rose then continued competing in various tag team matches alongside Deville. In October, Rose eliminated Deville before she herself was eliminated by Carmella in a battle royal at the inaugural all women's pay-per-view, Evolution. At Survivor Series in November, Rose competed in her first traditional five-on-five elimination match as part of Team SmackDown in a losing effort. Rose later feuded with Naomi after she flirted with Naomi's husband, Jimmy Uso, to "ruin Naomi's life", which involved Rose hinting at kissing Uso as well as Naomi attacking Rose in a hotel room to which Rose invited Uso. The rivalry continued with Rose and Naomi eliminating each other from the women's Royal Rumble match at the namesake event in January 2019, where Rose managed to last 25:50. The two exchanged victories over each other in February.

At Elimination Chamber in February 2019, Rose and Deville competed in a six-team Elimination Chamber match for the inaugural WWE Women's Tag Team Championship, starting the match and becoming the final team eliminated by Sasha Banks and Bayley, who won the match in the process. Rose participated in the second WrestleMania Women's Battle Royal during the WrestleMania 35 pre-show in a losing effort. She competed in the Money in the Bank ladder match at the namesake pay-per-view on May 19. Deville, who was ringside, unsuccessfully tried to climb the ladder and help Rose in the match, which was won by Bayley. On the September 3 episode of SmackDown, Rose and Deville, now dubbed Fire & Desire, earned a match at Clash of Champions for the Women's Tag Team Championship by defeating Alexa Bliss and Nikki Cross. At the event, the two failed to capture the title.

In December 2019, Rose entered a romance storyline with Otis, with Otis helping Rose during her matches. She later agreed to a date with him on Valentine's Day, but Dolph Ziggler appeared in Otis's place during the date, which resulted in a romance between Rose and Ziggler. The storyline then evolved into a love triangle involving a feud between Otis and Ziggler over Rose. It was revealed on SmackDown in April that Deville was working with Ziggler to keep Otis from Rose. At WrestleMania 36, Rose interfered during a match between Otis and Ziggler by attacking Deville, who was at ringside, and Ziggler, which helped Otis score the victory. Following the match, she and Otis shared a kiss. On the May 22 episode of SmackDown, she and Otis lost to Deville and Ziggler in a tag team match. On July 31, Rose's hair was cut by Deville during a backstage attack, which led to Rose debuting a new look with shorter hair the following week. That same month, she defeated Deville in a Loser Leaves WWE match at SummerSlam.

In September, Rose was traded to the Raw brand. She subsequently formed a tag team with Dana Brooke. In April 2021, the two competed in a tag team turmoil match during the first night of WrestleMania 37, where they were eliminated by the Riott Squad (Liv Morgan and Ruby Riott).

==== Toxic Attraction (2021–2022) ====
In July 2021, Rose returned to the NXT brand and the following month, she formed an alliance with Gigi Dolin and Jacy Jayne, dubbed Toxic Attraction. She subsequently abandoned her blonde hair and dyed it brown. At Halloween Havoc in October, Rose defeated Raquel González in a Chucky's choice Trick or Street Fight match to win the NXT Women's Championship, the first title in her wrestling career. Earlier that same night, Dolin and Jayne won the NXT Women's Tag Team Championship, in turn having Toxic Attraction holding all women's championships in NXT. On December 5, at WarGames, Rose and Toxic Attraction teamed with Dakota Kai. They were defeated by the team of Cora Jade, Io Shirai, Kay Lee Ray, and González in a WarGames match.

In January 2022, At New Year's Evil, Rose defeated Jade and González in a triple threat match to retain the title. At Stand & Deliver, Rose defended her championship against Jade, Ray, and Shirai in a fatal four-way match. Throughout her championship reign, Rose went on to fend off title contenders such as Roxanne Perez, Wendy Choo and Zoey Stark. At Worlds Collide, Rose unified the NXT UK Women's Championship with the NXT Women's Championship by defeating NXT UK champion Meiko Satomura and Blair Davenport in a triple threat match.

At Halloween Havoc, Rose retained her title against Alba Fyre. On October 26, Rose reached the 365-day mark as champion, becoming only the third woman to hold the title for a continuous reign of one full year. On the December 13 episode of NXT, Rose lost the NXT Women's Championship to Perez in a rematch, ending her reign at 413 days. The next day, Rose was released from her WWE contract due to her FanTime content. On January 10, 2023, she addressed her release in an episode of The Tamron Hall Show.

== Other media ==
Mandy Sacs

YouTube information
- Channel: Mandy Sacs
- Years active: 2013–present
- Genre: Podcasting
- Subscribers: 85.2 thousand
- Views: 4.9 million
- Last updated: November 10, 2026

Saccomanno has been featured in multiple fitness publications including Fitness Gurls, Fit & Firm, and FitFemme.

Saccomanno appeared as part of the main cast for the fifth season of the WWE reality television series Total Divas, which began airing in January 2016.

== Business ventures ==
Saccomanno is an owner of her own beauty and skincare line named Amarose, a combination of her first and middle names.

On July 28, 2022, Saccomanno alongside fellow wrestler Daria Berenato, best known as Sonya Deville, opened their own virtual donut brand named DaMandyz Donutz, delivered by Uber Eats in Los Angeles.

== Personal life ==
Saccomanno participates in yoga, pilates, and CrossFit. In April 2018, she revealed that she was dating fellow professional wrestler Sabatino Piscitelli, better known by the ring name Tino Sabbatelli. They got engaged in September 2022 and got married on November 2, 2024. On July 6, 2026, Saccomanno announced that she is expecting her first child. Saccomanno gave birth to their son on July 31.

== Filmography ==
=== Television ===
Year	Title	Role	Notes
2015	WWE Tough Enough	Herself	Contestant; runner-up (season 6)
2015	WWE Breaking Ground	Herself	1 episode, uncredited
2016, 2018–19	Total Divas	Herself	Main cast (season 5): 10 episodes Guest (seasons 8–9)
2018	Celtic Warrior Workouts	Herself	episode 16
2018–2020	Ride Along	Herself	3 episodes
2018	My Son/Daughter is a WWE Superstar	Herself	Episode: “Mandy Rose”
2019	Table for 3	Herself	1 episode
2023	Tamron Hall	Herself	—N/a

=== Video games ===
Year	Title	Notes	Ref.
2018	WWE 2K19	Video game debut	
2019	WWE 2K20	—N/a	
2020	WWE 2K Battlegrounds	—N/a	
2022	WWE 2K22	—N/a	

== Championships and accomplishments ==
=== Fitness and figure competition ===
- World Bodybuilding Fitness & Fashion
  - 2013 WBFF Boston – (first place)
  - 2014 WBFF Diva Bikini Pro World Championship – (first place)

=== Professional wrestling ===
- Pro Wrestling Illustrated
  - Most Improved Wrestler of the Year (2022)
  - Ranked No. 21 of the top 150 female singles wrestlers in the PWI Women's 150 in 2022
- Slam Wrestling Awards
  - Best NXT Female (2022)
- Women's Wrestling Fan Awards
  - Best Heel of the Year (2022)
- WWE
  - NXT Women's Championship (1 time)
  - Runner-up WWE Tough Enough (Season 6)
