= Sonya Deville =

American professional wrestler and mixed martial artist

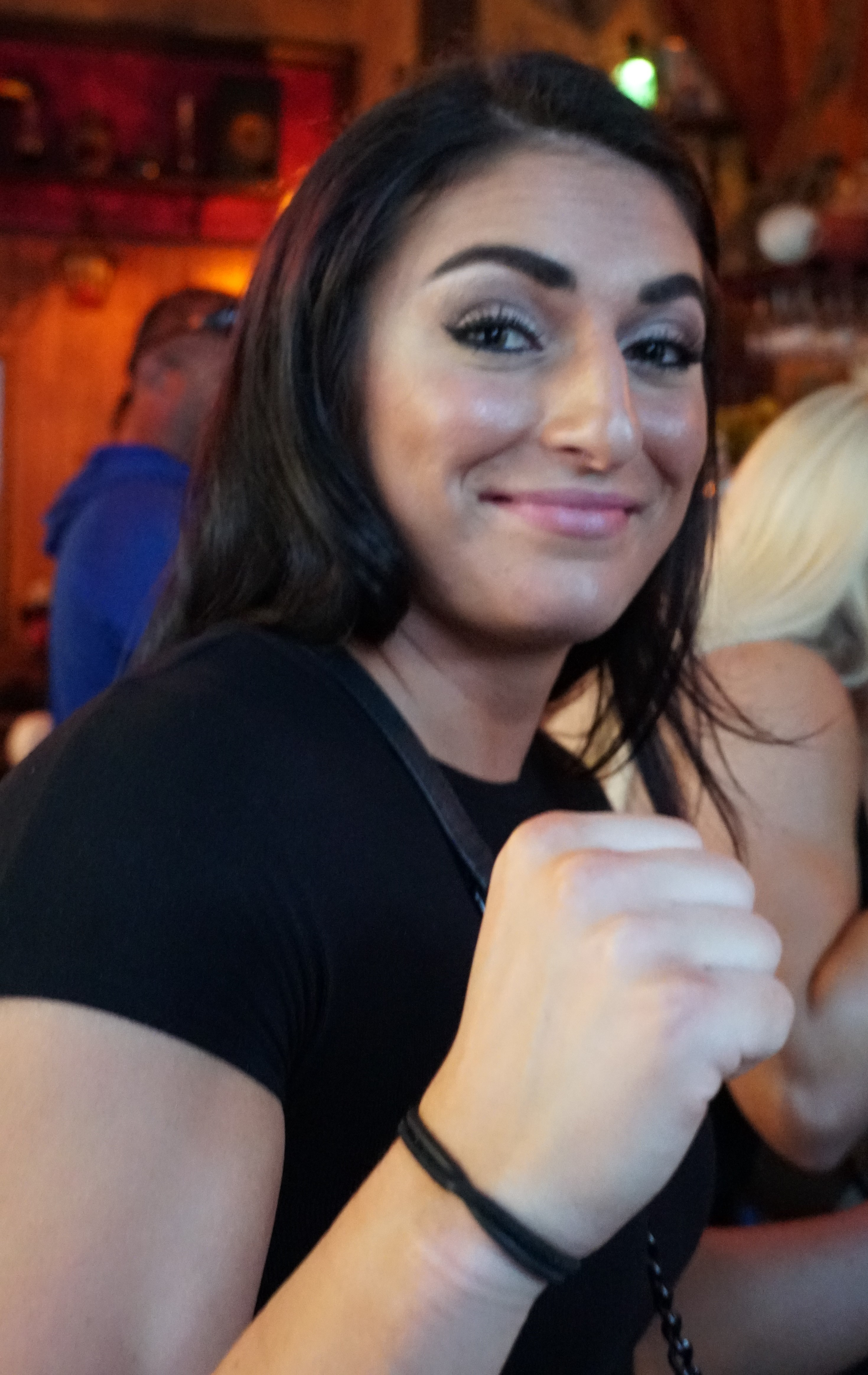
- Deville in 2018

Personal information
- Born: Daria Rae Berenato; September 24, 1993 (age 33) Shamong Township, New Jersey, U.S.
- Spouse: Toni Cassano (m. 2024)

Professional wrestling career
- Ring name(s): Daria Berenato; Daria Rae; Sonya Deville
- Billed height: 5 ft 7 in (170 cm)
- Billed weight: 130 lb (59 kg)
- Billed from: Los Angeles, California; Shamong, New Jersey
- Trained by: Brian Kendrick; Booker T Billy Gunn; Lita; WWE Performance Center
- Debut: December 3, 2015
- Retired: July 24, 2025

Daria Rae Berenato (born September 24, 1993) is an American former professional wrestler and mixed martial artist. She is signed to Total Nonstop Action Wrestling (TNA), where she performs under the ring name Daria Rae and is the on-screen Director of Operations. She is best known for her ten-year tenure with WWE, where she performed under the ring name Sonya Deville (/ˈsoʊnjə/ SOHN-yə) is a former one-time WWE Women's Tag Team Champion.

Berenato rose to prominence as a contestant in the 2015 season of WWE Tough Enough, where she finished 11th place. Following her elimination, she signed a contract with WWE and was sent to the WWE Performance Center in Orlando, Florida. She then performed in WWE's developmental brand, NXT, before moving up to the main roster as Sonya Deville in November 2017, she was assigned to the Raw brand in a stable with Mandy Rose and Paige called Absolution. Deville and Rose were later drafted to SmackDown and became Fire and Desire before eventually splitting. After taking time off in mid-2020, she returned in January 2021 in a non-wrestling role as an on-screen authority figure alongside Adam Pearce, but resumed wrestling in mid-2022. She departed from WWE in February 2025 and retired from in-ring competition. She debuted in TNA in January 2026 as an on-screen screen authority figure.

In mixed martial arts, she has competed in three fights, holding a record of two wins and one loss.

== Early life ==
Daria Rae Berenato was born on September 24, 1993, in Shamong Township, New Jersey, to Italian parents. She attended Seneca High School in Tabernacle, New Jersey. At the age of 16, Berenato began training and competing in mixed martial arts.

== Professional wrestling career ==
=== WWE (2015–2025) ===
==== Tough Enough and NXT (2015–2017) ====
In June 2015, Berenato was one of the thirteen finalists for the WWE Tough Enough season 6. She was the third competitor eliminated from the competition.

In October 2015, Berenato signed a contract with WWE, and was assigned to their developmental brand NXT to begin her training. She made her in-ring debut on December 3 during a live event against Nia Jax, which she lost. Berenato made her first televised appearance and in-ring debut under her real name on the August 17 episode of NXT, where she competed in a six-woman tag team match along with Mandy Rose, and Alexa Bliss, in which they were defeated by Carmella, Liv Morgan, and Nikki Cross. Berenato returned to television on the November 23 episode of NXT in another six-woman tag team match with The Iconic Duo (Billie Kay and Peyton Royce), where they lost to Aliyah, Ember Moon and Liv Morgan. On the December 21 episode of NXT, Berenato competed in her first televised singles match, where she was defeated by Billie Kay due to a distraction by Peyton Royce.

Berenato returned on the May 3, 2017, episode of NXT under the new ring name Sonya Deville, participating in a number one contender's battle royal for Asuka's NXT Women's Championship, where she was eliminated by Peyton Royce and Billie Kay. Following this, Deville began a winning streak, defeating Lacey Evans, Rachel Evers, Jenna Van Bemel, and Zeda. Following another short hiatus, Deville returned on the October 18 episode of NXT, where she participated in a triple threat match against Ember Moon and Ruby Riott to gain a spot on the fatal four-way match for the vacant NXT Women's Championship at TakeOver: WarGames on November 18, which was won by Moon. On the November 22 episode of NXT, Deville was defeated by Ruby Riott. A rematch took place on the December 6 episode of NXT, where they faced off in a no holds barred match which Deville won. Deville then unsuccessfully challenged Ember Moon for the title on the December 27 episode of NXT.

==== Fire and Desire (2017–2020) ====
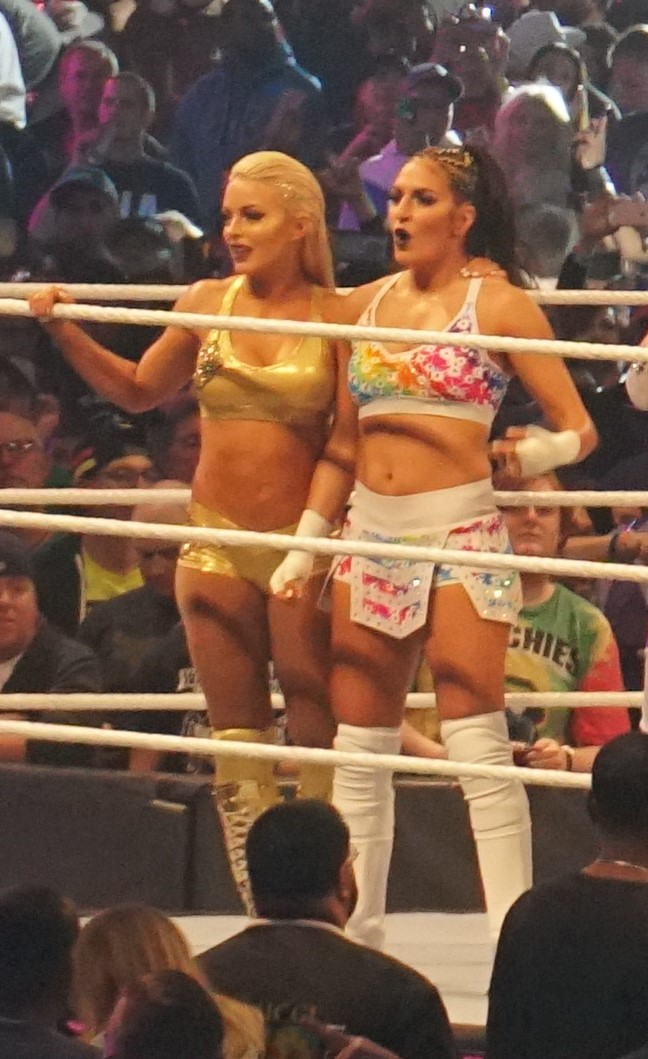
Deville (right) with Mandy Rose at WrestleMania 34 in April 2018

On the November 20, 2017, episode of Raw, Deville joined Mandy Rose and Paige as they attacked Sasha Banks, Bayley, Mickie James, and Alexa Bliss. A week later, the trio's name was revealed as Absolution. Deville had her first televised match on the main roster at Tribute to the Troops on December 19, where Absolution defeated Bayley, Mickie James and Sasha Banks.

On January 28, 2018, at the Royal Rumble, Deville entered the first women's Royal Rumble match at number 10, and she eliminated Torrie Wilson, lasting 6:41 before being eliminated by Michelle McCool. She was also in the first women's Elimination Chamber match on February 25 at Elimination Chamber, where she was defeated by Bliss. In April, Paige retired from the ring due to neck injuries and became the SmackDown general manager. In her first WrestleMania appearance, at WrestleMania 34, Deville participated in the WrestleMania Women's Battle Royal, which would be won by Naomi.

During the 2018 Superstar Shake-up, both Deville and Rose were drafted to SmackDown, but Paige declared they would not receive special treatment and that Absolution is over. Throughout the summer, Deville would continue her alliance with Rose as the two remained a tag team and competed in various singles and tag team matches. On October 28, Deville also took part of the first ever all women's pay-per-view, Evolution, competing in a battle royal match where she was eliminated by Rose. In November, it was announced that Deville will take part of Team Smackdown for the upcoming traditional five-on-five elimination match at Survivor Series. In her first appearance at the event, Deville was one of the final two women of the team alongside Asuka, but she was eliminated via count out after a brawl with Bayley outside the ring. On January 27, 2019, at the Royal Rumble, Deville competed in her second Royal Rumble match, where she entered at number 25, lasting 04:26, before she was eliminated by Alexa Bliss. On February 17, Deville and Rose competed in a six-team Elimination Chamber match for the inaugural WWE Women's Tag Team Championship at the namesake pay-per-view, where they were the last team eliminated by the eventual winners Sasha Banks and Bayley.

Shortly after Fastlane, the dissolution angle between Deville and Rose was once again portrayed as both accidentally cost each other matches against SmackDown Women's Champion Asuka. Both Deville and Rose competed in the second WrestleMania Women's Battle Royal during the WrestleMania 35 pre-show, however, they were one of the last competitors eliminated from the match. In May, Deville and Rose were given the opportunity to choose between each other who would be the last competitor for the Money in the Bank ladder match at the namesake pay-per-view on May 19. Deville, who insisted on Rose getting the spot, tried to climb the ladder and help Rose win the match, however, Bayley was able to fight them off and retrieve the briefcase.

After Rose entered a storyline love triangle with Otis and Dolph Ziggler in 2020, it was revealed on the April 3 episode of SmackDown that Deville was working with Ziggler to keep Otis from Rose. Deville then accompanied Ziggler to his match against Otis at WrestleMania 36 on April 5, during which she was attacked by Rose, who aligned herself with Otis. Later that month, Deville called Rose out to brand her selfish, vow to "ruin Rose's life", and attack her. On the May 22 episode of SmackDown, Deville and Ziggler defeated Otis and Rose in a tag team match. In July, Deville attacked Rose backstage and proceeded to cut her hair. The two were originally scheduled to compete in a hair vs. hair match at SummerSlam, but due to Deville's obligation to appear in court following the attempted kidnapping at her home, her lawyer advised her against cutting her hair short; therefore, the stipulation was changed to a No Disqualification Loser Leaves WWE match. Deville lost the match to Rose at the event in August. She began a hiatus after the defeat.

==== Final storylines and retirement (2021–2025) ====
On the January 1, 2021, episode of SmackDown, Deville returned to WWE in her first appearance since August 2020, and was announced as having been reinstated. She then became the assistant to on-screen authority figure Adam Pearce on the SmackDown brand. She later also began to appear on the Raw brand and making executive decisions herself, such as reinstating Charlotte Flair after Pearce had suspended Flair, and then adding her to the Raw Women's Championship match at WrestleMania Backlash. In August 2021, Deville became involved in a feud with Naomi, which developed due to Deville's irritation with Naomi's persistence in asking her to put her in matches.

On the April 11 episode of Raw, after new Raw Women's Champion Bianca Belair had defeated Queen Zelina in a non-title match, Deville emerged and disclosed plans to name Belair's next challenger for the title. As Belair had her back turned on Deville, Deville blindsided and attacked her, revealing herself to be the mystery challenger before signing the match contract. On April 18, Deville and Belair came face-to-face, during which Belair was almost goaded into attacking Deville. Later, Deville revealed that Belair had to be fined because she laid her hands on an official. Adam Pearce fined Belair $1 and when Deville complained about this, Pearce informed Deville that there was an investigation going on concerning her conduct. On the May 9 episode of Raw, Deville was no longer a WWE official and returned as an in-ring competitor in a match she lost to the returning Alexa Bliss. Deville made a surprise appearance on the October 11 episode of NXT, where she attacked Alba Fyre from the crowd, as she aligned herself with Toxic Attraction (Gigi Dolin and Jacy Jayne) by powerbombing Fyre through the commentary table. Deville then competed at Royal Rumble on January 28, 2023, where she entered at number 27 and got 3 eliminations before being eliminated by Asuka.

On the March 27, 2023, episode of Raw, Deville teamed up with Chelsea Green and defeated the team of Candice LeRae and "Michin" Mia Yim to qualify for the Women's WrestleMania Showcase match. At Night 2 of WrestleMania 39, Green and Deville were unsuccessful, with the match being won by Ronda Rousey and Shayna Baszler. Deville and Green were drafted to the Raw brand as part of the 2023 WWE Draft. On the July 3 episode of Raw, Deville and Green won a tag team turmoil match to earn an opportunity at the WWE Women's Tag Team Championship, which they would subsequently win from Liv Morgan and Raquel Rodriguez two weeks later, marking the first championship win in Deville's career. On August 7, TMZ reported that Deville had suffered a torn ACL and that she would be out indefinitely. Deville confirmed the injury through her social media channels. On the August 14 episode of Raw, a returning Piper Niven declared herself as one-half of the WWE Women's Tag Team Champions and replacing Deville as Green's new tag team partner. WWE recognize this date as the end date of Deville's reign, ending her reign at 28 days.

Deville made her return from injury on the May 20, 2024, episode of Raw, where she appeared in a backstage segment with Shayna Baszler and Zoey Stark. On the July 8 episode of Raw, Baszler and Stark aligned themselves with Deville after weeks of declining the latter's offer, later calling themselves the "Pure Fusion Collective". On the February 3 episode of Main Event, Deville was defeated by Natalya in what would be her final match in WWE. On February 7, it was reported that WWE would not be renewing Deville's contract.

In a July 2025 interview with Chris Van Vliet, Berenato announced her retirement from professional wrestling but did not rule out a possible return in the future.

=== Total Nonstop Action Wrestling (2026–present) ===
Berenato, under the name Daria Rae, made her Total Nonstop Action Wrestling (TNA) debut on January 15, 2026, on Thursday Night Impact!'s AMC debut, where she was introduced under the character of the Director of Operations by Santino Marella and introduced Elayna Black as the new member of the roster.

== Other media ==
Berenato will star in the upcoming action film Paper Made.

Berenato co-hosted the YouTube series UFC AfterBuzz. She appeared as a main cast member for the ninth season of Total Divas.

She made her WWE video game debut as a playable character in WWE 2K19. She also appeared in WWE 2K20, WWE 2K Battlegrounds, WWE 2K22, WWE 2K23, WWE 2K24 and WWE 2K25. On May 16, Berenato joined the commentary team as part of Invicta Fighting Championships's Invicta FC 62 event.

== Business ventures ==
On July 28, 2022, Berenato alongside fellow wrestler Amanda Saccomanno, best known as Mandy Rose, opened their own virtual donut brand named DaMandyz Donutz, delivered by Uber Eats in Los Angeles.

== Personal life ==
Berenato is gay, making her the first openly gay female wrestler in WWE. She came out during an episode of Tough Enough. She is in a relationship with model and fitness enthusiast Toni Cassano. Berenato and Cassano became engaged in February 2023 and then married in February 2024.

On August 16, 2020, a South Carolina man named Phillip Thomas was arrested and charged with aggravated stalking, armed burglary of a dwelling, attempted armed kidnapping, and criminal mischief for breaking into Berenato's home in Lutz, Florida. Berenato was subsequently granted a temporary injunction against "stalking violence". In 2023, Thomas was sentenced to 15 years in prison.

Berenato was arrested in Atlantic City, New Jersey in February 2023 for possessing a firearm without a permit. She was released on a summons for a future court date. The charge was resolved in December after she completed a six-month pretrial intervention program.

== Mixed martial arts record ==
Daria Rae Berenato
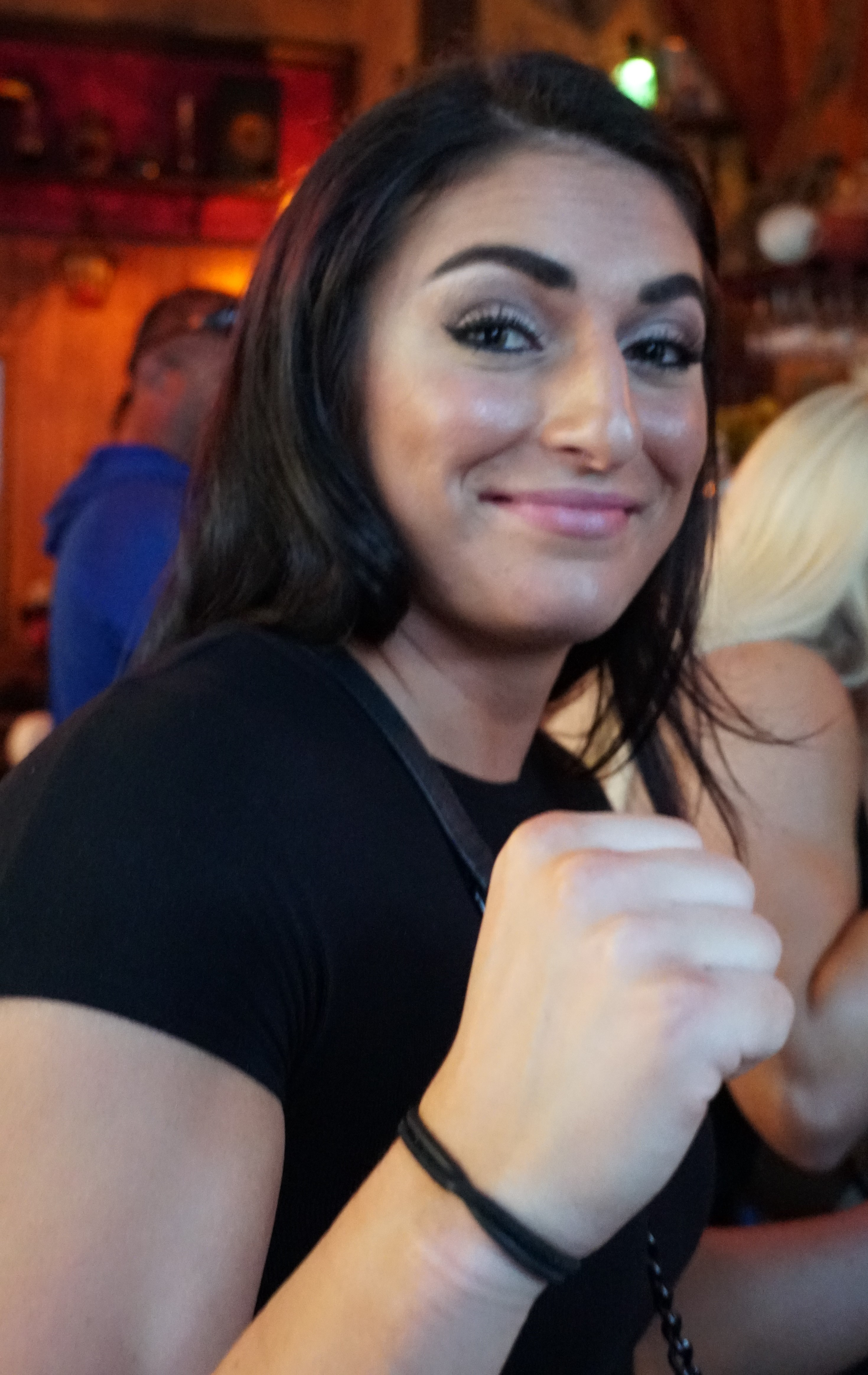
- Born: Shamong Township, New Jersey, U.S.
- Nationality: American
- Height: 5 ft 7 in (1.70 m)
- Weight: 125 lb (57 kg)
- Division: Flyweight
- Years active: 2014–2015

Mixed martial arts record
- Total: 3
- Wins: 2
- By knockout: 1
- By submission: 1
- Losses: 1
- By decision: 1

Other information
- Mixed martial arts record from Sherdog

Professional record breakdown
3 matches	2 wins	1 loss
By knockout	1	0
By submission	1	0
By decision	0	1

Res.	Record	Opponent	Method	Event	Date	Round	Time	Location	Notes
Loss	2–1	Jasmine Pouncy	Decision (unanimous)	University of MMA: Fight Night 9	March 8, 2015	3	6:00	Los Angeles, California, United States	
Win	2–0	Jeselia Perez	TKO (punches)	CFL HD 2: Bitter Rivals	February 7, 2015	2	2:00	Victorville, California, United States	
Win	1–0	Allenita Perez	Submission (guillotine choke)	CFL HD 1: Mavericks, No Guts No Glory	October 11, 2014	3	1:09	Adelanto, California, United States	

== Championships and accomplishments ==
- Pro Wrestling Illustrated
  - Ranked No. 56 of the top 100 female wrestlers in the PWI Women's 100 in 2020
- WWE
  - WWE Women's Tag Team Championship (1 time) – with Chelsea Green
  - Bumpy Awards (1 time)
    - Best Dressed of the Half-Year (2021) – with Seth Rollins
