= Mandy Rose and Sonya Deville =

Professional wrestling tag team and stable

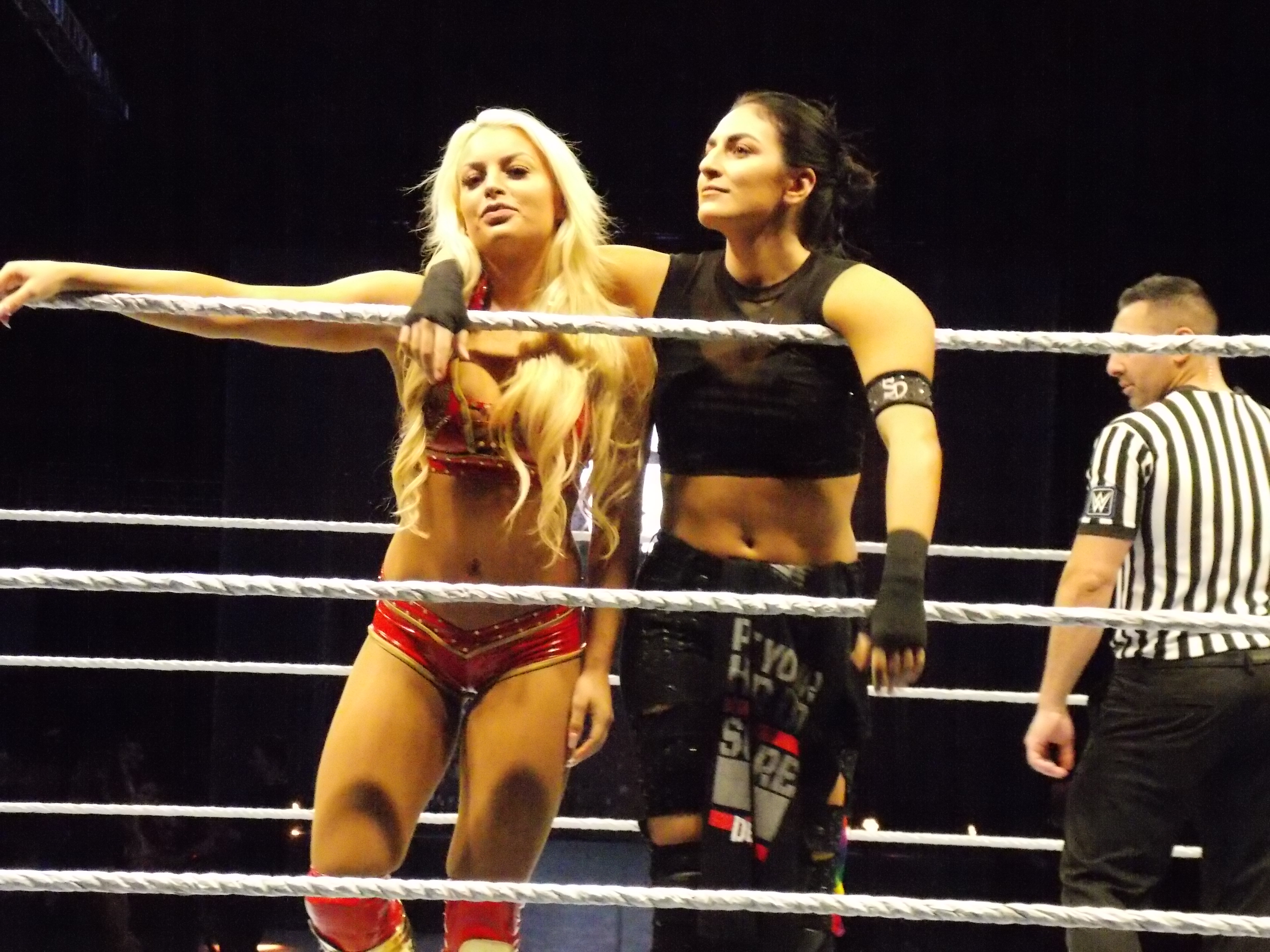
- Rose and Deville in August 2019

Tag team
- Leader: Paige
- Members: Mandy Rose; Sonya Deville
- Name(s): Absolution; Mandy Rose and Sonya Deville; Fire and Desire
- Debut: November 20, 2017
- Disbanded: April 3, 2020
- Years active: 2017–2020

Mandy Rose and Sonya Deville were a tag team in WWE. The team was formed in 2017 on the Raw brand originally as a trio called Absolution, which consisted of Paige (as the founder and leader), Rose and Deville with the latter two jumping to the main roster from NXT. In 2018, Paige retired from in-ring competition due to her injuries and became the SmackDown General Manager, ending her alliance with Rose and Deville. Rose and Deville continued teaming together and the team was renamed Fire and Desire in late 2019. The team dissolved in 2020 when Deville betrayed Rose by conniving with Dolph Ziggler to create friction between Rose and Otis. Today, only Paige is employed by the WWE as the only member of Absolution under contract.

== History ==
=== Absolution (2017–2018) ===
On the November 20, 2017 episode of Raw, the night after Survivor Series, Paige made her return to WWE after a year-long hiatus due to injury, along with the debuting Mandy Rose and Sonya Deville from NXT and attacked Bayley, Mickie James and Sasha Banks, while Alicia Fox managed to flee. The following week, the trio dubbed themselves "Absolution" and attacked Fox after her match with Asuka. Absolution had their first match as a team on the December 11 episode of Raw, in which Rose and Paige defeated Bayley and James in a tag team match. They had their first televised match as a trio at 2017 Tribute to the Troops, in which Paige, Rose and Deville defeated Bayley, Banks and James in a six-woman tag team match. They lost a rematch to Bayley, Banks and James by disqualification on the December 18 episode of Raw but defeated them on the December 25 episode of Raw. On December 27, Paige suffered a neck injury after receiving a kick from Banks during a six-man tag team match between Absolution and the team of Bayley, Banks and James at a house show, which led to the referee stopping the match. Paige's injury put her out of action but she continued to manage Rose and Deville during matches at ringside.

Rose and Deville continued to represent Absolution as a tag team and continued to trade wins with Bayley, Mickie James and Sasha Banks in tag team matches and six-man tag team matches throughout early 2018. Paige retired from in-ring competition on the post-WrestleMania 34 episode of Raw on April 9. The following night, on SmackDown, the SmackDown Commissioner Shane McMahon made Paige, the new general manager of the SmackDown brand after former general manager Daniel Bryan resigned from his position due to his in-ring return. On April 17, Rose and Deville joined Paige on the SmackDown brand in the 2018 Superstar Shake-up. However, Paige ended her association with the group by dissolving Absolution on the May 1 episode of SmackDown and refused to grant any favors to Rose and Deville.

=== Fire and Desire (2018–2020) ===
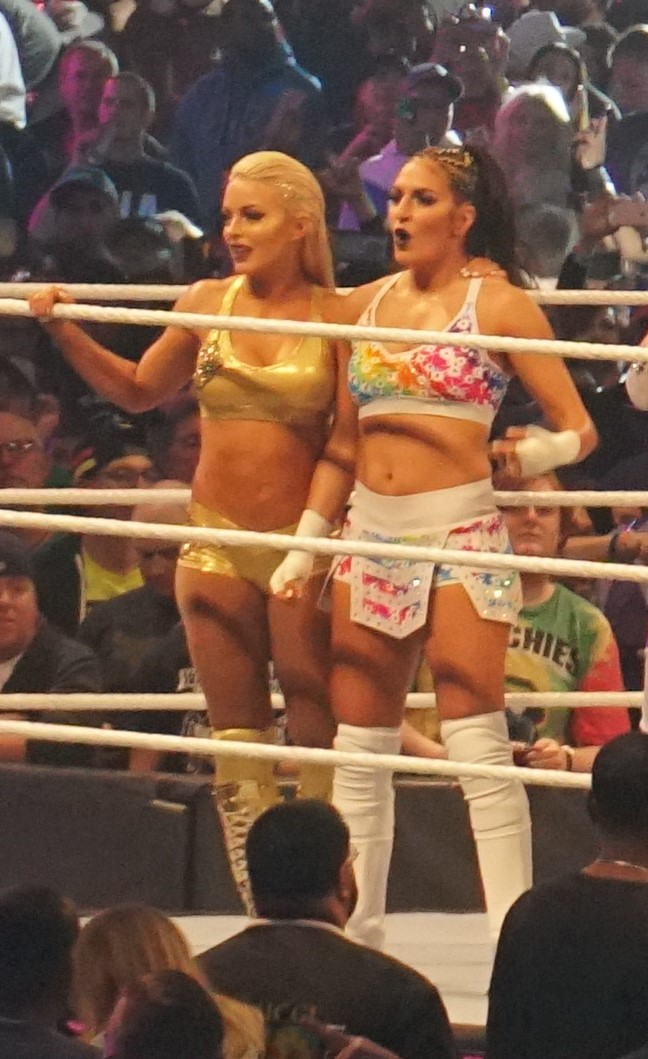
Rose (left) and Deville (right) at WrestleMania 34

Following the dissolution of Absolution, Rose and Deville continued their alliance as a tag team. Their first match as a team on SmackDown took place on the June 5 episode of SmackDown, where they lost to Asuka in a handicap match. Rose and Deville sporadically teamed together throughout 2018 and lost their matches to combinations of Asuka, Becky Lynch, Charlotte Flair and Naomi before picking up their first win on the December 4 episode of SmackDown by defeating Asuka and Flair. They also represented Team SmackDown against Team Raw in a five-on-five women's elimination match at Survivor Series, which Team SmackDown lost. Rose and Deville would then begin feuding with Naomi which led to Rose flirting with Naomi's husband Jimmy Uso, which led to the two sides exchanging wins with each other in singles competition.

On February 17, 2019, Rose and Deville participated in an Elimination Chamber match for the new Women's Tag Team Championship at the namesake event, which was won by The Boss 'n' Hug Connection (Bayley and Sasha Banks). Soon after, Rose and Deville began a feud with Asuka over her SmackDown Women's Championship, which Rose failed to win at Fastlane. Dissolution was teased as both of them had accidentally cost each other matches against Asuka during the feud but maintained their alliance.

On the August 5 episode of Raw, Rose and Deville participated in a fatal four-way elimination match for the Women's Tag Team Championship against the defending champions The IIconics (Billie Kay and Peyton Royce), The Kabuki Warriors (Asuka and Kairi Sane) and the team of Alexa Bliss and Nikki Cross. Rose and Deville eliminated IIconics from the match but were eliminated by Kabuki Warriors. Bliss and Cross went on to win the match. Shortly after, Rose and Deville's team was named "Fire and Desire" and they defeated Bliss and Cross in a non-title match on the September 3 episode of SmackDown, which earned them a title shot against Bliss and Cross for the Women's Tag Team Championship at Clash of Champions, which they lost. On the November 8 episode of SmackDown, Fire and Desire lost to Carmella and Dana Brooke in a qualification match for Team SmackDown at Survivor Series. Fire and Desire would then briefly feud with Bliss and Cross for the next two months which led to both teams exchanging wins. On the March 6, 2020 episode of SmackDown, Fire and Desire wrestled their last match as a team in which they defeated Carmella and Dana Brooke.

=== Breakup (2020) ===
In late 2019, Rose got involved in a romance storyline with Otis. Rose agreed to go on a Valentine's Day date with Otis on the February 14, 2020 episode of SmackDown, but Dolph Ziggler appeared in Otis's place during the date, which resulted in a romance between Rose and Ziggler. The storyline then evolved into a love triangle involving a feud between Otis and Ziggler over Rose. It was revealed on the April 3 episode of SmackDown that Deville was working with Ziggler to keep Otis from Rose, thus marking the breakup of Fire and Desire. On April 5 at WrestleMania 36, Rose interfered during a match between Otis and Ziggler by attacking Deville, who was at ringside, and Ziggler, which helped Otis score the victory.

This resulted in a feud between Rose and Deville, during which Deville branded her selfish out of jealousy and attacked her, vowing to "ruin her life". Deville would cost Rose, a Money in the Bank qualifying match against Carmella on the May 1 episode of SmackDown. This led to a match between Rose and Deville on the May 8 SmackDown, which Deville won. On the May 22 episode of SmackDown, Rose and Otis were defeated by Deville and Ziggler in a tag team match. On the August 14 edition of SmackDown, Rose challenged Deville to a Hair vs. Hair match at SummerSlam, which the latter accepted, but a week later, the stipulation was changed to a Loser Leaves WWE match. (Note: The stipulation for that match has been changed because Deville's home in Florida was broken in by a stalker in real life days after the August 14 episode was aired forcing WWE to change plans due to her lawyers opposing the fact that she does not want a bald head inside a courtroom.) by On August 23, Deville lost to Rose at SummerSlam, thus forcing Deville to (kayfabe) leave WWE.

=== Post-breakup ===
Rose would eventually be drafted to Raw while Deville would be reinstated as assistant to Adam Pearce on SmackDown in 2021.

Paige left WWE in July 2022 and signed with All Elite Wrestling (AEW) two months later under her real name, Saraya. In August 2023 at All In, Saraya won the AEW Women's World Championship in her home country, making her the first woman to have won women's world championships in WWE and AEW. Saraya left AEW in 2025 and returned to the WWE under the ring name of Paige in April 2026.

In July 2021, Rose was moved back to NXT and she founded her own stable called Toxic Attraction a month later. Toxic Attraction enjoyed huge success in NXT as the forefront of the NXT women's division during the NXT 2.0 era, with the stable holding the NXT Women's and NXT Women's Tag Team Championships from October 2021 to July 2022. Rose's sole NXT Women's Championship reign is the third longest at 413 days whereas her stablemates Gigi Dolin and Jacy Jayne won the NXT Women's Tag Team Championship for a record-tying two-times. In September 2022 at Worlds Collide, Rose unified the NXT UK Women's Championship into the NXT Women's Championship. In the middle of October 2022, Deville returned to NXT to assist Toxic Attraction in Rose's temporary absence. In December 2022, Rose was released from her WWE contract a day after she lost her title and her stable was disbanded in February 2023.

In July 2023, Deville won the WWE Women's Tag Team Championship with Chelsea Green. However, Deville was forced to relinquish the title less than a month later after suffering an ACL injury. On February 7, 2025, Deviile left WWE after her contract expired and later debuted in partner promotion Total Nonstop Action Wrestling under the name Daria Rae in 2026.
