= NXT TakeOver: WarGames (2017) =

WWE Network event

- Promotional poster featuring various NXT wrestlers
- Promotion: WWE
- Brand: NXT
- Date: November 18, 2017
- City: Houston, Texas
- Venue: Toyota Center
- Tagline: Houston, We Have A WarGames

WWE event chronology
← Previous; TLC: Tables, Ladders & Chairs	Next → Survivor Series

NXT TakeOver chronology
← Previous; Brooklyn III	Next → Philadelphia

NXT TakeOver: WarGames chronology
← Previous; First	Next → 2018

The 2017 NXT TakeOver: WarGames was a professional wrestling livestreaming event produced by WWE, held exclusively for wrestlers from the promotion's developmental brand, NXT. It was the 17th NXT TakeOver event and the inaugural NXT WarGames. It took place on November 18, 2017, at the Toyota Center in Houston, Texas as part of that year's Survivor Series weekend and aired exclusively on the WWE Network. The event centered on WWE's first-ever men's WarGames match, a type of roofless steel cage match that surrounds two rings placed side by side and is contested by teams of multiple wrestlers; the first team to score a pinfall or submission wins while escaping the cage is a forfeit.

Five matches were contested at the event. The main event was the WarGames match, which was contested between three teams and saw The Undisputed Era (Adam Cole, Bobby Fish, and Kyle O'Reilly) defeat Sanity (Alexander Wolfe, Eric Young, and Killian Dain) and the team of Roderick Strong and The Authors of Pain (Akam and Rezar). On the undercard, Ember Moon defeated Kairi Sane, Nikki Cross, and Peyton Royce in a fatal four-way match to win the vacant NXT Women's Championship, and Andrade Cien Almas defeated Drew McIntyre to win the NXT Championship.

The event was originally titled as NXT TakeOver: Houston before it was repurposed around the WarGames match. This was the first time the match was held since September 2000 as it was originally used in the National Wrestling Alliance and later, World Championship Wrestling, the latter of which WWE acquired in 2001. During the NXT TakeOver: Philadelphia pre-show in January 2018, TakeOver: WarGames won the NXT Year-End Award for "NXT TakeOver of the Year".

== Production ==
=== Background ===
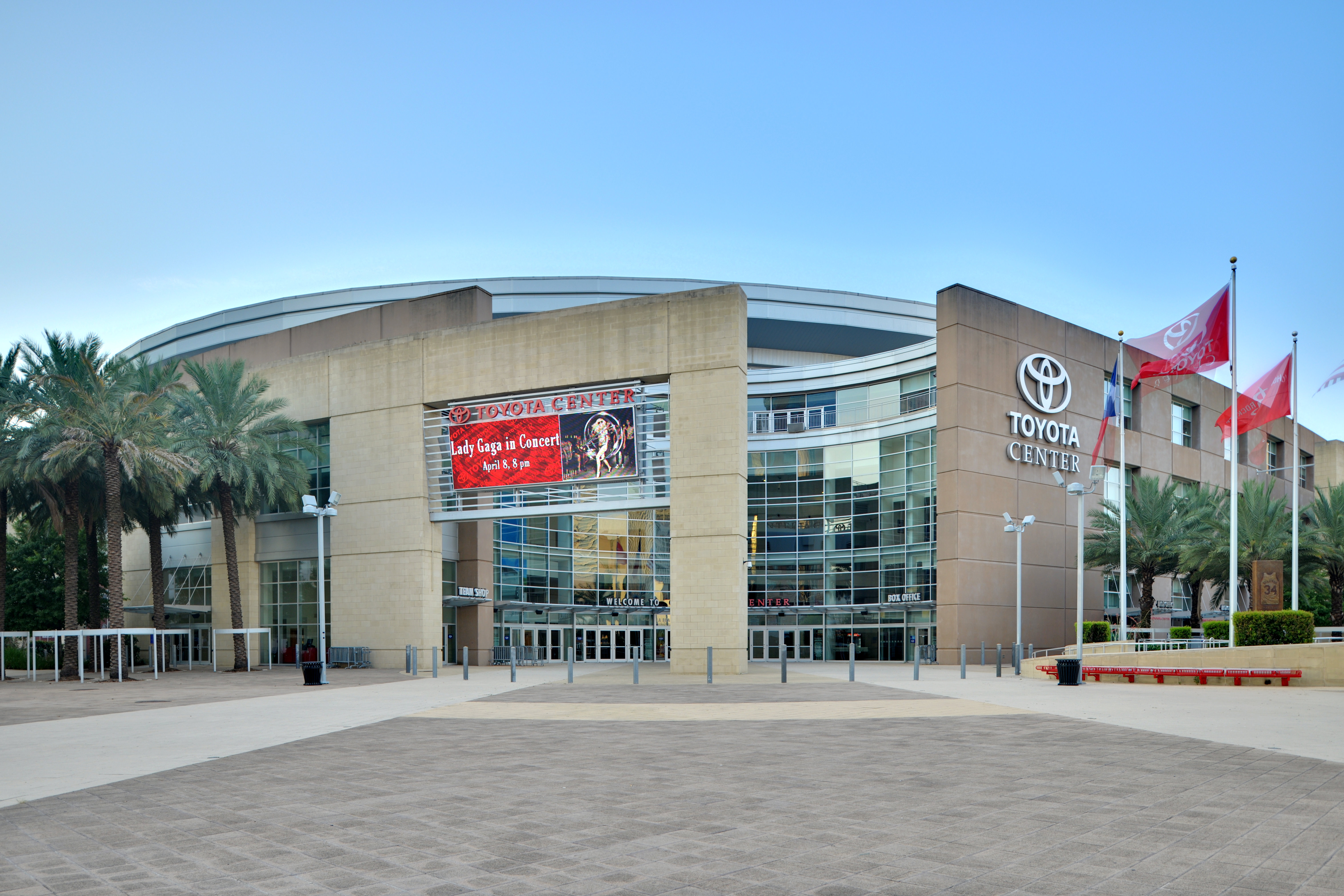
The 17th NXT TakeOver event, which was the inaugural NXT WarGames, was held at the Toyota Center in Houston, Texas.

TakeOver was a series of professional wrestling events that began in May 2014, as WWE's developmental brand, NXT, held its second WWE Network-exclusive livestreaming event, billed as TakeOver. The "TakeOver" moniker subsequently became the branding for all of NXT's major events held periodically throughout the year. The 17th TakeOver event was originally announced on November 17, 2016, as TakeOver: Houston, as the event was scheduled to take place in Houston, Texas at the Toyota Center on Saturday, November 18, 2017, held as a support show for that year's Survivor Series for the main roster at the same venue.

On October 4, 2017, NXT's head of creative Paul "Triple H" Levesque announced that the event would be based around WWE's first-ever WarGames match, subsequently rebranding the event as TakeOver: WarGames. The match was originally used in the National Wrestling Alliance (NWA), and later, an annual match held by World Championship Wrestling (WCW), the latter of which was acquired by WWE in 2001; this marked the first time in nearly 20 years since the match last occurred on the September 4, 2000, episode of WCW Monday Nitro.

The WarGames match is a type of steel cage match that surrounds two rings placed side by side. It is contested by two or three teams composed of three to six members each. One member from each team starts in the cage, and every couple of minutes, another team member enters in a staggered format until all participants have entered. Once all participants are in the cage, the match officially begins and the first team to score a pinfall or submission wins. In the older format in NWA and WCW, the cage had a roof and there were no penalties for exiting the cage; WWE's version removed the roof and stipulated that escaping the cage is a forfeit.

=== Storylines ===
The card included matches that resulted from scripted storylines. Results were predetermined by WWE's writers on the NXT brand, while storylines were produced on WWE's weekly television program, NXT.

On the September 6 episode of NXT, Asuka relinquished the NXT Women's Championship due to a legitimate injury she sustained at TakeOver: Brooklyn III; she was subsequently moved up to the main roster on the Raw brand. On September 12, Kairi Sane won the Mae Young Classic and earned herself a shot at the vacant NXT Women's Championship at TakeOver: WarGames. On the September 27 episode of NXT, General Manager William Regal made the match at WarGames a fatal four-way for the vacant NXT Women's Championship, with qualifying matches held over the following weeks to determine the other three participants. On the October 11 episode, Peyton Royce defeated Nikki Cross (of Sanity) and Liv Morgan to qualify for the match by pinning Cross after she was distracted by Taynara Conti, who was escorted by The Undisputed Era. The following week, Ember Moon qualified by defeating Ruby Riott and Sonya Deville. On the next episode, Nikki Cross last eliminated Billie Kay in a battle royal to qualify for the last spot in the fatal four-way. Cross later defeated Conti in a singles match on the November 1 episode. The following week, Sane defeated Kay in singles competition. The next week, after Moon defeated Mercedes Martinez, the other three competitors came to the ring and ringside area and stared each other down.

At TakeOver: Brooklyn III, Drew McIntyre defeated Bobby Roode to win the NXT Championship; Roode was then promoted to the main roster on the SmackDown brand. On the October 4 episode of NXT, McIntyre successfully defended his title against Roderick Strong. Two weeks later, Andrade Cien Almas's manager, Zelina Vega, interrupted McIntyre's interview, stating that Almas and McIntyre were the same, accusing him of avoiding Almas, and expressing Almas's interest in challenging him for the title. On the October 25 episode, Vega said that they had been waiting for a contract for an NXT Championship match with McIntyre, saying that McIntyre and Strong were weak compared to Almas. Almas then defeated Strong after Vega physically interfered in their match. Afterwards, Vega challenged McIntyre to meet Almas in the ring the next week. After the show went off the air, general manager William Regal, in a video posted to Twitter, announced that McIntyre versus Almas for the title had been made official and their confrontation next week would be a contract signing. On the November 1 episode, McIntyre signed the contract to defend his title at WarGames and brought it out to the ring, where Almas attacked McIntyre and signed the contract as well. McIntyre called Almas out on the November 15 episode, stating that Almas was taking orders from Vega and wondered if she would ever let him off his leash. Vega and Almas then came out and attacked McIntyre, standing tall with the title.

At TakeOver: Brooklyn III, Sanity (Alexander Wolfe and Eric Young) defeated The Authors of Pain (Akam and Rezar) to win the NXT Tag Team Championship. After the match, Bobby Fish and Kyle O'Reilly attacked all four competitors. Over the next several weeks, Adam Cole (who debuted at Brooklyn III by attacking newly crowned NXT Champion Drew McIntyre), Fish, and O'Reilly, now calling themselves "The Undisputed Era", and Sanity (including Killian Dain) brawled with each other after their respective matches. On the September 27 episode of NXT, Cole made his in-ring debut by defeating Young after Young was distracted with the faction brawl at ringside. The next week, after McIntyre successfully defended his title against Roderick Strong, The Undisputed Era came out to urge Strong to join them. On the October 18 episode, The Authors of Pain attacked Sanity during their match with Undisputed Era, holding up the tag titles and staring down Undisputed Era. The following week, after Strong's match with Andrade "Cien" Almas, Undisputed Era came down to the ring to convince Strong to join them, telling him to "think it over". On the November 1 episode, the Authors defeated Sanity by disqualification in their tag team championship rematch after they were attacked by The Undisputed Era, who beat up Sanity. Strong came out, teasing joining Undisputed Era, but attacked Cole instead, sending them running. General manager William Regal then came out and announced that in order to restore order, the three teams would face off in the only match that could contain them, a WarGames match at TakeOver: WarGames. On the November 8 episode, Strong defeated Cole by disqualification after Fish and O'Reilly pulled him out of the ring. After the match, a brawl ensued between all three teams.

On the September 20 episode of NXT, Aleister Black began a promo on his career so far, but was interrupted by Velveteen Dream, who called Black "afraid." Black then kicked the microphone out of Dream's hand. On the October 4 episode, Black was scheduled to compete against the debuting Lio Rush, but the latter was attacked by Dream, who said he would make Black "say his name." Dream then defeated Rush the following week, celebrating with Black's signature pose. The following week, during Black's match with Raul Mendoza, Dream came to ringside and wore Black's jacket, eliciting a stare from Black. On the October 25 episode, before Black's scheduled match, Dream attacked him. Then, Black ran him off and stared him down. The following episode, a video was played showing Black challenging Dream to a match at TakeOver, stating he had his attention and in which it was made official. The next week, on the November 8 episode, Dream defeated Cezar Bononi and accepted Black's challenge to a match at WarGames, promising that Black's lips would say his name.

On the November 8 episode of NXT, Kassius Ohno requested a match against Lars Sullivan to prove he belongs in the NXT Championship picture, which Regal accepted and made it official. The next week, after Sullivan defeated Raul Mendoza, Ohno stopped Sullivan from attacking Mendoza, staring each other down as Sullivan left the ring.

== Event ==
Other on-screen personnel
Role:	Name:
Commentators	Mauro Ranallo
Commentators	Nigel McGuinness
Commentators	Percy Watson
Ring announcer	Mike Rome
Referees	Tom Castor
Referees	Drake Wuertz
Referees	Eddie Orengo
Referees	Darryl Sharma
Pre-show panel	Charly Caruso
Pre-show panel	Sam Roberts
Pre-show panel	Booker T

=== Preliminary matches ===
The event opened with Lars Sullivan facing Kassius Ohno. Sullivan performed a Freak Accident on Ohno to win the match.

Next, Aleister Black faced the Velveteen Dream. Black executed Black Mass on Dream to win the match. After the match, Black acknowledged Dream.

After that, Kairi Sane, Ember Moon, Peyton Royce, and Nikki Cross competed in a fatal four-way match for the vacant NXT Women's Championship. Moon performed the Eclipse on Royce and Cross, and pinned the latter to win the title.

In the penultimate match, Drew McIntyre defended the NXT Championship against Andrade Cien Almas, accompanied by Zelina Vega. Almas performed a Double knee smash on McIntyre, who was seated in the corner, for a near-fall. McIntyre performed a Future Shock DDT on Almas for a near-fall. Whilst the referee was distracted by Almas holding the title belt, Vega performed a Hurricanrana Driver on McIntyre. Almas performed a Hammerlock DDT on McIntyre for a near-fall. McIntyre performed a Claymore Kick on Almas, but Vega placed Almas' foot on the bottom rope, voiding the pinfall at a two count. McIntyre attempted a second Claymore, but Almas avoided and performed an elevated Hammerlock DDT on McIntyre to win the title.

=== Main event ===
In the main event, NXT Tag Team Champions Sanity (Eric Young, Alexander Wolfe, and Killian Dain), the Undisputed Era (Adam Cole, Kyle O'Reilly, and Bobby Fish), and the team of The Authors of Pain (Akam and Rezar) and Roderick Strong competed in a WarGames match. Young, Cole and Strong began the match. After the first countdown, O'Reilly and Fish entered, assisting Cole in attacking Young and Strong. After the second countdown, Akam and Rezar entered and dominated the other participants. After the third countdown, Wolfe and Dain entered the match. Wolfe attacked Akam and Rezar with a nightstick while Dain retrieved trash cans, steel chairs, kendo sticks, and two tables. Dain used a steel chain to lock the door then (kayfabe) swallowed the key. Fish and O'Reilly performed Chasing the Dragon on Strong whilst Cole performed a Superkick on Strong. O'Reilly applied a Cross Armbreaker using a chain on Wolfe but Young performed a Diving elbow drop on O'Reilly to break the hold. Wolfe performed a super German Suplex on Akam through two tables. Dain performed a Coast-to-Coast on O'Reilly into a trash can. Strong performed a Superplex off the cage on Cole onto the other participants and scored a near-fall. Akam and Rezar performed The Last Chapter on Dain on the steel platform. O'Reilly and Fish performed Total Elimination on Rezar. Wolfe and Young performed a Belly to back suplex/Diving Neckbreaker combination on O'Reilly. Young performed a Wheelbarrow Suplex into the cage on Strong. Cole struck Young with a kendo stick and performed a Shining Wizard on Young into a steel chair to win the match.

== Aftermath ==
The 2017 TakeOver: WarGames would be the first in an annual WarGames chronology for NXT. For the next three years, the event continued to be held as a subseries of TakeOvers. While the events from 2017 to 2019 were held in November as support shows for WWE's annual Survivor Series event for the main roster, the 2020 event ended this tradition, with the event being held in December, and it was also the first to be available via pay-per-view (PPV) in addition to livestreaming. The TakeOver series was discontinued in late 2021, with the 2021 WarGames being NXT's first PPV and livestreaming event held following TakeOver's discontinuation. The 2021 event would in turn be the final NXT WarGames, as in 2022, the WarGames concept was moved to the main roster as part of Survivor Series, with that year's event rebranded as Survivor Series: WarGames. The NXT WarGames event was replaced by NXT Deadline.

== Results ==
No.	Results	Stipulations	Times
1^{N}	Ruby Riot defeated Sonya Deville by pinfall	Singles match	7:05
2^{N}	Pete Dunne (c) defeated Johnny Gargano by pinfall	Singles match for the WWE United Kingdom Championship	9:21
3	Lars Sullivan defeated Kassius Ohno by pinfall	Singles match	5:11
4	Aleister Black defeated Velveteen Dream by pinfall	Singles match	14:37
5	Ember Moon defeated Kairi Sane, Nikki Cross, and Peyton Royce by pinfall	Fatal four-way match for the vacant NXT Women's Championship	9:52
6	Andrade "Cien" Almas (with Zelina Vega) defeated Drew McIntyre (c) by pinfall	Singles match for the NXT Championship	14:52
7	The Undisputed Era (Adam Cole, Kyle O'Reilly, and Bobby Fish) defeated The Authors of Pain (Akam and Rezar,) and Roderick Strong and SAni†Y (Alexander Wolfe, Eric Young, and Killian Dain) by pinfall	WarGames match	36:37
(c) / – the champion(s) heading into the match; N / – the match was taped for a future broadcast of NXT
