= NXT TakeOver: WarGames (2018) =

WWE Network event

- Promotional poster featuring various NXT wrestlers
- Promotion: WWE
- Brand: NXT
- Date: November 17, 2018
- City: Los Angeles, California
- Venue: Staples Center
- Attendance: 13,598

WWE event chronology
← Previous; Crown Jewel	Next → Survivor Series

NXT TakeOver chronology
← Previous; Brooklyn 4	Next → Phoenix

NXT TakeOver: WarGames chronology
← Previous; 2017	Next → 2019

The 2018 NXT TakeOver: WarGames was a professional wrestling livestreaming event produced by WWE, held exclusively for wrestlers from the promotion's developmental brand, NXT. It was the 22nd NXT TakeOver event and the second annual NXT WarGames. It took place on November 17, 2018, at the Staples Center in Los Angeles, California as part of that year's Survivor Series weekend and aired exclusively on the WWE Network. The event centered on the men's WarGames match, a type of roofless steel cage match that surrounds two rings placed side by side and is contested by teams of multiple wrestlers; the first team to score a pinfall or submission wins while escaping the cage is a forfeit.

Five matches were contested at the event. The main event was the WarGames match where the team of Pete Dunne, Ricochet, and War Raiders (Hanson and Rowe) defeated The Undisputed Era (Adam Cole, Bobby Fish, Kyle O'Reilly, and Roderick Strong). In the penultimate match, Tommaso Ciampa defeated Velveteen Dream to retain the NXT Championship and Aleister Black defeated Johnny Gargano.

== Production ==
=== Background ===
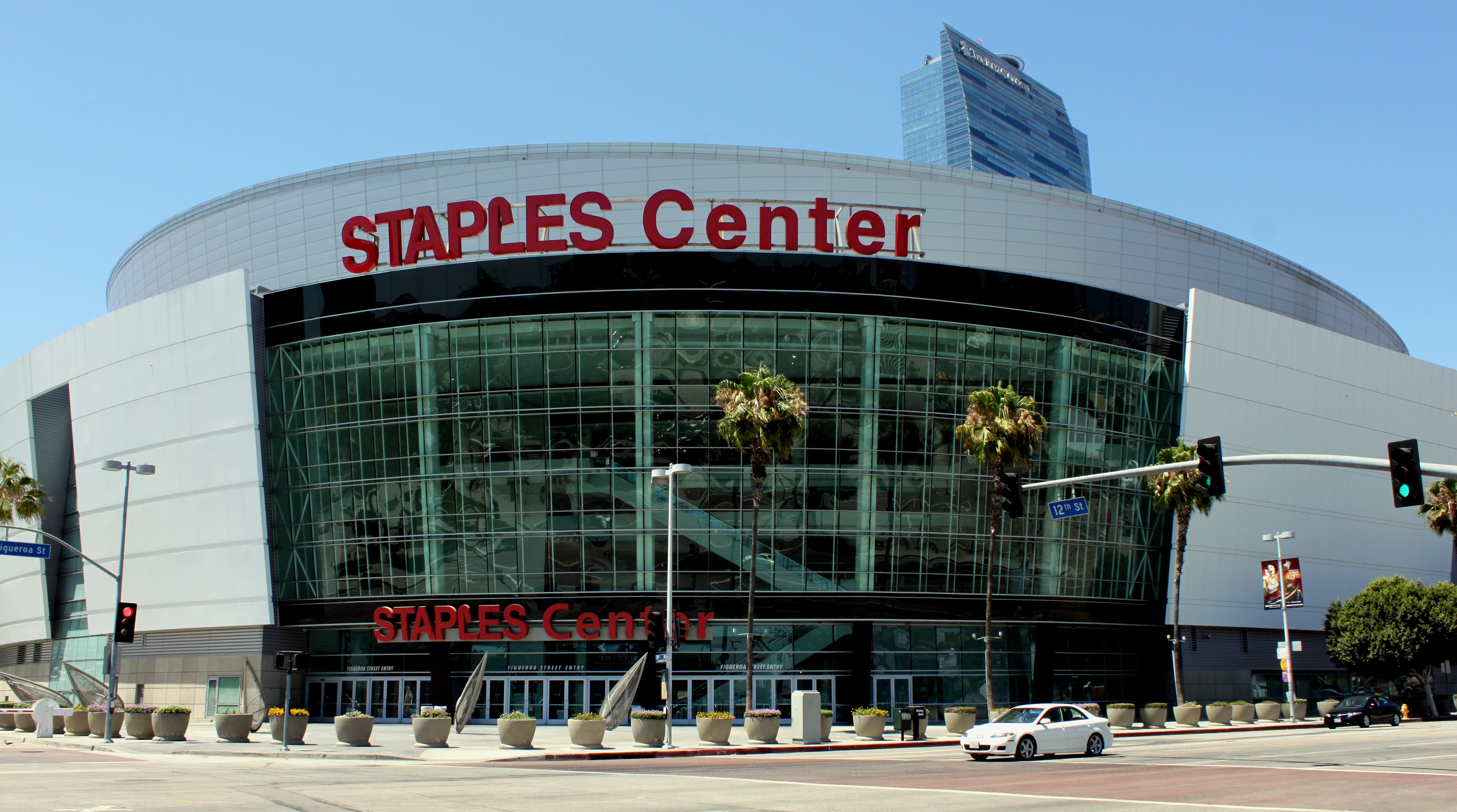
The 22nd NXT TakeOver event, which was the second annual NXT WarGames, was held at the Staples Center in Los Angeles, California.

TakeOver was a series of professional wrestling events that began in May 2014, as WWE's developmental brand, NXT, held its second WWE Network-exclusive livestreaming event, billed as TakeOver. The "TakeOver" moniker subsequently became the branding for all of NXT's major events held periodically throughout the year. In 2017, NXT held TakeOver: WarGames, which centered on the WarGames match and was held as a support show for that year's Survivor Series for the main roster. On November 16, 2017, the 22nd TakeOver event was announced to be held as the second annual TakeOver: WarGames, and it was scheduled for Saturday, November 17, 2018, at the Staples Center in Los Angeles, California as a support show for that year's Survivor Series. This established WarGames as an annual subseries of TakeOvers that feature the WarGames match and held as support shows for WWE's annual Survivor Series. Tickets went on sale on July 20.

The WarGames match is a type of roofless steel cage match that surrounds two rings placed side by side. It is contested by two or three teams composed of three to six members each. One member from each team starts in the cage, and every couple of minutes, another team member enters in a staggered format until all participants have entered. Once all participants are in the cage, the match officially begins and the first team to score a pinfall or submission wins, while escaping the cage is a forfeit.

=== Storylines ===
The event included matches that resulted from scripted storylines. Results were predetermined by WWE's writers on the NXT brand, while storylines were produced on WWE's weekly television program, NXT.

On the July 25 episode of NXT, Aleister Black lost the NXT Championship to Tommaso Ciampa due to interference from Johnny Gargano. On the August 8 episode of NXT, Black and Gargano fought to a no contest when Ciampa attacked both men. A triple threat match between the three for the title was scheduled for TakeOver: Brooklyn 4. After the show was over, Black was later found unconscious in the parking lot (This was done to allow Black to recover from a groin injury he underwent surgery for). With Black out of action after a groin injury, the match was changed to a Last Man Standing match between Ciampa and Gargano, which Ciampa won. On the October 24 edition of NXT, Gargano was revealed as the one who attacked Black before their original TakeOver: Brooklyn 4 title match, turning heel in the process. The following week, a match between the two was scheduled for the event.

On the October 31 episode of NXT, Adam Cole and Bobby Fish of The Undisputed Era were scheduled to face War Raiders (Hanson and Rowe) in the main event. However, Hanson and Rowe attacked the group during a backstage promo. The fight ended up in the ring, where the Undisputed Era got the upper hand. Ricochet entered on the War Raiders' behalf, but was ultimately overtaken. Pete Dunne evened the odds for Hanson, Rowe and Ricochet. During the brawl, NXT general manager William Regal announced that the two sides would face each other in a WarGames match.

At Evolution, Shayna Baszler won the NXT Women's Championship back from Kairi Sane after interference from Baszler's fellow and former MMA Four Horsewomen Jessamyn Duke and Marina Shafir, becoming the first two-time NXT Women's Champion. On the November 7 episode of NXT, as Sane was invoking her rematch clause, a two out of three falls match between the two for the title was scheduled for TakeOver.

== Event ==
Other on-screen personnel
Role:	Name:
English commentators	Mauro Ranallo
English commentators	Nigel McGuinness
English commentators	Percy Watson
Spanish commentators	Carlos Cabrera
Spanish commentators	Marcelo Rodríguez
Ring announcer	Kayla Braxton
Referees	Tom Castor
Referees	Drake Wuertz
Referees	Eddie Orengo
Referees	Darryl Sharma
Pre-show panel	Charly Caruso
Pre-show panel	Sam Roberts
Pre-show panel	Pat McAfee

=== Preliminary matches ===
The event opened with Matt Riddle facing Kassius Ohno. Riddle immediately performed a jumping high knee on Ohno to win in only six seconds.

Next, Shayna Baszler defended the NXT Women's Championship against Kairi Sane in a two out of three falls match. Baszler scored the first fall by making Sane submit to the "Kirifuda Clutch" after interference from Jessamyn Duke and Marina Shafir. Sane scored the second fall after an "Insane Elbow" on Baszler. Duke and Shafir tried to interfere again only for Dakota Kai and Io Shirai to stop them. Shirai then performed a Moonsault on Duke and Shafir. Sane performed an "Insane Elbow", but Baszler countered into a roll up to retain the title.

After that, Aleister Black faced Johnny Gargano. Gargano performed a slingshot DDT on Black for a near-fall. Black performed a diving meteora on Gargano for a near-fall. Gargano applied the "Garga-No Escape", but Black touched the ropes. In the end, Black performed two consecutive "Black Masses" on Gargano to win.

In the penultimate match, Tommaso Ciampa defended the NXT Championship against Velveteen Dream. Ciampa performed a "Project Ciampa" on Dream for a near-fall. Dream performed the "Purple Rainmaker" on Ciampa for a near-fall. Dream attempted a second "Purple Rainmaker" again on the ring apron but Ciampa avoided. Ciampa performed an elevated DDT on Dream onto the metal divider between the rings to retain the championship.

=== Main event ===
The main event was a WarGames match between The Undisputed Era (Adam Cole, Bobby Fish, Kyle O'Reilly, and Roderick Strong) and the team of WWE United Kingdom Champion Pete Dunne, NXT North American Champion Ricochet and War Raiders (Hanson and Rowe). The match began with Cole and Ricochet in the ring. After 5 minutes, O’Reilly of The Undisputed Era joined the match. Three minutes after, Hanson would join the match, and following a further three minutes, Strong joined the match. After another three minutes, Rowe joined the match and simultaneously performed a powerslam and powerbomb on O’Reilly and Strong respectively. After another 3 minutes, Fish escaped and locked Dunne in a cage, throwing the key lock into the audience. Fish then retrieved chairs for the Undisputed Era who struck Ricochet, Hanson and Rowe with the chairs. Three minutes afterwards, the referees attempted to unlock Dunne's cage, but failed to do so as The Undisputed Era's and Dunne's cages used different keys for the individual locks and thus a bolt-cutter had to be used to open the cage. Dunne struck Fish and O’Reilly with a kendo stick and retrieved tables, trash cans, a steel chain and kendo sticks for his team. During the climax, Cole reversed the "Bitter End" into a DDT and performed the "Last Shot" on Dunne for a near-fall. Ricochet and Cole went up to the top of the cage, and all competitors climbed up with them to help their team gain momentum. Cole got suplexed and everybody was left lying, and Ricochet performed a double Moonsault onto the pile. Cole went for another attempt at the Last Shot, but Dunne reversed it into the "Bitter End" and Ricochet executed a springboard 450° splash and both of them pinned Cole for the win.

== Results ==
No.	Results	Stipulations	Times
1^{N}	Keith Lee defeated Fidel Bravo by pinfall	Singles match	1:59
2^{N}	Lars Sullivan defeated Keita Murray by pinfall	Singles match	0:35
3^{N}	Nikki Cross defeated Candice LeRae by pinfall	Singles match	7:00
4	Matt Riddle defeated Kassius Ohno by pinfall	Singles match	0:06
5	Shayna Baszler (c) defeated Kairi Sane by 2–1	Two out of three falls match for the NXT Women's Championship	10:55
6	Aleister Black defeated Johnny Gargano by pinfall	Singles match	18:10
7	Tommaso Ciampa (c) defeated Velveteen Dream by pinfall	Singles match for the NXT Championship	22:25
8	Pete Dunne, Ricochet, and War Raiders (Hanson and Rowe) defeated The Undisputed Era (Adam Cole, Bobby Fish, Kyle O'Reilly, and Roderick Strong) by pinfall	WarGames match	47:10
(c) / – the champion(s) heading into the match; N / – the match was taped for a future broadcast of NXT
