= NXT WarGames =

WWE pay-per-view and livestreaming event series

- NXT WarGames 2021 logo
- Promotion: WWE
- Brand: NXT
- Other name: NXT TakeOver: WarGames (2017–2020)
- First event: 2017
- Last event: 2021
- Signature match: WarGames match

NXT WarGames (originally known as NXT TakeOver: WarGames) was a professional wrestling event produced annually by WWE, a Connecticut-based professional wrestling promotion. Held exclusively for wrestlers from the promotion's developmental territory NXT, it was broadcast live and available only through pay-per-view (PPV) and the livestreaming services Peacock and the WWE Network. The event was originally established in 2017 and held under the NXT TakeOver series. In September 2021, WWE discontinued the TakeOver series with the 2021 WarGames being NXT's first major event held following TakeOver's discontinuation.

The event centered on the WarGames match, which was created by Dusty Rhodes in 1987. The WarGames match is a type of steel cage match, except there are two rings positioned right next to each other, and the roofless cage surrounds both rings. While originally only contested by men, the first women's version of the match occurred at the 2019 event. The main event of each WarGames event was contested as a WarGames match.

From 2017 to 2019, the event was held in November as a support show for Survivor Series, but it was moved to December in 2020. The 2021 event was NXT's last major event to air on traditional PPV, as in 2022, WWE shifted to only broadcasting NXT's major events via the livestreaming platforms. The 2021 event was also the final NXT WarGames event, as the match concept was moved to the main roster as part of the 2022 Survivor Series, with the NXT WarGames event being replaced by NXT Deadline.

== History ==
NXT TakeOver was a series of periodic professional wrestling events produced by WWE for the company's developmental brand NXT. The 17th TakeOver event was originally titled as TakeOver: Houston, as the event was held in Houston, Texas; however, the event's name was changed to TakeOver: WarGames after an announcement by WWE executive Triple H on October 4, 2017. The event's name was derived from an old match type created by Dusty Rhodes in 1987 and originally used by the National Wrestling Alliance's (NWA) Jim Crockett Promotions (JCP), and later, an annual match held by World Championship Wrestling (WCW), which WWE acquired in 2001. The TakeOver event featured the namesake match, which was the first time in nearly twenty years since the match last occurred. The inaugural TakeOver: WarGames was held on November 18, 2017, at Houston's Toyota Center and livestreamed on the WWE Network. It was a support show for that year's Survivor Series pay-per-view (PPV).

A second TakeOver: WarGames was held the following year, also as a support show for that year's Survivor Series. This in turn established the event as an annual subseries of the main TakeOver series. In September 2019, NXT, which had previously been a developmental territory for WWE, became one of the company's three main brands, thus the 2019 event was the first TakeOver held following this recognition.

Due to the COVID-19 pandemic, which began affecting the industry in mid-March 2020, NXT's events were held exclusively at NXT's home base of Full Sail University in Winter Park, Florida with no fans in attendance. In October, NXT's events were moved to the WWE Performance Center in Orlando, Florida, where the main arena was reconfigured as the Capitol Wrestling Center, which was similar to the WWE ThunderDome, a bio-secure bubble utilized for the promotion's Raw and SmackDown brands. The 2020 event was in turn held at the Capitol Wrestling Center (which became NXT's permanent home base), as well as the first TakeOver: WarGames to air on traditional PPV in addition to the WWE Network. Additionally, unlike the previous events, the 2020 event aired in December two weeks after that year's Survivor Series instead of the night before.

In September 2021, the NXT brand went through a restructuring and reverted to a developmental territory for WWE. The Capitol Wrestling Center name was also dropped. In October, it was speculated that the company may end the TakeOver series as another TakeOver event was not scheduled for 2021 after TakeOver 36 in August. On November 9, 2021, NXT's fifth WarGames event was announced to be held on December 5 that year. The announcement confirmed that the event would not be a TakeOver event, thus marking NXT's first PPV and livestreaming event to be held following TakeOver's discontinuation, as well as the first non-TakeOver to air on either of these broadcast outlets since Halftime Heat in February 2019, as well as the first event held following NXT's rebranding. It was also the first WarGames to air on Peacock after the American version of the WWE Network merged under Peacock in March. This was also NXT's last major event to air on traditional PPV, as beginning in 2022, WWE shifted to only broadcasting NXT's major events on the livestreaming services. On the day of the event's announcement, WWE had originally made a post on Twitter that had the event titled as "TakeOver: WarGames"; however, the Tweet was quickly deleted and WWE reposted the announcement with the "TakeOver" title removed.

On September 19, 2022, WWE announced that its annual Survivor Series event that year for its main roster brands Raw and SmackDown would be branded Survivor Series WarGames and feature two WarGames matches. This subsequently ended the WarGames event for NXT, as it was replaced by NXT Deadline.

== Concept ==
The event centered on the WarGames match, and the main event of each show was contested in the titular structure. The WarGames match is a type of steel cage match, except there are two rings positioned right next to each other, and the roofless rectangular cage surrounds the edge of both rings. The match consists of two or three teams, with between three and five participants on each team facing off with each other in a staggered entry format. At the start, one member of each team enters the cage. After five minutes, a member from an opposing team enters the cage, giving their team the temporary 2-on-1 handicap advantage. After two minutes, a random member from the other team enters and this continues every 2 minutes, alternating between each team until everyone has entered. Once all team members from both teams are in the cage, the match officially begins. Both teams wrestle each other in the cage until any participant either submits, surrenders, or is knocked unconscious. There were originally no pinfalls, no count-outs, and no disqualifications; however, later WCW versions began to allow pinfalls, which continued with WWE's version. Additionally in WWE's variation, if one member of a team escapes the cage, their whole team is disqualified. While originally contested only by men, the first women's WarGames match occurred at the 2019 event.

In a 2022 interview with The Ringer, Triple H explained the removal of the cage's roof, which the original NWA/JCP and WCW versions had. Triple H said:

When we first started redoing [the match], people were upset that we didn't have a top on the cage. And I was like, "Well, we already have one with the top on Hell in a Cell." And the other thing is, it used to drive me nuts when I was a kid that the cage was too short. You'd see like what happened with Brian Pillman, where he got put up for a powerbomb and it wasn't enough space. [Taking the top off the cage] allows you to do so much more stuff. Look, in the old generation, no one was about to jump off the top of that cage. The times have changed, the business has evolved, and the cage that WarGames is held in needed to evolve, too.

== Events ==
#	Event	Date	City	Venue	Main event	Ref.
1	NXT TakeOver: WarGames (2017)	November 18, 2017	Houston, Texas	Toyota Center	The Undisputed Era (Adam Cole, Bobby Fish, and Kyle O'Reilly) vs. The Authors of Pain (Akam and Rezar) and Roderick Strong vs. SAni†Y (Alexander Wolfe, Eric Young, and Killian Dain) in a WarGames match	
2	NXT TakeOver: WarGames (2018)	November 17, 2018	Los Angeles, California	Staples Center	Pete Dunne, Ricochet, and War Raiders (Hanson and Rowe) vs. The Undisputed Era (Adam Cole, Bobby Fish, Kyle O'Reilly, and Roderick Strong) in a WarGames match	
3	NXT TakeOver: WarGames (2019)	November 23, 2019	Rosemont, Illinois	Allstate Arena	Team Ciampa (Tommaso Ciampa, Keith Lee, Dominik Dijakovic, and Kevin Owens) vs. The Undisputed Era (Adam Cole, Bobby Fish, Kyle O'Reilly, and Roderick Strong) in a WarGames match	
4	NXT TakeOver: WarGames (2020)	December 6, 2020	Orlando, Florida	Capitol Wrestling Center at WWE Performance Center	The Undisputed Era (Adam Cole, Bobby Fish, Kyle O'Reilly, and Roderick Strong) vs. Team McAfee (Pat McAfee, Pete Dunne, Danny Burch, and Oney Lorcan) in a WarGames match	
5	NXT WarGames (2021)	December 5, 2021	Orlando, Florida	WWE Performance Center	Team Black & Gold (Tommaso Ciampa, Johnny Gargano, Pete Dunne, and L. A. Knight) vs. Team 2.0 (Bron Breakker, Carmelo Hayes, Grayson Waller, and Tony D'Angelo) in a WarGames match	
(c) – refers to the champion(s) heading into the match

== See also ==
- List of WWE pay-per-view and livestreaming supercards
