= NXT TakeOver 36 =

2021 WWE pay-per-view and livestreaming event

- Promotional poster featuring Karrion Kross and Samoa Joe
- Promotion: WWE
- Brand: NXT
- Date: August 22, 2021
- City: Orlando, Florida
- Venue: Capitol Wrestling Center at WWE Performance Center

WWE event chronology
← Previous; SummerSlam	Next → Extreme Rules

NXT TakeOver chronology
← Previous; In Your House	Next → Final

NXT major events chronology
← Previous; TakeOver: In Your House	Next → WarGames

NXT TakeOver 36 was a 2021 professional wrestling pay-per-view (PPV) and livestreaming event produced by WWE, held for wrestlers from the promotion's NXT brand division. It was the 36th and final NXT TakeOver event and took place on August 22, 2021, from the Capitol Wrestling Center, hosted at the WWE Performance Center in Orlando, Florida.

The event was held during that year's SummerSlam weekend, but was held the night after SummerSlam, which was held on Saturday while TakeOver 36 was held on Sunday. This would also be NXT's final major event to be promoted from the Capitol Wrestling Center (CWC). The CWC was originally a bio-secure bubble that allowed WWE to hold NXT's events during the COVID-19 pandemic, but by this point, COVID restrictions had been lifted. In September, NXT was restructured as NXT 2.0 and the CWC name was discontinued, with all future events simply billed as being held at the Performance Center. The TakeOver series itself was discontinued along with the rebranding to NXT 2.0. It would in turn be NXT's last major event in which the brand was considered WWE's third main brand, as NXT reverted to being WWE's developmental brand with the restructuring to NXT 2.0.

Six matches were contested at the event, including one on the Kickoff pre-show. In the main event, Samoa Joe defeated Karrion Kross to win the NXT Championship for a record-breaking third time, which would ultimately be Joe's final WWE match. In the penultimate match, Kyle O'Reilly defeated Adam Cole by 2–1 in a two-out-of-three-falls match; this was also Cole's final WWE appearance. In other prominent matches, Ilja Dragunov defeated Walter by submission to win the NXT United Kingdom Championship ending Walter's record-setting reign at 870 days, and in the opening bout, Cameron Grimes defeated LA Knight to win the Million Dollar Championship with the added stipulation that if Grimes lost, Ted DiBiase would have become Knight's butler. Grimes subsequently became the final holder of the title before its retirement the following month.

== Production ==
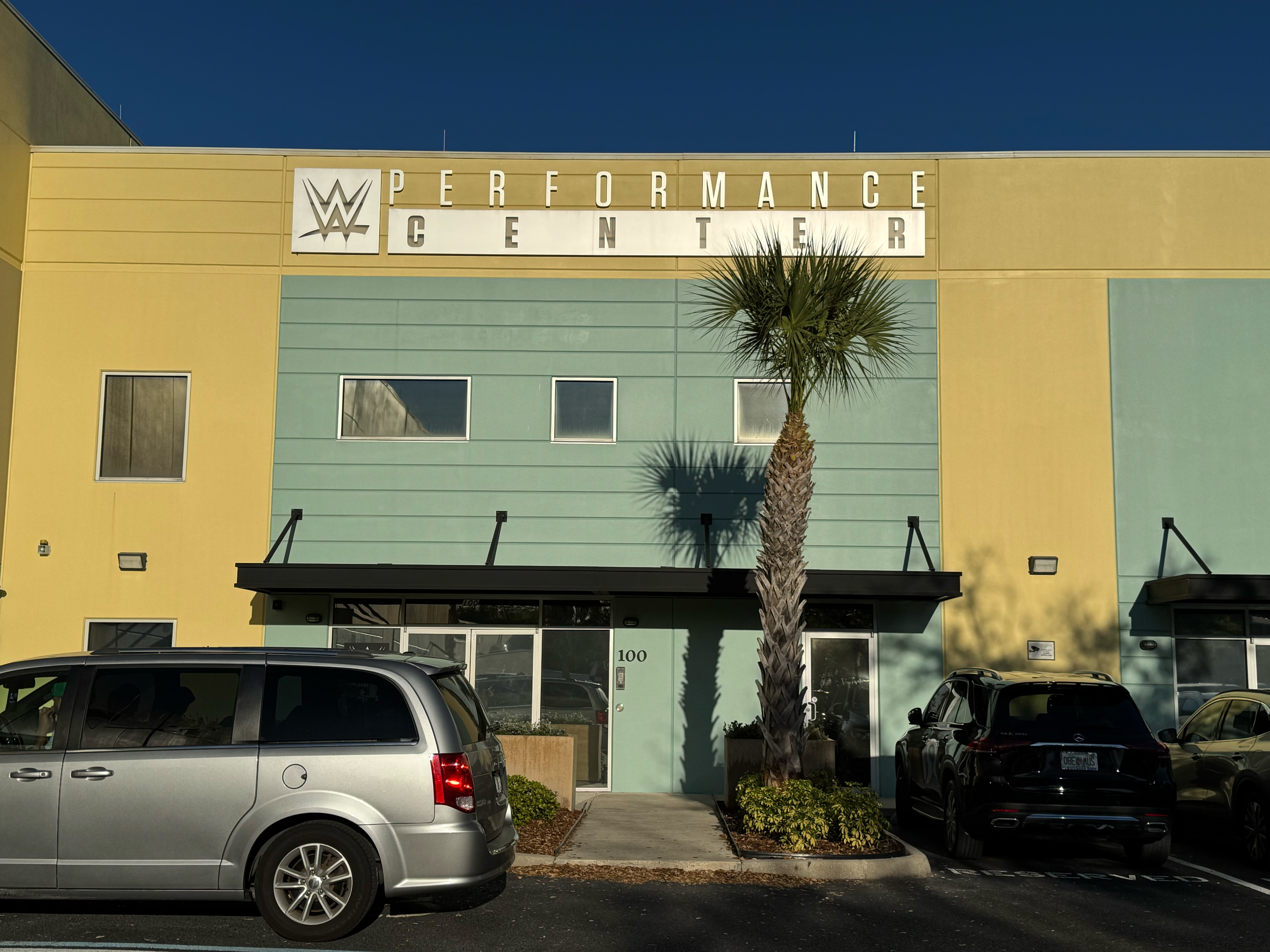
The 36th and final NXT TakeOver event was held at the Capitol Wrestling Center (CWC), which was hosted at the WWE Performance Center in Orlando, Florida. This was NXT's last pay-per-view and livestreaming event to be promoted from the CWC, as the name was discontinued in September with all subsequent events being promoted as simply from the Performance Center.

=== Background ===
TakeOver was a series of professional wrestling events that began in May 2014, as WWE's NXT brand held its second WWE Network-exclusive livestreaming event, billed as TakeOver. The "TakeOver" moniker subsequently became the branding for all of NXT's major events held periodically throughout the year. While originally exclusive to the WWE Network, TakeOver events also became available on traditional pay-per-view (PPV) beginning with TakeOver 31 in October 2020, and then also on SonyLIV in India and Peacock in the United States following the shutdown of the Indian version of the WWE Network in February and the American version in April.

Announced during the July 20, 2021, episode of NXT, the 36th TakeOver, simply titled as TakeOver 36, was scheduled to be held on Sunday, August 22, 2021, the night after SummerSlam for Raw and SmackDown. This in turn made TakeOver 36 the first TakeOver to air the night after one of WWE's main PPV and livestreaming events instead of the night before. Additionally, while Raw and SmackDown resumed live touring during the COVID-19 pandemic in mid-July, NXT continued to run its shows from the Capitol Wrestling Center, hosted at the WWE Performance Center in Orlando, Florida. The Capitol Wrestling Center was initially a bio-secure bubble similar to the WWE ThunderDome that had been used for Raw and SmackDown during the pandemic; however, the arena became the brand's home venue, with nearly all COVID-19 restrictions lifted with the previous TakeOver event, TakeOver: In Your House.

=== Storylines ===
The event comprised six matches, including one on the Kickoff pre-show, that resulted from scripted storylines. Results were predetermined by WWE's writers on the NXT brand, while storylines were produced on WWE's weekly television program, NXT.

On the October 29, 2020, episode of NXT UK, Walter defeated Ilja Dragunov to retain the NXT United Kingdom Championship. On the June 24, 2021, episode, Dragunov earned another opportunity to challenge Walter for the championship by defeating Rampage Brown and Joe Coffey in a triple threat match. The title match was then scheduled for the July 22 episode of NXT UK. A contract signing for the match was held during the July 15 episode, but later that same episode, Walter injured his hand in a backstage altercation. It was then announced that the championship match had been postponed. During the July 22 episode, NXT executive Paul "Triple H" Levesque, NXT UK producer Shawn Michaels, and NXT General Manager William Regal announced that the NXT United Kingdom Championship match would take place at TakeOver 36.

After being released from his WWE contract in April 2021, Samoa Joe re-signed with NXT that June. Joe made his formal return to the brand during the June 15 episode of NXT under the agreement that he would be the enforcer for NXT General Manager William Regal, as Regal had essentially lost control of the wrestlers. Additionally, Joe would not be an active wrestler and could not attack any member of the active roster unless provoked. That same episode, Joe came face-to-face with NXT Champion Karrion Kross. Over the following month, Kross would attempt to provoke Joe. During the July 13 episode, Joe served as the special guest referee for Kross's championship defense. After Kross retained the title, he attacked Joe. The following week, Joe called out Kross, who appeared backstage, showing that he had attacked Regal; Joe headed backstage but Kross retreated in a car when Joe got to Regal. On the July 27 episode, Regal had intended to fire Kross for his actions, but Joe had a different plan that Regal accepted. Joe resigned as Regal's enforcer, was reinstated as a member of the active roster, and was scheduled to face Kross for the NXT Championship at TakeOver 36, marking Joe's first match since February 2020.

At TakeOver: Portland in February 2020, Raquel González made her NXT debut, helping Dakota Kai defeat Tegan Nox. Over the following months, González would accompany Kai to her matches, forging an alliance and becoming Kai's "bodyguard". During the women's WarGames match at TakeOver: WarGames in December 2020, González picked up momentum after pinning reigning NXT Women's Champion Io Shirai. She then continued racking up victories with Kai by her side. Kai and González then won the inaugural women's Dusty Rhodes Tag Team Classic tournament, becoming the first-ever NXT Women's Tag Team Champions, although they lost the titles the same night they were awarded them. González then entered into a feud with Shirai and defeated her at Night 1 of TakeOver: Stand & Deliver to win the NXT Women's Championship. On the July 27 episode of NXT, González, with Kai by her side, issued an open challenge for the championship but no one answered. Kai then praised González but then attacked her from behind, subsequently turning González face in the process. Kai then said she would challenge González for the title, which was scheduled for TakeOver 36.

At TakeOver: In Your House, LA Knight defeated Cameron Grimes in a ladder match to win the vacant Million Dollar Championship that had been reintroduced by WWE Hall of Famer and "The Million Dollar Man", Ted DiBiase. On the following episode of NXT, DiBiase formally presented the Million Dollar Championship to Knight. After an emotional promo, Knight turned on and attacked DiBiase, who was saved by Grimes; in a video uploaded to WWE's YouTube channel, it was shown that Grimes had apologized to DiBiase following the match at In Your House. Knight then defeated Grimes in a rematch at NXT: The Great American Bash; as per the stipulation of the rematch, Grimes became Knight's personal butler. Grimes, however, would annoy Knight during this time. DiBiase then returned, encouraging Grimes to go after the Million Dollar Championship. During the August 10 episode of NXT, Knight agreed to defend the championship against Grimes at TakeOver 36 under the condition that if Knight won, DiBiase would replace Grimes as Knight's personal butler. Although Grimes was against it, DiBiase agreed to the terms.

Another notable feud heading into TakeOver 36 was the conflict between former Undisputed Era members Adam Cole and Kyle O'Reilly. It began at TakeOver: Vengeance Day, where Cole attacked O'Reilly at the end of the event. They faced each other in an unsanctioned match at Night 2 of TakeOver: Stand & Deliver, where O'Reilly won. At TakeOver: In Your House, O'Reilly and Cole failed to win the NXT Championship in a fatal five-way match. On the following episode of NXT, the two brawled backstage, and NXT General Manager William Regal announced a rematch between the two for NXT: The Great American Bash, where Cole won. On the July 27 episode, after Cole's match, O'Reilly attacked Cole, suplexing him onto the steel ring steps. Two weeks later, O'Reilly and Cole had a face-to-face confrontation where they agreed to a two out of three falls match for TakeOver 36. O'Reilly picked a singles match for the first fall, Cole picked a Street Fight for the second, and Regal picked a Steel Cage match for the final.

== Event ==
Other on-screen personnel
Role:	Name:
Commentators	Vic Joseph
Commentators	Wade Barrett
Commentators	Beth Phoenix
Spanish commentators	Carlos Cabrera
Spanish commentators	Marcelo Rodríguez
Ring announcer	Alicia Taylor
Referees	D.A. Brewer
Referees	Jessika Carr
Referees	Aja Smith
Interviewer	McKenzie Mitchell
Pre-show panel	Sam Roberts
Pre-show panel	McKenzie Mitchell
Pre-show panel	Rob Armstrong

=== Pre-show ===
During the Kickoff pre-show, Ridge Holland (accompanied by Pete Dunne) took on Trey Baxter. Holland quickly won the match after performing a headbutt and a brainbuster on Baxter. After the match, Holland challenged Timothy Thatcher to a match on the upcoming episode of NXT.

=== Preliminary matches ===
In the opening match, LA Knight defended the Million Dollar Championship against his butler Cameron Grimes with a stipulation that Ted DiBiase would become Knight's butler if he won. Grimes tried to win with the Dream Street, but Knight escaped. Knight tried to leave with the title, but DiBiase stopped him and threw the title into the ring. While the referee was trying to take the title away from Grimes, DiBiase applied the Dream Street on Knight and threw him back into the ring. Grimes performed a Cave In on Knight to win the title, becoming free from being Knight's butler, and keeping DiBiase from becoming the butler.

Next, Raquel González defended the NXT Women's Championship against Dakota Kai. Kai performed a Codebreaker on González for a nearfall. In the end, Kai went for a Yakuza Kick, but González caught the foot and dragged Kai to the top rope with her and performed a Chingona Bomb off the top rope to retain the title. Afterwards, NXT UK's Kay Lee Ray returned and confronted González from the stage.

Then, Walter defended the NXT United Kingdom Championship against Ilja Dragunov. Dragunov exerted control with a headlock and later a keylock, but Walter placed Dragunov on the top rope, chopped him to the floor, and powerbombed him onto the ring apron. Both men exchanged chops, forearms, lariats, knees, kicks and suplexes. Walter countered Dragunov's Torpedo Moscow and performed a sleeper suplex, but Dragunov continued with a Torpedo Moscow to the back of Walter's head, and then a regular Torpedo Moscow for a nearfall. Walter performed a shotgun dropkick and a powerbomb for a nearfall, then another powerbomb and a diving splash for another nearfall. Dragunov escaped Walter's sleeper hold and performed a diving headbutt. Dragunov overwhelmed Walter with strikes and sleeper holds, with Walter submitting on the third sleeper hold application, ending Walter's 870-day reign as champion.

In the penultimate match, Adam Cole took on Kyle O'Reilly in a Three Stages of Hell match - a type of a two-out-of-three falls match where each fall is contested under different rules - in what was called "The Undisputed Finale". The first fall was a Singles match. O'Reilly quickly won the first fall after countering a Panama Sunrise into a roll-up. The second fall was a Street Fight. O'Reilly sat Cole in a steel chair, placed a trash can over his head, and performed a running dropkick off the apron. As O'Reilly went to the top rope, Cole kicked him off and Kyle hit his ribs on the apron. The two fought to the stage where Cole applied a guillotine choke, but O'Reilly escaped and threw Cole off the stage into the plexiglass. As O'Reilly went for the top rope knee drop, Cole threw O'Reilly onto two standing chairs and performed a Last Shot to win the second fall. The final fall was a Steel Cage match. Cole threw O'Reilly into the cage multiple times and Kyle would catapult Cole into the cage as well. Cole had a pair of handcuffs and attached O'Reilly to the top rope. Cole performed a superkick, but O'Reilly grabbed the foot on a second attempt and applied a heel hook, forcing Cole to submit to win the match. Afterwards, Cole was helped to the back by officials. This was Cole's final WWE appearance, as his WWE contract expired shortly after the event. Cole made his All Elite Wrestling (AEW) debut at All Out.

=== Main event ===
In the main event, Karrion Kross defended the NXT Championship against Samoa Joe. Joe performed a Suicide Dive on Kross on the outside. Joe performed a Senton off the top rope for a nearfall. Joe applied the Coquina Clutch, but Kross escaped. Kross applied the Kross Jacket, but Joe escaped as well. Joe performed a Uranage and placed Kross on the top rope. Joe performed a Muscle Buster on Kross to win the title for a record-setting third time.

== Reception ==
The event was met with critical acclaim. Kevin Pantoja of 411Mania gave the entire event an 8.5 out of 10 ratings and gave the Walter vs. Ilja Dragunov match a perfect 5 star out of 5 ratings, with the reviewer declaring Walter as "the best wrestler on the planet". Kevin Berge of Bleacher Report praised all the matches except the Ridge Holland vs. Trey Baxter which was graded C, their lowest graded match from the event. Raquel González vs. Dakota Kai, Walter vs. Ilja Dragunov, and Kyle O'Reilly vs. Adam Cole were particularly praised, with Walter vs. Ilja Dragunov being awarded the highest grading of A+ and being called the potential match of the year. Walter vs. Ilja Dragunov became the highest-rated WWE match of all times according to Cagematch.net, with a rating of 9.69 out of 10, surpassing the previous record held by Shawn Michaels vs. The Undertaker at WrestleMania 25. Fans all over the world took to Twitter and praised the Walter vs. Ilja Dragunov match. Dave Meltzer of the Wrestling Observer Newsletter praised the event and gave the Ilja Dragunov vs. Walter a rating of 5.25 stars.

== Aftermath ==
This would be Karrion Kross's final NXT match. Prior to TakeOver 36, Kross debuted on Raw on July 19, where he lost to Jeff Hardy in under two minutes. On the Raw after TakeOver 36, Kross was moved to the Raw brand, where he performed without Scarlett and wore a gladiator helmet and suspenders during his entrance. This attire and character direction was criticized, with many deeming those changes unnecessary and poorly thought out. On November 4, Kross and Scarlett were released from their WWE contracts, although they did return on the August 5, 2022, episode of SmackDown.

This would be Samoa Joe's final WWE match. On September 12, Joe relinquished the NXT Championship due to what WWE reported as an unspecified injury, and then was released from his WWE contract on January 6, 2022. In March 2022, Joe stated that the real reason he relinquished the title was because he tested positive for COVID-19, as well as Vince McMahon wanting to change the overall direction of NXT with the rebranding to NXT 2.0 and reverting to being WWE's developmental brand. After the NXT Championship was vacated, a fatal four-way match for the vacant title was announced for the September 14 episode of NXT. The match was won by Tommaso Ciampa, making him a two-time NXT Champion.

Ridge Holland and Timothy Thatcher had their match on the following episode of NXT, where Holland was victorious. After the match, Holland attacked Thatcher, but Tommaso Ciampa made the save. However, Oney Lorcan, Danny Burch, and Pete Dunne overpowered Thatcher and Ciampa, ending the attack with Dunne striking Thatcher in the throat. This ended up being Thatcher's final WWE appearance, as he was released from his WWE contract on January 5, 2022.

Also on NXT, Ted DiBiase and Cameron Grimes celebrated the latter's Million Dollar Championship win. DiBiase stated that it was time for them to go "to the moon". Later that night, Grimes gave the title back to Ted DiBiase, who said that Grimes should keep it, but DiBiase actually kept the title and instead gave Grimes a replica. The next month, the title was removed from WWE.com with Grimes recognized as a former champion, thus deactivating the title with Grimes recognized as the final champion.

TakeOver 36 would be the final TakeOver event. In September, the NXT brand went through a restructuring, being rebranded as "NXT 2.0", reverting to a developmental brand for WWE. The Capitol Wrestling Center name was also phased out, with subsequent events just being billed as held from the Performance Center. These changes went into effect beginning with the September 14 episode, with the program also renamed as NXT 2.0. In October, it was speculated that the company may end the TakeOver series as another TakeOver event was not scheduled for 2021 after TakeOver 36. On November 9, 2021, NXT's next PPV and livestreaming event was announced as WarGames to be held on December 5. WarGames was previously an annual subseries of TakeOver events held from 2017 to 2020, however, the announcement confirmed that the event would not be a TakeOver event, thus ending the TakeOver series.

== Results ==
No.	Results	Stipulations	Times
1^{P}	Ridge Holland (with Pete Dunne) defeated Trey Baxter by pinfall	Singles match	1:45
2	Cameron Grimes (with Ted DiBiase) defeated LA Knight (c) by pinfall	Singles match for the Million Dollar Championship; Had Grimes lost, DiBiase would have become Knight's butler.	16:31
3	Raquel González (c) defeated Dakota Kai by pinfall	Singles match for the NXT Women's Championship	12:24
4	Ilja Dragunov defeated Walter (c) by submission	Singles match for the NXT United Kingdom Championship	22:03
5	Kyle O'Reilly defeated Adam Cole 2–1	"The Undisputed Finale" Two-out-of-three-falls match: Fall 1: Traditional Wrestling (won by O'Reilly via pinfall); Fall 2: Street Fight (won by Cole via pinfall); Fall 3: Steel Cage (won by O'Reilly via submission)	25:20
6	Samoa Joe defeated Karrion Kross (c) by pinfall	Singles match for the NXT Championship	12:24
(c) / – the champion(s) heading into the match; P / – the match was broadcast on the pre-show
