= NXT TakeOver: WarGames (2019) =

WWE Network event

- Promotional poster featuring various NXT wrestlers
- Promotion: WWE
- Brand: NXT
- Date: November 23, 2019
- City: Rosemont, Illinois
- Venue: Allstate Arena
- Attendance: 10,500

WWE event chronology
← Previous; Crown Jewel	Next → Survivor Series

NXT TakeOver chronology
← Previous; Toronto	Next → Portland

NXT TakeOver: WarGames chronology
← Previous; 2018	Next → 2020

The 2019 NXT TakeOver: WarGames was a professional wrestling livestreaming event produced by WWE, held exclusively for wrestlers from the promotion's NXT brand division. It was the 27th NXT TakeOver event and the third annual NXT WarGames. It took place on November 23, 2019, at the Allstate Arena in the Chicago suburb of Rosemont, Illinois as part of that year's Survivor Series weekend and aired exclusively on the WWE Network. The event centered on the WarGames match, a type of roofless steel cage match that surrounds two rings placed side by side and is contested by teams of multiple wrestlers; the first team to score a pinfall or submission wins while escaping the cage is a forfeit.

Five matches were contested at the event, including one on the Pre-Show. There were two WarGames matches, including the first ever women's version. The main event was the men's WarGames match in which Team Ciampa (Tommaso Ciampa, Keith Lee, Dominik Dijakovic, and Kevin Owens) defeated The Undisputed Era (Adam Cole, Bobby Fish, Kyle O'Reilly, and Roderick Strong). The event's opening bout was the inaugural women's WarGames match, which saw Team Ripley (Rhea Ripley, Candice LeRae, Tegan Nox, and Dakota Kai) defeat Team Baszler (Shayna Baszler, Bianca Belair, Io Shirai, and Kay Lee Ray).

This was the first TakeOver held following NXT's recognition as one of WWE's three main brands in September, which it maintained until September 2021 when it reverted back to being a developmental brand. It was also the second TakeOver event in which the NXT Championship was not defended, after Respect in October 2015, and was the first which saw no title defenses on the card. This was also the third TakeOver event held at the Allstate Arena, after the TakeOver: Chicago events in 2017 and 2018. This would also be NXT's last WarGames event to be held in November as a support show for Survivor Series as the event was moved to December in 2020.

== Production ==
=== Background ===
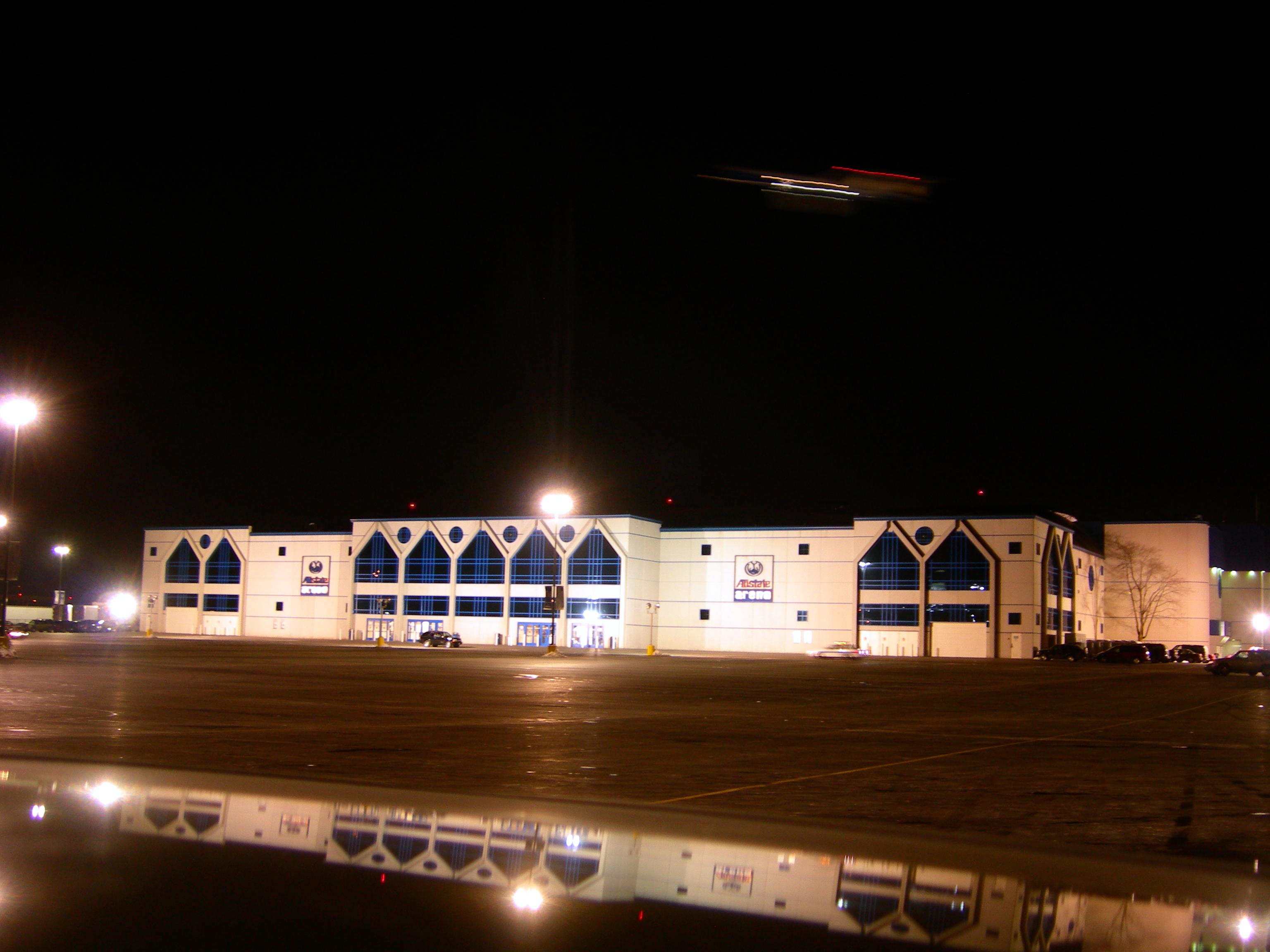
The 27th NXT TakeOver event, and third annual NXT WarGames, was held at the Allstate Arena in the Chicago suburb of Rosemont, Illinois, which was the third TakeOver at the venue, after the TakeOver: Chicago events in 2017 and 2018

TakeOver was a series of professional wrestling events that began in May 2014, as WWE's developmental brand, NXT, held its second WWE Network-exclusive livestreaming event, billed as TakeOver. The "TakeOver" moniker subsequently became the branding for all of NXT's major events held periodically throughout the year. WarGames was an annual subseries of TakeOver events that centered on the WarGames match and were held as support shows for WWE's annual Survivor Series for the main roster. Announced on November 19, 2018, the third WarGames event was scheduled for Saturday, November 23, 2019, at the Allstate Arena in the Chicago suburb of Rosemont, Illinois. It was the 27th TakeOver event and was held as a support show for that year's Survivor Series at the same venue. This was also the first TakeOver held following NXT's recognition as one of WWE's three main brands in September.

NXT previously held an annual subseries of TakeOver events titled TakeOver: Chicago, both of which were held at the Allstate Arena in 2017 and 2018. Although the 2019 WarGames was the third TakeOver held at the venue, it was not considered as part of the TakeOver: Chicago subseries as it was part of the WarGames subseries.

The WarGames match is a type of roofless steel cage match that surrounds two rings placed side by side. It is contested by two or three teams composed of three to six members each. One member from each team starts in the cage, and every couple of minutes, another team member enters in a staggered format until all participants have entered. Once all participants are in the cage, the match officially begins and the first team to score a pinfall or submission wins, while escaping the cage is a forfeit.

=== Storylines ===
The event comprised five matches, including one on the Pre-Show, that resulted from scripted storylines. Results were predetermined by WWE's writers on the NXT brand, while storylines were produced on WWE's weekly television program, NXT.

On the October 30 episode of NXT, a brawl occurred with all the women on the roster after the conclusion of a WWE Women's Tag Team Championship match. This prompted NXT general manager William Regal to schedule the first ever women's WarGames match with Rhea Ripley and NXT Women's Champion Shayna Baszler being captain for their respective teams. On the November 6 episode of The Bump, Ripley chose Candice LeRae and Tegan Nox, while Baszler chose Bianca Belair and Io Shirai. That same night on NXT, Ripley chose Mia Yim as the final pick for her team after Yim saved her team from a brawl, following the conclusion of a match between Baszler and Dakota Kai. On the November 13 episode, a ladder match between Yim and Shirai was held to determine which team would get the WarGames advantage. NXT UK Women's Champion Kay Lee Ray interfered, allowing Shirai to win, and subsequently joined Baszler's team. However, during the WarGames Pre-Show, Yim was attacked backstage by an unknown person and was unable to compete in the match. As a result, Ripley had to choose Kai as her replacement.

On the October 30 episode of NXT, NXT Tag Team Champions The Undisputed Era (Bobby Fish and Kyle O'Reilly) defeated Matt Riddle and Keith Lee. Afterwards, The Undisputed Era (including Adam Cole and Roderick Strong) proceeded to attack Lee and Riddle, before Tommaso Ciampa appeared. The following week, a men's WarGames match was scheduled between Team Ciampa (Ciampa, Riddle, Lee, and a partner of their choosing) and The Undisputed Era. On the November 13 episode, following a match between Lee and Strong, The Undisputed Era attacked Ciampa and Lee until Dominik Dijakovic appeared. Dijakovic offered to be the fourth member of the team, which Ciampa accepted. Later that night, Riddle left Ciampa's team after being scheduled to face Finn Bálor. On the November 20 episode, Cole defeated Dijakovic in a ladder match to gain the WarGames advantage.

On the November 13 episode of NXT, Finn Bálor insulted the NXT roster as "all boys who can't take a beating", specifically mentioning Johnny Gargano and Matt Riddle. Riddle attacked Bálor, who retreated. Later that night, Riddle assisted his then-WarGames partners Keith Lee and Tommaso Ciampa against their scheduled opponents, The Undisputed Era. However, Bálor appeared and attacked Riddle. As a result, a match between the two was scheduled for TakeOver: WarGames.

On the October 16 episode of NXT, Pete Dunne performed a finger snap on Killian Dain before Dunne's scheduled match against Damian Priest. Priest later defeated Dunne after a low blow. A rematch between Dunne and Priest was scheduled on the November 6 episode, where Dunne won by submission. Following the match, Dain attacked both Dunne and Priest. On the November 13 episode, a match between Dunne and Dain was scheduled on the night. However, Priest attacked Dain and subsequently, a brawl occurred between the three. On November 19, a triple threat match between Dunne, Priest, and Dain was scheduled for TakeOver: WarGames, with the winner receiving an NXT Championship match against champion Adam Cole at Survivor Series the following night.

On November 22, a match between Isaiah "Swerve" Scott and Angel Garza was scheduled for the TakeOver: WarGames Pre-Show.

== Event ==
Other on-screen personnel
Role:	Name:
Commentators	Mauro Ranallo
Commentators	Nigel McGuinness
Commentators	Beth Phoenix
Spanish commentators	Carlos Cabrera
Spanish commentators	Marcelo Rodríguez
Ring announcer	Alicia Taylor
Referees	Drake Wuertz
Referees	Darryl Sharma
Referees	Jessika Carr
Referees	D.A. Brewer
Pre-show panel	Charly Caruso
Pre-show panel	Sam Roberts
Pre-show panel	Pat McAfee

=== Pre-Show ===
During the TakeOver: WarGames Pre-Show, Isaiah "Swerve" Scott faced Angel Garza. Garza performed the Wing Clipper on Scott to win.

Previously, Mia Yim was attacked by an unknown assailant and was ruled unable to compete in WarGames. Rhea Ripley chose Dakota Kai as her replacement.

=== Preliminary matches ===
The first match was the WarGames match involving Team Ripley (Rhea Ripley, Candice LeRae, Tegan Nox, and Dakota Kai) and Team Baszler (NXT Women's Champion Shayna Baszler, Bianca Belair, Io Shirai, and NXT UK Women's Champion Kay Lee Ray). LeRae and Shirai began. After five minutes, Belair entered, followed by Ripley and Ray. As Kai was scheduled to enter, she attacked her teammate Nox; Kai would leave and Nox was ruled unable to compete. Baszler entered last. Shirai performed a Moonsault off the cage on LeRae and Belair, and Ripley struck Ray with a trash can. Baszler applied the Kirifuda Clutch, but Ripley used handcuffs on Bazler. Ripley performed the Riptide through two chairs to win. Despite neither of them competing in the match, both Nox and Kai were announced as part of Team Ripley.

Next, Pete Dunne, Damian Priest, and Killian Dain competed for the number one contendership to the NXT Championship at Survivor Series. Dain performed a Running Senton on Priest while Dunne had Dain locked in a sleeper hold, and Dunne pinned Priest to win.

In the penultimate match, Matt Riddle faced Finn Bálor. Bálor performed a 1916 on Riddle to win.

=== Main event ===
In the main event, Team Ciampa (Tommaso Ciampa, Keith Lee, Dominic Dijakovic, and an unknown partner) faced The Undisputed Era (NXT Champion Adam Cole, NXT Tag Team Champions Bobby Fish and Kyle O'Reilly, and NXT North American Champion Roderick Strong) in WarGames. Ciampa and Strong began. After five minutes, O'Reilly entered, being followed by Dijakovic, Fish, Lee and Cole. Ciampa pushed Cole through a table against the barrier. Kevin Owens was revealed as the unknown partner and entered last. Owens performed a Stunner on Cole but Strong avoided the pinfall at a two count. Cole performed a Panama Sunrise on the steel platform on Owens. Dijakovic performed a Chokeslam through a table on Strong, Owens performed a Frog Splash through a table on O'Reilly (who was applying a triangle submission on Dijakovic to counter a second Chokeslam), and Lee performed a Super Spirit Bomb through a table on Fish. Ciampa performed an Air Raid Crash off the cage through two tables on Cole to win.

== Reception ==
The event received critical acclaim among wrestling fans and journalists.

Larry Csonka and Kevin Pantoja of 411Mania gave TakeOver: WarGames a score of 8 out of 10. Csonka stated "NXT TakeOver WarGames 2019 was an overall great show, with the two WarGames matches delivering and offering up nothing bad on the card, which flew by at just two-hours including the pre-show, and booking that set up a lot of matches for the future".

Erik Beaston of Bleacher Report gave the overall show a strongly positive review. He graded the kickoff show bout between Garza and Scott with a B, the women's WarGames match a grade of A+, the triple threat match between Dunne, Priest, and Dain a B, the singles match between Riddle and Balor a B+, and gave an A+ to the men's WarGames match.

Dave Meltzer of the Wrestling Observer Newsletter awarded the Scott vs. Garza match on the kickoff show 2.75 out of 5 stars, the women's WarGames match 4.25 stars, the triple threat match featuring Pete Dunne, Damien Priest and Killian Dain 3.5 stars, the singles match between Matt Riddle and Finn Balor 4 stars and the men's WarGames match 4.5 stars.

Brent Brookhouse of CBS Sports gave grades of A and A− respectively for both the WarGames matches, a B for the triple threat match between Pete Dunne, Killian Dain and Damien Priest, a B+ for Matt Riddle vs. Finn Balor and a grade of A− for the overall show stating "Saturday's TakeOver: WarGames 3 card from Chicago -- one night before Survivor Series at Allstate Arena -- delivered big on all fronts. When the main complaints coming out of a show mainly focus on the two eponymous matches being a bit much for a single night and one very good match going a few minutes too long, you know the product delivered what NXT fans have come to expect from TakeOver events".

Brian Mazique of Forbes gave grades of B+ for the pre-show match between Isaiah "Swerve" Scott and Angel Garza, an A+ and A respectively for both the WarGames matches, an A for Pete Dunne vs. Killian Dain vs. Damien Priest, a B for Matt Riddle vs. Finn Balor and gave the overall show an A, stating "War Games delivered. The fact that it was so interesting without a title on the line made it all the more impressive".

The event itself would later win the NXT Year-End Award for TakeOver of the Year.

== Aftermath ==
After the show, in a Facebook video alongside Triple H, Rhea Ripley selected Candice LeRae, Bianca Belair, Io Shirai, and NXT UK superstar Toni Storm as part of the NXT team for the women's 5-on-5-on-5 survivor series match. During the Survivor Series Kickoff pre-show the following day, Shawn Michaels announced Tommaso Ciampa, Keith Lee, Damian Priest, Matt Riddle, and WWE United Kingdom Champion Walter as part of the NXT team for the men's 5-on-5-on-5 survivor series match. At the event, NXT won brand supremacy over Raw and SmackDown after Ripley's team, Roderick Strong, and Shayna Baszler each won their interbrand matches, while Lio Rush retained the NXT Cruiserweight Championship against representatives from Raw and SmackDown; in one of the three non-interbrand matches on the card, Adam Cole retained the NXT Championship against Pete Dunne.

On Raw the following Monday, as part of a larger "town hall" discussing Raw's performance during Survivor Series, Seth Rollins chastised Kevin Owens for participating in the WarGames match with Team Ciampa, questioning his loyalty to Raw and mockingly referring to him as "Mr. NXT". In response, Owens performed a stunner and challenged him to a match later on the show. The match would end in a disqualification win for Owens after former NXT Tag Team Champions AOP (Akam and Rezar) (who Rollins chastised earlier for not participating at Survivor Series at all) attacked Owens. Rollins then performed two Stomps on Owens.

Following Tommaso Ciampa's teammates Dominik Dijakovic and Keith Lee's performance in the WarGames match (with Team Ciampa winning) and also Lee's performance in the men's Survivor Series elimination match, William Regal announced that both Dijakovic and Lee would have their opportunity to challenge The Undisputed Era's Bobby Fish and Kyle O'Reilly for the NXT Tag Team Championship on November 27 episode of NXT. Fish, however, ended up sustaining an injury and was replaced by fellow member Roderick Strong where Strong and O'Reilly defeated Dijakovic and Lee to retain the titles.

On the November 27 episode of NXT, the entire roster (including NXT UK) celebrated their brand's victory over Raw and SmackDown at Survivor Series only for The Undisputed Era (NXT Champion Adam Cole, Kyle O'Reilly, Bobby Fish, and Roderick Strong) to interrupt. Cole stated that the only reason why NXT brand were dominant was due to their stable and not because of the roster. Cole also mentioned that the roster did absolutely nothing on the weekend. Ciampa reminded Cole that it was his team that defeated The Undisputed Era at WarGames and warned them that their days of holding their championship belts were numbered, with Ciampa focusing on Cole's NXT Championship. Finn Bálor then interrupted and stated that Ciampa was standing in his way. In response, Ciampa issued a challenge to Balor, which the latter agreed. During the match, Bálor defeated Ciampa, due to interference by Cole. Following the match, Bálor performed a Pele Kick on Cole. The following week, Bálor, Keith Lee, and Dominik Dijakovic defeated The Undisputed Era (Cole, Strong, and O'Reilly). Afterwards, it was announced that a triple threat match between Lee, Ciampa, and Bálor to determine the new number one contender for the NXT Championship would take place on the December 11 episode, which was won by Bálor. On the December 18 episode, Cole retained against Bálor due to a distraction from a returning Johnny Gargano. Afterwards, Gargano attacked Bálor with a chair, but Bálor was able to retreat. On the January 8, 2020, episode, Gargano addressed what Bálor was capable of when Bálor interrupted. Bálor told Gargano that if he wanted the moment, he would get it at TakeOver: Portland, if he could make it there. The match was made official the following week.

Meanwhile, Tommaso Ciampa continued to set his sights on Adam Cole's NXT Championship. A contract signing for their title match at TakeOver: Portland took place on the January 29, 2020, episode of NXT. Ciampa fought off interference from Cole's Undisputed Era stablemates, Roderick Strong, Bobby Fish, and Kyle O'Reilly, with a steel pipe. He then spray-painted an "X" on a table and powerbombed Cole through it. Ciampa then signed the contract, making the match official.

Following Dakota Kai's ambush on Tegan Nox at WarGames, Kai faced Candice LeRae on the November 27 episode of NXT, where Kai attacked LeRae with Nox's knee brace, thus LeRae won by disqualification. As Kai attempted to attack LeRae with the chair, Rhea Ripley came out to LeRae's aid. The following week, Kai revealed that she was the one who attacked Mia Yim backstage at the TakeOver: WarGames Pre-Show. Yim then viciously attacked Kai. A match between Kai and Yim took place on the December 11 episode, where Kai won. Nox made her return on the January 15, 2020, episode of NXT, where she took part in a battle royal to determine the number one contender for the NXT Women's Championship, but was eliminated by Kai, who attacked her with the knee brace afterwards. The two had a match two weeks later, where Nox won after interference from LeRae. On February 1, a street fight between Nox and Kai was made official for TakeOver: Portland.

Rhea Ripley had a face-to-face confrontation with Shayna Baszler, and congratulating her for defeating Becky Lynch and Bayley at Survivor Series. Ripley then reminded Baszler that her team defeated Baszler's team at WarGames and then issued a challenge to Baszler for the NXT Women's Championship. The following week, while Ripley was watching Yim get her revenge on Kai, Baszler choked her out with the Kirifuda Clutch. It was then announced that their title match would take place on the December 18 episode of NXT, where Ripley defeated Baszler to win the title, also ending Baszler's reign at 416 days, the first time the title changed hands in the Reiwa era.

This was the final NXT WarGames to air exclusively on the WWE Network, as starting with TakeOver 31 in October 2020, the TakeOver events also became available on traditional pay-per-view. This was also the last NXT WarGames to be held in November as a support show for Survivor Series, as the event was moved to December in 2020.

== Results ==
No.	Results	Stipulations	Times
1^{P}	Angel Garza defeated Isaiah "Swerve" Scott by pinfall	Singles match	7:35
2	Team Ripley (Rhea Ripley, Candice LeRae, Tegan Nox, and Dakota Kai) (Note: Mia Yim was originally meant to be in the match but, was attacked backstage and was replaced with Kai. Nox and Kai did not take part in the match after Kai attacked Nox, resulting in Nox being taken out of the match and Kai escorted from ringside, forcing Team Ripley to compete at a 2-on-4 disadvantage. However, both Nox and Kai were announced as winners.) defeated Team Baszler (Shayna Baszler, Bianca Belair, Io Shirai, and Kay Lee Ray) by pinfall	WarGames match	27:24
3	Pete Dunne defeated Damian Priest and Killian Dain by pinfall	Triple threat match to determine the #1 contender for the NXT Championship at Survivor Series	19:56
4	Finn Bálor defeated Matt Riddle by pinfall	Singles match	14:21
5	Team Ciampa (Tommaso Ciampa, Keith Lee, Dominik Dijakovic, and Kevin Owens) defeated The Undisputed Era (Adam Cole, Bobby Fish, Kyle O'Reilly, and Roderick Strong) by pinfall	WarGames match	38:26
P / – the match was broadcast on the pre-show
