= NXT WarGames (2021) =

WWE pay-per-view and livestreaming event

- Promotional poster featuring various NXT wrestlers
- Promotion: WWE
- Brand: NXT 2.0
- Date: December 5, 2021
- City: Orlando, Florida
- Venue: WWE Performance Center

WWE event chronology
← Previous; Survivor Series	Next → Day 1

NXT WarGames chronology
← Previous; 2020	Next → Final

NXT major events chronology
← Previous; TakeOver 36	Next → Stand & Deliver

The 2021 NXT WarGames was a professional wrestling pay-per-view (PPV) and livestreaming event produced by WWE, held exclusively for wrestlers from the promotion's developmental brand, NXT 2.0. It was the fifth annual and final NXT WarGames event, and was NXT's first major event held following its rebranding as NXT 2.0 in September, which reverted it to being WWE's developmental brand. It took place on December 5, 2021, at NXT's home venue, the WWE Performance Center in Orlando, Florida. The event centered on the WarGames match, a type of roofless steel cage match that surrounds two rings placed side by side and is contested by teams of multiple wrestlers; the first team to score a pinfall or submission wins while escaping the cage is a forfeit.

There were five matches scheduled on the event's card, as well as one dark match that occurred before the live broadcast. There were two WarGames matches, one each for the men and women. The main event was the men's WarGames match where Team 2.0 (Bron Breakker, Carmelo Hayes, Grayson Waller, and Tony D'Angelo), representing the NXT 2.0 era of wrestlers, defeated Team Black & Gold (Johnny Gargano, LA Knight, Pete Dunne, and Tommaso Ciampa), representing the old guard of NXT before its rebranding to NXT 2.0. The women's WarGames match opened the show and saw the team of Cora Jade, Io Shirai, Kay Lee Ray, and Raquel González defeat the team of Toxic Attraction (Mandy Rose, Gigi Dolin, and Jacy Jayne) and Dakota Kai.

This was NXT's first PPV and livestreaming event held following the discontinuation of the NXT TakeOver series, subsequently being NXT's first WarGames event to not be held as a TakeOver event, as the events from 2017 to 2020 were held as an annual subseries of TakeOvers titled "TakeOver: WarGames". It was subsequently NXT's first event outside of the weekly NXT program (which was also rebranded as NXT 2.0) to not be promoted under the TakeOver name since Halftime Heat in February 2019 as well as NXT's first major event to not be held as a TakeOver since the brand's inaugural livestreaming event Arrival in February 2014. It was also NXT's first major event in which the Performance Center was not referred to as the Capitol Wrestling Center, which was phased out with the restructuring to NXT 2.0 and due to all COVID-19 restrictions being lifted. This would also be NXT's last event to feature the WarGames match as the following year, the concept was moved to the main roster as part of Survivor Series with NXT's WarGames event being replaced by Deadline.

This would be NXT's last major event to air on traditional PPV, as in 2022, WWE shifted to only broadcasting NXT's major events on its livestreaming platforms. This was also the first and only NXT WarGames to livestream on SonyLIV in India and Peacock in the United States following the shutdown of the Indian version of the WWE Network in February and the American version in April. It would also be WWE's last PPV and livestreaming event to carry the term "pay-per-view" as WWE began to use the term "premium live event" for these major events, including NXT's, beginning with Day 1 the following month.

== Production ==
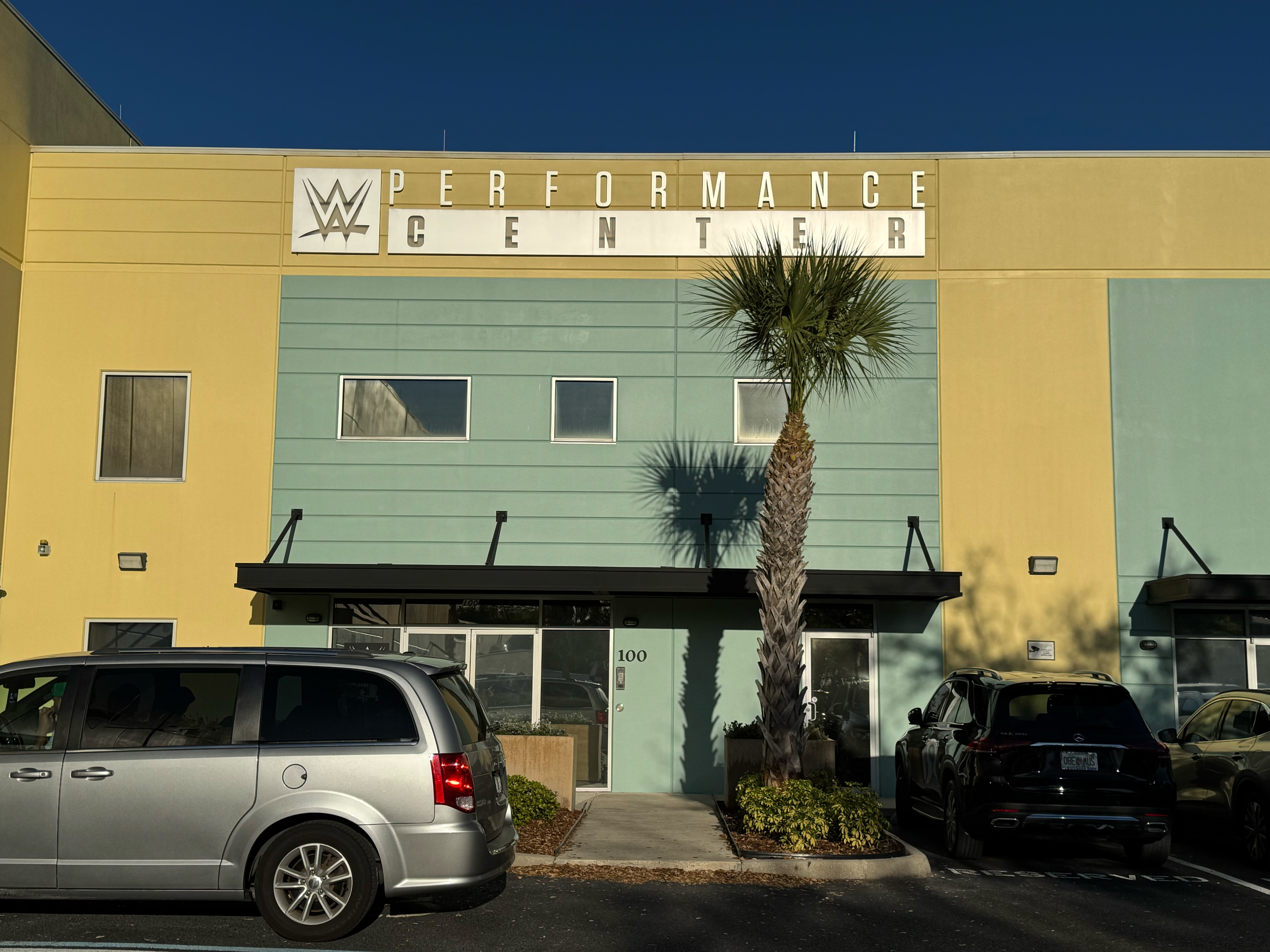
The fifth annual and final NXT WarGames event was held at NXT's home venue, the WWE Performance Center in Orlando, Florida. This was NXT's first pay-per-view and livestreaming event in which the venue was not referred to as the Capitol Wrestling Center, as the name was phased out with NXT's rebranding as NXT 2.0 in September and due to all COVID-19 restrictions being lifted.

=== Background ===
Since May 2014, WWE had held a series of periodic professional wrestling events for its NXT brand titled TakeOver, which were originally livestreamed exclusively on the WWE Network before also becoming available on traditional pay-per-view (PPV) in October 2020. WarGames was an annual subseries of TakeOver events that began in 2017, based around the WarGames match; it was originally held as a support show for the main roster's Survivor Series event in November before moving to December in 2020. In September 2019, NXT began to be regarded as WWE's third main brand with that year's TakeOver: WarGames being the first TakeOver held following this recognition, but in September 2021, NXT went through a restructuring and was rebranded as "NXT 2.0", reverting to a developmental brand for WWE. In October, it was speculated that the company may end the TakeOver series as another TakeOver event was not scheduled for 2021 after TakeOver 36 in August.

On November 9, 2021, NXT's fifth WarGames event was announced to be held on Sunday, December 5, 2021, at the brand's home venue, the WWE Performance Center in Orlando, Florida. The announcement confirmed that the event would not be a TakeOver event, thus marking NXT's first PPV and livestreaming event held following TakeOver's discontinuation, as well as the first non-TakeOver to air on any of these broadcast outlets since Halftime Heat in February 2019, and also NXT's first major event to not be held as a TakeOver since the brand's inaugural livestreaming event Arrival in February 2014. It was also the brand's first PPV and livestreaming event held following its rebranding as "NXT 2.0", which also phased out the Capitol Wrestling Center name for the Performance Center as all COVID-19 restrictions had been lifted. On the day of the event's announcement, WWE had originally made a post on Twitter referring to the event as "TakeOver: WarGames"; however, the tweet was quickly deleted and reposted omitting the "TakeOver" title.

The WarGames match is a type of roofless steel cage match that surrounds two rings placed side by side. It is contested by two or three teams composed of three to six members each. One member from each team starts in the cage, and every couple of minutes, another team member enters in a staggered format until all participants have entered. Once all participants are in the cage, the match officially begins and the first team to score a pinfall or submission wins, while escaping the cage is a forfeit.

=== Broadcast outlets ===
The event was broadcast on traditional PPV worldwide. It was also available to livestream on Peacock in the United States, SonyLIV in India, and the WWE Network everywhere else. This was NXT's first WarGames to livestream on SonyLIV and Peacock, following the shutdown of the Indian version of the WWE Network in February and the American version in April.

=== Storylines ===
The card included matches that resulted from scripted storylines. Results were predetermined by WWE's writers on the NXT brand, while storylines were produced on WWE's weekly television program, NXT 2.0.

At NXT: Halloween Havoc on October 26, Raquel González lost the NXT Women's Championship to Mandy Rose after interference from Dakota Kai. A match between González and Kai was later scheduled for the November 16 episode of NXT, which ended in a disqualification win for González after interference from Toxic Attraction (Rose, Gigi Dolin, and Jacy Jayne). After the match, Cora Jade attacked Dolin and Jayne, only for Rose to overpower her. Io Shirai then grabbed a crutch from the injured Zoey Stark and attacked Kai and Toxic Attraction with it, sending them retreating. Shirai, Jade, and González then challenged Toxic Attraction and Kai to a WarGames match at NXT WarGames. A day later, the match was made official. The following week, Rose lost to Jade in a non-title match after interference from Kay Lee Ray, who later joined Shirai, Jade, and González's WarGames team. On the November 30 episode, Ray defeated Kai in a ladder match to earn her team the WarGames advantage.

At NXT: Halloween Havoc, Tommaso Ciampa defeated Bron Breakker to retain the NXT Championship. On the November 23 episode of NXT, Halloween Havoc hosts Grayson Waller and LA Knight engaged in a brawl that spilled backstage. Later that night, Carmelo Hayes retained the NXT North American Championship against Johnny Gargano and Pete Dunne in a triple threat match after interference from Tony D'Angelo. After the match, the brawl between Waller and Knight returned to the ring before Ciampa sent Hayes, D'Angelo, and Waller retreating. However, Breakker appeared and sided with Hayes, D'Angelo, and Waller. They then challenged Ciampa, Knight, Dunne, and Gargano to a WarGames match before the two teams brawled as the show ended. A day later, the match was made official for NXT WarGames. On the November 30 episode, Breakker defeated Gargano in a ladder match to earn his team the WarGames advantage. Breakker's team was named Team 2.0 to represent the NXT 2.0 era of wrestlers, while Gargano's team was named Team Black & Gold to represent NXT prior to the rebranding as those were the colors of the brand.

At NXT: Halloween Havoc, Cameron Grimes was invited to Duke Hudson's Poker Room on the following week's episode, where he beat him with a full house of 2's against his Aces. On the November 16 episode of NXT, Hudson challenged Grimes to a poker showdown where he lost again due to his bluff, and powerbombed him through the poker table before trimming his beard and ponytail. The following week, a short-haired Grimes challenged Hudson to a hair vs. hair match at NXT WarGames, which he accepted.

On the November 23 episode of NXT, Malcolm Bivens and the Diamond Mine confronted Joe Gacy in the ring for stealing the spotlight away from them the prior week, and wanted to take it back by asking him to leave the ring so that Ivy Nile could have her match. Gacy respected Nile's right to have a match but had no respect for NXT Cruiserweight Champion Roderick Strong, saying his name invoked "toxic masculinity" and that the cruiserweight division divided people by promoting exclusivity and "weight shaming". Strong said he wanted to embarrass Gacy, leading Bivens to set up a match between the two at NXT WarGames. The following week, Gacy (accompanied by Harland) hosted an all-inclusive invitational in response to the Cruiserweight division being a "toxic environment" that left out "height, weight, and gender bias". After Gacy's matches against two enhancement talents, Gacy left Strong lying following a handspring clothesline before retreating with Harland.

On the November 30 episode of NXT, Kyle O'Reilly and Von Wagner defeated Legado Del Fantasma (Joaquin Wilde and Raul Mendoza) to become the number one contenders for Imperium's (Fabian Aichner and Marcel Barthel) NXT Tag Team Championship. The match was subsequently scheduled for NXT WarGames.

== Event ==
Other on-screen personnel
Role:	Name:
Commentators	Vic Joseph
Commentators	Wade Barrett
Commentators	Beth Phoenix
Spanish commentators	Carlos Cabrera
Spanish commentators	Marcelo Rodríguez
Ring announcer	Alicia Taylor
Referees	Darryl Sharma
Referees	Dallas Irvin
Referees	Daphanie LaShaunn
Referees	Derek Sanders
Referees	Blair Baldwin
Referees	Felix Fernandez
Pre-show panel	Sam Roberts
Pre-show panel	McKenzie Mitchell
Pre-show panel	Denise Salcedo

=== Dark match ===
Before the event went live on pay-per-view and the streaming services, Odyssey Jones defeated Andre Chase in a dark match.

=== Preliminary matches ===
The actual event began with the women's WarGames match, which saw Cora Jade, Kay Lee Ray, Io Shirai, and Raquel González take on Toxic Attraction (Mandy Rose, Gigi Dolin, and Jacy Jayne) and Dakota Kai. Kai and Ray started the match. Ray dominated the first few minutes. As Ray's team had the WarGames advantage, Jade entered next. Ray performed a KLR Bomb on Kai onto a trash can wrapped around Dolin before Shirai entered next. She brought multiple chairs and another trash can into the cage. However, Kai performed a Pump Kick on Shirai as she entered the cage. Kai and Dolin then dominated Shirai and Jade. Dolin then sent Jade into the cage wall before Jayne entered next. She brought a table into the cage while Dolin set it up. After the tide shifted, Shirai, Ray, and Jade placed Jayne onto the table, and Jade performed a Senton from the top of the cage on Jayne through it, dislocating her left shoulder in the process. Shirai then placed Jade's shoulder back into place, after which, González entered next with Rose entering last. Rose set her sights on the injured Jade until Shirai attacked her. After Rose, Dolin, and Jayne dominated González, Jade broke up a pinning attempt with a kendo stick. Rose performed a Bicycle Knee to Jade's injured shoulder, but Jade kicked out. In the climax, González performed a Chingona Bomb on Jayne, after which, González and Dolin took each other out. Jade then pinned Jayne to win the match for her team.

In the second match, Imperium (Fabian Aichner and Marcel Barthel) defended the NXT Tag Team Championship against Kyle O'Reilly and Von Wagner. In the closing moments, after an evenly contested match, O'Reilly applied a Kimura Lock on Aichner, who made it to his feet, and he and Barthel performed the European Bomb on O'Reilly to retain the titles. After the match, Wagner attempted to attack O'Reilly, but O'Reilly saw it coming and attacked Wagner before doing The Undisputed Era handsign and crotch drop. O'Reilly then brawled with Wagner as he walked away.

In the third match, Cameron Grimes took on Duke Hudson in a hair vs. hair match. In the closing moments, Hudson attempted a Razor's Edge on Grimes, but Grimes countered into a hurricanrana into the turnbuckle and rolled up Hudson to win the match. After the match, Hudson performed a Clothesline on Grimes and attempted to shave his hair, but Grimes recovered and performed a Cave In on Hudson before shaving his hair.

Following this, it was announced that NXT: New Year's Evil would take place on January 4, 2022.

In the penultimate match, Roderick Strong (accompanied by Diamond Mine) defended the NXT Cruiserweight Championship against Joe Gacy. During the match, Gacy performed a Brainbuster on Strong for a one count. Strong performed an Angle Slam on Gacy for a nearfall. Strong applied a Boston Crab on Gacy, who escaped. Gacy then applied a Crossface on Strong, who also escaped. Gacy performed a Tope Con Hilo on Strong and The Creed Brothers (Brutus Creed and Julius Creed). In the climax, Harland appeared and lifted up Ivy Nile, but Gacy told him to put her down. Gacy then performed a Gutwrench Powerbomb on Strong for a nearfall. Strong then performed a Jumping Knee and an End of Heartache on Gacy to retain the title.

Before the main event, Kyle O'Reilly was interviewed backstage about his attack on Von Wagner, and also talked about not being in a WarGames match for the first time since WWE began using the concept. O'Reilly then challenged Wagner to a Steel Cage match for the following episode of NXT.

=== Main event ===
The main event was the men's WarGames match, which saw Team 2.0 (Bron Breakker, Carmelo Hayes, Tony D'Angelo, and Grayson Waller, accompanied by Trick Williams) take on Team Black & Gold (Johnny Gargano, Pete Dunne, LA Knight, and Tommaso Ciampa). Hayes and Gargano began the match. Team 2.0 had the WarGames advantage as Waller entered next. Williams tossed a chair into the cage and attempted to climb the cage, only for Gargano to use the chair to knock Williams off. Dunne entered next. Waller then performed Stunners on Dunne and Gargano before D'Angelo entered next. Williams brought kendo sticks, a table, and a trash can in the cage before Dexter Lumis, who Hayes and Williams viciously attacked a few weeks earlier, appeared from underneath the ring, sending Williams running. D'Angelo padlocked the cage shut before Knight entered next. He climbed the cage and dominated D'Angelo, Waller, and Hayes himself. Referees unlocked the cage with bolt cutters before Breakker entered next. Breakker proceeded to dominate Team Black & Gold until Ciampa entered last. Notable moments that occurred after WarGames officially began included Knight performing a belly-to-belly suplex from the top rope on Waller through a table, Waller performing an elbow drop from the top of the cage on Knight through another table, D'Angelo removing Dunne's mouth guard before performing a neckbreaker with an assist from a crowbar, and Gargano and Ciampa performing their old DIY finisher, Meeting in the Middle, on Breakker. In the closing moments, Hayes performed a low blow on Gargano, after which, Ciampa knocked out both men. As Ciampa went for a Fairytale ending on Hayes, Breakker performed a Spear on Ciampa through a table positioned in the corner. Breakker then performed a Military Press Powerslam on Ciampa to win the match for his team.

== Reception ==
John Moore of Pro Wrestling Dot Net gave praise to both WarGames matches, highlighting the women's bout for telling a "multi-part dramatic story", and called the NXT Tag Title match the "best Tag Team Match NXT has had in a long long time". He concluded by calling the event "a great show and definitely a Takeover which I'm glad they're sticking with formula-wise for now". Matthew McFarlin of Slam Wrestling reviewed the event and gave it 4 out of 5 stars. He wrote: "Rarely is NXT 2.0 an enjoyable watch, but NXT WarGames certainly was. In fact, it was pretty captivating. The utter carnage of both WarGames matches is an annual tradition, and in between were some solid cageless matches. The legitimate scenarios regarding contract statuses and the state, in whole, of NXT gave NXT WarGames the genuine emotion that the weekly programming just doesn't have". Chris Mueller of Bleacher Report called the men's WarGames match the "biggest highlight of the show", praised the Hair vs. Hair bout for being a "pretty good showcase" for Grimes and Hudson, felt the women's WarGames match had "poorly planned" spots, and criticized the "overall pace and story" of the Cruiserweight Championship bout, concluding that: "This was a decent show but when you compare it to most TakeOvers, it had a lot less excitement". Thomas Hall of 411Mania gave the event a 7.5 out of 10, which was lower than last year's event that got an 8.5 out of 10. He was critical of both WarGames matches having long runtimes and being mostly filler until the final minutes, saying the women's bout would have been "better suited as an elimination tag" and was more "dull than actively bad", and felt the NXT Tag Title match lacked importance on the card but saw both teams putting in the effort. He called the event "far from some disaster or even that bad a lot of the time", but questioned how the NXT brand will do once the veterans leave, concluding that, "[T]he show is still holding it together and as usual, things are better when they focus on wrestling, but the future isn't exactly looking bright".

== Aftermath ==
On the following episode of NXT, Kyle O'Reilly and Von Wagner faced each other in a Steel Cage match, where Wagner was victorious. Wagner viciously attacked O'Reilly with the cage door after the match. This ended up being O'Reilly's final WWE appearance, as his WWE contract expired after the event and chose not to renew it. O'Reilly then made his All Elite Wrestling debut at AEW Holiday Bash later that month.

Also on NXT, Johnny Gargano addressed the NXT fans and talked about his future, only for Grayson Waller to viciously attack him with a steel chair. Waller ended the attack after planting Gargano with a Powerbomb through the announce table. This was also Gargano's final WWE appearance, as his contract expired after the event, but he returned on the main roster as part of the Raw brand on the August 22, 2022, episode of Raw. Gargano then returned to NXT at NXT: Roadblock on March 7, 2023, where he was revealed as Waller's opponent at that year's Stand & Deliver, where Gargano was victorious.

On the December 14 episode of NXT, after Bron Breakker defeated NXT Cruiserweight Champion Roderick Strong in a non-title match, Tommaso Ciampa appeared and laid out Breakker with Willow's bell before standing tall with the NXT Championship as the show ended. The following week, Ciampa told Breakker that he would get another shot at the NXT Championship at New Year's Evil. At the event, Breakker defeated Ciampa to win the title for the first time.

A non-title match between Dexter Lumis and NXT North American Champion Carmelo Hayes took place on the following episode of NXT, where Lumis won via disqualification after interference from Trick Williams. After the match, Lumis attacked Williams before Hayes saved him and retreated. Two weeks later, Lumis defeated Williams.

Tony D'Angelo taking Pete Dunne's mouth guard during the men's WarGames match would start a rivalry between the two. On the December 14 episode of NXT, Dunne took his mouth guard back from D'Angelo. A match between the two took place the following week, where Dunne won. Following the match, however, D'Angelo attacked Dunne with a crowbar. A Crowbar on a Pole match between the two took place on the January 11, 2022, episode of NXT, where D'Angelo won. On the January 25 episode, D'Angelo lost a match to determine the number one contender for the NXT North American Championship after interference from Dunne. Eventually, a weaponized steel cage match between the two was scheduled for Vengeance Day, where Dunne won to end the feud.

Also on the following episode of NXT, Duke Hudson, who was wearing a blonde wig, talked about his loss to Cameron Grimes at WarGames when Grimes interrupted. Hudson told Grimes that he cheated to win and challenged him to a No Holds Barred match for the following week, and Grimes accepted. On that subsequent episode, Grimes defeated Hudson to end the feud. After the match, Grimes removed Hudson's wig to reveal his bald head.

Cora Jade took on Dakota Kai on the December 14 episode of NXT, where Jade was victorious. After the match, however, Kai attacked Jade, but Raquel González sent Kai retreating. Moments later, Gigi Dolin and Jacy Jayne distracted Jade, allowing Mandy Rose to attack her. Later that night, González and Kai were being pulled apart by referees while in the parking lot. Afterwards, González challenged Kai to a street fight for the following week, which was later made official. On that subsequent episode, González defeated Kai. Following the match, González called out Rose to demand a title rematch but got Jade instead. Moments later, Rose appeared on the TitanTron and challenged both of them to a triple threat match for the NXT Women's Championship at New Year's Evil. On the December 28 episode, Rose arranged a tag team match pitting Jade and González against Io Shirai and Kay Lee Ray for that episode's main event, where the winning team got to challenge her for the NXT Women's Championship at New Year's Evil. The match was won by Jade and González.

The 2021 NXT WarGames would be WWE's final PPV and livestreaming event to carry the term "pay-per-view", as beginning with Day 1 the following month, WWE began to use the term "premium live event" for all of their events airing on pay-per-view and their livestreaming platforms, including NXT's. In addition, the 2021 NXT WarGames would be NXT's last major event to air on traditional PPV as beginning with the 2022 calendar year, NXT's major events became only available via WWE's livestreaming platforms. Also in 2022, the WarGames concept was moved to the main roster as part of Survivor Series, with that year's event rebranded as Survivor Series: WarGames. This subsequently ended the NXT WarGames event, which was replaced by NXT Deadline.

== Results ==
No.	Results	Stipulations	Times
1^{D}	Odyssey Jones defeated Andre Chase	Singles match	8:24
2	Cora Jade, Io Shirai, Kay Lee Ray, and Raquel González defeated Dakota Kai and Toxic Attraction (Mandy Rose, Gigi Dolin, and Jacy Jayne) by pinfall	WarGames match	31:22
3	Imperium (Fabian Aichner and Marcel Barthel) (c) defeated Kyle O'Reilly and Von Wagner by pinfall	Tag team match for the NXT Tag Team Championship	14:53
4	Cameron Grimes defeated Duke Hudson by pinfall	Hair vs. Hair match	10:24
5	Roderick Strong (c) (with Diamond Mine) defeated Joe Gacy (with Harland) by pinfall	Singles match for the NXT Cruiserweight Championship	8:27
6	Team 2.0 (Bron Breakker, Grayson Waller, Tony D'Angelo, and Carmelo Hayes) (with Trick Williams) defeated Team Black & Gold (Johnny Gargano, LA Knight, Pete Dunne, and Tommaso Ciampa) (with Dexter Lumis) by pinfall	WarGames match	38:11
(c) / – the champion(s) heading into the match; D / – this was a dark match
