= NXT TakeOver: WarGames (2020) =

WWE pay-per-view and livestreaming event

- Promotional poster featuring various NXT wrestlers
- Promotion: WWE
- Brand: NXT
- Date: December 6, 2020
- City: Orlando, Florida
- Venue: Capitol Wrestling Center at WWE Performance Center
- Attendance: 0 (behind closed doors) (Note: The event was held without a paying audience due to the COVID-19 pandemic in the United States, though it featured a live crowd of WWE wrestlers, trainees, and select invited fans as well as virtual fans via NXT's Capitol Wrestling Center viewing experience.)

WWE event chronology
← Previous; Survivor Series	Next → TLC: Tables, Ladders & Chairs

NXT TakeOver chronology
← Previous; 31	Next → Vengeance Day

NXT TakeOver: WarGames chronology
← Previous; 2019	Next → 2021

The 2020 NXT TakeOver: WarGames was a professional wrestling pay-per-view (PPV) and livestreaming event produced by WWE, held exclusively for wrestlers from the promotion's NXT brand division. It was the 32nd NXT TakeOver event and the fourth annual NXT WarGames. Due to the COVID-19 pandemic, it took place on December 6, 2020, from the Capitol Wrestling Center, a bio-secure bubble that was hosted at the WWE Performance Center in Orlando, Florida. The event centered on the WarGames match, a type of roofless steel cage match that surrounds two rings placed side by side and is contested by teams of multiple wrestlers; the first team to score a pinfall or submission wins while escaping the cage is a forfeit.

Five matches were contested at the event, including two WarGames matches with one each for the men and women. The main event was the men's WarGames match in which The Undisputed Era (Adam Cole, Kyle O'Reilly, Roderick Strong, and Bobby Fish) defeated Team McAfee (Pat McAfee, Pete Dunne, Danny Burch, and Oney Lorcan), while the opening bout was the women's match, where Team Candice (Candice LeRae, Dakota Kai, Raquel González, and Toni Storm) defeated Team Shotzi (Shotzi Blackheart, Ember Moon, Rhea Ripley, and Io Shirai).

This was the first WarGames event to air on traditional PPV in addition to the WWE Network. The 2020 event ended the show's tradition of being held as part of Survivor Series weekend. It was also the final WarGames held under the TakeOver series, which was discontinued in late 2021 with WarGames held as its own event that year. This would also be the final WarGames event to livestream on the American version of the WWE Network, which merged under Peacock in April 2021.

== Production ==
=== Background ===
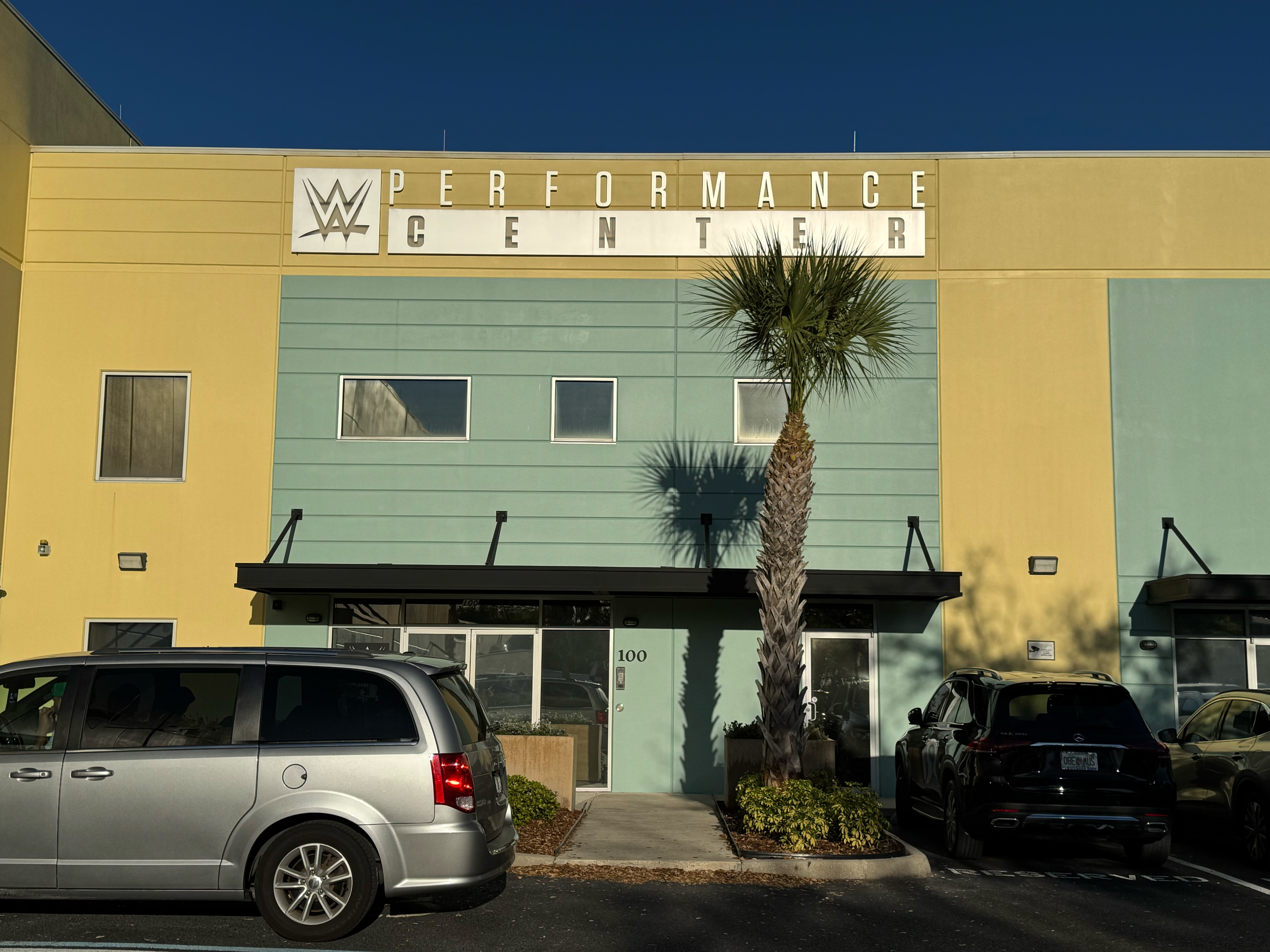
Due to the COVID-19 pandemic, the 32nd NXT TakeOver event, and fourth annual NXT WarGames, was produced by way of a bio-secure bubble called the Capitol Wrestling Center, which was hosted at the WWE Performance Center in Orlando, Florida.

TakeOver was a series of professional wrestling events that began in May 2014, as WWE's NXT brand held its second WWE Network-exclusive livestreaming event, billed as TakeOver. The "TakeOver" moniker subsequently became the branding for all of NXT's major events held periodically throughout the year. While originally exclusive to the WWE Network, TakeOver events also became available on traditional pay-per-view beginning with TakeOver 31 in October 2020.

Announced on September 3, 2020, the 32nd TakeOver event was scheduled for December 6. During the November 18 episode of NXT, it was promoted as "TakeOver: WarGames", marking the fourth WarGames event, an annual subseries of TakeOvers that featured the WarGames match and were originally held as a support show for WWE's annual Survivor Series for the main roster. Unlike previous years, however, the 2020 WarGames was not held as a support show for that year's Survivor Series as it was instead held two weeks after Survivor Series. It was available for purchase on In Demand.

The WarGames match is a type of roofless steel cage match that surrounds two rings placed side by side. It is contested by two or three teams composed of three to six members each. One member from each team starts in the cage, and every couple of minutes, another team member enters in a staggered format until all participants have entered. Once all participants are in the cage, the match officially begins and the first team to score a pinfall or submission wins, while escaping the cage is a forfeit.

==== Impact of the COVID-19 pandemic ====
As a result of the COVID-19 pandemic that began affecting the industry in mid-March, WWE had to present the majority of its programming from a behind closed doors set. NXT's programming was initially held at its home venue at the time, Full Sail University in Winter Park, Florida. In October 2020, NXT's events were moved to a bio-secure bubble called the Capitol Wrestling Center, which was hosted at the WWE Performance Center in Orlando, Florida. Like the WWE ThunderDome utilized for Raw and SmackDown's programming, LED boards were placed around the Performance Center so that fans could attend virtually, while additionally and unlike the ThunderDome, friends and family members of the wrestlers were in attendance, along with a limited number of actual live fans, divided from each other by plexiglass walls.

=== Storylines ===
The card included matches that resulted from scripted storylines. Results were predetermined by WWE's writers on the NXT brand, while storylines were produced on WWE's weekly television program, NXT.

In July, a feud began between Pat McAfee and The Undisputed Era's Adam Cole. This led to a match at TakeOver XXX, where Cole was victorious. On the October 21 episode of NXT, Undisputed Era members Bobby Fish and Kyle O'Reilly were scheduled to challenge Breezango (Tyler Breeze and Fandango) for the NXT Tag Team Championship. However, Fish and Roderick Strong were attacked backstage, leading to O'Reilly choosing Danny Burch and Oney Lorcan. They won the title after interference from Pat McAfee, who aligned with Burch and Lorcan. At NXT: Halloween Havoc, McAfee stated that it was part of a feud between him and The Undisputed Era, and also revealed that he hired Ridge Holland to attack Adam Cole at TakeOver 31. After Holland legitimately got injured during a match against Burch, McAfee hired him and Lorcan to take out Fish and Strong. As a result, O'Reilly gave the Undisputed Era a title match He later came from the back and was joined by Pete Dunne, who turned on O'Reilly and aligned himself with McAfee's stable, called The Kings of NXT. The following week, the stable interrupted a match pitting Drake Maverick and Killian Dain against Ever-Rise (Matt Martel and Chase Parker) before talking about The Undisputed Era's rise in NXT. On the November 11 episode, McAfee and Dunne accompanied Burch and Lorcan for the latter's title defense against Breezango, which they won. After the match, McAfee, Dunne, Burch, and Lorcan laid out both teams. The following week, McAfee interrupted NXT Champion Finn Bálor mid-promo to brag about all his stable had accomplished. McAfee warned Bálor to hand the title to his stable or be attacked. Bálor revealed that he brought friends, which was revealed to be The Undisputed Era, and they brawled with McAfee's stable as the show ended. On November 19, a WarGames match pitting McAfee, Burch, Lorcan, and Dunne against The Undisputed Era was made official for TakeOver: WarGames. On the November 25 episode of NXT, Dunne defeated O'Reilly in a ladder match to earn his team the WarGames advantage.

At NXT: Halloween Havoc on October 28, Johnny Gargano defeated Damian Priest in a Devil's Playground Match to win the NXT North American Championship, becoming the first-ever two-time NXT North American Champion. On the November 11 episode of NXT, Gargano defended the title against Leon Ruff, who was picked as his opponent by a roulette-style spinning wheel. During the match, Priest distracted Gargano and was pinned by Ruff to win the title for the first time. The following week, Ruff retained the championship against Gargano via disqualification when Priest intentionally punched Ruff. On the November 25 episode of NXT, all three competitors were on The KO Show to state their case for why they wanted the NXT North American Championship, when NXT general manager William Regal appeared to announce the title would be defended in a triple threat match at TakeOver: WarGames.

On the October 7 episode of NXT, Dexter Lumis defeated Austin Theory in a match but was then attacked by Cameron Grimes, saying he felt disrespected by him the prior week. At NXT: Halloween Havoc, the two met in a Haunted House of Horror match, with Lumis beating him in the ring by submission. They faced each other again in a blindfold match on the November 18 episode of NXT, ending in a no contest after Grimes unknowingly knocked the referee unconscious and eventually ran off. The following week, Grimes defeated Jake Atlas in a match but was soon interrupted by Lumis, who offered him a strap but he refused to wear it. Later that night, Regal met Grimes backstage to set up a strap match between him and Lumis at TakeOver: WarGames.

On the November 18 episode of NXT, Timothy Thatcher defeated August Grey in a match but was soon confronted by Tommaso Ciampa, and Thatcher backed away from him saying "I have no problem with you". On the December 2 episode of NXT, Thatcher was in the ring teaching a "Thatch as Thatch Can" lesson on "Distractions", when Ciampa appeared and was told by Thatcher that he did not want any trouble with him. After throwing him to the mat following an attempted attack, Ciampa was blindsided by Thatcher's student and thrown into the plexiglass by Thatcher himself, who then applied a guillotine choke to make him pass out. Thatcher later said he would meet Ciampa for a "lesson" at TakeOver: WarGames.

== Event ==
Other on-screen personnel
Role:	Name:
Commentators	Vic Joseph
Commentators	Wade Barrett
Commentators	Beth Phoenix
Spanish commentators	Carlos Cabrera
Spanish commentators	Marcelo Rodríguez
Ring announcer	Alicia Taylor
Referees	Drake Wuertz
Referees	Darryl Sharma
Referees	D.A. Brewer
Referees	Tom Castor
Referees	Stephon Smith
Referees	Aja Smith
Referees	Jake Clemons
Interviewer	McKenzie Mitchell
Pre-show panel	Sam Roberts
Pre-show panel	Wade Barrett

=== Preliminary matches ===
Before the event began broadcasting live, a six-man tag team match occurred as a dark match between the team of Curt Stallion, Ashante "Thee" Adonis, and August Grey, against the team of Santos Escobar, Raul Mendoza, and Joaquin Wilde, who are collectively known as Legado del Fantasma. This match was uploaded to WWE's YouTube and Facebook accounts the day of the event. After an opening sequence where each man tagged in once, Legado del Fantasma isolated Adonis with repeated tags and tandem offence. He eventually made the "hot tag" to Stallion, who for several moments was dominant in the match, easily dispatching with all three members of the opposing team. The finish came when Grey and Mendoza were legal, and Grey Irish whipped Mendoza into his corner. Escobar blind tagged himself into the match, and entered the ring while Grey executed a hip toss on Mendoza. As Grey turned around, Escobar executed a leg lariat and "Legado" to win the match.

The actual event began with the women's WarGames match, with the team led by Candice LeRae facing the team led by Shotzi Blackheart. Dakota Kai began the match for LeRae's team, and Ember Moon for Blackheart's. Blackheart's team held the advantage heading in to the match, so after five minutes, Blackheart herself joined the match. Further entrances happened at three minute intervals, first Raquel González from Team LeRae, then Rhea Ripley from Team Blackheart, then Toni Storm, then Io Shirai, before LeRae was the final entrant. González, along with an interfering Indi Hartwell, kept Shirai from entering the two-ring WarGames structure for several minutes, and when LeRae entered, Storm secured the cage's entry door with her studded belt, seemingly keeping the NXT Women's Champion from entering. Shirai eventually entered the match by diving off the top of the cage structure and into the ring, while inhabiting a trash can. Other noteworthy spots included Moon performing "The Eclipse" onto Kai while Kai stood stunned over two steel chairs, Blackheart performing her signature finishing senton splash off a ladder onto LeRae while LeRae had a chair draped over her (reportedly causing LeRae to sustain a broken arm), Kai performing a diving double stomp onto Shirai while Shirai was again inhabiting a trash can, and González performing a Chingona Bomb onto Shirai through a ladder bridge set up between the two rings. This last spot was the match's conclusion, with González pinning Shirai to secure victory for Team LeRae.

Tommaso Ciampa then faced Timothy Thatcher in the only standard singles match featured on the show. The match featured lengthy sequences of grueling mat wrestling, with each man targeting body parts where the other was known to have history of injury - Thatcher focused much of his offence on Ciampa's neck and knees and Ciampa on Thatcher's left leg. Thatcher also sustained a bloody contusion to his left ear during the match, following a Ciampa running knee lift. The finish came when Ciampa locked in a guillotine choke on Thatcher through the ropes, which is an illegal hold. With the referee administering the five-count for Ciampa to break it or be disqualified, at the count of four he transitioned into the "Willow's Bell" DDT and earned the pinfall. After the match, as the two men slowly came to, they stared directly at each other for several minutes, even as Thatcher retreated up the entrance ramp and the show cut away to a video package introducing the next match.

Next was the strap match between Cameron Grimes and Dexter Lumis. Grimes arrived to the ring with a leather strap already on his hand. The referee tried to force him to use the strap that had been officially designated for use in the match, but Grimes refused to take his off. The referee asked Lumis if he would agree to using Grimes' strap; consistent with his character, Lumis said nothing. Grimes held the offensive advantage for much of the match, using both his strap and the official strap to attack Lumis' eyes, which had been a focus of their feud up to this point. Lumis eventually gained the advantage by repeatedly whipping Grimes with the strap, as Grimes lay prone on the mat. The finish came when he trapped Grimes in "The Silencer", and Grimes quickly submitted.

In the only championship match of the night, Leon Ruff then defended his NXT North American Championship against two former champions, Damian Priest and Johnny Gargano, the latter the only man to have held the championship more than once as well as being the man Ruff defeated to win it. In the early going, Priest repeatedly tried to dismiss Ruff as a factor in the match, being nearly a foot taller and a hundred pounds heavier than the champion. He tried to focus all of his attacks on Gargano, while warning Ruff to stay out of his way. Gargano, for his part, pretended to team up with Ruff (particularly as Priest also enjoys a noticeable size advantage over Gargano) only to use the seeming teamwork for opportunities to take "cheap shots" at Ruff. Eventually, Priest became angry at Ruff's repeated attempts to physically become part of the match and hit him with one of his signature maneuvers, "The Razor's Edge" (in honour of Razor Ramon, a wrestler Priest looks up to), through a ringside barricade. This appeared to injure Ruff badly enough to necessitate him being removed from the match, and Priest looked shocked and remorseful when Ruff was helped away from ringside. He and Gargano then continued the match alone for several minutes, before Ruff eventually returned. Several nearfalls and false finishes followed. The end of the match came when several figures clad in Ghostface masks appeared at ringside trying to attack Priest. Priest used his high flying abilities to fend off many of them, and appeared poised to hit "The Reckoning" on Gargano to all but certainly win the match and regain the championship. At this point, one final Ghostface appeared and struck Priest with a pipe, removing him from the match. Gargano capitalized and hit Ruff "One Final Beat" DDT to earn the pinfall and win the championship for a record third time. As Gargano and the final Ghostface departed up the entrance ramp, the latter unmasked himself as Austin Theory.

Two vignettes aired after the match, showing the returns of both Finn Bálor and Karrion Kross.

=== Main event ===
The men's WarGames match between The Undisputed Era and the team led by Pat McAfee was the main event. Kyle O'Reilly and Pete Dunne, who had fought in the ladder match to determine the advantage for this match, started off. As McAfee's team held said advantage, the first subsequent man to enter the WarGames structure was Oney Lorcan. After three minutes, O'Reilly's regular tag team partner Bobby Fish joined the fray for team Undisputed Era. The entrance order from that point on was Danny Burch, then Roderick Strong, then McAfee, then Adam Cole. When he entered, McAfee introduced four tables into the WarGames structure, each emblazoned with the Undisputed Era's logo and one of the four team members' names. He performed a moonsault onto Strong to send Strong through the table with his name on it. When Cole came out, he sprayed Team McAfee with a fire extinguisher and went to work on them. Other noteworthy spots included Strong splashing Dunne through one of the tables, McAfee (a former National Football League player competing in just his second professional wrestling match) performing a "Swanton Bomb" from the top of the structure onto all seven other men, McAfee locking in a Figure Four leglock on Cole, Burch and Dunne making repeated use of cricket bats Burch introduced to the structure, Fish sending Burch through one of the other tables, Dunne hitting O'Reilly with "The Bitter End" for a two-count and a sequence of finishing maneuvers. This sequence started with Cole hitting his "Panama City Sunrise" on McAfee for only a nearfall, resulting in Cole's signature WarGames shocked face. Cole then poised to hit McAfee with a "The Last Shot" with an exposed knee, but at the last moment Lorcan, from outta nowhere, pushed McAfee out of the way and ate the move instead. Dunne then hit Cole with "The Bitter End", with Strong breaking up the pinfall. With everyone else out of the picture, O'Reilly and Fish hit Lorcan with a couple of stiff kicks, and O'Reilly followed with a diving knee drop onto a chair placed over Lorcan's face, with this sequence earning the pinfall and victory for team Undisputed Era.

== Reception ==
Wrestling journalist Dave Meltzer's star ratings for each match ranged from generally positive to glowing, as he gave 3.25 stars each to the strap match and the NXT North American Championship triple threat, 3.5 stars to the women's WarGames match, 3.75 stars to the singles match between Tommaso Ciampa and Timothy Thatcher, and 4.75 stars to the men's WarGames match.

The event itself would later become 2020's Event of the Year by NXT.

== Aftermath ==
Along with Candice LeRae's arm injury, Bobby Fish and Oney Lorcan from the men's WarGames match were noted to have suffered serious lacerations, with Lorcan needing assistance to return to the locker room area after the show went off the air. Numerous other wrestlers also reported minor injuries, not expected to cause them to miss time, on their social media profiles after the show. Fish's injury required minor surgery and eight weeks of recovery time to fix; a piece of the cage pierced his elbow and severed his triceps.

A special episode of NXT called New Year's Evil was announced during TakeOver, to air January 6, 2021, the first Wednesday (NXT's typical airdate) of the new year. Finn Bálor opened the December 9 episode of the program, announcing that he would defend the NXT Championship at New Year's Evil but did not especially care who his challenger was, referring to the matter as "Regal's problem." Pete Dunne, Kyle O'Reilly, Damian Priest, and Karrion Kross' valet Scarlett each staked a claim to the title shot. Bálor dismissed Dunne, O'Reilly, and Priest, but seemed prepared to accept Kross' challenge. Kross himself physically returned later in the show, attacking Priest, setting up a match between the two of them at New Year's Evil. On December 16, that left Dunne and O'Reilly to compete in a number one contender's match, won by O'Reilly to set up an NXT TakeOver 31 rematch between himself and Bálor for the championship at New Year's Evil.

Also on December 9, Johnny Gargano, Candice LeRae, Indi Hartwell, and Austin Theory appeared together in the ring, celebrating their successes at WarGames and giving their faction a name, "The Way." On December 30, Gargano defeated Leon Ruff in an NXT North American Championship match to end their feud and mark the first time in three reigns as North American Champion and one as NXT Champion that Gargano had ever successfully defended a singles championship. Off-camera, LeRae's injury was eventually determined not to be a broken arm, but a less serious injury to her abdominal cartilage which would not cause her to miss substantial time.

The feuds between Tommaso Ciampa and Timothy Thatcher on the men's side and Raquel González and Rhea Ripley on the women's side continued after WarGames and into New Year's Evil. On the December 23 episode of NXT, Ciampa and Thatcher were announced for the second-ever Fight Pit match (Thatcher having the won first, earlier in 2020) and Ripley and Gonzalez were announced for a Last Woman Standing match.

The 2020 TakeOver: WarGames would be the final WarGames held under the TakeOver series, as in late 2021, the TakeOver series was discontinued, with the 2021 WarGames event simply promoted as "NXT WarGames". This was also the final WarGames event to livestream on the American version of the WWE Network, which merged under Peacock in April 2021.

== Results ==
No.	Results	Stipulations	Times
1^{D}	Legado del Fantasma (Santos Escobar, Raul Mendoza, and Joaquin Wilde) defeated August Grey, Curt Stallion, and Ashante "Thee" Adonis by pinfall	Six-man tag team match (Note: The match aired on WWE's Facebook page after the event had concluded airing on the WWE Network.)	7:48
2	Team Candice (Candice LeRae, Dakota Kai, Raquel González, and Toni Storm) defeated Team Shotzi (Shotzi Blackheart, Ember Moon, Rhea Ripley, and Io Shirai) by pinfall	WarGames match	35:22
3	Tommaso Ciampa defeated Timothy Thatcher by pinfall	Singles match	16:46
4	Dexter Lumis defeated Cameron Grimes by submission	Strap match	12:52
5	Johnny Gargano defeated Leon Ruff (c) and Damian Priest by pinfall	Triple threat match for the NXT North American Championship	17:28
6	The Undisputed Era (Adam Cole, Bobby Fish, Kyle O'Reilly, and Roderick Strong) defeated Team McAfee (Pat McAfee, Pete Dunne, Danny Burch, and Oney Lorcan) by pinfall	WarGames match	45:00
(c) / – the champion(s) heading into the match; D / – this was a dark match
