= NXT TakeOver (2014) =

WWE Network event

- Promotional poster featuring various NXT wrestlers
- Promotion: WWE
- Brand: NXT
- Date: May 29, 2014
- City: Winter Park, Florida
- Venue: Full Sail University
- Attendance: 400+

WWE event chronology
| ← Previous; Extreme Rules | Next → Payback |

NXT TakeOver chronology
| ← Previous; First | Next → Fatal 4-Way |

NXT major events chronology
| ← Previous; Arrival | Next → TakeOver: Fatal 4-Way |

NXT TakeOver was a 2014 professional wrestling livestreaming event produced by WWE, held exclusively for wrestlers from the promotion's developmental territory, NXT. It was the inaugural NXT TakeOver event and took place on Thursday, May 29, 2014, at NXT's home venue at the time, Full Sail University in Winter Park, Florida. The event aired exclusively on the WWE Network.

Five matches were contested during the main broadcast and one match prior to the televised portion of the show. The main event was the first high-profile NXT Championship defense in Adrian Neville's title reign after winning the championship at NXT Arrival as he wrestled Tyson Kidd. In another prominent match, the tournament finals for the vacant NXT Women's Championship was contested as Charlotte defeated Natalya to win the title.

== Production ==
=== Background ===
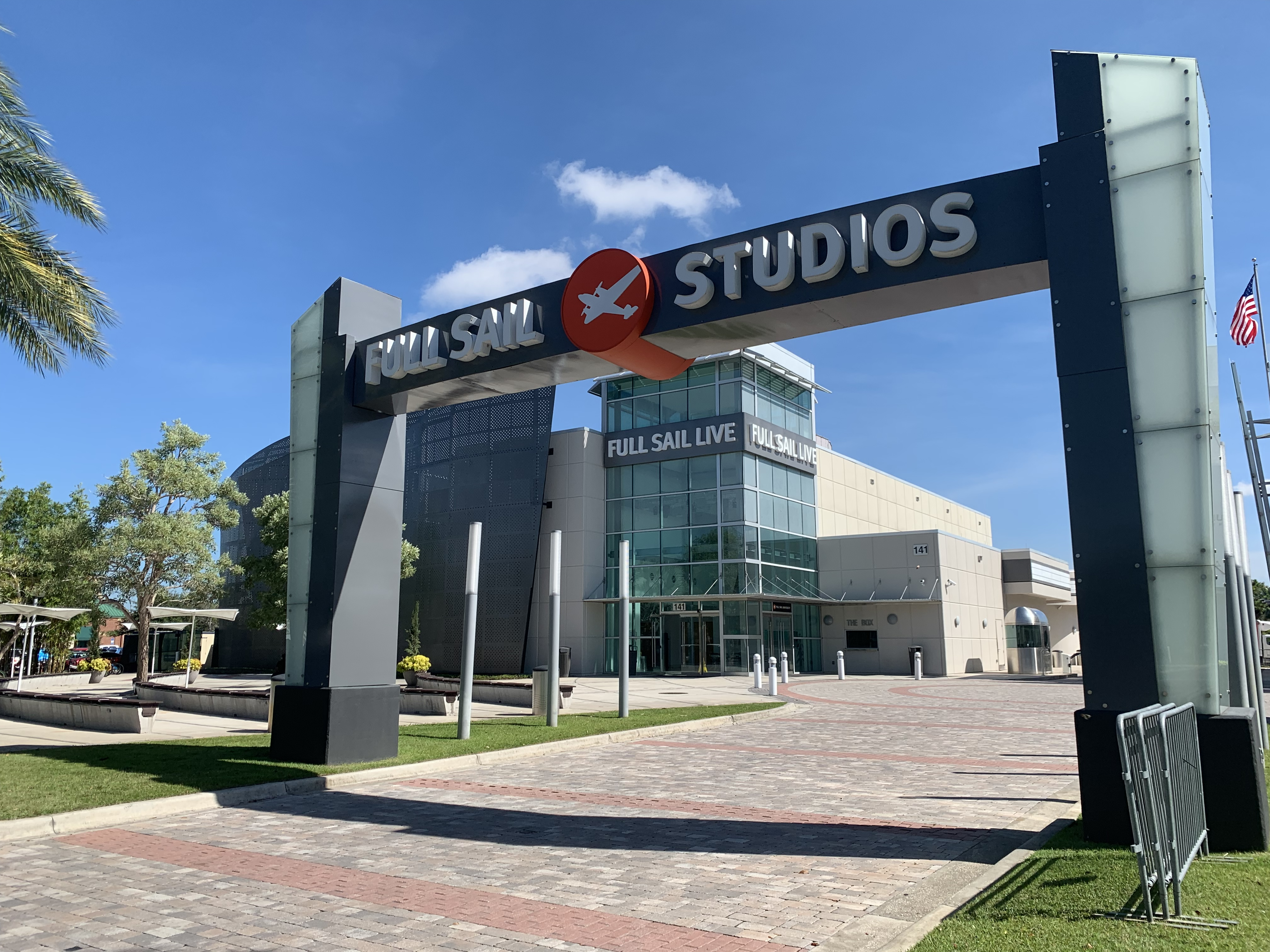
The inaugural NXT TakeOver event was held at NXT's home venue at the time, Full Sail University in Winter Park, Florida.

In 2012, the professional wrestling company WWE restructured its NXT brand from being a reality-based competition television show to a developmental territory for their main roster. In February 2014, the promotion held its first livestreaming special for NXT that was uniquely titled Arrival, which was also the very first event to air live on WWE's online streaming service, the WWE Network, which launched three days earlier. The promotion scheduled its next WWE Network event for NXT as an event called TakeOver. It was scheduled to be held on Thursday, May 29, 2014, at NXT's home venue at the time, Full Sail University in Winter Park, Florida.

=== Storylines ===
The event comprised five matches that from scripted storylines. Results were predetermined by WWE's writers on the NXT brand, while storylines were produced on WWE's weekly television program, NXT.

== Event ==
Other on-screen personnel
| Role: | Name: |
|---|---|
| Commentators | Tom Phillips |
| Commentators | William Regal |
| Commentators | Byron Saxton |
| Ring announcer | Jo-Jo Offerman |
| Ring announcer | Eden |
| Referees | Darrick Moore |
| Referees | Charles Robinson |
| Referees | Jason Ayers |
| Referees | Dan Engler |
| Referees | Shawn Bennett |

The commentators were Tom Phillips, William Regal, and Byron Saxton. The pre-show panel consisted of Christian, Paul Heyman, and Renee Young.

=== Preliminary matches ===
The first match saw Adam Rose face Camacho. Rose executed a "Party Foul" on Camacho to win the match.

Next, The Ascension (Konnor and Viktor) defended the NXT Tag Team Championship against Kalisto and El Local. Viktor pinned El Local after the "Fall of Man" to retain the title.

After that, Sami Zayn faced Tyler Breeze to determine the #1 contender to the NXT Championship. During the match, Zayn executed a "Blue Thunder Bomb" on Breeze for a near-fall. Breeze executed a "Supermodel Kick" on Zayn for a near-fall. In the end, as Zayn attempted a "Helluva Kick" on Breeze, Breeze executed a "Beauty Shot" to win the match.

There was a segment with Mojo Rawley confronting Rusev and Lana; Rusev dominated the resultant brawl.

In the penultimate match, Charlotte (accompanied by her father, Ric Flair) faced Natalya (accompanied by her uncle, WWE Hall of Famer Bret Hart) for the vacant NXT Women's Championship. During the match, Natalya applied the sharpshooter on Charlotte, who countered into the "Figure-Eight Leglock", which Natalya would counter. Charlotte applied the sharpshooter on Natalya but Natalya escaped. Charlotte pinned Natalya after "Natural Selection" to win the title.

=== Main event ===
In the main event, Adrian Neville defended the NXT Championship against Tyson Kidd. During the match, Neville executed a pop-up sitout powerbomb on Kidd for a near-fall. Kidd performed a springboard "Blockbuster" on Neville for a near-fall. Kidd applied the sharpshooter on Neville and transitioned into the "Dungeon Lock", with Neville touching the ropes to break the hold. In the end, Neville executed a super hurricanrana and a "Red Arrow" on Kidd to retain the title.

== Aftermath ==
With the scheduling of NXT TakeOver: Fatal 4-Way in September 2014, the "TakeOver" name would subsequently be used as the brand name for NXT's major events. The TakeOver events were held several times a year, often as support shows for one of WWE's main shows, such as WrestleMania or SummerSlam. The events were originally exclusive to the WWE Network until TakeOver 31 in October 2020 when they also became available on traditional pay-per-view (PPV), and then also on SonyLIV in India and Peacock in the United States after the shutdown of the Indian version of the WWE Network in February and the American version in April. The TakeOver series came to an end in 2021 with the final TakeOver held as TakeOver 36 in August that year. In September 2021, the NXT brand went through a restructuring, being rebranded as "NXT 2.0", reverting to a developmental brand for WWE. It was speculated that with this rebranding, the TakeOver series would be discontinued. On November 9, 2021, NXT's next PPV and livestreaming event was announced as WarGames. While WarGames had been held as a TakeOver event from 2017 to 2020, the announcement confirmed that the 2021 event would not be a TakeOver event, thus ending the TakeOver series.

It was also the last WWE appearance of Camacho before he was released until he re-signed with WWE in 2024 under the ring name Tonga Loa.

== Results ==
| No. | Results | Stipulations | Times |
|---|---|---|---|
| 1 | Adam Rose defeated Camacho by pinfall | Singles match | 5:09 |
| 2 | The Ascension (Konnor and Viktor) (c) defeated El Local and Kalisto by pinfall | Tag team match for the NXT Tag Team Championship | 6:20 |
| 3 | Tyler Breeze defeated Sami Zayn by pinfall | Singles match to determine the #1 contender to the NXT Championship | 15:56 |
| 4 | Charlotte (with Ric Flair) defeated Natalya (with Bret Hart) by pinfall | Singles match for the vacant NXT Women's Championship | 16:51 |
| 5 | Adrian Neville (c) defeated Tyson Kidd by pinfall | Singles match for the NXT Championship | 20:00 |
(c) / – the champion(s) heading into the match

=== NXT Women's Championship Tournament (2014) ===
Quarterfinals
Bayley | 3:58
Sasha Banks | Sub
Layla | 3:30
Natalya | Sub
Alexa Bliss | Pin
Alicia Fox | 3:08
Charlotte | Pin
Emma | 3:50

Semifinals
Sasha Banks | 4:06
Natalya | Sub
Alexa Bliss | 5:01
Charlotte | Pin

Final
Natalya | 16:49
Charlotte | Pin
