= Halftime Heat =

Professional wrestling Super Bowl counterprogramming that is produced by WWE

- WWF Halftime Heat 1999 logo
- Promotion: WWE
- Brand: NXT (2019)
- First event: 1999
- Last event: 2019

Halftime Heat was a series of professional wrestling broadcasts produced by WWE used as Super Bowl counterprogramming. They aired during their respective year's halftime of the Super Bowl.

== History ==
Originally produced under the World Wrestling Federation banner (WWF), Halftime Heat aired during a 20-minute block on USA Network during Super Bowl XXXIII in 1999, as a special episode of Sunday Night Heat. The inaugural Halftime Heat featured an Empty arena match between The Rock and Mankind. The match was also accompanied by a Super Bowl ad purchased by the WWF, tying into their Attitude Era branding. During the match, Mankind won his second WWF Championship.

Halftime Heat returned the following year, featuring highlights from the Hardy Boyz taking on the Dudley Boyz as well as the bikini contest, both from that year's Royal Rumble. It concluded with an Interview with Jim Ross and Stone Cold Steve Austin, which discussed an injury update and his engagement to Debra McMichael.

It was announced in January 2019 that it would be brought back as a special event on the WWE Network, YouTube, Facebook and Twitter. During the pre-show of the Royal Rumble footage was shown of what happened after NXT TakeOver: Phoenix went off the air, which led to the announcement of Aleister Black, Ricochet, and Velveteen Dream taking on Adam Cole, Johnny Gargano, and Tommaso Ciampa, during the returning Halftime Heat. Shawn Michaels was also announced as part of the announce team, and was joined by Vic Joseph. During the match, the team of Black, Ricochet and Dream were victorious. WWE personnel later announced that the match had 3 million viewers, making it the most watched NXT match in history.

== Events ==
The events included matches that resulted from scripted storylines, where wrestlers portrayed villains, heroes, or less distinguishable characters in scripted events that built tension and culminated in a wrestling match or series of matches, with results predetermined by WWE's writers.

#	Super Bowl	Date	City	Venue	Main event	Ref.
1	XXXIII	January 31, 1999	Tucson, Arizona	Tucson Convention Center	The Rock (c) vs. Mankind in an Empty Arena match for the WWF Championship	
2	XXXIV	January 30, 2000	Stamford, Connecticut	Titan Towers	In-studio show (Royal Rumble highlights; interview with Stone Cold Steve Austin as he recovered from neck surgery)	
3	LIII	February 3, 2019	Orlando, Florida	WWE Performance Center	Aleister Black, Ricochet, and Velveteen Dream vs. Johnny Gargano, Tommaso Ciampa, and Adam Cole	

== 1999 ==
Halftime Heat
- Promotion: World Wrestling Federation
- Date: January 26, 1999 (aired January 31, 1999)
- City: Tucson, Arizona
- Venue: Tucson Convention Center
- Attendance: 0

WWE event chronology
← Previous; Royal Rumble	Next → St. Valentine's Day Massacre: In Your House

Halftime Heat chronology
← Previous —	Next → 2019

Halftime Heat was a professional wrestling show produced by World Wrestling Federation (WWF). The event was taped on January 26, 1999 and aired on January 31, 1999, the night of Super Bowl XXXIII, at the Tucson Convention Center in Tucson, Arizona.

On January 26, 1999 WWF taped their episode of February 1 Raw. Prior to the taping, the empty arena match that aired as Halftime Heat was taped.

No.	Results	Stipulations	Times
1	Mankind defeated The Rock (c)	Empty Arena match for the WWF Championship	17:19
(c) / – the champion(s) heading into the match

== 2019 ==
Halftime Heat
- Promotional poster featuring Aleister Black, Velveteen Dream, Ricochet, Johnny Gargano, Tommaso Ciampa, and Adam Cole
- Promotion: WWE
- Brand: NXT
- Date: February 3, 2019
- City: Orlando, Florida
- Venue: WWE Performance Center
- Attendance: c. 100

WWE event chronology
← Previous; Worlds Collide	Next → Elimination Chamber

Halftime Heat chronology
← Previous; 1999	Next → —

Halftime Heat was a professional wrestling event and WWE Network event produced by WWE for their NXT brand division. The event took place on February 3, 2019, the night of Super Bowl LIII, at the WWE Performance Center in Orlando, Florida.

After NXT TakeOver: Phoenix went off the air, Aleister Black, Ricochet, and Velveteen Dream would brawl with Adam Cole, Johnny Gargano, and Tommaso Ciampa. The brawl led to a six-man tag team match between the wrestlers which was scheduled for Halftime Heat.

No.	Results	Stipulations	Times
1	Aleister Black, Ricochet and Velveteen Dream defeated Adam Cole, Johnny Gargano and Tommaso Ciampa	Six-man tag team match	16:15

Other on screen personnel
Ring name	Real name	Notes
Shawn Michaels	Michael Hickenbottom	Color commentator Hall of Famer
Vic Joseph	Victor Travagliante	Lead commentator
Jessika Carr	Jessika Heiser	Referee
Greg Hamilton	Greg Hutson	Ring announcer
