= NXT TakeOver: Phoenix =

2019 WWE Network event

- Promotional poster featuring Tommaso Ciampa, Aleister Black, Shayna Baszler, and Bianca Belair
- Promotion: WWE
- Brand: NXT
- Date: January 26, 2019
- City: Phoenix, Arizona
- Venue: Talking Stick Resort Arena

WWE event chronology
← Previous; NXT UK TakeOver: Blackpool	Next → Royal Rumble

NXT TakeOver chronology
← Previous; WarGames	Next → New York

NXT TakeOver: Phoenix was a 2019 professional wrestling livestreaming event produced by WWE, held exclusively for wrestlers from the promotion's developmental brand, NXT. It was the 23rd NXT TakeOver event and took place on January 26, 2019, at the Talking Stick Resort Arena in Phoenix, Arizona. It was held as part of that year's Royal Rumble weekend and aired exclusively on the WWE Network.

Five matches were contested at the event. In the main event, Tommaso Ciampa defeated Aleister Black to retain the NXT Championship. In the penultimate match, Shayna Baszler defeated Bianca Belair by technical submission to retain the NXT Women's Championship. In other prominent matches, Johnny Gargano defeated Ricochet to win the NXT North American Championship, and in the opening bout, War Raiders (Hanson and Rowe) defeating The Undisputed Era (Kyle O'Reilly and Roderick Strong) to win the NXT Tag Team Championship.

== Production ==
=== Background ===
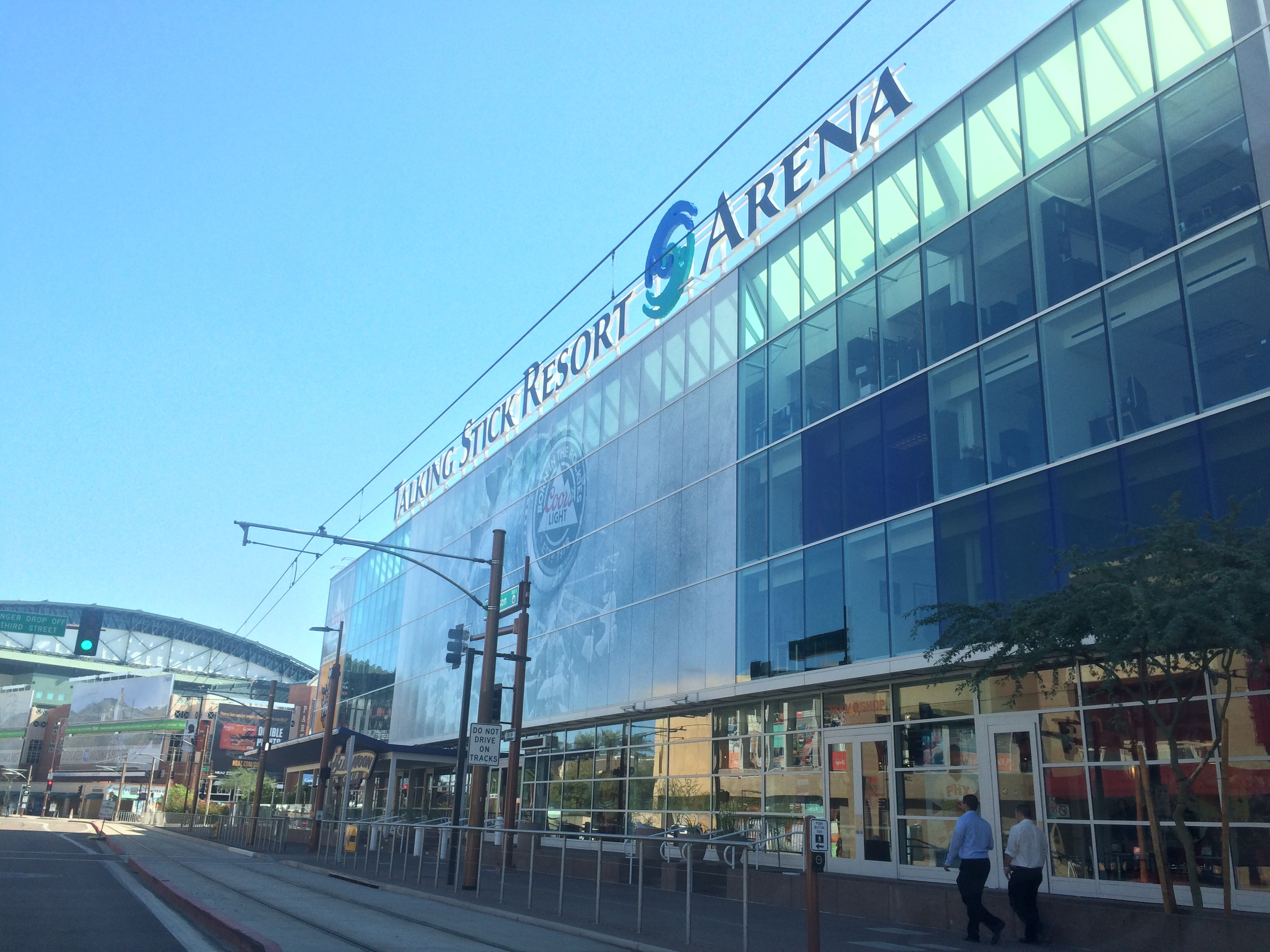
The 23rd NXT TakeOver event was held at the Talking Stick Resort Arena in Phoenix, Arizona.

TakeOver was a series of professional wrestling events that began in May 2014, as WWE's developmental brand, NXT, held its second WWE Network-exclusive livestreaming event, billed as TakeOver. The "TakeOver" moniker subsequently became the branding for all of NXT's major events held periodically throughout the year. Announced on January 24, 2018, TakeOver: Phoenix was scheduled as the 23rd TakeOver event and was held on Saturday, January 26, 2019, as a support show for that year's Royal Rumble for the main roster. It was held at the Talking Stick Resort Arena and was named after the venue's city of Phoenix, Arizona. Tickets went on sale on October 26, 2018.

=== Storylines ===
The card included matches that resulted from scripted storylines. Results were predetermined by WWE's writers on the NXT brand, while storylines were produced on WWE's weekly television program, NXT.

On the July 25, 2018, episode of NXT, Tommaso Ciampa defeated Aleister Black to win the NXT Championship when interference by Johnny Gargano, who was feuding with Ciampa at the time, backfired and instead he cost Black the title. After their interaction, in August, Black was injured by Gargano backstage, preventing him from getting his rematch against Ciampa. Black returned a few months later and on the December 5 episode, a match between the two was scheduled for TakeOver: Phoenix.

On the December 26, 2018, episode of NXT, after three weeks of qualifying matches, Bianca Belair defeated Io Shirai, Lacey Evans, and Mia Yim in a fatal four-way match to become the new number one contender for the NXT Women's Championship.

On the January 9, 2019, episode of NXT, War Raiders attacked The Undisputed Era during EC3's match with Adam Cole. General Manager of NXT, William Regal announced via Twitter that at TakeOver: Phoenix, The Undisputed Era's Kyle O'Reilly and Roderick Strong would defend their NXT Tag Team Championship against The War Raiders.

On the December 19, 2018, episode of NXT, Johnny Gargano defeated Aleister Black in a Steel Cage match after interference from Tommaso Ciampa. The following week, via a video recording, Ciampa suggested that Gargano go after the NXT North American Championship so he and Gargano could "take over the world" in NXT. On the January 9, 2019, episode, champion Ricochet told Gargano that he only needed to ask for a title shot, though he questioned if Gargano would ask face-to-face or attack from behind, referencing Gargano's attack on Black. Ciampa came out to further the conflict between Ricochet and Gargano, but was attacked by Black. This confrontation distracted Ricochet, allowing Gargano to give him a superkick, and the match was made official later in the night.

== Event ==
Other on-screen personnel
Role:	Name:
English commentators	Mauro Ranallo
English commentators	Nigel McGuinness
English commentators	Percy Watson
Spanish commentators	Carlos Cabrera
Spanish commentators	Marcelo Rodríguez
Ring announcer	Kayla Braxton
Referees	Drake Wuertz
Referees	Eddie Orengo
Referees	Darryl Sharma
Referees	Jessika Carr
Interviewers	Sarah Schreiber
Pre-show panel	Charly Caruso
Pre-show panel	Sam Roberts
Pre-show panel	Pat McAfee

=== Preliminary matches ===
The event opened with The Undisputed Era (Kyle O'Reilly and Roderick Strong) defending the NXT Tag Team Championship against War Raiders (Hanson and Rowe). Hanson and Rowe performed "Fallout" on O'Reilly to win the titles.

Next, Matt Riddle faced Kassius Ohno. Riddle forced Ohno to submit whilst executing arm trap elbow strikes to win.

After that, Ricochet defended the NXT North American Championship against Johnny Gargano. Gargano applied the "Garga-No-Escape", but Ricochet escaped. Gargano performed a slingshot DDT on Ricochet for a near-fall. Ricochet applied the "Garga-No-Escape", but Gargano escaped. Gargano performed a brainbuster onto the exposed concrete outside the ring and a second slingshot DDT on Ricochet to win the title.

In the penultimate match, Shayna Baszler defended the NXT Women's Championship against Bianca Belair. Belair attempted a 450° splash, but with the help from Marina Shafir and Jessamyn Duke, Baszler avoided the move and applied the "Kirifuda Clutch". Belair passed out, meaning Baszler retained the title by technical submission.

=== Main event ===
In the main event, Tommaso Ciampa defended the NXT Championship against Aleister Black. Ciampa performed a "Fairytale Ending" on Black for a near-fall. Black performed a "Black Mass" on Ciampa, but Ciampa performed an elevated DDT and a second "Fairytale Ending" on Black for a near-fall. Ciampa performed two more "Fairytale Endings" on Black to retain the title. As the show closed, Ciampa and Johnny Gargano stood at the top of the stage with their respective championships.

== Aftermath ==
After the event ended on the WWE Network, in a WWE.com exclusive, a confrontation between Aleister Black, Ricochet, Velveteen Dream, Johnny Gargano, Tommaso Ciampa, and Adam Cole was quickly broken up by referees and officials, but it continued into the backstage area where they were separated again and Black, Ricochet, and Dream were confronted by Triple H. After everything had settled down, Black, Ricochet, and Dream returned to the ring to celebrate. This led to a six-man tag team match at Halftime Heat in which Black, Ricochet, and Velveteen came out victorious against Cole, Gargano, and Ciampa.

== Results ==
No.	Results	Stipulations	Times
1^{N}	The Sky Pirates (Io Shirai and Kairi Sane) defeated Marina Shafir and Jessamyn Duke by pinfall	Tag team match	6:39
2^{N}	The Forgotten Sons (Wesley Blake and Steve Cutler) defeated Street Profits (Angelo Dawkins and Montez Ford) by pinfall	Tag team match	7:17
3	War Raiders (Hanson and Rowe) defeated The Undisputed Era (Kyle O'Reilly and Roderick Strong) (c) by pinfall	Tag team match for the NXT Tag Team Championship	16:57
4	Matt Riddle defeated Kassius Ohno by submission	Singles match	9:20
5	Johnny Gargano defeated Ricochet (c) by pinfall	Singles match for the NXT North American Championship	23:36
6	Shayna Baszler (c) defeated Bianca Belair by technical submission	Singles match for the NXT Women's Championship	15:26
7	Tommaso Ciampa (c) defeated Aleister Black by pinfall	Singles match for the NXT Championship	26:30
(c) / – the champion(s) heading into the match; N / – the match was taped for a future broadcast of NXT
