= Royal Rumble (2019) =

WWE pay-per-view and livestreaming event

- Promotional poster featuring Daniel Bryan, AJ Styles, and various WWE wrestlers
- Promotion: WWE
- Brand(s): Raw; SmackDown; 205 Live
- Date: January 27, 2019
- City: Phoenix, Arizona
- Venue: Chase Field
- Attendance: 48,193 (Note: According to Dave Meltzer of the Wrestling Observer, WWE's figure was false and the total audience was only slightly above 40,000.)

WWE event chronology
← Previous; NXT TakeOver: Phoenix	Next → Worlds Collide

Royal Rumble chronology
← Previous; 2018	Next → 2020

The 2019 Royal Rumble was a professional wrestling pay-per-view (PPV) and livestreaming event produced by WWE, held for wrestlers from the promotion's main roster brands, Raw, SmackDown, and 205 Live. It was the 32nd annual Royal Rumble event and took place on January 27, 2019, at Chase Field in Phoenix, Arizona. It was the first Royal Rumble since 2010 to feature three brands. During the event, WWE reported there were 48,193 people in attendance.

The event was based around the Royal Rumble match, a modified 30-person battle royal in which the participants enter at timed intervals instead of all beginning in the ring at the same time and the respective men's and women's winners received a world championship match at WrestleMania. For the 2007 event, the winners received a choice of which championship to challenge for at WrestleMania 35. The men could choose to challenge for either Raw's Universal Championship or SmackDown's WWE Championship, while the women had the choice between the Raw Women's Championship and the SmackDown Women's Championship.

In total, 10 matches were contested at the event, including three on the Kickoff pre-show. The main event was the 2019 Men's Royal Rumble match, which was won by Raw's Seth Rollins, who last eliminated Braun Strowman, also from Raw. On the undercard, the 2019 Women's Royal Rumble match was won by SmackDown's Becky Lynch, who last eliminated Charlotte Flair, also from SmackDown. Earlier in the night in the opening bout, Lynch lost her SmackDown Women's Championship match against Asuka. Other prominent matches included Brock Lesnar retaining the Universal Championship against Finn Bálor, Daniel Bryan defeating AJ Styles to retain the WWE Championship, and Ronda Rousey defeating Sasha Banks to retain the Raw Women's Championship. The event also featured the return of Jeff Jarrett, who competed in his first WWE match since No Mercy in October 1999.

== Production ==
=== Background ===
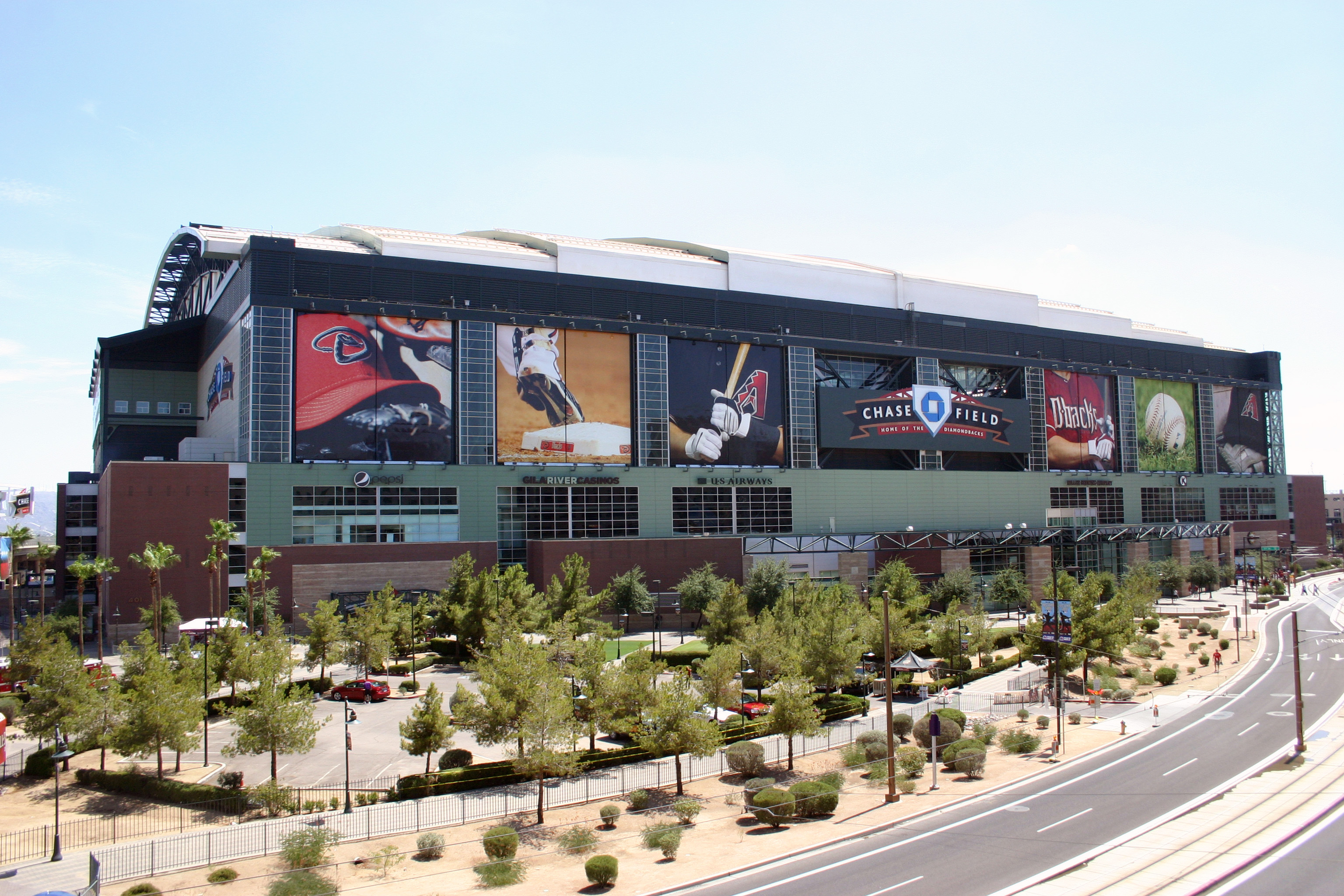
The 32nd annual Royal Rumble event was held at Chase Field in Phoenix, Arizona.

The Royal Rumble is an annual professional wrestling event, produced every January by WWE since 1988; that first event was a television special before it became a pay-per-view (PPV) event beginning in 1989 and then also available via livestreaming on the WWE Network since 2015. It is one of the promotion's original four PPVs, along with WrestleMania, SummerSlam, and Survivor Series, referred to as the "Big Four". It is named after and centered on the Royal Rumble match. Announced on January 24, 2018, the 32nd Royal Rumble event was scheduled to be held on January 27, 2019, at Chase Field in Phoenix, Arizona. It featured wrestlers from the Raw, SmackDown, and 205 Live brand divisions, which was the first Royal Rumble since 2010 to feature three brands. Tickets went on sale on October 12, 2018.

The Royal Rumble match is a modified battle royal in which the participants enter at timed intervals instead of all beginning in the ring at the same time, and the match generally features 30 wrestlers. Since 1993, the winner traditionally earns a world championship match at that year's WrestleMania. For 2019, the men and women could choose to challenge for either brand's top championship at WrestleMania 35: the men had their choice between Raw's Universal Championship or SmackDown's WWE Championship, while the women could choose either the Raw Women's Championship or the SmackDown Women's Championship.

=== Storylines ===
The event comprised ten matches, including three on the Kickoff pre-show, that resulted from scripted storylines. Results were predetermined by WWE's writers on the Raw, SmackDown, and 205 Live brands, while storylines were produced on WWE's weekly television shows, Monday Night Raw, SmackDown Live, and the cruiserweight-exclusive 205 Live.

At TLC: Tables, Ladders & Chairs, Fabulous Truth (Carmella and R-Truth) defeated Mahalicia (Alicia Fox and Jinder Mahal) to win the second season of Mixed Match Challenge. Their prize for winning was each getting the #30 spot in their respective Royal Rumble matches. In the weeks following TLC, multiple wrestlers were announced for both Rumble matches.

At Crown Jewel, Brock Lesnar defeated Braun Strowman to win the vacant Universal Championship, thanks in part to then-Acting Raw General Manager Baron Corbin. At TLC, Strowman defeated Corbin in a Tables, Ladders, and Chairs match, thus stripping Corbin of his authoritative power and earning a Universal Championship match against Lesnar at the Royal Rumble. On the January 14 episode of Raw, Corbin confronted Strowman and insulted him, leading to a chase to the parking area where Corbin hid in a limousine. Strowman shattered the glass and broke the door off, only for WWE Chairman Vince McMahon to appear, revealing that was his limo. Mr. McMahon then fined Strowman $100,000. Strowman then argued with Mr. McMahon, who then cancelled his match with Lesnar. An angry Strowman proceeded to flip over the limo. Later that night, John Cena, Drew McIntyre, Corbin, and Finn Bálor expressed their interests in facing Lesnar at the Royal Rumble. Mr. McMahon scheduled a fatal four-way match where the winner would face Lesnar, which Bálor won after defending his spot earlier in the night against Jinder Mahal. Due to this, Bálor was subsequently removed from the Royal Rumble match.

At TLC, Daniel Bryan defeated AJ Styles to retain the WWE Championship. On the January 1, 2019, episode of SmackDown, Styles earned another opportunity against Bryan at the Royal Rumble by winning a fatal five-way match.

At TLC, Asuka defeated Becky Lynch and Charlotte Flair in a triple threat Tables, Ladders, and Chairs match to win the SmackDown Women's Championship. Following the event, The McMahon Family (Vince McMahon, Shane McMahon, Stephanie McMahon, and Triple H) decreed that champions would no longer have automatic rematch clauses, ruling Lynch out of a guaranteed rematch. After she, Flair, and Carmella all pleaded their cases for why they deserved a title opportunity on the January 1, 2019, episode of SmackDown, WWE Chief Operating Officer Triple H scheduled a triple threat match between the three for the following week to determine Asuka's challenger at the Royal Rumble, which was won by Lynch.

At TLC, Ronda Rousey retained the Raw Women's Championship against Nia Jax. On the January 7, 2019, episode of Raw, Rousey appeared on Alexa Bliss' interview segment, "A Moment of Bliss", and stated that she wanted to face Sasha Banks next, believing Banks to be a true test of her abilities. Jax interrupted, wanting a rematch against Rousey. Banks then came out and challenged Jax to a match in which the winner would face Rousey for the Raw Women's Championship at the Royal Rumble, which Banks won.

At Crown Jewel, Shane McMahon won the WWE World Cup, replacing The Miz in the finals, who was deemed unable to compete due to a pre-match brawl. Following this, The Miz began a pursuit to form a tag team with Shane, claiming that they could be the best tag team in the world. Shane finally agreed to the pairing, and on the January 8, 2019, episode of SmackDown, Miz challenged The Bar (Cesaro and Sheamus) for the SmackDown Tag Team Championship at the Royal Rumble, and The Bar accepted.

On the TLC Kickoff pre-show, Buddy Murphy retained the WWE Cruiserweight Championship against Cedric Alexander. On the December 26, 2018, episode of 205 Live, General Manager Drake Maverick scheduled Murphy to defend the title at the Royal Rumble in a fatal four-way match with his opponents to be decided in qualifying matches. The following week, Kalisto and Akira Tozawa qualified for the match by defeating Lio Rush and Drew Gulak, respectively. Hideo Itami won the final spot by defeating Alexander. The match was scheduled for the Royal Rumble Kickoff pre-show.

On the December 25, 2018, episode of SmackDown, Rusev defeated Shinsuke Nakamura to win the United States Championship. On the January 1, 2019, episode, while Rusev and his wife/manager Lana were celebrating the title win, Nakamura attacked Rusev with Lana also getting hurt in the scuffle. On the January 15 episode, Rusev was scheduled to defend the title against Nakamura on the Royal Rumble Kickoff pre-show.

== Event ==
Other on-screen personnel
Role:	Name:
English commentators	Michael Cole (Raw/Men's Royal Rumble match)
English commentators	Corey Graves (Raw/SmackDown/both Royal Rumble matches
English commentators	Renee Young (Raw/Women's Royal Rumble match)
English commentators	Tom Phillips (SmackDown/Women's Royal Rumble match)
English commentators	Byron Saxton (SmackDown)
English commentators	Vic Joseph (205 Live)
English commentators	Nigel McGuinness (205 Live)
English commentators	Aiden English (205 Live)
English commentators	Jerry Lawler (Men's Royal Rumble match)
English commentators	John "Bradshaw" Layfield (Men's Royal Rumble match)
English commentators	Beth Phoenix (Women's Royal Rumble match)
Spanish commentators	Carlos Cabrera
Spanish commentators	Marcelo Rodríguez
German commentators	Carsten Schaefer
German commentators	Tim Haber
German commentators	Calvin Knie
Ring announcers	Greg Hamilton (SmackDown/205 Live/Men's Royal Rumble match)
Ring announcers	Mike Rome (Raw/Women's Royal Rumble match)
Referees	Danilo Anfibio
Referees	Jason Ayers
Referees	Jessika Carr
Referees	Mike Chioda
Referees	John Cone
Referees	Dan Engler
Referees	Darrick Moore
Referees	Charles Robinson
Referees	Rod Zapata
Interviewers	Charly Caruso
Interviewers	Kayla Braxton
Pre-show panel	Jonathan Coachman
Pre-show panel	Beth Phoenix
Pre-show panel	Booker T
Pre-show panel	Jerry Lawler
Pre-show panel	Shawn Michaels
Pre-show panel	David Otunga
Pre-show correspondents	Charly Caruso
Pre-show correspondents	John "Bradshaw" Layfield

=== Pre-show ===
Three matches were contested on the Royal Rumble Kickoff pre-show. In the first match, AOP manager Drake Maverick announced a tag team match between Raw Tag Team Champions Bobby Roode and Chad Gable and the team of Scott Dawson (of The Revival) and Rezar (of AOP), with both The Revival and AOP receiving a Raw Tag Team Championship match if they won. In the end, Roode and Gable performed a moonsault/neckbreaker combo on Dawson to win the match.

Next, Rusev defended the United States Championship against Shinsuke Nakamura. In the climax, Rusev's wife Lana stood on the ring apron to notify the referee of Nakamura removing the turnbuckle, which led to Nakamura staring her down. As Rusev attacked Nakamura, he accidentally knocked down his wife. Distracted, Nakamura took advantage and attacked Rusev with the "Kinshasa" to win the title for a second time.

The final match on the pre-show was the fatal four-way match in which Buddy Murphy defended the WWE Cruiserweight Championship against Akira Tozawa, Hideo Itami, and Kalisto. In the climax, Murphy performed "Murphy's Law" on Itami to retain the title.

=== Preliminary matches ===
The actual pay-per-view opened with Asuka defending the SmackDown Women's Championship against Becky Lynch. The climax saw Asuka counter a "Dis-Arm-Her" from Lynch into an inverted "Asuka Lock", which caused Lynch to submit and allowed Asuka to retain her championship.

In the second match, The Bar (Cesaro and Sheamus) defended the SmackDown Tag Team Championship against The Miz and Shane McMahon. In the end, Sheamus inadvertently performed a "Brogue Kick" on Cesaro, before Miz performed a "Skull-Crushing Finale" on Sheamus. Shane then performed a shooting star press on Cesaro to win the titles.

Next, Ronda Rousey defended the Raw Women's Championship against Sasha Banks. During the match, Rousey attempted a forearm on Banks, who moved out of the way, causing it to crash into the ring post. Banks then focused on further weakening the arm. Later, Banks performed a "suicide dive" on Rousey, who caught her and applied an "armbar" on Banks, who submitted, but since it was outside of the ring, the match continued. In the climax, Banks applied the "Bank Statement". Rousey tried to make it to the bottom rope, but Banks transitioned into a crucifix pin for a nearfall and applied a "Fujiwara armbar". Rousey escaped the submission and followed up with a gutwrench powerbomb and "Piper's Pit" on Banks, giving Rousey her first pinfall victory in WWE and thus retaining the title.

The fourth match was the 30-woman Royal Rumble match for a women's championship match at WrestleMania 35. Lacey Evans, making her main roster debut, and Natalya began the match. Natalya applied a sharpshooter on Evans and Mandy Rose (entrant #3) at the same time before Liv Morgan entered at #4. She was quickly eliminated by Natalya in eight seconds. NXT's Xia Li, Kairi Sane, Candice LeRae, Kacy Catanzaro, Io Shirai, and NXT UK's Rhea Ripley were all surprise entrants at #11, #14, #17, #19, #23, and #24 respectively. After Naomi (entrant #16) eliminated Rose, she leapt from the ring barricade onto the steel steps, only for Rose to pull her off the apron and eliminate her. Catanzaro had another save from elimination, walking on her hands to the ring post, but was eliminated by Ripley. The match also saw an appearance by Hornswoggle, who aided in the elimination of Zelina Vega (entrant #20). Lana was scheduled to enter the match at number 28 but still suffered from her injury from the pre-show. Afterwards, Nia Jax (entrant #29) attacked Lana, rendering her unable to compete. Jax would go on to eliminate Shirai, Natalya (who lasted the longest in a women's Royal Rumble match at 56 minutes until it was surpassed by Bianca Belair in 2021), and Bayley (entrant #27). After Carmella entered at #30, Becky Lynch appeared and replaced Lana in the match. Alexa Bliss eliminated Ember Moon, who lasted 52 minutes. Afterwards, Bayley and Carmella worked together to eliminate Bliss. Flair then eliminated Carmella, bringing the final four to Lynch, Flair, Bayley, and Jax. In the climax, Flair sent Jax over the top rope, and Lynch (who was outside of the ring, though not eliminated) eliminated Jax, bringing the final two to Lynch and Flair. Jax shoved Lynch off the steel ring steps, giving her a (storyline) knee injury. After a short battle between Flair and Lynch, Flair attempted a Big Boot, but Lynch countered and sent Flair over the top rope. Lynch then performed a clothesline on Flair to win the match and earn a women's championship match at WrestleMania 35. At one hour and twelve minutes in length, this is the longest women's Royal Rumble match held to date.

After that, Daniel Bryan defended the WWE Championship against AJ Styles. In the climax, a returning Rowan appeared. Bryan then accidentally performed an enzuigiri on the referee. Styles performed a "Styles Clash" on Bryan but Rowan performed a Clawhold Slam on Styles. Bryan then pinned Styles to retain the title.

In the penultimate match, Brock Lesnar defended the Universal Championship against Finn Bálor. Bálor quickly took to the offense. In the climax, Bálor performed the "Coup de Grâce" on Lesnar, but Lesnar kicked out and immediately applied a kimura lock on Bálor, who submitted, to retain the title. After the match, Lesnar performed three German suplexes and an "F-5" on Bálor.

=== Main event ===
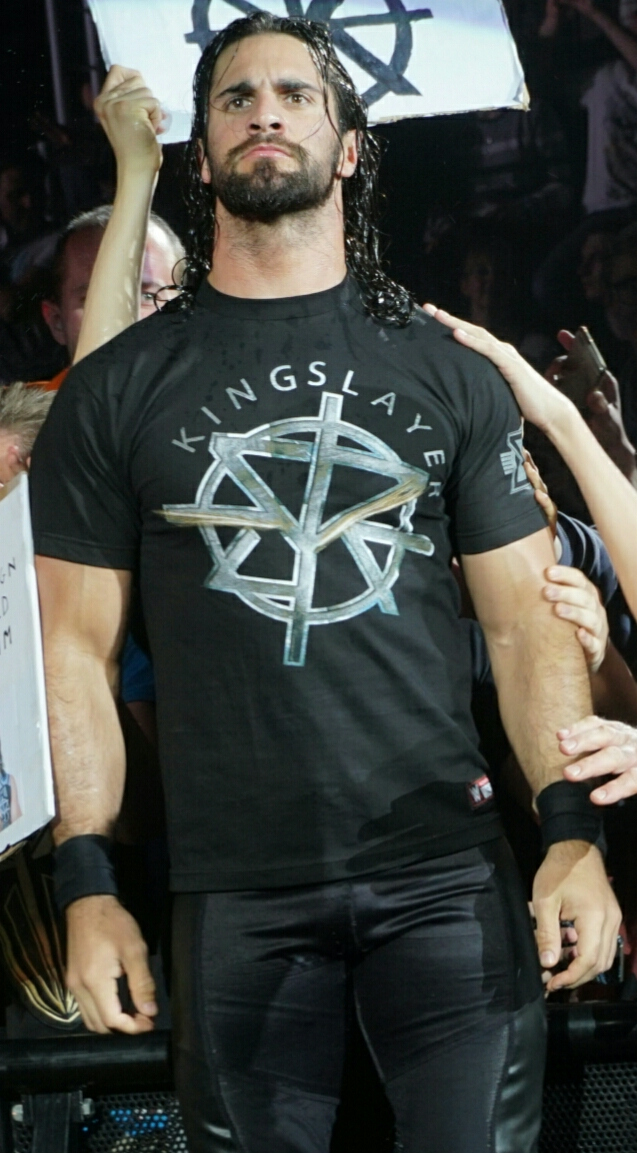
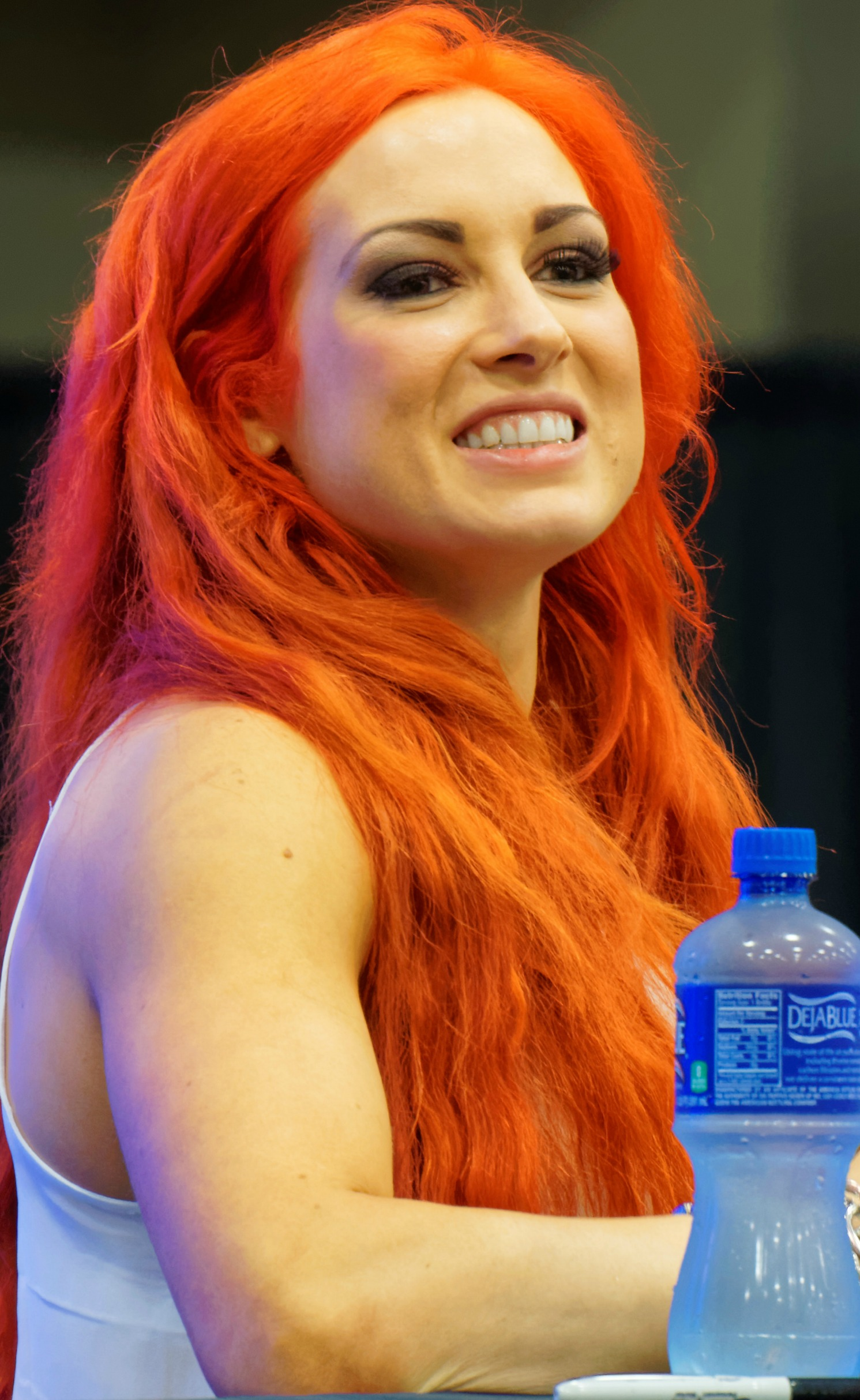
Raw's Seth Rollins and SmackDown's Becky Lynch were the respective winners of the men's and women's Royal Rumble matches.

The main event was the 30-man Royal Rumble match for a world championship match at WrestleMania 35. Elias began the match at number one and was interrupted by WWE Hall of Famer Jeff Jarrett, entering the match at number 2. Elias bashed a guitar on Jarrett before eliminating him. NXT North American Champion Johnny Gargano, WWE United Kingdom Champion Pete Dunne and Aleister Black were surprise entrants at #6, #18, and #21 respectively. Curt Hawkins (entrant #9) was knocked out by Samoa Joe (entrant #8), but went underneath the ring. Titus O'Neil (entrant #11) did not trip underneath the ring, like he did at the Greatest Royal Rumble. However, O'Neil chased Hawkins underneath the ring and back inside where Hawkins eliminated O'Neil, only to be eliminated by Joe. No Way Jose was quickly eliminated by Joe in two seconds. Kofi Kingston (entrant #12) saved himself from elimination two separate times, but was eliminated alongside Xavier Woods (entrant #17) by Drew McIntyre (entrant #16). Bobby Lashley (entrant #26) was quickly eliminated by Seth Rollins (entrant #10) in eleven seconds, and performed a spinebuster on Rollins through an announce table before Braun Strowman entered at #27. As #30 entrant R-Truth made his entrance, he was attacked by Nia Jax, who took his spot and eliminated Mustafa Ali. Jax then received a superkick from Dolph Ziggler, a "619" from Rey Mysterio, and an "RKO" from Randy Orton before being eliminated by Mysterio. Jax became the fourth woman to enter a men's Royal Rumble match, the first person to compete in both the men's and women's Royal Rumble matches in the same night, and the first to score eliminations in both matches. Orton then eliminated Mysterio before being eliminated by Andrade, bringing the final four to Andrade, Ziggler, Strowman, and Rollins. Ziggler, Andrade, and Rollins tried to eliminate Strowman, only for Strowman to eliminate Andrade and Ziggler. In the end, Rollins and Strowman battled on the ring apron, which ended with Rollins winning when Rollins performed a Stomp on Strowman, eliminating him from the match, and earning Rollins a world championship match at WrestleMania 35.

== Aftermath ==
=== Raw ===
The following night on Raw, Raw Women's Champion Ronda Rousey issued an open challenge that was answered by Bayley. After retaining, women's Royal Rumble match winner Becky Lynch made her entrance and confronted Rousey. After recapping their rivalry that began at Survivor Series, Lynch chose to face Rousey for the Raw Women's Championship at WrestleMania 35.

Seth Rollins celebrated his Royal Rumble match victory. Triple H then came out and congratulated him, but said that Rollins needed to choose which champion he wanted to face at WrestleMania 35 by the end of the night. Backstage, Braun Strowman, the runner up in the Royal Rumble match, confronted Rollins and told him he "earned it", and to "make the right decision". Later, Rollins confronted Brock Lesnar. After an ensuing brawl, Rollins chose to face Lesnar for the Universal Championship at WrestleMania 35.

=== SmackDown ===
On the following SmackDown, Becky Lynch addressed how everything had changed for her since winning the women's Royal Rumble match. Charlotte Flair then came out and congratulated Lynch and stated that although Lynch won, she was never truly in the match in the first place, and that Lynch would not be where she was at if it were not for Flair. An ensuing brawl broke out between Flair and Lynch until referees separated them.

As compensation for not being able to compete in the men's Royal Rumble match, R-Truth was granted a United States Championship match against new champion Shinsuke Nakamura. Truth defeated Nakamura to win the title, which led to Rusev coming out and declaring that Truth was not worthy of the title. Rusev then challenged Truth for the title, but was also defeated. After the match, Rusev turned heel and, along with Nakamura, attacked Truth.

Daniel Bryan, along with his new ally Rowan, revealed a new custom WWE Championship belt, made from hemp and wood. He was then interrupted by AJ Styles, which prompted Jeff Hardy, Samoa Joe, Randy Orton, and Mustafa Ali to come out and challenge Bryan for the title. After an ensuing brawl, Triple H announced that Bryan would defend the title against the five at the Elimination Chamber pay-per-view inside the Elimination Chamber. Ali, however, was replaced by Kofi Kingston after suffering an injury.

New SmackDown Tag Team Champions The Miz and Shane McMahon celebrated their title win along with Miz's father. Later that night, The Usos (Jey Uso and Jimmy Uso) defeated Heavy Machinery (Otis Dozovic and Tucker Knight), Sheamus and Cesaro, and The New Day (represented by Big E and Kofi Kingston) in a fatal four-way tag team elimination match to become the number one contenders for the titles at Elimination Chamber.

=== 205 Live ===
On the February 5, 2019, episode of 205 Live, Akira Tozawa won a fatal four-way elimination match to earn another title match against WWE Cruiserweight Champion Buddy Murphy on the Elimination Chamber Kickoff pre-show.

This would be the only Royal Rumble to include the 205 Live brand, as in September, 205 Live merged under NXT. Also at that time and until September 2021, NXT was elevated to WWE's third main brand, and its championships, the NXT Championship and NXT Women's Championship, became eligible choices for the Rumble winners at the next two Royal Rumble events.

== Results ==
No.	Results	Stipulations	Times
1^{P}	Bobby Roode and Chad Gable defeated Scott Dawson and Rezar (with Drake Maverick) by pinfall	Tag team match Had Dawson and Rezar won, both The Revival and AOP would have received a Raw Tag Team Championship match.	6:55
2^{P}	Shinsuke Nakamura defeated Rusev (c) (with Lana) by pinfall	Singles match for the WWE United States Championship	10:15
3^{P}	Buddy Murphy (c) defeated Kalisto, Akira Tozawa, and Hideo Itami by pinfall	Fatal four-way match for the WWE Cruiserweight Championship	12:05
4	Asuka (c) defeated Becky Lynch by submission	Singles match for the WWE SmackDown Women's Championship	17:10
5	The Miz and Shane McMahon defeated The Bar (Cesaro and Sheamus) (c) by pinfall	Tag team match for the WWE SmackDown Tag Team Championship	13:20
6	Ronda Rousey (c) defeated Sasha Banks by pinfall	Singles match for the WWE Raw Women's Championship	13:55
7	Becky Lynch won by last eliminating Charlotte Flair	30-woman Royal Rumble match for a world championship match at WrestleMania 35	1:12:00
8	Daniel Bryan (c) defeated AJ Styles by pinfall	Singles match for the WWE Championship	24:35
9	Brock Lesnar (c) (with Paul Heyman) defeated Finn Bálor by submission	Singles match for the WWE Universal Championship	8:40
10	Seth Rollins won by last eliminating Braun Strowman	30-man Royal Rumble match for a world championship match at WrestleMania 35	57:35
(c) / – the champion(s) heading into the match; P / – the match was broadcast on the pre-show

=== Women's Royal Rumble match entrances and eliminations ===
– Raw
– SmackDown
– NXT
– NXT UK
– 205 Live
– Unbranded
– Winner

Draw	Entrant	Brand/Status	Order	Eliminated by	Time	Eliminations
1	Lacey Evans	Unbranded	11	Charlotte Flair	29:20	2
2	Natalya	Raw	23	Nia Jax	56:01	2
3	Mandy Rose	SmackDown	9	Naomi	25:50	1
4	Liv Morgan	Raw	1	Natalya	00:08	0
5	Mickie James	Raw	2	Tamina	11:38	0
6	Ember Moon	Raw	24	Alexa Bliss	52:10	0
7	Billie Kay	SmackDown	4	Lacey Evans	09:25	1
8	Nikki Cross	Unbranded	3	Billie Kay and Peyton Royce	09:00	0
9	Peyton Royce	SmackDown	5	Lacey Evans	08:38	1
10	Tamina	Raw	7	Charlotte Flair	08:22	1
11	Xia Li	NXT	6	Charlotte Flair	04:48	0
12	Sarah Logan	Raw	8	Natalya and Kairi Sane	05:38	0
13	Charlotte Flair	SmackDown	29	Becky Lynch	50:01	5
14	Kairi Sane	NXT	15	Ruby Riott	17:00	1
15	Maria Kanellis	205 Live	12	Alicia Fox	08:12	0
16	Naomi	SmackDown	10	Mandy Rose*	01:28	1
17	Candice LeRae	NXT	14	Ruby Riott	09:35	0
18	Alicia Fox	Raw	13	Ruby Riott	06:55	1
19	Kacy Catanzaro	NXT	16	Rhea Ripley	10:45	0
20	Zelina Vega	SmackDown	18	Rhea Ripley	11:42	0
21	Ruby Riott	Raw	20	Bayley	13:08	3
22	Dana Brooke	Raw	17	Rhea Ripley	07:17	0
23	Io Shirai	NXT	22	Nia Jax	13:21	0
24	Rhea Ripley	NXT UK	21	Bayley	07:55	3
25	Sonya Deville	SmackDown	19	Alexa Bliss	04:26	0
26	Alexa Bliss	Raw	25	Bayley and Carmella	12:59	2
27	Bayley	Raw	27	Nia Jax and Charlotte Flair	14:27	3
28	Becky Lynch **	SmackDown	—	Winner	13:20	2
29	Nia Jax	Raw	28	Becky Lynch	11:59	3
30	Carmella	SmackDown	26	Charlotte Flair	07:12	1

(*) - Mandy Rose was already eliminated when she eliminated Naomi.

(**) - Lana came out as the #28 entrant, but a storyline ankle injury suffered on the pre-show kept her from competing. Becky Lynch was allowed by Fit Finlay to take her spot after Carmella entered the match, with the clock already running on Lana.

=== Men's Royal Rumble match entrances and eliminations ===
– Raw
– SmackDown
– NXT
– NXT UK
– Unbranded
– Hall of Famer (HOF)
– Winner

Draw	Entrant	Brand/ Status	Order	Eliminated by	Time	Eliminations
1	Elias	Raw	5	Seth Rollins	15:07	1
2	Jeff Jarrett	HOF	1	Elias	01:20	0
3	Shinsuke Nakamura	SmackDown	8	Mustafa Ali	17:46	1
4	Kurt Angle	Raw (HOF)	2	Shinsuke Nakamura	03:15	0
5	Big E	SmackDown	4	Samoa Joe	06:01	0
6	Johnny Gargano	NXT	9	Dean Ambrose	13:50	1
7	Jinder Mahal	Raw	3	Johnny Gargano	00:30	0
8	Samoa Joe	SmackDown	14	Mustafa Ali	24:05	3
9	Curt Hawkins	Raw	7	Samoa Joe	04:09	1
10	Seth Rollins	Raw	—	Winner	43:00	3
11	Titus O'Neil	Raw	6	Curt Hawkins	00:05	0
12	Kofi Kingston	SmackDown	12	Drew McIntyre	08:53	0
13	Mustafa Ali	SmackDown	23	Nia Jax	30:05	2
14	Dean Ambrose	Raw	13	Aleister Black	14:42	1
15	No Way Jose	Raw	10	Samoa Joe	00:02	0
16	Drew McIntyre	Raw	22	Dolph Ziggler and Braun Strowman	20:06	4
17	Xavier Woods	SmackDown	11	Drew McIntyre	00:03	0
18	Pete Dunne	NXT UK	17	Drew McIntyre	11:13	0
19	Andrade	SmackDown	27	Braun Strowman	26:30	1
20	Apollo Crews	Raw	15	Baron Corbin	05:47	0
21	Aleister Black	NXT	16	Baron Corbin	06:09	1
22	Shelton Benjamin	SmackDown	20	Braun Strowman	09:21	0
23	Baron Corbin	Raw	19	Braun Strowman	07:19	2
24	Jeff Hardy	SmackDown	21	Braun Strowman and Drew McIntyre	07:55	0
25	Rey Mysterio	SmackDown	25	Randy Orton	12:30	1
26	Bobby Lashley	Raw	18	Seth Rollins	00:13	0
27	Braun Strowman	Raw	29	Seth Rollins	14:37	6
28	Dolph Ziggler	Raw	28	Braun Strowman	11:34	1
29	Randy Orton	SmackDown	26	Andrade	06:00	1
30	Nia Jax *	Raw	24	Rey Mysterio	03:09	1

(*) - The original #30 entrant was R-Truth, but he was attacked and replaced by Nia Jax before he could compete.
