= Aleister Black =

Dutch professional wrestler (born 1985)

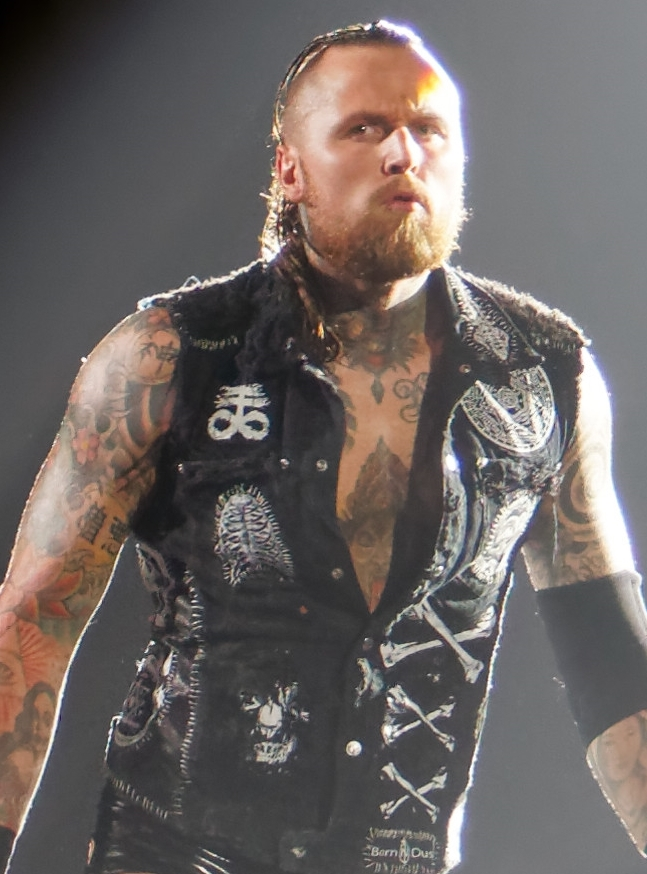
- Black in 2017

Personal information
- Born: Tom Büdgen; 19 May 1985 (age 41) Amsterdam, Netherlands
- Spouse: Thea Büdgen (m. 2018)

Professional wrestling career
- Ring name(s): Aleister Black; Malakai Black; Tommy End
- Billed height: 6 ft 0 in (183 cm)
- Billed weight: 215 lb (98 kg)
- Billed from: "The Lodge in Amsterdam"; Amsterdam, Holland; Amsterdam, Netherlands
- Trained by: Bob Schrijber; Chris Hero; Johnny Kidd; Mike Quackenbush; Nigel McGuinness
- Debut: 18 June 2002

Tom Büdgen (born 19 May 1985) is a Dutch professional wrestler. He was performed on the independent circuit under the ring name Tommy End. He is signed to WWE, where he performs under the ring name Aleister black on Smackdown brand.

Before signing with WWE, Büdgen was known for his extensive work on the independent circuit under the ring name Tommy End, working for promotions across Europe, the United States, and Japan. He most notably wrestled for Insane Championship Wrestling (ICW), Progress Wrestling, Pro Wrestling Guerrilla (PWG), and Westside Xtreme Wrestling (wXw), holding numerous championships such as the wXw Unified World Heavyweight Championship, wXw World Lightweight Championship, wXw World Tag Team Championship, ICW Tag Team Championship, and Progress Tag Team Championship.

Büdgen joined WWE's NXT brand in April 2017, debuting at NXT TakeOver: Orlando as Aleister Black. He won the NXT Championship once and the Dusty Rhodes Tag Team Classic once (with Ricochet) before he was moved to the Raw brand, and was later drafted to the SmackDown brand. He then appeared sporadically before being released in 2021. From 2021 to 2025, Black was signed to All Elite Wrestling (AEW), where he performed under the ring name Malakai Black. as the leader of the House of Black stable, he held the AEW World Trios Championship once with Brody King and Buddy Matthews before his departure in 2025. He returned to WWE later that year, but was released again in 2026.

== Early life ==
Tom Büdgen was born on 19 May 1985 in Amsterdam, Netherlands. He has an extensive background in martial arts, having trained in kickboxing, pencak silat, and Muay Thai, the former and lattermost under fellow compatriot Bob Schrijber and former world champions Liam Harrison and Andy Howson, all of which he would later incorporate into his wrestling style.

== Professional wrestling career ==
=== Independent circuit (2002–2016) ===
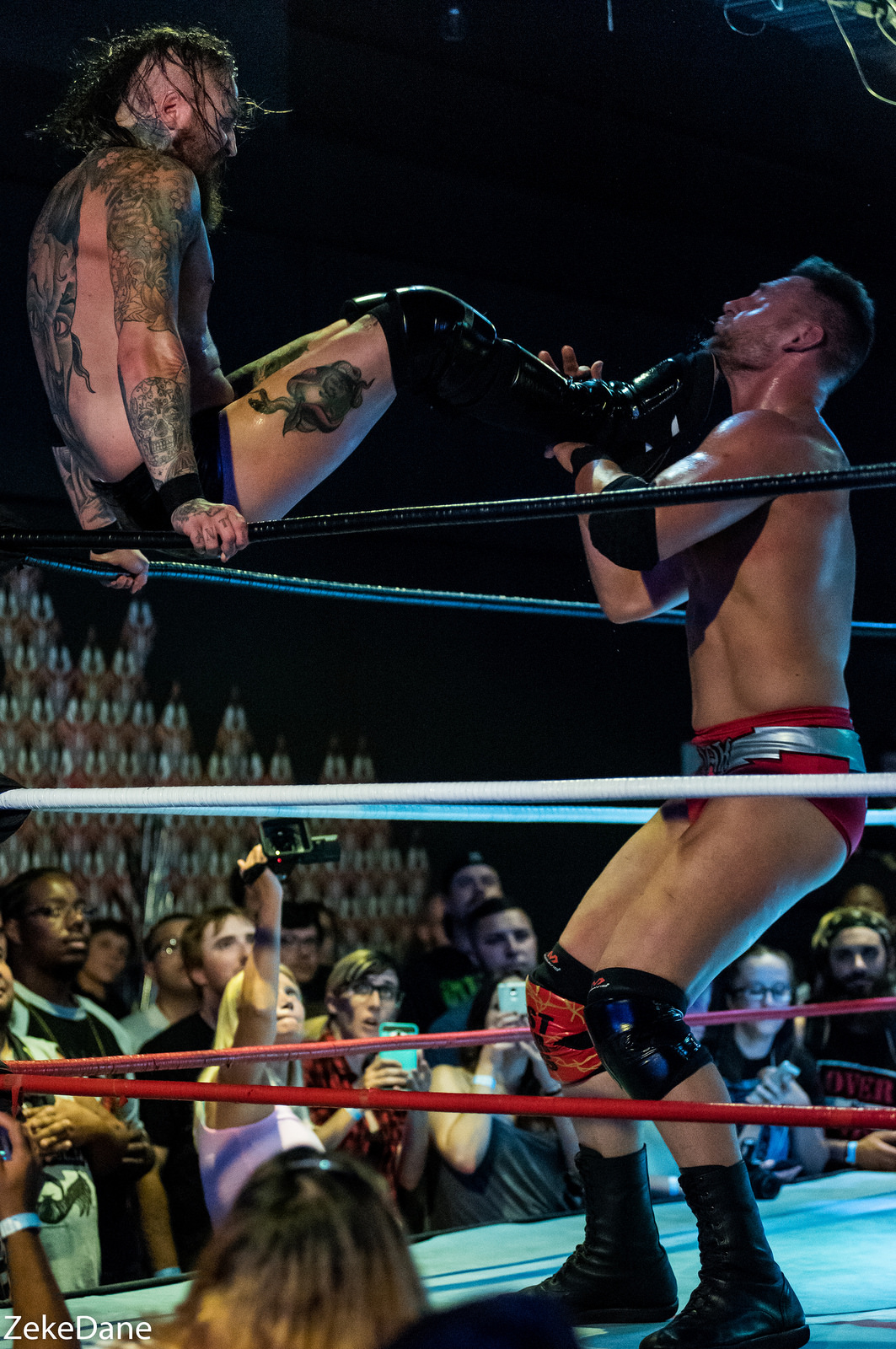
Tommy End wrestling Donovan Dijak in 2016

Under the ring name Tommy End, Büdgen wrestled extensively on the European independent circuit starting with his debut on 18 June 2002, working for promotions such as Pro Wrestling Holland (PWH) and Pro Wrestling Showdown (PWS) in the Netherlands, Progress Wrestling and Revolution Pro Wrestling (RPW) in England, Insane Championship Wrestling (ICW) in Scotland, Over the Top Wrestling (OTT) in Ireland, and Westside Xtreme Wrestling (wXw) in Germany, as well as under the Union of European Wrestling Alliance umbrella, among others. He also wrestled for Big Japan Pro Wrestling (BJW) in Japan and Combat Zone Wrestling (CZW), Evolve, and Pro Wrestling Guerrilla (PWG) in the United States. He held numerous championships and is a former wXw Unified World Heavyweight Champion, wXw World Light Heavyweight Champion, wXw World Tag Team Champion, ICW Tag Team Champion, and Progress Tag Team Champion. He challenged Drew Galloway for the ICW World Heavyweight Championship, Bad Bones for the UEWA European Heavyweight Championship, Davey Richards for the ROH World Championship and Marty Scurll for the Progress World Championship.

=== WWE ===
==== NXT (2016–2019) ====
In June 2016, it was reported that Büdgen had signed with WWE, and he reported to the WWE Performance Center on 19 October. On 7 January 2017, he debuted the new ring name, Aleister Black. On 15 January, he made a surprise appearance as Tommy End at the United Kingdom Championship Tournament finals, losing to Neville in a non-tournament match.

Vignettes began to air from the 8 March episode of NXT, promoting Black's television debut. Black made his televised in-ring debut at NXT TakeOver: Orlando on 1 April, defeating Andrade "Cien" Almas. Black wrestled on the following Takeover events, defeating Hideo Itami at NXT TakeOver: Brooklyn III, Velveteen Dream, at NXT TakeOver: WarGames, and Adam Cole in an Extreme Rules match at NXT TakeOver: Philadelphia.

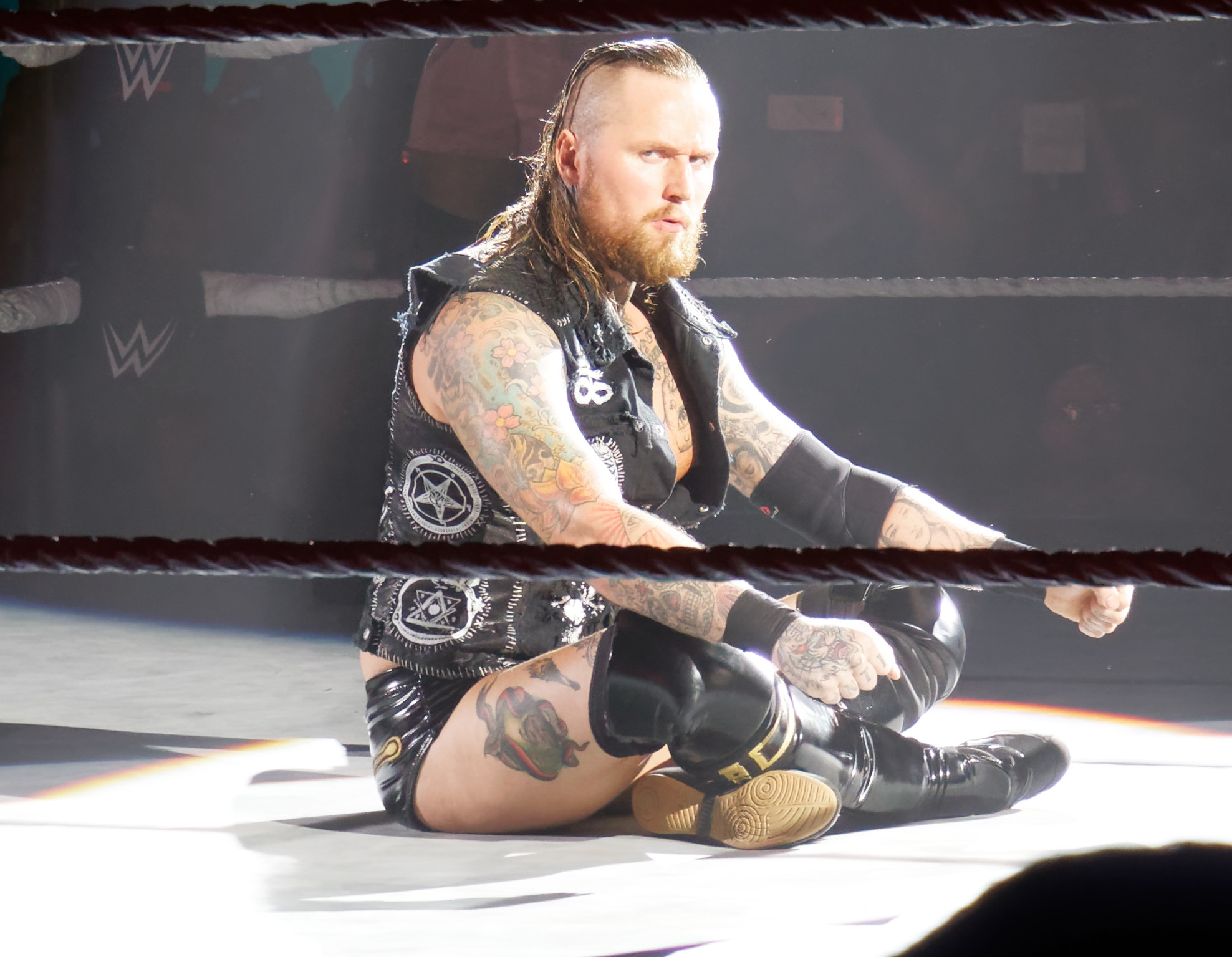
Black performing his in-ring pose in May 2017

Black won the NXT Championship from Andrade "Cien" Almas at NXT TakeOver: New Orleans on 7 April. While he retained the belt against Lars Sullivan, at NXT TakeOver: Chicago II, Black lost the title on 25 July episode of NXT to Tommaso Ciampa, ending his reign at 108 days.

While he was booked to wrestle Ciampa and Johnny Gargano at NXT TakeOver: Brooklyn 4, he was removed from television that same day. After being out of action for two months, Black returned on 17 October episode of NXT, confronting Nikki Cross, who revealed that Johnny Gargano was the one who had attacked him. A match between Black and Gargano was scheduled for NXT TakeOver: WarGames, in which Black was victorious. At NXT TakeOver: Phoenix on 26 January 2019, Black failed to regain the NXT Championship from Tommaso Ciampa. The next night at the Royal Rumble, he entered the Royal Rumble match at number 21, but was eliminated by Baron Corbin. In March, Black formed a tag team with Ricochet and the two won the 2019 Dusty Rhodes Tag Team Classic. At NXT TakeOver: New York on 5 April, Black and Ricochet unsuccessfully faced The War Raiders for the NXT Tag Team Championship in what would be Black's final NXT appearance.

==== Main roster (2019–2021) ====
On 18 February 2019, Black made his official Raw debut, defeating Elias. Black also continued his team with Ricochet, and the duo competed in a Raw Tag Team Championship match at Fastlane that featured Bobby Roode and Chad Gable, and The Revival (Dash Wilder and Scott Dawson), but failed to win. Black and Ricochet also competed for the SmackDown Tag Team Championship in a fatal four-way match the following month at WrestleMania 35, but were again unsuccessful.

As part of the Superstar Shake-up on 15 April, Black was drafted to the Raw brand, however on 22 April Black was drafted to the SmackDown brand due to his real-life wife Zelina Vega being drafted there, therefore splitting him from Ricochet. Black then began appearing in ominous backstage promos in a dark room, awaiting a challenger. On 9 July episode of SmackDown, his challenge was eventually accepted, with the mystery opponent to be revealed as Cesaro. Their match would take place at Extreme Rules on 14 July, as Black's first singles pay-per-view match since joining the main roster, where Black defeated Cesaro.

As part of the 2019 Draft in October, Black was drafted to the Raw brand. Over the following weeks, Black would develop a winning streak, squashing his opponents. On 18 November episode of Raw, Buddy Murphy went to Black's locker room to challenge him, but Black was absent and Murphy claimed that Black was all talk and no fight. The following week, Black appeared and attacked Murphy after his match. A match between Black and Murphy was scheduled for TLC: Tables, Ladders & Chairs, which Black won. At the Royal Rumble pay-per-view on 26 January 2020, Black entered the Royal Rumble match at number 28, but was eliminated by Seth Rollins.

On 24 February episode of Raw, Black was attacked by The O.C. (AJ Styles, Luke Gallows, and Karl Anderson) backstage. The next week on Raw, Black faced The O.C. members in separate matches, and suffered his first pinfall loss on the main roster, to AJ Styles. At Elimination Chamber on 8 March, Black defeated Styles in a no disqualification match, with interference from The Undertaker. At WrestleMania 36, on night two of the event, Black defeated Bobby Lashley after an accidental distraction by Lashley's manager and in-storyline wife Lana. On 20 April episode of Raw, Black defeated Austin Theory to qualify for the Money in the Bank ladder match at Money in the Bank. At the event, COVID-19 pandemic restraints forced the match to be changed to a cinematic match with a "Corporate Ladder" gimmick in which the titular briefcase was suspended above a ring on the roof of WWE's headquarters, with the competitors starting on the ground floor and fighting their way to the roof. Black failed to win the match, which was also notable for a sequence where Black and Rey Mysterio were thrown off the roof by Baron Corbin.

Following this, Black began a feud with Seth Rollins and Murphy after Rollins injured Rey Mysterio's eye. On 27 July episode of Raw, Murphy injured Black's right eye by driving it through the steel steps. On the 24 August episode of Raw, Black, now wearing an eye bandage, returned during The Kevin Owens Show and attacked Kevin Owens, turning heel for the first time in his career. The following week on Raw he attacked Owens again with his Black Mass finishing move before a match against Randy Orton which Owens lost. On the 14 September episode of Raw, Owens defeated Black. Owens would go on again to defeat Black, via disqualification, on the 28 September episode of Raw. On the 12 October episode of Raw, Black would lose again to Owens in a No Disqualification match, ending the feud. As part of the 2020 Draft in October, Black was drafted to the SmackDown brand. However, following the draft, Black would disappear from television for six months. After his absence, he returned on the 23 April 2021 episode of SmackDown in a vignette promoting his return. After several weeks of vignettes, Black officially returned on the 21 May episode of SmackDown, attacking Big E with the Black Mass which allowed Apollo Crews to retain the Intercontinental Championship in the main event, in what would be his final appearance with WWE in his first stint. Black was originally planned to feud with Big E as a result, but it never came to fruition as Black was released from the company on 2 June.

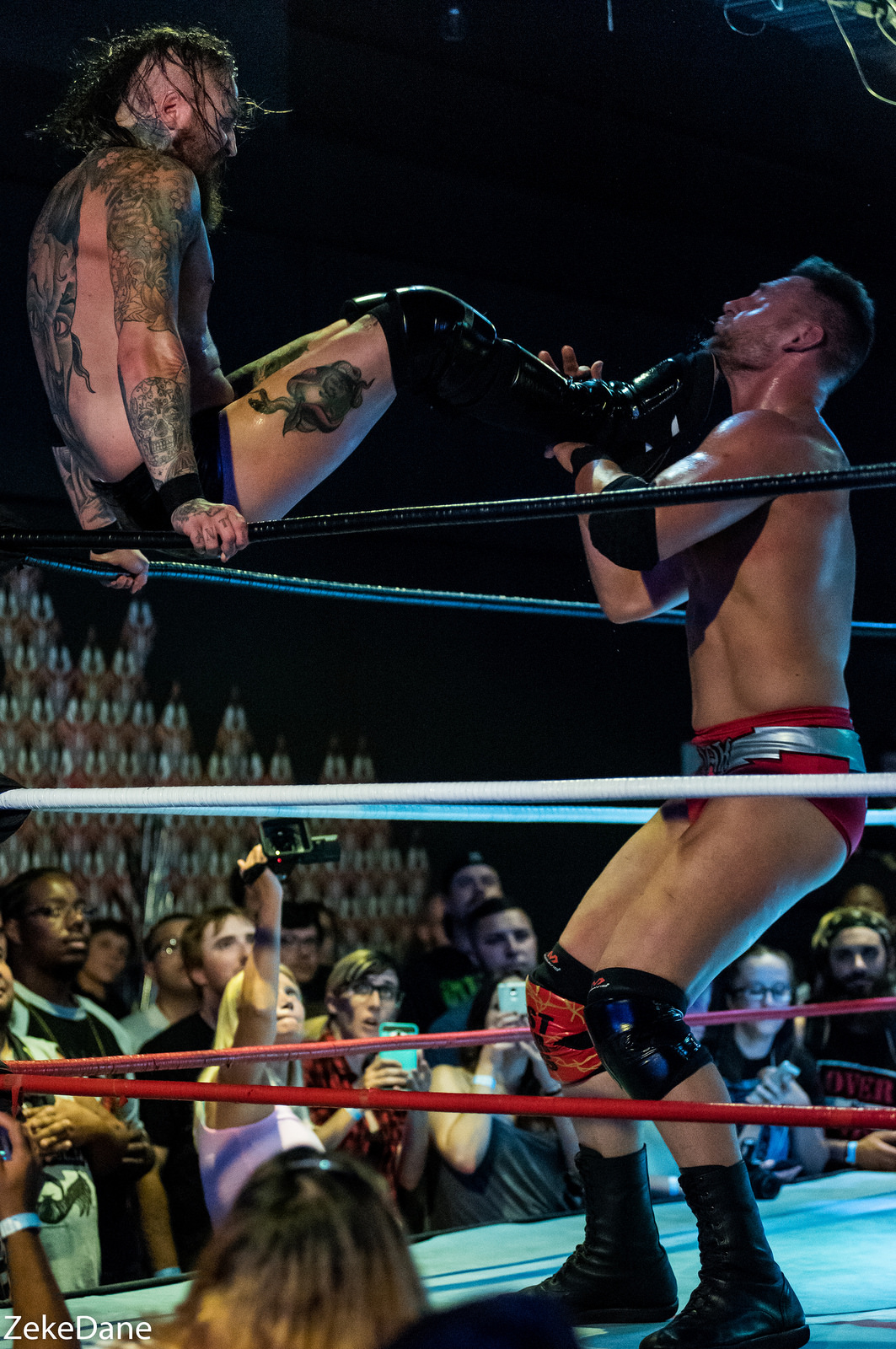

=== All Elite Wrestling (2021–2025) ===
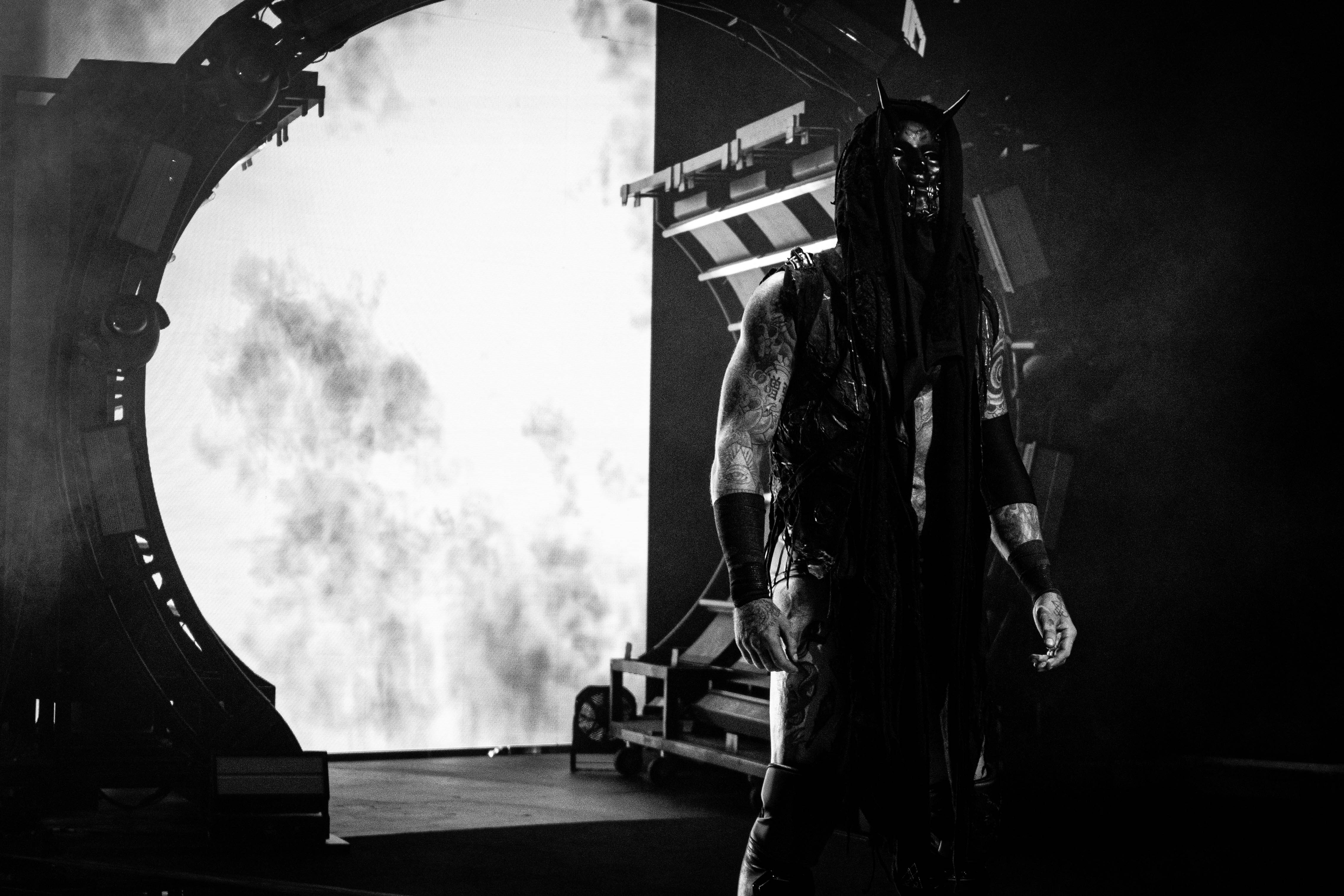
Black at the 2022 Forbidden Door

On the 7 July 2021 episode of Dynamite, entitled Road Rager, Büdgen made his debut for All Elite Wrestling (AEW) under the ring name Malakai Black, attacking both Arn Anderson and Cody Rhodes with the Black Mass, cementing himself as a villainous character. During the special Homecoming episode of Dynamite on 4 August, Black made his in-ring AEW debut defeating Rhodes. After the match, Black attacked Rhodes once again, laying him out after hitting him in the back with a crutch. Black would face Rhodes in a rematch at Grand Slam on 22 September, defeating him once again. On the 23 October episode of Dynamite, Black suffered his loss in AEW at the hands of Rhodes in a no disqualification match. On 14 November at Full Gear, Black teamed with Andrade El Idolo in a losing effort to Rhodes and Pac.

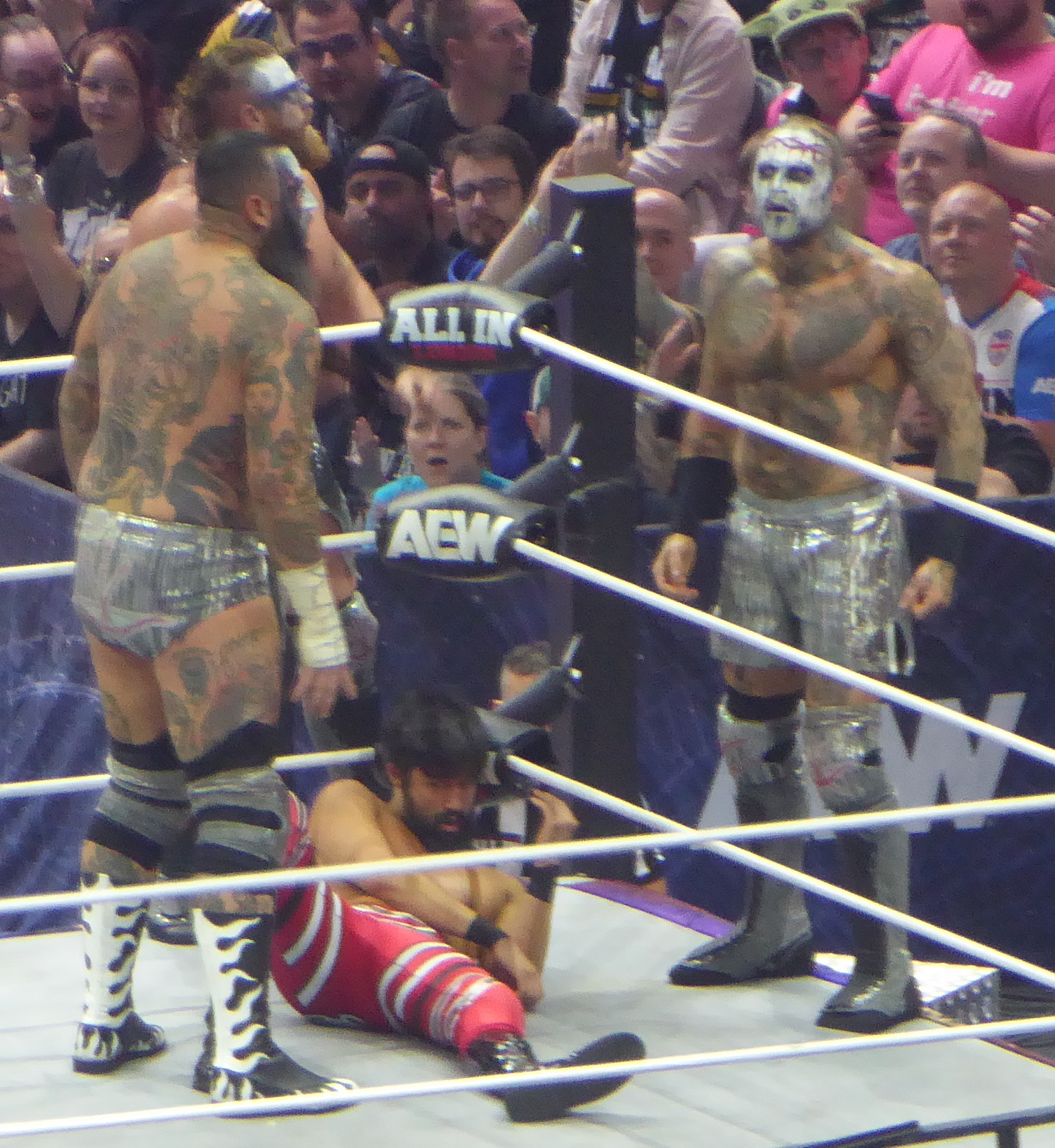
House of Black (Black, Brody King, and Buddy Matthews) menacing Wheeler Yuta (bottom) at the 2024 All In.

In early 2022, Black began feuding with the Varsity Blonds (Brian Pillman Jr. and Griff Garrison) and the Death Triangle (Pac and Penta El Zero Miedo). On the 12 January 2022 edition of Dynamite, Brody King debuted and joined Black, forming a tag team called the Kings of the Black Throne, which later expanded into a larger faction called the House of Black. On the 23 February edition of Dynamite, Buddy Matthews made his debut as the third House of Black member. At Revolution's pre-show on 4 March, the House of Black would win in a trios match against the team of the Death Triangle and Erick Redbeard, with Black pinning Redbeard for the victory. At Double or Nothing in May, Julia Hart would join the group after helping them beat the Death Triangle in a six-man tag team match. At Forbidden Door, Black competed in a four-way match to determine the inaugural AEW All-Atlantic Champion, but failed to win. At the All Out event on 5 September, House of Black were defeated by Darby Allin, Sting and Miro. Following this, Black took a leave of absence, after initially asking for his release from his AEW contract.

Black made his return along with the House of Black on the 23 November episode of Dynamite, and the group began a feud with The Elite (Kenny Omega, Matt Jackson, and Nick Jackson) in March 2023. At Revolution on 5 March, the House of Black defeated the Elite to win the AEW World Trios Championship. The House of Black successfully defended the championship against The Acclaimed (Max Caster, Anthony Bowens and Billy Gunn) in a "House Rules" match at Double or Nothing in May. At All In: London on 27 August, the House of Black were defeated by the Acclaimed in a "House Rules" No Holds Barred match, ending their reign at 175 days. At Full Gear on 18 November, Black and King competed in a four-way ladder match for the AEW World Tag Team Championship, which was won by Ricky Starks and Big Bill.

At Dynasty in April 2024, the House of Black defeated Adam Copeland, Eddie Kingston, and Mark Briscoe in a six-man tag match. At Double or Nothing on 26 May 2024, Black then unsuccessfully challenged Copeland for the AEW TNT Championship in a barbed wire steel cage match in what was his only singles match on an AEW pay-per-view. On the 15 June episode of Collision, the House of Black won a #1 contenders' match for The Patriarchy's AEW World Trios Championships. After the match, Patriarchy leader Christian Cage appeared on the titantron and revealed that they had attacked Matthews with a con-chair-to, turning the entire House of Black stable face for the first time. On 25 August at All In, the House of Black participated in the ladder match for the AEW World Trios Championships, but failed to win. On 23 November at Full Gear, Kings of the Black Throne participated in a four-way tag team match for the AEW World Tag Team Championships, but failed to win in what would be his final match in AEW. On 10 February 2025, it was reported that Black's contract had expired and he would be departing the company.

=== Return to independent circuit (2021–2025) ===
Malakai Black made his surprise return to Pro Wrestling Guerrilla (PWG) at Mystery Vortex 7, the promotion's first event since 2019, on 1 August 2021, by aiding Brody King in rescuing the PWG World Champion Bandido from an assault by Super Dragon, Black Taurus and Demonic Flamita. Black announced that he would be back the following month and King said that he would follow Black where he would go, thus forming a tag team called Kings of the Black Throne. At Threemendous VI, Kings of the Black Throne defeated Taurus and Flamita to win the vacant World Tag Team Championship. After departing AEW, Black quietly vacated the tag titles due to returning to WWE.

=== Return to WWE (2025–2026) ===
On 25 April 2025 episode of SmackDown, after weeks of vignettes teasing his return, Büdgen, reverting back to his Aleister Black name, made his return to WWE, hitting The Miz with a Black Mass, becoming an official member of the SmackDown roster. The following week on SmackDown, Black defeated The Miz in his in-ring return. Black then began a feud with Damian Priest, defeating him in a Last Man Standing match on 10 October episode of SmackDown with the help of his real-life wife Zelina Vega. On the 2 January 2026 episode of SmackDown, Black lost to Priest in a Ambulance match ending their feud.

In February 2026, Black entered a brief feud with Randy Orton with both men trading wins over each other; Black was reportedly penciled-in to form an alliance with Orton heading into WrestleMania 42, however WWE’s parent company TKO opted to use Pat McAfee instead. Black made his final WWE appearance on the 17 April of SmackDown in the 2026 André the Giant Memorial Battle Royal, where he was eliminated by eventual winner Royce Keys. On 24 April, it was reported that both Black and Vega were released from their WWE contracts.

=== Second return to independent circuit (2026–present) ===
On 6 September 2026, Büdgen, reverting to his Malakai Black name, made his return to Progress Wrestling on night 3 of The Odyssey Tour, where he defeated Cara Noir to win the Progress Men's World Championship for the first time. Following the match, Black dedicated his victory to Andy "The Butcher" Williams, who had died the previous day. He lost the title back to Noir at Chapter 198 on 27 September, ending his reign at 21 days. After the match, Black announced that he would be reverting back to performing as Tommy End. Tommy made his House of Glory (HOG) debut at Salvation on 9 October, teaming with his wife Xelina to defeat Lio Rush and Shotzi Blackheart.

== Other media ==
Büdgen is a playable character as Aleister Black in the video games WWE 2K18 as DLC, WWE 2K19, WWE 2K20, WWE 2K25 as DLC, and WWE 2K26 and as Malakai Black in AEW Fight Forever.

== Personal life ==
On 23 November 2018, Büdgen married Puerto Rican-American professional wrestler Thea Trinidad, better known by the ring name Zelina Vega. Despite being an atheist, he is interested in religious studies, particularly surrounding the occult.

== Championships and accomplishments ==
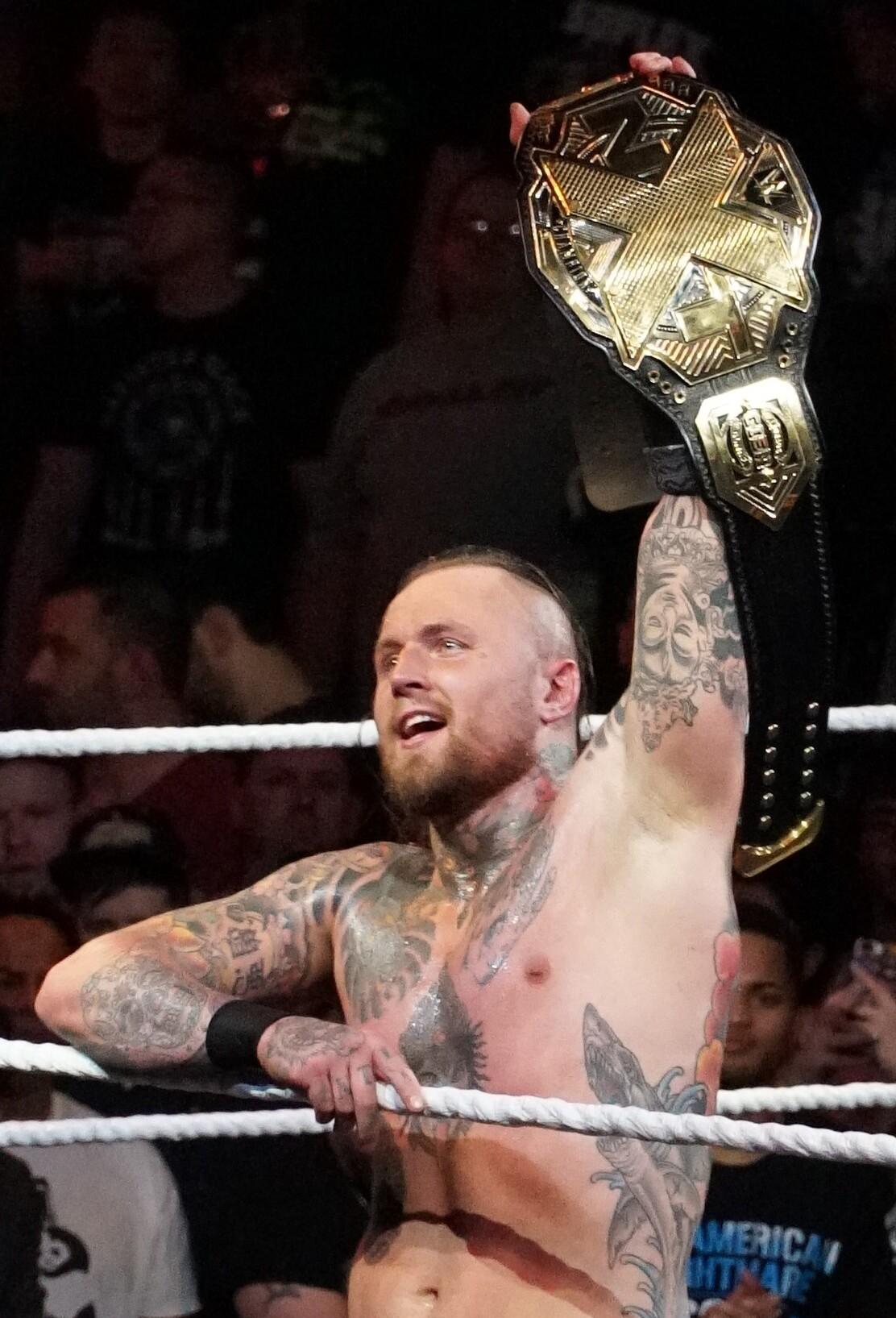
Black is a former one-time NXT Champion

- Adriatic Special Combat Academy
  - Super 8 Cup II (2013)
- All Elite Wrestling
  - AEW World Trios Championship (1 time) – with Brody King and Buddy Matthews
- Catch Wrestling Norddeutschland
  - CWN Mittelgewichtsmeisterschaft Championship (1 time, inaugural)
- Dutch Wrestling Federation
  - DWF Cruiserweight Championship (1 time, inaugural, final)
- Fiend Wrestling Germany
  - FWG Lightweight Championship (1 time)
  - FWG Lightweight Title Tournament (2009)
- Fight Club: PRO
  - FCP Championship (1 time)
- Freestyle Championship Wrestling
  - FCW Deutschland Lightweight Championship (1 time)
- Insane Championship Wrestling
  - ICW Tag Team Championship (1 time) – with Michael Dante
  - ICW "Match of the Year" Bammy Award (2015) – for Legion (Tommy End, Mikey Whiplash, and Michael Dante) vs New Age Kliq (BT Gunn, Chris Renfrew, and Wolfgang) at Fear & Loathing VIII
- International Catch Wrestling Alliance
  - ICWA Heavyweight Championship (1 time)
  - ICWA World Junior Heavyweight Champion (1 time)
  - ICWA European Tag Team Championship/NWA European Tag Team Championship (1 time) – with Michael Dante
- Pro Wrestling Guerrilla
  - PWG World Tag Team Championship (1 time, final) – with Brody King
- Pro Wrestling Holland
  - PWH Tag Team Championship (1 time) – with Michael Dante
- Pro Wrestling Illustrated
  - Ranked No. 23 of the top 500 singles wrestlers in the PWI 500 in 2020
- Pro Wrestling Showdown
  - PWS Heavyweight Championship (1 time)
- Progress Wrestling
  - Progress Men's World Championship (1 time)
  - Progress Tag Team Championship (1 time) – with Michael Dante
  - Super Strong Style 16 (2016)
- Southside Wrestling Entertainment
  - SWE Tag Team Championship (1 time) – with Michael Dante
- Westside Xtreme Wrestling
  - wXw Unified World Wrestling Championship (1 time)
  - wXw World Lightweight Championship (2 times)
  - wXw World Tag Team Championship (2 times) – with Michael Dante
  - 16 Carat Gold Tournament (2013, 2015)
  - Chase The Mahamla (2011)
  - World Lightweight Tournament (2006)
- WWE
  - NXT Championship (1 time)
  - NXT Year-End Award (3 times)
    - Male Competitor of the Year (2017)
    - Breakout Star of the Year (2017)
    - Rivalry of the Year (2017) – vs. Velveteen Dream
  - Dusty Rhodes Tag Team Classic (2019) – with Ricochet
