= All Out (2021) =

All Elite Wrestling pay-per-view event

- Promotional poster featuring various AEW wrestlers
- Promotion: All Elite Wrestling
- Date: September 5, 2021
- City: Hoffman Estates, Illinois
- Venue: Now Arena
- Attendance: 10,126
- Buy rate: 215,000
- Tagline: Where Champions Are Made

Pay-per-view chronology
← Previous; Double or Nothing	Next → Full Gear

All Out chronology
← Previous; 2020	Next → 2022

The 2021 All Out was a professional wrestling pay-per-view (PPV) event produced by All Elite Wrestling (AEW). It was the third annual All Out and took place during Labor Day weekend on September 5, 2021, at the Now Arena in the Chicago suburb of Hoffman Estates, Illinois. It was the first All Out event to be held on a Sunday. It was also AEW's first pay-per-view held outside of Daily's Place in Jacksonville, Florida since the start of the COVID-19 pandemic in March 2020. The event aired through traditional PPV providers, as well as on B/R Live in North America and FITE TV internationally.

Ten matches were contested at the event, including one on the Buy In pre-show. In the main event, Kenny Omega defeated Christian Cage to retain the AEW World Championship. In other prominent matches, CM Punk defeated Darby Allin (which was also Punk's AEW debut match and Punk's first professional wrestling match in seven years); Chris Jericho defeated MJF in a career threatening match; Lucha Brothers (Penta El Zero Miedo and Rey Fénix) defeated The Young Bucks (Matt Jackson and Nick Jackson) in a steel cage match to win the AEW World Tag Team Championship; Dr. Britt Baker, D.M.D. defeated Kris Statlander to retain the AEW Women's World Championship; and Miro defeated Eddie Kingston to retain the AEW TNT Championship in the opening bout. The event also saw the AEW debuts of Minoru Suzuki, Adam Cole, Ruby Soho (who won the women's Casino Battle Royale), and Bryan Danielson.

Tickets for All Out sold out within a day, and the event was attended by over 10,000 people. It also received over 200,000 pay-per-view buys, making it the most bought non-WWE professional wrestling PPV event since 1999.

All Out received critical acclaim, particularly for the cage match and the newsworthy surprise debuts, and was also highly rated by fans. Since its initial airing, All Out has been hailed as one of the greatest wrestling pay-per-views of all time.

== Production ==
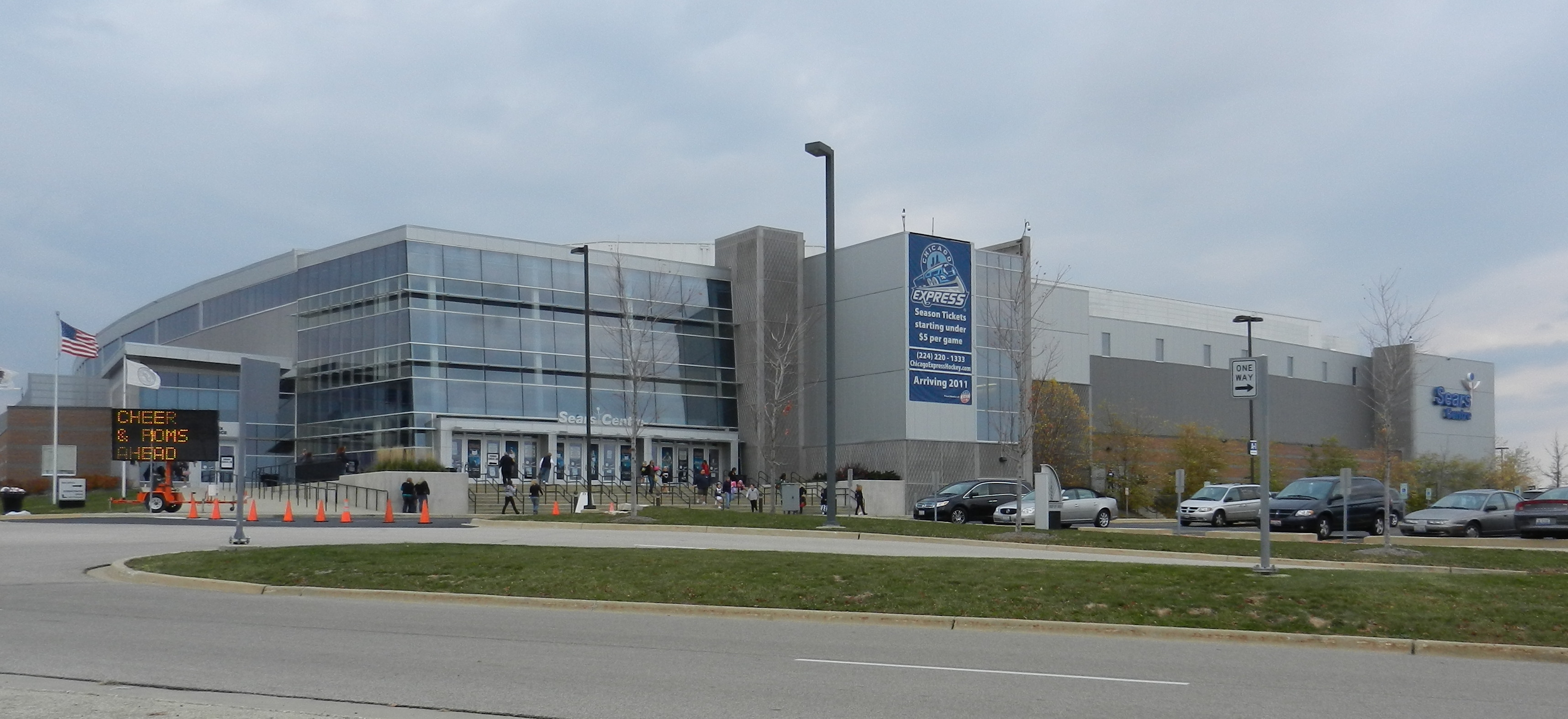
The 2021 event returned All Out to the Now Arena (formerly Sears Centre Arena) in the Chicago suburb of Hoffman Estates, Illinois, marking All Elite Wrestling's first pay-per-view event held outside of Jacksonville, Florida since the start of the COVID-19 pandemic in March 2020 as the company resumed live touring in July 2021.

=== Background ===
All Out is a professional wrestling pay-per-view (PPV) event held annually during Labor Day weekend by All Elite Wrestling (AEW) since 2019. It is one of AEW's "Big Four" PPVs, which also includes Double or Nothing, Full Gear, and Revolution, their four biggest domestic shows produced quarterly. Announced on May 31, 2021, the third All Out event was scheduled to be held on September 5 in the Chicago suburb of Hoffman Estates, Illinois, returning the event to the Now Arena (formerly Sears Centre Arena), which is where the inaugural All Out was held. It was AEW's first PPV held outside of Daily's Place and the adjacent TIAA Bank Field in Jacksonville, Florida since the start of the COVID-19 pandemic in March 2020, following AEW's resumption of live touring in July 2021. Presale tickets were available July 8 before they went on sale on July 9 to the general public and quickly sold out.

Following the September 3 episode of Friday Night Rampage, AEW's second weekly TV show that premiered in August, TNT aired a half-hour television special called Countdown to All Out which averaged 361,000 viewers. "Champion Sound" by Cypress Hill was the official theme song for the event.

=== Storylines ===
All Out featured professional wrestling matches that involved different wrestlers from pre-existing feuds and storylines. Storylines were produced on AEW's weekly television programs, Wednesday Night Dynamite and Friday Night Rampage, the supplementary online streaming shows, Dark and Elevation, and The Young Bucks' YouTube series Being The Elite.

Kenny Omega has held the AEW World Championship since December 2, 2020, when he captured the title from Jon Moxley at Winter Is Coming. In March 2021, when Christian Cage was about to make his first Dynamite appearance, Omega and his manager Don Callis interrupted the segment, eventually leading to a confrontation between Omega and Christian. After Christian racked up eight wins, he was anointed in August 2021 as the number one contender for the AEW World Championship, The match was subsequently scheduled for All Out. Before the event, Christian defeated Omega to win the Impact World Championship on the debut episode of Rampage on August 13, which was Omega's first singles loss since the 2019 Full Gear event.

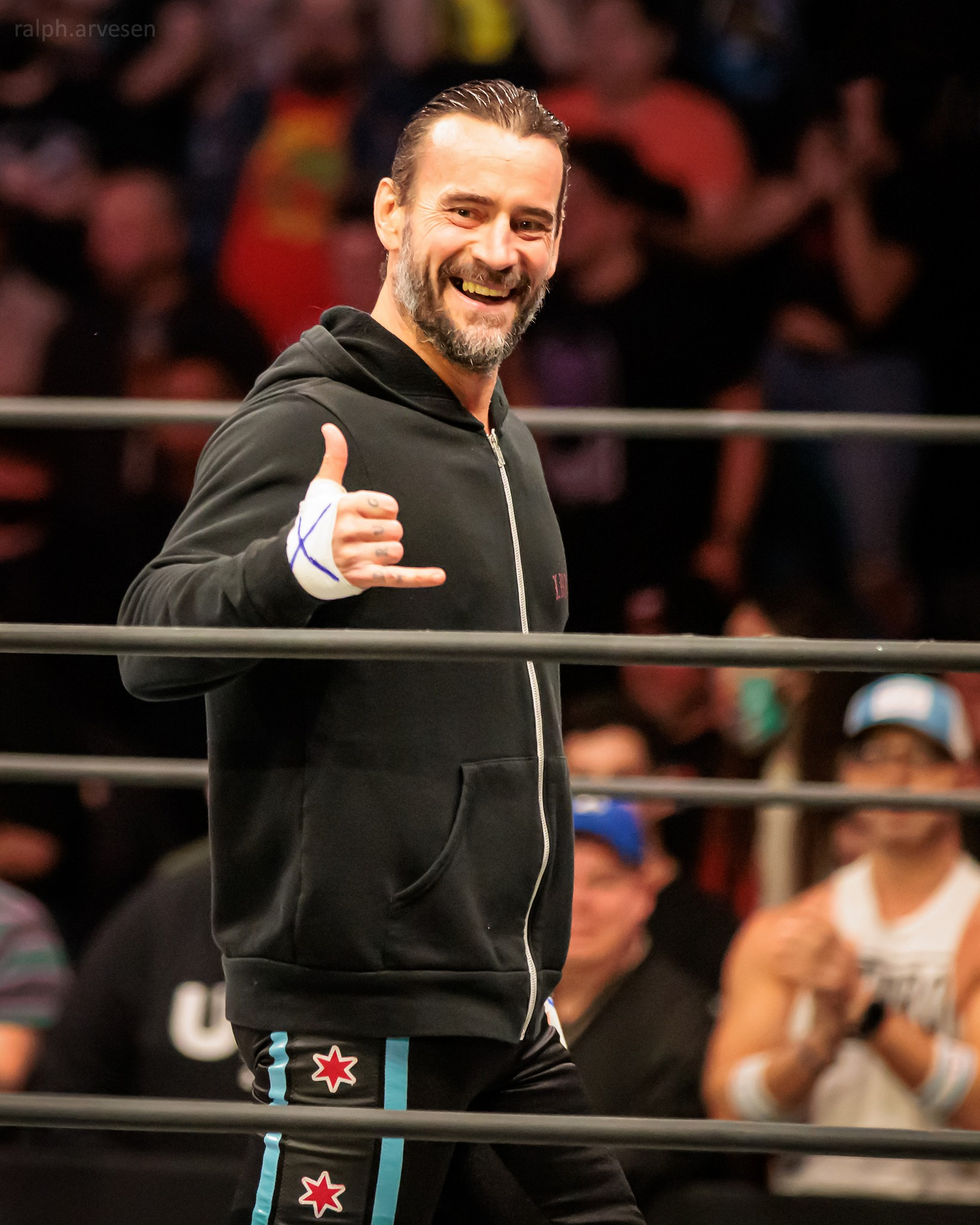
CM Punk wrestled his first AEW match at All Out, which was also his first professional wrestling match since 2014.

Beginning in July 2021, rumors began circulating that former WWE wrestler CM Punk, who had been retired from professional wrestling since 2014, had signed with AEW. At Fight for the Fallen on July 28, Darby Allin announced that he wanted to face the "best in the world", a nickname Punk had used during his time in WWE. At The First Dance on August 20, Punk made his highly anticipated debut for AEW and challenged Allin to a match at All Out.

In September 2020, Maxwell Jacob Friedman (MJF) started a storyline with Chris Jericho on whether MJF could join Jericho's faction, The Inner Circle. At the Full Gear event on November 7, 2020, MJF defeated Jericho, thus per the match stipulation, he joined Jericho's faction. On the March 10, 2021 Dynamite, as Jericho was about to eject MJF from the faction for plotting against him, MJF revealed that he had secretly built his own faction instead: The Pinnacle, which attacked and laid out The Inner Circle. At Blood and Guts on May 5, The Pinnacle defeated The Inner Circle in a Blood and Guts match when MJF threatened to throw Jericho off a steel cage, leading to The Inner Circle surrendering. Despite this, MJF threw Jericho off the cage. When Jericho pursued a singles match against MJF, the latter in July set Jericho a challenge to whereby MJF would choose Jericho's match-types and opponents in a five-match series, but Jericho could not lose any match if he wanted to face MJF in the fifth match. In the "Labors of Jericho" storyline, Jericho beat Shawn Spears, Nick Gage, Juventud Guerrera, and Wardlow, but lost the final match against MJF on the August 18 Dynamite, where everything "Judas" was banned, which included his signature move, the Judas Effect, which MJF used on Jericho. The following week, Jericho challenged MJF to another match at All Out, stipulating that if Jericho lost, he would never wrestle another match in AEW; MJF accepted.

At the inaugural All Out event in 2019, The Lucha Brothers (Penta El Zero Miedo and Rey Fénix) defeated The Young Bucks (Matt Jackson and Nick Jackson) in a ladder match. On November 7, 2020, at Full Gear, The Young Bucks captured the AEW World Tag Team Championship from FTR (Dax Harwood and Cash Wheeler). After The Young Bucks conducted several successful title defenses due to illegal interference by their faction, The Elite, it was announced on the August 18, 2021 episode of Dynamite that The Young Bucks would defend the championship at All Out in a Steel Cage match to prevent any outside interference, and their challengers would be determined by an eliminator tournament consisting of four tag teams. The following week, The Lucha Brothers defeated the Varsity Blonds (Brian Pillman Jr. and Griff Garrison) to advance to the tournament finals, which occurred on the August 27 episode of Rampage, where The Lucha Brothers defeated Jurassic Express (Jungle Boy and Luchasaurus) to qualify for the steel cage tag title match.

On May 30, Dr. Britt Baker, D.M.D. defeated Hikaru Shida at Double or Nothing to win the AEW Women's World Championship. Meanwhile, Kris Statlander returned to television in March 2021 after being out with an anterior cruciate ligament injury since June 2020. Statlander went on a winning streak and eventually became the number one ranked competitor in the women's division; due to this, AEW announced on August 25 that Statlander would challenge Baker for the title at All Out.

Miro defeated Darby Allin for the AEW TNT Championship on the May 12 episode of Dynamite. On the August 25 episode of Dynamite, Miro, as "The Redeemer", challenged Eddie Kingston for being a "sinner". On the August 27 episode of Rampage, after Miro attacked and unmasked Fuego Del Sol, Kingston attacked Miro. A TNT Championship match between the two was scheduled for All Out.

In February 2021, AEW was reported to have established a working relationship with New Japan Pro-Wrestling (NJPW). On the August 25 episode of Dynamite, Jon Moxley said that he had sent out an open challenge to Japanese wrestlers, but only NJPW wrestler Satoshi Kojima had accepted, therefore he and Kojima would wrestle at All Out.

On the August 11 episode of Dynamite, when Q. T. Marshall and his allies attacked the son of commentator Tony Schiavone, fellow commentator Paul Wight came to the aid of the Schiavones. The following week, Wight announced he would face Marshall at All Out, marking his first match in AEW after having signed with the company as a commentator in February.

On September 2, a 10-man tag team match pitting Best Friends (Orange Cassidy, Chuck Taylor, and Wheeler Yuta) and Jurassic Express (Jungle Boy and Luchasaurus) against the Hardy Family Office (Matt Hardy, Private Party (Isiah Kassidy and Marq Quen), and The Hybrid 2 (Angélico and Jack Evans)) was announced for the Buy-In pre-show.

=== Canceled match ===
On the August 11 episode of Dynamite, a match between Andrade El Idolo and Pac was scheduled for All Out. On September 1, it was announced that the match would instead take place on a future episode of Rampage due to Pac having travel issues related to the COVID-19 pandemic in England.

== Event ==
=== The Buy In ===
On the 'Buy-In' pre-show, Best Friends (Chuck Taylor, Orange Cassidy and Wheeler Yuta) and Jurassic Express (Jungle Boy and Luchasaurus) faced the Hardy Family Office (Matt Hardy, Isiah Kassidy, Marq Quen, Angélico and Jack Evans). Luchasaurus performed the Tail Whip on Angélico, after-which Jungle Boy locked Angélico in the Snare Trap hold for the submission victory at 9 minutes and 25 seconds. Post-match, The Butcher made his AEW return by attacking Cassidy, reuniting with The Blade, And joining the Hardy Family Office. Jurassic Express, Varsity Blonds, Dante Martin, and some Dark Order members saved Cassidy from a haircut by The Hardy Family Office.

=== Preliminary matches ===
The commentators for the show were Excalibur, Jim Ross, and Tony Schiavone. The event's ring announcer was Justin Roberts, while the interviewer was Alex Marvez.

In the opening match of the pay-per-view, Miro defended the AEW TNT Championship against Eddie Kingston. When Miro performed a German suplex on Kingston, the latter pulled a turnbuckle pad off. Kingston landed a DDT, but the referee was temporarily distracted by the turnbuckle pad, leading to Miro kicking out of the pin attempt. The referee stopped Kingston from sending Miro into the exposed turnbuckle. With the referee's vision obscured, Miro hit a low blow on Kingston. Miro followed with a roundhouse kick and a Machka Kick (bicycle kick to the head), pinning Kingston at 13 minutes and 25 seconds to win and retain the championship.

Next, Jon Moxley faced NJPW's Satoshi Kojima. Moxley avoided Kojima's lariat and twice performed the Paradigm Shift for the pinfall victory at 12 minutes and 10 seconds. Following the match, Moxley was confronted by NJPW wrestler Minoru Suzuki in Suzuki's unannounced AEW debut. They traded strikes before Suzuki eventually landed a Gotch-style Piledriver to put Moxley down.

The third match saw Britt Baker (accompanied by Jamie Hayter and Rebel) defending the AEW Women's World Championship against Kris Statlander (accompanied by Orange Cassidy). Baker avoided Statlander's Area 451 splash and escaped the Spider Crab submission hold. Statlander kicked out of two pins, one after Baker landed a Pittsburgh Sunrise, and one after Baker landed a curb stomp. Baker applied the Lockjaw hold for the submission victory and successful title defense at 11 minutes and 25 seconds.

In an interview, Andrade El Idolo hyped his future match against PAC.

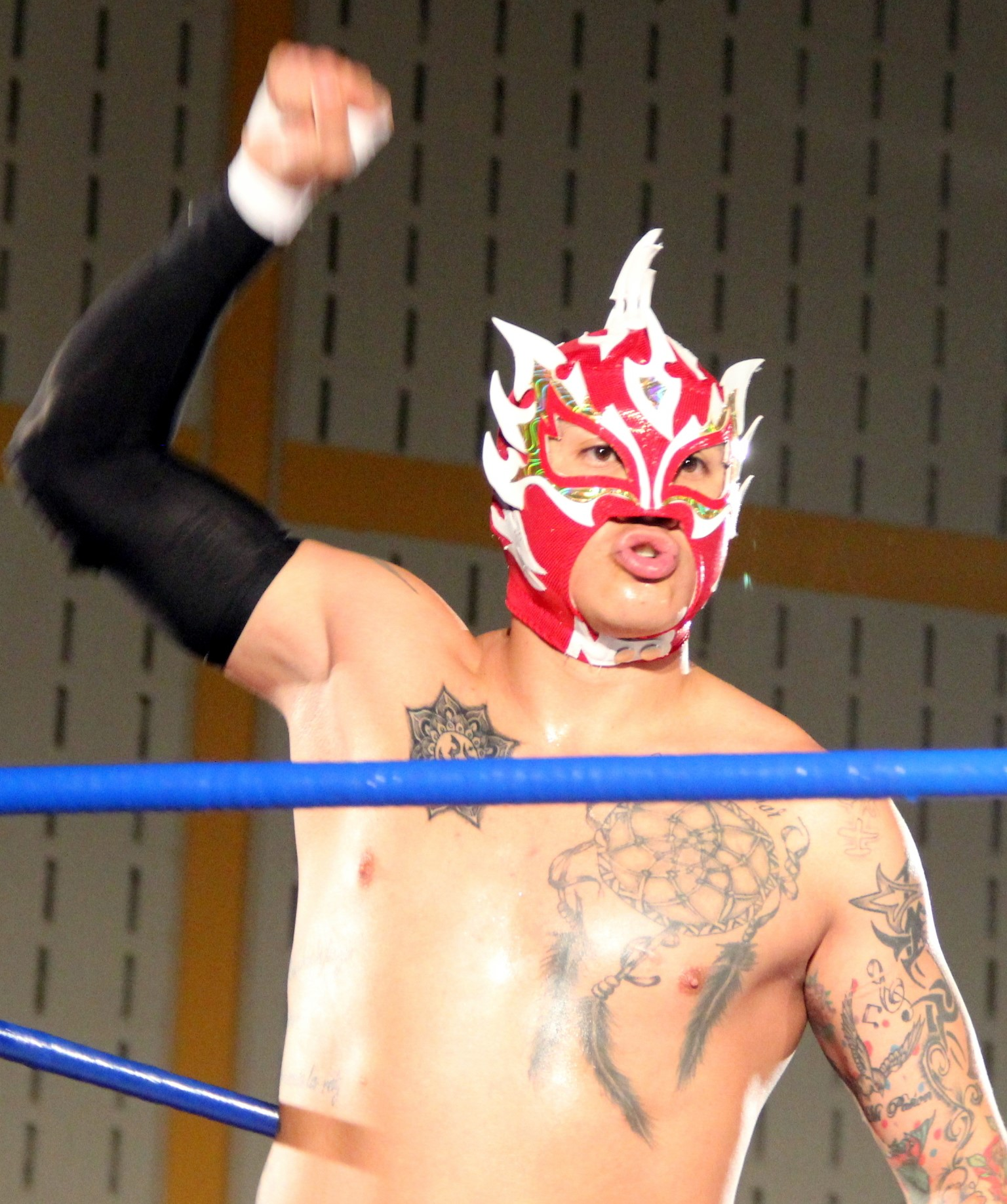
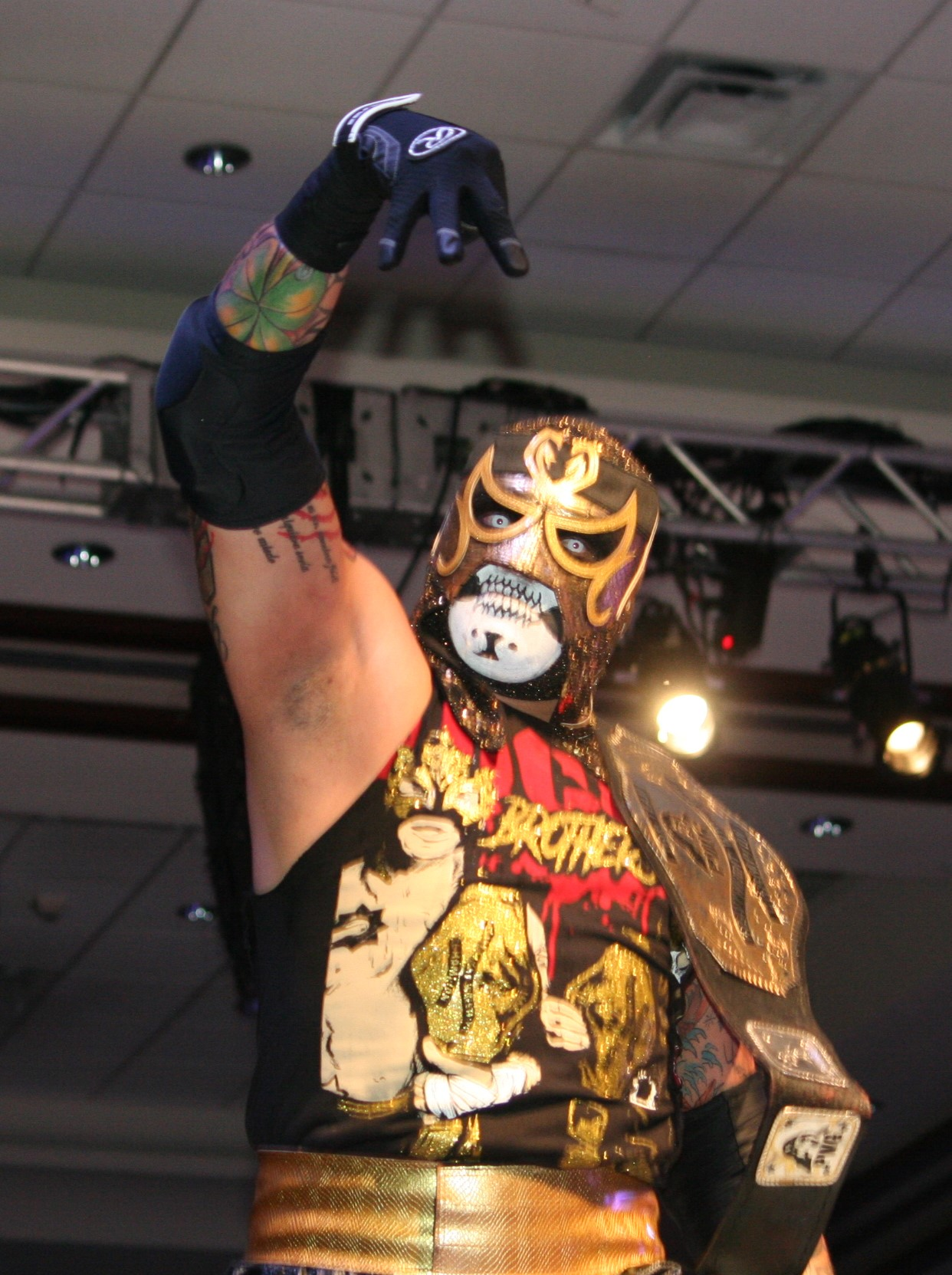
Rey Fénix and Penta El Zero M won the AEW World Tag Team Championship at the event.

Following this was the steel cage match where the Young Bucks (Matt Jackson and Nick Jackson) defended the AEW World Tag Team Championship against the Lucha Brothers (Penta El Zero Miedo and Rey Fénix). The former team were accompanied by Brandon Cutler and had Don Callis join commentary, while the latter team were accompanied by Alex Abrahantes and had rapper Muelas de Gallo perform their entrance theme live. The Young Bucks performed More Bang for Your Buck on Fénix, but Penta broke up the pin. The Young Bucks used a shoe covered in thumbtacks passed to them by Cutler, and then landed a BTE Trigger on Penta, but Fénix broke up the pin. Fénix used the thumbtack shoe, then landed a Black Fire Driver on Matt, but Matt kicked out of the pin. Fénix, Penta and Nick were bloodied. The Lucha Brothers performed a diving stomp into a Fear Factor piledriver on Nick, but Matt broke up the pin. Fénix dove off the top of the cage with a crossbody onto the other three men. Finally the Lucha Brothers performed an LB Driver (aided piledriver) on Nick. Penta pinned Nick at 22 minutes and 5 seconds, with Fénix restraining Matt. As a result, the Lucha Brothers won the match and the titles.

The next match was the 21-woman Casino Battle Royale to determine the next contender for the AEW Women's World Championship. The final entrant was Ruby Soho, making her unannounced AEW debut. The final three women left in the match were Soho, Thunder Rosa and Nyla Rose; Rosa dropkicked Rose off the ring apron to eliminate Rose. On the apron, Soho landed a jumping enzuigiri kick to eliminate Rosa at 22 minutes.

The sixth match saw Chris Jericho facing MJF where Jericho's AEW in-ring career was on the line. Fozzy guitarist Billy Grey performed Jericho's Judas entrance. Jericho powerbombed MJF on the ring apron, damaging MJF's lower back. Wardlow walked towards ringside but was attacked by Jake Hager, drawing out two other referees to stop the brawl, and distracting Aubrey Edwards, the referee in the ring. MJF hit Jericho with Jericho's baseball bat and then a Judas Effect. In a false finish, Edwards counted a successful pin for MJF because she did not see Jericho's foot placed on the bottom rope, but |Paul Turner, one of the referees who had come out, corrected her error and the match was restarted. Jericho countered MJF's Salt of the Earth armbar, later placing MJF in the Walls of Jericho for the submission victory at 21 minutes and 15 seconds. The Inner Circle celebrated Jericho's win.

Next, CM Punk faced Darby Allin, in Punk's return to the professional wrestling ring. When Punk first hit the Go to Sleep, Allin fell to the floor and had to beat the count at nine. Later, Punk sat up to avoid Allin's Coffin Drop, then kicked out of Allin's Last Supper cradle pin attempt. Allin tried for a poison rana, but Punk countered into another Go to Sleep for the pinfall victory at 16 minutes and 40 seconds. Post-match, Sting came out and shook Punk's hand, then Punk shook Allin's hand.

In the penultimate match, Paul Wight faced Q. T. Marshall, who was accompanied by Nick Comoroto and Aaron Solow. Wight fended off Comoroto and Solow, then hit a chokeslam on Marshall, leading to a pinfall victory at 3 minutes and 10 seconds.

Jon Moxley gave a speech hyping his future match against Minoru Suzuki, then Malakai Black gave a speech hyping his future match against Dustin Rhodes.

=== Main event ===
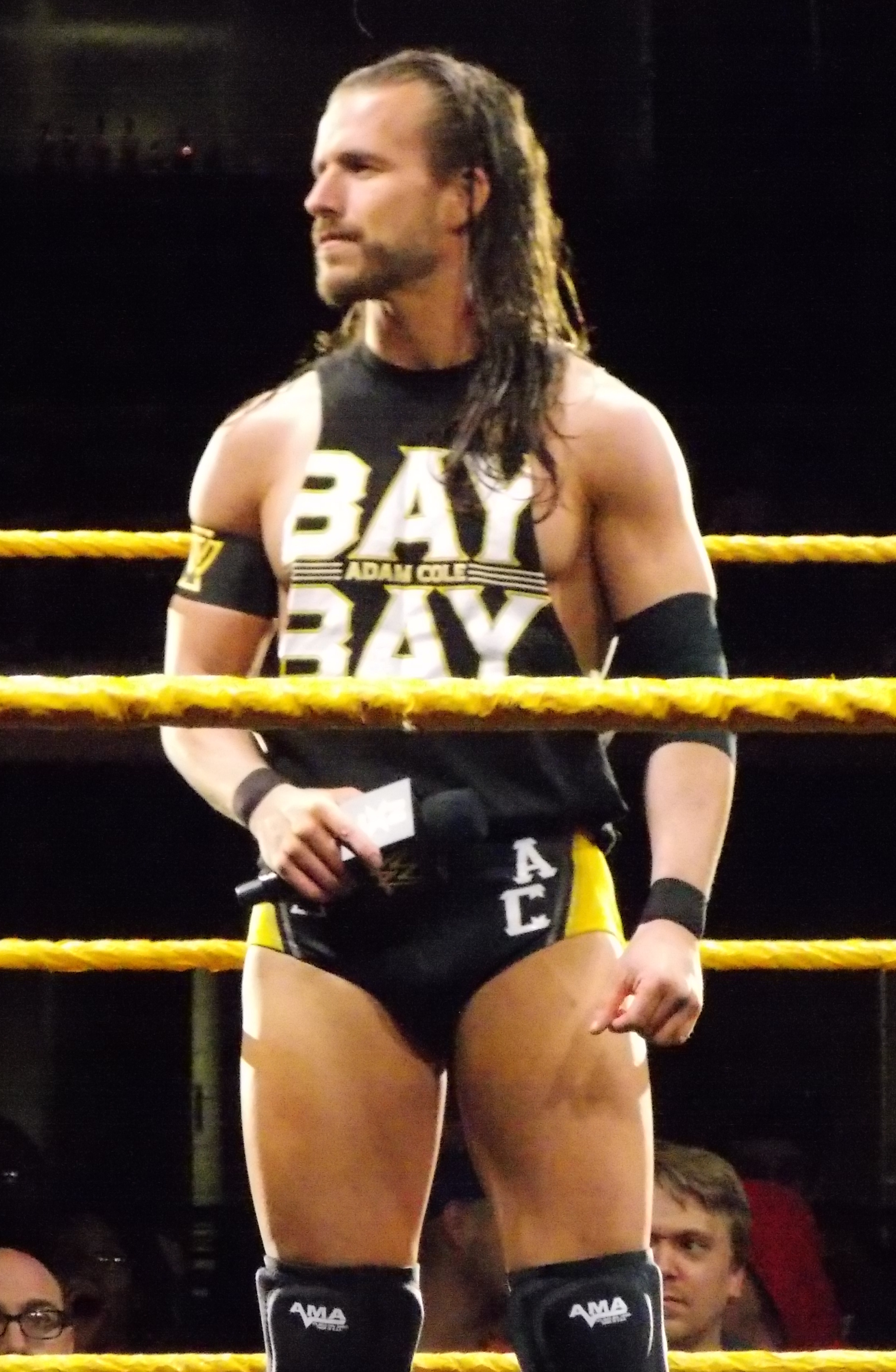
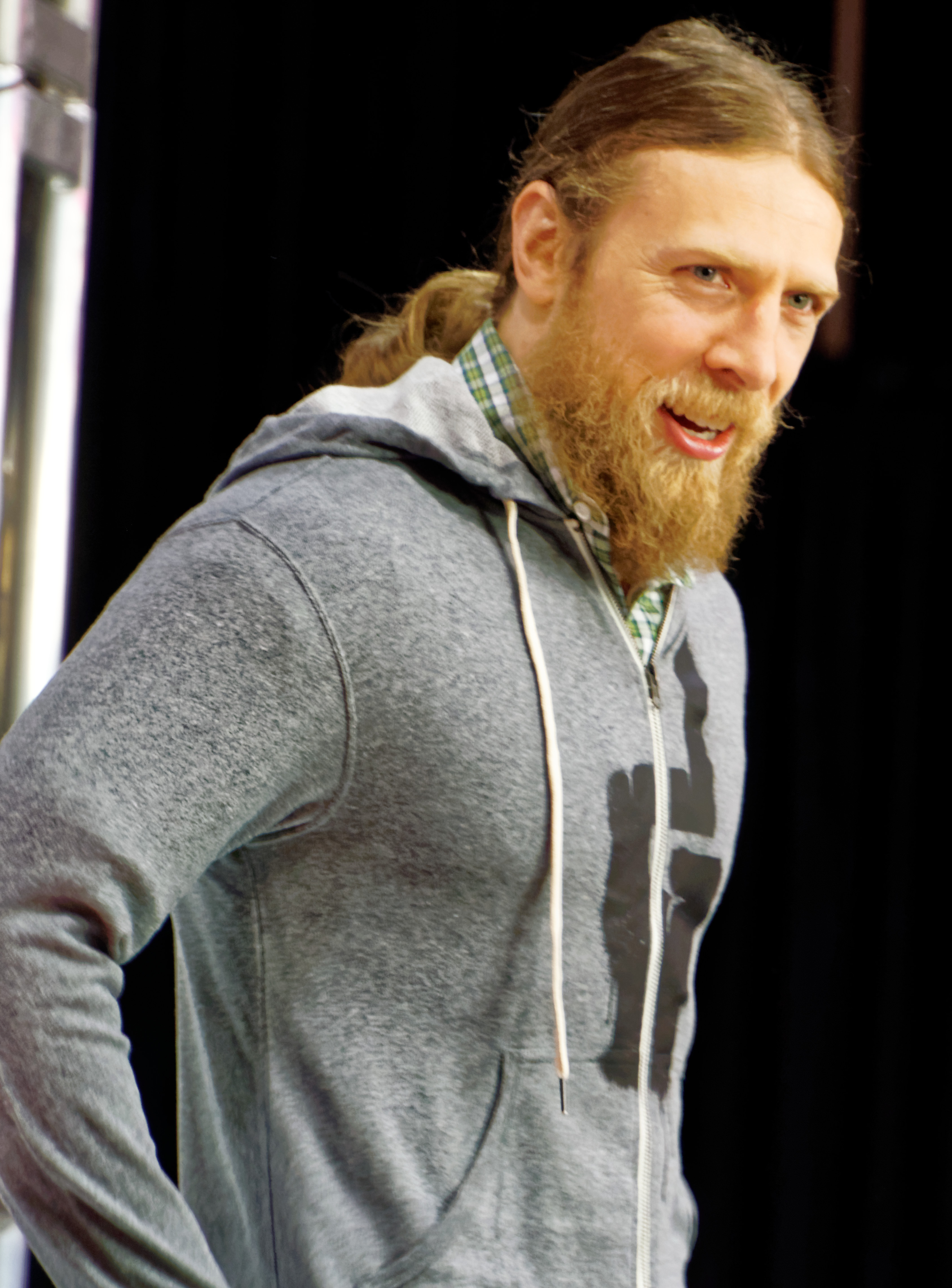
Both Adam Cole (left) and Bryan Danielson (right) made their AEW debuts after the main event.

In the main event, Kenny Omega (accompanied by Don Callis) defended the AEW World Championship against Christian Cage. Christian speared Omega off the ring apron through a table. When Christian applied a high-angle modified cloverleaf hold, Callis called for the Good Brothers (Doc Gallows and Karl Anderson) to interfere, but Christian fended off Anderson and caused Omega to knee Gallows. Christian performed the Killswitch on Omega, but Omega kicked out of the pin. When Christian tried for a Killswitch from the top rope, Omega raked the eyes and performed a One-Winged Angel from the top rope, then pinning Christian at 21 minutes and 20 seconds to win and retain the title.

Post-match, Omega celebrated with the rest of the Elite, including the Young Bucks. When the Elite attacked Christian, Jurassic Express (including Marko Stunt) tried to help, but were overwhelmed. Omega proclaimed that the only people who had a chance of beating him were either not in AEW, retired, or already dead. Omega was interrupted by Adam Cole in his unannounced AEW debut, who superkicked Jungle Boy and embraced the Elite; Cole declared that the Elite were unstoppable. As Omega bid the crowd goodnight, he was interrupted by Bryan Danielson in also his unannounced AEW debut, and his first appearance on television since April 30, 2021, who allied with Christian and Jurassic Express. This reignited a brawl. Omega fled and the Elite lost the brawl, culminating in Danielson's running knee to Nick Jackson's head.

== Reception ==
AEW President and chief executive officer Tony Khan stated after the event that All Out was the most watched AEW PPV ever. Dave Meltzer, writing for the Wrestling Observer Newsletter, stated that All Out did over 205,000 PPV buys, for an estimated $10 million in PPV revenue, of which AEW would receive an estimated $4.01 million. Meltzer further wrote that this was the most bought non-WWE professional wrestling PPV ever since either the WCW 1999 Spring Stampede or 1999 Uncensored PPVs. 10,164 live tickets were sold, earning AEW $700,000.

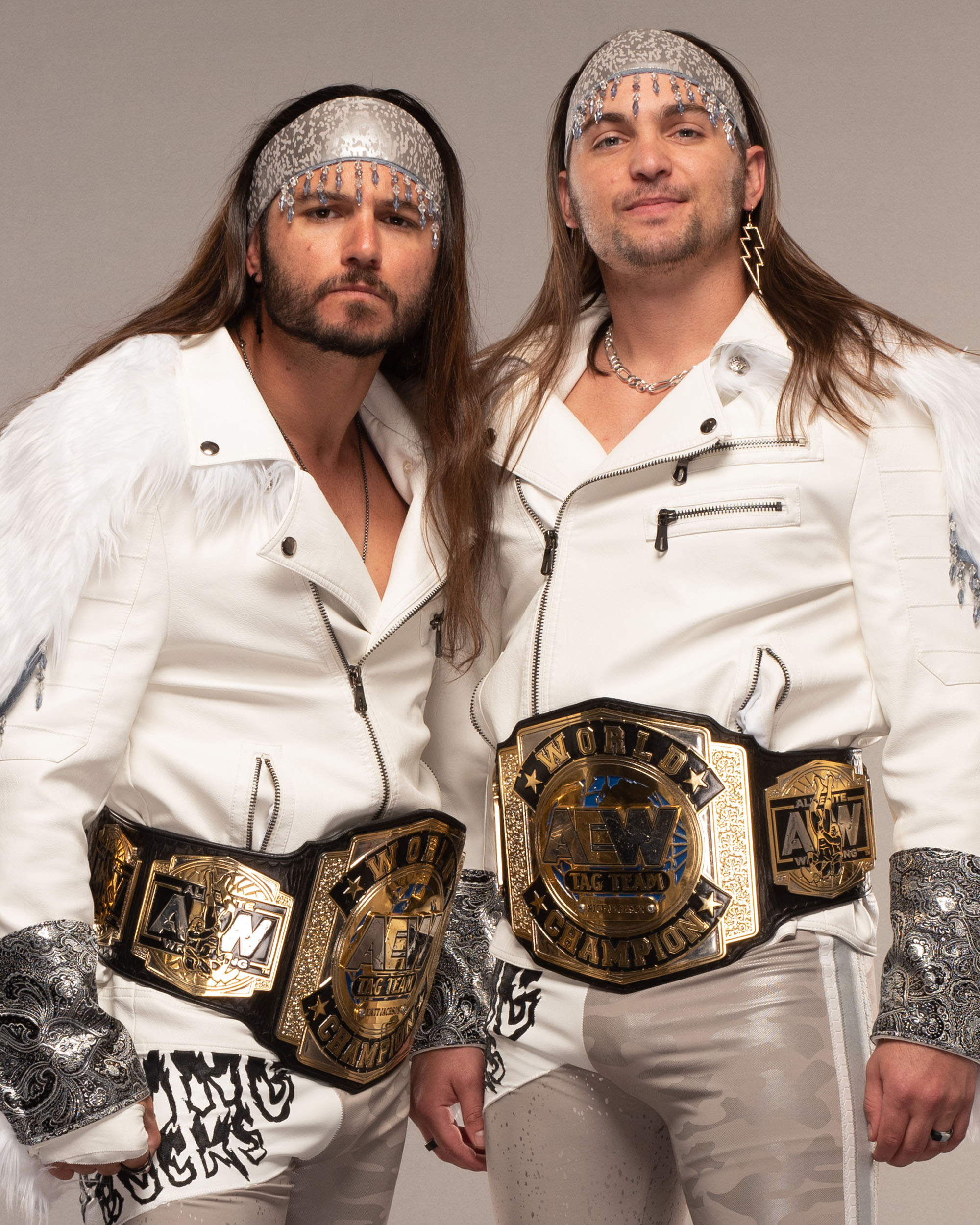
Critics gave high praise to the AEW World Tag Team Championship title defense by the Young Bucks (Matt Jackson at left and Nick Jackson at right).

All Out received critical acclaim, particularly with regard to the cage match and the newsworthy surprise debuts, with many calling it one of the greatest wrestling pay-per-views of all time. Dave Meltzer stated that All Out is a candidate for the best U.S.-based PPV show in history. Although "a few" other shows were better than All Out based on "match quality", Meltzer felt that All Out truly excelled in its "atmosphere, news value, crowd, announcing match depth and creativity". On Wrestling Observer Radio, Meltzer and Bryan Alvarez agreed that the Lucha Brothers-Young Bucks match was the best cage match they had ever seen, and one of the best AEW matches ever. Meltzer rated the cage match 5.75 stars, Omega-Christian 4.25 stars, while Miro-Kingston, Moxley-Kojima, Baker-Statlander all received 4.00 stars.

Writing for Pro Wrestling Dot Net, Jason Powell wrote that All Out was all "hits" and no "misses", one of his "favorite pro wrestling pay-per-view events", with a "great atmosphere". All Out exceeded his expectations as "the company delivered some huge surprises" and "Punk truly shined in his return", with no "blatantly obvious" ring rust from his long time away from a wrestling ring. Powell added that Allin became "a bigger star for having a competitive match with Punk". The cage match's "free for all format played to the strengths of both teams" by removing traditional tag team rules. Powell praised the teams for "not going ridiculously overboard with spots off the top of the massive cage". Meanwhile, the women's battle royale was described as "the perfect choice" to follow the "outstanding" cage match, as the "entrances and eliminations kept the fans engaged", while the Soho-Rosa finish was "strong and dramatic". Lastly, the pre-show match was "a good spot-fest" that "got the live crowd going."

Brent Brookhouse of CBSSports.com stated, "What already promised to be one of the biggest domestic shows in AEW history delivered beyond any reasonable expectations" with "some of the best matches in the promotion's history" and more importantly "lasting memories" provided by the debuts of Adam Cole and Bryan Danielson. Lucha Brothers-Young Bucks was extremely "wild" and was rated A+, Moxley-Kojima featured "hard-hitting action" and was rated A−, Omega-Christian was rated B+, "very good" but the tired crowd "clearly started to burn out" at the end, while Wight-Marshall was meant to "bring the crowd back down ... and played out exactly as such, not delivering much of anything", being rated C+.

Justin Barasso of Sports Illustrated described All Out as "an outstanding pay-per-view from start to finish, with [Bryan] Danielson serving as the perfect exclamation point to close out a historic night in pro wrestling." Barasso described CM Punk's showing as "impressive", declaring that Punk and Danielson were stars who could elevate AEW "to the next level in terms of marketability, ratings, and international presence". Baker-Statlander successfully continued "Baker's ascent to stardom", which featured Statlander receiving "a tremendous beating from Baker" while having "just enough offense" herself. Omega-Christian was "hard-fought", but suspicions of "post-match surprises" surrounded the match, ultimately leading to Danielson's debut "forever changing the trajectory of AEW and all of pro wrestling."

Writing for Pro Wrestling Torch, Wade Keller stated that Adam Cole and Bryan Danielson's debuts were "wild", "worked really well back-to-back", and outshone the rest of the show. The cage match was rated 4.50 stars, "really creative, exciting, and hard-hitting throughout", and was not too long. Jericho-MJF was rated 3.00 stars, "decent to good most of the way, but the crowd really elevated the final minutes with the clever near falls and false ending". Punk-Allin was rated 3.50 stars, which "worked for the moment and for this stage of Punk's return", and "most of the match fans were into both wrestlers". Miro-Kingston was rated 2.75 stars, for "setting the tone" well without "burning out the crowd", the "mix of styles blended well" and the match "was intense and tight throughout".

Dave Meltzer stated that "many have talked about [All Out] as the best U.S.-based PPV show in history". Meanwhile, Pro Wrestling Dot Net polled viewers on how they would rate the event, with 87% giving All Out an 'A' grade, and 9% giving a 'B' grade. For the best match of the event, 68% of polled viewers chose the cage match, while 19% chose Punk-Allin.

The Lucha Brothers-Young Bucks match finished first in the 2021 Voices of Wrestling Match of the Year media poll.

== Aftermath ==
Two matches that were promoted at All Out had the results of Malakai Black defeating Dustin Rhodes on the next episode of Dynamite on September 8, while Andrade El Idolo defeated Pac on the next episode of Rampage on September 10.

In the third match promoted at All Out, Minoru Suzuki was defeated by Jon Moxley in the latter's hometown of Cincinnati on the September 8 Dynamite. Moxley and Eddie Kingston then teamed together to wrestle Suzuki and Lance Archer in the Rampage: Grand Slam episode that aired on September 24, where Kingston pinned Archer. Later on the October 15 Buy In pre-show to Rampage, Suzuki lost to Bryan Danielson. Suzuki ended his American excursion in late October 2021.

As the Elite gave speeches on the September 8 Dynamite, they were interrupted by Bryan Danielson in his first appearance on TNT. When they attacked him, he was saved by Christian Cage, Jurassic Express, and Frankie Kazarian. Adam Cole's first AEW match saw him defeating Kazarian on the September 15 Dynamite. After Danielson and Cole issued challenges, Danielson wrestled Kenny Omega to a 30-minute time limit draw in a non-title match on the September 22 Dynamite: Grand Slam, while Cole, Nick Jackson and Matt Jackson defeated Christian Cage, Jungle Boy, and Luchasaurus on the September 24 airing of Rampage: Grand Slam when Cole pinned Luchasaurus.

On the September 8 Dynamite, CM Punk gave a speech thanking Darby Allin, Sting and the fans. While Punk discussed what was next for him, he was interrupted by commentator Taz to start a feud between Punk and Taz's group, which included Powerhouse Hobbs and Hook. Punk defeated Hobbs via pinfall on the September 24 airing of Rampage: Grand Slam.

Ruby Soho made her Dynamite debut on September 8, her first appearance on TNT by defeating Jamie Hayter, an ally of Britt Baker. Soho then pinned Rebel, Baker's other ally, in a trios match on the September 10 Rampage between Soho, Kris Statlander and Riho versus Baker, Hayter and Rebel. Later in an AEW Women's Championship match on the September 22 Dynamite: Grand Slam, Baker defeated Soho via submission after Hayter interfered mid-match.

On the September 8 Dynamite, MJF claimed that the All Out match between him and Jericho was restarted due to extreme bias against him. MJF then insulted Brian Pillman Jr.'s daughter, mother, and aunt, starting a feud between the two men. MJF defeated Pillman via submission on the September 22 Dynamite: Grand Slam.

On the September 8 Dynamite, Tully Blanchard called for a match between Shawn Spears and Darby Allin, as part of Blanchard's rivalry with Sting. After Allin defeated Spears on the September 15 Dynamite, Allin and Sting brawled with Blanchard and FTR, resulting in Sting receiving a piledriver and having his facepaint wiped off. Later on the September 22 Dynamite: Grand Slam, Allin and Sting defeated FTR, with Sting submitting Harwood.

Miro next successfully defended his TNT Championship against Fuego Del Sol on the Rampage episode that aired on September 17. Miro continued attacking Del Sol post-match, leading to Sammy Guevara saving Del Sol. On the September 29 episode of Dynamite, Miro lost the TNT Championship to Guevara, partly due to Miro being sent into corner turnbuckles he exposed, and also Del Sol's interference.

As Dan Lambert was issuing an open challenge on behalf of American Top Team and Men of the Year (Ethan Page and Scorpio Sky) on the September 15 Rampage, he was interrupted by Chris Jericho and Jake Hager, starting a feud. Men of the Year defeated Jericho and Hager on the September 24 airing of Rampage: Grand Slam when Lambert interfered.

The Lucha Brothers next successfully defended their AEW World Tag Team Championships against the Butcher and the Blade on the Rampage episode that aired on September 17.

As part of the feud between the Best Friends and the Hardy Family Office, Matt Hardy directed Jack Evans to wrestle Orange Cassidy in a Hair vs. Hair match. Cassidy defeated Evans on the October 1 Rampage and the Best Friends shaved Evans' hair.

On the November 24 episode of Dynamite, video footage of All Out's Casino Battle Royale was replayed, which showed that Riho was not actually eliminated from that match; hence, Riho was awarded a non-title match against AEW Women's Champion Britt Baker, which if Riho won, would result in a future title shot. The match, billed as a Black Friday Deal match, was held later that night, airing on the November 26 episode of Rampage, where Riho defeated Baker, thus granting her the future title match. The match took place on January 8, 2022, at AEW Battle of the Belts in Charlotte, which Baker won by submission.

== Results ==
No.	Results	Stipulations	Times
1^{P}	Best Friends (Orange Cassidy, Chuck Taylor, and Wheeler Yuta) and Jurassic Express (Jungle Boy and Luchasaurus) (with Marko Stunt) defeated Hardy Family Office (Matt Hardy), Private Party (Isiah Kassidy and Marq Quen), and The Hybrid 2 (Angélico and Jack Evans) (with The Blade)	10-man tag team match	9:25
2	Miro (c) defeated Eddie Kingston	Singles match for the AEW TNT Championship	13:25
3	Jon Moxley defeated Satoshi Kojima	Singles match	12:10
4	Dr. Britt Baker, D.M.D. (c) (with Jamie Hayter and Rebel) defeated Kris Statlander (with Orange Cassidy)	Singles match for the AEW Women's World Championship	11:25
5	Lucha Brothers (Penta El Zero Miedo and Rey Fénix) (with Alex Abrahantes) defeated The Young Bucks (Matt Jackson and Nick Jackson) (c) (with Brandon Cutler)	Steel Cage match for the AEW World Tag Team Championship	22:05
6	Ruby Soho won by last eliminating Thunder Rosa	21-woman Casino Battle Royale for a AEW Women's World Championship match	21:00
7	Chris Jericho defeated MJF	Singles match Had Jericho lost, he would have retired from in-ring competition.	21:15
8	CM Punk defeated Darby Allin	Singles match	16:40
9	Paul Wight defeated Q. T. Marshall (with Aaron Solo and Nick Comoroto)	Singles match	3:10
10	Kenny Omega (c) (with Don Callis) defeated Christian Cage	Singles match for the AEW World Championship	21:20
(c) / – the champion(s) heading into the match; P / – the match was broadcast on the pre-show

=== AEW World Tag Team Championship Eliminator Tournament ===
Semifinals; Rampage: The First Dance (August 20, 2021); Dynamite (August 25, 2021)
Private Party (Isiah Kassidy and Marq Quen)	10:05
Jurassic Express (Jungle Boy and Luchasaurus)	Pin
Varsity Blonds (Brian Pillman Jr. and Griff Garrison)	8:58
Lucha Brothers (Penta El Zero Miedo and Rey Fenix)	Pin

Final; Rampage (August 27, 2021)
Jurassic Express	12:47
Lucha Brothers	Pin

=== Casino Battle Royale entrances and eliminations ===
Draw	Entrant	Order	Eliminated by	Eliminations	Reference
Clubs	Hikaru Shida	6	Nyla Rose	1	
Clubs	Skye Blue	1	Abadon	0	
Clubs	Emi Sakura	3	Hikaru Shida	0	
Clubs	The Bunny	11	Anna Jay	1	
Clubs	Abadon	2	The Bunny	1	
Diamonds	Anna Jay	12	Penelope Ford	1	
Diamonds	Kiera Hogan	4	Nyla Rose	0	
Diamonds	KiLynn King	5	Nyla Rose	0	
Diamonds	Diamante	8	Big Swole	0	
Diamonds	Nyla Rose	19	Thunder Rosa	5	
Hearts	Thunder Rosa	20	Ruby Soho	1	
Hearts	Penelope Ford	17	Tay Conti	1	
Hearts	Riho	7	Jamie Hayter	0	
Hearts	Jamie Hayter	14	Jade Cargill	1*	
Hearts	Big Swole	9	Jamie Hayter	1	
Spades	Tay Conti	18	Nyla Rose	1	
Spades	Red Velvet	15	Jade Cargill	1	
Spades	Leyla Hirsch	13	Jade Cargill	0	
Spades	Jade Cargill	16	Nyla Rose	3	
Spades	Rebel	10	Red Velvet	0	
Joker	Ruby Soho	-	Winner	1	

* although Riho was considered eliminated from the All Out battle royal by Jamie Hayter at the time of the event, video evidence was shown during the November 24, 2021 Dynamite that Riho was not properly eliminated.

== See also ==
- 2021 in professional wrestling
- List of All Elite Wrestling pay-per-view events
