= AEW The First Dance =

2021 All Elite Wrestling television special

AEW Rampage: The First Dance
- Promotional poster
- Promotion: All Elite Wrestling
- Date: August 20, 2021
- City: Chicago, Illinois
- Venue: United Center
- Attendance: 15,316

AEW Rampage special episodes chronology
← Previous; Debut episode	Next → Grand Slam

AEW Rampage: The First Dance was a professional wrestling television special produced by All Elite Wrestling (AEW). It was held on August 20, 2021, at the United Center in Chicago, Illinois, and was broadcast on TNT as a special episode of AEW's weekly television program, Rampage; the second episode of the series overall, having premiered the previous week on August 13. Three matches were contested at the event, and in the main event, Jon Moxley defeated Daniel Garcia.

With over 15,000 attendees, The First Dance was AEW's largest attended event since AEW's inception in 2019. The event saw the highly anticipated debut of CM Punk in AEW, who had been retired from professional wrestling following an acrimonious departure from WWE in January 2014. As it had been heavily speculated that Punk would be debuting at the event, tickets were sold out within minutes of going on sale.

== Production ==
=== Background ===
Rampage is All Elite Wrestling's (AEW) second weekly television program that began airing on August 13, 2021 on TNT. During Fight for the Fallen on July 28, AEW President and Chief Executive Officer Tony Khan announced that the August 20 episode of Rampage, the show's second episode, would be a special episode titled "The First Dance" and would be held at the United Center in Chicago, Illinois. It was the first televised wrestling event in the United Center since 2000. Presale tickets went online on July 30 before they were available to the general public on August 2. Tickets sold out in four minutes. The venue has a capacity of 23,000, which made it AEW's largest attended event since the company's inception in 2019.

=== Storylines ===
The First Dance featured professional wrestling matches that involved different wrestlers from pre-existing scripted feuds and storylines. Wrestlers portrayed heroes, villains, or less distinguishable characters in scripted events that built tension and culminated in a wrestling match or series of matches. Storylines were produced on AEW's weekly television programs, Dynamite and Rampage, the supplementary online streaming shows, Dark and Elevation, and The Young Bucks' YouTube series Being The Elite.

== Event ==
Other on-screen personnel
Role	Name
Commentators	Excalibur
Commentators	Jim Ross
Commentators	Taz
Commentators	Mark Henry
Ring announcer	Justin Roberts
Referees	Aubrey Edwards
Referees	Bryce Remsburg
Referees	Rick Knox
Interviewer	Mark Henry

=== Preliminary matches ===
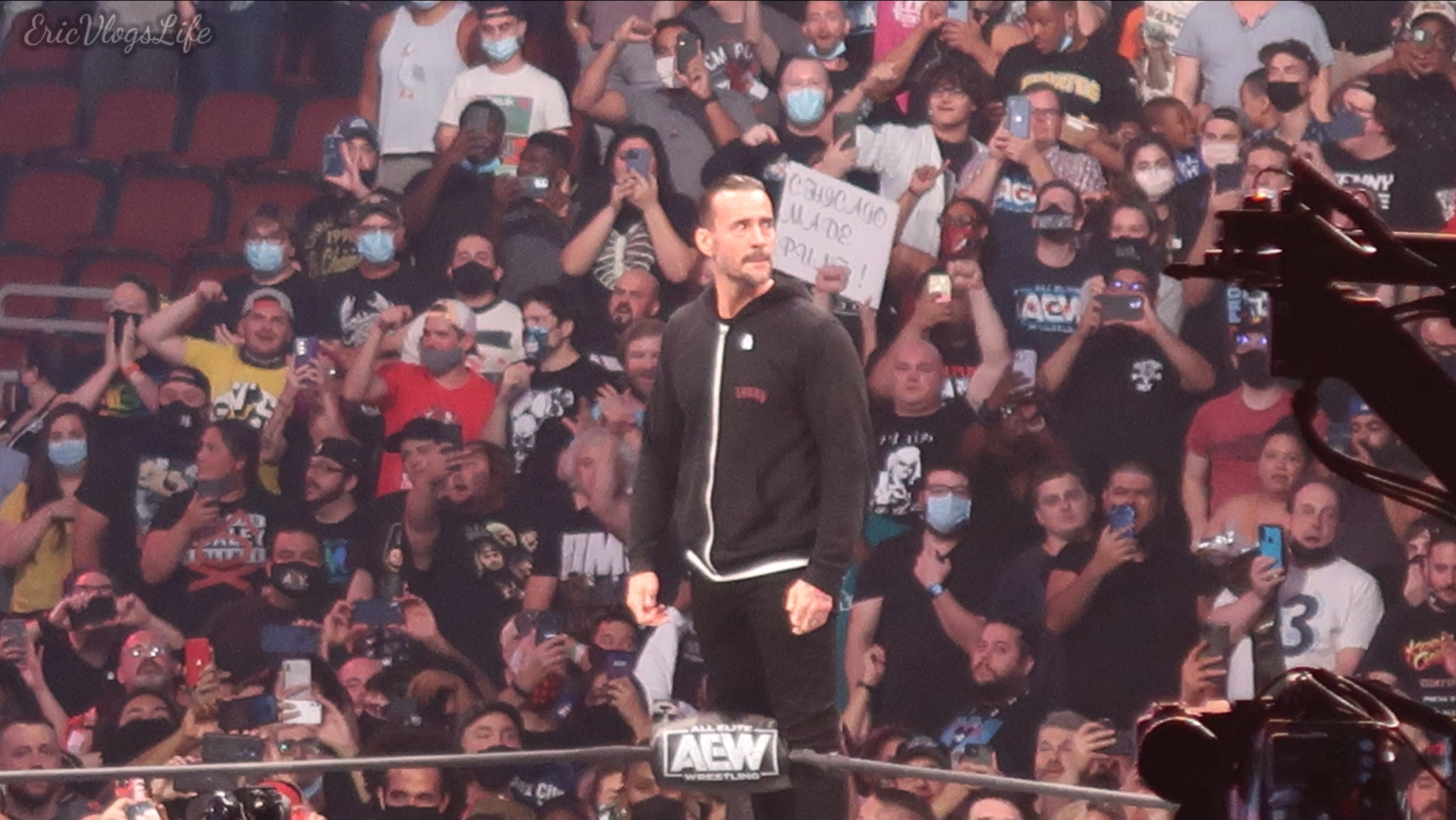
CM Punk making his entrance at Rampage: The First Dance

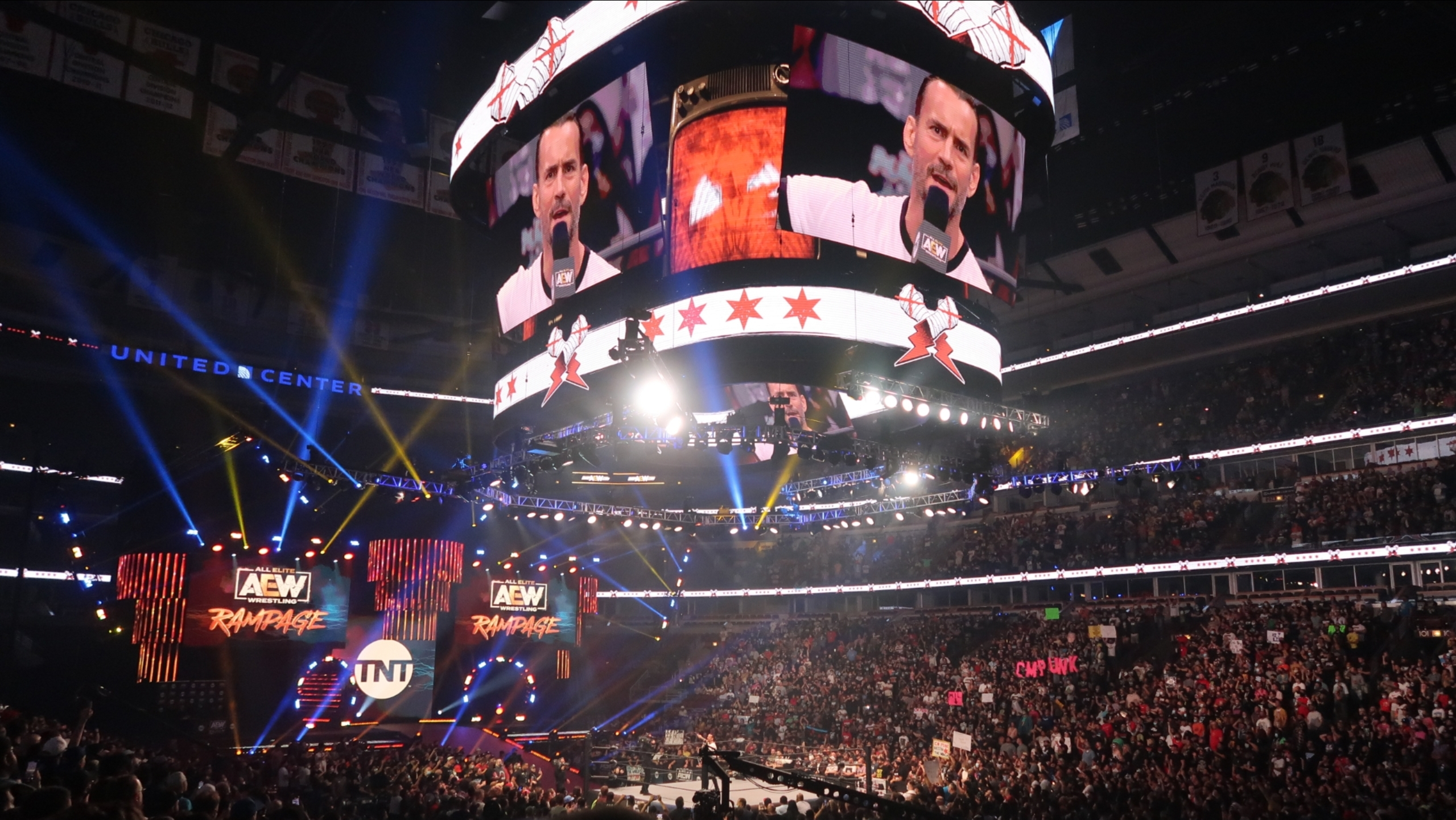
Punk speaking to the crowd

The event opened with the attendance chanting for CM Punk. "Cult of Personality", Punk's theme music, began playing and Punk made his way to the ring to a massive ovation. Punk took a microphone and spoke about his return, and challenged Darby Allin to a match at All Out, a match that had been teased by Allin a month beforehand at Fight for the Fallen when The First Dance was originally announced.

In the first match on the card, Jurassic Express (Jungle Boy and Luchasaurus) faced Private Party (Isiah Kassidy and Marq Quen) in an AEW World Tag Team Championship Eliminator tournament semi-finals match. Jungle Boy pinned Quen after performing his tag team finisher with Luchasaurus to win the match and advance in the tournament.

Following this, Jade Cargill faced Kiera Hogan. Cargill performed "Jaded" on Hogan to quickly win the match.

=== Main event ===
In the main event, Jon Moxley (accompanied by Eddie Kingston) faced Daniel Garcia (accompanied by 2.0 (Jeff Parker and Matt Lee)). Moxley defeated Garcia after forcing him to submit to the "Bulldog Choke". After the match, Moxley was attacked by 2.0 and Garcia, but Kingston, Darby Allin, and Sting came to his aid and helped clear the ring of the three as the show went off the air. As the show went off-air, Darby Allin officially accepted CM Punk’s challenge for All Out.

== Reception ==
The First Dance received universally positive reviews, with the debut of CM Punk being singled out by many critics as one of the most important and significant moments in AEW's history. Patrick Moynahan of Pro Wrestling Torch described the show as "amazing" and stated that after only two weeks of being on air, Rampage had already become "must-watch TV." Josh Nason of the Wrestling Observer Newsletter called CM Punk's debut "one of the most emotional moments in pro wrestling history". Sports journalist Dave Meltzer wrote that the debut of Punk "drew one of the most amazing audience reactions to a pro wrestler in U.S. history." Former wrestling manager Jim Cornette praised the debut as "perfect". In just under a day, Punk's new t-shirt design would break sales records for website Pro Wrestling Tees, and the amount of internet traffic caused the website to briefly crash. Tony Khan stated that over 100,000 CM Punk shirts had been sold by mid-September.

The clip of CM Punk's debut peaked at #1 on YouTube's trending feed, while the clip of his promo peaked at #2.

=== Television ratings ===
The First Dance averaged 1,129,000 television viewers on TNT, with a 0.53 rating in the 18–49 demo rating.

== Results ==
No.	Results	Stipulations	Times
1	Jurassic Express (Jungle Boy and Luchasaurus) (with Marko Stunt) defeated Private Party (Isiah Kassidy and Marq Quen) (with Matt Hardy)	Tag team match AEW World Tag Team Championship Eliminator Tournament Semifinal	10:05
2	Jade Cargill (with Mark Sterling) defeated Kiera Hogan	Singles match	1:01
3	Jon Moxley (with Eddie Kingston) defeated Daniel Garcia (with Jeff Parker and Matt Lee) by submission	Singles match	4:04

== See also ==
- 2021 in professional wrestling
- Survivor Series: WarGames (2023)
