= DIY (professional wrestling) =

Professional wrestling tag team

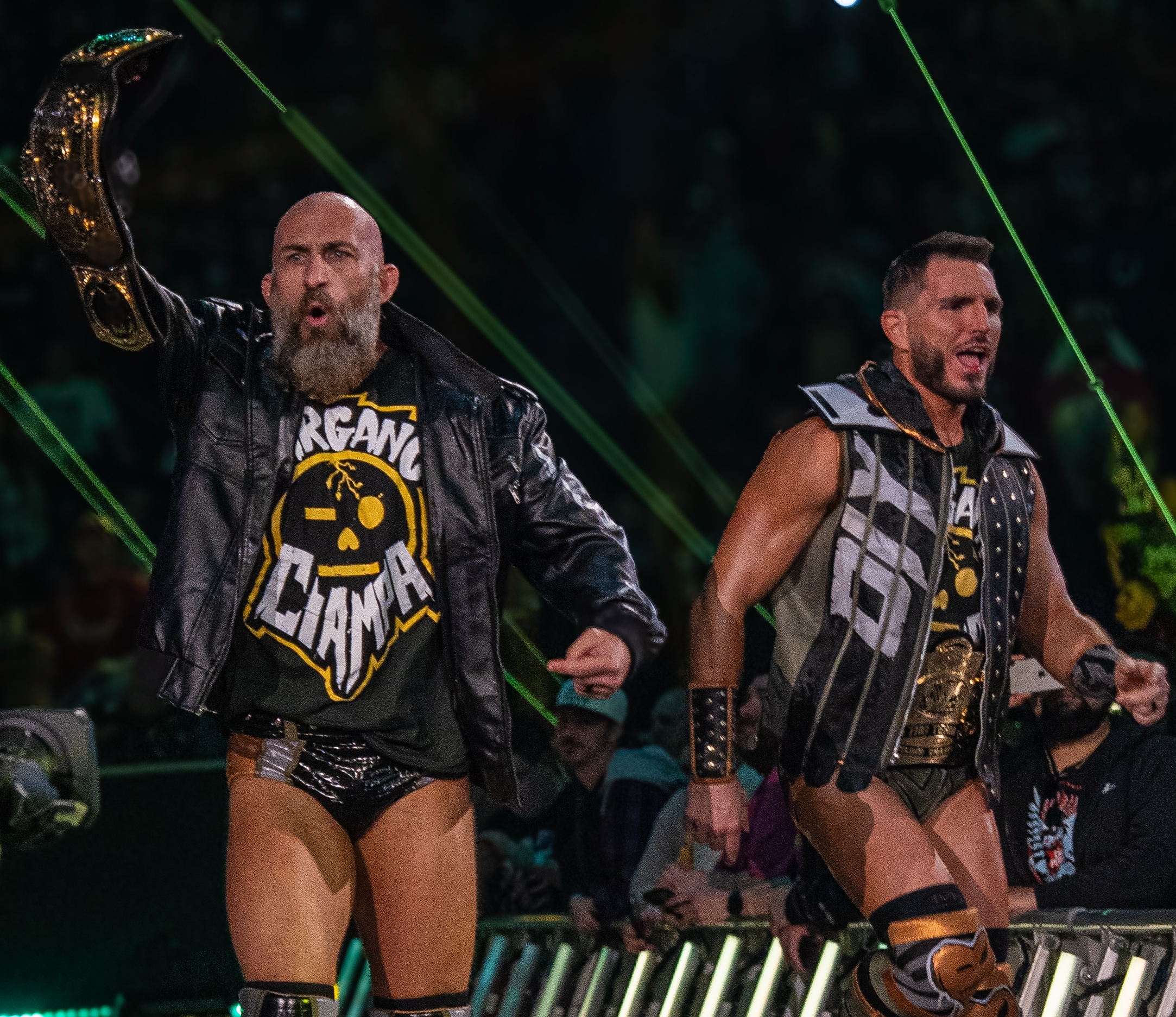
- Tommaso Ciampa (left) and Johnny Gargano (right) in February 2025

Tag team
- Members: Johnny Gargano; Tommaso Ciampa
- Name(s): #DIY; Johnny Gargano and Tommaso Ciampa
- Billed heights: 5 ft 10 in (1.78 m) – Gargano; 5 ft 11 in (1.80 m) – Ciampa
- Combined billed weight: 400 lb (180 kg)
- Debut: August 13, 2015
- Disbanded: January 21, 2026
- Years active: 2015–2017; 2023–2026

DIY (stylized as #DIY) was an American professional wrestling tag team composed of Johnny Gargano and Tommaso Ciampa. They are best known for their time in WWE, where they were former two-time WWE Tag Team Champions and one-time NXT Tag Team Champions.

Created on August 13, 2015, the team went on to win the NXT Tag Team Championship before breaking up at NXT TakeOver: Chicago on May 20, 2017, when Ciampa turned on Gargano. The two would then go on to have a lengthy and acclaimed feud over 2017 and 2018, including facing each other for the NXT Championship.

== History ==
=== WWE (2015–2021) ===
==== Formation and success (2015–2017) ====
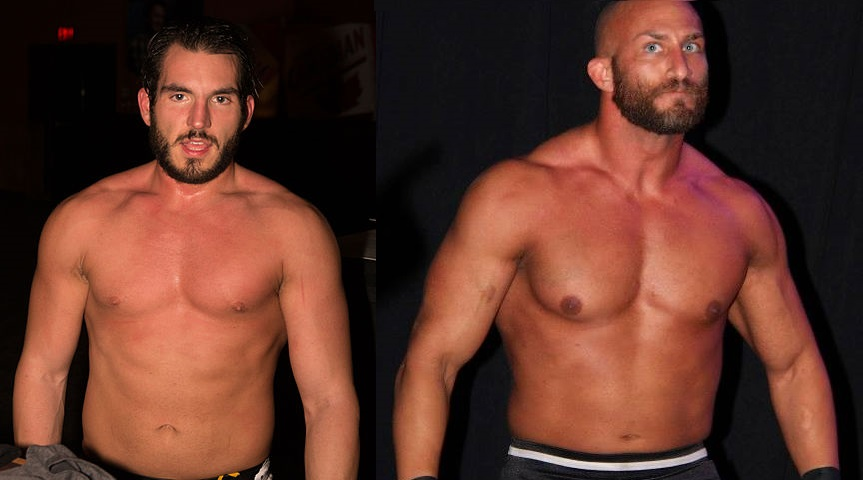
DIY in 2016

On September 2, 2015, Johnny Gargano and Tommaso Ciampa were announced as part of the Dusty Rhodes Tag Team Classic tournament. On September 9, they successfully advanced in the first round of the tournament, defeating the also newly formed duo of Tyler Breeze and Bull Dempsey. On the September 16 episode of NXT, Ciampa and Gargano lost to Baron Corbin and Rhyno, thus eliminating them from the tournament. On the October 28 edition of NXT, Gargano and Ciampa were defeated by American Alpha (Jason Jordan and Chad Gable).

On April 2, 2016, it was confirmed that Gargano and Ciampa had signed with WWE earlier in the week. Their NXT contracts were so-called "Tier 2" contracts, which allowed them to continue working independent dates alongside their now regular NXT bookings. On the April 13 episode of NXT, Ciampa and Gargano defeated The Vaudevillains. On the May 25 edition of NXT, Ciampa and Gargano defeated TM-61 (Nick Miller and Shane Thorne). On June 1, Gargano and Ciampa defeated The Revival (Dash Wilder and Scott Dawson) after calling them out earlier that night. After the match, Dawson and Wilder attacked them and attempted to injure Ciampa's knee, but they were saved by American Alpha. On July 21, it was reported that Gargano was signing a new full-time NXT deal, which would prevent him from taking further independent bookings. Two days later, it was announced that Ciampa was also entering a new exclusive NXT contract, with his final independent booking set for September.

On June 23, Gargano and Ciampa entered the Cruiserweight Classic tournament, which saw Gargano defeat Ciampa in a first round match. On July 14, Gargano was eliminated from the tournament by the eventual winner T. J. Perkins. On August 20 at NXT TakeOver: Brooklyn II, Ciampa and Gargano unsuccessfully challenged The Revival for the NXT Tag Team Championship. On the November 9 episode of NXT, Ciampa and Gargano, now collectively billed as "#DIY", were defeated by The Authors of Pain (Akam and Rezar) in the semi-finals of the 2016 Dusty Rhodes Classic, due to interference from The Revival. Ciampa and Gargano received another title shot against The Revival in a universally acclaimed two out of three falls match on November 19 at NXT TakeOver: Toronto, where they went on to become the new NXT Tag Team Champions.

DIY went on to successfully defend the NXT Tag Team Championship against the teams of Tajiri and Akira Tozawa, and TM-61 (Nick Miller and Shane Thorne) in their respective home countries of Japan and Australia. On the January 11, 2017 episode of NXT, DIY defeated The Revival in a rubber match to retain the NXT Tag Team Championships and end their trilogy feud, but were assaulted by The Authors of Pain afterwards. At NXT TakeOver: San Antonio, they lost the NXT Tag Team Championship to The Authors of Pain. They would receive their rematch on the March 1 episode of NXT, which ended in a no contest after The Revival interfered and attacked both teams. On April 1 at NXT TakeOver: Orlando, all three teams competed in a triple threat elimination match for the NXT Tag Team Championship, but DIY failed to regain the titles after being the first team eliminated.

On the May 10 episode of NXT, NXT General Manager William Regal announced that DIY would face The Authors of Pain in the first-ever ladder match for the NXT Tag Team Championship at NXT TakeOver: Chicago, which they lost. Following the match, Ciampa turned on Gargano and attacked him, thus turning Ciampa heel and disbanding the team.

==== Break-up and feud (2017–2018) ====
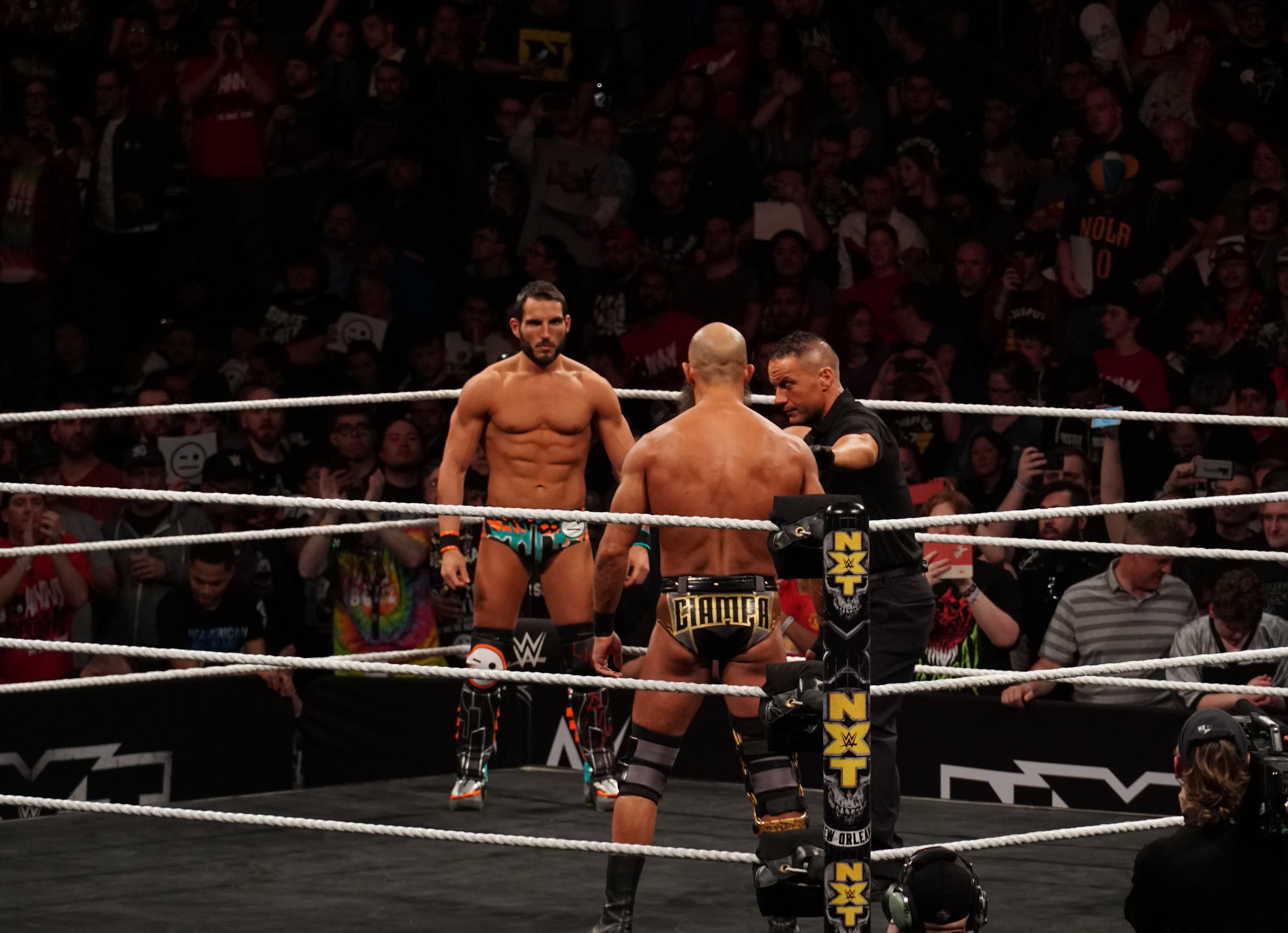
Gargano facing Ciampa at NXT TakeOver: New Orleans in April 2018

It was later revealed that Ciampa had suffered a ruptured ACL in his right knee and would await surgery. In a further update, it was reported that his surgery was successful and the timetable for his return was estimated for early-to-mid 2018.

At NXT TakeOver: Philadelphia, Gargano failed to capture the NXT Championship from Andrade "Cien" Almas. After the match, Ciampa returned to attack Gargano from behind with a crutch. On the February 21 episode of NXT, Gargano challenged Almas to a rematch for the NXT Championship, which he lost due to interference from Ciampa, forcing Gargano to leave NXT as per the pre-match stipulation. The two then fought in the main event of NXT TakeOver: New Orleans in an unsanctioned match which Gargano won, resulting in Gargano being reinstated in NXT. On the April 25 episode of NXT, Gargano was attacked by Ciampa during his entrance for his NXT Championship match against Aleister Black. Two weeks later on NXT, Gargano called out Ciampa, leading to a brawl in which Gargano's wife Candice LeRae was knocked unconscious. The two then fought at NXT TakeOver: Chicago II in a Chicago Street Fight, which Ciampa won. Gargano's character then began a darker turn, becoming more unstable, showing a more aggressive style, and using a spike DDT to defeat EC3 on the July 4 episode of NXT, similar to the one Ciampa pinned him with at TakeOver: Chicago II. At the July 18 NXT tapings of the July 25 episode, Gargano interfered in Ciampa's NXT Championship match against Aleister Black and accidentally hit Black with the title belt, causing Ciampa to win the championship. The following week, as Black attempted to confront Ciampa, Gargano ran past him and attacked Ciampa, but was then attacked by Black. The following week, Gargano and Black were both attacked by Ciampa during their scheduled match. The three men were then scheduled to compete in a triple threat match for the NXT Championship at NXT TakeOver: Brooklyn IV, but Black was removed from the match after being found unconscious in the parking lot after the show, rendering him unable to compete. The title match was then changed to a Last Man Standing match between Gargano and Ciampa, which Gargano lost. On the October 24 episode of NXT, Gargano was revealed as the one who attacked Black prior to their original TakeOver: Brooklyn 4 title match, thus turning heel. The two faced off at NXT TakeOver: WarGames, where Black defeated Gargano while Ciampa retained the NXT Championship against Velveteen Dream.

==== Sporadic reunions (2019–2021) ====
On the December 19, 2018 episode of NXT, Black and Gargano competed in a steel cage match, which Gargano won after Ciampa interfered and they both performed their former tag team finisher Meeting in the Middle on Black, hinting a potential reunion. On January 26, 2019, at NXT TakeOver: Phoenix, Gargano defeated Ricochet to become the new NXT North American Champion while Ciampa retained the NXT Championship against Black in the main event. After Ciampa won, he was joined by Gargano and posed together with their respective titles.

This would mark the reformation of their team (although they would not immediately re-use the DIY monicker) and the two had their first match as a team since 2017 on February 3, 2019, at Halftime Heat, teaming with Adam Cole in a losing effort against Black, Ricochet and Velveteen Dream. On the January 30 episode of NXT (aired on February 20), Gargano lost the NXT North American Championship to Velveteen Dream. On the February 18 episode of Raw, Ciampa and Gargano made their main roster debut and defeated former rivals and Raw Tag Team Champions The Revival in a non-title match. They made their SmackDown debut the following night, defeating The Bar (Cesaro and Sheamus).

DIY took part in the 2019 Dusty Rhodes Tag Team Classic on February 20, defeating The Undisputed Era (Kyle O'Reilly and Bobby Fish) in the first round (aired March 6) and losing to Aleister Black and Ricochet in the second (aired March 13). After their loss, the duo disbanded again when Ciampa attempted to attack Gargano in a way echoing his original betrayal at TakeOver: Chicago in 2017, only for Gargano to reverse the attack and superkick Ciampa.

With DIY broken-up again, the two were scheduled to face each other at NXT TakeOver: New York for the NXT Championship, but Ciampa was sidelined due to undergoing an anterior cervical fusion surgery, which forced him to relinquish his title and was planned to render him inactive a reported minimum of six month, thus prematurely ending the angle. With Ciampa sidelined, Gargano would go on with a feud with Adam Cole from April to August over the NXT Championship. After Cole earned Ciampa's vacant spot in the title match at TakeOver: New York, Gargano defeated him in a two-out-of-three falls match to become the new champion. He would later lose it to Cole at NXT TakeOver: XXV and fail to regain it at NXT TakeOver: Toronto, in a three stages of hell match.

Ciampa returned on the October 2 episode of NXT to face Cole, starting a feud with his stable, The Undisputed Era. On the October 23 episode of NXT, Gargano and Ciampa reunited yet again to face The Undisputed Era together; they were joined by surprise NXT returnee Finn Bálor, only for Bálor to attack Gargano and let The Undisputed Era assault Ciampa. Gargano suffered a legitimate neck injury when Bálor performed his signature move 1916 on him on the entrance ramp, sidelining him indefinitely and ending the two's reunion prematurely.

Gargano returned on the December 18 episode of NXT, costing Bálor his NXT Championship match against Cole. Although he didn't interact with Ciampa at first, leaving the future of DIY uncertain, he eventually came to Ciampa's rescue against The Undisputed Era on the January 15, 2020 episode of NXT, signaling that they were still active as a team. Later during the show, DIY discussed the possibility of facing NXT UK's Moustache Mountain, who had tweeted about them during the show, with them agreeing to team up "one more time for old time's sake"; a match between the two teams was later made official for Worlds Collide, where DIY was successful.

On February 16 at NXT TakeOver: Portland, Gargano lost to Finn Balor; in the main event, he came out during Ciampa's match against Adam Cole for the NXT Championship, seemingly to help Ciampa after Cole's Undisputed Era teammates interfered in the match. However, he instead hit Ciampa with the title belt, costing him the match and turning heel again; this marked the beginning of another feud between the two, and therefore another disbandment of DIY. On the April 8 episode of NXT, Gargano would defeat Ciampa in an Empty Arena No Holds Barred match, with assistance from LeRae, ending their three-year-long feud once and for all.

Ciampa and Gargano reunited on the November 23, 2021 edition of NXT as part of Team Black & Gold alongside Pete Dunne and LA Knight to fight Team 2.0, consisting of Bron Breakker, Grayson Waller, Tony D'Angelo, and Carmelo Hayes, in that year's Men's WarGames match. They would go on to lose the match, this seemingly being Gargano's final match in WWE, after which he decided not to renew his contract with the company after it expired on December 10.

=== Independent circuit (2015–2016) ===
Between the creation of DIY and mid-2016, both Gargano and Ciampa were under a part-time contract with WWE, and continued to appear on independent promotions. When DIY was created in August 2015, Gargano was also part of the Canadian promotion Smash Wrestling, in which he was the Smash Wrestling Champion since April 26. He continued to hold and defend the title in parallel of his WWE activities (including against his wife Candice LeRae on August 23, 2015), before losing it to Mark Haskins at PROGRESS Chapter 32: 5000 To 1 on June 26, 2016.

Gargano and Ciampa also wrestled in Pro Wrestling Guerrilla (PWG) since 2013; on December 11, 2015, they unsuccessfully challenged The Young Bucks (Matt and Nick Jackson) for their PWG World Tag Team Championship on the first night of All-Star Weekend XI. On the second night, they lost to Unbreakable F'n Machines (Brian Cage and Michael Elgin). They also wrestled together at the Ohio-based promotion Absolute Intense Wrestling, taking part of a ten-man tag team match in a successful effort at the Keep the Change, You Filthy Animal event.

Both Gargano and Ciampa had also been a part of the Dreamwave promotion since 2014. On January 2, 2016, at the Season Premiere event, they unsuccessfully challenged Dreamwave Tag Team Champions Christian Rose and Matt Cage for their titles. At the Beyond Wrestling event Beyond The Dream Left Behind on January 31, they defeated Dan Maff and Monsta Mack.

On February 19, 2016, at the AAW Wrestling event Art of War, they were defeated by Chris Hero and Drew Gulak.

=== Return to WWE (2023–2026) ===
==== Reunion on Raw (2023–2024) ====
Gargano returned to WWE on the August 22, 2022 edition of Raw; Ciampa, who was aligned with The Miz at the time, would suffer a hip injury shortly after until the following summer, during which Gargano competed on his own or with Dexter Lumis before a shoulder injury would also sideline him for several months.

On the October 2, 2023 episode of Raw, Ciampa failed to win the Intercontinental Championship from Gunther. After the match, Ciampa was attacked by Gunther's Imperium stablemates, Ludwig Kaiser and Giovanni Vinci. However, Gargano would then make his return to WWE after several months away to rescue Ciampa, officially reuniting DIY in the process, and subsequently feuding with Imperium. They would go on to trade victories during the course of the feud. On the January 29, 2024 episode of Raw, DIY received a match for the Undisputed WWE Tag Team Championship against The Judgment Day's Damian Priest and Finn Bálor, but were defeated. On the March 18 episode of Raw, DIY defeated the Creed Brothers to qualify for the Six Pack Ladder Match for the Undisputed WWE Tag Team Championship at WrestleMania XL but failed to capture any of the titles. On the April 15 episode of Raw, DIY defeated the Creed Brothers and The New Day (Kofi Kingston and Xavier Woods) to earn a match against Awesome Truth (The Miz and R-Truth) for the renamed World Tag Team Championship the following week, but failed to win the titles.

==== Move to SmackDown (2024–2026) ====
As part of the 2024 WWE Draft, DIY were drafted to the SmackDown brand. On the July 5 episode of SmackDown, DIY defeated A-Town Down Under (Austin Theory and Grayson Waller) to win the WWE Tag Team Championship, marking their first championship win on the main roster. The following week on the July 12 episode of SmackDown, DIY successfully defended their titles in a rematch against A-Town Down Under, after which they were attacked by Jacob Fatu of The Bloodline. On the August 2 episode of SmackDown, DIY lost the titles to The Bloodline (Fatu and Tama Tonga) after interference from Solo Sikoa and Tonga Loa, ending their reign at 28 days.

On the December 6 episode of SmackDown, DIY defeated the Motor City Machine Guns (Chris Sabin and Alex Shelley) to win the titles for the second time after Gargano hit Sabin with a low blow, turning both men heel for the first time as a team.

At the Royal Rumble on February 1, #DIY defeated the Motor City Machine Guns in a two out of three falls match to retain their titles after interference from the returning Street Profits, who also attacked #DIY after the match. On the March 14 episode of SmackDown, #DIY lost the titles to the Street Profits, ending their second reign at 98 days. On the April 25 episode of SmackDown, they would attempt to regain the titles against the Street Profits in a critically acclaimed tables, ladders, and chairs match also involving the Motor City Machine Guns, where the Street Profits retained. On the May 23 episode of SmackDown, Ciampa defeated Chris Sabin with assistance from Candice LeRae. On the December 19 episode of SmackDown, DIY were defeated by Carmelo Hayes and Ilja Dragunov in what would be DIY's final match as a team in WWE.

On January 21, 2026, Ciampa announced he would not be renewing his contract when it expires, thus ending his 10-year tenure with WWE and disbanding DIY.

== Championships and accomplishments ==
- NXT Tag Team Championship (1 time)
- WWE Tag Team Championship (2 times)
- NXT Year-End Award (1 times)
  - Match of the Year (2016) vs. The Revival (Scott Dawson and Dash Wilder) (c) in a two-out-of-three falls match for the NXT Tag Team Championship at NXT TakeOver: Toronto
