= NXT TakeOver: Chicago =

2017 WWE Network event

- Promotional poster featuring Ruby Riot, Asuka, Nikki Cross, Bobby Roode, and Hideo Itami
- Promotion: WWE
- Brand: NXT
- Date: May 20, 2017
- City: Rosemont, Illinois
- Venue: Allstate Arena

WWE event chronology
← Previous; United Kingdom Championship Special	Next → Backlash

NXT TakeOver chronology
← Previous; Orlando	Next → Brooklyn III

NXT TakeOver: Chicago chronology
← Previous; First	Next → II

NXT TakeOver: Chicago was a 2017 professional wrestling livestreaming event produced by WWE, held exclusively for wrestlers from the promotion's developmental brand, NXT. It was the 15th NXT TakeOver event and the inaugural TakeOver: Chicago. It took place on May 20, 2017, at the Allstate Arena in the Chicago suburb of Rosemont, Illinois as part of that year's Backlash weekend and aired exclusively on the WWE Network.

Five matches were contested at the event. In the main event, The Authors of Pain (Akam and Rezar) defeated #DIY (Johnny Gargano and Tommaso Ciampa) in a Ladder match to retain the NXT Tag Team Championship. In other prominent matches, Pete Dunne defeated Tyler Bate to win the WWE United Kingdom Championship, Asuka defeated Nikki Cross and Ruby Riot in a triple threat match to retain the NXT Women's Championship, and Bobby Roode defeated Hideo Itami to retain the NXT Championship in the penultimate match.

== Production ==
=== Background ===
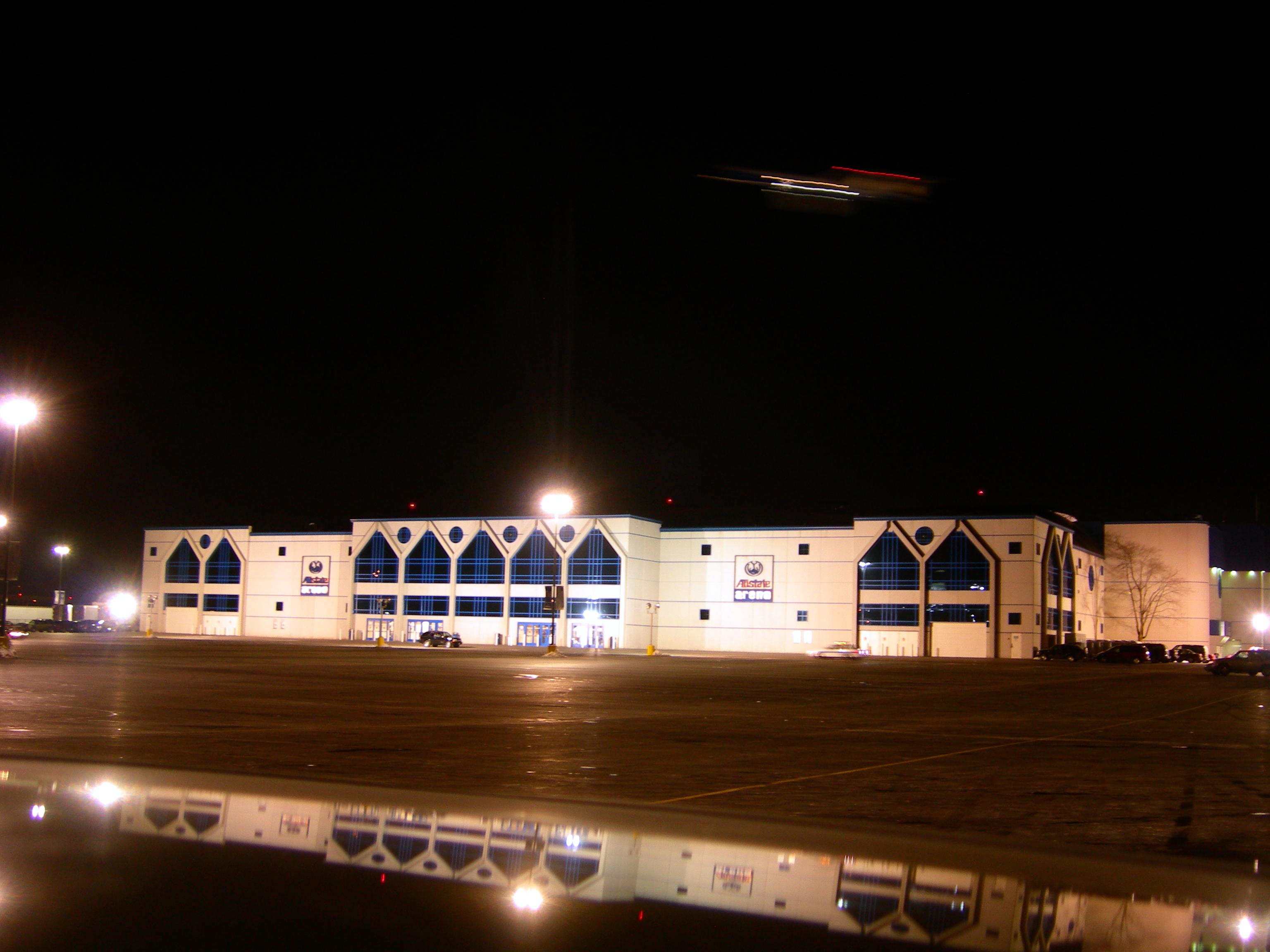
The 15th NXT TakeOver event was held at the Allstate Arena in the Chicago suburb of Rosemont, Illinois.

TakeOver was a series of professional wrestling events that began in May 2014, as WWE's developmental brand, NXT, held its second WWE Network-exclusive livestreaming event, billed as TakeOver. The "TakeOver" moniker subsequently became the branding for all of NXT's major events held periodically throughout the year. Announced on April 3, 2017, TakeOver: Chicago was scheduled as the 15th TakeOver event and was held on Saturday, May 20, 2017, as a support show for that year's Backlash for the main roster. It took place at the same venue as Backlash in the Allstate Arena in Rosemont, Illinois, a suburb of Chicago from which the event took its name. Tickets went on sale April 8 through Ticketmaster.

=== Storylines ===
The card included matches that resulted from scripted storylines. Results were predetermined by WWE's writers on the NXT brand, while storylines were produced on their weekly television program, NXT.

At TakeOver: Orlando, Bobby Roode retained the NXT Championship over Shinsuke Nakamura. On the April 19 episode of NXT, Roode came out and insulted Nakamura. Hideo Itami interrupted Roode's speech, slapped him and attacked him with a GTS. The following week, general manager William Regal made a title match between the two official for TakeOver: Chicago.

Asuka successfully defended the NXT Women's Championship against Ember Moon at TakeOver: Orlando, but during the match, Asuka shoved the referee onto Moon to avoid Moon's finisher, the Eclipse, continuing Asuka's transition into a villainess that began at TakeOver: Toronto. On the May 3 NXT, Moon, Ruby Riot, and Nikki Cross were the final three combatants remaining in a #1 Contender's Battle Royal. During the match, Asuka attacked all three women, resulting in a no contest and cementing Asuka's heel turn. After the match, William Regal announced that Asuka would defend the NXT Women's Championship against Moon, Riot, and Cross in a fatal four-way match at TakeOver: Chicago. However, Moon suffered a legitimate shoulder injury after being thrown out of the ring awkwardly during Asuka's attack. Therefore, Moon was pulled out of the match, making the match a triple threat.

On May 6, at a United Kingdom Championship Tournament live event, Tyler Bate defeated Joseph Conners to retain the WWE United Kingdom Championship. Following the match, it was announced that on May 7 at the United Kingdom Championship Special, Bate would defend his title against Mark Andrews, who had become the number one contender after defeating James Drake. Bate would go on and win the match. Also on May 7, Pete Dunne defeated Trent Seven to become the new number one contender for the United Kingdom Championship at TakeOver: Chicago.

== Event ==
Other on-screen personnel
Role:	Name:
Commentators	Tom Phillips
Commentators	Nigel McGuinness
Commentators	Percy Watson
Commentators	Jim Ross (UK Championship match)
Ring announcer	Mike Rome
Referees	Darryl Sharma
Referees	Drake Wuertz
Referees	Eddie Orengo
Pre-show panel	Charly Caruso
Pre-show panel	Peter Rosenberg
Pre-show panel	Nigel McGuinness

=== Preliminary matches ===
In the opening match, Eric Young faced Roderick Strong. Strong performed "End of Heartache" on Young to win the match.

Next, Tyler Bate defended the WWE United Kingdom Championship against Pete Dunne. In the climax, Dunne performed the "Bitter End" on Bate to win the title. The match was rated 4.75 stars by journalist Dave Meltzer, tying for Meltzer's best-reviewed WWE match of 2017 thus far. The match was also voted as the NXT Match of the Year.

Afterwards, Asuka defended the NXT Women's Championship against Ruby Riott and Nikki Cross in a triple threat match. The ending saw Asuka perform a running knee smash on Riot and pin both women to retain the title.

In the penultimate match, Bobby Roode defended the NXT Championship against Hideo Itami. Roode performed a "Glorious DDT" on Itami for a near-fall. Itami performed a "GTS" on Roode, who rolled out of the ring, and scored a near-fall. Itami attempted a second "GTS" on Roode, who countered and performed two consecutive "Glorious DDTs" on Itami to retain the title.

=== Main event ===
In the main event, The Authors of Pain (Akam and Rezar) defended the NXT Tag Team Championship against #DIY (Johnny Gargano and Tommaso Ciampa) in a ladder match. Gargano performed a splash off a ladder onto Akam, who was lay on a ladder bridged between the ring apron and the barricade, whilst Ciampa performed a splash off the ladder through a ladder, which was also bridged, on Rezar. After Paul Ellering interfered, Gargano performed a superkick on Ellering. Ciampa performed a German suplex through a ladder, which was positioned in the corner, on Rezar. Gargano and Ciampa performed "Meeting in the Middle" into a ladder, which Akam was trapped in. Gargano and Ciampa attempted to retrieve the title belts but Akam and Rezar performed powerbombs on Gargano and Ciampa. Akam and Rezar then performed the "Super Collider" on Gargano and Ciampa. Akam and Rezar retrieved the title belts to retain the titles.

After the match, Ciampa attacked Gargano and performed two running knee smashes on Gargano, turning heel. Ciampa performed an "Air Raid Crash" through two tables near the announce table on Gargano. Medical personnel checked on Gargano as the event ended.

== Aftermath ==
Tommaso Ciampa addressed his attack on Johnny Gargano on the May 31 episode of NXT, stating that he accused him of trying to replace him after he was injured two days before TakeOver: Chicago. Ciampa then blamed the fans and Gargano for the downfall of #DIY. He stated that if he was going to be out for a long time due to an injury, Gargano needed to do the same. Ciampa then promised to come back and be the biggest son of a bitch when he did so, and stated that he was professional wrestling.

This event would be the first of two TakeOver: Chicago events, a subseries of TakeOvers that were held at the Allstate Arena in the Chicago suburb of Rosemont, Illinois. TakeOver: WarGames in 2019 would also be held at the Allstate Arena, but it was the first for the WarGames events.

== Results ==
No.	Results	Stipulations	Times
1^{N}	Aleister Black defeated Curt Hawkins by pinfall	Singles match	2:51
2^{N}	Velveteen Dream defeated Robert Anthony by pinfall	Singles match	2:25
3^{N}	Drew McIntyre defeated Wesley Blake by pinfall	Singles match	8:50
4	Roderick Strong defeated Eric Young (with Alexander Wolfe and Killian Dain) by pinfall	Singles match	13:42
5	Pete Dunne defeated Tyler Bate (c) by pinfall	Singles match for the WWE United Kingdom Championship	15:27
6	Asuka (c) defeated Nikki Cross and Ruby Riot by pinfall	Triple threat match for the NXT Women's Championship	12:30
7	Bobby Roode (c) defeated Hideo Itami by pinfall	Singles match for the NXT Championship	17:50
8	The Authors of Pain (Akam and Rezar) (c) (with Paul Ellering) defeated #DIY (Johnny Gargano and Tommaso Ciampa)	Ladder match for the NXT Tag Team Championship	20:06
(c) / – the champion(s) heading into the match; N / – the match was taped for a future broadcast of NXT
