= NXT TakeOver: Orlando =

2017 WWE Network event

- Promotional poster featuring Asuka, Ember Moon, Bobby Roode, and Shinsuke Nakamura
- Promotion: WWE
- Brand: NXT
- Date: April 1, 2017
- City: Orlando, Florida
- Venue: Amway Center
- Attendance: 14,975

WWE event chronology
← Previous; Fastlane	Next → WrestleMania 33

NXT TakeOver chronology
← Previous; San Antonio	Next → Chicago

NXT TakeOver: Orlando was a 2017 professional wrestling livestreaming event produced by WWE, held exclusively for wrestlers from the promotion's developmental brand, NXT. It was the 14th NXT TakeOver event and took place on April 1, 2017, at the Amway Center in Orlando, Florida. It was held as part of the WrestleMania 33 weekend festivities and aired exclusively on the WWE Network.

Five matches were contested at the event. In the main event, Bobby Roode defeated Shinsuke Nakamura to retain the NXT Championship. In other prominent matches, Asuka retained the NXT Women's Championship against Ember Moon and Authors of Pain (Akam and Rezar) retained the NXT Tag Team Championship against #DIY (Johnny Gargano and Tommaso Ciampa) and The Revival (Scott Dawson and Dash Wilder). All of the championships were given new belt designs. This was also the final NXT event for Shinsuke Nakamura, Tye Dillinger, and The Revival (Scott Dawson and Dash Wilder), who were called up to the main roster. This event was also notable for the debut of Aleister Black and the return of Drew Galloway (who returned under his Drew McIntyre ring name which he used during his first tenure in WWE), who was sitting in the front row, with ESPN confirming that Galloway had re-signed with WWE and would perform on NXT.

== Production ==
=== Background ===
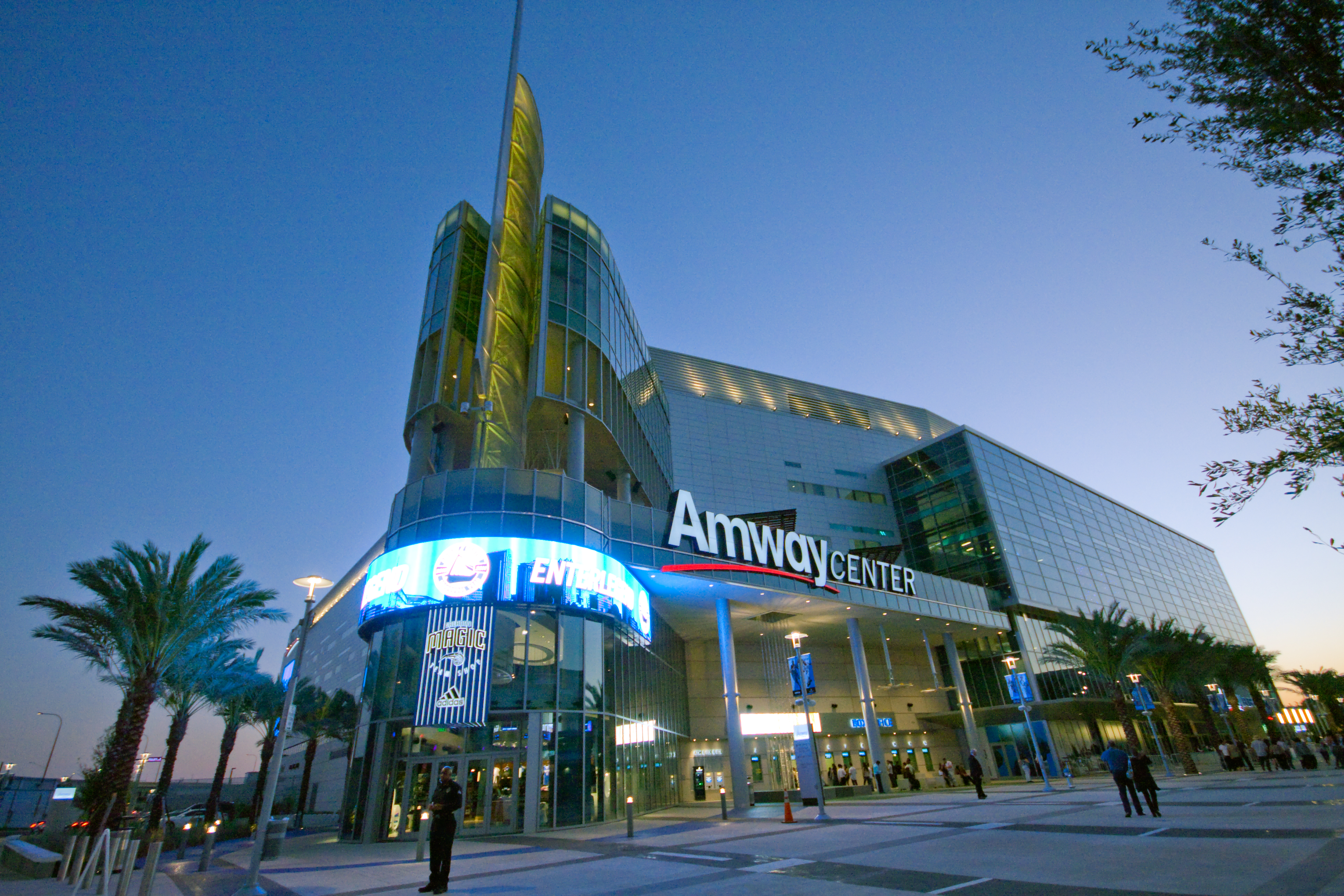
The 14th NXT TakeOver event was held at the Amway Center in Orlando, Florida.

TakeOver was a series of professional wrestling events that began in May 2014, as WWE's developmental brand, NXT, held its second WWE Network-exclusive livestreaming event, billed as TakeOver. The "TakeOver" moniker subsequently became the branding for all of NXT's major events held periodically throughout the year. Announced on December 12, 2016, TakeOver: Orlando was scheduled as the 14th TakeOver event and was held on Saturday, April 1, 2017, as a support show for WrestleMania 33 for the main roster. It was held at the Amway Center and was named after the venue's city of Orlando, Florida. Tickets went on sale on December 16, 2016, through Ticketmaster.

=== Storylines ===
The event comprised five matches that resulted from scripted storylines. Results were predetermined by WWE's writers on the NXT brand, while storylines were produced on WWE's weekly television program, NXT.

== Event ==
Other on-screen personnel
Role:	Name:
Commentators	Tom Phillips
Commentators	Nigel McGuinness
Commentators	Percy Watson
Ring announcer	Mike Rome
Referees	Darryl Sharma
Referees	Drake Wuertz
Referees	Eddie Orengo
Pre-show panel	Charly Caruso
Pre-show panel	Sam Roberts
Pre-show panel	Nigel McGuinness

=== Preliminary matches ===
The event opened with Sanity (Eric Young, Alexander Wolfe, Killian Dain, and Nikki Cross) facing Tye Dillinger, Ruby Riott, Roderick Strong, and Kassius Ohno (who was a replacement for No Way Jose) in an eight-person mixed tag team match. Dain performed an "Ulster Plantation" on Dillinger to win the match.

Next, Aleister Black faced Andrade Cien Almas. Black performed "Black Mass" on Almas for the win.

After that, The Authors of Pain (Akam and Rezar) (accompanied by Paul Ellering) defended the NXT Tag Team Championship against #DIY (Johnny Gargano and Tommaso Ciampa) and The Revival (Scott Dawson and Dash Wilder) in a triple threat elimination match. Akam and Rezar performed "The Last Chapter" on Ciampa to eliminate #DIY. Akam and Rezar performed the "Super Collider" on Wilder and Dawson to retain the titles.

In the penultimate match, Asuka defended the NXT Women's Championship against Ember Moon. In the end, Ember attempted the "Eclipse" on Asuka but Asuka pushed the referee into the ring ropes, causing Moon to fall. Asuka performed a roundhouse kick on Moon to retain the title.

=== Main event ===
In the main event, Bobby Roode defended the NXT Championship against Shinsuke Nakamura. During the match, Roode targeted Nakamura's leg. Roode performed a "Glorious DDT" on Nakamura for a near-fall. Roode then retrieved the ring bell but the referee prevented Roode from using it, allowing Nakamura to perform an inverted exploder suplex on Roode. Nakamura attempted a "Kinshasa" but Roode countered into a spinebuster on Nakamura for a near-fall. Roode performed a rotating "Glorious DDT" on Nakamura to retain the title.

== Results ==
No.	Results	Stipulations	Times
1^{N}	Peyton Royce (with Billie Kay) defeated Aliyah by pinfall	Singles match	02:53
2^{N}	Heavy Machinery (Tucker Knight and Otis Dozovic) defeated The Bollywood Boys (Gurv Sihra and Harv Sihra) by pinfall	Tag team match	03:22
3^{N}	Oney Lorcan defeated El Vagabundo	Singles match	02:50
4	Sanity (Alexander Wolfe, Eric Young, Killian Dain, and Nikki Cross) defeated Kassius Ohno^{1}, Roderick Strong, Ruby Riott, and Tye Dillinger by pinfall	Eight-person mixed tag team match	12:23
5	Aleister Black defeated Andrade "Cien" Almas by pinfall	Singles match	09:35
6	The Authors of Pain (Rezar and Akam) (c) (with Paul Ellering) defeated #DIY (Johnny Gargano and Tommaso Ciampa) and The Revival (Dash Wilder and Scott Dawson)	Triple threat elimination match for the NXT Tag Team Championship	23:50
7	Asuka (c) defeated Ember Moon by pinfall	Singles match for the NXT Women's Championship	12:10
8	Bobby Roode (c) defeated Shinsuke Nakamura by pinfall	Singles match for the NXT Championship	28:20
(c) / – the champion(s) heading into the match; N / – the match was taped for a future broadcast of NXT

^{1} Kassius Ohno replaced No Way Jose, who was unable to compete after an attack by SAnitY.

=== Tag Team elimination match ===
Elimination	Wrestler	Team	Eliminated by	Elimination move	Times
1	Tommaso Ciampa	#DIY	Akam	Pinned after The Last Chapter	18:55
2	Scott Dawson	The Revival	Akam	Pinned after a Super Collider	23:50
Winners:	The Authors of Pain (c)				23:50
