= Rezar =

Dutch professional wrestler and mixed martial artist

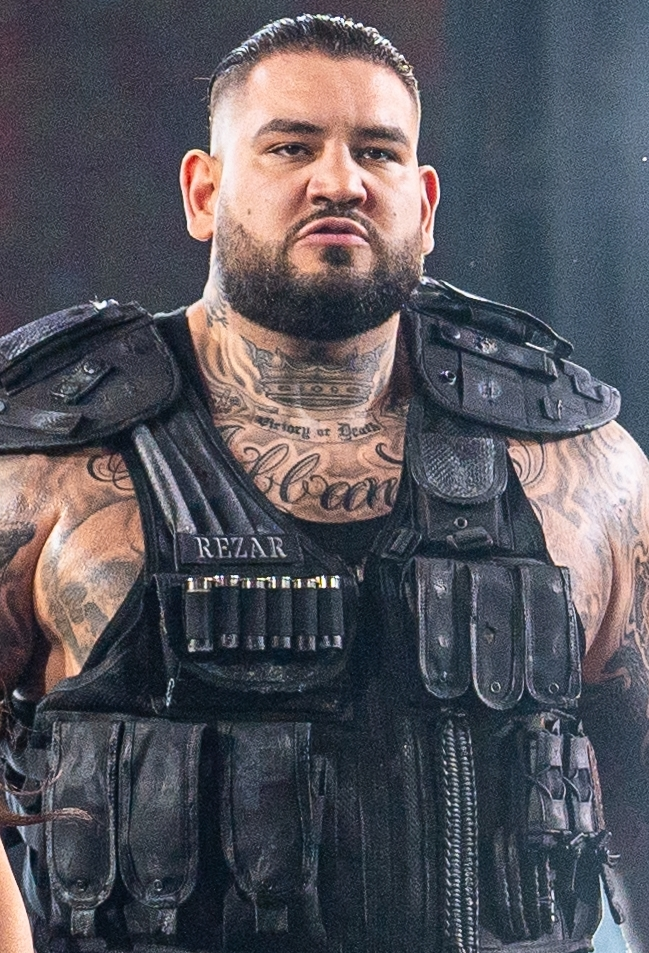
- Rezar in 2024
- Born: Gzim Selmani; 16 June 1994 (age 32); Amsterdam, Netherlands
- Professional wrestling career
- Ring name(s): Gzim Selmani; Rezar
- Billed height: 6 ft 4 in (193 cm)
- Billed weight: 330 lb (150 kg)
- Trained by: WWE Performance Center
- Debut: 30 January 2016
- Martial arts career
- Other names: The Albanian Psycho
- Nationality: Dutch
- Height: 6 ft 3 in (1.91 m)
- Weight: 265 lb (120 kg; 18 st 13 lb)
- Division: Heavyweight
- Style: Judo, kickboxing
- Team: Golden Glory
- Trainer: Martijn De Jong
- Years active: 2012–2014 (MMA)

Mixed martial arts record
- Total: 6
- Wins: 4
- By knockout: 1
- By submission: 3
- Losses: 2
- By knockout: 2

Amateur record
- Total: 2
- Wins: 2
- By knockout: 1
- By submission: 1

Other information
- Mixed martial arts record from Sherdog
- Last updated on: 9 June 2016

Gzim Selmani (born 16 June 1994) is a Dutch bare-knuckle boxer, former professional wrestler, and former mixed martial artist. He is best known for his time in WWE, where he performed under the ring name Rezar.

After signing with WWE in 2015, Rezar has since teamed with Akam as part of The Authors of Pain, with whom he has held the NXT Tag Team Championship and WWE Raw Tag Team Championship once, and they also won the 2016 Dusty Rhodes Tag Team Classic tournament. To date, Selmani is the first and only Kosovo Albanian to ever wrestle in the WWE.

== Early life ==
Gzim Selmani was born on 16 June 1994 in Amsterdam, Netherlands, and grew up in Huizen. He is an ethnic Kosovo Albanian, with roots from Mitrovicë. He began practicing judo from the age of four, took up kickboxing at age 12 and began training in mixed martial arts alongside his brother Egzon, at the age of 15. Selmani became Professional Kickboxing Heavyweight Champion, after an 8-man tournament in one night, that took place in Bremerhaven, Germany.

== Mixed martial arts career ==
Selmani joined Golden Glory management team and began to compete in amateur mixed martial arts Shooto competitions in the Netherlands in 2012. His first professional fight was on 8 July 2012 against Kaan Postaci in The Hague The Netherlands. He ended up knocking him out with a knee left hook combo. He won his second fight at Shooto Europe against Jorrit Leeman. On 24 November 2012 Selmani Fought Anatoli Ciumac in Brașov, Romania, which he won. He faced Ante Delija at Final Fight Championship 05 and lost by TKO. Selmani defeated Mario Milosavljevic in November 2013 to record his second professional victory, and beat Tomaž Simonič at FFC 10 in Skopje, Macedonia. Selmani defeated Oli Thompson in 18 seconds in the main event of BAMMA 15 on 5 April 2014 in London. Selmani competed for Bellator MMA at Bellator 130 in October 2014, losing via TKO to Daniel Gallemore.

== Professional wrestling career ==
=== WWE (2015–2020) ===
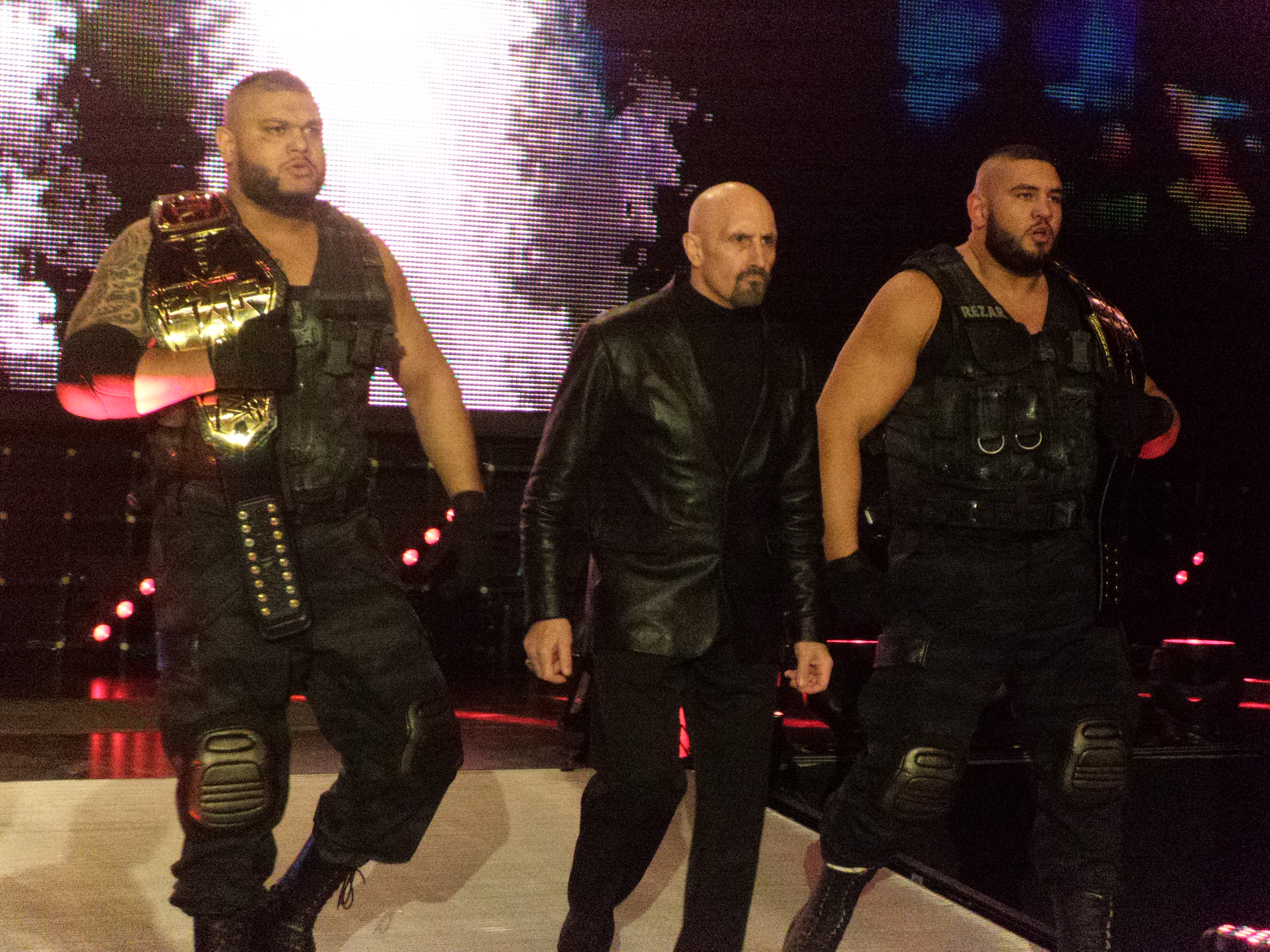
Akam (left) and Rezar (right) with Paul Ellering (middle), as the NXT Tag Team Champions in February 2017

Selmani was invited to a tryout in Dubai, and it was William Regal's choice to get him to sign a contract for WWE. In May 2015, it was reported that Selmani had signed a contract with WWE and would begin training to become a professional wrestler at the WWE Performance Center. In October 2015, WWE confirmed that Selmani was a WWE developmental recruit already training at the Performance Center. He made his in-ring debut at a NXT house show in Venice, Florida on 30 January 2016, losing to Josh Woods. By February 2016, Selmani had formed a tag team with Sunny Dhinsa, and they became known as The Authors of Pain by April 2016.

Selmani and Dhinsa made their televised NXT debuts on 8 June 2016 at NXT TakeOver: The End; following the NXT Tag Team Championship match, they attacked champions American Alpha (Chad Gable and Jason Jordan) before leaving backstage with Paul Ellering. On 15 June episode of NXT, the Authors of Pain won their first televised match and were managed by Ellering. On 24 August episode of NXT Selmani's ring name was revealed to be Rezar, while Dhinsa was billed as Akam. The duo won the 2016 Dusty Rhodes Tag Team Classic, defeating TM61 in the tournament final at NXT TakeOver: Toronto. At NXT TakeOver: San Antonio, the Authors of Pain defeated #DIY to win the NXT Tag Team Championship. They retained the title at NXT TakeOver: Orlando by defeating #DIY and The Revival in a Triple Threat Tag Team Elimination match by eliminating both teams. At NXT TakeOver: Chicago, the duo participated in the first NXT Takeover main event for the NXT Tag Team Championship by defeating #DIY in a ladder match to retain the title. At NXT TakeOver: Brooklyn III, the Authors of Pain lost the titles to SAnitY. at NXT TakeOver: WarGames, Authors of Pain and Roderick Strong competed in a 3 team WarGames match which was won by The Undisputed Era. On 20 December episode of NXT, Authors of Pain lost the NXT Tag Team Championship to Bobby Fish and Kyle O'Reilly. At NXT TakeOver: Philadelphia, Authors of Pain had a rematch but failed. At NXT TakeOver: New Orleans, Authors of Pain competed in a Triple threat tag team match for the NXT Tag Team Championship and Dusty Rhodes Tag Team Classic trophy which was won by The Undisputed Era (Adam Cole and Kyle O'Reilly).

On 9 April episode of Raw, The Authors of Pain, along with Ellering, made their main roster debut, defeating Heath Slater and Rhyno. After the match, Akam and Rezar ended their partnership with Ellering by pushing him away and leaving him ringside as they returned backstage. On 3 September episode of Raw, The Authors of Pain, now under the shortened name of "AOP", were accompanied to the ring by the 205 Live General Manager, Drake Maverick, who announced himself as their new manager.

On 5 November episode of Raw, The Authors of Pain defeated Seth Rollins in a handicap match to win the Raw Tag Team Championship for the first time. They went on to defeat SmackDown's Tag Team Champions Cesaro and Sheamus in an interbrand Champion vs Champion match at Survivor Series. They lost the titles to Bobby Roode and Chad Gable on 10 December episode of Raw. In January 2019 Akam suffered an undisclosed leg injury that reportedly would keep him out for “at least a few months”. He and Akam returned to action at Super ShowDown on 7 June 2019.

In September 2019, AOP began appearing in vignettes, warning of their return. During the 2019 WWE Draft in October, AOP went undrafted, becoming free agents and able to choose which brand to sign with. Three days after the draft's conclusion, AOP signed with Raw, remaining on the brand. Rezar started to show up with Akam as Seth Rollins' disciples. In March 2020, it was reported that Rezar suffered a bicep injury and the injury would sideline him for six to eight months. On 4 September 2020, AOP were released from their WWE contracts.

=== Independent circuit (2022) ===
In May 2022, Gzim Selmani and Sunny Dhinsa, now known as Legion of Pain, announced the launch of their professional wrestling promotion, Wrestling Entertainment Series (WES).

=== Return to WWE (2023–2025) ===
According to a report from Sean Ross Sapp of Fightful on 30 August 2023, the Authors of Pain had been re-signed with the WWE in 2022 prior to the return of Vince McMahon as chairman in January 2023 and they were on the internal travel list as of May 2023.

During the 22 December, episode of SmackDown, Rezar along with Akam were shown in vignettes by Karrion Kross and Scarlett that they will be returning as part of an alliance. On SmackDown: New Year's Revolution, Rezar, alongside Akam and Paul Ellering made their televised return to WWE, assisting Karrion Kross and Scarlett in attacking Bobby Lashley and the Street Profits, confirming their alliance in the process. AOP made their return to the ring on 16 February edition of SmackDown where they faced NXT talents Beau Morris and Javier Bernal in a squash match. At Night 2 of WrestleMania XL, the stable lost against The Pride in a Philadelphia Street Fight. On the following episode of NXT, The Final Testament made their NXT return with AOP attacking Axiom and Nathan Frazer, who have just won the NXT Tag Team Championships from Baron Corbin and Bron Breakker.

During night 2 of the WWE Draft, which occurred on 29 April 2024, Rezar was drafted to WWE Raw, with the rest of The Final Testament. At Week 2 of Spring Breakin', Rezar and Akam was unsuccessful at winning the NXT Tag Team Champions from Axiom and Nathan Frazer after interference from New Catch Republic. Both members of the Authors of Pain and their manager Paul Ellering were released from their contracts on 7 February 2025.

In a March 2026 interview with Ariel Helwani, Selmani claimed that a legitimate backstage altercation involving an unnamed member of the Wyatt Sicks, who he described to be “very unprofessional” due to the member refusing to take a move during a match, led to the Authors of Pain's release.

== Bare-knuckle boxing ==
Selmani faced Daniel Curtin on 14 March 2026 in the main event at BKFC Fight Night 34. He won the fight by knockout in the second round.

Selmani was scheduled to face Brad Lee on 17 October 2026 at BKFC 95, but the bout was removed for undisclosed reasons.

Selmani was scheduled to face Rob Cunningham on 7 November 2026 at BKFC 96. However, Cunningham withdrew and was replaced by Reece Heer. Selmani won the fight by unanimous decision.

== Other media ==
Rezar made his video game debut as a playable character in WWE 2K18 and has since appeared in WWE 2K19, WWE 2K20, and WWE 2K Battlegrounds.

== Championship and accomplishments ==
- Pro Wrestling Illustrated
  - Ranked No. 211 of the top 500 singles wrestlers in the PWI 500 in 2018 and 2019
- WWE
  - WWE Raw Tag Team Championship (1 time) – with Akam
  - NXT Tag Team Championship (1 time) – with Akam
  - Dusty Rhodes Tag Team Classic (2016) – with Akam

== Bare knuckle record ==
Professional record breakdown
| 2 matches | 2 wins | 0 losses |
| By knockout | 1 | 0 |
| By decision | 1 | 0 |

| Res. | Record | Opponent | Method | Event | Date | Round | Time | Location | Notes |
|---|---|---|---|---|---|---|---|---|---|
| Win | 2–0 | Reece Heer | Decision (unanimous) | BKFC 96 | 7 November 2026 | 5 | 2:00 | Glasgow, Scotland | |
| Win | 1–0 | Daniel Curtin | KO | BKFC Fight Night Newcastle: Terrill vs. McFarlane | 14 March 2026 | 2 | 0:22 | Newcastle upon Tyne, England | |

== Mixed martial arts record ==
Professional record breakdown
| 6 matches | 4 wins | 2 losses |
| By knockout | 1 | 2 |
| By submission | 3 | 0 |

| Res. | Record | Opponent | Method | Event | Date | Round | Time | Location | Notes |
|---|---|---|---|---|---|---|---|---|---|
| Loss | 4–2 | Daniel Gallemore | TKO (punches) | Bellator 130 | 24 October 2014 | 2 | 4:33 | Mulvane, Kansas, United States | |
| Win | 4–1 | Oli Thompson | Technical Submission (guillotine choke) | BAMMA 15 | 5 April 2014 | 1 | 0:18 | London, England | |
| Win | 3–1 | Tomaž Simonič | Submission (arm-triangle choke) | Final Fight Championship 10 | 13 December 2013 | 1 | 1:54 | Skopje, Macedonia | |
| Win | 2–1 | Mario Milosavljevic | Submission (guillotine choke) | Bosnian Fight Championship 1 | 9 November 2013 | 1 | 0:35 | Sarajevo, Bosnia and Herzegovina | |
| Loss | 1–1 | Ante Delija | TKO (punches) | Final Fight Championship 5 | 24 May 2013 | 1 | 3:09 | Osijek, Croatia | |
| Win | 1–0 | Anatoli Ciumac | TKO (retirement) | Klash Champions Battlefield: Road to Glory | 24 November 2012 | 2 | 5:00 | Brașov, Romania | Heavyweight debut. |
