= Akam (wrestler) =

Canadian professional and amateur wrestler

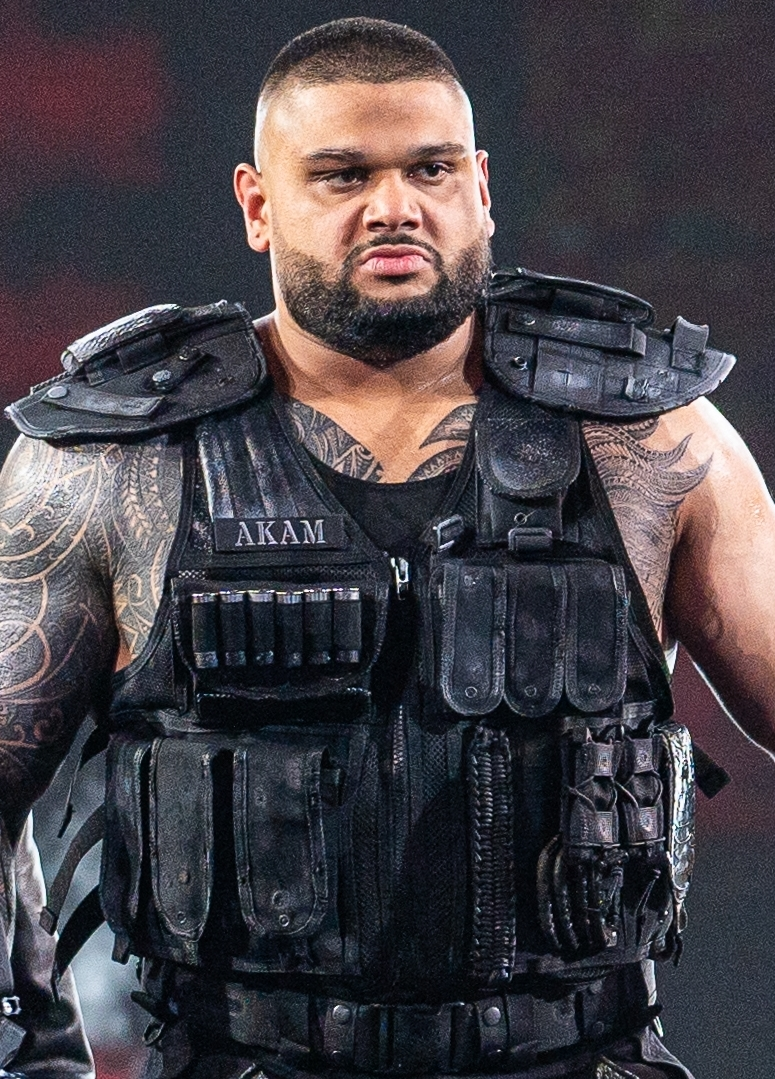
- Akam in 2024

Personal information
- Born: Sunny Dhinsa; May 20, 1993 (age 33) Abbotsford, British Columbia, Canada
- Education: Simon Fraser University

Professional wrestling career
- Ring name(s): Akam; Sunny Dhinsa
- Billed height: 6 ft 3 in (191 cm)
- Billed weight: 290 lb (132 kg)
- Trained by: WWE Performance Center
- Debut: April 4, 2015

Sunny Dhinsa (born May 20, 1993) is a Canadian professional wrestler and former amateur wrestler. He is best known for his time in WWE, where he performed under the ring name Akam.

After signing with WWE in 2014, Akam has since teamed with Rezar as part of The Authors of Pain, with whom he has held the NXT Tag Team Championship and WWE Raw Tag Team Championship once, and they also won the 2016 Dusty Rhodes Tag Team Classic tournament.

== Early life ==
Sunny Dhinsa was born on May 20, 1993, in Abbotsford, British Columbia.

== Amateur wrestling career ==
Sunny Dhinsa
Medal record
Men's freestyle wrestling
Representing Canada
Pan American Games
Silver medal – second place	2011 Guadalajara	120 kg

Dhinsa attended Simon Fraser University, where he was a standout collegiate wrestler. He won the Canadian national freestyle wrestling champion in 2011, 2012 and 2013 in the heavyweight category. He won a gold medal in the 115 kg category at the 2009 Canada Summer Games, and a silver medal at the 2011 Pan American Games in Guadalajara. Dhinsa competed in the qualification tournament for the 2012 Summer Olympics, missing out on qualification after losing to Dremiel Byers. He was considered a prospect for the 2016 Summer Olympics but left amateur wrestling after being offered a contract with WWE in 2014, having been scouted for the company by Gerald Brisco.

== Professional wrestling career ==
=== WWE (2014–2020) ===
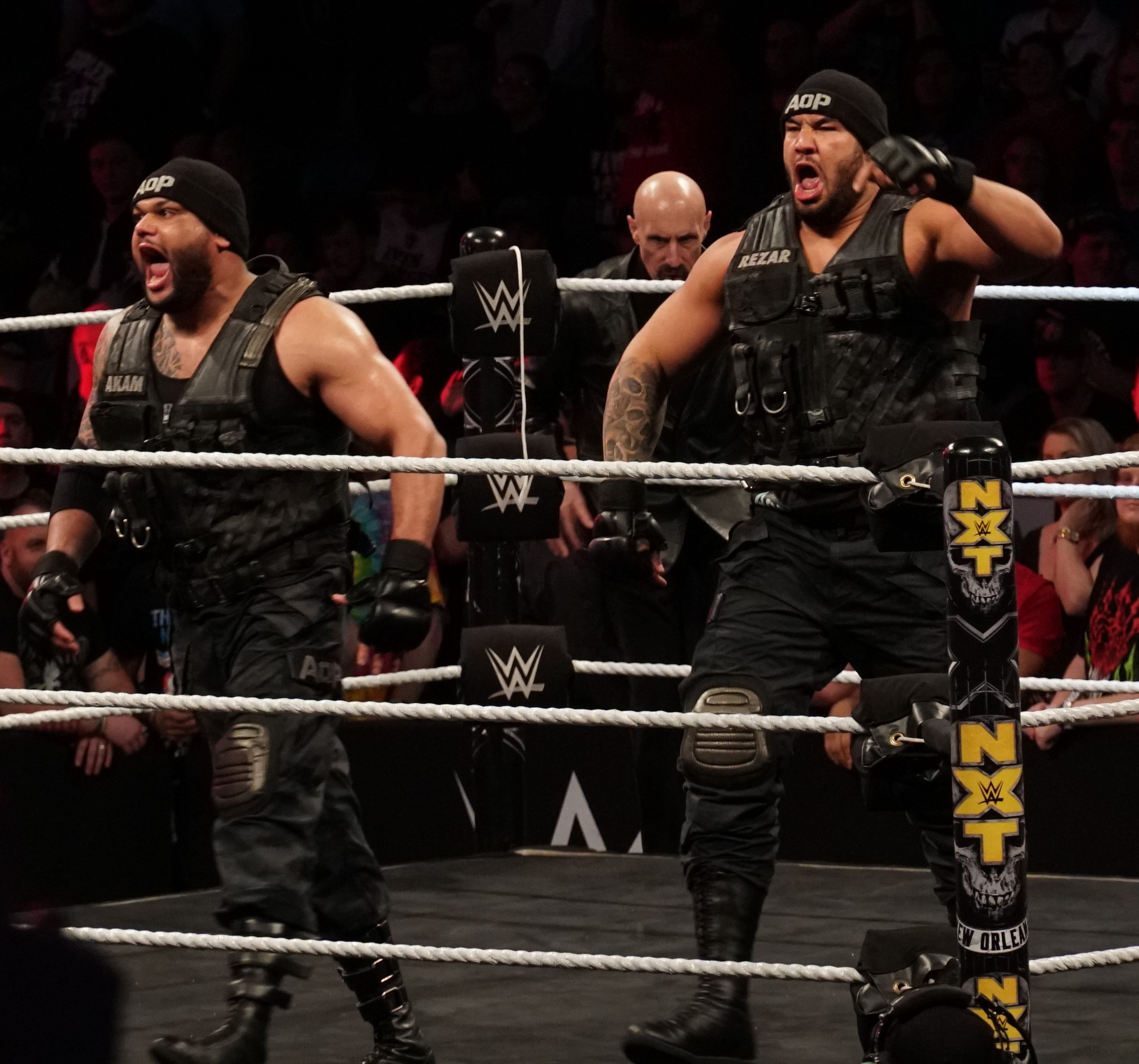
Akam (left) and Rezar (right) with Paul Ellering (back, on ring apron) in April 2018

In October 2014, Dhinsa was reported to have signed a contract with WWE and would begin training to become a professional wrestler at the WWE Performance Center. He made his in-ring debut at a NXT house show in Orlando, Florida on April 4, 2015, competing in a battle royal, which was won by Scott Dawson. By February 2016 Dhinsa had formed a tag team with Gzim Selmani and they became known as the Authors of Pain in April 2016.

Dhinsa and Selmani (billed as Akam and Rezar) made their televised NXT debuts on June 8, 2016, at NXT TakeOver: The End; following the NXT Tag Team Championship match, they attacked former champions American Alpha (Chad Gable and Jason Jordan) before being joined on stage by veteran manager Paul Ellering. The duo had a push during his time in NXT, winning the Dusty Rhodes Tag Team Classic, after defeating TM-61 at NXT TakeOver: Toronto and winning at NXT TakeOver: San Antonio the NXT Tag Team Championship when they defeated #DIY. The duo retained the titles at NXT TakeOver: Orlando (by defeating #DIY and The Revival in a triple threat tag team elimination match by eliminating both teams) and NXT TakeOver: Chicago (by defeating #DIY) in a ladder match to retain the titles. The duo turned face on August 9 edition of NXT after being attacked by SAnitY. At NXT TakeOver: Brooklyn III, the Authors of Pain lost the titles to SAnitY at NXT TakeOver: WarGames, Authors of Pain and Roderick Strong competed in a 3 team WarGames match which was won by The Undisputed Era. At NXT TakeOver: Philadelphia, Authors of Pain got a rematch but failed to win back the titles. At NXT TakeOver: New Orleans, Authors of Pain competed in a Triple threat tag team match for the NXT Tag Team Championship and Dusty Rhodes Tag Team Classic trophy which was won by The Undisputed Era (Adam Cole and Kyle O'Reilly).

On the April 9 episode of Raw, The Authors of Pain, along with Ellering, made their main roster debut, defeating Heath Slater and Rhyno. After the match, Akam and Rezar ended their partnership with Ellering by pushing him away and leaving him ringside as they returned backstage. On the September 3 episode of Raw, The Authors of Pain, now under the shortened name of "AOP", were accompanied to the ring by the 205 Live General Manager, Drake Maverick, who announced himself as their new manager.

On the November 5 episode of Raw, The Authors of Pain defeated Seth Rollins in a handicap match to win the Raw Tag Team Championship for the first time. They went on to defeat SmackDown's Tag Team Champions Cesaro and Sheamus in an interbrand Champion vs Champion match at Survivor Series. They lost the titles to Bobby Roode and Chad Gable on the December 10 episode of Raw. In January 2019 Akam suffered an undisclosed leg injury that reportedly would keep him out for "at least a few months". He would be cleared to return to action in May, however the team has yet to return to action. He and Rezar returned to action at Super ShowDown on June 7, 2019.

In September 2019, AOP began appearing in vignettes, warning of their return. During the 2019 WWE Draft in October, AOP went undrafted, becoming free agents and able to choose which brand to sign with. Three days after the draft's conclusion, AOP signed with Raw, remaining on the brand. Then, they started allying with Seth Rollins after they helped beat down Kevin Owens on the Raw after Survivor Series. In March 2020, it was reported that Rezar suffered a bicep injury, therefore putting the team on hiatus. Akam was last seen in WWE on the April 1 taping of Main Event, where he escorted Murphy to the ring for a match. On September 4, 2020, AOP were released from their WWE contracts.

=== Independent circuit (2020–2022) ===
In May 2022, Sunny Dhinsa and Gzim Selmani, now known as Legion of Pain, announced the launch of their professional wrestling promotion, Wrestling Entertainment Series (WES).

=== Return to WWE (2023–2025) ===
According to a report from Sean Ross Sapp of Fightful on August 30, 2023, the Authors of Pain had re-signed with WWE in 2022 prior to the return of Vince McMahon as chairman in January 2023 and they were on the internal travel list as of May 2023.

During the December 22, 2023 episode of SmackDown, Akam and Rezar were shown in a vignette by Karrion Kross to join him and are set to return in the coming weeks. On SmackDown: New Year's Revolution, Akam, alongside Rezar and Paul Ellering made their televised return and assisted Karrion Kross and Scarlett in attacking Bobby Lashley and the Street Profits (Angelo Dawkins and Montez Ford), confirming their alliance in the process. AOP made their return to the ring on February 16 edition of SmackDown where they faced NXT talents Beau Morris and Javier Bernal in a squash match. At Night 2 of WrestleMania XL, the stable lost against The Pride in a Philadelphia Street Fight. On the following episode of NXT, The Final Testament made their NXT return with AOP attacking Axiom and Nathan Frazer, who have just won the NXT Tag Team Championships from Baron Corbin and Bron Breakker.

During night 2 of the WWE Draft, which occurred on April 29, 2024, Akam was drafted to WWE Raw, with the rest of The Final Testament. At Week 2 of Spring Breakin', Akam and Rezar was unsuccessful at winning the NXT Tag Team Champions from Axiom and Nathan Frazer after interference from New Catch Republic. Both members of the Authors of Pain and their manager Paul Ellering were released from their contracts on February 7, 2025.

== Other media ==
Akam made his video game debut as a playable character in WWE 2K18 and has since appeared in WWE SuperCard, WWE Champions, WWE 2K19, WWE 2K20, WWE 2K Battlegrounds and WWE 2K25.

== Championship and accomplishments ==
- Pro Wrestling Illustrated
  - Ranked No. 204 of the top 500 wrestlers in the PWI 500 in 2018
- WWE
  - NXT Tag Team Championship (1 time) – with Rezar
  - WWE Raw Tag Team Championship (1 time) – with Rezar
  - Dusty Rhodes Tag Team Classic (2016) – with Rezar
