= Authors of Pain =

Professional wrestling stable

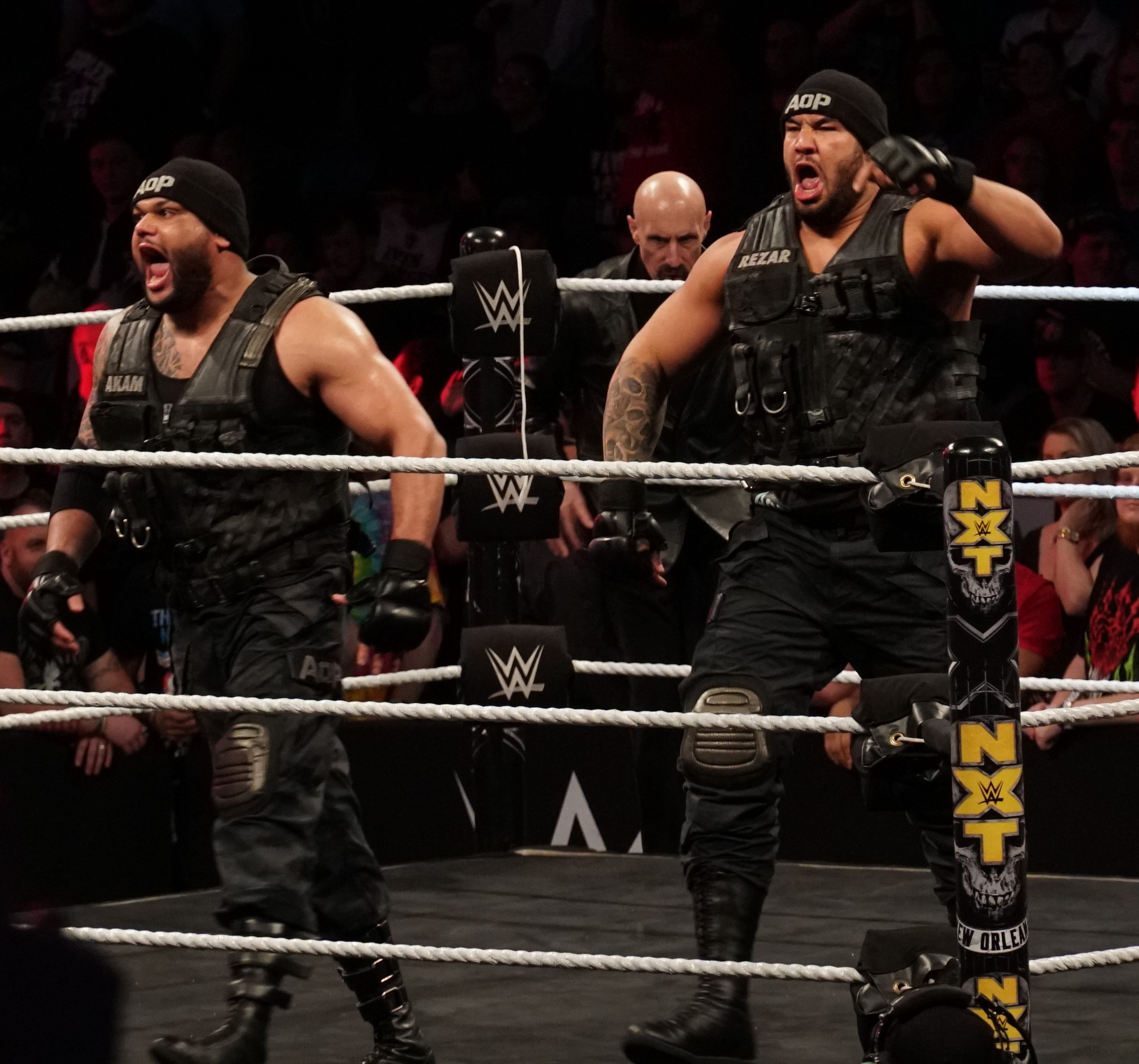
- Akam (left) and Rezar (right) with Paul Ellering (back, on ring apron) in April 2018

Tag team
- Members: Akam; Rezar; Paul Ellering (manager)
- Name(s): AOP; Authors of Pain; Legion of Pain
- Billed heights: Akam: 6 ft 2 in (1.88 m); Rezar: 6 ft 4 in (1.93 m)
- Combined billed weight: 620 lb (280 kg); Akam (290 lb), Rezar (330 lb)
- Former members: Drake Maverick (manager)
- Debut: June 8, 2016
- Years active: 2016–2020; 2023–2025

The Authors of Pain (AOP) were a professional wrestling tag team consisting of Akam and Rezar, with Paul Ellering as their manager. They are best known for their tenure in WWE, where they were former one-time Raw Tag Team Champions and one-time NXT Tag Team Champions.

Akam and Rezar first teamed up in June 2016, paired with manager Paul Ellering in WWE's then developmental league NXT. They won the Dusty Rhodes Tag Team Classic in 2016, leading to them winning the NXT Tag Team Championship. In April 2018, Akam and Rezar were promoted to the Raw brand, with Drake Maverick taking over as their manager and the team's name officially shortened to AOP. AOP took a hiatus in early 2019 and returned later that year, but without Maverick as their manager and later becoming enforcers to Seth Rollins until their release from the company in September 2020. They re-signed with WWE in 2023, and made their televised return in January 2024, once again aligning themselves with Ellering, as well as with Karrion Kross and Scarlett starting a stable called The Final Testament until their second release from the company the following year.

== History ==
=== WWE (2016–2020) ===
==== NXT Tag Team Champions (2016–2018) ====
The team of Sunny Dhinsa and Gzim Selmani made their televised NXT debut as heels on June 8, 2016 at NXT TakeOver: The End, attacking American Alpha (Jason Jordan and Chad Gable) after they had lost the NXT Tag Team Championship to The Revival (Scott Dawson and Dash Wilder). Paul Ellering appeared on the ramp following the assault, signalling his association with the two.

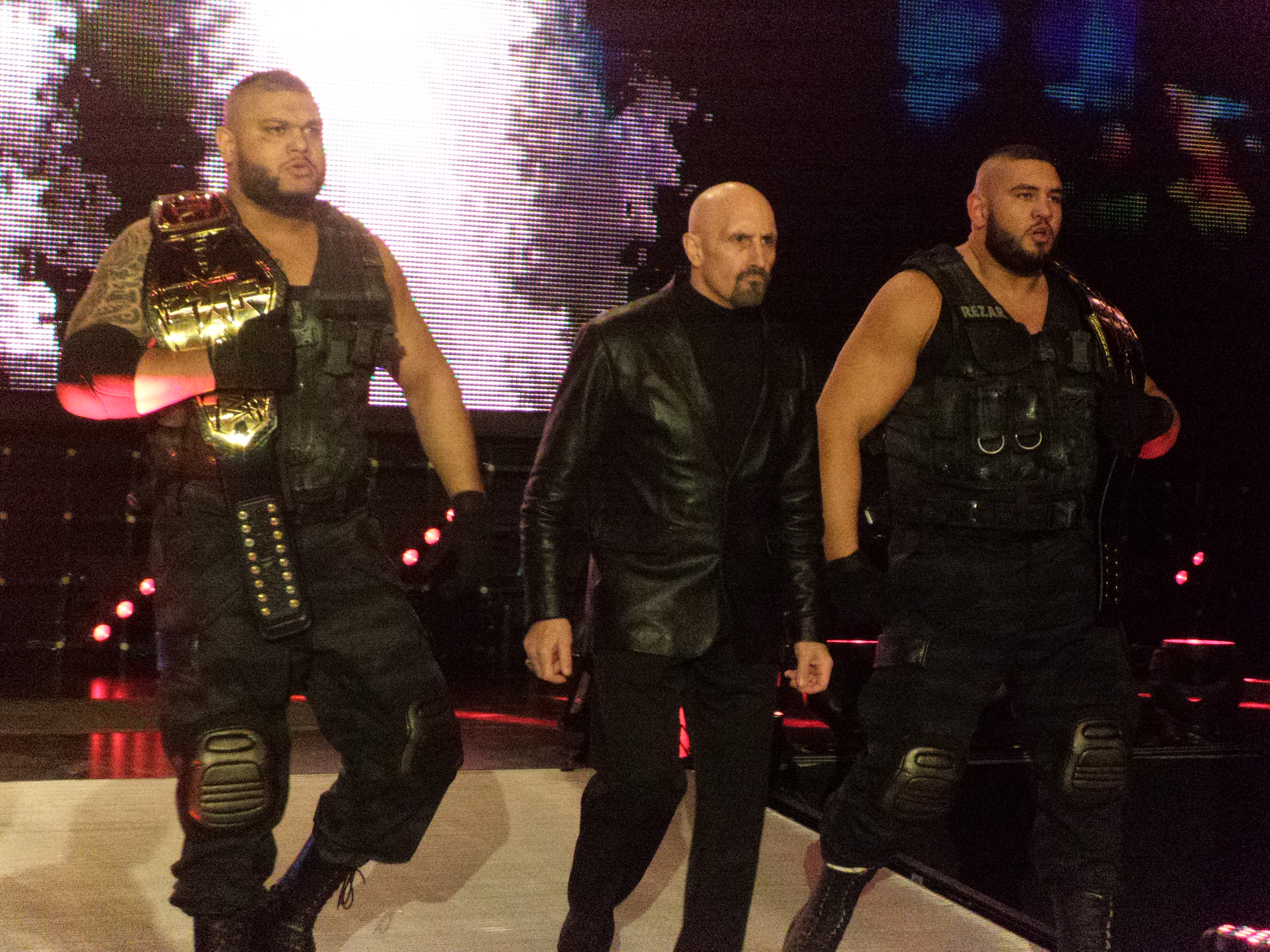
The Authors of Pain, accompanied by Paul Ellering, as NXT Tag Team Champions in February 2017

On June 15 episode of NXT, Dhinsa and Selmani, now going by the ring names of Akam and Rezar respectively, and the team officially named the Authors of Pain won their first televised match and were accompanied by Ellering. On November 19, the duo won the 2016 Dusty Rhodes Tag Team Classic, defeating TM-61 in the tournament final at NXT TakeOver: Toronto. On the January 11, 2017 episode of NXT, they assaulted #DIY (Johnny Gargano and Tommaso Ciampa) after they retained the NXT Tag Team Championship against The Revival. At NXT TakeOver: San Antonio, they won the NXT Tag Team Championship by defeating #DIY. On the March 1 episode of NXT, The Authors of Pain defended their titles against #DIY in a rematch, which ended in a no contest after The Revival interfered and attacked both teams. They retained the titles at NXT TakeOver: Orlando by both defeating #DIY and The Revival in a triple threat elimination match after eliminating both teams. At NXT TakeOver: Chicago, the duo participated in the first-ever ladder match for the NXT Tag Team Championship against #DIY, which they won.

On the July 26 episode of NXT, the two were set to compete, but their opponents were attacked by SAnitY before the match began. They then brawled with Alexander Wolfe and Killian Dain, disposing of the two before a staredown. Two weeks later, SAnitY called out The Authors of Pain, who were attacked by Eric Young as they made their way down the ramp. Young zip-tied Rezar to the barricade, allowing SAnitY to beat down Akam. Rezar eventually made his way to the ring, but was ultimately attacked as well. At NXT TakeOver: Brooklyn III, The Authors of Pain lost the NXT Tag Team Championship to SAnitY, who were represented by Wolfe and Young after the latter replaced Killian Dain mid-match, marking their first loss in NXT. At NXT TakeOver: WarGames, the Authors of Pain turned face as they teamed with Roderick Strong in a WarGames match against SAnitY and The Undisputed Era (Adam Cole, Kyle O'Reilly, and Bobby Fish), who won the match. At NXT TakeOver: Philadelphia, The Authors of Pain unsuccessfully challenged The Undisputed Era for the NXT Tag Team Championship. AoP again challenged The Undisputed Era for the NXT Tag Team Championship in a triple threat match also involving the team of Strong and WWE United Kingdom Champion Pete Dunne at NXT TakeOver: New Orleans, but lost. This would be their final match in NXT.

==== Raw Tag Team Champions (2018–2019) ====
On the April 9 episode of Raw, The Authors of Pain, along with Paul Ellering, made their main roster debut as heels, defeating Heath Slater and Rhyno. After the match, Akam and Rezar ended their partnership with Ellering by pushing him away and leaving him ringside as they returned backstage. The Authors of Pain entered a brief feud with Titus Worldwide (Titus O'Neil and Apollo Crews), defeating them on the August 20 episode of Raw to end their feud. On the September 3 episode of Raw, The Authors of Pain, now under the shortened name of AOP, were accompanied to the ring by Drake Maverick, who announced himself as their new manager.

On the November 5 episode of Raw, AOP defeated Seth Rollins in a handicap match to win the Raw Tag Team Championship. At Survivor Series, they defeated SmackDown Tag Team Champions The Bar in an interbrand match. The following night on Raw, AOP suffered an upset loss to the team of Bobby Roode and Chad Gable, marking their first loss on the main roster. On the December 10 episode of Raw, they lost their tag titles to Roode and Gable in a three-on-two handicap match that also involved their manager Maverick, ending their reign at 35 days. After this, the team went on hiatus due to Akam having knee surgery in January 2019. Maverick would subsequently go in his own direction, maintaining his duties as the 205 Live General Manager and then chasing after the 24/7 Championship introduced in May. AOP returned during the 51-Man Battle Royal at Super ShowDown on June 7, but they were both eliminated during the match.

On the September 16 episode of Raw, AOP, without Maverick, returned in a vignette, where they called out the tag team division for being soft and weak and announced their intentions of returning. The following week, they would attack Heath Slater and No Way Jose backstage. During the 2019 WWE draft, AOP went undrafted, becoming free agents and able to choose which brand to sign with, however, three days after the draft's conclusion, AOP signed with Raw to remain on the brand.

==== Seth Rollins' enforcers (2019–2020) ====
After they made their in-ring return on the November 25 episode of Raw, they allied with Seth Rollins and later, Buddy Murphy. Their final appearance was on the March 9 episode of Raw. On March 10, Rezar suffered a biceps injury, putting the team on hiatus. On September 4, both Akam and Rezar were released from their WWE contract.

=== Independent circuit (2022) ===
In May 2022, Sunny Dhinsa and Gzim Selmani, now known as Legion of Pain, announced the launch of their professional wrestling promotion, Wrestling Entertainment Series (WES). The promotion's first event was booked for June, but it was delayed until July until it was cancelled. The promotion stated that several wrestlers wouldn't appear as the reason. Nia Jax and Aiden English, who were booked to appear on the show, criticized the promotion.

=== Return to WWE (2024–2025) ===
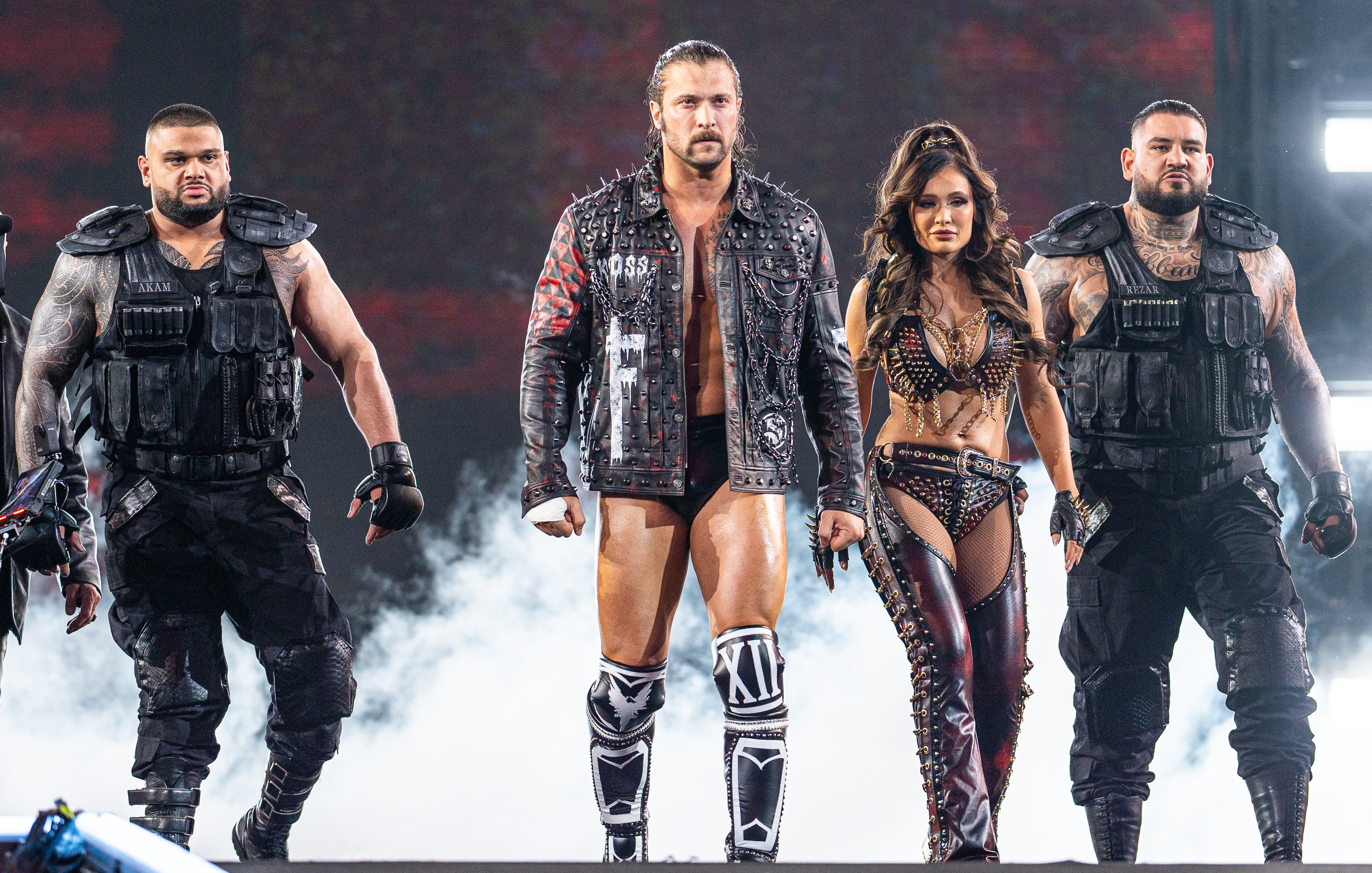
The Final Testament at WrestleMania XL

They returned as part of a stable, The Final Testament, along with Karrion Kross, Scarlett Bordeaux and Paul Ellering. They first appeared on SmackDown: New Year's Revolution, attacking The Pride (Bobby Lashley and the Street Profits (Angelo Dawkins and Montez Ford)). The two stables wrestled at Night 2 of WrestleMania XL, where The Final Testament lost in a Philadelphia Street Fight. On the following episode of NXT, The Final Testament made their NXT return with AOP attacking Axiom and Nathan Frazer, who had just won the NXT Tag Team Championship from Baron Corbin and Bron Breakker. On Night 2 of the 2024 WWE Draft, The Final Testament were drafted to the Raw brand. During Week 2 of NXT: Spring Breakin', AOP failed to defeat Axiom and Frazer for the NXT Tag Titles after interference from New Catch Republic.

After being drafted to Raw, The Final Testament began to drive wedges into various teams across the brand; after successfully turning The New Day against one another (with Kross implying Kofi Kingston was holding Xavier Woods back from a successful singles career) and then doing the same with Awesome Truth (allying with The Miz in the process), The Final Testament then began to be targeted by The Wyatt Sicks (Uncle Howdy, Erik Rowan, Joe Gacy, Dexter Lumis, and Nikki Cross). On the December 9 episode of Raw, The Final Testament and The Miz defeated The Wyatt Sicks in an eight-man tag team match, ending their feud.

On February 7, 2025, the Authors of Pain were once again released from their WWE contracts, along with their manager, Paul Ellering, ending their second tenure. In a March 2026 interview with Ariel Helwani, Rezar claimed that a legitimate backstage altercation involving an unnamed member of The Wyatt Sicks, who he described to be “very unprofessional” due to the member refusing to take a move during a match, led to the Authors of Pain’s release.

== Other media ==
Akam and Rezar made their video game debut as playable characters with Paul Ellering appearing as their manager in WWE 2K18, they also appear as playable characters in WWE 2K19, WWE 2K20, WWE 2K Battlegrounds and WWE 2K25.

== Championship and accomplishments ==
- Pro Wrestling Illustrated
  - Ranked Akam No. 204 of the top 500 singles wrestlers in the PWI 500 in 2018
  - Ranked Rezar No. 211 of the top 500 singles wrestlers in the PWI 500 in 2018
- WWE
  - NXT Tag Team Championship (1 time)
  - WWE Raw Tag Team Championship (1 time)
  - Dusty Rhodes Tag Team Classic (2016)
