= NXT TakeOver: Chicago II =

2018 WWE Network event

- Promotional poster featuring various NXT wrestlers (the event was held at the Allstate Arena although the poster incorrectly says United Center)
- Promotion: WWE
- Brand: NXT
- Date: June 16, 2018
- City: Rosemont, Illinois
- Venue: Allstate Arena
- Attendance: 11,000

WWE event chronology
| ← Previous; Backlash | Next → Money in the Bank |

NXT TakeOver chronology
| ← Previous; New Orleans | Next → Brooklyn 4 |

NXT TakeOver: Chicago chronology
| ← Previous; I | Next → Last |

NXT TakeOver: Chicago II was a 2018 professional wrestling livestreaming event produced by WWE, held exclusively for wrestlers from the promotion's developmental brand, NXT. It was the 20th NXT TakeOver event and the second annual and final TakeOver: Chicago. It took place on June 16, 2018, at the Allstate Arena in the Chicago suburb of Rosemont, Illinois as part of that year's Money in the Bank weekend and aired exclusively on the WWE Network.

Five matches were contested at the event. In the main event, Tommaso Ciampa defeated Johnny Gargano in a Chicago Street Fight. On the undercard, Aleister Black defeated Lars Sullivan to retain the NXT Championship and Ricochet defeated Velveteen Dream.

== Production ==
=== Background ===
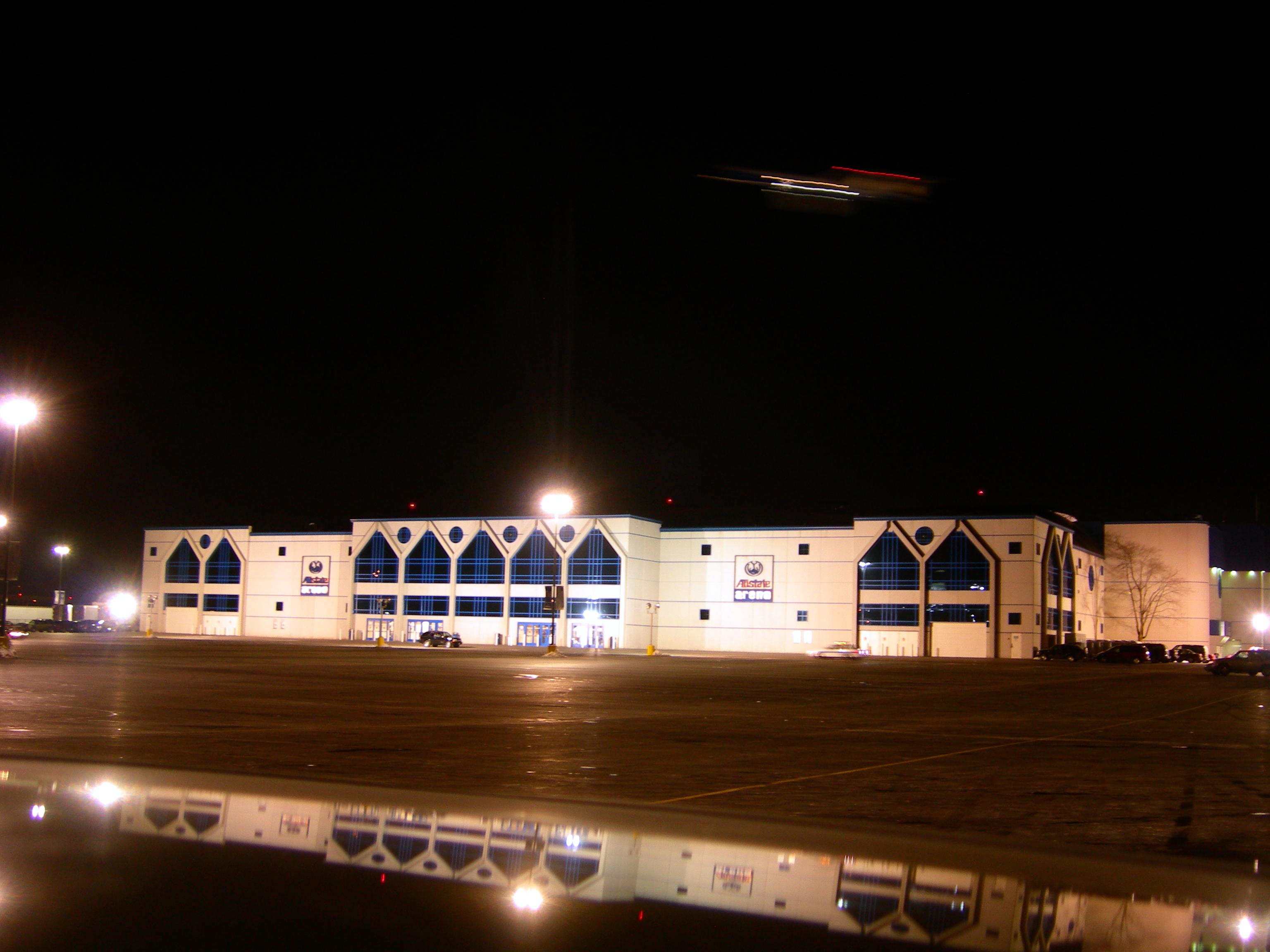
The 20th NXT TakeOver event was the second annual and final TakeOver: Chicago held at the Allstate Arena in the Chicago suburb of Rosemont, Illinois.

TakeOver was a series of professional wrestling events that began in May 2014, as WWE's developmental brand, NXT, held its second WWE Network-exclusive livestreaming event, billed as TakeOver. The "TakeOver" moniker subsequently became the branding for all of NXT's major events held periodically throughout the year. In May 2017, NXT held TakeOver: Chicago at the Allstate Arena in the Chicago suburb of Rosemont, Illinois as a support show for that year's Backlash for the main roster at the same venue. On November 23, 2017, the 20th TakeOver event was scheduled to return to the Allstate Arena on Saturday, June 16, 2018, as TakeOver: Chicago II, with this second edition held as a support show for that year's Money in the Bank for the main roster at the same venue. Tickets went on sale on April 14.

=== Storylines ===
The card comprised five matches that resulted from scripted storylines. Results were predetermined by WWE's writers on the NXT brand, while storylines were produced on WWE's weekly television program, NXT.

On the April 25 episode of NXT, Adam Cole defeated Oney Lorcan to retain the NXT North American Championship after interference from The Undisputed Era. After the match, The Undisputed Era attacked Lorcan. Danny Burch came out to help Lorcan, but was stopped by Cole. The following week, after Pete Dunne defeated Roderick Strong by disqualification, Lorcan and Burch saved Dunne from The Undisputed Era. On the May 16 episode of NXT, Dunne, Lorcan and Burch defeated The Undisputed Era in a six-man tag team match. The following week, a tag team match between The Undisputed Era and Lorcan and Burch for the NXT Tag Team Championship was scheduled for TakeOver: Chicago.

On the May 30 episode of NXT, Lars Sullivan was revealed as Aleister Black's challenger for the NXT Championship. A match between the two for the title was scheduled for TakeOver: Chicago.

At TakeOver: New Orleans, Johnny Gargano defeated Tommaso Ciampa in an unsanctioned match. On the April 25 episode of NXT, Gargano was scheduled to face Aleister Black for the NXT Championship, but Ciampa attacked Gargano to prevent the match from happening. On the May 16 episode, Gargano's wife Candice LeRae slapped Ciampa. The next week, Gargano called Ciampa out, which led to a brawl between the two in which Gargano was inadvertently knocked into his wife. The next week, a street fight between the two was scheduled for TakeOver: Chicago.

At TakeOver: New Orleans, Ricochet and Velveteen Dream both unsuccessfully competed in a ladder match to crown the first NXT North American Champion. On the May 9 episode of NXT, Velveteen Dream confronted Ricochet. A match between the two was scheduled for the following week, but the match ended in a no contest when Lars Sullivan attacked both wrestlers. On the May 23 episode of NXT, Sullivan defeated both men in a handicap match after Dream walked out on Ricochet. On the May 30 episode of NXT, a match between the two was scheduled for TakeOver: Chicago.

On the May 30 episode of NXT, after Shayna Baszler defeated Dakota Kai to retain the NXT Women's Championship, Baszler continued to attack Kai. Nikki Cross came out and made the save. Afterwards, Cross ran out with the title. The following week, Cross and Baszler confronted each, leading to a match between the two for the title at TakeOver: Chicago.

It was also announced that former Indianapolis Colts punter and Barstool Sports personality (at the time) Pat McAfee would join the pre-show panel.

== Event ==
Other on-screen personnel
| Role: | Name: |
|---|---|
| English commentators | Vic Joseph |
| English commentators | Nigel McGuinness |
| English commentators | Percy Watson |
| Spanish commentators | Carlos Cabrera |
| Spanish commentators | Marcelo Rodríguez |
| Ring announcer | Kayla Braxton |
| Referees | D.A. Brewer |
| Referees | Drake Wuertz |
| Referees | Eddie Orengo |
| Referees | Darryl Sharma |
| Pre-show panel | Charly Caruso |
| Pre-show panel | Sam Roberts |
| Pre-show panel | Pat McAfee |

=== Preliminary matches ===
The event opened with The Undisputed Era (Kyle O'Reilly and Roderick Strong) defending the NXT Tag Team Championship against Oney Lorcan and Danny Burch. O'Reilly and Strong performed "Total Elimination" on Lorcan to retain the titles.

Next, Ricochet faced Velveteen Dream. Ricochet performed a 630º senton on Dream to score the win.

After that, Shayna Baszler defended the NXT Women's Championship against Nikki Cross. In the end, Baszler applied the "Kirifuda Clutch" on Cross. Cross passed out, thus Bazler retained the title by technical submission.

In the penultimate match, Aleister Black defended the NXT Championship against Lars Sullivan. Sullivan performed a powerslam on the apron and diving headbutt for a nearfall. Black performed a "Black Mass" for a nearfall. The match ended when Sullivan attempted a "Freak Accident", but Black countered and performed two "Black Masses" on Sullivan to retain the title, marking Sullivan's first pinfall loss in NXT.

=== Main event ===
In the main event, Johnny Gargano faced Tommaso Ciampa. Before Gargano made his entrance for the match, Candice LeRae, Gargano's wife, handed Gargano a crutch to use as a weapon during the match. Gargano and Ciampa fought in the arena stands, where Gargano performed a crossbody on Ciampa off a stand. Ciampa threw Gargano, who was trapped in a chair, into the steel steps and threw a trash can at Gargano. Gargano struck Ciampa with a belt and performed a superkick into a trash can, which Ciampa was trapped in. Ciampa performed "Project Ciampa" and a running knee strike on Gargano for a near-fall. Ciampa performed another running knee strike using a trash can lid and an "Air Raid Crash" on Gargano onto the steel steps for a near-fall. Ciampa removed the ring canvas to expose the wooden floor boards. Gargano began to target Ciampa's leg, striking his leg with a chair. After Gargano collided with a trash can, which was wedged in the corner, Ciampa applied the "Garga-No-Escape", only for Gargano to escape. Ciampa struck Gargano with a crutch for a near-fall. Ciampa taunted Gargano on the stage, reminding him of Ciampa's attack on Gargano at NXT TakeOver: Chicago the previous year. Ciampa removed Gargano's wedding ring, spat on it and threw the ring. Gargano performed an "Air Raid Crash" on Ciampa off a production crate through two tables. As medical personnel attended Ciampa, Gargano, realizing what Ciampa did to his wedding ring, shoved a doctor into the referee and attacked Ciampa. Gargano applied the "Garga-No-Escape", with Ciampa submitting, however, officials forced Gargano to leave Ciampa, leading to Gargano attacking the officials. Gargano used handcuffs to bind Ciampa and performed superkicks on a kneeling Ciampa. Gargano again applied the "Garga-No-Escape", but more officials forced Gargano to leave Ciampa. Gargano exited the ring and attacked the officials. In the climax, Ciampa performed a DDT on Gargano onto the exposed floor board to win the match.

== Aftermath ==
Chicago II would be the last in the TakeOver: Chicago subseries of TakeOver events that were held at the Allstate Arena. TakeOver: WarGames the following year would also be held at the Allstate Arena; however, it was part of the WarGames subseries.

== Results ==
| No. | Results | Stipulations | Times |
|---|---|---|---|
| 1^{N} | Bianca Belair defeated Dakota Kai by pinfall | Singles match | 6:05 |
| 2^{N} | War Raiders (Hanson and Rowe) defeated The Mighty (Nick Miller and Shane Thorne) by pinfall | Tag team match | 4:28 |
| 3 | The Undisputed Era (Kyle O'Reilly and Roderick Strong) (c) (with Adam Cole) defeated Danny Burch and Oney Lorcan by pinfall | Tag team match for the NXT Tag Team Championship | 16:00 |
| 4 | Ricochet defeated Velveteen Dream by pinfall | Singles match | 22:10 |
| 5 | Shayna Baszler (c) defeated Nikki Cross by technical submission | Singles match for the NXT Women's Championship | 9:25 |
| 6 | Aleister Black (c) defeated Lars Sullivan by pinfall | Singles match for the NXT Championship | 14:07 |
| 7 | Tommaso Ciampa defeated Johnny Gargano by pinfall | Chicago Street Fight | 35:29 |
(c) / – the champion(s) heading into the match; N / – the match was taped for a future broadcast of NXT
