= Paul Ellering =

American professional wrestler and manager

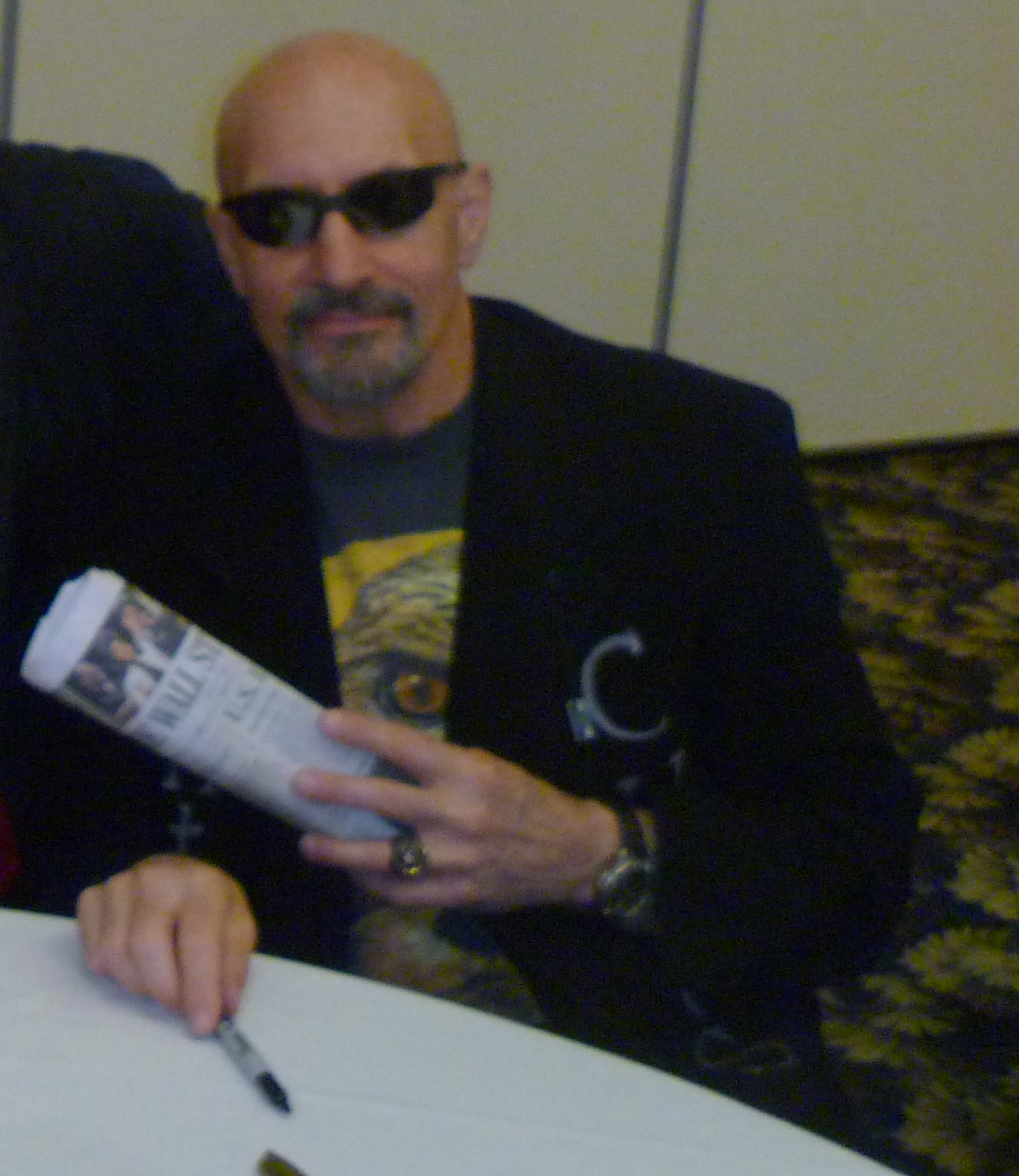
- Ellering in 2011

Personal information
- Born: August 22, 1953 (age 73) Melrose, Minnesota, U.S.
- Education: St. Cloud State University
- Spouse: Debra Randall (m. 1982)
- Children: 3; including Rachael Ellering

Professional wrestling career
- Ring name(s): The Body Doc; Mr. Dot Com; Paul Ellering
- Billed height: 5 ft 11 in (180 cm)
- Billed weight: 244 lb (111 kg)
- Trained by: Verne Gagne; Eddie Sharkey
- Debut: December 25, 1977

Paul Ellering (born August 22, 1953) is an American professional wrestling manager and retired professional wrestler.

Ellering is best known for managing the Road Warriors from 1983 until 1992 during their stints in Georgia Championship Wrestling, the American Wrestling Association, New Japan Pro-Wrestling, All-Japan Pro Wrestling, Jim Crockett Promotions / World Championship Wrestling, and the World Wrestling Federation in 1992. Ellering was also the real-life manager for the team; he booked their matches, lined up their flights, set up hotel reservations, and kept track of their expenses.

Retiring as an in-ring performer in 1992, Ellering spent most of his wrestling career managing the Road Warriors, working with them from 1983 to 1990 and again on occasion between 1992 and 1997. From 1998 to 1999, he briefly managed Disciples of Apocalypse. Ellering and the Road Warriors were inducted into both the Professional Wrestling Hall of Fame and the WWE Hall of Fame in 2011. In 2016, he returned to WWE at NXT TakeOver: The End as the manager of the Authors of Pain until 2018. He made his second on-screen return in 2024 as part of The Final Testament until his departure in 2025.

== Early life ==
Before entering the wrestling business, Ellering was an accomplished powerlifter, setting a world record in the deadlift at 745 pounds (338 kg) a record that has since been beaten.

== Professional wrestling career ==
=== Early career (1977–1982) ===
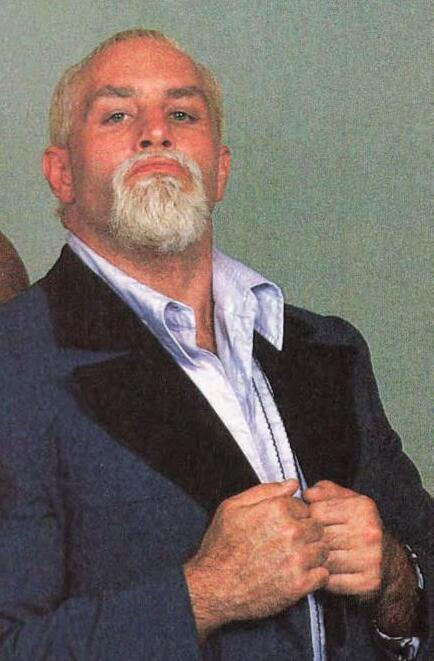
Ellering, c. 1985

Ellering was trained in Minneapolis, Minnesota at a camp run by American Wrestling Association (AWA) owner and promoter Verne Gagne and wrestler/trainer Eddie Sharkey in the mid-1970s. According to Ellering's RF Video shoot interview, of the thirty-plus trainees in the camp, only himself and later AWA mid-card wrestler Steve Olsonoski (a.k.a. Steve O) made it through the camp. Ellering would later go on to wrestle in singles and tag teams for Gagne in the AWA, Bill Watts's Mid-South promotion, and for Jerry Jarrett's Memphis promotion, where he was paired with manager Jimmy Hart. Ellering became known as "Precious" Paul Ellering. His notable feuds were with Jesse Ventura as a face, and as a heel with Jerry Lawler and Jimmy Valiant, from whom he won the AWA Southern Heavyweight Championship.

In April and May 1981, Ellering wrestled in Japan for the International Wrestling Enterprise promotion as part of its Big Challenge Series. During the tour, Ellering and Terry Latham defeated Mighty Inoue and Rusher Kimura in a two-out-of-three falls match to win the IWA World Tag Team Championship. Kusatsu and Inoue regained the titles Ellering and Latham from 12 days later.

=== Mid-South Wrestling (1980–1982) ===
While wrestling for Mid-South Wrestling from 1980 to 1982, Ellering severely injured his knee in a match with Robert Gibson. He started doing workout segments with kids for Mid South, re-injuring it after returning to the ring. The injury ended his full-time wrestling career.

=== Georgia Championship Wrestling (1982–1984) ===
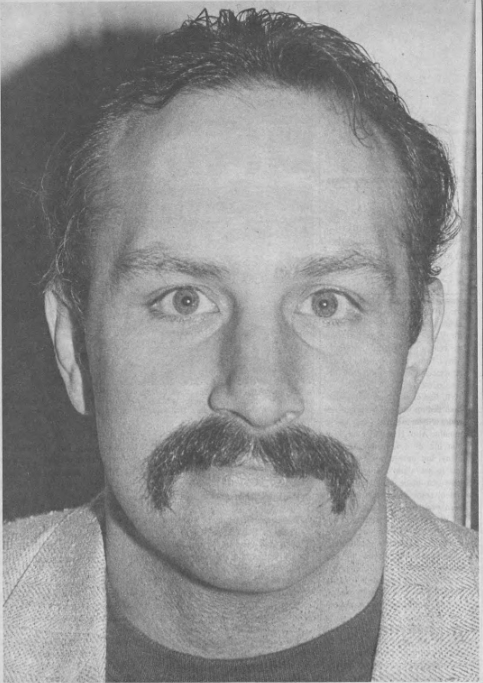
Ellering, c. 1987

Georgia booker Ole Anderson recognized his speaking ability, however, and gave him a job as a manager. Ellering formed a stable named the Legion of Doom including such wrestlers as The Spoiler, Jake Roberts and the Road Warriors. This was later reduced down to just the Warriors who held the NWA National Tag Team Championship three times.

=== American Wrestling Association (1984–1986) ===
The Road Warriors moved American Wrestling Association where they held the AWA World Tag Team Championship for a year, during which time the Warriors – and Ellering by association – turned fan favorite.

=== Jim Crockett Promotions / World Championship Wrestling (1986–1990) ===
Following the loss of the AWA tag title, Ellering and the Warriors headed to Jim Crockett Promotions where their accomplishments included the Crockett Cup (1986) and the WCW World Tag Team Championship in 1988 (the team and manager briefly turning villains to achieve the latter.) Although primarily a manager, Ellering stepped between the ropes as a competitor, notably at the 1987 NWA Great American Bash in which he joined the Road Warriors, Nikita Koloff, and Dusty Rhodes to face The Four Horsemen and their manager J. J. Dillon in the first ever WarGames match. Ellering would also face Teddy Long in a 'Hair vs. Hair' match at the World Championship Wrestling Capital Combat event in 1990, coming away with a victory.

=== World Wrestling Federation (1990–1999) ===
In 1990, Hawk, Animal and Ellering signed with the World Wrestling Federation, but despite that Ellering remained at the team's real-life manager behind the scenes, he wasn't assigned to be the team's on-screen manager. However, after The Legion of Doom (which was the name Hawk and Animal were now using) lost the tag team titles to Money Inc., they were taken off television for a month and when they returned at WrestleMania VIII during an interview with Gene Okerlund, Ellering returned as their on-screen manager and stayed with them until they left the WWF after SummerSlam 1992. During a promotional angle where Hawk and Animal "rediscovered" their childhood toy "Rocko", a ventriloquist's dummy, Ellering was the puppeteer and voice of the dummy.

Throughout 1998 he managed the Disciples of Apocalypse, who were then feuding with the Legion of Doom; according to Ellering and Animal on the Road Warriors DVD, Ellering had a hard time working with another team against Hawk and Animal, and had difficulty ripping on his former team on the microphone. By the end of his second WWF run, though, he was back to managing the LOD, most notably on Sunday Night Heat, during a tag-team battle royal for a shot at the tag titles later in the night at WrestleMania XV, though they were unsuccessful.

=== Return to WWE (2016–2018) ===
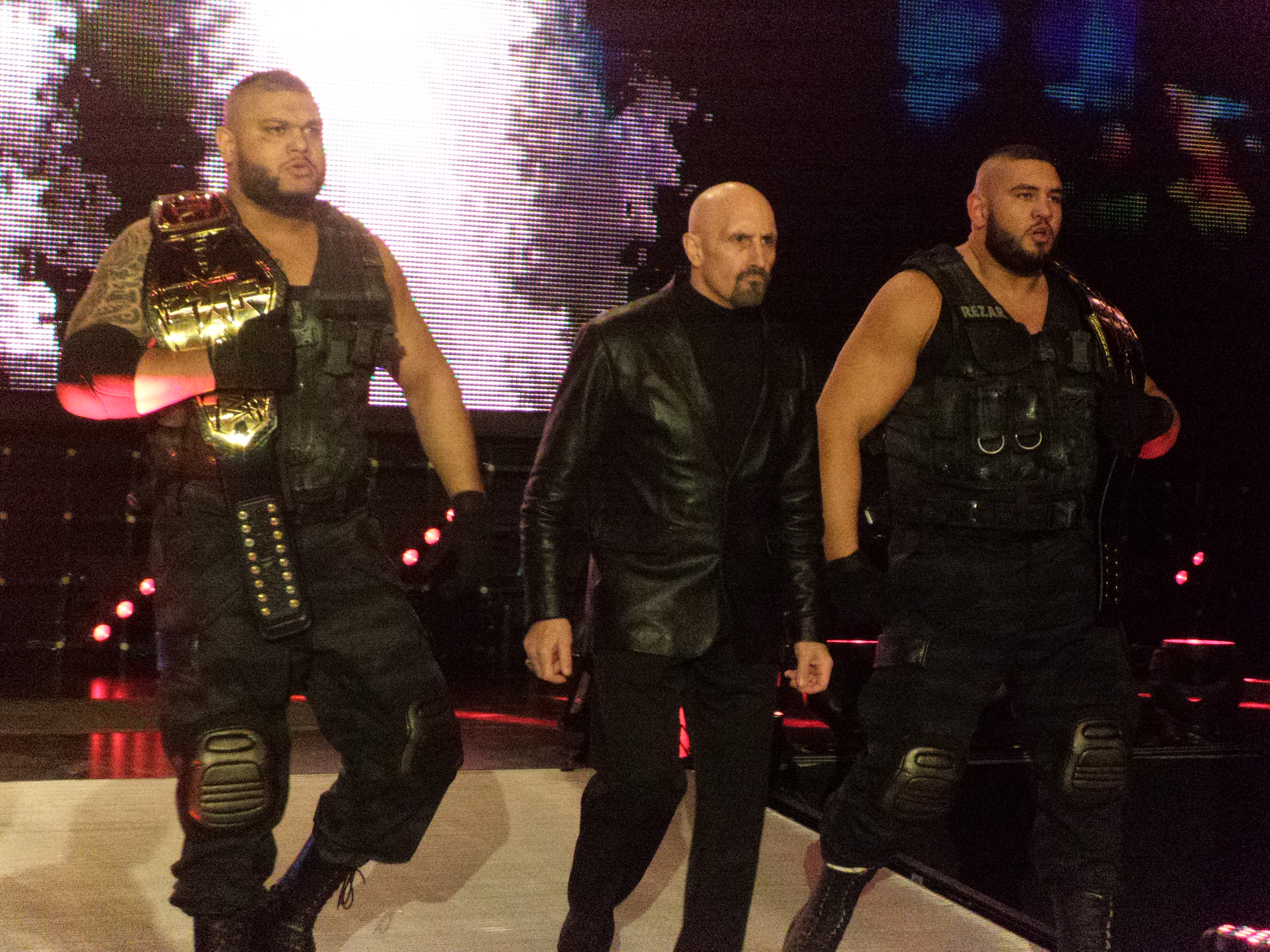
Ellering (center) with The Authors of Pain in February 2017

In 2011, Ellering was inducted into the WWE Hall of Fame, along with the Road Warriors, by Dusty Rhodes.

Ellering made his return to WWE programming at NXT TakeOver: The End on June 8, 2016, revealing himself as the manager of a debuting the Authors of Pain (Akam and Rezar), after their attack on American Alpha. On January 28, 2017, at NXT TakeOver: San Antonio, Ellering led Akam and Rezar to their first reign as NXT Tag Team Champions. On April 9, 2018, Paul Ellering made his debut on Monday Night Raw with Akam and Rezar as they answered an open challenge from Heath Slater and Rhyno. After they were victorious in their match, Akam and Rezar ended their partnership with Ellering by pushing him away and leaving him ringside as they returned backstage.

=== Second return to WWE (2023–2025) ===
On the December 29, 2023 episode of Smackdown, a vignette was shown of Karrion Kross and Scarlett, showing that they have aligned with the Authors of Pain and Paul Ellering, signalling their return to WWE in 2024.

On SmackDown: New Year's Revolution, Ellering, alongside the Authors of Pain, made their televised return, assisting Karrion Kross and Scarlett in attacking Bobby Lashley and the Street Profits, confirming their alliance in the process.

Ellering was released from his WWE contract after a combined total of fourteen years with the company for Ellering, along with the Authors of Pain on February 7, 2025.

== Personal life ==
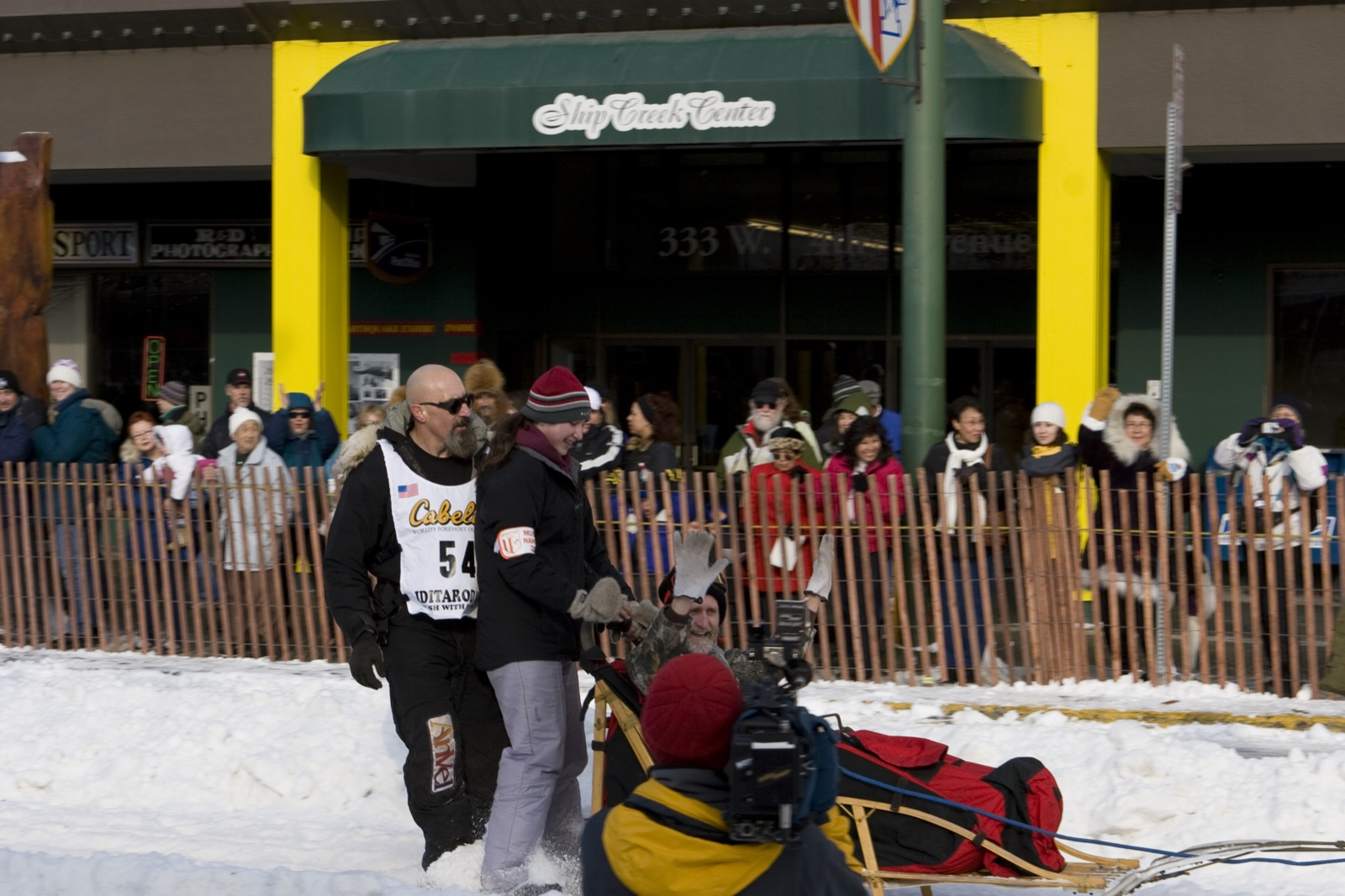
Ellering on Fourth Avenue in Anchorage during the ceremonial start of the 2006 Iditarod.

After retiring from professional wrestling, he traveled to Alaska to become a sled dog racer, participating in the Iditarod. In 2000 he came in 54th place.

In 2002, Ellering became the owner and operator of the Historic Rock Tavern on Big Birch Lake in Grey Eagle, Minnesota. In 2020, it was sold to new ownership after being on the market for three years. He has three children: Rebecca, Rachael and Saul. His daughter Rachael won the bronze medal at the 2014 World Powerlifting Championships. She made her professional wrestling debut in December 2015.

== Other media ==
Ellering made his video game debut as a non-playable character in WWE 2K18. He also appeared in WWE 2K25.

== Championships and accomplishments ==
- Cauliflower Alley Club
  - Tag Team Award (2020) – as part of the Road Warriors
- Continental Wrestling Association
  - AWA Southern Heavyweight Championship (1 time)
  - AWA Southern Tag Team Championship (1 time) – with Sheik Ali Hassan
- International Wrestling Enterprise (Japan)
  - IWA Tag Team Championship (1 time) – with Terry Latham
- National Wrestling Alliance
  - NWA Legends Hall of Heroes (2016)
- Professional Wrestling Hall of Fame and Museum
  - Class of 2011 (As a member of the Road Warriors)
- Pro Wrestling Illustrated
  - PWI Manager of the Year (1984)
- WWE
  - WWE Hall of Fame (Class of 2011) – as a member of the Road Warriors
