= The Undisputed Era =

Professional wrestling group

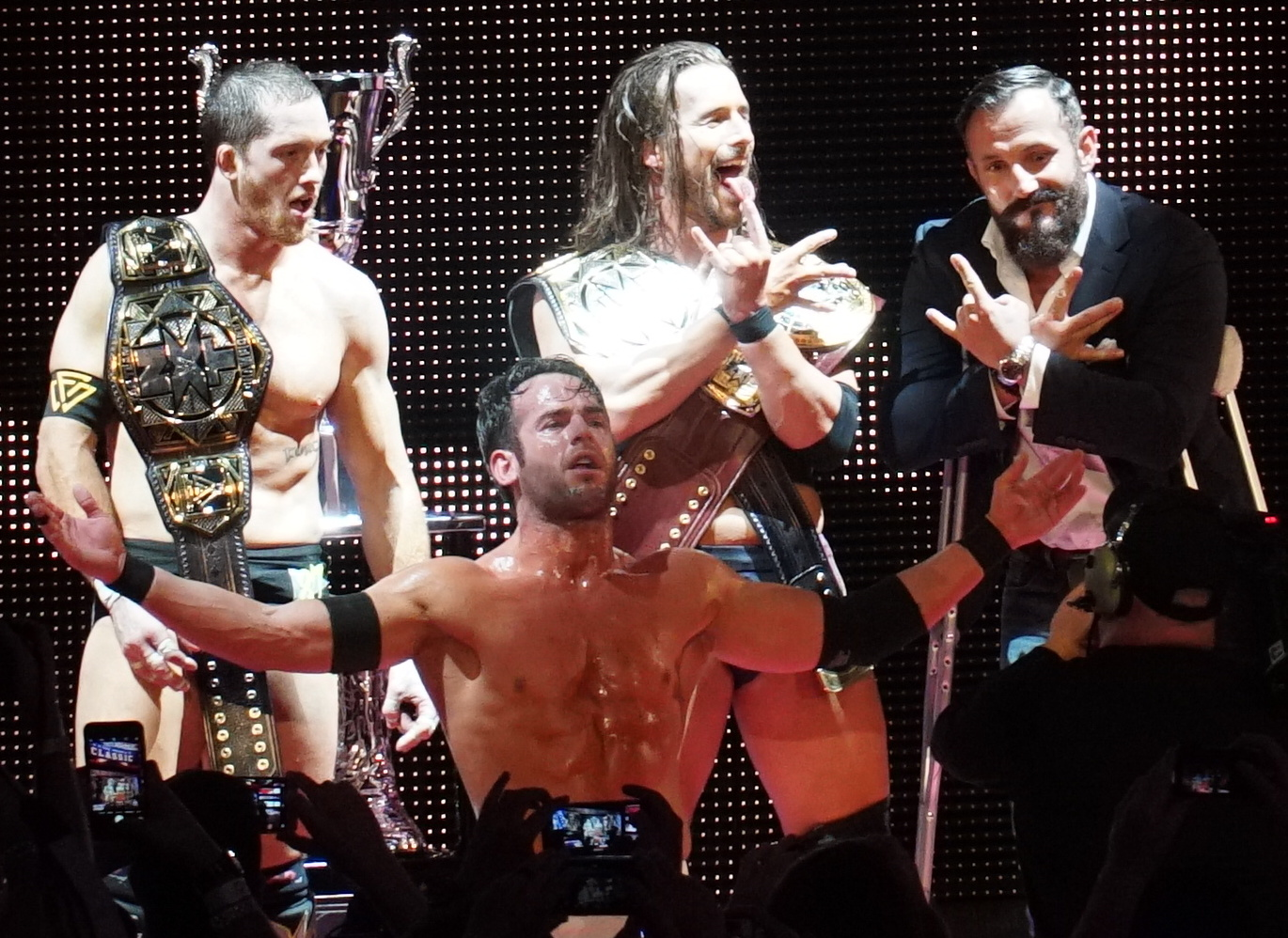
- The Undisputed Era in April 2018.

Stable
- Name: The Undisputed Era
- Leader: Adam Cole
- Members: Kyle O'Reilly; Roderick Strong; Bobby Fish
- Combined billed weight: 400 lb (180 kg)
- Debut: August 19, 2017
- Disbanded: March 24, 2021
- Years active: 2017–2021

The Undisputed Era was a professional wrestling stable consisting of leader Adam Cole with Kyle O'Reilly, Bobby Fish, and Roderick Strong. The group is widely known for their time in WWE's NXT brand. The stable is widely regarded as one of the greatest factions in WWE history.

The stable originated as the trio of Cole, Fish and O'Reilly on August 19, 2017 at NXT TakeOver: Brooklyn III, although Fish and O'Reilly had already been a tag team since 2012 under the name reDRagon. April 7, 2018 at NXT TakeOver: New Orleans marked a turning point for the Undisputed Era: during the event, Cole became the inaugural NXT North American Champion, he and O'Reilly won the 2018 Dusty Rhodes Tag Team Classic and successfully defended the NXT Tag Team Championship, and Strong joined the stable at the end of a lengthy feud against the three. As a quartet, they came to gain unprecedented dominance over NXT, with three NXT Tag Team Championship reigns, including one as four co-champions under the Freebird Rule, and Cole winning the NXT Championship, the brand's top title; from September 2019 to January 2020, The Undisputed Era simultaneously held all male titles on NXT, a feat never achieved before by any faction.

== Background ==
In 2010, Adam Cole and Kyle O'Reilly debuted in Ring of Honor as a tag team that would later be named "Future Shock", but the two split up in 2012 and began a longstanding rivalry against each other. In December 2012, O'Reilly formed a new tag team with Bobby Fish known as reDRagon, with the two winning the ROH World Tag Team Championship on three occasions, while Cole would form his own stable in 2014 known as The Kingdom. In the summer of 2015, reDRagon entered into a feud with The Kingdom, and began teaming with Cole after he seemingly had a falling out with his teammates and left the group. However, Cole's exit from The Kingdom was revealed to be a hoax when he attacked O'Reilly during his match for the ROH World Championship at All Star Extravaganza VII on September 18. Their reignited rivalry continued until January 2017, when O'Reilly left Ring of Honor to sign with WWE. Cole and Fish would follow suit, with Cole leaving in May and Fish in June. During their years in Ring of Honor, Cole, O'Reilly and Fish each had several matches against, and occasionally teaming with, fellow ROH wrestler Roderick Strong.

On July 12, 2017, episode of NXT, Fish made his NXT debut, losing to Aleister Black. On the August 2 episode of NXT, O'Reilly made his NXT debut, also losing to Black.

The Undisputed Era during their WWE run has been compared to D-Generation X and Evolution, both of which Triple H, the founder and producer of the NXT brand, was a member.

== History ==
=== WWE (2017–2021) ===
==== Formation and tag team success (2017–2019) ====
At NXT TakeOver: Brooklyn III on August 19, Fish and O'Reilly debuted as a team, attacking the newly crowned NXT Tag Team Champions, Sanity (Alexander Wolfe and Eric Young), as well as their opponents for the night, the Authors of Pain. Later that night, the two aligned themselves with Adam Cole and attacked newly crowned NXT Champion Drew McIntyre. The following month, the trio of Cole, Fish and O'Reilly was officially dubbed "The Undisputed Era".

On the October 11 episode of NXT, Taynara Conti interfered in a triple threat match between Nikki Cross, Peyton Royce and Liv Morgan on behalf of the Undisputed Era, preventing Cross of Sanity from winning. At NXT TakeOver: WarGames, the Undisputed Era defeated Sanity and The Authors of Pain and Roderick Strong in a WarGames match, the first of its kind in 20 years. On the December 20 episode of NXT, (taped on November 29), Fish and O'Reilly defeated Sanity (Eric Young and Killian Dain) to capture the NXT Tag Team Championship, marking their first title win in WWE. On the January 10, 2018, episode of NXT, Fish and O'Reilly were scheduled to defend their titles against Sanity in a rematch, but assaulted them backstage, rendering them unable to compete. Later that night, they were forced to defend their championships against Black and Strong by NXT general manager William Regal, and successfully retained their titles after Cole interfered and distracted Black. At NXT TakeOver: Philadelphia, the Undisputed Era defeated The Authors of Pain to retain the titles. On March 4, Fish suffered a torn ACL and MCL in his left knee at an NXT live event.

On April 7 at NXT TakeOver: New Orleans, Cole became the inaugural NXT North American Champion in a ladder match also involving EC3, Killian Dain, Lars Sullivan, Ricochet and Velveteen Dream. Later in the night, O'Reilly and Cole (in place of the injured Fish) successfully defended the NXT Tag Team Championships in the finals of the 2018 Dusty Rhodes Tag Team Classic against The Authors of Pain and Strong and Pete Dunne after Strong turned on Dunne to allow O'Reilly to pin him, joining the faction and turning heel in the process and allowing the group to win the tournament despite not being in it originally. With Strong joining the group, he was also recognized as part of the NXT Tag Team Champions via the "Freebird Rule". At NXT TakeOver: Chicago II, O'Reilly and Strong successfully defended the titles against Danny Burch and Oney Lorcan.

After developing a rivalry with British Strong Style (Dunne, Trent Seven and Tyler Bate), the two factions faced off on the first day of the WWE United Kingdom Championship Tournament event, where the Undisputed Era lost. On the second day of the event, O'Reilly and Strong lost the NXT Tag Team Championship to Seven and Bate. However, O'Reilly and Strong regained the titles just two days later (aired on tape delay on July 11). With the win, O'Reilly and Strong became just the second team in NXT history to win the titles more than once (the other being The Revival (Dash Wilder and Scott Dawson). At NXT TakeOver: Brooklyn 4, O'Reilly and Strong retained their titles against Bate and Seven. After the match, O'Reilly and Strong were attacked by the debuting War Raiders (Hanson and Rowe). On the same night, Cole lost the North American Championship to Ricochet.

On the August 29 episode of NXT, Cole and Strong defeated Ricochet and Dunne and attacked them along with O'Reilly after the match. However, the War Raiders came to the ring, chasing the Undisputed Era away. On the October 10 episode of NXT, Ricochet defeated Cole and Dunne in a triple threat match to retain the North American Championship. On the October 17 episode of NXT, O'Reilly and Strong retained the NXT Tag Team Championship against the War Raiders by disqualification after Fish returned from injury and attacked Hanson and Rowe. On the October 31 episode of NXT, Cole and Fish were scheduled to face the War Raiders. However, Hanson and Rowe attacked the Undisputed Era during a backstage promo. The brawl ended up in the ring, where the Undisputed Era got the upper-hand. Ricochet and Dunne entered on the War Raiders' behalf as the brawl progressed to even the odds. While the groups were fighting, general manager William Regal announced that the Undisputed Era would face the team of the War Raiders, Ricochet and Dunne in a WarGames match at NXT TakeOver: WarGames. At the event, the Undisputed Era were defeated after both Ricochet and Dunne pinned Cole. At NXT TakeOver: Phoenix, the Undisputed Era lost the NXT Tag Team Championships to The War Raiders.

==== Domination of NXT (2019–2021) ====
All four members competed at NXT TakeOver: XXV. Strong lost to Matt Riddle in the opening match. Fish and O'Reilly were unsuccessful in a four-way ladder match for the vacant NXT Tag Team Championship. In the event's main event, Cole defeated Johnny Gargano to win the NXT Championship. The win made Cole the second Triple Crown winner in NXT history (behind Gargano). On the August 15 tapings of NXT, O'Reilly and Fish defeated Street Profits (Angelo Dawkins and Montez Ford) for the NXT Tag Team Championships, making O'Reilly the first wrestler to become a three-time NXT Tag Team Champion. On September 18, 2019, during the debut episode of NXT on the USA Network, Roderick Strong defeated Velveteen Dream for the NXT North American Championship, marking Strong's first singles title in WWE, and making the Undisputed Era the first group to hold all male championships on the NXT brand; the WWE Cruiserweight Championship became the NXT Cruiserweight Championship on October 9, therefore elevating the number of male NXT titles to four.

In the build-up for the NXT and NXT UK co-branded pay-per-view, Worlds Collide, the Undisputed Era began feuding with Imperium (WWE United Kingdom Champion Walter, Alexander Wolfe, Fabian Aichner and Marcel Barthel), which was further intensified during the closing moments of NXT UK TakeOver: Blackpool II on January 12, 2020, where the group attacked Imperium following Walter's successful title defense against Joe Coffey. At Worlds Collide, Imperium defeated the Undisputed Era despite being outnumbered 4-3 after Wolfe suffered an injury early in the match. In the midst of their rivalry with Imperium, Strong lost the North American title to Keith Lee, while Fish and O'Reilly took part in the 2020 Dusty Rhodes Tag Team Classic, defeating NXT UK Tag Team Champions Gallus (Mark Coffey and Wolfgang) in the first round and losing to Grizzled Young Veterans (James Drake and Zack Gibson) in the semifinals thanks to a distraction from Imperium.

At NXT TakeOver: Portland, Cole successfully retained his title against Tommaso Ciampa after receiving assistance from the rest of the Undisputed Era and Johnny Gargano, who attacked Ciampa with the belt, turning heel in the process. However, Fish and O'Reilly lost the tag team titles to Dusty Rhodes Tag Team Classic winners The BroserWeights (Matt Riddle and Pete Dunne), leaving the Undisputed Era with only one title for the first time since August 2019. On the April 22 episode of NXT, Velveteen Dream and Dexter Lumis (replacing Keith Lee, who was attacked by Damian Priest before the match) defeated Cole and Strong in a tag team match, where Dream pinned Cole. This led to an NXT Championship match on the May 6 episode of NXT where Cole successfully retained his title against Dream and again at TakeOver: In Your House on June 7 in a last chance Backlot Brawl match, due to the stipulation at the event where if Dream lost he can no longer challenge for the NXT Championship again while Cole was still champion. Roderick Strong then entered a feud with Dexter Lumis. On the June 17 episode of NXT, Roderick Strong underwent therapy to get over his fear of Lumis. On the June 24 episode of NXT, Strong and Lumis faced each other but Lumis won via countout after Strong refused to fight Lumis.

On the July 1 episode of NXT: The Great American Bash night one, Strong faced Lumis in a strap match, but lost, thus ending their feud. The following week on July 8, which was night two of the event, Cole lost the NXT Championship to Keith Lee in a Winner Take All match, ending his historic reign at 403 days. Though Cole soon turned face after entering into a feud with Pat McAfee, Fish and Strong remained as heels. On the September 8 episode of NXT, Fish and Strong entered into a feud with Killian Dain, with Drake Maverick making the save and the Undisputed Era running off. On the September 16 episode of NXT, O'Reilly returned to NXT and turned face after saving Jake Atlas from a beatdown at the hands of Tommaso Ciampa. On the September 23 episode of NXT, O'Reilly won a gauntlet match earning him a title match against Finn Bálor at NXT TakeOver 31. Cole cemented his face turn on the September 30 episode of NXT after calling out Austin Theory, who had insulted O'Reilly earlier in the night during a backstage promo. At NXT: Takeover 31, O'Reilly lost to Bálor.

On October 21, Fish and Strong were mysteriously attacked before their tag team title match against Breezango and were replaced by Oney Lorcan and Danny Burch. It was revealed that Pat McAfee was behind the attacks, thus turning all the members of the Undisputed ERA into faces for the first time since the group's inception. At NXT Halloween Havoc, Kyle O' Reilly confronted McAfee, Burch and Lorcan. A returning Pete Dunne assisted Kyle O' Reilly. However, this partnership was short lived as Dunne hit O' Reilly with a steel chair turning heel in the process and aligning himself with McAfee, Lorcan, and Burch.

On the November 18 episode of NXT, the Undisputed Era made their return and brawled with Pat McAfee, Pete Dunne and The NXT Tag Team Champions, Oney Lorcan and Danny Burch. William Regal then announced that the two teams would face each other at NXT Takeover: WarGames. At NXT Takeover: WarGames, Undisputed Era defeated Team McAfee.

Kyle O' Reilly faced Pete Dunne on the December 16th episode of NXT where the winner would face Finn Bálor at NXT: New Year's Evil for the NXT Title. O' Reilly defeated Dunne and earned himself another opportunity at the NXT Title, in which he was unsuccessful. It was announced in late December 2020 that Adam Cole and Roderick Strong would be teaming up to represent the Undisputed Era in the 2021 annual Dusty Rhodes Tag Team classic. They defeated Breezango in the first round, but lost against the team of Ciampa and Timothy Thatcher in the quarter-finals.

==== Cole's betrayal and split (2021) ====
At NXT TakeOver: Vengeance Day, after saving Finn Bálor from a post match assault from Dunne, Lorcan, and Burch, Cole turned heel by superkicking Bálor and O'Reilly. On the March 24th edition of NXT, it was announced that the Undisputed Era had officially disbanded. Cole and O'Reilly fought each other in an Unsanctioned match at NXT TakeOver: Stand & Deliver, where O'Reilly was victorious. Cole defeated O'Reilly in a rematch at The Great American Bash. Cole and O'Reilly ended their feud in a 2-out-of-3 falls match at NXT Takeover: 36 in a match labeled "The Undisputed Finale", with O'Reilly defeating Cole. After a brief feud with Roderick Strong, Bobby Fish was released from his WWE contract and Adam Cole departed WWE. Both Fish and Cole joined All Elite Wrestling (AEW), with Kyle O'Reilly following suit in December. Roderick Strong would also join AEW in April 2023.

== Sub-groups ==
=== Former ===
| Affiliate | Members | Tenure | Type | Promotion(s) |
|---|---|---|---|---|
| Fish and O'Reilly | Bobby Fish; Kyle O'Reilly | 2017–2021 | Tag team | WWE |

== Championships and accomplishments ==
- CBS Sports
  - Feud of the Year (2019) – Cole vs. Johnny Gargano
  - Match of the Year (2019) – Cole vs. Johnny Gargano at NXT TakeOver: New York
  - Wrestler of the Year (2019) – Cole
- Pro Wrestling Illustrated
  - Feud of the Year (2019) – Cole vs. Johnny Gargano
  - Tag Team of the Year (2019) – Fish and O'Reilly
  - Wrestler of the Year (2019) – Cole
  - Ranked Cole No. 2 of the top 500 singles wrestlers in the PWI 500 in 2020
  - Ranked Strong No. 29 of the top 500 singles wrestlers in the PWI 500 in 2020
  - Ranked O'Reilly No. 38 of the top 500 singles wrestlers in the PWI 500 in 2017
  - Ranked Fish No. 53 of the top 500 singles wrestlers in the PWI 500 in 2017
  - Ranked No. 13 of the top 50 tag teams in the PWI Tag Team 50 in 2020
- Wrestling Observer Newsletter
  - Feud of the Year (2019) – Cole vs. Johnny Gargano
- WWE
  - NXT Championship (1 time) – Cole
  - NXT North American Championship (2 times) – Cole (1), Strong (1)
  - NXT Tag Team Championship (3 times) – Fish, O'Reilly, Cole and Strong (1)^{1}, O'Reilly and Strong (1), Fish and O'Reilly (1)
  - Dusty Rhodes Tag Team Classic (2018) – Cole and O'Reilly
  - Second NXT Triple Crown Champion – Cole
  - NXT Year-End Award (10 times)
    - Tag Team of the Year (2018) – O'Reilly and Strong
    - Tag Team of the Year (2019) – Fish and O'Reilly
    - Tag Team of the Year (2020) – Fish, O'Reilly, Cole and Strong
    - Male Competitor of the Year (2019, 2020) – Cole
    - Overall Competitor of the Year (2019) – Cole
    - Match of the Year (2019) – Cole vs. Johnny Gargano at NXT TakeOver: New York
    - Match of the Year (2020) – O'Reilly vs. Finn Bálor at NXT TakeOver: 31
    - Rivalry of the Year (2019) – Cole vs. Johnny Gargano
    - Rivalry of the Year (2020) – Cole vs. Pat McAfee

^{1}For the Undisputed Era's first reign, Fish and O'Reilly won the title as a duo, with Cole and Strong later being recognized as co-champions under the Freebird Rule.

== See also ==
- reDRagon
- The Kingdom (professional wrestling)
- The Elite (professional wrestling)
