= NXT TakeOver: Philadelphia =

2018 WWE Network event

- Promotional poster featuring various NXT wrestlers
- Promotion: WWE
- Brand: NXT
- Date: January 27, 2018
- City: Philadelphia, Pennsylvania
- Venue: Wells Fargo Center

WWE event chronology
← Previous; Clash of Champions	Next → Royal Rumble

NXT TakeOver chronology
← Previous; WarGames	Next → New Orleans

NXT TakeOver: Philadelphia was a 2018 professional wrestling livestreaming event produced by WWE, held exclusively for wrestlers from the promotion's developmental brand, NXT. It was the 18th NXT TakeOver event and took place on January 27, 2018, at the Wells Fargo Center in Philadelphia, Pennsylvania. It was held as part of that year's Royal Rumble weekend and aired exclusively on the WWE Network.

Five matches were contested at the event. In the main event, Andrade "Cien" Almas defeated Johnny Gargano to retain the NXT Championship. In other prominent matches, Ember Moon retained the NXT Women's Championship against Shayna Baszler, and Aleister Black defeated Adam Cole in an Extreme Rules match. The event was also notable for the return of Tommaso Ciampa.

== Production ==
=== Background ===
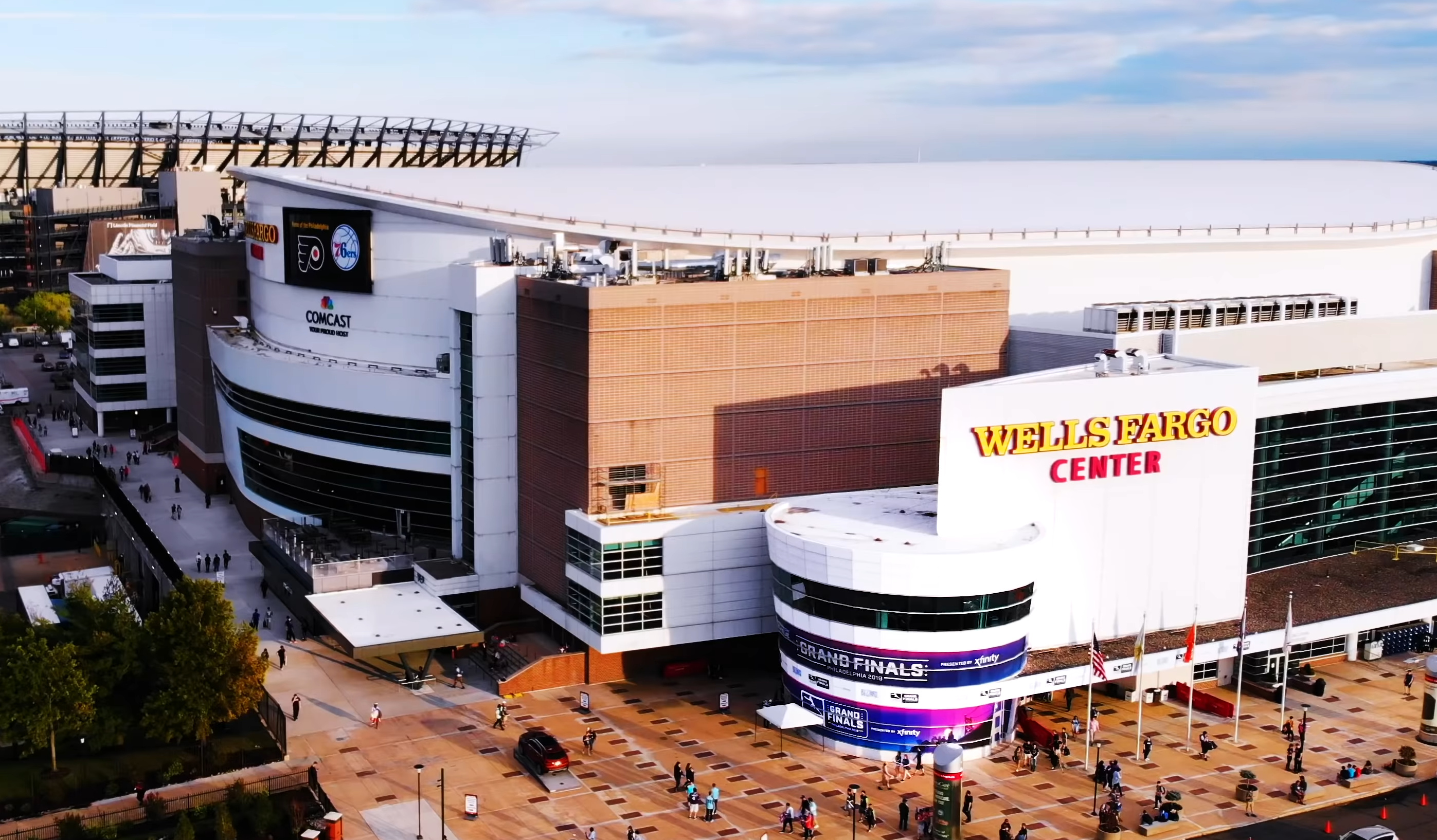
The 18th NXT TakeOver event was held at the Wells Fargo Center in Philadelphia, Pennsylvania.

TakeOver was a series of professional wrestling events that began in May 2014, as WWE's developmental brand, NXT, held its second WWE Network-exclusive livestreaming event, billed as TakeOver. The "TakeOver" moniker subsequently became the branding for all of NXT's major events held periodically throughout the year. Announced on January 26, 2017, TakeOver: Philadelphia was scheduled as the 18th TakeOver event and was held on Saturday, January 27, 2018, as a support show for that year's Royal Rumble for the main roster. It was held at the Wells Fargo Center, the same venue as the Royal Rumble, and was named after the venue's city of Philadelphia, Pennsylvania. Tickets went on sale on December 1, 2017. The theme songs for the event were "When the Lights Come On" and "Into The Fire" by Asking Alexandria.

=== Storylines ===
The card included matches that resulted from scripted storylines. Results were predetermined by WWE's writers on the NXT brand, while storylines were produced on WWE's weekly television program, NXT.

On the December 6 episode of NXT, NXT General Manager William Regal announced that a series of matches which included Kassius Ohno vs. Johnny Gargano (the latter replaced The Velveteen Dream), Aleister Black vs. Adam Cole, Killian Dain vs. Trent Seven, and Roderick Strong vs. Lars Sullivan took place to have the winners of these four matches go into a fatal four-way match to determine the number one contender for the NXT Championship. The winners were Gargano, Black, Dain, and Sullivan, who then fought in the aforementioned fatal four-way match on the December 27 episode of NXT, which Gargano won after Black was distracted by The Undisputed Era, granting him a match with NXT Champion Andrade "Cien" Almas at TakeOver: Philadelphia.

On the December 6 episode of NXT, Aleister Black defeated Adam Cole to earn a spot in the fatal-four way number one contender's match. On the December 27 episode, The Undisputed Era cost Black an opportunity at the NXT Championship in the aforementioned fatal four-way match. On the January 10 episode, Black teamed with Roderick Strong to challenge Bobby Fish and Kyle O'Reilly for their NXT Tag Team Championship, but was unsuccessful after Cole interfered and lured Black into the crowd. After the match, The Undisputed Era attacked Black. NXT General Manager William Regal then came out and announced an Extreme Rules match between Black and Cole at TakeOver: Philadelphia.

On the January 10 episode of NXT, Shayna Baszler made her NXT in-ring debut against Dakota Kai, which ended in a referee stoppage after Baszler injured Kai's arm. After the match, Baszler continued to attack Kai while the medical staff were tending to the injury, causing NXT Women's Champion Ember Moon to rush to the aid of Kai to stop the attack. On the January 17 episode, after losing a match to Lacey Evans, Aliyah was attacked by Baszler, causing Moon to rush to stop Baszler's attack again. After this attack, Moon challenged Baszler to a match to end her bullying tactics. Baszler refused unless the NXT Women's Championship was on the line at TakeOver: Philadelphia. Moon accepted, and the title match was made official by NXT General Manager William Regal.

During a January 24 conference call promoting TakeOver, Triple H confirmed that a matchup between Velveteen Dream and Kassius Ohno would take place at TakeOver: Philadelphia.

== Event ==
Other on-screen personnel
Role:	Name:
Commentators	Mauro Ranallo
Commentators	Percy Watson
Ring announcer	Mike Rome
Referees	Tom Castor
Referees	Drake Wuertz
Referees	Eddie Orengo
Referees	Darryl Sharma
Pre-show panel	Charly Caruso
Pre-show panel	Sam Roberts
Pre-show panel	Samoa Joe

=== Preliminary matches ===
The event opened with The Undisputed Era (Bobby Fish and Kyle O'Reilly) defending the NXT Tag Team Championship against The Authors of Pain (Akam and Rezar). After Akam collided with Rezar, O'Reilly pinned Akam with a roll up to retain the titles.

Next, The Velveteen Dream faced Kassius Ohno. Near the end of the match, Ohno hit Dream with a ripcord rolling elbow for a near fall. Ohno went for another Rolling Elbow, but Dream countered it with a Death Valley driver, and followed it up with the "Purple Rainmaker" from the top of the ring post for the win.

After that, Ember Moon defended the NXT Women's Championship against Shayna Baszler. As Baszler applied a cross armbreaker, Moon countered into a pin to retain the title. After the match, Baszler attacked Moon and applied the "Kirifuda Clutch" on Moon, who passed out.

In the fourth match, Aleister Black faced Adam Cole in an Extreme Rules match. Cole performed a superkick into a chair on Black, who fell through two tables outside the ring, and scored a near-fall. Black performed a Death Valley driver on Cole onto two chairs. The Undisputed Era (Kyle O’Reilly and Bobby Fish) interfered and performed "Total Elimination" on Black. SAnitY (Eric Young, Alexander Wolfe and Killian Dain) appeared and attacked Fish and O’Reilly, with Dain performing a suicide dive on Fish, O’Reilly, Young and Wolfe. Black performed a double knees on Cole through the announce table. Black performed "Black Mass" on Cole for the win.

=== Main event ===
In the main event, Andrade "Cien" Almas, accompanied by Zelina Vega, defended the NXT Championship against Johnny Gargano. Gargano performed a slingshot DDT on Almas onto the ring apron for a near-fall. Gargano performed a superkick on Almas for a near-fall. Almas performed a double knee smash on Gargano, who was seated in the corner, for a near-fall. Gargano applied the "Garga-No-Escape", but Almas escaped. Whilst the referee was distracted, Vega attacked Gargano with a hurricanrana off the ring apron into the steel steps. Almas performed a hammerlock DDT on Gargano for a near-fall. Candice LeRae (Gargano's wife, who was seated in the front row) attacked Vega and chased Vega out of the arena. Gargano performed another slingshot DDT on Almas for a near-fall. Gargano applied the "Garga-No Escape", but Almas placed his foot on the bottom rope. Almas performed a double knee smash on Gargano, who was seated against the ring post. Almas performed an elevated hammerlock DDT on Gargano to retain the title. After the match, as Gargano and LeRae left, Tommaso Ciampa made his return from injury and attacked Gargano with a crutch as the event ended.

== Reception ==
The match between Johnny Gargano and Andrade "Cien" Almas received widespread acclaim, being rated five stars by Wrestling Observer Newsletter journalist Dave Meltzer.

== Results ==
No.	Results	Stipulations	Times
1^{N}	Nikki Cross defeated Lacey Evans by pinfall	Singles match	2:28
2^{N}	TM-61 (Nick Miller and Shane Thorne) defeated The Ealy Brothers (Gabriel and Uriel Ealy) by pinfall	Tag team match	3:17
3^{N}	Roderick Strong defeated Tyler Bate by pinfall	Singles match to determine the #1 contender to the WWE United Kingdom Championship	8:32
4	The Undisputed Era (Bobby Fish and Kyle O'Reilly) (c) defeated The Authors of Pain (Akam and Rezar) (with Paul Ellering) by pinfall	Tag team match for the NXT Tag Team Championship	14:50
5	Velveteen Dream defeated Kassius Ohno by pinfall	Singles match	10:45
6	Ember Moon (c) defeated Shayna Baszler by pinfall	Singles match for the NXT Women's Championship	10:06
7	Aleister Black defeated Adam Cole by pinfall	Extreme Rules match	22:02
8	Andrade "Cien" Almas (c) (with Zelina Vega) defeated Johnny Gargano by pinfall	Singles match for the NXT Championship	32:19
(c) / – the champion(s) heading into the match; N / – the match was taped for a future broadcast of NXT
