= Sanity (professional wrestling) =

Professional wrestling stable

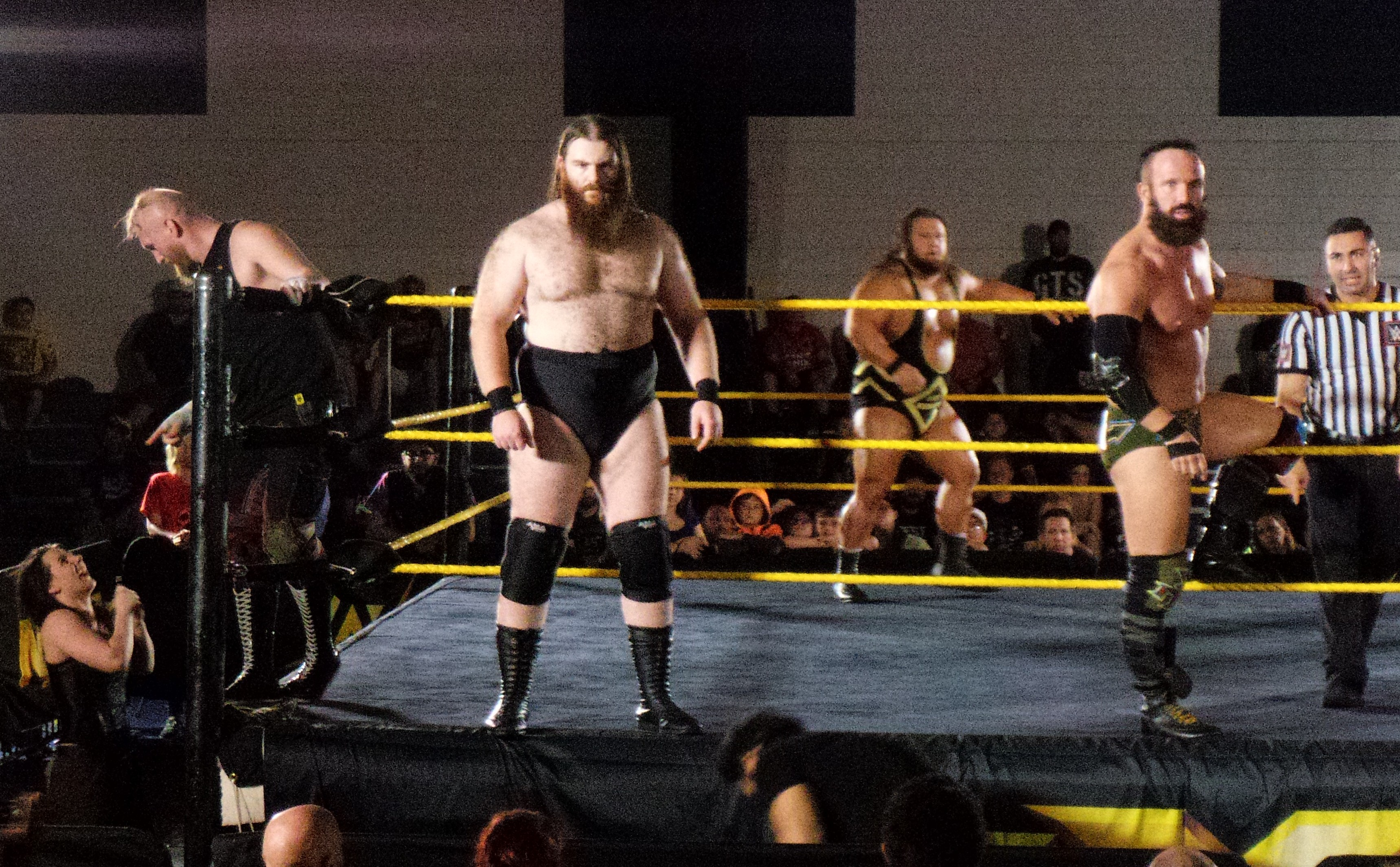
- SAnitY in 2017. In front of the ropes: Eric Young (right) and Killian Dain (left), with Alexander Wolfe on the left talking to Nikki Cross outside the ring

Stable
- Leader: Eric Young
- Members: Alexander Wolfe; Sawyer Fulton; Nikki Cross; Killian Dain
- Debut: October 12, 2016
- Disbanded: April 15, 2019
- Years active: 2016–2019; 2022

Sanity (stylized as SAni†Y or SAnitY) was a professional wrestling stable best known for their time in WWE. The stable consisted of leader Eric Young, Alexander Wolfe, Sawyer Fulton, Nikki Cross, and Killian Dain.

The stable originated on October 12, 2016, originally composed of Young, Wolfe, Fulton, and Cross. After Fulton suffered an injury the following month, eventually getting released from WWE, he was replaced by Dain on January 18, 2017. Young and Wolfe are former NXT Tag Team Champions, having won the titles at NXT TakeOver: Brooklyn III by defeating the Authors of Pain. On April 17, 2018, as Sanity was called up to SmackDown during the 2018 WWE Superstar Shake-up, it was revealed that Cross would be staying on NXT as a singles competitor, thus splitting her from the group. Dain revealed during a Q&A that Cross would remain a member of Sanity despite the separation. On April 15, 2019, Young was drafted to Raw during 2019 WWE Superstar Shake-up thus ending the group. However, Young and Wolfe (now known under his real name, Axel Tischer) made one sporadic reunion as a tag team in 2022.

== History ==
=== Origins ===
According to original member Sawyer Fulton, Sanity's concept came from Triple H, who was inspired by the film Smokin' Aces, "long before 2016". It was originally pitched to Fulton, Solomon Crowe, and Marcus Louis, but this incarnation never came to be, as, according to Fulton: "we tried a few things but it did not fit. Then [Crowe] left the company and Marcus was fired, so I was alone again."

=== NXT (2016–2018) ===
The concept was brought back after Fulton was randomly paired up with Alexander Wolfe in a match against the Hype Bros at a live event, as the two enjoyed working with each other. After a series of cryptic vignettes teasing the stable, it was announced on October 4, 2016, that "Sanity" would be part of the second annual Dusty Rhodes Tag Team Classic tournament, although the nature of the group and the identity of its members remained anonymous. In the first round of the tournament on the October 12 episode of NXT, the stable made their debut, appearing as four hooded individuals. Wolfe and Fulton were the first to unmask, and faced the team of Tye Dillinger and Bobby Roode, winning their first round match after Roode walked out on his partner. After the match, Eric Young and Nikki Cross revealed themselves as the last two members of the stable; it was Young's debut as an NXT wrestler, although he had previously faced Samoa Joe on May 4 while not under contract.

The following week on the October 19 episode of NXT, Cross made her in-ring debut against Danielle Kamela; she originally won the match, but continued to assault Kamela afterwards, forcing the referee to reverse his decision. Wolfe and Fulton went on to defeat T. J. Perkins and Kota Ibushi in the second round of the tournament on November 2, but were eliminated by TM61 in the semi-finals on November 9.

Shortly after the tournament, Fulton suffered a torn pectoral. He was subsequently written off. On November 30, after Sanity teased that Fulton was no longer associated with the group after Young stomped on Fulton's jacket before kicking it out of the ring, Damo was teased as a potential new member of Sanity by attacking No Way Jose but he threw away Fulton's jacket. On January 18, right after Tye Dillinger refused to join Sanity, Damo, now using the name Killian Dain, officially joined the group by attacking Dillinger and accepting Fulton's jacket. Fulton never re-appeared on television, and was ultimately released by WWE on November 3, 2017. He later praised Dain as his replacement, calling him "a great person and great fighter."

At NXT TakeOver: San Antonio, Young defeated Dillinger, while Cross was unsuccessful in capturing the NXT Women's Championship in a Fatal 4-Way match won by defending champion Asuka. Dillinger continued his feud with Sanity, gaining new allies with No Way Jose, Roderick Strong, and the debuting Ruby Riott. The eight-people feud culminated at NXT TakeOver: Orlando, where Sanity defeated Dillinger, Strong, Riott and Kassius Ohno (a replacement for Jose, who was attacked earlier in the night by Sanity). Sanity's feud with Dillinger ended on the April 19, 2017 episode of NXT, when Dillinger, who had recently been drafted to SmackDown, had his last NXT match, he defeated Young in a steel cage match. At NXT TakeOver: Chicago, Young suffered his first pinfall defeat to Roderick Strong whilst Nikki Cross once again failed to win the women's title in a triple threat match against Asuka and Riott.

After a series of confrontations between Sanity and the NXT Tag Team Champions Authors of Pain throughout July, it was announced on August 2, that Dain and Wolfe would face the champions for the title at NXT TakeOver: Brooklyn III. At the event, Wolfe started the match, but instead of tagging Dain in, tagged Young, effectively making him his partner; Wolfe and Young defeated The Authors of Pain, becoming NXT Tag Team Champions. Following the celebration, they were attacked by Bobby Fish and Kyle O'Reilly, who formed the new stable The Undisputed Era with Adam Cole later the same night. Dain subsequently also defended the titles under the Freebird Rule, but was not recognised as champion.

On the September 20 episode of NXT, Sanity helped Drew McIntyre against The Undisputed Era, thus turning the stable face in the process. At NXT TakeOver: WarGames, Young, Wolfe and Dain faced The Undisputed Era and the team of The Authors of Pain and Roderick Strong in a WarGames match, the first one in 20 years, but ultimately lost when Young was pinned by Cole.

On the December 20 episode of NXT, Young and Dain lost the NXT Tag Team Championship to Fish and O'Reilly. At NXT TakeOver: New Orleans on April 7, 2018, Dain unsuccessfully competed in a six-man ladder match to determine the inaugural NXT North American Champion against EC3, Lars Sullivan, Ricochet, Velveteen Dream and eventual winner Adam Cole.

=== Move to main roster and break-up (2018–2019) ===
On the April 17, 2018 episode of SmackDown Live, a vignette aired to promote Sanity's debut as part of the 2018 WWE Superstar Shake-up. Later in the night it was revealed that Cross would be staying on NXT as a singles competitor. On June 19, Sanity made their debut on SmackDown Live beating down The Usos prior to their scheduled tag match, turning back to heels. At Extreme Rules, Sanity defeated The New Day in a six-man tag team tables match. Following that win, the stable was nearly completely absent from television for the remainder of the year (though they did make an appearance on an episode of SmackDown from Manchester, England, where Cross temporarily rejoined them in making her main-roster debut answering an open challenge from SmackDown Women's Champion Becky Lynch). On the April 2, 2019 episode of SmackDown Live, all three members of Sanity were defeated by The Miz in a handicap falls count anywhere match. A WWE.com article blamed their lack of success on SmackDown on being "in the same division as The New Day, The Bar, The Usos and The Bludgeon Brothers."

The team disbanded in April 2019 when Young was drafted to Raw via the Superstar Shake-up. Dain praised Young and Wolfe as well as the group's tenure in a social media post the following day. Dain returned to NXT at a live event on May 16. Wolfe appeared on the June 12, 2019 episode of NXT UK, where he joined the Imperium stable. Young competed primarily on Main Event while sporadically being on Raw.

On April 15, 2020, Young was released from his contract due to budget cuts as a result of the COVID-19 pandemic. On May 19, 2021, Wolfe was released from his contract. The following month on June 25, Dain was released from his contract. Fightful Select reported on April 10, 2023, that Young had re-signed with the WWE on November 1, 2022, but never appeared on television before being released again per his own request. Cross would employ multiple gimmicks before joining The Wyatt Sicks stable in 2024, and was finally released in 2026.

=== Independent circuit (2022) ===
On October 8, 2022, Eric Young and Axel Tischer reunited as Sanity to compete in Westside Xtreme Wrestling's wXw World Tag Team Festival.

== Championships and accomplishments ==
- BODYSLAM Pro Wrestling
  - BODYSLAM Tag Team Championship (1 time) – Tischer and Damo
- Catch Factory
  - Catch Factory Championship (1 time) – Tischer
- German Wrestling Federation
  - GWF World Championship (1 time) – Tischer
- Insane Championship Wrestling
  - ICW Tag Team Championship (1 time) – Tischer and Damo
- Progress Wrestling
  - Progress Atlas Championship (1 time) – Tischer
  - PROGRESS Tag Team Championship (1 time) – Tischer and Damo
- Pro Wrestling Österreich
  - PWÖ Tag Team Championship (1 time) – Tischer and Damo
- Over The Top Wrestling
  - OTT World Championship (1 time) – Damo
- WrestlingKULT
  - King of Kult (2025) – Tischer
- WWE
  - NXT Tag Team Championship (1 time) – Wolfe and Young^{1}
  - NXT Year-End Award (1 time)
    - Tag Team of the Year (2017) – Wolfe, Dain, and Young

^{1} Dain also defended the title under the Freebird Rule, but was not recognized as champion.
