= NXT TakeOver: New Orleans =

2018 WWE Network event

- Promotional poster featuring various NXT wrestlers
- Promotion: WWE
- Brand: NXT
- Date: April 7, 2018
- City: New Orleans, Louisiana
- Venue: Smoothie King Center
- Attendance: 13,955

WWE event chronology
← Previous; Fastlane	Next → WrestleMania 34

NXT TakeOver chronology
← Previous; Philadelphia	Next → Chicago II

NXT TakeOver: New Orleans was a 2018 professional wrestling livestreaming event produced by WWE, held exclusively for wrestlers from the promotion's developmental brand, NXT. It was the 19th NXT TakeOver event and took place on April 7, 2018, at the Smoothie King Center in New Orleans, Louisiana. It was held as part of the WrestleMania 34 weekend festivities and aired exclusively on the WWE Network.

Five matches were contested at the event. In the main event, Johnny Gargano defeated Tommaso Ciampa in an unsanctioned match and was reinstated to NXT. On the undercard, Aleister Black defeated Andrade "Cien" Almas to win the NXT Championship, Shayna Baszler defeated Ember Moon to capture the NXT Women's Championship, and Adam Cole won a six-man ladder match to become the inaugural NXT North American Champion.

The event received universal acclaim from wrestling fans and critics and both the NXT North American Championship match and the Unsanctioned match between Gargano and Ciampa both received five-star ratings by wrestling journalist Dave Meltzer. It was the first time Meltzer gave five stars to two matches on the same North American show. It has since been described as one of the greatest wrestling shows of all time.

== Production ==
=== Background ===
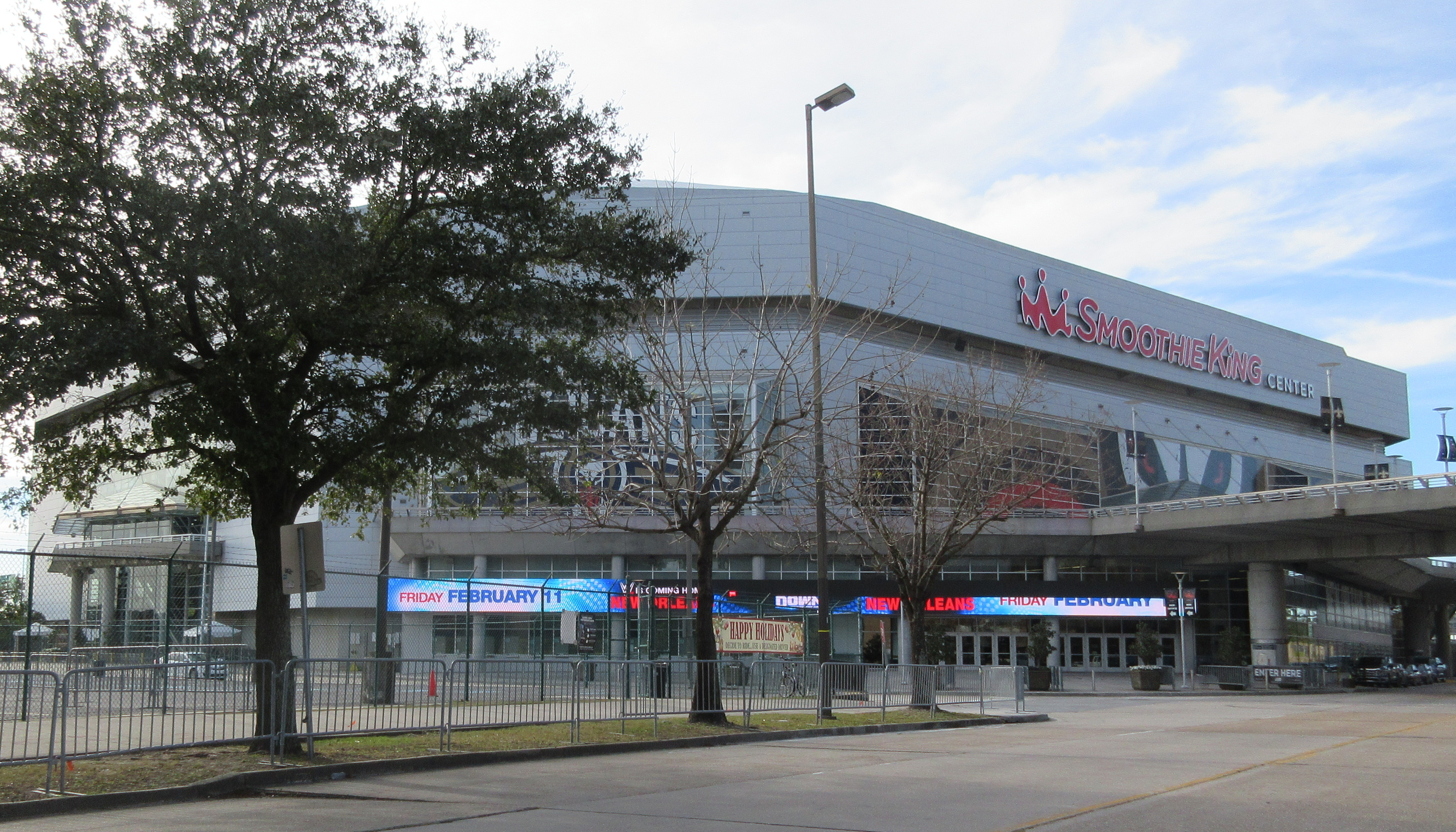
The 19th NXT TakeOver event was held at the Smoothie King Center in New Orleans, Louisiana.

TakeOver was a series of professional wrestling events that began in May 2014, as WWE's developmental brand, NXT, held its second WWE Network-exclusive livestreaming event, billed as TakeOver. The "TakeOver" moniker subsequently became the branding for all of NXT's major events held periodically throughout the year. Announced on December 4, 2017, TakeOver: New Orleans was scheduled as the 19th TakeOver event and was held on Saturday, April 7, 2018, as a support show for WrestleMania 34 for the main roster. It was held at the Smoothie King Center and was named after the venue's city of New Orleans, Louisiana. Tickets went on sale on December 15, 2017.

This was the first TakeOver event to feature Spanish play-by-play commentary live from ringside, as Spanish color commentator Marcelo Rodriguez announced via Twitter. Former Indianapolis Colts punter and Barstool Sports personality Pat McAfee was also announced to join the Pre-Show panel.

=== Storylines ===
The event comprised five matches that resulted from scripted storylines. Results were predetermined by WWE's writers on the NXT brand, while storylines were produced on WWE's weekly television program, NXT.

On the February 28 episode of NXT, Andrade Cien Almas and Zelina Vega boasted about their victory over Johnny Gargano. Then Aleister Black and Killian Dain came out and the three brawled. The following week, Black defeated Dain to become the number one contender to the NXT Championship and would face Almas at TakeOver: New Orleans.

At TakeOver: Philadelphia, Ember Moon defeated Shayna Baszler to retain the NXT Women's Championship. After the match, Baszler attacked Moon. On the February 7 episode of NXT, Baszler stated that Moon was afraid of her. Later, a tweet from Moon was shown challenging Baszler to a rematch from TakeOver: Philadelphia for the title for the following week. The following week, the rematch ended in a disqualification when Kairi Sane attacked Baszler, thus allowing Moon to retain. Two weeks later, after defeating Sane, Baszler called out Moon. On the March 14 episode, after a match that saw Dakota Kai defeat Lacey Evans, Baszler came down and attacked Kai. Moon came out and then proceeded to brawl with Baszler, which saw Moon stand tall after an Eclipse. The following week after Moon defeated Aliyah, Baszler and Moon argued back and forth.

On the February 21 episode of NXT, NXT General Manager William Regal announced that there would be a Dusty Rhodes Tag Team Classic and the winner would receive a shot at NXT Tag Team Championship at Takeover: New Orleans. The tournament began on the March 7 episode of NXT. Over the next couple of weeks, Authors of Pain, Sanity, Street Profits and Pete Dunne and Roderick Strong, who replaced the previously announced Tyler Bate and Trent Seven after Bate suffered a knee injury, advanced to the next round by defeating TM-61, Riddick Moss and Tino Sabbatelli, Heavy Machinery and Danny Burch and Oney Lorcan, respectively. The semifinal saw The Authors of Pain and Dunne and Strong advance to the finals by defeating Street Profits and Sanity, respectively. The finals featured The Authors of Pain face the team of Strong and Dunne, which ended in a no contest when The Undisputed ERA interfered. Regal then scheduled a triple threat tag team match for the tag team titles and the Dusty Classic trophy at TakeOver: New Orleans.

On the March 28 episode of NXT, NXT General Manager William Regal announced the introduction of the new NXT North American Championship. He was interrupted by EC3, who was making his return to WWE after previously appearing under the ring name Derrick Bateman. EC3 was subsequently announced by Regal as one of six wrestlers who would compete in a ladder match at TakeOver: New Orleans to crown the inaugural champion. Later that night, Regal also announced the other five participants as Adam Cole, Velveteen Dream, Lars Sullivan, Killian Dain, and the debuting Ricochet.

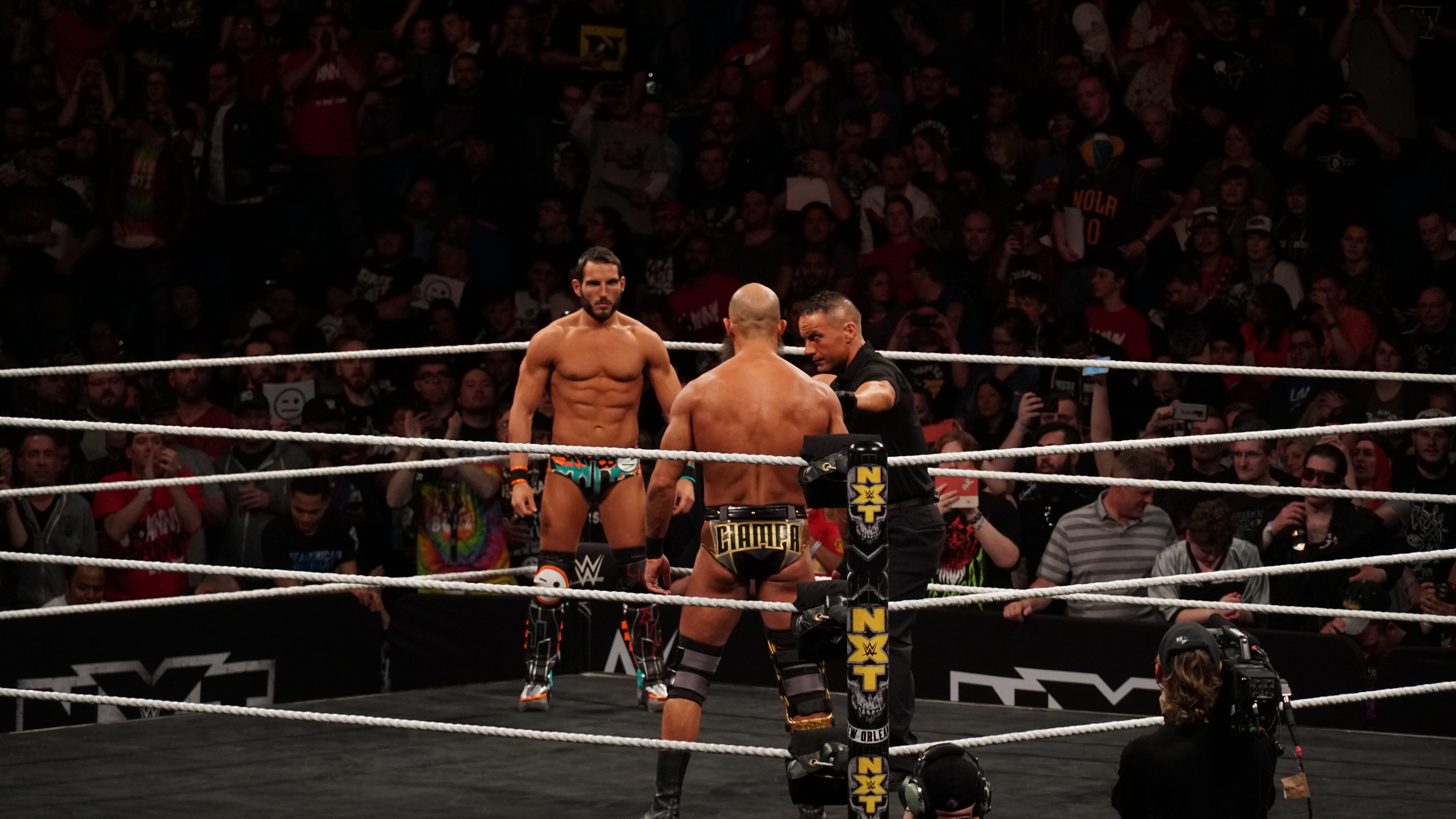
The event saw the culmination of a year-long rivalry between Johnny Gargano and Tommaso Ciampa

At TakeOver: Chicago in May 2017, Johnny Gargano and Tommaso Ciampa, then teaming together in #DIY, were defeated by The Authors of Pain in a ladder match, failing to win back the NXT Tag Team Championship. After the match, Gargano and Ciampa stood on the stage, expressing sadness of defeat. Ciampa then turned on Gargano, attacking him and putting him through two tables. Ciampa explained his attack by revealing that he had sustained an ACL injury and would be out for several months, during which time he suspected that Gargano would try to replace him in their team. At TakeOver: Philadelphia, Gargano was defeated by Andrade "Cien" Almas to retain the NXT Championship. After the match, with Gargano leaving up the ramp, Ciampa made his first appearance since the betrayal by attacking Gargano with a crutch. Gargano subsequently put his NXT career on the line for another title shot against Almas, only to lose after interference from Ciampa, costing Gargano his NXT contract. Over the next few weeks, Gargano developed an obsession for getting back at Ciampa, going as far as ambushing him outside the WWE Performance Center and attempting to break into his house. An unsanctioned match (due to Gargano no longer being contracted to NXT) between the two was made official on the March 28 episode of NXT, with the added stipulation of Gargano being restored to NXT if he won.

== Event ==
Other on-screen personnel
Role:	Name:
English commentators	Mauro Ranallo
English commentators	Nigel McGuinness
English commentators	Percy Watson
Spanish commentators	Carlos Cabrera
Spanish commentators	Marcelo Rodríguez
Ring announcer	Mike Rome
Referees	Tom Castor
Referees	Drake Wuertz
Referees	Eddie Orengo
Referees	Darryl Sharma
Pre-show panel	Charly Caruso
Pre-show panel	Sam Roberts
Pre-show panel	Pat McAfee

=== Preliminary matches ===
The event opened with a musical performance from Cane Hill. The first match on the card was a ladder match for the NXT North American Championship involving EC3, Ricochet, Adam Cole, Velveteen Dream, Lars Sullivan and Killian Dain. In the end, Ricochet attempted to retrieve the title but Cole pushed the ladder, causing Ricochet to fall. Cole retrieved the title to win the match.

Next, Ember Moon defended the NXT Women's Championship against Shayna Baszler. Moon went for the "Eclipse", but Baszler countered and applied the "Kirifuda Clutch" on Moon, who passed out. As a result, Baszler won the title by technical submission.

After that, the Dusty Rhodes Tag Team Classic tournament finals took place with The Undisputed Era (Adam Cole and Kyle O'Reilly) defending the NXT Tag Team Championship against The Authors of Pain (Akam and Rezar) and Roderick Strong and WWE United Kingdom Champion Pete Dunne. Dunne performed the "Bitter End" on O’Reilly, but Strong attacked Dunne, voiding the pinfall at a two count. Strong performed "End of Heartache" on Dunne and placed O'Reilly on top of Dunne, thus The Undisputed Era retained the titles and won the tournament in the process. After the match, Strong put on Cole's Undisputed Era armband, turning heel and joining and celebrating with the group.

In the penultimate match, Andrade Cien Almas, accompanied by Zelina Vega, defended the NXT Championship against Aleister Black. Whilst the referee was distracted, Vega performed a hurricanrana off the ring apron into the steel steps on Black; Almas subsequently scored a near-fall. Black performed the "Black Mass" on Almas, but Vega placed Almas’ foot on the bottom rope, voiding the pinfall at a two count. Almas performed a double knee smash on Black, who was seated in the corner, for a near-fall. Almas performed another double knee smash on Black, who was seated against the ring post, and attempted an elevated hammerlock DDT, but Black countered and performed a topé con hilo on the outside. Almas performed a hammerlock DDT on Black for a near-fall. Vega dove off the top rope, though Black ducked, and Almas caught Vega, allowing Black to perform the "Black Mass" on Almas to win the title.

=== Main event ===
In the main event, Johnny Gargano faced Tommaso Ciampa in an unsanctioned match. Ciampa performed a suplex on Gargano off the announce table. Gargano performed a powerbomb on Ciampa off the ring apron onto the exposed concrete. Gargano struck Ciampa with a crutch and performed a slingshot DDT on Ciampa for a near-fall. Gargano applied the "Garga-No-Escape", only for Ciampa to rake Gargano's eyes. Ciampa performed a "Project Ciampa" on Gargano for a near-fall. Gargano performed a "Lawn Dart" into an exposed turnbuckle and two superkicks on Ciampa, who was kneeling, for a near-fall. Ciampa then performed a "Project Ciampa" from the second rope on Gargano for a near-fall. In the end, Ciampa attempted to strike Gargano with his knee brace, however Gargano countered and applied the "Garga-No-Escape", transitioning into an STF using the knee brace. Ciampa submitted, thus Gargano won and was reinstated in NXT.

== Reception ==
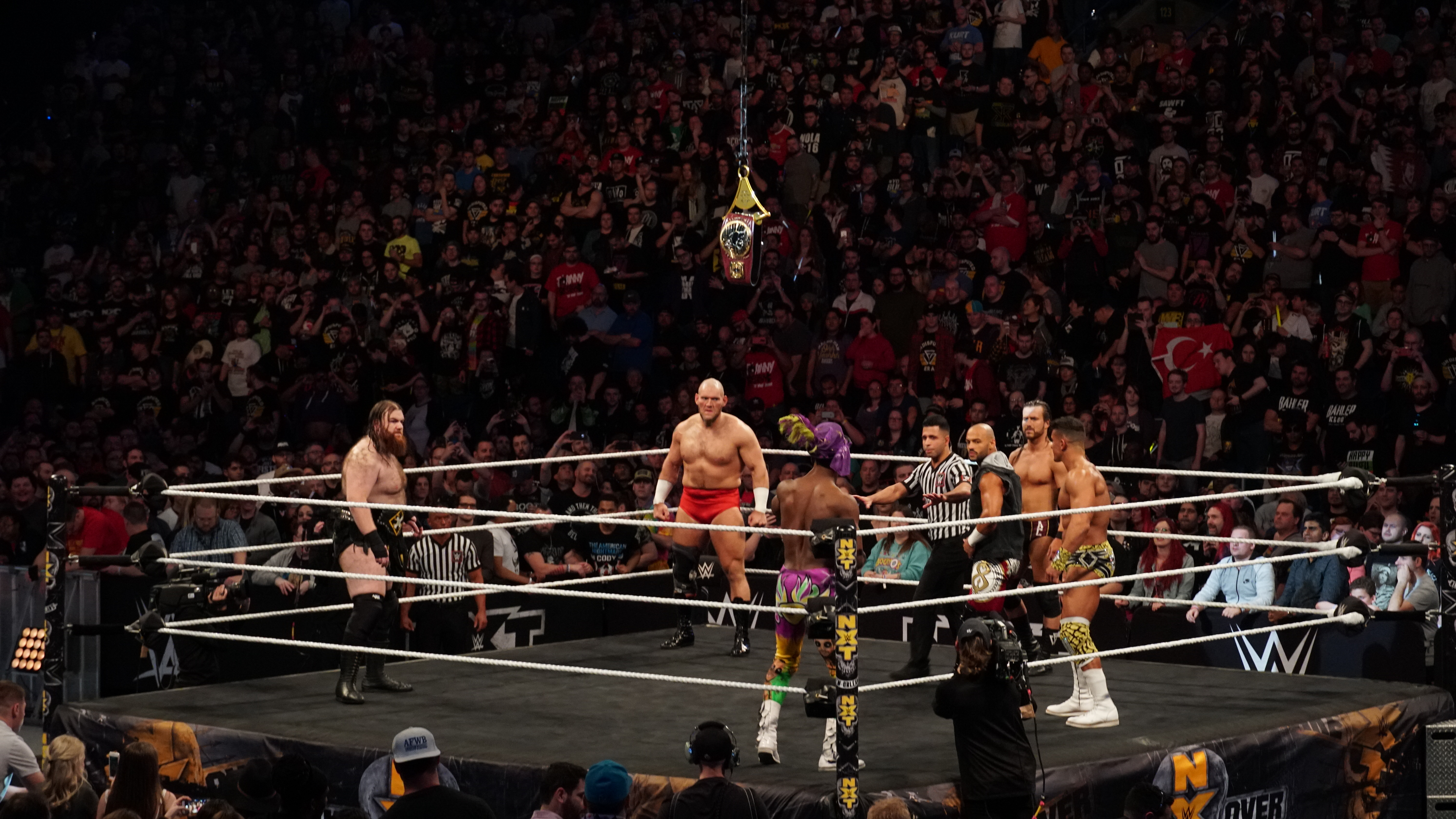
The six competitors in the ring for the ladder match for the NXT North American Championship. The match received critical acclaim and a five-star rating from Dave Meltzer

The event received universal acclaim from fans and critics. Gene Guillot of The Times-Picayune described the show as "wrestling at its finest", involving "spectacular wrestling and incredible story telling" with "moment after moment of high impact". Guillot wrote that the "show kicked off with one of the best matches in NXT history and finished with another Match of the Year candidate that told one of the great stories in wrestling history". John Moore of Pro Wrestling Dot Net wrote that "each match delivered at a main event level", describing the main event between Gargano and Ciampa as a "perfect end of their year long tale". Matty Paddock of The Independent wrote that the event "delivered in breathtaking style", calling it "a classic night of wrestling that will be hard to match". Dave Meltzer of the Wrestling Observer Newsletter gave both the ladder match for the NXT North American Championship and the unsanctioned match five stars.

== Results ==
No.	Results	Stipulations	Times
1^{N}	Kairi Sane defeated Lacey Evans by pinfall	Singles match	7:43
2^{N}	Heavy Machinery (Otis Dozovic and Tucker Knight) vs. Riddick Moss and Tino Sabbatelli ended in a no contest	Tag team match	6:02
3	Adam Cole defeated EC3, Killian Dain, Lars Sullivan, Ricochet, and Velveteen Dream	Ladder match for the inaugural NXT North American Championship	33:28
4	Shayna Baszler defeated Ember Moon (c) by technical submission	Singles match for the NXT Women's Championship	12:56
5	The Undisputed Era (Adam Cole and Kyle O'Reilly) (c) defeated The Authors of Pain (Akam and Rezar) and Pete Dunne and Roderick Strong by pinfall	Dusty Rhodes Tag Team Classic triple threat tournament final match for the NXT Tag Team Championship	17:38
6	Aleister Black defeated Andrade "Cien" Almas (c) (with Zelina Vega) by pinfall	Singles match for the NXT Championship	27:30
7	Johnny Gargano defeated Tommaso Ciampa by submission	Unsanctioned match Since Gargano won, he was reinstated to NXT.	37:00
(c) / – the champion(s) heading into the match; N / – the match was taped for a future broadcast of NXT

=== Dusty Rhodes Tag Team Classic ===
First round NXT; February 2 – March 7, 2018 (Aired: March 7–21)
Street Profits (Angelo Dawkins and Montez Ford)	Pinfall
Heavy Machinery (Otis Dozovic and Tucker Knight)	3:39
TM-61 (Nick Miller and Shane Thorne)	8:03
Authors of Pain (Akam and Rezar)	Pinfall
Riddick Moss and Tino Sabbatelli	3:45
Sanity (Alexander Wolfe and Eric Young)	Pinfall
Danny Burch and Oney Lorcan	8:29
Pete Dunne and Roderick Strong (Note: Tyler Bate and Trent Seven were originally slated to compete in the tournament. After Bate suffered a knee injury, Pete Dunne and Roderick Strong were their replacement.)	Pinfall

Semifinals; NXT; March 7, 2018 (Aired: March 28)
Street Profits	2:31
Authors of Pain	Pinfall
Sanity	10:23
Pete Dunne and Roderick Strong	Pinfall

Final (Note: The original tournament final took place on the April 4 episode of NXT, but it ended in a double disqualification because of an outside interference by The Undisputed Era.); NXT TakeOver: New Orleans; April 7, 2018
The Undisputed Era (Note: The Undisputed Era defended the NXT Tag Team Championship in the tournament final, which was a Winner Takes All triple threat tag team match.) (Adam Cole and Kyle O'Reilly)	Pinfall
Authors of Pain Pete Dunne and Roderick Strong (Note: Roderick Strong turned on Pete Dunne during the match, helping The Undisputed Era win the match.)	17:38 —
