= Johnny Gargano =

American professional wrestler (born 1987)

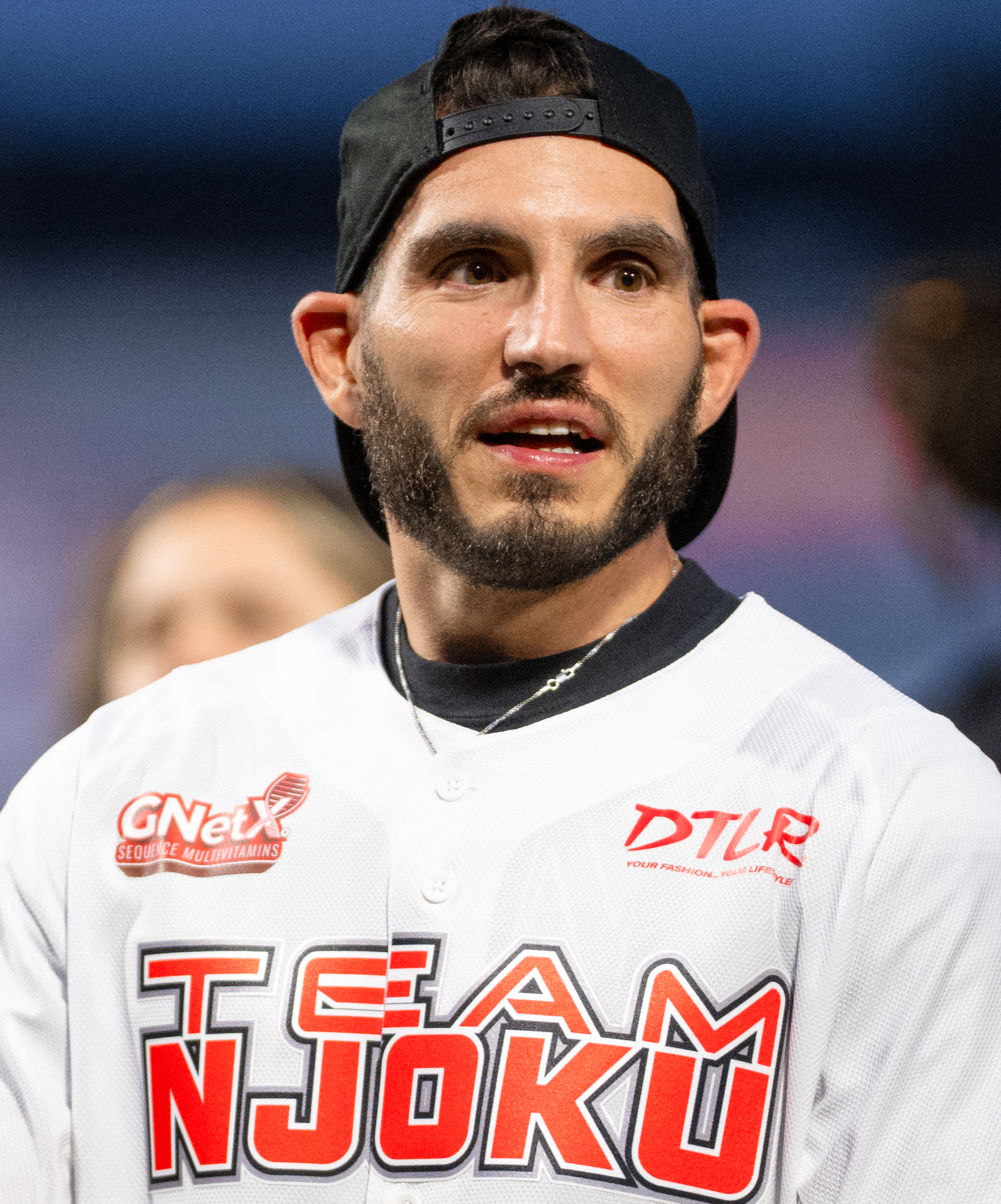
- Gargano in 2025

Personal information
- Born: John Anthony Nicholas Gargano; August 14, 1987 (age 39) Lakewood, Ohio, U.S.
- Spouse: Candice LeRae (m. 2016)
- Children: 1

Professional wrestling career
- Ring name(s): Cedrick Von Haussen; Joey Gray; Johnny Gargano
- Billed height: 5 ft 10 in (178 cm)
- Billed weight: 199 lb (90 kg)
- Billed from: Cleveland, Ohio; The Land of Cleve, Ohio; Schaan, Liechtenstein
- Trained by: Josh Prohibition; J.T. Lightning
- Debut: July 8, 2005

Twitch information
- Channel: TheJohnnyWrestling
- Years active: 2021–present
- Genres: Gaming; Talk
- Followers: 41.9 thousand

YouTube information
- Channel: JohnnyGargano
- Years active: 2010–present
- Genres: Gaming; vlog; professional wrestling
- Subscribers: 71.2 thousand
- Views: 2 million
- Last updated: July 27, 2024

John Anthony Nicholas Gargano (born August 14, 1987) is an American professional wrestler. He is signed to WWE, where he performs on the SmackDown brand.

Gargano started his professional wrestling career in 2005, working for the Cleveland All–Pro Wrestling (CAPW) promotion. Over the following years, Gargano worked for some of the top promotions on the American independent circuit, including Chikara, Dragon Gate USA (DGUSA), Evolve and Pro Wrestling Guerrilla (PWG). Titles Gargano held include the Chikara Campeonatos de Parejas, the Evolve Tag Team Championship and DGUSA's Open the Freedom Gate Championship, which he held twice with his first reign lasting a record 873 days. During his independent days, Gargano also made appearances for national promotions Ring of Honor (ROH) and Total Nonstop Action Wrestling (TNA).

After making sporadic appearances for WWE early in his career, Gargano took part in the company's tryout camp in June 2015. Afterwards, he began appearing regularly on the NXT brand, eventually signing a contract in April 2016. He formed a tag team, #DIY, with Tommaso Ciampa, and held the NXT Tag Team Championship once. Following their split up and heated rivalry, Gargano captured the NXT North American Championship in January 2019 and won the NXT Championship in April the same year. With the win, Gargano became the first ever NXT Triple Crown champion. In 2020, Gargano won the NXT North American Championship for a second, and later that year, a third time, becoming the first competitor to do so each time.

He departed WWE after his contract expired in December 2021, but returned in August 2022 as a permanent member of the main roster. He would then reunite with Tommaso Ciampa as #DIY the following year with the pair going on to win the WWE Tag Team Championship in July and December 2024. The pair remained a team until Ciampa's departure from WWE in January 2026.

== Early life ==
John Anthony Nicholas "Johnny" Gargano was born and raised in the Cleveland, Ohio suburb of Lakewood, to Adrienne (née Klasinski) and restaurateur Francis Gargano. He is of Polish descent through his mother and Italian descent through his father. Gargano entered a professional wrestling ring for the first time at age eight, when Cleveland All–Pro Wrestling (CAPW) owner J.T. Lightning, who ran shows behind Gargano's father's catering business, allowed him to roll around in the ring. While still a student at St. Edward High School, he decided to enter CAPW's professional wrestling school in order to become a professional wrestler. At age 16, Gargano began training at the Cleveland All Pro Training Center under J.T. Lightning and Josh Prohibition.

== Professional wrestling career ==
=== Early career and tryouts ===
Gargano made his professional wrestling debut for CAPW in 2005. In his first match, he competed in the AIW Gauntlet For The Gold Battle Royal on December 11, 2005, which was won by Michael Hutter. Gargano calls his wrestling style "Lucharesu", a mix of British chain wrestling, lucha libre and puroresu and described his character at the time as "someone lacking self awareness and living in his own deluded little world". On October 8, 2006, Gargano defeated Josh Prohibition, M-Dogg 20, and Zach Gowen in a four-way match to win his first Championship, the CAPW Junior Heavyweight Championship. He would continue to make appearances for the company until August 5, 2007, teaming up with Prohibition in his CAPW farewell match, where they defeated Alex Shelley and Chris Sabin.

On June 24, 2009, Gargano wrestled in a dark match at Total Nonstop Action Wrestling's Impact! television tapings, losing to Jay Lethal. The following day he wrestled in another dark match, this time losing to Eric Young. Gargano has also wrestled in a dark match for Ring of Honor, defeating Sami Callihan on August 15, 2008. After his ROH tryout it was discovered that Gargano had a hairline fracture in his back, caused by his left leg being shorter than his right leg, which led to his doctor advising him to rethink his career choice. Gargano, however, returned to the ring six months later.

=== Absolute Intense Wrestling (2006–2016) ===
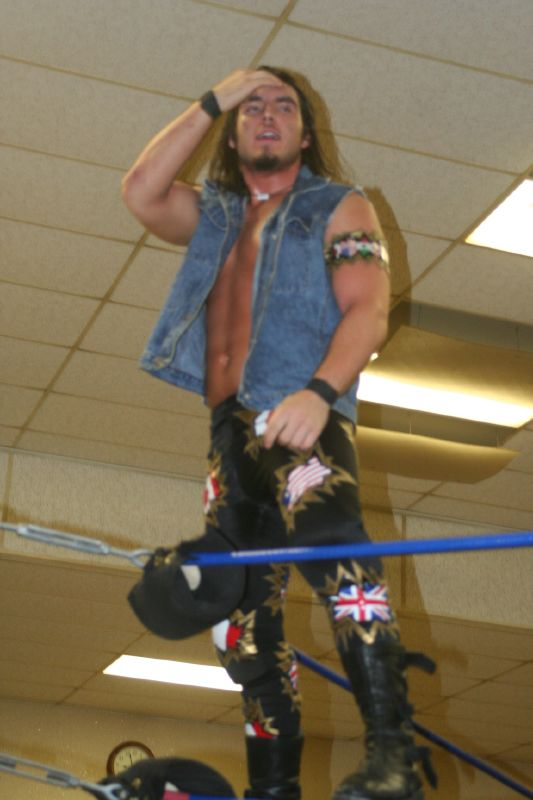
Gargano in June 2008

Gargano made his debut for Cleveland–based Absolute Intense Wrestling (AIW) on February 26, 2006, losing to Kano. He would pick up his first victory in the promotion two months later on April 30, defeating Tyrone Evans. On February 24, 2008, Gargano defeated his trainer Josh Prohibition to become the number one contender to the AIW Intense Division Championship. After Gargano's first shot at the title, held by Tyler Black, went to a fifteen-minute time limit draw on March 21, the two were booked in a 30-minute Iron Man match on May 25, where Gargano defeated Black to win the Intense Division Championship for the first time. Gargano held the title for 187 days before he was stripped of it due to an injury on November 28, 2008. On February 28, 2009, Gargano defeated Jimmy DeMarco, who had won the vacant Intense Division Championship in a tournament, to regain the title. He would go on to lose the title to Josh Prohibition on May 15, 2009.

On April 9, 2010, Gargano teamed up with Aeroform (Flip Kendrick and Louis Lyndon) to form Team Oreo for the Jack of All Trios tournament, a tournament held for sixteen teams of three. After defeating Psycho Sexual Panic (Corvis Fear, Michael Facade and Shiima Xion) on night one of the tournament, Gargano and Aeroform advanced to night two, where they defeated Team Beyond Wrestling (Chase Burnett, Davey Vega and Zane Silver), Da Soul Touchaz (Acid Jaz, Marshe Rockett and Willie Richardson) and finally the Young Studs (Bobby Beverly, Eric Ryan and T.J. Dynamite) to win the tournament. As a result of winning the tournament, Gargano and Aeroform earned the right to represent AIW in Chikara's 2010 King of Trios tournament. On June 27, Gargano defeated Facade, Sterling James Keenan and Tommy Mercer in a four-way match to win AIW's top singles title, the vacant AIW Absolute Championship, for the first time. Later that same night, Gargano retained his brand new title by wrestling Bryan Danielson to a 30-minute time limit draw. He would go on to lose the title to Shiima Xion on June 26, 2011. On March 3, 2012, Gargano won a 30-man Gauntlet for the Gold, last eliminating Tim Donst, to earn a shot at Xion and the AIW Absolute Championship.

=== Chikara (2008, 2010–2013, 2016) ===
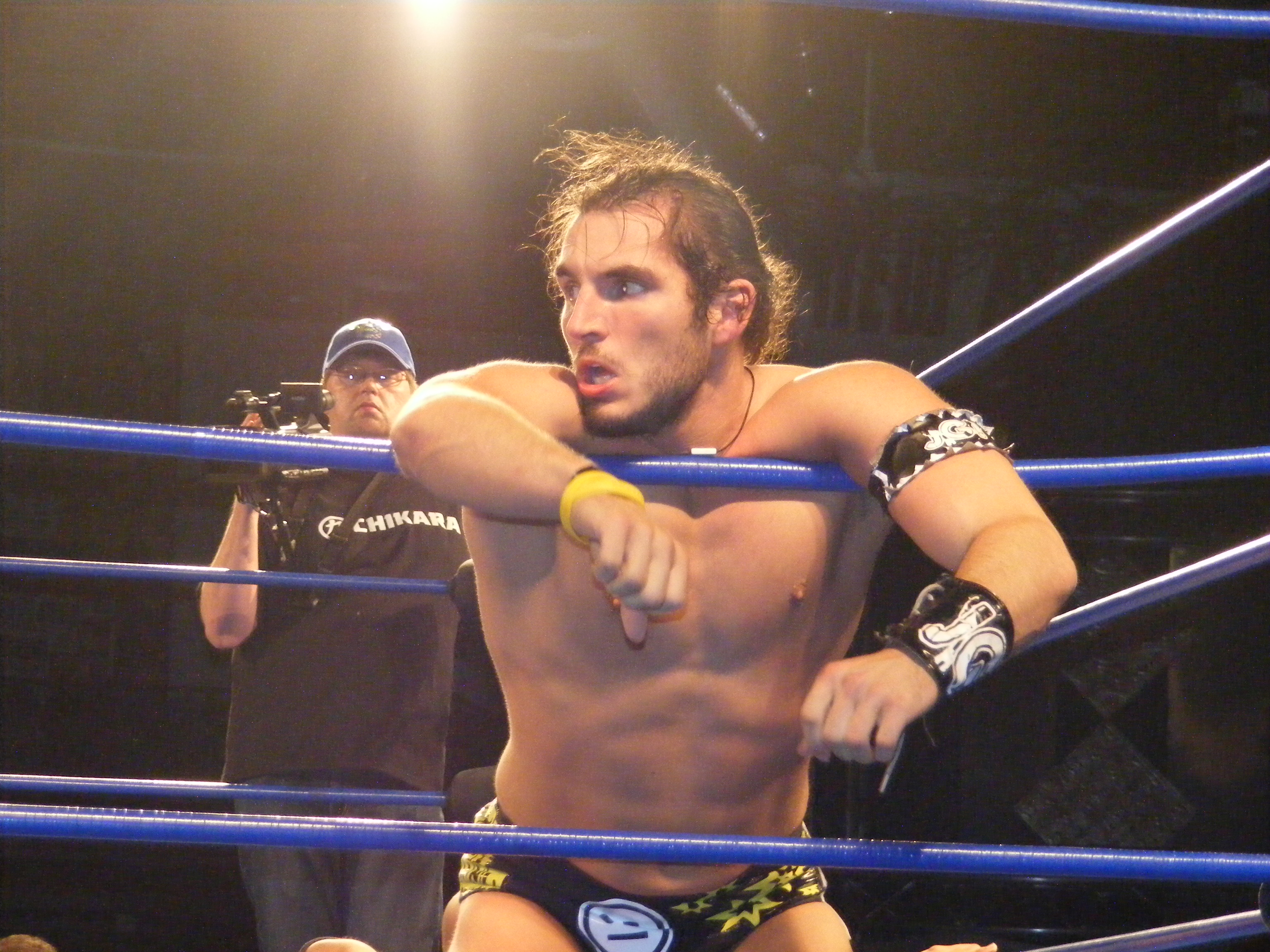
Gargano at Chikara's King of Trios tournament in April 2010

Gargano made his debut for Philadelphia–based Chikara on June 14, 2008, taking part in the sixth Young Lions Cup tournament, but was eliminated in the first round against Marshe Rockett. Gargano returned to the company on April 23, 2010, taking part in the 2010 King of Trios tournament with Aeroform and suffering a loss in the opening round against The Colony (Fire Ant, Green Ant and Soldier Ant). On the second night of the tournament, Gargano came out during a quarter-final match between F.I.S.T. (Icarus, Gran Akuma and Chuck Taylor) and Team Osaka Pro (Atsushi Kotoge, Daisuke Harada and Tadasuke), wearing a F.I.S.T. shirt and witnessed how Icarus, Akuma and Taylor were eliminated from the tournament. Gargano wrote on his Facebook page that he liked F.I.S.T., but thought that the team might have a weak link, which led to the stable's members pointing fingers at each other. On June 27 at Faded Scars and Lines, Gargano defeated Player Uno to earn a spot in the eighth Young Lions Cup tournament. On July 26 at Chikarasaurus Rex: King of Show, F.I.S.T. lost a six-man tag team match to Cima, Masaaki Mochizuki and Super Shenglong. After the match, Icarus and Taylor turned on Akuma, kicked him out of both F.I.S.T. and Chikara and gave his spot to Gargano. On August 27, Gargano entered his second Young Lions Cup tournament, defeating Andy Ridge in the first round but was eliminated from the tournament when he was disqualified in the six-way elimination semi final match. On August 29, Gargano defeated 29 other men to win The Countdown Showdown match and earn a "Golden Opportunity". With Gargano as a member, the new F.I.S.T. ended their losing streak by defeating Da Soul Touchaz (Acid Jaz, Marshe Rockett and Willie Richardson) and 3.0 (Scott Parker and Shane Matthews) and Soldier Ant in six-man tag team matches on September 18 and 19. On October 23, Gargano cashed in his "Golden Opportunity" for a Young Lions Cup title match against Frightmare, but lost. On April 15, 2011, F.I.S.T. entered the 2011 King of Trios, defeating Team Australia (Kabel, Percy T and Tama Williams) in the first round. The following day, F.I.S.T. defeated Team Osaka Pro (Atsushi Kotoge, Daisuke Harada and Ultimate Spider Jr.) to advance to the semifinals. On April 17, F.I.S.T. scored a major upset in the semifinals of the tournament by defeating Team Michinoku Pro (Dick Togo, Great Sasuke and Jinsei Shinzaki) but lost in the finals of the tournament to The Colony.

In June and July, Gargano and Taylor gained three points and the right to challenge for the Chikara Campeonatos de Parejas with victories over The Colony, Incoherence (Frightmare and Hallowicked) and Atlantis and Rey Bucanero. On September 18, Gargano and Taylor defeated Jigsaw and Mike Quackenbush to win the Chikara Campeonatos de Parejas for the first time. Gargano and Taylor made their first title defense on October 7, defeating Momo no Seishun Tag (Atsushi Kotoge and Daisuke Harada) with help from Icarus. On October 7, Icarus replaced Gargano, who was unable to attend due to travel issues, and teamed with Taylor to retain the Campeonatos de Parejas against the Throwbacks (Dasher Hatfield and Sugar Dunkerton), after which Gargano and Taylor defended the title on December 2, during Chikara's special post-season JoshiMania weekend, defeating The Colony. Gargano was sidelined with a back injury and Icarus replaced him; he and Chuck Taylor retained the Campeonatos de Parejas on February 25, 2012, against the Spectral Envoy (Hallowicked and UltraMantis Black), before losing the title to 3.0 on March 24. After earning three points in a four-way elimination match on April 14, Gargano and Taylor defeated 3.0 in a rematch on April 29 to regain the title and become the first two-time Campeones de Parejas. On June 2 at Chikarasaurus Rex: How to Hatch a Dinosaur, F.I.S.T. lost the title to The Young Bucks (Matt and Nick Jackson) in their first title defense. On August 2, Chikara's Director of Fun, Wink Vavasseur, named Sugar Dunkerton, who had stated his wish to join a stable, the fourth member of F.I.S.T. The other members, however, refused to accept Dunkerton as a full-fledged member, instead referring to him as their "water boy".

On September 14, F.I.S.T., represented by Gargano, Icarus and Taylor, entered the 2012 King of Trios tournament, defeating Team Osaka Pro (Ebessan, Kikutaro and Takoyakida) in the first round. The following day, F.I.S.T. defeated the all-female Team JWP (Command Bolshoi, Kaori Yoneyama and Tsubasa Kuragaki) to advance to the semifinals. On the third and final day of the tournament, F.I.S.T. was eliminated in the semifinals by the Spectral Envoy (Frightmare, Hallowicked and UltraMantis Black). In early 2013, the members of F.I.S.T. began having problems with each other, leading to Icarus turning on Gargano on May 3 over his treatment of Sugar Dunkerton. Following the turn, Gargano quit F.I.S.T., which was followed by Chikara removing his profile from the promotion's official roster page. He returned on September 2, 2016, entering the 2016 King of Trios tournament as part of Team #CWC, alongside Cedric Alexander and Drew Gulak. They were eliminated from the tournament in the first round by The Warriors Three (Oleg the Usurper, Princess KimberLee and ThunderFrog).

=== Dragon Gate USA and Evolve (2009–2016) ===
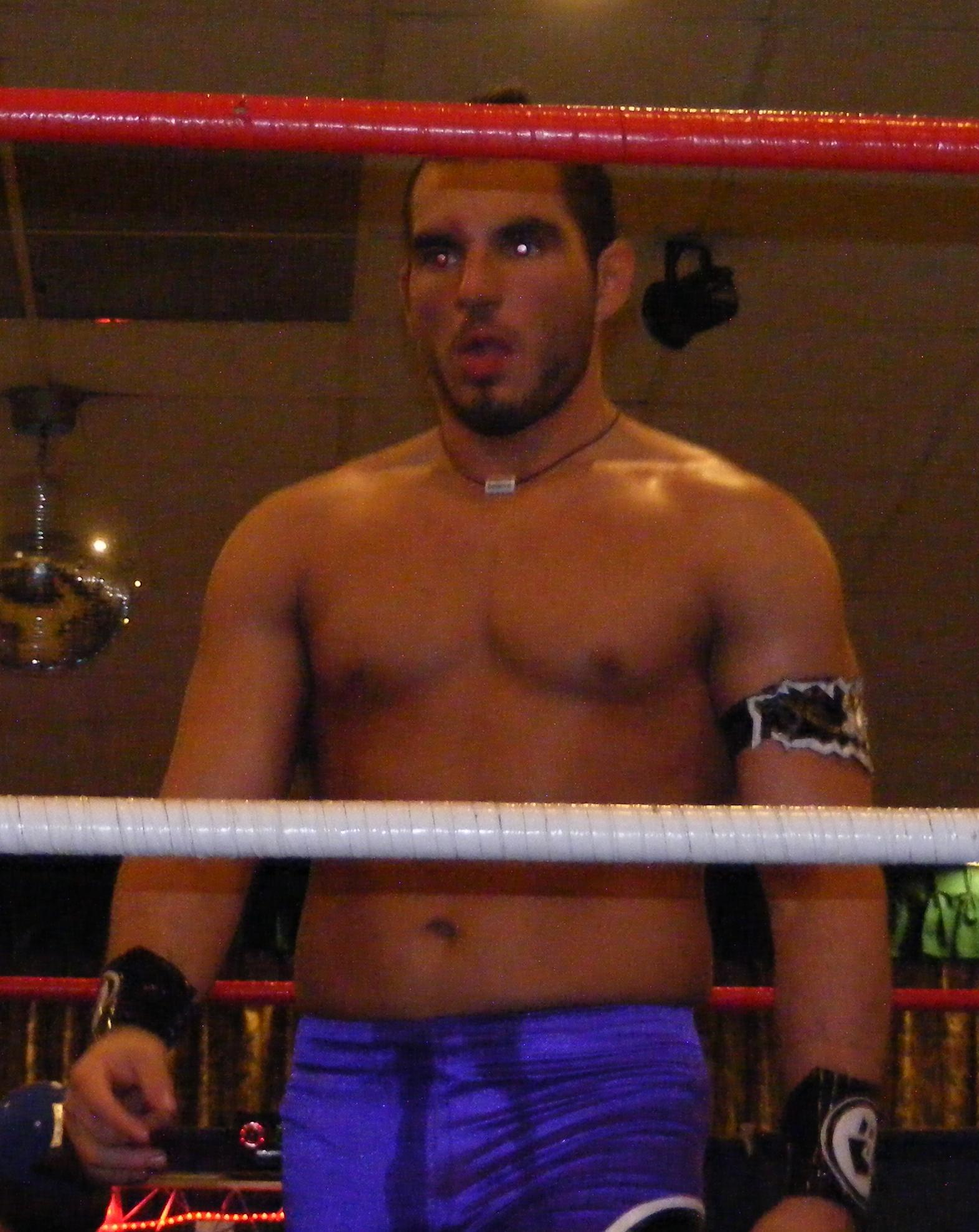
Gargano in October 2010

While wrestling for Chicago-based All American Wrestling (AAW), Gargano ran into Colt Cabana, who suggested he get in touch with former Ring of Honor booker Gabe Sapolsky, who was looking for talents for Dragon Gate USA and Evolve Wrestling, and tell him that Cabana sent him. Gargano received a tryout match for Dragon Gate on July 25, 2009, at the tapings of the Enter the Dragon pay-per-view, wrestling in an eight-way elimination dark match won by Lince Dorado. On November 28 at Freedom Fight, Gargano made his pay-per-view debut by entering the tournament to crown the first Open the Freedom Gate Champion, but was eliminated in the first round. In May, Gargano signed a contract with Dragon Gate USA. On July 24 at Enter the Dragon, Gargano lost to Cima. On September 26, Gargano offered himself to Cima's Warriors International stable. On October 29 at Dragon Gate USA's first live pay-per-view, Bushido: Code of the Warrior, Gargano wrestled in a four-way match won by Chuck Taylor. After Taylor turned down an offer from Cima to join his Warriors International stable, Gargano offered himself to Cima but was turned down. Gargano confronted Cima again, offering himself to Warriors International, before attacking him and Ricochet, along with Chuck Taylor and Rich Swann, forming the stable Ronin.

On January 29, 2011, Gargano and Taylor entered a three-day-long tournament to determine the first ever Open the United Gate Champions. Gargano and Taylor defeated Naruki Doi and Ricochet and followed it up by defeating Cima and Dragon Kid, before losing in the finals to Masato Yoshino and PAC. On April 1 at Open the Southern Gate, Gargano lost to Cima, with Ronin now working as a babyface group against Cima's Blood Warriors. The following day at Mercury Rising, Ronin lost a six-man tag team match to Cima, Doi and Ricochet. On April 3 at Open the Ultimate Gate, Austin Aries, who lost a match with his Dragon Gate USA career on the line, feigned passing the torch to his former Ronin rivals, but turned on them and joined Blood Warriors. Gargano defeated Jon Davis on April 19 at Evolve's first live internet pay-per-view. Later that same night, he defeated Chuck Taylor in a tiebreaker match to become Evolve's new wins leader with a record of 6–2. On June 3 at Fearless, Gargano lost to Aries, but came back two days later at Enter The Dragon to force Cima and Aries to submit in a six-man elimination tag team match, where he teamed with Rich Swann and Masato Yoshino with Brodie Lee being the third member of Blood Warriors.

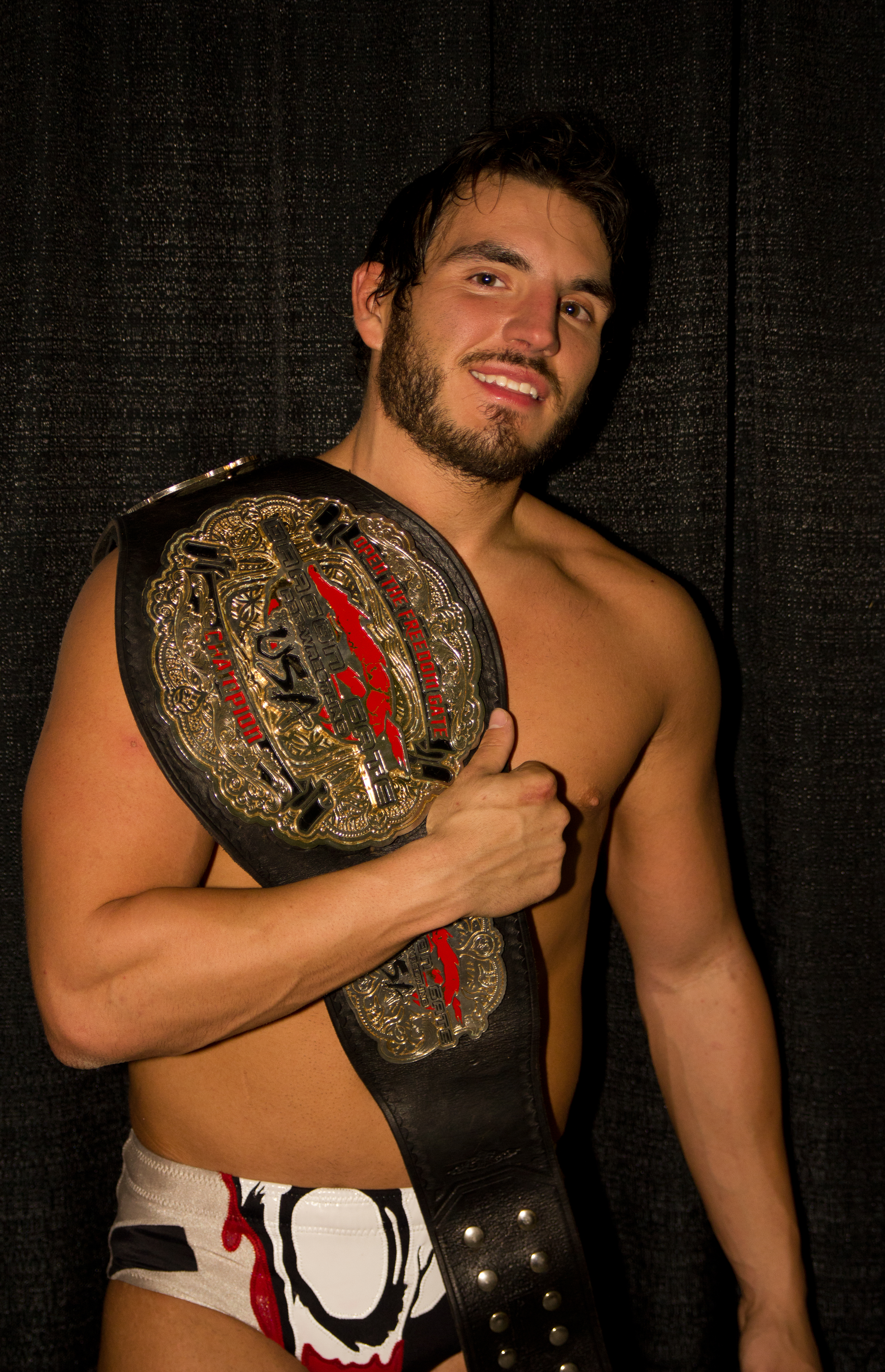
Gargano with the Open the Freedom Gate Championship belt in January 2013

On November 13 at Freedom Fight, Gargano defeated Yamato to win the Open the Freedom Gate Championship. On January 14, 2012, Gargano retained the title against Ricochet in the final professional wrestling match in the Asylum Arena. Following the match, Gargano was helped backstage and rushed to a hospital with a back injury, but was released the following day. On March 30, Gargano returned to Dragon Gate USA, where he and Chuck Taylor unsuccessfully fought Masato Yoshino and Ricochet for the vacant Open the United Gate Championship; Taylor then turned on Gargano and broke away from Ronin. Following the merger of Dragon Gate USA and Evolve, Gargano successfully defended the Open the Freedom Gate Championship against Taylor on June 29 at Evolve 15. On July 28 at Untouchable, Gargano retained the title against Akira Tozawa. Prior to the event it had been reported that Gargano had been offered a developmental contract with WWE, however, following his win, Gargano revealed that he had signed a two-year contract extension with Dragon Gate USA/Evolve. The following day at Enter the Dragon, Gargano defeated Chuck Taylor in a non-title "I Quit" match, ending their rivalry. Gargano made another successful defense of the Open the Freedom Gate Championship on September 8, defeating Jon Davis at Evolve 17. On November 4 at Freedom Fight, despite a pre-match assault by Jon Davis, Gargano defeated Tozawa, A. R. Fox and Ricochet in a four-way elimination match to retain the Open the Freedom Gate Championship and, as a result, made it to a full year as the champion. On December 8 at Evolve 18, Gargano retained the title against Sami Callihan.

On April 6, 2013, Gargano retained the Open the Freedom Gate Championship against Shingo after hitting him with a low blow and a chain, turning villainous in the process. Gargano's streak of successful title defenses continued against the likes of Samuray del Sol, Akira Tozawa, and Rich Swann. Having now held the Open the Freedom Gate Championship for two years, Gargano retained the title on November 17 against Chris Hero. Gargano's successful title defenses continued in early 2014, when he defeated Uhaa Nation, Trent Baretta, and Roderick Strong. On March 27, it was reported that Gargano had signed a contract extension with Dragon Gate USA. On April 4, Gargano lost the Open the Freedom Gate Championship to Ricochet in a match one year in the making, ending his two and a half year reign. The rivalry between Gargano and Rich Swann culminated in an "Evolution's End" match on August 10, where Swann was victorious. Post-match, Gargano saved Swann from an attack by the Premier Athlete Brand of Anthony Nese, Caleb Konley and Su Yung.

On November 16, 2014, during Dragon Gate USA's parent company WWNLive's tour of China, Gargano defeated Ricochet to regain the Open the Freedom Gate Championship, becoming the first two-time holder of the title. On March 26, 2015, Gargano retained the Open the Freedom Gate Championship against A. R. Fox to set up a double title match with Evolve World Champion Drew Galloway two days later, where Galloway defeated Gargano to retain the Evolve World Championship and win the Open the Freedom Gate Championship. Following the match, Ethan Page turned on Gargano, starting a feud between the two with the storyline being that Gargano got Page his job in Evolve, but he was now trying to make himself a name at Gargano's expense. On April 18, Gargano and Swann defeated Anthony Nese and Caleb Konley to win the Open the United Gate Championship. On May 30, Ronin successfully defended the title against Drew Gulak and Tracy Williams. After the match, Gargano retired the Open the United Gate Championship since Dragon Gate was the past and demanded the creation of the Evolve Tag Team Championship. Gargano's partnership with Swann ended on August 15, when Swann turned on Gargano and joined forces with Ethan Page. The feud between Gargano and Page culminated on October 17 at Evolve 49, where Gargano defeated Page in an "I Quit" match, where his Evolve career was on the line. On January 24, 2016, at Evolve 55, Gargano and Drew Galloway defeated Chris Hero and Tommy End in the finals of a tournament to become the inaugural Evolve Tag Team Champions. They lost the title to Drew Gulak and Tracy Williams on April 2. After the match, Galloway turned on Gargano. The feud between Gargano and Galloway concluded on July 17 at Evolve 65, where Gargano lost to Galloway.

On July 21, Evolve revealed Gargano's impending departure from the promotion with his final match taking place on September 11. On September 10 at Evolve 68, Gargano was defeated by Zack Sabre Jr. in his final singles match in Evolve. The following day at Evolve 69, Gargano and Cody Rhodes defeated Chris Hero and Drew Galloway in Gargano's Evolve farewell match.

=== Dragon Gate (2011, 2012) ===
On March 1, 2011, Gargano made his Japanese debut, when his Dragon Gate USA stable Ronin started their first three-week-long tour of Dragon Gate. In their first match of the tour, Gargano, Chuck Taylor and Rich Swann defeated Blood Warriors representatives Cima, Naruki Doi and Naoki Tanizaki in a six-man tag team match.

Gargano returned to Dragon Gate in October 2012, now aligned with the World-1 International stable. In his first match of the tour on October 6, Gargano teamed with Masato Yoshino and Naruki Doi to defeat Kaettekita Veteran-gun representatives Don Fujii, Gamma and Masaaki Mochizuki in a six-man tag team main event. The following day, Gargano defeated Ryo "Jimmy" Saito to retain the Open the Freedom Gate Championship.

=== Pro Wrestling Guerrilla (2013–2015) ===
On March 22, 2013, Gargano made his debut for Southern California-based Pro Wrestling Guerrilla (PWG) during the promotion's All Star Weekend 9, teaming with Chuck Taylor in a non-title tag team match, where they were defeated by the reigning PWG World Tag Team Champions, The Young Bucks. Gargano returned to PWG on June 15, when he and Taylor lost to the Dojo Bros. (Eddie Edwards and Roderick Strong). On August 30, Gargano entered the 2013 Battle of Los Angeles, defeating Willie Mack in the first round. The following day, Gargano defeated Kevin Steen in the second round, before being eliminated from the tournament in the semifinals by Michael Elgin. On October 20, Gargano defeated Roderick Strong and, at the end of the event, challenged Adam Cole to a future match for the PWG World Championship. Gargano received his title shot during the second day of All Star Weekend X on December 21, but was defeated by Cole. Gargano failed to earn another title shot on January 31, 2014, when he was defeated by Drake Younger in a four-way number one contender's match, which also included Chris Hero and Kyle O'Reilly. In August, Gargano made it to the finals of the 2014 Battle of Los Angeles, before losing to Ricochet in a three-way match, also involving Roderick Strong. On December 11, 2015, Gargano and Tommaso Ciampa unsuccessfully challenged The Young Bucks for the PWG World Tag Team Championship.

=== WWE (2015–2021; 2022–present) ===
==== Early appearances (2007–2011) ====
On March 23, 2007, Gargano appeared as the "Champion of Liechtenstein", Cedrick Von Haussen, on an episode of World Wrestling Entertainment's television program SmackDown!, losing to Montel Vontavious Porter. He made another appearance for WWE on the May 25, 2010, edition of NXT, portraying a security guard. Gargano wrestled another tryout for WWE, working under the ring name Joey Gray, at the September 20, 2011, tapings of Superstars, losing to Brodus Clay.

==== DIY (2015–2017) ====
In June 2015, Gargano took part in a WWE tryout camp, and also wrestled at the June 18 NXT tapings, losing to Uhaa Nation in a dark match. Though he did not sign with WWE, Gargano continued making appearances for NXT over the next few months. In Gargano's first televised NXT match he teamed with Tommaso Ciampa in the Dusty Rhodes Tag Team Classic tournament, defeating the team of Bull Dempsey and Tyler Breeze in their first round match on the September 9 episode. They were eliminated from the tournament by Baron Corbin and Rhyno on the September 16 episode. Gargano continued working for NXT in early 2016. On April 2, it was confirmed that Gargano had signed with WWE earlier in the week. Gargano's NXT contract was a so-called "Tier 2" contract, which allowed him to continue working independent dates alongside his now regular NXT bookings. On June 23, Gargano entered the Cruiserweight Classic tournament, defeating his tag team partner Tommaso Ciampa the first round. On July 14, Gargano was eliminated from the tournament by T.J. Perkins. On July 21, it was reported that Gargano was signing a new full-time NXT deal, which would prevent him from taking further independent bookings.

On August 20 at NXT TakeOver: Brooklyn II, Gargano and Ciampa unsuccessfully challenged The Revival (Dash Wilder and Scott Dawson) for the NXT Tag Team Championship. Gargano and Ciampa, now billed collectively as "DIY" (often stylized as #DIY), challenged The Revival for another title shot in a two-out-of-three falls match on November 19 at NXT TakeOver: Toronto, where they went on to become the new NXT Tag Team Champions. DIY went on to successfully defend their championships against the teams of Tajiri and Akira Tozawa, and TM61 (Nick Miller and Shane Thorne) in their respective home countries of Japan and Australia, and against The Revival in a rubber match on the January 11, 2017 episode of NXT, ending their trilogy feud with the latter team, after which they would be attacked by The Authors of Pain. At NXT TakeOver: San Antonio on January 28, 2017, they lost the titles to The Authors of Pain causing their championship reign to end at just 70 days. They received their rematch on the March 1 episode of NXT, which ended in a no contest after The Revival interfered and attacked both teams. This led to a triple threat elimination match between all three teams for the NXT Tag Team Championship at NXT TakeOver: Orlando on April 1, which DIY lost after being the first team eliminated.

On May 20 at NXT TakeOver: Chicago, DIY once again faced The Authors of Pain in the first-ever ladder match for the NXT Tag Team Championship, which they lost. After the match, Ciampa turned on Gargano to end the partnership between the two. Their feud continued when Gargano faced Andrade "Cien" Almas at NXT TakeOver: Brooklyn III, but he lost after Almas' valet, Zelina Vega, threw a #DIY shirt at Gargano to distract him. On the December 6 episode of NXT, Gargano defeated Kassius Ohno to qualify for a number one contender's fatal four-way match for the NXT Championship involving Aleister Black, Killian Dain and Lars Sullivan, which Gargano won after pinning Black (becoming the first man to do so).

==== Feud with Tommaso Ciampa (2018–2019) ====
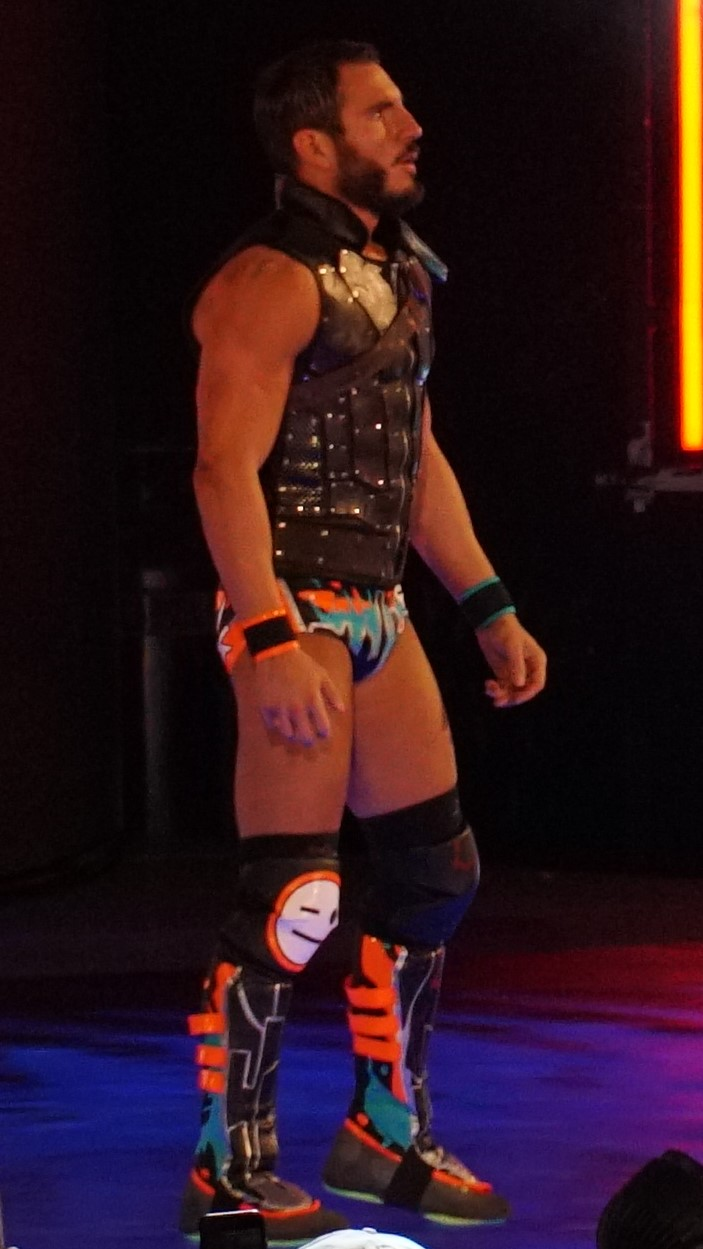
Gargano at NXT TakeOver: New Orleans in April 2018

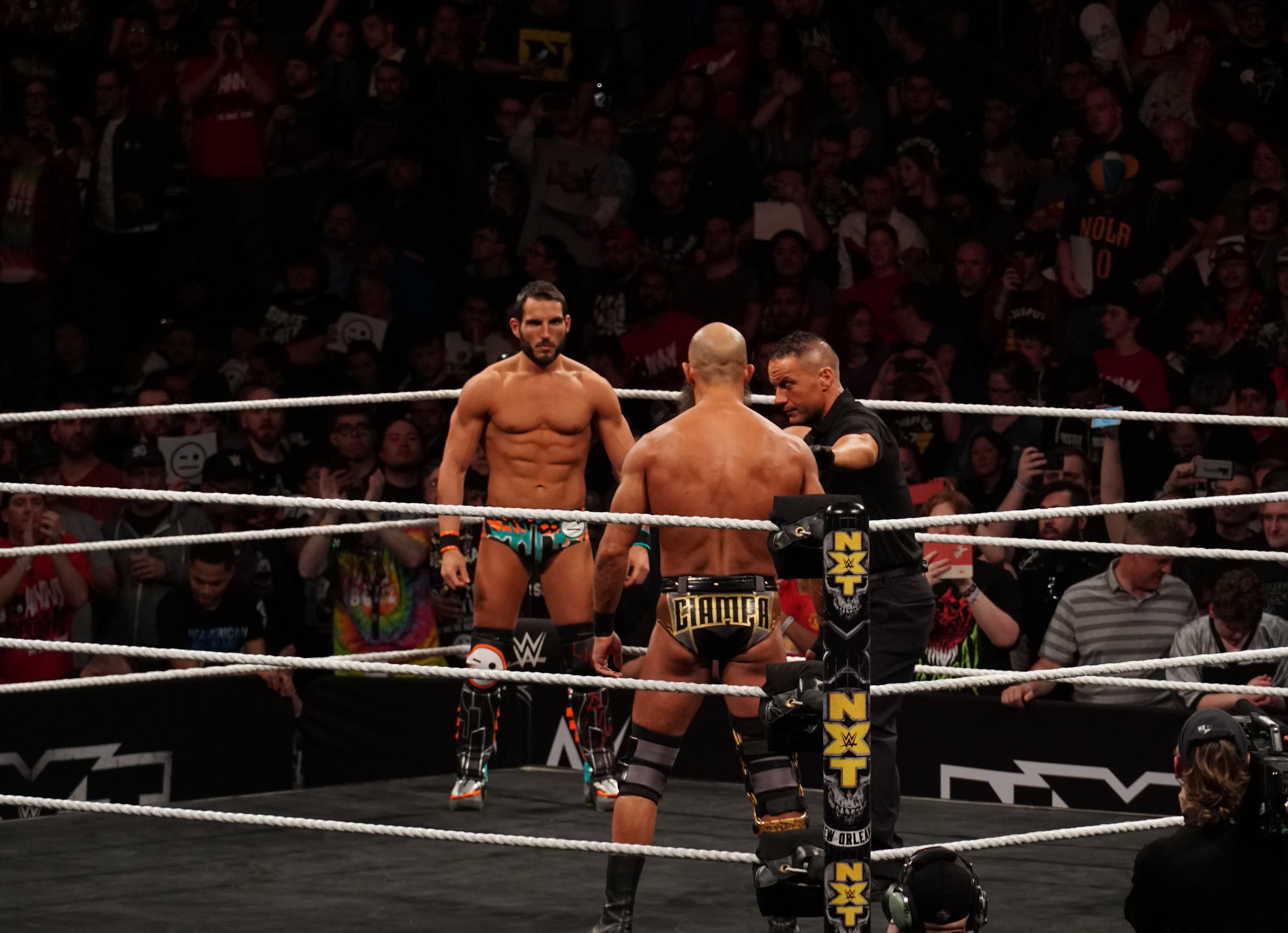
Gargano (back) facing Tommaso Ciampa at NXT TakeOver: New Orleans in April 2018

At NXT TakeOver: Philadelphia on January 27, 2018, Gargano challenged Andrade "Cien" Almas for the NXT Championship, which he lost again, even after his wife, Candice LeRae, helped fend off a distraction from Zelina Vega. Afterwards, Tommaso Ciampa returned to attack Gargano from behind with a crutch. Gargano faced Almas for the title again on the February 21 episode of NXT, where Gargano failed to win the title after interference from Ciampa, thus forcing him to (kayfabe) leave NXT. At NXT TakeOver: New Orleans on April 7, he defeated Ciampa in an unsanctioned match to be reinstated to NXT. On the April 25 episode of NXT, Gargano was once again attacked by Ciampa while he was making his entrance for his NXT Championship match against Aleister Black, leading to a Chicago Street Fight between them at NXT TakeOver: Chicago II on June 16, which Ciampa won.

At the July 18 NXT tapings of the July 25 episode, Gargano interfered in Ciampa's NXT Championship match against Black and accidentally hit Black with the title belt, causing Ciampa to win the championship. The following week, all three men were scheduled in a triple threat match for the NXT Championship at NXT TakeOver: Brooklyn IV on August 18, though Black was removed from the match due to being unable to compete after being found unconscious in the parking lot after the show. The title match was later changed to a Last Man Standing match between Gargano and Ciampa at the event, which Ciampa won. On the October 24 episode of NXT, Gargano was revealed as the one who attacked Aleister Black, turning heel in the process. Black and Gargano continued their rivalry, culminating in a match at NXT TakeOver: WarGames II on November 17, which Black won. On the December 19 episode of NXT, Gargano defeated Black in a steel cage match after interference from Ciampa, ending their feud.

At NXT TakeOver: Phoenix on January 26, 2019, Gargano defeated Ricochet to capture the NXT North American Championship. Later in the night, after Ciampa successfully defended his NXT Championship against Black, Gargano reunited with his former tag-team partner as they raised their belts in unison on stage as the show went off air. The following night, he would make his first main roster appearance at the Royal Rumble event, entering at number 6 in the Royal Rumble match, in which he lasted over 13 minutes and eliminated Jinder Mahal before getting eliminated by Dean Ambrose. On the February 20 episode of NXT, Gargano lost the NXT North American Championship to Velveteen Dream.

==== NXT Champion (2019–2020) ====
Gargano made his main roster debut on the February 18, 2019, episode of Raw, where he and Ciampa defeated former rivals Raw Tag Team Champions The Revival in a non-title match. The next night on their SmackDown debut, Gargano and Ciampa defeated The Bar (Cesaro and Sheamus). On the March 13 episode of NXT, after Gargano and Ciampa were eliminated from the Dusty Rhodes Classic, Ciampa attempted to attack Gargano, similar to his original betrayal at TakeOver: Chicago two years prior, before Gargano reversed it and attacked him, thus turning face.

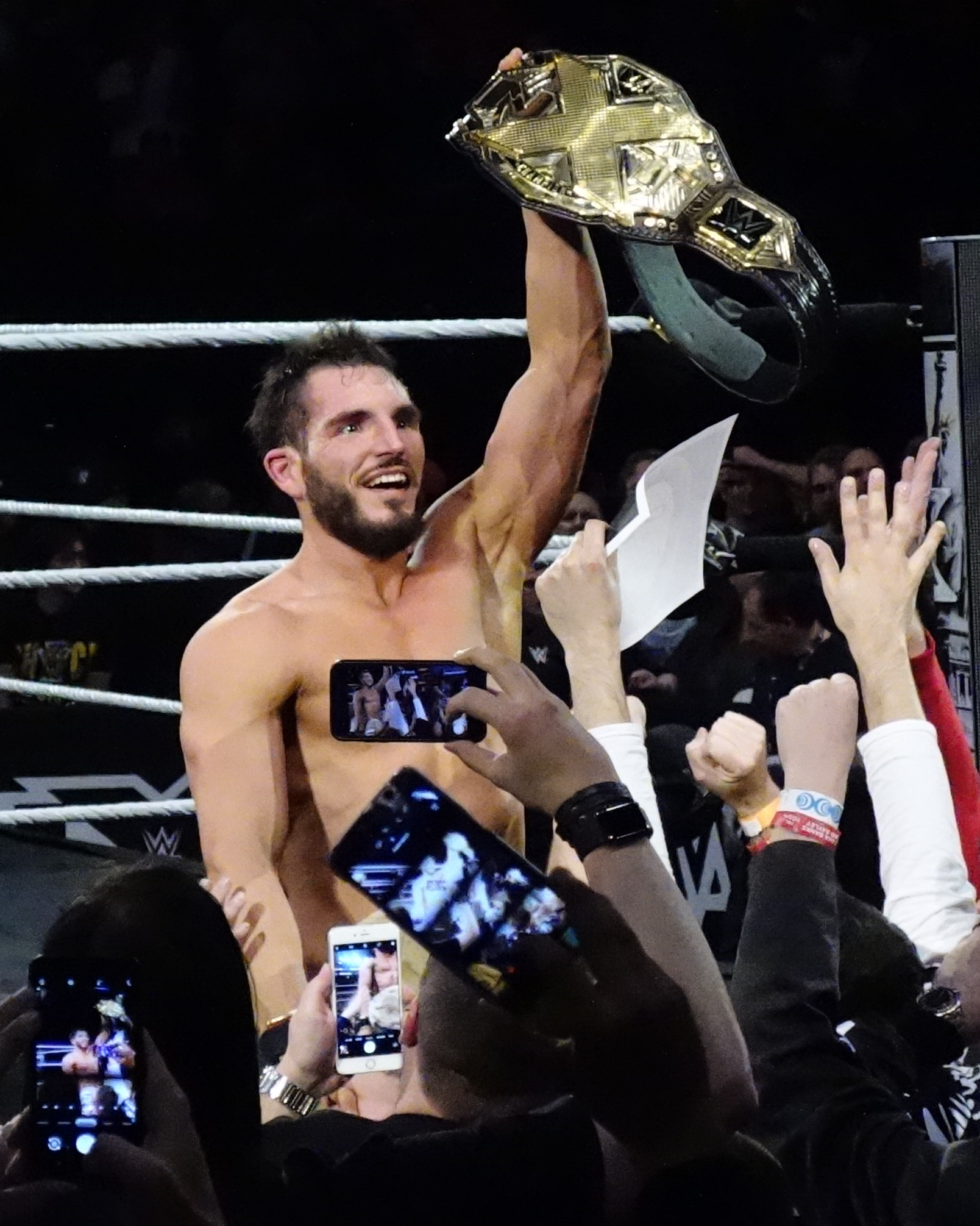
After defeating Adam Cole in April 2019, Gargano won the vacant NXT Championship

On the March 20 episode of NXT, it was revealed by Triple H that Gargano and Ciampa were to compete at NXT TakeOver: New York for the NXT Championship, but due to Ciampa needing real-life neck surgery, he was removed from the match and forced to vacate the title; therefore, it was announced that Gargano would still be in the match for the now vacant title, and his opponent would be Adam Cole, who won a fatal five-way match later that night to earn the right to replace Ciampa. At the event on April 5, Gargano defeated Cole in a critically acclaimed two-out-of-three falls match to win the NXT Championship for the first time in his career, which also made him the first ever NXT Triple Crown Champion. At the end of the show, Ciampa came out to celebrate Gargano's successful title win with Candice LeRae as well. On the April 17 episode of NXT, Gargano was celebrating his championship victory until he was confronted and attacked by The Undisputed Era. A rematch was scheduled between Gargano and Cole to take place at NXT TakeOver XXV on June 1, where Gargano lost the title, ending his reign at 57 days. Gargano's rematch on August 10 at NXT TakeOver: Toronto was then scheduled by William Regal to be another two-out-of-three falls match, with each wrestler allowed to pick a stipulation, with Regal deciding the final fall's stipulation. At the event, Gargano won the second fall, but was ultimately unsuccessful in regaining the title after losing the final fall, which was in a steel cage match, after both men fell from the top of the cage through a table.

On the October 23 episode of NXT, Gargano reunited with Ciampa once again, only to be attacked by The Undisputed Era and surprise NXT returnee Finn Bálor. He suffered a legitimate neck injury when Bálor performed his signature move 1916 on Gargano on the entrance ramp, sidelining him indefinitely. He returned on the December 18 episode of NXT, distracting Bálor during his NXT Championship match against Adam Cole, causing him to lose; he then attacked Bálor with a steel chair post-match.

==== The Way (2020–2021) ====
On the January 8, 2020, episode of NXT, Bálor challenged Gargano to a match at NXT TakeOver: Portland, which Gargano accepted. At Worlds Collide on January 25, Gargano and Ciampa defeated NXT UK's Moustache Mountain. At TakeOver on February 16, Gargano lost to Bálor, and later that same night, Gargano interfered in the main-event between Cole and Ciampa for the NXT Championship and attacked Ciampa with the title while the referee was unconscious, subsequently allowing Cole to pin Ciampa, breaking up DIY for the second time and turning heel for the second time in his WWE career. On the April 8, 2020, episode of NXT, Gargano defeated Ciampa in an Empty Arena No Holds Barred match after Candice LeRae gave Ciampa a lowblow and Gargano hit Ciampa with the Fairytale Ending. Gargano and LeRae then began appearing together more frequently as a power couple.

At TakeOver: In Your House on June 7, Gargano unsuccessfully challenged Keith Lee for the NXT North American Championship. On July 8 at The Great American Bash, Gargano defeated Isaiah "Swerve" Scott. On the July 22 episode of NXT, Gargano faced Bronson Reed and Roderick Strong in a triple threat qualifying match for a spot in the North American Championship ladder match at NXT TakeOver XXX, but lost. After Dexter Lumis dropped out of the match due to an ankle injury, Gargano replaced him by defeating Ridge Holland in a last chance match. At TakeOver XXX on August 22, Gargano failed to win the title. He challenged new champion Damian Priest for the title at NXT TakeOver 31 on October 4, which he failed to win. On October 28 at Halloween Havoc, Gargano defeated Priest in a Devil's Playground match to become the first-ever two-time NXT North American Champion. He lost the title to Leon Ruff on the November 11 episode of NXT, ending his second reign at 14 days, but regained it on December 6 at NXT TakeOver: WarGames in a triple threat match involving Priest to become the first-ever three-time North American Champion. On the December 9 episode of NXT, he announced that he formed a villainous faction with LeRae, Indi Hartwell and Austin Theory called The Way. On the December 30 episode of NXT, Gargano retained his title against Ruff, finally breaking his championship "curse". Gargano's streak of successful title defenses followed, including against Kushida at Vengeance Day on February 14, 2021, and Bronson Reed on April 8 at the second night of NXT TakeOver: Stand & Deliver. On the May 18 episode of NXT, he lost the championship to Reed in a steel cage match, ending his third reign at 163 days.

At In Your House on June 13, Gargano failed to win the NXT Championship in a fatal five-way match involving Adam Cole, Karrion Kross, Kyle O'Reilly, and Pete Dunne. On the October 19 episode of NXT, Gargano turned face when he confronted NXT North American Champion Carmelo Hayes and Trick Williams. On the November 23 episode of NXT, Gargano faced Hayes and Pete Dunne in a triple threat match for the title, where Hayes retained due to interference from Tony D'Angelo. After the match, Gargano, Dunne, Ciampa, and LA Knight brawled with Hayes, D'Angelo, Bron Breakker and Grayson Waller, leading to a WarGames match at WarGames on December 5, where Team Black & Gold lost to Team 2.0. On the following episode of NXT, Gargano cut a farewell promo where he thanked his fans, friends, and family before being brutally attacked by Grayson Waller.

==== DIY reunion (2022–2025) ====
On the August 22, 2022, episode of Raw, Gargano returned to WWE after nine months to give a speech, but was interrupted and mocked by his former The Way stablemate Austin Theory, whom he superkicked afterwards. Two weeks later, on the September 12 episode of Raw, he defeated Chad Gable in his return match, but was attacked by Theory. On the October 3 episode of Raw, Gargano suffered his first main roster loss to Otis after Theory hit him with his Money in the Bank briefcase. He retaliated by defeating Theory on the following episode of Raw, ending their feud. At Royal Rumble on January 28, Gargano competed in his second rumble match where he lasted nearly 30 minutes before being eliminated by Dominik Mysterio and Finn Bálor. On the following episode of Raw, Gargano defeated Baron Corbin to qualify for the Elimination Chamber for the United States Championship. At Elimination Chamber on February 18, Gargano failed to win the title in the Elimination Chamber match. Gargano would return to NXT after over a year on the March 7, 2023, special episode of NXT: Roadblock after being introduced by Shawn Michaels as Grayson Waller's opponent for NXT Stand & Deliver, in which Gargano won.

After a five-month hiatus due to a shoulder injury, Gargano returned on the October 2 episode of Raw saving Tommaso Ciampa from an attack from Imperium, reforming DIY in the process. On the January 29, 2024 episode of Raw, DIY received a match for the Undisputed WWE Tag Team Championship against The Judgment Day's Damian Priest and Finn Bálor, but were defeated. On the March 18 episode of Raw, DIY defeated the Creed Brothers to qualify for the Six Pack Ladder Match for the Tag Team Championship at WrestleMania XL, which they were unsuccessful. On the April 15 episode of Raw, DIY defeated The New Day and the Creed Brothers to face Awesome Truth (The Miz and R-Truth) for the renamed World Tag Team Championship. On the April 22 episode of RAW, DIY was unsuccessful at winning the World Tag Team Championship from Awesome Truth.

On night 2 of the 2024 WWE Draft, both Gargano and Ciampa were drafted to SmackDown. On the July 5 episode of SmackDown, he and Ciampa became the new WWE Tag Team Champions by defeating A-Town Down Under (Austin Theory and Grayson Waller), having started a feud weeks prior to the title match. On the August 2 episode of SmackDown, DIY lost the titles to The Bloodline's Jacob Fatu and Tama Tonga after interference from Solo Sikoa and Tonga Loa, ending their reign at 28 days.

Over the next few months, DIY vowed to win back the titles, but there were signs of dissension between Ciampa and Gargano as the former took on a more aggressive character. On the November 15 episode of SmackDown, Ciampa interrupted a title match between The Street Profits (Angelo Dawkins and Montez Ford) and defending champions Motor City Machine Guns (Alex Shelley and Chris Sabin), attacking both teams, but Gargano restrained him. On the December 6 episode of SmackDown, DIY defeated Motor City Machine Guns to win the titles for the second time after Gargano hit Sabin with a low blow, and later revealing the recent arguments to all be a ruse, turning Gargano heel. At the Royal Rumble on February 1, DIY successfully defended the titles against Motor City Machine Guns in a 2 out of 3 falls match with interference from The Street Profits who attacked them after the match. On the February 21 episode of Smackdown, DIY's tag title match against Pretty Deadly ended in disqualification after The Street Profits got involved. On the March 14 episode of SmackDown, #DIY lost the titles to the Street Profits, ending their second reign at 98 days. On the April 25 episode of SmackDown, they would attempt to regain the titles against the Street Profits in a critically acclaimed tables, ladders, and chairs match also involving the Motor City Machine Guns, where the Street Profits retained.

==== Singles competition (2026–present) ====
On January 21, 2026, Ciampa announced he would not be renewing his contract when it expires, thus disbanding #DIY and leaving Gargano as a singles wrestler. After Ciampa's departure, Gargano began a storyline of being depressed and was often seen lying face down in various areas backstage for the next seven months. Gargano returned to the NXT brand on the March 24 episode of NXT, winning a Gauntlet Eliminator match to earn an NXT North American Championship opportunity against Myles Borne at Stand & Deliver, incidentally after Candice LeRae pushed Gargano to lie on Shiloh Hill and pin him for the victory. At the event on April 4, Gargano failed to win the title from Borne. On the September 4 episode of SmackDown, CM Punk offered an Undisputed WWE Championship match to Gargano, which Gargano stood up and accepted but was unsuccessful in capturing the title. After the match, his depression gimmick was dropped and he aligned himself with the new Undisputed WWE Champion Sami Zayn.

== Personal life ==
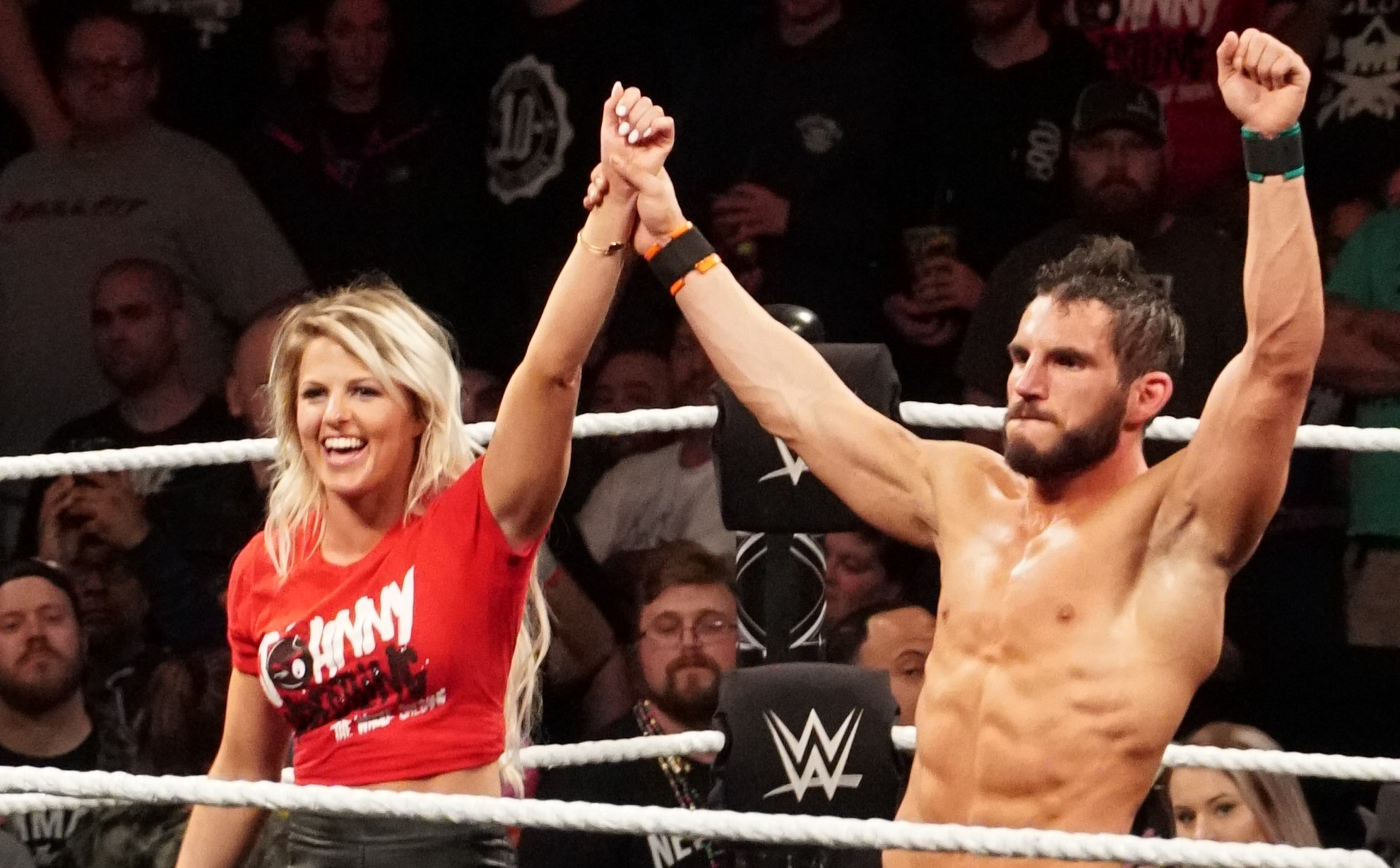
Gargano with his wife Candice LeRae in April 2018

Gargano's uncle, Walt Klasinski, is a professional wrestling promoter who owns the Northeastern Ohio-based independent promotion Pro Wrestling Ohio (PWO).

Gargano got engaged to fellow professional wrestler Candice LeRae Dawson in January 2016. The two got married on September 16, 2016. On August 12, 2021, the two announced that Candice was pregnant with their first child, a son named Quill Lewis Gargano, who was born on February 17, 2022.

Gargano cited Shawn Michaels, Chris Jericho, and Johnny Saint as his influences in professional wrestling.

Gargano is a self-admitted "humongous Browns fan". His 30th birthday celebration was held at their home field, FirstEnergy Stadium.

Gargano is a Marvel Comics and Star Wars fan, as shown in some of his ring gears being inspired by some of his favorite characters.

== Championships and accomplishments ==
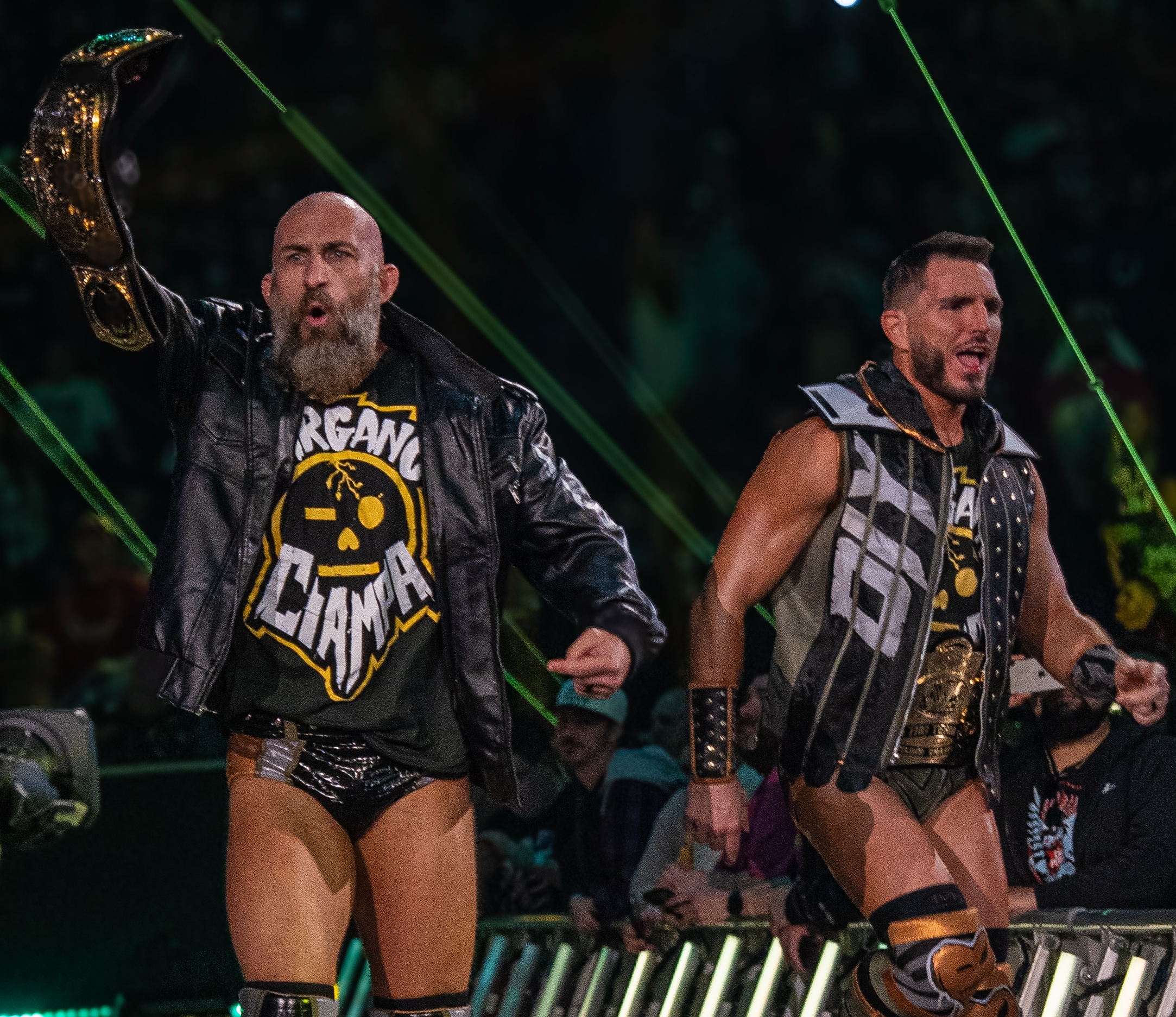
Gargano is a former two-time WWE Tag Team Champion (with Tommaso Ciampa (left)).

- Absolute Intense Wrestling
  - AIW Absolute Championship (1 time)
  - AIW Intense Championship (2 times)
  - Gauntlet for the Gold (2012)
  - Jack of All Trios (2010) – with Flip Kendrick and Louis Lyndon
- CBS Sports
  - Feud of the Year (2018) vs. Tommaso Ciampa
  - Feud of the Year (2019) vs. Adam Cole
  - Match of the Year (2019) vs. Adam Cole at NXT TakeOver: New York
  - NXT Match of the Year (2018) vs. Andrade Cien Almas at NXT TakeOver: Philadelphia
  - WWE Male Wrestler of the Year (2018)
- Championship Wrestling Experience
  - CWE Undisputed Championship (1 time)
- Chikara
  - Chikara Campeonatos de Parejas (2 times) – with Chuck Taylor
  - The Countdown Showdown (2010)
- Cleveland All–Pro Wrestling
  - CAPW Junior Heavyweight Championship (1 time)
- DDT Pro-Wrestling
  - Ironman Heavymetalweight Championship (1 time)
- Dragon Gate USA
  - Open the Freedom Gate Championship (2 times)
  - Open the United Gate Championship (1 time) – with Rich Swann
  - CITIC Cup (2014)
- Evolve
  - Evolve Tag Team Championship (1 time, inaugural) – with Drew Galloway
  - Evolve Tag Team Championship Tournament (2016) – with Drew Galloway
- International Wrestling Cartel
  - IWC Super Indy Championship (1 time)
  - IWC Tag Team Championship (1 time) – with Michael Facade
- Legacy Wrestling
  - Legacy Championship (1 time)
- Pro Wrestling Illustrated
  - Feud of the Year (2018) vs. Tommaso Ciampa
  - Feud of the Year (2019) vs. Adam Cole
  - Ranked No. 6 of the top 500 singles wrestlers in the PWI 500 in 2019
- Pro Wrestling Ohio/Prime Wrestling
  - PWO/Prime Heavyweight Championship (3 times)
- Smash Wrestling
  - Smash Wrestling Championship (1 time)
- Sports Illustrated
  - Ranked No. 9 of the top 10 men's wrestlers in 2018 – tied with Tommaso Ciampa
- Wrestling Cares Association
  - Race for the Ring Tournament (2014)
- Wrestling Observer Newsletter
  - Feud of the Year (2018) vs. Tommaso Ciampa
  - Feud of the Year (2019) vs. Adam Cole
- WWE
  - NXT Championship (1 time)
  - NXT North American Championship (3 times)
  - WWE Tag Team Championship (2 times) – with Tommaso Ciampa
  - NXT Tag Team Championship (1 time) – with Tommaso Ciampa
  - First NXT Triple Crown Champion
  - NXT Year-End Award (5 times)
    - Match of the Year (2016) – with Tommaso Ciampa vs. The Revival (Dash Wilder and Scott Dawson) in a two-out-of-three falls match for the NXT Tag Team Championship at NXT TakeOver: Toronto
    - Match of the Year (2018) – vs. Andrade Cien Almas for the NXT Championship at NXT TakeOver: Philadelphia (2018)
    - Match of the Year (2019) – vs. Adam Cole in a Two-out-of-three falls match for the vacant NXT Championship at NXT TakeOver: New York
    - Rivalry of the Year (2018) – vs. Tommaso Ciampa
    - Rivalry of the Year (2019) – vs. Adam Cole
