= Lars Sullivan =

American professional wrestler

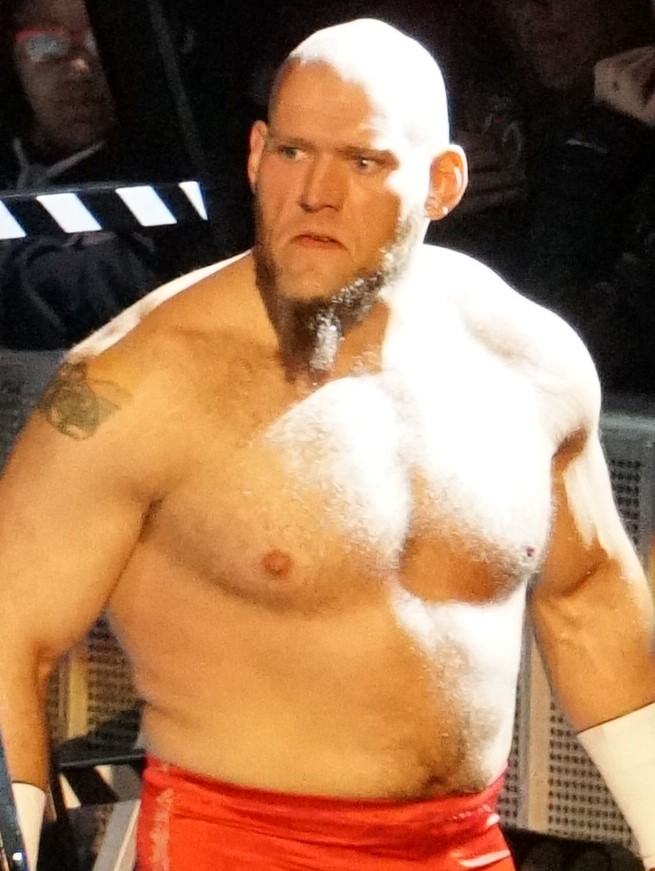
- Sullivan in April 2018

Personal information
- Born: Dylan Miley; July 6, 1988 (age 38) Westminster, Colorado, U.S.

Professional wrestling career
- Ring name(s): Dylan Miley; Lars Sullivan
- Billed height: 6 ft 3 in (191 cm)
- Billed weight: 330 lb (150 kg)
- Billed from: Rocky Mountains
- Trained by: WWE Performance Center
- Debut: March 29, 2015
- Retired: April 11, 2021

Dylan Miley (born July 6, 1988) is an American retired professional wrestler best known for his time in WWE under the ring name Lars Sullivan. He joined WWE in 2013 and spent several years training at the WWE Performance Center before making his debut on the NXT brand in April 2017. He made his main roster debut on Raw in April 2019, before being moved to SmackDown later that month. Following a tenure plagued by injuries, mental health issues, and the resurfacing of controversial online posts, he requested and was granted his release from WWE in early 2021.

== Professional wrestling career ==
=== WWE (2015–2021) ===
==== NXT (2015–2018) ====
Miley reported to the WWE Performance Center by October 2014. He wrestled his first recorded match on March 29, 2015, defeating Marcus Louis in a showcase match at WrestleMania Axxess. He then made sporadic appearances at NXT live events over the following two years. Miley made his television debut on the April 12, 2017 episode of NXT under his real name, teaming with Michael Blais in a loss to DIY. Following the match, Miley attacked Blais. In May 2017, he adopted the ring name Lars Sullivan. After several similar tag team appearances which resulted in him attacking his partner, Sullivan made his first appearance as a singles performer on the August 23 episode of NXT, attacking No Way Jose before a scheduled match. His first televised singles match and victory took place on the September 6 episode of NXT, defeating three jobbers in a three-on-one handicap match.

Following weeks of squash matches, Sullivan defeated Kassius Ohno at NXT TakeOver: WarGames on November 18, 2017. In December, he competed in a tournament to determine NXT Champion Andrade Cien Almas' opponent for NXT TakeOver: Philadelphia that was won by Johnny Gargano. At NXT TakeOver: New Orleans on April 7, 2018, Sullivan took part in a six-man ladder match for the NXT North American Championship, which was won by Adam Cole. Sullivan wrestled his final televised NXT match on June 16, 2018 at NXT TakeOver: Chicago II, unsuccessfully challenging NXT Champion Aleister Black; the loss marked his first pinfall defeat in NXT.

==== Main roster (2018–2021) ====
In November 2018, vignettes began airing for Sullivan's main roster debut on both Raw and SmackDown. He was scheduled to appear on Raw on January 14, 2019, but reportedly walked out due to an anxiety attack. On the April 8 episode of Raw, Sullivan made his debut by attacking Kurt Angle, who had retired at WrestleMania 35 the previous night. Pushed as a monstrous villain by WWE, he went on to attack high-profile wrestlers such as Rey Mysterio and The Hardy Boyz (Jeff Hardy and Matt Hardy). As part of the Superstar Shake-up on April 16, he moved to the SmackDown brand. He began feuding with Lucha House Party (Kalisto, Gran Metalik, and Lince Dorado), defeating them via disqualification in a three-on-one handicap match at Super ShowDown. During a rematch with Lucha House Party on the June 10 episode of Raw, he sustained a severe knee injury with a predicted recovery time of six to nine months.

Sullivan returned on the October 9, 2020 episode of SmackDown, attacking Jeff Hardy, Matt Riddle, and The Miz. On the October 23 episode of SmackDown, he defeated Shorty G in what would be Sullivan's final match in WWE. In January 2021, Miley was quietly released from his WWE contract after being removed from programming. It was revealed by Miley that he had asked for his release after informing WWE that he was done with pro wrestling due to his ongoing anxiety issues. In an interview conducted with Fightful on February 3, 2021, Miley stated that he is "likely done" with professional wrestling.

== Personal life ==
In May 2019, it was revealed that Miley had used multiple accounts on the Bodybuilding.com forum to write what Sports Illustrated described as "a slew of racist, sexist, homophobic, and otherwise offensive posts" between 2007 and 2013. Some of the posts were directed towards WWE employees and were written after Miley had joined WWE. Paste wrote that the posts showed "a long history of repeated behavior" and noted that some of them had insulted foreigners and the mentally ill. In response to the accusations, Miley stated, "There is no excuse for the inappropriate remarks that I made years ago. They do not reflect my personal beliefs nor who I am today, and I apologize to anyone I offended." He was fined $100,000 by WWE and required to complete sensitivity training.

In December 2019, it was reported that Miley had performed in gay pornography under the name Mitch Bennett in 2009.

== Championships and accomplishments ==
- Pro Wrestling Illustrated
  - Ranked No. 84 of the top 500 singles wrestlers in the PWI 500 in 2018
