= Velveteen Dream =

American professional wrestler (born 1995)

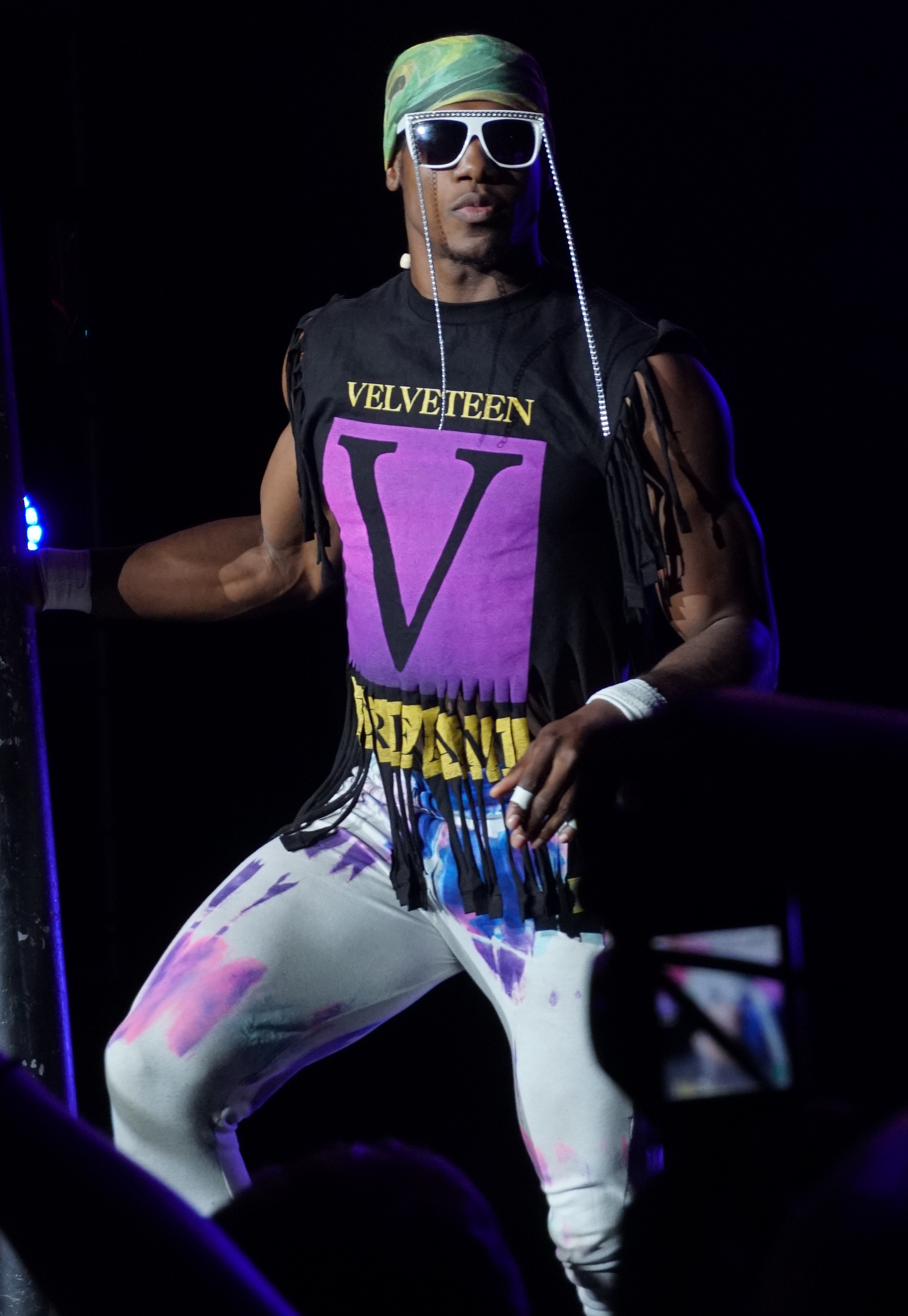
- Dream in 2018

Personal information
- Born: Patrick Clark Jr. August 19, 1995 (age 31) Washington, D.C., U.S.

Professional wrestling career
- Ring name(s): Patrick Clark; Velveteen Man; Rick Powers; Slugger Clark; Velveteen Dream
- Billed height: 6 ft 2 in (188 cm)
- Billed weight: 227 lb (103 kg)
- Billed from: Capitol Hill, Washington, D.C.
- Trained by: MCW Pro Wrestling; WWE Performance Center
- Debut: October 3, 2014

Patrick Clark Jr. (born August 19, 1995) is an American professional wrestler. He currently performs for MCW Pro Wrestling under his real name. He is best known for his time in WWE, where he performed under the ring name Velveteen Dream from 2015 to 2021 and was a former one-time NXT North American Champion.

Clark began his career in 2014, training and debuting in MCW Pro Wrestling. During his time there, he won the MCW Tag Team Championship with Lio Rush. After competing in several other independent promotions, he participated in the 2015 WWE reality show Tough Enough, a series focused on finding new wrestlers. He did not win the contest, but was signed to a developmental contract and was assigned to NXT, WWE's farm territory.

In May 2017, Clark debuted a new Prince-inspired gimmick on NXT called Velveteen Dream, becoming popular and winning the NXT North American Championship once. After a long period of inactivity, he was released from WWE in May 2021.

== Early life ==
Patrick Clark Jr. was born on August 19, 1995 in Washington, D.C.

== Professional wrestling career ==
=== Early career (2014–2015) ===
Clark trained as a professional wrestler at the MCW Pro Wrestling training center under Patrick Brink. He made his debut for the promotion after four months of training on October 3, 2014, under the ring name Rick Powers. Clark went on to wrestle for MCW, winning the MCW Tag Team Championship with Lio Rush in October 2015. He briefly used the ring name Slugger Clark before settling on his real name in February 2016. In addition to working for MCW, Clark appeared with various American independent promotions throughout 2015 including Combat Zone Wrestling and World Xtreme Wrestling.

=== WWE (2015–2021) ===
==== Tough Enough and training (2015–2017) ====
Clark was selected as a contestant for the sixth season of the WWE reality television program WWE Tough Enough, which began airing in June 2015. Despite being tapped as one of the favorites to win the competition, he was eliminated in the fifth episode due to a perceived lack of humility, placing ninth overall in the series.

On October 17, 2015, it was reported that Clark had signed a developmental contract with WWE. He made his in-ring debut for the company at a NXT live event in Lakeland, Florida on February 5, 2016, losing to Riddick Moss. He made his television debut on the May 24th episode of NXT, beating Robert Anthony. On the October 19 episode of NXT, Clark confronted and challenged NXT Champion Shinsuke Nakamura but was attacked and beaten down by Nakamura. Clark returned and had his first televised victory on the March 1, 2017 episode of NXT, defeating Sean Maluta.

==== NXT North American Champion (2017–2019) ====
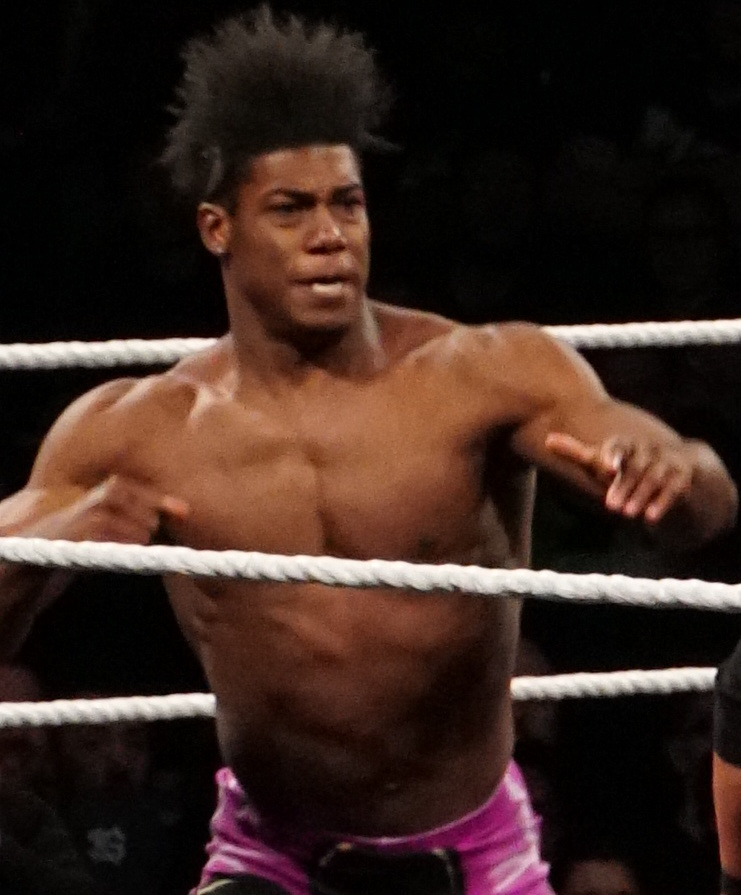
Dream in 2018

On the May 3, 2017 episode of NXT, Clark started appearing in weekly vignettes, debuting a new Prince-inspired character called Velveteen Dream. He made his debut as a heel on the May 24 episode of NXT, defeating Robert Anthony. On the September 20 episode of NXT, Dream interrupted Aleister Black, where he constantly stalked and harassed Black in order for him to acknowledge Dream and say his name. This led to a match at NXT TakeOver: WarGames, where Dream lost, and Black would end up acknowledging and saying Dream's name. On the December 6 episode of NXT, Dream was supposed to face Kassius Ohno in a qualifying match for a number one contender's fatal-four-way match for the NXT Championship; however, an injury kept Dream out of competition, and he was replaced by Johnny Gargano, who defeated Ohno and later won the fatal-four way to become the number one contender.

On the January 10, 2018 episode of NXT, Dream interrupted Gargano to mock him for taking 20 minutes to defeat Ohno, claiming that he could've beaten him in "30 seconds tops." On the January 24 episode of NXT, Dream was confronted backstage by Ohno, who pushed him into a wall, starting a feud. At NXT TakeOver: Philadelphia, Dream defeated Ohno. During the rest of 2018, Dream participated in several TakeOver events, such as at NXT TakeOver: New Orleans, Dream competed in the ladder match for the inaugural NXT North American Championship (which was won by Adam Cole) at NXT TakeOver: Chicago II, he was defeated by Ricochet, and at NXT TakeOver: Brooklyn IV, he defeated EC3.

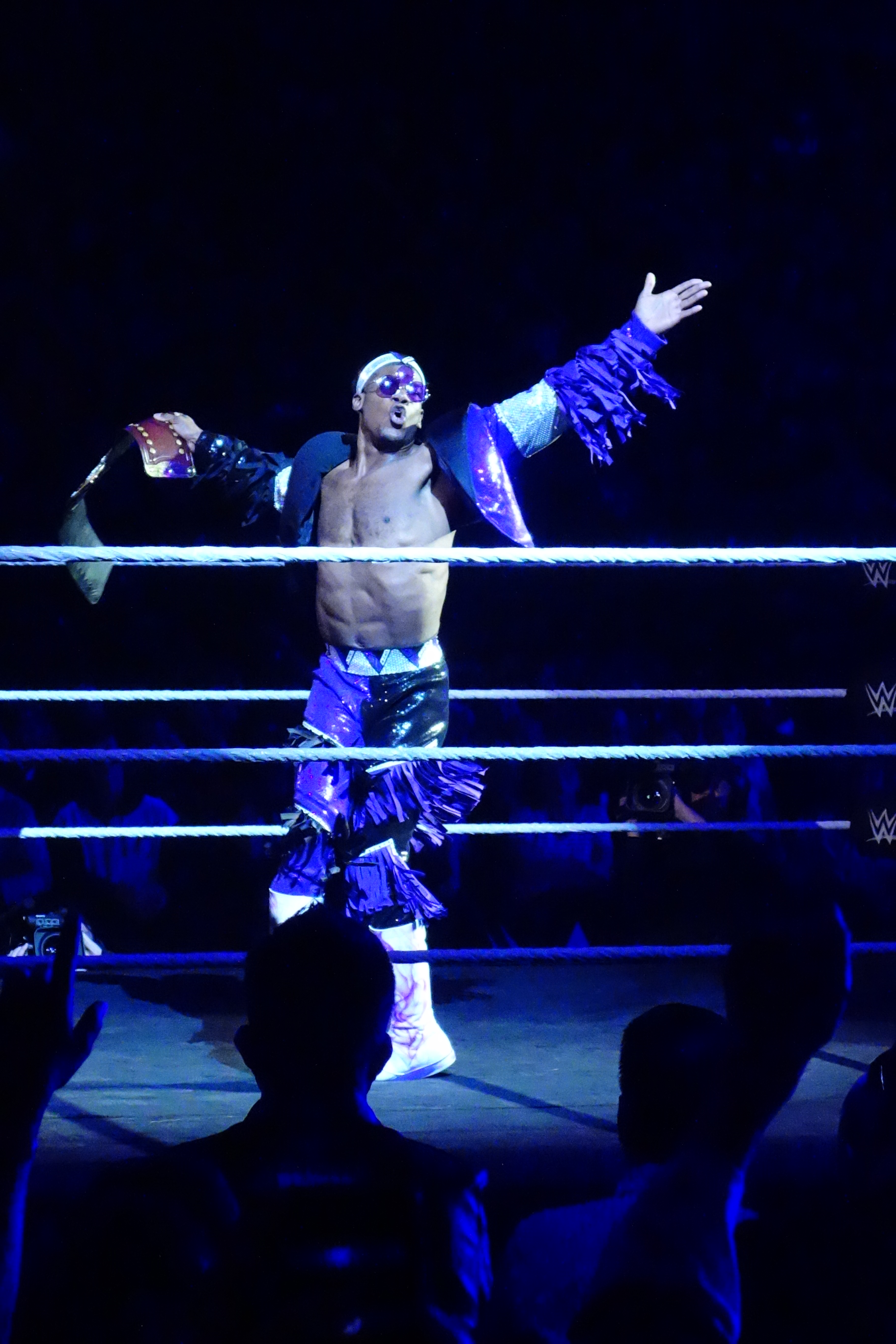
Dream during his reign as NXT North American Champion

On the September 26 episode of NXT, Dream began a feud with NXT Champion Tommaso Ciampa after Dream accused him of attacking Aleister Black, thus turning face in the process. At NXT TakeOver: WarGames on November 17, he failed to capture the NXT Championship from Ciampa. On February 2, 2019, at Royal Rumble Axxess, Dream entered the 2019 Worlds Collide tournament, in which he defeated Tony Nese in the first round, Humberto Carrillo in the quarterfinals, Jordan Devlin in the semifinals, and Tyler Bate in the final to earn a future singles championship match of his choice on the NXT or NXT UK brands.

Dream chose to challenge for the NXT North American Championship, held by Johnny Gargano. On the February 20 episode of NXT, Dream defeated Gargano to win the title, marking his first championship win in WWE. At NXT TakeOver: New York, Dream defeated Matt Riddle to retain the championship, handing Riddle his first loss in NXT. In the following weeks, he went on to successfully defend the title against challengers including Buddy Murphy, Tyler Breeze, Roderick Strong, and Pete Dunne. On the September 18 episode of NXT, he lost the title to Roderick Strong after interference from The Undisputed Era, ending his reign at 231 days. Dream's single reign was the longest at the time until it was broken by Wes Lee's reign at 269 days in 2023.

==== Final storylines (2020–2021) ====
After taking time off due to a back injury, he returned on the February 5, 2020 episode of NXT to attack The Undisputed Era. At NXT TakeOver: In Your House, Dream challenged Adam Cole for the NXT Championship in a Backlot Brawl, but ended up unsuccessful, and due to a pre-match stipulation, Dream could no longer challenge for the title while Cole was still champion. Following several months off after an injury related to a car accident, Dream returned on the August 12 episode of NXT, where he lost to Cameron Grimes in a triple threat match also involving Kushida. After the match, Dream attacked Kushida, thus turning heel in the process. The following week on NXT, he defeated Finn Bálor to qualify for a spot in a ladder match for the vacated NXT North American Championship at NXT TakeOver XXX. At the event, Dream failed to win the title. At NXT TakeOver 31, Dream was defeated by Kushida. On the December 23 episode of NXT, Dream was defeated by Adam Cole in what would be his final WWE match and appearance. On May 20, 2021, Dream was released from his WWE contract after five months of inactivity.

=== Independent circuit (2024–present) ===
On February 18, 2024, Clark made his return to wrestling after over 3 years for the promotion The Dynasty in a surprise appearance, now going by Velveteen Man, a tweaked version of his WWE ring name. His successful return match at Dynasty: It Was All A Dream in which he defeated Alec Odin marked the final use of his WWE NXT ring name.

On September 21, 2024 in a homecoming to his former training promotion, Patrick Clark returned to MCW at the September Slam live event defeating "The Afro Samurai" Tony Macko. During early October 2024, he enjoyed successful singles victories during the two-night MCW Autumn Armageddon live events.

== In media ==
As Velveteen Dream, Clark is a playable character in the video games WWE Mayhem, WWE Universe, WWE Champions, WWE SuperCard, WWE 2K19, and WWE 2K20.

== Personal life ==
As of 2025, Clark resides on a family farm in rural Virginia where he lives with his dog and works with his cousin in a black garlic business.

=== Sexual abuse allegations and legal issues ===
In April 2020, Clark was accused of sending indecent images to underage boys on Instagram after a Reddit user posted screenshots of what appeared to be a naked Clark on the SquaredCircle subreddit, though Clark denied the allegations. Two months later, amidst the Speaking Out movement, new allegations were made that Clark sent a sexually explicit photo to an underage girl and had "inappropriate communications" with underage boys he was allegedly grooming. WWE reportedly investigated the incident but found no evidence of wrongdoing.

In August 2022, Clark was arrested twice in Florida. On August 20, he was arrested on charges of first-degree battery and trespassing on property after a warning, to which he pleaded not guilty. He was arrested again six days later on charges of possessing drug paraphernalia. The battery and trespassing charges were dropped the following month.

== Exhibition boxing record ==
1 fight	0 wins	1 loss
By disqualification	0	1

No.	Result	Record	Opponent	Type	Round, time	Date	Location	Notes
1	Loss	0–1	Ryan Pownall	DQ	2 (4), 1:59	29 Aug 2026	Kia Center, Orlando, Florida, U.S.	

== Championships and accomplishments ==
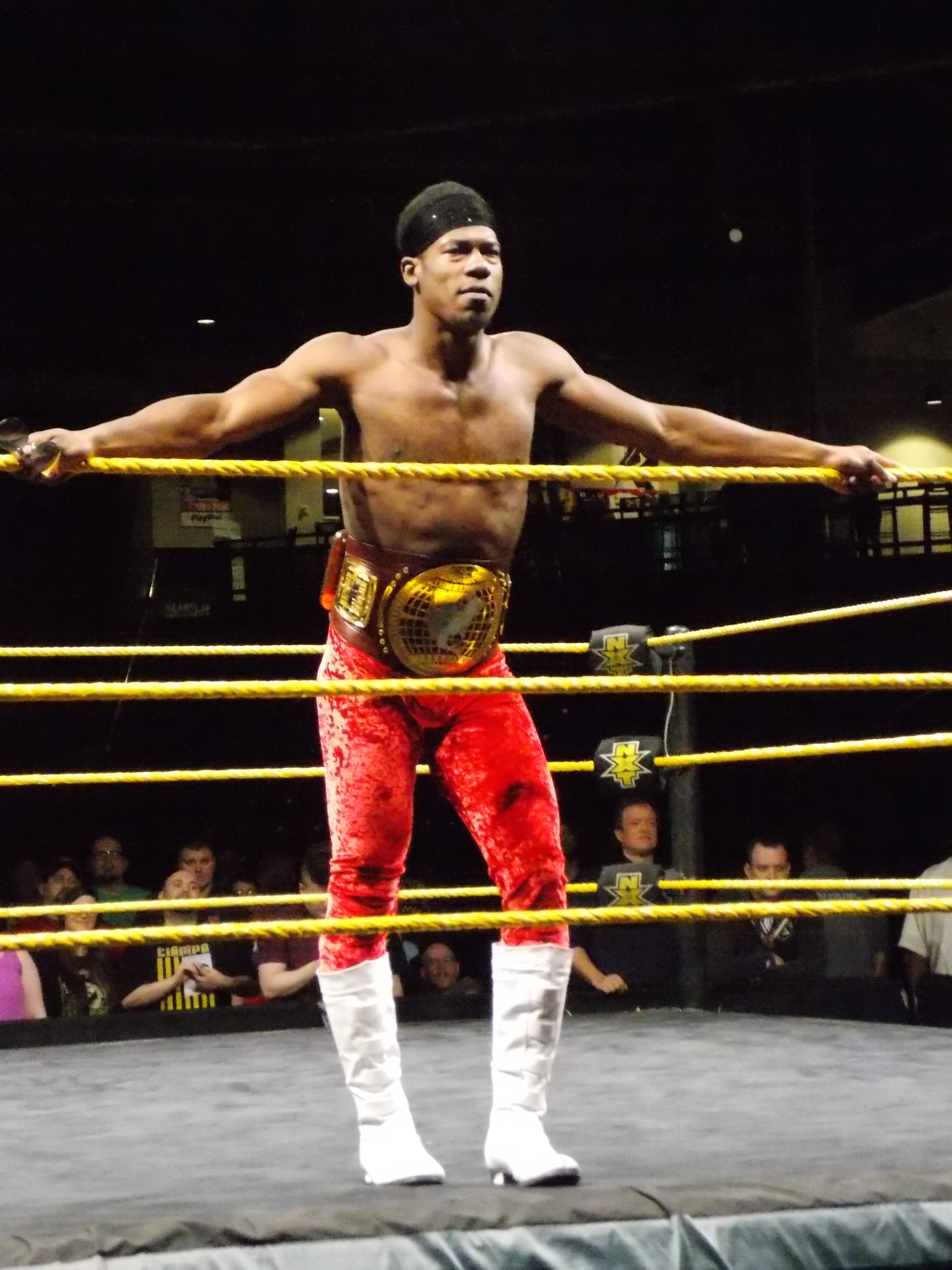
Velveteen Dream is a former NXT North American Champion.

- Maryland Championship Wrestling
  - MCW Heavyweight Championship (1 time, current)
  - MCW Tag Team Championship (1 time) – with Lio Rush
- Pro Wrestling Illustrated
  - Most Improved Wrestler of the Year (2018)
  - Ranked No. 26 of the top 500 singles wrestlers in the PWI 500 in 2019
- Wrestling Observer Newsletter
  - Best Gimmick (2018)
- WWE
  - NXT North American Championship (1 time)
  - NXT Year-End Award for Rivalry of the Year (2017) – vs Aleister Black
  - Worlds Collide (2019)
