= Adam Cole =

American professional wrestler (born 1989)

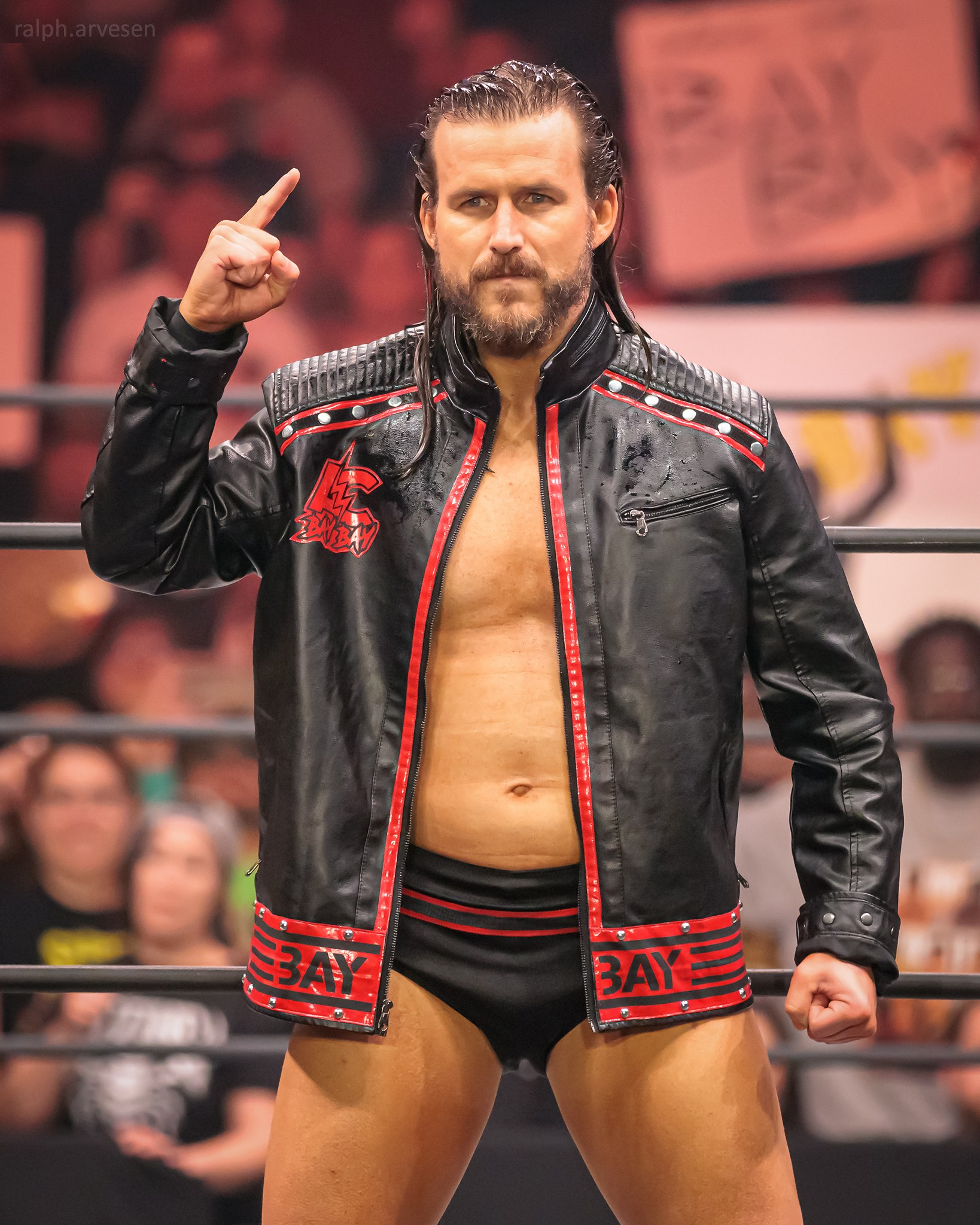
- Cole in 2022

Personal information
- Born: Austin Kirk Jenkins; July 5, 1989 (age 37) Lancaster, Pennsylvania, U.S.

Professional wrestling career
- Ring name(s): Adam Carelle; Adam Cole
- Billed height: 6ft 0in (1.8m)
- Billed weight: 200 lb (91 kg)
- Billed from: Panama City, Florida
- Trained by: Al Snow; D. J. Hyde; Jon Dahmer; Les Thatcher; Shawn Michaels
- Debut: April 26, 2008

Twitch information
- Channel: TheCHUGS
- Years active: 2016–present
- Genre: Gaming
- Followers: 146K

YouTube information
- Channel: TheCHUGS
- Years active: 2020–present
- Genre: Gaming
- Subscribers: 71.5 thousand
- Views: 3.41 million
- Last updated: September 11, 2026

Austin Kirk Jenkins (born July 5, 1989), known by the ring name Adam Cole, is an American professional wrestler. He is signed to All Elite Wrestling (AEW), where he is the leader of The Paragon. He is also known for his tenures with WWE and Ring of Honor (ROH).

Cole began his eight-year tenure with ROH in 2009 and went on to become the first-ever three-time ROH World Champion. In addition, he is a one-time ROH World Television Champion, and the winner of the 2014 ROH Survival of the Fittest tournament. Cole has also wrestled for several independent promotions, including Chikara, Combat Zone Wrestling (CZW), where he is a former CZW World Junior Heavyweight Champion, and Pro Wrestling Guerrilla (PWG), where he is a former PWG World Champion; he holds the records for longest reigns for both titles. He also worked in New Japan Pro-Wrestling (NJPW), where he was part of the Bullet Club stable.

From 2017 to 2021, Cole was signed to WWE and performed on their NXT brand. During this time, Cole was the leader of The Undisputed Era, whose membership included Bobby Fish, Kyle O'Reilly, and later Roderick Strong. Cole was the second wrestler to become the NXT Triple Crown Champion, having been the inaugural NXT North American Champion, a one-time NXT Tag Team Champion, and is the longest-reigning NXT Champion of all time. After Cole's WWE contract expired, he joined AEW in September 2021. During his tenure there, he has won the AEW TNT Championship once and was the inaugural winner of the Owen Hart Cup in 2022. Between WWE and AEW, he has headlined several pay-per-view events.

== Early life ==
Austin Jenkins was born on July 5, 1989, in Lancaster, Pennsylvania, and raised in nearby Manheim. He has a younger brother. His parents separated when he was 10 years old. Jenkins took karate lessons as a child. Jenkins competed in wrestling at Manheim Central High School before quitting his senior year so he could get a job to pay for his professional wrestling training.

== Professional wrestling career ==
=== Early career (2008–2010) ===
Jenkins wrestled his first amtch on April 26, 2008 losing to Tsunami at American Championship Pro Wrestling in Springfield, Pennsylvania. His first victory was defeatign Alex Colon on May 31, 2008 at Eastern Wrestling Alliance in Baltimore.

=== Combat Zone Wrestling (2008–2013) ===
Jenkins was trained at the Combat Zone Wrestling (CZW) Wrestling Academy by D. J. Hyde and Jon Dahmer. He became an official student at the Academy on November 14, 2007, while he was still a senior in high school. He made his CZW debut at No Pun Intended as Adam Cole on June 21, 2008, when he teamed with The Reason in a loss to GNC (Joe Gacy and Alex Colon).

In 2009, Cole teamed regularly with Tyler Veritas and they won a tag team gauntlet match, outlasting the teams of The S.A.T., L.J. Cruz and Izzy Kensington, 2.0, All Money Is Legal, and GNC at X: Decade of Destruction – 10th Anniversary in February. At the following show in March, they won a four-way match against the team of Jagged and Cole Calloway, GNC, and Team AnDrew (Andy Sumner and Drew Gulak). After Cole took a hiatus from CZW, he returned at A Tangled Web 2 on August 8, where he and Veritas won another four-way match against BLKOUT, Team Macktion (TJ Mack and Kirby Mack), and The Spanish Armada (Alex Colon and L.J. Cruz). At Down With the Sickness Forever on September 13, Cole and Veritas challenged for The Best Around (Bruce Maxwell and TJ Cannon) for the CZW World Tag Team Championship, but were unsuccessful. For the remainder of 2009, Cole and Veritas began focusing on singles competition, as they both entered the tournament to determine the inaugural CZW Wired TV Champion, with Cole defeating Alex Colon and Rich Swann en route to the final at Cage of Death 11, where he lost to Veritas.

Cole posing against the ropes in 2010

At Walking on Pins and Needles in March 2010, Cole wrestled Sabian to a 15-minute time-limit draw. Later in 2010, Cole began challenging for the CZW World Junior Heavyweight Championship and on April 10 at Swinging for the Fences, Cole faced defending champion Sabian in a match that ended in a 20-minute time-limit draw. On May 8, 2010, Cole won the CZW World Junior Heavyweight Championship by defeating defending champion Sabian and Ruckus in a three-way match at Fist Fight. Cole successfully defended the championship against Ryan Slater in both June and August and Blk Jeez in September. At It's Always Bloody in Philadelphia on October 9, Cole turned into a heel (villainous character) by attacking long-time tag team partner Veritas and successfully defended the CZW World Junior Heavyweight Championship against AR Fox later that night. In November, Cole toured Germany with CZW and he retained the championship against Zack Sabre Jr. at Live in Germany in Oberhausen. In December, Cole gained Mia Yim as a manager and she helped him to retain the Junior Heavyweight Championship in two separate matches at Cage of Death XII.

At Twelve: Anniversary in February 2011, Cole qualified for the Best of the Best X tournament by defeating Pinkie Sanchez. On April 9 at Best of the Best X, Cole qualified for the final of the tournament by defeating Johnny Gargano and Kyle O'Reilly in a three-way match in the first round and Sabre in the semi-final, then defeating Sami Callihan in the final, thus winning the Best of the Best X tournament. Cole then developed an alliance with his trainer D. J. Hyde, with Hyde helping Cole to retain the championship against Fox in May. Further title defenses against Jonatham Gresham, Chuck Taylor and AJ Curcio followed throughout the year. On November 12, Cole lost the CZW World Junior Heavyweight Championship to Callihan despite both Hyde and Yim interfering on his behalf, ending his reign at 553 days, the longest reign in the championship's history.

At An Excellent Adventure in January 2012, Cole unsuccessfully challenged Devon Moore for the CZW World Heavyweight Championship. Cole's alliance with Hyde ended at the Best of the Best 11 internet pay-per-view, when Hyde gained a new protégé in Tony Nese who Cole went on to defeat in a match. Cole and Hyde began feuding briefly, with Hyde attacking Cole in May and Cole attacking Hyde the following month. In November 2012, Cole went on to feud with Callihan, claiming that he would always be regarded as a better wrestler than Callihan. At Cage of Death 14: Shattered Dreams on December 8, Cole defeated Callihan in a No Hold Barred match. On April 13, 2013, Cole defeated Callihan in what billed as the "final encounter" between the longtime rivals.

=== Independent circuit (2010–2017) ===
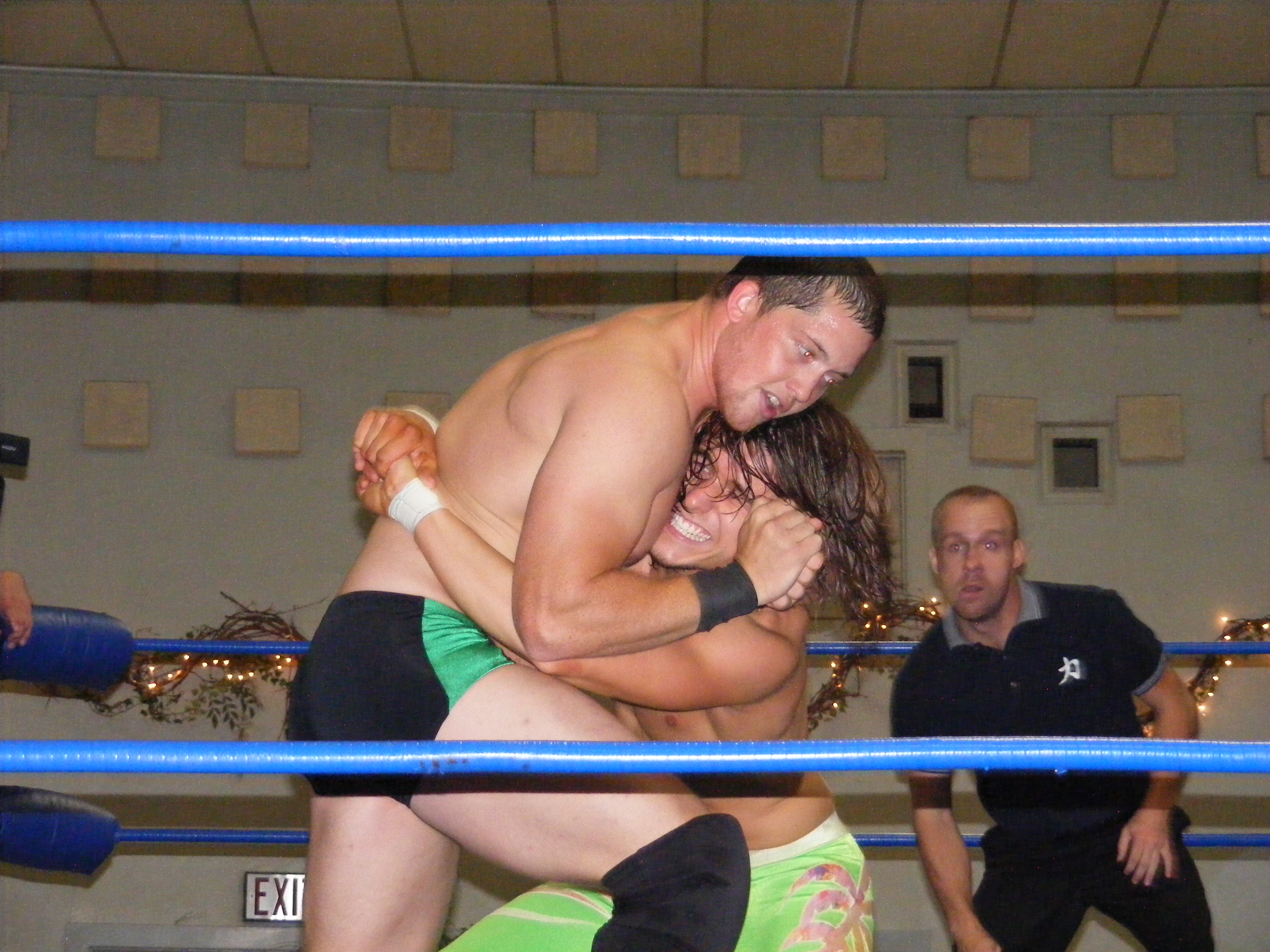
Cole (right) wrestling Kyle O'Reilly (left) in their quarter-final match at Chikara's 2010 Young Lions Cup tournament

Cole began competing for the Evolve promotion in 2010, making his debut match for the promotion on May 1 at Evolve 3: Rise Or Fall, he lost to Sami Callihan. At Evolve 4, Cole defeated Johnny Gargano to improve his record to one win and one loss. Following his victory he challenged Jimmy Jacobs to a match at the next show. At Evolve 5: Danielson vs. Sawa, Cole lost to Jacobs.

Cole appeared at Dragon Gate USA's (DGUSA) Open the Freedom Gate pay-per-view taping on November 28, 2009, on the pre-show, where he wrestled Kyle O'Reilly in a losing effort. On July 24, 2010, Cole appeared at DGUSA's Enter the Dragon 2010 pay-per-view taping in a four-way match against Chuck Taylor, Arik Cannon, and Ricochet, which was won by Taylor.

On August 28, 2010, Cole appeared at Chikara's Young Lions Cup tournament. He defeated Kyle O'Reilly in the quarter-finals, but was eliminated from the semi-final six-man elimination match by Obariyon.

=== Ring of Honor (2009–2017) ===
==== Future Shock (2009–2012) ====
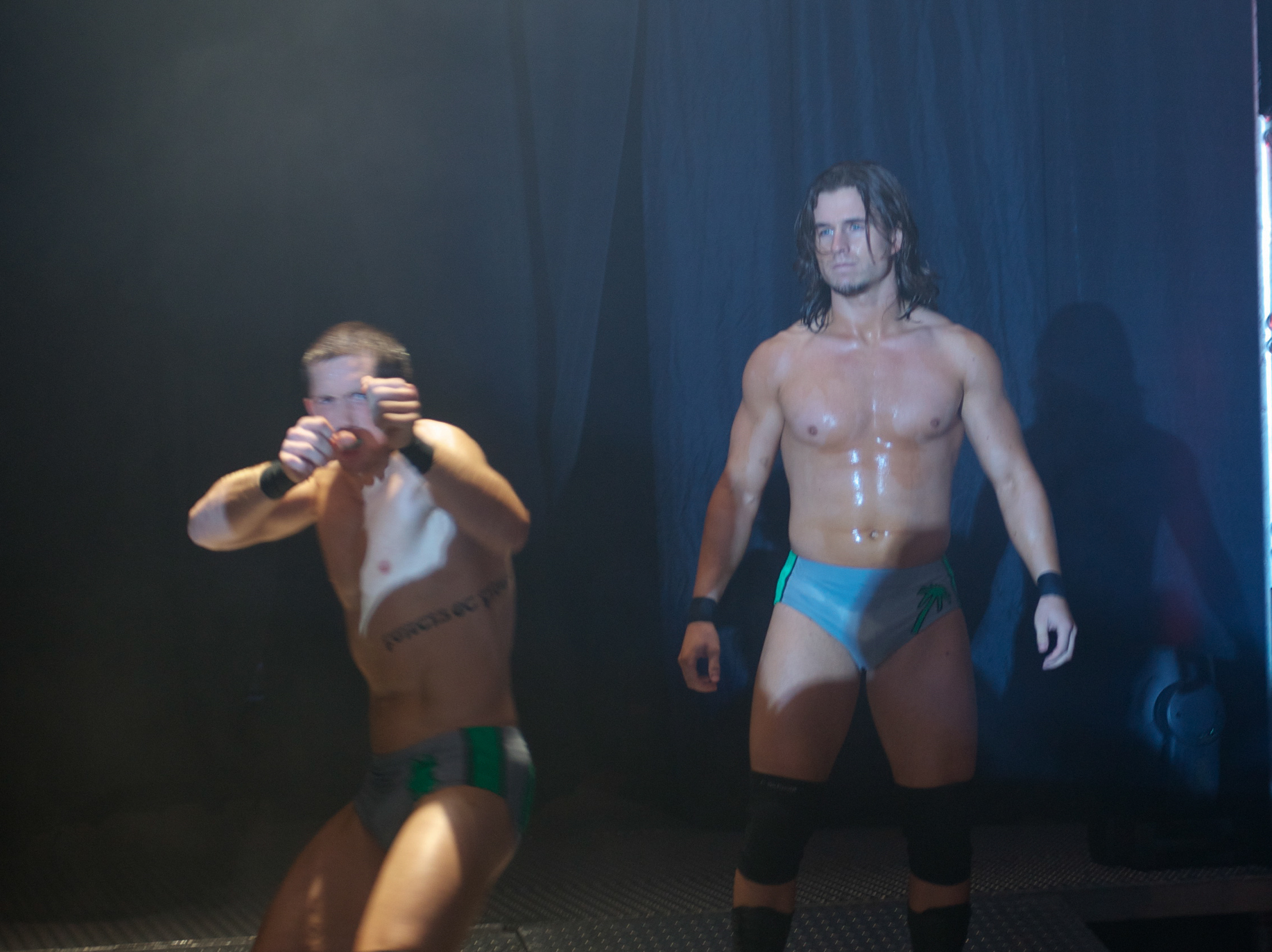
Future Shock: Kyle O'Reilly (left) and Cole (right) at a Ring of Honor show in August 2011

Cole made his Ring of Honor (ROH) debut on February 28, 2009, when he lost to John Kerman in a dark match at the Ring of Honor Wrestling tapings. At the Ring of Honor Wrestling tapings the following night, Cole appeared in a dark match again, teaming with Ninja Brown against John Kerman and Corey Abbott. The match ended in a no contest when the Dark City Fight Club (Kory Chavis and Jon Davis) attacked the match participants. He appeared again on the July 26, 2010, episode of Ring of Honor Wrestling, teaming with Nick Westgate in a loss to the Kings of Wrestling (Chris Hero and Claudio Castagnoli).

On August 23, 2010, ROH announced that Cole had signed a contract with the company. At the August 2 tapings of Ring of Honor Wrestling, Cole was defeated by Mike Bennett. Cole began to ally himself with fellow ROH newcomer Kyle O'Reilly, with the pair forming a tag team. At the October 2 Ring of Honor Wrestling tapings they defeated the team of Grizzly Redwood and Mike Sydal. They lost to Steve Corino and Kevin Steen on October 15, and The All Night Express (Kenny King and Rhett Titus) at a show on October 16. They defeated the Bravado Brothers (Harlem Bravado and Lance Bravado) on the November 8 episode of Ring of Honor Wrestling. On November 12, Cole participated in the 2010 edition of the Survival of the Fittest tournament. He defeated Steve Corino in the first round, but was the second person eliminated from the final, a six-man elimination match. The following night in Toronto, Cole and O'Reilly defeated the Bravado Brothers. Cole made his ROH pay-per-view debut on December 18 at Final Battle, where he and O'Reilly were defeated by the All Night Express. On April 1 and 2 at Chapter One and Two of Honor Takes Center Stage, Cole and O'Reilly faced the Briscoe Brothers (Jay Briscoe and Mark Briscoe) and the Kings of Wrestling in two losing efforts, despite putting on strong performances. On July 8, Cole and O'Reilly defeated the Bravado Brothers to earn a future shot at the ROH World Tag Team Championship. On July 25, ROH announced that Cole had re-signed with the promotion. At the August 13 tapings of Ring of Honor Wrestling, the tag team of Cole and O'Reilly was named Future Shock.

==== Championship reigns (2012–2015) ====
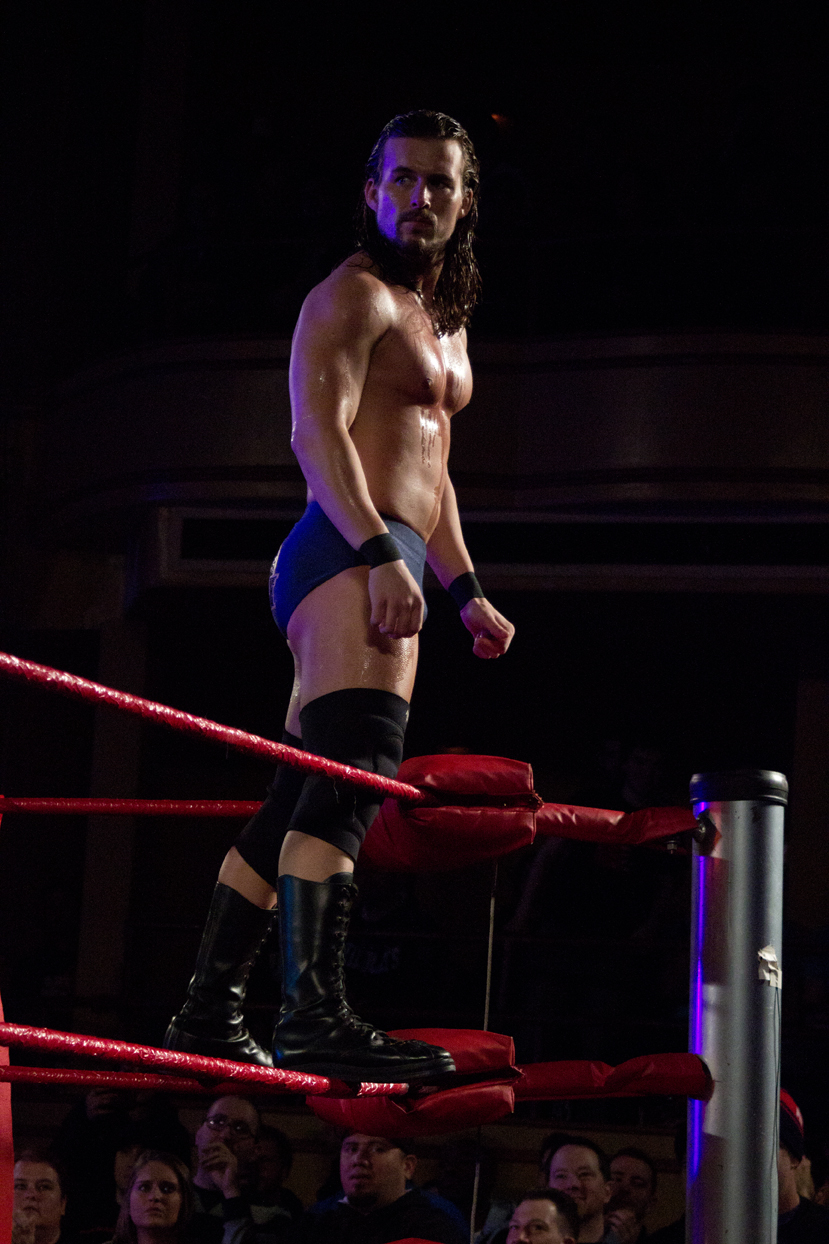
Cole at Supercard of Honor VII in April 2013

At the January 7, 2012, tapings of Ring of Honor Wrestling, Future Shock disbanded and Cole formed a new partnership with Eddie Edwards, opposite Kyle O'Reilly and Davey Richards. On March 4 at the 10th Anniversary Show, Cole and Edwards defeated O'Reilly and Richards in a main event tag team match, with Cole pinning Richards, the reigning ROH World Champion, for the win. On June 24 at Best in the World: Hostage Crisis, Cole defeated O'Reilly in a "Hybrid Rules" match. Afterwards, Cole tried to make peace with his former partner, but the offer was turned down. On June 29, 2012, Cole won his first championship in ROH, defeating Roderick Strong to become the ROH World Television Champion in Baltimore, Maryland, at a taping of Ring of Honor Wrestling. On September 15 at Death Before Dishonor X: State of Emergency, Cole successfully defended the title against Mike Mondo, before being confronted by Matt Hardy. At the following internet pay-per-view, Glory By Honor XI: The Unbreakable Hope on October 13, Cole successfully defended his title against Eddie Edwards. On December 16 at Final Battle: Doomsday, Cole was defeated by Hardy in a non-title match. At the following iPPV, 11th Anniversary Show on March 2, 2013, Cole lost the World Television Championship to Matt Taven, ending his reign at 246 days. On May 4 at Border Wars, Cole unsuccessfully challenged Jay Briscoe for the ROH World Championship. On May 30, ROH announced that Cole had re-signed with the promotion.

After the ROH World Championship was vacated, Cole entered a tournament to determine the new champion, defeating Mark Briscoe in his first round match on July 27. On August 3, Cole defeated Jay Lethal to advance to the semifinals of the tournament. On September 20 at Death Before Dishonor XI, Cole first defeated Tommaso Ciampa in the semifinals and then Michael Elgin in the finals to win the tournament and become the new ROH World Champion. After being presented the title belt by former champion Jay Briscoe, Cole attacked Briscoe and Elgin thus establishing himself as a villain. In early November, Cole suffered a concussion, temporarily sidelining him from wrestling. On December 14 at Final Battle, Cole successfully defended the ROH World Championship in a three-way match against Briscoe and Elgin, following outside interference from Matt Hardy, with the two later forming a stable alongside Mike Bennett, Maria Kanellis and later Matt Taven, named The Kingdom. Post-match, Cole and Hardy were attacked by the returning Chris Hero, which led to Cole's next title defense on February 21, 2014, at the 12th Anniversary Show, where he defeated Hero. A rematch between the two, contested under Ringmaster's Challenge rules, took place on March 8 and saw Cole again retain the title.

On April 4 at Supercard of Honor VIII, Cole defeated Jay Briscoe in a ladder match to become the undisputed ROH World Champion, retaining his title and taking over Briscoe's unrecognized "Real World Title" and later giving it to Matt Hardy who renamed it the "ROH Iconic Championship". In May 2014, Cole took part in a tour co-produced by ROH and New Japan Pro-Wrestling (NJPW), during which he made two more successful title defenses; first against Kevin Steen at Global Wars on May 10 and then against NJPW's Jyushin Thunder Liger at War of the Worlds on May 17. The following month, Cole retained the championship against ACH and Tommaso Ciamapa. On June 22 at Best in the World, Cole lost the ROH World Championship to Michael Elgin, ending his reign at 275 days. Through ROH's relationship with NJPW, Cole made his Japanese debut on August 10, in Tokorozawa, Saitama, teaming with Kingdom stablemate Michael Bennett to defeat Captain New Japan and Jyushin Thunder Liger in a tag team match. On November 8, Cole won the 2014 Survival of the Fittest. On December 7 at Final Battle, Cole unsuccessfully challenged Jay Briscoe for the ROH World Championship in a Fight Without Honor. The following week, Cole announced he had suffered a shoulder injury, which required surgery.

Cole returned from his injury on May 12, 2015, at War of the Worlds '15, losing to A.J. Styles. Cole then began having problems with his Kingdom stablemates and started teasing a reunion with his Future Shock tag team partner Kyle O'Reilly. However, on September 18 at All Star Extravaganza VII, Cole turned on O'Reilly during his match for the ROH World Championship and reunited with the rest of the Kingdom, becoming a heel once again.

==== Bullet Club (2016–2017) ====
On May 8, 2016, at Global Wars, Cole joined Bullet Club, helping the stable take over the ring in a show-closing angle. On June 16, at Best in the World, Cole teamed up with The Young Bucks and formed The Superkliq to defeat War Machine and Moose. On August 19 at Death Before Dishonor XIV, Cole defeated Jay Lethal to win the ROH World Championship for the second time, becoming the third man to regain the championship. Afterwards, Cole's victory celebration was abruptly ended when he was laid out by a returning Kyle O'Reilly. Cole returned to NJPW on September 22, representing Bullet Club and successfully defending the ROH World Championship against Will Ospreay at Destruction in Hiroshima. Three days later at Destruction in Kobe, Cole and The Young Bucks were defeated by David Finlay, Ricochet and Satoshi Kojima in a match for the vacant NEVER Openweight 6-Man Tag Team Championship. On December 2 at Final Battle, he lost the ROH World Championship to O'Reilly. Cole regained the title from O'Reilly on January 4, 2017, at NJPW's Wrestle Kingdom 11 in Tokyo Dome, thus making Cole the first three-time ROH World Champion. On March 10 at the 15th Anniversary Show, Cole lost the ROH World Championship to Christopher Daniels, when Bullet Club's newest member and Daniels' longtime tag team partner Frankie Kazarian turned on him. In early 2017, Cole began showing tension with Bullet Club stablemate Kenny Omega with The Young Bucks (Matt Jackson and Nick Jackson) caught in the middle. The storyline led to an angle on March 11, where Cole tried to fire The Young Bucks from Bullet Club, but the two responded by stating that Omega, not Cole, was the leader of the stable. Despite the dissension, Cole remained a member of Bullet Club. On May 1, it was reported that Cole's ROH contract had expired and he was now a free agent. On May 12, during the third night of the War of the Worlds tour, Cole was defeated by NJPW's Hiroshi Tanahashi in a singles match. After the match, Kenny Omega and The Young Bucks turned on Cole and kicked him out of Bullet Club, giving his spot in the stable to Marty Scurll. Two days later, Cole was defeated by Scurll in his ROH farewell match, a Philadelphia Street Fight.

=== Pro Wrestling Guerrilla (2011–2017) ===
Cole made his debut in Pro Wrestling Guerrilla (PWG) on October 22, 2011, alongside regular tag team partner O'Reilly as Future Shock, unsuccessfully challenging The Young Bucks for the PWG World Tag Team Championship. Future Shock were defeated by the RockNES Monsters (Johnny Goodtime and Johnny Yuma), at Fear on December 10. On April 21, 2012, Future Shock entered the annual Dynamite Duumvirate Tag Team Title Tournament (DDT4), where they made it to the semifinals, before losing to the eventual tournament winners, Super Smash Bros. (Player Uno and Stupefied). On July 21 at PWG's ninth anniversary event, Future Shock unsuccessfully challenged the Super Smash Bros. for the PWG World Tag Team Championship in a three-way ladder match, which also included The Young Bucks. On September 1, Cole entered the 2012 Battle of Los Angeles, now working under his "Panama City Playboy" heel persona. After upsetting El Generico in his first round match, Cole advanced to the following day's quarterfinals, where he defeated Eddie Edwards. After a win over Sami Callihan in the semifinals, Cole defeated Michael Elgin in the finals to win the 2012 Battle of Los Angeles and become the number one contender to the PWG World Championship. Following his win, Cole attacked the reigning champion, Kevin Steen, and left with his title belt.

On December 1, Cole defeated Steen in a Guerrilla Warfare match to become the new PWG World Champion. On January 12, 2013, Cole reunited with Kyle O'Reilly to enter the 2013 Dynamite Duumvirate Tag Team Title Tournament. After defeating the Dojo Bros (Eddie Edwards and Roderick Strong) in their first round match, Future Shock was eliminated from the tournament in the semifinals by El Generico and Kevin Steen. On March 23, Cole made his first successful defense of the PWG World Championship against Drake Younger, and followed it with another retention against longtime rival, the WWE bound Callihan six falls to five in a 60-minute Iron Man match on June 16. Two months later, at PWG's tenth anniversary event, Cole successfully retained his title in a three-way Guerrilla Warfare match against Drake Younger and Kevin Steen. On August 31, Cole formed a new heel stable named the "Mount Rushmore of Wrestling" with Kevin Steen and The Young Bucks, when the four attacked 2013 Battle of Los Angeles winner Kyle O'Reilly, Candice LeRae, Joey Ryan and referee Rick Knox. On October 19, Cole defeated O'Reilly, with help from his new stablemates, and on December 20 and 21 defeated Chris Hero and Johnny Gargano, respectively, to make his fourth, fifth and sixth successful defenses of the PWG World Championship. On January 31, 2014, the 426th day of his title reign, Cole became the longest reigning PWG World Champion. Cole continued his reign on March 28, successfully defending the title against female wrestler Candice LeRae. Cole's record-setting reign ended on May 23, 2014, when he lost the title to Kyle O'Reilly in a "Knockout or Submission Only" match.

On December 11, 2015, Cole made a surprise return to PWG, joining Roderick Strong, Super Dragon and The Young Bucks as the newest member of Mount Rushmore 2.0. On May 19, 2017, Cole had his farewell match in PWG, where he was defeated by Callihan.

=== WWE (2017–2021) ===
==== Debut with The Undisputed Era (2017–2019) ====
Before signing to WWE, Jenkins worked with the company twice. First on the July 2, 2010, episode of SmackDown where he played a man at a bar drinking with Serena Deeb in a Straight Edge Society segment, after WWE had offered him a tryout meant for Austin Watson (Xavier Woods) and as an apology, offered him a spot as an extra. The second was the first weekend of February 2013, where Jenkins took part in a tryout at their Performance Center in Florida.

On August 14, 2017, multiple sources confirmed that Jenkins had officially signed with WWE and would be working in the company's developmental territory NXT. Cole made his NXT debut on August 19 at NXT TakeOver: Brooklyn III, attacking newly crowned NXT Champion Drew McIntyre, alongside Bobby Fish and Kyle O'Reilly, establishing himself as a heel in the process. The following month, the trio of Cole, Fish and O'Reilly was officially dubbed "The Undisputed Era".

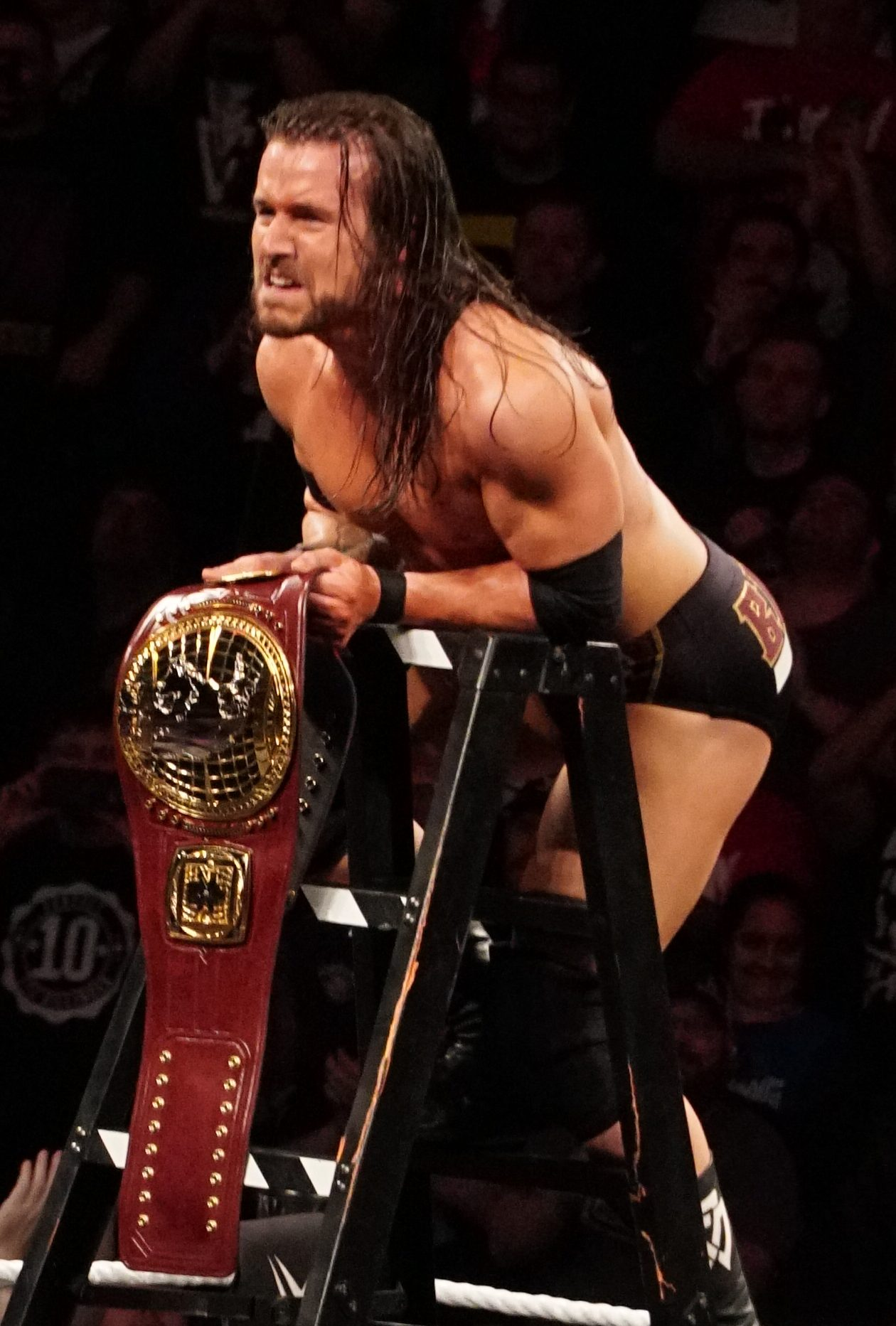

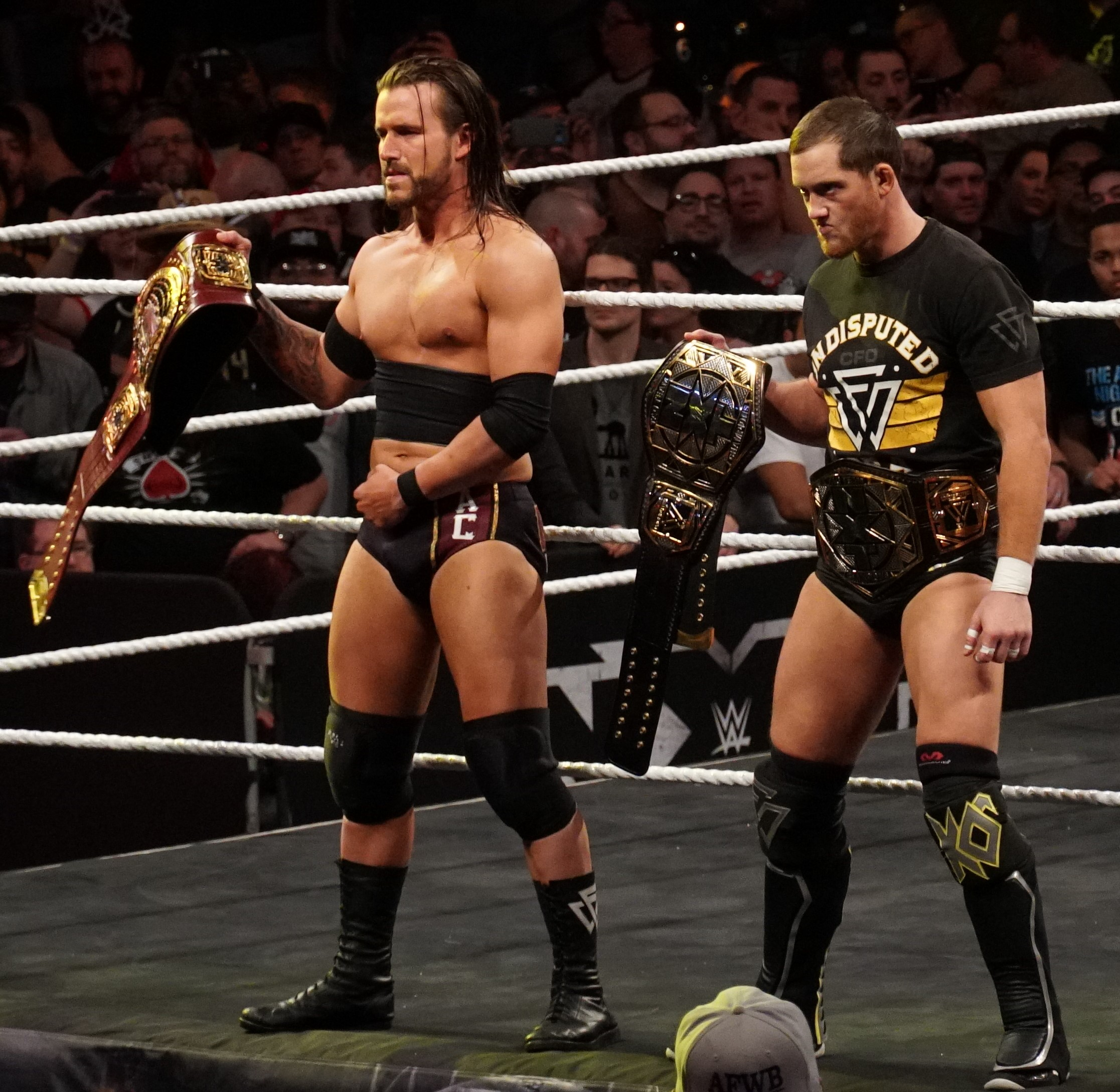
Cole became the inaugural NXT North American Champion (top picture showing him right after win), retained the NXT Tag Team Championship (bottom picture showing him before defense), and won the Dusty Rhodes Tag Team Classic on the same night at NXT TakeOver: New Orleans.

Following weeks of attacking other teams, The Undisputed Era was put in a WarGames match at NXT TakeOver: WarGames against Sanity (Alexander Wolfe, Eric Young, and Killian Dain) and the team of the Authors of Pain (Akam and Rezar) and Roderick Strong. At NXT TakeOver: WarGames on November 18, The Undisputed Era won after Cole pinned Young. On the December 12, Cole was defeated by Aleister Black in a qualifying match for a fatal-four-way number one contender's match for the NXT Championship, which also involved Johnny Gargano, Killian Dain, and Lars Sullivan on the December 27 episode of NXT, where Cole and the Undisputed Era interfered and cost Black the match. This led to Cole facing Black at NXT TakeOver: Philadelphia on January 27, 2018, in an Extreme Rules match. At the event, Cole was defeated by Black, despite interference from Fish and O'Reilly.

Cole competed in the Royal Rumble match at the Royal Rumble pay-per-view on January 28, his first appearance on the main roster. He was eliminated by a returning Rey Mysterio. Cole became the inaugural NXT North American Champion at NXT TakeOver: New Orleans on April 7, 2018, in a ladder match, and later in the night he won the Dusty Rhodes Tag Team Classic as well as defended the NXT Tag Team Championship in a triple threat Winner Take All match with Kyle O'Reilly. On April 25, Cole defeated Oney Lorcan in his first title defense after interference from The Undisputed Era. At NXT TakeOver: Brooklyn IV, Cole lost the NXT North American Championship to Ricochet, ending his reign at 133 days. On the October 10 episode of NXT, Cole failed to regain the NXT North American Championship in triple threat match that also included Pete Dunne. At NXT TakeOver: WarGames, Ricochet, Dunne and War Raiders defeated The Undisputed Era in a WarGames match. Cole participated in the WWE Worlds Collide event. He defeated Shane Thorne in the first round and Keith Lee in the quarterfinals before losing to Tyler Bate in the semifinals. During halftime of Super Bowl LIII, Cole, Johnny Gargano and Tommaso Ciampa were defeated by Ricochet, Black and Velveteen Dream on Halftime Heat.

==== Longest reigning NXT Champion (2019–2020) ====
On the March 20, 2019, episode of NXT, Cole defeated Velveteen Dream, Ricochet, Black and Matt Riddle in a Fatal 5-Way match for the right to face Johnny Gargano for the vacant NXT Championship. At NXT TakeOver: New York on April 5, Cole was defeated 2–1 by Gargano in a two-out-of-three falls match. However, at NXT TakeOver: XXV, Cole defeated Gargano in a rematch to win the championship for the first time. He successfully defended the title against Gargano in a two-out-of-three falls at NXT TakeOver: Toronto on August 10.

In October, Cole and The Undisputed Era began a feud with the returning Tommaso Ciampa. On the November 1 episode of SmackDown, Cole was one of the many members of the NXT roster to invade SmackDown under the orders of Triple H. On the November 4 episode of Raw, Cole defended the NXT Championship against RAW superstar Seth Rollins; Rollins won by disqualification when The Undisputed Era attacked him, setting off a brawl between RAW and NXT; Cole thus retained the championship. At NXT TakeOver: WarGames on November 23, The Undisputed Era were defeated by Team Ciampa (Ciampa, Keith Lee, Dominik Dijakovic, and Kevin Owens) in a WarGames match. The following night at Survivor Series, Cole retained the NXT Championship against Pete Dunne. In the build-up for the NXT and NXT UK co-branded pay-per-view, Worlds Collide, The Undisputed Era began feuding with Imperium (WWE United Kingdom Champion Walter, Alexander Wolfe, Fabian Aichner and Marcel Barthel), which was further intensified during the closing moments of NXT UK TakeOver: Blackpool II on January 12, 2020, where the group attacked Imperium following Walter's successful title defense against Joe Coffey. At Worlds Collide, Imperium defeated The Undisputed Era despite being outnumbered 4-3 after Wolfe suffered an injury early in the match. At NXT TakeOver: Portland on February 16, Cole successfully retained his title against Tommaso Ciampa. On March 19, Cole became the longest reigning NXT Champion, breaking Finn Bálor's previous record of 292 days, and would surpass the one-year mark as champion on June 1 of that year. At TakeOver: In Your House on June 7, Cole retained the championship against Velveteen Dream in a Backlot Brawl. However, during the second night of The Great American Bash on July 8, Cole lost the NXT Championship to NXT North American Champion Keith Lee in a Winner Takes All match, ending Cole's record-breaking reign at 403 days.

==== Implosion of The Undisputed Era and departure (2020–2021) ====
After losing the NXT Championship, Cole slowly turned face as he began a rivalry with announcer Pat McAfee, after the two got into an argument on McAfee's eponymous sports talk show and McAfee punted Cole in the head on the August 5 episode of NXT. This led to a match between the two being set up for NXT TakeOver XXX, which Cole won. Cole cemented his face turn on the September 30 episode of NXT after calling out Austin Theory, who had insulted Kyle O'Reilly earlier in the night during a backstage promo. Cole and the other members of The Undisputed Era would go on to feud with McAfee, Pete Dunne, Danny Burch, and Oney Lorcan. Over the next few weeks on NXT, McAfee mocked The Undisputed Era until they returned on the November 18 episode of NXT. General Manager of NXT, William Regal, announced that both teams would face each other at NXT Takeover: WarGames. At the event, The Undisputed Era defeated Team McAfee. Heading into 2021, Cole and Roderick Strong announced their participation in the Men's Dusty Rhodes Tag Team Classic. On the January 13, 2021, episode of NXT, they faced Breezango (Fandango and Tyler Breeze) in the first round and were victorious. On the February 3 episode of NXT, Cole and Strong were eliminated from the tournament after being defeated by the team of Tommaso Ciampa and Timothy Thatcher in the quarterfinals.

At NXT TakeOver: Vengeance Day, The Undisputed Era assisted Finn Bálor after he was attacked by Dunne, Burch and Lorcan. As The Undisputed Era and Bálor posed together, Cole suddenly superkicked Bálor and then turn on O'Reilly, subsequently turning heel in the process. On the February 17 episode of NXT, Cole attacked O'Reilly during the latter's six man tag team match against Dunne, Burch and Lorcan. After Dunne's team picked up the win, Cole delivered a superkick to Bálor and raised the NXT Championship in the air. On the February 24 episode of NXT, Cole apologized for what he did to O'Reilly before Strong interrupted Cole. Bálor then came out and attacked Cole and Strong until Cole hit a superkick on Bálor. After crying and apologizing profusely to Strong, Cole then delivered a low blow to Strong and proclaimed himself as The Undisputed Era. On the March 3 episode of NXT, Bálor challenged Cole to for the NXT Championship the following week, which Cole accepted. The following week on NXT, Cole was defeated by Bálor after O'Reilly distracted him, and was viciously assaulted afterwards, ending with O'Reilly ripping off Cole's Undisputed Era armband, officially kicking Cole off the group. On the March 24 episode of NXT, after many heated encounters between Cole and O'Reilly, they officially signed a contract for their unsanctioned match on Night 2 of NXT TakeOver: Stand & Deliver. At the event, Cole lost to O'Reilly.

On the June 1 episode of NXT, Cole returned and took out O'Reilly, Dunne and Johnny Gargano in a triple threat match to determine Karrion Kross' opponent for the NXT Championship at NXT TakeOver: In Your House. Later that night, Cole and Kross confronted each which led to a match being made at NXT TakeOver: In Your House where Kross defended his title against Cole, O'Reilly, Gargano and Dunne. At the event, Cole was unsuccessful in winning the NXT Championship. After failing to win back the championship, Cole reignited his feud with O'Reilly. A rematch between the two was made for The Great American Bash, where Cole defeated O'Reilly. On the August 10 episode of NXT, it was announced that Cole and O'Reilly would face each other in a two out of three falls match at NXT TakeOver 36. At the event, O'Reilly defeated Cole. This was Cole's final match and appearance in NXT, as his WWE contract expired.

According to Dave Meltzer, shortly after Jenkins signed with All Elite Wrestling, that if he had stayed with the WWE, he would have been promoted to the main roster but as a manager for a heel-turned Keith Lee on the Raw brand. Additionally, Jenkins would have received a haircut and he would have also received a name change to avoid confusion with longtime announcer Michael Cole; the decision reportedly came directly from Vince McMahon and Bruce Prichard. This idea was later ridiculed and parodied in AEW, with John Silver of The Dark Order facetiously offering to "let" Adam Cole be his manager if Jenkins would agree to change his name and cut his hair. Lee himself would be released by WWE three months after Jenkins' departure and joined AEW months later.

=== All Elite Wrestling (2021–present) ===
==== Reunion with The Elite (2021–2022) ====
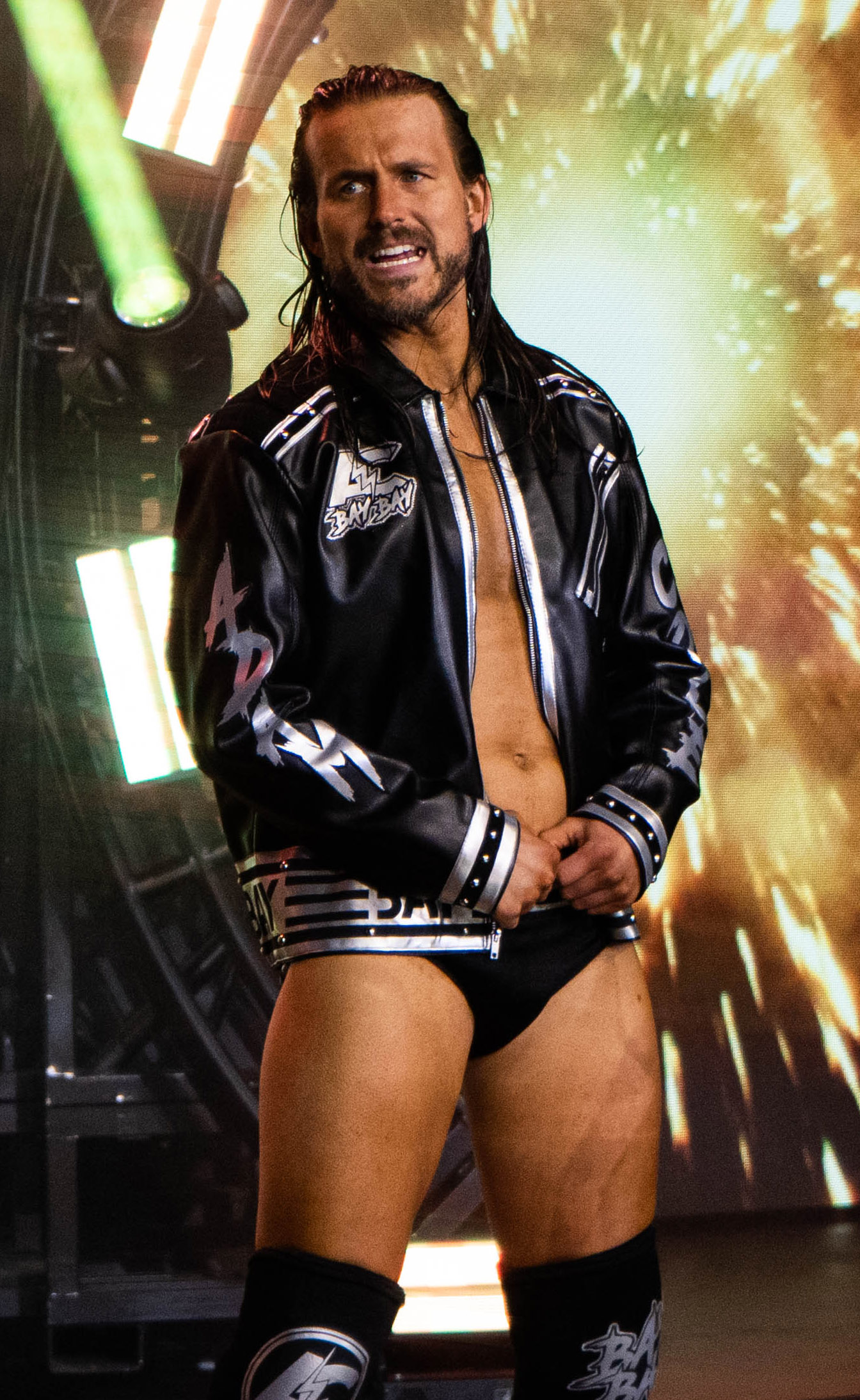
Cole appearing in AEW in 2022

On September 5, 2021, Cole made his surprise debut for All Elite Wrestling (AEW) at the promotion's All Out pay-per-view, following the main event match by reuniting with former Bullet Club stablemates Kenny Omega and The Young Bucks (Matt Jackson and Nick Jackson), as well as joining their stable, The Elite, establishing himself as a heel in the process. In a post-All Out news conference, Cole stated that his decision to sign with AEW was "fairly easy", as he wanted to work with everyone at AEW "24/7" as well as being able to have full access to his Twitch stream, something that WWE would have restricted had he been promoted to the main roster. The decision also allowed him to work with real-life girlfriend Britt Baker, which was immediately acknowledged on his Dynamite debut later that week when he threatened to beat up announcer Tony Schiavone over the latter's friendship with Baker. The following week on Dynamite, Cole made his in-ring debut, defeating Frankie Kazarian. At Grand Slam on Rampage, Cole would team with The Young Bucks to defeat the team of Christian Cage, Jungle Boy and Luchasaurus. At Full Gear, Cole along with The Young Bucks would be defeated by Cage, Jungle Boy and Luchasaurus in a falls count anywhere match.

In November, Cole, alongside The Young Bucks and Bobby Fish, began a feud with Orange Cassidy and Best Friends. On the Holiday Bash special episode of Dynamite on December 22, Cole defeated Cassidy after an interference from the debuting Kyle O'Reilly, reuniting with Cole and Fish. The following week on New Year's Smash episode of Dynamite, they defeated Orange Cassidy and Best Friends. On the January 19 episode of Dynamite, Cole and Britt Baker defeated Cassidy and Kris Statlander in a mixed tag team match, scoring another victory on Cassidy. The following week, at the Beach Break special episode of Dynamite on January 26, Cassidy defeated Cole in a Lights Out that involved appearances from Best Friends, The Young Bucks, Bobby Fish and Danhausen. On the February 16 episode of Dynamite, Cole confronted AEW World Champion "Hangman" Adam Page, after Page's title match against Lance Archer. The following week, Cole challenged Page to a title match at Revolution, a match he would lose. Cole would receive a rematch against Page for the title on the April 15 episode of Rampage in a Texas Deathmatch, which Cole would once again lose.

On the April 20 episode of Dynamite, Cole alongside Jay White, interrupted Tony Khan and Takami Ohbari's announcement of Forbidden Door on June 26, where Cole made the announcement and White claimed the show would be "all about" both The Undisputed Elite and the Bullet Club. Cole also announced himself to be competing in the Owen Hart Cup tournament naming his qualifying opponent as Tomohiro Ishii. On the April 22 episode of Rampage, Cole defeated Ishii. Cole defeated Dax Harwood and Jeff Hardy, to advance to the tournament finals at Double or Nothing. At the event, he defeated Samoa Joe in the finals to win the men's tournament.

On the June 8 episode of Dynamite, Cole interrupted Page who had called out IWGP World Heavyweight Champion Kazuchika Okada and had challenged him to a match for his IWGP World Heavyweight Champion at Forbidden Door. Cole deemed Page unworthy to face for the World Championship, whilst also stating that Okada may not be Champion by Forbidden Door, due to his title defense against Cole's ally, Jay White at Dominion 6.12 in Osaka-jo Hall. After White won the World Championship at the event, Page was set to address the situation on the special Road Rager episode of Dynamite on June 15, but Cole once again interrupted Page, stating his own challenge for the Championship. This led to White attacking Page from behind with a Bladerunner. After this, White refused to defend his title against Page at Forbidden Door, much to Cole's delight, although White also refused to defend the title against Cole at the event, much to Cole's dismay. On the June 22 episode of Dynamite, Cole once again interrupted Page, only to be interrupted himself by White, who refused to defend his title against Cole, due to his two losses to Page in AEW. White and Cole then attacked Page, only for Okada to debut in AEW and save Page. Soon after, a four-way match between Cole, Page, White and Okada, for the IWGP World Heavyweight Championship was announced for Forbidden Door. At the event, White retained the World Championship. Cole suffered a severe concussion during the match leading to the match being cut short, and rendering Cole unable to compete for an unspecified amount of time.

Cole returned to AEW on the August 3 episode of Rampage, where he, Fish and O'Reilly would turn on and attack The Young Bucks, splitting from The Elite. Following this, Cole would remain absent from AEW programming for the rest of the year, recovering from his concussion.

==== Better Than You Bay Bay and Undisputed Kingdom (2023–2025) ====
Cole made his surprise return on the January 11, 2023, episode of Dynamite as a face. His feud after his return was against Chris Jericho, including the debut of his teammate Roderick Strong to face the Jericho Appreciation Society. Cole defeated Jericho twice, once at Double or Nothing in an unsanctioned match (with Sabu as the special guest enforcer), and in a mixed tag team match where Cole and Britt Baker defeated Jericho and Saraya.

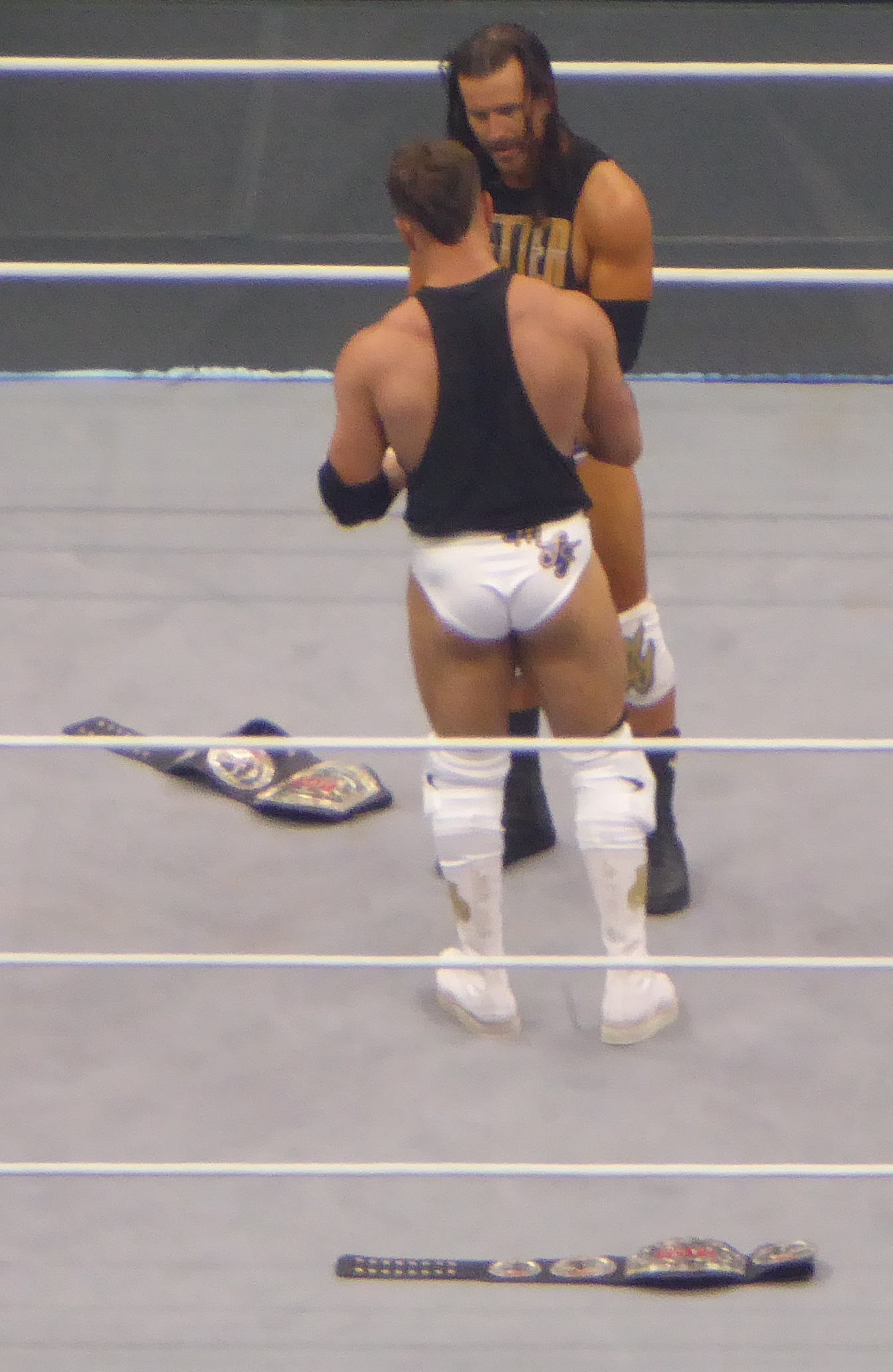
Cole (back) and MJF (front) at All In in August 2023.

In June, Cole began a storyline with AEW World Champion MJF. Cole and MJF faced each other in a world title eliminator match, but the match ended on a time limit draw. They were paired on the Blind Eliminator Tournament, defeating Daniel Garcia and Sammy Guevara in the tournament finals to win the tournament and earn an AEW World Tag Team Championship match against FTR (Dax Harwood and Cash Wheeler). The title match took place on the July 29 episode of Collision, where Cole and MJF lost. Despite the loss, they continued to work as a tag team. At All In, they defeated Aussie Open (Kyle Fletcher and Mark Davis) to win the ROH World Tag Team Championship and Cole challenged MJF for the AEW World Championship in the main event but lost, resulting in MJF retaining the title. On the September 20 episode of Dynamite, Cole suffered a major ankle injury after jumping off the entrance ramp during MJF's match with Samoa Joe in the main event. In a 2024 interview with Sports Illustrated, Cole revealed that his injury was so severe, he had to receive a cadaver bone donation for his ankle. Regardless, AEW continued to sporadically feature Cole as part of their programming. On December 30 at Worlds End, Cole revealed himself as The Devil along with The Devil's Masked Men (Matt Taven, Mike Bennett, Roderick Strong and Wardlow), turning heel once again and forming Undisputed Kingdom. On May 26, 2024, at Double or Nothing, Cole made an appearance, where he would be interrupted and attacked by a returning MJF.

Cole (now once again as a face) made his on-screen return to AEW at WrestleDream on October 12, where he chased off MJF (who was now a heel) from attacking Garcia. On the October 23 episode of Dynamite, MJF made a deal with both Cole and Strong, stating that whoever won three matches in a row first would get a match against him at Full Gear on November 23. On October 30 at Fright Night Dynamite, Cole defeated Buddy Matthews in his first match since September 2023. The following week on Dynamite, he defeated Matthews' House of Black stablemate Malakai Black. On the November 13 episode of Dynamite, Cole would lose to Konosuke Takeshita and as a result would not be able to face MJF at Full Gear. On December 11 at Winter is Coming, Cole defeated Kyle O'Reilly to earn the right to challenge MJF for his Dynamite Diamond Ring at Worlds End on December 28. At Worlds End, Cole was defeated by MJF, ending their feud. After the match, Strong and O'Reilly helped Cole fend off an MJF post-match attack, with O'Reilly subsequently joining Undisputed Kingdom.

After Worlds End, Cole began a feud with Garcia for the AEW TNT Championship, facing him twice for the title, but the matches ending in a no contest and a time-limit draw. On April 6, 2025 at Dynasty, Cole would go on to defeat Garcia for the title, giving him his first championship in AEW.

==== The Paragon and hiatus (2025–present) ====
On the April 9 episode of Dynamite following Dynasty, Cole addressed winning the AEW TNT Championship in a backstage segment alongside Strong and O'Reilly and formed their own group known as "The Paragon". On April 17 at Collision: Spring BreakThru, Cole successfully defended his title against Claudio Castagnoli. On May 25 at Double or Nothing, Paragon were defeated by the Don Callis Family (Josh Alexander, Konosuke Takeshita, and Kyle Fletcher). After Double or Nothing in May, Cole began a feud with Kyle Fletcher over the title, with Cole defeating Fletcher via disqualification on the May 28 episode of Dynamite. On the June 26 episode of Collision, Cole successfully defended his title against Josh Alexander.

Cole was scheduled to defend the TNT Championship against Kyle Fletcher at All In on July 12, but was forced to vacate the title after being unable to receive medical clearance due to undisclosed health issues, ending his reign at 97 days. Cole addressed the audience, stating that he would be sidelined indefinitely and hinting at a possible in-ring retirement. It was later reported that Cole had originally intended to announce his retirement, but ultimately decided against doing so after "cooler heads prevailed". During Cole's hiatus, O'Reilly and Strong would become members of The Conglomeration, leaving the status of the Paragon unknown.

== Other media ==
Jenkins made his video game debut as a playable character in WWE 2K19, and appeared in its sequel WWE 2K20. He also appears as a playable character in AEW Fight Forever.

He also streams on Twitch as "TheCHUGS". He also makes appearances in the AEW Games YouTube channel.

Jenkins, alongside Britt Baker, appeared on the May 8, 2022 episode "Working to Death" of the American reality series Bar Rescue.

== Personal life ==
Jenkins was in a relationship with fellow professional wrestler Britt Baker. The two started dating in 2017 while they were living in Pennsylvania, having previously met using the Bumble app. In October 2024, Jenkins confirmed in an interview with Sports Illustrated that he and Baker were no longer together, but remain friends.

Jenkins cites Shawn Michaels as his inspiration and Stone Cold Steve Austin as the wrestler who got him into professional wrestling.

== Championships and accomplishments ==
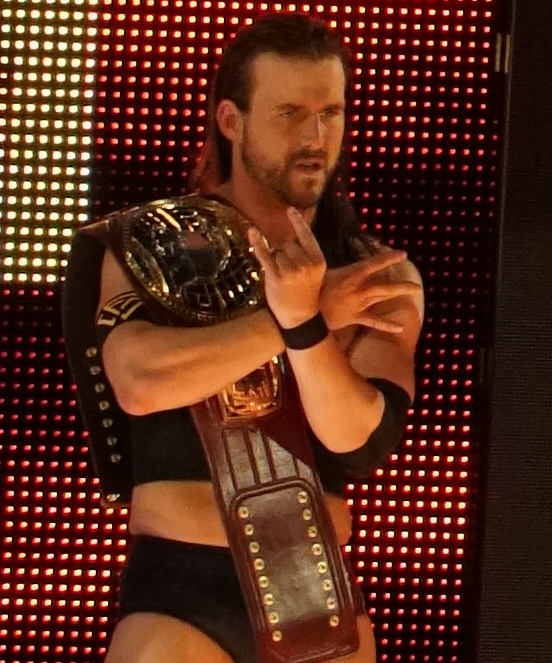
Cole is the inaugural NXT North American Champion.

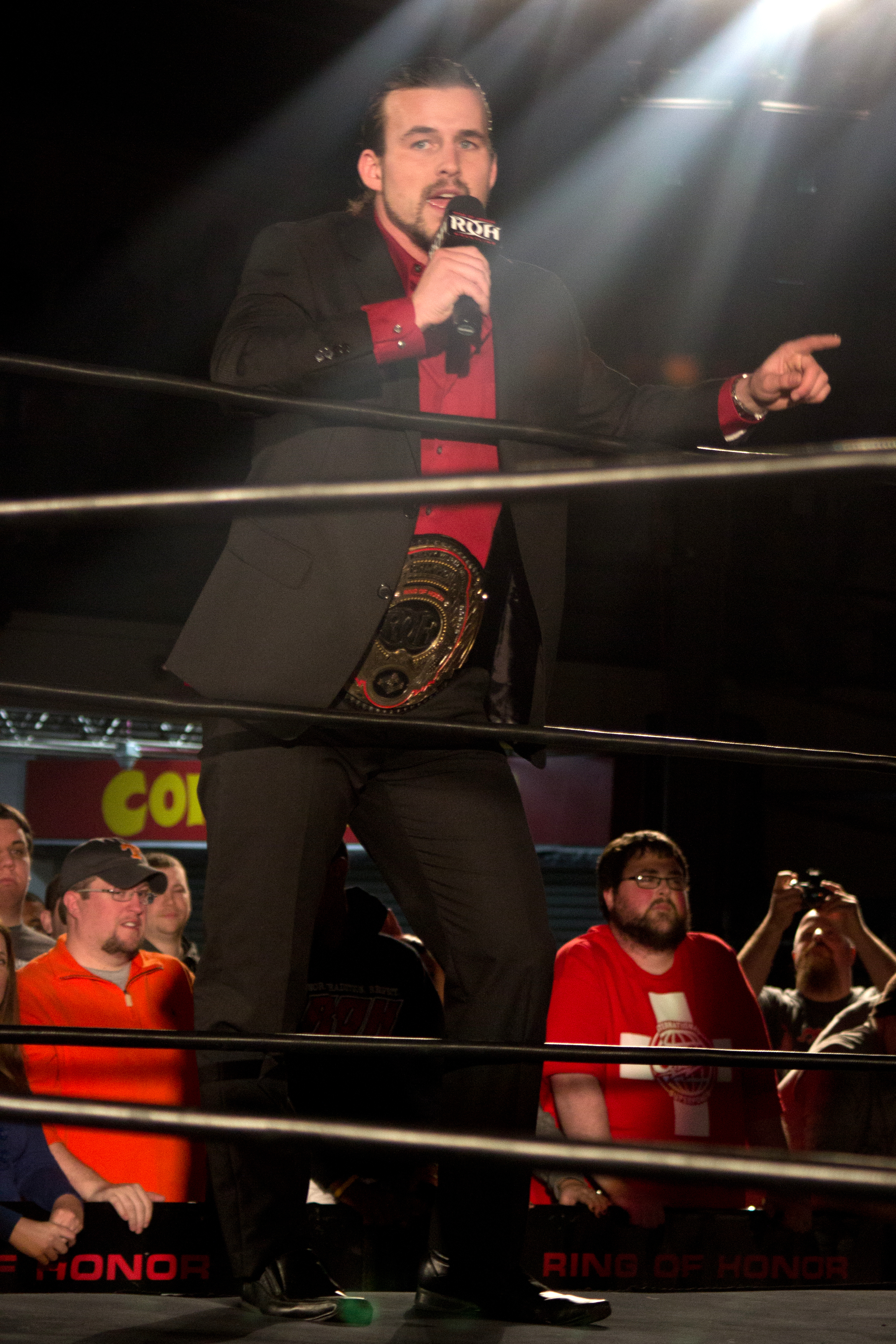
Cole is a record setting three-time ROH World Champion.

- All Elite Wrestling
  - AEW TNT Championship (1 time)
  - Blind Eliminator Tag Team Tournament (2023) – with MJF
  - Men's Owen Hart Cup (2022)
  - Dynamite Award (1 time)
    - Biggest Surprise (2022) – Adam Cole and Bryan Danielson make their debut
- CBS Sports
  - Feud of the Year (2019) vs. Johnny Gargano
  - Match of the Year (2019) vs. Johnny Gargano at NXT TakeOver: New York
  - Wrestler of the Year (2019)
- Combat Zone Wrestling
  - CZW World Junior Heavyweight Championship (1 time)
  - Best of the Best X (2011)
- Dreams Fighting Entertainment/World Wrestling League
  - DFE Openweight Championship/WWL Heavyweight Championship (Note: Cole became recognized as the World Wrestling League Heavyweight Champion due to title name change in October 2012.) (1 time)
- Eastern Wrestling Alliance
  - EWA Cruiserweight Championship (1 time)
- Ground Breaking Wrestling
  - Battle of Gettysburg (2009)
- International Wrestling Cartel
  - IWC Super Indy Championship (1 time)
  - Super Indy 16 (2017)
- Maryland Championship Wrestling
  - MCW Rage Television Championship (2 times)
  - Shane Shamrock Memorial Cup (2012)
- New Horizon Pro Wrestling
  - NHPW Art of Fighting Championship (1 time)
- Premiere Wrestling Xperience
  - PWX Heavyweight Championship (1 time)
- Preston City Wrestling
  - PCW Cruiserweight Championship (1 time)
- Pro Wrestling Guerrilla
  - PWG World Championship (1 time)
  - Battle of Los Angeles (2012)
- Pro Wrestling Illustrated
  - Feud of the Year (2019) vs. Johnny Gargano
  - Wrestler of the Year (2019)
  - Ranked No. 2 of the top 500 singles wrestlers in the PWI 500 in 2020
- Pro Wrestling World-1
  - World-1 North American Championship (1 time)
  - Shinya Hashimoto Memorial Cup (2010)
- Real Championship Wrestling
  - RCW Cruiserweight Championship (1 time)
  - RCW Tag Team Championship (1 time) – with Devon Moore
- Ring of Honor
  - ROH World Championship (3 times)
  - ROH World Television Championship (1 time)
  - ROH World Tag Team Championship (1 time) – with MJF
  - Eighth ROH Triple Crown Champion
  - ROH World Championship Tournament (2013)
  - ROH World Tag Team Championship No. 1 Contender Lottery Tournament (2011) – with Kyle O'Reilly
  - Survival of the Fittest (2014)
- SoCal Uncensored
  - Match of the Year (2012) with Kyle O'Reilly vs. Super Smash Bros. (Player Uno and Stupefied and The Young Bucks on July 21
  - Match of the Year (2016) with The Young Bucks (Matt Jackson and Nick Jackson) vs. Matt Sydal, Ricochet and Will Ospreay on September 3
  - Wrestler of the Year (2013)
- Sports Illustrated
  - Ranked No. 2 of the top 10 male wrestlers in 2019
- WrestleCircus
  - Big Top Tag Team Championship (1 time) – with Britt Baker
- Wrestling Observer Newsletter
  - Rookie of the Year (2010)
  - Feud of the Year (2019) vs. Johnny Gargano
  - Worst Feud of the Year (2023, 2024) as "The Devil"/Adam Cole vs. MJF
  - Worst Gimmick (2023) as "The Devil"
- WXW C4
  - WXW C4 Hybrid Championship (1 time)
- WWE
  - NXT Championship (1 time)
  - NXT North American Championship (1 time, inaugural)
  - NXT Tag Team Championship (1 time) – with Roderick Strong, Bobby Fish and Kyle O'Reilly (Note: Fish and O'Reilly originally won the title as a duo, but Cole and Roderick Strong also became recognized as champions under the Freebird Rule after Fish suffered an injury.)
  - Second NXT Triple Crown Champion
  - Dusty Rhodes Tag Team Classic (2018) – with Kyle O'Reilly
  - NXT Year-End Award (7 times)
    - Male Competitor of the Year (2019, 2020)
    - Overall Competitor of the Year (2019)
    - Match of The Year (2019) Two out of three falls match vs. Johnny Gargano at NXT TakeOver: New York
    - Rivalry of the Year (2019, 2020) vs. Johnny Gargano, vs. Pat McAfee
    - Tag Team of the Year (2020) – with Roderick Strong, Bobby Fish and Kyle O'Reilly
  - Bumpy Award (1 time)
    - Rivalry of the Half-Year (2021) – vs Kyle O'Reilly
