= Kairi Sane =

Japanese professional wrestler and actress (born 1988)

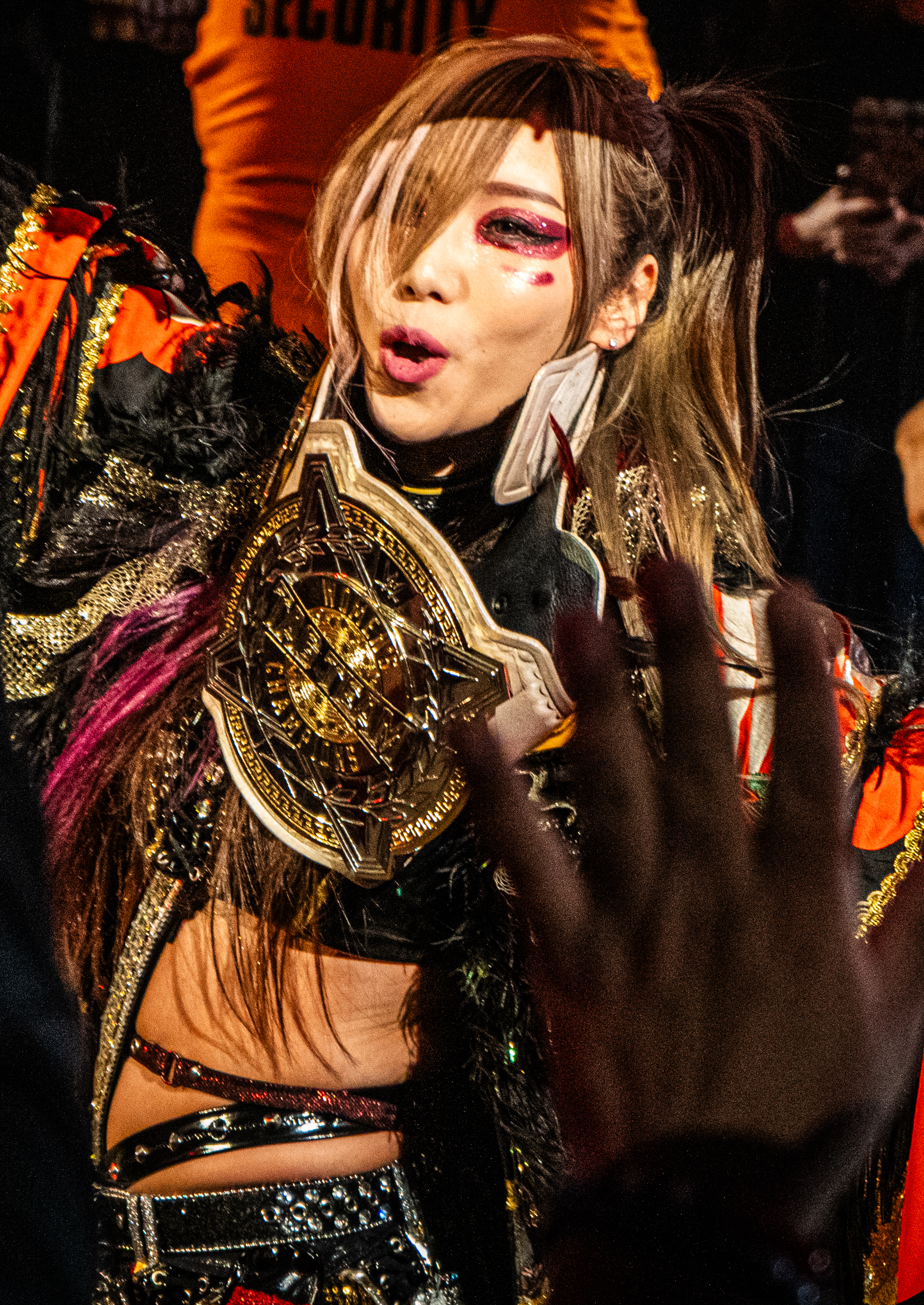
- Sane in 2024

Personal information
- Born: Kaori Housako (宝迫 香織, Hōsako Kaori); September 23, 1988 (age 38) Hikari, Yamaguchi Prefecture, Japan
- Education: Hosei University

Professional wrestling career
- Ring name(s): Doku; Kairi; Kairi Hojo; Kairian; Kairian 3.0; Kairi Sane; Pirates Kaiser
- Billed height: 155 cm (5 ft 1 in)
- Billed weight: 52 kg (115 lb)
- Billed from: Yamaguchi Prefecture, Japan
- Trained by: Fuka Kakimoto
- Debut: January 7, 2012

Kaori Housako (宝迫 香織, Hōsako Kaori; born September 23, 1988) is a Japanese professional wrestler and actress. She is best known for her two tenures in WWE, where she performed under the ring name Kairi Sane (カイリ・セイン, Kairi Sein).

From 2012 to 2017, she wrestled for the Japanese promotion World Wonder Ring Stardom under the ring name Kairi Hojo (宝城 カイリ, Hōjō Kairi). Embodying a "Pirate Princess" persona, she became a one-time World of Stardom Champion, a one-time Wonder of Stardom Champion, a three-time Goddesses of Stardom Champion and a five-time Artist of Stardom Champion. She also won the 2015 5Star Grand Prix Tournament and the 2016 Goddesses of Stardom Tag League.

In 2017, she signed with WWE, where she adopted the ring name Kairi Sane. She won the inaugural Mae Young Classic tournament the same year, and was then assigned to the NXT brand. She captured the NXT Women's Championship in 2018 and subsequently won the 2018 NXT Year-End Awards for Female Competitor of the Year and for Overall Competitor of the Year. In 2019, she debuted on WWE's main roster, where she became a one-time and the longest reigning WWE Women's Tag Team Champion, along with Asuka as part of the Kabuki Warriors. The team also received 2019 WWE Year-End Award for Women's Tag Team of the Year. In 2020, she returned to Japan to join her husband, and worked as a WWE ambassador and trainer in her native country until December 2021 when her contract expired.

After her stint with WWE, she returned to World Wonder Ring Stardom in February 2022 and performed under ring name Kairi (stylized in all caps). She also performed for New Japan Pro-Wrestling (NJPW) where she was a one-time and inaugural IWGP Women's Champion. She became a free agent in March 2023 and returned to WWE at Crown Jewel 2023 until her release in April 2026.

== Early life ==
Kaori Housako was born on September 23, 1988, in Hikari, Yamaguchi Prefecture, Japan. She has a sister, who is three years older than her. She has an extensive sports background in yachting, competing in intercollegiate and national competitions, while also taking part in world championships with dreams of making it to the Olympics. After graduating from Hosei University with a bachelor's degree in Japanese literature, Housako began pursuing a career in acting. She also did some theater work and one of her performances, where she performed as a professional wrestling villain, was seen by Fuka, the general manager of the World Wonder Ring Stardom promotion, who invited Housako to one of their events. She quickly fell in love with professional wrestling's aspect of combining acting with sports and decided to become a wrestler herself.

== Professional wrestling career ==
=== World Wonder Ring Stardom (2011–2017) ===
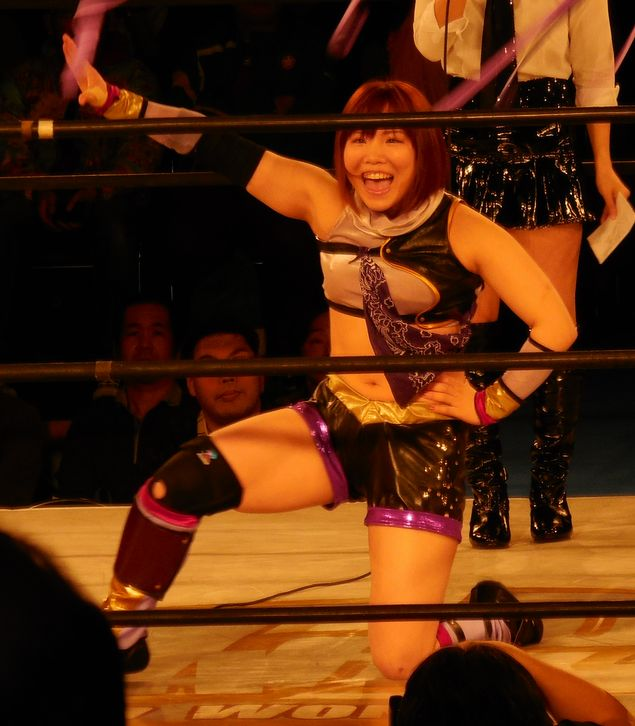
Housako in 2013

Housako started training with Stardom in 2011. On November 14, 2011, she passed her "pro test" and graduated as part of Stardom's third class of trainees, alongside Act Yasukawa, Natsumi Showzuki and Yuuri Haruka. Housako, now working under the ring name "Kairi Hojo", made her debut for Stardom on January 7, 2012, losing to Yuzuki Aikawa. Playing off her yachting background, Hojo was dubbed "Pirate Princess". She quickly became a founding member of the Zenryoku Joshi stable, led by Aikawa. In November 2012, Hojo formed a new tag team with Natsumi Showzuki, with the two finishing second in the 2012 Goddesses of Stardom Tag League. Zenryoku Joshi disbanded in January 2013, when Hojo unsuccessfully challenged her stablemate Yuzuki Aikawa for the Wonder of Stardom Championship. Hojo won her first title on April 29, 2013, at Ryōgoku Cinderella, where she and Showzuki, billed collectively as "Ho-Show Tennyo", defeated Hailey Hatred and Kyoko Kimura for the Goddesses of Stardom Championship. Their reign, however, lasted only a month, as they were stripped of the title when Showzuki was sidelined with a cervical spine injury. Showzuki never returned from her injury, instead resigning from Stardom.

On June 23, 2013, Hojo teamed with Kaori Yoneyama and Yuhi to defeat Christina Von Eerie, Hailey Hatred and Kyoko Kimura for the vacant Artist of Stardom Championship. They lost the title to Kimura, Alpha Female and The Female Predator "Amazon" on November 4. In May 2014, Hojo made her Mexican debut by representing Stardom in the DragonMania 9 and Lucha Fan Fest 8 events. In August, Stardom's roster was split in half as part of a storyline rivalry between older wrestlers born in the Shōwa period and younger wrestlers born in the Heisei period. Hojo, having been born in the Shōwa period, aligned herself with the likes of Nanae Takahashi and Miho Wakizawa. On August 10, Hojo regained the Goddesses of Stardom Championship, when she and Takahashi defeated Alpha Female and Kyoko Kimura. After an eight-month reign, she was again stripped of the title, when Takahashi was sidelined with an ankle injury.

In February 2015, following an incident between Act Yasukawa and Yoshiko, Hojo was named an intermediary between the wrestlers and management in order to bring the two sides closer. Following the incident, Stardom's top title, the World of Stardom Championship, was declared vacant with a tournament scheduled to determine the new champion. On March 29, Hojo defeated first Kyoko Kimura and then Io Shirai to win the World of Stardom Championship for the first time. After a four-month reign, she lost the title to Meiko Satomura on July 26. Hojo bounced back by winning Stardom's top singles tournament, the 5★Star GP, by defeating Hudson Envy in the finals on September 23. At the end of the year, Hojo was named Stardom's MVP of 2015. In January 2016, Hojo came together with former rivals Io Shirai and Mayu Iwatani to form a new stable. On February 28, 2016, the three, now billed collectively as "Threedom" (a combination of the words "Three" and "Stardom"), defeated Evie, Hiroyo Matsumoto and Kellie Skater to win the Artist of Stardom Championship. In April, Hojo, along with Iwatani and Shirai, traveled to the United States to take part in events held by Lucha Underground and Vendetta Pro Wrestling. On May 15, Hojo won another title, when she defeated Santana Garrett for the Wonder of Stardom Championship, winning the title in her fourth attempt. On August 8, Hojo debuted for the Inoki Genome Federation (IGF), defeating Jungle Kyona at an event in Shanghai. On September 3, Hojo defeated Io Shirai to take over the leadership of the Red Stars block in the 2016 5★Star GP. However, during the match, she suffered a concussion, which forced her to pull out of her remaining tournament. On October 2, Threedom lost the Artist of Stardom Championship to Hana Kimura, Kagetsu and Kyoko Kimura in their third defense.

On November 11, Hojo and Yoko Bito defeated Io Shirai and Mayu Iwatani in the finals to win the 2016 Goddesses of Stardom Tag League. Following the match, Shirai turned on Iwatani and disbanded Threedom. On December 22, Hojo and Bito defeated Kagetsu and Kyoko Kimura to become the new Goddesses of Stardom Champions. They lost the title to Hiroyo Matsumoto and Jungle Kyona in their second defense on March 5, 2017. Also in March, it was reported that Hojo had told Stardom's office that she was leaving the promotion for WWE the following month. On March 20, Hojo unsuccessfully challenged Io Shirai for the World of Stardom Championship. On May 6, Hojo, Hiromi Mimura and Konami defeated AZM, HZK and Io Shirai to win the Artist of Stardom Championship. Following the match, Hojo confirmed her impending departure from Stardom, without specifically mentioning WWE. Sane had contemplated retirement due to her age and injuries, but decided to go wrestle overseas after consulting Bull Nakano. The following day, Threedom reunited for one final match together, defeating Hiromi Mimura, HZK and Jungle Kyona in a six-woman tag team match. Hojo's one-year reign as the Wonder of Stardom Champion ended on May 14, when she lost the title to Mayu Iwatani in her ninth title defense, falling one defense short of tying Santana Garrett's record for most defenses. Hojo wrestled her final matches for Stardom on June 4. After Hojo, Mimura and Konami lost the Artist of Stardom Championship back to AZM, HZK and Shirai in their second defense, Hojo wrestled an unadvertised ten-match one-minute time limit series against members of the Stardom roster that ended in three wins, six draws and one loss.

=== WWE (2016–2021) ===
==== Signing and Mae Young Classic (2016–2017) ====
In October 2016, Housako was contacted and offered a WWE contract, starting the following year. Reportedly, Housako had stated that she was interested in going to WWE, but had not made a final decision yet. There were also questions over whether she could pass the company's physical examination due to her two concussions during the past two years. In March 2017, Housako signed a three-year contract with WWE, reportedly for $60,000 per year, which was less than she was making in Japan.

On June 30, a video at a WWE house show in Tokyo, introduced Housako as "Kairi Sane" to WWE's developmental brand, NXT, as well as the upcoming Mae Young Classic tournament. On July 13, she defeated Tessa Blanchard in the tournament's first round in her WWE debut match. The following day, Sane first defeated Bianca Belair in the second round, then Dakota Kai in quarterfinals and finally Toni Storm in the semifinals to advance to the finals of the tournament. Reportedly, Sane suffered both a concussion and a neck injury during the tapings. On September 12, Sane defeated Shayna Baszler in the tournament finals and thereby earned a shot at the vacant NXT Women's Championship at the next NXT TakeOver show.

==== NXT (2017–2019) ====
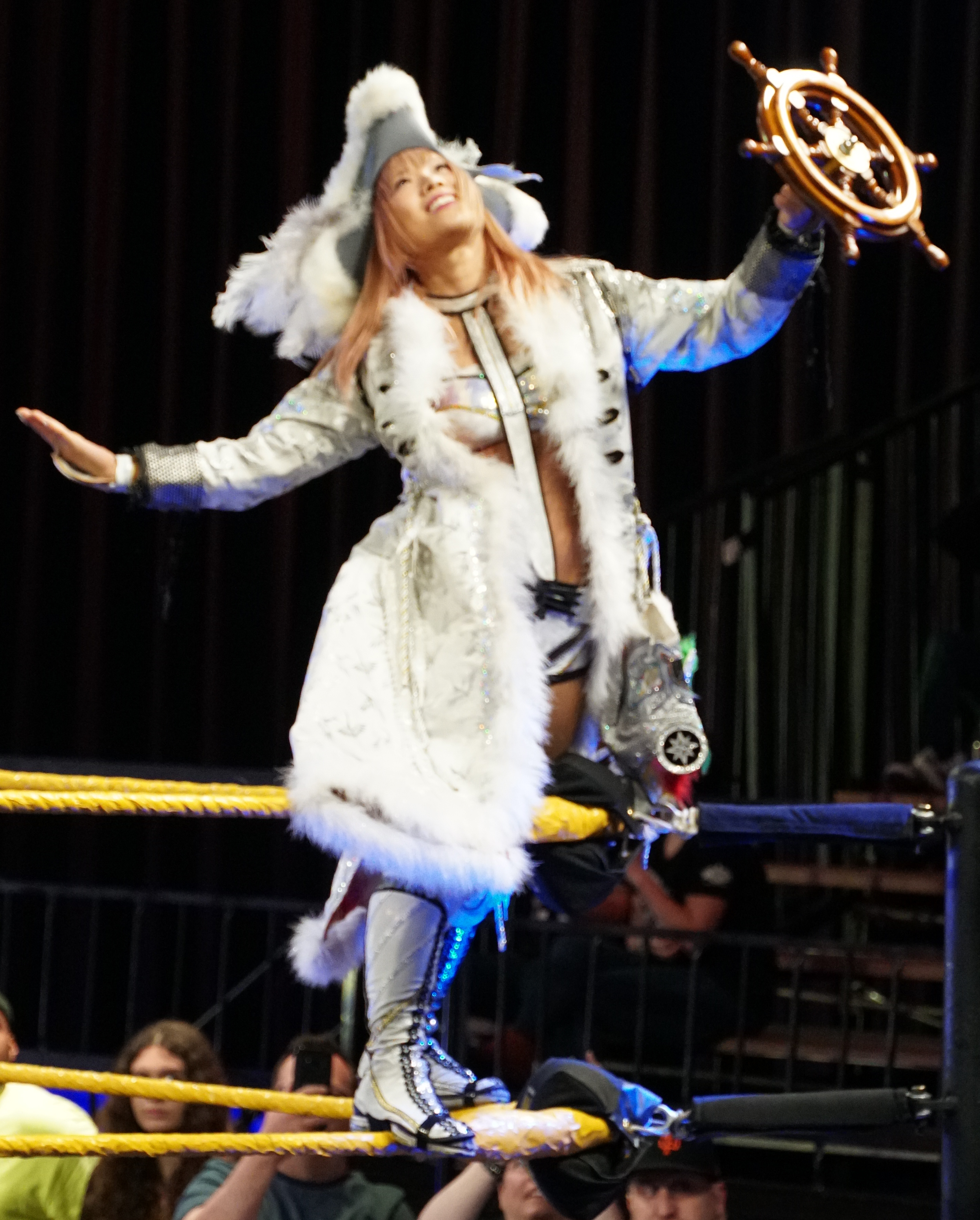
Sane making her entrance in 2018

In October 2017, Sane made her television debut on NXT, defeating Aliyah. In November, at TakeOver: WarGames, Sane competed in a fatal four–way match for the vacant NXT Women's Championship. but was unsuccessful as Ember Moon won the match.

On January 28, 2018, at the Royal Rumble, Sane participated in the first women's Royal Rumble match, entering at number 6 and lasting around 5 minutes before being eliminated by Dana Brooke. A few months later, she also participated in the WrestleMania Women's Battle Royal at WrestleMania 34, alongside other NXT superstars, but was eliminated from the match by Sasha Banks.

In July, after she defeated Candice LeRae and Nikki Cross in a triple–threat match to become the number one contender, Sane reignited her rivalry with Shayna Baszler, as the two exchanged victories in the Mae Young Classic Finals and at NXT and faced off in a match at TakeOver: Brooklyn 4 on August 18 where Sane was able to defeat Bazsler to win the NXT Women's Championship for the first time in her career. On October 28, at the WWE Evolution pay–per–view, Sane lost the championship back to Baszler (after interference from her allies Jessamyn Duke and Marina Shafir) ending her reign at 71 days. Three weeks later, at TakeOver: WarGames, Sane received her rematch against Baszler in a two out of three falls match, but she failed to regain the title after interference from Duke and Shafir again. Because of the interferences, Sane eventually aligned with her best friend Io Shirai and Dakota Kai against Baszler, Duke and Shafir. Shortly after, Kai was sidelined with an injury and Sane continued to team with Shirai, forming a tag team known as "The Sky Pirates" while continuing to defeat various teams.

On April 5, 2019, at TakeOver: New York, Sane competed in a fatal–four-way match for the NXT Women's Championship, however, she was unsuccessful in capturing the title as Baszler submitted Bianca Belair to retain. Just six days later, on April 11 (episode aired on tape delay on April 17), Sane lost a rematch to Baszler after Io Shirai attacked Baszler who was looking to injure Sane. Because of her loss, Sane is not allowed to challenge for the NXT Women's Championship anymore, which was a way to write her off the brand.

==== The Kabuki Warriors and WWE Ambassador (2019–2021) ====
On the April 16, 2019, episode of SmackDown Live, Paige announced that she would be managing a newly formed women's tag team, consisting of Sane, who as a result was drafted to the main roster, and Asuka. The team of Sane and Asuka, later dubbed "The Kabuki Warriors". At the Hell in a Cell, the Kabuki Warriors won the Women's Tag Team Championship from Alexa Bliss and Nikki Cross, after Asuka used the green mist on Cross. The next night on Raw, the Kabuki Warriors completed their transition into heels, as they cut a promo on both Becky Lynch and Charlotte Flair and went onto defeat them in a non-title match after once again using green mist. As part of the 2019 Draft in mid-October, Asuka and Sane were both drafted to the Raw brand. On the October 28, 2019, episode of Raw, the Kabuki Warriors turned on Paige and used the green mist on her. Asuka and Sane made their returns to NXT on the October 30 episode to defend the WWE Women's Tag Team Championship against Team Kick (Dakota Kai and Tegan Nox); marking the first time the titles were defended on NXT where they retained.

Sane represented Team Raw at Survivor Series in a 5-on-5-on-5 elimination tag team match, being eliminated by Sasha Banks. At Starrcade, the Kabuki Warriors successfully retained the tag team titles against Becky Lynch and Charlotte Flair, Alexa Bliss and Nikki Cross and Bayley and Sasha Banks when Asuka submitted Cross. Sane and Asuka then challenged Lynch and Flair to a WWE Women's Tag Team title match at TLC: Tables, Ladders & Chairs, which they accepted. At the event, the Kabuki Warriors retained their titles against Lynch and Flair in a Tables, Ladders and Chairs match; during the match, Sane suffered a legitmate concussion, which caused the remainder of the match to be changed on the fly. Sane made her TV return on the January 20 episode of Raw. On the March 2 episode of Raw, she returned to the ring in a losing effort against Shayna Baszler. On the first night of WrestleMania 36, the Kabuki Warriors lost their Women's Tag Team Championships to the team of Alexa Bliss and Nikki Cross, ending their reign at 181 days, the longest reign for the titles so far.

On the May 11, 2020, episode of Raw, then-Raw Women's Champion Becky Lynch vacated her title in order to take maternity leave, revealing that Asuka won the championship the night before by winning the Money in the Bank ladder match at the eponymous event. On the next episode of Raw, after Lynch's announcement, Sane was seen backstage with some of the other wrestlers congratulating Lynch, thus turning the Kabuki Warriors face as Sane celebrated Asuka's championship victory before being interrupted by Nia Jax, thus beginning a feud. On the June 6 episode of Raw, which was taped on May and aired on tape delay, Sane suffered a significant head cut. Sane made her televised return since her injury on the July 6 episode of Raw, as she challenged Sasha Banks in a match that ended in a disqualification due to Bayley's interference. Weeks after, the Kabuki Warriors unsuccessfully challenged Banks and Bayley for the WWE Women's Tag Team Championship. On the July 20 episode of Raw, she defeated SmackDown Women's Champion Bayley in a non-title match. The following week on Raw, Sane was viciously assaulted by Bayley backstage during the Raw Women's Championship match between Asuka and Banks. This was done to write her out of the storylines as Sane announced her departure from WWE on Twitter as she was heading back to Japan to be with her husband. WWE later confirmed Sane's departure on their website. On July 29, 2020, WWE's YouTube channel released a video chronicling Sane's last week in WWE.

On October 2, 2020, Sane announced that she had started working as an ambassador and trainer for WWE's branch in her native Japan. On October 25, she was part of the Japanese-language commentary team for the Hell in a Cell pay-per-view. In December 2021, she left WWE after her contract expired.

=== Return to World Wonder Ring Stardom (2022–2023) ===
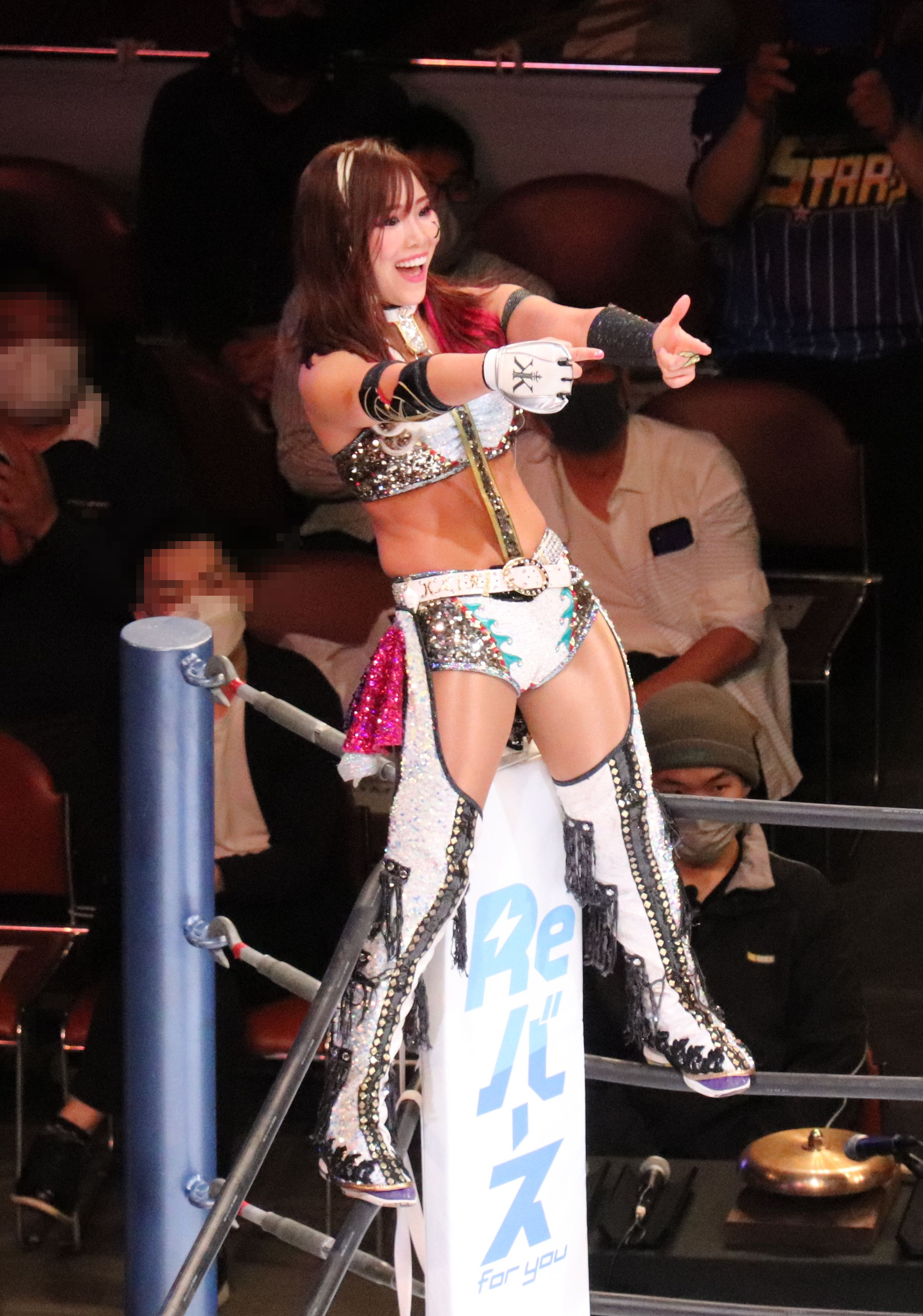
Kairi performing in Stardom in 2022

On February 18, 2022, Housako made her return to Stardom; going by the ring name Kairi. Her in-ring return was at World Climax event in March. At World Climax: The Best, she teamed with Mayu Iwatani and defeated Cosmic Angels (Tam Nakano and Unagi Sayaka) in a tag team match. At World Climax: The Top, she defeated Starlight Kid. She ruptured her eardrum during the match and revealed the injury in a post-match interview. She made her return on May 28 at Stardom Flashing Champions, where she teamed with Tam Nakano as "White Knights" to defeat Queen's Quest (Utami Hayashishita and Miyu Amasaki) in a tag team match.

In April 2023, the team of Kairi, Natsupoi and Saori Anou of REStart defeated Hiragi Kurumi, Risa Sera and Suzu Suzuki of Prominence for the Artist of Stardom Championship at Stardom All Star Grand Queendom. At Flashing Champions, REStart lost their title to the Baribari Bombers (Giulia, Mai Sakurai and Thekla), ending their reign at 34 days. Kairi's last match in Stardom was a six-woman tag team match at Stardom Nagoya Golden Fight.

=== New Japan Pro-Wrestling (2022–2023) ===
In November 2022, Kairi defeated Mayu Iwatani in the main event of Historic X-Over, a professional wrestling event co-promoted by Stardom and its sister promotion New Japan Pro-Wrestling (NJPW), to become the inaugural IWGP Women's Champion. In 2023, Kairi defended her title against Tam Nakano at Wrestle Kingdom 17. After the match, she was confronted and attacked by Mercedes Moné (formerly known as Sasha Banks). Moné then challenged Kairi to a title match at Battle in the Valley. At the event, Kairi was defeated by Moné; ending her reign at 90 days.

=== Return to WWE (2023–2026) ===
==== Damage CTRL (2023–2025) ====
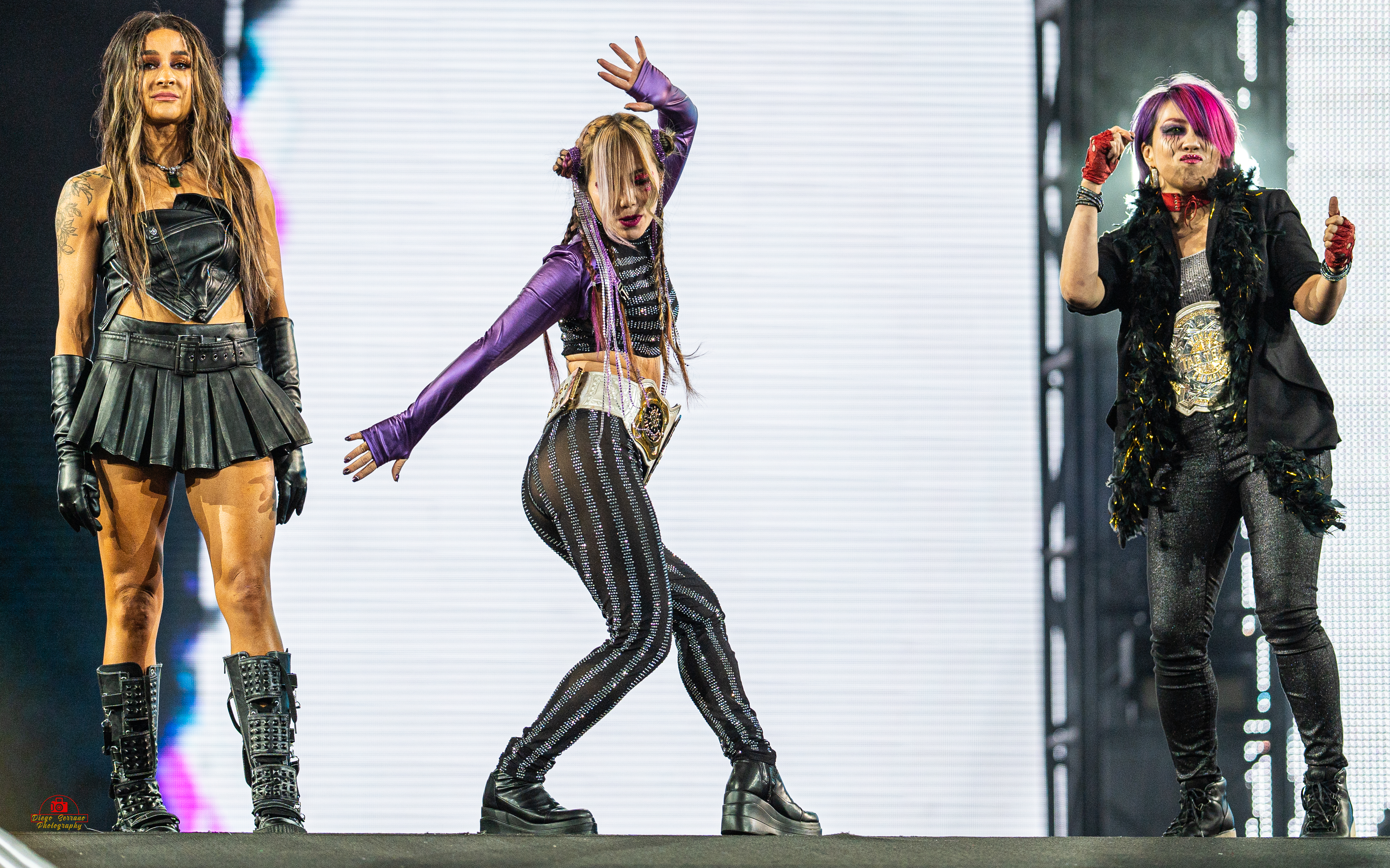
Damage CTRL make their entrance at WrestleMania XL in 2024

On March 24, 2023, Housako confirmed she became a free agent. On August 5, it was reported she has come to terms with WWE and would return to the company. On November 2, it was reported that she had been added to WWE's internal roster. She made her return at Crown Jewel reverting back to her WWE ring name Kairi Sane, and assisted Iyo Sky in retaining the WWE Women's Championship against Bianca Belair, re-establishing herself as a heel. On the following episode of SmackDown, Sane confronted Bayley and forgave her for her actions in 2020 and joined Damage CTRL. On the same episode, during a six-woman tag team match pitting Asuka with Belair and Charlotte Flair against Damage CTRL (Bayley, Sky and Sane), Asuka turned on her teammates to reunite with Sane while joining Damage CTRL at the same time (subsequently reforming the Kabuki Warriors). At Survivor Series WarGames, Damage CTRL lost to Belair, Flair, Becky Lynch, and Shotzi in a WarGames match.

On the January 26, 2024, episode of SmackDown, Sane and Asuka defeated Kayden Carter and Katana Chance to win the WWE Women's Tag Team Championships for the second time as a team and Sane's second time individually. Sane then competed in the 2024 Royal Rumble match entering the match at number 11, she eliminated Candice LeRae before being eliminated by Carter. At Elimination Chamber: Perth pre-show, Sane and Asuka defended their titles against the team of Indi Hartwell and LeRae. At NXT Roadblock, they defeated the team of Lyra Valkyria and Tatum Paxley to retain their titles. On Night 1 of WrestleMania XL, Damage CTRL (Sane, Asuka, and Kai) were defeated by Belair, Naomi, and Jade Cargill in a six-woman tag team match. During 2024 WWE Draft, Sane (as a part of Damage CTRL) was assigned to the Raw brand. At Backlash France, Sane and Asuka lost their titles to Belair and Cargill, ending their second reign at 99 days. On the July 29 episode of Raw, Sane and the rest of Damage CTRL turned face when they began feuding with Pure Fusion Collective (Baszler, Zoey Stark and Sonya Deville). She attempted to regain the titles at Crown Jewel, this time teaming with Iyo Sky, in a losing effort.

In January 2025, it was reported that Sane suffered an arm injury, however, in April 2025, Sane revealed on social media that the injury was not a arm injury but actually an torn thumb ligament in her hand that required surgery During her hiatus, Damage CTRL quietly disbanded after the release of Dakota Kai.

==== Kabuki Warriors reunion and departure (2025–2026) ====
On the May 19 episode of Raw, Sane made her return, where she failed to qualify for the Money in the Bank ladder match. On the following episode of Raw, Sane defeated Liv Morgan, marking her first televised singles victory in WWE since July 2020. On the July 7 episode of Raw, the Kabuki Warriors reunited after Asuka came to the aid of Sane from an attack by WWE Women's Tag Team Champions Raquel Rodriguez and Roxanne Perez. At Evolution, the Kabuki Warriors competed in a fatal four-way tag team match for the tag titles but they did not win. On the September 22 episode of Raw, after weeks of tension between Asuka, Iyo Sky and Rhea Ripley, both Sane and Asuka attacked Ripley and Sky, thus turning heel. At Crown Jewel on October 11, Sane and Asuka faced Sky and Ripley in a losing effort. On the November 10 episode of Raw, Sane and Asuka defeated Alexa Bliss and Charlotte Flair to win the WWE Women’s Tag Team Championship for the third time. At Survivor Series: WarGames on November 29, Sane along with Asuka, Nia Jax, Lash Legend and Becky Lynch lost to Ripley, Sky, Bliss, Flair and AJ Lee in a WarGames match.

On the January 5, 2026 episode of Raw, Sane and Asuka lost the titles to Ripley and Sky, ending their third reign at 56 days. At the Royal Rumble on January 31, Sane entered the match at number 28 eliminating Asuka before being eliminated by Iyo Sky. On April 20 on the Raw after WrestleMania 42, The Kabuki Warriors lost another match to Ripley and Sky in what would be Sane's last match in WWE. Four days later on April 24, it was reported that Sane was released by WWE.

=== Independent circuit (2026–present) ===
Kairi made her first post-WWE appearance since her release at the Chris Jericho's Rock 'N' Wrestling Rager at Sea on November 10, 2026.

== Legacy ==
In 2016, Dave Meltzer of the Wrestling Observer Newsletter referred to Housako and her fellow Japanese wrestlers Io Shirai and Mayu Iwatani as "three of the best wrestlers in the world".

== Other media ==
=== Video games ===
Year	Title	Notes	Ref.
2019	WWE 2K19	Video game debut	
2020	WWE 2K20	—N/a	
2024	WWE 2K24	"Global Superstars Pack" DLC	
2025	WWE 2K25	—N/a	
2026	WWE 2K26	—N/a	

== Personal life ==
Housako married on February 22, 2020. In January 2022, Housako opened a 24-hour gym called "PARA-FIT24" inside Shōnan-Enoshima Station in Kanagawa, Japan.

== Filmography ==
=== Film ===
- 2012: Sūpu～Umarekawari no Monogatari～ (スープ～生まれ変わりの物語～)

=== Television ===
- 2011: Zenigata Kintarō (銭形金太郎)
- 2012: Waratte Iitomo! (マッスルビーナス)
- 2012: Gachigase (ガチガセ)
- 2013: Sekai Fushigi Hakken (世界ふしぎ発見)
- 2014: Nakai Masahiro no Mininaru Toshokan (中居正広のミになる図書館)
- 2015: Naruhodo! Haisukūru (なるほど！ハイスクール)

== Championships and accomplishments ==
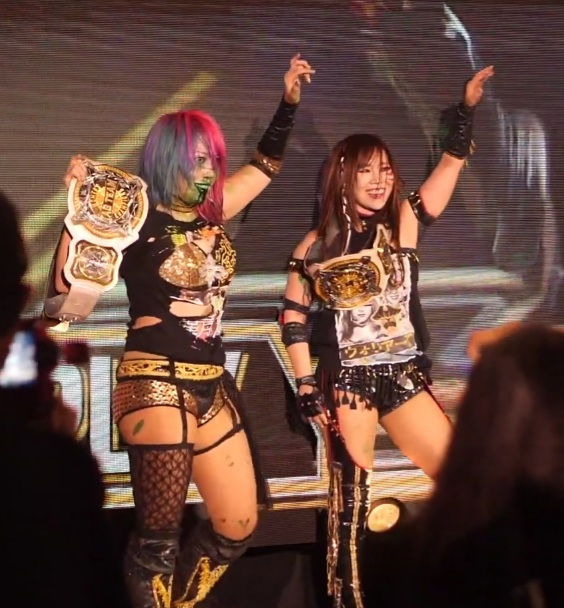
The Kabuki Warriors (Kairi Sane (right) and Asuka (left)) as the WWE Women's Tag Team Champions in their first reign

- New Japan Pro-Wrestling
  - IWGP Women's Championship (1 time, inaugural)
  - IWGP Women's Championship Tournament (2022)
- Pro Wrestling Illustrated
  - Ranked No. 10 of the top 100 female wrestlers in the PWI Women's 100 in 2017 and 2018
  - Ranked No. 9 of the top 50 tag teams in the PWI Tag Team 50 in 2020 with Asuka
- Sports Illustrated
  - Ranked No. 8 in the top 10 women's wrestlers in 2018 – tied with Shayna Baszler
- World Wonder Ring Stardom
  - Artist of Stardom Championship (5 times) – with Kaori Yoneyama and Yuhi (1), Chelsea and Koguma (1), Io Shirai and Mayu Iwatani (1), Hiromi Mimura and Konami (1), and Natsupoi and Saori Anou (1)
  - Goddesses of Stardom Championship (3 times) – with Natsumi Showzuki (1), Nanae Takahashi (1), and Yoko Bito (1)
  - Wonder of Stardom Championship (1 time)
  - World of Stardom Championship (1 time)
  - Goddesses of Stardom Tag League – with Nanae Takahashi (2014) and Yoko Bito (2016)
  - World of Stardom Championship Tournament (2015)
  - 5★Star GP (2015)
  - 5★Star GP Award (2 times)
    - 5★Star GP Best Match Award (2014) vs. Nanae Takahashi on August 24
    - 5★Star GP Best Match Award (2016) vs. Io Shirai on September 3
  - Stardom Year-End Awards (7 times)
    - Best Match Award (2014) with Nanae Takahashi vs. Risa Sera and Takumi Iroha on December 23
    - Best Tag Team Award (2014) with Nanae Takahashi
    - Best Tag Team Award (2016) with Yoko Bito
    - Best Technique Award (2016)
    - MVP Award (2015)
    - Outstanding Performance Award (2013, 2015)
- WWE
  - NXT Women's Championship (1 time)
  - WWE Women's Tag Team Championship (3 times) – with Asuka
  - Mae Young Classic (2017)
  - NXT Year-End Award (2 times)
    - Female Competitor of the Year (2018)
    - Overall Competitor of the Year (2018)
  - WWE Year-End Award (1 time)
    - Women's Tag Team of the Year (2019) – with Asuka
