= NXT TakeOver: Brooklyn 4 =

2018 WWE Network event

- Promotional poster featuring Johnny Gargano, Tommaso Ciampa, Shayna Baszler, and Kairi Sane
- Promotion: WWE
- Brand: NXT
- Date: August 18, 2018
- City: Brooklyn, New York
- Venue: Barclays Center
- Attendance: 14,676

WWE event chronology
← Previous; Extreme Rules	Next → SummerSlam

NXT TakeOver chronology
← Previous; Chicago II	Next → WarGames

NXT TakeOver: Brooklyn chronology
← Previous; III	Next → Last

NXT TakeOver: Brooklyn 4 was a 2018 professional wrestling livestreaming event produced by WWE, held exclusively for wrestlers from the promotion's developmental brand, NXT. It was the 21st NXT TakeOver event and the fourth annual and final TakeOver: Brooklyn. It took place on August 18, 2018, at the Barclays Center in Brooklyn, New York and aired exclusively on the WWE Network. The event was held as part of that year's SummerSlam weekend, and was the fourth and final consecutive TakeOver: Brooklyn event to take place at the arena.

Seven matches were contested at the event, including two taped for the August 22 episode of NXT. In the main event, Tommaso Ciampa defeated Johnny Gargano in a Last Man Standing match to retain the NXT Championship. In other prominent matches, Kairi Sane defeated Shayna Baszler to win the NXT Women's Championship, and Ricochet defeated Adam Cole to win the NXT North American Championship.

== Production ==
=== Background ===
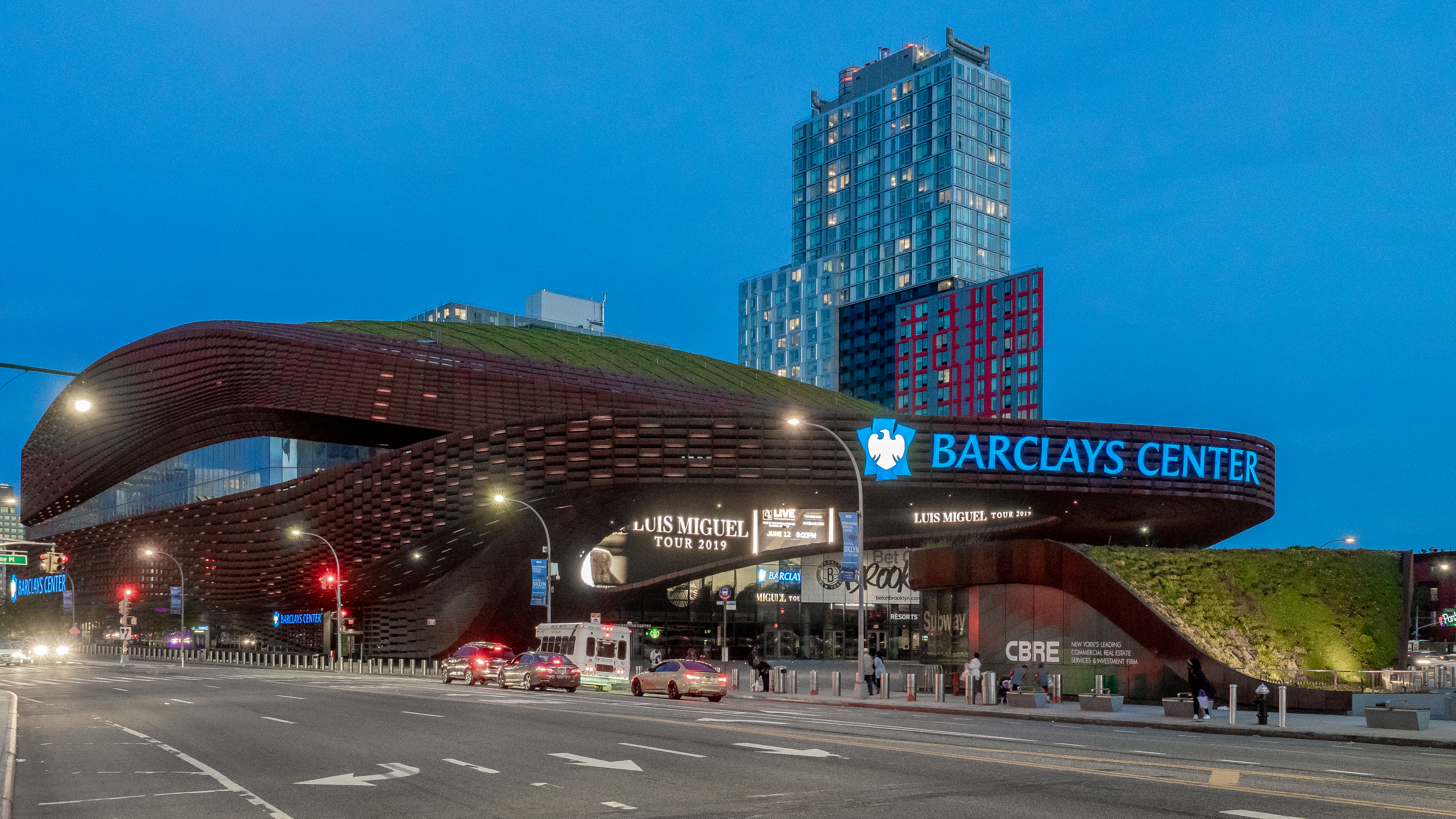
The 21st NXT TakeOver event was the fourth annual and final TakeOver: Brooklyn held at the Barclays Center in Brooklyn, New York; one further TakeOver would be held here in 2019, but not as part of the TakeOver: Brooklyn subseries.

TakeOver was a series of professional wrestling events that began in May 2014, as WWE's developmental brand, NXT, held its second WWE Network-exclusive livestreaming event, billed as TakeOver. The "TakeOver" moniker subsequently became the branding for all of NXT's major events held periodically throughout the year. TakeOver: Brooklyn was an annual subseries of TakeOver events that began in 2015 and were held at the Barclays Center in Brooklyn, New York as a support show for WWE's annual SummerSlam for the main roster at the same venue. Announced on August 14, 2017, Brooklyn 4 was scheduled as the 21st TakeOver event and was held on Saturday, August 18, 2018, as a support show for that year's SummerSlam.

=== Storylines ===
The card included matches that resulted from scripted storylines. Results were predetermined by WWE's writers on the NXT brand, while storylines were produced on WWE's weekly television program, NXT.

On the July 18 episode of NXT, Kairi Sane defeated Candice LeRae and Nikki Cross in a triple threat match to become the number one contender for the NXT Women's Championship and would face Shayna Baszler for the title at TakeOver: Brooklyn 4.

On the July 25 episode of NXT, Ricochet confronted Adam Cole after his match with Sean Maluta. Ricochet then challenged Cole to a match at TakeOver: Brooklyn 4 for the North American Championship, but Cole refused. The following week, a match between Cole and Ricochet for the title was scheduled for TakeOver: Brooklyn 4.

On June 26 at the NXT U.K. Championship event, Moustache Mountain (Tyler Bate and Trent Seven) defeated The Undisputed Era's Kyle O'Reilly and Roderick Strong to capture the NXT Tag Team Championship. On the June 27 episode of NXT, The Undisputed Era defeated Moustache Mountain and Ricochet. Two weeks later, a rematch between the two teams for the titles was scheduled, with The Undisputed Era recapturing the titles. On the August 1 episode of NXT, a tag team match between the two teams for the titles was scheduled for TakeOver: Brooklyn 4.

On June 26 at the NXT U.K. Championship, EC3 and Velveteen Dream teamed up and were defeated by Aleister Black and Ricochet after Dream left the ring during the match. On the August 1 episode of NXT, a match between the two was scheduled for TakeOver: Brooklyn 4.

On the July 25 episode of NXT, Tommaso Ciampa defeated Aleister Black to capture the NXT Championship due to interference from Johnny Gargano. The following week, as Black approached the ring to confront Ciampa, Gargano ran past Black and attacked Ciampa. Black then attacked Gargano. The following week, Ciampa attacked Black and Gargano during their scheduled match. A match between the three for the title was scheduled for TakeOver: Brooklyn 4. After the show was over, Black was later found unconscious in the parking lot of Full Sail Live. With Black out of action after a groin injury, the match was changed to a Last Man Standing match between Ciampa and Gargano.

== Event ==
Other on-screen personnel
Role:	Name:
English commentators	Mauro Ranallo
English commentators	Nigel McGuinness
English commentators	Percy Watson
Spanish commentators	Carlos Cabrera
Spanish commentators	Marcelo Rodríguez
Ring announcer	Kayla Braxton
Referees	Drake Wuertz
Referees	Eddie Orengo
Referees	Darryl Sharma
Referees	Jessika Carr
Pre-show panel	Charly Caruso
Pre-show panel	Sam Roberts
Pre-show panel	Pat McAfee

=== Preliminary matches ===
The event opened with The Undisputed Era (Kyle O'Reilly and Roderick Strong) defending the NXT Tag Team Championship against Moustache Mountain (Tyler Bate and Trent Seven). O'Reilly and Strong performed "Total Elimination" on Seven to retain the titles. After the match, The War Raiders (Hanson and Rowe) attacked Strong and O'Reilly, ending the attack by performing "Fallout" on O'Reilly.

Next, EC3 faced The Velveteen Dream. In the end, Dream executed a cartwheel Death Valley driver and a "Purple Rainmaker" on EC3 on the ring apron to win the match.

After that, Adam Cole defended the NXT North American Championship against Ricochet. After an even match between the two, Cole intercepted a springboard moonsault attempt by Cole into a superkick and followed up with an Ushigoroshi for a nearfall. The two then traded blows, with Cole falling onto Ricochet for a nearfall. In the climax, Ricochet attempted a 630° senton on Cole, but Cole rolled out of the ring, only for Ricochet to leap over the top rope to perform a hurricanrana on Cole. Back in the ring, Ricochet performed the 630° senton to win the title.

In the penultimate match, Shayna Baszler defended the NXT Women's Championship against Kairi Sane. Throughout the match, Baszler focused on injuring Sane's leg. Sane was able to perform an Insane Elbow to the back of Baszler and looked for another, but Baszler rolled out of the ring. Sane then performed a diving crossbody on Baszler and followed up with a second Insane Elbow on Baszler for a nearfall. Baszler applied the "Kirifuda Clutch" on Sane, who touched the ropes to break the submission. In the closing moments, Sane performed an Alabama Slam on Baszler and looked for a third Insane Elbow, but Baszler countered and applied the "Kirifuda Clutch". However, Sane countered into a roll-up to win the title.

=== Main event ===
In the main event, Tommaso Ciampa defended the NXT Championship against Johnny Gargano in a Last Man Standing match. Ciampa performed an "Air Raid Crash" on Gargano through an announce table, who stood at a nine count. Ciampa performed three "Project Ciampas" on Gargano, however, Gargano stood up at a nine count. Gargano performed a superkick on Ciampa, who was seated on a chair. Ciampa performed a lifting double underhook facebuster on Gargano onto the steel steps but Gargano stood at a nine count. Gargano performed a slingshot DDT on Ciampa onto the exposed floorboards, but Ciampa stood at a nine count. Ciampa performed a running knee smash using a chair through the barricade on Gargano and buried Gargano under rubble from the timekeeper’s area, only for Gargano to stand up at a nine count once again. Gargano performed a superkick on Ciampa, who fell through two tables on the exposed concrete, however, Ciampa used a crutch to stand at a nine count. On the stage, Gargano threw Ciampa into the LED screen and applied the "Garga-No-Escape". Gargano used handcuffs to bind Ciampa to the stage and began to perform superkicks on Ciampa. In the climax, Gargano performed a running knee smash on Ciampa, but fell from the stage onto some cases of production equipment. Ciampa rolled off the stage at the count of nine, with the handcuffs holding him up on his feet to beat the count. Gargano could not stand up by a ten count, thus Ciampa retained the title. After the match, medical personnel tended to Gargano as Ciampa silently taunted him with the belt.

== Aftermath ==
The August 29 episode of NXT began with Johnny Gargano addressing his loss to NXT Champion Tommaso Ciampa, only to be interrupted by NXT General Manager William Regal, who demanded to know who attacked Aleister Black. Velveteen Dream entered the proceedings, stating that Wednesday night's show was not about Gargano and challenged him to a match for the following week, which was made official. On that subsequent episode, Dream defeated Gargano. Black's attacker was later revealed to be Gargano himself on the October 24 episode of NXT. The following week, a match between Gargano and Black was made official for TakeOver: WarGames.

On the September 5 episode of NXT, after NXT Women's Champion Kairi Sane successfully won her match, she was confronted by Shayna Baszler, who said that she would be coming back for her title. A brawl between the two ensued, with Sane getting the better of it. The following week, Baszler defeated an enhancement talent to send a message to Sane. On the September 26 episode, it was confirmed that Sane would defend the title against Baszler at the first all-women's pay-per-view event, Evolution.

Brooklyn 4 would be the final in the TakeOver: Brooklyn chronology. Although TakeOver: New York the following year was also held at the Barclays Center, it did not continue the Brooklyn chronology, and was instead held in April as a support show for WrestleMania 35. It was also named after the U.S. state instead of the city.

== Results ==
No.	Results	Stipulations	Times
1^{N}	Bianca Belair defeated Deonna Purrazzo by pinfall	Singles match	5:38
2^{N}	Pete Dunne (c) defeated Zack Gibson by pinfall	Singles match for the WWE United Kingdom Championship	13:34
3	The Undisputed Era (Kyle O'Reilly and Roderick Strong) (c) defeated Moustache Mountain (Trent Seven and Tyler Bate) by pinfall	Tag team match for the NXT Tag Team Championship	18:06
4	Velveteen Dream defeated EC3 by pinfall	Singles match	15:03
5	Ricochet defeated Adam Cole (c) by pinfall	Singles match for the NXT North American Championship	15:19
6	Kairi Sane defeated Shayna Baszler (c) by pinfall	Singles match for the NXT Women's Championship	13:37
7	Tommaso Ciampa (c) defeated Johnny Gargano	Last Man Standing match for the NXT Championship	33:42
(c) / – the champion(s) heading into the match; N / – the match was taped for a future broadcast of NXT
