= NXT TakeOver: New York =

2019 WWE Network event

- Promotional poster featuring various WWE wrestlers
- Promotion: WWE
- Brand: NXT
- Date: April 5, 2019
- City: Brooklyn, New York
- Venue: Barclays Center
- Attendance: 15,697

WWE event chronology
← Previous; Fastlane	Next → WrestleMania 35

NXT TakeOver chronology
← Previous; Phoenix	Next → XXV

NXT TakeOver: New York was a 2019 professional wrestling livestreaming event produced by WWE, held for wrestlers from the promotion's developmental brand, NXT. It was the 24th NXT TakeOver event and took place on April 5, 2019, at the Barclays Center in Brooklyn, New York. It was held as part of the WrestleMania 35 weekend festivities and aired exclusively on the WWE Network. This was the fifth NXT TakeOver held at the venue, after four consecutive TakeOver: Brooklyn events from 2015 to 2018.

Eight matches were contested at the event, including three taped for the April 10 episode of NXT. In the main event, Johnny Gargano defeated Adam Cole in a two out of three falls match to win the vacant NXT Championship. In other prominent matches, Walter defeated Pete Dunne to win NXT UK's WWE United Kingdom Championship, ending Dunne's reign at 685 days, Shayna Baszler retained the NXT Women's Championship in a fatal four-way match, Velveteen Dream ended Matt Riddle's undefeated streak and retained the NXT North American Championship, and in the opening bout, War Raiders (Hanson and Rowe) retained the NXT Tag Team Championship against Dusty Rhodes Tag Team Classic winners, Aleister Black and Ricochet.

== Production ==
=== Background ===
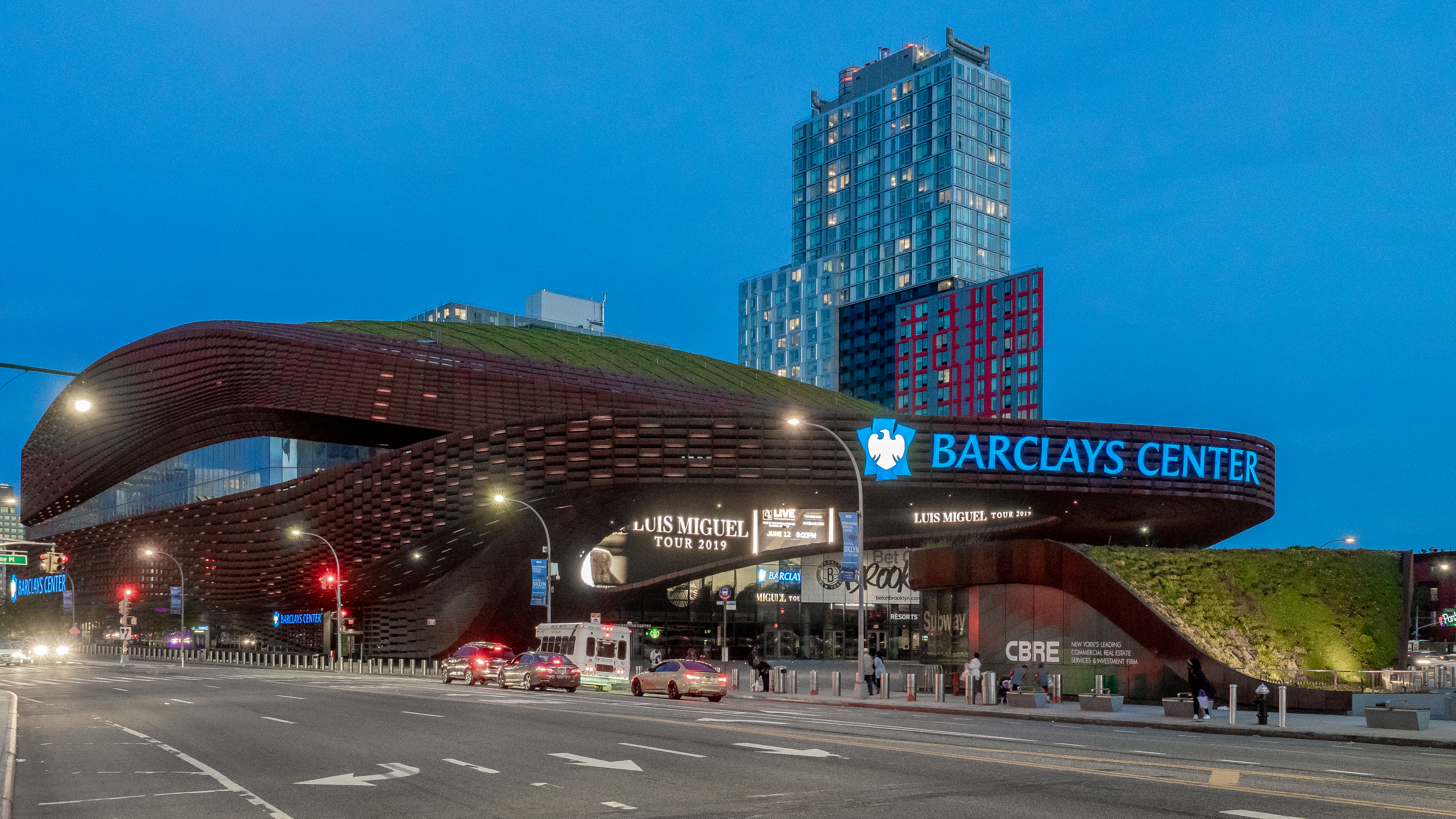
The 24th NXT TakeOver event was held at the Barclays Center in Brooklyn, New York, and was the fifth TakeOver overall held at the venue, after four consecutive TakeOver: Brooklyn events from 2015 to 2018.

TakeOver was a series of professional wrestling events that began in May 2014, as WWE's developmental brand, NXT, held its second WWE Network-exclusive livestreaming event, billed as TakeOver. The "TakeOver" moniker subsequently became the branding for all of NXT's major events held periodically throughout the year. On March 15, 2018, it was announced that WrestleMania 35 for the main roster would be held at MetLife Stadium in East Rutherford, New Jersey, with the event's associated TakeOver being held at the Barclays Center in Brooklyn, New York on Saturday, April 5, 2019. This 24th TakeOver event was in turn titled TakeOver: New York and was the first TakeOver named after the U.S. state instead of the host city. Tickets went on sale December 7, 2018, through Ticketmaster. The official theme songs for the event were "You Should See Me in a Crown" by Billie Eilish and "Are You Ready" by Disturbed.

NXT previously held an annual subseries of TakeOver events titled TakeOver: Brooklyn from 2015 to 2018, which were each held at the Barclays Center and were support shows for WWE's annual SummerSlam in August. Although TakeOver: New York was held at the same venue, it did not continue the TakeOver: Brooklyn name and is not considered as part of that subseries.

=== Storylines ===
The card included matches that resulted from scripted storylines. Results were predetermined by WWE's writers on the NXT brand, while storylines were produced on WWE's weekly television program, NXT.

The fourth annual Dusty Rhodes Tag Team Classic was won by Aleister Black and Ricochet, who defeated The Forgotten Sons (Steve Cutler and Wesley Blake) in the final. This also earned them an NXT Tag Team Championship match against the War Raiders (Hanson and Rowe) at TakeOver: New York.

In the Dusty Rhodes Tag Team Classic, Johnny Gargano decided to team up once again with former friend and bitter rival, NXT Champion Tommaso Ciampa, reforming #DIY. After losing to Black and Ricochet in the semifinals, Ciampa was about to turn on Gargano again, but Gargano was prepared and turned the attack around. On the March 20 episode of NXT, Triple H revealed that Gargano was supposed to face Ciampa at TakeOver: New York for the NXT title, but those plans halted due to the real life situation of Ciampa needing neck surgery, thus forcing him to vacate the title. Triple H then stated Gargano would still be in the match, and The Undisputed Era's Adam Cole won a fatal five-way against Velveteen Dream, Matt Riddle, Aleister Black, and Ricochet to fight for the vacant title. Triple H also announced that, in order to get a definitive winner, the match would be a two out of three falls match.

After winning the Worlds Collide tournament during Royal Rumble Axxess for a championship match of his choosing, Velveteen Dream defeated Johnny Gargano for the NXT North American Championship. Over the next few weeks, Dream had run-ins with Matt Riddle, who fantasized about what the championship would look like around his waist. After weeks of head games, it was eventually announced that Dream would defend the title against Riddle at TakeOver: New York.

At TakeOver: Phoenix, Shayna Baszler retained the NXT Women's Championship against Bianca Belair by technical submission. During the match, Belair also had to deal with outside interference from Baszler's friends, former Ultimate Fighting Championship Horsewomen, Jessamyn Duke and Marina Shafir. This led to a match with Belair teaming with Io Shirai and Kairi Sane against the three women, and resulted in Shirai pinning Baszler. Belair, however, was not pleased as she wanted the pin and another shot at Baszler's title. During a match for a title shot at TakeOver: New York, both Shirai and Belair were attacked by Baszler, who also choked out an assisting Sane. As she was leaving the building, Baszler was informed that, due to her actions, she would be defending her title against Belair, Shirai, and Sane in a fatal four-way match.

At NXT UK TakeOver: Blackpool, after Pete Dunne's successful WWE United Kingdom Championship defense, Walter made his NXT UK debut and confronted Dunne. On February 23, a title match between Dunne and Walter was scheduled for TakeOver: New York.

== Event ==
Other on-screen personnel
Role:	Name:
English commentators	Mauro Ranallo
English commentators	Nigel McGuinness
English commentators	Percy Watson
English commentators	Vic Joseph (UK Championship match)
Spanish commentators	Carlos Cabrera
Spanish commentators	Marcelo Rodríguez
Spanish commentators	Jerry Soto
Ring announcer	Kayla Braxton
Referees	Drake Wuertz
Referees	Eddie Orengo
Referees	Darryl Sharma
Referees	D.A. Brewer
Interviewer	Sarah Schreiber
Pre-show panel	Charly Caruso
Pre-show panel	Sam Roberts
Pre-show panel	Pat McAfee

=== Taped matches ===
Before the event went live on the WWE Network, three matches took place that were taped for the April 10 episode of NXT. In the first match, Candice LeRae took on Aliyah. LeRae performed a Lionsault on Aliyah to win the match.

In the second match, Danny Burch (accompanied by Oney Lorcan) took on Jaxson Ryker (accompanied by Wesley Blake and Steve Cutler). Ryker performed a Sitout Uranage on Burch to win the match.

In the third match, The Street Profits (Angelo Dawkins and Montez Ford) took on Fabian Aichner and Marcel Barthel. The Street Profits performed an Electric Chair Blockbuster on Barthel to win the match.

=== Preliminary matches ===
The actual event began with The War Raiders (Hanson and Rowe) defending the NXT Tag Team Championship against Aleister Black and Ricochet. Hanson and Rowe performed Fallout on Ricochet to retain the titles.

Next, The Velveteen Dream defended the NXT North American Championship against Matt Riddle. Dream pinned Riddle with a roll up to retain the title.

After that, Pete Dunne defended the WWE United Kingdom Championship against Walter. Walter performed a Diving Splash on Dunne to win the title; this ended Dunne's record title reign at 685 days.

In the penultimate match, Shayna Baszler defended the NXT Women's Championship against Kairi Sane, Bianca Belair and Io Shirai. After Belair performed a double Kiss of Death on Shirai and Sane, Baszler applied the Kirifuda clutch on Belair, who submitted, to retain the title.

=== Main event ===
In the main event, Johnny Gargano and Adam Cole competed in a two out of three falls match for the vacant NXT Championship. Cole performed a Last Shot on Gargano to win the first fall. Cole performed a second Last Shot on Gargano for a nearfall. Gargano forced Cole to submit to the Garga-No-Escape to win the second fall. Gargano performed a Slingshot DDT on Cole for a nearfall. Cole performed a Panama Sunrise on Gargano for a nearfall. Cole performed a Fairytale Ending on an announce table on Gargano. Back in the ring, Cole performed a Superkick on Gargano for a nearfall. Gargano applied the Garga-No-Escape but The Undisputed Era (Bobby Fish, Kyle O'Reilly and Roderick Strong) appeared. O'Reilly attacked Gargano with an eye rake and Cole pushed Gargano into the referee. Fish and O'Reilly performed Total Elimination on Gargano and Cole scored a nearfall. Gargano performed a Back Body Drop onto Fish, O'Reilly and Strong on Cole and threw Strong into the ring post. Gargano performed a Superkick on Fish and a Tornado DDT off the ring apron on O'Reilly. As Gargano returned to the ring, Cole performed two Superkicks and a third Last Shot on Gargano for a nearfall. In the closing moments, Cole attempted another Last Shot, but Gargano avoided it and applied the Garga-No-Escape. Cole tried to make it to the bottom rope, but Gargano brought him to the middle of the ring and forced him to submit to win the third fall and the title.

After the match, Candice LeRae, Gargano's wife, appeared to celebrate with Gargano. Tommaso Ciampa, the former NXT Champion, appeared and congratulated Gargano. Gargano celebrated with LeRae and Ciampa as the event ended.

== Reception ==
The event received widespread acclaim. Jake St-Pierre of 411Mania rated the event a perfect 10/10 rating. He described it by saying, "It's getting to the point where I don't know which TakeOver event stands out the most, but I'll be damned if New York didn't throw its hat in the ring with authority".

Dave Meltzer of the Wrestling Observer Newsletter awarded, out of five stars, 4.5 stars for both the NXT Tag Team Championship and the North American Championship matches, 4.75 stars to the Walter-Dunne match, 3.75 stars to the Women's Championship match (the only match of the event below four stars), and 5.5 stars to the Gargano-Cole match.

The Gargano-Cole match would later win the NXT Year-End Award for Match of the Year.

== Aftermath ==
On the April 17 episode of NXT, Johnny Gargano talked about his NXT Championship win, but Adam Cole (along with Bobby Fish and Kyle O'Reilly) called him the "uncrowned champion" of NXT, since Cole won the first fall at TakeOver: New York. Gargano then mocked Cole's "bay bay" catchphrase. Afterwards, Strong attacked Gargano from behind, and Cole, Fish, and O'Reilly joined the beatdown. The following week, Gargano defeated Strong due to an untimely assist by Cole. On the May 15 episode, a singles match between Cole and Gargano for the NXT Championship was made official for NXT TakeOver: XXV.

The rivalry between Kairi Sane and NXT Women's Champion Shayna Baszler ended on the April 17 episode of NXT, where they battled for the title under the stipulation that Sane could no longer challenge for the title if she loses. Throughout the match, Baszler focused on injuring Sane's arm. In the end, Io Shirai shoved Baszler, who won via disqualification to retain the title. Afterwards, Baszler's Horsewomen stablemates, Jessamyn Duke and Marina Shafir, dragged Shirai out of the ring and forced her to watch as Baszler stomped on Sane's injured arm. This would be Sane's final NXT appearance, as she was drafted to SmackDown during the 2019 WWE Superstar Shake-up. After several more weeks of feuding, a match between Shirai and Baszler for the NXT Women's Championship would later be scheduled for NXT TakeOver: XXV.

On the May 1 episode of NXT UK, after WWE United Kingdom Champion Walter won his match, he was confronted by Pete Dunne, who wanted another shot at the title. The match was scheduled for the May 22 episode, where Walter retained after interference from Fabian Aichner and Marcel Barthel. After the match, Aichner and Barthel sided with Walter, reuniting Ringkampf under the new name Imperium.

== Results ==
No.	Results	Stipulations	Times
1^{N}	Candice LeRae defeated Aliyah (with Vanessa Borne) by pinfall	Singles match	4:09
2^{N}	Jaxson Ryker (with Steve Cutler and Wesley Blake) defeated Danny Burch (with Oney Lorcan) by pinfall	Singles match	3:08
3^{N}	The Street Profits (Angelo Dawkins and Montez Ford) defeated Fabian Aichner and Marcel Barthel by pinfall	Tag team match	—
4	War Raiders (Hanson and Rowe) (c) defeated Aleister Black and Ricochet by pinfall	Tag team match for the NXT Tag Team Championship	18:50
5	Velveteen Dream (c) defeated Matt Riddle by pinfall	Singles match for the NXT North American Championship	17:35
6	Walter defeated Pete Dunne (c) by pinfall	Singles match for the WWE United Kingdom Championship	25:40
7	Shayna Baszler (c) defeated Bianca Belair, Io Shirai, and Kairi Sane by submission	Fatal four-way match for the NXT Women's Championship	15:45
8	Johnny Gargano defeated Adam Cole 2–1	Two out of three falls match for the vacant NXT Championship	38:25
(c) / – the champion(s) heading into the match; N / – the match was taped for a future broadcast of NXT

=== Dusty Rhodes Tag Team Classic bracket ===
The fourth edition of the Dusty Rhodes Tag Team Classic began on the March 6, 2019, episode of NXT and culminated on the March 27 episode. This single-elimination tournament consisted of eight tag teams. In the tournament final, Aleister Black and Ricochet defeated The Forgotten Sons (Steve Cutler and Wesley Blake).

2019 Dusty Rhodes Tag Team Classic bracket

First round NXT; February 20, 2019 (Aired: March 6)
Moustache Mountain (Trent Seven and Tyler Bate)	Pinfall
Street Profits (Angelo Dawkins and Montez Ford)	7:22
Oney Lorcan and Danny Burch	8:23
The Forgotten Sons (Steve Cutler and Wesley Blake)	Pinfall
#DIY (Tommaso Ciampa and Johnny Gargano)	Pinfall
The Undisputed Era (Kyle O'Reilly and Bobby Fish)	14:01
Aleister Black and Ricochet	Pinfall
Fabian Aichner and Marcel Barthel	8:17

Semifinals; NXT; February 20, 2019 (Aired: March 13)
Moustache Mountain	9:38
The Forgotten Sons	Pinfall
#DIY	13:27
Aleister Black and Ricochet	Pinfall

Final; NXT; March 13, 2019 (Aired: March 27)
The Forgotten Sons	14:24
Aleister Black and Ricochet	Pinfall
