= NXT TakeOver =

WWE pay-per-view and livestreaming event series (2014–2021)

- NXT TakeOver logo
- Created by: Paul "Triple H" Levesque
- Promotion: WWE
- Brand: NXT
- First event: TakeOver (May 2014)
- Last event: TakeOver 36 (August 2021)

NXT TakeOver was a series of periodic professional wrestling events produced by the American promotion WWE for its NXT brand division. The first TakeOver was simply titled TakeOver and was held in May 2014 as the brand's second major live event, after Arrival in February. TakeOver subsequently became the name for NXT's major events that were held several times a year. Beginning with the second event, TakeOver: Fatal 4-Way, many events included a subtitle, which either revived old WWE event names or were named after the event's location, some of which occurred annually, but some of the later ones were simply titled by their installment number. A total of 36 TakeOver events were held from May 2014 to August 2021.

The events were originally livestreamed exclusively on the WWE Network until TakeOver 31 in October 2020, when the events also became available on traditional pay-per-view before also becoming available on Peacock beginning with TakeOver: Stand & Deliver in April 2021. The TakeOver series came to an end following TakeOver 36 in August 2021, as in September, NXT was restructured with the brand's succeeding events no longer carrying the TakeOver name, including some former TakeOver events, such as Stand & Deliver, which has since been held as NXT's WrestleMania week event.

With the establishment of NXT UK in 2018—a sister brand of NXT based in the United Kingdom—the brand adopted the TakeOver name for its live events.

== History ==
In 2012, WWE restructured their NXT brand from being a reality-based competition television show to a developmental territory for their main roster. In February 2014, the brand held its first live special that was uniquely titled Arrival, which was also the very first event to air live on WWE's online streaming service, the WWE Network, which launched earlier that same month. However, after NXT held an event titled TakeOver in May that year, the "TakeOver" name became the branding for all NXT live specials. All NXT live specials were initially held at Full Sail University in Winter Park, Florida, as with the main NXT series. They were also originally exclusive to the WWE Network until TakeOver 31 in October 2020 when they also became available on traditional pay-per-view (PPV), before also becoming available on Peacock after the American version of the WWE Network merged under Peacock in March 2021.

Beginning with TakeOver: Brooklyn in 2015, the events were held at various U.S. and international locations, with most TakeOvers being named after their host city or U.S. state, which also began with that Brooklyn event. Due to the COVID-19 pandemic, however, all NXT events returned to Full Sail University in mid-March 2020 until TakeOver 31 that October, when events were moved to the WWE Performance Center in Orlando, Florida, presented as a virtual fan viewing experience with a small live crowd called the "Capitol Wrestling Center", an homage to the Capitol Wrestling Corporation, the predecessor to WWE. The Capitol Wrestling Center was similar to the WWE ThunderDome, which was a bio-secure bubble that the company utilized for Raw and SmackDown's programs. Most COVID restrictions were lifted in mid-2021 with the events no longer including a virtual audience and resumed having a live audience. Although the Raw and SmackDown brands resumed live touring in July 2021, NXT remained at the Capitol Wrestling Center. As TakeOvers were only held in Florida since the start of the pandemic in March 2020, they were named either by their installment number (e.g., TakeOver 31) or revived old WWE pay-per-view names (e.g., TakeOver: In Your House), with the exception of TakeOver: WarGames that year.

Since TakeOver: Brooklyn in 2015, several TakeOver events were scheduled as a support event for each of WWE's "Big Four" pay-per-view events at the time (Royal Rumble, WrestleMania, SummerSlam, and Survivor Series), and occasionally, their other monthly pay-per-views, such as Backlash and Money in the Bank. Before the COVID-19 pandemic, TakeOvers also shared the same venue as those PPVs, except when those PPVs were held in a stadium; in these cases, TakeOver was held at an arena in the same city instead. There were also recurring subseries of TakeOver events; TakeOver: Brooklyn was also the first to have its own subseries of TakeOvers. Other subseries of TakeOvers included Toronto, Chicago, In Your House, and the most prominent, WarGames, which had been held on the night preceding Survivor Series from 2017 to 2019; in 2020, it was held two weeks after Survivor Series. The event featured the namesake WarGames match as its main event. TakeOver: Stand & Deliver in April 2021 was the only TakeOver held across two nights.

Only one NXT TakeOver event had to be canceled. TakeOver: Tampa Bay was originally set to air live from the Amalie Arena in Tampa, Florida on April 4, 2020. The event was initially postponed due to the COVID-19 pandemic, which began effecting WWE's programming in mid-March; however, it was ultimately canceled with matches planned and scheduled for the event moved to weekly episodes of NXT, beginning April 1.

In September 2021, the NXT brand went through a restructuring, being rebranded as "NXT 2.0", reverting to a developmental territory for WWE. In October, it was speculated that the company may end the TakeOver series as another TakeOver event was not scheduled for 2021 after TakeOver 36 in August. On November 9, 2021, NXT's next PPV and livestreaming event was announced as WarGames to be held on December 5, 2021. Unlike the previous WarGames events, however, the announcement confirmed that the event would not be a TakeOver event, thus ending the TakeOver series. Vengeance Day, Stand & Deliver, and In Your House would also continue on as their own events following TakeOver's discontinuation, although the 2022 Vengeance Day aired as a television special instead of airing on PPV and via livestreaming, while the 2022 editions of Stand & Deliver and In Your House only aired via livestreaming and not on PPV.

== Events ==
No.	Event	Date	Venue	Location	Main event	Ref.
1	TakeOver	May 29, 2014	Full Sail University	Winter Park, Florida	Adrian Neville (c) vs. Tyson Kidd for the NXT Championship	
2	Fatal 4-Way	September 11, 2014	Full Sail University	Winter Park, Florida	Adrian Neville (c) vs. Sami Zayn vs. Tyler Breeze vs. Tyson Kidd for the NXT Championship	
3	R Evolution	December 11, 2014	Full Sail University	Winter Park, Florida	Adrian Neville (c) vs. Sami Zayn in a Title vs. Career match for the NXT Championship	
4	Rival	February 11, 2015	Full Sail University	Winter Park, Florida	Sami Zayn (c) vs. Kevin Owens for the NXT Championship	
5	Unstoppable	May 20, 2015	Full Sail University	Winter Park, Florida	Kevin Owens (c) vs. Sami Zayn for the NXT Championship	
6	Brooklyn	August 22, 2015	Barclays Center	Brooklyn, New York	Finn Bálor (c) vs. Kevin Owens in a Ladder match for the NXT Championship	
7	Respect	October 7, 2015	Full Sail University	Winter Park, Florida	Bayley (c) vs. Sasha Banks in a 30-minute Iron Woman match for the NXT Women's Championship	
8	London	December 16, 2015	SSE Wembley Arena	London, England	Finn Bálor (c) vs. Samoa Joe for the NXT Championship	
9	Dallas	April 1, 2016	Kay Bailey Hutchison Convention Center	Dallas, Texas	Finn Bálor (c) vs. Samoa Joe for the NXT Championship	
10	The End	June 8, 2016	Full Sail University	Winter Park, Florida	Samoa Joe (c) vs. Finn Bálor in a Steel Cage match for the NXT Championship	
11	Brooklyn II	August 20, 2016	Barclays Center	Brooklyn, New York	Samoa Joe (c) vs. Shinsuke Nakamura for the NXT Championship	
12	Toronto	November 19, 2016	Air Canada Centre	Toronto, Ontario, Canada	Shinsuke Nakamura (c) vs. Samoa Joe for the NXT Championship	
13	San Antonio	January 28, 2017	Freeman Coliseum	San Antonio, Texas	Shinsuke Nakamura (c) vs. Bobby Roode for the NXT Championship	
14	Orlando	April 1, 2017	Amway Center	Orlando, Florida	Bobby Roode (c) vs. Shinsuke Nakamura for the NXT Championship	
15	Chicago	May 20, 2017	Allstate Arena	Rosemont, Illinois	The Authors of Pain (Akam and Rezar) (c) vs. DIY (Johnny Gargano and Tommaso Ciampa) in a Ladder match for the NXT Tag Team Championship	
16	Brooklyn III	August 19, 2017	Barclays Center	Brooklyn, New York	Bobby Roode (c) vs. Drew McIntyre for the NXT Championship	
17	WarGames	November 18, 2017	Toyota Center	Houston, Texas	SAnitY (Alexander Wolfe, Eric Young, and Killian Dain) vs. The Authors of Pain (Akam and Rezar) and Roderick Strong vs. The Undisputed Era (Adam Cole, Bobby Fish, and Kyle O'Reilly) in a WarGames match	
18	Philadelphia	January 27, 2018	Wells Fargo Center	Philadelphia, Pennsylvania	Andrade "Cien" Almas (c) vs. Johnny Gargano for the NXT Championship	
19	New Orleans	April 7, 2018	Smoothie King Center	New Orleans, Louisiana	Johnny Gargano vs. Tommaso Ciampa in an unsanctioned match	
20	Chicago II	June 16, 2018	Allstate Arena	Rosemont, Illinois	Johnny Gargano vs. Tommaso Ciampa in a Chicago Street Fight	
21	Brooklyn 4	August 18, 2018	Barclays Center	Brooklyn, New York	Tommaso Ciampa (c) vs. Johnny Gargano in a Last Man Standing match for the NXT Championship	
22	WarGames	November 17, 2018	Staples Center	Los Angeles, California	Pete Dunne, Ricochet, and War Raiders (Hanson and Rowe) vs. The Undisputed Era (Adam Cole, Bobby Fish, Kyle O'Reilly, and Roderick Strong) in a WarGames match	
23	Phoenix	January 26, 2019	Talking Stick Resort Arena	Phoenix, Arizona	Tommaso Ciampa (c) vs. Aleister Black for the NXT Championship	
24	New York	April 5, 2019	Barclays Center	Brooklyn, New York	Johnny Gargano vs. Adam Cole in a two-out-of-three falls match for the vacant NXT Championship	
25	XXV	June 1, 2019	Webster Bank Arena	Bridgeport, Connecticut	Johnny Gargano (c) vs. Adam Cole for the NXT Championship	
26	Toronto	August 10, 2019	Scotiabank Arena	Toronto, Ontario, Canada	Adam Cole (c) vs. Johnny Gargano in a two-out-of-three falls match for the NXT Championship	
27	WarGames	November 23, 2019	Allstate Arena	Rosemont, Illinois	Tommaso Ciampa, Keith Lee, Dominik Dijakovic, and Kevin Owens vs. The Undisputed Era (Adam Cole, Bobby Fish, Kyle O'Reilly, and Roderick Strong) in a WarGames match	
28	Portland	February 16, 2020	Moda Center	Portland, Oregon	Adam Cole (c) vs. Tommaso Ciampa for the NXT Championship	
29	In Your House	June 7, 2020	Full Sail University	Winter Park, Florida	Charlotte Flair (c) vs. Rhea Ripley vs. Io Shirai for the NXT Women's Championship	
30	XXX	August 22, 2020	Full Sail University	Winter Park, Florida	Keith Lee (c) vs. Karrion Kross for the NXT Championship	
31	31	October 4, 2020	Capitol Wrestling Center at WWE Performance Center	Orlando, Florida	Finn Bálor (c) vs. Kyle O'Reilly for the NXT Championship	
32	WarGames	December 6, 2020	Capitol Wrestling Center at WWE Performance Center	Orlando, Florida	The Undisputed Era (Adam Cole, Kyle O'Reilly, Roderick Strong, and Bobby Fish) vs. Team McAfee (Pat McAfee, Pete Dunne, Danny Burch, and Oney Lorcan) in a WarGames match	
33	Vengeance Day	February 14, 2021	Capitol Wrestling Center at WWE Performance Center	Orlando, Florida	Finn Bálor (c) vs. Pete Dunne for the NXT Championship	
34	Stand & Deliver	April 7, 2021	Capitol Wrestling Center at WWE Performance Center	Orlando, Florida	Io Shirai (c) vs. Raquel González for the NXT Women's Championship	
34	Stand & Deliver	April 8, 2021	Capitol Wrestling Center at WWE Performance Center	Orlando, Florida	Adam Cole vs. Kyle O'Reilly in an unsanctioned match	
35	In Your House	June 13, 2021	Capitol Wrestling Center at WWE Performance Center	Orlando, Florida	Karrion Kross (c) vs. Adam Cole vs. Kyle O'Reilly vs. Johnny Gargano vs. Pete Dunne for the NXT Championship	
36	36	August 22, 2021	Capitol Wrestling Center at WWE Performance Center	Orlando, Florida	Karrion Kross (c) vs. Samoa Joe for the NXT Championship	
(c) – refers to the champion(s) heading into the match

== See also ==
- List of WWE pay-per-view and livestreaming supercards
