= NXT TakeOver: Portland =

2020 WWE Network event

- Promotional poster featuring Johnny Gargano, Bianca Belair, Rhea Ripley, Adam Cole, Tommaso Ciampa, and Finn Bálor
- Promotion: WWE
- Brand: NXT
- Date: February 16, 2020
- City: Portland, Oregon
- Venue: Moda Center
- Attendance: 7,800

WWE event chronology
← Previous; Royal Rumble	Next → Super ShowDown

NXT TakeOver chronology
← Previous; WarGames	Next → In Your House

NXT TakeOver: Portland was a 2020 professional wrestling livestreaming event produced by WWE, held exclusively for wrestlers from the promotion's NXT brand division. It was the 28th NXT TakeOver event and took place on February 16, 2020, at the Moda Center in Portland, Oregon. The event aired exclusively on the WWE Network and was the first TakeOver to be held on a Sunday.

Six matches were contested at the event. In the main event, Adam Cole defeated Tommaso Ciampa to retain the NXT Championship. In the penultimate match, Dusty Rhodes Tag Team Classic winners The BroserWeights (Matt Riddle and Pete Dunne) defeated The Undisputed Era (Bobby Fish and Kyle O'Reilly) to win the NXT Tag Team Championship. In other prominent matches, Rhea Ripley retained the NXT Women's Championship against Bianca Belair, Keith Lee defeated Dominik Dijakovic to retain the NXT North American Championship, and in the opening bout, Finn Bálor defeated Johnny Gargano.

This was the last TakeOver event to take place before the start of the COVID-19 pandemic, which began affecting all of WWE's programming in mid-March with NXT's following episodes and events taking place in Florida as a result of the pandemic. It would subsequently be the final TakeOver to be held outside of Florida as the TakeOver series was discontinued in September 2021. It was also the final NXT event to take place outside of Florida until the brand's 2022 WrestleMania week event, Stand & Deliver. Additionally, this was the last standalone NXT livestreaming event to take place outside of Florida until the 2023 Vengeance Day.

== Production ==
=== Background ===
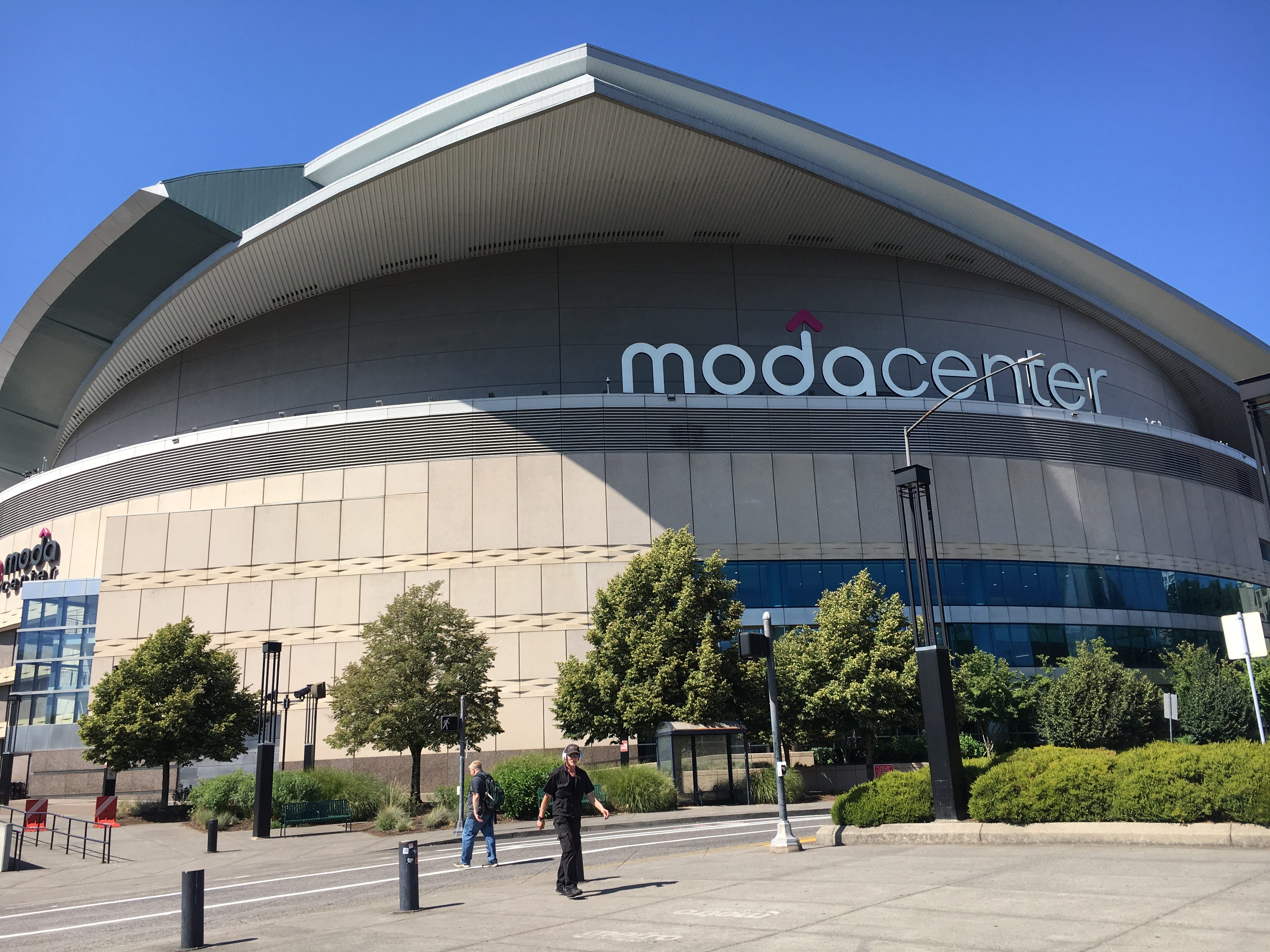
The 28th NXT TakeOver event was held at the Moda Center in Portland, Oregon.

TakeOver was a series of professional wrestling events that began in May 2014, as WWE's NXT brand held its second WWE Network-exclusive livestreaming event, billed as TakeOver. The "TakeOver" moniker subsequently became the branding for all of NXT's major events held periodically throughout the year. Announced during TakeOver: WarGames on November 23, 2019, TakeOver: Portland was scheduled as the 28th TakeOver event and the first to be held on a Sunday—all prior TakeOver events were held on Saturdays. The event took place on February 16, 2020, at the Moda Center and was named after the venue's city of Portland, Oregon. Tickets went on sale on December 20, 2019, through Ticketmaster.

=== Storylines ===
The card included matches that resulted from scripted storylines. Results were predetermined by WWE's writers on the NXT brand, while storylines were produced on WWE's weekly television program, NXT.

In March 2019, Tommaso Ciampa had to relinquish the NXT Championship due to having to undergo neck surgery that would put him out of action for at least six months. Adam Cole subsequently won the title at TakeOver: XXV that June. Ciampa then made his return on the October 2 episode of NXT, confronting Cole, and wanting a match for the title. At TakeOver: WarGames the following month, Team Ciampa defeated Cole's team, The Undisputed Era (Cole, Bobby Fish, Kyle O'Reilly, and Roderick Strong), in a WarGames match, with Ciampa pinning Cole. Over the coming weeks, Ciampa continued to set his sights on the NXT Championship, and a contract signing for the title match took place on the January 29, 2020, episode, where Ciampa fought off interference from The Undisputed Era, and sent Cole through the table, which he spray-painted. Ciampa then signed the contract, making the match official for TakeOver: Portland.

On the January 15 episode of NXT, Bianca Belair won a women's battle royal to earn an NXT Women's Championship match against Rhea Ripley at TakeOver: Portland.

On the October 2 episode of NXT, Finn Bálor made his return to NXT, confronting Adam Cole after the latter's title defense. Three weeks later, after the NXT North American Championship match, Bálor, Johnny Gargano, and Ciampa stared down The Undisputed Era (Adam Cole, Bobby Fish, Kyle O'Reilly, and NXT North American Champion Roderick Strong) when Bálor attacked Gargano, leading to The Undisputed Era attacking Ciampa. Afterwards, Bálor continued his attack on Gargano, performing a DDT onto the entrance ramp, putting him out of action. Gargano then returned on the December 18 episode, causing Bálor to lose his NXT Championship match. Three weeks later, Gargano addressed what Bálor was capable of when Bálor interrupted. Bálor told Gargano that if he wanted the moment, he would get it at TakeOver: Portland, if he could make it there. The match was made official the following week.

On the December 18, 2019, episode of NXT, it was announced that there would be a Dusty Rhodes Tag Team Classic. The tournament began on the January 8 episode of NXT. At Worlds Collide, it was revealed that the winner of the tournament would receive an NXT Tag Team Championship match at TakeOver: Portland. The final of the tournament took place on the January 29 episode of NXT, which saw The BroserWeights (Matt Riddle and Pete Dunne) defeat Grizzled Young Veterans (James Drake and Zack Gibson) to earn a match against The Undisputed Era (Bobby Fish and Kyle O'Reilly) for the title.

On the January 29 episode of NXT, Keith Lee, who won the NXT North American Championship the previous week, talked about his title win and elevating the title when Damian Priest and Dominik Dijakovic interrupted. They wanted their own shot at the title, and faced each other to determine the number one contender for the title that night, where Dijakovic won. The match was later scheduled for TakeOver: Portland.

During the women's WarGames match at TakeOver: WarGames, Dakota Kai attacked her teammate Tegan Nox as Kai was coming out of her cage, thus turning heel. As a result, Kai was dismissed while Nox was ruled unable to compete. On the January 15 episode of NXT, Kai eliminated Nox (who returned after a short hiatus due to a storyline injury) during the women's battle royal. Due to the animosity between Kai and Nox, the two faced each other in a match on January 29 episode of NXT, which Nox won after attacking Kai with her knee brace. On February 1, a street fight between Nox and Kai was made official for TakeOver: Portland.

== Event ==
Other on-screen personnel
Role:	Name:
Commentators	Mauro Ranallo
Commentators	Nigel McGuinness
Commentators	Beth Phoenix
Spanish commentators	Carlos Cabrera
Spanish commentators	Jerry Soto
Ring announcer	Alicia Taylor
Referees	Drake Wuertz
Referees	Darryl Sharma
Referees	D.A. Brewer
Interviewer	Cathy Kelley
Pre-show panel	Charly Caruso
Pre-show panel	Sam Roberts
Pre-show panel	Mansoor

=== Preliminary matches ===
The event began with Keith Lee defending the NXT North American Championship against Dominik Dijakovic. The match began hot when Lee performed a Hurricanrana on Dijakovic to a massive ovation. The match became a hard-hitting affair from then on. Lee would later perform three Grizzly Magnums to Dijakovic on the outside that were heard all across the arena. Dijakovic would bounce back by performing a Superkick and a Springboard Swanton Bomb on Lee on the outside. After trading some near-finishers, Lee would perform a Spirit Bomb, only for Dijakovic to land on his feet. Lee would then perform another Spirit Bomb for a close nearfall. Dijakovic would go on to perform a massive Super Spanish Fly for a nearfall. Dijakovic would try to go for Feast Your Eyes, but his back gave out, allowing Lee to perform a Big Bang Catastrophe on Dijakovic to retain the title. After the match, the two showed their respect for each other.

In the second match, Tegan Nox took on Dakota Kai in a street fight. The two had used different weapons all throughout the match like chairs, trash cans, a laptop, and a cricket bat. In the end, Nox had given Kai a Shiniest Wizard, but she was not done yet. Nox had Kai propped up on a table with a chair wrapped around Kai's neck. Suddenly, Raquel González, in her first appearance in WWE since the Mae Young Classic in 2018, appeared, and slammed Nox through the table, allowing Kai to pin Nox for the win.

After that, Johnny Gargano faced Finn Bálor. During the match, Gargano attacked Balor and landed a Slingshot Spear for a nearfall. Meanwhile, Gargano attempted a Slingshot DDT, then Balor got away and landed a knee. In the end, after Gargano performed a Shotgun Dropkick to Balor into the barricade, Balor recuperated and gave Gargano a Shotgun Dropkick of his own. Balor then followed this up with a Coup de Grâce and a 1916 for the victory.

In the fourth match, Rhea Ripley defended the NXT Women's Championship against Bianca Belair. In the end, Ripley performed Riptide on Belair to retain. Suddenly, Charlotte Flair, the 2020 Women's Royal Rumble match winner, attacked Ripley and Belair, accepting Ripley's challenge for an NXT Women's Championship match at WrestleMania 36.

In the penultimate match, The Undisputed Era (Bobby Fish and Kyle O'Reilly) defended the NXT Tag Team Championship against the Dusty Rhodes Tag Team Classic winners The BroserWeights (Matt Riddle and Pete Dunne). This match was filled with many high-risk spots and physical double-team action. Near the end, Riddle ran in and accidentally gave Dunne a Spear. O'Reilly and Fish then capitalized by performing Chasing the Dragon on Dunne for a dramatic nearfall. Dunne fought out of High Low and tagged Riddle in. Riddle tossed O'Reilly into Dunne's Enzuigiri to give Riddle and Dunne the victory and the titles.

=== Main event ===
The main event was the long-anticipated NXT Championship match between champion Adam Cole and challenger Tommaso Ciampa. Not long into the match, Cole performed a Wheelbarrow Suplex on Ciampa to the broadcast table neck-first. Eventually, Ciampa countered an elevated Panama Sunrise and performed a top-rope Air Raid Crash on Cole for a nearfall. Ciampa then gave Cole two Powerbombs onto the Spanish announce table. Following a Superkick by Cole and a massive Lariat by Ciampa, Ciampa performed a Project Ciampa on Cole for another nearfall. Cole later went for a Suicide Dive, but Ciampa caught him with a Rocket Launcher Toss. Cole then performed a Draping Piledriver and a Kneecap Brainbuster for a nearfall. Cole then performed a Last Shot, but Ciampa rolled out before he could make the cover. Ciampa then gave Cole another Air Raid Crash onto the ring apron, but Cole followed up with the Panama Sunrise onto the floor. As Cole was getting back into the ring, Ciampa surprised him with a Willow's Bell and then performed the Fairytale Ending for a jaw-dropping nearfall. Soon after, the rest of the Undisputed Era interfered, but Ciampa took out every member with a Slingshot Corkscrew Plancha and fought them off. Cole, however, delivered three Superkicks and a second Last Shot for a dramatic nearfall. Cole then shoved Ciampa into the referee and performed a low blow on Ciampa, but Ciampa bounced back with a low blow of his own and performed a Fairytale Ending, but there was no referee to count the pinfall. Suddenly, Johnny Gargano came back and told Ciampa to use the NXT Championship as a weapon, only for Gargano to pull it away. After a few seconds, Gargano swung around and struck Ciampa in the head with the title, turning heel to the shock of everyone in the audience. Cole then covered the unconscious Ciampa to win the match and retain the title.

== Reception ==
TakeOver: Portland received critical acclaim from both fans and critics, with many deeming this one of the best TakeOvers WWE had produced.

Erik Beaston of Bleacher Report gave praise to all of the matches on the card, saying that the NXT North American Championship match was "a heavyweight war of attrition between two guys familiar with each other", the Bálor-Gargano match had awesome storytelling, making that match a true "Match of the Year contender" and that Bálor "needed the win here to advance to the next level of the competition", and as for Gargano, he "loses nothing in defeat, as we have witnessed many times over the course of his career". He ranked that match as the highest-graded match at the event with a grade of A+. Beaston said that Gargano's betrayal on Ciampa during the NXT Championship match was not shocking, and that "the relationship between the team formerly known as DIY has been one of twists, turns, and a roller coaster of emotion", and that "one has to hope that Triple H and those in charge of crafting the story understand how important it is for them to put an exclamation point on this epic rivalry with one last great match", and "how vital an injection of freshness will be to ensuring fans can muster enough emotion and energy to watch the familiar foes battle one more time".

Adam Silverstein of CBS Sports also gave praise to all of the matches at the event. He said that the NXT North American Championship was "the best big-man match I've ever seen", and ranked that match as the highest-graded match at the event with a grade of A+, the Bálor-Gargano match was a "fantastic battle", though "a bit slow in the early going to get a top-tier mark", and that Gargano's turn during the NXT Championship match "was difficult for most fans to see due to its positioning, and the abrupt finish put a sour note on an otherwise outstanding match that did not need the swerve for Cole to come out on top".

Kelly Wells of Pro Wrestling Torch called the match between Dominik Dijakovic and Keith Lee "the best of their many televised matches", and called them "an absolute dream pairing". He stated that the match between Johnny Gargano and Finn Bálor was "an honest wrestling match", and "while the early part of the match served as a comedown from the previous chaos, it worked itself back into an important match with some high spots and strong ring physicality". Wells stated that the NXT Championship match was "as much of an overbooked, Attitude Era-style main event that they've ever done", while stating that the climax of the match caused "an explanation from Johnny Gargano" to be the hook for the following episode of NXT, and that "we're likely to see more Ciampa-Gargano, and possibly a triple threat on WrestleMania weekend". He concluded that the heel turn "should provide some intrigue on a brand that spends too much time being predictable", while stating that "this was an extremely strong wrestling show, with all matches getting a decent amount of time, and there were more angles by far than usual".

The highest rated matches on the card, according to Dave Meltzer, were the NXT Tag Team Championship match and the NXT Championship match, which both received 4.75 stars. The Finn Bálor vs. Johnny Gargano match received 4.5 stars, the NXT North American Championship match received 4.25 stars, the NXT Women's Championship match received 3.5 stars, and the street fight was the lowest rated match at the event, receiving 3 stars.

== Aftermath ==
On the following episode of NXT, Raquel González and Dakota Kai talked about their new alliance, only for NXT General Manager William Regal to inform them that González would take on Tegan Nox in a Steel Cage match on the March 4 episode, where Kai again won after interference from González. The following week, Nox qualified for the ladder match to determine the new number one contender for the NXT Women's Championship, while Kai was unable to after an untimely distraction by González. However, on the April 1 episode, Kai won a last chance gauntlet match to qualify for the final spot in the ladder match.

Also on NXT, The BroserWeights (Matt Riddle and Pete Dunne) celebrated their NXT Tag Team Championship win, only to be interrupted by Danny Burch and Oney Lorcan, leading to a match between the two teams, where Riddle and Dunne were victorious. The following week, The Undisputed Era (Bobby Fish and Kyle O'Reilly) wanted another shot at the NXT Tag Team Championship. On the March 4 episode, after they defeated Burch and Lorcan, Fish and O'Reilly were confronted by Riddle and Dunne, but were also confronted by The Grizzled Young Veterans (James Drake and Zack Gibson). The NXT Tag Team Championship match was scheduled for the following week, where Riddle and Dunne retained despite interference from Drake and Gibson. This turned out to be Riddle and Dunne's final time teaming together, as Dunne became inactive due to being unable to travel back to the U.S. during the COVID-19 pandemic. Also, The Grizzled Young Veterans became inactive due to travel issues from that pandemic.

Keith Lee talked about retaining the NXT North American Championship at TakeOver: Portland, but was interrupted by Kona Reeves, leading to a match between the two, where Lee won in 13 seconds. Afterwards, Dominik Dijakovic confronted Lee, wanting another match for the title, which Lee accepted. The following week, however, Dijakovic lost to Cameron Grimes after interference from Damian Priest. On the March 4 episode, Lee talked about his challengers for the title when Grimes interrupted, setting up a title match between Grimes and Lee for the following week, where Lee retained. Afterwards, Priest attacked Lee with a nightstick, but was sent retreating by Dijakovic, only for Lee to leave Dijakovic laying. On the March 25 episode, Priest and Dijakovic challenged Lee for the title, and the match was scheduled for the April 1 episode, where Lee retained by pinning Dijakovic.

Tommaso Ciampa attacked Austin Theory before the latter's match to send a message to Johnny Gargano. A match between Ciampa and Theory took place the following week, where Ciampa won. Afterwards, Gargano attacked Ciampa, and stood tall with the assistance from Theory. On the March 4 episode, Gargano appeared from the WWE Performance Center and told Ciampa that he would see him there the following week, when NXT went to that arena for the following week's episode. There, Ciampa addressed Gargano from the ring, but Gargano appeared on the TitanTron in a conference room in the Performance Center. Gargano talked about not forgetting what Ciampa did to the fans and himself, and about Ciampa being the worst person in history when Ciampa headed out of the ring and towards Gargano. The two then brawled all throughout the arena, with Ciampa standing tall in the end after performing an Air Raid Crash from an elevated platform on Gargano through the announce table. On the March 25 episode, Triple H announced one final match between the two for the April 8 episode, where Gargano was ultimately victorious after interference from his wife, Candice LeRae, to end the rivalry.

Due to the COVID-19 pandemic, WWE moved many of their upcoming shows for Raw and SmackDown, including WrestleMania 36, to the WWE Performance Center in Orlando, Florida with no fans in attendance. NXT's events were exclusively held at their home base of Full Sail University in Winter Park, Florida. This change began with the March 13 episodes of SmackDown and 205 Live. The WWE Hall of Fame Ceremony was also postponed. NXT's next event, TakeOver: Tampa Bay, had also been postponed, but was eventually canceled; matches scheduled and planned for the event were moved to episodes of NXT, beginning April 1. From March 21–26, WWE pre-taped several episodes of their weekly programs for future broadcasts, including WrestleMania 36 (which was taped on March 25 and 26 and then airing on April 4 and 5).

In August, Raw and SmackDown's shows were moved to a bio-secure bubble called the WWE ThunderDome, while in October, NXT's events were moved to the Performance Center, where its main arena was reconfigured as the Capitol Wrestling Center, which was similar to the ThunderDome. In July 2021, WWE resumed live touring for Raw and SmackDown, but NXT remained at the Performance Center, although with COVID restrictions lifted and full crowds in attendance. This also ended up being the last TakeOver event held outside of Florida, as in September 2021, the "Capitol Wrestling Center" name was phased out, with future events just being billed as held from the Performance Center. Later that year, the TakeOver series was discontinued. NXT's WrestleMania week event, Stand & Deliver in 2022, would be NXT's first major event held outside of Florida since TakeOver: Portland, while the 2023 Vengeance Day would be the brand's first standalone livestreaming event held outside of Florida since TakeOver: Portland.

== Results ==
No.	Results	Stipulations	Times
1	Keith Lee (c) defeated Dominik Dijakovic by pinfall	Singles match for the NXT North American Championship	20:20
2	Dakota Kai defeated Tegan Nox by pinfall	Street Fight	14:24
3	Finn Bálor defeated Johnny Gargano by pinfall	Singles match	29:22
4	Rhea Ripley (c) defeated Bianca Belair by pinfall	Singles match for the NXT Women's Championship	17:30
5	The BroserWeights (Matt Riddle and Pete Dunne) defeated The Undisputed Era (Bobby Fish and Kyle O'Reilly) (c) by pinfall	Tag team match for the NXT Tag Team Championship	24:53
6	Adam Cole (c) defeated Tommaso Ciampa by pinfall	Singles match for the NXT Championship	36:24
(c) / – the champion(s) heading into the match

=== Dusty Rhodes Tag Team Classic bracket ===
The fifth edition of the Dusty Rhodes Tag Team Classic began on the January 8, 2020, episode of NXT and culminated on the January 29 episode. This single-elimination tournament consisted of eight tag teams, equally split between NXT and NXT UK. In the first round, each match featured a tag team from NXT facing against a tag team from NXT UK. In the tournament final, NXT's The BroserWeights (Matt Riddle and Pete Dunne) defeated NXT UK's Grizzled Young Veterans (James Drake and Zack Gibson).

2020 Dusty Rhodes Tag Team Classic bracket

First round NXT; January 8–15, 2020
NXT UK	Imperium (Fabian Aichner and Marcel Barthel)	Pinfall
NXT	The Forgotten Sons (Steve Cutler and Wesley Blake)	5:08
NXT	The BroserWeights (Matt Riddle and Pete Dunne)	Pinfall
NXT UK	Mark Andrews and Flash Morgan Webster	18:20
NXT UK	Grizzled Young Veterans (James Drake and Zack Gibson)	Pinfall
NXT	Time Splitters (Kushida and Alex Shelley)	12:00
NXT UK	Gallus (Mark Coffey and Wolfgang)	8:51
NXT	The Undisputed Era (Bobby Fish and Kyle O'Reilly)	Pinfall

Semifinals; NXT; January 22, 2020
NXT UK	Imperium	11:23
NXT	The BroserWeights	Pinfall
NXT UK	Grizzled Young Veterans	Pinfall
NXT	The Undisputed Era	13:00

Final; NXT; January 29, 2020
NXT	The BroserWeights	Pinfall
NXT UK	Grizzled Young Veterans	17:39
