= NXT TakeOver: In Your House (2020) =

WWE Network event

- Promotional poster featuring Adam Cole and Velveteen Dream
- Promotion: WWE
- Brand: NXT
- Date: June 7, 2020
- City: Winter Park, Florida
- Venue: Full Sail University
- Attendance: 0 (behind closed doors) (Note: The event was held without a paying audience due to the COVID-19 pandemic in the United States, though a few WWE wrestlers and trainees appeared in the crowd.)

WWE event chronology
← Previous; Money in the Bank	Next → Backlash

NXT TakeOver chronology
← Previous; Portland	Next → XXX

In Your House chronology
← Previous; St. Valentine's Day Massacre	Next → NXT TakeOver (2021)

The 2020 NXT TakeOver: In Your House was a professional wrestling livestreaming event produced by WWE, held for wrestlers from the promotion's NXT brand division. It was simultaneously the 29th NXT TakeOver event, NXT's inaugural In Your House, and WWE's 28th In Your House overall. The event was streamed exclusively on the WWE Network on June 7, 2020. While the majority of the event aired live from NXT's home venue at the time, Full Sail University in Winter Park, Florida, the Backlot Brawl match was pre-recorded on May 28 in the parking lot of Full Sail.

The event marked the 25th anniversary of the first In Your House pay-per-view (PPV) event, which was held in May 1995. It was also the first In Your House branded event since St. Valentine's Day Massacre: In Your House in February 1999, which made it the first In Your House to air on the WWE Network, as well as the first and only to not broadcast on traditional PPV. This was also the first TakeOver event to be held at Full Sail University since TakeOver: The End in June 2016. That event had been promoted as the final TakeOver to be held at Full Sail; however, the COVID-19 pandemic necessitated all of NXT's events to be held here behind closed doors until NXT's events were relocated to the WWE Performance Center in Orlando in October, which became the brand's permanent home venue. As a result, it was the first TakeOver to be held during the pandemic. This also marked the first event in an annual series of In Your House shows for NXT held in June.

Six matches were contested at the event. In the main event, Io Shirai defeated defending champion Charlotte Flair and Rhea Ripley in a triple threat match to win the NXT Women's Championship. On the undercard, Karrion Kross defeated Tommaso Ciampa by technical submission, Keith Lee defeated Johnny Gargano to retain the NXT North American Championship, and Adam Cole defeated Velveteen Dream in a Last Chance Backlot Brawl to retain the NXT Championship, which was produced as a cinematic match.

== Production ==
=== Background ===
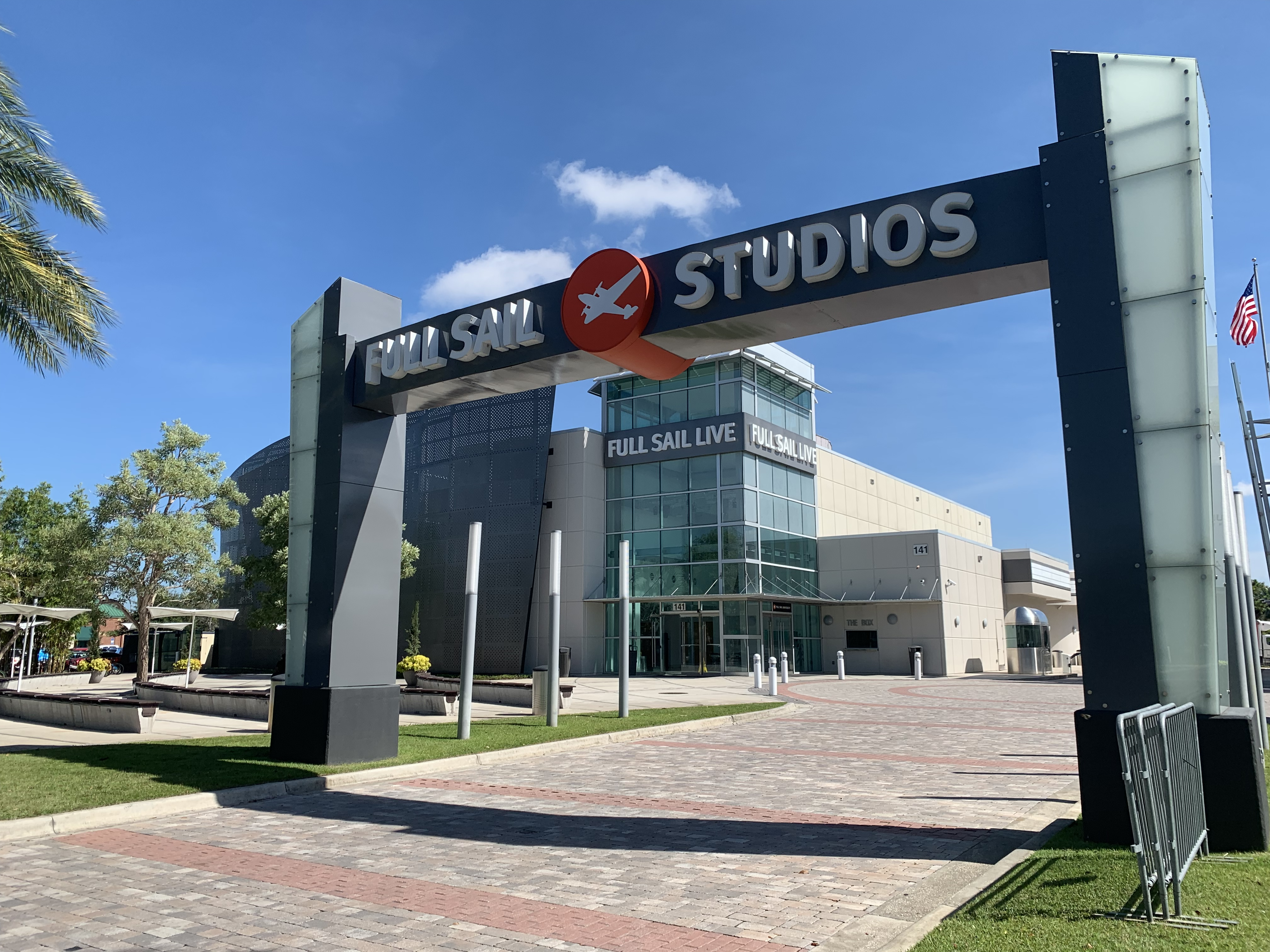
The 29th NXT TakeOver event, which was NXT's inaugural In Your House and 29th In Your House overall, was the first TakeOver held at NXT's home venue at the time, Full Sail University in Winter Park, Florida, since TakeOver: The End in June 2016 due to the COVID-19 pandemic.

TakeOver was a series of professional wrestling events that began in May 2014, as WWE's NXT brand held its second WWE Network-exclusive livestreaming event, billed as TakeOver. The "TakeOver" moniker subsequently became the branding for all of NXT's major events held periodically throughout the year. On May 13, 2020, for the 25th anniversary of the first In Your House pay-per-view (PPV) event, WWE announced that it had revived the In Your House name for the 29th TakeOver event to be held on June 7, 2020.

In Your House was a series of monthly PPV events that were held by WWE from May 1995 to February 1999. They aired when the promotion was not holding one of its then-five major PPVs at the time (WrestleMania, King of the Ring, SummerSlam, Survivor Series, and Royal Rumble), and were sold at a lower cost. The branding was retired following February 1999's St. Valentine's Day Massacre: In Your House, as the company moved to install permanent names for each of its monthly PPVs. TakeOver: In Your House marked the first In Your House-branded event in 21 years and subsequently the 28th In Your House event. It was in turn the first In Your House to air on the WWE Network and the first to not air on traditional PPV.

==== Impact of the COVID-19 pandemic ====
As a result of the COVID-19 pandemic that began affecting the industry in mid-March, WWE had to present the majority of its programming from a behind closed doors set. Broadcasts of NXT were subsequently held at NXT's home venue at the time, Full Sail University in Winter Park, Florida. The pandemic also forced the cancelation of the previously scheduled TakeOver event, TakeOver: Tampa Bay. In Your House was subsequently scheduled to be held at Full Sail University, marking the first TakeOver event to take place during the pandemic, as well as the first TakeOver event to be hosted at Full Sail since TakeOver: The End in June 2016. That event had been promoted as the final TakeOver at Full Sail, but the pandemic necessitated the move to the venue. While the majority of the event aired live on June 7, 2020, the Backlot Brawl match was pre-recorded on May 28 as a cinematic match.

=== Storylines ===
The event comprised six matches that resulted from scripted storylines. Results were predetermined by WWE's writers on the NXT brand, while storylines were produced on WWE's weekly television program, NXT.

On the April 15 episode of NXT, after Tommaso Ciampa admitted that Johnny Gargano was the better man following their One Final Beat match the previous week, he was attacked backstage by the debuting Karrion Kross. After Kross's match on the May 20 episode, Ciampa challenged Kross to a match at TakeOver: In Your House.

During WrestleMania 36 Part 2, Charlotte Flair defeated Rhea Ripley by submission to win the NXT Women's Championship. On the following episode of NXT, Io Shirai won a six-woman ladder match to earn a championship match against Flair, which Shirai won by disqualification on the May 6 episode after which, Ripley returned and saved Shirai. On the May 20 episode, the match between Shirai and Ripley ended in a no-contest when Flair attacked both. A triple threat match between the three women was then scheduled for TakeOver: In Your House.

On the April 22 episode of NXT, Finn Bálor was scheduled for a match with Velveteen Dream, but Bálor was knocked out by an unknown attacker before he could leave his dressing room. Two weeks later, Bálor concluded that there was a "snake hiding in the long grass back there" and that whoever attacked him wanted a push. Bálor assured the audience that it would not be a push, but rather a squash. After Cameron Grimes won his match later that night, he was confronted by Bálor, setting up a match between the two for the May 13 episode, where Grimes won after Damian Priest attacked Bálor with a nightstick. Priest then revealed that he was the one who knocked out Bálor on the April 22 episode, turning Bálor face. On the May 20 episode, Priest stated that he would be coming for Bálor at TakeOver: In Your House, and on May 26, the match was made official.

== Event ==
Other on-screen personnel
Role:	Name:
Commentators	Mauro Ranallo
Commentators	Beth Phoenix
Commentators	Tom Phillips
Spanish commentators	Carlos Cabrera
Spanish commentators	Marcelo Rodriguez
Ring announcer	Alicia Taylor
Referees	Drake Wuertz
Referees	Darryl Sharma
Referees	Danilo Anfibio
Referees	D.A. Brewer
Referees	Tom Castor
Pre-show panel	Scott Stanford
Pre-show panel	Sam Roberts
Pre-show panel	Pat McAfee

=== Preliminary matches ===
The event opened with Mia Yim, Tegan Nox, and Shotzi Blackheart facing the team of Candice LeRae, Dakota Kai, and Raquel González. In the climax, Nox performed the Shiniest Wizard on both Gonzalez and Kai, followed by Nox pinning Kai to win the match.

Next, Finn Bálor faced Damian Priest. During Bálor's entrance, Priest threw Bálor out of the ring. In the climax, Bálor knocked Priest, who was poised atop a turnbuckle, onto the steel steps. As Priest came back in the ring, Bálor performed two Coup de Grâces on Priest to win the match.

After that, Keith Lee defended the NXT North American Championship against Johnny Gargano. Late in the match, Gargano's wife Candice LeRae emerged to distract Lee; however, Mia Yim came out and brawled with LeRae. This distracted the referee and Gargano took advantage of the situation and gouged Lee's eyes with a key. Gargano performed One Final Beat and a superkick on Lee for a near-fall. In the closing moments, Lee performed a Spirit Bomb and a Big Bang Catastrophe on Gargano to retain the title.

Next was the Last Chance Backlot Brawl in which Adam Cole defended the NXT Championship against Velveteen Dream. The match occurred in the parking lot of Full Sail University with a wrestling ring set up surrounded by cars; the match could only be won by a pinfall or submission in the ring. Dream got three roll-ups to start the match, but then Cole came back with a boot to the face followed by punches. Stating that Dream did not deserve the title, Cole got in a car and attempted to leave, but Dream went after him with a baseball bat and smashed in a window. Later, Dream slammed Cole onto the hood of a car. Dream brought a ladder around the ringside area. Dream set up the ladder by the hood of the car that Cole was lying on. As Dream climbed the ladder, another car drove up and began honking. Cole's Undisputed Era teammates Roderick Strong and Bobby Fish then emerged from the car. Cole also ascended the ladder but was knocked off by Dream and landed onto the windshield, causing Cole's right arm to bleed. Strong and Fish then attacked Dream. Strong and Fish then threw several chairs into the ring. Dexter Lumis would then show up from under the ring and beat up Strong and Fish with a steel chair and threw Strong and Fish in the trunk of a car and drove off. In the ring, Cole attempted a Panama Sunrise, but Dream caught him and hit the Dream Valley Driver for a two count. Dream then hit a diving elbow from the top rope for another nearfall. Cole then hit a low blow on Dream and followed with a Panama Sunrise onto the steel chairs to win and retain the title. Due to the stipulation of the match, Dream could no longer challenge for the NXT Championship as long as Cole was champion.

In the penultimate match, Tommaso Ciampa faced Karrion Kross, who was accompanied to the ring by Scarlett. Ciampa struck with hard strikes to the head, Kross sold it a bit and Kross hit a full extension kick to the head. Kross delivered an overhead suplex across the ring. Ciampa struck with another hard kick, then a clothesline over the top to the floor and Kross followed him out of the ring. Kross picked up Ciampa and sent him back first into the edge of the ring apron. Back in the ring, Kross delivered another belly-to-belly suplex across the ring. Kross continued the attack with another belly-to-belly suplex across the ring as he smiled at the violence he was causing. Kross delivered repeated knees to the face against the turnbuckle. Kross dared Ciampa to hit him, then Kross hit a Northern Lights Suplex into a clothesline. Ciampa responded with hard chops and strikes to the face, then a kick that sent Kross out of the ring. Kross was on the apron and Ciampa hit Widow's Bell for a two count. Ciampa struck with a running knee to the face, then another running knee to the face, but Kross blocked a move from Ciampa. Kross would put Ciampa on his shoulders and hit a Doomsday Saito. Kross would then apply the Kross Jacket. Ciampa passed out, giving the win to Kross by technical submission.

=== Main event ===
In the main event, Charlotte Flair defended the NXT Women's Championship against Io Shirai and Rhea Ripley in a triple threat match. In the climax, Flair performed a Spear on Ripley and then applied the Figure Eight submission on her. During this, Shirai performed a moonsault on Ripley from the top rope and pinned Ripley to win the title while Flair was tied up with the submission. The show ended with Shirai embracing with her newly won title belt as streamers and confetti filled the arena.

== Aftermath ==
The 2020 TakeOver: In Your House would be the first in a subseries of TakeOvers titled TakeOver: In Your House. The second event was also held in June. The TakeOver series was discontinued in late 2021, but one further In Your House for NXT was held in June 2022.

== Results ==
No.	Results	Stipulations	Times
1	Mia Yim, Shotzi Blackheart, and Tegan Nox defeated Candice LeRae, Dakota Kai, and Raquel González by pinfall	Six-woman tag team match	9:50
2	Finn Bálor defeated Damian Priest by pinfall	Singles match	13:07
3	Keith Lee (c) defeated Johnny Gargano by pinfall	Singles match for the NXT North American Championship	20:35
4	Adam Cole (c) defeated Velveteen Dream by pinfall	Last Chance Backlot Brawl for the NXT Championship	14:57
5	Karrion Kross (with Scarlett) defeated Tommaso Ciampa by technical submission	Singles match	6:13
6	Io Shirai defeated Charlotte Flair (c) and Rhea Ripley by pinfall	Triple threat match for the NXT Women's Championship	17:36
(c) / – the champion(s) heading into the match
