= NXT TakeOver: Tampa Bay =

Cancelled WWE Network event

- Promotion: WWE
- Brand: NXT
- Date: April 4, 2020 (canceled)
- City: Tampa, Florida
- Venue: Amalie Arena

WWE event chronology
← Previous; Elimination Chamber	Next → WrestleMania 36

NXT TakeOver chronology
← Previous; Portland	Next → In Your House

NXT TakeOver: Tampa Bay was a scheduled professional wrestling livestreaming event that was to be produced by WWE. It would have been the 29th NXT TakeOver event held exclusively for wrestlers from the promotion's NXT brand division—TakeOver: In Your House in June subsequently became the 29th. The event was originally scheduled to take place on April 4, 2020, from the Amalie Arena in Tampa, Florida, but had been postponed due to the COVID-19 pandemic. The event was ultimately canceled, but matches scheduled and planned for the event were rescheduled to take place across multiple episodes of NXT, starting April 1. Tampa later received the NXT livestreaming event, Battleground, in 2025 at nearby Yuengling Center.

== Production ==
=== Background ===
TakeOver was a series of professional wrestling events that began in May 2014, as WWE's NXT brand held its second WWE Network-exclusive livestreaming event, billed as TakeOver. The "TakeOver" moniker subsequently became the branding for all of NXT's major events held periodically throughout the year. Announced on December 9, 2019, the 29th TakeOver event was originally scheduled as TakeOver: Tampa Bay (In Your House in June instead became the 29th). It was titled Tampa Bay as it was to be held in the Tampa Bay area in Florida and it was scheduled to be a support show for WrestleMania 36.

The event was scheduled to take place on April 4, 2020, from the Amalie Arena in Tampa, Florida, however, like WWE's other WrestleMania week events, TakeOver: Tampa Bay was postponed due to the COVID-19 pandemic. On March 24, however, it was announced that TakeOver: Tampa Bay had been canceled, but matches scheduled and planned for the event were rescheduled to take place across multiple episodes of NXT beginning April 1. Tampa would be compensated with another NXT livestreaming event, later held as Battleground on May 25, 2025, at nearby Yuengling Center.

=== Storylines ===
The card would have included matches that resulted from scripted storylines, with results predetermined by WWE's writers on the NXT brand and storylines produced on the weekly NXT television program.

Prior to the event's cancellation, only one match had been confirmed for TakeOver: Tampa Bay. On the February 26 episode of NXT, General Manager William Regal announced that there would be a ladder match at the event to determine the number one contender for the NXT Women's Championship. In addition, he revealed that the participants for the ladder match would be determined through a series of qualifying matches held over several weeks. Chelsea Green, Mia Yim, and Tegan Nox qualified for the match by defeating Shotzi Blackheart, Dakota Kai, and Deonna Purrazzo, respectively. Following the announcement of the event's cancellation, the remaining ladder match participants continued to qualify on NXT.

== Announced matches at the time of cancellation ==
No.	Matches*	Stipulations
1	Chelsea Green vs. Mia Yim vs. Tegan Nox vs. TBD	Ladder match to determine the number one contender for the NXT Women's Championship
*Card subject to change
