= Pete Dunne =

English professional wrestler (born 1993)

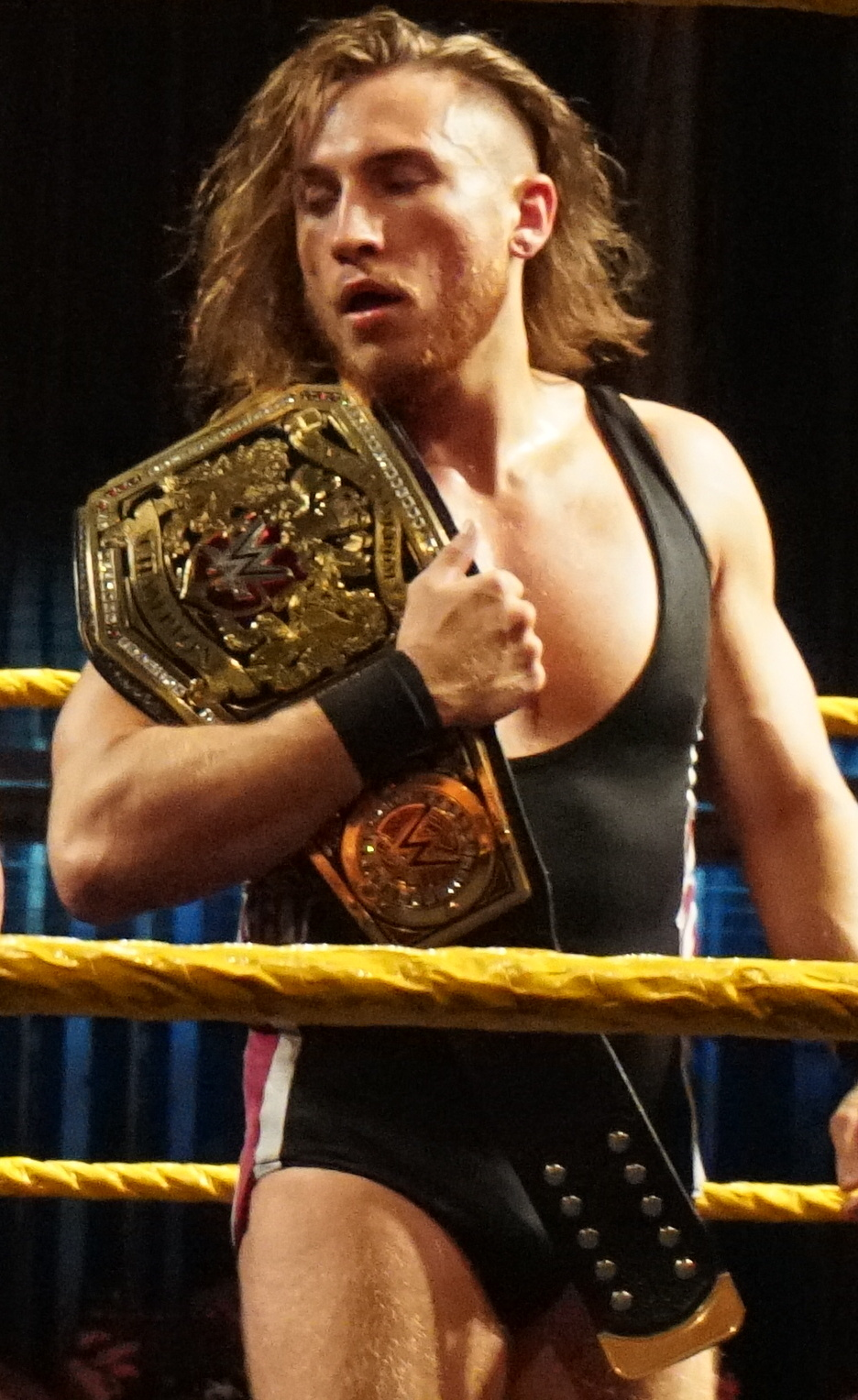
- Dunne as the WWE United Kingdom Champion in 2018

Personal information
- Born: Peter Thomas England; 9 November 1993 (age 32) Solihull, West Midlands, England

Professional wrestling career
- Ring name(s): Butch; Pete Dunne; Pete England; Rayo Americano; Streetfighter Ken; Tiger Kid
- Billed height: 5 ft 10 in (1.78 m)
- Billed weight: 205 lb (93 kg)
- Billed from: Birmingham, England
- Trained by: Steven Edwards
- Debut: 2007

Peter Thomas England (born 9 November 1993), better known by his ring name Pete Dunne, is an English professional wrestler, trainer and producer. As of January 2026, he is signed to WWE, where he performs on the Raw brand as Rayo Americano (/ˈraɪ.oʊ/) as a member of the Los Americanos stable. He also works as a producer for WWE's sister promotion Lucha Libre AAA Worldwide (AAA).

England began training in 2006, at the age of 12, and had his debut match in 2007. He has since worked extensively across the global independent circuit in promotions such as Destiny World Wrestling (DWW), Fight Club: Pro (FCP), Insane Championship Wrestling (ICW), Michinoku Pro Wrestling (MPW), Over the Top Wrestling, Pro Wrestling Guerrilla (PWG), Progress Wrestling (where he is a former Progress World Champion), Revolution Pro Wrestling (RPW), Singapore Pro Wrestling (SPW), and Westside Xtreme Wrestling (wXw).

He signed with WWE, being assigned to the develomental brands NXT UK and NXT, where he became the WWE United Kingdom Champion, NXT Tag Team Champion alongside Matt Riddle and they also won the 2020 Dusty Rhodes Tag Team Classic. When he was called up to the main roster, he worked from 2022 to 2024 as Butch, a member of the Brawling Brutes stable. England reverted to his Pete Dunne gimmick in January 2024 and began teaming with Tyler Bate as New Catch Republic. In 2025, they were repackaged as Los Americanos, working as Rayo Americano (Dunne) and Bravo Americano (Bate).

== Early life ==
Peter Thomas England was born in Solihull on 9 November 1993 and was raised in Chelmsley Wood.

== Professional wrestling career ==
=== Training and early career (2006–2011) ===
England began training in 2006, at the age of 12, originally under the tutelage of Steve "Psycho" Edwards at Phoenix Wrestling in Coventry. He has said that his early training under Edwards was limited and provided him with only "the basics". Dunne's first appearance as a wrestler was at the 2007 Holbrooks Festival in Coventry, where he first met and wrestled Mark Andrews. He later trained for a short time under Max Angelus and began working on other small local shows, largely in community centres around his native Birmingham. He competed under a mask as Tiger Kid until January 2010, when he lost a hair vs mask match to Helix at Riot Act Wrestling in Kent. He then retired the character and mask, adopted the Pete Dunne name, and began regularly performing in a tag team alongside his kayfabe brother Damian Dunne. He spent most of his early career working for as many small independent promotions as possible such as EDW Wrestling in Shrewsbury, and Kamikaze Pro Wrestling in Birmingham, as well as regularly practicing with Mark Andrews and other friends, training in a re-purposed boxing ring in a community centre in Cardiff during the school holidays. Dunne began competing internationally and more regularly in 2011, competing for LDN Wrestling in England; Dublin Championship Wrestling in Ireland; Celtic Wrestling, Welsh Wrestling, Royal Imperial Wrestling in Wales, and PBW in Scotland.

=== Attack! Pro Wrestling (2011–2016, 2017–2018) ===
In a move to increase the number opportunities available to their group of friends, Dunne and ring announcer Jim Lee co-founded Attack! Pro Wrestling in 2011, arranging a weekend of shows in Birmingham. On the first weekend of shows in August 2011, Dunne wrestled in a four-man tournament dubbed the Elder Stein Invitational, in which he advanced to the final before losing to Mark Andrews. The promotion would later expand to run shows primarily in Cardiff and Bristol, with Dunne an ever-present performer, primarily as a face, and often taking on his best friend Mark. Sometime in 2014, Dunne would be one of the focuses of BBC 3 television show "People Like Us", a show revolving around following people from the Birmingham Borough of Chelmsley Wood and its surrounding areas as they make strides to achieve their personal goals, such as weight loss, acting careers or in Dunne's case, becoming a pro wrestler. Dunne would later become one of the promotion's primary heels after unexpectedly turning on Mark at "Mandrews Goes To America" in January 2015, a show themed as a farewell event to Andrews upon his signing with TNA Wrestling. From mid-2015 to 2016, Dunne held the ATTACK! 24/7 Championship for an unprecedented 307 consecutive days, over which time he feuded with Eddie Dennis and Wild Boar simultaneously for the title. He would eventually lose the belt to referee Shay Purser, which acted as the beginning of a lengthy feud with ATTACK's co-founder and ring announcer Lee. Dunne's spell as a performer in ATTACK! Pro Wrestling concluded on 20 November 2016, when he lost a five-vs-five elimination match against a team captained by Lee, with the stipulation that the losing team captain had to leave ATTACK.

=== Michinoku Pro Wrestling (2013) ===
Dunne spent three months touring with Japanese promotion Michinoku Pro Wrestling in 2013, teaming with Jason Larusso to defeat Bad Boy (Daichi Sasaki and Manjimaru) in his debut match, but losing to the Brahman Brothers the next night. Dunne lost his next two matches on the tour, before defeating Ayumu Gunji in his first singles match in Japan. Dunne's final match on the tour took place on 5 May, when he and Larusso were defeated by Yapper Man #1 and Yapper Man #2.

=== Revolution Pro Wrestling (2014, 2016–2017, 2018) ===
Dunne at Revolution Pro Wrestling's Global Wars UK event in November 2016

Dunne made his debut for Revolution Pro Wrestling on 10 May 2014, teaming with F.S.U (Mark Andrews and Eddie Dennis) to take on The Revolutionists (Sha Samuels, Josh Bodom and Terry Frazier) in a losing effort. Dunne's next match was in January 2016 at Live At The Cockpit 5, first defeating El Ligero, and then Morgan Webster to win the RPW British Cruiserweight Championship. Dunne held the Championship until July, successfully defending it against Webster, Sonjay Dutt, A. C. H., Mike Bailey and Matt Cross before dropping the championship to Will Ospreay at Summer Sizzler. Dunne also competed at Global Wars UK, losing to Yuji Nagata on night one and Tomohiro Ishii on night two. On 21 January 2017, Dunne lost to NJPW's Yoshi-Hashi.

=== Progress Wrestling (2014, 2016–2019) ===
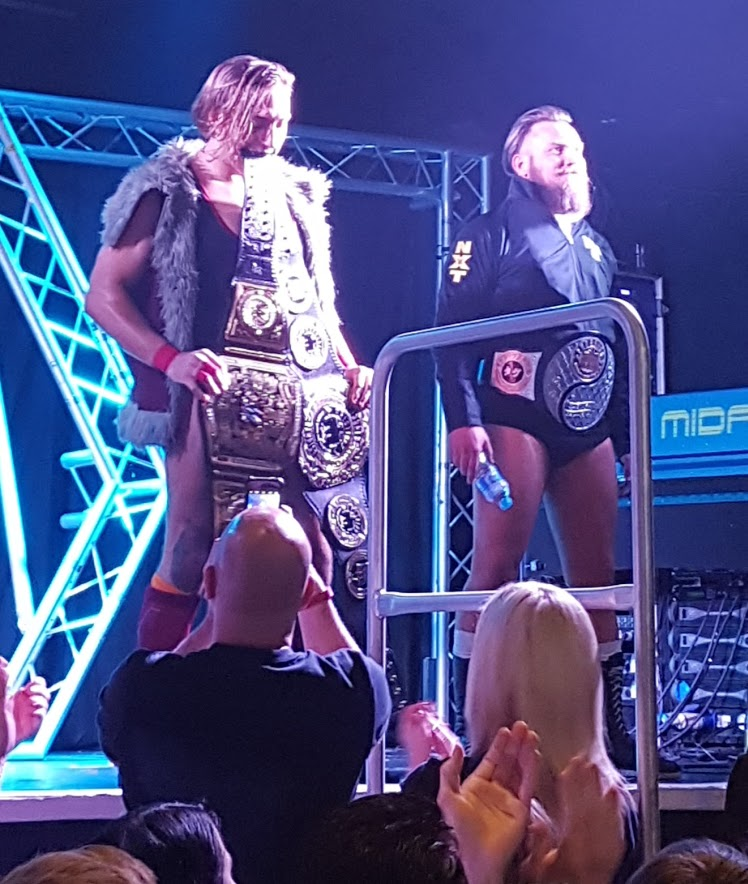
Dunne (left) as both the WWE United Kingdom and Progress Wrestling Champion along with fellow British Strong Style member Trent Seven

Dunne debuted in Progress at Chapter 13 on 18 May 2014, defeating Robbie X. Four months later, he returned to Progress, losing to Morgan Webster. Dunne was absent from Progress for 19 months after this, returning at Chapter 28 in April 2016, teaming with Damian Dunne to defeat Trent Seven and Tyler Bate. At Chapter 29, Dunne was involved in a qualifying match for WWE's Cruiserweight Classic tournament, losing to Jack Gallagher. At Chapter 30, Dunne competed in the first round of the Super Strong Style 16 Tournament, but was eliminated in the first round by Mark Haskins. At Chapter 33, Dunne turned on longtime tag team partner and kayfabe brother Damian Dunne, aligning himself with Trent Seven as British Strong Style. Dunne and Seven defeated The London Riots (James Davis and Rob Lynch) at Chapter 36 to win the Progress Tag Team Championship.

At Chapter 39, by virtue of retaining their championships in a rematch against the London Riots earlier in the night, Dunne and Seven were entered in a 7-man elimination match for the vacant Progress World Championship. Dunne pinned Jimmy Havoc to become the new Progress World Champion after Tyler Bate came down to the ring and attacked Havoc, aligning himself with Seven and Dunne. At Chapter 40, Dunne made his first successful defence of the championship, defeating Zack Sabre Jr. On 16 December, Progress management forced Dunne and Seven to vacate the Progress Tag Team Championship after Dunne attempted to give his half of the shield to Bate. At Chapter 41, British Strong Style once again left with all of the gold in Progress after Seven and Bate defeated the LDRS Of The New School (Marty Scurll and Zack Sabre Jr.) and The London Riots to win the Progress Tag Team Championships and Dunne defeated Fabian Aichner to retain the Progress World Championship. Dunne lost by disqualification to Jimmy Havoc at Chapter 43, but the championship did not change hands. At Chapter 44, Dunne, Seven and Bate were defeated by Havoc, Mark Haskins, and Morgan Webster in a six-man tag team match. At Chapter 45, Dunne defeated Havoc in a no-disqualification match for his fourth successful defence. At Chapter 46, he successfully defended the Championship against Mark Andrews. Dunne defended the Championship twice in Orlando, Florida during WrestleMania weekend, defeating Mark Haskins on 31 March and ACH on 1 April. At Chapter 47, Dunne, Seven and Bate put all of their championships on the line against Ringkampf (Axel Dieter Jr, Timothy Thatcher, and Walter), in a six-man tag team match, successfully retaining all of them. At Chapter 48, Dunne retained the title against both Andrews and Haskins in a triple threat match. He lost the title to Travis Banks on 10 September. At Chapter 60, Dunne successfully defended his WWE United Kingdom Championship against Jack Gallagher.

In May 2018, Dunne entered the Super Strong Style 16, defeating Doug Williams in the first round but losing by disqualification against Zack Gibson in the second round after hitting Gibson with a steel chair. The same weekend, Christian Michael Jakobi, the CEO of wXw, gave him a challenge against current wXw Unified World Wrestling Champion, Ilja Dragunov, who he'd call him the "Best Independent Wrestler in Europe". At Chapter 69: Be Here Now, he accepted the challenge, and defeated Dragunov at Chapter 76 which took place at Wembley Arena.

=== Chikara (2014–2017) ===
Dunne made his debut for Chikara in September 2014, when he, Damian Dunne and Mark Andrews, billed collectively as "Team UK", took part in the 2014 King of Trios, making it to the quarterfinals, before losing to The Devastation Corporation (Blaster McMassive, Flex Rumblecrunch and Max Smashmaster). A year later, Dunne returned for the 2015 King of Trios; this time he, Andrews and Morgan Webster, "Team Attack!", were eliminated in their first round match by United Nations (Juan Francisco de Coronado, Mr. Azerbaijan and The Proletariat Boar of Moldova).

Dunne returned to Chikara on 1 September 2017, when he, Trent Seven, and Tyler Bate, billed collectively as "House Strong Style", entered the 2017 King of Trios, defeating House Whitewolf (A-Kid, Adam Chase, and Zayas) in their first round match. Over the next two days, House Strong Style defeated House Throwbacks (Dasher Hatfield, Mark Angelosetti, and Simon Grimm) in the quarterfinals, House Rot (Frightmare, Hallowicked and Kobald) via forfeit in the semifinals and House Sendai Girls (Cassandra Miyagi, Dash Chisako, and Meiko Satomura) in the finals to win the 2017 King of Trios.

=== Singapore Pro Wrestling (2017–2018) ===
Dunne made his debut for SPW in October 2017, where he would face "The Statement" Andruew Tang, ultimately defeating him. Following the match, Dunne would promise Tang a rematch. In 2018, Dunne would return to face Tang, however appearing with Wolfgang and Mark Davis. The trio would be defeated by Andruew Tang, Kaiser Trexxus and Aiden Rex in a 3 on 3 match.

=== WWE (2017–present) ===
==== United Kingdom Champion (2017–2019) ====
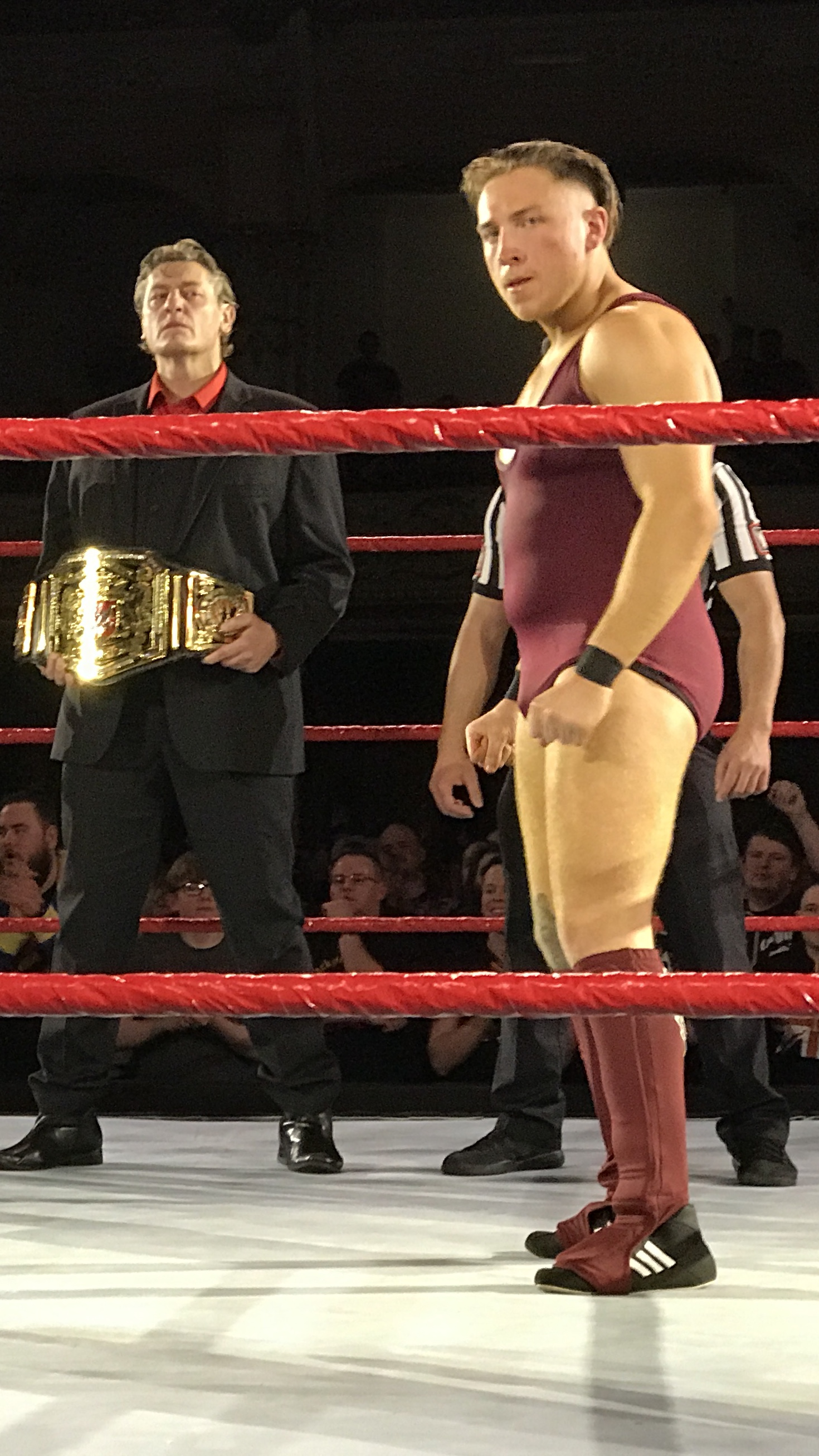
Dunne prior to the United Kingdom Championship Tournament final with William Regal in the background

On 15 December 2016, it was revealed that Dunne would be one of 16 men competing in the two-night United Kingdom Championship Tournament to crown the first ever WWE United Kingdom Champion on 14 and 15 January 2017. Dunne defeated Roy Johnson in the first round, advancing to the quarter finals and eventually the semi-finals where he defeated Sam Gradwell and Mark Andrews respectively to advance to the finals, where he lost to Tyler Bate. Dunne then signed a contract with WWE, which allowed him to continue taking independent bookings with some restrictions. He then became a part of NXT, making his debut on 22 February 2017 in a winning effort against Mark Andrews; he then started to appear on NXT. On 4 April, Dunne, and others who participated in the tournament, appeared on 205 Live to promote upcoming UK live shows.

On 7 May, Dunne defeated Trent Seven at a live event to become the new number one contender for the United Kingdom Championship. At NXT TakeOver: Chicago on 20 May, Dunne defeated Bate to win the title for the first time, which was later named Match of the Year at the NXT Year-End Awards. Dunne made his main roster debut during a one-off appearance on the 6 November episode of Raw in Manchester, England, defeating WWE Cruiserweight Champion Enzo Amore in a non-title champion versus champion match. He then kept on defending his title on NXT, first against Bate on 20 December, and then against Roderick Strong on 14 February 2018.

Dunne turned face when he and Strong subsequently teamed up, starting on 28 March for the Dusty Rhodes Tag Team Classic, defeating Danny Burch and Oney Lorcan in the first round and Alexander Wolfe and Eric Young of SAnitY in the semi-finals. They faced the Authors of Pain in the finals on 4 April; however, the match ended in a no contest when Kyle O'Reilly and Adam Cole of The Undisputed Era attacked both teams. As a result, all three teams faced each other in a triple threat tag team match at NXT TakeOver: New Orleans, which acted as the final match of the tournament while The Undisputed Era's NXT Tag Team Championship was also on the line. At the event on 7 April, Strong turned on Dunne and attacked him, giving the victory to The Undisputed Era and aligning himself with the stable. This began a feud between Dunne and The Undisputed Era, starting with a singles match on 2 May episode of NXT, in which he defeated Strong by disqualification after being attacked by Cole and O'Reilly.

At the United Kingdom Championship Tournament event on 18 June, Dunne teamed up with Tyler Bate and Trent Seven as British Strong Style on the first night (marking the first time they performed as their stable on WWE) to defeat The Undisputed Era, and on the second night, retained his title against United Kingdom Championship Tournament winner Zack Gibson. In July, the NXT UK brand was established, with the United Kingdom Championship as its top title; Dunne subsequently defended the title on both brands. On 22 August episode of NXT (which also served as the pre-show of NXT TakeOver: Brooklyn 4 on 18 August), Dunne once again retained his championship against Gibson; in parallel, he became the longest-reigning champion in WWE at (then) 456 days following Brock Lesnar's loss of the WWE Universal Championship at SummerSlam on 19 August.

On 29 August episode of NXT, Dunne teamed up with NXT North American Champion Ricochet against The Undisputed Era, losing due to a miscommunication. As both blamed the other for their loss, the two had a match for both titles on 19 September episode of NXT, marking the first time a WWE United Kingdom Champion faced a NXT North American Champion. The match ended in a no contest after The Undisputed Era attacked both men. After numerous attacks in the following weeks, Dunne eventually teamed up with Ricochet and the War Raiders to take on Undisputed Era at NXT TakeOver: WarGames in the titular match on 17 November, where his team would pick up the victory.

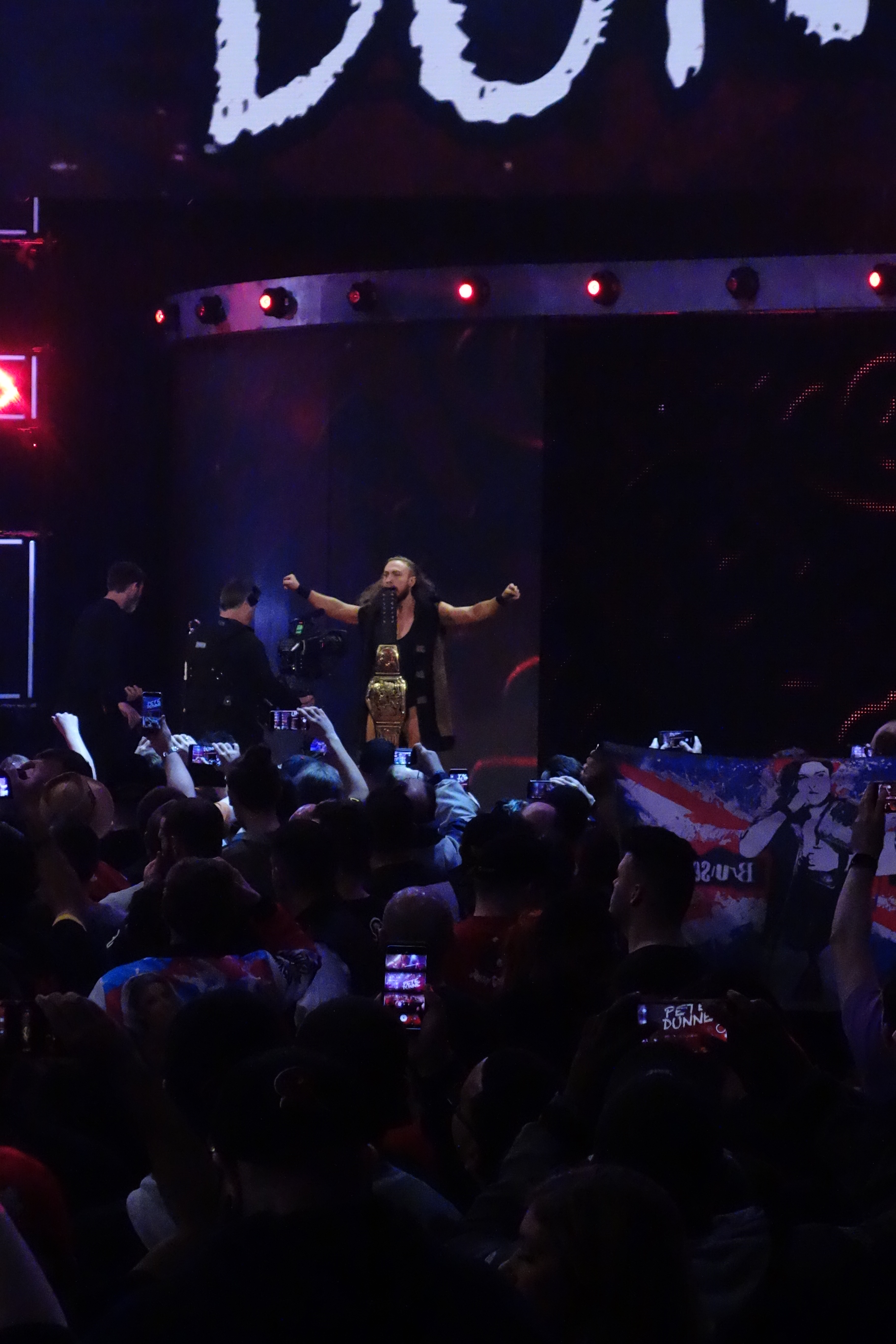
Dunne making his entrance at NXT TakeOver:New York

At NXT UK TakeOver: Blackpool on 12 January 2019, the inaugural NXT UK TakeOver event, Dunne retained his title against Joe Coffey in the main event. Two weeks later, Dunne appeared as a surprise entrant in the Royal Rumble match at the namesake pay-per-view on 27 January, but was eliminated by Drew McIntyre. At NXT TakeOver: New York on 5 April, Dunne lost the UK Championship to Walter, ending his record setting reign at 685 days. On 14 April episode of NXT UK (aired 22 May), Dunne lost his rematch against Walter for the United Kingdom Championship after interference by Fabian Aichner and Marcel Barthel, thus turning Walter heel. The following week, after Walter, Aichner, and Barthel named their group Imperium, Dunne joined the members of British Strong Style to brawl with Imperium in the ring.

==== The BroserWeights (2019–2020) ====
Dunne moved back from NXT UK to NXT in June 2019, rekindling his feud with Roderick Strong; after Strong started a feud of his own with NXT North American Champion Velveteen Dream, Dunne got involved on the 24 July episode of NXT, attacking Strong and indicating his desire to go after Dream's title. The three faced off in a triple threat match for the title at NXT TakeOver: Toronto on 10 August, where Dream retained his title. Dunne would then go on with a three-way feud against Damian Priest and Killian Dain, culminating in a Triple threat match to determine the #1 contender for the NXT Championship at Survivor Series, which he won. At Survivor Series on 24 November, he was unsuccessful in his match against Cole.

On 10 January 2020 episode of NXT, the participants of the 2020 Dusty Rhodes Tag Team Classic were announced, with Dunne and Matt Riddle being announced as surprise participants; they would later take on the name of The BroserWeights, a portmanteau of Dunne's "Bruiserweight" nickname and Riddle's "Original Bro" nickname. Together, they defeated Mark Andrews and Flash Morgan Webster in the first round on 15 January, Fabian Aichner and Marcel Barthel of Imperium in the semifinals on 22 January, and Grizzled Young Veterans (James Drake and Zack Gibson) in the finals on 29 January to win the tournament and earn a match against Bobby Fish and Kyle O'Reilly of The Undisputed Era for the NXT Tag Team Championship at NXT TakeOver: Portland. At the event on 16 February, Dunne and Riddle defeated Fish and O'Reilly to win the titles.

After a successful title defense with Riddle against Fish and O'Reilly on 11 March episode of NXT, Dunne became inactive due to being unable to travel to the U.S. during the COVID-19 pandemic. In his absence, Riddle teamed-up with Timothy Thatcher as Dunne's replacement (although he wasn't considered co-champion), until 13 May episode of NXT where Thatcher walked out during a title defense, leading Riddle to lose his and Dunne's titles to Aichner and Barthel. After he stopped appearing on NXT due to the pandemic, Dunne remained inactive from March to October 2020; meanwhile, Riddle moved to the SmackDown brand, resuming his activities as a singles wrestler.

==== Kings of NXT (2020–2022) ====
On 17 September, Dunne made his return to NXT UK as a producer. Dunne eventually made a temporary return on the NXT UK brand on 15 October episode of NXT UK, teaming up with Ilja Dragunov to defeat NXT UK Champion Walter and Alexander Wolfe of Imperium.

On 28 October at Halloween Havoc, Dunne returned to NXT, attacking Kyle O'Reilly and joining Pat McAfee's Kings of NXT stable alongside Danny Burch and Oney Lorcan, turning heel in the process. The Kings of NXT faced against Undisputed Era at WarGames on 6 December, where Dunne was the first competitor from Team McAfee to enter the match along with O'Reilly. Team McAfee lost the match when O'Reilly pinned Lorcan. Dunne faced Finn Bálor at Vengeance Day on 14 February for Bálor's NXT Championship in a losing effort. Dunne then entered a feud with Kushida, whom he defeated on 7 April at Stand & Deliver. The Kings of NXT quietly disbanded when McAfee moved to SmackDown as a color commentator. On 27 July episode of NXT, Ridge Holland returned from injury by attacking Tommaso Ciampa and Timothy Thatcher after Dunne and Lorcan's match against the latter, joining their alliance.

The alliance was short lived when Holland was called up to SmackDown, and Lorcan and Burch were released as part of mass layoffs. A now solo Dunne started feuding with the debuting Tony D'Angelo, and subsequently turned face to join team Black and Gold, already consisting of Ciampa, Gargano and Knight for WarGames on 5 December, losing to Team 2.0, consisting of D'Angelo, Bron Breakker, Carmelo Hayes, and Grayson Waller. On 21 December episode of NXT, Dunne defeated D'Angelo but was brutally attacked by D'Angelo with a crowbar afterwards. On 11 January 2022 episode of NXT, Dunne lost to D'Angelo in a Crowbar on a Pole match. On 15 February at Vengeance Day, Dunne defeated D'Angelo in a weaponized steel cage match to end their feud. On 1 March episode of NXT, Dunne faced Carmelo Hayes for the NXT North American Championship in a losing effort, which turned out to be his final appearance for the brand.

==== The Brawling Brutes (2022–2023) ====
On 11 March episode of SmackDown, Dunne made his official main roster debut under the new ring name Butch, aligning himself with Ridge Holland and Sheamus in their feud against The New Day, establishing himself as a heel. On 8 April episode of SmackDown, Butch competed in his first match on the brand, where he was defeated by Xavier Woods. On 16 September episode of SmackDown, Butch and Holland won a fatal four-way tag team match to become the #1 contenders for the Undisputed WWE Tag Team Championship. The following week, they faced the champions The Usos for the titles in a losing effort after interference from Imperium. They had another opportunity at Crown Jewel on 5 November but lost again. Butch would later enter a feud with The Bloodline with help from his stable mates, Kevin Owens and Drew McIntyre. This would culminate at Survivor Series: WarGames on 26 November in a WarGames match which they lost.

On the 9 June 2023 episode of SmackDown, Butch defeated Baron Corbin to qualify for the men's Money in the Bank ladder match.; however, Damian Priest would win the match at the namesake event. The Brawling Brutes all competed in a 25-man battle royal at SummerSlam, but none of them were successful in winning. Sheamus would be removed from television in late-August due to a shoulder injury, leaving him and Holland on their own. Later in the year, Butch would be invited to the NXT Global Heritage Invitational on WWE's developmental brand, NXT. He would be put in Group A alongside Tyler Bate, Axiom, and Charlie Dempsey. Butch would top the group and face the winner of Group B, Joe Coffey. Butch would win the match against Coffey to be the number one contender to face Noam Dar for the NXT Heritage Cup at NXT No Mercy. However, Butch would be unsuccessful in winning the Heritage Cup. On the 17 November episode of SmackDown, visible dissension appeared between Holland and Butch after a loss to the Street Profits. One week later, Holland walked out on Butch during a tag team match against Pretty Deadly, resulting in a loss in what would be their final match as a team.

==== New Catch Republic; Los Americanos (2024–present) ====
Butch reunited with Tyler Bate, who got promoted to SmackDown on 5 January 2024 at SmackDown: New Year's Revolution, to reform British Strong Style. On 19 January episode of SmackDown, Butch returned to his original ring name, Pete Dunne, and they defeated Pretty Deadly in a rematch from SmackDown: New Year's Revolution. On 23 February episode of SmackDown, the team was renamed to New Catch Republic. New Catch Republic won the Undisputed WWE Tag Team Championship Contender Series for an Undisputed WWE Tag Team Championship match at Elimination Chamber: Perth, but failed to defeat The Judgment Day (Finn Bálor and Damian Priest) for the titles at the event. At Night 1 of WrestleMania XL, New Catch Republic participated in a six-pack tag team ladder match for the Undisputed WWE Tag Team Championship, but failed to win any of the tag titles. At 2024 WWE Draft, New Catch Republic were drafted to the Raw brand in the supplemental draft. In July, Bate was reportedly sidelined for a torn pectoral muscle after he suffered an injury, putting the team on hiatus.

On the March 31, 2025 edition of Raw, New Catch Republic made their tag team return. On the July 28, 2025 episode of Raw, Dunne portrayed a decoy version of the masked character El Grande Americano along with Tyler Bate, collectively known as Los Americanos. In the same month, it was reported that Dunne had begun working as a producer for WWE's sister promotion Lucha Libre AAA Worldwide. On the September 29 episode of Raw, he was given the new name Rayo Americano while Bate was given the name Bravo Americano.

== Professional wrestling style and persona ==
Dunne is nicknamed "The Bruiserweight" in reference to both his weight class and wrestling style, which mostly consists of brawling, stiff strikes, submission grappling, and bending of his opponents' fingers. His finishing maneuver is a pumphandle reverse STO called the Bitter End which was originally called Drop Dead. He then transitioned into a more manic and aggressive style when he adopted the Butch character on the main roster.

== Other ventures ==
Alongside fellow wrestlers Mark Andrews and Eddie Dennis, England co-founded Defend Indy Wrestling, a clothing line for independent wrestling fans. Inspired by the "Defend Pop Punk" message made popular by American pop punk band Man Overboard, the trio created the brand in 2011 to produce clothes and other merchandise.

== Personal life ==
Like his British Strong Style teammates Tyler Bate and Trent Seven, England became a vegan after watching the 2014 documentary Cowspiracy.

== Other media ==
Dunne is a playable character in the video games WWE 2K19, WWE 2K20, and WWE 2K22 and WWE 2K25 as Pete Dunne, and in WWE 2K23 and WWE 2K24 as Butch.

== Championships and accomplishments ==
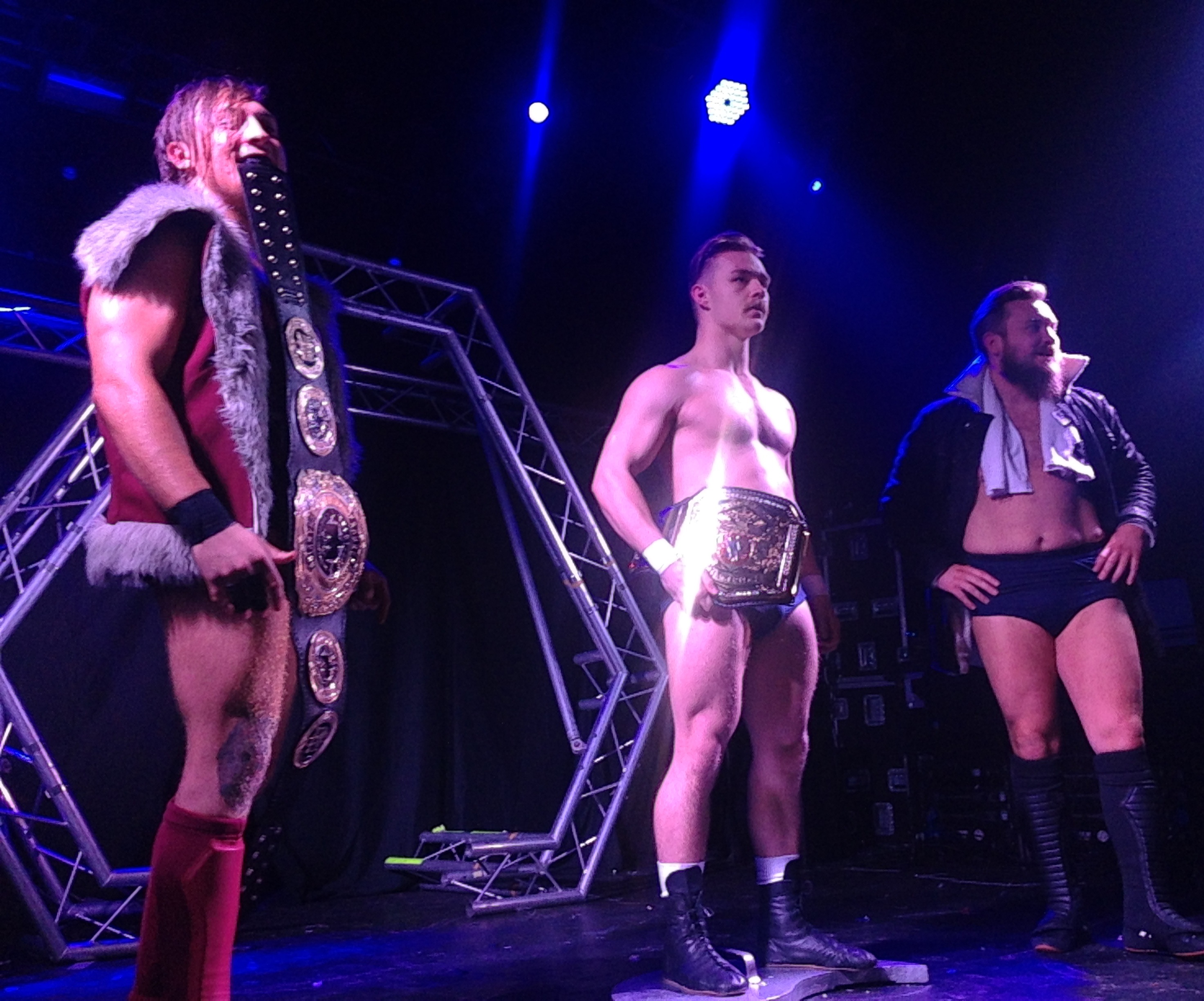
Dunne (left) as Progress World Champion with his British Strong Style partners Tyler Bate (centre) and Trent Seven (right)

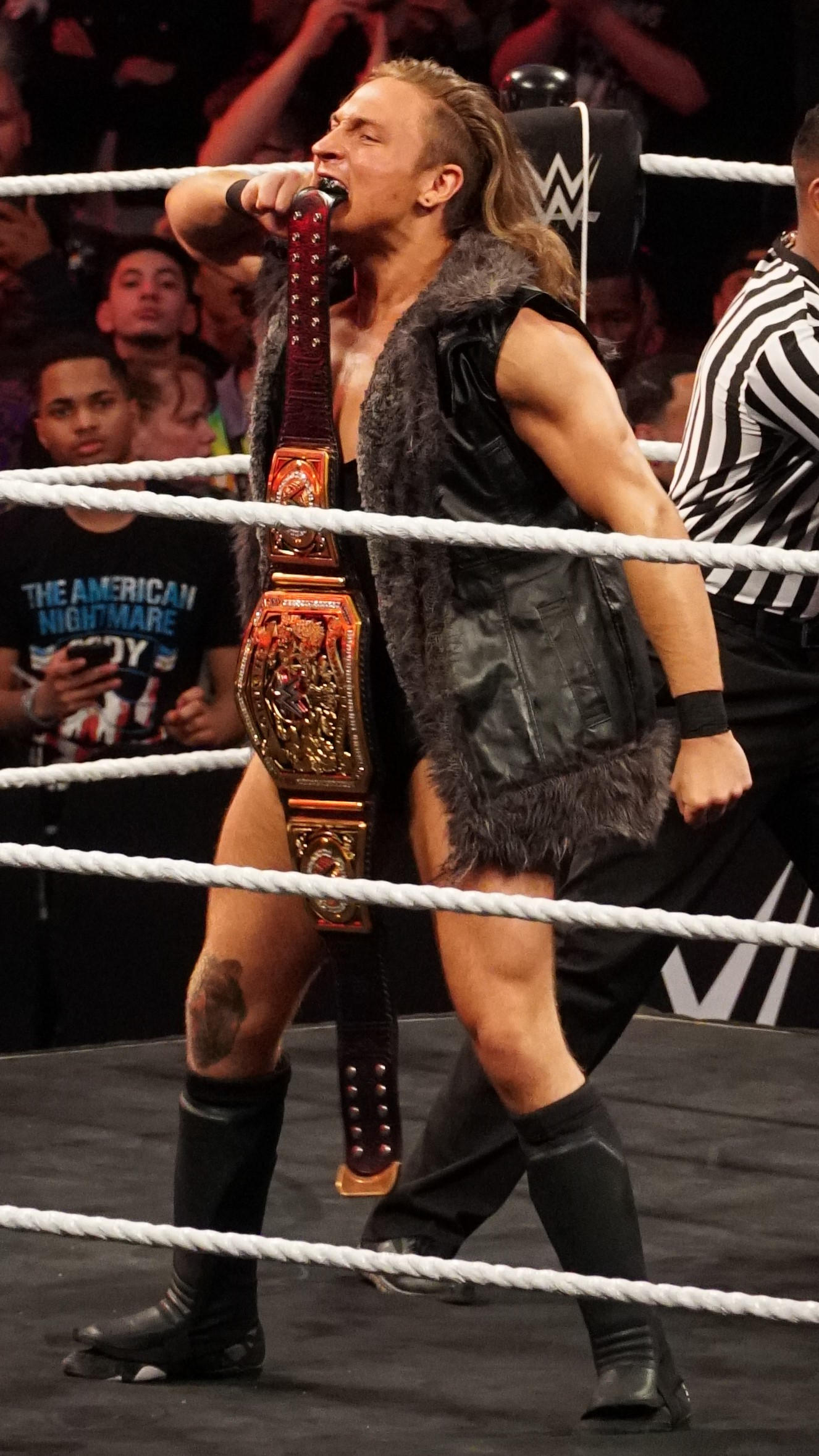
Dunne is a one-time WWE United Kingdom Champion

- 4 Front Wrestling
  - 4FW Junior Heavyweight Championship (1 time)
- Alternative Wrestling World
  - AWW British Tag Team Championship (1 time) – with Damian Dunne
- Attack! Pro Wrestling
  - Attack! 24/7 Championship (6 times) (Note: Dunne's third reign was shared with Mark Andrews.)
  - Elder Stein Invitational (2012)
- Chikara
  - King of Trios (2017) – with Trent Seven and Tyler Bate
- Royal Imperial Wrestling
  - RIW Heavyweight Championship (1 time, inaugural)
  - RIW Heavyweight Title Tournament (2012)
- Destiny World Wrestling
  - DWW Championship (1 time)
- Dublin Championship Wrestling
  - DCW Tag Team Championships (1 time) – with Damian Dunne
- ESPN
  - Ranked No. 12 of the 30 best Pro Wrestlers Under 30 in 2023
- Fight Club:Pro
  - FCP Championship (1 time)
  - FCP Tag Team Championships (1 time) – with Trent Seven
  - Infinity Trophy (2015)
- FutureShock Wrestling
  - FSW Adrenaline Championship (1 time)
- Kamikaze Pro
  - Relentless Division Championship (1 time)
- No Limits Wrestling
  - NLW Heavyweight Championship (1 time)
- Over the Top Wrestling
  - OTT No Limits Championship (1 times)
  - OTT Tag Team Championship (1 time) – with Tyler Bate and Trent Seven
- Pro Wrestling Illustrated
  - Ranked No. 29 of the top 500 singles wrestlers in the PWI 500 in 2017
- Pro Wrestling Kingdom
  - Pro Wrestling Kingdom Championship (1 time, inaugural, final)
  - Pro Wrestling Kingdom Title Tournament (2013)
- Progress Wrestling
  - Progress World Championship (1 time)
  - Progress Tag Team Championship (1 time) – with Trent Seven
- Revolution Pro Wrestling
  - RPW British Cruiserweight Championship (1 time)
  - British Cruiserweight Title Tournament (2016)
- Southside Wrestling Entertainment
  - Young Tigers Cup (2015)
- The Wrestling Revolver
  - Revolver Tag Team Championship (1 time) – with Millie McKenzie
- VII Pro Wrestling
  - VII Pro Championship (6 time)
  - VII Trifecta Trophy Tournament – with CJ Banks and Dan Moloney
- Westside Xtreme Wrestling
  - wXw Shotgun Championship (1 time)
- WWE
  - NXT Tag Team Championship (1 time) – with Matt Riddle
  - WWE United Kingdom Championship (1 time)
  - Dusty Rhodes Tag Team Classic (2020) – with Matt Riddle
  - NXT Global Heritage Invitational (2023)
  - Undisputed WWE Tag Team Championship Contender Series (2024) – with Tyler Bate
  - WWE Speed Championship #1 Contender Tournament (July 31–August 30, 2024)
  - NXT Tag Team Championship #1 Contender's Tournament (2026) – with Bravo Americano
  - NXT Year-End Award (1 time)
    - Match of the Year (2017) – vs. Tyler Bate at NXT TakeOver: Chicago

== Luchas de Apuestas record ==
Winner (wager)	Loser (wager)	Location	Event	Date	Notes
Helix (hair)	Tiger Kid (mask)	Kent, England	Riot Act Wrestling	January 2010	
