= NXT TakeOver: The End =

2016 WWE Network event

- Promotional logo
- Promotion: WWE
- Brand: NXT
- Date: June 8, 2016
- City: Winter Park, Florida
- Venue: Full Sail University
- Attendance: 400+ (Sold Out)

WWE event chronology
← Previous; Extreme Rules	Next → Money in the Bank

NXT TakeOver chronology
← Previous; Dallas	Next → Brooklyn II

NXT TakeOver: The End, also called NXT TakeOver: The End... of the Beginning, was a professional wrestling livestreaming event produced by WWE, held exclusively for wrestlers from the promotion's developmental territory, NXT. It was the 10th NXT TakeOver event and took place on Wednesday, June 8, 2016, airing exclusively on the WWE Network. The event's name stemmed from this being the final TakeOver event to take place at NXT's home venue at the time, Full Sail University in Winter Park, Florida, although due to the COVID-19 pandemic in 2020, all NXT events were held at Full Sail until October that year when NXT's events were moved to the WWE Performance Center in Orlando, Florida.

Five matches were contested at the event. In the main event, Samoa Joe defeated "The Demon" Finn Bálor in a Steel Cage match to retain the NXT Championship. In other prominent matches, Asuka defeated Nia Jax to retain the NXT Women's Championship and The Revival (Dash Wilder and Scott Dawson) defeated American Alpha (Chad Gable and Jason Jordan) to win the NXT Tag Team Championship.

== Production ==
=== Background ===
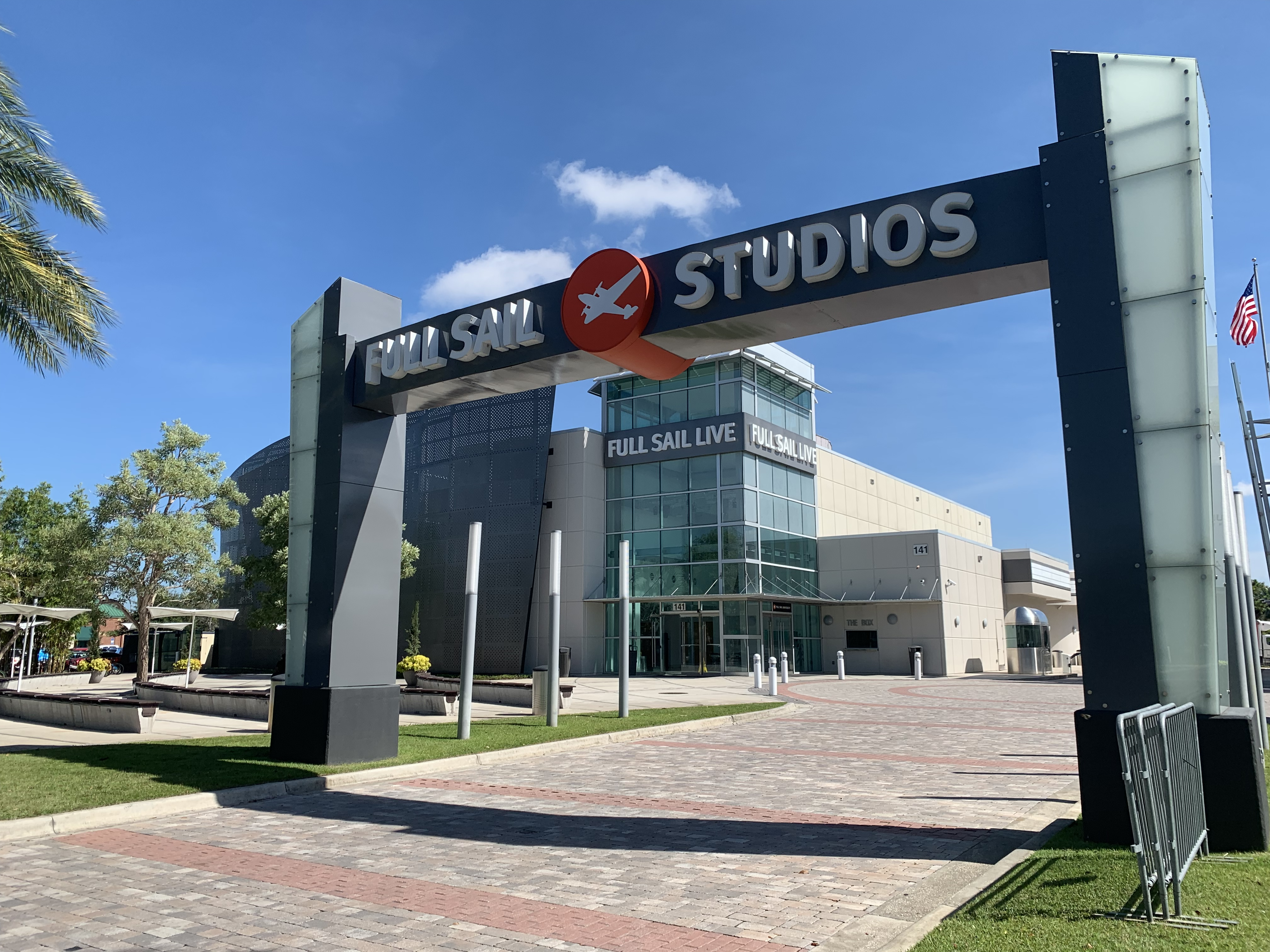
The 10th NXT TakeOver event was held at NXT's home venue at the time, Full Sail University in Winter Park, Florida. This was intended to be the final TakeOver held at the venue, but the COVID-19 pandemic in 2020 necessitated the move back to Full Sail that summer.

TakeOver was a series of professional wrestling events that began in May 2014, as WWE's developmental territory, NXT, held its second WWE Network-exclusive livestreaming event, billed as TakeOver. The "TakeOver" moniker subsequently became the branding for all of NXT's major events held periodically throughout the year. The End was scheduled as the 10th TakeOver event and was also called "The End... of the Beginning". It was held on Saturday, June 8, 2016. The name "The End" stemmed from the original intention of this being the final TakeOver event to take place at NXT's home venue at the time, Full Sail University in Winter Park, Florida.

=== Storylines ===
The event comprised five matches that resulted from scripted storylines. Results were predetermined by WWE's writers on the NXT brand, while storylines were produced on WWE's weekly television program, NXT.

On April 21, at a house show in Lowell, Massachusetts, Samoa Joe defeated Finn Bálor to win the NXT Championship. On the May 11 episode of NXT, NXT General Manager William Regal scheduled a rematch at TakeOver: The End. Throughout various house shows, the duo were unable to refrain from engaging in all out brawls, and on May 17, during a contract signing at WWE Performance Center, the match was made a Steel Cage match. This marked the first ever Steel Cage match in NXT history.

At TakeOver: Dallas, American Alpha (Chad Gable and Jason Jordan) defeated The Revival (Dash Wilder and Scott Dawson) to capture the NXT Tag Team Championship. On the May 18 episode of NXT, William Regal made the rematch official at TakeOver: The End.

On the May 18 episode of NXT, Nia Jax defeated former NXT Women's Champion Bayley. Following Bayley's loss and her inability to perform at 100%, on the May 25 episode, Jax defeated Carmella and Alexa Bliss in a triple threat #1 contender match, and would face reigning champion, Asuka, at TakeOver: The End.

On the May 25 episode of NXT, Austin Aries declared his intention to become the next NXT Champion, which prompted a response from Shinsuke Nakamura. William Regal would then schedule a match between Nakamura and Aries at TakeOver: The End.

On June 2, William Regal announced that Tye Dillinger would face Andrade Cien Almas at TakeOver: The End.

== Event ==
Other on-screen personnel
Role	Name
Commentators	Tom Phillips
Commentators	Corey Graves
Ring announcer	Greg Hamilton
Pre-show panel	Renee Young
Pre-show panel	Lita
Pre-show panel	Corey Graves
Referees	Drake Wuertz
Referees	Shawn Bennett
Referees	Eddie Orengo
Referees	Danilo Anfibio

=== Preliminary matches ===
The event opened with Andrade Cien Almas facing Tye Dillinger. In the end, Almas performed a running double knee smash on Dillinger, who was cornered, to win the match.

Next, American Alpha (Jason Jordan and Chad Gable) defended the NXT Tag Team Championship against The Revival (Scott Dawson and Dash Wilder). In the end, The Revival executed the "Shatter Machine" on Jordan to regain the titles. Post-match, American Alpha were ambushed and attacked by two men wearing black (later referred to as The Authors of Pain, Akam and Rezar). Paul Ellering emerged and accompanied the duo backstage.

After that, Shinsuke Nakamura faced Austin Aries. During the match, Aries applied the "Last Chancery" but Nakamura reached the ropes to break the hold. After Aries executed a Death Valley driver on the ring apron on Nakamura, he attempted a suicide dive but Nakamura avoided Aries, who collided with the guardrail. In the end, Nakamura executed a "Kinshasa" off the middle rope, an inverted powerslam and a "Kinshasa" on Aries for the win.

In the penultimate match, Asuka defended the NXT Women's Championship against Nia Jax. In the end, Asuka executed a roundhouse kick, a spin kick, and two more kicks on Jax to retain the title.

=== Main event ===
In the main event, Samoa Joe defended the NXT Championship against "The Demon" Finn Bálor in a Steel Cage match. During the match, Bálor executed a super Sling Blade for a near-fall. Joe executed a muscle buster on Bálor for a near-fall. Balor executed a "Coup de Grâce" on Joe for a near-fall. In the end, Bálor attempted to escape the cage after escaping the "Coquina Clutch", but Joe executed a super muscle buster to retain the title.

== Reception ==
NXT TakeOver: The End received positive reviews. Professional wrestling commentator Jim Ross described the event as "compelling" and "entertaining" television, with positives in several aspects: booking, "in ring action", move execution and TV production. Ross was "proud of" the "efficient" commentary by Philips and Graves, which helped by "focusing in the action and diligently trying to get the talents over". For the matches, the main event was "classic", the women's title match showed off engaging "physicality", Nakamura-Aries "was one of the best TV matches on WWE TV in recent memory", and finally, "NXT has done a notable job making their tag team scene have significant meaning".

James Caldwell of Pro Wrestling Torch reviewed each match out of 5 stars. The "surprisingly quick" match for Almas-Dillinger was the poorest rated 2.0 stars. Caldwell commended Almas for "a money look and tons of charisma". The "super-hot tag match" was rated 3.75 stars; Caldwell described the outcome as "stunning" and praised all four men's work in the match. Aries-Nakamura was the best rated match at 4.25 stars: although "methodical early on", it reached "an epic conclusion". Aries was highlighted for "fire and in-ring ability", while Nakamura had "superior skills" and an "amazing" entrance. Asuka-Jax was rated 2.75 stars as both women gave a "fine display", with Asuka showing "underdog fire" and Jax "as a dominant force ... done in by her hubris". Bálor-Joe was rated 3.5 stars, "a very good main event", but due to a predictable match result, the "tired concept" of cage matches, and "close camera work" without "intimacy", it "just didn't seem to come together as the total package to 'end an era' for NXT".

Jim Varsallone of the Miami Herald wrote that the event was "another action-packed, crowd-pleasing NXT TakeOver special" in front of a "very amp'd crowd". Ultimately, The End showed how NXT "continues to develop and grow into its own white hot brand". Varsallone credited how "those who started the NXT phenomenon" (examples include male wrestler Kevin Owens, female wrestler Sasha Banks, tag team Enzo Amore and Colin Cassady, manager Lana, and referee Jason Ayers) have already transitioned to WWE's main roster, so now "it's time for the next group to step up, and they are" indeed shining. For the matches, the tag title match was "stellar", Aries-Nakamura was a "dream matchup", while Almas-Dillinger was "really good" and enhanced by the crowd supporting both wrestlers. Varsallone also listed a variety of chants for each match by fans.

Jason Powell of Pro Wrestling Dot Net thought that The End was "another excellent NXT Takeover special", "never a dull moment" despite less "buzz". Powell thought that the "strong, dramatic" main event had enough uncertainty as to its outcome to make "the near falls count". For the other title matches, the women match was "entertaining" although it "won't compete for best of the night", while the tag match was "excellent" and even better than their previous matchup at NXT TakeOver: Dallas. As a sidenote, Powell wrote, "As a longtime fan, I love the use of Ellering, who looks tremendous for his age". Meanwhile, Aries-Nakamura was "a hell of a match" with Powell enjoying how "Aries looked so strong in defeat". Lastly, in the opener, "Almas showed some tremendous athleticism, and Dillinger played his part in the match very nicely".

== Aftermath ==
While TakeOver: The End had been promoted as the final TakeOver to be held at Full Sail University, the COVID-19 pandemic in 2020 necessitated the need to return all of NXT's events to this venue, as beginning in March that year, WWE had to stop touring and all events had to be held behind closed doors. In turn, TakeOver: In Your House in June and TakeOver XXX in August were held at Full Sail before all NXT events were moved to the WWE Performance Center in Orlando, Florida, beginning with TakeOver 31 in October. NXT would return once more to Full Sail in September 2025 for a television special titled NXT: Homecoming.

== Results ==
No.	Results	Stipulations	Times
1	Andrade Cien Almas defeated Tye Dillinger by pinfall	Singles match	5:22
2	The Revival (Dash Wilder and Scott Dawson) defeated American Alpha (Chad Gable and Jason Jordan) (c) by pinfall	Tag team match for the NXT Tag Team Championship	15:56
3	Shinsuke Nakamura defeated Austin Aries by pinfall	Singles match	17:26
4	Asuka (c) defeated Nia Jax by pinfall	Singles match for the NXT Women's Championship	9:11
5	Samoa Joe (c) defeated "The Demon" Finn Bálor by pinfall	Steel Cage match for the NXT Championship	16:09
(c) / – the champion(s) heading into the match
