= NXT Tag Team Championship =

WWE men's professional wrestling championship

- The current NXT Tag Team Championship belt with default side plates (2017–present)

Details
- Promotion: WWE
- Brand: NXT
- Date established: January 23, 2013
- Current champions: The Vanity Project (Brad Baylor and Ricky Smokes)
- Date won: August 30, 2026
Statistics
- First champions: British Ambition (Adrian Neville and Oliver Grey)
- Most reigns: As a tag team (3 reigns): The Undisputed Era (Note: During their first reign, Adam Cole, Kyle O'Reilly, Bobby Fish, and Roderick Strong were all recognized as champion under the Freebird Rule. During their second reign, only O'Reilly and Strong were recognized as champion, while during their third reign, only Fish and O'Reilly were recognized as champion.); As an individual (3 reigns): Kyle O'Reilly
- Longest reign: The Ascension (Conor O'Brian/Konnor and Rick Victor/Viktor) (364 days) (Note: WWE officially recognizes it as 343 days, but still the longest.)
- Shortest reign: Moustache Mountain (Tyler Bate and Trent Seven) (2 days) (Note: WWE officially recognizes it as 22 days due to tape delay; the shortest reign recognized by WWE is MSK's second reign at 6 days (5 days according to their title history).)
- Oldest champion: Matt Hardy (51 years, 14 days)
- Youngest champion: Tyler Bate (21 years, 104 days)
- Heaviest champion: The Authors of Pain (Akam and Rezar) (629 lb (285 kg) combined)
- Lightest champion: Nathan Frazer and Axiom (336 lb (152 kg) combined)

The NXT Tag Team Championship is a men's professional wrestling tag team championship created and promoted by the American promotion WWE. It is defended on NXT, the promotion's developmental brand. The current champions are The Vanity Project (Brad Baylor and Ricky Smokes), who are in their second reign, both as a team and individually. They won the title by defeating Myles Borne and Tavion Heights at Heatwave on August 30, 2026.

Established on January 23, 2013, the inaugural championship team was British Ambition (Adrian Neville and Oliver Grey). In September 2019, the company began promoting NXT as its "third brand" when the NXT television program was moved to the USA Network. Two years later, however, NXT reverted to its original function as WWE's developmental brand. In September 2022, the NXT UK Tag Team Championship was unified into the NXT Tag Team Championship.

== History ==
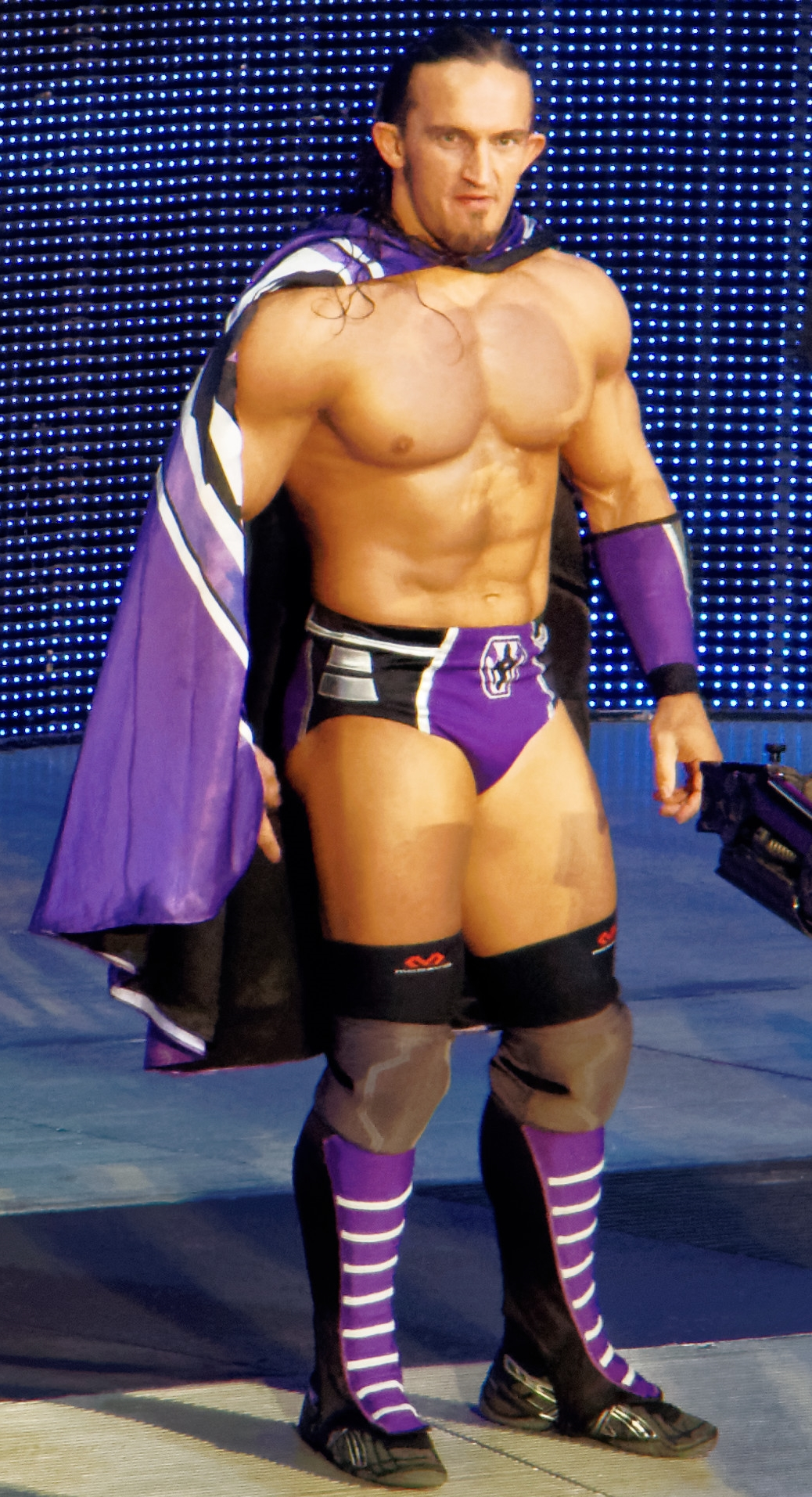
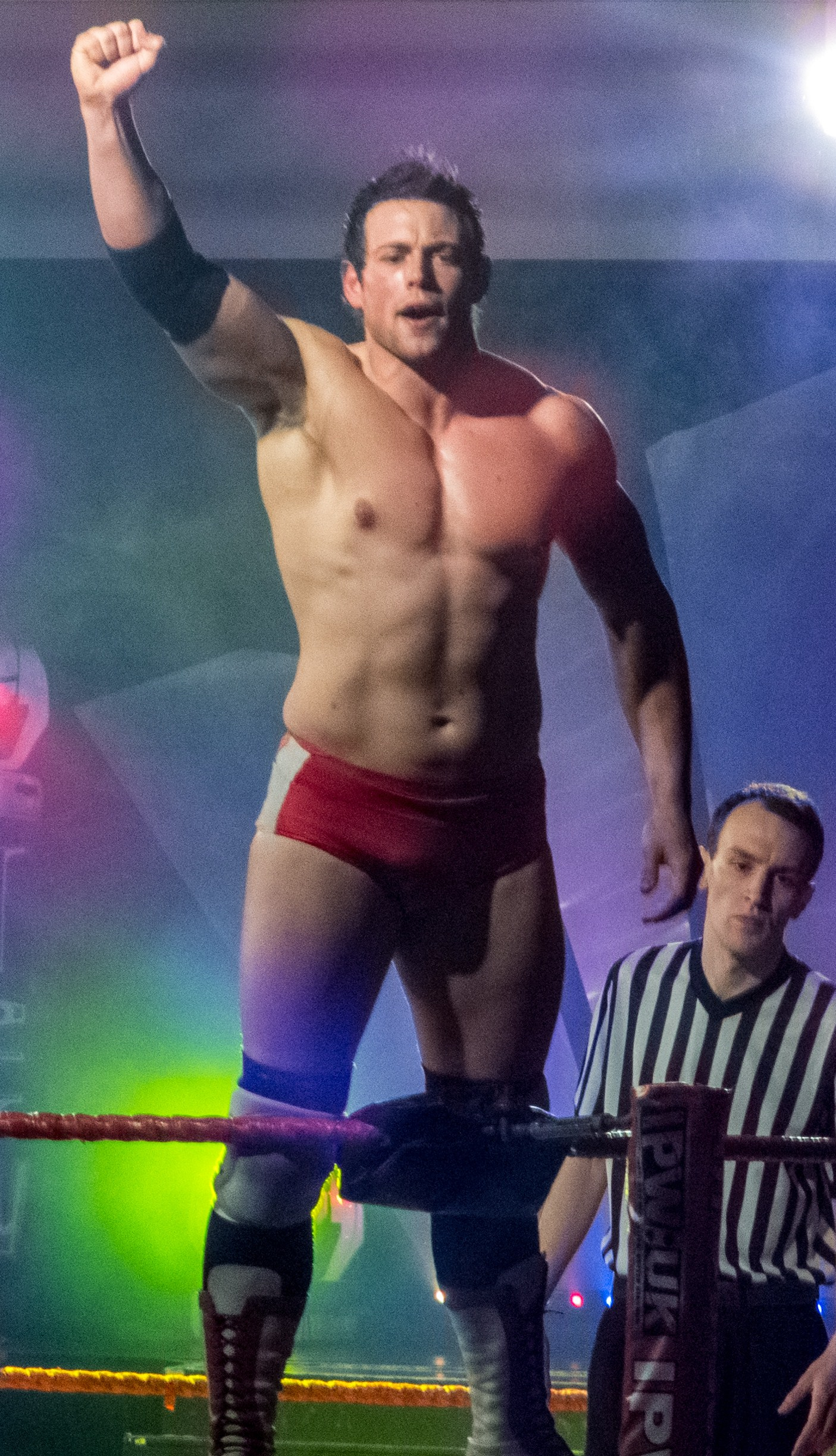
The inaugural champions, The British Ambition: Adrian Neville (left) and Oliver Grey (right)

In June 2012, WWE established NXT as their developmental territory, replacing Florida Championship Wrestling (FCW). The following year on the January 23 episode of NXT, special guest and WWE Hall of Famer Shawn Michaels announced that there would be an eight-team single-elimination tournament to crown the first NXT Tag Team Champions. On the January 31 taping of NXT (aired February 13), British Ambition (Adrian Neville and Oliver Grey) defeated The Wyatt Family (Luke Harper and Erick Rowan) in the tournament final to become the inaugural champions. In the first title defense, however, Neville and Bo Dallas defended the title against The Wyatt Family due to Grey being injured, where they lost; Dallas was not recognized as champion. On the June 20 taping of NXT (aired July 17), Neville and Corey Graves defeated The Wyatt Family for the title, making Neville the first two-time champion. On June 8, 2016, The Revival (Scott Dawson and Dash Wilder) became the first team to hold the championship on more than one occasion when they defeated American Alpha (Chad Gable and Jason Jordan) at TakeOver: The End.

Although NXT had been established as WWE's developmental territory, over the years it grew to establish itself as WWE's third major brand. This would become official in September 2019 when NXT was moved to the USA Network, thus making the NXT Tag Team Championship the third men's world tag team championship in WWE along with the WWE Raw Tag Team Championship and the WWE SmackDown Tag Team Championship. In September 2021, WWE revamped NXT and returned the brand to its original function as a developmental territory.

In August 2022, WWE announced that the NXT UK brand would go on hiatus and would relaunch as NXT Europe at a later time. As such, NXT UK's championships were unified into their respective NXT championship counterparts. On September 4, 2022, at Worlds Collide, Pretty Deadly (Elton Prince and Kit Wilson) defeated Gallus (Mark Coffey and Wolfgang), reigning NXT Tag Team Champions The Creed Brothers (Brutus Creed and Julius Creed), and NXT UK Tag Team Champions Brooks Jensen and Josh Briggs in a fatal four-way tag team elimination match to unify the NXT UK Tag Team Championship into the NXT Tag Team Championship. Jensen and Briggs were recognized as the final NXT UK Tag Team Champions, while Pretty Deadly went forward as the unified NXT Tag Team Champions.

The NXT Tag Team Championship became the first WWE championship to be defended in Total Nonstop Action Wrestling (TNA), where Nathan Frazer and Axiom successfully defended the title against The Rascalz (Zachary Wentz and Trey Miguel) on the January 23, 2025, episode of Impact!. The Hardy Boyz (Jeff Hardy and Matt Hardy) would then become the first TNA contracted wrestlers to win a WWE championship when they won the NXT Tag Team Championship by defeating DarkState (Dion Lennox and Osiris Griffin) in a Winners Take All match, in which The Hardy Boyz defended the TNA World Tag Team Championship, at NXT vs. TNA Showdown on October 7, 2025.

=== Inaugural tournament ===
1st Round; NXT; January 10, 2013 (Aired: January 23–30)
The Wyatt Family (Luke Harper and Erick Rowan)	Pinfall
Percy Watson and Yoshi Tatsu	4:53
Bo Dallas and Michael McGillicutty	Pinfall
Primo and Epico	12:24
British Ambition (Adrian Neville and Oliver Grey)	Pinfall
3MB (Drew McIntyre and Heath Slater)	8:25
Kassius Ohno and Leo Kruger	Submission
Alex Riley and Derrick Bateman	12:52

Semifinals; NXT; January 10, 2023 (Aired: February 6)
The Wyatt Family (Luke Harper and Erick Rowan)	Pinfall
Bo Dallas and Michael McGillicutty	6:11
British Ambition	Pinfall
Kassius Ohno and Leo Kruger	16:07

Final; NXT; January 31, 2013 (Aired: February 13)
The Wyatt Family (Luke Harper and Erick Rowan)	15:55
British Ambition	Pinfall

== Belt designs ==
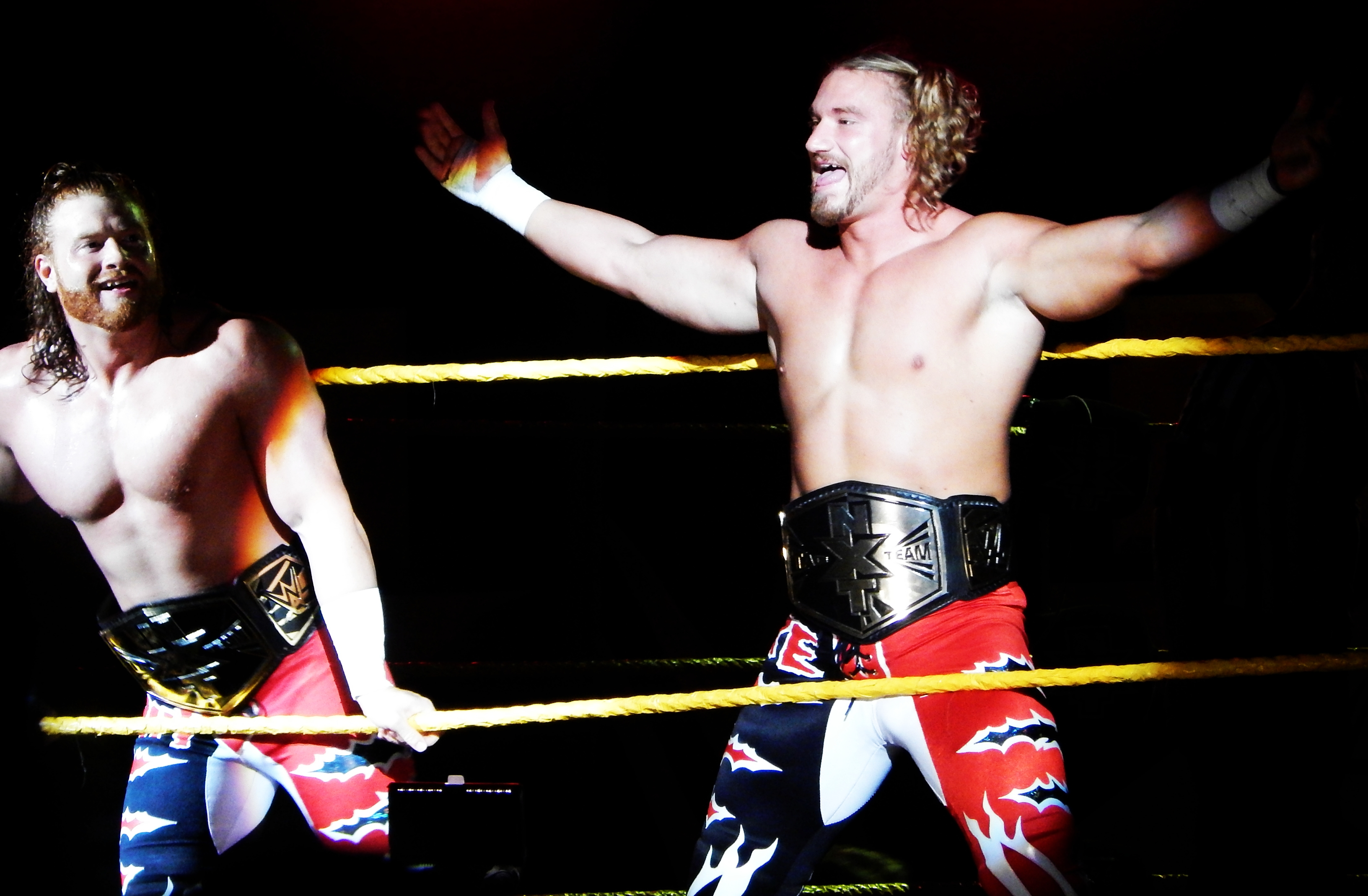
One-time champions Blake and Murphy (right and left), shown here with the original NXT Tag Team Championship belts

The original NXT Tag Team Championship belts featured a simple design. The center plate was an irregular polygon. Prominently down the center of the plate was a vertical NXT logo in gold; to the left center side of the logo read "Tag" while the right center side read "Team". The two side plates contained the WWE logo. The plates were on a black leather strap. A unique feature of this original design was that the two belts were slightly different. On one belt, the left side of the center plate was black with "Tag" written in gold while the right side of the center plate was gold with "Team" written in black; the other belt was the opposite. The side plates also reflected this coloring; the side plate on the black side was dominated by a black background behind the WWE logo while the side plate on the gold side had a dominant gold background behind the WWE logo. When first introduced, the side plates had the WWE scratch logo but in August 2014, all of WWE's pre-existing championships at the time received a minor update, changing the scratch logo to WWE's current logo that was originally used for the WWE Network that launched earlier that year in February.

On April 1, 2017, at WrestleMania Axxess, NXT General Manager William Regal announced that all of the NXT title belts would be redesigned. The new title belts were unveiled at TakeOver: Orlando that same night and given to the winners of their respective matches. Both the center plate and side plates of the new NXT Tag Team Championship belts are the same shape as the previous design and are again on black leather straps. The differences are the design on the plates themselves. The center plate maintains the vertical NXT logo prominently in the center, but now in silver with the WWE logo affixed at the very center of the "X". At the top of the plate right above the vertical NXT logo is a banner that reads "Tag Team", while at the bottom of the plate below the logo is a banner that reads "Champions". Black, silver, and gold ornamentation fills in the rest of the plate. Unlike the previous design, the design does not differentiate between the two championships. Coming in line with WWE's other championship belts, the updated design features side plates with a removable center section that can be customized with the champion's logo; the default side plates feature the WWE logo. As a result, the championship was the first WWE tag team championship to feature customizable side plates.

== Reigns ==
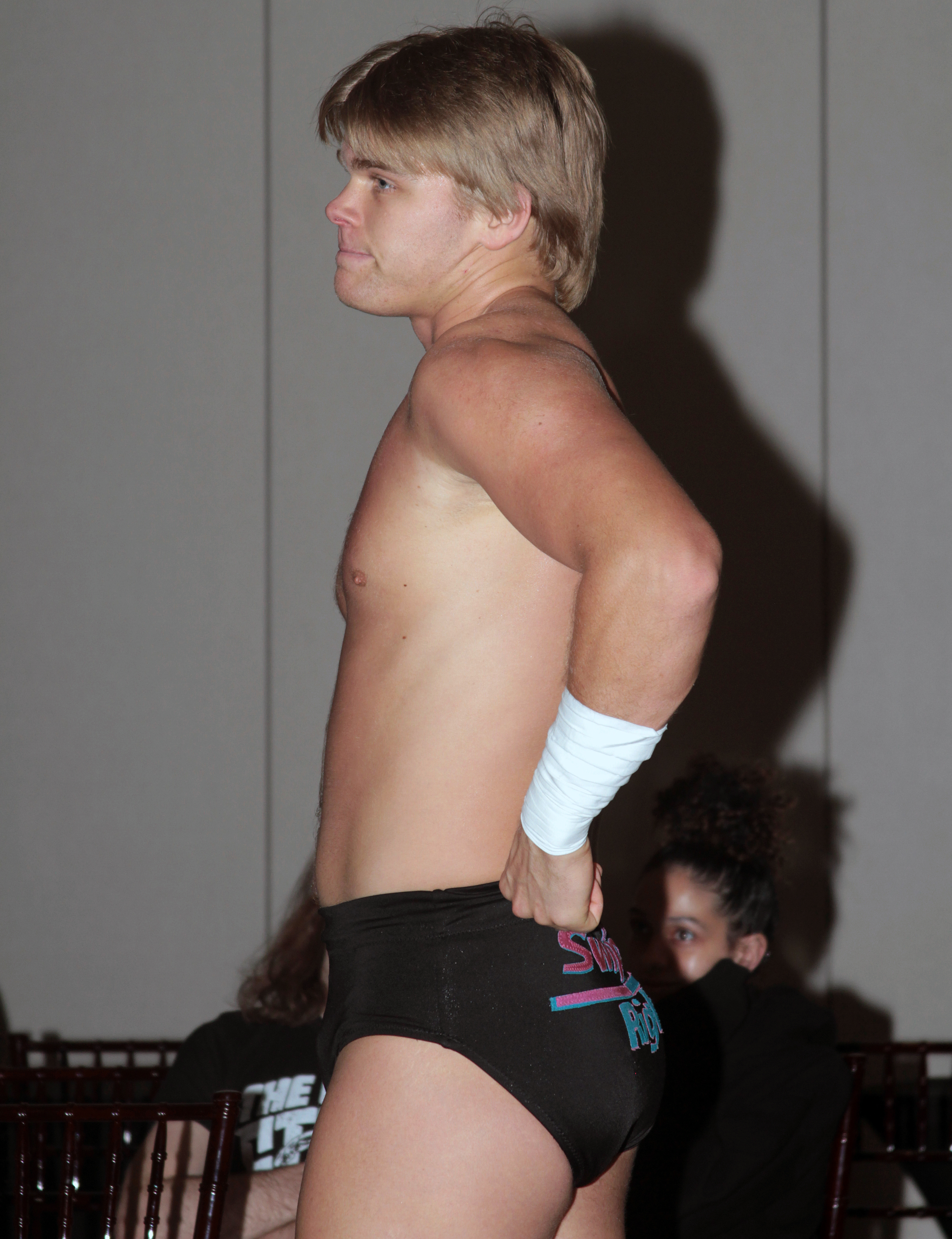
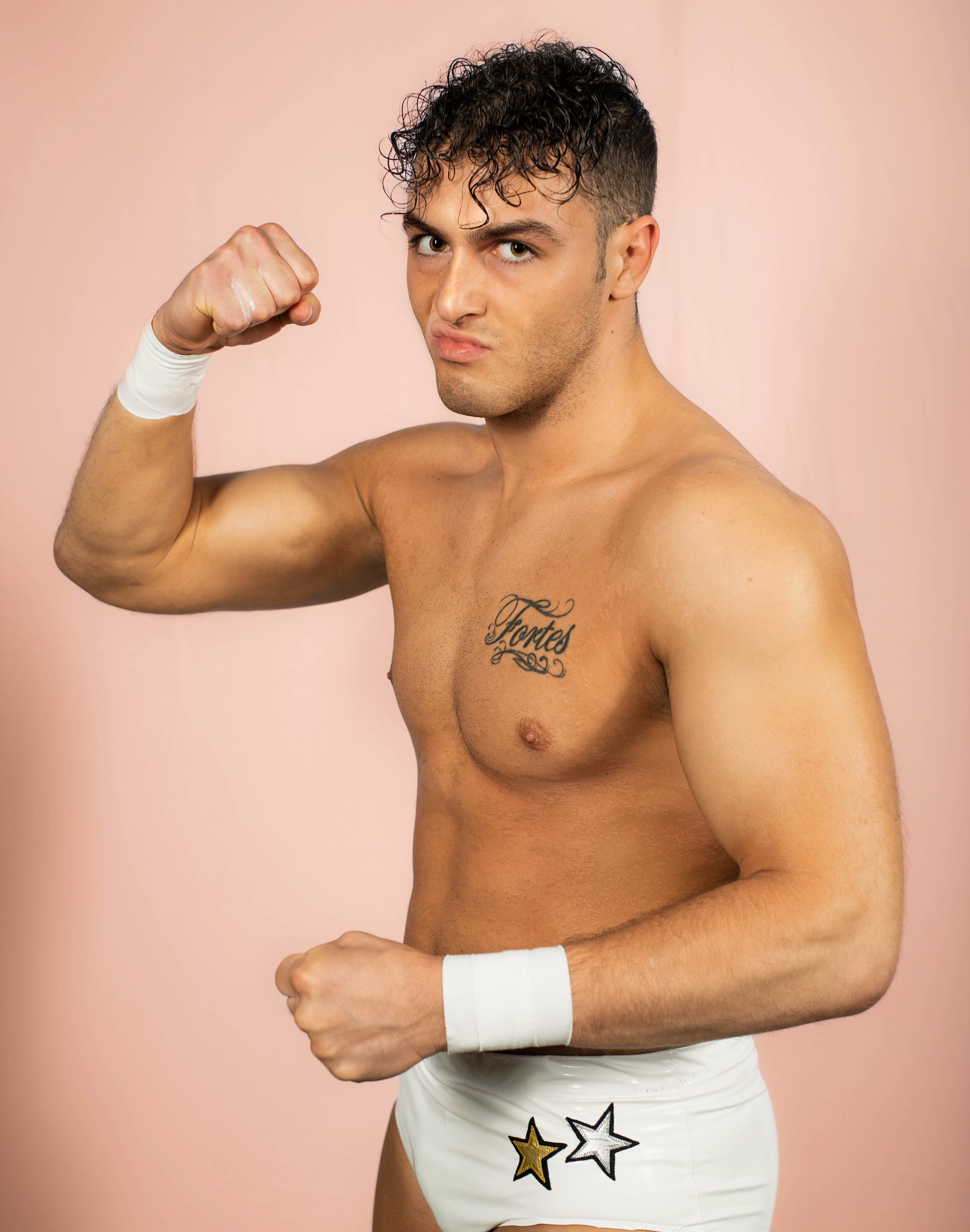
Current and two-time champions The Vanity Project (Brad Baylor and Ricky Smokes)

As of August 31, 2026, there have been 45 reigns between 35 teams composed of 71 individual champions, and three vacancies. The Undisputed Era as a stable have the most reigns at three, while individually, stable member Kyle O'Reilly has the most reigns, also at three. The inaugural champions were the British Ambition (Adrian Neville and Oliver Grey). The team with the longest reign is The Ascension (Conor O'Brian/Konnor and Rick Victor/Viktor), who held the title for 364 days, while the shortest reign belongs to Moustache Mountain (Tyler Bate and Trent Seven), who held the title for 2 days. However, due to tape delay, which are the air dates that WWE recognizes for the NXT Tag Team Championship's history, The Ascension's reign is regarded as lasting 343 days (still the longest) and that Moustache Mountain's reign was 22 days; as a result, MSK's (Nash Carter and Wes Lee) second reign of 6 days (5 days according to WWE) is recognized as the shortest. Tyler Bate is the youngest champion at 21, while Matt Hardy is the oldest at 51.

The Vanity Project (Brad Baylor and Ricky Smokes) are the current champions in their second reign, both as a team and individually. They won the title by defeating Myles Borne and Tavion Heights at Heatwave on August 30, 2026, in Edinburg, Texas.

== See also ==
- Tag team championships in WWE
