= Street Profits =

Professional wrestling tag team

The Street Profits
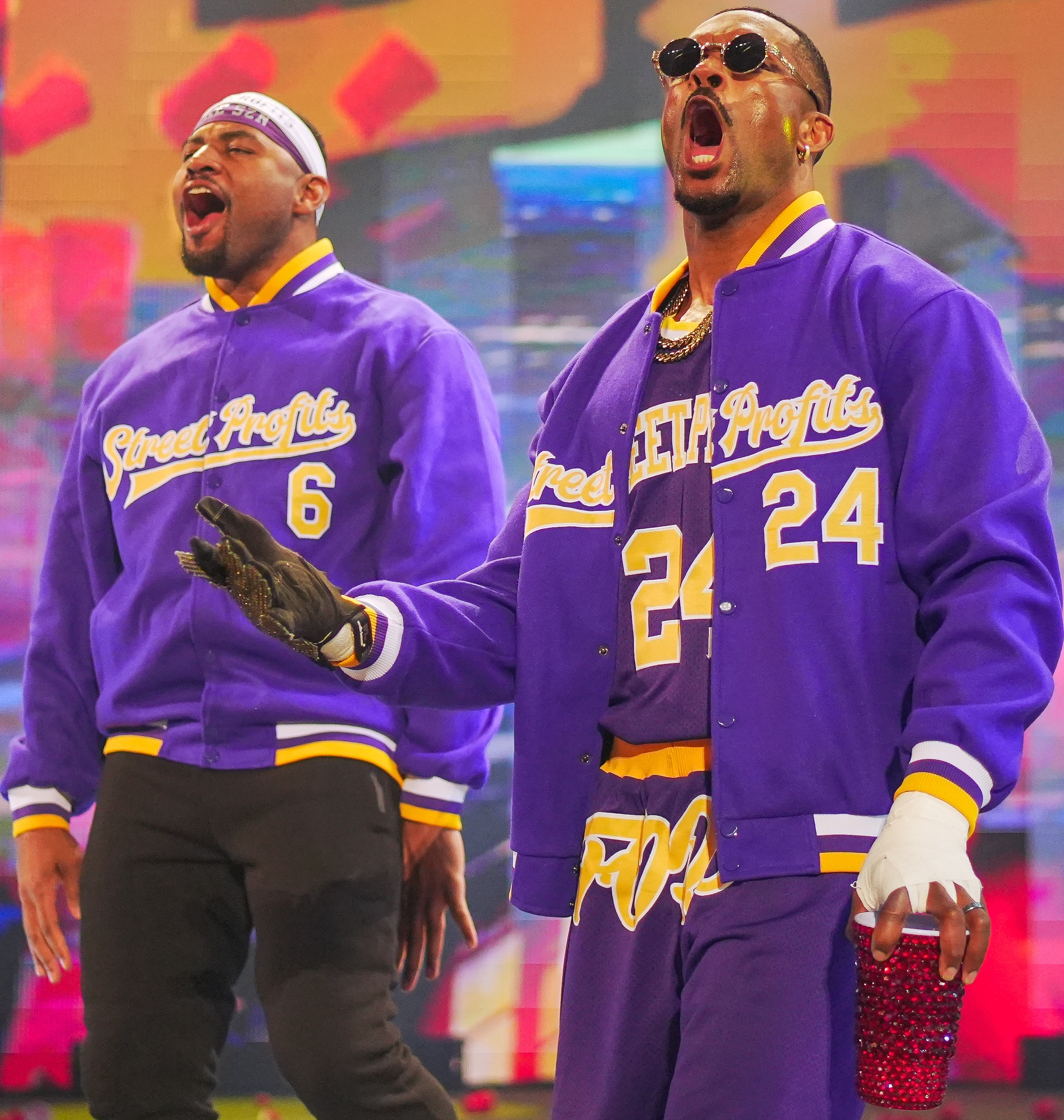
- The Street Profits (Montez Ford (right) and Angelo Dawkins (left)) in 2023.

Tag team
- Name(s): The Street Profits; Angelo Dawkins and Kenneth Crawford; Angelo Dawkins and Montez Ford
- Members: Angelo Dawkins; Montez Ford
- Billed heights: Dawkins: 6 ft 5 in (1.96 m); Ford: 6 ft 3 in (1.91 m)
- Combined billed weight: 492 lb (223 kg); Dawkins: 260 lbs (118 kg); Ford: 232 lb (105 kg)
- Debut: March 16, 2016
- Years active: 2016–present

The Street Profits are an American professional wrestling tag team consisting of Angelo Dawkins and Montez Ford. They are signed to WWE and perform on the Raw brand.

They are four-time world tag team champions in WWE as part of the main roster, having held the WWE Tag Team Championship and the World Tag Team Championship twice each. They also held the NXT Tag Team Championship once during their time in WWE's developmental brand, NXT, thus making them one of four teams to have accomplished the WWE Tag Team Triple Crown (alongside The Revival, The New Day, and The Hardy Boyz) while being the fastest to do so in 499 days.

== History ==
=== WWE (2016–present) ===
==== Debut and NXT Tag Team Champions (2016–2019) ====
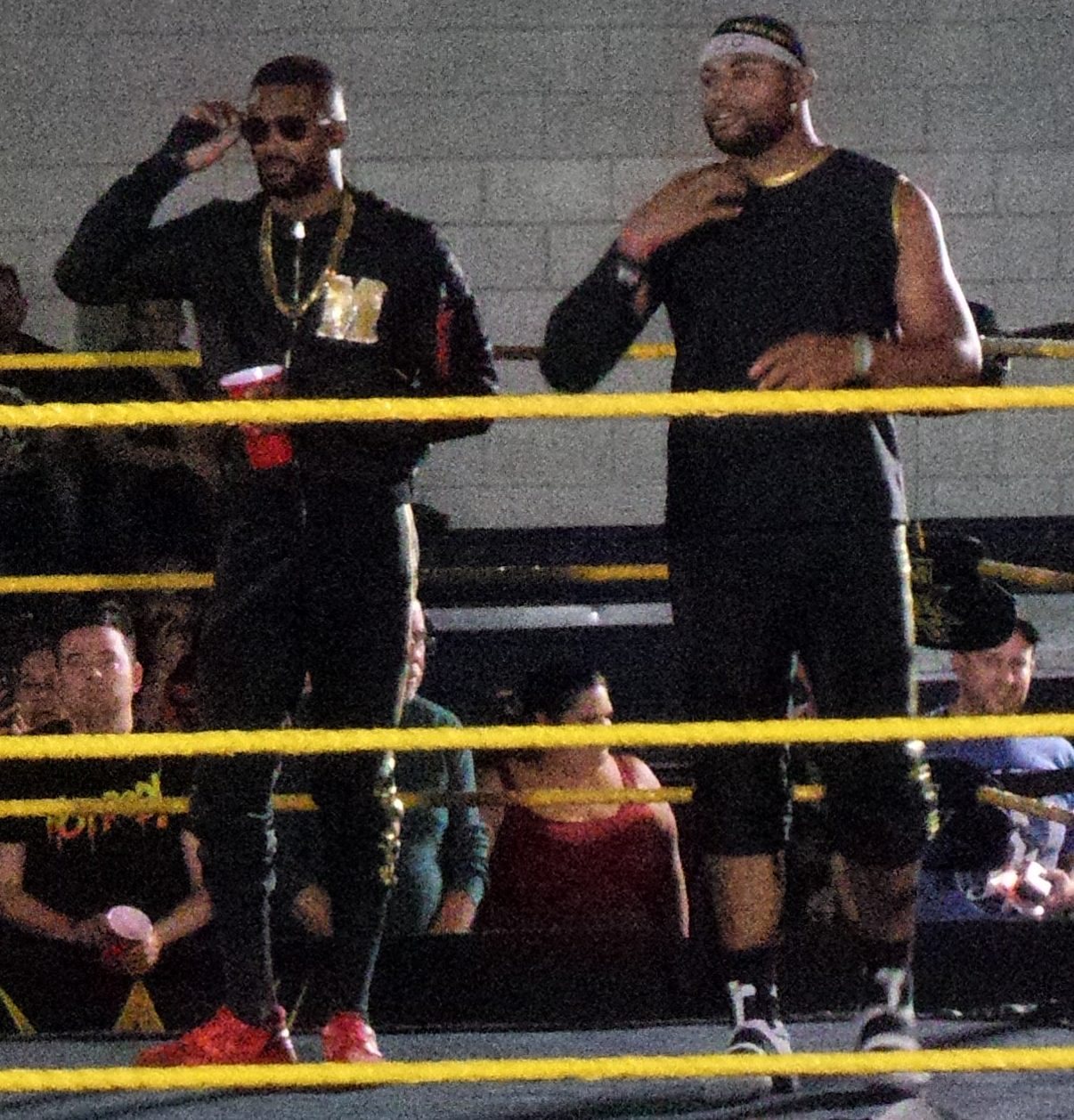
The Street Profits (Angelo Dawkins (right) and Montez Ford (left)) at an NXT event in 2017.

Gary Gordon and Kenneth Crawford signed a contract with WWE in 2012 and 2015 respectively. Gordon, under the ring name Angelo Dawkins, initially was the hype man for Sasha Banks, later becoming a part of a tag team in the NXT brand for two years alongside Sawyer Fulton. The team of Dawkins and Crawford debuted on the March 16, 2016 episode of NXT (taped on January 21), where they lost to The Hype Bros (Zack Ryder and Mojo Rawley); this marked Crawford's in-ring debut.

On the July 12, 2017 episode of NXT, Dawkins and Crawford (now renamed Montez Ford) started appearing in weekly vignettes as The Street Profits. They made their return on the August 9 episode of NXT as fan favorites, defeating the Metro Brothers. The Street Profits would go on a winning streak, defeating the likes of The Ealy Brothers, Riddick Moss and Tino Sabbatelli, and local wrestlers. On the January 17, 2018 episode of NXT, The Street Profits suffered their first loss to The Authors of Pain (Akam and Rezar), failing to earn a NXT Tag Team Championship match at NXT TakeOver: Philadelphia on January 27. Later on, they entered the Dusty Rhodes Tag Team Classic, where they defeated Heavy Machinery (Otis Dozovic and Tucker Knight) in the first round, but were eliminated by AOP in the semifinals.

On the May 1, 2019 episode of NXT, The Viking Raiders (Erik and Ivar) vacated the NXT Tag Team Championship, but were immediately challenged by The Street Profits. The match ended in a disqualification after Oney Lorcan and Danny Burch, and The Forgotten Sons (Jaxson Ryker, Steve Cutler, and Wesley Blake) got involved. A four-way tag team ladder match for the NXT Tag Team Championship was scheduled for NXT TakeOver: XXV between The Street Profits, Lorcan and Burch, The Forgotten Sons, and The Undisputed Era (Kyle O'Reilly and Bobby Fish). At NXT TakeOver: XXV on June 1, they won the NXT Tag Team Championship for the first time. On the July 10 episode of NXT, The Street Profits retained the titles against Lorcan and Burch, but on the August 15 tapings of NXT, they lost the NXT Tag Team Championship to O'Reilly and Fish. During this time, they started appearing on Raw in various backstage segments, a move that was said to be done in order to appeal to younger audiences. It was clarified by Dave Meltzer that the team were still NXT wrestlers and that this was not an official move to Raw.

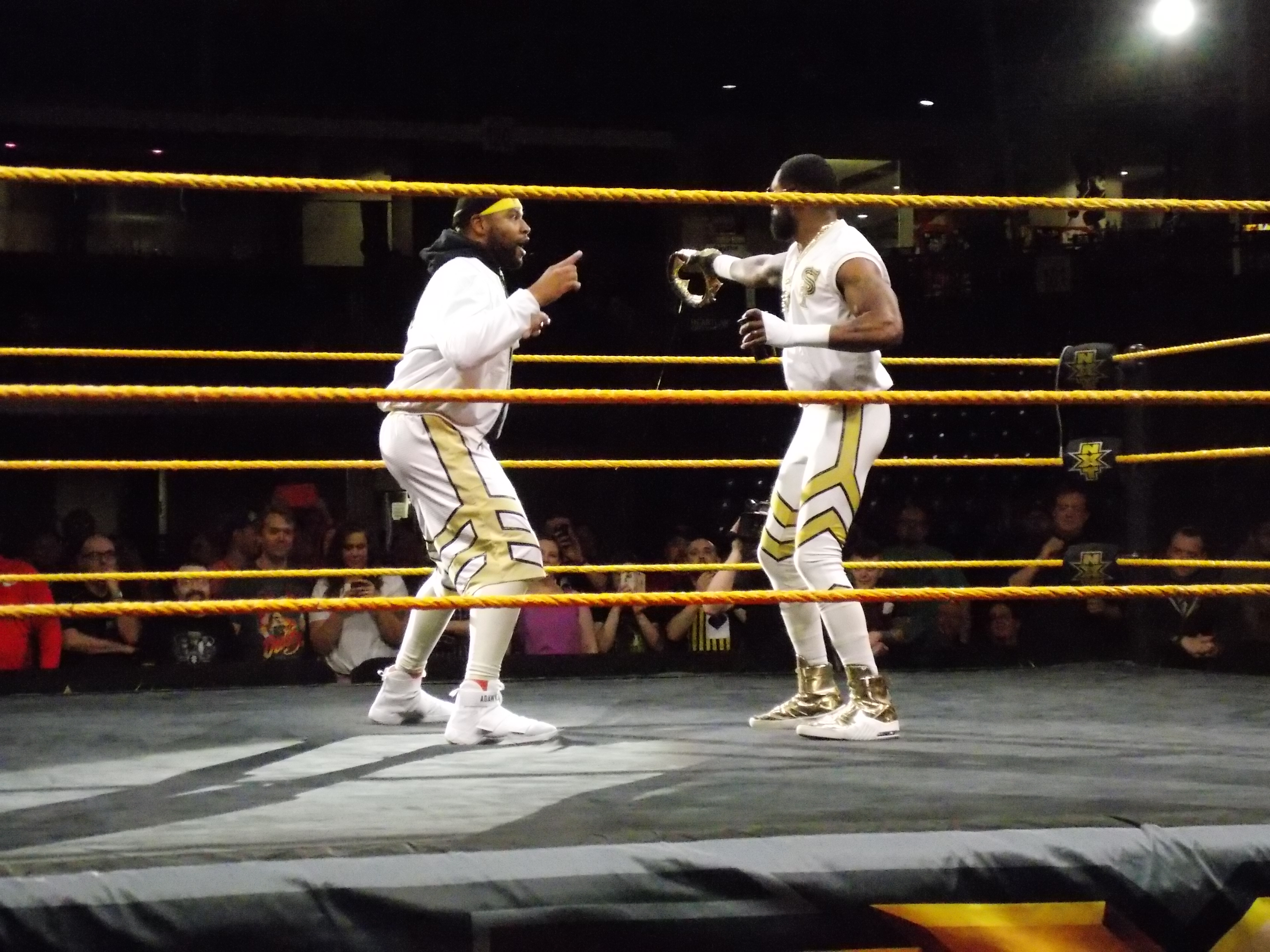
The Street Profits (Angelo Dawkins (left) and Montez Ford (right)) at an NXT event in April 2019

==== Raw Tag Team Champions (2019–2020) ====
As part of the 2019 Draft in October, the Street Profits were drafted to the Raw brand, formally bringing them to the show. On the October 21 episode of Raw, the Street Profits defeated Luke Gallows and Karl Anderson in their debut match. At Survivor Series on November 24, the Street Profits competed in a 10-team Interbrand Tag Team Battle Royal where they were the last team eliminated by the eventual winners, Dolph Ziggler and Robert Roode. The team would hardly wrestle on Raw during their first few months on the main roster but mostly spent time backstage hyping up the shows. This was being done because Paul Heyman (who was executive director of Raw at the time) wanted to get their personalities out more to help them get more over with the fans, in front of a wider audience which ended up working for all parties involved later on.

On the December 9 episode of Raw, the Street Profits answered an open challenge for a title bout issued by Raw Tag Team Champions The Viking Raiders, where The Viking Raiders retained. Four weeks later, the Street Profits were given another shot at the Viking Raiders' tag team titles, this time in a triple threat match that also involved Gallows and Anderson where The Viking Raiders retained once again. On the February 17, 2020 episode of Raw, after Kevin Owens and The Viking Raiders defeated Murphy and AOP via disqualification due to Seth Rollins' interference, the Street Profits came out and aided Owens and The Viking Raiders by attacking Murphy and AOP while Rollins retreated. Later, the Street Profits were scheduled to challenge Rollins and Murphy for the Raw Tag Team Championship at Super ShowDown on February 27, where they would be unsuccessful.

On the March 2 episode of Raw, the Street Profits were given a final opportunity "Last Chance Match" rematch, and with the help of Kevin Owens, they won the Raw Tag Team Championship. Later backstage, Rollins and Murphy challenged them to a rematch for the titles at Elimination Chamber on March 8, where the Street Profits retained the titles. They retained their titles again by defeating Angel Garza and Austin Theory on the second night of WrestleMania 36 on April 5. In the following weeks, the Street Profits feuded with The Viking Raiders as they faced each other in several competitions such as a game of basketball, axe-throwing, golf, bowling, and a decathlon which was later dubbed as the "Anything You Can Do, We Can Do Better" series. The series would end with a 3–3 tie between the Street Profits and The Viking Raiders. At Backlash on June 14, they were set to face the Viking Raiders, but the match did not start due to them brawling outside the building, being accosted by Akira Tozawa and a group of ninjas, and ending up in a dumpster. On the June 22 episode of Raw, The Street Profits retained the titles against The Viking Raiders, thus ending the feud. They then defended their titles against Andrade and Angel Garza successfully at SummerSlam on August 23 and at Clash of Champions on September 27.

==== SmackDown Tag Team Champions (2020–2021) ====
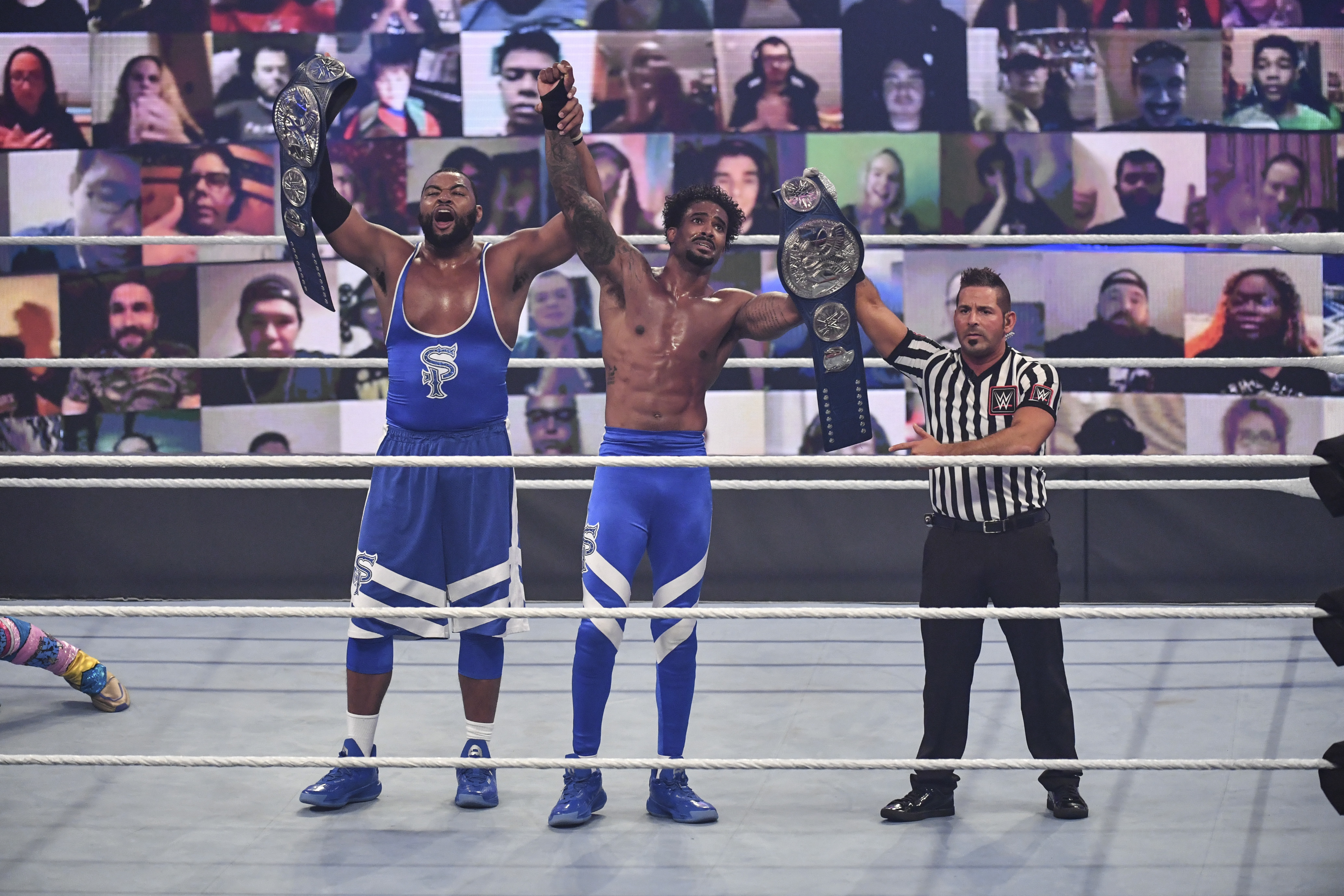
The Street Profits as SmackDown Tag Team Champions in November 2020

As part of the 2020 Draft in October, Dawkins and Ford were drafted to the SmackDown brand. They would then trade the Raw Tag Team Championship to The New Day (Kofi Kingston and Xavier Woods) - who had just been drafted to the Raw brand - in exchange for the latter team's SmackDown Tag Team Championship. This would make the Street Profits the second team to acquire the WWE Tag Team Triple Crown.

Upon moving to SmackDown, they began a feud with the team of Dolph Ziggler and Robert Roode. On the December 18 episode of SmackDown, the Street Profits successfully defended the titles against Roode and Ziggler. On the January 8, 2021 episode of SmackDown, Ziggler and Roode defeated the Street Profits to win the SmackDown Tag Team Championship, ending their reign at a recorded 88 days. On the April 1 episode of SmackDown, they failed to regain the titles in a fatal four-way match also involving The Mysterios (composed of Rey and Dominik Mysterio) and Chad Gable and Otis. On the June 11 episode of SmackDown, Ford suffered a partial rib fracture from Otis; the injury put Ford out of action for months. In September, The Street Profits began a feud with SmackDown Tag Team Champions The Usos, leading to a match between the two teams at Extreme Rules on September 26, in which The Usos retained their titles. On the October 15 episode of SmackDown, The Street Profits failed to win the titles against the Usos in a Street Fight.

==== Championship pursuits (2021–2023) ====
As part of the 2021 Draft, The Street Profits were drafted back to the Raw brand. At Day 1 on January 1, 2022, they faced RK-Bro (Randy Orton and Riddle) for the Raw Tag Team Championship, but lost. At the Royal Rumble pay-per-view, on January 29, Ford and Dawkins entered the Royal Rumble match at #6 and #10, respectively, but would both go on to lose. On the second night of WrestleMania 38, on April 3, they once again failed to win the titles in a triple threat match also involving Alpha Academy (Chad Gable and Otis). At Money in the Bank on July 2, The Street Profits failed to win the Undisputed WWE Tag Team Championship from The Usos, as well as in a rematch at SummerSlam on July 30 with Jeff Jarrett as the special guest referee. At Clash at the Castle on September 3, The Street Profits teamed with Madcap Moss to defeat Alpha Academy and Austin Theory during the pre-show.

At the Royal Rumble pay-per-view, on January 28, 2023, The Street Profits entered the men's Royal Rumble match with Dawkins entering at number 11 and Ford at number 23, but were unsuccessful as Dawkins was eliminated by Brock Lesnar, while Ford was eliminated by Damian Priest. On the February 6 episode of Raw, Ford defeated Elias to qualify for the Elimination Chamber match for the United States Championship, while Dawkins lost to Damian Priest in another qualifying match. At the Elimination Chamber pay-per-view, Ford failed to win the title. On Night 1 of WrestleMania 39, The Street Profits won the men's WrestleMania Showcase fatal four-way tag team match. As part of the 2023 draft, The Street Profits were drafted back to the SmackDown brand.

==== The Pride (2023–2024) ====
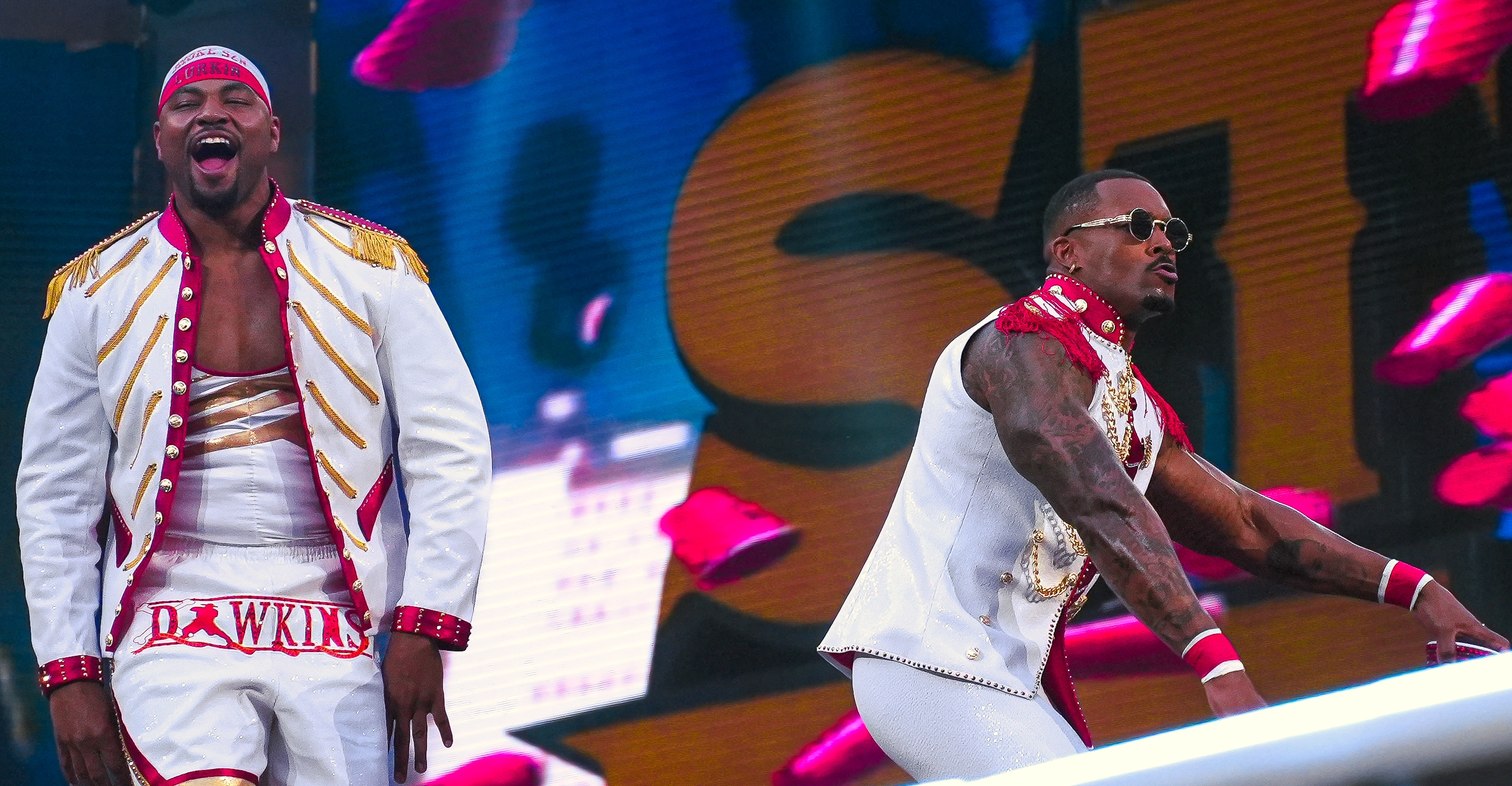
The Street Profits at WrestleMania 39.

On the July 14 episode of SmackDown, a returning Bobby Lashley appeared in a backstage segment with The Street Profits to recruit them to form an alliance. On the August 4 episode of SmackDown, The Street Profits interrupted a tag team match between Luke Gallows and Karl Anderson and The Brawling Brutes' Butch and Ridge Holland by taking out the participants in the match, turning heel for the first time on the main roster. The Street Profits then stood on the ramp with Lashley to celebrate the beatdown. The Street Profits and Lashley teamed up for a match for the first time to face the Latino World Order (LWO) in a six-man tag team match at Fastlane. A day before the event on SmackDown, the trio took out the LWO's Cruz Del Toro and Joaquin Wilde to leave the LWO a man short for the match. At the event, a returning Carlito teamed up with Rey Mysterio and Santos Escobar for the LWO to win the match. On the November 24 episode of SmackDown, The Street Profits failed to win the Undisputed WWE Tag Team Championship from The Judgment Day (Finn Bálor and Damian Priest) after interference from Rhea Ripley, turning face once again. The Street Profits, Lashley and B-Fab would call themselves as The Pride. At SmackDown: New Year's Revolution, The Street Profits as part of The Pride cemented their face turn after Lashley was attacked by The Final Testament (Karrion Kross and the returning Authors of Pain), and starting a feud in the process.

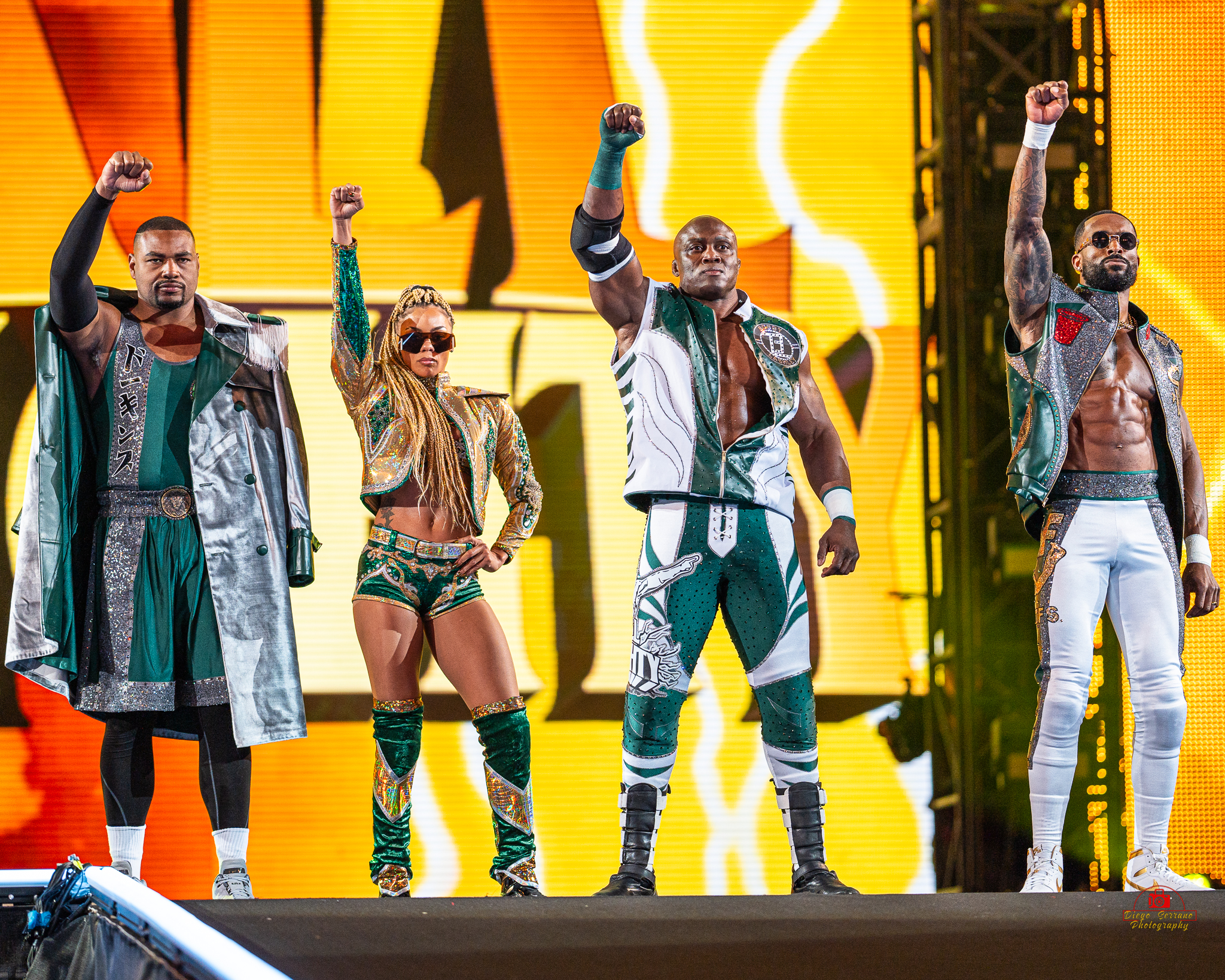
The Street Profits along with Bobby Lashley and B-Fab as The Pride at WrestleMania XL.

On Night 2 of WrestleMania XL on April 7, The Pride defeated The Final Testament in a Philadelphia Street Fight, thus ending the feud. On the April 19 episode of SmackDown, Street Profits won a fatal-four way tag team match to face A-Town Down Under (Austin Theory and Grayson Waller) for the newly renamed WWE Tag Team Championship but they failed to win the titles two weeks later. Lashley was inserted into the King of the Ring tournament but was later pulled out due to injury and was replaced by Dawkins. On the May 10 episode of SmackDown, Dawkins lost the first round qualifiers to The Bloodline's Tama Tonga. On August 16, The Pride quietly disbanded due to Lashley leaving WWE, although Street Profits and B-Fab would continue their alliance without any mention of The Pride as a stable.

==== WWE Tag Team Champions (2024–2025) ====
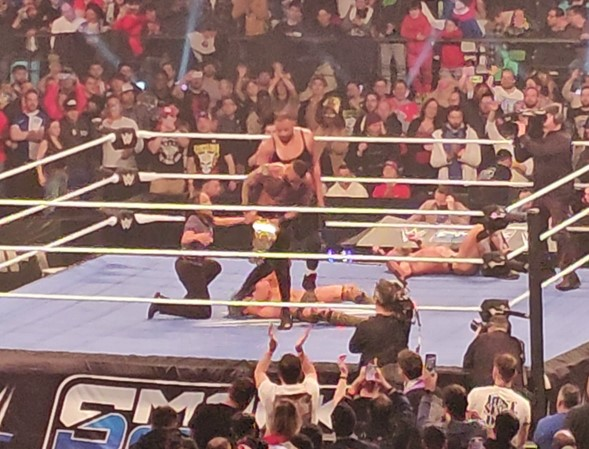
Streets Profits after they won the WWE Tag Team Championships in Barcelona, Spain.

On the November 15 episode of SmackDown, Street Profits challenged Motor City Machine Guns (Alex Shelley and Chris Sabin) for the WWE Tag Team Championship, but the match ended in a no contest after #DIY's Tommaso Ciampa attacked both teams, after the match, Angelo Dawkins attacked Alex Shelly leaving alongside Montez Ford, both of them teasing a heel turn in the process. Over the next few weeks, Motor City Machine Guns entered into a feud with #DIY (Ciampa and Johnny Gargano), and at the Royal Rumble in February, the Street Profits (without B-Fab) cost Motor City Machine Guns their opportunity at regaining th titles by attacking them and allowing #DIY to retain the titles, turning heel in the process. They also attacked DIY during their celebration after the match. On the February 7, 2025 episode of SmackDown, during an interview, The Street Profits made a statement explaining their actions at the Royal Rumble and putting the entire SmackDown Tag Team division on notice saying that they are after gold. On the February 21, 2025 episode of SmackDown! The Street Profits interfered with a WWE Tag Team Championship match between #DIY and Pretty Deadly having it end in a no contest, The Motor City Machine Guns also came down to prevent the attack but to no avail as they were also dominated by The Street Profits.

On the March 14 episode of SmackDown, they defeated #DIY to win the WWE Tag Team Championship for the second time. On the April 25 episode of SmackDown, they successfully defended the titles against #DIY and Motor City Machine Guns in a tables, ladders, and chairs match.

On the July 11, 2025 episode of SmackDown! The Street Profits lost the Tag Team titles to The Wyatt Sick6 (Dexter Lumis and Joe Gacy) ending their reign at 119 days. The Profits would receive several rematches with the Wyatt cohort, losing to them on August 31, 2025 at the Clash in Paris PLE and again on October 10 on SmackDown.

==== World Tag Team Champions (2026–present) ====
On the April 20, 2026 episode of Raw, the Street Profits returned from a hiatus to attack The Vision and back up Seth Rollins who was being beat down by Bron Breakker. At Saturday Night's Main Event XLIV on May 23, The Street Profits failed to win the World Tag Team Championship from Austin Theory and Logan Paul after interference from Breakker and Paul Heyman. On the June 22 episode of Raw, The Street Profits defeated Breakker and Theory to win the World Tag Team Championships after interference from Joe Hendry and Rollins. On the July 6 episode of Raw, The Street Profits lost the titles back to Breakker and Theory after interference from Maxxine Dupri, ending their second reign at 14 days.

=== Evolve (2018–2019) ===
On October 28, 2018, the Street Profits made their first appearance at Evolve 114, winning the Evolve Tag Team Championship by defeating the Doom Patrol (Chris Dickinson and Jaka). They would successfully defend the titles against the likes of the WorkHorsemen, AR Fox and Leon Ruff, Austin Theory and Harlem Bravado, and the Skulk. At Evolve 123, they lost the titles to the Unwanted. On March 16, 2019, they made their final Evolve appearance as a tag team at Evolve 124, teaming with Velveteen Dream to defeat the Unwanted in a six-man tag team match.

== Other media ==
The Street Profits made their video game debut as playable characters in WWE 2K19 and have since appeared in WWE 2K20, WWE 2K22, WWE 2K23, WWE 2K24, WWE 2K25 and WWE 2K26.

== Controversy ==
In October 2026, it was reported that Ford, WWE, and WWE subsidiary Event Services, LLC were being sued by a security officer who worked on a Raw episode in July. Off-duty Cook County Sheriff officer Noel Lucas is suing for 14 counts including assault, battery, intentional infliction of emotional distress, and violations of the Illinois Gender Violence Act for Ford performing an unwanted sexualized "lap dance" during the Street Profits's entrance in a live Netflix broadcast that was promoted on social media by WWE. Lucas alleged that he has suffered humiliation, embarrassment, and emotional distress, and that his children were mocked and ridiculed over the incident.

== Championships and accomplishments ==
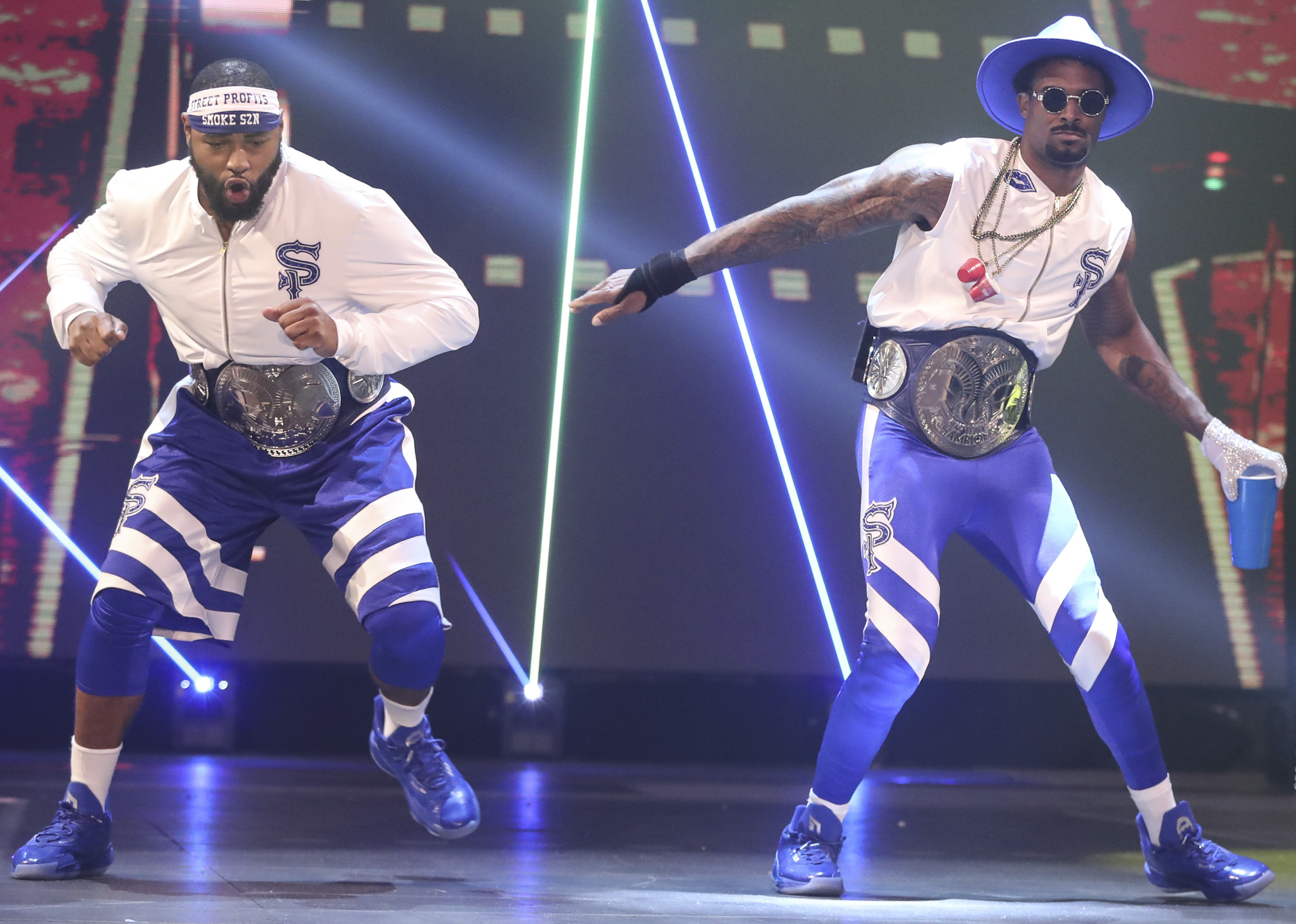
The Street Profits are two-time WWE Tag Team Champions. They are also two-time World Tag Team Champions.

- Pro Wrestling Illustrated
  - Ranked No. 5 of the top 50 Tag Teams in the PWI Tag Team 50 in 2020
- Evolve
  - Evolve Tag Team Championship (1 time)
- WWE
  - NXT Tag Team Championship (1 time)
  - World Tag Team Championship (2 times)
  - WWE Tag Team Championship (2 times)
  - Second WWE Tag Team Triple Crown Champions
  - WWE Year-End Award for Breakthrough Superstars of the Year (2019)
  - RK-Bro-nament (2021)
  - Slammy Award (2 times)
    - Tag Team of the Year (2020)
    - Breakout Star of the Year (2020)
