= PLE =

PLE may refer to:

- Photoluminescence excitation
- Pig-liver esterase
- Pittsburgh and Lake Erie Railroad, P&LE
- Polymorphous light eruption, a skin condition caused by sunlight
- Public legal education
- Protein losing enteropathy
- Primary Leaving Examinations, in education in Uganda
- State of Palestine, IOC country code
- Pollokshields East railway station, Glasgow, Scotland, National Rail station code

== See also ==
- Plé, a surname
