= Riddick Moss =

American professional wrestler (born 1989)

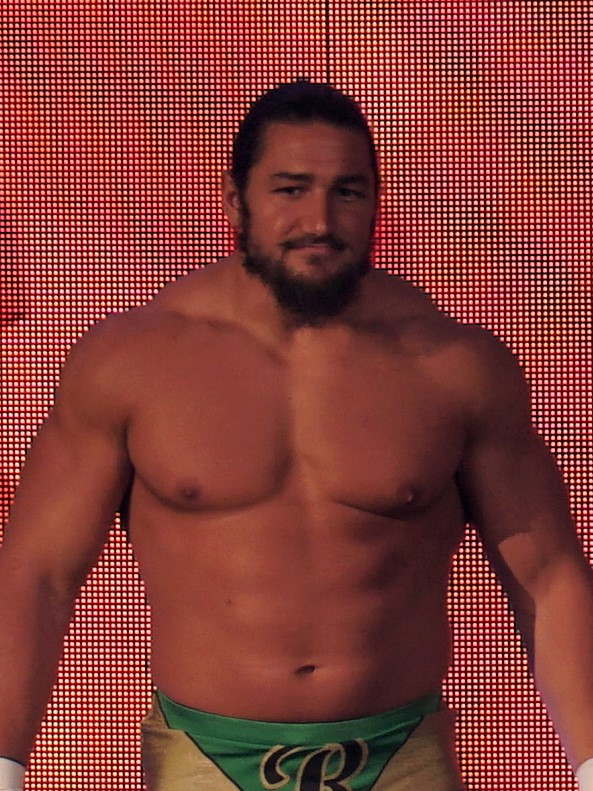
- Moss in 2018

Personal information
- Born: Michael Carter Rallis; October 10, 1989 (age 37) Edina, Minnesota, U.S.
- Spouse: Tenille Dashwood (m. 2024)
- Children: 2

Professional wrestling career
- Ring name(s): Digg Rawlis; Michael Carter; Mike Rawlis; Mike Rallis; Madcap Moss; Riddick Moss
- Billed height: 6 ft 3 in (1.91 m)
- Billed weight: 245 lb (111 kg)
- Billed from: Minneapolis, Minnesota
- Trained by: WWE Performance Center
- Debut: December 18, 2014

Michael Carter Rallis (born October 10, 1989) is an American professional wrestler and former college football player. He currently performs on the independent circuit under his real name. Rallis is best known for his tenure in WWE under the ring names Riddick Moss and Madcap Moss, where he is a former WWE 24/7 Champion, and won the André the Giant Memorial Battle Royal in 2022.

== Early life ==
Rallis was born and raised in Edina, Minnesota. He attended the University of Minnesota, where he played for the Minnesota Golden Gophers football team between 2008 and 2012. He played outside linebacker for the Golden Gophers and finished third on the team in tackles during his junior year. After graduation, he attended a tryout camp with the Miami Dolphins but was not signed to a contract. In October 2013, Rallis attended a WWE tryout after contacting Jim Ross.

== Professional wrestling career ==
=== WWE ===
==== NXT (2014–2019) ====
Rallis signed a developmental contract with WWE in early 2014 and began training at the WWE Performance Center. He made his professional wrestling debut on December 18 at a NXT live event in Tampa, Florida under the ring name Digg Rawlis. He made his televised debut on the May 27, 2015, episode of NXT, working as an enhancement talent alongside Elias Samson in a defeat to Blake and Murphy. Rawlis made further occasional televised appearances as an enhancement talent during 2015, losing to the Hype Bros and Samoa Joe. In August 2015, he adopted the new ring name Riddick Moss, a tribute to former NFL player Randy Moss.

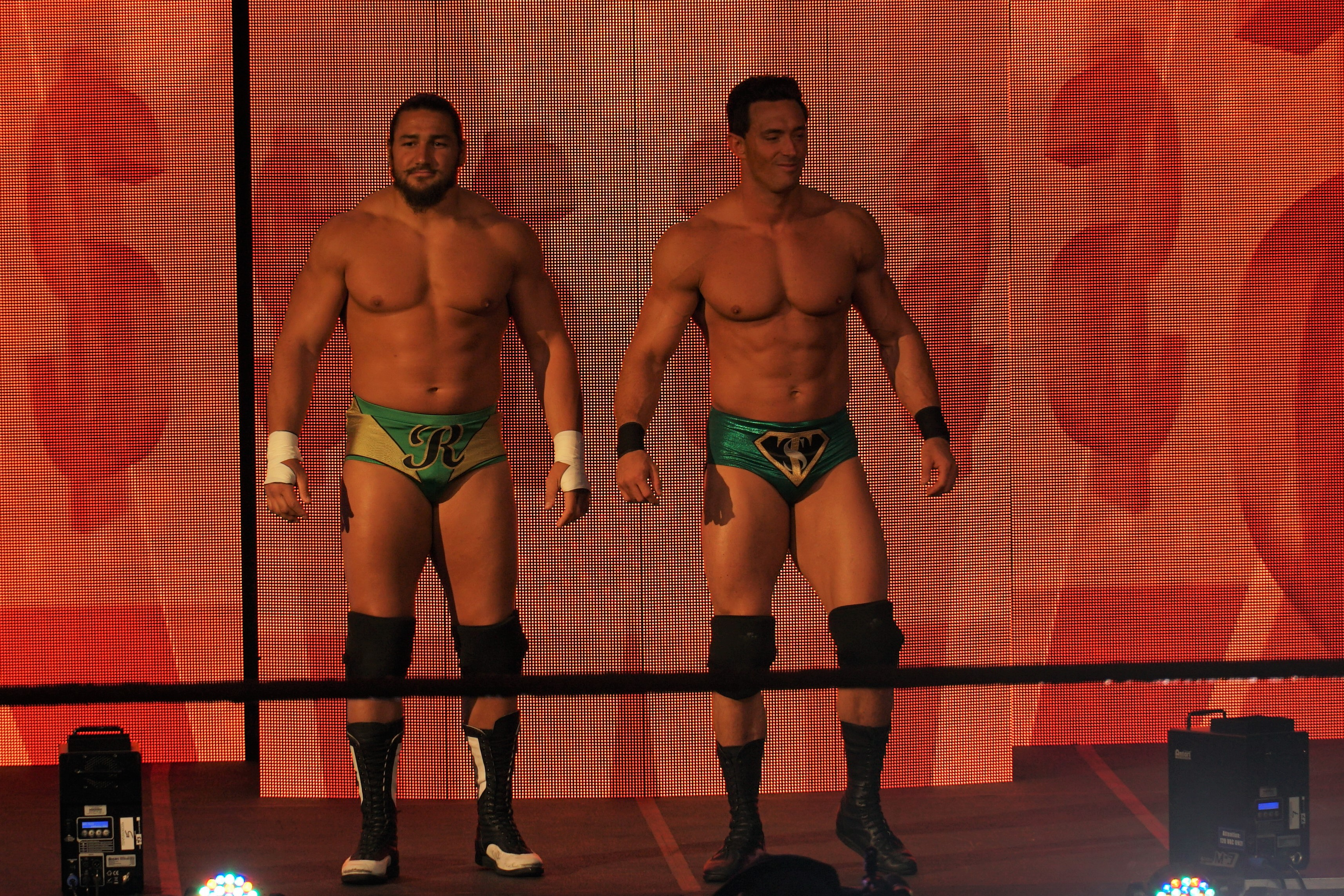
Moss and Tino Sabbatelli in 2018

In October 2016, Moss began teaming with Tino Sabbatelli as the God Gifted Athletes; the two competed in the 2016 Dusty Rhodes Tag Team Classic, where they lost in the first round to TM61 on the October 12 episode of NXT. Moss made a further appearance on the January 4, 2017, episode of NXT, again teaming with Sabbatelli and losing to The Revival (Dash Wilder and Scott Dawson). The duo had their first televised victory on the October 25 episode of NXT, defeating Oney Lorcan and Danny Burch; they began performing as heels during this time. In early 2018, Moss and Sabbatelli entered the Dusty Rhodes Tag Team Classic, losing to Sanity in the first round. On the April 25 episode of NXT, during a match with Heavy Machinery, Sabbatelli ditched Moss, thus ending their alliance. In May, he tore his Achilles tendon, which would require several months to recuperate. Moss returned from injury at a live event on November 30, losing to Matt Riddle after a surprise appearance. In March 2019, he started being managed by Robert Strauss at live events.

==== 24/7 Champion and alliance with Happy Corbin (2020–2022) ====
On the January 27, 2020 episode of Raw, Moss made his main roster debut, accompanying Mojo Rawley to the ring for his WWE 24/7 Championship match against No Way Jose, where Moss was billed as Rawley's offensive lineman; Rawley lost the title to R-Truth right after defeating Jose, however, Moss assisted Rawley in regaining the title seconds later. On the February 10 episode of Raw, after they lost to the Street Profits, Moss turned on Rawley and pinned him to win the 24/7 Championship. Moss retained his title against the likes of Rawley, Truth, Cedric Alexander, and Ricochet. On the March 23 episode of Raw, Moss lost the title to Truth while out for a jog, ending his reign at 41 days. On the August 10 episode of Raw, Moss returned in a Raw Underground segment, an underground fight club hosted by Shane McMahon, defeating Cal Bloom by knockout. In October, Moss revealed he had been performing with a torn ACL two months prior.

After a year out of action, in a dark match before the September 17, 2021 episode of SmackDown, Moss returned from injury by defeating Odyssey Jones. The following week on SmackDown, Moss made his televised return, attacking Kevin Owens and aligning with Happy Corbin. The following week, his ring name was changed to Madcap Moss and he began adopting a comic persona. They entered into a feud with Drew McIntyre, mocking him and making jokes at his expense, leading to a match between the two at Day 1 on January 1, 2022, which Moss lost. Moss entered the Royal Rumble match at the namesake event on January 29, entering at #19 and eliminating AJ Styles, but was eliminated by McIntyre. At Elimination Chamber on February 19, Moss lost to McIntyre in a Falls Count Anywhere match. During the match, he took an inverted Alabama Slam, resulting in him landing directly on top of his head, but was able to continue the match. On the April 1 episode of SmackDown, Moss won the 2022 André the Giant Memorial Battle Royal, last eliminating Finn Bálor. On the first night of WrestleMania 38 on April 2, Moss accompanied Corbin to the ring for his match against McIntyre, which he lost.

==== Singles competition (2022–2023) ====
On the April 8 episode of SmackDown, Corbin blamed Moss for his loss against McIntyre and attacked him, ending their alliance and turning Moss face for the first time in his WWE career. At WrestleMania Backlash on May 8, Moss defeated Corbin. On the May 13 episode of SmackDown, Corbin attacked Moss with the André the Giant Memorial Battle Royal trophy and injured his neck, which left Moss having to be stretchered out of the arena. Moss returned on the June 3 episode of SmackDown with a more serious persona, new entrance music and in-ring attire. At Hell in a Cell on June 5, Moss defeated Corbin in a No Holds Barred match. On the June 17 episode of SmackDown, Moss defeated Corbin for a third time in a Last Laugh match to end their feud.

On the July 1 episode of SmackDown, Moss defeated Corbin, Ezekiel, and The Miz in a fatal four-way match to qualify for the Money in the Bank ladder match. At the eponymous event on July 2, he failed to win the match. On the August 19 episode of SmackDown, Moss competed in a fatal five way match to determine the #1 contender for the Intercontinental Championship, which was won by Sheamus. At the Clash at the Castle pre-show on September 3, Moss and the Street Profits defeated Alpha Academy (Chad Gable and Otis) and Austin Theory. On the September 16 episode of SmackDown, Moss challenged Solo Sikoa for the NXT North American Championship in a losing effort. On the February 10 episode of SmackDown, Moss defeated Karrion Kross, Santos Escobar, and Rey Mysterio, who Moss pinned, in a fatal four-way match to become the #1 contender for Gunther's Intercontinental Championship. The following week, Moss failed to win the title due to the fans starting to disrespect him during the match, turning tweener in the process. On the April 14 episode of SmackDown, after losing to Shinsuke Nakamura, Moss attempted to attack him but Nakamura fended off, fully reverting him into a heel. As part of the 2023 WWE Draft, Moss, now reverting back to Riddick Moss, was drafted to the Raw brand. On September 21, 2023, Moss was released from WWE along with a host of other superstars (including real-life partner Emma).

=== Independent circuit (2024–present) ===
Six months after his WWE release, Rallis made his debut on the independent circuit on April 13, 2024, where he faced Chris Masters for the Stu Hart Heritage Championship in a losing effort.

== Other media ==
Moss made his video game debut in WWE 2k23, he also appears in the mobile game WWE Supercard.

== Personal life ==
Rallis' brother, Nick, is the defensive coordinator for the Arizona Cardinals.

On August 4, 2022, Rallis revealed that he is dating Australian professional wrestler Tenille Dashwood. On June 3, 2023, Rallis and Dashwood announced their engagement on Instagram. The couple married on March 8, 2024. On September 6, 2024, Dashwood announced that she is expecting her first child with Rallis in 2025. Their son, Leo Austin, was born on March 4. In December 23, 2025, the couple announced that they expecting their second child. Their daughter was born in June 19, 2026.

== Championships and accomplishments ==
- Pro Wrestling Illustrated
  - Ranked No. 244 of the top 500 singles wrestlers in the PWI 500 in 2022
- WWE
  - WWE 24/7 Championship (1 time)
  - André the Giant Memorial Battle Royal (2022)
