= War Raiders =

Professional wrestling tag team

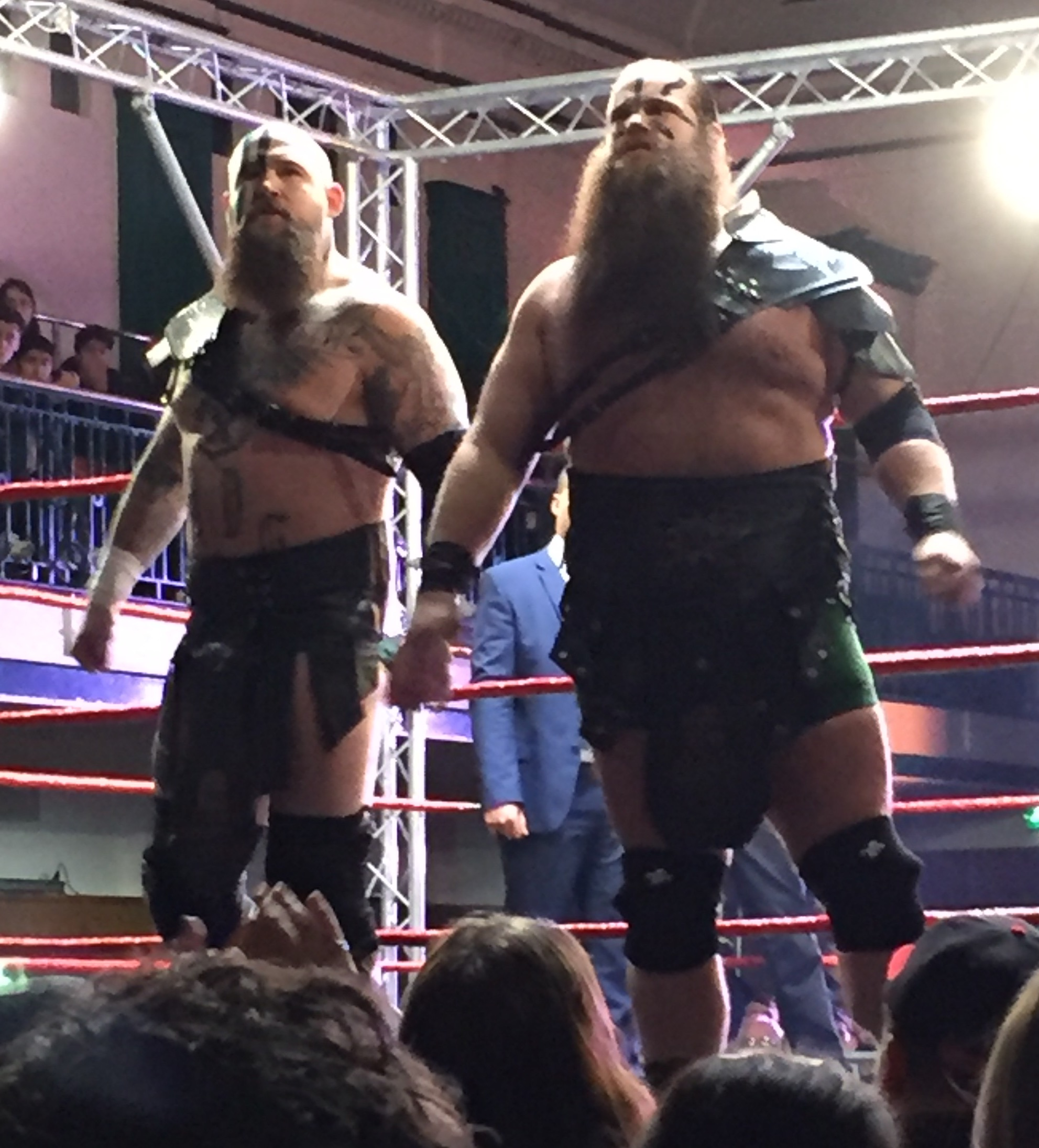
- Erik (left) and Ivar (right) in January 2017

Tag team
- Name(s): The Viking Experience; The Viking Raiders; War Machine; War Raiders
- Members: Hanson / Ivar; Raymond Rowe / Rowe / Erik
- Billed heights: 6 ft 2 in (1.88 m) – Hanson/Ivar; 6 ft 1 in (1.85 m) – Rowe/Erik
- Combined billed weight: 597 lb (271 kg)
- Former members: Sarah Logan/Valhalla (valet)
- Debut: February 22, 2014
- Years active: 2014–present

The War Raiders are an American professional wrestling tag team consisting of Erik and Ivar. They are signed to WWE, where they perform on the SmackDown brand and are former two-time World Tag Team Champions. They also perform on WWE sister promotion Lucha Libre AAA Worldwide (AAA), where they are former AAA World Tag Team Champions.

Rowe and Smith were earlier known as War Machine as Rowe worked with his real name, while Smith worked as Hanson. They're known for working in New Japan Pro-Wrestling (NJPW) and Ring of Honor (ROH), where they won the IWGP Tag Team Championship and the ROH World Tag Team Championship. Outside of Ring of Honor, they have also worked for many independent promotions in the United Kingdom and United States, including Insane Championship Wrestling (ICW), Revolution Pro Wrestling (RPW), Progress Wrestling (Progress) and Pro Wrestling Guerrilla (PWG). War Machine have also competed in Japan for Pro Wrestling Noah (Noah). They signed with WWE in 2018 as War Raiders and began performing on the NXT brand where they won the NXT Tag Team Championship once. In April 2019, they were drafted to WWE's Raw brand, briefly under the name The Viking Experience, as Erik (Rowe) and Ivar (Hanson), before being renamed The Viking Raiders.

== History ==
=== Ring of Honor and New Japan Pro-Wrestling (2014–2018) ===
In 2014, Hanson and Rowe participated in the Top Prospect Tournament, where they met in the finals. Hanson defeated Rowe to win the tournament. Afterwards, they formed a tag team under the name War Machine. On April 11, Hanson and Rowe both signed contracts with ROH. On August 22, 2015, War Machine defeated Killer Elite Squad (Davey Boy Smith Jr. and Lance Archer) in a non-title match and afterwards challenged them to a match for their GHC Tag Team Championship, a title owned by the Japanese Pro Wrestling Noah promotion. War Machine received their title shot in Japan on September 19, but were defeated by the Killer Elite Squad. On December 18 at Final Battle, War Machine defeated The Kingdom (Matt Taven and Michael Bennett) to win the ROH World Tag Team Championship. They lost the title to The Addiction (Christopher Daniels and Frankie Kazarian) on May 9, 2016, at War of the Worlds. In late 2016, War Machine took part in New Japan Pro-Wrestling's 2016 World Tag League, where they finished with a record of four wins and three losses, failing to advance to the finals. Hanson and Rowe debuted for the United Kingdom based Revolution Pro Wrestling in January 2017, unsuccessfully challenging Joel Redman and Charlie Sterling for the Undisputed British Tag Team Championship.

On April 9, 2017, at New Japan's Sakura Genesis 2017, War Machine defeated Tencozy (Hiroyoshi Tenzan and Satoshi Kojima) to win the IWGP Tag Team Championship. They lost the title to Guerrillas of Destiny (Tama Tonga and Tanga Loa) on June 11 at Dominion 6.11 in Osaka-jo Hall, regaining it in a No Disqualification match on July 1 at G1 Special in USA. They lost the title to Killer Elite Squad in a three-way match, also involving Guerrillas of Destiny, on September 24 at Destruction in Kobe. War Machine finished with ROH at Final Battle on December 15, 2017 and on December 16, 2017. They had their final matches with NJPW on January 4, 2018, at Wrestle Kingdom 12, and January 5, 2018 at New Year's Dash.

=== WWE ===
==== NXT (2018–2019) ====
On January 16, 2018, Rowe and Hanson signed a contract with WWE and reported to the WWE Performance Center.

During a TV taping before NXT TakeOver: New Orleans, Rowe and Hanson debuted under the name War Raiders, interfering in a match between Heavy Machinery (Tucker Knight and Otis Dozovic) and Tino Sabbatelli and Riddick Moss, causing it to end in a no contest. Over the following weeks, they started a winning streak, defeating NXT teams such as The Mighty and Heavy Machinery. On the October 17 episode of NXT, they challenged The Undisputed Era (Kyle O'Reilly and Roderick Strong) for the NXT Tag Team Championship, but won by disqualification after Bobby Fish attacked them with a steel chair; thus, they did not win the titles. War Raiders would go on to main event NXT TakeOver: WarGames II in Los Angeles teaming with Ricochet and Pete Dunne against The Undisputed Era in the WarGames match. At NXT TakeOver: Phoenix, Rowe and Hanson defeated The Undisputed Era to win the NXT Tag Team Championship. They successfully defended their tag team championships at NXT TakeOver: New York against the team of Ricochet and Aleister Black.

==== Raw (2019–2021) ====
On April 15, 2019, they debuted on Raw as The Viking Experience, with Rowe and Hanson now called Erik and Ivar. This new name was very negatively received on social media. Pro Wrestling Insider reported that another name considered was "The Berzerkers". They teamed with The Revival to defeat the team of Aleister Black, Ricochet, Curt Hawkins, and Zack Ryder. The next week, the team was renamed The Viking Raiders while their finisher was renamed to "The Viking Experience". They relinquished the NXT Tag Team Championships at the May 1 NXT television tapings (aired May 15). After relinquishing the championship, however, The Viking Raiders were challenged to one final NXT match for the titles by The Street Profits. The match, however, ended in a disqualification after The Forgotten Sons attacked Ivar, followed by an ensuing brawl between the teams.

On the September 9, 2019 episode of Raw in Madison Square Garden, The Viking Raiders saved Cedric Alexander from The O.C., thus turning face once again. On the October 14 episode of Raw, Erik and Ivar captured the Raw Tag Team Championship from Robert Roode and Dolph Ziggler, becoming the first tag team in history to win tag team championships in ROH, New Japan and WWE. However, they suffered their first loss as a team in WWE at Crown Jewel in a tag team turmoil match for the WWE Tag Team World Cup, ultimately losing the last match against The O.C. At Survivor Series, they defeated The New Day and The Undisputed Era in a champions triple threat tag team match, scoring Raw's only victory at the event, which was ultimately won by NXT. On the January 20th episode of Raw they lost the titles to Seth Rollins and Buddy Murphy ending their reign at 98 days. On the May 4 episode of Raw, The Viking Raiders defeated The Street Profits in a non-title match. In the following weeks, The Viking Raiders would feud with The Street Profits as they faced each other in several competitions such as basketball, axe-throwing, golf, bowling, and a decathlon which was later dubbed as the "Anything You Can Do, We Can Do Better" series. A running gag in these segments would see the women involved in the competitions flirting with Ivar and ignoring Erik much to his annoyance. The series would end with a 3–3 tie between the Street Profits and The Viking Raiders. This led to a match scheduled between the two teams for the Raw Tag Team Titles at Backlash. However, the match never began as The Street Profits and The Viking Raiders brawled backstage which also saw them work together to fend off Akira Tozawa and a gang of ninjas on motorcycles. The Street Profits and The Viking Raiders continued brawling afterwards until they fell into a dumpster. On the June 22 episode of Raw, The Viking Raiders finally received their Raw Tag Team Title match against The Street Profits where they were defeated. On the September 7 episode of Raw, The Hurt Business defeated Apollo Crews, Ricochet, and the Raiders in an eight-man tag team match, with Alexander scoring the pinfall over Ricochet, with the match being forced to an abrupt ending due to Ivar suffering a legitimate cervical injury during the match. On September 14, Ivar underwent successful surgery to repair a neck injury thus rendering him out of action and putting the team on hiatus.

After a seven month absence, The Viking Raiders returned on the April 12, 2021 episode of Raw, defeating Cedric Alexander and Shelton Benjamin. On the June 7 episode of Raw, The Viking Raiders would win a battle royal to determine to #1 contenders for the Raw Tag Titles. It would be announced that The Viking Raiders would face the Raw Tag Team champions, AJ Styles and Omos at Money In The Bank. At the event, The Viking Raiders would fail to capture the titles, as Styles and Omos retained.

==== Brand switches and hiatus (2021–2024) ====
In the 2021 Draft, The Viking Raiders were drafted to the SmackDown brand. On February 19, 2022 at the Elimination Chamber, they were attacked by The Usos before their match for the SmackDown Tag Team Championship, but on the March 4 episode of SmackDown they unsuccessfully challenged the Usos for the titles. On the June 24 show of SmackDown the Viking Raiders would return with new gear and face paint, being called "The Vicious" Viking Raiders, and would violently attack The New Day & Shanky, turning heel, and began a feud with the New Day ending on the September 2 show of SmackDown in a Viking Rules Match (No rules, Falls Count Anywhere) which the Viking Raiders won. It was later reported that Erik suffered an injured foot in that match, and will be sidelined indefinitely, putting the team on hiatus.

On the April 9, 2024, Ivar returned to NXT to challenge NXT North American Champion Oba Femi for the title but failed to defeat Femi at Week 2 of Spring Breakin'. On the May 14 episode of NXT, Ivar, Wes Lee and Josh Briggs were victims from a backstage attack by the returning Gallus. Ivar would later confirm that he is suffering from a spinal injury.

==== Return (2024–present) ====
In October 2024, cryptic messages began airing on Raw featuring Nordic characters that translate to "WAR" to promote the team's return. On the October 14 episode of Raw, Ivar and Erik returned defeating Alpha Academy reverting back to their War Raiders name and gimmick, re-establishing themselves as fan favorites. They would win the World Tag Team Championship from The Judgment Day (Finn Bálor and JD McDonagh) on the December 16 episode of Raw. At Night 1 of WrestleMania 41 on April 19, 2025, they lost the titles to The New Day (Kofi Kingston and Xavier Woods), ending their reign at 124 days. On June 2, Valhalla announced that WWE had chosen not to renew her contract.

On the December 16 episode of Raw, The War Raiders defeated Bálor and McDonagh to become two-time World Tag Team Champions. At Night 1 of WrestleMania 41 on April 19, 2025, they lost the titles to The New Day (Kofi Kingston and Xavier Woods), ending their reign at 124 days. On the May 25, episode of Raw the War Raiders unsuccessfully challenged for the World Tag Team Championship in a Triple Threat Tag Team Match against The New Day and The Creed Brothers. After winning several matches, The War Raiders would once again challenge for the World Tag Team Championship on the December 8, episode of Raw in a losing effort to AJ Styles and Dragon Lee.

On the August 14, 2026, episode of Smackdown Ivar and Erick returned to WWE television to challenge Damien Priest and R Truth and The MFTs in a Triple Threat Tag Team match for the WWE Tag Team Championships which they lost. On the September 11, episode of Smackdown The War Raiders successfully defended their AAA World Tag Team Championships vs. Damien Priest and R Truth.

==== AAA (2026-present) ====
On the January 31 episode of AAA, The War Raiders are teased to make their debut 2 weeks later. On the February 2 episode of Raw, they were both attacked by Oba Femi. Ivar and Erik made their debuted on AAA on February 14, 2026, on AAA on FOX, where they won a triple threat tag team match against Money Machine and Los Americanos to become the number one contenders for the AAA World Tag Team Championship. At Noche de Los Grandes on May 30, 2026, the War Raiders defeated Pagano and Psycho Clown to win the AAA World Tag Team Championships for the first time. On September 13, at night two on TripleManía 34 The War Raiders issued an open challenge for the AAA World Tag Team Championships which was accepted by The Wagner Brothers (El Hijo de Dr. Wagner Jr. and Galeno) who defeated them putting an end to their 106 days reign.

== Championships and accomplishments ==
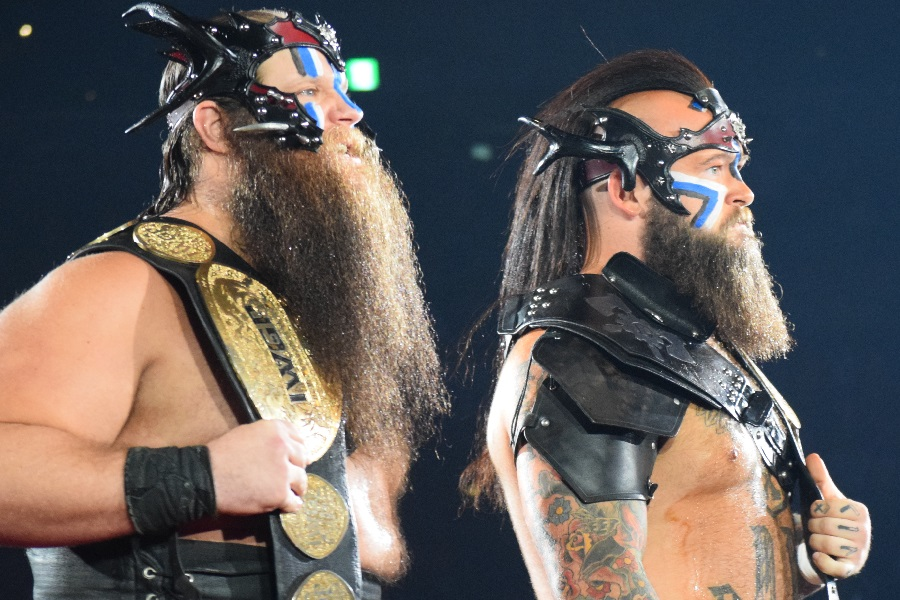
War Machine as the IWGP Tag Team Champions

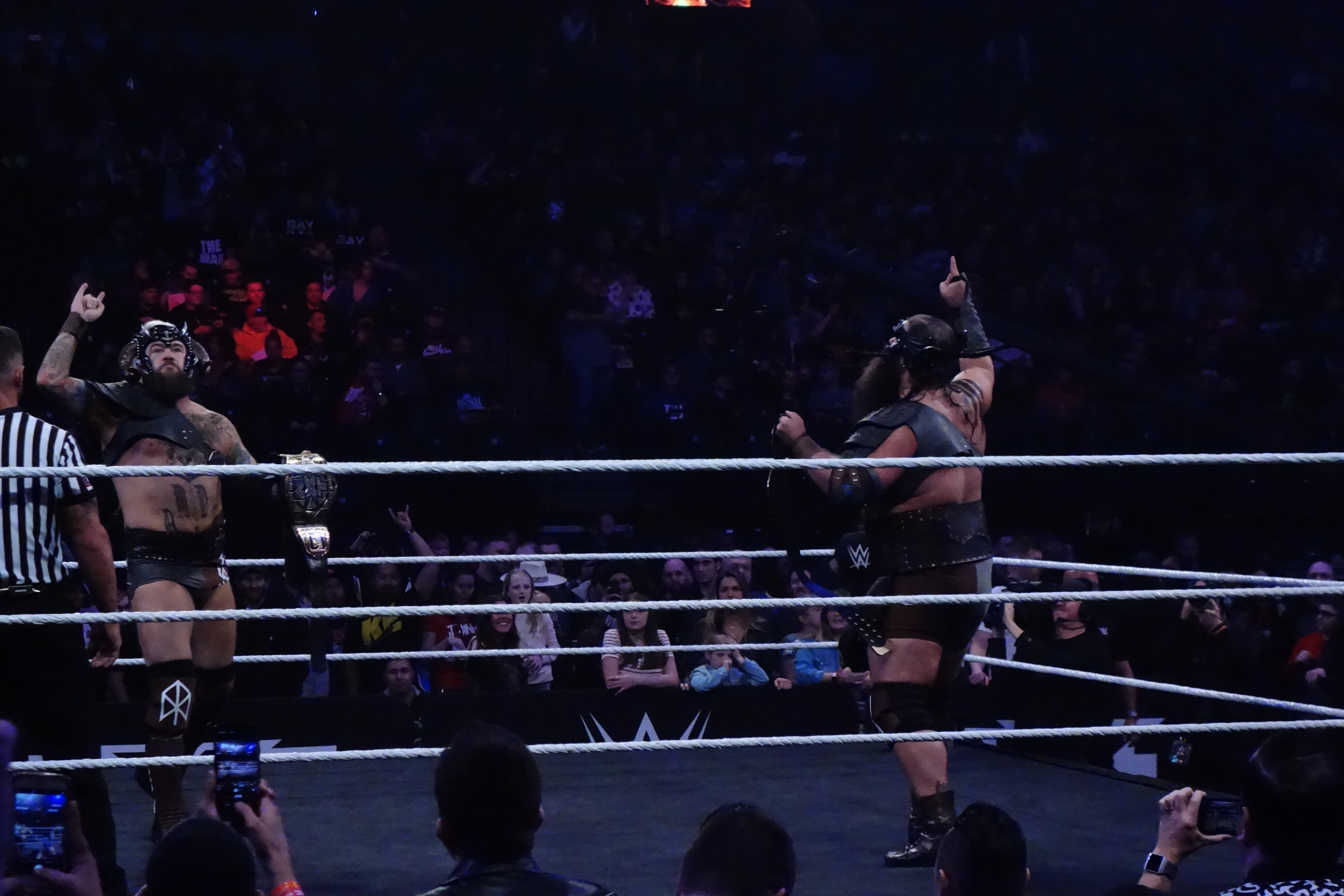
War Raiders as the NXT Tag Team Champions

- Brew City Wrestling
  - BCW Tag Team Championship (1 time)
- Lucha Libre AAA Worldwide
  - AAA World Tag Team Championship (1 time)
- New Japan Pro-Wrestling
  - IWGP Tag Team Championship (2 times)
- Pro Wrestling Illustrated
  - Ranked Hanson No. 108 of the 500 best singles wrestlers in the PWI 500 in 2016
  - Ranked Rowe No. 97 of the 500 best singles wrestlers in the PWI 500 in 2016
- Ring of Honor
  - ROH World Tag Team Championship (1 time)
- VIP Wrestling
  - VIP Tag Team Championship (1 time)
- What Culture Pro Wrestling
  - WCPW Tag Team Championship (1 time)
- WWE
  - World Tag Team Championship (2 times)
  - NXT Tag Team Championship (1 time)
  - WWE Speed Championship #1 Contender Tournament (February 28-March 19, 2025) – Ivar
  - World Tag Team Championship #1 Contender Tournament (2024)
