= Alpha Academy =

Professional wrestling stable

- The stable's logo

Statistics
- Members: Otis; Akira Tozawa
- Name: Alpha Academy
- Billed heights: Otis: 5 ft 10 in (1.78 m); Akira Tozawa: 5 ft 7 in (1.70 m)
- Combined billed weight: 823 lb (373 kg)
- Former members: Chad Gable (leader); Maxxine Dupri
- Debut: November 13, 2020
- Years active: 2020–present
- Website: jointhealphaacademy.com

Alpha Academy is a heroic professional wrestling tag team performing in WWE on the Raw brand composed of Otis and Akira Tozawa.

Formed as a tag team, original leader Chad Gable and Otis are longtime best friends in real life, with their friendship dating back to 2011, where they trained for the Olympic Games together in Colorado Springs. The two are now neighbors on the same street. Gable and Otis are former one-time WWE Raw Tag Team Champions as part of the stable, and former member Maxxine Dupri was a one-time WWE Women's Intercontinental Champion.

== History ==
=== Formation and Raw Tag Team Champions (2020–2023) ===
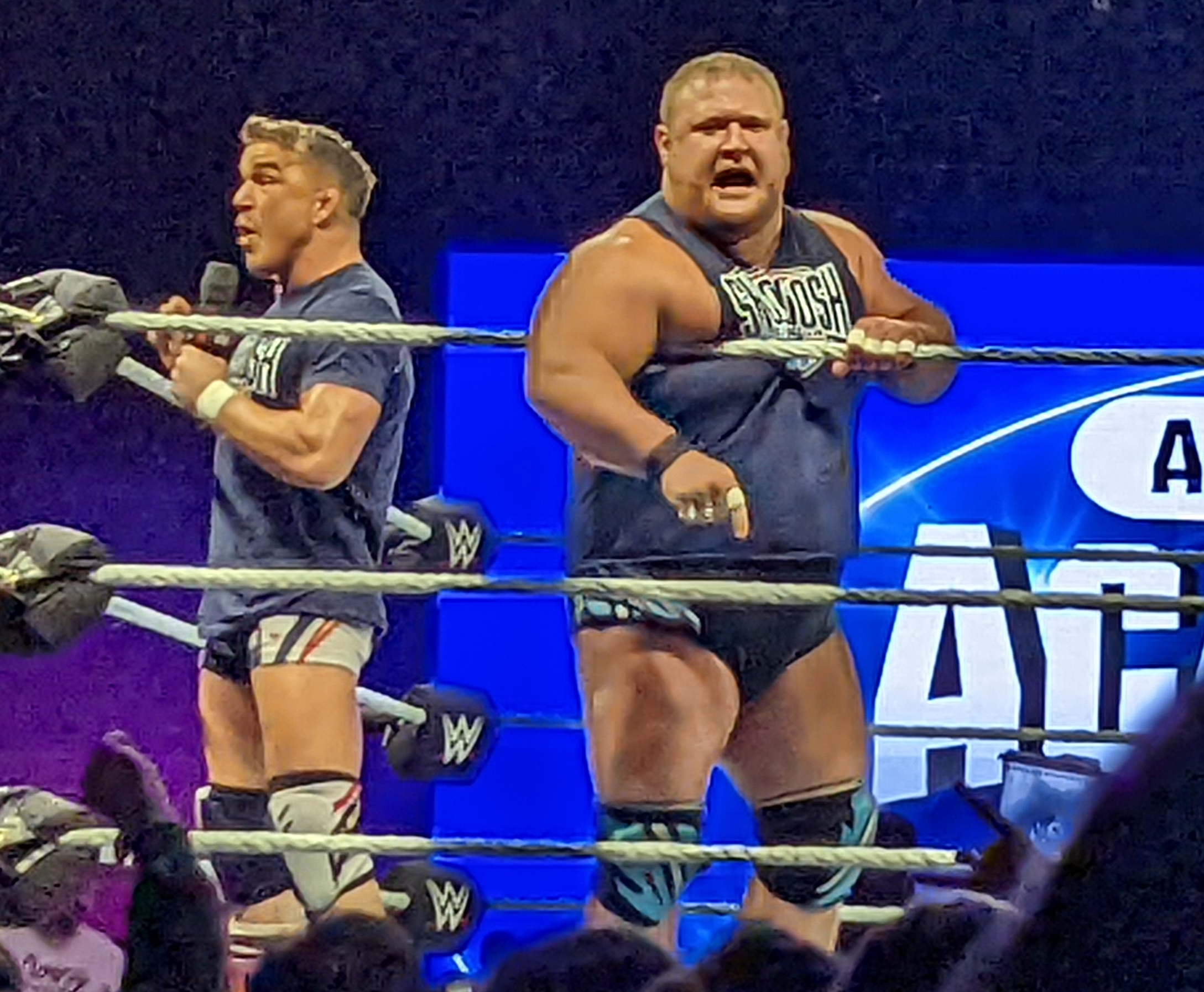
Alpha Academy (Chad Gable (left) and Otis (right)) in 2022

On November 13, 2020 episode of SmackDown, Chad Gable opened the "Alpha Academy" (a nod to his former tag team of American Alpha with Jason Jordan) and recruited Otis as his client. The team made their debut on the December 11 episode of SmackDown in a defeat to the team of Cesaro and Shinsuke Nakamura. At TLC: Tables, Ladders and Chairs, Gable and Otis teamed with Big E and Daniel Bryan to defeat Cesaro, Nakamura, King Corbin, and Intercontinental Champion Sami Zayn in an eight-man tag team match. On the February 19, 2021 episode of SmackDown, Gable ordered Otis to attack Rey Mysterio after their tag team match, thus turning them into heels.

As part of the 2021 Draft in October, Alpha Academy were drafted to the Raw brand. On the January 10, 2022 episode of Raw, Alpha Academy defeated RK-Bro (Randy Orton and Riddle) to win the Raw Tag Team Championship. They would both enter in the Royal Rumble match but failed to win. On the March 7 episode of Raw, Alpha Academy dropped the titles back to RK-Bro, ending their reign at 55 days. On Day 2 of WrestleMania 38 on April 3, Alpha Academy failed to regain the titles from RK-Bro in a triple-threat match also involving the Street Profits (Angelo Dawkins and Montez Ford).

=== Addition of Maxxine Dupri and Akira Tozawa (2023–2024) ===
On the March 13, 2023 episode of Raw, Gable found Otis backstage taking part in a photo shoot with Maximum Male Models (the team of ma.çé and mån.sôör, managed by Maxxine Dupri). Otis then decided to leave with Maximum Male Models instead of Gable. This would start a series of segments between Dupri and Gable where they both wanted Otis to be on their respective teams. Dupri joined Alpha Academy on the May 15 episode of Raw when she cheered on Otis and Gable eliminating ma.çé and mån.sôör in the Intercontinental Championship number one contenders' battle royal match.

In the weeks that followed, Alpha Academy began to slowly turn face with their crowd reactions growing louder and louder. After weeks of training, Dupri made her in-ring debut on the July 3 episode of Raw in a mixed six-person tag team match with Gable and Otis against The Viking Raiders (Erik, Ivar and Valhalla). Dupri pinned Valhalla after performing a sunset flip on her. On the July 10 episode of Raw, Alpha Academy held a graduation ceremony for Dupri. At the end of the ceremony, Gable presented Dupri with her own Alpha Academy letterman's jacket. As Dupri was about to put on the jacket, The Viking Raiders appeared on the ramp to distract the team. Valhalla then attacked Dupri from behind and stole her jacket. In the following episode of Raw, Gable and Otis fought Erik and Ivar in a "Viking Rules" match. Despite dominating the match, Gable and Otis lost but Dupri managed to take back her jacket. On the July 31 episode of Raw, Dupri defeated Valhalla with a Japanese Ocean Cyclone Suplex in her debut singles match. As the team was celebrating backstage, Imperium's Gunther took offense to Dupri's match win and mocked the team. Ludwig Kaiser then challenged Gable to last five minutes in the ring with Gunther, which Gable accepted. Despite Gable beating the clock, Gunther demanded the match to continue and defeated Gable. On the August 7 episode of Raw, Gable defeated Tommaso Ciampa, Matt Riddle, and Ricochet in a fatal four-way match to be the number one contender to Gunther's Intercontinental Championship. Later that night, Otis lost to Kaiser after an interference from Imperium. Two weeks later on Raw, Gable challenged Gunther for the Intercontinental Championship and won by countout. However, as championships do not change hands by countout or disqualification, Gunther remained champion.

The group expanded with Akira Tozawa joining the stable and being assigned as a "junior member" on the October 23 episode of Raw. In a bid to prove himself to the stable, Tozawa challenged Bronson Reed to a match but lost. The following day, Tozawa appeared on Night 1 of NXT: Halloween Havoc and stole Noam Dar's NXT Heritage Cup. Tozawa would return the Cup to Dar on Night 2 before managing to spook Dar into a match for the Cup on the following week's NXT but lost the match 2-1 under British Round Rules. On the November 20 episode of Raw, Dupri teamed up with Diamond Mine's Ivy Nile in a fatal four-way tag team match for a WWE Women's Tag Team Championship opportunity but was not successful. On the December 11 episode of Raw, Nile accompanied Dupri in her non-title match against Women's World Champion Rhea Ripley. Ripley won by submission but did not release the hold until Nile entered the ring to save Dupri. Dupri made her Royal Rumble match debut at the titular event on January 27, 2024, entering as the 18th entrant. She lasted over six minutes and was eliminated by eventual winner Bayley.

=== Dissension and split from Chad Gable (2024) ===
During the buildup to WrestleMania XL, Gable was involved in a storyline where he trained Sami Zayn for his Intercontinental Championship match against Gunther, which Zayn won. As a token of appreciation, Zayn gave Gable a title match on the April 15 episode of Raw but Gable was unsuccessful in winning the title. After the match, Gable turned heel and attacked Zayn as he was celebrating with his wife at ringside. On the following week, Gable said that he had spent too much time training "losers" such as Zayn and his stablemates. He then declared that the stable's focus will now be on Gable winning the Intercontinental Championship. On the April 29 episode of Raw, Zayn defended his title against Bronson Reed, which he won by disqualification after Gable attacked him. One week later, Zayn attacked Gable during his match with Reed, causing another disqualification. It was then announced that Zayn will defend the Intercontinental Championship in a triple threat match against Gable and Reed at King and Queen of the Ring. In a live event on May 13, Dupri lost to Shayna Baszler in the first round of the Queen of the Ring tournament, with Dupri replacing Latino World Order's Zelina Vega who was not medically cleared to compete. At King and Queen of the Ring on May 25, Zayn successfully retained his title against Gable and Reed. At Clash at the Castle: Scotland on June 15, Gable failed to win the title from Zayn, ending their feud, after Otis and Dupri refused to interfere on Gable's behalf. Two days later on Raw, Otis, Dupri and Tozawa walked out on Gable, who in turn left Alpha Academy. At the end of the night, Gable was attacked by the debuting Wyatt Sicks led by Uncle Howdy.

Gable attempted to reunite with Otis numerous times but was ultimately rebuffed. On the July 15 episode of Raw, Otis, Dupri and Tozawa agreed to team up with The New Day's Xavier Woods in his feud against The Final Testament. On the following week, the team of Otis, Tozawa and Woods were defeated by The Final Testament's Karrion Kross and The Authors of Pain (Akam and Rezar) in a six-man tag team match. After the match, Gable, together with the newly aligned Creed Brothers (Julius and Brutus), continued to convince Otis, Tozawa and Dupri to reunite. Otis refused and he and Tozawa were beaten down by Gable and The Creed Brothers.

=== Various feuds (2024–present) ===
On the November 25, 2024 episode of Raw, Otis and Tozawa defeated The New Day, seemingly triggering a massive breakdown regarding Xavier Woods and Kofi Kingston's near ten year friendship. On the April 21, 2025 episode of Raw, Otis and Tozawa were set to face the WWE World Tag Team Champions, The New Day, in a non-title match. Right when the match was about to start, a returning Rusev attacked Otis and Tozawa while The New Day was out of the ring. On the November 17 episode of Raw, Dupri defeated Becky Lynch to win the WWE Women's Intercontinental Championship after an interference from AJ Lee. At the Raw on Netflix Anniversary Show on January 5, Dupri lost the title back to Becky Lynch, ending her reign at 49 days. On the June 22, 2026 episode of Raw, Chad Gable (now a babyface) apologized to the Alpha Academy for his actions during his heel turn in 2024, Otis and Tozawa seemingly accepted his apology but Dupri did not. She recalled Gable's actions towards herself, Otis and Tozawa, and stated "we didn't need you then, and we don't need you now." All 3 members left Gable alone. On the July 6, 2026 episode of Raw, Dupri left Alpha Academy to join The Vision after helping the latter win the World Tag Team Championships. On the July 13 episode, Dupri and the rest of The Vision attacked Otis and Tozawa, officially signifying her exit from the group.

== Members ==
*	Founding member(s)
L	Leader

Member		Joined
Otis	*	November 13, 2020
Akira Tozawa		October 23, 2023

=== Former ===
Member		Joined	Left
Chad Gable	*L	November 13, 2020	June 17, 2024
Maxxine Dupri		May 15, 2023	July 6, 2026

== Championships and accomplishments ==
- Pro Wrestling Illustrated
  - Ranked No. 69 of the top 500 singles wrestlers in the PWI 500 in 2020 (Otis)
  - Ranked No. 123 of the top 500 singles wrestlers in the PWI 500 in 2020 (Gable)
- WWE
  - WWE Raw Tag Team Championship (1 time) – Gable and Otis
  - WWE Women's Intercontinental Championship (1 time) – Dupri
- Wrestling Observer Newsletter
  - Most Underrated (2023) – Gable
