= The Vision (professional wrestling) =

Professional wrestling stable

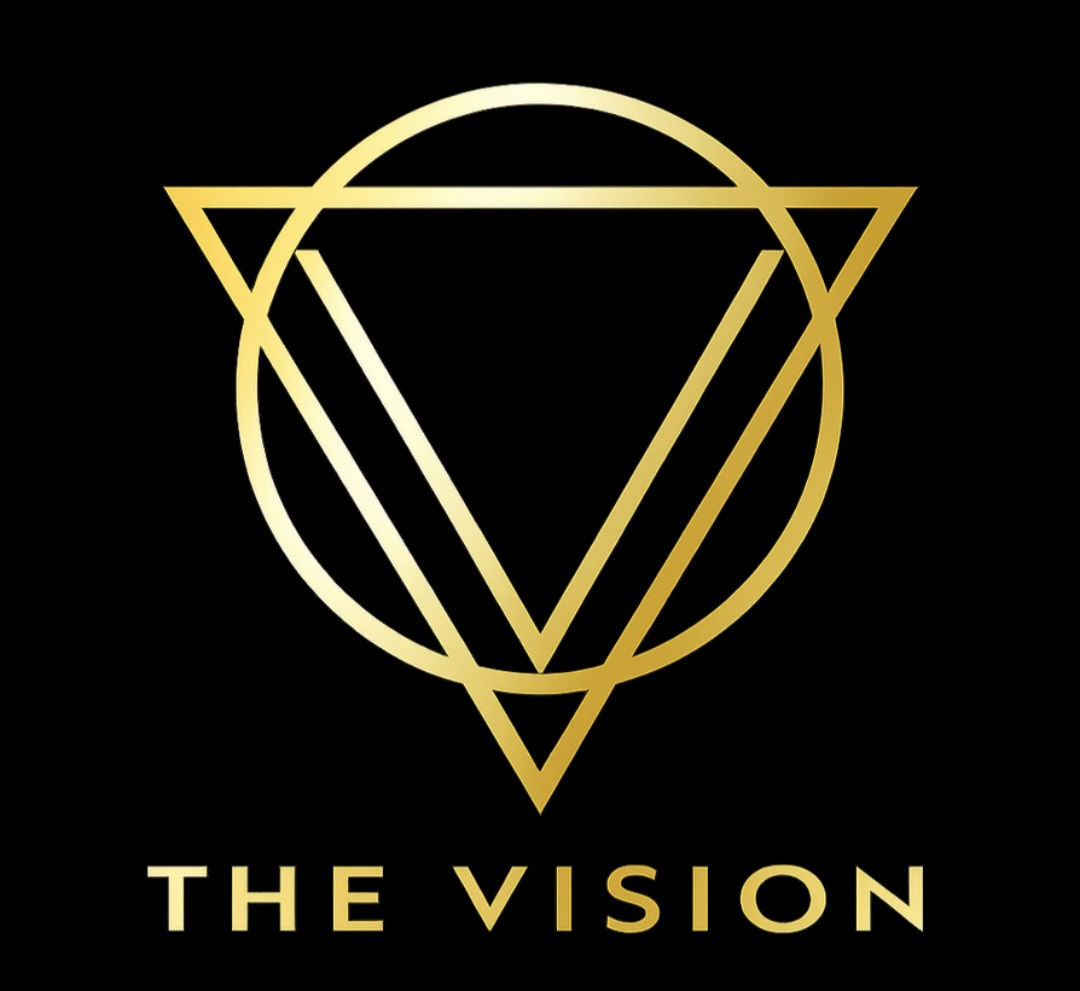
- The stable's logo

Stable
- Name: The Vision
- Members: Bron Breakker; Bronson Reed; Logan Paul; Austin Theory; Maxxine Dupri
- Former members: Seth Rollins (leader); Paul Heyman (manager)
- Debut: April 21, 2025
- Years active: 2025–present

The Vision is a villainous professional wrestling stable consisting of Bron Breakker, Bronson Reed, Logan Paul, Austin Theory, and Maxxine Dupri. They are signed to WWE and perform on the Raw brand.

As part of the stable, original leader Seth Rollins won the World Heavyweight Championship, the 2025 Money in the Bank contract and WWE Crown Jewel Championship while Breakker, Paul and Theory are former World Tag Team Champions.

== History ==
Formation and Seth Rollins’ leadership (2025)

On April 19, 2025, at Night 1 of WrestleMania 41, Seth Rollins defeated CM Punk and Roman Reigns with the help of Paul Heyman, turning both men heel. In the following weeks, Bron Breakker and Bronson Reed joined Rollins and Heyman, forming The Vision. At Money in the Bank on June 7, Rollins won the men's Money in the Bank ladder match. On July 12, at Saturday Night's Main Event, Rollins was defeated by LA Knight after pretending to suffer a leg injury. On August 2, at Night 1 of SummerSlam, Rollins cashed in his Money in the Bank contract on Punk to win the World Heavyweight Championship after Punk defeated Gunther. On the October 13 episode of Raw, Breakker and Reed attacked Rollins, exiling Rollins from the stable. This was done to write Rollins off television due to a legitimate shoulder injury he sustained at Crown Jewel in the match against Rhodes. Rollins was subsequently forced to vacate the title the following week, ending his second reign at 79 days.

Post Rollins’ betrayal and new members (2025-present)

On November 29, at Survivor Series: WarGames, Breakker and Reed teamed with Brock Lesnar, Drew McIntyre, and Logan Paul in the men's WarGames match against Punk, Reigns, Rhodes and The Usos where they were victorious with Breakker pinning Punk. After Survivor Series, Logan Paul and Austin Theory joined The Vision. On the Raw on Netflix Anniversary Show on January 5, 2026, Breakker failed to win the World Heavyweight Championship from Punk. Both Breakker and Reed suffered real-life injuries in February, forcing them to take time off from wrestling.

On the March 30 episode of Raw, Paul and Theory defeated The Usos in a Street Fight to win the World Tag Team Championship after YouTuber IShowSpeed accidentally knocked out Knight with brass knuckles. This led to a match between Speed, Paul and Theory against Knight and The Usos on Night 1 of WrestleMania 42 on April 18, with the former team losing and Paul betraying Speed after the match ending their feud. Later that night, Breakker also made his return, attacking Rollins and costing him his match against Gunther.

The Street Profits (Angelo Dawkins and Montez Ford) would return on the April 20 episode of Raw and begun feuding with the Vision over the tag team championships. Breakker and Rollins would face each other at Backlash, with the latter losing the match. After Paul and Theory successfully defended their titles against the Street Profits at Saturday Night's Main Event on May 23, it was announced that Paul had suffered a torn tricep and would be out for "months". Due to Paul's injury, Breakker defended the tag titles alongside Theory. On the June 22 episode of Raw, Breakker and Theory lost the titles to The Street Profits after interference from Joe Hendry and Rollins ending their reign at 84 days. Five days later, at Night of Champions, Breakker lost against his former mentor in a Steel Cage Match ending their feud.

On the July 6 episode of Raw, Maxxine Dupri, who had been courted by Theory left Alpha Academy to join The Vision after helping the latter win the World Tag Team Championships from The Street Profits. The following week on Raw, Heyman abandoned the group. At Sunday Night's Main Event on September 6, Reed made his return during Breakker and Oba Femi’s match and attacked the latter. At Money in the Bank on October 10, Reed lost to Femi despite assistance from Dupri, Paul and Theory while Breakker failed to win the Money in the Bank ladder match. On November 7, at Crown Jewel, Theory and Breakker lost the World Tag Team Titles to Je'Von Evans and Penta ending their second reign at 124 days. During the match, Bronson Reed interfered; however, he was later hospitalized after suffering rib and kidney injuries.

== Members ==
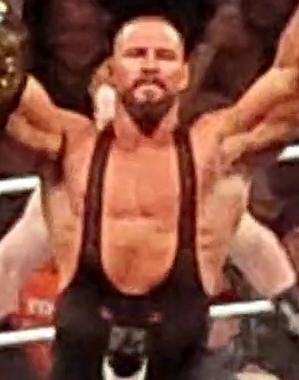
Bron Breakker (*)

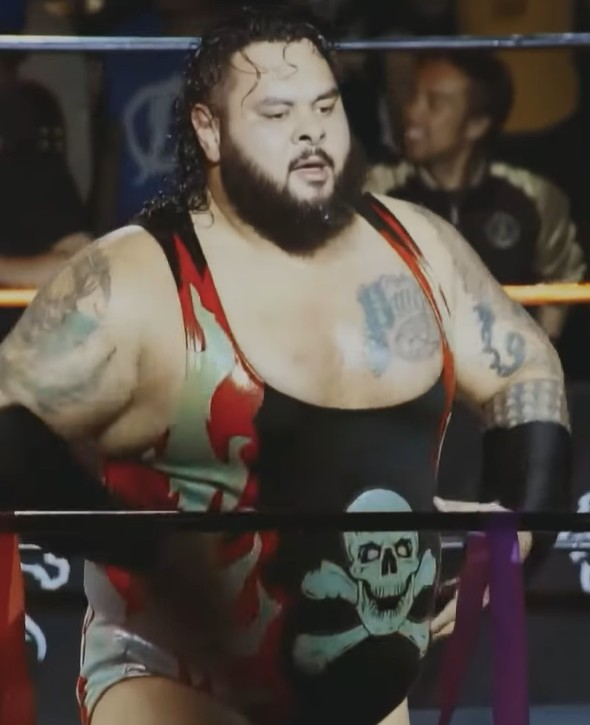
Bronson Reed

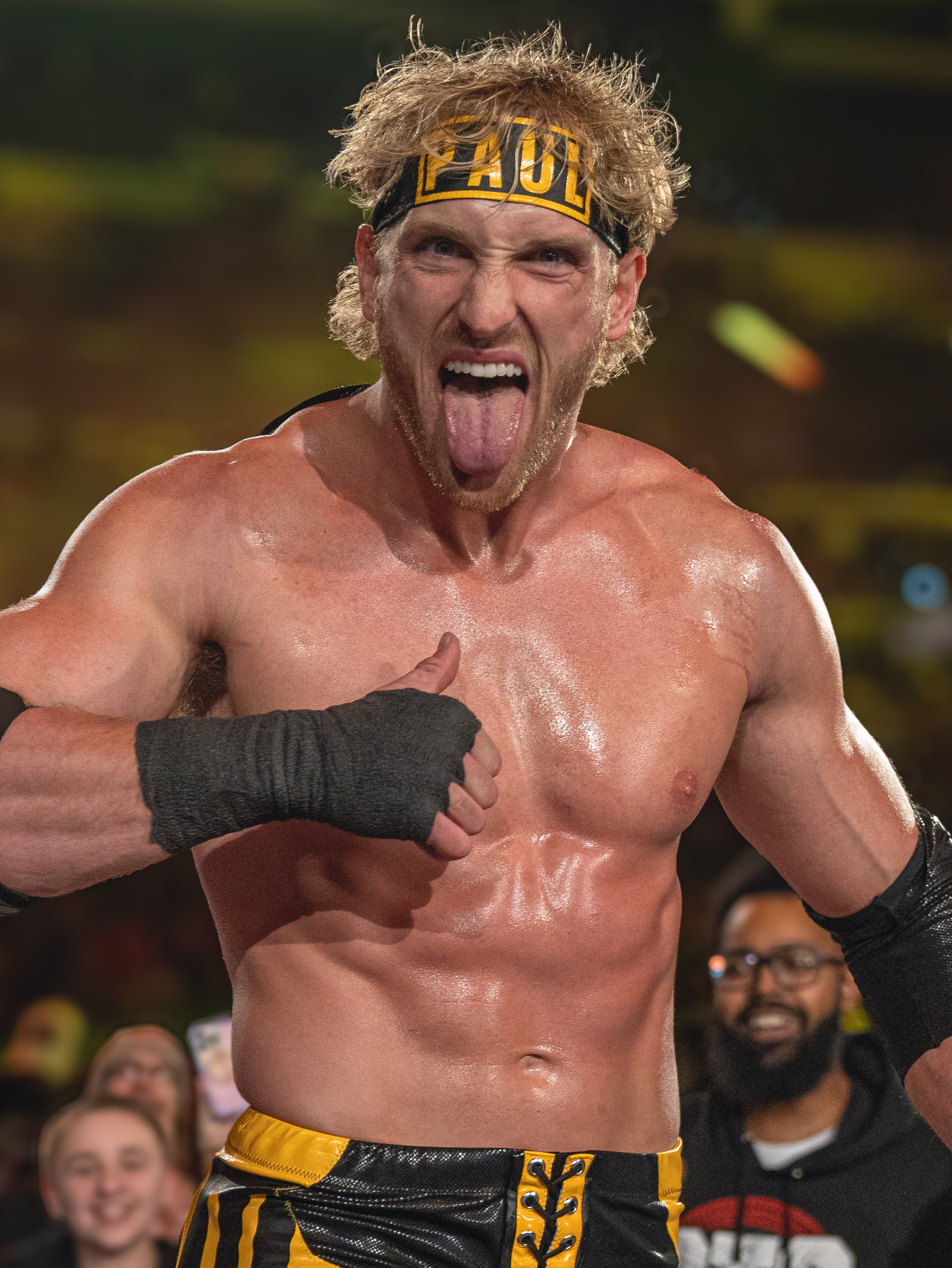
Logan Paul

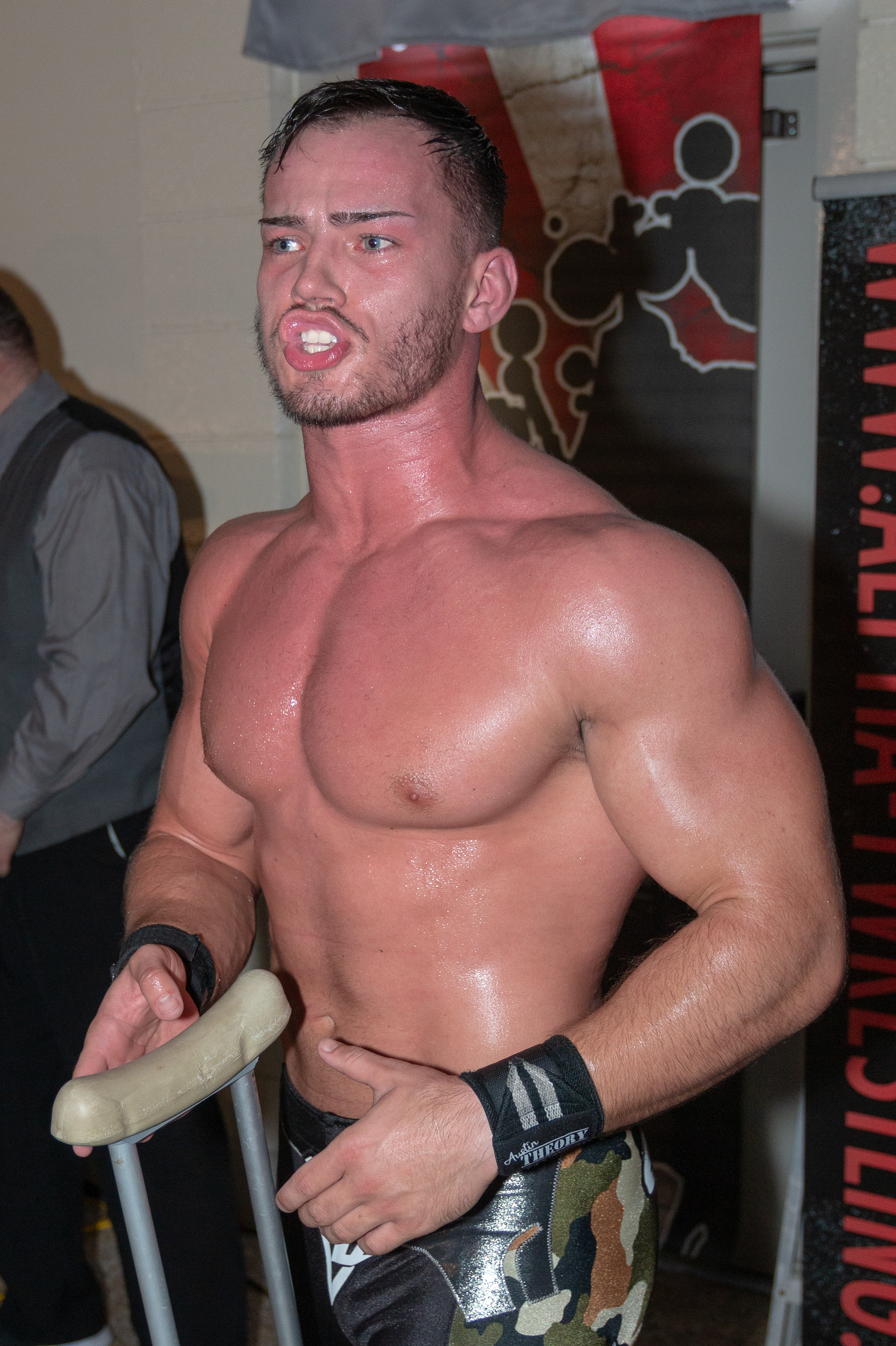
Austin Theory

Maxxine Dupri

*	Founding member
L	Leader(s)
M	Manager

=== Current ===
Member		Joined
Bron Breakker	*	April 21, 2025
Bronson Reed		May 24, 2025
Logan Paul		December 1, 2025
Austin Theory		December 29, 2025
Maxxine Dupri		July 6, 2026

=== Former ===
Member		Joined	Left
Seth Rollins	*L	April 21, 2025	October 13, 2025
Paul Heyman	*M	April 21, 2025	July 13, 2026

== Championships and accomplishments ==
- Pro Wrestling Illustrated
  - Most Hated Wrestler of the Year (2025) – Logan Paul
- WWE
  - World Heavyweight Championship (1 time) – Seth Rollins
  - World Tag Team Championship (2 times) – Theory and Paul/Breakker (Note: During the group’s first World Tag Team Championship reign, Theory originally won the title with Paul however, Paul suffered an injury and was replaced by Breakker.) (1), Theory and Breakker (1)
  - WWE Crown Jewel Championship (2025) – Seth Rollins
  - Men's Money in the Bank (2025) – Seth Rollins
