= WWE Raw on Netflix Anniversary Show =

Professional wrestling television special

- Promotional poster featuring CM Punk and Bron Breakker
- Promotion: WWE
- Brand: Raw
- Date: January 5, 2026
- City: Brooklyn, New York
- Venue: Barclays Center
- Attendance: 14,728

Raw special episodes chronology
← Previous; Raw premiere on Netflix	Next → Raw in Mexico City special

The Monday Night Raw on Netflix Anniversary Show, also promoted as Raw is Stranger Things, was an American professional wrestling television special produced by WWE. It marked the one-year anniversary of WWE's weekly WWE Raw program on the streaming service Netflix. The event took place on January 5, 2026, at Barclays Center in Brooklyn, New York, and featured performers from the Raw brand. This episode of Raw also served as a crossover with Netflix original franchise Stranger Things, following the conclusion of its television series finale.

Four matches were contested on the episode. In the main event, CM Punk defeated Bron Breakker to retain the World Heavyweight Championship. In other matches contested, Becky Lynch defeated Maxxine Dupri to win her second WWE Women's Intercontinental Championship, becoming the first multi-time holder of the title, Liv Morgan defeated Lyra Valkyria in Morgan's first televised singles match since June 2025 following her return from injury, and in the opening contest, Rhea Ripley and Iyo Sky defeated The Kabuki Warriors (Asuka and Kairi Sane) to win the WWE Women's Tag Team Championship. The episode also saw the signing of NXT's Je'Von Evans to the Raw brand.

== Production ==
=== Background ===
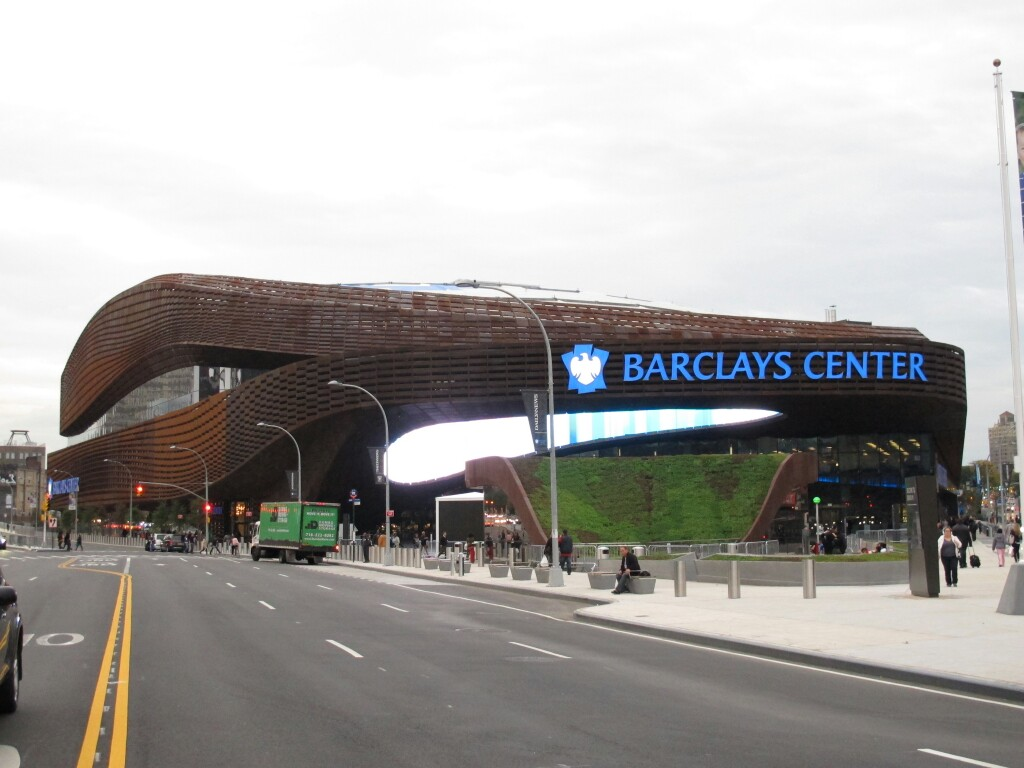
The event took place at the Barclays Center in Brooklyn, New York.

WWE Raw is a professional wrestling television program produced by the American promotion WWE. It first aired on January 11, 1993, on the USA Network and since became the longest-running weekly episodic program in television history with no reruns, airing almost exclusively on USA, apart from a brief run on TNN (renamed to Spike TV in 2003 and now known as the Paramount Network) from 2000 to 2005. It is one of WWE's two flagship television programs, alongside WWE SmackDown, and is also the namesake program for the company's Raw brand, a subdivision of WWE's main roster where wrestlers are exclusively assigned to perform on a weekly basis, albeit with some exceptions.

On January 23, 2024, WWE's parent company TKO Group Holdings announced that Netflix would acquire the rights to Monday Night Raw beginning in January 2025, in what was reported to be a 10-year deal worth $500 million per-year.

On December 25, 2025, Netflix issued a press release through their companion news website Tudum, announcing the first episode of Raw of 2026, scheduled for January 5 at the Barclays Center in Brooklyn, New York, would mark the one-year anniversary of the program on Netflix and would be a crossover television special with the Netflix original series Stranger Things, which aired its series finale on December 31, 2025. In a statement, Netflix said: "The first episode [of Raw] of the year is bound to get a little…strange" [sic], accompanied by a teaser trailer featuring the Stranger Things theme song in the background and both shows' respective logos.

=== Storylines ===
The event included matches that resulted from scripted storylines. Results were predetermined by WWE's writers on the Raw brand, while storylines were produced on WWE's weekly television show Monday Night Raw.

At Survivor Series: WarGames on November 29, 2025, World Heavyweight Champion CM Punk and The Vision's Bron Breakker both participated in the men's WarGames match, where Breakker pinned Punk to earn the victory for his team. On the December 1 episode of Raw, The Vision's manager, Paul Heyman, announced that Punk would defend his championship against Breakker on the one-year anniversary of Raw on Netflix, in what was later confirmed to be the headline match.

Throughout the second half of 2025, Rhea Ripley and Iyo Sky formed a friendship that displeased The Kabuki Warriors (Asuka and Kairi Sane). On the September 22 episode of Raw, The Kabuki Warriors betrayed Sky and attacked Ripley. This led to a tag team match for Crown Jewel where Ripley and Sky defeated The Kabuki Warriors. Throughout the month of October, the rivalry intensified until The Kabuki Warriors injured Ripley and Sky. At Survivor Series: WarGames in the women's WarGames match, Ripley and Sky's team defeated The Kabuki Warriors' team. On the following episode of Raw on December 1, Ripley and Sky announced their desire to win the WWE Women's Tag Team Championship. It was subsequently announced for the Raw on Netflix Anniversary Show.

On the November 17 episode of Raw, Maxxine Dupri defeated Becky Lynch to win the WWE Women's Intercontinental Championship, following interference from Lynch's rival AJ Lee. In the aftermath, Lynch talked of conspiracy and sabotage against her, and boycotted Raw until the December 22 episode, where she confronted Dupri, and demanded a rematch. Dupri accepted and attacked Lynch, and the bout was subsequently made official for the anniversary show.

At the end of the December 1 episode of Raw, The Judgment Day (Liv Morgan, Raquel Rodriguez, and Roxanne Perez) attacked Bayley and Lyra Valkyria. On the December 22 episode of Raw, during a match between Perez and Bayley, Valkyria attacked Morgan and Raquel, helping Bayley win. On the January 2 episode of SmackDown, it was announced that Morgan would face Valkyria at the anniversary show in the former's first televised singles match since June 2025 following her return from injury.

== Results ==
No.	Results	Stipulations	Times
1	Rhea Ripley and Iyo Sky defeated The Kabuki Warriors (Asuka and Kairi Sane) (c) by pinfall	Tag team match for the WWE Women's Tag Team Championship	16:30
2	Becky Lynch defeated Maxxine Dupri (c) by pinfall	Singles match for the WWE Women's Intercontinental Championship	11:35
3	Liv Morgan (with Roxanne Perez) defeated Lyra Valkyria (with Bayley) by pinfall	Singles match	9:00
4	CM Punk (c) defeated Bron Breakker (with Paul Heyman) by pinfall	Singles match for the World Heavyweight Championship	26:40
(c) / – the champion(s) heading into the match

== See also ==
- 2026 in professional wrestling
- Royal Rumble (2026)
