= Otis (wrestler) =

American professional wrestler (born 1991)

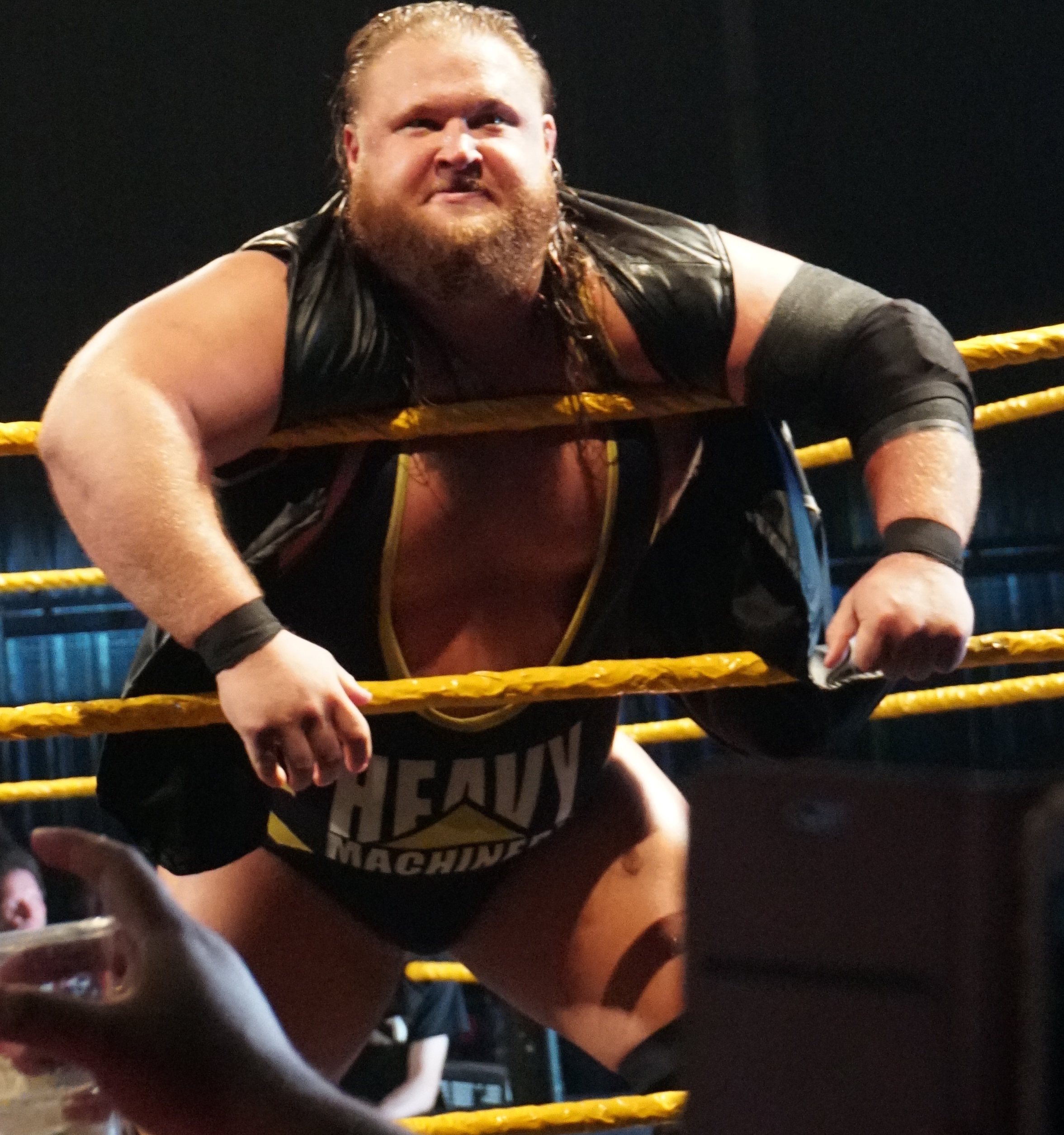
- Otis in 2018

Personal information
- Born: Nikola Michal Bogojević; December 21, 1991 (age 34) Duluth, Minnesota, U.S.

Professional wrestling career
- Ring names: Dozer; El Gran Gordo; Niko Bogojevic; Otis; Otis Dozovic
- Billed height: 5 ft 10 in (178 cm)
- Billed weight: 315 lb (143 kg)
- Billed from: Superior, Wisconsin
- Trained by: Mercury Pro Wrestling Academy; WWE Performance Center
- Debut: October 24, 2015

Nikola Michal Bogojević (born December 21, 1991) is an American professional wrestler. He is signed to WWE, where he performs on the Raw brand under the ring name Otis and is one-half of the Alpha Academy with Akira Tozawa.

After signing with WWE in 2016, he was assigned to their developmental brand NXT, teaming with Tucker Knight as "Heavy Machinery". They were promoted to WWE's main roster in 2018. During his time on the main roster, Otis won the 2020 men's Money in the Bank ladder match and won the WWE Raw Tag Team Championship with Chad Gable as "Alpha Academy" in 2022.

Prior to his professional wrestling career, Bogojevic was an amateur wrestler, winning the 2008 Greco-Roman junior Nationals in his weight class, the national title in the 2011 Junior Pan American Games, and a bronze medal in Greco-Roman wrestling at the 2014 Pan American Sports Festival, and was a prospect for the 2012 Olympic Games team, but was not chosen. In 2018, he was named the PWI Rookie of the Year by Pro Wrestling Illustrated.

== Early life ==
Nikola Bogojević was born on December 21, 1991, in Duluth, Minnesota, and grew up in Superior, Wisconsin. His father Zoran Bogojević was born in Yugoslavia and moved to the United States during the 1970s, naming his son after Nicholas I of Montenegro. Bogojević is dyslexic.

Bogojević began amateur wrestling as a first-grader while his mother Kim was hospitalized from epilepsy. Trained by Joseph Reasbeck among others, he won various wrestling championships as a teenager.

== Amateur wrestling career ==
Competition record

Greco-Roman wrestling

Representing United States

2014 Pan American Sports Festival
3rd	2010	130kg

Bogojević attended Superior High School, where he was a successful amateur wrestler; he was the 2010 285 lb undefeated WIAA State Champion. He was a champion at the 2009 Greco-Roman junior Nationals. He placed third at the 2009 Junior Freestyle championships. Originally committed to the University of Wisconsin, he wrestled at collegiate level for Augsburg University and Colorado State University-Pueblo. He won the national title in Greco-Roman wrestling at the Junior Pan American Games in 2011 and a Greco-Roman bronze at the 2014 Pan American Sports Festival. He was at one point considered a prospect for the United States Greco-Roman wrestling team at the 2012 Summer Olympics and spent some time training at the Olympic Training Center in Colorado.

== Professional wrestling career ==
=== Early career (2015–2016) ===
In 2015, Bogojević trained to become a professional wrestler at the Mercury Pro Wrestling Academy in Arvada, Colorado. He wrestled under the ring name Dozer for several regional promotions in Colorado and Utah, including Ultra Championship Wrestling-Zero (UCW-Zero) and New Revolution Wrestling, where he won the NRW Charged Championship.

=== WWE ===
==== Heavy Machinery (2016–2020) ====
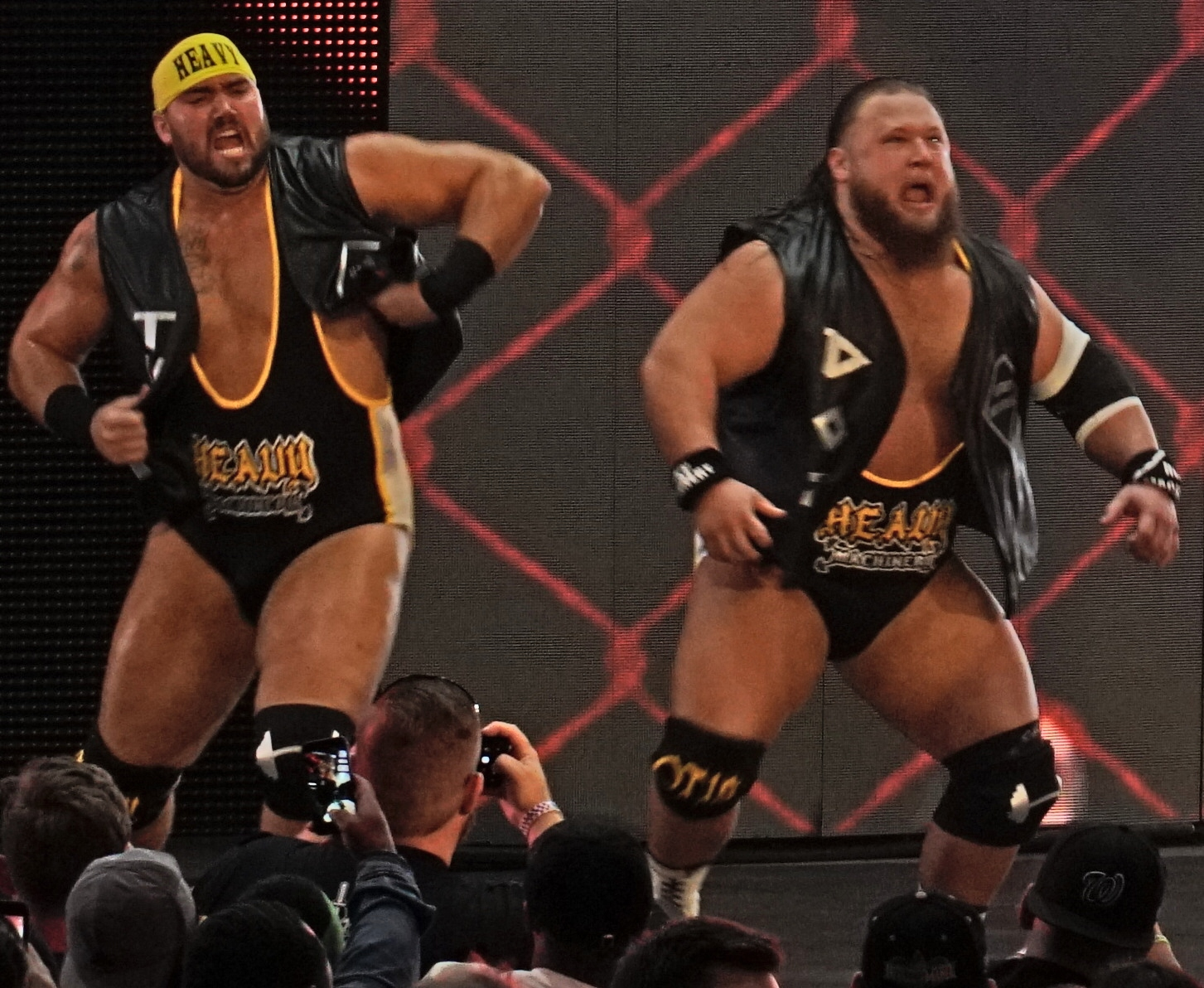
Heavy Machinery – Dozovic (right) and Tucker Knight (left) in April 2018

Bogojević was scouted by WWE scout Gerald Brisco, who specialized in scouting award-winning amateur wrestlers. On April 12, 2016, Bogojevic signed a contract with WWE and was assigned to the WWE Performance Center. He made his debut at a NXT house show on July 8, 2016, teaming with Adrian Jaoude in a loss to The Authors of Pain (Akam and Rezar).

During this time, he formed a tag team with Tucker Knight, calling themselves Heavy Machinery. In October, with Bogojević now renamed Otis Dozovic, the duo participated in the Dusty Rhodes Tag Team Classic tournament, and they made their television debut on the October 19 episode of NXT, losing to the team of Austin Aries and Roderick Strong. The duo returned and had their first televised victory on the March 29, 2017 episode of NXT, defeating the team of Jonathan Ortagun and Q. T. Marshall. On the July 12 episode of NXT, Heavy Machinery unsuccessfully challenged The Authors of Pain for the NXT Tag Team Championship. In March 2018, Heavy Machinery once again participated in the Dusty Rhodes Tag Team Classic tournament, but were eliminated by The Street Profits (Angelo Dawkins and Montez Ford) in the first round. On the December 19 episode of NXT, Heavy Machinery wrestled their final match on NXT, defeating Blake Howell and Danny D'Accardo.

On December 17, 2018, it was announced that Heavy Machinery would be debuting on the main roster. They debuted on the January 14, 2019 episode of Raw, interrupting an interview between Alexa Bliss and Paul Heyman. The following week on Raw, they defeated The Ascension (Konnor and Viktor) in their in-ring debut. In February, his ring name was shortened to Otis, while Knight's ring name was shortened to Tucker. The duo made their pay-per-view debut at WrestleMania 35 on April 7, where they both competed in the André the Giant Memorial Battle Royal, but neither would win the match. As part of the Superstar Shake-Up, Heavy Machinery was moved to the SmackDown brand. At Stomping Grounds on June 23, Heavy Machinery faced Daniel Bryan and Rowan for the SmackDown Tag Team Championship in a losing effort. At Extreme Rules on July 14, Heavy Machinery again competed for the titles in a triple threat tag team match involving Bryan and Rowan, and The New Day (Big E and Xavier Woods), which The New Day won. At Crown Jewel on October 31, Heavy Machinery competed in a tag team turmoil match, but were eliminated by The New Day. At Survivor Series on November 24, Heavy Machinery participated in an interbrand tag team battle royal, which was won by Dolph Ziggler and Robert Roode.

By the end of 2019, Otis entered a romantic storyline with Mandy Rose. On the February 14, 2020 episode of SmackDown, Otis went on a date with Rose, but Dolph Ziggler appeared in Otis's place during the date. The storyline evolved into a love triangle involving a feud between Otis and Ziggler over Rose. On the April 3 episode of SmackDown, it was revealed that Sonya Deville was working with Ziggler to keep Otis from Rose. On the second night of WrestleMania 36 on April 5, Otis defeated Ziggler with Rose's help, who kissed him after the match. On the May 1 episode of SmackDown, Otis defeated Ziggler to qualify for the Money in the Bank ladder match. At Money in the Bank on May 10, Otis won the Money in the Bank ladder match, earning him a world title match at the time of his choosing. On the September 11 episode of SmackDown, Otis and Tucker began a feud with John Morrison and the Miz after they stole the Money in the Bank briefcase from Otis, which was actually inside Otis' lunchbox. On the September 18 episode of SmackDown, Otis was sued by Miz and Morrison and was told to relinquish the contract, but Otis refused and opted to go to court instead.

As part of the 2020 Draft in October, Otis remained on SmackDown, while Tucker was drafted to the Raw brand, disbanding Heavy Machinery. However, on the October 19 episode of Raw, Otis tagged with Tucker but disguised under a mask and using the name El Gran Gordo. At Hell in a Cell on October 25, Otis lost his Money in the Bank briefcase to the Miz after Tucker betrayed him, hitting him with the briefcase.

==== Alpha Academy (2020–present) ====
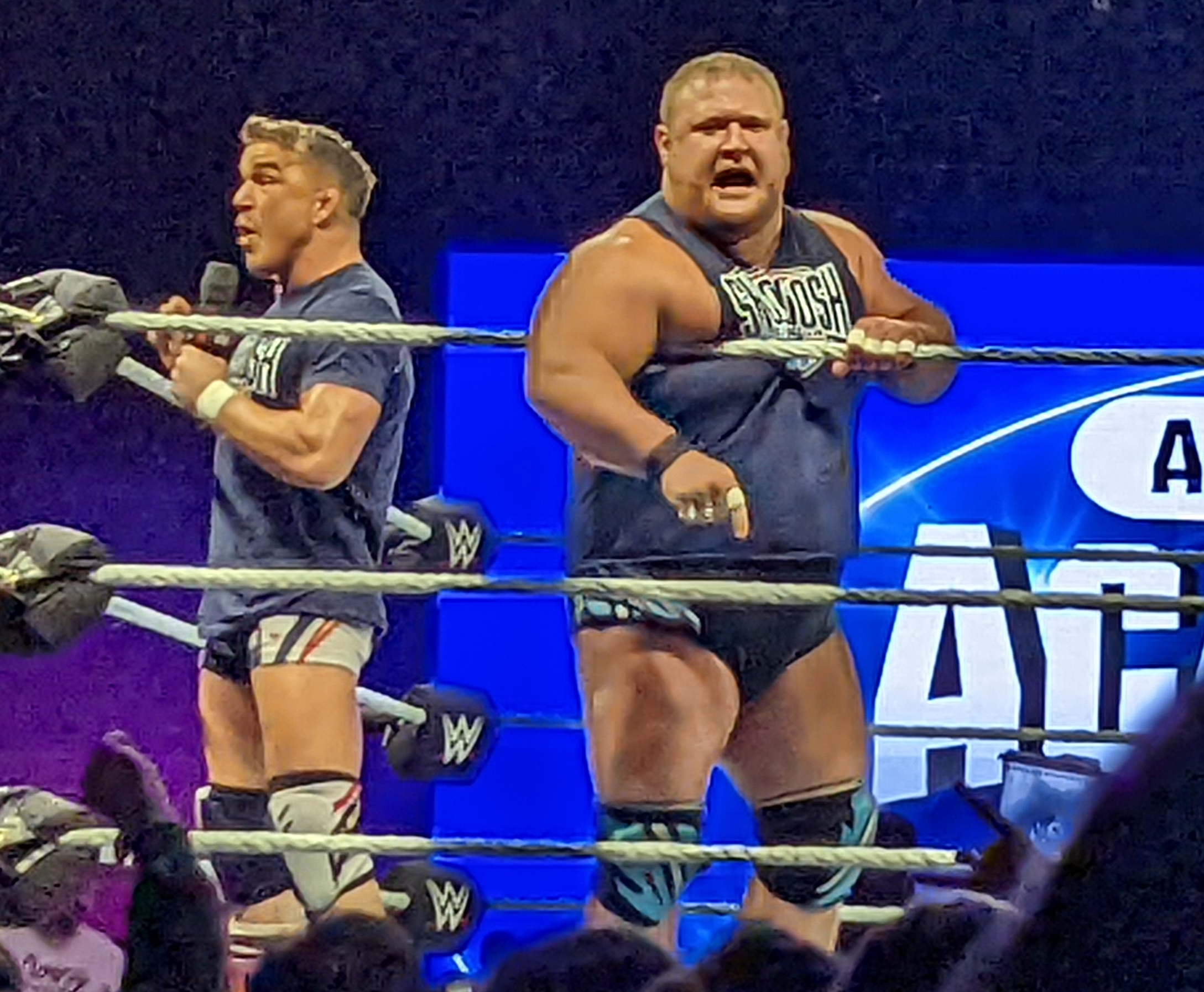
Alpha Academy (Chad Gable (left) and Otis (right)) in 2022

On the November 6 episode of SmackDown, Otis lost to Seth Rollins in a Survivor Series qualifying match. After Otis defeated Dolph Ziggler on the November 13 episode of SmackDown, he was confronted by Chad Gable, who proposed to Otis that he would help him discover his "Inner Alpha". On the November 20 episode of SmackDown, WWE Official Adam Pearce announced Otis as the final member of the Men's SmackDown Survivor Series team. At Survivor Series on November 22, Otis was eliminated by Braun Strowman, and Team SmackDown lost the match in a clean sweep. At TLC: Tables, Ladders and Chairs on December 20, Otis, Gable, Big E and Daniel Bryan defeated Shinsuke Nakamura, Cesaro, King Corbin and Intercontinental Champion Sami Zayn in an eight-man tag team match during the pre-show. At Royal Rumble on January 31, 2021, Otis competed in his first rumble match but was quickly eliminated by King Corbin.

On the February 19 episode of SmackDown, Otis attacked Rey Mysterio at the orders of Gable after their tag team match, turning heel for the first time in his career. At WrestleMania SmackDown on April 8, Alpha Academy challenged for the SmackDown Tag Team Championship in a fatal four-way match involving Rey & Dominik Mysterio and The Street Profits in a fatal four-way match, which saw the champions Dolph Ziggler and Robert Roode retain the titles. As part of the 2021 Draft, both Otis and Gable were drafted to the Raw brand. On the January 10, 2022, episode of Raw, Alpha Academy defeated RK-Bro (Randy Orton and Riddle) to win the Raw Tag Team Championship, marking Otis's first championship in his WWE career. On the March 7 episode of Raw, Alpha Academy dropped the titles back to RK-Bro in a triple threat match also involving Seth Rollins and Kevin Owens, ending their reign at 55 days. On the second night of WrestleMania 38 on April 3, Alpha Academy failed to regain the titles from RK-Bro in a triple threat match also involving The Street Profits.

On the March 13, 2023 episode of Raw, Gable found Otis backstage taking part in a photo shoot with Maximum Male Models (the team of ma.çé and mån.sôör, managed by Maxxine Dupri). Otis then decided to leave with Maximum Male Models instead of Gable. On the following episode of Raw, Otis accompanied Gable in Gable's match against Ricochet. Midway through the match, Maxxine walked out to bring Otis backstage. This would start a series of segments between Dupri and Gable where they both wanted Otis to be on their respective teams. Maxxine officially sided with the Alpha Academy on the May 15 episode of Raw when she cheered on Otis and Gable eliminating ma.çé and mån.sôör in the Intercontinental Championship number one contenders' battle royal match.

In the weeks that followed, Alpha Academy began to slowly turn face with their crowd reactions growing louder and louder. After weeks of training, Maxxine made her in-ring debut on the July 3 episode of Raw in a mixed six-person tag team match with Gable and Otis against The Viking Raiders (Erik, Ivar and Valhalla). Maxxine pinned Valhalla after performing a sunset flip on her. On the July 10 episode of Raw, Alpha Academy held a graduation ceremony for Dupri. At the end of the ceremony, Gable presented Dupri with her own Alpha Academy letterman's jacket. As Dupri was about to put on the jacket, The Viking Raiders appeared on the ramp to distract the team. Valhalla then attacked Dupri from behind and stole her jacket. In the following episode of Raw, Gable and Otis fought Erik and Ivar in a "Viking Rules" match. Despite dominating the match, Gable and Otis lost but Dupri managed to take back her jacket.

In April 2024, Gable turned heel after failing to win the Intercontinental Championship multiple times, with Gable assigning blame that he had spent too much time training his "loser" stablemates and declaring that the stable's focus is to win Gable the Intercontinental Championship. After weeks of mistreatment by Gable on the rest of the stable for not assisting him to win the title by cheating, Otis, Dupri and Akira Tozawa walked out of Gable on the June 17 episode of Raw, who in turn left Alpha Academy.

On the January 26, 2026 episode of Raw, Alpha Academy defeated New Day, Creed Brothers, and Los Americanos in a fatal four-way number one contenders match for the World Tag Team titles. On February 9, Alpha Academy was defeated in a title match by the reigning champions The Usos.

== Professional wrestling style and persona ==
During his storyline with Mandy Rose in 2020, Otis was shown as a shy man with problems when he talks to women, which Bogojevic admits is based on his real life personality.

Otis used The Caterpillar as a finishing maneuver during his matches when he was a babyface, which is very similar to Scotty 2 Hotty's finishing maneuver, The Worm. But after turning heel, he started using a Vader Bomb (corner slingshot splash) and a falling powerslam as his finishing maneuvers.

== Other media ==
=== Video games ===
Year	Title	Ref.
2018	WWE 2K19	
2019	WWE 2K20	
2020	WWE 2K Battlegrounds	
2022	WWE 2K22	
2023	WWE 2K23	
2024	WWE 2K24	
2025	WWE 2K25	
2026	WWE 2K26	

=== Filmography ===
Year	Title	Role	Notes
2020	The Main Event	Stinkface	

== Championships and accomplishments ==
- New Revolution Wrestling
  - NRW Charged Championship (1 time)
- Pro Wrestling Illustrated
  - Ranked No. 69 of the top 500 singles wrestlers in the PWI 500 in 2020
  - Rookie of the Year (2017)
- WWE
  - WWE Raw Tag Team Championship (1 time) – with Chad Gable
  - Men's Money in the Bank (2020)

Preceded by Brock Lesnar	Mr. Money in the Bank; May 2020	Succeeded by The Miz
