= Photoluminescence excitation =

Type of photoluminescence

Photoluminescence excitation (abbreviated PLE) is a specific type of photoluminescence and concerns the interaction between electromagnetic radiation and matter. It is used in spectroscopic measurements where the frequency of the excitation light is varied, and the luminescence is monitored at the typical emission frequency of the material being studied. Peaks in the PLE spectra often represent absorption lines of the material. PLE spectroscopy is a useful method to investigate the electronic level structure of materials with low absorption due to the superior signal-to-noise ratio of the method compared to absorption measurements.

== Physical process ==
In a quantum-mechanical description of matter, the electrons confined to a material (such as those in individual atoms, molecules or crystals) are limited to a discrete set of energy values. The ground state of such a material system is such that the most energetic electron has its minimal energy. In photoluminescence, energy is transferred from light incident on the material and absorbed to electrons. The light is absorbed in minimal "quanta" or "packets" of energy of the electromagnetic radiation called photons. The amount of energy carried by a photon is proportional to its frequency. The electron is then in an excited state of higher energy. Such states are not stable and with time the material system will return to its ground state and the electron will lose its energy. Luminescence is the process whereby light is emitted when the electron drops to a lower energy level.

Often when a photon is absorbed, the system is excited in the corresponding excited state, then it relaxes in an intermediate lower energy state, with a "non-radiative relaxation" (a relaxation that doesn't involve the emission of a photon, but e.g. involves the emission of vibrational energy) and then there is the emission of a photon with a lower energy than the absorbed one, because of the relaxation from the intermediate, lower energy state to the "ground state". Usually the strongest luminescence of the material is from the lower levels to the ground state. This process is called fluorescence. For instance, in semiconductors, most of the light emitted is at the frequency corresponding to the bandgap energy, i.e. from the bottom of the conduction band to the top of the valence band. In such systems, more light absorbed by the material, results in more electrons decaying non-radiatively to the lower states, and more luminescence in the emission wavelength.
