= Plé =

Plé is a French surname. Notable people with the surname include:

- Alfred Plé (1888–1980), French rower
- Christophe Plé (born 1966), French alpine skier
- Simone Plé-Caussade (1897–1986), French music pedagogue, composer, and pianist
