= Maxxine Dupri =

American professional wrestler (born 1997)

- Dupri in January 2026

Personal information
- Born: Sydney Jeannine Zmrzel; May 19, 1997 (age 29) Loomis, California, U.S.
- Spouse: Anthony Luke (m. 2025)

Professional wrestling career
- Ring name(s): Maxxine Dupri; Sofia Cromwell
- Billed height: 5 ft 8 in (173 cm)
- Billed weight: 135 lb (61 kg)
- Billed from: Sacramento, California
- Trained by: WWE Performance Center; Shawn Spears; Tyler Breeze; Tyson Kidd; Natalya
- Debut: July 3, 2023

Sydney Jeannine Luke (née Zmrzel; born May 19, 1997) is an American professional wrestler. She has been signed to WWE since August 2021, where she performs on the Raw brand under the ring name Maxxine Dupri. She is a member of The Vision stable, and is a former one-time WWE Women's Intercontinental Champion.

== Early life ==
Sydney Jeannine Zmrzel was born on May 19, 1997 in Loomis, California. Before her tenure with WWE, she was a cheerleader for the Los Angeles Rams, and has also been a dancer for the Phoenix Suns.

== Professional wrestling career ==
=== WWE ===
==== Managerial role (2021–2023) ====
In August 2021, Zmrzel participated in a WWE tryout in Las Vegas, Nevada, and became one of the 14 attendees to earn a contract with the company. She made her television debut on the November 16, 2021 episode of NXT, when she served as the poker dealer in the Poker Showdown segment between Cameron Grimes and Duke Hudson. From April to July 2022, Zmrzel, under the ring name Sofia Cromwell, managed Von Wagner.

On the July 22, 2022 episode of SmackDown, she made her main roster debut as Maxxine Dupri, Max Dupri's (kayfabe) sister and the Director of Talent for his heel Maximum Male Models stable consisting of ma.çé and mån.sôör. On the October 7 episode of SmackDown, Max would go on to leave the stable and re-establish himself as LA Knight, leaving her as the stable's manager. In February 2023, Maximum Male Models were moved to the Raw brand.

==== Alpha Academy (2023–2026) ====
Following the move to Raw, Dupri would begin a comedic storyline with Otis where she would attempt to recruit and encourage him to become a member of Maximum Male Models. This would later start a series of segments between Dupri and Chad Gable (Otis' tag team partner), where they both wanted Otis to be on their respective side. She eventually left Maximum Male Models and joined Alpha Academy, turning babyface for the first time in her career.

On the June 12 episode of Raw, Dupri performed an arm drag on Valhalla of The Viking Raiders and began her first feud. Otis and Gable trained Dupri in backstage segments to prepare for her in-ring debut. She debuted in a mixed tag team match between Alpha Academy and The Viking Raiders on the July 3 episode of Raw, where Alpha Academy won with Dupri pinning Valhalla. On the July 10 episode of Raw, Alpha Academy held a graduation ceremony for Dupri with Gable presenting Dupri her own Alpha Academy letterman's jacket at the end of the ceremony. As Dupri was about to put on the jacket, The Viking Raiders appeared on the ramp to distract Alpha Academy. Valhalla then attacked Dupri from behind and stole her jacket. In the following episode of Raw, Gable and Otis fought Erik and Ivar in a "Viking Rules" match. Despite dominating the match, Gable and Otis lost but Dupri managed to take her jacket back. On the July 31 episode of Raw, Dupri defeated Valhalla with a Japanese Ocean Cyclone Suplex in her debut singles match. On the November 6 episode of Raw, Dupri participated in the battle royal for a Women's World Championship match at Survivor Series but was eliminated by Nia Jax. Two weeks later, Dupri teamed up with Diamond Mine's Ivy Nile in a fatal-four way tag team match for a WWE Women's Tag Team Championship match in a losing effort. On December 5, Dupri had her first match in NXT where Gable, Otis and herself defeated The Meta-Four (Noam Dar, Oro Mensah and Lash Legend) in a six-person mixed tag team match. On the December 11 episode of Raw, Dupri faced the Women's World Champion Rhea Ripley in a non-title match where she was conclusively defeated by submission in just over two minutes. Dupri made her Royal Rumble match debut at the titular event on January 27, 2024, entering as the 18th entrant. She lasted over six minutes and was eliminated by eventual winner Bayley. On the April 22 episode of Raw, Dupri competed in her first title match in a battle royal for the vacated Women's World Championship. She managed to eliminate Candice LeRae and Indi Hartwell but was eliminated by Nia Jax and ultimately won by Becky Lynch. Around the same time, Gable turned heel after failing to win the Intercontinental Championship multiple times, with Gable assigning blame that he had spent too much time training his "loser" stablemates and declaring that the stable's focus is to win Gable the Intercontinental Championship. After weeks of mistreatment by Gable on the rest of the stable for not assisting him to win the title by cheating, Dupri, Otis and Akira Tozawa walked out on Gable on the June 17 episode of Raw. Gable subsequently formed the American Made stable with The Creed Brothers and Nile, who turned on Dupri.

In March 2025, Dupri formed a tag team with Natalya, later called "The Dungeon Dolls". The pair eventually teamed together on the April 11 episode of SmackDown, where they entered the tag team gauntlet match for a WWE Women's Championship match at WrestleMania 41 but were unsuccessful. After gaining victories over WWE Women's Intercontinental Champion Becky Lynch via count-out and disqualification, Dupri faced Lynch for the title on the November 17 episode of Raw. After a distraction by AJ Lee during the match, Dupri defeated Lynch for the title, earning her first championship.

On the January 5, 2026 episode of Raw, Dupri lost the title back to Lynch ending her reign at 49 days. Two weeks later on Raw, Dupri failed to regain the title after being betrayed by Natalya, disbanding The Dungeon Dolls. At the Royal Rumble on January 31, Dupri entered the match at #12 being eliminated by Lynch. Following the Royal Rumble, Dupri entered a feud with Natalya, who had undergone a character change since her heel turn and was now performing as Nattie. The first match between the two took place on the February 9 episode of Raw, ending in a double countout after Nattie trapped Dupri in the Sharpshooter on the announce table. Security, producers, and eventually AJ Lee had to intervene to free Dupri.

A rematch on the February 23 episode of Raw saw Dupri knocked limp and unconscious after being driven head-first into the ring post. Nattie then continued repeated unprotected strikes to the back of Dupri's head, resulting in a victory for Nattie via referee stoppage. The feud culminated on the March 16 episode of Raw, where Nattie defeated Dupri cleanly via submission.

==== The Vision (2026–present) ====
Starting in March 2026, Dupri was spotted talking to Austin Theory backstage on multiple occasions. On the July 6 episode of Raw, Dupri helped The Vision's Theory and Bron Breakker win the World Tag Team Championships, turning heel for the first time since 2023. After the match, Dupri kissed Theory, officially becoming an on-screen couple and joining The Vision. On the July 13 episode of Raw, Dupri and the rest of The Vision attacked Otis and Tozawa, cementing her heel turn.

== Other media ==
=== Video games ===
Maxxine Dupri in video games
| Year | Title | Notes | Ref. |
|---|---|---|---|
| 2024 | WWE 2K24 | Video game debut | |
| 2025 | WWE 2K25 | | |
| 2026 | WWE 2K26 | | |

=== Filmography ===
| Year | Title | Role | Notes |
|---|---|---|---|
| 2021 | Notorious Nick | Ring Girl 4 | |
| 2021 | Below Deck Mediterranean | Herself; guest | 2 episodes |
| 2025 | WWE LFG | Herself | 2 episodes |

== Personal life ==
Zmrzel has her own clothing boutique, Jaunty, which was established in the winter of 2019 when she was 22 years old. She stated that The Bella Twins and the reality show Total Divas inspired her to pursue a professional wrestling career.

Zmrzel's older brother, Wyatt, who had the rare genetic condition adrenoleukodystrophy (ALD), was killed in 2017 when the Lyft vehicle he was riding in crashed into another vehicle.

On December 23, 2024, Zmrzel announced her engagement to fellow professional wrestler Anthony Luke. The couple were married on December 31, 2025, in Naples, Florida.

== Championships and accomplishments ==
- Wrestling Observer Newsletter
  - Worst Gimmick (2022) as part of Maximum Male Models
- WWE
  - WWE Women's Intercontinental Championship (1 time)
