= WWE in Canada =

History of professional wrestling

- Created by: Vince McMahon
- Promotions: WWE
- Brands: Raw; SmackDown; NXT

WWE (formerly World Wrestling Federation), an American professional wrestling promotion based in Stamford, Connecticut in the United States owned by TKO, previously the McMahon family, has been promoting events in Canada since its founding in 1980.

== History ==
On January 24, 1963, Toots Mondt of the Capitol Wrestling Corporation (CWC) got into a dispute with the National Wrestling Alliance (NWA) over "Nature Boy" Buddy Rogers losing the NWA World Heavyweight Championship to Lou Thesz in a one-fall match in Toronto, Ontario, Canada. This disagreement led to Mondt, McMahon, and the CWC leaving the NWA in protest, creating the World Wide Wrestling Federation (the predecessor to the WWE) in the process.

In 1984 Vince McMahon purchased Stampede Wrestling, before selling it back the following year. Also in 1984, WWF acquired Maple Leaf Wrestling, and continued to run it for a couple of years. In 1986 Maple Leaf Wrestling was shut down, and the name was used for the Canadian broadcasts of WWF Superstars of Wrestling.

In 1985 WWF created the WWF Canadian Championship, which was given to Dino Bravo. Bravo was the Canadian International Heavyweight Championship for many years for Lutte Internationale. Due to his previous success, Bravo was billed as the WWF Canadian Champion in some Canadian cities until January 1986, when the title was abandoned.

In 1986 WWF hosted The Big Event in Toronto which drew over 74,000 fans. Ten years later, the WWF held an anniversary show of The Big Event, WWF Xperience, which drew over 21,000 fans.

In 1988, the inaugural Royal Rumble was held at Copps Coliseum in Hamilton.

In 1997 Survivor Series was broadcast from Montreal and is infamous for the Montreal Screwjob.

WrestleMania X8 in 2002 set the attendance record for an indoor event in Canada, that being 68,236 people at the SkyDome.

In 2019, Montreal hosted the 2019 WWE Superstar Shake-up.

== Broadcast ==
Starting in the mid to late 1990s, WWF/E programming was shown on TSN for Monday Night Raw and The Score for SmackDown! broadcasts. The programs were also aired on CHCH Hamilton, CJNT Montreal, CKMI Quebec and CKVR Barrie. ECW and NXT were seen on Global Television Network until 2010.

Beginning in 2014, WWE content is distributed exclusively via Rogers Media. As part of this agreement, Rogers distributes WWE's weekly television shows, Raw, SmackDown, NXT, Main Event, and This Week in WWE on Sportsnet 360. This deal excludes reality series, such as Total Divas (which is produced for E! and shown on its Canadian counterpart owned by Bell Media).

As part of this deal, the WWE Network's live stream was offered as a traditional TV channel for subscribers to cable providers, instead of a standalone service.

On September 7, 2017, WWE and TVA Sports announced a multi-year agreement to air a weekly recap of Raw in French.

Beginning January 1, 2025, all the Canadian rights to its weekly series Raw, and rights to all other programming (including content currently associated with the WWE Network), would move to Netflix in stages. Netflix and WWE confirmed on January 23, 2024 that the Canadian rights to Raw would move in January 2025—aligning with Rogers' contract having been previously announced as ending in 2024, and suggesting that other Canadian rights would move at the same time.

From 2019 to 2024, SmackDown aired on Fox which is available to Canadian providers. Since 2024, NXT also airs on The CW, that is also available for distribution in Canada. In addition, Saturday Night's Main Event aired on NBC which is also available to Canadian providers, but during its first revived run from 2006 to 2008, it was simulcasted on Global and Citytv while A&E (also available in Canada) airs a two-hour reality and documentary-based programming part of the seasonal WWE Superstar Sundays: LFG and Rivals, which also appears on the USA Network (formerly Discovery Channel); as this channel airs Collision, produced by rival promotion All Elite Wrestling.

== Pay-per-view and livestreaming events ==
| Date | Event | Venue | Location | Final match | Ref |
|---|---|---|---|---|---|
| April 1, 1990 | WrestleMania VI | SkyDome | Toronto, Ontario | Hulk Hogan (World-c) vs. The Ultimate Warrior (IC-c) in a Winner Takes All match for the WWF World Heavyweight Championship and WWF Intercontinental Championship | |
| October 22, 1995 | In Your House 4 | Winnipeg Arena | Winnipeg, Manitoba | Diesel (c) vs. The British Bulldog for the WWF World Heavyweight Championship | |
| July 21, 1996 | In Your House 9: International Incident | General Motors Place | Vancouver, British Columbia | Shawn Michaels, Sycho Sid, and Ahmed Johnson vs. Camp Cornette (Vader, The British Bulldog (2), and Owen Hart) in a six-man tag team match | |
| July 6, 1997 | In Your House 16: Canadian Stampede | Canadian Airlines Saddledome | Calgary, Alberta | Stone Cold Steve Austin, Ken Shamrock, Goldust, and The Legion Of Doom (Hawk and Animal) vs. The Hart Foundation (Bret Hart, Owen Hart (2), The British Bulldog (3), Jim Neidhart, and Brian Pillman) in a ten-man tag team match | |
| November 9, 1997 | Survivor Series | Molson Centre | Montreal, Quebec | Bret Hart (2) (c) vs. Shawn Michaels (2) for the WWF World Heavyweight Championship | |
| September 27, 1998 | Breakdown: In Your House | Copps Coliseum | Hamilton, Ontario | Stone Cold Steve Austin (2) (c) vs. The Undertaker vs. Kane in a triple threat match for the WWF Championship | |
| December 13, 1998 | Rock Bottom: In Your House | General Motors Place | Vancouver, British Columbia | Stone Cold Steve Austin (3) vs. The Undertaker (2) in a Buried Alive match | |
| March 17, 2002 | WrestleMania X8 | SkyDome | Toronto, Ontario | Chris Jericho (c) vs. Triple H for the Undisputed WWF Championship | |
| February 23, 2003 | No Way Out | Bell Centre | Montreal, Quebec | Hulk Hogan (2) vs. The Rock | |
| April 18, 2004 | Backlash | Rexall Place | Edmonton, Alberta | Chris Benoit (c) vs. Shawn Michaels (3) vs. Triple H (2) in a triple threat match for the World Heavyweight Championship | |
| August 15, 2004 | SummerSlam | Air Canada Centre | Toronto, Ontario | Chris Benoit (2) (c) vs. Randy Orton for the World Heavyweight Championship | |
| September 17, 2006 | Unforgiven | Air Canada Centre | Toronto, Ontario | Edge (c) vs. John Cena in a Tables, Ladders, and Chairs match for the WWE Championship | |
| September 13, 2009 | Breaking Point | Bell Centre | Montreal, Quebec | CM Punk (c) vs. The Undertaker (3) in a submission match for the World Heavyweight Championship | |
| March 12, 2016 | Roadblock | Ricoh Coliseum | Toronto, Ontario | Triple H (3) (c) vs. Dean Ambrose for the WWE World Heavyweight Championship | |
| November 19, 2016 | NXT TakeOver: Toronto | Air Canada Centre | Toronto, Ontario | Shinsuke Nakamura (c) vs. Samoa Joe for the NXT Championship | |
| November 20, 2016 | Survivor Series | Air Canada Centre | Toronto, Ontario | Goldberg vs. Brock Lesnar | |
| August 10, 2019 | NXT TakeOver: Toronto | Scotiabank Arena | Toronto, Ontario | Adam Cole (c) vs. Johnny Gargano in a Three Stages of Hell match (singles match, street fight, and barbed wire steel cage match) for the NXT Championship | |
| August 11, 2019 | SummerSlam | Scotiabank Arena | Toronto, Ontario | Brock Lesnar (2) (c) vs. Seth Rollins for the WWE Universal Championship | |
| February 18, 2023 | Elimination Chamber | Bell Centre | Montreal, Quebec | Roman Reigns (c) vs. Sami Zayn for the Undisputed WWE Universal Championship | |
| July 6, 2024 | Money in the Bank | Scotiabank Arena | Toronto, Ontario | Cody Rhodes, Randy Orton (2), and Kevin Owens vs. The Bloodline/MFT (Solo Sikoa, Tama Tonga, and Jacob Fatu) in a six-man tag team match | |
| July 7, 2024 | NXT Heatwave | Scotiabank Arena | Toronto, Ontario | Trick Williams (c) vs. Je'Von Evans vs. Ethan Page vs. Shawn Spears in a fatal four-way match for the NXT Championship | |
| November 30, 2024 | Survivor Series: WarGames | Rogers Arena | Vancouver, British Columbia | The OG Bloodline (Roman Reigns (2), The Usos (Jey Uso and Jimmy Uso), Sami Zayn (2)), and CM Punk (2) vs. The Bloodline/MFT (Solo Sikoa (2), Jacob Fatu (2), Tama Tonga (2), and Tonga Loa), and Bronson Reed in a WarGames match | |
| March 1, 2025 | Elimination Chamber | Rogers Centre | Toronto, Ontario | John Cena (2) vs. CM Punk (3) vs. Drew McIntyre vs. Logan Paul vs. Damian Priest vs. Seth "Freakin" Rollins (2) in a six-man Elimination Chamber match for an Undisputed WWE Championship match at WrestleMania 41 | |
| January 24, 2026 | Saturday Night's Main Event XLIII | Bell Centre | Montreal, Quebec | Randy Orton (3) vs. Trick Williams (2) vs. Damian Priest (2) vs. Sami Zayn (3) in a Fatal four-way match to determine the #1 contender for the Undisputed WWE Championship at the Royal Rumble | |

== Weekly Television shows ==
=== 1995–2000 ===
| Date | Name | Brand | Venue | City | Notes |
|---|---|---|---|---|---|
| October 23, 1995 | Raw | | | Brandon, Manitoba | |
| October 23, 1995; Aired October 30, 1995 | Raw | | | Brandon, Manitoba | |
| October 23, 1995; Aired November 6, 1995 | Raw | | | Brandon, Manitoba | |
| October 23, 1995; Aired November 13, 1995 | Raw | | | Brandon, Manitoba | |
| January 31, 1997; Aired February 3, 1997 | Raw | | SkyDome | Toronto, Ontario | This was the first 2-hour Raw |
| July 7, 1997 | Raw | | Edmonton Coliseum | Edmonton, Alberta | |
| July 21, 1997 | Raw | | Halifax Metro Centre | Halifax, Nova Scotia | Hart Foundation (Bret Hart, Owen Hart and The British Bulldog VS "Stone Cold" Steve Austin, Dude Love and The Undertaker in a six-man tag Flag match |
| November 10, 1997 | Raw | | Corel Centre | Ottawa, Ontario | |
| November 11, 1997; Aired November 17, 1997 | Raw | | Cornwall Civic Complex | Cornwall, Ontario | |
| February 8, 1999; Aired February 13, 1999 | Raw | | SkyDome | Toronto, Ontario | |
| May 29, 2000 | Raw | | General Motors Place | Vancouver, British Columbia | |

=== 2001–2010 ===
| Date | Name | Brand | Venue | City | Notes |
|---|---|---|---|---|---|
| May 28, 2001 | Raw | - | Pengrowth Saddledome | Calgary, Alberta | |
| May 29, 2001; Aired May 31, 2001 | SmackDown! | - | Skyreach Centre | Edmonton, Alberta | |
| September 3, 2001 | Raw | - | Air Canada Centre | Toronto, Ontario | |
| September 4, 2001 | SmackDown! | - | Air Canada Centre | Toronto, Ontario | Special Tuesday live broadcast |
| October 15, 2001 | Raw | - | Corel Centre | Ottawa, Ontario | |
| October 16, 2001; Aired October 18, 2001 | SmackDown! | - | Molson Centre | Montreal, Quebec | |
| March 18, 2002 | Raw | - | Molson Centre | Montreal, Quebec | |
| March 19, 2002; Aired March 21, 2002 | SmackDown! | - | Corel Centre | Ottawa, Ontario | |
| May 13, 2002 | Raw | Raw | Air Canada Centre | Toronto, Ontario | |
| May 14, 2002; Aired May 16, 2002 | SmackDown! | SmackDown! | Bell Centre | Montreal, Quebec | |
| May 27, 2002 | Raw | Raw | Skyreach Centre | Edmonton, Alberta | |
| May 28, 2002; Aired May 30, 2002 | SmackDown! | SmackDown! | Pengrowth Saddledome | Calgary, Alberta | |
| October 14, 2002 | Raw | Raw | Bell Centre | Montreal, Quebec | |
| October 15, 2002; Aired October 17, 2002 | SmackDown! | SmackDown! | Air Canada Centre | Toronto, Ontario | |
| February 24, 2003 | Raw | Raw | Air Canada Centre | Toronto, Ontario | |
| February 25, 2003; Aired February 27, 2003 | SmackDown! | SmackDown! | John Labatt Centre | London, Ontario | |
| May 5, 2003 | Raw | Raw | Halifax Metro Centre | Halifax, Nova Scotia | |
| May 6, 2003; Aired May 8, 2003 | SmackDown! | SmackDown! | Halifax Metro Centre | Halifax, Nova Scotia | |
| July 7, 2003 | Raw | Raw | Bell Centre | Montreal, Quebec | |
| July 8, 2003; Aired July 10, 2003 | SmackDown! | SmackDown! | Air Canada Centre | Toronto, Ontario | |
| August 4, 2003 | Raw | Raw | PNE Coliseum | Vancouver, British Columbia | |
| August 5, 2003; Aired August 7, 2003 | SmackDown! | SmackDown! | Prospera Place | Kelowna, British Columbia | |
| April 19, 2004 | Raw | Raw | Pengrowth Saddledome | Calgary, Alberta | |
| April 20, 2004; Aired April 22, 2004 | SmackDown! | SmackDown! | Prospera Place | Kelowna, British Columbia | |
| May 31, 2004 | Raw | Raw | Bell Centre | Montreal, Quebec | |
| June 1, 2004; Aired June 3, 2004 | SmackDown! | SmackDown! | Air Canada Centre | Toronto, Ontario | |
| July 5, 2004 | Raw | Raw | Winnipeg Arena | Winnipeg, Manitoba | |
| July 6, 2004; Aired July 8, 2004 | SmackDown! | SmackDown! | Winnipeg Arena | Winnipeg, Manitoba | |
| August 16, 2004 | Raw | Raw | John Labatt Centre | London, Ontario | |
| August 17, 2004; Aired August 19, 2004 | SmackDown! | SmackDown! | Copps Coliseum | Hamilton, Ontario | |
| January 17, 2005 | Raw | Raw | Air Canada Centre | Toronto, Ontario | |
| January 18, 2005; Aired January 20, 2005 | SmackDown! | SmackDown! | Bell Centre | Montreal, Quebec | |
| May 30, 2005 | Raw | Raw | Pengrowth Saddledome | Calgary, Alberta | |
| May 31, 2005; Aired June 2, 2005 | SmackDown! | SmackDown! | Rexall Place | Edmonton, Alberta | |
| August 15, 2005 | Raw | Raw | Bell Centre | Montreal, Quebec | |
| August 16, 2005; Aired August 18, 2005 | SmackDown! | SmackDown! | Air Canada Centre | Toronto, Ontario | |
| September 18, 2006 | Raw | Raw | Bell Centre | Montreal, Quebec | |
| September 18, 2006; Aired September 22, 2006 | SmackDown! | SmackDown! | Bell Centre | Montreal, Quebec | First episode to air on The CW |
| May 28, 2007 | Raw | Raw | Air Canada Centre | Toronto, Ontario | |
| May 29, 2007 | ECW | ECW | John Labatt Centre | London, Ontario | |
| May 29, 2007; Aired June 1, 2007 | SmackDown! | SmackDown! | John Labatt Centre | London, Ontario | |
| May 5, 2008 | Raw | Raw | Air Canada Centre | Toronto, Ontario | |
| May 6, 2008 | ECW | ECW | John Labatt Centre | London, Ontario | |
| May 6, 2008; Aired May 9, 2008 | SmackDown | SmackDown | John Labatt Centre | London, Ontario | |
| December 22, 2008 | Raw | Raw | Air Canada Centre | Toronto, Ontario | |
| December 22, 2008; Aired December 26, 2008 | SmackDown | SmackDown | Air Canada Centre | Toronto, Ontario | |
| August 10, 2009 | Raw | Raw | Pengrowth Saddledome | Calgary, Alberta | |
| August 11, 2009 | ECW | ECW | Rexall Place | Edmonton, Alberta | |
| August 11, 2009; Aired August 14, 2009 | SmackDown | SmackDown | Rexall Place | Edmonton, Alberta | |
| September 14, 2009 | Raw | Raw | Air Canada Centre | Toronto, Ontario | |
| September 15, 2009 | ECW | ECW | Copps Coliseum | Hamilton, Ontario | |
| September 15, 2009; Aired September 18, 2009 | SmackDown | SmackDown | Copps Coliseum | Hamilton, Ontario | |
| May 17, 2010 | Raw | Raw | Air Canada Centre | Toronto, Ontario | |
| May 18, 2010; Aired May 21, 2010 | SmackDown | SmackDown | Scotiabank Place | Ottawa, Ontario | |
| October 18, 2010 | Raw | Raw | Scotiabank Saddledome | Calgary, Alberta | |
| October 19, 2010; Aired October 22, 2010 | SmackDown | SmackDown | Rexall Place | Edmonton, Alberta | |

=== 2011–2020 ===
| Date | Name | Brand | Venue | City | Final match (televised) | Notes |
|---|---|---|---|---|---|---|
| August 22, 2011 | Raw | Raw | Rexall Place | Edmonton, Alberta | John Cena vs. CM Punk to determine the #1 contender for the WWE Championship at Night of Champions | Final Raw of the first brand extension. |
| August 23, 2011; Aired August 26, 2011 | SmackDown | SmackDown | Scotiabank Saddledome | Calgary, Alberta | Sheamus vs. Mark Henry | Final SmackDown of the first brand extension. |
| September 12, 2011 | Raw | - | Scotiabank Place | Ottawa, Ontario | Cody Rhodes vs. Randy Orton | |
| September 13, 2011; Aired September 16, 2011 | SmackDown | - | Air Canada Centre | Toronto, Ontario | R-Truth vs. Evan Bourne | |
| September 10, 2012 | Raw | - | Bell Centre | Montreal, Quebec | Cody Rhodes vs. Rey Mysterio | |
| September 11, 2012; Aired September 14, 2012 | SmackDown | - | Scotiabank Place | Ottawa, Ontario | Sheamus vs. Daniel Bryan | |
| May 27, 2013 | Raw | - | Scotiabank Saddledome | Calgary, Alberta | Curtis Axel vs. John Cena | Bret Hart appreciation night |
| May 28, 2013; Aired May 31, 2013 | SmackDown | - | Rexall Place | Edmonton, Alberta | Randy Orton vs. Dean Ambrose | |
| September 9, 2013 | Raw | - | Air Canada Centre | Toronto, Ontario | Daniel Bryan vs. Dean Ambrose | |
| September 10, 2013; Aired September 13, 2013 | SmackDown | - | Canadian Tire Centre | Ottawa, Ontario | The Shield (Dean Ambrose, Seth Rollins & Roman Reigns) vs. Dolph Ziggler, Jey Uso & Jimmy Uso in a six-man tag team match | |
| July 7, 2014 | Raw | - | Bell Centre | Montreal, Quebec | John Cena vs. Seth Rollins | |
| July 8, 2014; Aired July 11, 2014 | SmackDown | - | Canadian Tire Centre | Ottawa, Ontario | Roman Reigns vs. Rusev | |
| May 4, 2015 | Raw | - | Bell Centre | Montreal, Quebec | Randy Orton vs. Roman Reigns | |
| May 5, 2015; Aired May 7, 2015 | SmackDown | - | Canadian Tire Centre | Ottawa, Ontario | Lucha Dragons (Kalisto & Sin Cara) vs. Los Matadores (Diego & Fernando) in a tag team match | |
| November 21, 2016 | Raw | Raw | Air Canada Centre | Toronto, Ontario | Kevin Owens (c) vs. Seth Rollins in a no disqualification match for the WWE Universal Championship | |
| November 22, 2016 | SmackDown | SmackDown | Canadian Tire Centre | Ottawa, Ontario | James Ellsworth vs. AJ Styles in a ladder match | |
| August 7, 2017 | Raw | Raw | Air Canada Centre | Toronto, Ontario | Braun Strowman vs. Roman Reigns in a Last Man Standing match | |
| August 8, 2017 | SmackDown | SmackDown | Air Canada Centre | Toronto, Ontario | Randy Orton vs. Jinder Mahal | |
| April 30, 2018 | Raw | Raw | Bell Centre | Montreal, Quebec | Seth Rollins (c) vs. Finn Balor for the WWE Intercontinental Championship | |
| May 1, 2018 | SmackDown | SmackDown | Bell Centre | Montreal, Quebec | Charlotte Flair, Becky Lynch & Asuka vs. Billie Kay, Peyton Royce & Carmella in a six-woman tag team match | |
| August 27, 2018 | Raw | Raw | Scotiabank Arena | Toronto, Ontario | Braun Strowman & Roman Reigns vs. Dolph Ziggler & Drew McIntyre in a tag team match | |
| August 28, 2018 | SmackDown | SmackDown | Scotiabank Arena | Toronto, Ontario | Charlotte Flair (c) vs. Carmella for the WWE SmackDown Women's Championship | |
| April 15, 2019 | Raw | Raw | Bell Centre | Montreal, Quebec | AJ Styles, Seth Rollins & Roman Reigns vs. Bobby Lashley, Drew McIntyre & Baron Corbin in a six-man tag team match | 2019 WWE Superstar Shake-up |
| April 16, 2019 | SmackDown | SmackDown | Bell Centre | Montreal, Quebec | Kofi Kingston, Xavier Woods & Kevin Owens vs. Cesaro, Rusev & Shinsuke Nakamura in a six-man tag team match | 2019 WWE Superstar Shake-up |
| August 12, 2019 | Raw | Raw | Scotiabank Arena | Toronto, Ontario | Seth Rollins vs. AJ Styles | |
| August 13, 2019 | SmackDown | SmackDown | Scotiabank Arena | Toronto, Ontario | Randy Orton, Dash Wilder & Scott Dawson vs. The New Day (Kofi Kingston, Big E & Xavier Woods) | |
| February 14, 2020 | SmackDown | SmackDown | Rogers Arena | Vancouver, British Columbia | Daniel Bryan & Roman Reigns vs. The Miz & John Morrison in a tag team match | First time back at Rogers Arena since May 2000 after a reported ban and first non-house show in Vancouver since 2003 |
| February 24, 2020 | Raw | Raw | Bell MTS Place | Winnipeg, Manitoba | Randy Orton vs. Kevin Owens | First time ever hosting at this arena and first time back in Winnipeg since 2004 |

=== 2022–present ===
| Date | Name | Brand | Venue | City | Final match (televised) | Notes |
|---|---|---|---|---|---|---|
| August 19, 2022 | SmackDown | SmackDown | Bell Centre | Montreal, Quebec | Liv Morgan vs. Shotzi | |
| August 22, 2022 | Raw | Raw | Scotiabank Arena | Toronto, Ontario | Edge vs. Damian Priest | |
| September 26, 2022 | Raw | Raw | Rogers Place | Edmonton, Alberta | Matt Riddle vs. Damian Priest | First non-house show in Edmonton or Alberta since 2013 |
| September 30, 2022 | SmackDown | SmackDown | Canada Life Centre | Winnipeg, Manitoba | Kevin Owens, Johnny Gargano & Drew McIntyre vs. Otis, Chad Gable & Austin Theory in a six-man tag team match | |
| February 17, 2023 | SmackDown | SmackDown | Bell Centre | Montreal, Quebec | Gunther (c) vs. Madcap Moss for the WWE Intercontinental Championship | |
| February 20, 2023 | Raw | Raw | Canadian Tire Centre | Ottawa, Ontario | Austin Theory (c) vs. Edge for the WWE United States Championship | First non-house show in Ottawa since 2016 |
| August 11, 2023 | SmackDown | SmackDown | Scotiabank Saddledome | Calgary, Alberta | Austin Theory (c) vs. Rey Mysterio for the WWE United States Championship | First non-house show in Calgary since 2013 |
| August 14, 2023 | Raw | Raw | Canada Life Centre | Winnipeg, Manitoba | Cody Rhodes vs. Finn Balor | |
| August 18, 2023 | SmackDown | SmackDown | Scotiabank Arena | Toronto, Ontario | Edge vs. Sheamus | |
| August 21, 2023 | Raw | Raw | Centre Vidéotron | Quebec City, Quebec | Cody Rhodes, Kevin Owens & Sami Zayn vs. The Judgment Day (Dominik Mysterio, Finn Balor & Damian Priest) in a six-man tag team match | First WWE televised show in history to be held in Quebec City |
| January 5, 2024 | SmackDown: New Year's Revolution | SmackDown | Rogers Arena | Vancouver, British Columbia | Randy Orton vs. AJ Styles vs. LA Knight in a triple threat match to determine the #1 contender for the Undisputed WWE Universal Championship at the Royal Rumble | |
| April 15, 2024 | Raw | Raw | Bell Centre | Montreal, Quebec | Sami Zayn (c) vs. Chad Gable for the WWE Intercontinental Championship | |
| July 5, 2024 | SmackDown | SmackDown | Scotiabank Arena | Toronto, Ontario | A-Town Down Under (Austin Theory & Grayson Waller) (c) vs. DIY (Tommaso Ciampa & Johnny Gargano) for the WWE Tag Team Championship | |
| July 8, 2024 | Raw | Raw | Canadian Tire Centre | Ottawa, Ontario | Dominik Mysterio & Liv Morgan vs. Latino World Order (Zelina Vega & Rey Mysterio) in a mixed tag team match | |
| September 6, 2024 | SmackDown | SmackDown | Rogers Place | Edmonton, Alberta | The Bloodline/MFT (Solo Sikoa, Tama Tonga, Jacob Fatu & Tonga Loa) vs. Tommaso Ciampa, Johnny Gargano, Angelo Dawkins & Montez Ford in an eight-man tag team match | Last episode to air on Fox |
| September 9, 2024 | Raw | Raw | Scotiabank Saddledome | Calgary, Alberta | Jey Uso vs. Braun Strowman vs. Ilja Dragunov vs. Pete Dunne in a fatal 4-way match to determine the #1 contender for the WWE Intercontinental Championship | |
| February 28, 2025 | SmackDown | SmackDown | Scotiabank Arena | Toronto, Ontario | LA Knight vs. Carmelo Hayes vs. Jacob Fatu in a triple threat match to determine the #1 contender for the WWE United States Championship | |
| August 8, 2025 | SmackDown | SmackDown | Bell Centre | Montreal, Quebec | John Cena & Cody Rhodes vs. Drew McIntyre & Logan Paul in a tag team match | |
| August 11, 2025 | Raw | Raw | Centre Vidéotron | Quebec City, Quebec | CM Punk & LA Knight vs. The Vision (Bron Breakker & Bronson Reed) in a tag team match | |
| January 23, 2026 | SmackDown | SmackDown | Bell Centre | Montreal, Quebec | Trick Williams vs. Damian Priest | |
| January 26, 2026 | Raw | Raw | Scotiabank Arena | Toronto, Ontario | CM Punk (c) vs. AJ Styles for the World Heavyweight Championship | |
| August 21, 2026 | SmackDown | SmackDown | Scotiabank Arena | Toronto, Ontario | CM Punk (c) vs. Kevin Owens for the Undisputed WWE Championship | |
| August 24, 2026 | Raw | Raw | Canadian Tire Centre | Ottawa, Ontario | LA Knight & Solo Sikoa vs. The Usos (Jey Uso & Jimmy Uso) in a tag team match | |
| August 24, 2026; Aired August 28, 2026 | SmackDown | SmackDown | Canadian Tire Centre | Ottawa, Ontario | Finn Balor vs. Gunther vs. Kevin Owens in a triple threat match to determine the #1 contender for the Undisputed WWE Championship | |
