= NXT TakeOver: XXV =

2019 WWE Network event

- Promotional poster featuring Johnny Gargano, Adam Cole, Shayna Baszler, and Io Shirai
- Promotion: WWE
- Brand: NXT
- Date: June 1, 2019
- City: Bridgeport, Connecticut
- Venue: Webster Bank Arena

WWE event chronology
← Previous; Money in the Bank	Next → Super ShowDown

NXT TakeOver chronology
← Previous; New York	Next → Toronto

NXT TakeOver: XXV was a 2019 professional wrestling livestreaming event produced by WWE, held exclusively for wrestlers from the promotion's developmental brand, NXT. It was the 25th NXT TakeOver event and took place on June 1, 2019, at the Webster Bank Arena in Bridgeport, Connecticut. The event aired exclusively on the WWE Network.

Seven matches were contested at the event, including two taped for the following week's episode of NXT. In the main event, Adam Cole defeated Johnny Gargano to win the NXT Championship. The undercard saw NXT Women's Champion Shayna Baszler and NXT North American Champion Velveteen Dream defeating Io Shirai and Tyler Breeze, respectively, to retain their titles, and The Street Profits (Angelo Dawkins and Montez Ford) won the vacant NXT Tag Team Championship in a fatal four-way tag team ladder match.

== Production ==
=== Background ===
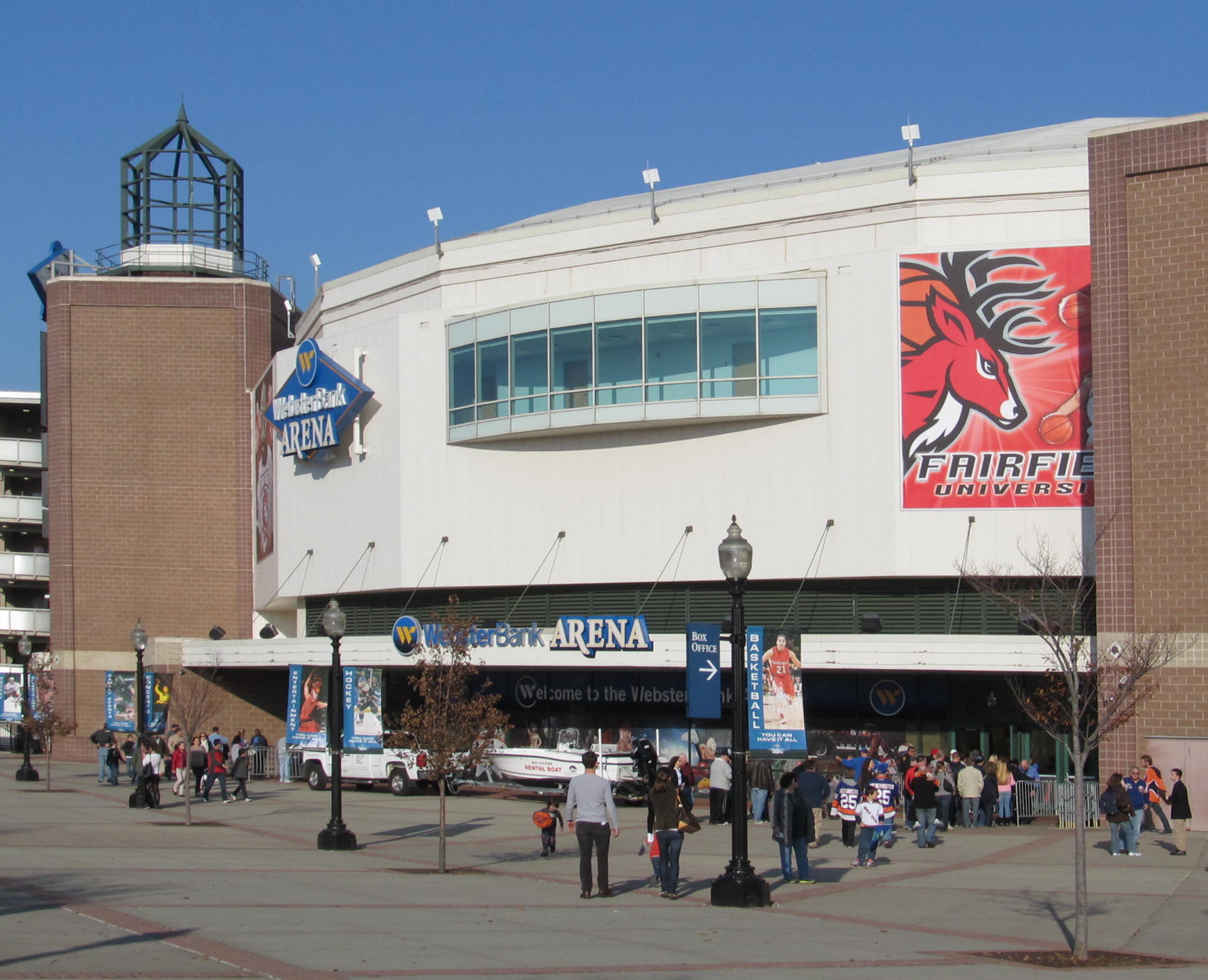
The 25th NXT TakeOver event was held at the Webster Bank Arena in Bridgeport, Connecticut.

TakeOver was a series of professional wrestling events that began in May 2014, as WWE's developmental brand, NXT, held its second WWE Network-exclusive livestreaming event, billed as TakeOver. The "TakeOver" moniker subsequently became the branding for all of NXT's major events held periodically throughout the year. Announced on May 1, 2019, the 25th TakeOver event, titled as TakeOver: XXV, was originally scheduled to be held on Saturday, June 8, 2019, in San Jose, California, but due to Super ShowDown for the main roster being held the day prior, the event was rescheduled for Saturday, June 1 at the Webster Bank Arena in Bridgeport, Connecticut. Tickets went on sale on May 10 via Ticketmaster.

=== Storylines ===
The event included matches that resulted from scripted storylines. Results were predetermined by WWE's writers on the NXT brand, while storylines were produced on WWE's weekly television program, NXT.

At TakeOver: New York, Johnny Gargano defeated Adam Cole in a two out of three falls match to win the vacant NXT Championship. On the May 15 episode of NXT, following more weeks of feuding, a rematch between the two for the title was scheduled for TakeOver: XXV.

On the February 6 episode of NXT, Bianca Belair, Kairi Sane, and Io Shirai defeated NXT Women's Champion Shayna Baszler, Jessamyn Duke, and Marina Shafir in a six-woman tag team match with Shirai pinning Baszler. Shirai, Sane, and Belair then failed to defeat Baszler for the NXT Women's Championship in a fatal four-way match at TakeOver: New York. On the April 17 episode of NXT, Sane faced Baszler for the title once again under the stipulation that she would be barred from challenging for the title again if she lost. The ending came when Shirai shoved Baszler to cause a disqualification finish. After the match, Shafir and Duke pulled Shirai out of the ring and forced her to watch as Baszler stomped on Sane's injured arm. The following week, Shirai was being interviewed backstage about the attack when Baszler, Duke, and Shafir ambushed her. On the May 1 episode, while being interviewed about her attack on Shirai, Baszler refused to answer. The following week, while Baszler was coaching Duke and Shafir, Shirai attacked Baszler, who was then saved by Duke and Shafir, before trainers broke it up. On the May 15 episode, NXT general manager William Regal booked Baszler to defend the NXT Women's Championship against Shirai at TakeOver: XXV.

During the 2019 WWE Superstar Shake-up, NXT Tag Team Champions The Viking Raiders (Erik and Ivar) were drafted to Raw. They then voluntarily relinquished the titles on the May 1 taping of NXT (aired May 15), though had one final title defense against The Street Profits (Angelo Dawkins and Montez Ford) that ended in disqualification after The Forgotten Sons (Wesley Blake and Steve Cutler) and Oney Lorcan and Danny Burch got involved. A fatal four-way tag team ladder match was later scheduled for TakeOver: XXV between Lorcan and Burch, Street Profits, The Forgotten Sons, and The Undisputed Era (Kyle O'Reilly and Bobby Fish).

Since the April 24 episode of NXT, Matt Riddle had been engaging in a feud with The Undisputed Era (Adam Cole, Roderick Strong, Kyle O'Reilly, and Bobby Fish). This led to a match between Cole and Riddle for the May 8 episode, where Riddle won due to an untimely assist from Strong. After the match, Cole blamed Strong for the loss. The following week, The Undisputed Era were being interviewed, and Cole reassured that the group was better when they were on the same page. On the May 22 episode, Riddle joined forces with Johnny Gargano to lay out The Undisputed Era. Afterwards, William Regal announced that Riddle would face Strong at TakeOver: XXV.

On the May 22 episode of NXT, NXT North American Champion Velveteen Dream talked about his title reign when he was interrupted by Tyler Breeze. Breeze taunted Dream and his title reign, and took a cheap shot at Dream before retreating. Later that night, it was made official that Dream would defend the NXT North American Championship against Breeze at TakeOver: XXV.

== Event ==
Other on-screen personnel
Role:	Name:
English commentators	Mauro Ranallo
English commentators	Nigel McGuinness
English commentators	Beth Phoenix
Ring announcer	Alicia Taylor
Referees	Drake Wuertz
Referees	Eddie Orengo
Referees	Darryl Sharma
Pre-show panel	Charly Caruso
Pre-show panel	Sam Roberts
Pre-show panel	Pat McAfee

=== Taped matches ===
Before the event went live on the WWE Network, two matches took place that were taped for the June 5 episode of NXT. In the first match, Keith Lee took on Kona Reeves. After a long stretch of domination from Lee, Reeves performed a uranage for a nearfall. In the end, Lee performed a Big Bang Catastrophe on Reeves to win the match.

In the second match, Mia Yim took on Bianca Belair. In the end, Yim performed a Super Protect Ya Neck on Belair to win the match.

=== Preliminary matches ===
The actual event began with Matt Riddle facing Roderick Strong. Riddle performed a Cradle Belly to Back Inverted Mat Slam on Strong to win.

Next, The Undisputed Era (Bobby Fish and Kyle O'Reilly), The Street Profits (Angelo Dawkins and Montez Ford), Oney Lorcan and Danny Burch, and The Forgotten Sons (Steve Cutler and Wesley Blake) competed in a fatal four-way ladder match for the vacant NXT Tag Team Championship. Ford retrieved the belts to win the titles.

After that, The Velveteen Dream defended the NXT North American Championship against Tyler Breeze. Dream performed a Purple Rainmaker on Breeze to retain the title.

In the penultimate match, Shayna Baszler defended the NXT Women's Championship against Io Shirai. During the match, Jessamyn Duke and Marina Shafir appeared, but Candice LeRae attacked both with a kendo stick. Shirai attempted a Moonsault, but Baszler avoided it and applied the Kirifuda Clutch, only for Shirai to counter into a pinning combination for a nearfall. Shirai attempted another pinning combination, but Baszler kicked out and applied the Kirifuda Clutch again, and Shirai eventually submitted, thus Baszler retained the title. After the match, Shirai struck Baszler with a kendo stick and performed a Moonsault on Baszler. Shirai then performed a Moonsault with a chair on Baszler.

=== Main event ===
In the main event, Johnny Gargano defended the NXT Championship against Adam Cole. Gargano performed a Slingshot DDT on Cole for a near-fall. Cole performed a "Panama Sunrise" off the ring apron on Gargano and scored a near-fall. Cole applied the "Garga-No-Escape" but Gargano escaped. Gargano performed a "Last Shot" on Cole for a near-fall. Cole performed a Last Shot on Gargano for a near-fall. Gargano inadvertently performed a Suicide Dive on Drake Wuertz, the referee, and then performed a Superkick into a chair on Cole. Gargano applied the Garga-No-Escape but Cole escaped. Cole performed a second Panama Sunrise and a second Last Shot on Gargano to win the title. As the show closed, Cole, Kyle O'Reilly, Bobby Fish, and Roderick Strong posed and celebrated Cole's victory.

== Reception ==
NXT TakeOver: XXV was met with highly positive reviews among fans and wrestling journalists. Larry Csonka of 411Mania gave the show an 8/10. He described the event by stating "To the surprise of absolutely no one, NXT TakeOver: XXV was another great TakeOver event with all four titles on the line a big moment for some stars that have been waiting for their chance on the big stage, and a new champion being crowned as the power in NXT shifts".

Dave Meltzer of the Wrestling Observer Newsletter also praised the event with all the matches getting positive ratings. Rating out of a possible 5 stars, he awarded Matt Riddle vs. Roderick Strong and the NXT Tag Team Championship ladder matches 4.5 stars, the NXT North American Championship match of Velveteen Dream vs. Tyler Breeze 3.75 stars, the NXT Women's Championship match of Shayna Baszler vs. Io Shirai 4 stars and the NXT Championship match of Johnny Gargano vs. Adam Cole 5.25 stars.

== Aftermath ==
On the June 12 episode of NXT, it was announced that Shayna Baszler would defend the NXT Women's Championship against Io Shirai in a Steel Cage match on the June 26 episode, where Baszler retained once again, this time after Shirai's shots to Baszler with the cage door to escape the Kirifuda Clutch caused Baszler to escape the cage. After the match, Shirai attacked Candice LeRae, who took out Jessamyn Duke and Marina Shafir during the match, turning heel in the process. A match between Shirai and LeRae was eventually scheduled for TakeOver: Toronto.

The Undisputed Era (NXT Champion Adam Cole, Bobby Fish, Kyle O'Reilly, and Roderick Strong) opened the June 19 episode of NXT to talk about Cole's title win, but were interrupted by Velveteen Dream. Matt Riddle and Tyler Breeze joined the proceedings, leading to a six-man tag team match for that episode's main event, where The Undisputed Era (Cole, Strong, and Fish) were victorious. On July 17, Cole was scheduled to defend the NXT Championship against Johnny Gargano at TakeOver: Toronto in a two out of three falls match.

A non-title match between new NXT Tag Team Champions The Street Profits (Angelo Dawkins and Montez Ford) and The Forgotten Sons (Steve Cutler and Wesley Blake) was also scheduled for the June 26 episode of NXT, which The Street Profits won by disqualification when Jaxson Ryker interfered. After the match, The Forgotten Sons attacked The Street Profits until Danny Burch and Oney Lorcan made the save. This led to a title match pitting Lorcan and Burch against The Street Profits on the July 10 episode, where The Street Profits retained. After the match, Bobby Fish and Kyle O'Reilly stared them down. The Street Profits were then scheduled to defend the NXT Tag Team Championship against O'Reilly and Fish at TakeOver: Toronto.

== Results ==
No.	Results	Stipulations	Times
1^{N}	Keith Lee defeated Kona Reeves by pinfall	Singles match	6:06
2^{N}	Mia Yim defeated Bianca Belair by pinfall	Singles match	10:37
3	Matt Riddle defeated Roderick Strong by pinfall	Singles match	14:45
4	The Street Profits (Angelo Dawkins and Montez Ford) defeated Oney Lorcan and Danny Burch, The Undisputed Era (Kyle O'Reilly and Bobby Fish), and The Forgotten Sons (Wesley Blake and Steve Cutler)	Fatal four-way tag team ladder match for the vacant NXT Tag Team Championship	21:30
5	Velveteen Dream (c) defeated Tyler Breeze by pinfall	Singles match for the NXT North American Championship	16:50
6	Shayna Baszler (c) defeated Io Shirai by submission	Singles match for the NXT Women's Championship	12:15
7	Adam Cole defeated Johnny Gargano (c) by pinfall	Singles match for the NXT Championship	31:45
(c) / – the champion(s) heading into the match; N / – the match was taped for a future broadcast of NXT
