= WWE Year-End Award =

Professional wrestling award

WWE Year-End Awards
- Country: United States
- Presented by: WWE
- First award: December 23, 2018; 7 years ago
- Final award: December 24, 2019; 6 years ago

The WWE Year-End Awards is a concept used by WWE, where awards, similar to the Academy and Grammy Awards, are given to professional wrestlers at the end of the year who have performed on Raw and SmackDown. Introduced in 2018, there have been two editions of the concept. In the first edition, the winners were voted by fans, while for the second, WWE picked the winner themselves. Previously, wrestlers from Raw and SmackDown had been rewarded Slammy Awards between 1986 and 2015.

== Winners and nominees ==
=== 2018 awards ===
The 2018 WWE Year-End Awards were revealed on December 23, 2018, on WWE's Instagram Stories. The results were voted by fans.

**Male Superstar of the Year**: **Braun Strowman**	**Female Superstar of the Year**: **Becky Lynch**
**Tag Team of the Year**: **The Bar (Cesaro and Sheamus)**	**Breakout Superstar of the Year**: **Elias**
**Most Underrated Superstar of the Year**: **Naomi**	**Match of the Year**: **Becky Lynch vs. Charlotte Flair – Evolution**
**Hottest Rivalry of the Year**: **Brock Lesnar vs. Roman Reigns**	**Return of the Year**: **Dean Ambrose**
**Best on the Mic of the Year**: **Paul Heyman**	**Best Diss of the Year**: **Ronda Rousey – promo against Nikki Bella**
**Shocking Moment of the Year**: **Randy Orton – tearing Jeff Hardy's ear**	**General Manager of the Year**: **Paige**
**Most Hated of the Year**: **Baron Corbin**	**Brand of the Year**: **Raw**
**Funniest Moment of the Year**: **Titus O'Neil – falling at the Greatest Royal Rumble**	**Best Reunion of the Year**: **The Shield (Dean Ambrose, Roman Reigns and Seth Rollins)**

=== 2019 awards ===
The 2019 WWE Year-End Awards were announced on December 24, 2019, on WWE Backstage, with Renee Young, Booker T, Christian, Maria Menounos, and Ember Moon as the hosts. This time, WWE picked the winners themselves. The reveals also featured nominees, although no previous announcements had been made about who was in contention for the awards.

Winners are listed first, highlighted in boldface.

**Male Superstar of the Year**: **"The Fiend" Bray Wyatt**; Brock Lesnar; Kofi Kingston; Seth Rollins	**Female Superstar of the Year**: **Becky Lynch**; Bayley; Charlotte Flair; Ronda Rousey
**Men's Tag Team of the Year**: **The New Day (Big E, Kofi Kingston and Xavier Woods)**; The O.C. (Luke Gallows and Karl Anderson); The Revival (Scott Dawson and Dash Wilder); The Viking Raiders (Ivar and Erik)	**Women's Tag Team of the Year**: **The Kabuki Warriors (Asuka and Kairi Sane)**; Alexa Bliss and Nikki Cross; The Boss 'n' Hug Connection (Bayley and Sasha Banks); The IIconics (Billie Kay and Peyton Royce)
**Moment of the Year**: **Kofi Kingston – winning the WWE Championship at WrestleMania**; Becky Lynch – winning the Raw and SmackDown Women's Championships at WrestleMania; Lacey Evans and Natalya – wrestling the first-ever women’s wrestling match in Saudi Arabia at Crown Jewel	**Breakthrough Superstars of the Year**: **The Street Profits (Angelo Dawkins and Montez Ford)**; Nikki Cross; Ricochet; The Viking Raiders (Ivar and Erik)

== See also ==
- List of professional wrestling awards
- NXT Year-End Award
- List of Pro Wrestling Illustrated awards
- List of Wrestling Observer Newsletter awards
