= NXT TakeOver: Toronto (2019) =

WWE Network event

- Promotional poster featuring various NXT wrestlers
- Promotion: WWE
- Brand: NXT
- Date: August 10, 2019
- City: Toronto, Ontario, Canada
- Venue: Scotiabank Arena
- Attendance: 13,735

WWE event chronology
← Previous; Smackville	Next → SummerSlam

NXT TakeOver chronology
← Previous; XXV	Next → WarGames

NXT TakeOver: Toronto chronology
← Previous; 2016	Next → Last

WWE in Canada chronology
← Previous; Survivor Series	Next → SummerSlam

The 2019 NXT TakeOver: Toronto was a professional wrestling livestreaming event produced by the American company WWE, held exclusively for wrestlers from the promotion's developmental brand, NXT. It was the 26th NXT TakeOver event and the second and final TakeOver: Toronto. It took place on August 10, 2019, at the Scotiabank Arena in Toronto, Ontario, Canada. The event was held as part of that year's SummerSlam weekend and aired exclusively on the WWE Network.

Seven matches were contested at the event, including two taped for the following week's episode of NXT. In the main event, Adam Cole defeated Johnny Gargano in a two out of three falls match to retain the NXT Championship. The undercard saw NXT Women's Champion Shayna Baszler, NXT North American Champion Velveteen Dream, and NXT Tag Team Champions Street Profits (Angelo Dawkins and Montez Ford) retain their respective titles.

This was the second TakeOver event held at the Scotiabank Arena, after the first TakeOver: Toronto in November 2016 when it was known as the Air Canada Centre. This was also the last TakeOver held before NXT became recognized as one of WWE's three main brands the following month, which it maintained until September 2021 when it reverted back to being a developmental brand.

== Production ==
=== Background ===
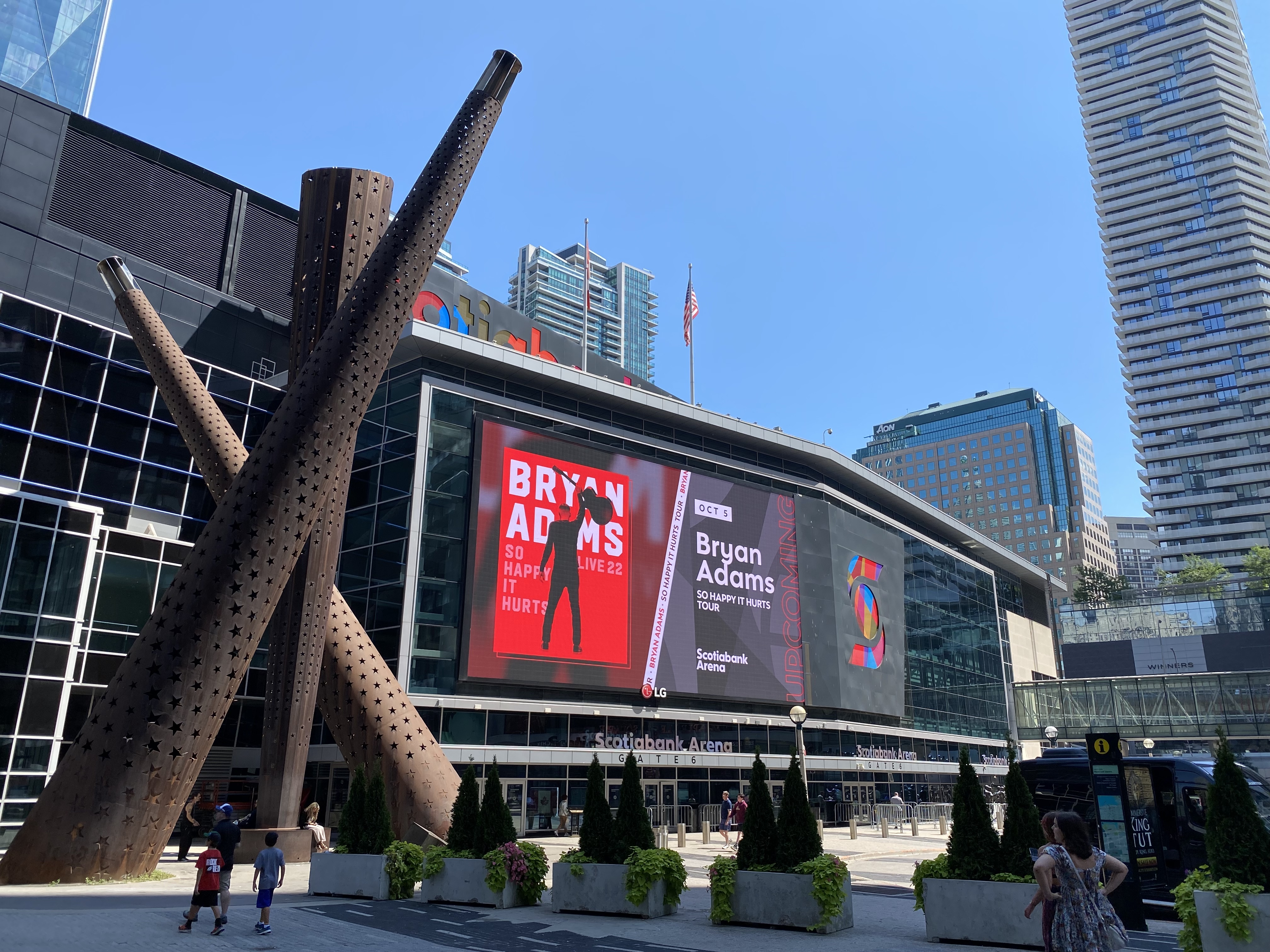
The 26th NXT TakeOver event was the second TakeOver: Toronto held at the Scotiabank Arena in Toronto, Ontario, Canada, after the 2016 event when it was known as the Air Canada Centre (renamed in 2018).

TakeOver was a series of professional wrestling events that began in May 2014, as the American promotion WWE's developmental brand, NXT, held its second WWE Network-exclusive livestreaming event, billed as TakeOver. The "TakeOver" moniker subsequently became the branding for all of NXT's major events held periodically throughout the year. In November 2016, NXT held TakeOver: Toronto, which took place at the Air Canada Centre in Toronto, Ontario, Canada and was held as a support show for that year's Survivor Series for the main roster. On August 27, 2018, the 26th TakeOver event was scheduled to return to the same venue on Saturday, August 10, 2019, which had been renamed as the Scotiabank Arena in 2018, with this second TakeOver: Toronto held as a support show for that year's SummerSlam for the main roster at the same venue.

=== Storylines ===
The card included matches that resulted from scripted storylines. Results were predetermined by WWE's writers on the NXT brand, while storylines were produced on WWE's weekly television program, NXT.

At TakeOver: XXV, Adam Cole defeated Johnny Gargano to win the NXT Championship. On the July 17 episode of NXT, Cole and Gargano confronted each other and a brawl ensued. NXT General Manager William Regal then scheduled a two out of three falls match for the title at TakeOver: Toronto with Cole and Gargano respectively choosing the stipulations for the first two falls; however, Regal would decide the final stipulation if a tie occurred. On the July 24 episode of NXT, Gargano and Cole chose their stipulations. Gargano chose a street fight, while Cole chose a singles match.

At TakeOver: XXV, The Street Profits (Angelo Dawkins and Montez Ford) and The Undisputed Era (Kyle O'Reilly and Bobby Fish) competed in a fatal four-way tag team ladder match for the vacant NXT Tag Team Championship, which The Street Profits won. On July 22, a title match between the two teams was scheduled for TakeOver: Toronto.

Since TakeOver: XXV, Candice LeRae became involved in Io Shirai's feud with NXT Women's Champion Shayna Baszler. After Shirai failed to defeat Baszler for the title in a Steel Cage match on the June 26 episode of NXT, Shirai attacked LeRae, turning heel. Shirai explained her actions on the July 10 episode, while debuting new entrance music, stating that she did not need any friends. LeRae then interfered in Shirai's match on the July 24 episode, and the following week, William Regal told LeRae that she would be facing Shirai at TakeOver: Toronto.

On the April 24 episode of NXT, Mia Yim talked about how dangerous NXT Women's Champion Shayna Baszler was, alongside Jessamyn Duke and Marina Shafir. After Yim won her match on the July 3 episode, she stated that she would be coming for the NXT Women's Championship. The following week, Baszler stated that Yim was not ready. Yim attacked Shafir in the parking lot on the July 17 episode and Duke in a training ring the following week. On the July 31 episode, Baszler and Yim agreed to a title match at TakeOver: Toronto.

On the July 24 episode of NXT, NXT North American Champion Velveteen Dream talked about how great The Undisputed Era's Roderick Strong was when Strong interrupted. Strong suggested a title match for TakeOver: Toronto when Pete Dunne interrupted and performed his finger snap on Strong before eyeing the title. Afterwards, William Regal announced that Dream would be defending the NXT North American Championship against Strong and Dunne in a triple threat match at TakeOver: Toronto.

==== Rescheduled match ====
On the June 19 episode of NXT, the NXT Breakout Tournament was announced. Jordan Myles and Cameron Grimes won their respective semifinal matches on the July 24 and 31 episodes, respectively, and were scheduled to face each other in the finals at TakeOver: Toronto. However, on August 8, the match was rescheduled to the August 14 episode of NXT.

== Event ==
Other on-screen personnel
Role:	Name:
Commentators	Mauro Ranallo
Commentators	Nigel McGuinness
Commentators	Beth Phoenix
Ring announcer	Alicia Taylor
Referees	Drake Wuertz
Referees	Eddie Orengo
Referees	Darryl Sharma
Referees	Jessika Carr
Pre-show panel	Charly Caruso
Pre-show panel	Sam Roberts
Pre-show panel	Pat McAfee

=== Preliminary matches ===
The event opened with The Street Profits (Angelo Dawkins and Montez Ford) defending the NXT Tag Team Championship against The Undisputed Era (Bobby Fish and Kyle O'Reilly). Ford performed a Frog Splash on O'Reilly to retain the titles.

Next, Io Shirai faced Candice LeRae. Shirai forced LeRae to pass out to a Grounded Koji Clutch to win the match by submission.

After that, The Velveteen Dream defended the NXT North American Championship against Roderick Strong and Pete Dunne. Strong performed the End of Heartache on Dunne but Dream performed a Purple Rainmaker on Strong and Dunne. Dream pinned Dunne to retain the title.

In the penultimate bout, Shayna Baszler defended the NXT Women's Championship against Mia Yim. Baszler forced Yim to submit to a Figure Four Headscissors to retain the title.

=== Main event ===
In the main event, Adam Cole defended the NXT Championship against Johnny Gargano in a 2 out of 3 Falls match (also referred to as a "Three Stages of Hell" match due to each fall being contested under different stipulations). The first fall was a singles match. Gargano was disqualified for striking Cole with a chair, meaning Cole was awarded the first fall. The second fall was a Street Fight. Gargano forced Cole to submit to the Garga-No-Escape to win the second fall. The third fall was a Barbed Wire Steel Cage match. Cole performed a Panama Sunrise on Gargano for a near-fall. Cole performed a Panama Sunrise off a ladder on Gargano for a near-fall. Gargano performed an Avalanche Front Flip Piledriver on Cole for a two count. Atop the cage, Cole and Gargano fell through a table. Cole pinned Gargano to retain the title 2-1.

== Aftermath ==
Johnny Gargano made his first appearance since TakeOver: Toronto on the September 11 episode of NXT. He talked about his career on the NXT brand when he was interrupted by Shane Thorne. After Thorne mocked Gargano's accomplishments, Gargano performed a Superkick on Thorne, and stated that he would be staying with the brand.

A rematch between The Street Profits (Angelo Dawkins and Montez Ford) and The Undisputed Era (Bobby Fish and Kyle O'Reilly) for the NXT Tag Team Championship was scheduled for the August 28 episode of NXT, which The Undisputed Era won.

The 2019 TakeOver: Toronto would be the last in the TakeOver: Toronto chronology, which was a subseries of TakeOvers that were held at the same venue in Toronto, Ontario, Canada. It was also the last TakeOver held before the NXT brand became recognized as one of WWE's three main brands in September, until it reverted back to being a developmental brand in September 2021.

== Results ==
No.	Results	Stipulations	Times
1^{N}	Breezango (Tyler Breeze and Fandango) defeated The Forgotten Sons (Wesley Blake and Steve Cutler) by pinfall	Tag team match	5:24
2^{N}	Jordan Myles defeated Cameron Grimes by pinfall	Tournament final of the NXT Breakout Tournament	9:33
3	The Street Profits (Angelo Dawkins and Montez Ford) (c) defeated The Undisputed Era (Kyle O'Reilly and Bobby Fish) by pinfall	Tag team match for the NXT Tag Team Championship	16:55
4	Io Shirai defeated Candice LeRae by technical submission	Singles match	15:00
5	Velveteen Dream (c) defeated Pete Dunne and Roderick Strong by pinfall	Triple threat match for the NXT North American Championship	17:24
6	Shayna Baszler (c) defeated Mia Yim by submission	Singles match for the NXT Women's Championship	14:35
7	Adam Cole (c) defeated Johnny Gargano by 2–1	Two out of three falls match for the NXT Championship (Note: There was a stipulation for each fall. The stipulation for the first fall was a singles match (chosen by Cole), the second fall was a street fight (chosen by Gargano), and the third fall was a barbed wire steel cage match (chosen by NXT General Manager William Regal).): Fall 1: Singles match (won by Cole); Fall 2: Street Fight (won by Gargano); Fall 3: Barbed Wire Steel Cage match (won by Cole)	46:41
(c) / – the champion(s) heading into the match; N / – the match was taped for a future broadcast of NXT
