= SummerSlam (2019) =

WWE pay-per-view and livestreaming event

- Promotional poster featuring Seth Rollins, Kofi Kingston, Becky Lynch, Roman Reigns, and Brock Lesnar
- Promotion: WWE
- Brand(s): Raw; SmackDown; 205 Live
- Date: August 11, 2019
- City: Toronto, Ontario, Canada
- Venue: Scotiabank Arena
- Attendance: 16,904

WWE event chronology
| ← Previous; NXT TakeOver: Toronto | Next → NXT UK TakeOver: Cardiff |

SummerSlam chronology
| ← Previous; 2018 | Next → 2020 |

WWE in Canada chronology
| ← Previous; NXT TakeOver: Toronto | Next → Elimination Chamber |

The 2019 SummerSlam was a professional wrestling pay-per-view (PPV) and livestreaming event produced by the American promotion WWE, held for wrestlers from the promotion's main roster brands, Raw, SmackDown, and 205 Live. It was the 32nd annual SummerSlam and took place on August 11, 2019, at the Scotiabank Arena in Toronto, Ontario, Canada. This was the second SummerSlam held at this venue, after the 2004 event when it was known as the Air Canada Centre, and the first held outside of Brooklyn, New York, United States since 2014.

Twelve matches were contested at the event, including three on the Kickoff pre-show. In the main event, Seth Rollins defeated Brock Lesnar to win Raw's Universal Championship for a second time. In the penultimate match, which was an interpromotional match, Raw's Bray Wyatt debuted his new "Fiend" persona and defeated SmackDown's Finn Bálor. In other prominent matches, SmackDown's Charlotte Flair defeated WWE Hall of Famer Trish Stratus by submission, Kevin Owens defeated Shane McMahon to keep his job on SmackDown, SmackDown's WWE Champion Kofi Kingston fought Randy Orton to a double countout, thus Kingston retained the title, and free agent Goldberg defeated SmackDown's Dolph Ziggler.

== Production ==
=== Background ===
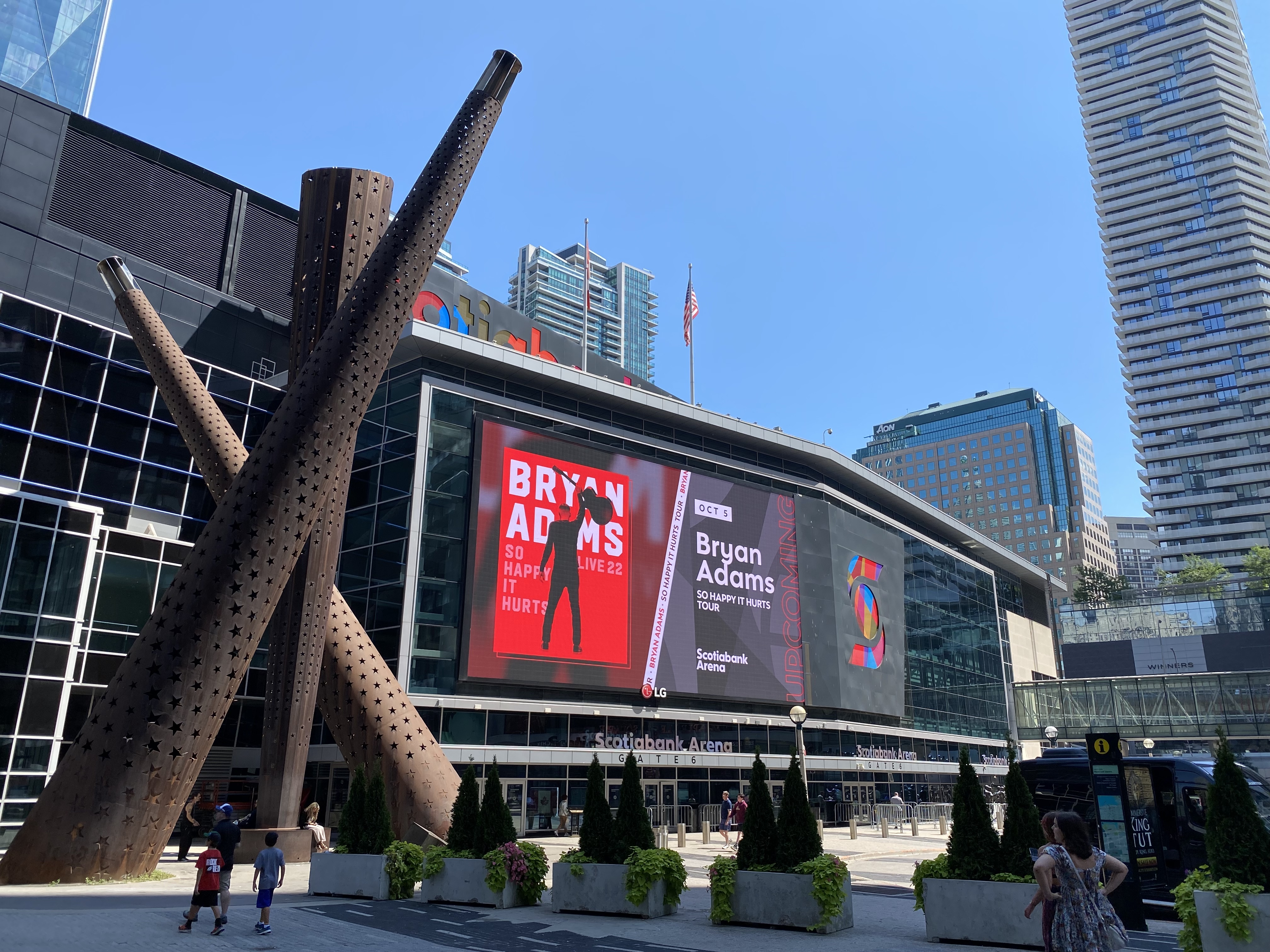
The 32nd annual SummerSlam was the second time for the event to be held at the Scotiabank Arena in Toronto, Ontario, Canada, after the 2004 event when it was known as the Air Canada Centre (renamed in 2018).

SummerSlam is an annual professional wrestling event produced every August by the American company WWE since 1988. It was originally broadcast exclusively via pay-per-view (PPV) before it began simultaneously livestreaming on the WWE Network in 2014. Dubbed "The Biggest Party of the Summer", it is one of the promotion's original four PPVs, along with WrestleMania, Royal Rumble, and Survivor Series, referred to as the "Big Four". It has since become considered WWE's second biggest event of the year behind WrestleMania.

Announced on August 27, 2018, the 32nd SummerSlam was scheduled to be held on August 11, 2019, at the Scotiabank Arena in Toronto, Ontario, Canada, and featured wrestlers from the Raw, SmackDown, and 205 Live brand divisions. This was the second SummerSlam to be held at this venue, after the 2004 event when it was known as the Air Canada Centre (renamed in 2018). It was also the first SummerSlam to be held outside of Brookln, New York, United States since 2014. Tickets went on sale on March 15 through Ticketmaster.

=== Storylines ===
The event comprised 12 matches, including three on the Kickoff pre-show, that resulted from scripted storylines. Results were predetermined by WWE's writers on the Raw, SmackDown, and 205 Live brands, while storylines were produced on WWE's weekly television shows, Monday Night Raw, SmackDown Live, and the cruiserweight-exclusive 205 Live.

At WrestleMania 35, Seth Rollins defeated Brock Lesnar to win the Universal Championship. Lesnar then disappeared from television for several weeks before inserting himself in the 2019 Money in the Bank ladder match and won, earning a match for a world championship of his choice at any time within the next year. After teasing some cash-ins, Lesnar finally cashed in his Money in the Bank contract at Extreme Rules and won back the Universal Championship right after Rollins had just retained the title. On the following night's Raw, Rollins won a cross-brand 10-man battle royal to earn a rematch against Lesnar at SummerSlam. During Raw Reunion on July 22, Lesnar's advocate Paul Heyman stated that Lesnar cashed in on Rollins because Rollins had done the same to Lesnar back at WrestleMania 31 in March 2015.

On the July 15 episode of Raw, Natalya won a fatal four-way elimination match to determine the number one contender against Becky Lynch for the Raw Women's Championship at SummerSlam. After Lynch's match on the July 29 episode, Natalya applied the Sharpshooter on Lynch and later suggested a submission match, which was made official the following week.

On the July 16 episode of SmackDown, after SmackDown Women's Champion Bayley and Ember Moon won their tag team match in which Moon scored the pin, Bayley selected Moon as the number one contender for her title at SummerSlam.

During the summer of 2019, Kevin Owens became furious with Shane McMahon due to the latter taking up more and more screen time each week from other wrestlers and exerting even more authority, which was in contradiction to what The McMahon Family (Vince McMahon, Stephanie McMahon, Shane, and Triple H) had promised several months prior. Despite Shane's attempts to ban Owens from SmackDown, Owens would nevertheless show up and attack Shane at opportune moments. During Raw Reunion on July 22, Owens challenged Shane to a match at SummerSlam and said he would quit WWE if he were to lose, and Shane accepted.

On the July 23 episode of SmackDown, WWE Champion Kofi Kingston selected Randy Orton as his next title defense at SummerSlam. Kingston referenced their past rivalry in 2009 where Kingston defeated Orton, but claimed that Orton used his influence to keep Kingston out of the main event scene. Orton stated that he was right that he held Kingston back and accepted the challenge. Orton also claimed credit for Kingston becoming WWE Champion, as it was Orton who had injured Ali, who Kingston had replaced in the WWE Championship match at Elimination Chamber, which led to Kingston winning the title at WrestleMania 35.

Following the Superstar Shake-up in April, Bray Wyatt, who had been on hiatus since the previous summer, began appearing as an eerie children's entertainer in pre-taped segments called Firefly Fun Fouse. He eventually revealed a new sinister alternate persona called "The Fiend". After wild card guest Finn Bálor's match on the July 15 episode of Raw, the lights went out and Wyatt appeared as "The Fiend" and attacked Bálor. The following week on SmackDown, Bálor challenged Wyatt to a match at SummerSlam. Wyatt appeared inside the Fun House and stated that he was a fan of Bálor, however, "The Fiend" was not and that "The Fiend" accepted the challenge.

At Extreme Rules, AJ Styles defeated Ricochet to win the United States Championship thanks to help from his O.C. teammates, Luke Gallows and Karl Anderson. On the July 29 episode of Raw, Ricochet won a gauntlet match, to earn a rematch for the title at SummerSlam.

On the July 23 episode of SmackDown, WWE Hall of Famer Shawn Michaels' appearance on "Miz TV" was interrupted by Dolph Ziggler, who insulted Michaels. The Miz intervened but was pulled back by Michaels. Ziggler then attempted to punch Michaels, but accidentally struck Miz instead and then superkicked Michaels. The following week, a match between Miz and Ziggler was scheduled for SummerSlam, however, during the contract signing on the August 5 episode of Raw, Miz revealed that their match would actually take place on the following Raw and that Ziggler would fight someone else at SummerSlam. Ziggler presumed that this referred to Michaels but instead, WWE Hall of Famer Goldberg (whom Ziggler disparaged in his promos against Michaels) appeared and was revealed as Ziggler's opponent.

Backstage during the July 23 episode of SmackDown, Charlotte Flair voiced her displeasure that she was not scheduled to compete at SummerSlam. Despite not being on the card, Flair stated she would be part of SummerSlam to prove that she was the "greatest female superstar of all-time". The following week, WWE Hall of Famer Trish Stratus was a guest on Jerry Lawler's "King's Court". They were interrupted by Flair, who challenged Stratus to a match at SummerSlam. After disparaging comments from Flair, Stratus accepted the challenge.

On the August 6 episode of 205 Live, Oney Lorcan won a six-pack challenge to earn the right to face Drew Gulak for the WWE Cruiserweight Championship on the SummerSlam Kickoff pre-show.

== Event ==
Other on-screen personnel
| Role: | Name: |
|---|---|
| Commentators | Michael Cole (Raw) |
| Commentators | Corey Graves (Raw/SmackDown) |
| Commentators | Renee Young (Raw) |
| Commentators | Tom Phillips (SmackDown) |
| Commentators | Byron Saxton (SmackDown) |
| Commentators | Vic Joseph (205 Live) |
| Commentators | Nigel McGuinness (205 Live) |
| Commentators | Aiden English (205 Live) |
| Spanish commentators | Carlos Cabrera |
| Spanish commentators | Marcelo Rodríguez |
| German commentators | Carsten Schaefer |
| German commentators | Tim Haber |
| German commentators | Calvin Knie |
| Ring announcers | Greg Hamilton (SmackDown/205 Live) |
| Ring announcers | Mike Rome (Raw) |
| Referees | Eddie Orengo SmackDown |
| Referees | John Cone |
| Referees | Dan Engler |
| Referees | Darrick Moore |
| Referees | Chad Patton |
| Referees | Darryl Sharma |
| Referees | Ryan Tran |
| Referees | Drake Wuertz |
| Referees | Rod Zapata |
| Interviewers | Kayla Braxton |
| Interviewers | Sarah Schreiber |
| Pre-show panel | Jonathan Coachman |
| Pre-show panel | Charly Caruso |
| Pre-show panel | David Otunga |
| Pre-show panel | Beth Phoenix |
| Pre-show panel | The Miz |
| Pre-show panel | Mick Foley |
| Pre-show panel | Booker T |
| Pre-show panel | Jerry Lawler |
| Pre-show correspondents | Sam Roberts |
| Pre-show correspondents | John "Bradshaw" Layfield |

=== Pre-show ===
Three matches were contested on the SummerSlam Kickoff pre-show. In the first match, Drew Gulak defended the WWE Cruiserweight Championship against Oney Lorcan. In the end, Gulak performed a Cyclone Crash to retain the title.

Next, Buddy Murphy faced Apollo Crews. In the end, Murphy was attacked by Rowan—who Murphy had accused of attacking Roman Reigns on recent episodes of Raw and SmackDown—thus Murphy won via disqualification. Following the match, Rowan continued to attack Murphy at ringside and performed a powerbomb on Murphy onto the ring apron.

Following that, Elias performed a song insulting Toronto which prompted Toronto native and WWE Hall of Famer Edge to interrupt Elias. After trading some insults, Edge performed a Spear on Elias.

In the final pre-show match, Alexa Bliss and Nikki Cross defended the WWE Women's Tag Team Championship against The IIconics (Billie Kay and Peyton Royce). In the end, Bliss performed Twisted Bliss on Royce to retain the title.

=== Preliminary matches ===
The actual pay-per-view opened with the submission match in which Becky Lynch defended the Raw Women's Championship against Natalya. During the match, Lynch applied a Sharpshooter of her own on Natalya, however, Natalya immediately retaliated with a Dis-Arm-Her of her own. In the climax, Natalya applied the sharpshooter again, only for Lynch to counter and apply the Dis-Arm-Her, forcing Natalya to submit to retain the title.

Next, Goldberg faced Dolph Ziggler. As soon as the match began, Ziggler performed a superkick on Goldberg for a one-count. Ziggler performed a second superkick on Goldberg for another one-count. As Ziggler attempted a third, Goldberg performed a Spear followed by a Jackhammer on Ziggler to win the match in under two minutes. Following the match, Ziggler taunted Goldberg, who responded by performing another Spear on Ziggler. After Goldberg went backstage, Ziggler taunted him again, prompting Goldberg to return and perform one final Spear on Ziggler.

After that, AJ Styles (accompanied by his O.C. stablemates Luke Gallows and Karl Anderson) defended Raw's United States Championship against Ricochet. In the end, as Ricochet attempted a Phoenix splash on Styles, Styles countered into a Styles Clash to retain the title. Following the match, Gallows and Anderson performed the Magic Killer on Ricochet.

In the fourth match, Bayley defended the SmackDown Women's Championship against Ember Moon. In the end, Bayley performed a Bayley-to-Belly on Moon from the top rope to retain the title.

After that, Kevin Owens put his WWE career on the line against Shane McMahon. Before the match began, Shane introduced Elias as the special guest enforcer. During the match, Elias distracted Owens, allowing Shane to attack Owens with multiple cheap shots. Shane countered a pop-up powerbomb attempt with a DDT for a near-fall. Owens eventually performed a pop-up powerbomb on Shane, only for Elias to pull the referee out from the ring. Owens then attacked Elias, which also incapacitated the referee. Owens further attacked Elias with multiple chair shots. With the referee down, Owens performed a low blow and a stunner on Shane to win the match and keep his job.

Next, Charlotte Flair faced Trish Stratus. During the match, Stratus applied her own figure-four leglock on Flair followed by the Figure-Eight Leglock. Stratus performed a Stratusfaction for a near-fall. In the end, Flair performed a Big Boot on Stratus and forced Stratus to submit to the Figure-Eight Leglock to win the match. After the match, Stratus was given a standing ovation.

After that, Kofi Kingston defended SmackDown's WWE Championship against Randy Orton. Orton delivered multiple side slams to Kingston on the broadcast tables. As Orton went for a superplex, Kingston countered into a tornado DDT for a near-fall. Orton eventually performed an RKO in midair on Kingston, however, Kingston rolled out of the ring. Outside the ring, Orton taunted Kingston's family, who were in the front row, and a brawl ensued between Kingston and Orton at ringside. Both were counted out, thus Kingston retained the title, and Kingston continued to beat down Orton.

In the penultimate match, Finn Bálor faced off against Bray Wyatt's new persona, "The Fiend". "The Fiend" dominated the match. In the end, "The Fiend" countered a Coup de Grace from Bálor into the Mandible claw, causing Bálor to pass out and allow "The Fiend" to get the pinfall victory.

=== Main event ===
In the main event, Brock Lesnar (accompanied by Paul Heyman) defended Raw's Universal Championship against Seth Rollins. At the start of the match, Rollins rolled out of a Suplex attempt and performed The Stomp for a near-fall. Rollins then performed two Superkicks and attempted another Stomp, but Lesnar caught Rollins with an F-5. Lesnar performed multiple German and Vertical suplexes on Rollins. Outside the ring, Rollins performed a Frog Splash on Lesnar through the Spanish announce table, and then another Frog Splash and a second Stomp in the ring for a nearfall. In the end, as Rollins attempted a third Stomp, Lesnar caught him and attempted a second F-5, however, Rollins countered and performed a third Superkick and a third Stomp on Lesnar to win the match by pinfall, winning the title, and giving him his first singles clean defeat as defending world champion in WWE.

== Reception ==
The event received fairly positive reviews. Jason Powell of Pro Wrestling Dot Net described SummerSlam as "a solid show overall that closed with a satisfying title change". He described the main event as "a good match", saying that "Lesnar had his supporters in the crowd, but it seemed like Rollins won over some of his detractors as the match went on. The injury angle made some of Lesnar's offense seem even more punishing".

Powell also gave the Wyatt-Bálor match a positive review and said that "Wyatt's Fiend persona came off very well and the live crowd clearly loved it". Powell criticized the Kingston-Orton match finish and called it "weak" while saying that it was "a lousy finish to a decent match that was poorly executed". Powell described the Goldberg-Ziggler bout as "a fun Goldberg-style match. I love that they started it with Dolph getting the surprising offense before Goldberg did what felt inevitable. This was a nice redemption moment for Goldberg after he suffered the concussion and his match with Undertaker fell apart in Saudi Arabia, not to mention that the Canadian fans weren't still holding a grudge over booting Bret Hart in the head".

== Aftermath ==
=== Raw ===
The following night on Raw, new Universal Champion Seth Rollins thanked the fans for their support before being interrupted by The O.C. (United States Champion AJ Styles and Raw Tag Team Champions Luke Gallows and Karl Anderson). Styles claimed to be the better champion and challenged Rollins to a champion versus champion non-title match, which ended in a disqualification due to interference from Gallows and Anderson. Ricochet and Braun Strowman ran out to make the save. Also on the show, Paul Heyman said that he was informed by WWE officials that Brock Lesnar would not be granted a rematch for the Universal Championship. The following week, Rollins and Strowman defeated Gallows and Anderson to win the Raw Tag Team Championship.

Also on Raw, Raw Women's Champion Becky Lynch said she respected Natalya and put out a warning to the rest of the women's division. Natalya later came out with her arm in a sling and declared that she would face Lynch again. She was interrupted by the returning Sasha Banks, who last appeared at WrestleMania 35. After hugging and consoling Natalya, Banks attacked her, thus turning heel. Lynch came out for the save, but was attacked by Banks with a steel chair. Banks again attacked Natalya backstage the following week. A match between Banks and Natalya took place on the August 26 episode, where Banks won. The following week, Banks challenged Lynch for the Raw Women's Championship at Clash of Champions, and Lynch accepted.

Dolph Ziggler had his match with The Miz, which he also lost. After the match, Ziggler taunted Miz, who performed a "Skull Crushing Finale" on Ziggler.

=== SmackDown ===
Following their SummerSlam match, Shane McMahon fined Kevin Owens US$100,000 for attacking a designated official, Elias, who was again appointed as the special guest enforcer for Owens' match against Samoa Joe where Elias cost Owens the match by making a fast three count. After several more weeks of feuding, Shane ultimately fired Owens. Owens then threatened Shane with a lawsuit for wrongful termination, which in turn resulted in Owens challenging Shane to a ladder match where if Shane won, Owens would drop the lawsuit and leave WWE for good, but if Owens won, Shane would be gone. Shane accepted and the match was scheduled for SmackDown's 20th Anniversary on October 4, where Owens won.

Also on SmackDown, The New Day (WWE Champion Kofi Kingston and SmackDown Tag Team Champions Big E and Xavier Woods) faced Randy Orton and The Revival (Scott Dawson and Dash Wilder) in a six-man tag team match where Orton and The Revival won. Following the match, Orton performed an RKO on all three members of The New Day. On the August 19 episode of Raw, Big E and Woods defeated The Revival via disqualification after interference from Orton. Afterwards, Kingston came to The New Day's aid, only for Orton to attack Kingston, while The Revival and Orton injured Woods' leg. On August 27, a rematch between Kingston and Orton for the WWE Championship was scheduled for Clash of Champions, while Big E and Woods were also scheduled to defend the SmackDown Tag Team Championship against The Revival at the event.

Also on SmackDown, Daniel Bryan and Rowan forced Buddy Murphy to reveal that he was lying in saying that Rowan was Roman Reigns' attacker. Later on the show, Bryan and Rowan revealed that they conducted their own investigation to find out who attacked Reigns. The following week, they claimed that the attacker was a man who merely resembled Rowan. On the August 27 episode, however, Reigns found additional footage that Rowan was seen tipping over the equipment. This caused Bryan and Rowan to split due to Rowan lying, and a no disqualification match between Reigns and Rowan was scheduled for Clash of Champions.

Charlotte Flair followed up with her win over Trish Stratus at SummerSlam with a win over Ember Moon on the following episode of SmackDown. The following week, Flair issued a challenge to Bayley for the SmackDown Women's Championship at Clash of Champions, which Bayley accepted.

=== 205 Live ===
On 205 Live, Oney Lorcan had a rematch against Drew Gulak for the WWE Cruiserweight Championship, however, Gulak retained the title.

The 2019 SummerSlam would be the final SummerSlam to feature the 205 Live brand, as in October, 205 Live and the WWE Cruiserweight Championship were merged under the NXT umbrella.

== Results ==
| No. | Results | Stipulations | Times |
|---|---|---|---|
| 1^{P} | Drew Gulak (c) defeated Oney Lorcan by pinfall | Singles match for the WWE Cruiserweight Championship | 10:50 |
| 2^{P} | Buddy Murphy defeated Apollo Crews by disqualification | Singles match | 4:50 |
| 3^{P} | Alexa Bliss and Nikki Cross (c) defeated The IIconics (Billie Kay and Peyton Royce) by pinfall | Tag team match for the WWE Women's Tag Team Championship | 7:55 |
| 4 | Becky Lynch (c) defeated Natalya by submission | Submission match for the WWE Raw Women's Championship | 12:35 |
| 5 | Goldberg defeated Dolph Ziggler by pinfall | Singles match | 1:50 |
| 6 | AJ Styles (c) (with Luke Gallows and Karl Anderson) defeated Ricochet by pinfall | Singles match for the WWE United States Championship | 13:00 |
| 7 | Bayley (c) defeated Ember Moon by pinfall | Singles match for the WWE SmackDown Women's Championship | 10:00 |
| 8 | Kevin Owens defeated Shane McMahon by pinfall | Singles match Had Owens lost, he would have quit WWE. Elias was the special guest enforcer. | 9:20 |
| 9 | Charlotte Flair defeated Trish Stratus by submission | Singles match | 16:45 |
| 10 | Kofi Kingston (c) vs. Randy Orton ended in a double countout | Singles match for the WWE Championship | 16:40 |
| 11 | "The Fiend" Bray Wyatt defeated Finn Bálor by pinfall | Singles match | 3:25 |
| 12 | Seth Rollins defeated Brock Lesnar (c) (with Paul Heyman) by pinfall | Singles match for the WWE Universal Championship | 13:25 |
(c) / – the champion(s) heading into the match; P / – the match was broadcast on the pre-show

== See also ==
- WWE in Canada
- Professional wrestling in Canada
