= NXT TakeOver: Toronto (2016) =

WWE Network event

- Promotion: WWE
- Brand: NXT
- Date: November 19, 2016
- City: Toronto, Ontario, Canada
- Venue: Air Canada Centre
- Attendance: 12,649

WWE event chronology
← Previous; Hell in a Cell	Next → Survivor Series

NXT TakeOver chronology
← Previous; Brooklyn II	Next → San Antonio

NXT TakeOver: Toronto chronology
← Previous; First	Next → 2019

WWE in Canada chronology
← Previous; Roadblock	Next → Survivor Series

The 2016 NXT TakeOver: Toronto was a professional wrestling livestreaming event produced by the American company WWE, held exclusively for wrestlers from the promotion's developmental brand, NXT. It was the 12th NXT TakeOver event and the inaugural TakeOver: Toronto. It took place on Saturday, November 19, 2016, at the Air Canada Centre in Toronto, Ontario, Canada and aired exclusively on the WWE Network. It was held as part of that year's Survivor Series weekend, and was the second TakeOver held outside of the United States, after TakeOver: London in December 2015.

Five matches were contested at the event. In the main event, Samoa Joe defeated Shinsuke Nakamura to win the NXT Championship and became the first man to hold the title twice. It was also Mickie James's return to WWE for one night only in NXT.

== Production ==
=== Background ===
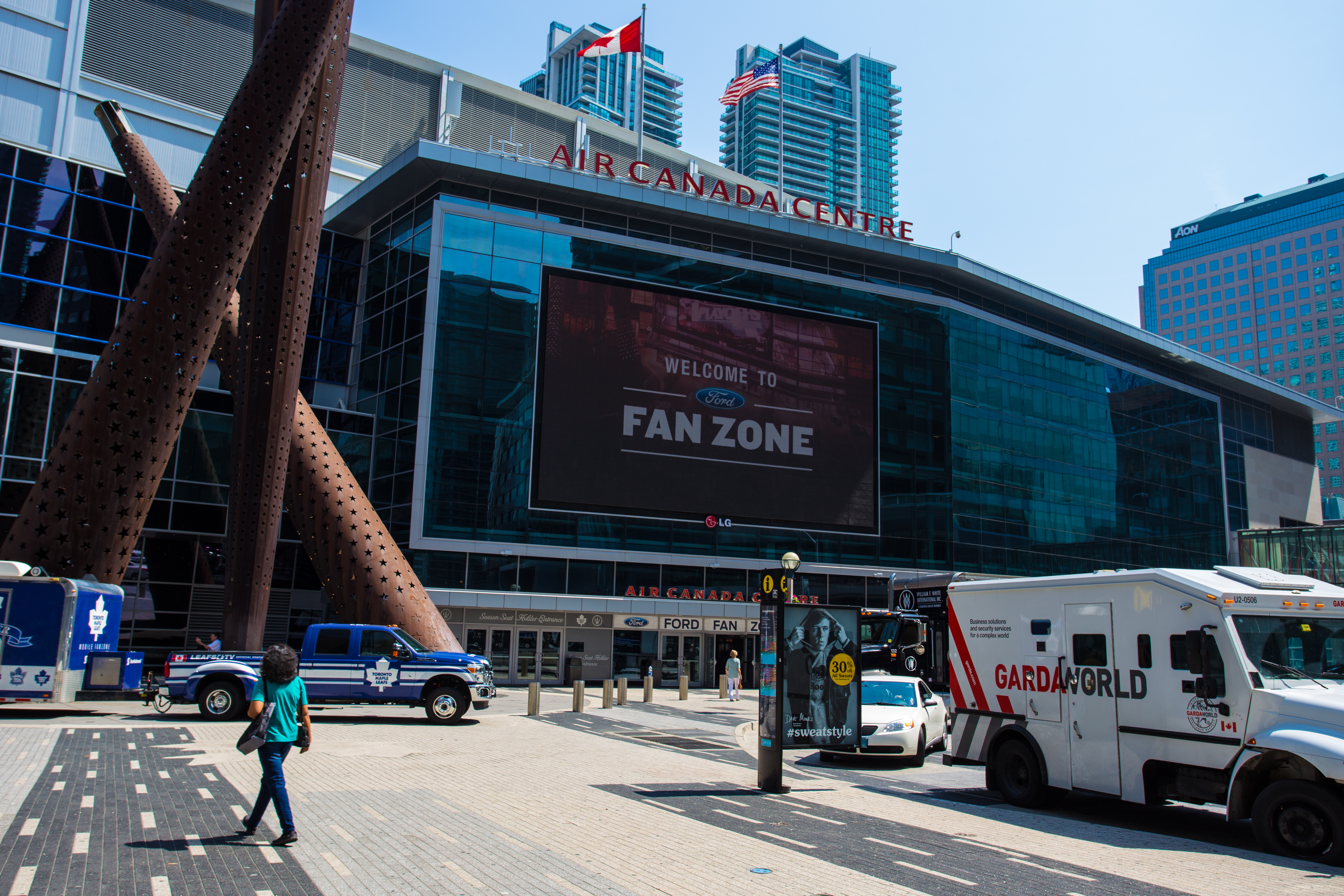
The 12th NXT TakeOver event was held at the Air Canada Centre in Toronto, Ontario, Canada.

TakeOver was a series of professional wrestling events that began in May 2014, as the American promotion WWE's developmental brand, NXT, held its second WWE Network-exclusive livestreaming event, billed as TakeOver. The "TakeOver" moniker subsequently became the branding for all of NXT's major events held periodically throughout the year. Announced on September 2, 2016, TakeOver: Toronto was scheduled as the 12th TakeOver event and took place on Saturday, November 19, 2016, as a support show for that year's Survivor Series for the main roster. It was held at the Air Canada Centre, the same venue as Survivor Series, and was named after the venue's city of Toronto, Ontario, Canada. It was in turn the second TakeOver held outside of the United States, after TakeOver: London in December 2015. Tickets went on sale on September 23, 2016, through Ticketmaster.

=== Storylines ===
The card included matches that resulted from scripted storylines. Results were predetermined by WWE's writers on the NXT brand, while storylines were produced on WWE's weekly television program, NXT.

On the September 28 episode of NXT, William Regal scheduled the second annual Dusty Rhodes Tag Team Classic, culminating with the finals at TakeOver: Toronto. The tournament started on the October 5 episode.

== Event ==
Other on-screen personnel
Role	Name
Commentators	Tom Phillips
Commentators	Corey Graves
Ring announcer	Mike Rome
Pre-show panel	Charly Caruso
Pre-show panel	Lita
Pre-show panel	Mauro Ranallo
Referees	Drake Wuertz
Referees	Eddie Orengo
Referees	Danilo Anfibio

=== Preliminary matches ===
In the first match, Bobby Roode faced Tye Dillinger. The match ended when Roode executed a "Glorious DDT" on Dillinger to win the match.

Next, The Authors of Pain (Akam and Rezar) faced TM-61 (Nick Miller and Shane Thorne) in the final of the Dusty Rhodes Tag Team Classic, with Paul Ellering suspended above the ring inside a cage. In the end, The Authors of Pain performed "The Last Chapter" on Thorne to win the tournament.

In the third match, The Revival (Dash Wilder and Scott Dawson) defended the NXT Tag Team Championship against #DIY (Johnny Gargano and Tommaso Ciampa) in a two out of three falls tag team match. The Revival won the first fall after performing the "Shatter Machine" on Gargano. #DIY won the second fall after performing a running knee/superkick combination on Dawson. #DIY won the third fall after Wilder submitted to the "Garga-No Escape" by Gargano and Dawson submitted to an armbar by Ciampa simultaneously, thus #DIY won the titles.

After that, Asuka defended the NXT Women's Championship against Mickie James. During the match, Mickie executed a "Mick Kick" on Asuka, but Asuka placed her foot on the bottom rope, voiding the pinfall. Asuka forced Mickie to submit to the "Asuka Lock" to win the match.

=== Main event ===
In the main event, Shinsuke Nakamura defended the NXT Championship against Samoa Joe. During the match, Joe attempted a muscle buster but Nakamura countered and executed a "Kinshasa" on Joe for a nearfall. Nakamura attempted another "Kinshasa", but Joe avoided the attempt and applied the "Coquina Clutch". Nakamura attempted to escape, but Joe performed a German suplex followed by a dragon suplex and an X-Plex for a near-fall. When Nakamura executed another "Kinshasa" on Joe, Joe rolled out of the ring. Nakamura attempted a third "Kinshasa", but Joe avoided the attempt, attacked Nakamura with a low blow and performed a side slam onto the steel steps on Nakamura. Joe performed a muscle buster on Nakamura to win the title for a second time.

== Aftermath ==
Two weeks after the event, on December 3, Shinsuke Nakamura defeated Samoa Joe to win back the NXT Championship in Osaka, Japan.

NXT Post show was in Toronto on November 23 and in Ottawa on November 30.

On December 29, WWE.com named The Revival vs. #DIY the "WWE Match Of The Year".

Following her appearance at the event, Mickie James turned heel on the January 17, 2017, episode of SmackDown, doing so by helping Alexa Bliss retain the SmackDown Women's Championship against Becky Lynch in a Steel Cage match, while revealing herself as the villainess under the "La Luchadora" mask. The appearance marked James' return to the main roster for the first time since 2010.

The 2016 TakeOver: Toronto would be the first of two in a TakeOver: Toronto chronology, a subseries of TakeOvers that were held in Toronto, Ontario, Canada at the Air Canada Centre, which was renamed to the Scotiabank Arena in 2018. The second Toronto event was held in 2019.

== Results ==
No.	Results	Stipulations	Times
1^{N}	Kona Reeves vs. Rich Swann ended in a no contest	Singles match	4:30
2^{N}	Aliyah, Ember Moon, and Liv Morgan defeated Sonya Deville, Billie Kay, and Peyton Royce by pinfall	Six-woman tag team match	5:40
3	Bobby Roode defeated Tye Dillinger by pinfall	Singles match	16:28
4	The Authors of Pain (Akam and Rezar) (with Paul Ellering) defeated TM-61 (Nick Miller and Shane Thorne) by pinfall	Dusty Rhodes Tag Team Classic tournament final match Paul Ellering was suspended above the ring inside a cage.	8:20
5	#DIY (Johnny Gargano and Tommaso Ciampa) defeated The Revival (Dash Wilder and Scott Dawson) (c) 2–1	Two out of three falls match for the NXT Tag Team Championship	22:18
6	Asuka (c) defeated Mickie James by submission	Singles match for the NXT Women's Championship	13:07
7	Samoa Joe defeated Shinsuke Nakamura (c) by pinfall	Singles match for the NXT Championship	20:12
(c) / – the champion(s) heading into the match; N / – the match was taped for a future broadcast of NXT

=== Dusty Rhodes Tag Team Classic ===
First round NXT; September 15 – October 13, 2016 (Aired: October 5–26)
TM-61 (Nick Miller and Shane Thorne)	Pinfall
Riddick Moss and Tino Sabbatelli	9:00
Austin Aries and Roderick Strong	Pinfall
Heavy Machinery (Otis Dozovic and Tucker Knight)	5:15
Kota Ibushi and T. J. Perkins (Note: Kota Ibushi's original partner, Hideo Itami, was injured before the tournament began; Itami was replaced by T. J. Perkins.)	Submission
Lince Dorado and Mustafa Ali	9:03
Bobby Roode and Tye Dillinger	2:00
Sanity (Alexander Wolfe and Sawyer Fulton)	Pinfall
The Authors of Pain (Akam and Rezar)	Pinfall
The Bollywood Boyz (Gurv Sihra and Harv Sihra)	2:00
No Way Jose and Rich Swann	Pinfall
Drew Gulak and Tony Nese	7:12
The Revival (Dash Wilder and Scott Dawson)	Pinfall
Andrade Almas and Cedric Alexander	9:00
#DIY (Johnny Gargano and Tommaso Ciampa)	Pinfall
Ho Ho Lun and Tian Bing	4:11

Quarterfinals; NXT; October 13–28, 2016 (Aired: November 2)
TM-61	Pinfall (Note: Austin Aries could not compete due to injury. William Regal decided that the winners would be determined by a singles match between TM-61's Shane Thorne and Aries' partner Roderick Strong.)
Austin Aries and Roderick Strong	8:07
Kota Ibushi and T. J. Perkins	9:45
Sanity	Pinfall
The Authors of Pain	Pinfall
No Way Jose and Rich Swann	7:15
The Revival
#DIY	Forfeit (Note: The Revival withdrew from the tournament after Dawson was injured.)

Semifinals; NXT; October 13, 2016 (Aired: November 11)
TM-61	Pinfall
Sanity	5:42
The Authors of Pain	Pinfall
#DIY	10:27

Final; NXT TakeOver: Toronto; November 19, 2016
TM-61	8:20
The Authors of Pain	Pinfall
