= Montez Ford =

American professional wrestler (born 1990)

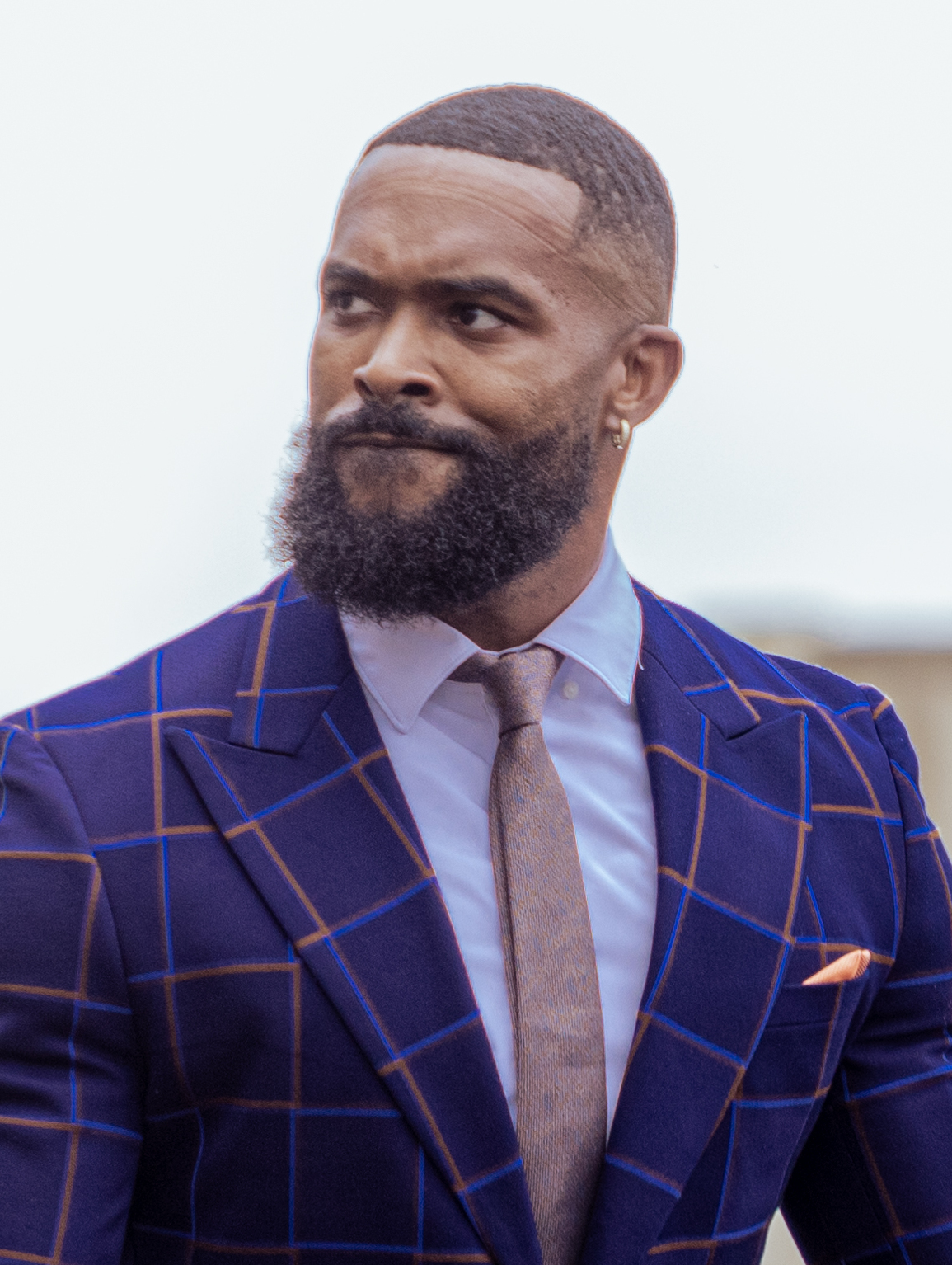
- Ford in 2025

Personal information
- Born: Kenneth Crawford; May 31, 1990 (age 36) Chicago, Illinois, U.S.
- Spouse: Bianca Belair (m. 2018)
- Children: 3

Professional wrestling career
- Ring name(s): Kenneth Crawford; Montez Ford
- Billed height: 6 ft 1 in (185 cm)
- Billed weight: 232 lb (105 kg)
- Billed from: Chicago, Illinois
- Trained by: WWE Performance Center
- Debut: September 26, 2015
- Military service
- Allegiance: United States
- Branch: United States Marine Corps; United States Navy
- Service years: 2008–2012

Kenneth Crawford (born May 31, 1990) is an American professional wrestler. He is signed to WWE, where he performs on the Raw brand under the ring name Montez Ford and is one-half of The Street Profits alongside Angelo Dawkins.

== Early life ==
Kenneth Crawford was born in Chicago, Illinois on May 31, 1990. He was raised by a single mother in Chicago's South Side, and later in Anson County, North Carolina. He joined the United States Marine Corps and accumulated a perfect 300 score in the Marines physical fitness test. From September 2008 to 2012, he served in the United States Marine Corps and worked as a contractor for the United States Navy.

== Professional wrestling career ==
=== WWE ===
==== Training and early years (2015–2016) ====
On April 13, 2015, it was announced that Crawford signed a developmental contract with WWE and would begin training at the WWE Performance Center in Orlando, Florida. He made his in-ring debut during a battle royal at a NXT house show on September 26. On the March 16, 2016, episode of NXT, Crawford made his television debut, where he and Angelo Dawkins lost to The Hype Bros (Zack Ryder and Mojo Rawley) in a tag team match. The pairing was initially a one-off, and he continued to wrestle in tag team matches with other partners. Crawford suffered an injury in May, but returned on the August 31 episode of NXT, losing to Steve Cutler. In December, Crawford was given the ring name Montez Ford.

==== The Street Profits (2017–present) ====
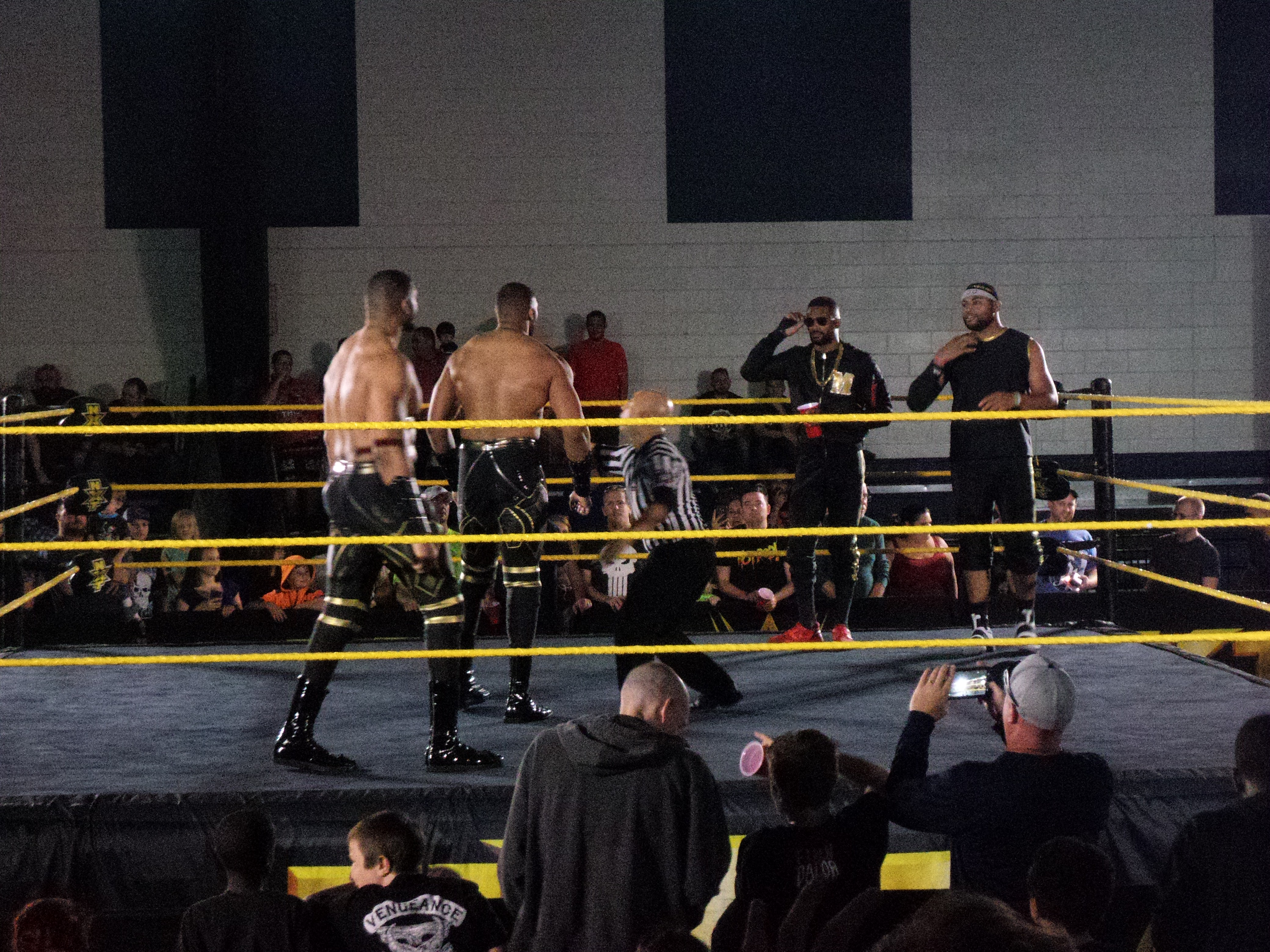
Ford (left) and Angelo Dawkins in May 2017

On the July 12, 2017 episode of NXT, Ford and Dawkins started appearing in weekly vignettes as the Street Profits. On the August 9 episode of NXT, they made their return by defeating The Metro Brothers. After going on a winning streak, the Street Profits suffered their first loss to the Authors of Pain (Akam and Rezar) on the January 17, 2018 episode of NXT. In March, they entered the Dusty Rhodes Tag Team Classic, defeating Heavy Machinery (Otis Dozovic and Tucker Knight) in the first round, but was eliminated by the Authors of Pain in the semifinals.

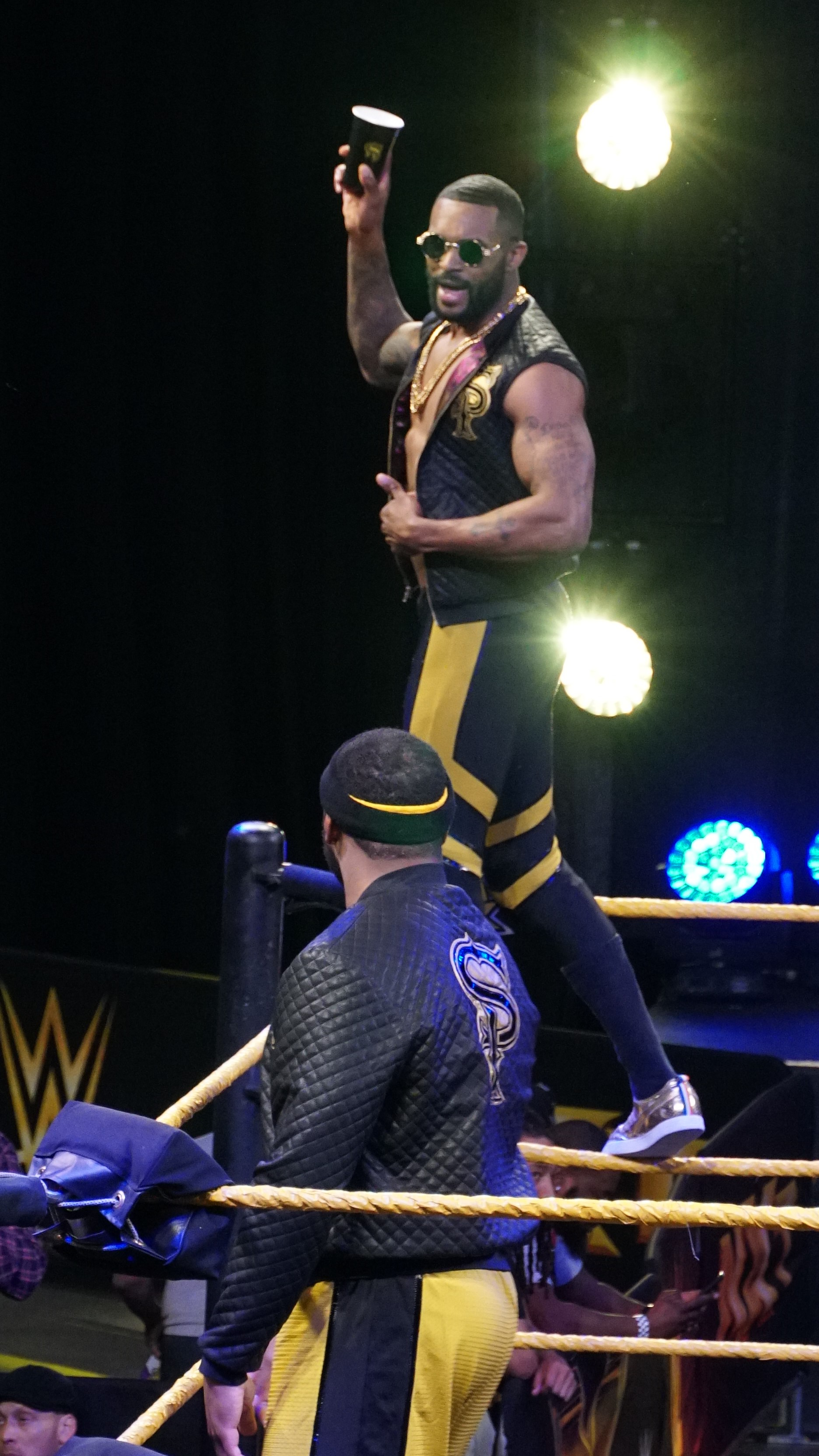
The Street Profits in AXXES in 2018.

On the May 15, 2019 episode of NXT, The Viking Raiders (Erik and Ivar) vacated the NXT Tag Team Championship and were challenged by The Street Profits, but the match ended in a disqualification after interference from The Forgotten Sons (Wesley Blake and Steve Cutler) and Oney Lorcan and Danny Burch. A four-way tag team ladder match for the NXT Tag Team Championship was scheduled for NXT TakeOver: XXV on June 1, where the Street Profits won the titles for the first time. They retained their titles against the Forgotten Sons on the June 26 episode of NXT, Lorcan and Burch on the July 10 episode of NXT and The Undisputed Era (Bobby Fish and Kyle O'Reilly) at NXT TakeOver: Toronto on August 10. On the August 28 episode of NXT, they lost their titles to the Undisputed Era, ending their reign at 88 days, and failed to regain the titles on the October 2 episode of NXT.

Starting on the July 1 episode of Raw, the Street Profits started appearing on the show in various backstage segments, until they were drafted to the Raw brand as part of the 2019 WWE draft. On the October 21 episode of Raw, The Street Profits defeated The O.C. (Luke Gallows and Karl Anderson) in their debut match. At Super ShowDown on February 27, they faced Seth Rollins and Murphy for the Raw Tag Team Championship in a losing effort. On the March 2 episode of Raw, the Street Profits won a Last Chance match with the help of Kevin Owens to win the championship. They successfully defended their titles against Rollins and Murphy on March 8 at Elimination Chamber and Angel Garza and Austin Theory on Night 2 of WrestleMania 36 on April 6. At Backlash on June 14, The Street Profits were set to defend their titles the Viking Raiders, but the match did not start due to them brawling outside the building, being accosted by Akira Tozawa and a group of ninjas and ending up in a dumpster. On the June 22 episode of Raw, they successfully defended their titles against the Viking Raiders.

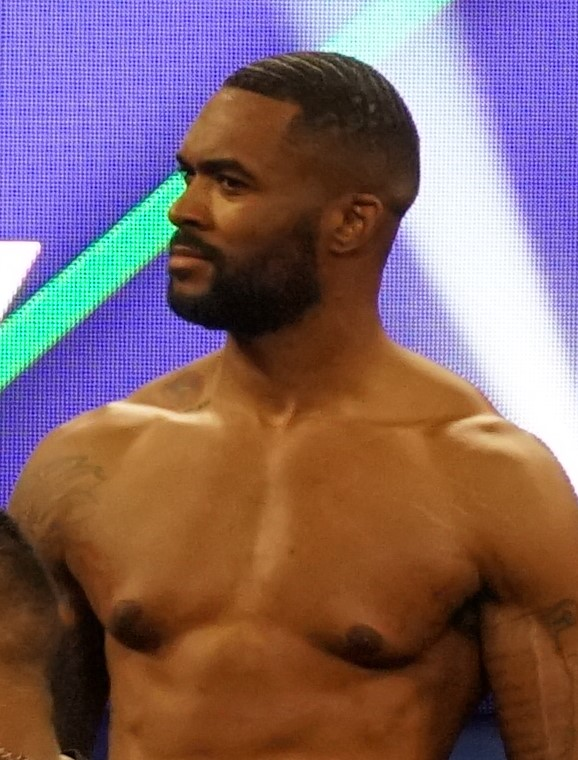
A close up of Montez Ford at a WWE Axxess event in 2018.

As part of the 2020 Draft in October, The Street Profits were drafted to the SmackDown brand. The Street Profits would trade the Raw Tag Team Championship to The New Day (Kofi Kingston and Xavier Woods), who had just been drafted to the Raw brand, in exchange for the latter team's SmackDown Tag Team Championship, making them the second team to acquire the WWE Tag Team Triple Crown. On the December 18 episode of SmackDown, the Street Profits successfully defended the titles against Roode and Ziggler, but lost them in a rematch on the January 8, 2021 episode of SmackDown, ending their reign at 88 days. On the June 11 episode of SmackDown, Ford suffered a partial rib fracture after being attacked by Otis, which was done to write him off television so he could undergo voluntary surgery.

In September, the Street Profits began a feud with SmackDown Tag Team Champions The Usos, but failed to win their titles at Extreme Rules on September 26 and in a Street Fight on the October 15 episode of SmackDown. They faced RK-Bro (Randy Orton and Riddle) for the Raw Tag Team Championship at Day 1 on January 1, 2022, and on Night 2 of WrestleMania 38 on April 3 in a triple threat match also involving Alpha Academy (Chad Gable and Otis), but were unsuccessful. The Street Profits then failed to win the Undisputed WWE Tag Team Championship from the Usos at Money in the Bank on July 2 and at SummerSlam on July 30 with Jeff Jarrett as the special guest referee.

On the February 6, 2023 episode of Raw, Ford defeated Elias to qualify for an Elimination Chamber match for the WWE United States Championship at the titular event on February 18, where he eliminated Bronson Reed and Damian Priest before being eliminated by eventual winner Austin Theory. On Night 1 of WrestleMania 39 on April 1, the Street Profits won the men's WrestleMania Showcase fatal four-way tag team match. Ford faced LA Knight in a Money in the Bank qualifying match on the June 2 episode of SmackDown, but was defeated.

On the July 14 episode of SmackDown, a returning Bobby Lashley appeared in a backstage segment with The Street Profits to recruit them to form an alliance. On the August 4 episode of SmackDown, they interrupted a match between Luke Gallows and Karl Anderson and The Brawling Brutes' Butch and Ridge Holland by beating them down, turning heel for the first time on the main roster. The Street Profits and Lashley teamed up for the first time to face the Latino World Order (LWO) in a six-man tag team match at Fastlane. A day before the event on SmackDown, the trio took out the LWO's Cruz Del Toro and Joaquin Wilde to leave them a man short for the match. At the event on October 7, they lost to Rey Mysterio, Santos Escobar and a returning Carlito. On the November 24 episode of SmackDown, The Street Profits failed to win the Undisputed WWE Tag Team Championship from The Judgment Day (Finn Bálor and Priest) after interference from Rhea Ripley, turning face once again. In early 2024, the Street Profits and Lashley feuded with The Final Testament (Karrion Kross and the returning Authors of Pain) and allied with B-Fab as The Pride. On Night 2 of WrestleMania XL on April 7, The Pride defeated The Final Testament in a Philadelphia Street Fight. On the April 19 episode of SmackDown, Street Profits won a fatal-four-way tag team match to face A-Town Down Under (Austin Theory and Grayson Waller) for the newly renamed WWE Tag Team Championship, but failed to win the titles two weeks later. On August 16, The Pride quietly disbanded due to Lashley leaving WWE.

At Royal Rumble on February 1, 2025, the Street Profits (without B-Fab) cost Motor City Machine Guns (Alex Shelley and Chris Sabin) their opportunity at regaining the WWE Tag Team Championship by attacking them and allowing #DIY (Johnny Gargano and Tommaso Ciampa) to retain the titles, who they also attacked during their celebration. The Street Profits defeated #DIY on the March 14 episode of SmackDown to win the WWE Tag Team Championship for the second time. On the April 25 episode of SmackDown, they successfully defended the titles against #DIY and Motor City Machine Guns in a tables, ladders, and chairs match. On the July 11, 2025, episode of SmackDown, Montez Ford and Angelo Dawkins lost the WWE Tag Team Championship to The Wyatt Sick6 (Dexter Lumis and Joe Gacy).

On the Raw after WrestleMania 42 on April 20, 2026, The Street Profits returned from a six-month hiatus and moved to Raw. The duo intervened during a segment involving The Vision, attacking Logan Paul and Austin Theory to assist Seth Rollins. At Saturday Night's Main Event XLIV on May 23, The Street Profits failed to win the World Tag Team Titles from Austin Theory and Logan Paul after interference from Bron Breakker and Paul Heyman. On the June 22 episode of Raw, The Street Profits defeated Breakker and Theory to win the World Tag Team Titles after interference from Joe Hendry and Rollins. On the July 6 episode of Raw, The Street Profits lost the titles back to The Vision after interference from Maxxine Dupri who joined the stable ending their second reign at 14 days.

=== Evolve (2018–2019) ===
On October 28, 2018, The Street Profits made their first appearance at Evolve 114, winning the Evolve Tag Team Championship by defeating The Doom Patrol. They successfully defended the titles against the likes of The WorkHorsemen, AR Fox and Leon Ruff, Austin Theory and Harlem Bravado, and The Skulk. At Evolve 123 on March 15, 2019, they lost the titles to The Unwanted. The next day at Evolve 124, they made their final Evolve appearance, teaming with Velveteen Dream to defeat The Unwanted in a six-man tag team match.

== Music career ==
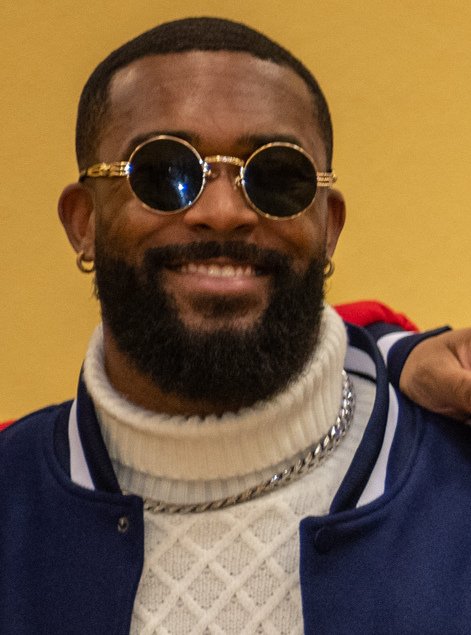
Montez Ford at the Boys & Girls Club January 26, 2023.

In February 2022, Crawford, under the stage name King Tez, released his first mixtape titled LMTYO. On January 1, 2023, he announced that he would release his first album, SYAD, in March. On February 3, 2024, Crawford released his first full-length album, God is Good, with A. J. Francis being featured on some tracks. On May 31, 2024, on his birthday, he released another album, HAPPY BIRTHDAY TEZ.

== Other media ==
On November 1, 2023, it was announced that Ford and Bianca Belair would be having their own reality TV show by the name Love & WWE: Bianca & Montez on Hulu.

As Montez Ford, he made his video game debut as a playable character in WWE 2K19, and has since appeared in WWE 2K20, WWE 2K Battlegrounds, WWE 2K22, WWE 2K23, WWE 2K24, WWE 2K25 and WWE 2K26.

=== Filmography ===
Television
Year	Title	Role	Notes
2024	Love & WWE: Bianca & Montez	Himself	Main cast

== Personal life ==
On June 9, 2017, Crawford announced his engagement to fellow professional wrestler Bianca Blair, better known as Bianca Belair. The couple were married on June 23, 2018. During Night 1 of WrestleMania 42 on April 18, 2026, Blair announced that she and Crawford were expecting their first child together. On August 4, Crawford announced that they welcomed their son. Crawford has two children from a previous relationship.

In October 2026, it was reported that Crawford, WWE, and WWE subsidiary Event Services, LLC were being sued by a security officer who worked on a Raw episode in July. Off-duty Cook County Sheriff officer Noel Lucas is suing for 14 counts including assault, battery, intentional infliction of emotional distress, and violations of the Illinois Gender Violence Act for Crawford (as Montez Ford) performing an unwanted sexualized "lap dance" during the Street Profits's entrance in a live Netflix broadcast that was promoted on social media by WWE. Lucas alleged that he has suffered humiliation, embarrassment, and emotional distress, and that his children were mocked and ridiculed over the incident.

== Championships and accomplishments ==
- Evolve
  - Evolve Tag Team Championship (1 time) – with Angelo Dawkins
- WWE
  - World Tag Team Championship (2 times) – with Angelo Dawkins
  - WWE Tag Team Championship (2 times) – with Angelo Dawkins
  - NXT Tag Team Championship (1 time) – with Angelo Dawkins
  - Second WWE Tag Team Triple Crown Champions
  - RK-Bro-nament (2021)
  - WWE Year-End Award for Breakthrough Superstars of the Year (2019) – with Angelo Dawkins
  - Slammy Award (2 times)
    - Tag Team of the Year (2020)
    - Breakout Star of the Year (2020)
- Pro Wrestling Illustrated
  - Ranked No. 140 of the best 500 singles wrestlers in the PWI 500 in 2021
