= Angelo Dawkins =

American professional wrestler (born 1990)

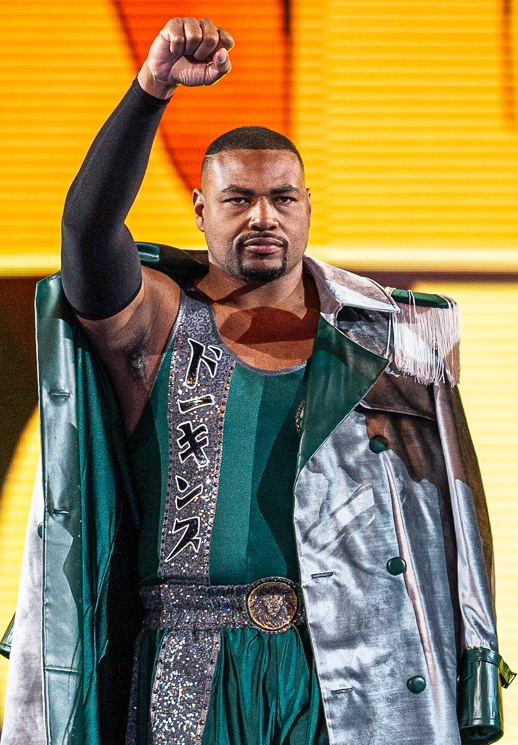
- Dawkins in 2024

Personal information
- Born: Gary Gordon; July 24, 1990 (age 36) Fairfield, Ohio, U.S.
- Spouse: Grace Russo (m. 2024)
- Children: 2

Professional wrestling career
- Ring name: Angelo Dawkins
- Billed height: 6 ft 5 in (196 cm)
- Billed weight: 260 lb (118 kg)
- Billed from: Cincinnati, Ohio
- Trained by: WWE Performance Center
- Debut: December 20, 2012

Gary Gordon (born July 24, 1990) is an American professional wrestler. He is signed to WWE, where he performs on the Raw brand under the ring name Angelo Dawkins and is one-half of the Street Profits alongside Montez Ford.

== Early life ==
Gary Gordon was born on July 24, 1990 in Fairfield, Ohio. During his collegiate days, Gordon was a three-sport athlete, competing nationally in football, wrestling, and track.

== Professional wrestling career ==
=== WWE ===
==== Early years (2012–2017) ====
In October 2012, Gordon signed a developmental contract with WWE and was assigned to the WWE Performance Center, where he took the ring name, Angelo Dawkins. He made his in-ring debut at an NXT house show on December 20, losing to Sawyer Fulton. On the June 19, 2013 episode of NXT, he made his television debut, losing to Sami Zayn. On August 28, 2015, Dawkins teamed with Sawyer Fulton in the Dusty Rhodes Tag Team Classic, but they were eliminated by Enzo Amore and Colin Cassady.

On the March 16, 2016, episode of NXT, Dawkins teamed with Kenneth Crawford in a loss to the Hype Bros (Zack Ryder and Mojo Rawley).

==== The Street Profits (2017–present) ====
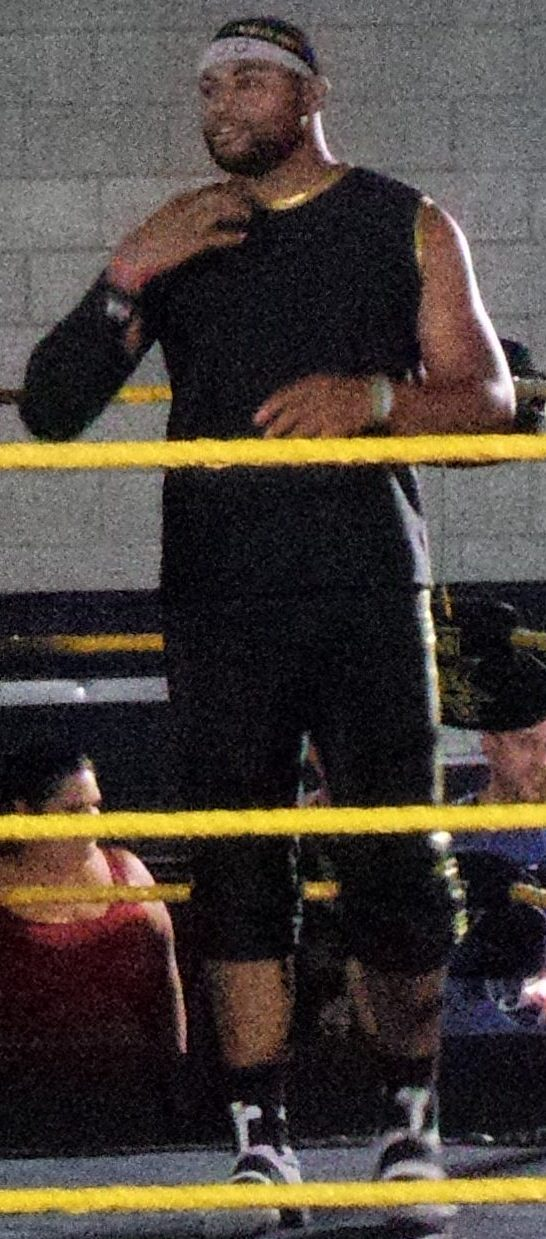
Dawkins in May 2017.

On the July 12, 2017, episode of NXT, Dawkins and Kenneth Crawford, now renamed Montez Ford, started appearing in weekly vignettes as The Street Profits. On the August 9 episode of NXT, they made their return by defeating The Metro Brothers. The Street Profits would go on a winning streak, defeating the likes of The Ealy Brothers, Riddick Moss and Tino Sabbatelli, and local competitors. On the January 17, 2018, episode of NXT, The Street Profits suffered their first loss against The Authors of Pain (Akam and Rezar), failing to earn a shot at the NXT Tag Team Championship. They entered the Dusty Rhodes Tag Team Classic, where they would defeat Heavy Machinery (Otis Dozovic and Tucker Knight) in the first round, but was eliminated by The Authors of Pain in the semifinals. The Street Profits once again entered the Dusty Rhodes Tag Team Classic in 2019, but were defeated by Moustache Mountain (Trent Seven and Tyler Bate) in the first round.

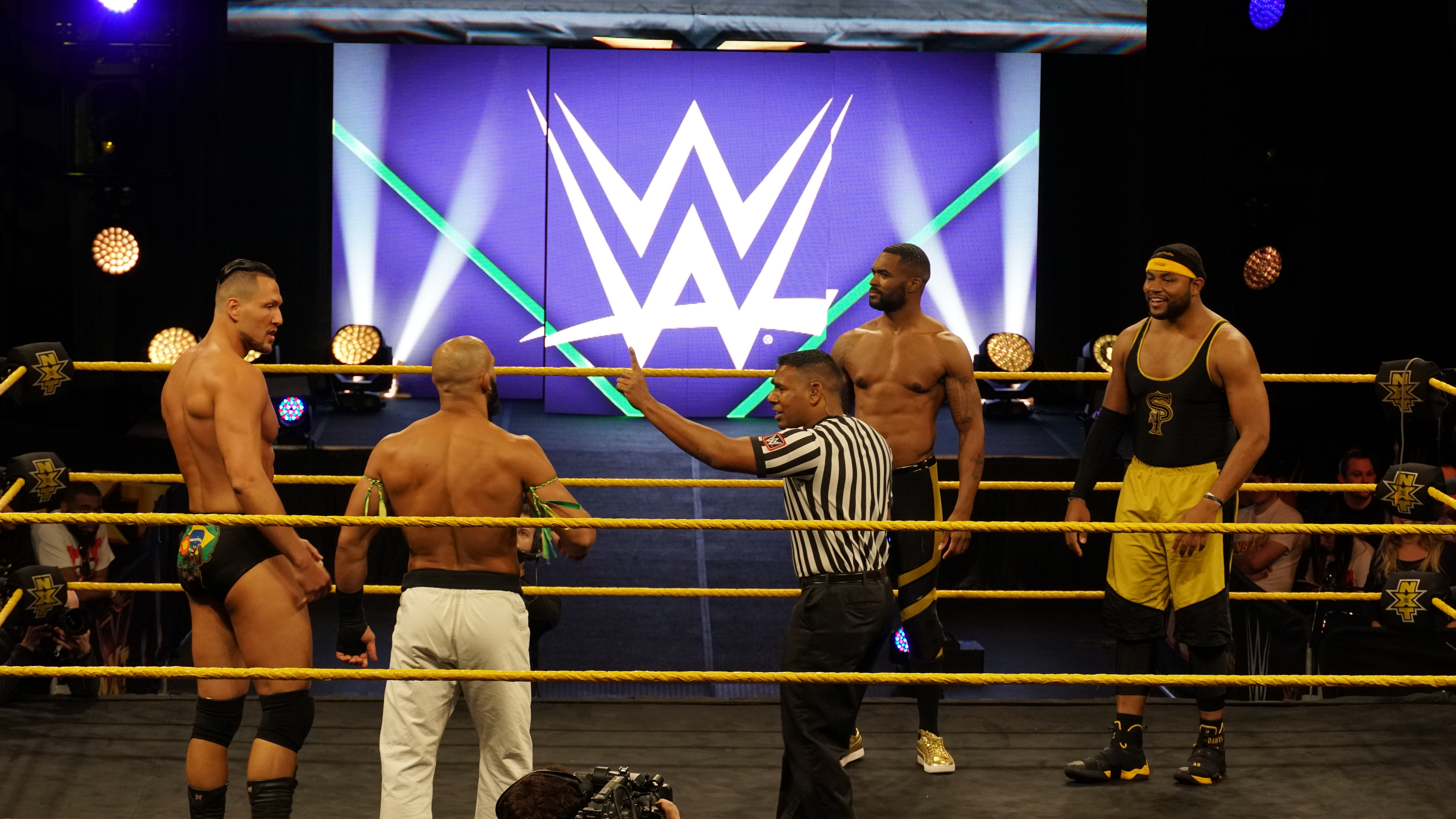
The Street Profits (Angelo Dawkins (right) and Montez Ford (left)) (right) at AXXES in 2018.

On the May 1, 2019, episode of NXT, The Viking Raiders (Erik and Ivar) vacated the NXT Tag Team Championship and were challenged by The Street Profits, but the match ended in disqualification after The Forgotten Sons (Wesley Blake and Steve Cutler), and Oney Lorcan and Danny Burch got involved. A four-way tag team ladder match for the NXT Tag Team Championship was later scheduled for NXT TakeOver: XXV, where they won the NXT Tag Team Championship for the first time. They retained their title against The Forgotten Sons and the team of Oney Lorcan and Danny Burch on the June 26 episode and July 10 episode of NXT, respectively, and against The Undisputed Era (Bobby Fish and Kyle O'Reilly) at NXT TakeOver: Toronto. On the August 28 episode of NXT, they lost their title to The Undisputed Era, ending their reign at 88 days. On the October 2 episode of NXT, they failed to regain the championship from The Undisputed Era.

Starting on July 1 episode of Raw, The Street Profits started appearing on the show and doing various backstage segments, a move that was said to be done in order to appeal to younger audiences. As part of the WWE draft, The Street Profits were drafted to the Raw brand, officially bringing them to main roster. On the October 21 episode of Raw, The Street Profits defeated The O.C. (Luke Gallows and Karl Anderson) in their debut match. At Survivor Series, The Street Profits competed in a 10-team Interbrand Tag Team Battle Royal, where they were the last team eliminated by the eventual winners Dolph Ziggler and Robert Roode. At Starrcade, with Ric Flair in their corner, The Street Profits defeated Gallows and Anderson.

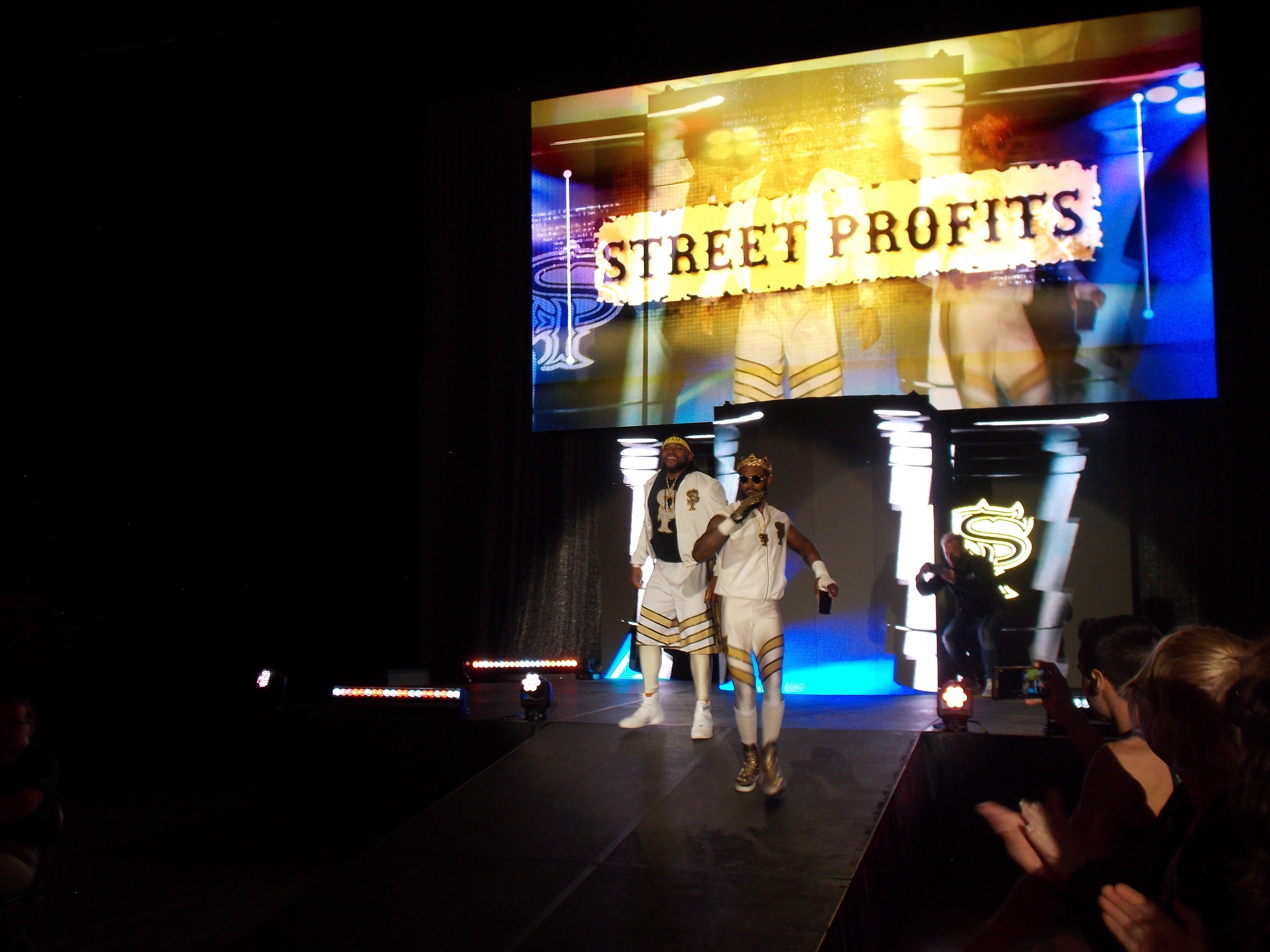
The Street Profits in April 2019.

On the February 17, 2020, episode of Raw, after Kevin Owens and The Viking Raiders defeated Murphy and AOP via disqualification due to Seth Rollins' interference, The Street Profits came out and aided Owens and The Viking Raiders by attacking Murphy and AOP while Rollins retreated. The Street Profits were scheduled to challenge Rollins and Murphy for the Raw Tag Team Championship at Super ShowDown, but they were unsuccessful. On the March 2 episode of Raw, The Street Profits were given a Last Chance match, where, with the help of Owens, they would go on to win the Raw Tag Team Championship. They successfully retained their title against Rollins and Murphy at Elimination Chamber and against Angel Garza and Austin Theory at WrestleMania 36. At Backlash, The Street Profits were set to face The Viking Raiders, but the match did not start due to them brawling outside the building, being accosted by Akira Tozawa and a group of ninjas, and ending up in a dumpster. On the June 22 episode of Raw, The Street Profits successfully defended their titles against The Viking Raiders.

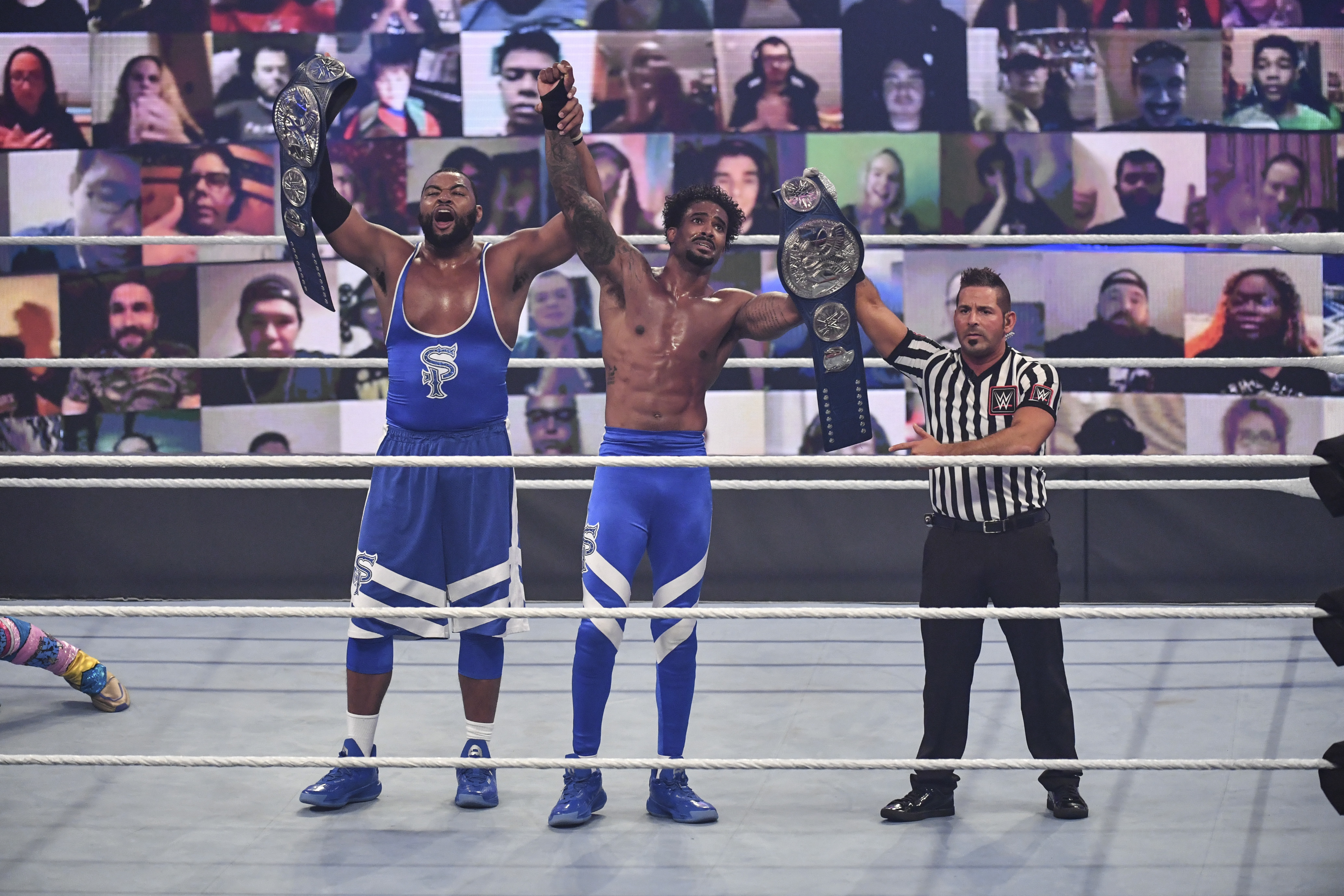
The Street Profits as SmackDown Tag Team Champions in November 2020.

As part of the 2020 Draft in October, The Street Profits were drafted to the SmackDown brand. They would then trade the Raw Tag Team Championship to The New Day (Kofi Kingston and Xavier Woods)—who had just been drafted to the Raw brand—in exchange for the latter team's SmackDown Tag Team Championship. This would make the Street Profits the second team to acquire the WWE Tag Team Triple Crown. They began a feud with the team of Dolph Ziggler and Robert Roode. On the December 18 episode of SmackDown, the Street Profits successfully defended the titles against Roode and Ziggler. On the January 8, 2021, episode of SmackDown, Ziggler and Roode defeated the Street Profits to win the SmackDown Tag Team Championship, ending their reign at a recorded 88 days. On the April 1 episode of SmackDown, they failed to regain the titles in a fatal four-way match also involving The Mysterios (composed of Rey and Dominik Mysterio) and Chad Gable and Otis. On the June 11 episode of SmackDown, Ford suffered a partial rib fracture; the injury put Ford out of action for months. In September, The Street Profits began a feud with SmackDown Tag Team Champions The Usos, leading to a match between the two teams at Extreme Rules on September 26, in which The Usos retained their titles. On the October 15 episode of SmackDown, The Street Profits failed to win the titles against The Usos in a Street Fight.

During the 2021 WWE Draft, The Street Profits were drafted back to the Raw roster. At Day 1 on January 1, 2022, the Street Profits faced RK-Bro (Randy Orton and Riddle) for the Raw Tag Team Championship, but lost. At the Royal Rumble on January 29, Dawkins entered the Royal Rumble match at #10, but would be eliminated. At Night 2 of WrestleMania 38 on April 3, they once again failed to win the titles in a triple threat match also involving Alpha Academy (Chad Gable and Otis). On June 20, Dawkins wrestled in singles competition on Raw and defeated Jey Uso. At Money in the Bank on July 2, The Street Profits failed to win the Undisputed WWE Tag Team Championship from The Usos. Although Dawkins was again victorious against Uso in a rematch on Smackdown on July 15, The Street Profits were unsuccessful in a rematch at SummerSlam on July 30 with Jeff Jarrett as the special guest referee. At Clash at the Castle on September 3, The Street Profits teamed with Madcap Moss to defeat Alpha Academy and Austin Theory during the pre-show.

During the 2023 WWE Draft, The Street Profits were drafted back to SmackDown. On the August 4 episode of SmackDown, The Street Profits interrupted a tag team match between Karl Anderson and Luke Gallows and The Brawling Brutes' Ridge Holland and Butch by taking out the participants in the match, turning heel for the first time on the main roster. The Street Profits then stood on the ramp with the returning Bobby Lashley to celebrate the beatdown. The Street Profits and Lashley teamed up for the first time to face the Latino World Order (LWO) in a six-man tag team match at Fastlane. A day before the event on SmackDown, the trio took out the LWO's Cruz Del Toro and Joaquin Wilde to leave the LWO a man short for the match. At the event, a returning Carlito teamed up with Rey Mysterio and Santos Escobar for the LWO to win the match. On the November 24 episode of SmackDown, The Street Profits failed to win the Undisputed WWE Tag Team Championship against The Judgment Day (Finn Bálor and Damian Priest) after an interference from Rhea Ripley, turning face once again.

On the March 14 episode of SmackDown, The Street Profits defeated DIY (Johnny Gargano and Tommaso Ciampa) to win the WWE Tag Team Championship for the second time. On the April 25 episode of SmackDown, they successfully defended the titles against DIY and the Motor City Machine Guns in a critically acclaimed tables, ladders, and chairs match. On the July 11 episode of SmackDown, The Street Profits lost the WWE Tag Team Championships to The Wyatt Sicks (Dexter Lumis and Joe Gacy).

On the Raw after WrestleMania 42 on April 20, 2026, The Street Profits returned from a six-month hiatus and moved to Raw. The duo intervened during a segment involving The Vision, attacking Logan Paul and Austin Theory to assist Seth Rollins. At Saturday Night's Main Event XLIV on May 23, The Street Profits failed to win the World Tag Team Titles from Austin Theory and Logan Paul after interference from Bron Breakker and Paul Heyman. On the June 22 episode of Raw, The Street Profits defeated Breakker and Theory to win the World Tag Team Titles after interference from Joe Hendry and Rollins. On the July 6 episode of Raw, The Street Profits lost the titles back to The Vision after interference from Maxxine Dupri who joined the stable ending their second reign at 14 days.

=== Evolve (2018–2019) ===
On October 28, 2018, The Street Profits made their first appearance at Evolve 114, winning the Evolve Tag Team Championship by defeating The Doom Patrol. They would successfully defend the titles against the likes of The WorkHorsemen, AR Fox and Leon Ruff, Austin Theory and Harlem Bravado, and The Skulk. At Evolve 123, they lost the titles to The Unwanted. At Evolve 124, on March 16, 2019, they made their final Evolve appearance, teaming with Velveteen Dream to defeat The Unwanted in a six-man tag team match.

== Other media ==
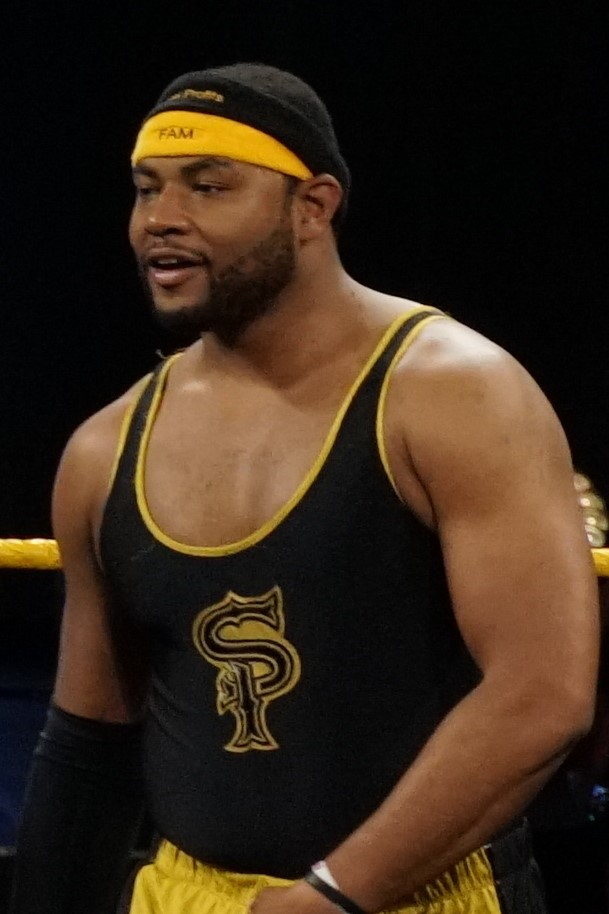
Angelo Dawkins at Axxess in April 2018.

As Angelo Dawkins, he made his video game debut as a playable character in WWE 2K19, and has since appeared in WWE 2K20, WWE 2K Battlegrounds, WWE 2K22, WWE 2K23, WWE 2K24, WWE 2K25, and WWE 2K26.

== Personal life ==
Gordon married Grace Russo on June 30, 2024. They have two sons (born July 2020 and September 2024).

On March 16, 2024, Gordon revealed that his mother had died.

He is an avid supporter of the Ohio State Buckeyes, the Cincinnati Bengals, the Los Angeles Lakers, and Real Madrid.

== Championships and accomplishments ==
- Evolve
  - Evolve Tag Team Championship (1 time) – with Montez Ford
- WWE
  - World Tag Team Championship (Note: During his first reign, the championship was called the WWE Raw Tag Team Championship.) (2 times) – with Montez Ford
  - WWE (SmackDown) Tag Team Championship (Note: During his first reign, the title was referred to as the WWE SmackDown Tag Team Championship, in his second it was named the WWE Tag Team Championship.) (2 times) – with Montez Ford
  - NXT Tag Team Championship (1 time) – with Montez Ford
  - Second WWE Tag Team Triple Crown Champions
  - RK-Bro-nament (2021)
  - WWE Year-End Award for Breakthrough Superstars of the Year (2019) – with Montez Ford
  - Slammy Award (2 times)
    - Tag Team of the Year (2020)
    - Breakout Star of the Year (2020)
- Pro Wrestling Illustrated
  - Ranked No. 152 of the best 500 singles wrestlers in the PWI 500 in 2021
