= WWE Day 1 (2024) =

Television special

Raw: Day 1
- Raw: Day 1 poster
- Promotion: WWE
- Brand: Raw
- Date: January 1, 2024
- City: San Diego, California
- Venue: Pechanga Arena
- Attendance: 11,031

Raw special episodes chronology
← Previous; Raw Is XXX	Next → Raw premiere on Netflix

Day 1 chronology
← Previous; 2022	Next → Final

The 2024 Day 1, promoted as Raw: Day 1, was a professional wrestling television special produced by WWE, held for wrestlers from the promotion's main roster brand, Raw. It was the second and final Day 1 event and aired as a special episode of the weekly series Monday Night Raw on the USA Network. The event took place on New Year's Day on January 1, 2024, at the Pechanga Arena in San Diego, California.

This broadcast kicked off WWE's week-long programming of New Year's-themed shows called New Year's Knockout Week, which included NXT: New Year's Evil on January 2 and SmackDown: New Year's Revolution on January 5. Day 1 was previously held as a premium live event (PLE) on January 1, 2022, for Raw and SmackDown; a second PLE was planned for 2023, but was canceled.

Six matches were contested during the live broadcast. In the main event, Seth "Freakin" Rollins defeated Drew McIntyre to retain the World Heavyweight Championship. In another prominent match, Rhea Ripley defeated Ivy Nile to retain the Women's World Championship and in the opening bout, Nia Jax defeated Becky Lynch. The event also notably featured a surprise appearance by The Rock, which was his first live appearance on Raw since January 25, 2016.

== Production ==
=== Background ===
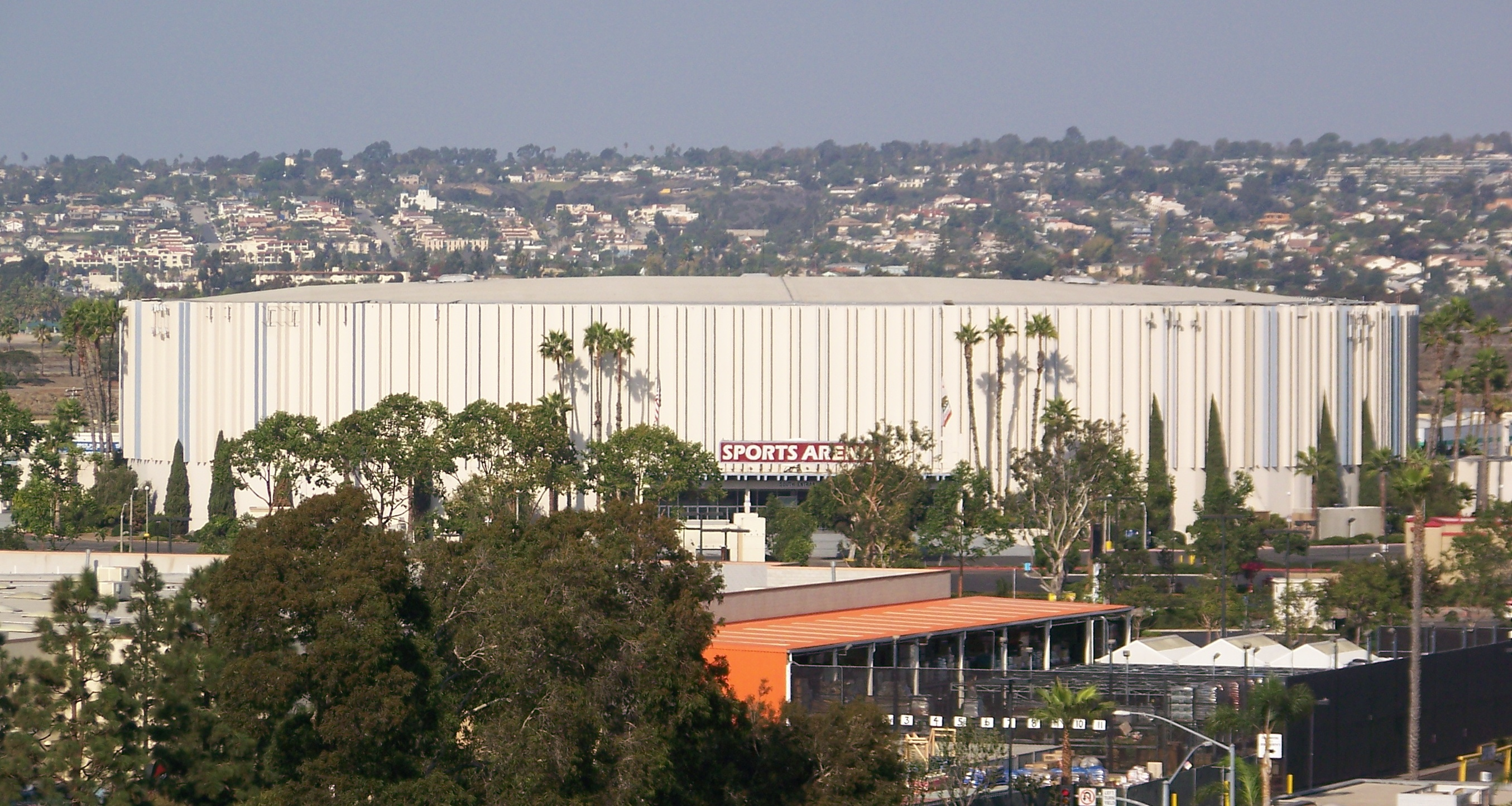
The second Day 1 event was held at the Pechanga Arena in San Diego, California (pictured in 2007 under a previous name of San Diego Sports Arena).

On January 1, 2022, the American professional wrestling promotion WWE held a New Year's Day premium live event (PLE) titled Day 1, which featured wrestlers from both the Raw and SmackDown brands. A second annual PLE was planned for January 1, 2023, but was canceled due to a scheduling conflict with streaming partner Peacock. During the December 11, 2023, episode of Monday Night Raw, it was announced that the Day 1 name had been revived for Raw as a special episode of Raw, airing on January 1, 2024, on the USA Network. The television special was broadcast live from the Pechanga Arena in San Diego, California. The show kicked off WWE's week-long programming of New Year's-themed shows called New Year's Knockout Week, which included NXT: New Year's Evil on January 2 and SmackDown: New Year's Revolution on January 5.

=== Storylines ===
The event included matches that resulted from scripted storylines. Results were predetermined by WWE's writers on the Raw brand, while storylines were produced on WWE's weekly television show, Monday Night Raw.

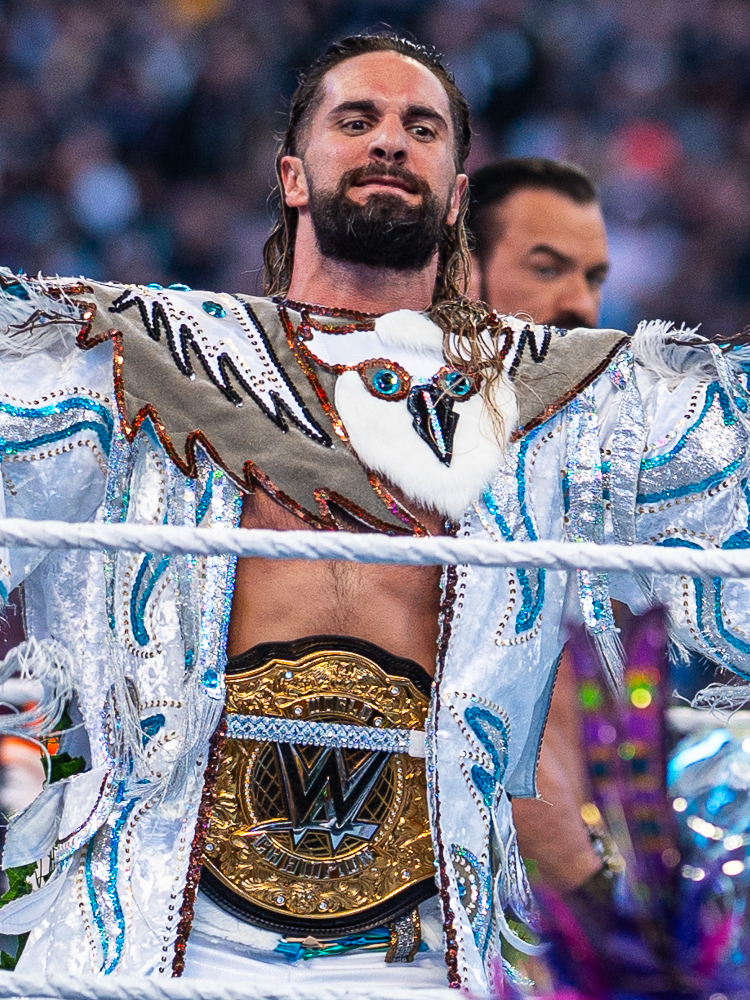
Seth "Freakin" Rollins as World Heavyweight Champion

At Crown Jewel, Seth "Freakin" Rollins defeated Drew McIntyre to retain the World Heavyweight Championship. On the November 13 episode of Raw, McIntyre shook hands with Rollins and stated he would earn a future rematch. On the December 11 episode, Raw General Manager Adam Pearce announced that Rollins would face the now villainous McIntyre in a rematch at Day 1.

On the December 4, 2023, episode of Raw, Ivy Nile promised to neutralize Women's World Champion Rhea Ripley if she tried to interfere on behalf of her Judgment Day stablemates, Undisputed WWE Tag Team Champions Finn Bálor and Damian Priest against Nile's Diamond Mine stablemates, The Creed Brothers (Brutus Creed and Julius Creed) in their title match. The following week, after Ripley defeated Maxxine Dupri in a non-title match, Ripley and Nile engaged in a staredown. Ripley then vowed to make an example out of Nile, agreeing to put the Women's World Championship on the line against Nile at Day 1, which was later made official.

On the November 27, 2023, episode of Raw, Becky Lynch stated she had two fights on the horizon. The following week, Nia Jax asked if one of the fights included her, to which Lynch confirmed, referencing when Jax legitimately broke Lynch's nose in 2018. Over the next two weeks, Lynch appeared ready to face Jax, but Jax stated she would fight Lynch on her own terms, ultimately agreeing to face Lynch at Day 1.

On December 29, 2023, WWE chief content officer Paul "Triple H" Levesque posted on X, which brought attention to a rumor regarding an unspecified former WWE Champion appearing at Day 1. Triple H suggested fans should tune in to the event's broadcast, and refused to confirm or deny the rumor.

== Event ==
The first match that aired was between Becky Lynch and Nia Jax. Lynch applied the Dis-arm-her on Jax, who countered with a sit-out powerbomb for a nearfall. Jax countered Lynch's Manhandle Slam with a Samoan drop on the middle rope for a nearfall. In the end, Jax caught Lynch with a mid-air punch and performed the Annihilator on Lynch for the pinfall victory.

A promo by Cody Rhodes was next. He addressed starting the year stuck on Shinsuke Nakamura “because this should be over,” with Rhodes challenging Nakamura to a match that night. Nakamura appeared on the TitanTron and told Rhodes his story would not end tonight, and that he wanted to give Rhodes one more week to dream.

The next match was a tag team match pitting Kofi Kingston and Jey Uso against Imperium (Giovanni Vinci and Ludwig Kaiser). After Kingston hit Vinci with a dropkick, Vinci did not get up and was tended to by a trainer, thus Kingston and Uso won the match via referee stoppage.

After that, The Miz hosted his talk show "Miz TV", featuring The Judgment Day as his guests. Instead, R-Truth came out and said he was trying to make the Judgment Day likable. JD McDonagh and Dominik Mysterio then appeared and challenged Miz and R-Truth to a tag team match. Miz executed the Skull Crushing Finale on McDonagh for the win.

The following match saw Rhea Ripley defend the Women's World Championship against Ivy Nile. After a back and forth match, Ripley hit Nile with a knee to the face and performed the Riptide on Nile to win the match and retain the title.

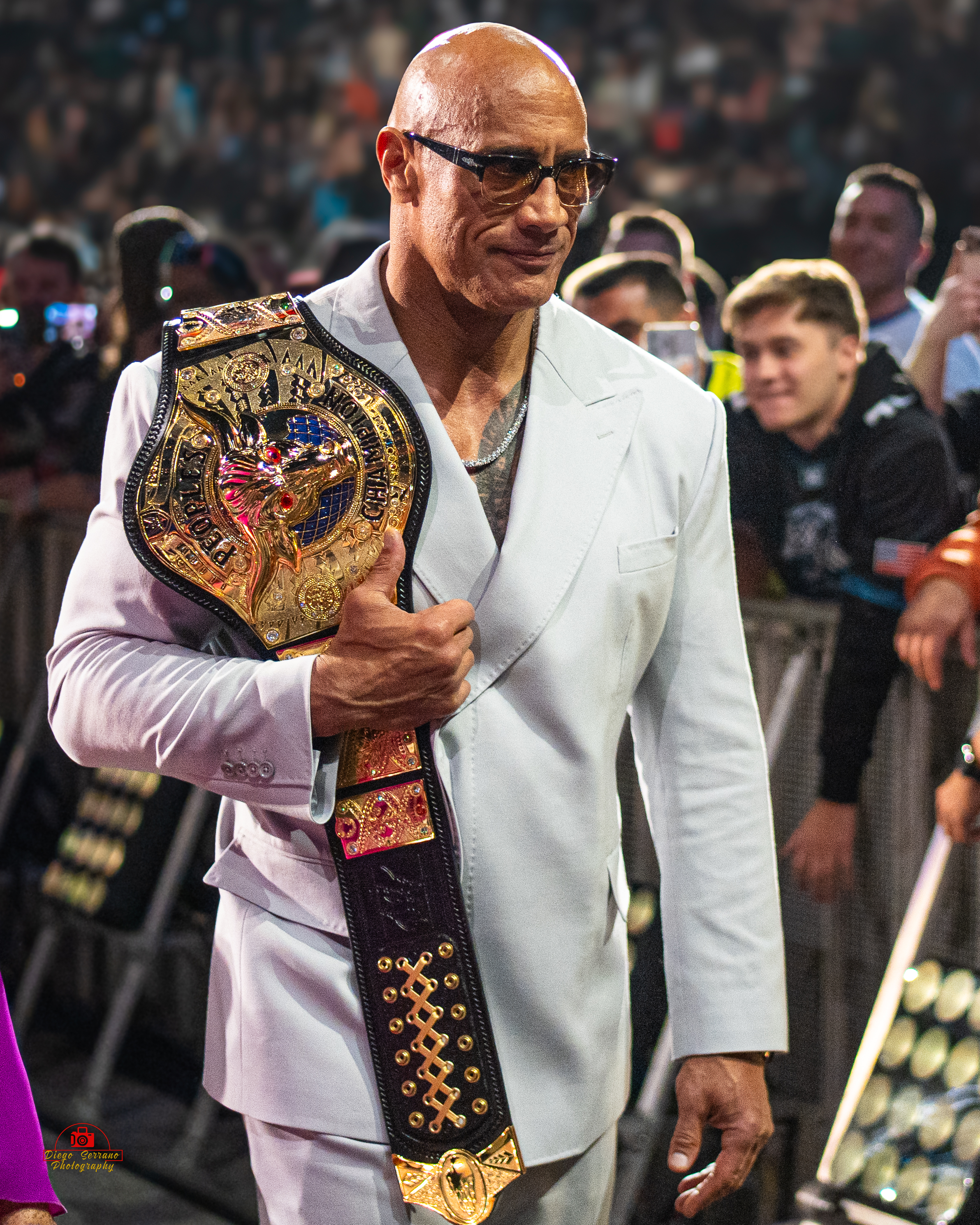
The Rock made a surprise appearance at Day 1

Next, ring announcer Samantha Irvin introduced the former WWE Champion that was previously rumored to appear. After a moment of anticipation, Jinder Mahal made his entrance, much to the dismay of the audience. He cut a negative promo about the United States and its inherent divisiveness and jingoism. This was proceeded by a surprise return by The Rock, who confronted and performed a Rock Bottom on Mahal. After the brawl, The Rock asked the audience if he should sit at "the head of the table", a reference to his cousin, Undisputed WWE Universal Champion Roman Reigns.

The penultimate match was a tag team match, in which Natalya and Tegan Nox faced Shayna Baszler and Zoey Stark. Baszler and Stark executed a German suplex and Z-360, respectively, on Nox to win the match.

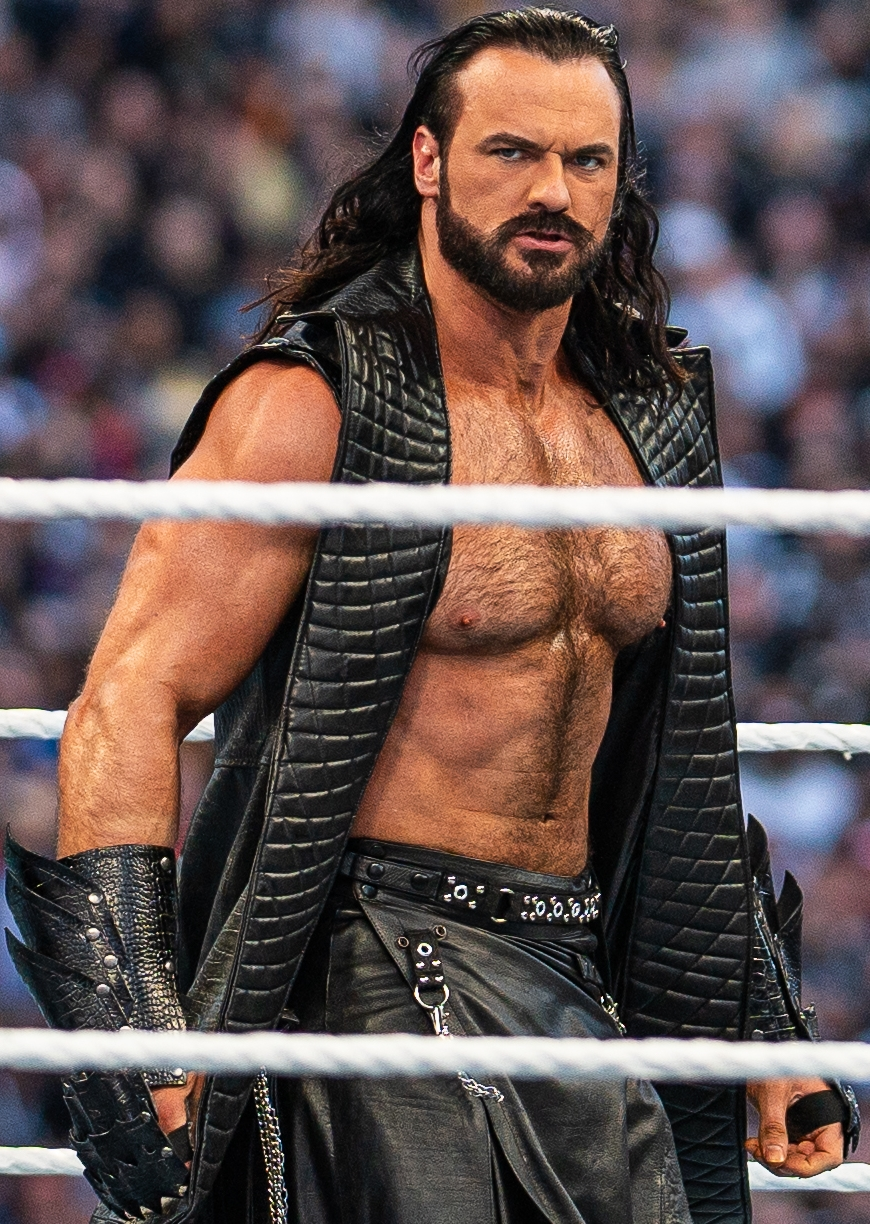
Drew McIntyre, who faced Seth "Freakin" Rollins for the World Heavyweight Championship

In the main event, Seth "Freakin" Rollins defended the World Heavyweight Championship against Drew McIntyre. Rollins went for a suicide dive but McIntyre caught Rollins and hit him with an overhead suplex. At one point, McIntyre went for the Claymore Kick, but Rollins countered it with a sit-out powerbomb for a nearfall. In the climax, Damian Priest appeared and attempted to cash in his Money in the Bank contract, but McIntyre performed a Claymore Kick on Priest and hit Mysterio with an overhead suplex. McIntyre performed a Claymore Kick on Rollins, who placed his foot on the bottom rope to void the pinfall at a two count. Rollins recovered and executed a Pedigree on McIntyre on the announce table. Rollins rolled McIntyre back into the ring and pinned him following a curb stomp to win the match and retain the World Heavyweight Championship.

== Aftermath ==
Following Day 1, Drew McIntyre earned a World Heavyweight Championship rematch against Seth Rollins at WrestleMania XL after qualifying for the Elimination Chamber match at Elimination Chamber: Perth, which he won by last eliminating Randy Orton. On Night 2 of WrestleMania XL, McIntyre defeated Rollins to win the World Heavyweight Championship. After the match, McIntyre taunted special guest commentator CM Punk, who subsequently attacked McIntyre, allowing Damian Priest to cash in his Money in the Bank contract on McIntyre, ending his reign after only five minutes and forty-six seconds.

The Rock made his next appearance on the February 2, 2024 episode of SmackDown, after Royal Rumble match winner Cody Rhodes announced that he would not challenge Roman Reigns for the Undisputed WWE Universal Championship at WrestleMania XL, implying The Rock would be Reigns' opponent instead. This development drew backlash for disrupting the long-term storyline between Rhodes and Reigns. During the following week's WrestleMania XL Kickoff media event, Rhodes announced he would face Reigns and was involved in a confrontation with The Rock, bringing up each other's families, leading to The Rock turning heel by slapping Rhodes in the face and joining The Bloodline, a stable led by Reigns. On Night 1 of WrestleMania XL, Reigns and The Rock defeated Rhodes and Rollins in a tag team match, which meant the Undisputed WWE Universal Championship match on Night 2 was held under Bloodline Rules. The Rock interfered in the match by hitting John Cena with a Rock Bottom, before he was chokeslammed by The Undertaker. Rollins also appeared to help Rhodes defeat Reigns to win the Undisputed WWE Universal Championship.

== Results ==
No.	Results	Stipulations	Times
1	Nia Jax defeated Becky Lynch by pinfall	Singles match	11:50
2	Kofi Kingston and Jey Uso defeated Imperium (Giovanni Vinci and Ludwig Kaiser) by referee stoppage	Tag team match	7:00
3	The Awesome Truth (R-Truth and The Miz) defeated The Judgment Day (JD McDonagh and "Dirty" Dominik Mysterio) by pinfall	Tag team match	7:30
4	Rhea Ripley (c) defeated Ivy Nile by pinfall	Singles match for the Women's World Championship	13:00
5	Shayna Baszler and Zoey Stark defeated Tegan Nox and Natalya by pinfall	Tag team match	5:30
6	Seth "Freakin" Rollins (c) defeated Drew McIntyre by pinfall	Singles match for the World Heavyweight Championship	18:05
(c) / – the champion(s) heading into the match
