= WWE Day 1 (2022) =

Professional wrestling premium live event

Day 1
- Promotional poster featuring Roman Reigns
- Promotion: WWE
- Brand(s): Raw; SmackDown
- Date: January 1, 2022
- City: Atlanta, Georgia
- Venue: State Farm Arena
- Attendance: 11,213

WWE event chronology
← Previous; NXT WarGames	Next → Royal Rumble

Day 1 chronology
← Previous; First	Next → 2024

Day 1 was a 2022 professional wrestling premium live event (PLE) produced by WWE, held for wrestlers from the promotion's main roster brands, Raw and SmackDown. It was the inaugural Day 1 and was WWE's first event to be branded as a "premium live event", a term the promotion introduced to refer to its events airing on pay-per-view (PPV) and WWE's livestreaming platforms. The event's title alluded to its New Year's Day scheduling as it took place on Saturday, January 1, 2022, at the State Farm Arena in Atlanta, Georgia.

Seven matches were contested at the event, including one on the Kickoff pre-show. In the main event, Brock Lesnar defeated Seth "Freakin" Rollins, Kevin Owens, Bobby Lashley, and defending champion Big E in a fatal five-way match to win Raw's WWE Championship by pinning Big E. Lesnar was originally scheduled to face Roman Reigns for SmackDown's Universal Championship, but that match was canceled hours before the event due to Reigns testing positive for COVID-19. In other prominent matches, Edge defeated The Miz, Becky Lynch defeated Liv Morgan to retain the Raw Women's Championship, and in the opening bout, The Usos (Jey Uso and Jimmy Uso) defeated The New Day (Kofi Kingston and King Woods) to retain the SmackDown Tag Team Championship.

This was WWE's only PLE to take place on New Year's Day and was subsequently WWE's first PPV to have the New Year's theme since New Year's Revolution in 2007. The scheduling of Day 1 also caused the cancellation of the TLC: Tables, Ladders & Chairs event, which was usually held in late December. Another Day 1 PLE was scheduled for 2023, but was canceled; however, WWE revived the Day 1 name in 2024 for a special episode of Monday Night Raw; the television special was titled Raw: Day 1 and aired on January 1, 2024. This was also WWE's final PLE to air on the WWE Network in Indonesia before it transferred to Disney+ Hotstar on January 27.

== Production ==
=== Background ===
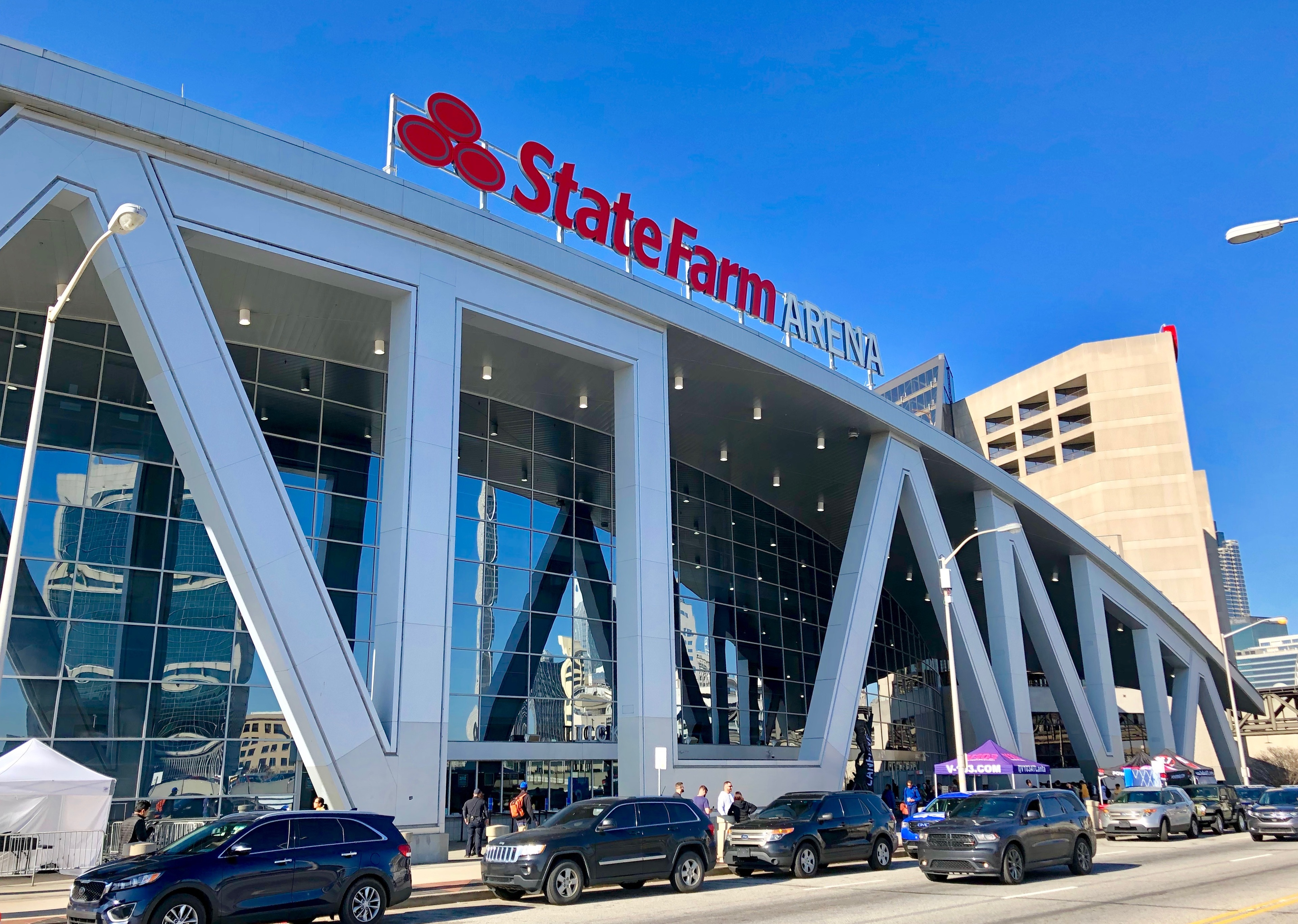
The inaugural Day 1 was held at the State Farm Arena in Atlanta, Georgia.

On July 23, 2021, the American professional wrestling promotion WWE revealed that it would be holding a pay-per-view (PPV) and livestreaming event on Saturday, January 1, 2022, at the State Farm Arena in Atlanta, Georgia, which would feature wrestlers from the Raw and SmackDown brand divisions. The State Farm Arena is the home venue of the Atlanta Hawks of the National Basketball Association, and the announcement was made by the Hawks's all-star point guard Trae Young. Due to the event taking place on the first day of the year, it was titled Day 1, marking WWE's first such event to take place on New Year's Day. The idea for Day 1 was conceived by WWE president Nick Khan. The company previously ran a New Year's-themed PPV event called New Year's Revolution from 2005 to 2007, but each of its events were held shortly after New Year's Day.

On the day of the event, WWE introduced the term "premium live event" (PLE). It was subsequently revealed that this was a term to refer to WWE's events that are available on PPV and via livestreaming, which at the time was on Peacock in the United States, SonyLIV in India, and the WWE Network in most international markets. Day 1 was in turn the first event branded as a PLE. Tickets for the event went on sale on August 27, 2021. One of the official theme songs was "Straightenin" by the hip hop trio Migos. On December 10, 2021, WWE announced that the trio would be making a special appearance at Day 1.

The scheduling of Day 1 caused WWE to cancel its annual TLC: Tables, Ladders & Chairs event for Raw and SmackDown, which had been scheduled for December 19, 2021. Wrestling journalist Dave Meltzer reported that TLC was canceled to allow WWE to focus on Day 1 after November's Survivor Series. There would have also only been two weeks between TLC and Day 1, followed by the Royal Rumble in late January.

=== Storylines ===
The event comprised seven matches, including one on the Kickoff pre-show, that resulted from scripted storylines. Results were predetermined by WWE's writers on the Raw and SmackDown brands, while storylines were produced on WWE's weekly television shows, Monday Night Raw and Friday Night SmackDown.

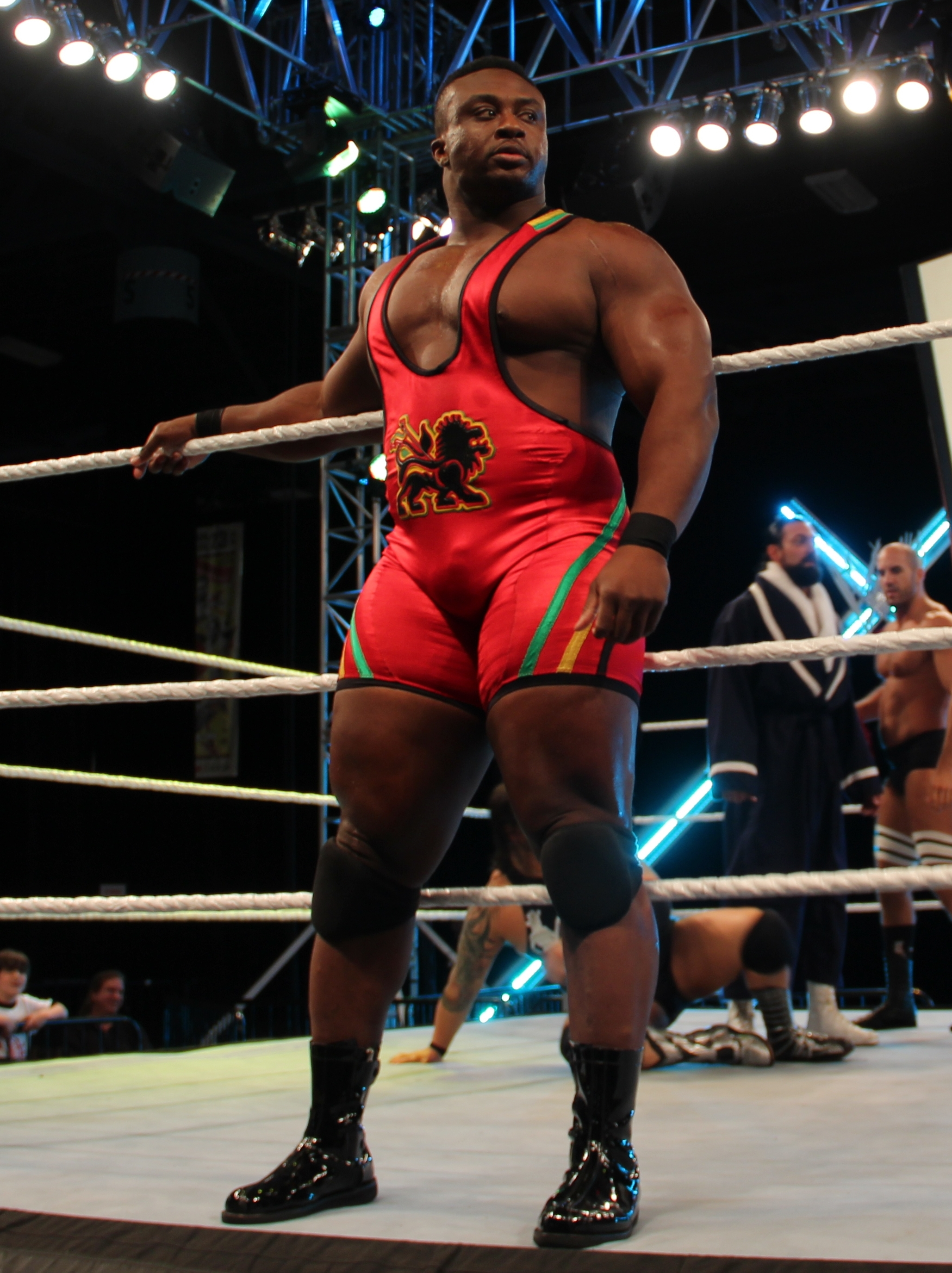
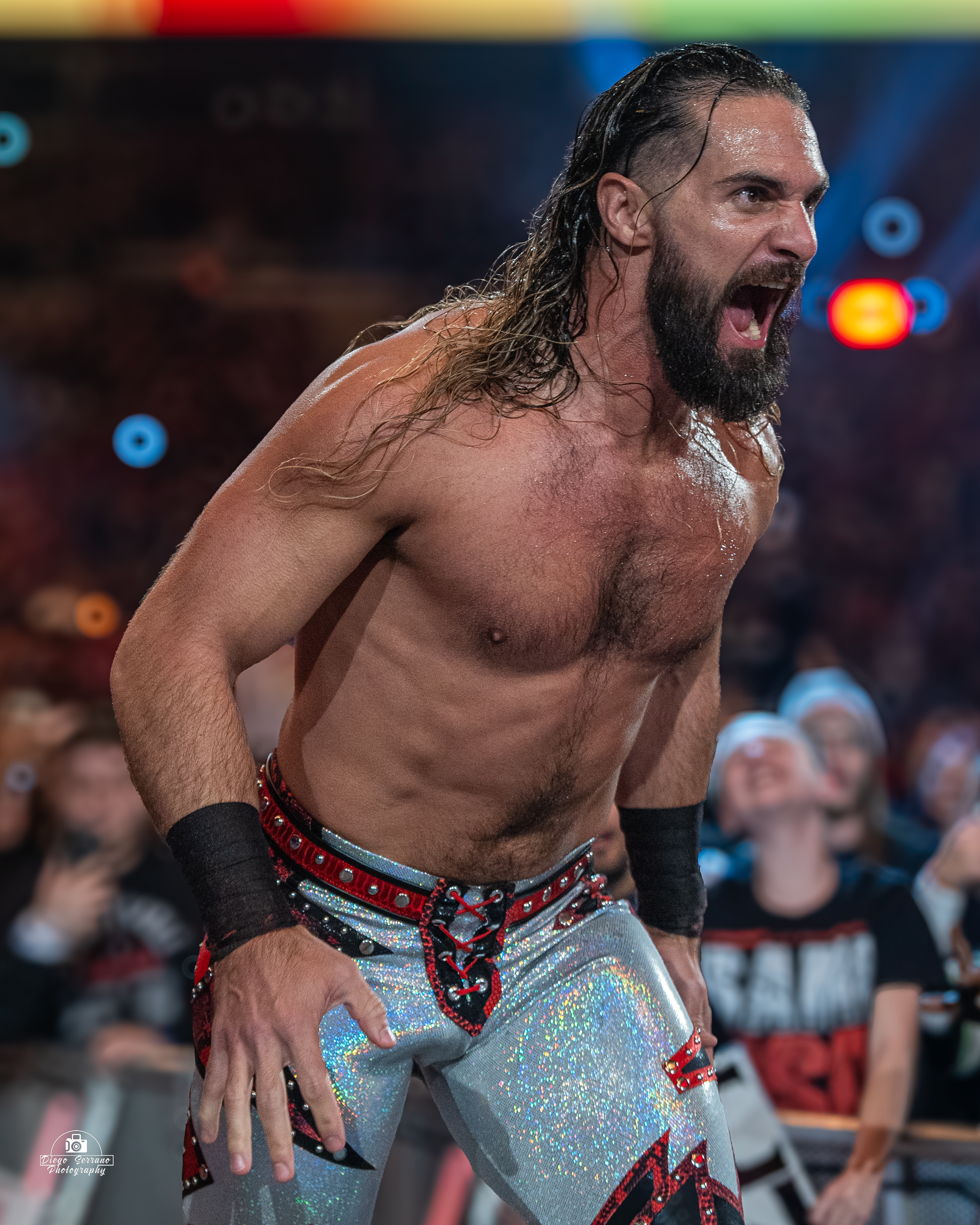
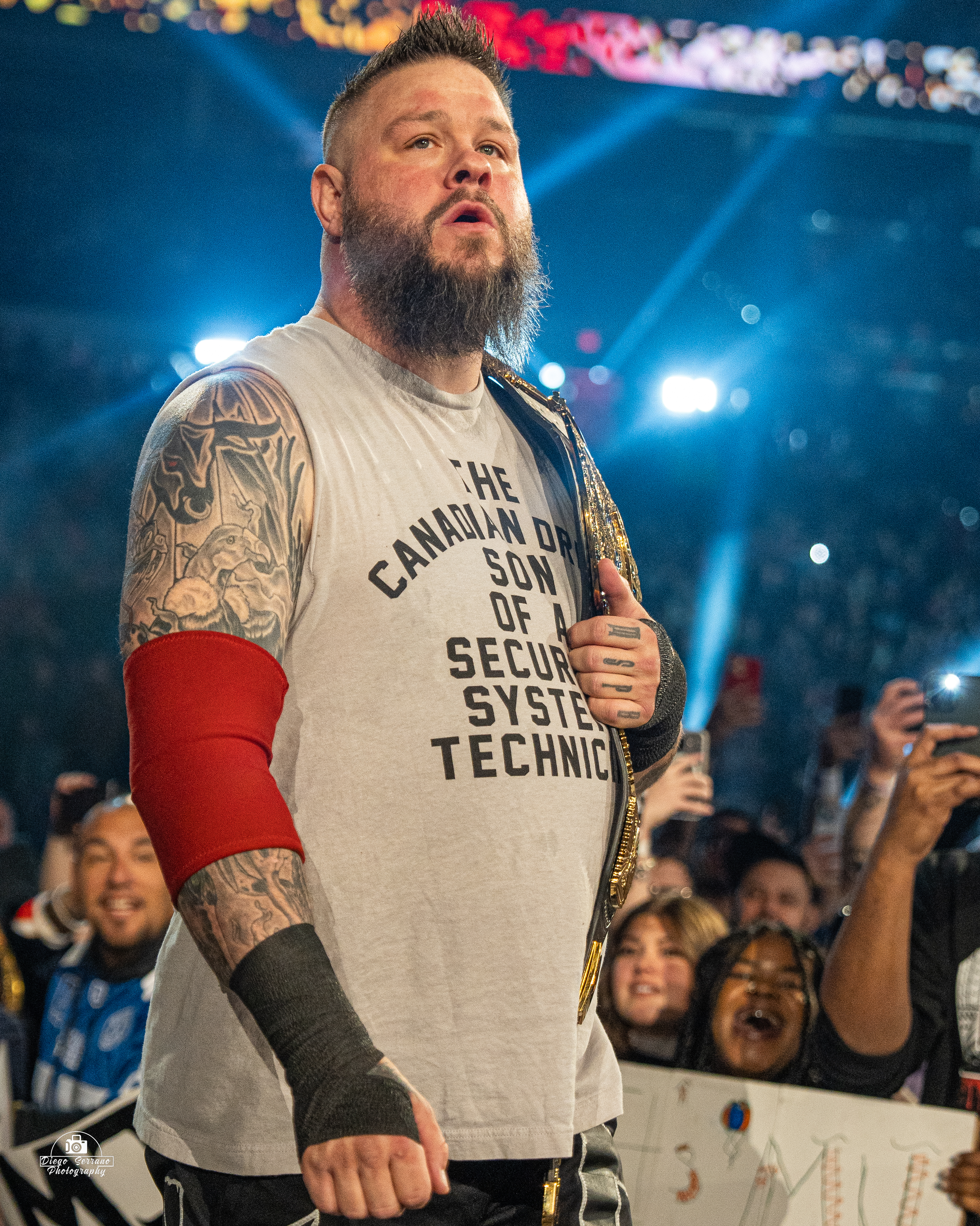
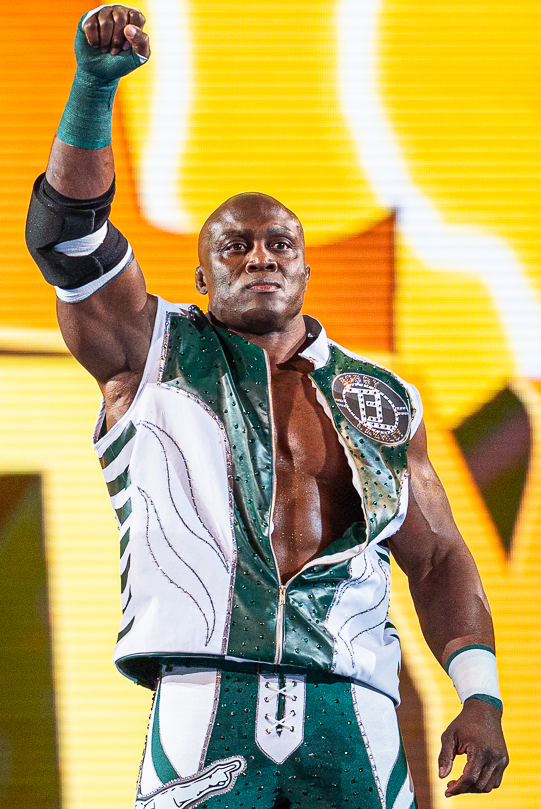
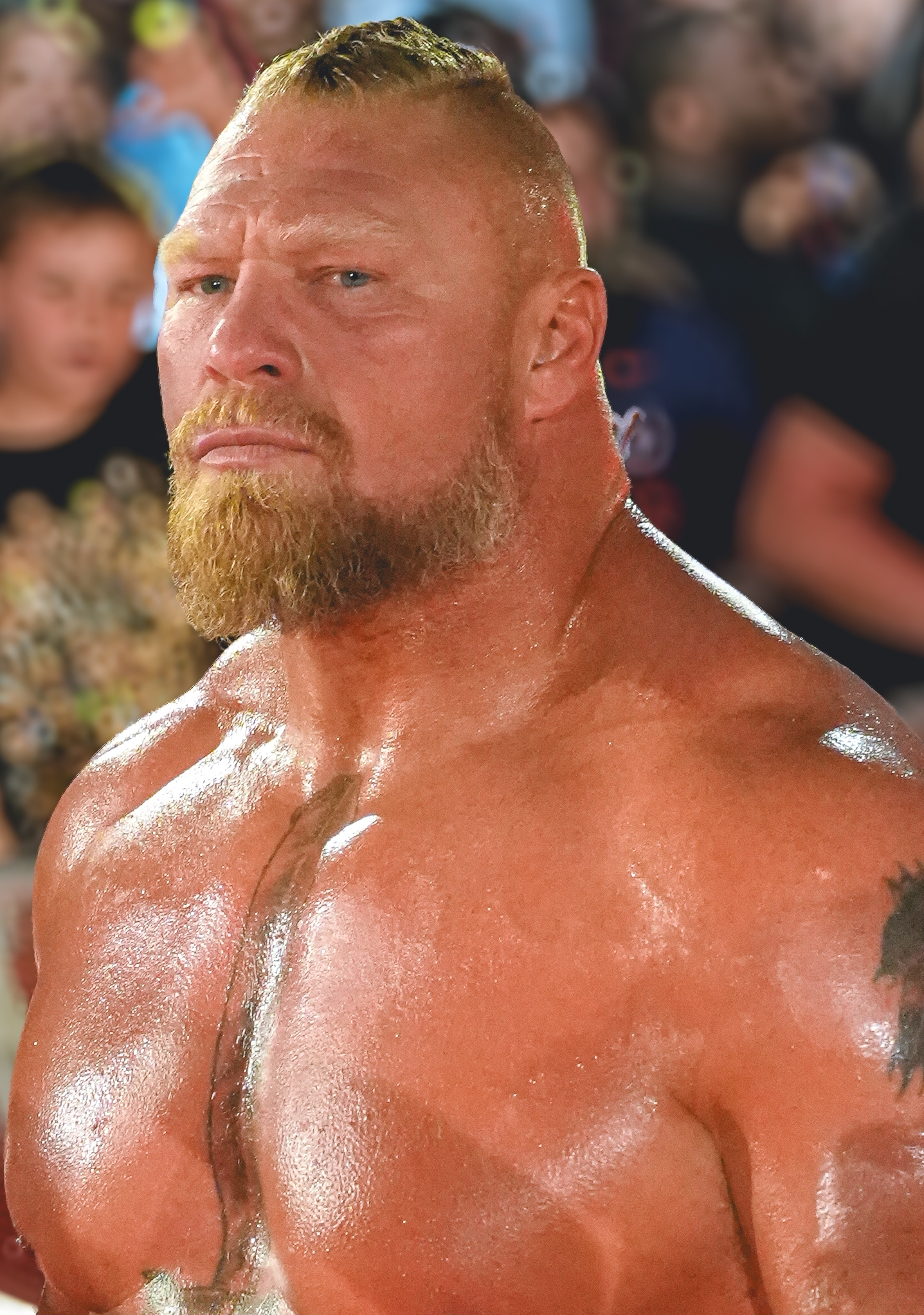
Big E defended Raw's WWE Championship against Seth "Freakin" Rollins, Kevin Owens, Bobby Lashley, and Brock Lesnar in a fatal five-way match.

On the October 25, 2021, episode of Raw, Seth Rollins won a ladder match to become the number one contender for Big E's WWE Championship. On November 29 episode, Rollins announced that the title match would take place at Day 1. That same night, however, WWE officials Adam Pearce and Sonya Deville set up a non-title match between Big E and Kevin Owens, who had also competed in the ladder match, where if Owens won, he would be added to the title match, much to the displeasure of Rollins, who had been at odds with Owens over the past few weeks. In an attempt to sabotage the match, Rollins interfered, thus Owens won by disqualification and was added to the championship match, making it a triple threat match. The following week, after Big E defeated Owens in a Steel Cage match with Rollins on commentary, Bobby Lashley came out and viciously attacked the three. On the next episode, Lashley, who Big E had defeated for the title in September, explained his actions and demanded to be added to the championship match at Day 1; however, Owens and Rollins took exception while Big E stated that it did not matter who he faced as he would still be champion after Day 1. Pearce and Deville then came out and scheduled Lashley to face Owens, Rollins, and Big E, respectively, where if he won each match, he would be added to the championship match. Lashley was successful and was added to the WWE Championship match at Day 1, making it a fatal four-way match. Furthermore, on the day of the event, Brock Lesnar was added to the match following the announcement of Roman Reigns's positive COVID-19 diagnosis that day, thus making it a fatal five-way match.

On November 29 episode of Raw, Edge made his return from hiatus, which was his first post-draft appearance since the 2021 WWE Draft results went into effect on October 22. Edge, who was drafted to Raw, then listed off names of potential opponents he had not yet faced. The Miz, along with his wife Maryse, interrupted, with Miz also making his return from hiatus after filming the 30th season of Dancing with the Stars. Miz felt disrespected as his return was not promoted like Edge's was and also because he was not on Edge's list of potential opponents. After a heated verbal exchange, Miz teased fighting Edge, however, Miz rejected and departed. The following week, Edge was a guest on "Miz TV". After another heated verbal exchange between the two, Miz challenged Edge to a match at Day 1, and Edge accepted.

On November 8 episode of Raw, Liv Morgan won a fatal five-way match to earn a Raw Women's Championship match against Becky Lynch. The title match took place on December 6 episode, where Lynch retained the title by using the ropes as leverage during the pin. The following week, Lynch celebrated her win and insulted Morgan. An irate Morgan then came out, lambasted Lynch for cheating to win, and demanded a rematch at Day 1. The two then brawled where Lynch attacked Morgan's arm using the steel steps. Lynch then accepted Morgan's challenge.

On December 6 episode of Raw, a tournament called the RK-Bronament to determine the number one contenders for RK-Bro's (Randy Orton and Riddle) Raw Tag Team Championship was announced and began that same day, with The Street Profits (Angelo Dawkins and Montez Ford) and The Mysterios (Rey Mysterio and Dominik Mysterio) winning their respective matches to advance. The finals took place on December 27 episode, with The Street Profits defeating The Mysterios to win the tournament, and the championship match was scheduled for Day 1.

On November 26 episode of SmackDown, Drew McIntyre teamed with Jeff Hardy to defeat Happy Corbin and Madcap Moss. Later that night, however, McIntyre was the only one of the four not involved in the battle royal to determine the number one contender for the Universal Championship. The following week, Corbin and Moss hosted a Happy Talk segment where they joked about McIntyre not being in that battle royal before McIntyre interrupted. This allowed Hardy and McIntyre to lay out Corbin and Moss. This would in turn be Hardy's final WWE appearance before his release on December 9. On December 10 episode, before McIntyre's match, McIntyre confronted WWE official Adam Pearce backstage about not being in the battle royal, only to be told that he could not bring his sword, Angela, to the ring for his match. McIntyre then stuck the sword through Pierce's desk. After McIntyre won his match, Corbin and Moss stole the desk and sword. The following week, Corbin and Moss hosted another segment of Happy Talk, where they told terrible jokes about McIntyre's sword. They tried to pull it out of the desk, but failed to. Afterwards, McIntyre appeared and laid out Corbin and Moss before retrieving the sword himself. Later that night, a match between McIntyre and Moss was made official for Day 1.

In October 2021 The New Day (Kofi Kingston and King Woods) re-ignited their feud with SmackDown Tag Team Champions The Usos (Jey Uso and Jimmy Uso). On October 29 episode of SmackDown, while Kingston and Woods held a knighting ceremony for Kingston as Sir Kofi Kingston, The Usos interrupted. They told The New Day that they would face them in a non-title match later that night, where The New Day won. The following week, it was announced that Woods would face Jimmy where the loser would have to acknowledge the winner. Woods defeated Jimmy, and afterwards, Jimmy was about to bend the knee, but Universal Champion Roman Reigns, with The Usos, attacked Kingston and Woods. On November 12 episode, Woods faced Reigns in a non-title match, with the stipulations being that if Reigns won, Woods would have had to bend the knee, but if Woods won, Reigns would have had to bend the knee, and if he refused to do so, he would have been stripped of the Universal Championship and banished from SmackDown. Woods won via disqualification after interference from The Usos, after which, they put Woods's King of the Ring crown on Reigns's head. The following week, Woods was again attacked by Reigns and The Usos, who broke his scepter and throne before Reigns stomped on his crown. Later that night, Woods and Reigns's Survivor Series opponent, WWE Champion Big E, also from The New Day, attacked Reigns and The Usos, sending them retreating. At Survivor Series, Reigns defeated Big E. On December 3 episode of SmackDown, Woods defeated Jey via disqualification after interference from Jimmy. Afterwards, Kingston returned and, along with Woods, attacked The Usos, who were able to retreat. Later that night, Kingston stated that he was forced to watch as The Bloodline attacked Woods and broke his crown, and that The New Day would gain revenge by defeating The Usos to win the SmackDown Tag Team Championship at Day 1.

On November 5 episode of SmackDown, Sheamus joined forces with Ridge Holland in a backstage segment. Two weeks later, Sheamus won a fatal four-way match involving Ricochet and Cesaro, who Sheamus pinned, after interference from Holland. The following week, Cesaro defeated Holland. On December 3 episode, Sheamus defeated Cesaro. On December 17 episode, Holland struck Cesaro with a shillelagh before their match, which Holland won. The following week, Sheamus eliminated Cesaro during a gauntlet match to determine the number one contender for the Intercontinenetal Championship, but was eliminated by Ricochet, who was soon after eliminated. On December 30, a match pitting Sheamus and Holland against Ricochet and Cesaro was scheduled for the Kickoff pre-show.

==== Canceled match ====
At Crown Jewel, Roman Reigns defeated Brock Lesnar to retain the Universal Championship with help from The Usos (Jey Uso and Jimmy Uso). On the following night's SmackDown, an irate Lesnar attacked Reigns, The Usos, other wrestlers of the SmackDown roster, and security personnel due to being cheated out of the championship. WWE official Adam Pearce suspended Lesnar indefinitely and Lesnar responded by performing two F-5s on Pearce, who fined Lesnar US$1 million a week later. On November 26 episode, Sami Zayn won a battle royal to become the number one contender for the Universal Championship. Immediately after the match, however, it was announced that Lesnar's suspension was lifted and he would return the following week. That episode, Lesnar convinced Zayn to face Reigns for the title that night. WWE official Sonya Deville made it official and that the winner would defend the Universal Championship against Lesnar at Day 1. Before the match, however, Lesnar attacked Zayn, which allowed Reigns to quickly defeat Zayn and retain the title, officially scheduling Reigns to defend the championship against Lesnar at Day 1. On December 17 episode, as Reigns believed that Paul Heyman was responsible for Lesnar's return due to Heyman formerly being Lesnar's advocate, Reigns fired Heyman as his special counsel, and Lesnar saved Heyman from a beatdown from Reigns and The Usos. On the day of the event, however, the match was canceled due to Reigns testing positive for COVID-19, with Lesnar instead being added to Raw's WWE Championship match due to his status as a free agent.

== Event ==
Other on-screen personnel
Role:	Name:
English commentators	Michael Cole (SmackDown)
English commentators	Pat McAfee (SmackDown)
English commentators	Jimmy Smith (Raw)
English commentators	Corey Graves (Raw)
English commentators	Byron Saxton (Raw)
Spanish commentators	Carlos Cabrera
Spanish commentators	Marcelo Rodriguez
Ring announcer	Mike Rome
Referees	Danilo Anfibio
Referees	Jason Ayers
Referees	Jessika Carr
Referees	Daphanie LaShaunn
Referees	Eddie Orengo
Referees	Chad Patton
Referees	Charles Robinson
Interviewers	Sarah Schreiber
Interviewers	Megan Morant
Pre-show panel	Kayla Braxton
Pre-show panel	Kevin Patrick
Pre-show panel	John "Bradshaw" Layfield
Pre-show panel	Peter Rosenberg
Pre-show panel	Booker T
Pre-show panel	Sonya Deville

=== Pre-show ===
On the Day 1 Kickoff pre-show, Sheamus and Ridge Holland took on Cesaro and Ricochet. During the match, Holland suffered a broken nose after a botched twirl-whirl by Ricochet. Medical personnel arrived and escorted Holland backstage. In the climax, Sheamus performed White Noise on Ricochet outside the ring and back inside, Sheamus performed a Brogue Kick on Cesaro to win the match.

=== Preliminary matches ===
The actual PLE opened with The Usos (Jey Uso and Jimmy Uso) defending the SmackDown Tag Team Championship against The New Day (King Woods and Kofi Kingston). During the match, Jey performed an Uso Splash on Kingston for a nearfall. Kingston performed the SOS on Jey for a nearfall. In the climax, The Usos performed a Double Uso Splash on Kingston, however, Woods broke up the pin attempt. Jimmy caught Woods with a Superkick. Back inside the ring, The Usos performed the 1D (which was The Dudley Boyz's 3D finisher) on Kingston to retain the title.

Next, Drew McIntyre took on Madcap Moss (accompanied by Happy Corbin). In the end, McIntyre performed the Claymore Kick on Moss to win the match.

After that, RK-Bro (Randy Orton and Riddle) defended the Raw Tag Team Championship against The Street Profits (Angelo Dawkins and Montez Ford). In the closing moments, Riddle threw Ford in the air and Orton performed an RKO on Ford to retain the titles. Special guests Migos were at ringside for the match and celebrated with RK-Bro after the match.

Backstage, while Drew McIntyre was being interviewed following his victory, Happy Corbin and Madcap Moss attacked McIntyre from behind with a steel chair. Moss placed the chair around McIntyre's neck and Corbin struck the chair using a metal tress, injuring McIntyre's neck.

In the fourth match, Edge took on The Miz (accompanied by Maryse). During the match, Miz applied the figure four leglock, only for Edge to touch the ring rope to void the submission. As Edge applied a Crossface on Miz, Maryse placed Miz's foot on the bottom rope to void the submission. As Edge attempted a Spear, Miz avoided Edge and performed the Skull Crushing Finale on Edge for a nearfall. In the closing moments, as Maryse was distracting the referee, WWE Hall of Famer and Edge's wife Beth Phoenix came out and chased Maryse backstage. Edge performed a Spear on Miz to win the match.

In the penultimate match, Becky Lynch defended the Raw Women's Championship against Liv Morgan. Early in the match, Morgan applied the Dis-Arm-Her on Lynch, who touched the ring ropes to void the submission. Morgan performed a Sunset Flip Powerbomb on Lynch for a nearfall. At ringside, Morgan trapped Lynch's arm into the steel steps and kicked the steps, as Lynch had done to her a few weeks prior. Back in the ring, Morgan continued to stomp on Lynch in the corner targeting her arm. In the end, Morgan attempted the Oblivion, but Lynch countered and performed the Manhandle Slam on Morgan to retain the title.

=== Main event ===
In the main event, Big E defended the WWE Championship in a fatal five-way match against Seth "Freakin" Rollins, Bobby Lashley, Kevin Owens, and Brock Lesnar. During the match, Lesnar performed multiple German Suplexes on the other wrestlers except Lashley. Big E performed a clothesline on Lesnar taking him out of the ring. Lashley then performed a Spear on Lesnar through the barricade near the timekeepers area. Rollins performed a Suicide Dive on Lesnar followed by Rollins and Owens performing Frog Splashes on Lesnar temporarily taking Lesnar out. Big E performed a Powerbomb on Lashley through the announce table. In the ring, Owens performed the Pop-up Powerbomb on Big E for a nearfall. Lesnar returned to the ring and performed F-5s on Rollins, Owens, and Big E. Lashley then performed a Spear on Lesnar for a nearfall. As Lashley applied the Hurt Lock on Lesnar, Big E broke it up. Big E attempted a Big Ending on Lesnar, but Lesnar reversed into an F-5 and pinned Big E to win the WWE Championship for a sixth time.

== Reception ==
Dave Meltzer awarded the SmackDown Tag Team Championship match 4 stars, the highest of the night, while the lowest would be Cesaro and Ricochet vs. Sheamus and Ridge Holland which received 2.5 stars. Elsewhere, the main event received 3.75 stars, both Becky Lynch vs. Liv Morgan and the Raw Tag Team Championship match received 3.25 stars, and both Drew McIntyre vs. Madcap Moss and Edge vs. The Miz received 2.75 stars.

== Aftermath ==
This would be WWE's final PLE to livestream on the WWE Network in Indonesia, as on January 27, it was announced that The Walt Disney Company and WWE inked a multi-year deal to make Disney+ Hotstar its exclusive home for WWE Network in Indonesia beginning that same day.

=== Raw ===
On the following episode of Raw, new WWE Champion Brock Lesnar reunited with Paul Heyman, who announced that Lesnar's first challenger for the title would be determined by Day 1's originally scheduled fatal four-way match between Bobby Lashley, Kevin Owens, Seth "Freakin" Rollins, and Big E. Lashley won the bout to face Lesnar for the WWE Championship at the Royal Rumble. The following week, Big E and Rollins had their singles match, which was won by Rollins.

Also on the following Raw, The Miz and Maryse berated Edge and Beth Phoenix, after Phoenix had distracted Miz at Day 1. Edge and Phoenix then challenged Miz and Maryse to a mixed tag team match at the Royal Rumble. Miz accepted, despite Maryse's displeasure.

Liv Morgan interrupted Raw Women's Champion Becky Lynch and wanted another rematch at the title. Bianca Belair interrupted, also staking a claim to a title match. Doudrop confronted WWE officials Adam Pearce and Sonya Deville for an opportunity at the title. Deville and Pearce scheduled Morgan, Belair, and Doudrop to face each other in a triple threat match the following week to determine Lynch's challenger for the title at the Royal Rumble, which was won by Doudrop.

=== SmackDown ===
Universal Champion Roman Reigns opened the following episode of SmackDown, only for his originally scheduled Day 1 opponent and new WWE Champion, Brock Lesnar, along with Paul Heyman, to interrupt him. Lesnar challenged Reigns to a champion vs. champion match, however, Reigns declined and then responded with a Superman Punch on Lesnar. Reigns and a double crossing Heyman cost Lesnar the WWE Championship at the Royal Rumble. Lesnar then won the men's Royal Rumble match and chose to challenge Reigns for the Universal Championship at WrestleMania 38 on the following Raw. Still wanting it to be a champion vs. champion match, and also wanting a rematch for losing his title, Lesnar was also added to the WWE Championship Elimination Chamber match at Elimination Chamber, which he won. This converted his Universal Championship match against Reigns at WrestleMania into a Winner Takes All match, which was later stipulated as a championship unification match.

Also on the following episode of SmackDown, The Usos again retained the SmackDown Tag Team Championship against The New Day (Kofi Kingston and King Woods), this time in a street fight.

Drew McIntyre was reported to require surgery on his neck, however, he made a surprise return at the Royal Rumble during the men's Royal Rumble match and eliminated Happy Corbin and Madcap Moss. Due to them almost ending his career, McIntyre declared he would continue targeting Corbin and Moss, and a rematch between McIntyre and Moss was scheduled for Elimination Chamber, which was later stipulated as a Falls Count Anywhere match.

In response to Ricochet breaking Ridge Holland's nose at Day 1, Sheamus faced and defeated Ricochet on January 14 episode of SmackDown. The following week, Sheamus (accompanied by Holland, who returned from his injury) defeated Ricochet in a rematch. On January 28 episode, Sheamus and Holland, the latter wearing a protective face mask, defeated Ricochet and Cesaro in a rematch from Day 1. The following week, Ricochet quickly defeated Holland, after which, a tag team match began immediately afterwards, where Sheamus and Holland again defeated Ricochet and Cesaro to end the feud.

=== Future ===
Day 1 was scheduled to return to the State Farm Arena on January 1, 2023, and become an annual New Year's Day event for WWE. However, on October 16, 2022, it was reported that the 2023 event was canceled due to conflicts involving streaming partner Peacock's simulcast of a scheduled Sunday Night Football game that was televised by NBC on the night of the event. While WWE did not officially announce the cancellation, a WWE Live event was instead scheduled to be held at the State Farm Arena on December 27, 2022, and then during Survivor Series: WarGames on November 26, the annual Royal Rumble event was promoted as the company's first PLE of 2023.

During the December 11, 2023, episode of Raw, it was announced that the Day 1 name had been revived for a special episode of Raw titled Raw: Day 1, with the television special airing on January 1, 2024.

== Results ==
No.	Results	Stipulations	Times
1^{P}	Sheamus and Ridge Holland defeated Cesaro and Ricochet by pinfall	Tag team match	9:45
2	The Usos (Jey Uso and Jimmy Uso) (c) defeated The New Day (Kofi Kingston and King Woods) by pinfall	Tag team match for the WWE SmackDown Tag Team Championship	17:05
3	Drew McIntyre defeated Madcap Moss (with Happy Corbin) by pinfall	Singles match	9:45
4	RK-Bro (Randy Orton and Riddle) (c) (with Migos) defeated The Street Profits (Angelo Dawkins and Montez Ford) by pinfall	Tag team match for the WWE Raw Tag Team Championship	11:15
5	Edge defeated The Miz (with Maryse) by pinfall	Singles match	20:00
6	Becky Lynch (c) defeated Liv Morgan by pinfall	Singles match for the WWE Raw Women's Championship	17:00
7	Brock Lesnar defeated Big E (c), Bobby Lashley (with MVP), Kevin Owens, and Seth "Freakin" Rollins by pinfall	Fatal five-way match for the WWE Championship	8:25
(c) / – the champion(s) heading into the match; P / – the match was broadcast on the pre-show

=== RK-Bro-nament ===
1st Round; Raw; December 6, 2021
The Street Profits (Angelo Dawkins and Montez Ford)	Countout
AJ Styles and Omos	9:45
The Mysterios (Rey Mysterio and Dominik Mysterio)	Pinfall
Alpha Academy (Chad Gable and Otis)	3:15

Final; Raw; December 27, 2021
The Street Profits	Pinfall
The Mysterios	12:05
