= WWE Day 1 =

WWE Day 1 may refer to

- WWE Day 1 (2022), the premium live event
- WWE Day 1 (2024), the special episode of Raw which used the same theming
