= Royal Rumble (2022) =

WWE premium live event

- Promotional poster featuring various WWE wrestlers
- Promotion: WWE
- Brand(s): Raw; SmackDown
- Date: January 29, 2022
- City: St. Louis, Missouri
- Venue: The Dome at America's Center
- Attendance: 44,390

WWE event chronology
← Previous; Day 1	Next → Elimination Chamber

Royal Rumble chronology
← Previous; 2021	Next → 2023

The 2022 Royal Rumble was a professional wrestling premium live event (PLE) produced by WWE, held for wrestlers from the promotion's main roster brands, Raw and SmackDown. It was the 35th annual Royal Rumble event and took place on Saturday, January 29, 2022, at The Dome at America's Center in St. Louis, Missouri. This was the second Royal Rumble event held in St. Louis, after 2012 at the Scottrade Center.

The event was based around the Royal Rumble match, a modified 30-person battle royal in which the participants enter at timed intervals instead of all beginning in the ring at the same time and the respective men's and women's winners received a world championship match at WrestleMania. For the 2022 event, the winners received a choice of which championship to challenge for at WrestleMania 38. The men could choose to challenge for either Raw's WWE Championship or SmackDown's Universal Championship, while the women had the choice between the Raw Women's Championship and the SmackDown Women's Championship. After the NXT Championship and NXT Women's Championship were eligible options in 2020 and 2021, their eligibility was removed after NXT reverted to being WWE's developmental brand in September 2021. This would also be the last year until 2025 in which the men's winner had two choices, and subsequently the last year in which the Universal Championship was an option, as at WrestleMania 38, the WWE Championship and Universal Championship were unified as the Undisputed WWE Universal Championship.

Six matches were contested at the event. The main event was the 2022 Men's Royal Rumble match, which was won by free agent Brock Lesnar, who lasted eliminated SmackDown's Drew McIntyre; earlier in the night, Lesnar lost his WWE Championship to Bobby Lashley, becoming the first former world champion to win the eponymous match on the same night he lost the title. This also made him the ninth two-time Royal Rumble winner, first winning it in 2003, and he set a record for the longest time between Royal Rumble wins (19 years) as well as the least time spent in the match before winning it (2:30). The 2022 Women's Royal Rumble match was won by Ronda Rousey, who last eliminated SmackDown Women's Champion Charlotte Flair; this was Rousey's first WWE appearance since WrestleMania 35 in April 2019. In the opening bout, which was an interbrand match, Raw's Seth "Freakin" Rollins defeated Universal Champion Roman Reigns by disqualification; however, Reigns retained as titles do not change hands by disqualification unless stipulated. Notably, Jackass actor/stuntman Johnny Knoxville and reggaeton singer Bad Bunny appeared in the men's Royal Rumble match and reigning Impact Knockouts World Champion Mickie James appeared in the women's. This was also the final WWE event for Spanish commentator Carlos Cabrera.

This was the first Royal Rumble to be branded as a "premium live event", a term the company introduced at the start of the year to refer to its events airing on traditional pay-per-view and via WWE's livestreaming platforms. It was subsequently the first Royal Rumble to livestream on SonyLIV in India, Peacock in the United States, and Disney+ Hotstar in Indonesia, following the shutdown of the WWE Network in those respective markets, with the Indian version closing in February 2021, the American version in April 2021, and Indonesia's just before the Royal Rumble on January 27.

The event received negative reviews from fans and critics, with the men's Royal Rumble being widely panned, while the women's Royal Rumble was criticized for its ending. Despite this, however, the match between Rollins and Reigns was widely praised.

== Production ==
=== Background ===
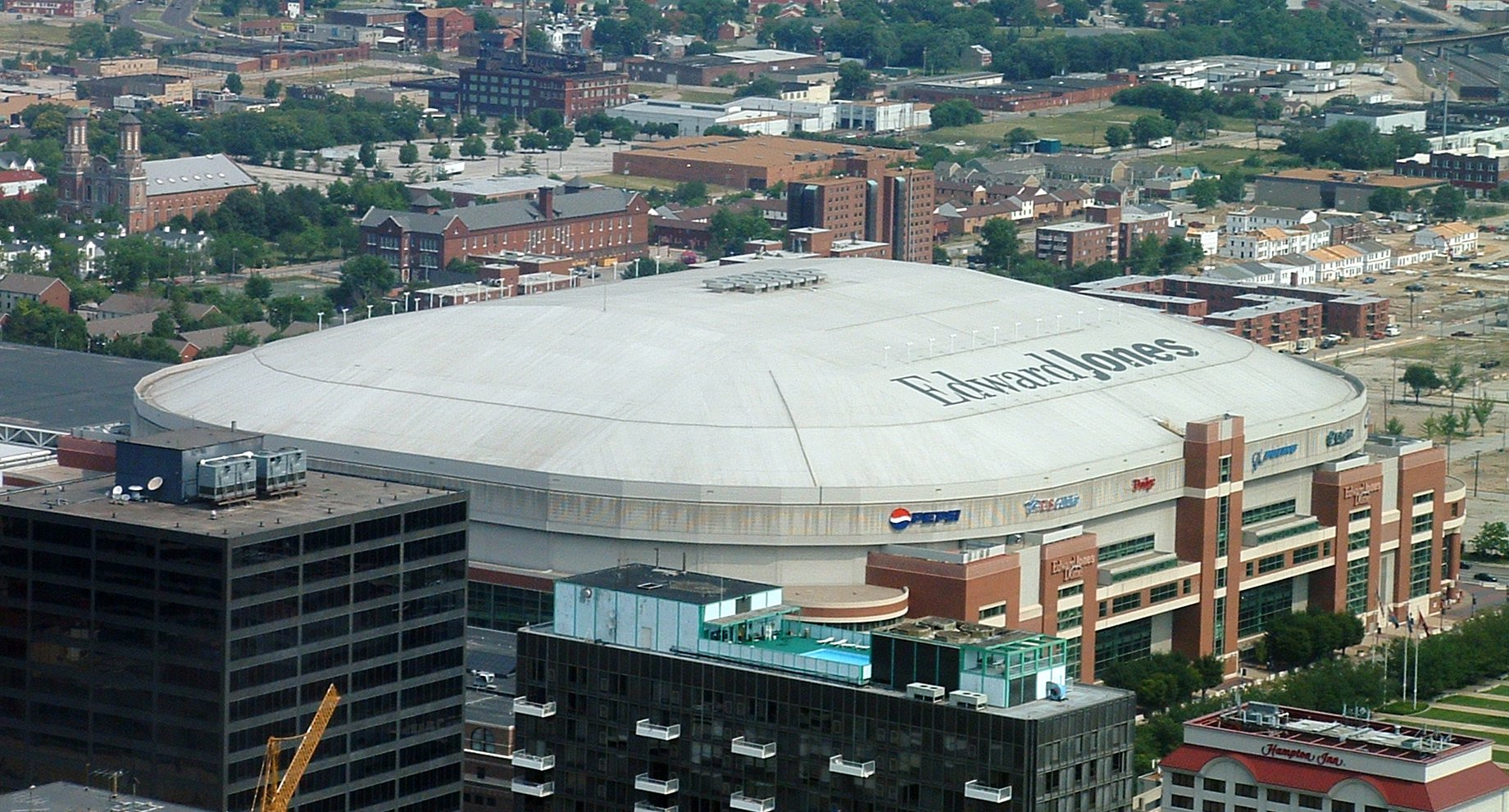
The 35th annual Royal Rumble event was held at The Dome at America's Center in St. Louis, Missouri.

The Royal Rumble is an annual professional wrestling premium live event (PLE), produced every January by WWE since 1988; that first event was a television special before it became a pay-per-view (PPV) event beginning in 1989 and then also available via livestreaming on the WWE Network since 2015. It is one of the promotion's original four PPVs, along with WrestleMania, SummerSlam, and Survivor Series, referred to as the "Big Four", and as of August 2021, it is considered one of the "Big Five", along with Money in the Bank. It is named after and centered on the Royal Rumble match.

Announced on September 27, 2021, the 35th Royal Rumble event was scheduled to be held on Saturday, January 29, 2022, at The Dome at America's Center in St. Louis, Missouri. This was the second Royal Rumble in St. Louis, after 2012 at the Scottrade Center. It featured wrestlers from the Raw and SmackDown brand divisions. Tickets went on sale on October 15, 2022, through Ticketmaster. This was the first Royal Rumble to be branded as a "premium live event", a term the company introduced on January 1 to refer to its events that are available on PPV and via livestreaming.

The Royal Rumble match is a modified battle royal in which the participants enter at timed intervals instead of all beginning in the ring at the same time, and the match generally features 30 wrestlers. Since 1993, the winner traditionally earns a world championship match at that year's WrestleMania. For 2022, the men and women could choose to challenge for either brand's top championship at WrestleMania 38: the men had their choice between Raw's WWE Championship or SmackDown's Universal Championship, while the women could choose either the Raw Women's Championship or the SmackDown Women's Championship. In 2020 and 2021, the NXT Championship and NXT Women's Championship were also eligible options, but in September 2021, NXT was rebranded as "NXT 2.0" and reverted to being WWE's developmental brand, removing their eligibility.

=== Broadcast outlets ===
The PLE was broadcast on traditional PPV outlets worldwide. It was also available to livestream on Peacock in the United States, SonyLIV in India, Disney+ Hotstar in Indonesia, and the WWE Network everywhere else. This was the first Royal Rumble to livestream on SonyLIV and Peacock, following the shutdown of the Indian version of the WWE Network in February 2021 and the American version in April 2021. This was also WWE's first PLE to livestream on Disney+ Hotstar in Indonesia, as it was announced that The Walt Disney Company and WWE inked a multi-year deal to make Disney+ Hotstar its exclusive home for WWE Network in Indonesia beginning January 27, just two days before the event.

=== Storylines ===
The event included six matches that resulted from scripted storylines. Results were predetermined by WWE's writers on the Raw and SmackDown brands, while storylines were produced on WWE's weekly television shows, Monday Night Raw and Friday Night SmackDown.

At Day 1, Jackass actor and stuntman Johnny Knoxville announced that he would be participating in the men's Royal Rumble match. On the following SmackDown, Sami Zayn encountered Knoxville backstage and claimed that Knoxville was not qualified to compete in the Royal Rumble match, nor did he earn the opportunity to be in it. After Zayn lost his match that night, Knoxville ran down to the ring and threw Zayn over the top rope. Ring announcer Mike Rome then announced that Knoxville had officially qualified for the Royal Rumble match, much to Zayn's displeasure.

On the January 7 episode of SmackDown, SmackDown Women's Champion Charlotte Flair revealed 18 of the women who would be competing in the women's Royal Rumble match, including WWE Hall of Famers and veterans, and notably, reigning Impact Knockouts World Champion Mickie James, marking the first time WWE openly acknowledged one of Impact's championships on their canonical programming. Additionally, Flair declared that she would also participate in the match, stating that she would be the first reigning women's champion to win the Royal Rumble. While the winner traditionally earns a championship match at WrestleMania, Flair stated she would instead select her WrestleMania 38 opponent if she won.

At Day 1, Brock Lesnar defeated Bobby Lashley, Seth "Freakin" Rollins, Kevin Owens, and defending champion Big E in a fatal five-way match to win Raw's WWE Championship; this was originally scheduled as a fatal four-way match, but Lesnar was added due to his scheduled match against SmackDown's Universal Champion Roman Reigns being canceled as Reigns tested positive for COVID-19. On the following episode of Raw, Lesnar reunited with Paul Heyman, who announced that Lesnar's first challenger for the title would be determined by a fatal four-way match between Big E, Lashley, Owens, and Rollins. Lashley won the bout to face Lesnar for the WWE Championship at the Royal Rumble.

On the January 7 episode of SmackDown, as Roman Reigns did not have a challenger for his Universal Championship at the Royal Rumble, WWE official Adam Pearce informed Reigns that he had selected his opponent. Reigns dismissed Pearce, stating he had already defeated everyone on the SmackDown roster. Later that night, Raw's Seth "Freakin" Rollins confronted Reigns in his locker room, laughing hysterically at Reigns, seemingly confirming he was Pearce's selection. On the January 10 episode of Raw, Rollins confirmed that he would be challenging Reigns for the Universal Championship at the Royal Rumble in an interbrand matchup. On the January 21 episode of SmackDown, Rollins and Kevin Owens defeated The Usos (Jey Uso and Jimmy Uso) by disqualification thanks to interference from Reigns, thus barring The Usos from ringside during the Universal Championship match as per the stipulation; had Rollins and Owens lost, Rollins would have forfeited his championship opportunity.

At Day 1, Beth Phoenix appeared to aid her husband and fellow WWE Hall of Famer, Edge, when he was being attacked by Maryse while he was engaged in a match with The Miz; Edge ultimately won the match. On the following Raw, Miz and Maryse berated Edge and Phoenix, with the latter challenging Miz and Maryse to a mixed tag team match at the Royal Rumble. Miz accepted, despite Maryse's displeasure.

At Day 1, Becky Lynch defeated Liv Morgan to retain the Raw Women's Championship. On the following Raw, Morgan confronted Lynch, wanting another rematch. Bianca Belair interrupted, also wanting a championship match due to her unsettled rivalry with Lynch that began at SummerSlam in August 2021. A brawl then ensued. Later backstage, Doudrop confronted WWE officials Adam Pearce and Sonya Deville, demanding a title match herself as she was tired of Belair and Morgan always receiving opportunities. Pearce and Deville scheduled a triple threat match between Belair, Morgan, and Doudrop for the following week with the winner facing Lynch for the Raw Women's Championship at the Royal Rumble. The match was won by Doudrop, thanks to Lynch attacking Belair.

== Event ==
Other on-screen personnel
Role:	Name:
English commentators	Michael Cole (SmackDown/Men's Royal Rumble match)
English commentators	Pat McAfee (SmackDown/Men's Royal Rumble match)
English commentators	Jimmy Smith (Raw/Women's Royal Rumble match)
English commentators	Corey Graves (Raw/Women's Royal Rumble match)
English commentators	Byron Saxton (Raw/Women's Royal Rumble match)
Spanish commentators	Carlos Cabrera
Spanish commentators	Marcelo Rodriguez
Ring announcers	Mike Rome (Raw/Women's Royal Rumble match)
Ring announcers	Samantha Irvin (SmackDown/Men's Royal Rumble match)
Referees	Danilo Anfibio
Referees	Shawn Bennett
Referees	Jessika Carr
Referees	Dan Engler
Referees	Daphanie LaShaunn
Referees	Eddie Orengo
Referees	Chad Patton
Referees	Charles Robinson
Referees	Ryan Tran
Referees	Rod Zapata
Pre-show panel	Kayla Braxton
Pre-show panel	Kevin Patrick
Pre-show panel	Peter Rosenberg
Pre-show panel	Booker T
Pre-show panel	Jerry Lawler

=== Preliminary matches ===
The PLE opened with Roman Reigns defending the Universal Championship against Seth "Freakin" Rollins, with The Usos (Jey Uso and Jimmy Uso) barred from ringside. Reigns entered first, followed by Rollins, who came out to The Shield's former entrance theme and gear and walking in through the crowd to taunt Reigns. Rollins drove Reigns through the announce table with a Powerbomb. Rollins followed up with a Frog Splash on Reigns for a nearfall. Rollins attempted a Phoenix Splash, but Reigns moved out of the way. Rollins intercepted a Spear attempt and followed up with a Buckle Bomb and The Stomp on Reigns for a nearfall. Rollins attempted a second Stomp, but Reigns turned him inside out with a clothesline. Reigns performed a Powerbomb on Rollins for a nearfall. Rollins applied a triangle choke, only for Reigns to counter into another Powerbomb. Outside the ring, Reigns sent Rollins into the timekeeper's area and into the steel ring steps. Reigns followed up with a Superman Punch on Rollins for a nearfall. Reigns then performed a Spear on Rollins outside the ring and looked to do so again back inside, but Rollins countered the move into a Pedigree on Reigns for a nearfall. In the closing moments, Reigns performed a second Spear on Rollins, who offered a fist bump to Reigns. Reigns then applied the guillotine choke on Rollins, who grabbed the rope to void the submission; however, Reigns refused to release Rollins and was disqualified. Rollins won the match but Reigns retained the title, as they do not change hands by disqualification unless stipulated. Following the match, Reigns viciously assaulted Rollins with a steel chair (as deliberate revenge for Rollins betraying Reigns in the same way that caused the Shield's breakup 8 years prior).

The second match was the women's Royal Rumble match for a women's championship match at WrestleMania 38. Sasha Banks started the match along with Melina, in her first WWE match since 2011. Banks eliminated Melina early, after which, Tamina entered at #3 followed by Kelly Kelly. Kelly was eliminated by Banks, as well. Aliyah entered at #5, followed by Liv Morgan. One half of the WWE Women's Tag Team Champions, Queen Zelina (#7), kicked Banks through the ropes to eliminate her. Afterwards, Bianca Belair (#8) performed a vertical suplex on Zelina before 24/7 Champion Dana Brooke entered 9th. Michelle McCool entered 10th and sent Brooke off the ring apron. Reggie was able to save Brooke from elimination, only for McCool to knock Brooke off the top rope to eliminate her. Instead of entering in the match, Sonya Deville (#11) sat at commentary. Natalya (#12) sent both Belair and Tamina over the top rope, with the latter's feet touching the floor. Cameron, in her first WWE appearance since 2016, entered at #13. Deville then officially entered the match and eliminated Cameron, due to her ties with Naomi, who Deville had been feuding with on SmackDown. Naomi entered at #14 and eliminated Deville. The other half of the WWE Women's Tag Team Champions, Carmella (#15), took a stroll around the ring before Rhea Ripley (#16) eliminated both Carmella and Zelina. SmackDown Women's Champion Charlotte Flair (#17) dominated the field, including eliminating Aliyah, and kicked Naomi off the apron, but Naomi was able to use her hands to prevent elimination. However, Deville pulled Naomi off the apron for an elimination. Ivory entered at #18 in her Right to Censor gimmick and was quickly eliminated by Ripley. Brie Bella (#19) entered next followed by Impact Knockouts World Champion Mickie James, who eliminated McCool. Alicia Fox was a surprise entrant at #21. Nikki A.S.H. (#22) attacked her former tag team partner, Ripley, from behind and attempted to eliminate her, but Ripley prevented it. Summer Rae (#23), who appeared on SmackDown prior to the event, returned to the ring for the first time in over 6 years and reignited her rivalry with Natalya, who eliminated her. Nikki Bella (#24) teamed with Brie to eliminate Fox. Sarah Logan was another surprise entrant at #25, but was quickly eliminated by The Bella Twins (Nikki and Brie), who eliminated Morgan shortly afterwards. Lita (#26) performed a DDT on James through the ropes to eliminate her. Mighty Molly (#27) was blindsided by A.S.H., who eliminated Molly. Afterwards, Ronda Rousey made a surprise return at #28, her first appearance since WrestleMania 35 in April 2019. Rousey eliminated A.S.H., followed by Brie eliminating Nikki. Shotzi entered at #29 and dove onto the other opponents before Rousey eliminated Brie. Shayna Baszler entered last. Rousey eliminated Shotzi followed by Natalya, who reentered the ring, only to be sent over the top rope by Rousey again. Lita attempted a Moonsault, but Ripley cut her off, followed by Flair eliminating Lita. Flair then performed a Big Boot on Ripley to eliminate her. The final four were Flair, Rousey, Belair, and Baszler. Belair and Baszler were both eliminated by Flair. As Flair tried to eliminate Rousey, Rousey caught Flair and eliminated her to win the match and earn a women's championship opportunity at WrestleMania 38.

After that, Becky Lynch defended the Raw Women's Championship against Doudrop. In the end, Lynch performed the Manhandle Slam from the top rope on Doudrop to retain the title.

In the fourth match, Brock Lesnar (accompanied by Paul Heyman) defended the WWE Championship against Bobby Lashley (accompanied by MVP). At the start of the match, Lesnar and Lashley performed German suplexes on each other. Lashley delivered two Spears on Lesnar, who rolled outside the ring. As Lashley attempted to perform a spear on Lesnar through the barricade as he did at Day 1, Lesnar moved out of the way and Lashley crashed through the barricade. Back in the ring, Lesnar performed multiple German suplexes on Lashley. As Lashley applied in the Hurt Lock, Lesnar tried to free himself by pushing Lashley into a turnbuckle, inadvertently incapacitating the referee. Lesnar performed an F-5 on Lashley, who accidentally incapacitated the referee again. In the climax, Roman Reigns entered the ring and performed a spear on Lesnar. Reigns signaled for Heyman to hand him the WWE Championship belt which he did, double crossing Lesnar. Reigns then struck Lesnar over the head with the belt after which, Heyman walked off with Reigns, thus realigning with Reigns once again as his special counsel. Lashley pinned Lesnar to win the title for a second time.

In the penultimate match, Edge and Beth Phoenix took on The Miz and Maryse in a mixed tag team match. During the match, while the referee was focused on The Miz, Maryse struck Phoenix from behind with her purse for a nearfall and also managed to perform a Hurricanrana on Edge from the top rope. The Miz performed the Skull Crushing Finale on Edge for a nearfall. In the end, Edge and Phoenix performed a double Spear on The Miz and performed a pair of Glam Slams on The Miz and Maryse to win the match.

=== Main event ===
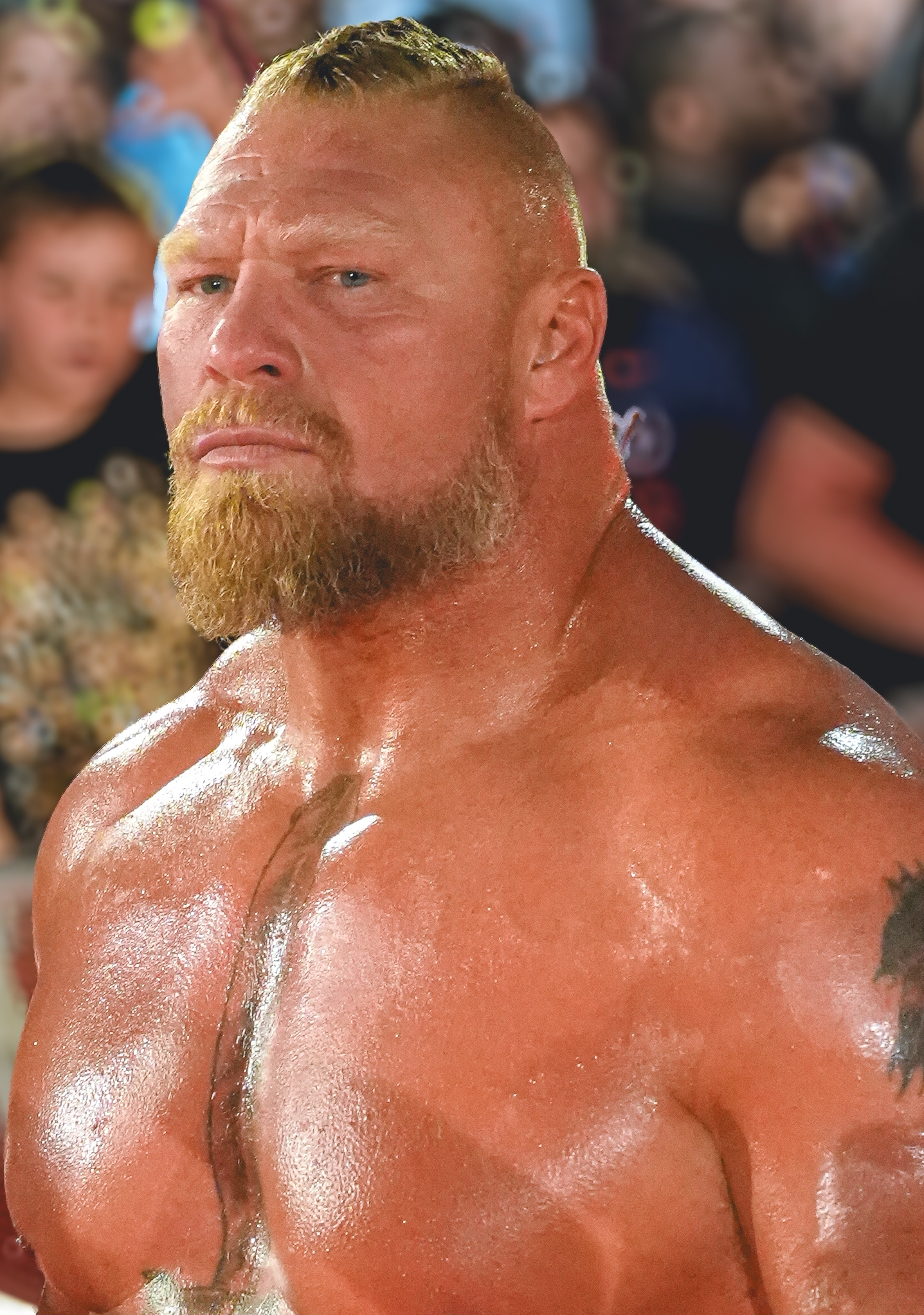
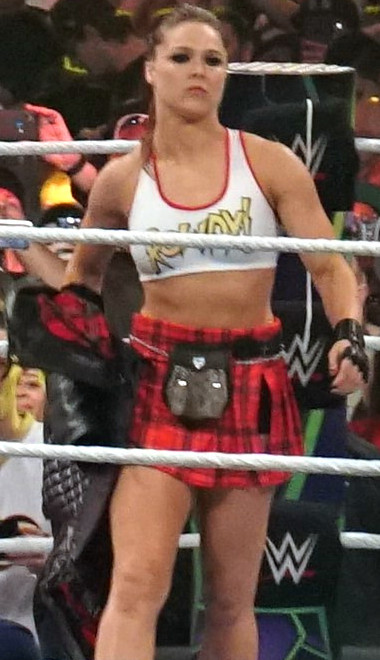
Brock Lesnar and Ronda Rousey were the respective winners of the men's and women's Royal Rumble matches.

The main event was the men's Royal Rumble match for a men's world championship match at WrestleMania 38. AJ Styles and Intercontinental Champion Shinsuke Nakamura started the match. Austin Theory entered at #3, followed by Robert Roode, who was eliminated by Styles. Ridge Holland entered his first Royal Rumble match at #5, after which, Styles eliminated Nakamura. Montez Ford (#6) attempted to eliminate Theory, who prevented elimination. Afterwards, United States Champion Damian Priest entered at #7. Johnny Knoxville entered at #9 and went after Sami Zayn (#8). After Knoxville took a couple of finishers from other wrestlers, he was eliminated by Zayn, who was then eliminated by Styles. After Angelo Dawkins entered at #10, Omos entered at #11 and eliminated The Street Profits (Dawkins and Ford) and Priest before being eliminated by Styles, Theory, Raw Tag Team Champion Chad Gable (#13), Dominik Mysterio (#14), Ricochet (#12), and Holland. Happy Corbin (#15) managed to eliminate Ricochet before Dolph Ziggler entered at #16. Afterwards, Corbin performed a Deep Six on Dominik before eliminating him. Styles then eliminated Theory. After Styles eliminated Holland, Sheamus (#17) went right after Styles before Rick Boogs (#18) eliminated Gable. Corbin then teamed with Madcap Moss (#19) to eliminate Styles. After Riddle entered at #20, Corbin and Moss eliminated Boogs before Drew McIntyre made a surprise return from injury at #21 and eliminated Corbin and Moss as revenge for them injuring him a few weeks earlier. Kevin Owens (#22) had a showdown with McIntyre, with Owens getting the better of it before Rey Mysterio entered at #23. Rey almost eliminated Riddle, but was laid out with a Stunner by Owens. Kofi Kingston (#24) went for a springboard move, but was shoved off the top rope by Owens. Kingston attempted to land on the outside barricade, but both feet accidentally hit the floor, resulting in his elimination. The other half of the Raw Tag Team Champions, Otis (#25), dominated Ziggler, McIntyre, and Riddle before Big E entered at #26. In his first appearance since WrestleMania 37 the previous year, reggaeton singer Bad Bunny entered at #27 as a surprise entrant. Bad Bunny performed a Destroyer on Riddle before being sent over the top rope by Sheamus. Bad Bunny avoided a Brogue Kick attempt, causing Sheamus to be eliminated. After Rey performed a 619 on Ziggler, Bad Bunny eliminated Ziggler. Shane McMahon, also in his first appearance since WrestleMania 37, entered at #28 as a surprise entrant. At the same time, Otis eliminated Rey. Shane eliminated Owens before Randy Orton entered at #29. RK-Bro (Orton and Riddle) teamed up to eliminate Big E and Otis. Brock Lesnar then entered as the surprise #30 entrant and dominated everyone before eliminating Orton. Lesnar then performed an F-5 on Bad Bunny before eliminating him, bringing the final four to Lesnar, McIntyre, McMahon, and Riddle. Lesnar eliminated Riddle and McMahon before having a staredown with McIntyre, the same man who eliminated Lesnar in and won the men's Royal Rumble match two years earlier. The two traded blows, with Lesnar driving McIntyre in the corner. Lesnar attempted an F-5, but McIntyre countered and performed a Glasgow Kiss. McIntyre attempted a Claymore Kick, but Lesnar blocked and followed up with an F-5 over the top rope on McIntyre to win the match and earn a world championship match at WrestleMania 38, becoming the fourth person to win from the No. 30 spot (after The Undertaker in 2007, John Cena in 2008, and Triple H in 2016). This made Lesnar the ninth two-time Royal Rumble winner, his first win being in 2003. This also made him the first person to lose their world championship and then win the eponymous match in the same night. Among the other multi-time Royal Rumble winners, Lesnar also set a record for the longest time between Royal Rumble wins at 19 years. He also set the record for the least amount of time spent in the Royal Rumble before winning it. He was in the match for 2 minutes and 30 seconds, beating Edge's 2010 record by 5 minutes and 7 seconds.

== Reception ==
The men's Royal Rumble match was widely panned by critics and fans due to what they felt was a lack of surprises and star-power, with some listing it among the worst Royal Rumble matches in WWE history. Writing for Sports Illustrated, Bryan Alvarez described the match as "boring", calling it a "pretty by-the-numbers generic Rumble" as "the most notable thing about the match was how quickly they were rushing everything to get the show off the air by midnight ET even though the history of the Royal Rumble has shown that fudging the intervals is not something WWE has ever avoided, and doing it here would have left more time for the big moments at the end."

Wesley Roesch of Wrestling Inc. ranked this Royal Rumble as the worst WWE pay-per-view of 2022. He said that the best match was the Reigns-Rollins match, stating that Rollins using The Shield's entrance music and gear was "genius and hyped the crowd," but said that the ending was "disappointing" and that there was "ultimately no payoff with the feud." He also stated that the mixed tag team match and the Raw Women's Championship match were "solid filler matches but nothing special," and that Ronda Rousey was "a predictable winner" for the women's Royal Rumble match. Roesch stated that Paul Heyman joining Roman Reigns was "a nice twist," but Brock Lesnar's loss to Bobby Lashley led to the men's Royal Rumble match being "the most disappointing match of the night," stating that once Lesnar lost to Lashley, "everyone knew that Lesnar would enter and win the Royal Rumble," which he described as having "a lack of surprises and dull or botched spots," making that match "one of the worst in years."

Brent Brookhouse of CBS Sports gave praise to the Universal Championship match, giving it a grade of A−, stating that the match was "outstanding," but the finish was "polarizing but it does a lot of things well," and Rollins "stays as a fresh and compelling challenger moving forward since he didn't eat a clean loss." He gave the women's Royal Rumble match a grade of C, stating that the match was "a bit clunky with too many women who aren't used to working together all getting stuck in the match and slowing things down," and that it was "the worst women's Royal Rumble since the start of holding the matches." Brookhouse also gave praise to the WWE Championship match, stating that it was "very good and very physical stuff from Lesnar and Lashley, who did not disappoint," but panned the men's Royal Rumble match, giving it a grade of F, stating that the match was an "unmitigated disaster," and that it "easily ranks among the five worst of all time, if not lower." He said that "the match dragged badly and the crowd was lost because of it -- and further lost when Kingston's big spot went wrong." Finally, he stated that "McMahon and Bad Bunny in the final five is just the wrong call beyond any doubt."

Chris Mueller of Bleacher Report gave the Universal Championship match a grade of A, stating that "Rollins using his Shield gear and entrance music was a brilliant way to bring him into this match and get the crowd in the right mindset for the night," and that the disqualification ending "actually worked for the story being told, especially if this feud is going to continue past the Rumble." He said that the women's Royal Rumble match had "some fun spots and featured standout moments for several competitors," but it was "disappointing we didn't get to see Bayley or anyone from NXT like Io Shirai or Dakota Kai." Mueller praised the WWE Championship match, giving it a grade of B+, stating that the match was "exactly what it needed to be," that being "two big dudes throwing each other around and beating each other up." He stated that the finish was "convoluted and is one issue some will call out, but this gave Lashley back the WWE title and set up Lesnar vs. Reigns down the line," and that it "was a fun way to accomplish two things at once." Mueller criticized the men's Royal Rumble match, giving it a grade of C−, stating that it "never quite hit its stride," and that "the crowd was clearly tired and WWE has changed quite a lot of entrance themes lately, so there weren't too many big pops to be heard." He also stated that Kofi Kingston's failed save "deflated things even further," and that after Lesnar lost the WWE Championship, "speculation about him winning the men's Rumble began to run rampant on social media." Mueller said that another person could have won the match and Lesnar still could have faced Reigns at WrestleMania 38, but WWE management "clearly thought this was the right call." He concluded that the event "fell a bit short for such an important show."

The highest rated match on the card, according to Dave Meltzer, was the Universal Championship match, which received 3.5 stars. The WWE Championship match received 3.25 stars, the mixed tag team match received 2.75 stars, and the Raw Women's Championship match and the Royal Rumble matches all received 2.25 stars.

== Aftermath ==
On the following episode of Raw, Ronda Rousey pondered which title to challenge for as she had heated history with both reigning champions. After Raw Women's Champion Becky Lynch confronted Rousey and demanded she make her choice that night, Rousey responded that she would reveal her choice on SmackDown. There, Rousey announced that she would challenge Charlotte Flair for the SmackDown Women's Championship at WrestleMania 38.

This ended up being the last WWE event for Spanish commentator Carlos Cabrera, who was released on February 17. Shane McMahon was also released on February 2, but made his return at Night 2 of WrestleMania 39.

=== Raw ===
Also on the following episode of Raw, Brock Lesnar revealed that he would be challenging Roman Reigns for the Universal Championship at WrestleMania 38. However, he also challenged Bobby Lashley to a rematch for the WWE Championship that night due to the controversial finish of their Royal Rumble match. Lashley declined; however, WWE official Adam Pearce added Lesnar to the WWE Championship Elimination Chamber match at Elimination Chamber. Seth "Freakin" Rollins was also added to the Chamber match due to technically defeating Reigns at the Royal Rumble. Lesnar won the Elimination Chamber match to regain the WWE Championship, thus converting his Universal Championship match against Reigns at WrestleMania into a Winner Takes All match, which was later stipulated as a Championship Unification match.

As Ronda Rousey was leaving the ring, Lita appeared and challenged Becky Lynch for the Raw Women's Championship at Elimination Chamber, which was made official.

=== SmackDown ===
On the following episode of SmackDown, Drew McIntyre stated he would continue to target Happy Corbin and Madcap Moss due to them almost ending his career at Day 1, and a match between Moss and McIntyre was scheduled for Elimination Chamber, which was later changed to a Falls Count Anywhere match.

Also on SmackDown, Universal Champion Roman Reigns, Paul Heyman, and SmackDown Tag Team Champions The Usos (Jey Uso and Jimmy Uso) opened the show. Heyman talked about his realignment with Reigns at the Royal Rumble, stating that Reigns accepting the hand of The Bloodline caused Brock Lesnar to lose his WWE Championship. Heyman then stated that the champion vs. champion match had been called off and acknowledged Reigns, only for Goldberg to interrupt. Goldberg then acknowledged Reigns, but only as his next victim. A match between the two for the Universal Championship was made official for Elimination Chamber. It was originally scheduled to take place at WrestleMania 36, with Goldberg as champion, but Reigns pulled out of the event due to concerns over COVID-19, and was replaced by Braun Strowman, who defeated Goldberg to win the title.

Sonya Deville stated that instead of Naomi facing her, Naomi would receive a SmackDown Women's Championship match against Charlotte Flair the following week, where Flair retained. Afterwards, Flair and Deville attacked Naomi until Ronda Rousey made the save. This led to a match pitting Rousey and Naomi against Deville and Flair at Elimination Chamber, which Rousey and Naomi won.

The following episode of SmackDown showed footage of Sami Zayn inviting himself to the red carpet premiere of Jackass Forever, for which he was kicked out by Johnny Knoxville. Zayn was then informed that he would receive an Intercontinental Championship match two weeks later, where Zayn was successful in winning the title. On the February 25 episode, Knoxville invited himself to Zayn's celebration for winning the title. Knoxville challenged Zayn for the title at WrestleMania 38, which Zayn declined. The following week, during Zayn's title defense, Knoxville distracted Zayn, costing him the title. Zayn then challenged Knoxville to a match at WrestleMania 38, and Knoxville accepted. After Knoxville shared Zayn's phone number, causing a multitude of people attempting to contact Zayn, Zayn changed the stipulation to an Anything Goes match, and Knoxville accepted.

== Results ==
No.	Results	Stipulations	Times
1	Seth "Freakin" Rollins defeated Roman Reigns (c) by disqualification	Singles match for the WWE Universal Championship; The Usos (Jey Uso and Jimmy Uso) were banned from ringside.	14:25
2	Ronda Rousey won by last eliminating Charlotte Flair	30-woman Royal Rumble match for a world championship match at WrestleMania 38	59:40
3	Becky Lynch (c) defeated Doudrop by pinfall	Singles match for the WWE Raw Women's Championship	13:00
4	Bobby Lashley (with MVP) defeated Brock Lesnar (c) (with Paul Heyman) by pinfall	Singles match for the WWE Championship	10:15
5	Edge and Beth Phoenix defeated The Miz and Maryse by pinfall	Mixed tag team match	12:30
6	Brock Lesnar won by last eliminating Drew McIntyre	30-man Royal Rumble match for a world championship match at WrestleMania 38	51:10
(c) / – the champion(s) heading into the match

=== Women's Royal Rumble match entrances and eliminations ===
– Raw
– SmackDown
– Hall of Famer (HOF)
– Impact Wrestling (Impact)
– Unaffiliated
– Winner

Draw	Entrant	Brand/Status	Order	Eliminated by	Time	Elimination(s)
1	Sasha Banks	SmackDown	3	Queen Zelina	09:44	2
2	Melina	Unaffiliated	1	Sasha Banks	00:53	0
3	Tamina	Raw	5	Natalya	16:41	0
4	Kelly Kelly	Unaffiliated	2	Sasha Banks	01:05	0
5	Aliyah	SmackDown	10	Charlotte Flair	22:50	0
6	Liv Morgan	Raw	17	Brie Bella	37:20	0
7	Queen Zelina	Raw	9	Rhea Ripley	17:25	1
8	Bianca Belair	Raw	28	Charlotte Flair	47:30	1
9	Dana Brooke	Raw	4	Michelle McCool	02:12	0
10	Michelle McCool	Unaffiliated	13	Mickie James	20:50	1
11	Sonya Deville	Unbranded	7	Naomi	02:00	2
12	Natalya	SmackDown	24	Bianca Belair	36:17	2
13	Cameron	Unaffiliated	6	Sonya Deville	00:51	0
14	Naomi	SmackDown	11	Sonya Deville (Note: Deville was already eliminated when she came back to ringside to eliminate Naomi.)	07:18	1
15	Carmella	Raw	8	Rhea Ripley	00:50	0
16	Rhea Ripley	Raw	26	Charlotte Flair	30:59	3
17	Charlotte Flair	SmackDown	29	Ronda Rousey	31:23	5
18	Ivory	HOF	12	Rhea Ripley	00:25	0
19	Brie Bella	HOF	22	Ronda Rousey	19:21	3
20	Mickie James	Impact	18	Lita	11:40	1
21	Alicia Fox	Unaffiliated	15	Nikki Bella	06:30	0
22	Nikki A.S.H.	Raw	20	Ronda Rousey	12:13	1
23	Summer Rae	Unaffiliated	14	Natalya	00:52	0
24	Nikki Bella	HOF	21	Brie Bella	08:40	2
25	Sarah Logan	Unaffiliated	16	Brie Bella and Nikki Bella	00:43	0
26	Lita	HOF	25	Charlotte Flair	10:21	1
27	Mighty Molly	HOF	19	Nikki A.S.H.	00:20	0
28	Ronda Rousey	Unaffiliated	—	Winner	10:16	4
29	Shotzi	SmackDown	23	Ronda Rousey	02:56	0
30	Shayna Baszler	SmackDown	27	Charlotte Flair	05:31	0

=== Men's Royal Rumble match entrances and eliminations ===
– Raw
– SmackDown
– Celebrity entrant
– Unaffiliated
– Winner

Draw	Entrant	Brand/Status	Order	Eliminated by	Time	Elimination(s)
1	AJ Styles	Raw	14	Madcap Moss	29:06	6
2	Shinsuke Nakamura	SmackDown	2	AJ Styles	05:51	0
3	Austin Theory	Raw	11	AJ Styles	22:06	1
4	Robert Roode	Raw	1	AJ Styles	00:54	0
5	Ridge Holland	SmackDown	12	AJ Styles	19:11	1
6	Montez Ford	Raw	6	Omos	09:10	0
7	Damian Priest	Raw	7	Omos	11:04	0
8	Sami Zayn	SmackDown	4	AJ Styles	03:17	1
9	Johnny Knoxville	Celebrity	3	Sami Zayn	01:26	0
10	Angelo Dawkins	Raw	5	Omos	02:15	0
11	Omos	Raw	8	AJ Styles, Austin Theory, Chad Gable, Dominik Mysterio, Ricochet, and Ridge Holland	04:24	3
12	Ricochet	SmackDown	9	Happy Corbin	04:23	1
13	Chad Gable	Raw	13	Rick Boogs	08:18	1
14	Dominik Mysterio	Raw	10	Happy Corbin	03:44	1
15	Happy Corbin	SmackDown	17	Drew McIntyre	10:47	3
16	Dolph Ziggler	Raw	20	Bad Bunny	20:46	0
17	Sheamus	SmackDown	19	Bad Bunny	17:55	0
18	Rick Boogs	SmackDown	15	Happy Corbin	04:33	1
19	Madcap Moss	SmackDown	16	Drew McIntyre	04:24	1
20	Riddle	Raw	27	Brock Lesnar	19:46	2
21	Drew McIntyre	SmackDown	29	Brock Lesnar	19:18	2
22	Kevin Owens	Raw	22	Shane McMahon	11:13	1
23	Rey Mysterio	Raw	21	Otis	09:05	0
24	Kofi Kingston	SmackDown	18	Kevin Owens	00:21	0
25	Otis	Raw	24	Riddle and Randy Orton	08:52	1
26	Big E	SmackDown	23	Riddle and Randy Orton	06:37	0
27	Bad Bunny	Celebrity	26	Brock Lesnar	07:41	2
28	Shane McMahon	Unaffiliated	28	Brock Lesnar	05:38	1
29	Randy Orton	Raw	25	Brock Lesnar	02:21	2
30	Brock Lesnar	Unaffiliated	—	Winner	02:32	5
