= WWE Raw premiere on Netflix =

Professional wrestling television special

- Promotional poster featuring Roman Reigns, Bianca Belair, and Cody Rhodes
- Promotion: WWE
- Brand(s): Raw; SmackDown
- Date: January 6, 2025
- City: Inglewood, California
- Venue: Intuit Dome
- Attendance: 17,514

Raw special episodes chronology
← Previous; Day 1	Next → Raw on Netflix Anniversary Show

The Monday Night Raw premiere on Netflix was a professional wrestling television special produced by WWE. It marked the debut of WWE's weekly Monday Night Raw program on the streaming service Netflix. The event took place on January 6, 2025, from the Intuit Dome in Inglewood, California, and featured performers from the Raw and SmackDown brands. This episode of Raw marked a shift from broadcasting on traditional linear television to over-the-top digital streaming.

The episode also featured appearances by The Rock, The Undertaker, Hulk Hogan (in what would turn out to be Hogan's final in-person appearance at a wrestling event before his death in July 2025), John Cena (which marked the start of Cena's farewell tour ahead of his retirement from in-ring competition at the end of 2025), and rapper Travis Scott (Scott was also meant to have a performance during this episode, however, it was abruptly cancelled on the spot after he was spotted smoking cannabis during his entrance alongside Jey Uso).

Four matches were contested at the event. In the main event, CM Punk defeated Seth "Freakin" Rollins. In other matches contested, Roman Reigns defeated Solo Sikoa in a Tribal Combat match for the Ula Fala and recognition as Tribal Chief of the Anoaʻi family, Jey Uso defeated Drew McIntyre, and Rhea Ripley defeated Liv Morgan to win the Women's World Championship for a second time.

== Production ==
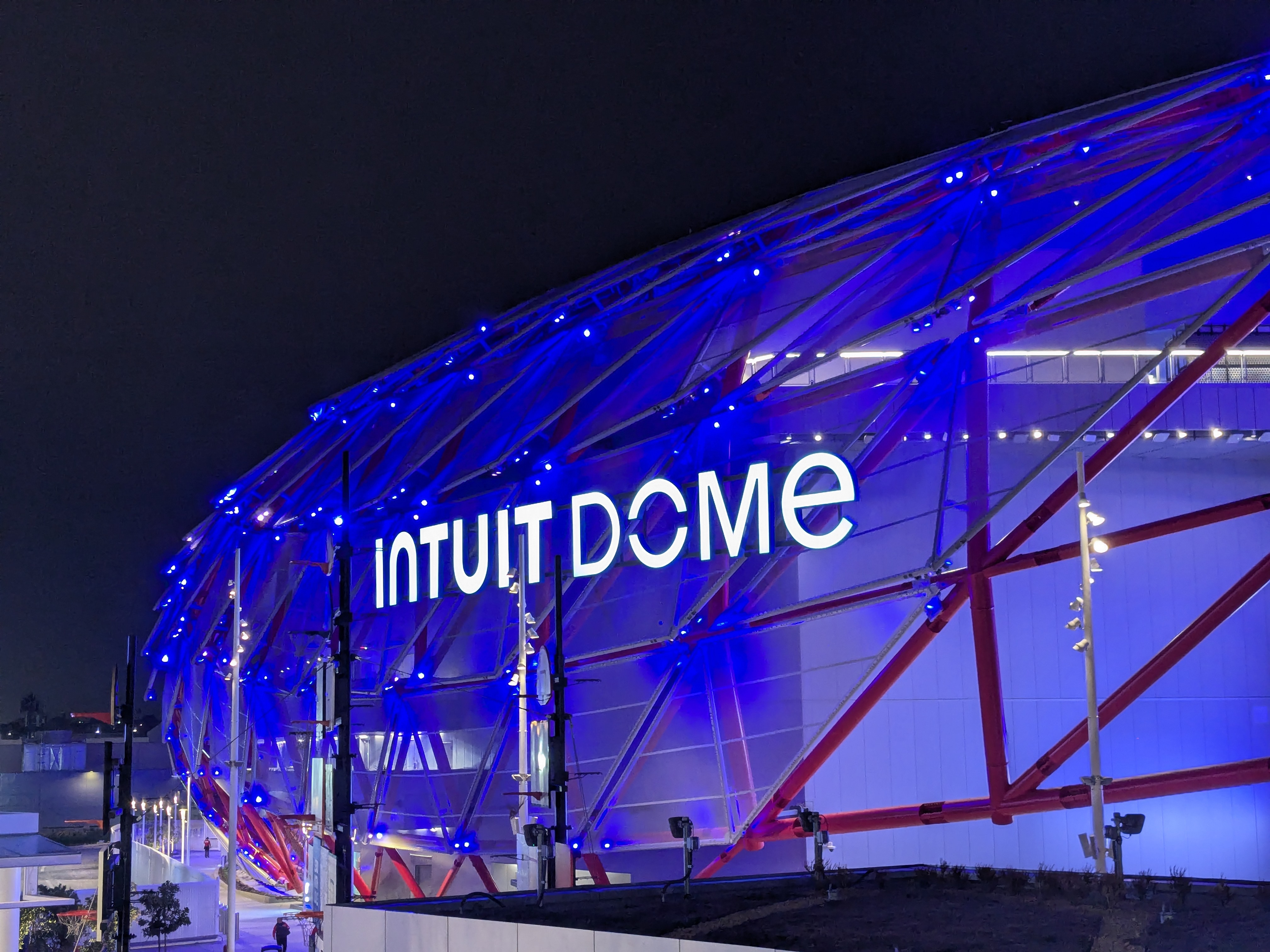
The event took place at Intuit Dome in Inglewood, California.

=== Background ===
WWE Raw is a professional wrestling television program produced by the American promotion WWE. It first aired on January 11, 1993, on the USA Network and since became the longest-running weekly episodic program in television history with no reruns, airing almost exclusively on USA, apart from a brief run on TNN (renamed to Spike TV in 2003 and now known as the Paramount Network) from 2000 to 2005. It is one of WWE's two flagship television programs, alongside Friday Night SmackDown, and is also the namesake program for the company's Raw brand, a subdivision of WWE's main roster where wrestlers are exclusively assigned to perform on a weekly basis, albeit with some exceptions.

On January 23, 2024, WWE's parent company TKO Group Holdings announced that Netflix would acquire the rights to Monday Night Raw beginning in January 2025, in what was reported to be a 10-year deal worth $500 million per-year (roughly double the value of WWE's agreement with NBCUniversal). The agreement initially covered the United States, Canada, the United Kingdom, and Latin America, with other territories to be added in the future. The agreement also includes international rights to WWE content outside of the United States, including SmackDown and NXT, live events, and other shoulder content. While USA Network's contract for Raw was to expire in October 2024, WWE reached a short-term extension of its agreement with NBCUniversal to keep Raw on the network through the end of the year. In preparation for the move to Netflix, Raw was shortened from three to two hours from October 7 through December 30; wrestling reporter Dave Meltzer stated that this was a request made by USA Network.

It was then reported that Intuit Dome, which opened in August 2024 to host the Los Angeles Clippers in Inglewood, California, was set to host the debut episode of Raw on Netflix. WWE confirmed the location on November 18, 2024; tickets went on sale to the general public on November 22. That same day, it was announced that Travis Scott would be making an appearance at the Netflix premiere to perform the program's new theme song.

The Raw logo that was unveiled on December 16, 2024, by WWE Chief Content Officer Paul "Triple H" Levesque.

During a June 2024 episode of The Pat McAfee Show, WWE chief content officer Paul "Triple H" Levesque noted that Netflix would offer greater flexibility than WWE's previous partners in regards to standards and practices that had sometimes resulted in portions of WWE programming being censored on U.S. television. Although a placeholder listing for Raw with a TV-14 rating appeared on Netflix in the months leading up to the move, WWE president Nick Khan subsequently clarified that Raw would remain a "family friendly [...] advertiser friendly" program, and that episodes on Netflix would have the same TV-PG content rating used since 2008. On December 16, 2024, Levesque officially unveiled the new Raw logo. On the January 4, 2025, edition of the SI Media with Jimmy Traina podcast, Levesque said that the length of the show on Netflix would be flexible and would not have a fixed runtime, though aiming for an average runtime of 2.5 hours.

=== Storylines ===
The event included matches that resulted from scripted storylines. Results were predetermined by WWE's writers on the Raw and SmackDown brands, while storylines were produced on WWE's weekly television shows, Monday Night Raw and Friday Night SmackDown.

On July 6, 2024, at Money in the Bank, 16-time WWE world champion John Cena officially announced that he would retire from professional wrestling at the end of 2025, having wrestled for WWE since 2002 (though part-time since 2018). It was then announced that Cena would be appearing on the debut episode of Raw on Netflix. On January 5, 2025, The Rock confirmed that he would be appearing on the debut episode of Raw on Netflix.

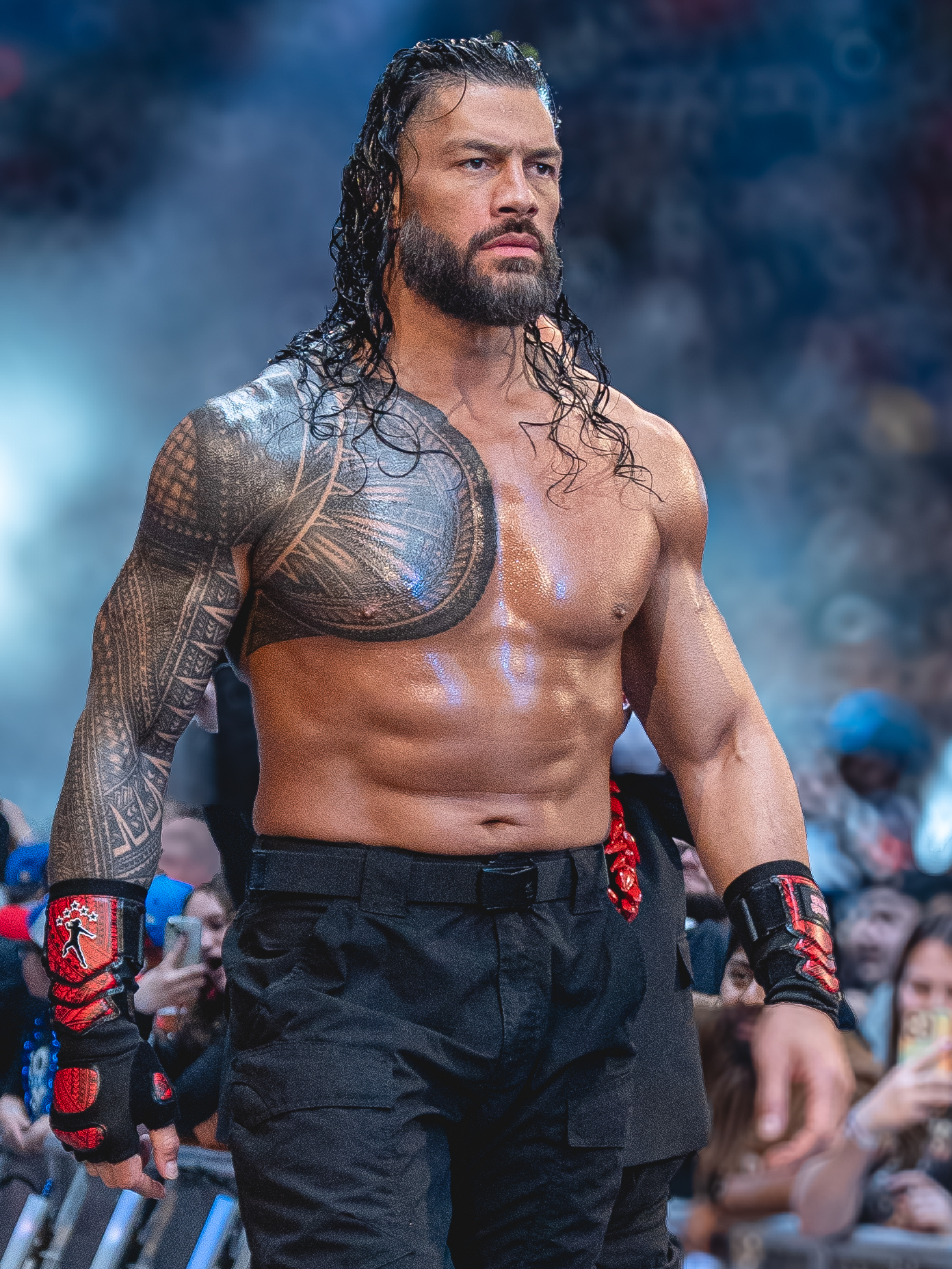
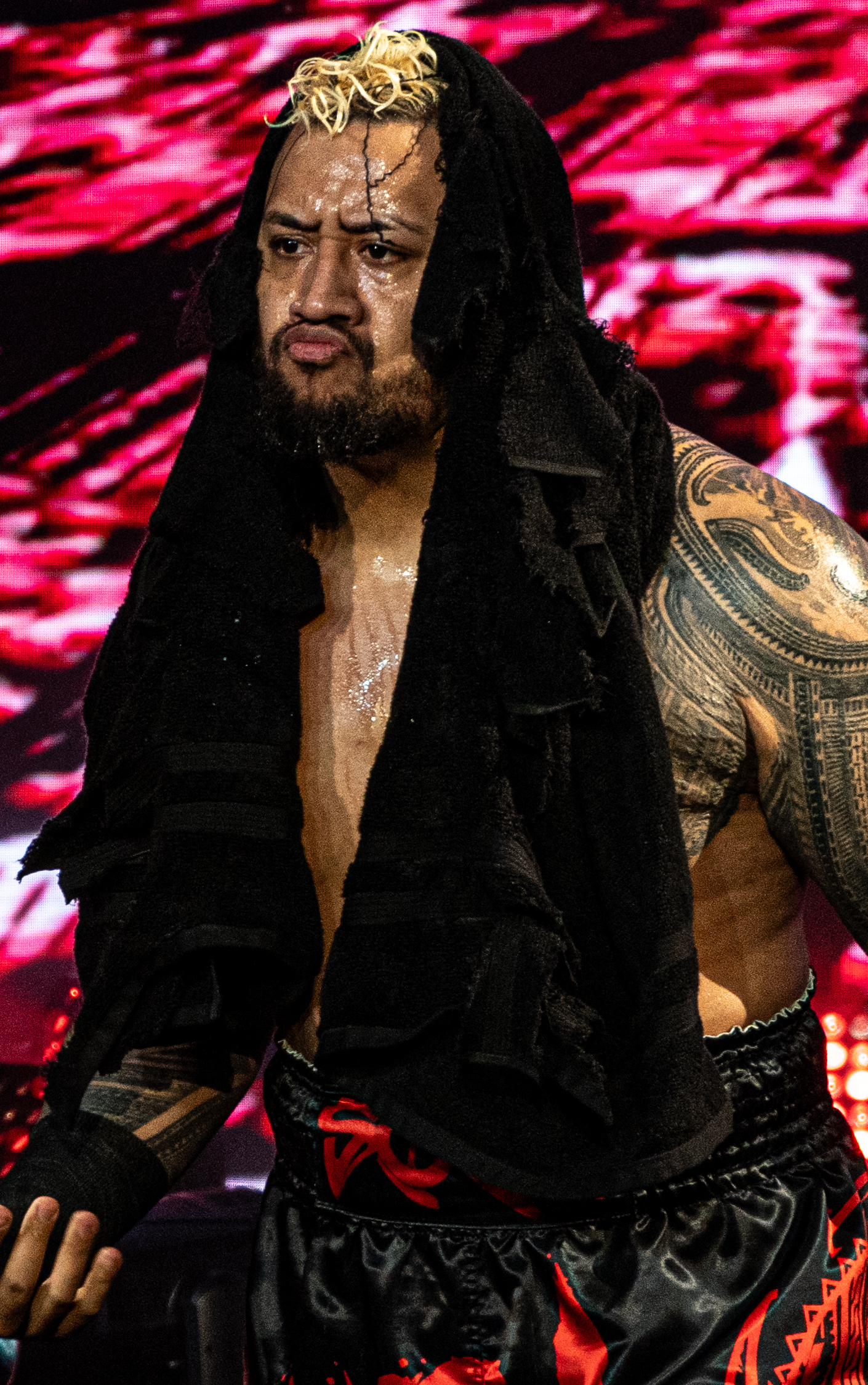
In the opening bout, Roman Reigns faced Solo Sikoa in a Tribal Combat match for the Ula Fala and title of "Tribal Chief" of the Anoa'i family.

On Night 2 of WrestleMania XL in April, Cody Rhodes defeated Roman Reigns to win the Undisputed WWE Championship in a Bloodline Rules match, ending Reigns' historic title reign at 1,316 days. After the event, Reigns took an extended hiatus while Solo Sikoa appointed himself as the new leader of The Bloodline, removing Jimmy Uso and manager Paul Heyman from the group while adding Tama Tonga, Tonga Loa, and Jacob Fatu. Sikoa would also begin referring to himself as the new Tribal Chief of the group, stealing Reigns' Ula Fala, a neckpiece symbolizing leadership of a Samoan tribe. Reigns would eventually return at SummerSlam to cost Sikoa his title match against Rhodes, turning face for the first time since 2020. Rhodes and Reigns would then team up to defeat Fatu and Sikoa at Bad Blood with the help of a returning Jimmy. Reigns and Jimmy would subsequently be joined by Jimmy's twin brother and former Bloodline member Jey Uso, who had left the group on his own terms a year ago and was moved over to Raw; they ended up losing to Sikoa, Fatu, and Tama at Crown Jewel. Former honorary member Sami Zayn would join Reigns' group, reuniting the original iteration of The Bloodline (Reigns, The Usos, and Zayn). They, alongside CM Punk, would defeat Sikoa's Bloodline and Bronson Reed in a WarGames match at Survivor Series: WarGames. On the December 13 episode of SmackDown, Reigns challenged Sikoa to face him in Tribal Combat for the Ula Fala and title of Tribal Chief on the debut episode of Raw on Netflix, which was later made official. On the January 3 episode, Sikoa stated that if Reigns won, Heyman himself could put the Ula Fala on Reigns, and that Sikoa would recognize Reigns as Tribal Chief, but if Sikoa won, Heyman would have to put the Ula Fala on him, and become Sikoa's wiseman.

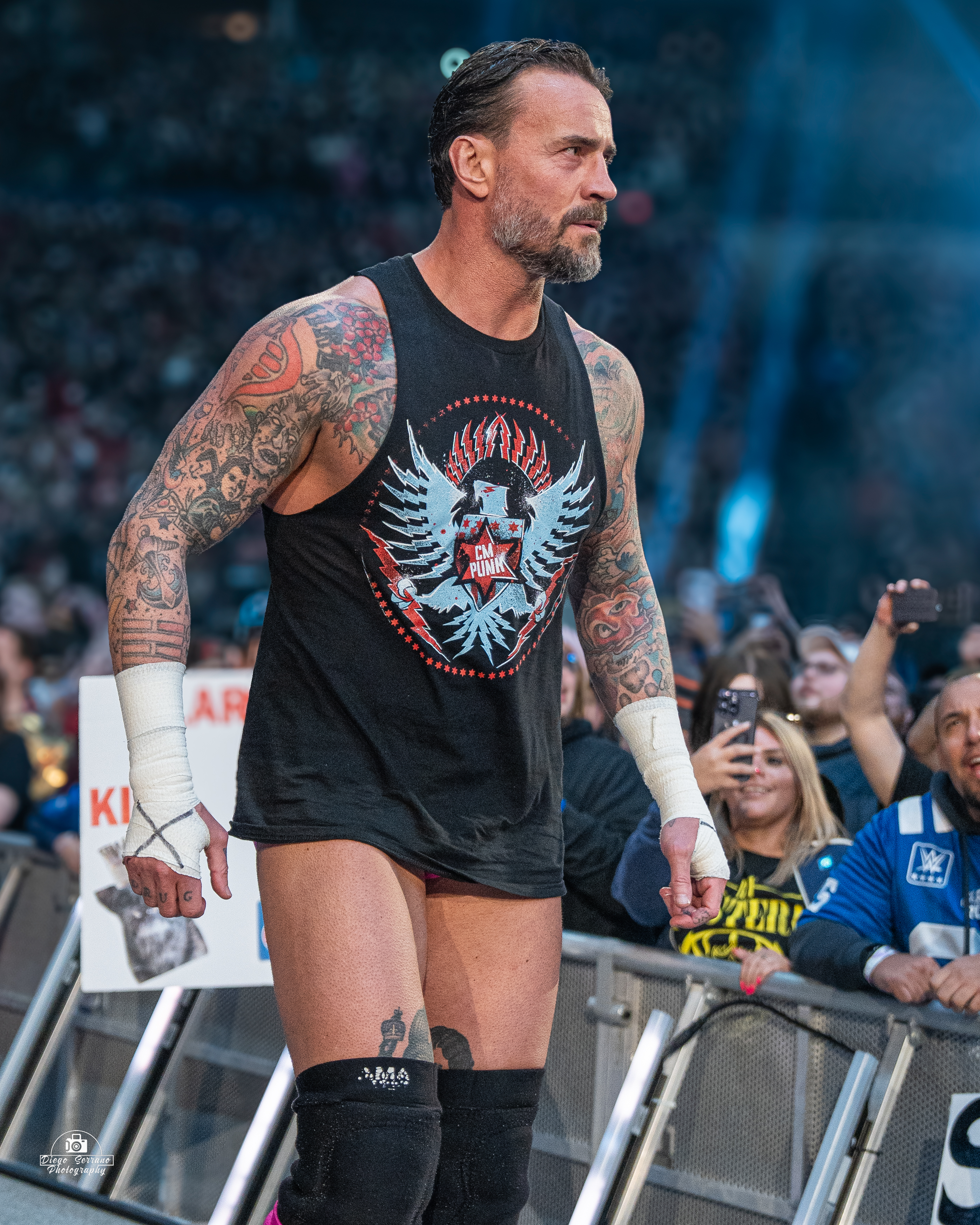
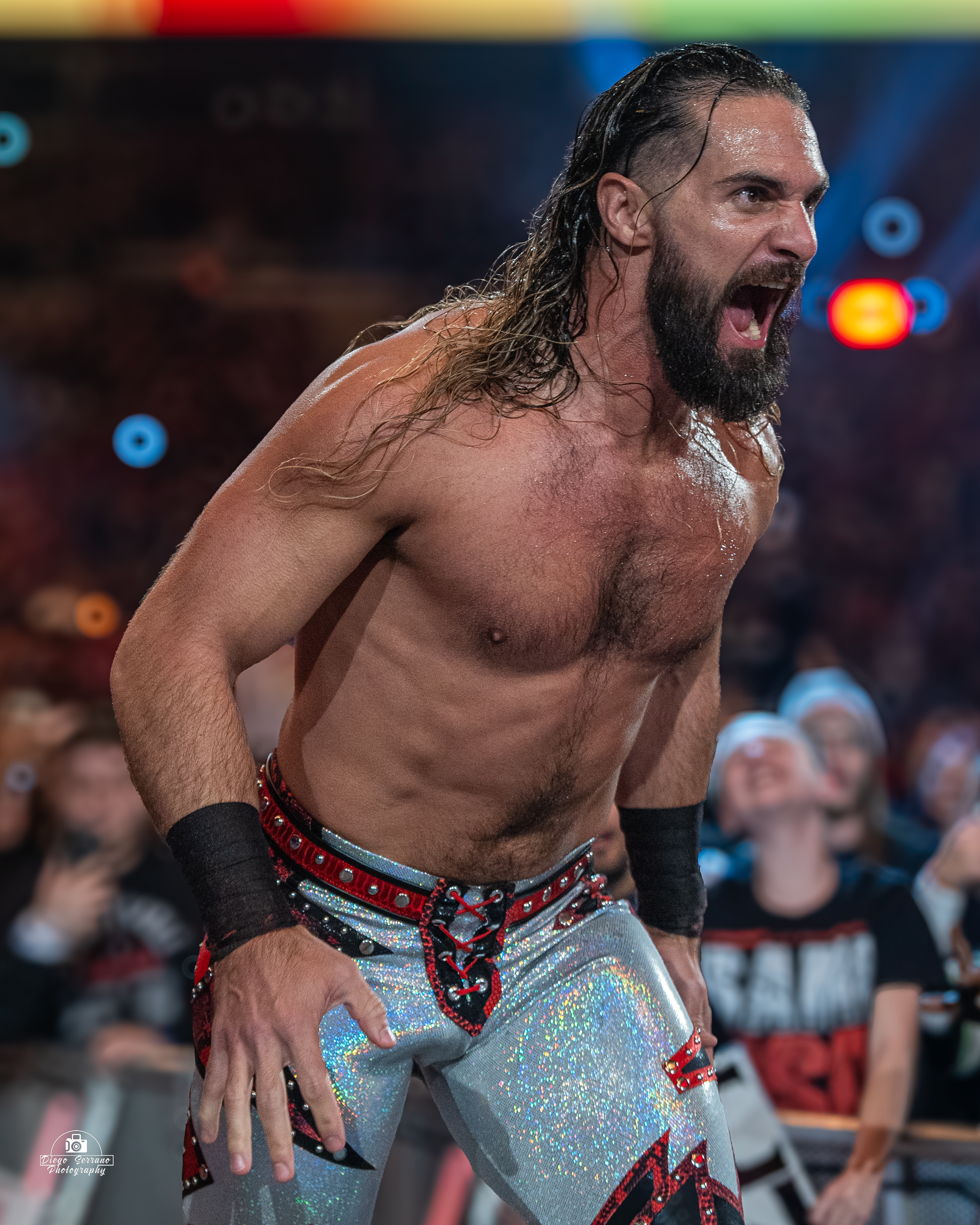
CM Punk wrestled Seth "Freakin" Rollins in the main event of the show.

At Survivor Series WarGames on November 25, 2023, immediately following the men's WarGames match that Seth "Freakin" Rollins participated in, CM Punk made a surprise return to WWE after a nearly 10-year absence, much to the chagrin of Rollins. The two would continue feuding throughout 2024 during Punk's feud with Drew McIntyre. Rollins, who had also feuded with McIntyre over the World Heavyweight Championship, served as the special guest referee for the match between Punk and McIntyre at SummerSlam, which Punk lost after he attacked Rollins, believing he was trying to sabotage him. Their feud culminated on the December 16 episode of Raw as the two insulted each other before brawling throughout the arena. Later that night, Raw General Manager Adam Pearce announced that Punk and Rollins would face each other on the debut episode of Raw on Netflix.

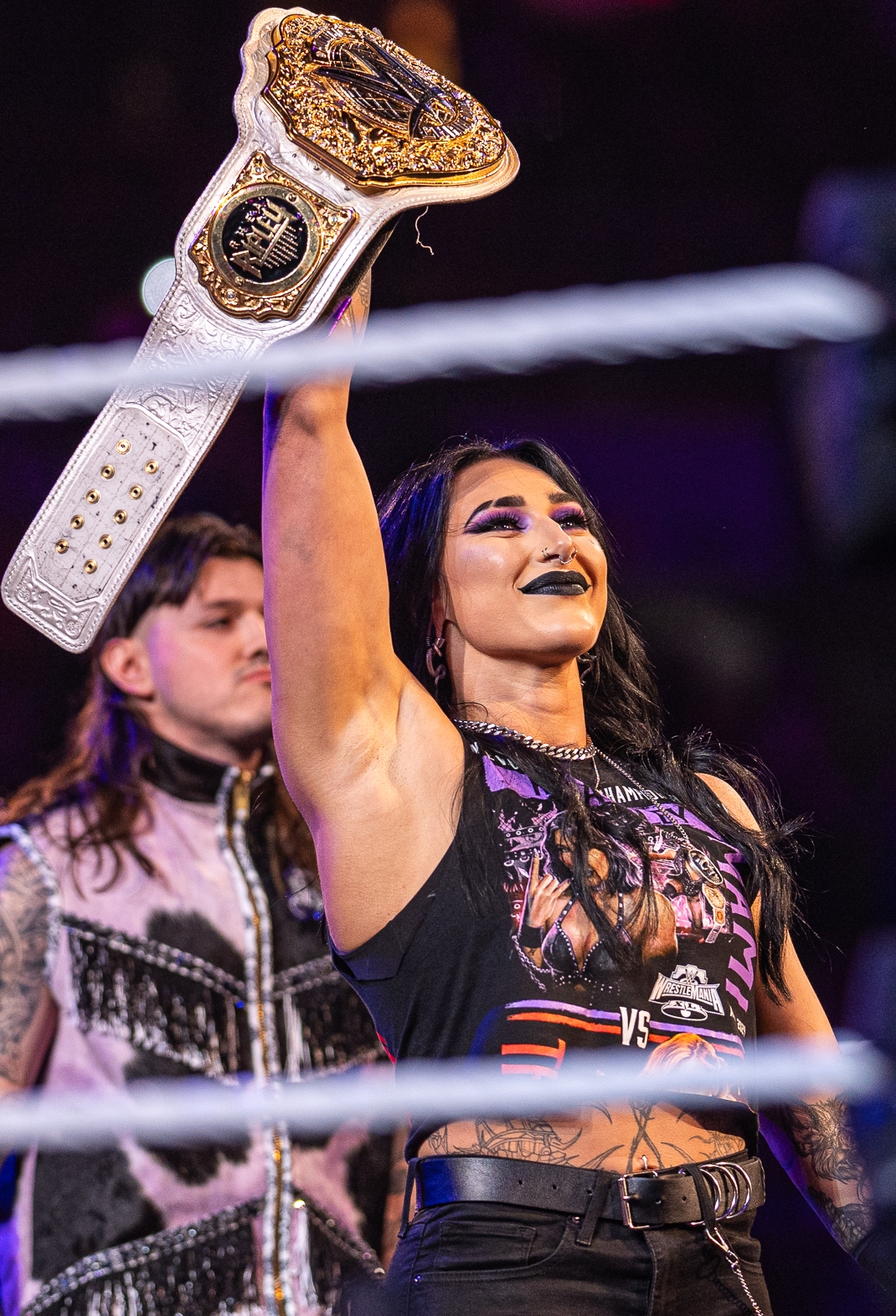
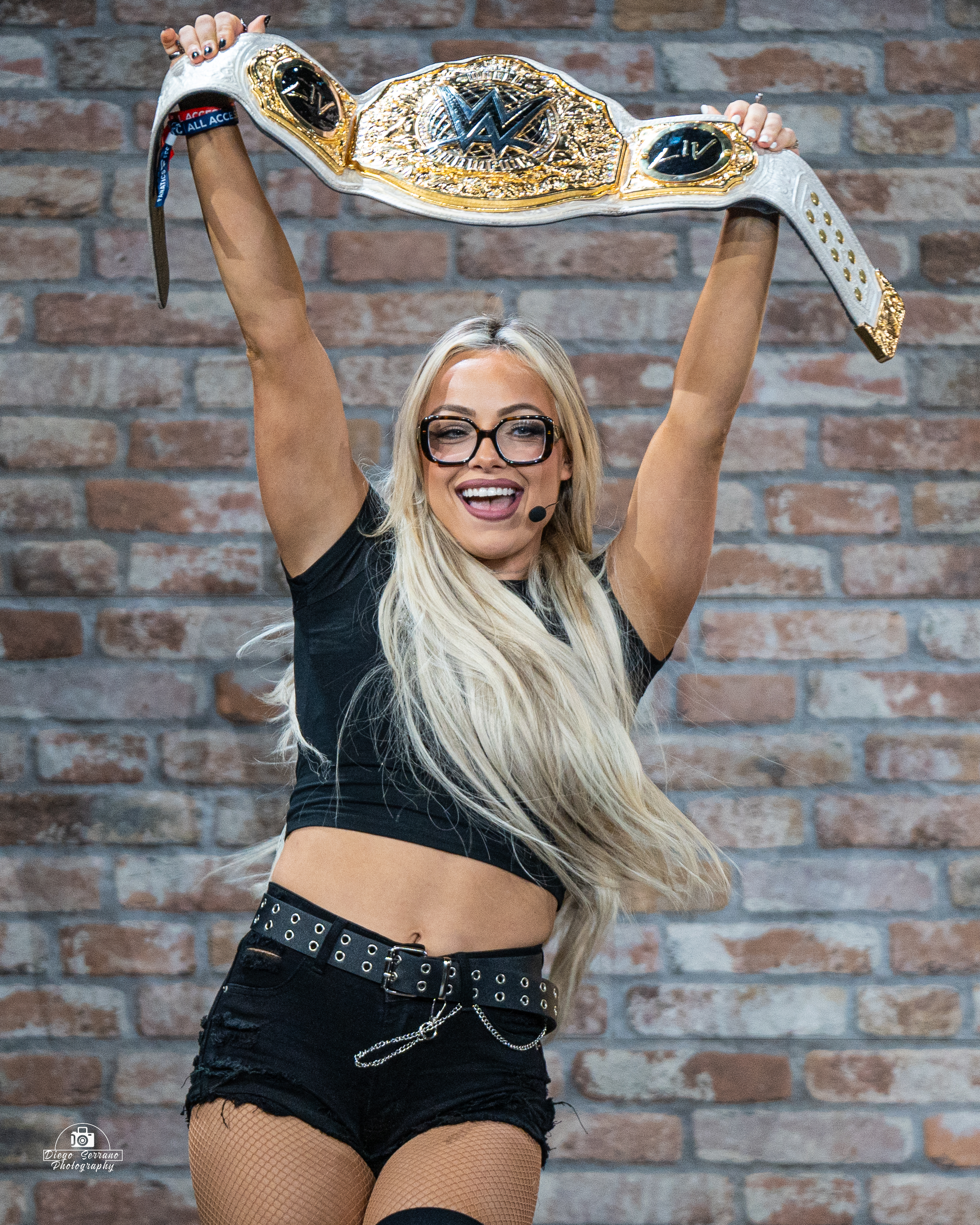
Rhea Ripley challenged Liv Morgan for the Women's World Championship.

After Judgment Day's Rhea Ripley cost Liv Morgan and Raquel Rodriguez the WWE Women's Tag Team Championship in mid-2023, Ripley and Morgan were scheduled for a match. However, the match never began as Ripley viciously attacked Morgan with a steel chair, injuring Morgan's shoulder and taking her out for several months. Morgan made her return at the 2024 Royal Rumble in January, and embarked on a "revenge tour", with her goal to take the Women's World Championship from Ripley due to Ripley taking months of her career. At Elimination Chamber: Perth, Morgan was unsuccessful in the eponymous match for a Women's World Championship match at WrestleMania XL, becoming the last participant to be eliminated by the eventual winner Becky Lynch. Ripley would retain her title against Lynch on Night 1 of WrestleMania. On the post-WrestleMania episode of Raw on April 8, Ripley was attacked by Morgan backstage, legitimately injuring her right arm and forced her to vacate the championship after a 380 day reign. Over the next few weeks, Morgan began to display more villainous traits. At King and Queen of the Ring, Morgan won the Women's World Championship after accidental interference from Ripley's onscreen love interest and Judgment Day stablemate, "Dirty" Dominik Mysterio. Morgan would subsequently interfere in the Judgment Day's matches to their advantage. Following Ripley's return on the July 8 episode of Raw, a title match between Ripley and Morgan was scheduled for SummerSlam, where Morgan defeated Ripley to retain the Women's World Championship following seemingly accidental interference from Mysterio. After the match, however, Mysterio betrayed Ripley and kissed Morgan, ending their partnership. Ripley was subsequently kicked out of the group, with Morgan taking her place. After Ripley pinned Morgan in a mixed tag team match which also involved Mysterio at Bash in Berlin, a rematch for the championship took place at Bad Blood, where Ripley won by disqualification after being attacked by the returning Rodriguez. Since championships do not change hands via disqualification or countout unless stipulated, Morgan remained champion. Rodriguez also became the newest member of The Judgment Day. At Survivor Series WarGames on November 30, Ripley's team defeated Morgan's team in a WarGames match, with Ripley pinning Morgan. On the December 16 episode of Raw, Ripley announced that she was named by Raw General Manager Adam Pearce the number one contender for Morgan's championship, and on the Raw on Netflix kickoff event on December 18, it was announced that the match would take place on the debut episode of Raw on Netflix.

On the December 2 episode of Raw, Jey Uso was found attacked backstage by an unknown assailant, later revealed to be Drew McIntyre, who made his return from a short hiatus that night and revealed himself as Uso's attacker the following week. McIntyre subsequently vowed to destroy the original iteration of The Bloodline, who cost him the Undisputed WWE Universal Championship at Clash at the Castle in September 2022. Three weeks later, McIntyre attacked Uso again as a brawl ensued between the two men. Later that night, Uso requested a match against McIntyre for that night, but Raw General Manager Adam Pearce instead scheduled the match for the debut episode of Raw on Netflix.

== Reception ==
WWE and Netflix announced that the episode totaled 4.9 million global views, with the event averaging 2.6 million households in the US, up 307% (162% for US only) from the previous week's 1.596 million on USA Network's cable television. It was 116% higher than Raw's average 2024 US viewership of 1.2 million households and this event more than doubled the A18-49 audience compared to the previous year. It was also the first time Raw had surpassed the four million viewer mark since January 2018, and this was the highest viewed Raw since March 2015.

The episode featured a segment in which Hulk Hogan appeared, while also promoting his Real American Beer brand. His appearance received an overwhelmingly negative reaction and boos from the crowd. This would be Hogan’s final appearance in WWE before his death in July 2025.

== Aftermath ==
Four days after this event went live, the debut episode of Raw was edited by Netflix to remove profanities and shortened its runtime to 2 hours and 20 minutes, removing the ad breaks from the on demand version.

CM Punk and Seth "Freakin" Rollins' rivalry continued. At the Royal Rumble, Punk eliminated Rollins and Roman Reigns before his own elimination. Afterwards, Rollins performed two Curb Stomps on Reigns and also brawled with Punk. Punk and Rollins then faced each other in a Steel Cage match on the March 10 episode of Raw, which Rollins won after Reigns pulled him out of the cage in order to attack Rollins as revenge from the Royal Rumble. Afterwards, Reigns saw Paul Heyman tending to Punk in the ring, which angered Reigns, causing him to also attack Punk. On March 21, a triple threat match between Punk, Reigns, and Rollins was made official for WrestleMania 41.

== Results ==
No.	Results	Stipulations	Times
1	Roman Reigns (with Paul Heyman) defeated Solo Sikoa by pinfall	Tribal Combat for the Ula Fala and recognition of "Tribal Chief" of the Anoaʻi family	21:30
2	Rhea Ripley defeated Liv Morgan (c) (with "Dirty" Dominik Mysterio and Raquel Rodriguez) by pinfall	Singles match for the Women's World Championship	11:40
3	Jey Uso defeated Drew McIntyre by pinfall	Singles match	10:20
4	CM Punk defeated Seth "Freakin" Rollins by pinfall	Singles match	19:15
(c) / – the champion(s) heading into the match
