= AJ Styles and Omos =

Professional wrestling tag team

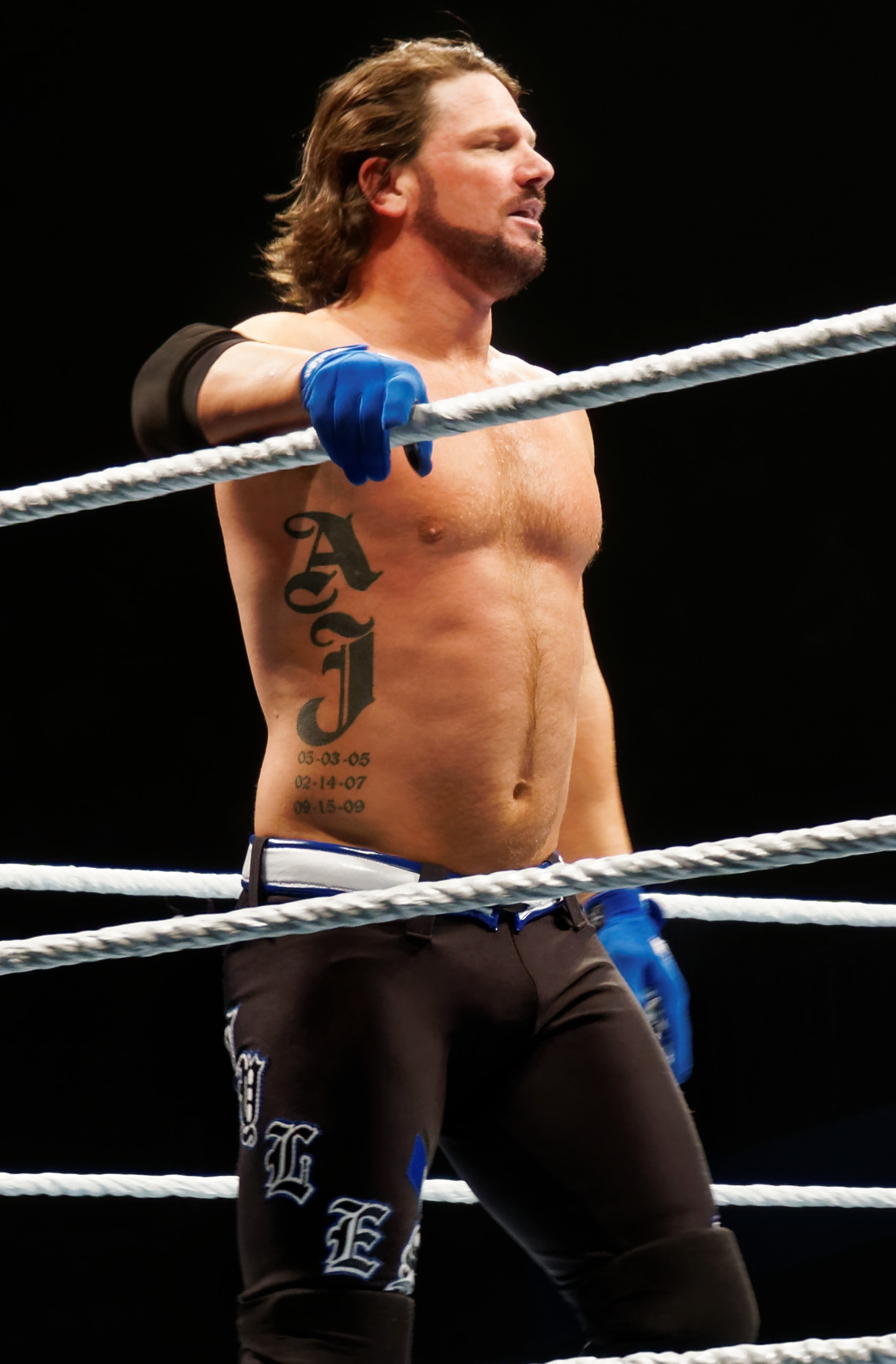
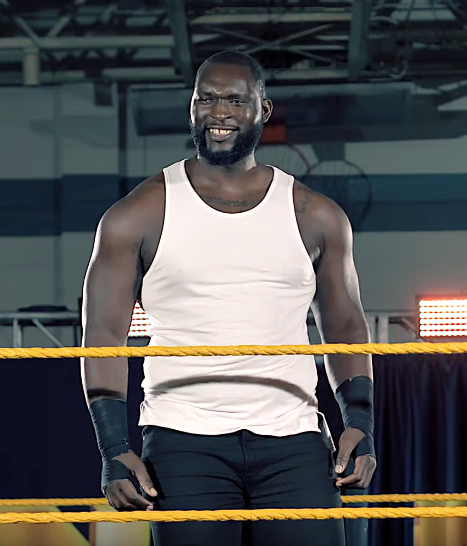
- AJ Styles (left) and Omos (right)

Tag team
- Members: AJ Styles; Omos
- Name: AJ Styles and Omos
- Billed heights: Styles: 5 ft 11 in (1.80 m); Omos: 7 ft 3 in (2.21 m)
- Combined billed weight: 618 lb (280 kg)
- Debut: October 19, 2020
- Disbanded: December 20, 2021
- Years active: 2020–2021

AJ Styles and Omos were a professional wrestling tag team in WWE on the Raw brand. The team were former WWE Raw Tag Team Champions. In October 2020, Omos debuted as Styles' "personal colossus" and aided him in his matches. At WrestleMania 37 in April 2021, Styles and Omos won the Raw Tag Team Championship and held it for 133 days before losing them at SummerSlam in August of that year.

== History ==
=== Formation and Raw Tag Team Champions (2020–2021) ===
After the departures of Luke Gallows and Karl Anderson in April 2020, which led to the dissolution of The O.C., AJ Styles was drafted to the Raw brand in October 2020 as part of the 2020 Draft. On the October 19 episode of Raw, Styles debuted a new bodyguard, Omos, before defeating Riddle. At TLC: Tables, Ladders & Chairs, Styles faced Drew McIntyre for the WWE Championship in a TLC match but failed to win as The Miz unsuccessfully cashed in his Money in the Bank briefcase during the match; Omos was involved in the match, preventing Miz from reaching the title and dropping him onto a table placed outside the ring before chasing John Morrison to the back. On January 31, 2021 at Royal Rumble, during the Royal Rumble match, Omos involved himself by preventing Styles from being eliminated on a few occasions. Omos eliminated Big E and Rey Mysterio despite not being in the match. He would also go on to help Styles enter the Elimination Chamber match early before being ejected by WWE official Adam Pearce.

On the March 22 episode of Raw, Styles and Omos challenged The New Day (Kofi Kingston and Xavier Woods) to a championship match at WrestleMania 37 which The New Day accepted. At WrestleMania, Styles and Omos captured the Raw Tag Team Championship and in the process, Styles also became the twenty-second WWE Grand Slam Champion, and the first to achieve both the WWE and Impact Grand Slam. Over the following months, Styles and Omos successfully defended the titles in rematches with The New Day and against Elias and Jaxson Ryker before entering into a feud with The Viking Raiders (Erik and Ivar). At the Money in the Bank event, Styles and Omos successfully defended the titles against The Viking Raiders. After this, Styles and Omos began feuding with Riddle and Randy Orton, who make the team of RK-Bro. After weeks of confronting each other, a match was made between Styles and Omos, and RK-Bro at SummerSlam for the titles. At the event, Styles and Omos lost the titles to RK-Bro, ending their reign at 133 days.

At Extreme Rules, Styles and Omos teamed with Bobby Lashley to take on The New Day in a six-man tag team match, in which Styles, Omos, and Lashley lost. After this, it was announced that Styles and Omos would face RK-Bro in a rematch for the tag team titles at Crown Jewel. At the event, they failed to regain the titles.

=== Breakup and aftermath (2021–2022) ===
At Survivor Series on November 21, Styles and Omos participated in a 25-man battle royal in honor of the 25th anniversary of The Rock's debut at the 1996 Survivor Series. Despite Styles being eliminated, Omos had the most eliminations at 12 and won the match by last eliminating Ricochet. On the December 20 episode of Raw, after weeks of tension and speculation, Omos attacked Styles, breaking up the tag team.

On the January 3, 2022, episode of Raw, a week after splitting up from Styles, a match was set up between the two on Raw, where Omos defeated Styles. On January 29, at the Royal Rumble, Omos entered the namesake match for the first time in his career at number 11, where he earned three eliminations before being eliminated by Styles alongside five other wrestlers. In the following months, Styles began feuding with Edge and his new stable The Judgment Day, while Omos found a manager in MVP and began a feud with Bobby Lashley.

== Championships and accomplishments ==
- WWE
  - WWE Raw Tag Team Championship (1 time)
  - Thirty-second Triple Crown Champion – Styles
  - Fifteenth Grand Slam Champion (under current format; Twenty-second overall) – Styles
  - The Rock's 25th Anniversary 25-Man Battle Royal – Omos
