= Money in the Bank (2021) =

WWE pay-per-view and livestreaming event

- Promotional poster featuring Bianca Belair
- Promotion: WWE
- Brand(s): Raw; SmackDown
- Date: July 18, 2021
- City: Fort Worth, Texas
- Venue: Dickies Arena
- Attendance: 14,541

WWE event chronology
← Previous; Hell in a Cell	Next → SummerSlam

Money in the Bank chronology
← Previous; 2020	Next → 2022

The 2021 Money in the Bank was a professional wrestling pay-per-view (PPV) and livestreaming event produced by WWE, held for wrestlers from the promotion's main roster brands, Raw and SmackDown. It was the 12th annual Money in the Bank event and took place on July 18, 2021, at Dickies Arena in Fort Worth, Texas. The event centered on the Money in the Bank ladder match, a multi-person ladder match where the wrestlers compete to retrieve a briefcase hanging above the ring which contains a contract for a guaranteed world championship match at any time within the next year.

During the height of the COVID-19 pandemic from March 2020 to July 2021, WWE had presented its shows behind closed doors, first from the WWE Performance Center in Orlando, Florida, then moving in August 2020 to a bio-secure bubble called the WWE ThunderDome, hosted at three different venues in the U.S. state of Florida, excluding WrestleMania 37 in April 2021, which was the company's first major event to have live ticketed fans since the pandemic began, although to a limited capacity. With declining cases and the availability of vaccines, WWE left the ThunderDome and returned to a live touring schedule in mid-July 2021, beginning with Friday Night SmackDown two days prior to Money in the Bank. As a result, this was the company's first PPV and livestreaming event held with a full capacity crowd and no COVID restrictions. It was also the first such event held outside of Florida since Elimination Chamber in March 2020, and subsequently the first Money in the Bank to take place in the state of Texas. This was also the first Money in the Bank event to livestream on SonyLIV in India and Peacock in the United States following the shutdown of the Indian version of the WWE Network in February and the American version in April.

Seven matches were contested at the event, including one on the Kickoff pre-show. In the main event, Roman Reigns defeated Edge to retain SmackDown's Universal Championship. Additionally, SmackDown's Big E and Raw's Nikki A.S.H. won the respective men's and women's Money in the Bank ladder matches. In other prominent matches, Bobby Lashley defeated Kofi Kingston to retain Raw's WWE Championship and Charlotte Flair defeated Rhea Ripley to win her record-tying fifth Raw Women's Championship and 13th overall singles championship in the women's division. The event also saw the surprise return of John Cena, appearing for the first time since WrestleMania 36 in April 2020.

This event's Kickoff pre-show is also notable for marking the beginning of The Usos's (Jey Uso and Jimmy Uso) fifth reign as SmackDown Tag Team Champions. On the pre-show, they defeated The Mysterios (Rey Mysterio and Dominik Mysterio) to win the title, with the reign lasting for 622 days, ending at WrestleMania 39 Night 1 on April 1, 2023. This set the record for both the longest reign in the championship's history and the longest reign for any male tag team championship in company history.

== Production ==
=== Background ===
Money in the Bank is an annual professional wrestling event produced by WWE since 2010, generally held between May and July. It was originally broadcast exclusively via pay-per-view (PPV) before it began simultaneously livestreaming on the WWE Network in 2014. The concept of the event comes from WWE's established Money in the Bank ladder match.

The 12th Money in the Bank event was initially scheduled for May 16, 2021, however, it switched dates with WrestleMania Backlash and was to take place on June 20 until Hell in a Cell was announced for that date with Money in the Bank then pushed back to July 18, which had originally been the reported date for Extreme Rules. It was also reported that Money in the Bank would be held with live ticketed fans in attendance. Since August 2020, WWE had presented Raw and SmackDown's shows from a bio-secure bubble called the WWE ThunderDome due to the COVID-19 pandemic, which was hosted at three different venues in the U.S. state of Florida. With cases declining and vaccines available to most American citizens, the company announced that it would be leaving the ThunderDome and returning to live touring, starting with a 25-city tour that would begin with the July 16, 2021, episode of Friday Night SmackDown in Houston, Texas. Money in the Bank was in turn announced to take place at Dickies Arena in Fort Worth, Texas on July 18, marking WWE's first PPV and livestreaming event held outside of Florida since Elimination Chamber on March 8, 2020, and the first held following the end of the ThunderDome Era, as well as the first Money in the Bank to be held in the state of Texas. It was also the first to be held in July since the 2013 event.

The Money in the Bank ladder match features multiple wrestlers using ladders to retrieve a briefcase hanging above the ring. The briefcase contains a contract that guarantees the winner a match for a world championship at any time within the next year. Male wrestlers competed for a contract to grant them a match for either Raw's WWE Championship or SmackDown's Universal Championship, while female wrestlers competed for a Raw Women's Championship or SmackDown Women's Championship match contract. While the previous year's event had featured a "Corporate Ladder" gimmick, which took place at WWE's headquarters at the time, Titan Towers in Stamford, Connecticut, and had only six competitors in each match due to the COVID-19 pandemic, the 2021 event reverted to the standard version of the titular ladder match as well as returning to having eight competitors for both matches, evenly divided between the two brands.

=== Broadcast outlets ===
The event was broadcast on traditional PPV worldwide. It was also available to livestream on Peacock in the United States, SonyLIV in India, and the WWE Network everywhere else. This was the first Money in the Bank to livestream on SonyLIV and Peacock, following the shutdown of the Indian version of the WWE Network in February< and the American version in April.

=== Storylines ===
The event comprised seven matches, including one on the Kickoff pre-show, that resulted from scripted storylines. Results were predetermined by WWE's writers on the Raw and SmackDown brands, while storylines were produced on WWE's weekly television shows, Monday Night Raw and Friday Night SmackDown.

In the main event of Night 2 of WrestleMania 37, Roman Reigns defeated Edge and Daniel Bryan in a triple threat match to retain the Universal Championship. On the June 25 episode of SmackDown, Reigns and his special counsel Paul Heyman had a Universal Championship address. Heyman stated that Reigns had defeated all of SmackDown's top contenders and that there was no one left to challenge Reigns. Edge then made a surprise return after a two-month hiatus and attacked Reigns and also took out Jimmy Uso, who had come to Reigns's aid. On Talking Smack the next day, it was revealed that Edge had confronted WWE officials Adam Pearce and Sonya Deville and demanded a one-on-one match against Reigns for the title at Money in the Bank, which he was originally supposed to have at WrestleMania before Bryan worked his way into the match. Pearce then granted him the match. The following week, Edge explained that the loss at WrestleMania affected him mentally, which is why he had taken the past two months off.

Qualifying matches for the men's Money in the Bank ladder match began on the June 21 episode of Raw. Ricochet, John Morrison, and Riddle qualified by defeating AJ Styles, Randy Orton, and Drew McIntyre, respectively. Raw's final spot was determined in a triple threat match the following week, which was originally scheduled to be between Styles, Orton, and McIntyre; however, Orton was unable to compete for unknown reasons. A battle royal was held to fill Orton's spot in the triple threat match. Orton's RK-Bro tag team partner Riddle convinced WWE officials Adam Pearce and Sonya Deville to allow him to compete in the battle royal where if he won, he would represent Orton in the triple threat match. Although Riddle won the battle royal, McIntyre won the triple threat match to earn Raw's final spot in the Money in the Bank ladder match. SmackDown's first spot was filled by Big E, who qualified by defeating Apollo Crews on the June 25 episode of SmackDown. The following week, Kevin Owens qualified by defeating Sami Zayn in a Last Man Standing match, which was a rematch from Hell in a Cell that Zayn had won. SmackDown's last two spots were filled on the July 9 episode: Seth Rollins defeated Cesaro, which was another rematch from Hell in a Cell that Rollins had also won, and King Nakamura defeated Baron Corbin, previously King Corbin before he lost his King of the Ring crown to Shinsuke Nakamura, who took on the king moniker.

Qualifying matches for the women's Money in the Bank ladder match also began on the June 21 episode of Raw. The brand's four participants were determined by two tag team matches in which the members of the winning teams qualified. Asuka and Naomi qualified by defeating the team of Eva Marie and Doudrop (formerly Piper Niven in NXT UK) and later, Alexa Bliss and Nikki Cross, the latter incorporating a superhero gimmick and a new nickname of Nikki A.S.H. (short for Almost a Super Hero), qualified by defeating the team of Nia Jax and Shayna Baszler. On the June 25 episode of SmackDown, WWE official Sonya Deville named two-time Money in the Bank winner Carmella as the first of SmackDown's four participants. Liv Morgan, who had been feuding with Carmella and defeated her two weeks earlier, took issue as Carmella did not compete in a qualifier match to earn her spot. Deville then had Morgan face Carmella to prove she deserved to be in the match and Morgan subsequently defeated Carmella; however, Deville did not add her to the ladder match. The following week, Deville named Zelina Vega, who made her return to WWE after her release in November 2020, as the second SmackDown entrant in the match. Morgan again confronted Deville about Vega not having to qualify. She also pointed out the fact that she proved herself by defeating Carmella and was not added, but would prove herself again in a match against Vega. Morgan subsequently defeated Vega, but was still not added. On the July 9 episode, Carmella was removed from the match as she was named as Bayley's replacement in the SmackDown Women's Championship match against Bianca Belair due to Bayley suffering an injury. Morgan once again confronted Deville about her giving Carmella an opportunity despite not earning one; although annoyed at Morgan's interruption, Deville named Morgan as Carmella's replacement in the Money in the Bank ladder match. WWE Women's Tag Team Champions Natalya and Tamina were announced as SmackDown's last two participants on July 12 and July 15, respectively, via Twitter.

On the June 21 episode of Raw, as WWE Champion Bobby Lashley and his manager MVP were celebrating Lashley's win over Drew McIntyre at Hell in a Cell the previous night, they were interrupted by The New Day (Kofi Kingston and Xavier Woods). Kingston reminded Lashley that he had defeated him in a non-title match on the May 17 episode of Raw and that he had also never received a rematch for the title after he lost the championship to Brock Lesnar at SmackDown's 20th Anniversary in October 2019. Kingston then challenged Lashley for the title. Lashley accepted and the match was scheduled for Money in the Bank.

At Hell in a Cell, Charlotte Flair defeated Raw Women's Champion Rhea Ripley by disqualification after Ripley attacked Flair with the top cover of the announce table; however, since titles do not change hands via disqualification unless stipulated, Flair did not win the title. The following night on Raw, Flair claimed she was "proud" of Ripley and told Ripley that she had never seen her as a "strategic champion". WWE official Sonya Deville then scheduled a rematch between the two for the title at Money in the Bank.

On the June 7 episode of Raw, The Viking Raiders (Erik and Ivar) won a tag team battle royal to earn a match against AJ Styles and Omos for the Raw Tag Team Championship at a future date. On the July 12 episode, Ivar defeated Styles, while Omos defeated Erik in Omos's first singles match. That same day, the title match was scheduled for Money in the Bank.

On the May 28 episode of SmackDown, The Usos (Jey Uso and Jimmy Uso) teamed up for the first time in over a year and defeated The Street Profits (Angelo Dawkins and Montez Ford) to become the number one contenders for The Mysterios's (Rey Mysterio and Dominik Mysterio) SmackDown Tag Team Championship. The following week, however, The Usos failed to win the title not once, but twice. The first time, Dominik pinned Jimmy despite Jimmy's shoulder being off the mat. The second time, Universal Champion Roman Reigns attacked Dominik, causing a disqualification. Afterwards, Reigns continued his attack on The Mysterios. On the June 11 episode, Rey challenged Reigns for the Universal Championship. The match was later scheduled for Hell in a Cell as a Hell in a Cell match, but was later rescheduled to the June 18 episode of SmackDown, where Reigns retained. The Mysterios returned on the July 9 episode of SmackDown to assist Edge in attacking Reigns and The Usos. The following week, Reigns and The Usos defeated Edge and The Mysterios in a six-man tag team match. Earlier that night, another title match between The Usos and The Mysterios was scheduled for the Kickoff pre-show.

==== Canceled match ====
At Hell in a Cell, Bianca Belair defeated Bayley in a Hell in a Cell match to retain the SmackDown Women's Championship. On the following episode of SmackDown, both were involved in a mixed tag team match in which Bayley pinned Belair. The following week, Bayley claimed that Belair's Hell in a Cell victory was a fluke, citing her own victory over Belair in the mixed tag team match. Belair then came out and challenged Bayley to an "I Quit" match with the title on the line at Money in the Bank and Bayley accepted. On July 9, however, WWE announced that Bayley suffered a legitimate injury while training that would sideline her for up to nine months; this was followed by an announcement that a replacement for Bayley would be revealed on that night's SmackDown. Carmella was revealed as the replacement and the match was changed to a regular singles match that would instead occur on the July 16 episode of SmackDown, where Belair retained. This also resulted in WWE moving the Raw Tag Team Championship match pitting AJ Styles and Omos against The Viking Raiders (Erik and Ivar) from the July 12 episode of Raw to the Money in the Bank event in order to fill the slot in the match card vacated by the cancellation of the former.

== Event ==
Other on-screen personnel
Role:	Name:
English commentators	Michael Cole (SmackDown)
English commentators	Pat McAfee (SmackDown)
English commentators	Jimmy Smith (Raw)
English commentators	Corey Graves (Raw)
English commentators	Byron Saxton (Raw)
Spanish commentators	Carlos Cabrera
Spanish commentators	Marcelo Rodriguez
Ring announcers	Greg Hamilton (SmackDown)
Ring announcers	Mike Rome (Raw)
Referees	Danilo Anfibio
Referees	Jason Ayers
Referees	Jessika Carr
Referees	Darrick Moore
Referees	Eddie Orengo
Referees	Chad Patton
Referees	Charles Robinson
Referees	Rod Zapata
Interviewer	Kevin Patrick
Pre-show panel	Kayla Braxton
Pre-show panel	John "Bradshaw" Layfield
Pre-show panel	Peter Rosenberg
Pre-show panel	Booker T
Pre-show panel	Jerry Lawler
Pre-show panel	Sonya Deville

=== Pre-show ===
During the Money in the Bank Kickoff pre-show, The Mysterios (Rey Mysterio and Dominik Mysterio) defended the SmackDown Tag Team Championship against The Usos (Jey Uso and Jimmy Uso). During the match, Jey caught Rey with a Superkick in mid-air and then performed the Uso Splash on Rey for a nearfall. In the end, as Rey attempted a 619 on Jey, Jimmy protected Jey with Jimmy receiving the 619 instead. Jey then performed a roll-up on Rey with an assist from Jimmy to win the title for the fifth time, and their seventh overall tag team championship in WWE. This would mark the beginning of The Usos's record-setting title reign, which currently stands as the longest tag team title reign in WWE at 622 days.

=== Preliminary matches ===
The actual event opened with the women's Money in the Bank ladder match, featuring Alexa Bliss, Asuka, Naomi, and Nikki A.S.H. from Raw and Liv Morgan, Zelina Vega, and WWE Women's Tag Team Champions, Natalya and Tamina, from SmackDown. During the match, Bliss used her supernatural powers to try and lower the contract into her hands only for Vega to stop her. Later atop a ladder, Bliss hypnotized Vega into climbing down the ladder and allowing Bliss an opportunity to unhook the briefcase, however, Natalya intercepted Bliss. The rest of the competitors eventually buried Bliss under a pile of ladders, taking Bliss out for the remainder of the match. With three ladders positioned under the briefcase, Asuka, Naomi, Morgan, Vega, Natalya, and Tamina all fought atop of the three ladders. Nikki, who had been down outside the ring, used the opportunity to quickly climb the middle ladder and reach over the other competitors to unhook the briefcase and win the match.

Next, AJ Styles and Omos defended the Raw Tag Team Championship against The Viking Raiders (Erik and Ivar). In the end, Erik and Ivar performed The Viking Experience on Styles, however, Omos stood on the ring apron and shoved Erik into Ivar to void the pin attempt. Omos then delivered a Two-Handed Chokeslam on Erik to retain the title.

After that, Bobby Lashley (accompanied by MVP) defended Raw's WWE Championship against Kofi Kingston. At the start of the match, Kingston performed a Double Stomp on Lashley's chest for a nearfall. Following this, Lashley completely dominated Kingston for the remainder of the match. After Kingston refused to submit to the Hurt Lock, Lashley performed the Dominator three times on Kingston before applying the Hurt Lock again, causing Kingston to pass out and retain the title.

In the fourth match, Rhea Ripley defended the Raw Women's Championship against Charlotte Flair. After a well contested match, as Ripley went for the Riptide, Flair countered into a DDT. Flair performed the Natural Selection on Ripley off the second rope for a nearfall. Ripley performed a German Suplex on Flair who rolled out of the ring. Flair rammed Ripley's head in a turnbuckle and trapped her leg in between the steel steps and the corner post, kicking it several times. Flair then got Ripley back in the ring and applied the Figure Eight Leglock on her to win the title for a record-tying fifth time, marking her 13th overall singles championship in WWE and 14th title overall.

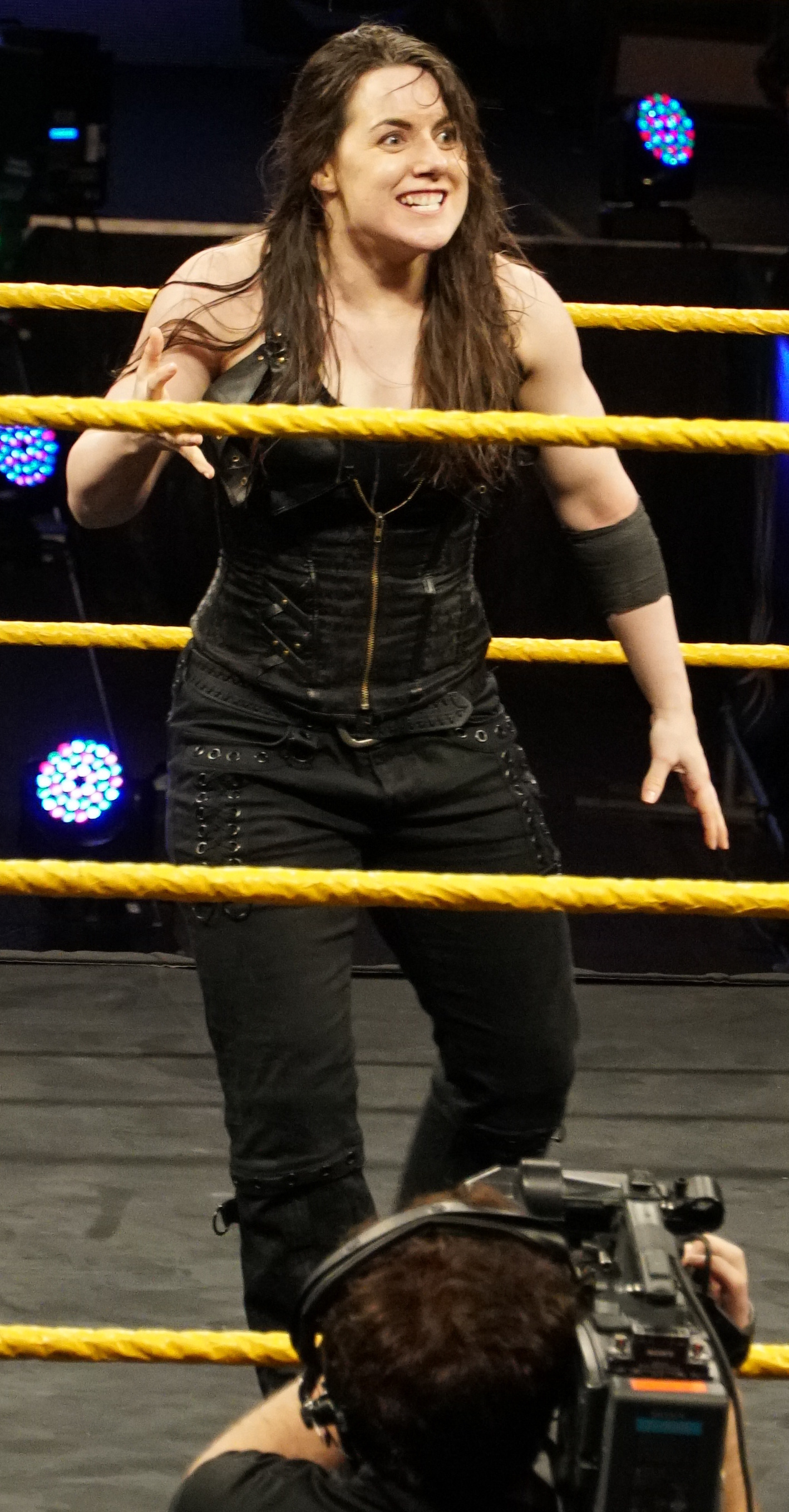
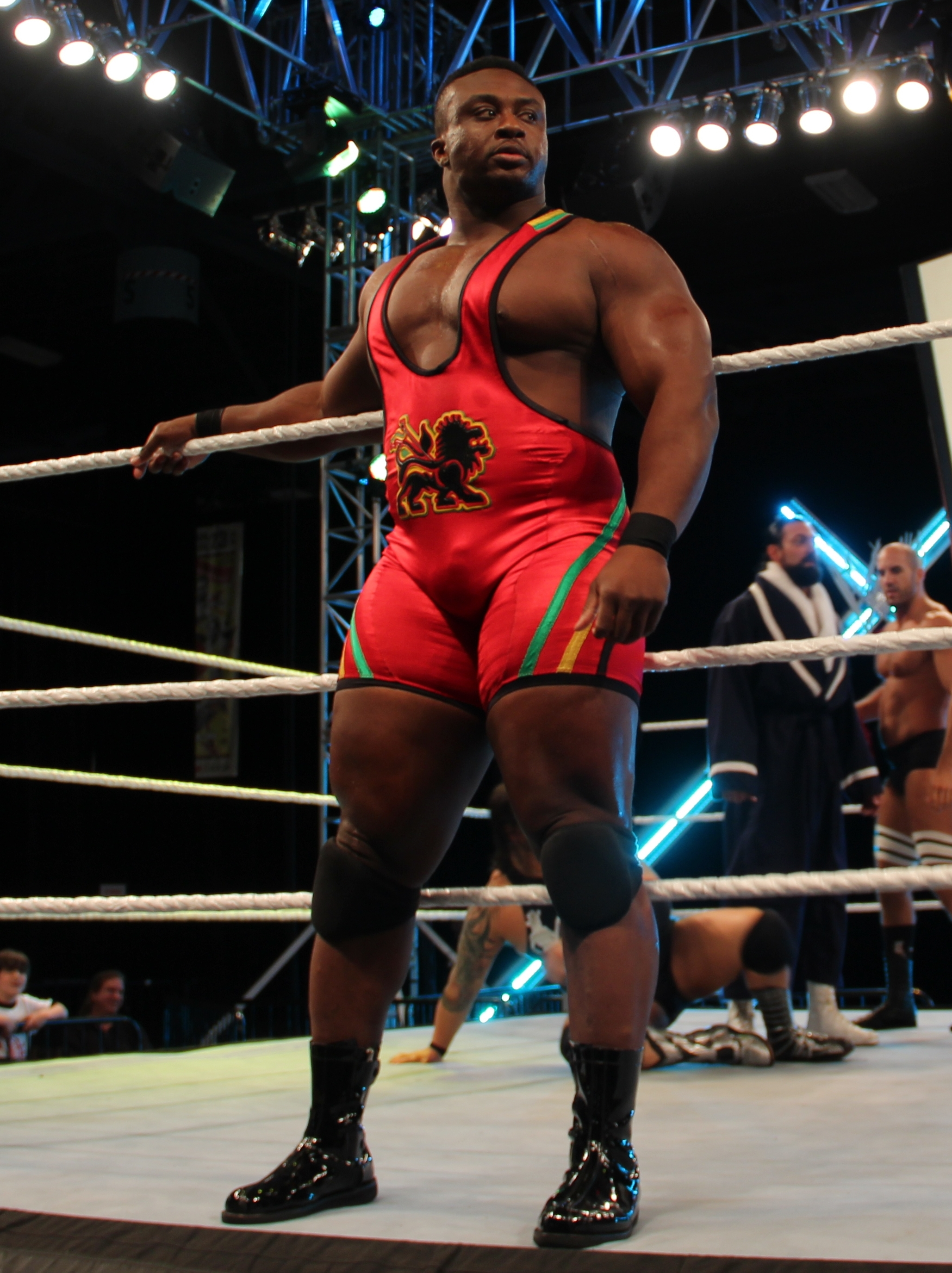
Raw's Nikki A.S.H. (shown here under her previous gimmick of Nikki Cross) and SmackDown's Big E were the respective winners of the men's and women's Money in the Bank ladder matches.

The penultimate match was the men's Money in the Bank ladder match, featuring Drew McIntyre, John Morrison, Ricochet, and Riddle from Raw and Big E, Kevin Owens, King Nakamura, and Seth Rollins from SmackDown. During the match, as McIntyre ascended the ladder, he was attacked by Jinder Mahal with a steel chair and was carried off by Mahal's henchmen Shanky and Veer—continuing a rivalry that had recently begun on Raw. As Ricochet ascended the ladder, Riddle tipped the ladder over and Ricochet jumped onto the other competitors, who were outside the ring. Riddle and Owens performed the RKO and Stunner, respectively, on the remaining competitors. As Owens ascended the ladder, Rollins pulled Owens off, performing a Powerbomb on Owens through a ladder that was wedged between the apron and announce table. As Rollins ascended the ladder, Big E stopped him and performed the Big Ending on Rollins off the ladder. Big E then ascended the ladder and unhooked the briefcase to win the match.

=== Main event ===
In the main event, Roman Reigns (accompanied by Paul Heyman) defended SmackDown's Universal Championship against Edge. During the match, Reigns and Edge brawled at ringside. As Reigns attempted the Spear, Edge moved out of the way and Reigns went through the barricade. Edge then performed a Spear on Reigns through the remainder of the barricade. Back in the ring, as Reigns performed the Superman Punch on Edge, Edge incapacitated the referee. Reigns obtained a broken piece of a chair and attempted to apply the Crossface on Edge, however, Edge reversed and applied the Crossface on Reigns. The Usos (Jey and Jimmy) then came out and attempted to interfere in the match, however this was thwarted by Rey and Dominik Mysterio, who attacked them before they reached the ring. Seth Rollins, frustrated over losing the Money in the Bank ladder match earlier as well as for Edge receiving the championship match before him, then came out and performed a Superkick on Edge. As Reigns attempted a Spear, Edge performed a Spear of his own for a nearfall. Rollins then returned to the ring, only for Edge to knock him off the apron. This brief distraction allowed Reigns to perform a Spear on Edge and retain the title. Following the match, as Reigns and Rollins had a stare down, Edge attacked Rollins and they brawled into the crowd. As Reigns obtained a microphone and proclaimed that the whole world needed to acknowledge him, John Cena made a surprise return—in his first appearance since WrestleMania 36 in April 2020—and entered the ring where Cena had a stare down with Reigns and performed his "You Can't See Me" taunt at Reigns to end the event.

== Reception ==
Though the event itself was well-received, Peacock's streaming of the event in the United States was poorly received due to technical issues occurring throughout, particularly during the men's Money in the Bank ladder match.

Dave Meltzer rated the men's Money in the Bank ladder match 4.75 stars, which was the highest of the night. Roman Reigns vs. Edge and Charlotte Flair vs. Rhea Ripley both received 4.25 stars. The women's Money in the Bank ladder match and Bobby Lashley vs. Kofi Kingston received 2 stars, the lowest rated matches of the night. The Raw Tag Team Championship match received 2.5 stars, and the kick-off show match received 3.5 stars.

== Aftermath ==
=== Raw ===
Following his dominant victory over Kofi Kingston, Bobby Lashley (accompanied by MVP) held an open challenge for the WWE Championship on the following night's episode of Raw. The challenge was accepted by a returning Keith Lee, who had been out with health issues since February, but lost to Lashley. Following the match, Lashley and MVP were confronted by WWE Hall of Famer Goldberg, appearing for the first time since the Royal Rumble in January. Goldberg proclaimed that he would be Lashley's next challenger, which was scheduled for SummerSlam.

Also on the following Raw, as Charlotte Flair boasted about winning the Raw Women's Championship for a fifth time, she was confronted by Rhea Ripley, who challenged her to a rematch that night which was granted by WWE officials Adam Pearce and Sonya Deville. During the match, Flair was disqualified after striking Ripley with the championship belt, thus Ripley won the match but not the title. Following the match, the two brawled at ringside where Ripley performed the Riptide on Flair. Nikki A.S.H. then ran down to the ring and cashed in her Money in the Bank contract and defeated Flair to win the Raw Women's Championship. The following week, Nikki was scheduled to defend the title against Flair and Ripley in a triple threat match at SummerSlam.

Also on Raw, Riddle teamed with The Viking Raiders (Erik and Ivar) in a six-man tag team match against John Morrison and Raw Tag Team Champions AJ Styles and Omos in which The Viking Raiders performed The Viking Experience on Morrison to win the match. Styles and Omos were subsequently scheduled to defend the Raw Tag Team Championship in a rematch against The Viking Raiders on the following week's episode, where Styles and Omos again retained.

Jinder Mahal, along with Shanky and Veer, gloated about costing Drew McIntyre the Money in the Bank ladder match. McIntyre then appeared and attacked Mahal and Veer with a steel chair. As Shanky tried to calm McIntyre down, McIntyre attacked Shanky with multiple chair shots. After a couple more weeks of feuding, a match between McIntyre and Mahal was scheduled for SummerSlam with Shanky and Veer banned from ringside.

=== SmackDown ===
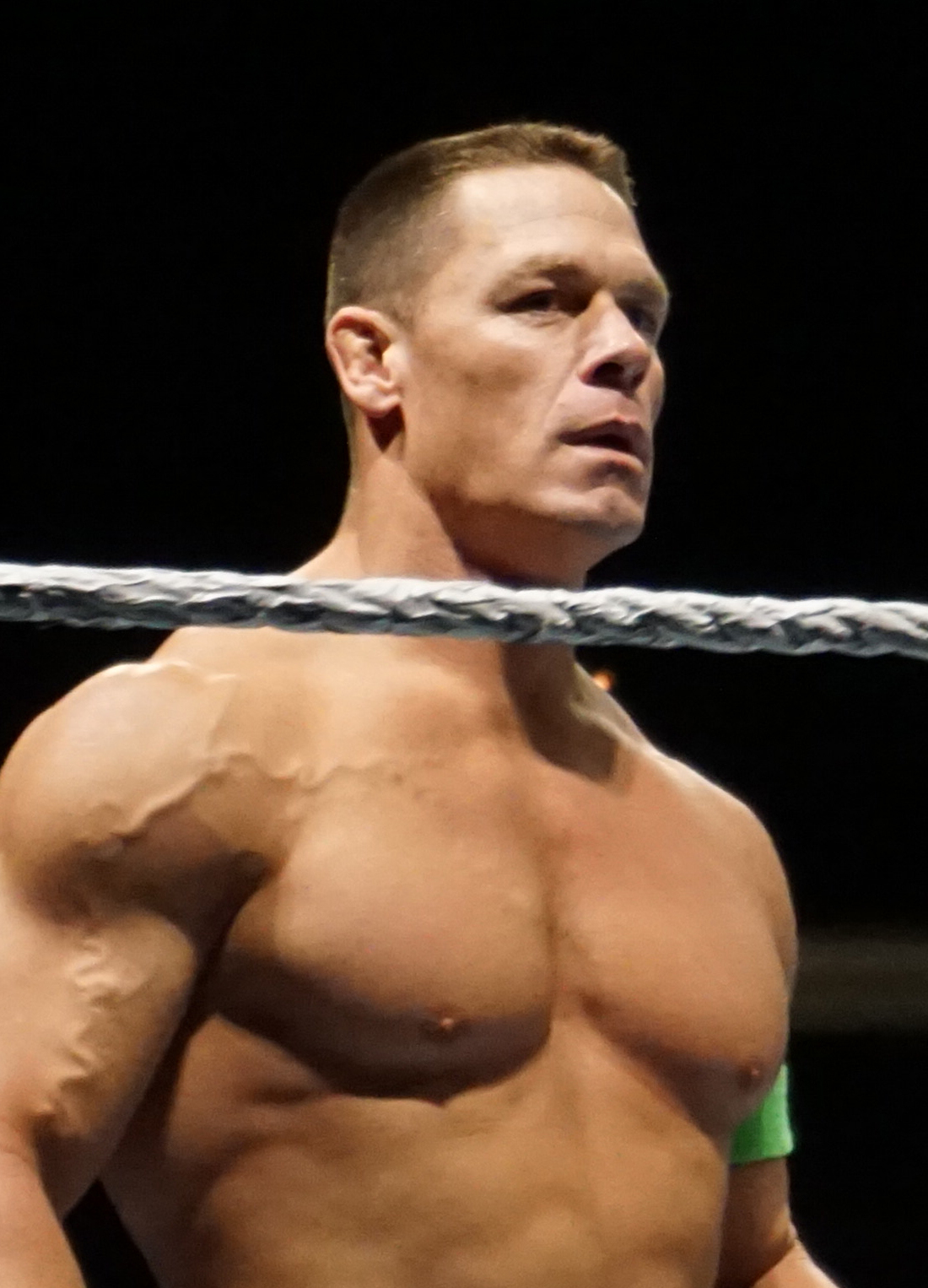
After being absent from WWE programming since WrestleMania 36 in April 2020, John Cena made his return to WWE at Money in the Bank, confronting SmackDown's Universal Champion Roman Reigns.

Instead of waiting until SmackDown, John Cena first appeared on Raw to explain his appearance at Money in the Bank. He stated that he wanted to put Reigns in his place and officially challenged Reigns for the Universal Championship at SummerSlam. On SmackDown, however, Reigns rejected Cena's challenge and instead accepted a challenge from Finn Bálor, who had returned to SmackDown the previous week. An altercation occurred during the contract signing the following week, which ultimately led to Cena signing the match contract, officially scheduling Reigns to defend the title against Cena at SummerSlam.

Also on the following episode of SmackDown, Edge claimed that he would have won the Universal Championship had it not been for Seth Rollins' actions. He stated that their issues date back to December 2014 when Rollins had attempted to injure Edge's surgically repaired neck and definitively put an end to his career. Rollins then came out and said he despised older wrestlers like Edge and John Cena for coming back and taking opportunities from the current wrestlers who earned them. A brawl then ensued with Edge performing the Edgecution on Rollins. As Edge attempted a Spear, Rollins retreated. On the August 6 episode, Edge challenged Rollins to a match at SummerSlam that Rollins accepted.

Big E cut a promo on winning the Money in the Bank briefcase and called it the biggest victory of his career, only for Intercontinental Champion Apollo Crews (accompanied by Commander Azeez) to interrupt and gloat about defeating Big E for the title back at WrestleMania 37. Dolph Ziggler and Robert Roode interrupted, followed by King Nakamura (accompanied by Rick Boogs) and Cesaro, all wanting to challenge Crews for the Intercontinental Championship. A brawl then ensued with Big E, Cesaro, and Nakamura taking out Crews, Azeez, Ziggler, and Roode. Big E then appeared on the September 13 episode of Raw and successfully cashed in his Money in the Bank contract on Bobby Lashley to win the WWE Championship, thus transferring to Raw in the process, and made Big E WWE's 33rd Triple Crown winner.

Also on SmackDown, Jimmy Uso defeated Dominik Mysterio in a singles match, thanks to Jey assisting Jimmy during the pin, similar to the pin during Money in the Bank Kickoff that won The Usos the SmackDown Tag Team Championship from Dominik and Rey Mysterio. The following week, Rey defeated Jimmy with that same pinning combination. On August 5, a championship rematch between the two teams was scheduled for SummerSlam. The Usos would continue to hold the SmackDown Tag Team Championship until WrestleMania 39 in 2023, where they were dethroned by Kevin Owens and Sami Zayn, reigning for 622 days.

== Results ==
No.	Results	Stipulations	Times
1^{P}	The Usos (Jey Uso and Jimmy Uso) defeated The Mysterios (Rey Mysterio and Dominik Mysterio) (c) by pinfall	Tag team match for the WWE SmackDown Tag Team Championship	11:25
2	Nikki A.S.H. defeated Alexa Bliss, Asuka, Liv Morgan, Naomi, Natalya, Tamina, and Zelina Vega by retrieving the briefcase	Money in the Bank ladder match for a women's championship match contract	15:45
3	AJ Styles and Omos (c) defeated The Viking Raiders (Erik and Ivar) by pinfall (Note: This match was moved from the July 12 episode of Raw in order to occupy the slot vacated by the cancellation of the "I Quit" match between SmackDown Women's Champion Bianca Belair and Bayley due to the latter sustaining an injury.)	Tag team match for the WWE Raw Tag Team Championship	12:55
4	Bobby Lashley (c) (with MVP) defeated Kofi Kingston by technical submission	Singles match for the WWE Championship	7:35
5	Charlotte Flair defeated Rhea Ripley (c) by submission	Singles match for the WWE Raw Women's Championship	16:50
6	Big E defeated Drew McIntyre, John Morrison, Kevin Owens, King Nakamura, Ricochet, Riddle, and Seth Rollins by retrieving the briefcase	Money in the Bank ladder match for a world championship match contract	17:40
7	Roman Reigns (c) (with Paul Heyman) defeated Edge by pinfall	Singles match for the WWE Universal Championship	33:10
(c) / – the champion(s) heading into the match; P / – the match was broadcast on the pre-show
