= The O.C. (professional wrestling) =

Professional wrestling stable

- The O.C. logo

Stable
- Leader: AJ Styles
- Members: Luke Gallows; Karl Anderson; Michin
- Name(s): The Club; The O.C.
- Billed from: Tokyo, Japan
- Debut: May 9, 2016
- Disbanded: September 1, 2024
- Years active: 2016; 2019–2020; 2022–2024

The O.C. originally known as The Club, was an American professional wrestling stable in WWE. The group was composed of leader AJ Styles, Luke Gallows, Karl Anderson and Michin. Their team name is derived from a previous catchphrase: "the official, the original, the only club that matters" due to Styles, Gallows, and Anderson being three former members of the Bullet Club.

Previously working in New Japan Pro-Wrestling as members of Bullet Club, the trio of Styles, Gallows and Anderson reunited in WWE in May 2016 as The Club, before splitting two months later. They would officially reunite in July 2019, having adopted The O.C. as their new name. The team split again in April 2020 when Gallows and Anderson were released from WWE but reformed upon their return to the company in October 2022 with Michin joining the group the next month.

== Background ==
From 2014 to 2016, AJ Styles, Luke Gallows (under the name Doc Gallows), and Karl Anderson were members of Bullet Club, primarily appearing in the Japanese promotion New Japan Pro-Wrestling (NJPW). In NJPW, Styles was a two-time IWGP Heavyweight Champion, and Gallows and Anderson were three-time IWGP Tag Team Champions. Styles departed from the promotion in January 2016, followed by Gallows and Anderson in February. After their departures, there were weeks of speculation and teasing from WWE themselves about the trio signing with WWE.

== History ==
=== Initial run as The Club (2016–2018) ===
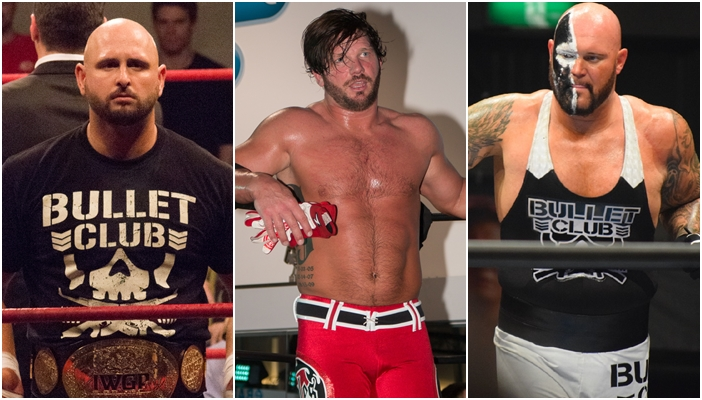
Male Members of The O.C. (left to right) Karl Anderson, AJ Styles (leader), and Luke Gallows

At the 2016 Royal Rumble, AJ Styles debuted for WWE in the Royal Rumble match. A few months later on the April 11, 2016, episode of Raw, Luke Gallows and Karl Anderson then made their WWE debut as a team, attacking The Usos (Jey Uso and Jimmy Uso), establishing themselves as heels in the process and with the duo's NJPW background being acknowledged by WWE announcers. On the following week's Raw, WWE began teasing an alliance between Gallows and Anderson and their former Bullet Club stablemate Styles when, after meeting Styles in a backstage interview, Gallows and Anderson attacked his Payback opponent Roman Reigns in the ring; Styles, however, did not seem pleased with the attack. Over the next few weeks, Gallows and Anderson continued teasing an uneasy alliance with Styles, while having several face offs with The Usos and Roman Reigns, including at Payback, where the two failed in their attempt to help Styles capture the WWE World Heavyweight Championship from Reigns. On the May 9 episode of Raw, the trio of Styles, Gallows, and Anderson was dubbed "The Club" (a reference to their former NJPW stable, Bullet Club). The Club disbanded two weeks later on Raw, when Styles stated that he wanted an amicable separation from Gallows and Anderson, blaming them and The Usos for his failure to win the WWE World Heavyweight Championship at the previous day's Extreme Rules. Though Styles stated that the three could remain "brothers", Gallows and Anderson refused and ended the friendship altogether. On the May 30 episode of Raw, Gallows and Anderson entered the WWE Tag Team Championship picture by attacking reigning champions The New Day (Big E, Kofi Kingston, and Xavier Woods), while later in the show, Styles turned on the returning John Cena and reunited with Gallows and Anderson. This set up a match between Styles and Cena at Money in the Bank on June 19, which Styles won after interference from The Club. On July 19, The Club was split up in the WWE draft, with Gallows and Anderson being drafted to the Raw brand and Styles to SmackDown, which resulted in them wrestling their last match together as a trio on July 24 at Battleground in a loss against Cena, Enzo Amore, and Big Cass.

Gallows and Anderson were both drafted to SmackDown in the 2018 Superstar Shake-up, where they made a one-off reunion with Styles on the April 24, 2018, episode of SmackDown Live as faces, in a losing effort to Shinsuke Nakamura, Aiden English, and Rusev. After an unsuccessful stint on the SmackDown brand, Gallows and Anderson returned to the Raw brand on April 29, 2019, losing to The Usos. At that point, they had not won a match on television since they defeated The Usos in May 2018. Throughout the following weeks, Styles frustratingly encouraged Gallows and Anderson to be the successful duo they once were.

=== Reformation as The O.C. (2019–2020) ===
On the July 1, 2019, episode of Raw, Gallows and Anderson encouraged Styles to be the guy he once was in NJPW. After Styles lost a United States Championship match to Ricochet, Gallows and Anderson helped Styles to beat up Ricochet, and reuniting The Club as heels. Two weeks later at Extreme Rules, Styles, accompanied by The Club, won his third United States Championship by defeating Ricochet. On the July 22 episode of Raw, The Club was renamed "The O.C." and repeatedly claimed that they were the "official, original, and only club that matters". The following week, Gallows and Anderson won their second Raw Tag Team Championship, making all members of The O.C. champions, but they lost the titles on the August 19 episode of Raw to Seth Rollins and Braun Strowman, ending their reign at 21 days. At Crown Jewel on October 31, Gallows and Anderson won the nine-team tag team turmoil match to win the WWE Tag Team World Cup and be called "the best tag team in the world". Styles also retained his U.S. title against Humberto Carrillo at the event.

The O.C. would have unfortunate luck at Survivor Series; during the Kickoff pre-show, Gallows and Anderson were eliminated from the interbrand tag team battle royal, and on the main show, Styles lost the interbrand triple threat match, in which he faced SmackDown's Intercontinental Champion Shinsuke Nakamura and NXT North American Champion Roderick Strong, where Strong stole the victory from Styles after Styles had performed a Phenomenal Forearm on Nakamura and Strong threw Styles out of the ring and pinned Nakamura. The O.C. would again have bad luck on the following night's Raw as during Styles' championship match against Rey Mysterio, Gallows and Anderson were ejected from ringside and Styles ultimately lost his U.S. title to Mysterio thanks to help from Randy Orton. All members of The O.C. would enter the 2020 Royal Rumble, with Styles entering at 18, Anderson at 20, and Gallows at 24, but they were all eliminated. At Super ShowDown in February, Gallows and Anderson took out Mysterio in an attempt to help Styles win the Tuwaiq Mountain Trophy Gauntlet match, but The Undertaker in turn took out Gallows and Anderson, and then took Mysterio's spot in the gauntlet match and defeated Styles to win the trophy, thus beginning a feud with Undertaker. Styles then faced Aleister Black at Elimination Chamber in a no disqualification match, but would lose after The Undertaker came out and took out Gallows and Anderson and chokeslammed Styles, allowing Black to hit Black Mass and win the match. Styles would then face The Undertaker in the main event of the first night of WrestleMania 36 in a Boneyard match, but would lose despite interference from Gallows and Anderson.

On April 15, 2020, the stable was dissolved when Gallows and Anderson were released from their WWE contracts as part of budget cuts stemming from the COVID-19 pandemic, while Styles formed a tag team with Omos a short time later.

=== Reunion and addition of Michin (2022–2024) ===
After a two year absence, Gallows and Anderson returned to WWE on the October 10, 2022, episode of Raw, reuniting The O.C. with Styles as faces. They attacked former Bullet Club leader Finn Bálor and his stable, The Judgment Day (including Damian Priest and Dominik Mysterio), as Bálor had issued Styles an ultimatum to join his group, whereby Styles refused and brought in Gallows and Anderson as his backup. The following week, a six-man tag team match between the stables was scheduled for Crown Jewel on November 5. At the event, The O.C. lost to The Judgment Day after interference from Rhea Ripley. On the November 7, episode of Raw, Michin, returning to WWE herself that night, aligned with The O.C. to counter Ripley. At Survivor Series WarGames on November 26, Styles defeated Bálor while Michin’s team defeated Ripley's team in a WarGames match. On the following episode of Raw, The O.C. was defeated by The Judgment Day in an eight-person mixed tag team match to end their feud. As part of the 2023 WWE Draft, The O.C. were drafted to the SmackDown brand, with Styles and Michin subsequently feuding briefly with Karrion Kross and Scarlett, with Styles and Kross trading victories in singles matches and the two sides facing off in tag team matches. The feud concluded on the August 11 episode of SmackDown, when Styles defeated Kross.

The O.C. would begin a feud with The Bloodline, with Styles losing to Solo Sikoa on the September 1 episode of SmackDown after interference from Jimmy Uso. John Cena would come to Styles' aid, setting up a tag team match between Cena and Styles against Uso and Sikoa for Fastlane. However, Styles was taken out by Sikoa backstage, removing him from the match; he was replaced by LA Knight. After a two-month hiatus, Styles returned on the December 15 episode of SmackDown and assisted Knight and Randy Orton in fending off The Bloodline. Styles took out Knight after The Bloodline was cleared from the ring. In the following week, Michin pinned WWE Women's Champion Iyo Sky in an eight-women tag team holiday street fight match against Damage CTRL, granting her a title shot at SmackDown: New Year's Revolution. Later that night, The O.C. greeted Styles, but he blew them off for not coming to his aid when he was attacked by The Bloodline, thus leaving the group. At SmackDown: New Year's Revolution on January 5, 2024, Michin failed to win the title from Sky.

On the February 20, 2024 episode of NXT, Gallows and Anderson attacked Axiom and Nathan Frazer and Chase University (Andre Chase and Duke Hudson) after the two teams faced each other, marking Gallows and Anderson's return to NXT. On the February 27 episode of NXT, Gallows and Anderson defeated Edris Enofe and Malik Blade in their first match back in NXT. Gallows and Anderson entered a tournament for an NXT Tag Team Championship match at Stand and Deliver, which was won by Axiom and Nathan Frazer. Michin would also return to NXT on April 30. On the May 28 episode of NXT, Michin defeated Tatum Paxley to qualify for the ladder match to crown the inaugural NXT Women's North American Championship at Battleground. Later that night, NXT General Manager Ava announced Gallows and Anderson will face Axiom and Frazer for the titles at the event.

=== Disbandment ===
On the May 31, 2024 episode of SmackDown, Styles seemingly delivered a retirement speech, which was revealed to be a ruse after he attacked Undisputed WWE Champion Cody Rhodes as Gallows and Anderson stopped security from intervening. This led to an "I quit" match between Styles and Rhodes being announced for Clash at the Castle: Scotland. At the event, Styles failed to win the Undisputed WWE Championship from Rhodes after saying "I quit!" into the microphone. After that, Styles took time off television, leading to the start of the dissension of the stable. 3 months later, on September 1, 2024, Michin confirmed that the stable had disbanded.

== Members ==
*	Founding member(s)
L	Leader

Member	Joined	Left
AJ Styles (L)	May 9, 2016*	September 1, 2024
Luke Gallows	May 9, 2016*	September 1, 2024
Karl Anderson	May 9, 2016*	September 1, 2024
Michin	November 7, 2022	September 1, 2024

== Sub-groups ==
Affiliate	Members	Tenure	Type
The Good Brothers	Luke Gallows; Karl Anderson	2016; 2018; 2019–2020; 2022–2024	Tag team

== Championships and accomplishments ==
- WWE
  - WWE Championship (1 time) – Styles
  - WWE United States Championship (1 time) – Styles
  - WWE Raw Tag Team Championship (2 times) – Gallows and Anderson
  - WWE Tag Team World Cup (2019) – Gallows and Anderson
