= List of World Tag Team Champions (WWE) =

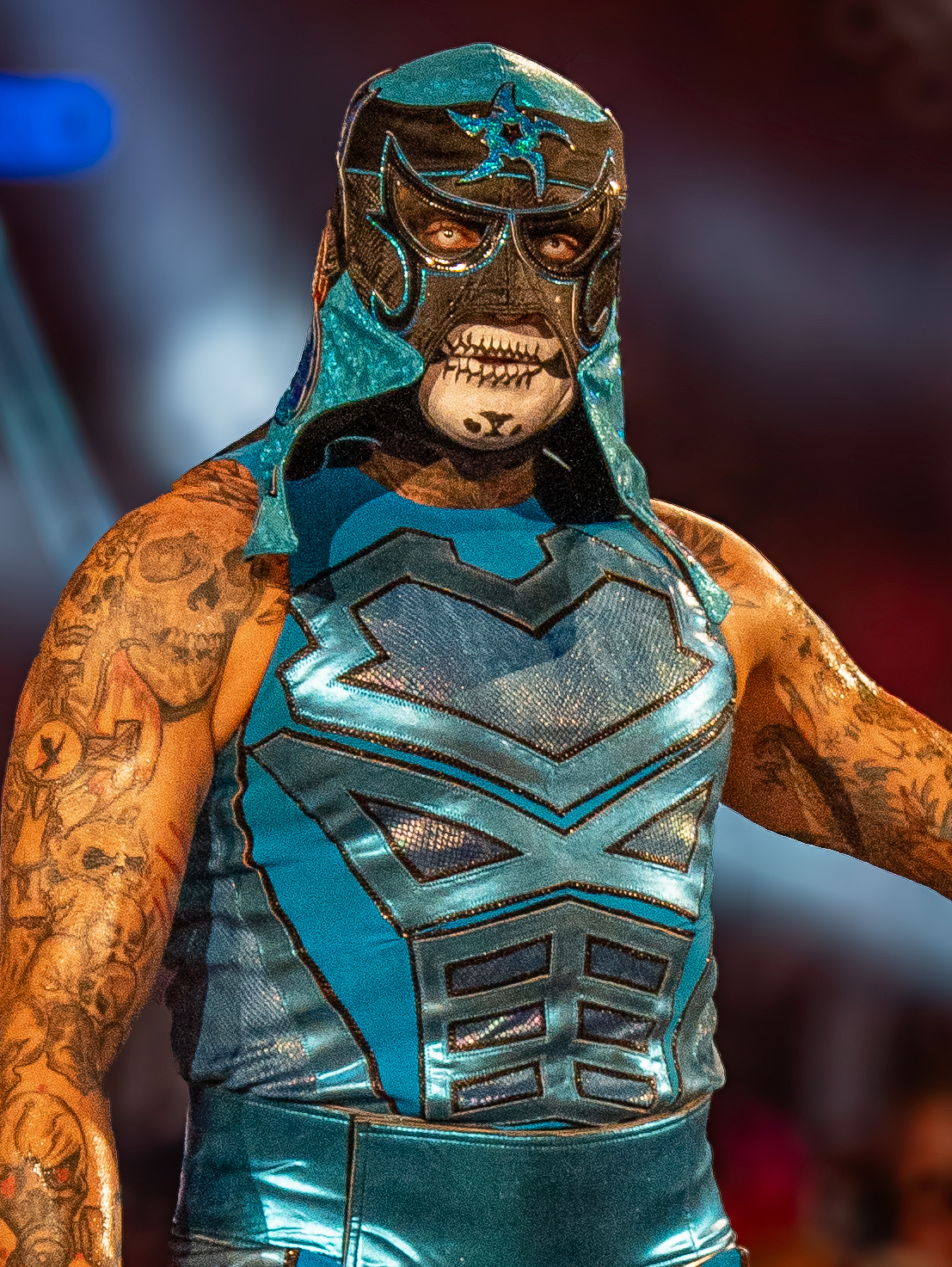
Current champions Penta and Je'Von Evans

The World Tag Team Championship is a men's professional wrestling world tag team championship contested in WWE on the Raw brand. Introduced as the WWE Tag Team Championship, it was WWE's third world tag team title, and sixth tag team title overall. After WWE bought the promotions of Extreme Championship Wrestling (ECW) and World Championship Wrestling (WCW), and unified the WCW Tag Team Championship into its own title at Survivor Series 2001, it split its roster into two brands, Raw and SmackDown. As WWE's original World Tag Team Championship was designated exclusive to the Raw brand, SmackDown introduced the WWE Tag Team Championship as its own championship.

In 2007, after the initiation of the ECW brand, the title was shared between the SmackDown and ECW brands, thus inter-brand matches could take place for the title. In 2009, the title was unified with the original World Tag Team Championship by The Colóns (Carlito and Primo) at WrestleMania XXV and became recognized as the "Unified WWE Tag Team Championship" until August 2010 when the World Tag Team Championship was decommissioned in favor of continuing the lineage of the WWE Tag Team Championship.

In 2016, WWE reintroduced its brand split and the championship became exclusive to Raw. It was subsequently renamed to Raw Tag Team Championship after SmackDown introduced the SmackDown Tag Team Championship. From May 2022 to April 2024, both the Raw and SmackDown titles were held and defended together as the Undisputed WWE Tag Team Championship while maintaining their individual lineages. They were split at WrestleMania XL in April 2024 and the Raw championship was subsequently renamed as the World Tag Team Championship.

The championship is generally contested in professional wrestling matches, in which participants execute scripted finishes rather than contend in direct competition. The inaugural champions were Kurt Angle and Chris Benoit, who won the title in a tournament final at No Mercy on October 20, 2002. Penta and Je'Von Evans are the current champions in their first reign, both as a team and individually. They won the title by defeating The Vision (Bron Breakker and Austin Theory) at Crown Jewel on November 7, 2026, in Riyadh, Saudi Arabia.

As of November 21, 2026, there have been 103 reigns between 75 teams composed of 109 individual champions and one vacancy. The New Day (Kofi Kingston and Xavier Woods) have the most reigns as a team at five, while individually, Kingston has the most with seven. The New Day's second reign is also the longest reign at 483 days and they are the only team to hold the championship for over one consecutive year—Big E is also credited for this reign as during New Day's first two reigns, Big E, Kingston, and Woods were all recognized as champion under the Freebird Rule (Big E was split from the team in the 2020 WWE Draft). John Cena and The Miz's sole reign as a team is the shortest reign at 9 minutes, due to The Corre invoking their rematch clause immediately after losing the title. As a team, The New Day (across its variants of team members) also have the longest combined reign at 699 days, while Kingston individually has the longest combined reign at 984 days (982 days as recognized by WWE). Je'Von Evans is the youngest champion at 22 years old (also making him the youngest champion in WWE history), while R-Truth is the oldest champion at age 52.

== Title history ==
=== Names ===
Name	Years
WWE Tag Team Championship	October 20, 2002 – September 5, 2016
Unified WWE Tag Team Championship (Note: In tandem with the original World Tag Team Championship.)	April 5, 2009 – August 16, 2010
WWE Raw Tag Team Championship	September 5, 2016 – April 15, 2024
Undisputed WWE Tag Team Championship (Note: In tandem with the then-WWE SmackDown Tag Team Championship.)	May 20, 2022 – April 6, 2024
World Tag Team Championship	April 15, 2024 – present

=== Reigns ===
As of November 21, 2026.

Key
No.	Overall reign number
Reign	Reign number for the specific team—reign numbers for the individuals are in parentheses, if different
Days	Number of days held
Days recog.	Number of days held recognized by the promotion
<1	Reign lasted less than a day
+	Current reign is changing daily

No.	Champion	Championship change			Reign statistics			Notes	Ref.
No.	Champion	Date	Event	Location	Reign	Days	Days recog.	Notes	Ref.
WWE: SmackDown
1	Chris Benoit and Kurt Angle	October 20, 2002	No Mercy	North Little Rock, AR	1	16	17	The title was introduced as the WWE Tag Team Championship for the SmackDown brand after the original World Tag Team Championship became exclusive to Raw after the brand split was established. Angle and Benoit defeated Edge and Rey Mysterio in the tournament final to become the inaugural champions. WWE recognizes their reign as ending on November 7, 2002, when the following episode aired on tape delay.	
2	Edge and Rey Mysterio	November 5, 2002	SmackDown!	Manchester, NH	1	12	9	This was a two out of three falls match. WWE recognizes their reign as beginning on November 7, 2002, when the episode aired on tape delay.	
3	Los Guerreros (Chavo Guerrero and Eddie Guerrero)	November 17, 2002	Survivor Series	New York, NY	1	79	80	This was a triple threat tag team elimination match, also involving Kurt Angle and Chris Benoit. WWE recognizes their reign as ending on February 6, 2003, when the following episode aired on tape delay.	
4	Team Angle (Charlie Haas and Shelton Benjamin)	February 4, 2003	SmackDown!	Philadelphia, PA	1	103	100	WWE recognizes their reign as beginning on February 6, 2003, when the episode aired on tape delay.	
5	Eddie Guerrero and Tajiri	May 18, 2003	Judgment Day	Charlotte, NC	1 (2, 1)	44	45	This was a ladder match. Los Guerreros (Chavo Guerrero and Eddie Guerrero) had invoked their rematch clause, but Chavo got injured prior to the match and was replaced by Tajiri. WWE recognizes their reign as ending on July 3, 2003, when the following episode aired on tape delay.	
6	The World's Greatest Tag Team (Charlie Haas and Shelton Benjamin)	July 1, 2003	SmackDown!	Rochester, NY	2	77	76	Previously known as Team Angle. WWE recognizes their reign as beginning on July 3, 2003, and ending on September 18, 2003, both episodes of which aired on tape delay.	
7	Los Guerreros (Chavo Guerrero and Eddie Guerrero)	September 16, 2003	SmackDown!	Raleigh, NC	2 (2, 3)	35	34	WWE recognizes their reign as beginning on September 18, 2003, and ending on October 23, 2003, both episodes of which aired on tape delay.	
8	Basham Brothers (Danny Basham and Doug Basham)	October 21, 2003	SmackDown!	Albany, NY	1	105	104	WWE recognizes their reign as beginning on October 23, 2003, and ending on February 5, 2004, both episodes of which aired on tape delay.	
9	Too Cool (Rikishi and Scotty 2 Hotty)	February 3, 2004	SmackDown!	Cleveland, OH	1	77	76	WWE recognizes their reign as beginning on February 5, 2004, and ending on April 22, 2004, both episodes of which aired on tape delay.	
10	Charlie Haas and Rico	April 20, 2004	SmackDown!	Kelowna, BC, Canada	1 (3, 1)	56	55	WWE recognizes their reign as beginning on April 22, 2004, and ending on June 17, 2004, both episodes of which aired on tape delay.	
11	Dudley Boyz (Bubba Ray Dudley and D-Von Dudley)	June 15, 2004	SmackDown!	Rosemont, IL	1	21	20	WWE recognizes their reign as beginning on June 17, 2004, and ending on July 8, 2004, both episodes of which aired on tape delay.	
12	Billy Kidman and Paul London	July 6, 2004	SmackDown!	Winnipeg, MB, Canada	1	63	62	WWE recognizes their reign as beginning on July 8, 2004, and ending on September 9, 2004, both episodes of which aired on tape delay.	
13	Kenzo Suzuki and René Duprée	September 7, 2004	SmackDown!	Tulsa, OK	1	91	90	WWE recognizes their reign as beginning on September 9, 2004, and ending on December 9, 2004, both episodes of which aired on tape delay.	
14	Rey Mysterio and Rob Van Dam	December 7, 2004	SmackDown!	Greenville, SC	1 (2, 1)	35	34	WWE recognizes their reign as beginning on December 9, 2004, and ending on January 13, 2005, both episodes of which aired on tape delay.	
15	Basham Brothers (Danny Basham and Doug Basham)	January 11, 2005	SmackDown!	Tampa, FL	2	40	37	This was a fatal four-way tag team elimination match, also involving Mark Jindrak & Luther Reigns and Booker T & Eddie Guerrero. WWE recognizes their reign as beginning on January 13, 2005, when the episode aired on tape delay.	
16	Eddie Guerrero and Rey Mysterio	February 20, 2005	No Way Out	Pittsburgh, PA	1 (4, 3)	57	59	WWE recognizes their reign as ending on April 21, 2005, when the following episode aired on tape delay.	
17	MNM (Joey Mercury and Johnny Nitro)	April 19, 2005	SmackDown!	New York, NY	1	96	94	WWE recognizes their reign as beginning on April 21, 2005, when the episode aired on tape delay, and ending on July 24, 2005.	
18	Legion of Doom (Animal and Heidenreich)	July 24, 2005	The Great American Bash	Buffalo, NY	1	93	93	WWE recognizes their reign as beginning on July 24, 2005, and ending on October 25, 2005, when the following episode aired on tape delay.	
19	MNM (Joey Mercury and Johnny Nitro)	October 25, 2005	SmackDown!	Daly City, CA	2	49	52	This was a fatal four-way tag team match, also involving The Mexicools (represented by Super Crazy and Psicosis) and Paul Burchill and William Regal. WWE recognizes their reign as beginning on October 25, 2005, and ending on December 16, 2005, both episodes of which aired on tape delay.	
20	Batista and Rey Mysterio	December 13, 2005	SmackDown!	Springfield, MA	1 (1, 4)	14	13	WWE recognizes their reign as beginning on December 16, 2005, and ending on December 29, 2005, both episodes of which aired on tape delay.	
21	MNM (Joey Mercury and Johnny Nitro)	December 27, 2005	SmackDown!	Uncasville, CT	3	145	142	WWE recognizes their reign as beginning on December 29, 2005, when the episode aired on tape delay.	
22	Paul London and Brian Kendrick	May 21, 2006	Judgment Day	Phoenix, AZ	1 (2,1)	331	333	WWE recognizes their reign as ending on April 20, 2007, when the following episode aired on tape delay.	
23	Deuce 'n Domino	April 17, 2007	SmackDown!	Milan, Italy	1	133	132	WWE recognizes their reign as beginning on April 20, 2007, and ending on August 31, 2007, both episodes of which aired on tape delay.	
24	Matt Hardy and Montel Vontavious Porter	August 28, 2007	SmackDown!	Albany, NY	1	77	76	WWE recognizes their reign as beginning on August 31, 2007, and ending on November 16, 2007, both episodes of which aired on tape delay.	
WWE: ECW
25	John Morrison and The Miz	November 13, 2007	SmackDown!	Wichita, KS	1 (4, 1)	250	246	The title was shared with the ECW brand after SmackDown and ECW began a talent exchange agreement. WWE recognizes their reign as beginning on November 16, 2007, when the episode aired on tape delay. John Morrison was formerly known as Johnny Nitro.	
WWE: SmackDown
26	Curt Hawkins and Zack Ryder	July 20, 2008	The Great American Bash	Uniondale, NY	1	63	67	This was a fatal four-way tag team match, also involving Finlay and Hornswoggle and Jesse and Festus and who Hawkins and Ryder pinned. WWE recognizes their reign as ending on September 26, 2008, when the following episode aired on tape delay.	
27	The Colóns (Carlito and Primo)	September 21, 2008	SmackDown	Columbus, OH	1	280	274	On April 5, 2009, at WrestleMania XXV, The Colóns unified the WWE Tag Team Championship with the original World Tag Team Championship. The titles remained independently active, but were collectively defended on any brand as the Unified WWE Tag Team Championship. WWE recognizes their reign as beginning on September 26, 2008, when the episode aired on tape delay.	
WWE: Raw, SmackDown, and ECW
28	Chris Jericho and Edge	June 28, 2009	The Bash	Sacramento, CA	1 (1, 2)	28	27	This was a triple threat tag team match, also involving The Legacy (represented by Cody Rhodes and Ted DiBiase).	
29	Jeri-Show (Big Show and Chris Jericho)	July 26, 2009	Night of Champions	Philadelphia, PA	1 (1, 2)	140	139	Shortly after Edge and Chris Jericho won the title, Edge suffered a torn Achilles tendon, which required surgery and forced him to vacate his half of the championship. Jericho was allowed to keep his title and choose a new partner; he chose Big Show at Night of Champions. WWE recognizes this as a second reign for Jericho.	
30	D-Generation X (Shawn Michaels and Triple H)	December 13, 2009	TLC: Tables, Ladders & Chairs	San Antonio, TX	1	57	56	This was a Tables, Ladders, and Chairs match.	
31	ShoMiz (Big Show and The Miz)	February 8, 2010	Raw	Lafayette, LA	1 (2, 2)	77	76	This was a triple threat tag team elimination match, also involving The Straight Edge Society (CM Punk and Luke Gallows).	
WWE: Raw and SmackDown
32	The Hart Dynasty (David Hart Smith and Tyson Kidd)	April 26, 2010	Raw	Richmond, VA	1	146	145	The original World Tag Team Championship was deactivated during their reign on August 16, 2010. "Unified" was dropped from the name, but the WWE Tag Team Championship continued to be defended on any brand.	
33	Cody Rhodes and Drew McIntyre	September 19, 2010	Night of Champions	Rosemont, IL	1	35	34	This was a Tag Team Turmoil match, also involving The Usos (Jey Uso and Jimmy Uso), Santino Marella and Vladimir Kozlov, and Evan Bourne and Mark Henry.	
34	The Nexus (David Otunga and John Cena)	October 24, 2010	Bragging Rights	Minneapolis, MN	1	1	<1		
35	The Nexus (Heath Slater and Justin Gabriel)	October 25, 2010	Raw	Green Bay, WI	1	42	41	Wade Barrett kept the title within Nexus, but took out John Cena by ordering David Otunga to lie down purposely for a pinfall.	
36	Santino Marella and Vladimir Kozlov	December 6, 2010	Raw	Louisville, KY	1	76	75	This was a fatal four-way tag team elimination match, also involving Mark Henry and Yoshi Tatsu and The Usos (Jey Uso and Jimmy Uso).	
37	The Corre (Heath Slater and Justin Gabriel)	February 20, 2011	Elimination Chamber	Oakland, CA	2	1	<1		
38	John Cena and The Miz	February 21, 2011	Raw	Fresno, CA	1 (2, 3)	<1	<1		
39	The Corre (Heath Slater and Justin Gabriel)	February 21, 2011	Raw	Fresno, CA	3	57	59	WWE recognizes their reign as ending on April 22, 2011, when the following episode aired on tape delay.	
40	Big Show and Kane	April 19, 2011	SmackDown	London, England	1 (3, 1)	34	30	WWE recognizes their reign as beginning on April 22, 2011, when the episode aired on tape delay.	
41	The New Nexus (David Otunga and Michael McGillicutty)	May 23, 2011	Raw	Portland, OR	1 (2, 1)	91	90	Otunga and McGillicutty won the title under the name of The New Nexus, but the stable disbanded during their reign.	
42	Air Boom (Evan Bourne and Kofi Kingston)	August 22, 2011	Raw	Edmonton, AB, Canada	1	146	145	On August 29, 2011, the brand extension ended. On November 1, 2011, WWE suspended Bourne for 30 days.	
WWE (unbranded)
43	Primo and Epico	January 15, 2012	House show	Oakland, CA	1 (2, 1)	106	106		
44	Kofi Kingston and R-Truth	April 30, 2012	Raw	Dayton, OH	1 (2, 1)	139	138		
45	Team Hell No (Daniel Bryan and Kane)	September 16, 2012	Night of Champions	Boston, MA	1 (1, 2)	245	245		
46	The Shield (Roman Reigns and Seth Rollins)	May 19, 2013	Extreme Rules	St. Louis, MO	1	148	148	This was a Tornado Tag Team match.	
47	Cody Rhodes and Goldust	October 14, 2013	Raw	St. Louis, MO	1 (2, 1)	104	103	This was a No Disqualification match.	
48	The New Age Outlaws (Billy Gunn and Road Dogg)	January 26, 2014	Royal Rumble; Kickoff	Pittsburgh, PA	1	36	36		
49	The Usos (Jey Uso and Jimmy Uso)	March 3, 2014	Raw	Rosemont, IL	1	202	201		
50	Goldust and Stardust	September 21, 2014	Night of Champions	Nashville, TN	2 (2, 3)	63	63	Stardust was formerly known as Cody Rhodes.	
51	Damien Mizdow and The Miz	November 23, 2014	Survivor Series	St. Louis, MO	1 (1, 4)	36	36	This was a fatal four-way tag team match, also involving Los Matadores (Diego and Fernando) and The Usos (Jey Uso and Jimmy Uso).	
52	The Usos (Jey Uso and Jimmy Uso)	December 29, 2014	Raw	Washington, D.C.	2	55	55		
53	Cesaro and Tyson Kidd	February 22, 2015	Fastlane	Memphis, TN	1 (1, 2)	63	62		
54	The New Day (Big E, Kofi Kingston, and Xavier Woods)	April 26, 2015	Extreme Rules	Rosemont, IL	1 (1, 3, 1)	49	49	Big E and Kingston won the match, but Woods was also recognized as champion under the Freebird Rule.	
55	The Prime Time Players (Darren Young and Titus O'Neil)	June 14, 2015	Money in the Bank	Columbus, OH	1	70	69	Big E and Xavier Woods represented The New Day.	
56	The New Day (Big E, Kofi Kingston, and Xavier Woods)	August 23, 2015	SummerSlam	Brooklyn, NY	2 (2, 4, 2)	483	483	This was a fatal four-way tag team match, also involving Lucha Dragons (Kalisto and Sin Cara) and Los Matadores (Diego and Fernando) who New Day pinned. Big E and Kingston won the match, but Woods was also recognized as champion under the Freebird Rule. The brand extension returned and the title became exclusive to the Raw brand following the 2016 WWE draft. The title was renamed as Raw Tag Team Championship on September 5, 2016, following the creation of the SmackDown Tag Team Championship.	
WWE: Raw
57	Cesaro and Sheamus	December 18, 2016	Roadblock: End of the Line	Pittsburgh, PA	1 (2, 1)	42	41	Big E and Kofi Kingston represented The New Day.	
58	Luke Gallows and Karl Anderson	January 29, 2017	Royal Rumble; Kickoff	San Antonio, TX	1	63	63	Two referees were assigned to the match.	
59	The Hardy Boyz (Jeff Hardy and Matt Hardy)	April 2, 2017	WrestleMania 33	Orlando, FL	1 (1, 2)	63	63	Luke Gallows and Karl Anderson were originally scheduled to defend the title in a triple threat ladder match against Enzo Amore and Big Cass and Cesaro and Sheamus. Prior to the match, however, event hosts The New Day (Big E, Kofi Kingston, and Xavier Woods) announced that the match would be a fatal four-way ladder match with the returning Hardy Boyz.	
60	Cesaro and Sheamus	June 4, 2017	Extreme Rules	Baltimore, MD	2 (3, 2)	77	76	This was a Steel Cage match.	
61	Dean Ambrose and Seth Rollins	August 20, 2017	SummerSlam	Brooklyn, NY	1 (1, 2)	78	78		
62	Cesaro and Sheamus	November 6, 2017	Raw	Manchester, England	3 (4, 3)	49	49		
63	Jason Jordan and Seth Rollins	December 25, 2017	Raw	Rosemont, IL	1 (1, 3)	34	33		
64	Cesaro and Sheamus	January 28, 2018	Royal Rumble	Philadelphia, PA	4 (5, 4)	70	70		
65	Braun Strowman and Nicholas	April 8, 2018	WrestleMania 34	New Orleans, LA	1	1	<1	Strowman was obligated to find a partner for the match and chose Nicholas, a 10-year old boy from the live audience.	
—	Vacated	April 9, 2018	Raw	New Orleans, LA	—	—	—	Braun Strowman and Nicholas voluntarily relinquished the title due to "scheduling conflicts" with Nicholas being a fourth-grader and needing to attend school.	
66	Bray Wyatt and Matt Hardy	April 27, 2018	Greatest Royal Rumble	Jeddah, Saudi Arabia	1 (1, 3)	79	79	Defeated Cesaro and Sheamus to win the vacant title.	
67	The B-Team (Bo Dallas and Curtis Axel)	July 15, 2018	Extreme Rules	Pittsburgh, PA	1 (1, 2)	50	50	Curtis Axel was formerly known as Michael McGillicutty.	
68	Dolph Ziggler and Drew McIntyre	September 3, 2018	Raw	Columbus, OH	1 (1, 2)	49	49		
69	Dean Ambrose and Seth Rollins	October 22, 2018	Raw	Providence, RI	2 (2, 4)	14	14	Immediately after they won the title, Ambrose turned on Rollins, leaving Rollins to defend the title alone.	
70	AOP (Akam and Rezar)	November 5, 2018	Raw	Manchester, England	1	35	34	Defeated Seth Rollins in a 2-on-1 handicap match.	
71	Bobby Roode and Chad Gable	December 10, 2018	Raw	San Diego, CA	1	63	63	This was a 2-on-3 handicap match also involving AOP's manager, Drake Maverick. Roode pinned Maverick to win AOP's title.	
72	The Revival (Dash Wilder and Scott Dawson)	February 11, 2019	Raw	Grand Rapids, MI	1	55	54		
73	Curt Hawkins and Zack Ryder	April 7, 2019	WrestleMania 35; Kickoff	East Rutherford, NJ	2	64	64		
74	The Revival (Dash Wilder and Scott Dawson)	June 10, 2019	Raw	San Jose, CA	2	49	48	This was a triple threat tag team match, also involving The Usos (Jey Uso and Jimmy Uso).	
75	The O.C. (Luke Gallows and Karl Anderson)	July 29, 2019	Raw	North Little Rock, AR	2	21	21	Gallows and Anderson's first reign was not as The O.C. This was a triple threat tag team match, also involving The Usos (Jey Uso and Jimmy Uso), who O.C. pinned.	
76	Braun Strowman and Seth Rollins	August 19, 2019	Raw	St. Paul, MN	1 (2, 5)	27	26		
77	Dolph Ziggler and Robert Roode	September 15, 2019	Clash of Champions	Charlotte, NC	1 (2, 2)	29	29	Robert Roode was formerly known as Bobby Roode.	
78	The Viking Raiders (Erik and Ivar)	October 14, 2019	Raw	Denver, CO	1	98	98		
79	Buddy Murphy and Seth Rollins	January 20, 2020	Raw	Wichita, KS	1 (1, 6)	42	41	Buddy Murphy's name was shortened to Murphy on February 7, 2020.	
80	The Street Profits (Montez Ford and Angelo Dawkins)	March 2, 2020	Raw	Brooklyn, NY	1	224	223	This was a Last Chance match.	
81	The New Day (Kofi Kingston and Xavier Woods)	October 12, 2020	Raw	Orlando, FL	3 (5, 3)	69	69	As a result of the 2020 WWE Draft, then-SmackDown Tag Team Champions The New Day were drafted to Raw while The Street Profits (Montez Ford and Angelo Dawkins) were drafted to SmackDown. To keep the branded championships on their respective brands, WWE official Adam Pearce had the two teams trade championships. Also as a result of the 2020 draft, Big E was split from The New Day; the three previously all reigned as champion under the Freebird Rule.	
82	The Hurt Business (Cedric Alexander and Shelton Benjamin)	December 20, 2020	TLC: Tables, Ladders & Chairs	St. Petersburg, FL	1 (1, 3)	85	84		
83	The New Day (Kofi Kingston and Xavier Woods)	March 15, 2021	Raw	St. Petersburg, FL	4 (6, 4)	26	26		
84	AJ Styles and Omos	April 10, 2021	WrestleMania 37; Night 1	Tampa, FL	1	133	132		
85	RK-Bro (Randy Orton and Riddle)	August 21, 2021	SummerSlam	Paradise, NV	1	142	142		
86	Alpha Academy (Chad Gable and Otis)	January 10, 2022	Raw	Philadelphia, PA	1 (2, 1)	56	56		
87	RK-Bro (Randy Orton and Riddle)	March 7, 2022	Raw	Cleveland, OH	2	74	74	This was a triple threat tag team match, also involving Seth "Freakin" Rollins and Kevin Owens.	
88	The Usos (Jey Uso and Jimmy Uso)	May 20, 2022	SmackDown	Grand Rapids, MI	3	316	316	This was a Winners Take All match in which The Usos defended the SmackDown Tag Team Championship, subsequently becoming recognized as the Undisputed WWE Tag Team Champions. During this reign in January 2023, Sami Zayn also defended the title once in Jimmy's place but was not recognized as champion. WWE's official title history mistakenly lists their reign as ending on April 2, 2023.	
WWE: Raw and SmackDown
89	Kevin Owens and Sami Zayn	April 1, 2023	WrestleMania 39; Night 1	Inglewood, CA	1	154	153	This match was also for The Usos' (Jey Uso and Jimmy Uso) SmackDown Tag Team Championship. WWE's official title history mistakenly lists their reign as beginning on April 2, 2023.	
90	The Judgment Day (Damian Priest and Finn Bálor)	September 2, 2023	Payback	Pittsburgh, PA	1	35	35	This was a Steel City Street Fight that was also for Kevin Owens and Sami Zayn's SmackDown Tag Team Championship.	
91	Cody Rhodes and Jey Uso	October 7, 2023	Fastlane	Indianapolis, IN	1 (4, 4)	9	9	This match was also for The Judgment Day's (Finn Bálor and Damian Priest) SmackDown Tag Team Championship.	
92	The Judgment Day (Damian Priest and Finn Bálor)	October 16, 2023	Raw	Oklahoma City, OK	2	173	172	This match was also for Cody Rhodes and Jey Uso's SmackDown Tag Team Championship.	
WWE: Raw
93	Awesome Truth (The Miz and R-Truth)	April 6, 2024	WrestleMania XL; Night 1	Philadelphia, PA	1 (5, 2)	79	79	This was a Six-Pack Tag Team Ladder match that was also for the SmackDown Tag Team Championship and involving A-Town Down Under (Austin Theory and Grayson Waller), #DIY (Johnny Gargano and Tommaso Ciampa), The New Day (Kofi Kingston and Xavier Woods), and New Catch Republic (Pete Dunne and Tyler Bate). Both titles were contested separately. On the April 15, 2024, episode of Raw, the title was renamed to World Tag Team Championship.	
94	The Judgment Day (Finn Bálor and JD McDonagh)	June 24, 2024	Raw	Indianapolis, IN	1 (3, 1)	175	175		
95	War Raiders (Erik and Ivar)	December 16, 2024	Raw	Boston, MA	2	124	123	Previously known as The Viking Raiders. All other members of The Judgment Day were banned from ringside.	
96	The New Day (Kofi Kingston and Xavier Woods)	April 19, 2025	WrestleMania 41; Night 1	Paradise, NV	5 (7, 5)	72	71		
97	The Judgment Day (Finn Bálor and JD McDonagh)	June 30, 2025	Raw	Pittsburgh, PA	2 (4, 2)	112	112		
98	AJ Styles and Dragon Lee	October 20, 2025	Raw	Sacramento, CA	1 (2, 1)	70	70		
99	The Usos (Jey Uso and Jimmy Uso)	December 29, 2025	Raw	Orlando, FL	4 (5, 4)	91	90		
100	The Vision (Austin Theory and Logan Paul/Bron Breakker)	March 30, 2026	Raw	New York, NY	1	84	83	This was a Street Fight. 56 days later, Breakker replaced Paul as champion on May 25 after Paul suffered an injury.	
101	The Street Profits (Montez Ford and Angelo Dawkins)	June 22, 2026	Raw	London, England	2	14	14	Before The Street Profits won the titles they were members of the SmackDown brand and were officially transferred to Raw after the title win.	
102	The Vision (Bron Breakker and Austin Theory)	July 6, 2026	Raw	Rosemont, IL	2	124	123		
103	Penta and Je'Von Evans	November 7, 2026	Crown Jewel	Riyadh, Saudi Arabia	1	14+	14+		

== Combined reigns ==
As of November 21, 2026.

=== By team ===
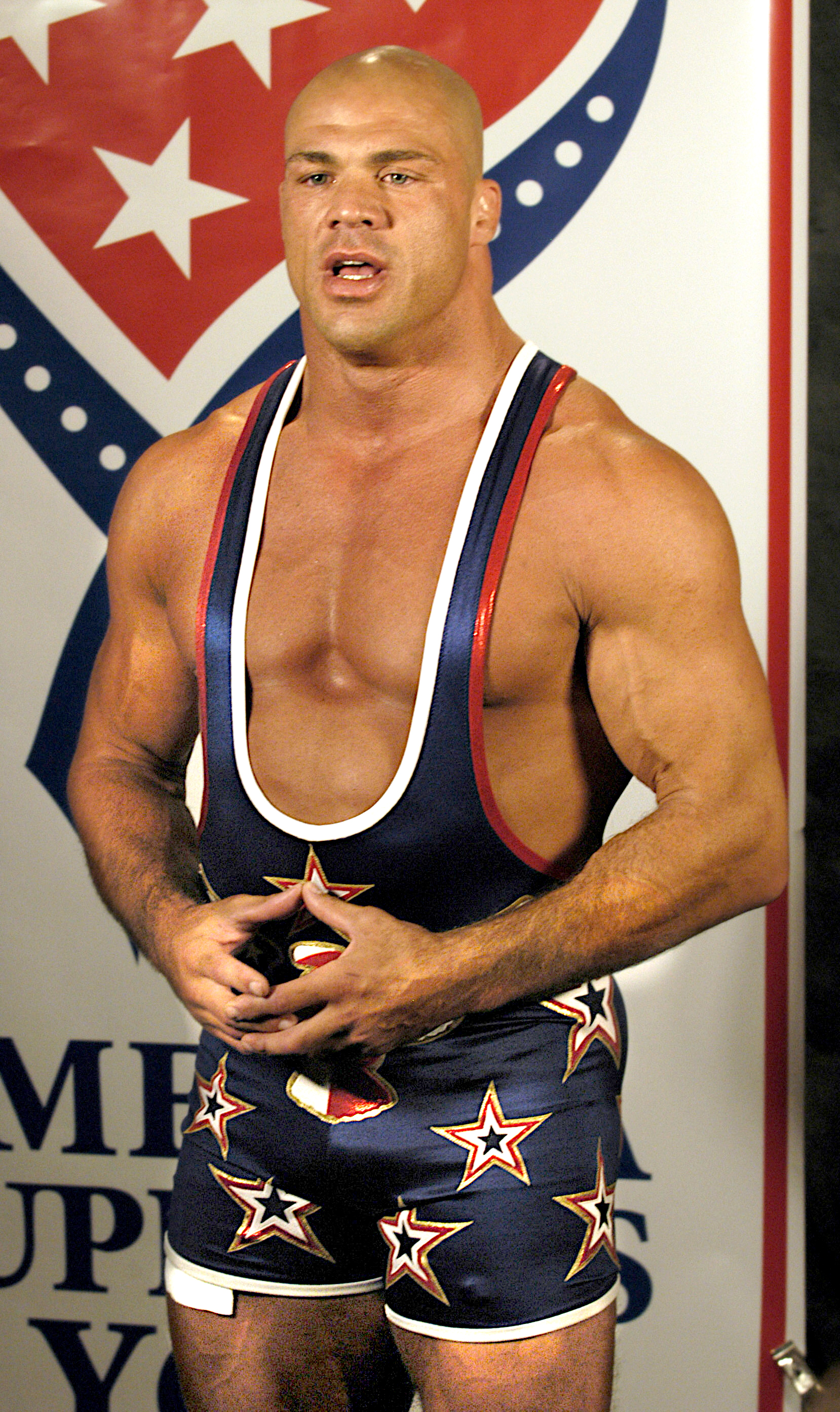
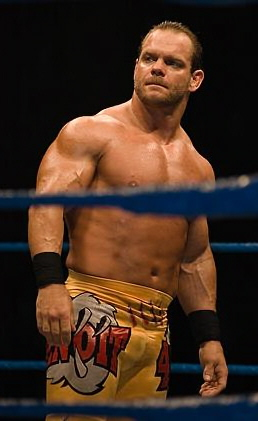
Inaugural champions Kurt Angle (left) and Chris Benoit (right)

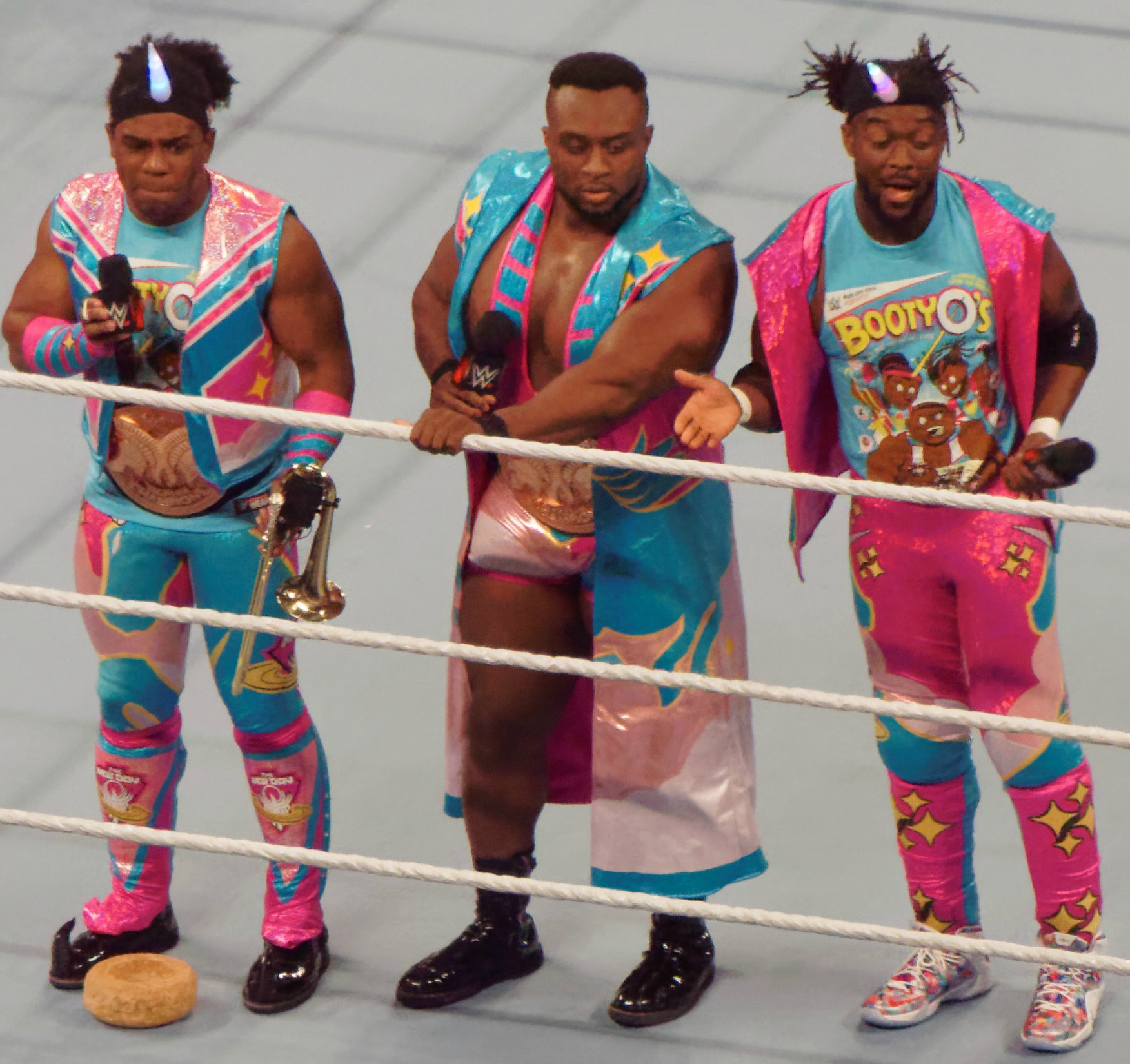
The New Day (left to right: Xavier Woods, Big E, and Kofi Kingston), who are record five-time champions and the longest single and combined reigning champions. The three were all recognized as champions under the Freebird Rule for the first two reigns until Big E was split from the team in the 2020 WWE Draft.

†	Indicates the current champion

Rank	Team	No. of reigns	Combined days	Combined days rec. by WWE
1	The New Day (Note: For the first two reigns, all three members were recognized as champion under the Freebird Rule, while for the subsequent reigns, only Kingston and Woods are recognized as Big E was split from the group.) (Big E, Kofi Kingston, and Xavier Woods)	5	699	
2	The Usos (Jey Uso and Jimmy Uso)	4	664	662
3	Paul London and Brian Kendrick	1	331	333
4	MNM (Joey Mercury and Johnny Nitro)	3	291	283
5	The Judgment Day (Finn Bálor and JD McDonagh)	2	287	
6	The Colóns (Carlito and Primo)	1	280	274
7	John Morrison and The Miz	1	250	246
8	Team Hell No (Kane and Daniel Bryan)	1	245	
9	The Street Profits (Montez Ford and Angelo Dawkins)	2	238	237
10	The Bar; Cesaro and Sheamus	4	238	236
11	The Viking Raiders/War Raiders (Erik and Ivar)	2	222	221
12	RK-Bro (Randy Orton and Riddle)	2	216	
13	The Judgment Day (Finn Bálor and Damian Priest)	2	208	207
14	The Vision (Austin Theory and Logan Paul/Bron Breakker)	2	208	206
15	Team Angle/The World's Greatest Tag Team (Shelton Benjamin and Charlie Haas)	2	180	176
16	Cody Rhodes/Stardust and Goldust	2	167	166
17	Kevin Owens and Sami Zayn	1	154	153
18	The Shield (Roman Reigns and Seth Rollins)	1	148	
19	Air Boom (Evan Bourne and Kofi Kingston)	1	146	145
19	The Hart Dynasty (David Hart Smith and Tyson Kidd)	1	146	145
21	Basham Brothers (Danny and Doug Basham)	2	145	141
22	Jeri-Show (Chris Jericho and Big Show)	1	140	139
23	Kofi Kingston and R-Truth	1	139	138
24	AJ Styles and Omos	1	133	132
24	Deuce 'n Domino	1	133	132
26	Curt Hawkins and Zack Ryder	2	127	131
27	Los Guerreros (Eddie and Chavo Guerrero)	2	114	
28	Primo and Epico	1	106	
29	The Revival (Dash Wilder and Scott Dawson)	2	104	103
30	The Nexus/The Corre (Heath Slater and Justin Gabriel)	3	100	99
31	Legion of Doom (Animal and Heidenreich)	1	93	94
32	Dean Ambrose and Seth Rollins	2	92	
33	Kenzo Suzuki and René Duprée	1	91	90
33	The New Nexus (David Otunga and Michael McGillicutty)	1	91	90
35	The Hurt Business (Cedric Alexander and Shelton Benjamin)	1	85	84
36	The O.C. (Luke Gallows and Karl Anderson)	2	84	
37	Awesome Truth (The Miz and R-Truth)	1	79	
37	Matt Hardy and Bray Wyatt	1	79	
39	Montel Vontavious Porter and Matt Hardy	1	77	76
39	Too Cool (Rikishi and Scotty 2 Hotty)	1	77	76
39	ShoMiz (Big Show and The Miz)	1	77	76
42	Santino Marella and Vladimir Kozlov	1	76	75
43	AJ Styles and Dragon Lee	1	70	
43	The Prime Time Players (Darren Young and Titus O'Neil)	1	70	69
45	Billy Kidman and Paul London	1	63	62
45	Bobby Roode and Chad Gable	1	63	
45	The Hardy Boyz (Jeff and Matt Hardy)	1	63	
45	Tyson Kidd and Cesaro	1	63	62
49	D-Generation X (Triple H and Shawn Michaels)	1	57	56
49	Eddie Guerrero and Rey Mysterio	1	57	59
51	Alpha Academy (Chad Gable and Otis)	1	56	
51	Charlie Haas and Rico	1	56	55
53	The B-Team (Bo Dallas and Curtis Axel)	1	50	
54	Dolph Ziggler and Drew McIntyre	1	49	
55	Eddie Guerrero and Tajiri	1	44	45
56	Buddy Murphy/Murphy and Seth Rollins	1	42	41
57	The Miz and Damien Mizdow	1	36	
57	The New Age Outlaws (Road Dogg and Billy Gunn)	1	36	
59	AOP (Akam and Rezar)	1	35	34
59	Cody Rhodes and Drew McIntyre	1	35	34
59	Rey Mysterio and Rob Van Dam	1	35	34
62	Jason Jordan and Seth Rollins	1	34	33
62	Big Show and Kane	1	34	30
64	Dolph Ziggler and Robert Roode	1	29	
65	Edge and Chris Jericho	1	28	27
66	Braun Strowman and Seth Rollins	1	27	26
67	Dudley Boyz (Bubba Ray and D-Von Dudley)	1	21	20
68	Kurt Angle and Chris Benoit	1	16	17
69	Penta and Je'Von Evans †	1	14+	
70	Batista and Rey Mysterio	1	14	13
71	Edge and Rey Mysterio	1	12	9
72	Cody Rhodes and Jey Uso	1	9	
73	Braun Strowman and Nicholas	1	1	<1
73	The Nexus (John Cena and David Otunga)	1	1	<1
75	John Cena and The Miz	1	<1	

=== By wrestler ===
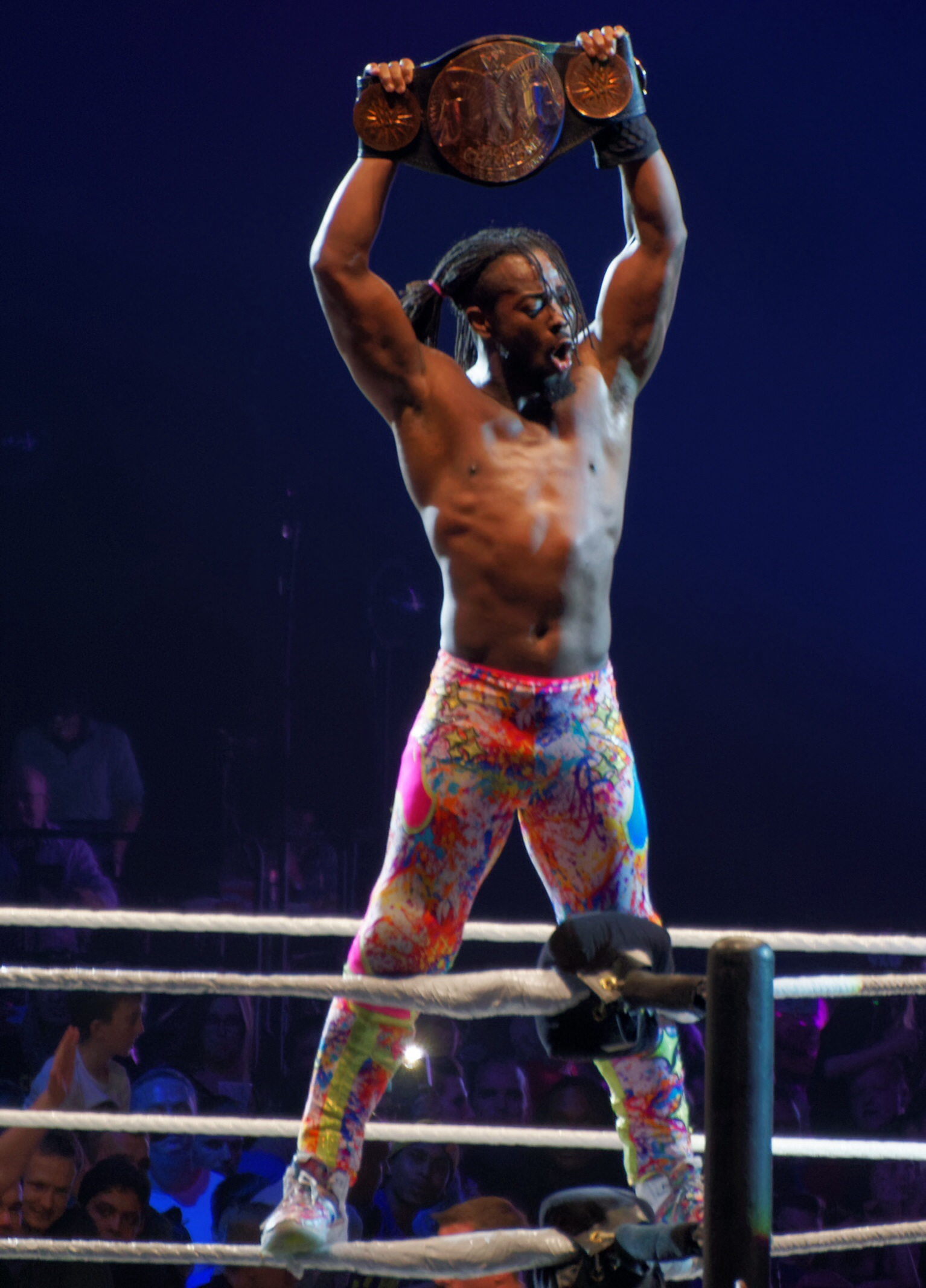
Record seven-time champion Kofi Kingston, who is also the longest combined-reigning champion at 984 days (982 days as recognized by WWE); Kingston has had four different partners, two of which were members of The New Day, which make up his last five reigns.

Rank	Wrestler	No. of reigns	Combined days	Combined days rec. by WWE
1	Kofi Kingston	7	984	982
2	Xavier Woods	5	699	
3	Jey Uso	5	673	671
4	Jimmy Uso	4	664	662
5	John Morrison	4 (Note: He was known as Johnny Nitro during his first three reigns with Joey Mercury.)	541	529
6	Big E	2	532	
7	Finn Bálor	4	495	494
8	The Miz	5	442	437
9	Paul London	2	394	395
10	Primo	2	386	382
11	Seth Rollins	6	343	340
12	Brian Kendrick	1	331	333
13	Cesaro	5	301	298
14	Joey Mercury	3	291	283
15	JD McDonagh	2	287	
16	Carlito	1	280	274
17	Kane	2	279	275
18	Shelton Benjamin	3	265	260
19	Big Show	3	251	245
20	Daniel Bryan	1	245	
21	Angelo Dawkins	2	238	237
21	Montez Ford	2	238	237
23	Sheamus	4	238	236
24	Charlie Haas	3	236	231
25	Erik	2	222	221
25	Ivar	2	222	221
27	Matt Hardy	3	219	
28	R-Truth	2	218	217
29	Randy Orton	2	216	
29	Riddle	2	216	
31	Eddie Guerrero	4	215	218
32	Cody Rhodes	4 (Note: He was known as Stardust during his third reign with Goldust.)	211	210
33	Tyson Kidd	2	209	207
34	Damian Priest	2	208	207
34	Austin Theory	2	208	206
36	AJ Styles	2	203	202
37	Chris Jericho	2	168	167
38	Goldust	2	167	166
39	Kevin Owens	1	154	153
39	Sami Zayn	1	154	153
41	Bron Breakker	2	152	151
42	Roman Reigns	1	148	
43	David Hart Smith	1	146	145
43	Evan Bourne	1	146	145
45	Danny Basham	2	145	141
45	Doug Basham	2	145	141
47	Curtis Axel	2 (Note: He was known as Michael McGillicutty during his first reign with David Otunga.)	141	140
48	Deuce	1	133	133
48	Domino	1	133	133
48	Omos	1	133	132
51	Curt Hawkins	2	127	131
51	Zack Ryder	2	127	131
53	Chad Gable	2	119	
54	Rey Mysterio	4	118	115
55	Chavo Guerrero	2	114	
56	Epico	1	106	
57	Dash Wilder	2	104	103
57	Scott Dawson	2	104	103
59	Heath Slater	3	100	99
59	Justin Gabriel	3	100	99
61	Animal	1	93	94
61	Heidenreich	1	93	94
63	Bobby Roode	2 (Note: He was known as Robert Roode during his second reign with Dolph Ziggler.)	92	
63	David Otunga	2	92	
63	Dean Ambrose	2	92	
66	Kenzo Suzuki	1	91	90
66	René Duprée	1	91	90
68	Cedric Alexander	1	85	84
69	Drew McIntyre	2	84	83
69	Karl Anderson	2	84	
69	Luke Gallows	2	84	
72	Bray Wyatt	1	79	
73	Dolph Ziggler	2	78	
74	Montel Vontavious Porter	1	77	
74	Rikishi	1	77	76
74	Scotty 2 Hotty	1	77	76
77	Santino Marella	1	76	
77	Vladimir Kozlov	1	76	
79	Dragon Lee	1	70	
79	Darren Young	1	70	69
79	Titus O'Neil	1	70	69
82	Billy Kidman	1	63	62
82	Jeff Hardy	1	63	
84	Shawn Michaels	1	57	56
84	Triple H	1	57	56
86	Logan Paul	1	56	
86	Otis	1	56	56
86	Rico	1	56	55
89	Bo Dallas	1	50	
90	Tajiri	1	44	45
91	Buddy Murphy	1 (Note: During his reign, on February 7, 2020, Buddy Murphy's ring name was shortened to Murphy.)	42	41
92	Edge	2	40	36
93	Billy Gunn	1	36	
93	Damien Mizdow	1	36	
93	Road Dogg	1	36	
96	Akam	1	35	34
96	Rezar	1	35	34
96	Rob Van Dam	1	35	34
99	Jason Jordan	1	34	33
100	Braun Strowman	2	28	26
101	Bubba Ray Dudley	1	21	20
101	D-Von Dudley	1	21	20
103	Chris Benoit	1	16	17
103	Kurt Angle	1	16	17
105	Je'Von Evans †	1	14+	
105	Penta †	1	14+	
107	Batista	1	14	13
108	John Cena	2	1	<1
108	Nicholas	1	1	<1

== See also ==
- List of World Tag Team Champions (WWE, 1971–2010)
- Tag team championships in WWE
