= Survivor Series (2021) =

WWE pay-per-view and livestreaming event

- Promotional poster featuring Big E
- Promotion: WWE
- Brand(s): Raw; SmackDown
- Date: November 21, 2021
- City: Brooklyn, New York
- Venue: Barclays Center
- Attendance: 13,000

WWE event chronology
← Previous; Crown Jewel	Next → NXT WarGames

Survivor Series chronology
← Previous; 2020	Next → 2022

The 2021 Survivor Series was a professional wrestling pay-per-view (PPV) and livestreaming event produced by WWE, held for wrestlers from the promotion's main roster brands, Raw and SmackDown. It was the 35th annual Survivor Series event and took place on November 21, 2021, at the Barclays Center in the New York City borough of Brooklyn, New York, which was the fourth to be held in a New York City borough, after 1996, 2002, and 2011 at Madison Square Garden. The theme of the event was brand supremacy in which every match on the card involved wrestlers from the two brands in direct competition, including the titular Survivor Series match, a tag team elimination match that pits teams of multiple wrestlers against each other.

Seven matches were contested at the event, including one on the Kickoff pre-show. The card was highlighted by two Survivor Series matches: Raw's men's and women's teams were victorious over SmackDown's. In the main event match, SmackDown's Universal Champion Roman Reigns defeated Raw's WWE Champion Big E. In other prominent matches, Raw Tag Team Champions RK-Bro (Randy Orton and Riddle) defeated SmackDown Tag Team Champions The Usos (Jey Uso and Jimmy Uso), and in the opening bout, Raw Women's Champion Becky Lynch defeated SmackDown Women's Champion Charlotte Flair. The event also commemorated the 25th anniversary of The Rock's WWE debut at the 1996 Survivor Series where a 25-man dual-branded battle royal took place in honor of the occasion; Raw's Omos won by last eliminating SmackDown's Ricochet. Raw won brand supremacy by winning five of the seven matches, only excluding the pre-show and main event matches. The event also had a promotional tie-in with the Netflix film Red Notice, which starred The Rock, though The Rock himself did not appear at the event despite rumors before the show suggesting that he would appear.

This was the final Survivor Series to carry the brand supremacy theme as well as featuring any Survivor Series matches, as the event became based around the WarGames match beginning in 2022, with the event subsequently rebranded as Survivor Series: WarGames, although the Survivor Series match would return for the 2026 event. It was also WWE's last main roster event to carry the term "pay-per-view" as WWE began to use the term "premium live event" for all PPV and livestreaming events, including NXT's, beginning with Day 1 in January 2022. This was also the first Survivor Series to livestream on SonyLIV in India and Peacock in the United States following the shutdown of the Indian version of the WWE Network in February and the American version in April.

== Production ==
=== Background ===
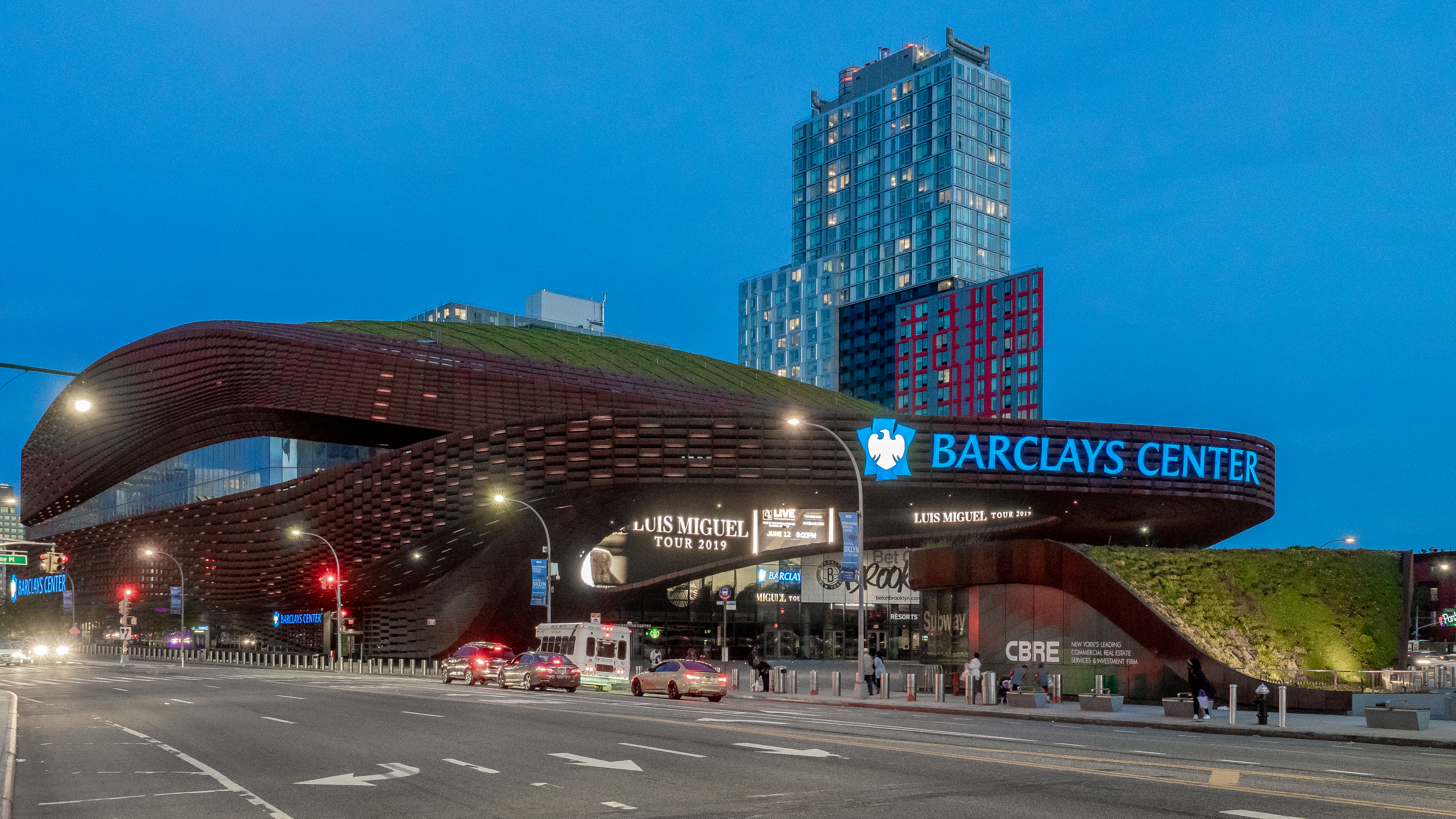
The 35th annual Survivor Series event was held at the Barclays Center in Brooklyn, New York.

Survivor Series is an annual professional wrestling event, produced every November by WWE since 1987, generally held around Thanksgiving in the United States. It was originally broadcast exclusively via pay-per-view (PPV) before it began simultaneously livestreaming on the WWE Network in 2014. In what has become the second longest-running PPV event in history (behind WWE's WrestleMania), it is one of the promotion's original four PPVs, along with WrestleMania, SummerSlam, and Royal Rumble, referred to as the "Big Four", and as of August 2021, it is considered one of the "Big Five", along with Money in the Bank. The event is traditionally characterized by having Survivor Series matches, which are tag team elimination matches that typically pits teams of four or five wrestlers against each other.

Announced on August 16, 2021, the 35th Survivor Series was scheduled to be held on November 21, 2021, at the Barclays Center in the New York City borough of Brooklyn, New York. This marked the fourth Survivor Series to be held in a New York City borough, and subsequently fourth in the U.S. state of New York, after 1996, 2002, and 2011, which were in Manhattan at Madison Square Garden. Tickets went on sale on September 24 through SeatGeek.

Since WWE reintroduced the brand split in July 2016, Survivor Series became centered around competition between wrestlers from Raw and SmackDown for brand supremacy. In addition to traditional Survivor Series matches between the brands, the champions of Raw faced their SmackDown counterparts in non-title matches, which began at the 2017 event. The 2021 Survivor Series featured Raw's WWE Champion against SmackDown's Universal Champion, the Raw Women's Champion against the SmackDown Women's Champion, Raw's United States Champion against SmackDown's Intercontinental Champion, and the Raw Tag Team Champions against the SmackDown Tag Team Champions. The 2019 event had also featured NXT involved in the competition, being elevated to WWE's third main brand with its debut on the USA Network, making all brand supremacy matches triple threats. NXT was removed from the 2020 event due to COVID-19-related issues, and in September 2021, it reverted to its previous status as the developmental brand for the main roster under the "NXT 2.0" banner.

=== Broadcast outlets ===
Survivor Series was broadcast on traditional PPV worldwide. It was also available to livestream on Peacock in the United States, SonyLIV in India, and the WWE Network everywhere else. This was the first Survivor Series to livestream on SonyLIV and Peacock, following the shutdown of the Indian version of the WWE Network in February and the American version in April.

=== Storylines ===
The event comprised seven matches, including one on the Kickoff pre-show, that resulted from scripted storylines. Results were predetermined by WWE's writers on the Raw and SmackDown brands, while storylines were produced on WWE's weekly television shows, Monday Night Raw and Friday Night SmackDown.

On November 6, WWE revealed both Raw and SmackDown's team members for the men's Survivor Series match. Team Raw's members were announced to be Seth Rollins, Finn Bálor, Kevin Owens, Rey Mysterio, and Dominik Mysterio. On the November 8 episode of Raw, WWE official Adam Pearce noted that every member of Team Raw was a former world champion, except Dominik. In turn, Pearce scheduled Dominik to face Bobby Lashley where the winner would be on the team; Lashley defeated Dominik. After Rey was seemingly injured during a match with Lashley the following week, Pearce removed Rey from Team Raw and replaced him with Austin Theory. For Team SmackDown, its members were announced as Drew McIntyre, Jeff Hardy, King Woods, Sami Zayn, and Happy Corbin. On the November 12 episode of SmackDown, Hardy defeated Zayn in a match where the loser would be removed from the team. The vacant spot was filled the following week by Sheamus, who defeated Cesaro, Jinder Mahal, and Ricochet in a fatal four-way match to earn the spot.

Also on November 6, WWE revealed both Raw and SmackDown's team members for the women's Survivor Series match. It was announced that Bianca Belair, Liv Morgan, Carmella, Queen Zelina, and one-half of the WWE Women's Tag Team Champions, Rhea Ripley, would represent Team Raw. Team SmackDown's members were revealed to be Sasha Banks, Shayna Baszler, Shotzi, Natalya, and Aliyah. On the November 12 episode of SmackDown, however, WWE official Sonya Deville removed Aliyah from the match seemingly due to her relationship with Naomi, who had been at odds with Deville. On November 18, Deville revealed via WWE's social media that Toni Storm would fill Team SmackDown's vacant spot.

A prominent rivalry heading into Survivor Series was between WWE Champion Big E and Universal Champion Roman Reigns. On the September 17 episode of SmackDown, Big E interrupted a promo by Reigns, The Usos (Jey Uso and Jimmy Uso), and Paul Heyman of The Bloodline. Reigns and Big E then posed with their belts, leading to a tag team match where Big E was victorious. Later that night, he told Heyman and Reigns that he would face the Universal Champion at Survivor Series before The Usos attacked him. This led to a six-man tag team match pitting The New Day (Kofi Kingston, Big E, and Xavier Woods) against Reigns and The Usos on the September 20 episode of Raw, which The Bloodline won after interference from Bobby Lashley. This led to a triple threat match where Reigns defeated Big E and Lashley, who Reigns pinned. With The New Day resuming their feud with The Usos in late October, on November 8, it was announced that Big E would face Reigns one-on-one at Survivor Series.

Also on November 8, it was announced that Raw Women's Champion Becky Lynch and SmackDown Women's Champion Charlotte Flair, who have had a long history with each other, would face each other at Survivor Series.

For the remaining champion vs. champion matches, on November 15, WWE announced Raw Tag Team Champions RK-Bro (Randy Orton and Riddle) vs. SmackDown Tag Team Champions The Usos (Jey Uso and Jimmy Uso) and Raw's United States Champion Damian Priest vs. SmackDown's Intercontinental Champion Shinsuke Nakamura, the latter of which was scheduled for the Kickoff pre-show on the day of the event.

To commemorate the 25th anniversary of The Rock's WWE debut at the 1996 Survivor Series, a 25-man dual-branded battle royal was scheduled to take place at the 2021 event.

== Event ==
Other on-screen personnel
Role:	Name:
English commentators	Michael Cole (SmackDown)
English commentators	Pat McAfee (SmackDown)
English commentators	Jimmy Smith (Raw)
English commentators	Corey Graves (Raw)
English commentators	Byron Saxton (Raw)
Spanish commentators	Carlos Cabrera
Spanish commentators	Marcelo Rodriguez
Ring announcer	Mike Rome
Referees	Danilo Anfibio
Referees	Jason Ayers
Referees	Jessika Carr
Referees	Dan Engler
Referees	Darrick Moore
Referees	Eddie Orengo
Referees	Chad Patton
Referees	Ryan Tran
Pre-show panel	Kayla Braxton
Pre-show panel	Kevin Patrick
Pre-show panel	Peter Rosenberg
Pre-show panel	Booker T
Pre-show panel	Jerry Lawler

=== Pre-show ===
On the Survivor Series Kickoff pre-show, SmackDown's Intercontinental Champion Shinsuke Nakamura (accompanied by Rick Boogs) faced Raw's United States Champion Damian Priest. Priest controlled the match early while Boogs played his guitar to try and distract Priest. Priest performed a Falcon Arrow for a near-fall. Nakamura countered a Chokeslam with his knee. Priest performed a South of Heaven for a nearfall. Priest attempted The Reckoning, but Nakamura countered with an armbar. In the end, Priest broke Boogs's guitar over his knee and hit Boogs over the head before accidentally hitting Nakamura with it and getting himself disqualified, thus Nakamura won, giving SmackDown the first point of the night.

Also during the pre-show, WWE Chairman and Chief Executive Officer Mr. McMahon arrived at the arena holding what he said was a real Cleopatra golden egg, which was part of a promotional tie-in with the Netflix film Red Notice, which starred The Rock.

=== Preliminary matches ===
The actual event opened with Raw Women's Champion Becky Lynch taking on SmackDown Women's Champion Charlotte Flair. The two started the match by slapping and hair pulling. Flair attempted the Top Rope Moonsault, but Lynch shoved her off the top rope to the floor. Lynch applied the Dis-Arm-Her, but Flair countered with a Powerbomb. Lynch performed a leg drop to the back of Flair's neck while she was caught up in the ropes. Lynch attempted her own version of Flair's figure-four leglock, but Flair reversed the pressure until Lynch made it to the ropes. Flair performed a Queen's Boot for a nearfall. Lynch performed an Inverted DDT and a Manhandle Slam, but Flair put her foot on the bottom rope to void the pin. Flair performed a Top Rope Moonsault on Lynch outside the ring. Back inside, Flair did a roll-up pin, but the referee caught her holding onto the ropes for leverage. Lynch then reversed the pin and used the ropes herself as leverage to win the match, giving Raw its first point of the night, tying the brands at 1–1.

Next was the men's Survivor Series match where Team Raw (Seth Rollins, Finn Bálor, Kevin Owens, Bobby Lashley, and Austin Theory) took on Team SmackDown (Drew McIntyre, Jeff Hardy, King Woods, Sheamus, and Happy Corbin). At the start, Owens walked out on his team and got eliminated by countout. Corbin was eliminated by Bálor following a Coup de Grâce. Woods was eliminated by Lashley as he passed out in the Hurt Lock. Lashley and McIntyre fought outside the ring and both were eliminated by countout. Bálor was eliminated by Sheamus after a Brogue Kick. Sheamus was eliminated by Theory with a roll-up. Sheamus attacked Hardy before leaving, but Hardy eliminated Theory after a Swanton Bomb. Hardy performed a Twist of Fate on Rollins, but Rollins got the knees up to block the Swanton Bomb and performed The Stomp on Hardy to win the match as the sole survivor for Team Raw, thus putting the score at 2–1 for Raw.

In a backstage segment, Roman Reigns met with Mr. McMahon in the latter's office. There, McMahon showed Reigns the golden egg that he said was given to him by Reigns's cousin, The Rock, and that it was worth $100 million as it was the real egg and not a prop used in Red Notice.

After that was the 25-man dual-branded battle royal to celebrate the 25th anniversary of The Rock's WWE debut. Raw's Omos dominated the match by eliminating half of the competitors. His tag team partner AJ Styles stayed outside the ring for most of the match, but was eliminated despite help from Omos. Omos won the match after last eliminating SmackDown's Ricochet, thus giving Raw a 3–1 lead over SmackDown.

The fourth match saw Raw Tag Team Champions RK-Bro (Randy Orton and Riddle) taking on SmackDown Tag Team Champions The Usos (Jey Uso and Jimmy Uso). This was Orton's 177th match on pay-per-view, breaking a tie with Kane for most pay-per-view matches contested. In the end, Jey performed a Superkick on Riddle. Both Usos performed Double Superkicks on both Orton and Riddle. Jimmy went for the Uso Splash on Riddle, not knowing that Orton was the legal competitor. Orton caught Jimmy in mid-air with an RKO to win the match, thus putting the score at 4–1 for Raw, clinching brand supremacy for the night.

In another backstage segment, Mr. McMahon, Adam Pearce, and Sonya Deville were talking in McMahon's office when they realized that the golden egg had disappeared. McMahon ordered Deville to call the police and then told Pearce to tell everyone on both the Raw and SmackDown rosters to report to Raw the next night as he was going to get to the bottom of it.

The penultimate match was the women's Survivor Series match where Team Raw (Bianca Belair, Rhea Ripley, Liv Morgan, Carmella, and Queen Zelina) took on Team SmackDown (Sasha Banks, Shayna Baszler, Shotzi, Natalya, and Toni Storm). Carmella was eliminated by Storm after a roll-up while Carmella was trying to put her protective mask on. Storm then eliminated Zelina by performing the Storm One. Morgan eliminated Storm after performing an Oblivion on Storm. Morgan was eliminated by Banks after both Banks and Shotzi performed back-to-back Frog Splashes on Morgan. Baszler eliminated Ripley by pinfall after a Knee Strike, leaving Belair at a 4-on-1 disadvantage. Banks and Shotzi began to argue as Baszler tried to calm things down, but Banks shoved Shotzi into Baszler. Shotzi, Baszler, and Natalya all kept Banks from returning to the ring, resulting in Banks being eliminated by countout. Natalya locked Belair in the Sharpshooter, but Belair kicked Natalya into Baszler and Belair eliminated Natalya with a roll-up. Belair eliminated Baszler after a Glam Slam and then pinned Shotzi after the Kiss of Death to win the match for Team Raw as the sole survivor, and giving Raw an overall 5–1 lead for the night.

Another backstage segment occurred where interviewer Kayla Braxton informed Roman Reigns's special counsel Paul Heyman that Brock Lesnar's suspension was no longer indefinite.

=== Main event ===
In the main event, Raw's WWE Champion Big E faced SmackDown's Universal Champion Roman Reigns (accompanied by Paul Heyman). Big E attempted the Apron Splash, but Reigns moved out of the way. Big E applied a Stretch Muffler, but Reigns escaped. Reigns performed a Rock Bottom on Big E for a nearfall. Reigns performed a Superman Punch twice, but missed a Spear attempt and Big E performed a Spear through the ropes to put Reigns on the floor. Big E attempted a second one, but Reigns countered with the Guillotine submission. Big E countered the submission and performed a Big Ending on Reigns, who got his foot on the bottom rope during the pin. Reigns performed a Spear for a nearfall. On the outside, Big E threw Reigns into the announce table and the barricade, but Reigns reversed another attack and threw Big E into the steel steps. Reigns performed a Superman Punch, and back in the ring, Reigns attacked Big E's injured knee and performed a second Spear on Big E to win the match. Although this gave SmackDown another win, it was only SmackDown's second win for the night, with the final score being 5–2.

== Aftermath ==
=== Raw ===
The following night on Raw, Mr. McMahon addressed the entire Raw and SmackDown roster over the stolen Cleopatra Egg, stating that whoever found it would be rewarded with a WWE Championship match. He also threatened to fire Adam Pearce and Sonya Deville if the egg was not found. Sami Zayn revealed to McMahon that it was Austin Theory who stole the egg, and Theory explained that he had just wanted to take a selfie with it. McMahon was first mad at Theory, but then told Theory he showed intestinal fortitude, rewarding him a WWE Championship match against Big E in the main event, much to Zayn's confusion and displeasure. Theory, however, lost the title match. This began a storyline between McMahon and Theory, with Theory becoming McMahon's protégé until McMahon announced his first retirement in July 2022.

Also on Raw, Seth Rollins talked about being the sole survivor for his team at Survivor Series when Finn Bálor interrupted. The two were scheduled to have a match that night, but it never began when Rollins laid out Bálor with two Stomps. Their match was rescheduled for the following week, where Rollins won.

After the aforementioned title match, Big E attacked Kevin Owens and Seth Rollins, who showed up during the match. The following week, Rollins (who announced that his match against Big E for the WWE Championship would take place at Day 1) attacked Owens during the latter's match against Big E. As a result, Owens was added to the title match, making it a triple threat match. However, two weeks later, it became a fatal four-way match when Bobby Lashley, who recently completed his feud with Rey and Dominik Mysterio, defeated Owens, Rollins, and Big E in a gauntlet match.

=== SmackDown ===
On the following episode of SmackDown, a Black Friday Invitational Battle Royal took place, where the winner would face Roman Reigns for the Universal Championship at a future date. In the end, Jeff Hardy thought he won by last eliminating Happy Corbin, but Sami Zayn, who wasn't officially eliminated, eliminated Hardy to win the match. Immediately afterwards, it was announced that Brock Lesnar's suspension was lifted and he would return the following week. There, he convinced Zayn into cashing in his title shot that night. It was then announced that the winner would defend the title against Lesnar at Day 1. Just before the match, Lesnar attacked Zayn, allowing Reigns to quickly defeat Zayn and retain the title, officially scheduling Reigns to defend the championship against Lesnar at Day 1.

After Shayna Baszler, Shotzi, and Natalya caused Sasha Banks to be eliminated by countout during the women's Survivor Series match, Banks teamed with Naomi, who would continue her feud with Sonya Deville over the next few weeks, to defeat Natalya and Baszler on the following episode of SmackDown.

=== Future ===
The 2021 Survivor Series would be the final to carry the brand supremacy theme, as on September 19, 2022, WWE executive Paul "Triple H" Levesque announced that the 2022 event would not be based on this concept. Triple H also announced that the 2022 event would feature two WarGames matches, one each for the men and women, marking the first time for a main roster WWE event to feature the match; this in turn discontinued NXT's annual WarGames event, which was held from 2017 until 2021. The 2022 Survivor Series was subsequently rebranded as "Survivor Series: WarGames", which was established as the new name for the event going forward as the annual event became based around the WarGames matches. This would also be the final Survivor Series to feature a Survivor Series match until 2026.

== Results ==
No.	Results	Stipulations	Times
1^{P}	Shinsuke Nakamura (SmackDown's Intercontinental Champion) (with Rick Boogs) defeated Damian Priest (Raw's United States Champion) by disqualification	Champion vs. Champion singles match	9:25
2	Becky Lynch (Raw Women's Champion) defeated Charlotte Flair (SmackDown Women's Champion) by pinfall	Champion vs. Champion singles match	18:15
3	Team Raw (Seth Rollins, Finn Bálor, Kevin Owens, Austin Theory, and Bobby Lashley) (with MVP) defeated Team SmackDown (Drew McIntyre, Jeff Hardy, King Woods, Happy Corbin, and Sheamus) (with Madcap Moss)^{1}	5-on-5 men's Survivor Series match	30:00
4	Omos won by last eliminating Ricochet (Note: Order of elimination: Drew Gulak, Shelton Benjamin, Humberto, R-Truth, Otis, Chad Gable, T-Bar, Cedric Alexander, Angel, Jinder Mahal, Erik, Ivar, Shanky, Mansoor, Robert Roode, Dolph Ziggler, Sami Zayn, Commander Azeez, AJ Styles, Apollo Crews, Cesaro, Angelo Dawkins, Montez Ford, Ricochet)	The Rock 25th Anniversary Battle Royal; 25-man Dual Brand Battle Royal	10:45
5	RK-Bro (Randy Orton and Riddle) (Raw Tag Team Champions) defeated The Usos (Jey Uso and Jimmy Uso) (SmackDown Tag Team Champions) by pinfall	Champions vs. Champions tag team match	14:50
6	Team Raw (Bianca Belair, Rhea Ripley, Liv Morgan, Carmella, and Queen Zelina) defeated Team SmackDown (Sasha Banks, Shayna Baszler, Shotzi, Natalya, and Toni Storm)^{2}	5-on-5 women's Survivor Series match	23:45
7	Roman Reigns (SmackDown's Universal Champion) (with Paul Heyman) defeated Big E (Raw's WWE Champion) by pinfall	Champion vs. Champion singles match	21:55
P / – the match was broadcast on the pre-show

=== Survivor Series matches ===
^1

Eliminated	Wrestler	Brand	Eliminated by	Method	Time
1	Kevin Owens	Raw	N/A	Countout	0:55
2	Happy Corbin	SmackDown	Finn Bálor	Pinfall	7:50
3	King Woods	SmackDown	Bobby Lashley	Technical submission	13:25
4	Bobby Lashley	Raw	Drew McIntyre	Countout	16:35
5	Drew McIntyre	SmackDown	Bobby Lashley	Countout	16:35
6	Finn Bálor	Raw	Sheamus	Pinfall	19:30
7	Sheamus	SmackDown	Austin Theory	Pinfall	24:35
8	Austin Theory	Raw	Jeff Hardy	Pinfall	27:00
9	Jeff Hardy	SmackDown	Seth Rollins	Pinfall	30:00
Sole Survivor:	Seth Rollins (Team Raw)				30:00

^2

Eliminated	Wrestler	Brand	Eliminated by	Method	Time
1	Carmella	Raw	Toni Storm	Pinfall	1:00
2	Queen Zelina	Raw	Toni Storm	Pinfall	13:55
3	Toni Storm	SmackDown	Liv Morgan	Pinfall	15:00
4	Liv Morgan	Raw	Sasha Banks	Pinfall	16:10
5	Rhea Ripley	Raw	Shayna Baszler	Pinfall	17:40
6	Sasha Banks	SmackDown	N/A	Countout	20:05
7	Natalya	SmackDown	Bianca Belair	Pinfall	21:15
8	Shayna Baszler	SmackDown	Bianca Belair	Pinfall	21:45
9	Shotzi	SmackDown	Bianca Belair	Pinfall	23:45
Sole Survivor:	Bianca Belair (Team Raw)				23:45
