= RK-Bro =

Former professional wrestling tag team

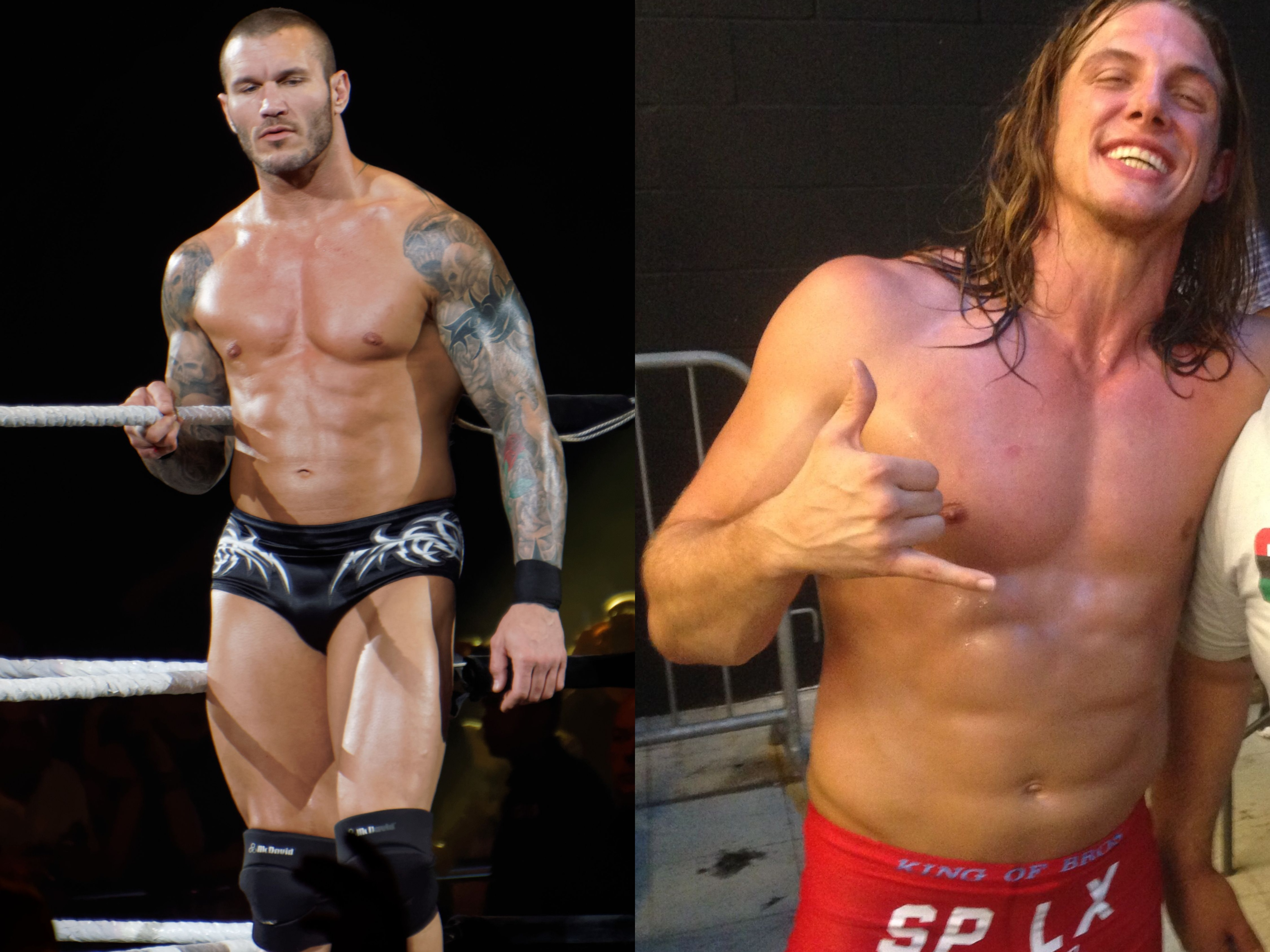
- Randy Orton (left) and Matt Riddle (right)

Tag team
- Members: Randy Orton; Riddle / Matt Riddle
- Name(s): RK-Bro; Randy Orton and Riddle
- Billed heights: Orton: 6 ft 5 in (1.96 m); Riddle: 6 ft 2 in (1.88 m)
- Combined billed weight: 466 lb (211 kg)
- Debut: April 26, 2021
- Disbanded: September 22, 2023
- Years active: 2021–2023

RK-Bro was an American professional wrestling tag team composed of Randy Orton and Matt Riddle. They were known for their time in WWE, where they performed on the Raw brand. The team's name was derived from Orton's initials and finisher "RKO" and combined with Riddle's catchphrase, "Bro". They were former two-time WWE Raw Tag Team Champions.

The team was initially formed in April 2021. After Orton incurred a back injury in May 2022, RK-Bro went on hiatus, although Riddle carried on the gimmick. However, during Orton's hiatus, the team was effectively disbanded after Riddle was released from WWE in September 2023.

== History ==
=== Formation (2021) ===
On the April 19, 2021 episode of Raw, Riddle would interrupt the backstage interview of Randy Orton where Riddle suggested a tag team formation, with Orton dismissing the idea by leaving. A match was made later on in the night between Orton and Riddle, which Riddle won with a roll-up. The following week on Raw, Orton was backstage with Riddle when he suggested the team be given a try. Later on, the newly labeled RK-Bro defeated Cedric Alexander and Shelton Benjamin. In a backstage interview afterwards, Orton suggested to Riddle they take the team "a day at a time", thus turning Orton into a face.

On the May 3 episode of Raw, Orton and Riddle defeated Elias and Jaxson Ryker; this brought RK-Bro's record to 2–0. On the May 10 episode of Raw, RK-Bro teamed up with The New Day (Kofi Kingston and Xavier Woods) to defeat AJ Styles, Omos, Elias, and Ryker in an eight-man tag team match, increasing RK-Bro's record to 3–0. On the June 14 episode of Raw, RK-Bro defeated The New Day in a tag team match, bringing RK-Bro's record to 4–0. The following week on the June 21 episode of Raw, Orton faced John Morrison in a Money in the Bank qualifying match, but was defeated, while Riddle won his qualifying match against Drew McIntyre. The following week, Orton was scheduled to face AJ Styles and Drew McIntyre in a last chance match, but for unknown reasons was pulled and replaced by Riddle who would go on to lose the match for Orton.

=== Raw Tag Team Champions (2021–2022) ===
After a seven-week absence, Orton returned on the August 9 episode of Raw, where he initially discontinued his team with Riddle. Later that night, Orton defeated AJ Styles in a match following assistance from Riddle and afterwards pretended to hug him, however, Orton attacked Riddle with an RKO, which was not construed as a heel turn but rather as Orton's unique way of showing gratitude. The following week, Orton officially reunited the team after Riddle saved him from an attack at the hands of AJ Styles and Omos. At SummerSlam, RK-Bro defeated Styles and Omos to win their first WWE Raw Tag Team Championship, both individually and as a team, giving Omos his first WWE loss by pinning Styles. On the August 30 edition of Raw, they successfully defended their titles against Bobby Lashley and MVP of The Hurt Business. At Crown Jewel, RK-Bro would retain their titles against AJ Styles and Omos. At Survivor Series, RK-Bro would defeat SmackDown Tag Team Champions, The Usos in an interbrand match. RK-Bro would then go on the successfully defend the Raw Tag Team Championships against Dolph Ziggler and Robert Roode on the November 29 episode of Raw and against The Street Profits at Day 1.

On the January 10, 2022, episode of Raw, RK-Bro dropped the titles to Alpha Academy (Chad Gable and Otis), ending their reign at 142 days. However, on the March 7 episode of Raw, RK-Bro regained their tag team championships in a triple threat tag team match against Alpha Academy and the team of Kevin Owens and Seth "Freakin" Rollins; with Riddle pinning Chad Gable. At night two of WrestleMania 38, RK-Bro successfully defended their Raw Tag Team Championships in a triple threat tag team match against The Street Profits and Alpha Academy. On the April 11 episode of Raw, SmackDown Tag Team Champions The Usos issued a challenge to RK-Bro, who accepted and the match was made official as a Winners Takes All championship unification match at WrestleMania Backlash. However, on the April 29 episode of SmackDown, the contract signing for the match ended with Roman Reigns assisting The Usos in attacking RK-Bro and tearing up the contract in the process. Drew McIntyre then came out and joined forces with RK-Bro in driving off The Bloodline from the ring. Because of what had transpired, Roman Reigns' special counsel, Paul Heyman, then met with WWE official Adam Pearce backstage where Heyman requested that the resulting tag team championship unification match be called off and instead, a six-man tag team match featuring The Bloodline against RK-Bro and Drew McIntyre be made for WrestleMania Backlash, in which they lost after Roman Reigns pinned Riddle. The unification match between The Usos and RK-Bro was later scheduled on the May 20 episode of SmackDown, where they lost their titles to The Usos, ending their second reign at 74 days, resulting in Randy Orton suffering a back injury.

=== Orton's injury and quiet split (2022–2023) ===
Following Orton's injury, Riddle continued to carry the gimmick throughout the rest of 2022, not knowing when Orton would make a return (Orton would return in November 2023). In September 2023, however, Riddle was released from WWE, effectively disbanding the team.

== Championships and accomplishments ==
- Pro Wrestling Illustrated
  - Ranked No. 6 of the top 100 Tag Teams in the PWI Tag Team 100 in 2022
- WWE
  - WWE Raw Tag Team Championship (2 times)
