= Smackville =

2019 WWE Network event

WWE Smackville
- Promotional poster featuring Dolph Ziggler, Kofi Kingston, and Samoa Joe
- Promotion: WWE
- Brand: SmackDown
- Date: July 27, 2019
- City: Nashville, Tennessee
- Venue: Bridgestone Arena

WWE event chronology
← Previous; Extreme Rules	Next → NXT TakeOver: Toronto

WWE Network special chronology
← Previous; The Shield's Final Chapter	Next → Starrcade

Smackville was a 2019 professional wrestling livestreaming event produced by WWE, held for wrestlers from the promotion's main roster brand, SmackDown. It took place on July 27, 2019, at Bridgestone Arena in Nashville, Tennessee with a portion of it airing as a one-hour WWE Network special. It was the sixth of seven originally scheduled house shows to broadcast as a WWE Network special. This was also the first and only main roster livestreaming event to be brand-exclusive since Fastlane in March 2018.

Nine matches were contested on the card, three of which were shown for the one-hour WWE Network special. Due to the wild card rule, a couple of matches involved wrestlers from Raw. In the main event of the non-televised live show, Bayley defeated Charlotte Flair and Raw's Alexa Bliss in a triple threat match to retain the SmackDown Women's Championship, while in the main event of the televised portion of the show, Kofi Kingston retained the WWE Championship in a triple threat match against Dolph Ziggler and Raw's Samoa Joe.

== Production ==
=== Background ===
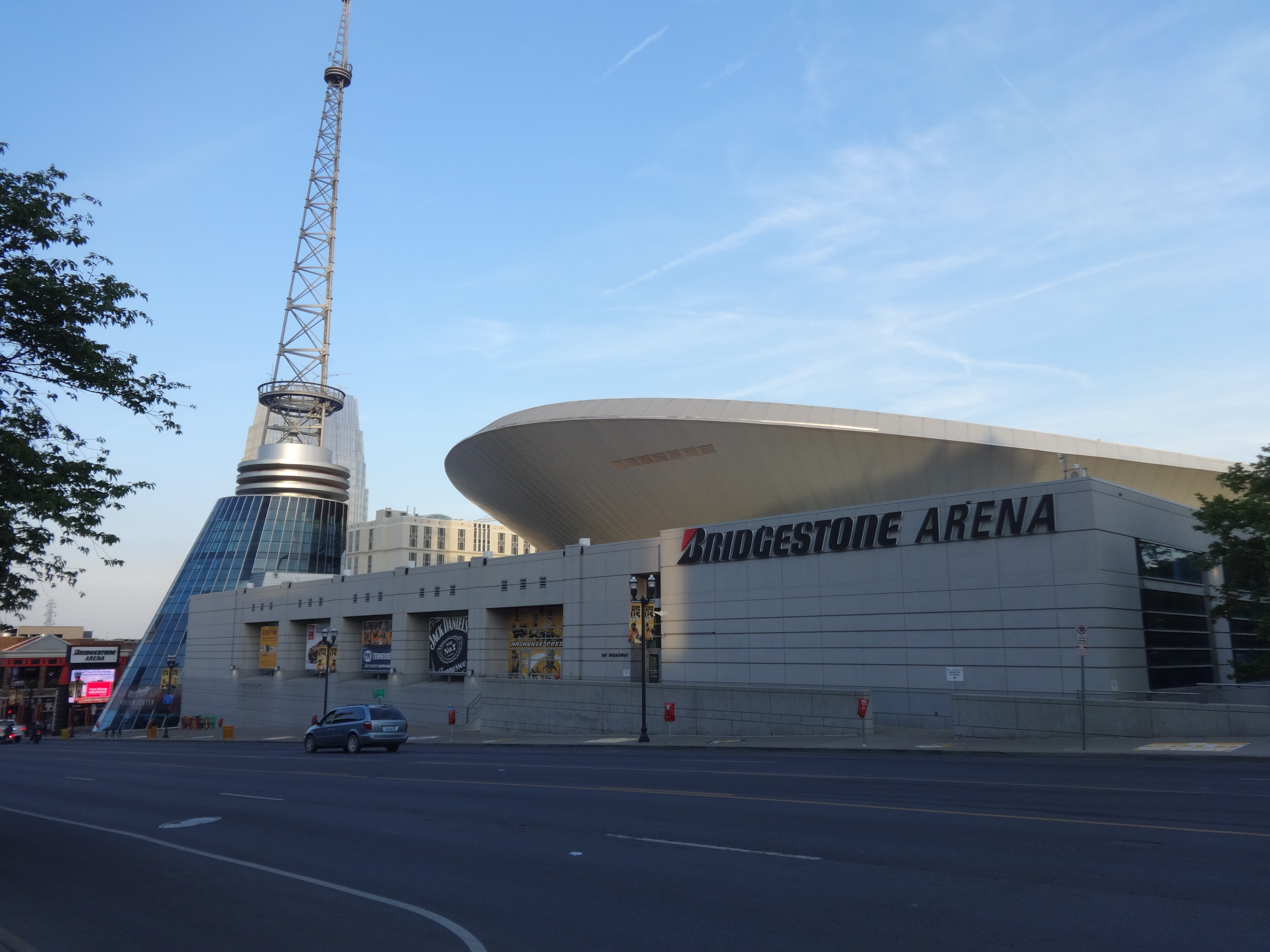
The event was held at the Bridgestone Arena in Nashville, Tennessee.

In 2015, the American professional wrestling promotion WWE began to expand its content on the WWE Network by broadcasting originally scheduled house shows, which are non-televised events. The first three events showed the majority of the card, but beginning with Starrcade in November 2018, only a portion of the card was broadcast as a one-hour WWE Network-exclusive special. Smackville took place on July 27, 2019, at Bridgestone Arena in Nashville, Tennessee and featured wrestlers from the SmackDown brand.

This was the sixth originally scheduled house show to broadcast as a WWE Network special, after The Beast in the East in July 2015, Live from Madison Square Garden in October 2015, Roadblock in March 2016, Starrcade in November 2018, and The Shield's Final Chapter in April 2019. This was also the first main roster livestreaming event to be brand-exclusive since Fastlane in March 2018 as WWE had discontinued brand-exclusive pay-per-view and livestreaming events for the main roster after WrestleMania 34 in April 2018.

=== Storylines ===
Other on-screen personnel
Role:	Name:
Commentators	Tom Phillips
Commentators	David Otunga
Ring announcer	Greg Hamilton
Referees	Danilo Anfibio
Referees	Ryan Tran

The card included nine matches, three of which were shown for the one-hour WWE Network special. The matches resulted from scripted storylines. Results were predetermined by WWE's writers on the SmackDown brand, while storylines were produced on WWE's weekly television show SmackDown Live.

On the May 21 episode of SmackDown, Dolph Ziggler, who had been inactive since January's Royal Rumble event, made a surprise return and attacked Kofi Kingston. Ziggler, a Raw wrestler at the time appearing via the wild card rule, later explained that it should have been him who got the opportunity to go to WrestleMania 35 and win the WWE Championship instead of Kingston. Ziggler, who was in turn moved to SmackDown, then lost to Kingston at both Super ShowDown and Stomping Grounds. On the June 24 episode of Raw, after Kingston had defeated both Kevin Owens and Sami Zayn in consecutive singles matches, Kingston was randomly attacked by Raw's Samoa Joe, who performed an "uranage" on Kingston. As referees tended to the champion, Joe returned and applied the "Coquina Clutch" on Kingston. Kingston would defeat Joe at Extreme Rules. On July 18, a WWE Championship triple threat match between the three wrestlers was announced for Smackville.

At Money in the Bank, Bayley won the women's Money in the Bank ladder match and later that night cashed in the contract on Charlotte Flair to win the SmackDown Women's Championship. On the June 4 episode of SmackDown, Flair competed in a triple threat match against Carmella and Raw's Alexa Bliss, who appeared via the wild card rule, in order to earn a rematch against Bayley for the title at Stomping Grounds. Bliss, however, won the match, thus Bliss earned the title match at Stomping Grounds, but lost. She and Cross then faced Bayley at Extreme Rules in a two-on-one handicap match for the title, but the two were defeated by Bayley. On July 18, a SmackDown Women's Championship triple threat match between Bayley, Flair, and Bliss was announced for Smackville, though this match was not shown on the WWE Network special.

During the Extreme Rules pre-show, Shinsuke Nakamura defeated Finn Bálor to win the Intercontinental Championship. A rematch was later scheduled for Smackville; however, Bálor was removed from the match on July 27 after suffering an undisclosed injury and was replaced by Ali.

In addition to the matches, a musical performance by Elias was also announced for the show.

== Results ==
No.	Results	Stipulations	Times
1^{D}	The New Day (Big E and Xavier Woods) (c) defeated The B-Team (Bo Dallas and Curtis Axel)	Tag team match for the WWE SmackDown Tag Team Championship	13:48
2^{D}	Aleister Black defeated Andrade (with Zelina Vega)	Singles match	12:06
3	Shinsuke Nakamura (c) defeated Ali	Singles match for the WWE Intercontinental Championship	8:05
4	Kevin Owens defeated Elias	Singles match	4:10
5	Kofi Kingston (c) defeated Dolph Ziggler and Samoa Joe	Triple threat match for the WWE Championship	12:15
6^{D}	Heavy Machinery (Otis and Tucker) defeated AOP (Akam and Rezar)	Tag team match	8:04
7^{D}	The IIconics (Billie Kay and Peyton Royce) (c) defeated The Kabuki Warriors (Asuka and Kairi Sane)	Tag team match for the WWE Women's Tag Team Championship	16:24
8^{D}	Sami Zayn defeated Apollo Crews	Singles match	9:15
9^{D}	Bayley (c) defeated Charlotte Flair and Alexa Bliss	Triple threat match for the WWE SmackDown Women's Championship	12:59
(c) / – the champion(s) heading into the match; D / – this was a dark match
