= Starrcade (2019) =

WWE Network event

- Promotional poster featuring Lana, Bobby Lashley, Rusev, Kevin Owens, Sasha Banks, and Becky Lynch
- Promotion: WWE
- Brand(s): Raw; SmackDown
- Date: December 1, 2019
- City: Duluth, Georgia
- Venue: Infinite Energy Arena

WWE event chronology
← Previous; Survivor Series	Next → TLC: Tables, Ladders & Chairs

Starrcade chronology
← Previous; 2018	Next → Final

WWE Network specials chronology
← Previous; Smackville	Next → Final

The 2019 Starrcade was a professional wrestling livestreaming event produced by WWE, held for wrestlers from the promotion's main roster brands, Raw and SmackDown. It was WWE's third annual Starrcade and the 21st and final overall. The event took place on December 1, 2019, at the Infinite Energy Arena in Duluth, Georgia with a portion of it airing as a one-hour WWE Network special. This was the first Starrcade held in December since the former World Championship Wrestling's final edition in 2000, and it was the seventh and final originally scheduled house show to broadcast as a WWE Network special.

Eleven matches were contested on the card, four of which were broadcast live for the one-hour WWE Network special. In the main event of the non-televised live show, "The Fiend" Bray Wyatt defeated Braun Strowman in a Steel Cage match to retain SmackDown's Universal Championship, while in the main event of the televised portion of the show, Bobby Lashley defeated Kevin Owens by disqualification.

Part-way through the broadcast, WWE began to stream the remainder of the special on YouTube; the WWE Network experienced a major service outage predominantly in the eastern United States. Due to the COVID-19 pandemic, an event was not held in 2020 with no further events scheduled.

== Production ==
=== Background ===
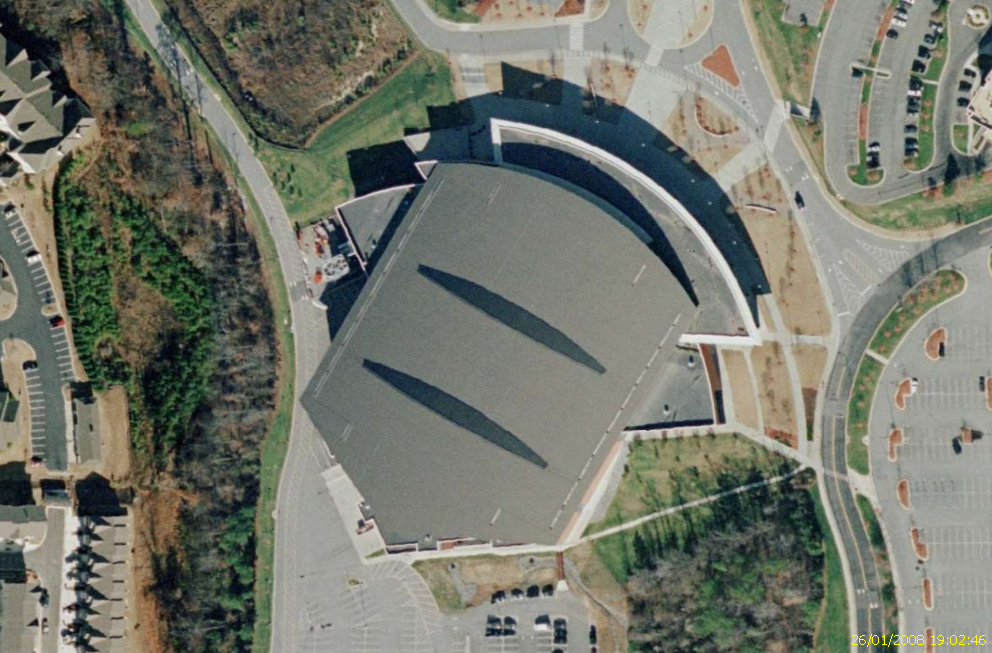
WWE's third annual Starrcade was held at the Infinite Energy Arena in Duluth, Georgia.

Starrcade was a live closed-circuit event that was conceived in 1983 by Dusty Rhodes. The event was originally held every November and was produced under the National Wrestling Alliance (NWA) banner by NWA member Jim Crockett Promotions (JCP). The NWA and JCP regarded Starrcade as their flagship event of the year, much in the same vein that its rival, the World Wrestling Federation (WWF), would begin to regard WrestleMania two years later. In 1987, the event began broadcasting on pay-per-view (PPV) and in 1988, JCP was sold to Turner Broadcasting and became World Championship Wrestling (WCW), with Starrcade being held as WCW's annual December PPV from 1988 until 2000; WCW and its assets were acquired by the WWF the following year (the WWF itself was renamed to WWE in 2002).

After a 17-year hiatus, WWE revived Starrcade as a non-televised house show on November 25, 2017, held exclusively for wrestlers from the promotion's SmackDown brand division. On November 24, 2018, WWE held a second Starrcade event, featuring wrestlers from both Raw and SmackDown, but unlike the prior year, a portion of the event aired on tape delay the next day as a one-hour WWE Network special. On September 17, 2019, WWE announced that its third Starrcade event, again featuring Raw and SmackDown, would take place on December 1, 2019, held at the Infinite Energy Arena in Duluth, Georgia, moving the event back to December for the first time since WCW's final edition in 2000.

Like the previous year, a portion aired as a one-hour WWE Network special, but unlike the previous year, the one-hour special was livestreamed. It was the seventh originally scheduled house show to broadcast as a WWE Network special, after The Beast in the East in July 2015, Live from Madison Square Garden in October 2015, Roadblock in March 2016, the prior year's Starrcade in November 2018, The Shield's Final Chapter in April 2019, and Smackville in July 2019.

=== Storylines ===
Other on-screen personnel
Role	Name
Commentators	Tom Phillips
Commentators	Byron Saxton
Ring announcers	Mike Rome
Referees	Shawn Bennett
Referees	Charles Robinson
Referees	Dan Engler

Starrcade consisted of professional wrestling matches that involved various different wrestlers from pre-existing scripted feuds and storylines. Results were predetermined by WWE's writers on the Raw and SmackDown brands, while storylines were produced on WWE's weekly television shows, Monday Night Raw and Friday Night SmackDown.

== Aftermath ==
The 2019 Starrcade would in turn be the final Starrcade, as an event for 2020 was not scheduled due to the COVID-19 pandemic, which caused the cancelation of all live events outside of WWE's main shows, which were held behind closed doors. WWE resumed live touring in July 2021, but a Starrcade event was not scheduled for that year. This was also the final originally scheduled house show to be repurposed into a WWE Network special for similar reasons, and also due to the global phase out of the WWE Network as in 2021, WWE began to move its content to other platforms, with the WWE Network completely shut down worldwide by April 2026.

== Results ==
No.	Results	Stipulations	Times
1^{D}	Seth Rollins defeated Erick Rowan	Singles match	12:46
2^{D}	Shinsuke Nakamura (c) (with Sami Zayn) defeated The Miz	Singles match for the WWE Intercontinental Championship	15:46
3	Street Profits (Angelo Dawkins and Montez Ford) defeated The O.C. (Luke Gallows and Karl Anderson)	Tag team match	10:06
4	The Kabuki Warriors (Asuka and Kairi Sane) (c) defeated Becky Lynch and Charlotte Flair, Bayley and Sasha Banks, and Alexa Bliss and Nikki Cross by submission	Fatal 4-Way Tag team match for the WWE Women's Tag Team Championship	13:30
5	Bobby Lashley (with Lana) defeated Rusev by forfeit	Last Man Standing match	—
6	Bobby Lashley (with Lana) defeated Kevin Owens by disqualification	Singles match	14:16
7^{D}	Aleister Black defeated Andrade (with Zelina Vega)	Singles match	9:34
8^{D}	Ricochet defeated Andrade (with Zelina Vega)	Singles match	6:33
9^{D}	Randy Orton defeated AJ Styles	Singles match	20:58
10^{D}	Roman Reigns defeated King Corbin	Singles match	11:23
11^{D}	"The Fiend" Bray Wyatt (c) defeated Braun Strowman by escaping the cage	Steel cage match for the WWE Universal Championship	10:32
(c) / – the champion(s) heading into the match; D / – this was a dark match
