= Fastlane (2019) =

WWE pay-per-view and livestreaming event

- Promotional poster featuring Daniel Bryan and Kevin Owens
- Promotion: WWE
- Brand(s): Raw; SmackDown
- Date: March 10, 2019
- City: Cleveland, Ohio
- Venue: Quicken Loans Arena

WWE event chronology
← Previous; Elimination Chamber	Next → NXT TakeOver: New York

Fastlane chronology
← Previous; 2018	Next → 2021

The 2019 Fastlane was a professional wrestling pay-per-view (PPV) and livestreaming event produced by WWE, held for wrestlers from the promotion's main roster brands, Raw and SmackDown. It was the fifth annual Fastlane and took place on March 10, 2019, at the Quicken Loans Arena in Cleveland, Ohio. The event's name was a reference to its position on the "Road to WrestleMania".

Ten matches were contested at the event, including one on the Kickoff pre-show. In the main event, The Shield (Dean Ambrose, Seth Rollins, and Roman Reigns) defeated Baron Corbin, Bobby Lashley, and Drew McIntyre in a six-man tag team match that was promoted as The Shield's final match together before one further match was scheduled at The Shield's Final Chapter in April. In other prominent matches, Becky Lynch defeated Charlotte Flair by disqualification, adding her back into the Raw Women's Championship match at WrestleMania 35, and Daniel Bryan retained SmackDown's WWE Championship by defeating Kevin Owens and Mustafa Ali in a triple threat match. This event marked the final WWE pay-per-view appearance for Dean Ambrose, who left the company in April 2019 after he declined to renew his contract; he then joined All Elite Wrestling (AEW) and New Japan Pro-Wrestling (NJPW) in May 2019 under his pre-WWE ring name Jon Moxley.

This was the second Fastlane held at the Quicken Loans Arena after the 2016 event. An event was not held in 2020 due to the scheduling of that year's Super ShowDown, but Fastlane returned in 2021. After the 2018 event was held exclusively for SmackDown, the 2019 event was held for both Raw and SmackDown as brand-exclusive PPV and livestreaming events for the main roster under the second brand split were discontinued following WrestleMania 34 in April 2018. This made it the first Fastlane to feature multiple brands during a brand split.

== Production ==
=== Background ===
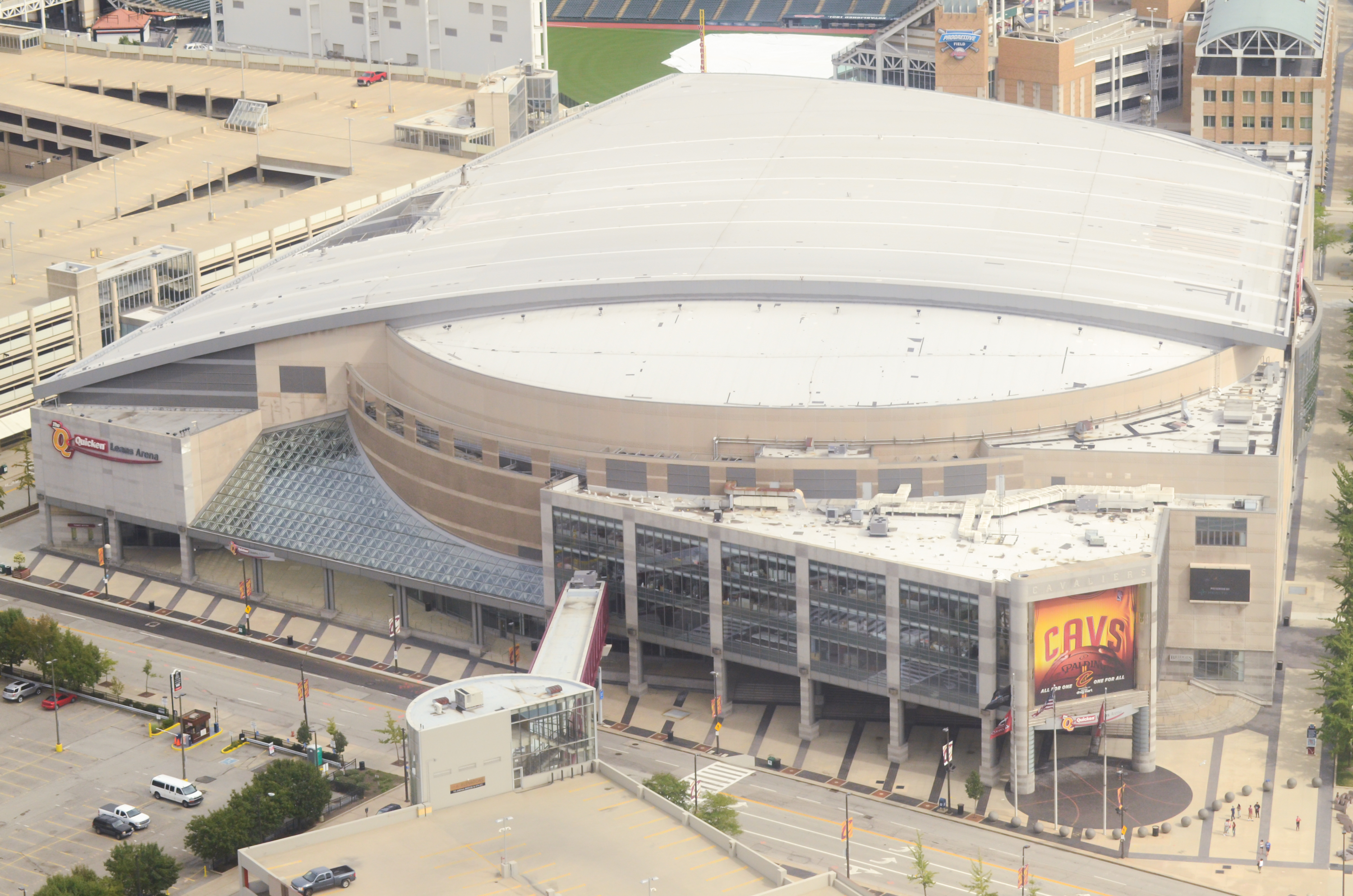
The fifth annual Fastlane was the second time for the event to be held at the Quicken Loans Arena in Cleveland, Ohio, after 2016.

Fastlane was an annual professional wrestling pay-per-view (PPV) and livestreaming event first produced by WWE in 2015. The name of the event was a reference to its position on the "Road to WrestleMania", being held in the two-month period between the Royal Rumble and WWE's flagship event. The first two Fastlane events were held in February before moving to March. Announced on November 22, 2018, the fifth Fastlane was scheduled for March 10, 2019, at the Quicken Loans Arena in Cleveland, Ohio, and was the second Fastlane held at this venue, after the 2016 event. In addition to airing on traditional pay-per-view worldwide, it was livestreamed on the WWE Network. While the 2018 event was a SmackDown-exclusive event, WWE discontinued brand-exclusive PPV and livestreaming events for the main roster following WrestleMania 34 in April that year, thus the 2019 event featured wrestlers from both the Raw and SmackDown brands, which made it the first Fastlane to feature multiple brands during a brand split.

=== Storylines ===
The event comprised 10 matches, including one on the Kickoff pre-show, that resulted from scripted storylines. Results were predetermined by WWE's writers on the Raw and SmackDown brands, while storylines were produced on WWE's weekly television shows, Monday Night Raw and SmackDown Live.

At Elimination Chamber, The Usos (Jey Uso and Jimmy Uso) defeated The Miz and Shane McMahon to win the SmackDown Tag Team Championship. On the following episode of SmackDown, The Miz, who had been pinned, apologized to Shane for costing them the match and begged Shane to schedule a rematch. The Usos interrupted and insulted Miz, after which, Shane scheduled a rematch for the titles at Fastlane.

On the February 12 episode of SmackDown, The New Day's Kofi Kingston was a last-minute replacement for an injured Mustafa Ali in a gauntlet match to determine who would enter the WWE Championship Elimination Chamber match last; Kingston pinned WWE Champion Daniel Bryan and lasted over an hour before being eliminated. At Elimination Chamber, Bryan retained the title in the titular match, with Kingston being the last wrestler eliminated. On the following episode of SmackDown, Kingston was granted a WWE Championship match at Fastlane after pinning Bryan in a six-man tag team match that featured Kingston, AJ Styles, and Jeff Hardy against Bryan, Samoa Joe, and Randy Orton. The following week, however, WWE Chairman Vince McMahon interrupted the contract signing between Bryan and Kingston. Although Vince praised Kingston, he replaced him with a returning Kevin Owens, stating that Owens was more qualified and more deserving of the opportunity.

At Elimination Chamber, The Boss 'n' Hug Connection (Bayley and Sasha Banks) defeated Sonya Deville and Mandy Rose, The Riott Squad (represented by Liv Morgan and Sarah Logan), The IIconics (Billie Kay and Peyton Royce), Naomi and Carmella, and Nia Jax and Tamina in a tag team Elimination Chamber match to become the inaugural holders of the WWE Women's Tag Team Championship. The following night on Raw, their championship celebration was interrupted by Jax and Tamina, and Jax taunted Banks about not being able to retain a championship in her title defenses. The following week, The Boss 'n' Hug Connection were scheduled to defend the titles against Jax and Tamina at Fastlane.

On the February 19 episode of SmackDown, during a backstage segment, SmackDown Women's Champion Asuka was interrupted by Sonya Deville and Mandy Rose. Rose challenged Asuka to a non-title match and defeated her after Rose feigned an eye injury. The following week, Rose was granted a championship match against Asuka at Fastlane.

At the Royal Rumble, Becky Lynch was unsuccessful in regaining the SmackDown Women's Championship, but later entered the women's Royal Rumble match and won by last eliminating Charlotte Flair, despite injuring her own knee. The next night on Raw, Lynch confronted Raw Women's Champion Ronda Rousey and chose to face her at WrestleMania 35. Lynch then refused a medical examination on her knee after a brawl with Flair on SmackDown. Stephanie McMahon gave Lynch an ultimatum: have her knee examined or be suspended until she does. Lynch still refused and attacked both Stephanie and Triple H. The following Raw, it was revealed that Lynch had been medically cleared; after she apologized for the attacks, the suspension was lifted, however, Vince McMahon overruled Triple H and Stephanie by suspending Lynch for 60 days and replaced her with Flair as Rousey's WrestleMania opponent. On the February 25 episode of Raw, Lynch was arrested after attacking Rousey; Rousey then demanded that Lynch be reinstated and left the championship in the ring. The following week, Stephanie declared the title vacant, reinstated Lynch, and scheduled a match between her and Flair for the championship at Fastlane. Later on, however, Rousey protested that she did not vacate the title and was only trying to send a message, prompting Stephanie to hand her back the title belt and change the stipulation of the Fastlane match: if Lynch won, she would be added back into the championship match at WrestleMania to make it a triple threat match.

On the October 22, 2018, episode of Raw, Roman Reigns went on hiatus due to leukemia and subsequently vacated the Universal Championship. Later that same night, Dean Ambrose turned on Seth Rollins, feeling that the trio's stable, The Shield, had made him weak. Rollins and Ambrose then fought over the next couple of months, with their feud culminating at TLC: Tables, Ladders & Chairs, where Ambrose defeated Rollins. Reigns returned on the February 25, 2019, episode of Raw and explained that his leukemia was in remission and that he would return to action. Later that night, Drew McIntyre defeated Ambrose in a no disqualification match after interference from Elias. Afterwards, Baron Corbin and Bobby Lashley joined Elias and McIntyre in their attack on Ambrose until Reigns and Rollins made the save. The following week, Reigns called out Rollins, wanting to reunite The Shield one more time. Rollins reluctantly agreed since it meant having to team with Ambrose again. Later, after Ambrose was defeated by Elias, Reigns and Rollins came out, but Ambrose exited through the crowd. Corbin, McIntyre, and Lashley then ambushed Reigns and Rollins, after which, Ambrose returned and aided his former Shield brothers. After gaining the upper hand, Ambrose joined Reigns and Rollins for the signature Shield fist bump and a six-man tag team match pitting the reunited Shield against Corbin, McIntyre, and Lashley was scheduled for Fastlane.

On the February 11 episode of Raw, The Revival (Dash Wilder and Scott Dawson) defeated Bobby Roode and Chad Gable to win the Raw Tag Team Championship. The following week, NXT call-ups Aleister Black and Ricochet made their main roster debuts, and then defeated The Revival in a non-title match on the February 25 episode. On the March 4 episode, Black and Ricochet were granted a Raw Tag Team Championship match against The Revival, but it ended in disqualification after Roode and Gable attacked The Revival. A triple threat tag team championship match between the three teams was then scheduled for Fastlane.

After several weeks of feuding, a match between Andrade and Rey Mysterio was scheduled for the Fastlane Kickoff pre-show.

On March 8, a tag team match between The New Day (represented by Big E and Xavier Woods) and Rusev and Shinsuke Nakamura was scheduled for the Fastlane Kickoff pre-show.

== Event ==
Other on-screen personnel
Role:	Name:
English commentators	Michael Cole (Raw)
English commentators	Corey Graves (all matches)
English commentators	Renee Young (Raw)
English commentators	Tom Phillips (SmackDown)
English commentators	Byron Saxton (SmackDown)
English commentators	Beth Phoenix (Women's Tag Team Title match)
Spanish commentators	Carlos Cabrera
Spanish commentators	Marcelo Rodríguez
German commentators	Carsten Schaefer
German commentators	Tim Haber
German commentators	Calvin Knie
Ring announcers	Greg Hamilton (SmackDown)
Ring announcers	Mike Rome (Raw)
Referees	Danilo Anfibio
Referees	Jason Ayers
Referees	Mike Chioda
Referees	John Cone
Referees	Darrick Moore
Referees	Chad Patton
Referees	Charles Robinson
Referees	Rod Zapata
Interviewers	Charly Caruso
Interviewers	Kayla Braxton
Pre-show panel	Jonathan Coachman
Pre-show panel	Beth Phoenix
Pre-show panel	Sam Roberts
Pre-show panel	David Otunga
Pre-show panel	Christian
Pre-show panel	AJ Styles

=== Pre-show ===
Backstage during the Fastlane Kickoff pre-show, R-Truth's manager Carmella was attempting to get people to sign a petition so that Truth could have a rematch for SmackDown's United States Championship, as Truth had lost the title on the previous episode of SmackDown in a fatal four-way match to Samoa Joe, which also involved Andrade and Rey Mysterio. Joe interrupted and said that he had no problem facing any of them. It was then announced that Joe would defend the United States Championship in a fatal four-way match against Truth, Andrade, and Mysterio on the main show, subsequently canceling the pre-show match between Andrade and Mysterio.

Also during the pre-show, Kofi Kingston was told that Vince McMahon had wanted to see him in regard to the WWE Championship match on the main card.

In what then became the only match on the pre-show, The New Day (represented by Big E and Xavier Woods) faced Rusev and Shinsuke Nakamura. In the end, Big E and Woods performed the "Midnight Hour" on Rusev to win the match.

=== Preliminary matches ===
The actual pay-per-view opened with The Usos (Jey Uso and Jimmy Uso) defending the SmackDown Tag Team Championship against The Miz and Shane McMahon. The climax saw Miz perform a frog splash on Jey. However, Jey countered into a roll-up on Miz to retain the titles. After the match, a disappointed Miz and Shane hugged Miz's father, who was in the front row. After Shane consoled Miz and his father, Shane then attacked Miz from behind, turning heel.

Next, Asuka defended the SmackDown Women's Championship against Mandy Rose, who was accompanied by Sonya Deville. In the end, Rose tripped on the ring apron, which Deville had moved prior to obtaining a kendo stick, allowing Asuka to perform a kick to the face on Rose to retain the title.

After that, The New Day's Kofi Kingston came out for what he thought was a triple threat match for SmackDown's WWE Championship, after Vince McMahon agreed to put Kingston in the WWE Championship match with Big E and Xavier Woods banned from ringside. However, Kingston ended up facing The Bar (Cesaro and Sheamus) in a 2-on-1 handicap match, in which both Cesaro and Sheamus could be in the ring at the same time. In the closing moments, after The Bar continued to dominate Kingston, Big E and Woods came out to assist Kingston, only to get intercepted by Shinsuke Nakamura and Rusev. The Bar then performed a double "White Noise" on Kingston to win the match.

In the fourth match, The Revival (Scott Dawson and Dash Wilder) defended the Raw Tag Team Championship in a triple threat tag team match against the teams of Bobby Roode and Chad Gable, and Aleister Black and Ricochet. In the end, The Revival performed "Shatter Machine" on Gable to retain the titles. After the match, Roode, Black, and Ricochet attacked The Revival, with Ricochet and Black performing their respective finishers on them.

Next, Samoa Joe defended the United States Championship in a fatal four-way match against R-Truth (accompanied by Carmella), Andrade (accompanied by Zelina Vega), and Rey Mysterio. In the end, Mysterio performed the 619 on Joe and went for Droppin' the Dime, but Joe countered it into the "Coquina Clutch" on Mysterio, who passed out, thus Joe retained the title.

After that, The Boss 'n' Hug Connection (Bayley and Sasha Banks) defended the WWE Women's Tag Team Championship against Nia Jax and Tamina. In the climax, Bayley countered a powerbomb attempt by Jax into a hurricanrana to retain the titles. After the match, Jax and Tamina attacked Banks and Bayley. Beth Phoenix, who was on commentary, came to their aid, but was attacked by Jax and Tamina. Natalya then came out to assist, but was also overpowered by Jax and Tamina.

Next was the triple threat match for the WWE Championship that Vince McMahon announced earlier. After Kevin Owens and WWE Champion Daniel Bryan (accompanied by Rowan) made their entrances, Mustafa Ali was then revealed as the third participant. In the climax, Ali performed a Tornado DDT on Bryan outside the ring, only for Owens to powerbomb Ali on the apron. Rowan prevented Owens from entering the ring and Bryan covered Ali for a nearfall. As Ali leapt from the middle rope, Bryan performed a running knee on Ali to retain the title. After the match, Rowan performed a chokeslam on Ali.

In the penultimate match, Becky Lynch faced Charlotte Flair with the stipulation that if Lynch won, she would be added back into the Raw Women's Championship match at WrestleMania 35 to make that match a triple threat match. Lynch showed up with crutches and during the match, Flair focused on Lynch's injured knee. Lynch intercepted a Moonsault from Charlotte, who managed to enter the ring at the eight count. Lynch applied the Dis-arm-her, but Flair escaped the hold and applied the "Figure-Eight Leglock". However, Raw Women's Champion Ronda Rousey came out and attacked Lynch, thus causing Lynch to win by disqualification. Due to Lynch winning, she was added to the Raw Women's Championship match at WrestleMania 35.

In a small filler segment, Elias appeared to sing to the crowd, but was interrupted by Lacey Evans, who walked down the ramp and then exited. Randy Orton then surprise attacked the distracted Elias with an "RKO". AJ Styles then appeared and performed a "Phenomenal Forearm" on Orton.

=== Main event ===
In the main event, The Shield (Dean Ambrose, Roman Reigns, and Seth Rollins) faced Baron Corbin, Drew McIntyre, and Bobby Lashley in a six-man tag team match. Throughout the match, both teams fought all over the arena and executed their respective finishers, but the match continued. In the climax, The Shield performed a triple powerbomb on McIntyre through an announce table. The Shield then performed their respective finishers on Corbin and then another triple powerbomb on Corbin for the win. Afterwards, the three hugged in the ring and did their signature fistbump to end the event.

== Aftermath ==
The 2019 Fastlane event was the final Fastlane to occur until the 2021 event. In 2020, Fastlane was removed from the schedule to allow WWE to hold that year's Super ShowDown.

=== Raw ===
The following night on Raw, The Shield (Roman Reigns, Seth Rollins, and Dean Ambrose) opened the show. Reigns stated that if Fastlane was The Shield's final match together, he had no regrets. Reigns then thanked Ambrose and Rollins, after which, Rollins turned his attention to his WrestleMania 35 match against Universal Champion Brock Lesnar. After Lesnar's advocate Paul Heyman came out, Rollins was attacked from behind by Shelton Benjamin, one of Lesnar's old friends. The two then had a match that Rollins won. Reigns later was scheduled to have his first singles match on Raw in five months and against Baron Corbin, but was attacked by Drew McIntyre. Rollins and Ambrose came to assist Reigns. Ambrose then faced McIntyre in a Falls Count Anywhere match in a losing effort. The following week, McIntyre defeated Rollins after interference from Lesnar. Also that same episode, McIntyre challenged Reigns to a match at WrestleMania 35. On the March 25 episode, McIntyre claimed that he destroyed The Shield and brought up Reigns's leukemia and family, prompting Reigns to accept the challenge. Later that night, McIntyre again defeated Ambrose, this time in a Last Man Standing match. This would be Ambrose's final televised WWE match, as on the April 8 episode, Ambrose was scheduled to face Bobby Lashley, but Ambrose attacked Lashley and Lio Rush, only for Lashley to gain the upper hand, ending the attack by slamming Ambrose through the announce table. Ambrose's final contractual WWE match occurred on The Shield's Final Chapter, where he, Reigns, and Rollins defeated Corbin, McIntyre, and Lashley.

Raw Women's Champion Ronda Rousey said she interfered in Becky Lynch and Charlotte Flair's match to embarrass and expose them both. She said that both were a joke and could defeat both in a handicap match. Rousey was interrupted by Dana Brooke, however, Rousey attacked Brooke with the Piper's Pit. The following week, Rousey easily retained the Raw Women's Championship against Brooke, and after the match, Rousey kept the armbar applied until referees broke it up. Rousey then attacked a security guard and her husband, Travis Browne, attacked another before leaving.

Aleister Black and Ricochet then faced and defeated Bobby Roode and Chad Gable. Afterwards, The Revival attacked Black and Ricochet from behind.

Natalya, accompanied by Beth Phoenix, faced Nia Jax, accompanied by Tamina. The match ended in disqualification after Phoenix attacked Jax. After the match backstage, The Boss 'n' Hug Connection (Bayley and Sasha Banks) attacked Jax and Tamina. The following week, Phoenix announced that she would be coming out of retirement to reform her tag team and challenge for the WWE Women's Tag Team Championship at WrestleMania 35. Banks then defeated Natalya via disqualification after interference from Tamina. Banks and Bayley then made a surprise appearance on the March 19 episode of SmackDown, where they lost to The IIconics (Billie Kay and Peyton Royce) in a non-title match. The champions were then scheduled to defend the WWE Women's Tag Team Championship against The IIconics, Jax and Tamina, and Natalya and Phoenix at WrestleMania 35.

=== SmackDown ===
On the following episode of SmackDown, Daniel Bryan teamed up with Erick Rowan to take on Mustafa Ali and Kevin Owens in a winning effort.

Also on SmackDown, The New Day (Big E, Kofi Kingston, and Xavier Woods) confronted Vince McMahon and Kingston asked what he had to do to get a WWE Championship match. Mr. McMahon stated that Kingston was not championship material, but if he could defeat Randy Orton, Samoa Joe, Cesaro, Sheamus, and Rowan in a gauntlet match the following week, he would receive a WWE Championship match against Daniel Bryan at WrestleMania 35. Kingston managed to do so, but after the match, McMahon stated that Kingston would be going to WrestleMania if he could defeat another opponent. He also banned Big E and Woods from ringside and wished Kingston luck. That final opponent was the WWE Champion himself, who defeated Kingston. On the March 26 episode, The New Day teased leaving WWE, and McMahon stated that Kingston would only get his WWE Championship match at WrestleMania 35 if Big E and Woods won a tag team gauntlet match, which they subsequently did. Kingston and Bryan then signed the contract for their title match on the final SmackDown before WrestleMania.

Shane McMahon addressed his attack on The Miz. He said that he was tired of being used and that he enjoyed beating up Miz and wanted to do it again at WrestleMania 35. He then scheduled a match between himself and Miz for WrestleMania 35. The match was then stipulated as a Falls Count Anywhere match.

Randy Orton compared his WWE career to that of AJ Styles's career on the indies, including Styles' time in Ring of Honor and TNA. After further insults between the two, Styles challenged Orton to a match at WrestleMania 35, and Orton accepted.

Sonya Deville faced Asuka in a non-title match. A similar incident occurred with the ring apron, but this time with Mandy Rose causing Deville to trip on it, causing her to lose the match.

Becky Lynch claimed that she had used mind games on Ronda Rousey, essentially tricking her into getting Lynch back into the WrestleMania match. Charlotte Flair then came out and claimed that neither Lynch or Rousey would be relevant without her and that she was "Ms. WrestleMania". Flair then defeated Asuka to win the SmackDown Women's Championship on the March 26 episode of SmackDown. This turned the women's championship match at WrestleMania 35, which was announced as the first ever women's match to main event WrestleMania, into a Winner Takes All match for both the Raw and SmackDown women's championships.

Samoa Joe and Andrade teamed up to face R-Truth and Rey Mysterio in which Mysterio pinned Joe. Joe then attacked Truth after the match. The following week, Mysterio announced that he would be facing Joe for the United States Championship at WrestleMania 35.

== Results ==
No.	Results	Stipulations	Times
1^{P}	The New Day (Big E and Xavier Woods) defeated Shinsuke Nakamura and Rusev (with Lana) by pinfall	Tag team match	13:20
2	The Usos (Jey Uso and Jimmy Uso) (c) defeated The Miz and Shane McMahon by pinfall	Tag team match for the WWE SmackDown Tag Team Championship	14:10
3	Asuka (c) defeated Mandy Rose (with Sonya Deville) by pinfall	Singles match for the WWE SmackDown Women's Championship	6:40
4	The Bar (Cesaro and Sheamus) defeated Kofi Kingston by pinfall	Handicap match (Note: Big E and Xavier Woods were banned from ringside.)	5:15
5	The Revival (Scott Dawson and Dash Wilder) (c) defeated Bobby Roode & Chad Gable and Aleister Black & Ricochet by pinfall	Triple threat match for the WWE Raw Tag Team Championship	10:50
6	Samoa Joe (c) defeated Andrade (with Zelina Vega), R-Truth (with Carmella), and Rey Mysterio by technical submission	Fatal four-way match for the WWE United States Championship	10:50
7	The Boss 'n' Hug Connection (Bayley and Sasha Banks) (c) defeated Nia Jax and Tamina by pinfall	Tag team match for the WWE Women's Tag Team Championship	7:05
8	Daniel Bryan (c) (with Rowan) defeated Kevin Owens and Mustafa Ali by pinfall	Triple threat match for the WWE Championship	18:45
9	Becky Lynch defeated Charlotte Flair by disqualification	Singles match (Note: Since Lynch won, she was added back into the WWE Raw Women's Championship match at WrestleMania 35.)	8:45
10	The Shield (Dean Ambrose, Seth Rollins, and Roman Reigns) defeated Baron Corbin, Bobby Lashley, and Drew McIntyre by pinfall	Six-man tag team match	24:50
(c) / – the champion(s) heading into the match; P / – the match was broadcast on the pre-show
