= Starrcade =

Professional wrestling event series

- WWE Starrcade logo
- Created by: Dusty Rhodes, Jim Crockett Jr.
- Promotions: NWA (Governing body) (1983–1990); JCP (1983–1987); WCW (1988–2000); WWE (2017–2019)
- Brands: Raw (2018–2019); SmackDown (2017–2019)
- First event: 1983
- Last event: 2019

Starrcade was a recurring professional wrestling event, originally broadcast via closed-circuit television and eventually broadcast via pay-per-view. It was originally held from 1983 to 2000, first by the National Wrestling Alliance (NWA) from 1983 to 1990, with the 1983–1987 events specifically held by Jim Crockett Promotions (JCP) under the NWA, and then held by World Championship Wrestling (WCW) from 1988 to 2000.

Starrcade was regarded by the NWA and WCW as their flagship event of the year, much in the same vein that its rival, the World Wrestling Federation (WWF), regarded WrestleMania, which began two years after the first Starrcade. As a result, the buildup to each Starrcade featured the largest feuds of the promotion. In 2001, the WWF acquired WCW, and the WWF was renamed to World Wrestling Entertainment (WWE) in 2002.

WWE revived the event in 2017 as a house show with portions of the events in 2018 and 2019 airing as WWE Network specials. Due to the COVID-19 pandemic, an event was not held in 2020 and no further events were scheduled.

== History ==
From 1983 to 1987, Starrcade was produced by the National Wrestling Alliance's (NWA) Jim Crockett Promotions (JCP), the dominant promotion of the NWA, and aired on Thanksgiving Day. In 1987, the World Wrestling Federation (WWF) scheduled a pay-per-view (PPV) of their own, Survivor Series, on Thanksgiving night and demanded exclusivity from cable providers on carriage of the event. In order to prevent such a problem, Starrcade was moved to December the following year and the show was held around Christmas Day, mostly in the days following, beginning in 1988. Also in 1988, JCP was sold to Turner Broadcasting due to financial problems and became World Championship Wrestling (WCW), though Starrcade was held under the NWA banner until 1990.

From the 1960s to the 1980s, it was tradition for JCP to hold major professional wrestling events on Thanksgiving and Christmas, mostly at Greensboro Coliseum. In 1983, JCP created Starrcade as their supercard to continue the Thanksgiving tradition, and spread it across its territory on closed-circuit television. It popularized broadcasting on closed-circuit television and was financially successful. From 1987, Starrcade was broadcast on PPV, the first NWA event to do so.

Starrcade was held for the final time as a WCW event in 2000: the promotion would be acquired by the WWF in 2001, and the brand would become dormant. In 2002, the WWF was renamed to World Wrestling Entertainment (with its "WWE" abbreviation becoming an orphaned initialism in 2011). In 2017, WWE revived Starrcade for a SmackDown-branded non-televised house show on November 25, 2017. The following year, WWE's Starrcade house shows began to be held as WWE Network specials and featured both the Raw and SmackDown brands. An event did not occur in 2020 due to the COVID-19 pandemic, which prevented WWE from holding shows outside of its normal weekly television programming and PPVs. WWE resumed live touring in July 2021, but a Starrcade event was not scheduled for that year.

== Events ==
WCW/nWo co-branded event	SmackDown-branded event

#	Event	Date	City	Venue	Main event	Ref.
National Wrestling Alliance: Jim Crockett Promotions
1	Starrcade '83: A Flare for the Gold	November 24, 1983	Greensboro, North Carolina	Greensboro Coliseum	Harley Race (c) vs. Ric Flair in a steel cage match for the NWA World Heavyweight Championship with Gene Kiniski as the special guest referee	
2	Starrcade '84: The Million Dollar Challenge	November 22, 1984	Greensboro, North Carolina	Greensboro Coliseum	Ric Flair (c) vs. Dusty Rhodes for the NWA World Heavyweight Championship with Joe Frazier as the special guest referee	
3	Starrcade '85: The Gathering	November 28, 1985	Greensboro, North Carolina	Greensboro Coliseum	Ric Flair (c) vs. Dusty Rhodes for the NWA World Heavyweight Championship	
3	Starrcade '85: The Gathering	November 28, 1985	Atlanta, Georgia	The Omni	Ric Flair (c) vs. Dusty Rhodes for the NWA World Heavyweight Championship	
4	Starrcade '86: The Skywalkers	November 27, 1986	Greensboro, North Carolina	Greensboro Coliseum	Ric Flair (c) vs. Nikita Koloff for the NWA World Heavyweight Championship	
4	Starrcade '86: The Skywalkers	November 27, 1986	Atlanta, Georgia	The Omni	Ric Flair (c) vs. Nikita Koloff for the NWA World Heavyweight Championship	
5	Starrcade '87: Chi-Town Heat	November 26, 1987	Chicago, Illinois	UIC Pavilion	Ron Garvin (c) vs. Ric Flair in a steel cage match for the NWA World Heavyweight Championship	
National Wrestling Alliance: World Championship Wrestling
6	Starrcade '88: True Gritt	December 26, 1988	Norfolk, Virginia	Norfolk Scope	Ric Flair (c) vs. Lex Luger for the NWA World Heavyweight Championship	
7	Starrcade '89: Future Shock	December 13, 1989	Atlanta, Georgia	The Omni	Iron Man tournament - final: Ric Flair vs. Sting	
8	Starrcade '90: Collision Course	December 16, 1990	St. Louis, Missouri	Kiel Auditorium	Sting (c) vs. The Black Scorpion for the NWA World Heavyweight Championship with Dick the Bruiser as the special guest referee	
World Championship Wrestling (WCW)
9	Starrcade '91: Battlebowl – The Lethal Lottery	December 29, 1991	Norfolk, Virginia	Norfolk Scope	Battlebowl	
10	Starrcade '92: Battlebowl – The Lethal Lottery II	December 28, 1992	Atlanta, Georgia	The Omni	Battlebowl	
11	Starrcade '93: 10th Anniversary	December 27, 1993	Charlotte, North Carolina	Independence Arena	Vader (c) vs. Ric Flair in a Title vs. Career match for the WCW World Heavyweight Championship	
12	Starrcade '94: Triple Threat	December 27, 1994	Nashville, Tennessee	Nashville Municipal Auditorium	Hulk Hogan (c) vs. The Butcher for the WCW World Heavyweight Championship	
13	Starrcade '95: World Cup of Wrestling	December 27, 1995	Nashville, Tennessee	Nashville Municipal Auditorium	Randy Savage (c) vs. Ric Flair for the WCW World Heavyweight Championship	
14	Starrcade '96	December 29, 1996	Nashville, Tennessee	Nashville Municipal Auditorium	Hollywood Hogan vs. Roddy Piper	
15	Starrcade '97	December 28, 1997	Washington, D.C.	MCI Center	Hollywood Hogan (c) vs. Sting for the WCW World Heavyweight Championship	
16	Starrcade '98	December 27, 1998	Washington, D.C.	MCI Center	Goldberg (c) vs. Kevin Nash in a no disqualification match for the WCW World Heavyweight Championship	
17	Starrcade '99	December 19, 1999	Washington, D.C.	MCI Center	Bret Hart (c) vs. Goldberg in a no disqualification match for the WCW World Heavyweight Championship	
18	Starrcade (2000)	December 17, 2000	Washington, D.C.	MCI Center	Scott Steiner (c) vs. Sid Vicious for the WCW World Heavyweight Championship	
WWE
19	Starrcade (2017)	November 25, 2017	Greensboro, North Carolina	Greensboro Coliseum	AJ Styles (c) vs. Jinder Mahal in a steel cage match for the WWE Championship	
20	Starrcade (2018)	November 24, 2018	Cincinnati, Ohio	U.S. Bank Arena	AJ Styles vs. Samoa Joe in a steel cage match	
21	Starrcade (2019)	December 1, 2019	Duluth, Georgia	Infinite Energy Center	Kevin Owens vs. Bobby Lashley	

== 2017 ==
Starrcade
- Promotion: WWE
- Brand: SmackDown
- Date: November 25, 2017
- City: Greensboro, North Carolina
- Venue: Greensboro Coliseum Complex
- Attendance: 10,234
- Tagline: Starrcade Returns

Starrcade chronology
← Previous; 2000	Next → 2018

The 2017 Starrcade was the 19th Starrcade professional wrestling event. It was the first Starrcade promoted by WWE and was held exclusively for wrestlers from the promotion's SmackDown brand division as a non-televised house show. It took place on November 25, 2017, at the Greensboro Coliseum Complex in Greensboro, North Carolina. It was the first Starrcade event in seventeen years. It was also the first Starrcade event not to be televised in any way and the first to be held in the Greensboro Coliseum since 1985. The event featured appearances by Ric Flair, Arn Anderson, Ricky Steamboat, The Rock 'n' Roll Express, and The Hardy Boyz.

No.	Results	Stipulations
1	Bobby Roode defeated Dolph Ziggler	Singles match with Arn Anderson as special outside enforcer
2	Mike Kanellis, Rusev (with Aiden English), The Bludgeon Brothers (Harper and Rowan), and The Colóns (Primo and Epico) defeated Sin Cara, Tye Dillinger, Breezango (Tyler Breeze and Fandango), and The Ascension (Konnor and Viktor)	Twelve-man tag team match
3	Naomi defeated Tamina (with Lana)	Singles match
4	Dustin Rhodes defeated Dash Wilder	Singles match
5	Shinsuke Nakamura defeated Baron Corbin (c) by disqualification	Singles match for the WWE United States Championship
6	The Usos (Jimmy and Jey) (c) defeated The New Day (Kofi Kingston and Xavier Woods) (with Big E), Chad Gable and Shelton Benjamin, and Kevin Owens and Sami Zayn	Fatal 4-Way match for the WWE SmackDown Tag Team Championship
7	Charlotte Flair (c) defeated Natalya by submission	Steel Cage match for the WWE SmackDown Women's Championship
8	AJ Styles (c) defeated Jinder Mahal (with The Singh Brothers) by escaping the cage	Steel Cage match for the WWE Championship
(c) / – the champion(s) heading into the match
