= Survivor Series (2019) =

WWE pay-per-view and livestreaming event

- Promotional poster featuring Becky Lynch, Shayna Baszler, and Bayley
- Promotion: WWE
- Brand(s): Raw; SmackDown; NXT
- Date: November 24, 2019
- City: Rosemont, Illinois
- Venue: Allstate Arena
- Attendance: 13,271

WWE event chronology
← Previous; NXT TakeOver: WarGames	Next → Starrcade

Survivor Series chronology
← Previous; 2018	Next → 2020

The 2019 Survivor Series was a professional wrestling pay-per-view (PPV) and livestreaming event produced by WWE, held for wrestlers from the promotion's Raw, SmackDown, and NXT brand divisions. It was the 33rd annual Survivor Series and took place on November 24, 2019, at the Allstate Arena in the Chicago suburb of Rosemont, Illinois. The theme of the event was brand supremacy in which the majority of the matches on the card involved wrestlers from the three brands in direct competition, including the titular Survivor Series match, a tag team elimination match that pits teams of multiple wrestlers against each other.

Ten matches were contested at the event, including three on the Kickoff pre-show. The card was highlighted by two Survivor Series matches, and for the first and only time, they were contested as three-way matches: Team NXT won the women's match in the opening bout, while Team SmackDown won the men's match on the undercard. In the main event, NXT Women's Champion Shayna Baszler defeated Raw Women's Champion Becky Lynch and SmackDown Women's Champion Bayley in a non-title triple threat match. NXT won brand supremacy by winning four of the seven interbrand matches; SmackDown won two while Raw's sole win was on the pre-show. In what were the only non-interbrand matches on the card, all three of WWE's recognized men's world championships at the time were defended: Brock Lesnar retained Raw's WWE Championship against Rey Mysterio in a No Holds Barred match, "The Fiend" Bray Wyatt retained SmackDown's Universal Championship against Daniel Bryan, and Adam Cole retained the NXT Championship against Pete Dunne.

This was the second Survivor Series held at the Allstate Arena, after the 1989 event when it was known as the Rosemont Horizon. It was the first and only Survivor Series to include the NXT brand, along with the United Kingdom-based NXT UK, which was grouped under NXT, subsequently being the first main roster PPV and livestreaming event to feature the NXT brand proper. This was also the first Survivor Series since 2009 to feature three major brands.

== Production ==
=== Background ===
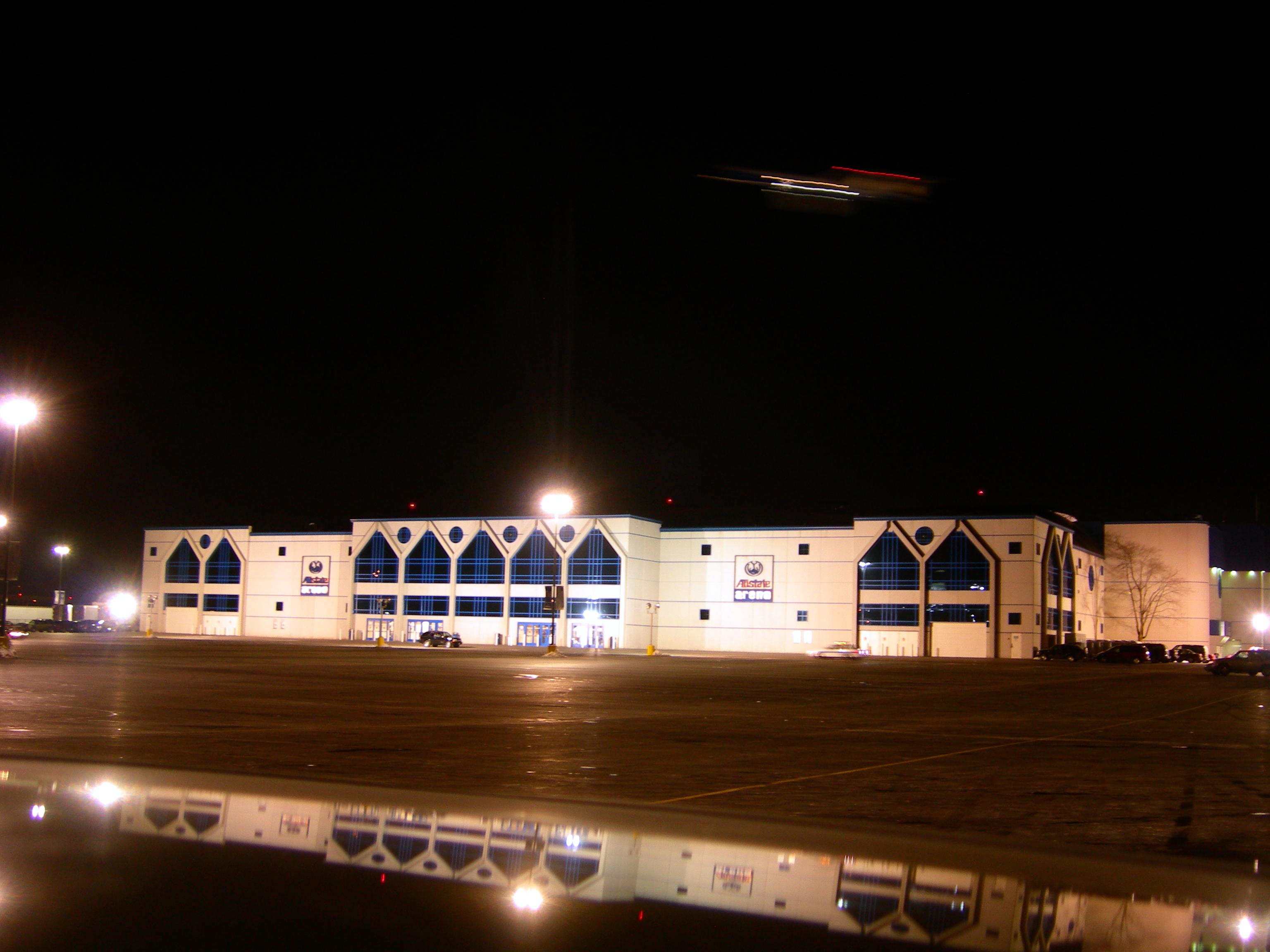
The 33rd annual Survivor Series was the second time for the event to be held at the Allstate Arena in the Chicago suburb of Rosemont, Illinois, after 1989 when it was known as the Rosemont Horizon (renamed in 1999).

Survivor Series is an annual professional wrestling event, produced every November by WWE since 1987, generally held around Thanksgiving in the United States. It was originally broadcast exclusively via pay-per-view (PPV) before it began simultaneously livestreaming on the WWE Network in 2014. In what has become the second longest-running PPV event in history (behind WWE's WrestleMania), it is one of the promotion's original four PPVs, along with WrestleMania, SummerSlam, and Royal Rumble, referred to as the "Big Four". The event is traditionally characterized by having Survivor Series matches, which are tag team elimination matches that typically pits teams of four or five wrestlers against each other. Announced on November 19, 2018, the 33rd Survivor Series was scheduled to be held on November 24, 2019, at the Allstate Arena in the Chicago suburb of Rosemont, Illinois, marking the second Survivor Series held at the venue after the 1989 event when it was known as the Rosemont Horizon (renamed in 1999).

Following the reintroduction of the brand split in July 2016, Survivor Series became centered around competition between wrestlers from Raw and SmackDown for brand supremacy. In addition to traditional Survivor Series matches between the brands, the champions of Raw faced their SmackDown counterparts in non-title matches, which began at the 2017 event. In September 2019, NXT, previously WWE's developmental brand, debuted on the USA Network, solidifying its status as WWE's third major brand, and was subsequently added to the 2019 event as part of the brand competition theme (wrestlers from the United Kingdom-based NXT UK also appeared and were grouped under the NXT umbrella). It was in turn the first Survivor Series to include NXT and the first since the 2009 event to feature a third major brand. Due to NXT's addition, it was the first Survivor Series to have three-way Survivor Series matches. It was subsequently the first main roster PPV and livestreaming event to feature the NXT brand proper.

With the exception of the men's top champions—as each brand's top championship was defended at the event—the 2019 Survivor Series featured the Raw, SmackDown, and NXT Women's Champions facing off, Raw's United States Champion, SmackDown's Intercontinental Champion, and NXT's North American Champion going against each other, and the Raw, SmackDown, and NXT Tag Team Champions in a triple threat tag team match. As the NXT Cruiserweight Championship was the only title of its kind in WWE, it was defended in a triple threat match against challengers of the opposing brands. During a media call for NXT TakeOver: WarGames, WWE Chief Operating Officer and NXT head Paul "Triple H" Levesque said that there were talks of doing a triple threat match between Raw's WWE Champion, SmackDown's Universal Champion, and the NXT Champion, but because of the storyline between WWE Champion Brock Lesnar and Rey Mysterio, they felt that their match needed to happen at this event. He also said that Universal Champion "The Fiend" Bray Wyatt worked better in his own storyline.

=== Storylines ===
The event comprised 10 matches, including three on the Kickoff pre-show, that resulted from scripted storylines. Results were predetermined by WWE's writers on the Raw, SmackDown, and NXT brands, while storylines were produced on WWE's weekly television shows, Monday Night Raw, Friday Night SmackDown, and Wednesday night's NXT.

==== World championship matches ====
On the September 30 episode of Raw, Brock Lesnar brutally attacked Rey Mysterio as well as Mysterio's son, Dominik, who was seated in the front row. After Lesnar won the WWE Championship during SmackDown's 20th Anniversary, an injured Mysterio appeared along with Dominic's godfather and Lesnar's former Ultimate Fighting Championship rival, Cain Velasquez, who attacked Lesnar. At Crown Jewel, Lesnar retained the championship against Velasquez by submission and continued to apply the Kimura Lock after the match had concluded until Mysterio attacked Lesnar with a chair. Lesnar fended off Mysterio, who retaliated by striking Lesnar with multiple chair shots, forcing him to retreat. On the following SmackDown, Lesnar quit SmackDown to move to Raw, taking the WWE Championship with him, in order to seek revenge against Mysterio, who had been drafted to Raw. On the following Raw, Lesnar proceeded to attack crew members in search of Mysterio, including commentator Dio Maddin, whom he put through the broadcast table with an F-5. Mysterio then appeared, struck Lesnar with a steel pipe, and later challenged Lesnar for the WWE Championship at Survivor Series, which was made official. On the November 18 episode of Raw, Lesnar's advocate Paul Heyman suggested a No Holds Barred match and Mysterio accepted.

At Crown Jewel, SmackDown wrestler "The Fiend" Bray Wyatt won Raw's Universal Championship, thus transferring the title to SmackDown. Backstage during the November 8 episode of SmackDown, as Sami Zayn was trying to convince Daniel Bryan to join his faction, "The Fiend" appeared and attacked Bryan with the Mandible Claw. During a "Miz TV" segment the following week, Wyatt, as his normal self, taunted Bryan by mocking the latter's former "Yes Movement" persona. In response, Bryan challenged Wyatt for the Universal Championship at Survivor Series and Wyatt accepted, but with Bryan facing Wyatt's alter-ego "The Fiend".

On November 19, Adam Cole was scheduled to defend the NXT Championship at Survivor Series. His opponent was determined by a triple threat match that occurred at TakeOver: WarGames the night before Survivor Series, where Pete Dunne defeated Damian Priest and Killian Dain to earn the title shot. This marked the first time that an NXT championship was to be defended on the main card of a Survivor Series event, as well as the main card of a main roster PPV and livestreaming event..

==== Champions brand supremacy matches ====
On the November 1 episode of SmackDown, after Bayley defeated Nikki Cross to retain the SmackDown Women's Championship due to interference from Sasha Banks, NXT Women's Champion Shayna Baszler appeared and attacked all three. During a sit-down interview on the following Raw, Charly Caruso informed Raw Women's Champion Becky Lynch that she would be facing Baszler and Bayley in a non-title triple threat match at Survivor Series, after which, Baszler appeared and confronted Lynch. Over the following weeks, the three would invade each others shows, attacking one another.

Prior to the November 6 episode of NXT, Raw's The O.C. (AJ Styles, Luke Gallows, and Karl Anderson) invaded NXT and attacked The Undisputed Era (Adam Cole, Bobby Fish, Kyle O'Reilly, and Roderick Strong). On the November 11 episode of Raw, a non-title triple threat match between United States Champion AJ Styles, Intercontinental Champion Shinsuke Nakamura, and North American Champion Roderick Strong was scheduled for Survivor Series.

On the November 4 episode of Raw, a non-title triple threat tag team match between Raw Tag Team Champions The Viking Raiders (Erik and Ivar), SmackDown Tag Team Champions The Revival (Scott Dawson and Dash Wilder), and NXT Tag Team Champions The Undisputed Era (Bobby Fish and Kyle O'Reilly) was scheduled for Survivor Series. However, on the November 8 episode of SmackDown, The New Day (Big E and Kofi Kingston) defeated The Revival to win the SmackDown Tag Team Championship, thus replacing them in the match. During a rematch the following week, The Undisputed Era invaded SmackDown and interfered, costing The Revival the match.

==== Survivor Series matches ====
On the November 8 episode of SmackDown, Michael Cole announced Sasha Banks as the captain of Team SmackDown for the women's Survivor Series match. Later that night, Carmella and Dana Brooke defeated Fire & Desire (Mandy Rose and Sonya Deville) to qualify for the team after the match had been rescheduled due to a backstage attack from NXT's Bianca Belair the previous week that led to Rhea Ripley and Tegan Nox defeating Fire & Desire. On November 14, WWE.com announced Lacey Evans as the fourth member of Team SmackDown, followed by Nikki Cross on November 17 after Cross, who was originally scheduled to face Bayley in a non-title qualifying match, scored the pin in an eight-woman tag team match on the November 15 episode of SmackDown. On the November 18 episode of Raw, Charlotte Flair was announced as the captain for Team Raw, with Natalya, Sarah Logan, and WWE Women's Tag Team Champions The Kabuki Warriors (Asuka and Kairi Sane) revealed as the other team members later that night. Following a tag team match that night in which Flair and Becky Lynch faced The IIconics (Billie Kay and Peyton Royce), the latter being disgruntled as they were not selected for Team Raw, NXT's Shayna Baszler, Marina Shafir, and Jessamyn Duke attacked the women. On the November 22 episode of SmackDown, Rhea Ripley was revealed as the captain for Team NXT. Later that night, Ripley defeated Flair and Banks in a triple threat match, and a brawl occurred with all the women from the three brands following the match. After the conclusion of TakeOver: WarGames, Ripley picked Candice LeRae, Bianca Belair, Io Shirai, and NXT UK's Toni Storm as the other members of Team NXT.

On November 8, WWE.com announced that Seth Rollins was selected as the captain of Team Raw for the men's Survivor Series match, with Kevin Owens, Ricochet, Randy Orton, and Drew McIntyre revealed as the other team members during the November 11 episode of Raw. On the November 12 episode of WWE Backstage, Roman Reigns was revealed as the captain for Team SmackDown, with Mustafa Ali (formerly known as Ali), Braun Strowman, King Corbin, and Shorty G also announced for the team. NXT head Triple H tried to convince Rollins as well as Owens to leave Raw and come back to NXT where they had started their WWE careers. Both turned down the offers, leading to the NXT roster attacking members of Raw, as well as those on SmackDown. At the conclusion of the November 18 episode of Raw, Triple H invited members of Raw and SmackDown to the following episode of NXT, where a large brawl broke out between all three brands. All the members of Raw, SmackDown, and NXT would brawl again following the conclusion of a six-man tag team match on the November 22 episode of SmackDown. Triple H, Shawn Michaels, and Road Dogg led the NXT roster in the invasion of SmackDown, reenacting how D-Generation X had attempted to invade World Championship Wrestling's Monday Nitro in 1998 with a tank. After the conclusion of TakeOver: WarGames, Triple H announced that Shawn Michaels would reveal the members of Team NXT during the Survivor Series Kickoff pre-show.

== Event ==
Other on-screen personnel
Role:	Name:
Commentators	Michael Cole (SmackDown/NXT title match)
Commentators	Corey Graves (SmackDown)
Commentators	Vic Joseph (Raw)
Commentators	Jerry Lawler (Raw)
Commentators	Nigel McGuinness (NXT)
Commentators	Beth Phoenix (NXT)
Commentators	Byron Saxton (Cruiserweight title match)
Commentators	Aiden English (Cruiserweight title match)
Spanish commentators	Carlos Cabrera
Spanish commentators	Marcelo Rodríguez
Russian commentators	Zhan Pomerantzev
Russian commentators	Morti Margolin
Russian commentators	Dimitri Guberniev
German commentators	Carsten Schaefer
German commentators	Tim Haber
German commentators	Calvin Knie
Ring announcers	Greg Hamilton (SmackDown)
Ring announcers	Mike Rome (Raw)
Ring announcers	Alicia Taylor (NXT)
Referees	Danilo Anfibio
Referees	Jason Ayers
Referees	John Cone
Referees	Dan Engler
Referees	Darrick Moore
Referees	Eddie Orengo
Referees	Chad Patton
Referees	Darryl Sharma
Referees	Ryan Tran
Referees	Drake Wuertz
Referees	Rod Zapata
Interviewers	Kayla Braxton
Interviewers	Sarah Schreiber
Interviewers	Cathy Kelley
Pre-show panel	Jonathan Coachman
Pre-show panel	Charly Caruso
Pre-show panel	David Otunga
Pre-show panel	Booker T
Pre-show panel	Shawn Michaels
Pre-show panel	Christian
Pre-show correspondents	Sam Roberts
Pre-show correspondents	John "Bradshaw" Layfield

=== Pre-show ===
Three matches occurred during the two-hour Survivor Series Kickoff pre-show, two of which were announced during the pre-show. In the first match, Dolph Ziggler and Robert Roode from SmackDown won an interbrand 10-man battle royal featuring tag teams from the three brands, lastly eliminating The Street Profits (Angelo Dawkins and Montez Ford) from Raw, giving SmackDown the first point of the night.

In the second pre-show match, NXT's Lio Rush defended the NXT Cruiserweight Championship in an interbrand triple threat match against Raw's Akira Tozawa and SmackDown's Kalisto. In the end, Rush performed a Final Hour on Kalisto to retain the title, giving NXT their first point.

The last match of the pre-show was the non-title triple threat match between the brands' tag team champions, Raw Tag Team Champions The Viking Raiders (Erik and Ivar), SmackDown Tag Team Champions The New Day (Big E and Kofi Kingston), and NXT Tag Team Champions The Undisputed Era (Bobby Fish and Kyle O'Reilly). The climax saw The Viking Raiders perform The Viking Experience on O'Reilly onto Fish and pin Fish, tying the brands at 1 point each.

Also during the Kickoff pre-show, Shawn Michaels revealed Tommaso Ciampa (as captain), Damian Priest, Keith Lee, Matt Riddle, and NXT UK's WWE United Kingdom Champion Walter as the members of Team NXT for the men's Survivor Series match.

=== Preliminary matches ===
The actual pay-per-view opened with the women's three-way Survivor Series match, featuring Team Raw (Charlotte Flair, Natalya, Sarah Logan, and WWE Women's Tag Team Champions Asuka and Kairi Sane) against Team SmackDown (Sasha Banks, Carmella, Dana Brooke, Lacey Evans, and Nikki Cross) against Team NXT (Rhea Ripley, Bianca Belair, Candice LeRae, Io Shirai, and NXT UK's Toni Storm). After a brawl, Shirai and LeRae were taken to the back for apparently sustaining injuries. The first elimination occurred when Belair trapped Cross in a roll up after Ripley had distracted the latter. Logan was next eliminated by Belair, who performed a 450 Splash on Logan. The next two women eliminated were Carmella who was pinned by a natural selection from Charlotte, shortly followed by Kairi Sane who was eliminated by a Meteora from Banks. Asuka eliminated Brooke after a kick. Flair and Asuka subsequently got into an altercation resulting in Asuka spitting green mist in Flair's face, who was then blinded and was eliminated by Evans after performing a Women's Right; Asuka also walked out of the match during this time, resulting in her elimination by forfeit. Evans was pinned by Natalya with a schoolboy, who then applied a dual submission alongside Banks to eliminate Storm. Belair was then eliminated by Banks after an assisted spinebuster/clothesline combo. Banks also took out Natalya with a punch, following a brief alliance against Ripley. Shirai and LeRae then returned, having feigned their injuries, and aided Ripley, who performed a Riptide on Banks to win the match for Team NXT, bringing NXT's score to 2 points with Raw and SmackDown at 1 point each.

Backstage, Team Raw's men's captain Seth Rollins questioned Kevin Owens's loyalty as Owens had appeared at NXT TakeOver: WarGames the previous night as the mystery partner for Tommaso Ciampa's team in the men's WarGames match. Owens assured Rollins that his loyalty was with Raw and that he had only participated in that match to get revenge on The Undisputed Era for attacking him on the previous episode of Raw. Owens then questioned Rollins's own loyalty, bringing up how Rollins had turned on his teammates in The Shield back in 2014.

Next was the non-title triple threat match between the brands' secondary champions, Raw's United States Champion AJ Styles, SmackDown's Intercontinental Champion Shinsuke Nakamura (accompanied by Sami Zayn), and NXT North American Champion Roderick Strong. In the closing moments, as Styles performed a Phenomenal Forearm on Nakamura, Strong threw Styles out of the ring and pinned Nakamura to win the match, bringing NXT's score to 3 points.

After that was the first of the three non-interbrand championship matches in which Adam Cole defended the NXT Championship against Pete Dunne. In the climax, Cole performed a Last Shot to the back of Dunne's head to retain the title.

The fourth match was SmackDown's world championship match where "The Fiend" Bray Wyatt defended the Universal Championship against Daniel Bryan. Bryan performed a Running Knee on The Fiend for a near-fall. Bryan performed Yes Kicks and three consecutive missile dropkicks on The Fiend. As Bryan went back to the top rope, The Fiend caught Bryan with the Mandible Claw submission, causing Bryan to pass out with The Fiend getting the pinfall victory to retain the title.

Next was the men's three-way Survivor Series match, featuring Team Raw (Seth Rollins, Drew McIntyre, Kevin Owens, Randy Orton, and Ricochet) against Team SmackDown (Roman Reigns, Braun Strowman, King Corbin, Mustafa Ali, and Shorty G) against Team NXT (Tommaso Ciampa, Damian Priest, Matt Riddle, Keith Lee, and NXT UK's WWE United Kingdom Champion Walter). McIntyre performed a Claymore Kick on Walter to eliminate him. Shorty G was then pinned by Owens after a frog splash. Ciampa performed a Spike DDT on Owens to eliminate him. Orton performed an RKO on Priest to eliminate him, before Riddle rolled up Orton to eliminate him. Riddle himself was then eliminated by Corbin after Orton performed an RKO on Riddle in anger. After a brawl outside the ring, Strowman was eliminated by countout. Corbin then performed End of Days on Ricochet to eliminate him. Ali was eliminated after a Stomp by Rollins. McIntyre was the next eliminated after a Spear from Reigns. Corbin was then eliminated after he received a Spear from teammate Reigns, and Ciampa pinned Corbin. Rollins and Reigns briefly teamed up and attempted to perform The Shield's signature powerbomb on Ciampa through an announce table, only for Lee to save Ciampa. Back in the ring, Rollins performed The Stomp on Ciampa to eliminate him followed by Lee eliminating Rollins with a fireman’s carry jackhammer. Lee performed the Spirit Bomb on Reigns for a near-fall. As Lee then attempted a moonsault, Reigns avoided Lee and performed a Spear to win the match as the sole survivor for Team SmackDown, bringing SmackDown's score to 2 points with NXT at 3 points and Raw at 1 point. Following the match, Reigns showed respect to Lee by offering him a fist bump which Lee accepted.

The penultimate match was for Raw's world championship, where Brock Lesnar (accompanied by Paul Heyman) defended the WWE Championship against Rey Mysterio in a No Holds Barred match. Despite Mysterio quickly exiting the ring at the start of the match to obtain a steel pipe, Lesnar stopped Mysterio from using it and dominated him. Mysterio's son Dominik ran to the ring with a towel in hand, pleading with Lesnar to stop the onslaught. As Lesnar was distracted, Mysterio attacked Lesnar with a low blow, followed by one from Dominik. The father and son then attacked Lesnar with a steel pipe and steel chair, respectively, and then performed double 619's and dual Frog Splashes on Lesnar for a near-fall. As they attempted additional Frog Splashes, Lesnar quickly grabbed Dominik and performed a German suplex on him. Lesnar then caught Mysterio in midair and performed an F-5 to retain the title.

=== Main event ===
The main event was the non-title triple threat match between the brands' women's champions, Raw Women's Champion Becky Lynch, SmackDown Women's Champion Bayley, and NXT Women's Champion Shayna Baszler. In the climax, as Lynch was down outside the ring, Bayley attempted a Diving Elbow Drop on Baszler, who caught her in the Kirifuda Clutch, forcing Bayley to submit to win the match. Baszler's win gave NXT the final point of the night to win brand supremacy at 4 points, where SmackDown had 2 points and Raw only had 1. Following the match, Lynch attacked Baszler and put her through the announce table.

== Aftermath ==
=== Raw ===
During the opening of the following night's Raw, Team Raw's men's captain Seth Rollins addressed the Raw locker room, who surrounded the ring, and criticized their poor performance at Survivor Series. In particular, Rollins singled out the performances of women's captain Charlotte Flair, Randy Orton, and Rey Mysterio (for not winning the WWE Championship as Brock Lesnar rarely appears), as well as AOP (Akam and Rezar) for not participating at all. Turning heel for the first time since 2016 and alienated by the comments, each wrestler gradually walked out. Rollins then addressed Kevin Owens, the last remaining wrestler at the ring. He again questioned Owens' loyalty to Raw, and accused Owens of lazily trying to be like himself. In response, Owens performed a stunner on Rollins and later challenged him to a match. During the match, AOP entered the ring. Owens slapped Akam, resulting in AOP attacking Owens, giving him a disqualification win. AOP then turned their attention to Rollins, who was ready to fight, but they instead left the ring. Rollins then performed two Stomps on Owens, teasing a heel turn for Rollins. The heel turn was finally executed on the December 9 episode, where Rollins performed "The Stomp" on Owens on the exposed concrete and aligned himself with AOP. After more months of feuding, Owens accepted Rollins' challenge for a match at WrestleMania 36.

WWE Champion Brock Lesnar and Paul Heyman made their first appearance since Survivor Series on the January 6, 2020, episode of Raw. There, Heyman announced that Lesnar would be entering the men's Royal Rumble match at the Royal Rumble as the number one entrant.

Also on Raw, a United States Championship match between AJ Styles and Humberto Carrillo was initially scheduled, only for Styles's O.C. teammates Luke Gallows and Karl Anderson to attack Carrillo from behind during his entrance, rendering him unable to compete. Ricochet, Drew McIntyre, Randy Orton, and Rey Mysterio then requested a title match. A fatal four-way match was contested to determine who would challenge Styles for the title that night. Mysterio won the fatal four-way match and subsequently defeated Styles to win the United States Championship for a second time, with help from Orton.

Due to the events that occurred between Charlotte Flair and Asuka during the women's Survivor Series match, a match between the two was scheduled on the following night's Raw, where Asuka pinned Flair after an assist from her tag team partner Kairi Sane and again spitting green mist in Flair's face. Flair would then lose to The Kabuki Warriors (Asuka and Sane) the following week. On the December 9 episode, Flair approached her former rival and Raw Women's Champion Becky Lynch, who defeated The Kabuki Warriors via disqualification, after which, they put Lynch through a table. Later that night, Lynch and Flair accepted The Kabuki Warriors' challenge for a Tables, Ladders, and Chairs match for the WWE Women's Tag Team Championship at TLC.

=== SmackDown ===
Team SmackDown's men's captain Roman Reigns opened the following SmackDown. Reigns thanked his SmackDown team, except King Corbin, whom he called out. Corbin claimed it was because of him that SmackDown won, and stated that Reigns betrayed his team when Reigns caused his elimination by attacking him. Reigns challenged Corbin to a match, however, Corbin instead brought out Dolph Ziggler and Robert Roode and Roode challenged Reigns instead, in which Reigns won. Following the match, a brawl ensued. This led to a Tables, Ladders, and Chairs match between Reigns and Corbin for TLC.

Also on the following SmackDown, Universal Champion "The Fiend" Bray Wyatt challenged Daniel Bryan, who was now embracing the Yes Movement again, to another match which Bryan accepted. The Fiend then attacked Bryan, ripping out his hair. He also debuted a new custom championship belt. The Miz was then intertwined in the feud, and at TLC, Wyatt, as his normal Firefly Fun House self, defeated Miz. After the match, a hooded figure attacked Wyatt and revealed himself as Bryan, with a buzz cut and a shorter beard. On the December 27 episode of SmackDown, Bryan won a triple threat match by submitting Miz to earn a rematch against The Fiend for the Universal Championship at the Royal Rumble, which was stipulated as a strap match.

SmackDown Women's Champion Bayley and Team SmackDown women's captain Sasha Banks stated they did not lose at Survivor Series because NXT was better, but because the rest of SmackDown let them down. Banks and Bayley criticized each member of Team SmackDown with Lacey Evans being last, who came out to confront them and delivered a Women's Right to Banks. After more weeks of feuding, Bayley was scheduled to defend the SmackDown Women's Championship against Evans at the Royal Rumble.

=== NXT ===
On the following NXT, the entire roster (including NXT UK) celebrated their brand's victory over Raw and SmackDown at Survivor Series only for The Undisputed Era to interrupt. Adam Cole stated that the only reason NXT won was due to their stable. Tommaso Ciampa reminded Cole that it was his team that defeated The Undisputed Era at WarGames and warned them that their days of holding their respective championships were numbered, with Ciampa focusing on Cole's NXT Championship. Finn Bálor then interrupted. In response, Ciampa issued a challenge to Bálor, which the latter agreed, and Bálor defeated Ciampa due to interference from Cole. Following the match, Bálor performed a Pele Kick on Cole. Bálor then defeated Ciampa and Keith Lee in a triple threat match to become the number one contender for Cole's NXT Championship.

Also on the following NXT, Rhea Ripley had a face-to-face confrontation with NXT Women's Champion Shayna Baszler, and congratulated her for defeating Raw Women's Champion Becky Lynch and SmackDown Women's Champion Bayley at Survivor Series. Ripley then reminded Baszler that her team defeated Baszler's team at WarGames and then issued a challenge to Baszler for her championship. The title match was then scheduled for the December 18 episode, where Ripley was victorious, ending Baszler's reign at 416 days.

Also on the following NXT, Lio Rush defeated Raw's Akira Tozawa to retain the NXT Cruiserweight Championship.

After Shayna Baszler lost the NXT Women's Championship, she reignited her feud with Raw Women's Champion Becky Lynch in 2020. At the Royal Rumble, Baszler entered as the final entrant in the women's Royal Rumble match and finished as the runner-up. After Lynch's successful title defense on the February 10 episode of Raw, Baszler viciously attacked Lynch. She then single-handedly eliminated all of the other opponents in the women's Elimination Chamber match at Elimination Chamber to earn a title match against Lynch at WrestleMania 36.

Although NXT had won brand supremacy for the 2019 Survivor Series, the brand was removed from the competition at the 2020 event. This was due to COVID-19-related issues, as outbreaks of the virus had occurred at both of NXT's home arenas, Full Sail University and then later, the WWE Performance Center, prompting WWE to exclude NXT wrestlers from the event to avoid potential transmission of the virus to members of the Raw and SmackDown rosters. The following year in September 2021, NXT was restructured as NXT 2.0 and reverted to being a developmental brand, thus excluding NXT from the 2021 event, which was also the final year for the brand supremacy theme.

== Results ==
No.	Results	Stipulations	Times
1^{P}	Dolph Ziggler and Robert Roode (SmackDown) won by last eliminating The Street Profits (Angelo Dawkins and Montez Ford) (Raw) (Note: Other teams by order of elimination: NXT's The Forgotten Sons (Steve Cutler and Wesley Blake), SmackDown's Lucha House Party (Gran Metalik and Lince Dorado), Raw's Curt Hawkins and Zack Ryder, NXT's Imperium (Fabian Aichner and Marcel Barthel), SmackDown's Heavy Machinery (Otis and Tucker), NXT's Breezango (Fandango and Tyler Breeze), SmackDown's The Revival (Dash Wilder and Scott Dawson), and Raw's The O.C. (Karl Anderson and Luke Gallows).)	10-team Interbrand Tag Team Battle Royal	8:20
2^{P}	Lio Rush (c) (NXT) defeated Akira Tozawa (Raw) and Kalisto (SmackDown) by pinfall	Interbrand Triple Threat match for the NXT Cruiserweight Championship	8:20
3^{P}	The Viking Raiders (Erik and Ivar) (Raw Tag Team Champions) defeated The New Day (Big E and Kofi Kingston) (SmackDown Tag Team Champions) and The Undisputed Era (Bobby Fish and Kyle O'Reilly) (NXT Tag Team Champions) by pinfall	Champions Triple Threat Tag team match	14:35
4	Team NXT (Rhea Ripley, Bianca Belair, Candice LeRae, Io Shirai, and Toni Storm) defeated Team Raw (Charlotte Flair, Natalya, Asuka, Kairi Sane, and Sarah Logan) and Team SmackDown (Sasha Banks, Carmella, Dana Brooke, Lacey Evans, and Nikki Cross)^{1}	5-on-5-on-5 Survivor Series Triple Threat match	28:00
5	Roderick Strong (NXT North American Champion) defeated AJ Styles (Raw's United States Champion) and Shinsuke Nakamura (SmackDown's Intercontinental Champion) (with Sami Zayn) by pinfall	Champions Triple Threat match	16:45
6	Adam Cole (c) defeated Pete Dunne by pinfall	Singles match for the NXT Championship	14:10
7	"The Fiend" Bray Wyatt (c) defeated Daniel Bryan by pinfall	Singles match for the WWE Universal Championship	10:10
8	Team SmackDown (Roman Reigns, Braun Strowman, King Corbin, Mustafa Ali, and Shorty G) defeated Team Raw (Seth Rollins, Drew McIntyre, Kevin Owens, Randy Orton, and Ricochet) and Team NXT (Tommaso Ciampa, Damian Priest, Matt Riddle, Keith Lee, and Walter)^{2}	5-on-5-on-5 Survivor Series Triple Threat match	31:00
9	Brock Lesnar (c) (with Paul Heyman) defeated Rey Mysterio by pinfall	No Holds Barred match for the WWE Championship	7:00
10	Shayna Baszler (NXT Women's Champion) defeated Becky Lynch (Raw Women's Champion) and Bayley (SmackDown Women's Champion) by submission	Champions Triple Threat match	18:10
(c) / – the champion(s) heading into the match; P / – the match was broadcast on the pre-show

=== Survivor Series matches ===
Team

– Raw
– SmackDown
– NXT

^1

Eliminated	Wrestler	Eliminated by	Method	Times
1	Nikki Cross	Bianca Belair	Pinfall	9:38
2	Sarah Logan	Bianca Belair	Pinfall	12:11
3	Carmella	Charlotte Flair	Pinfall	15:38
4	Kairi Sane	Sasha Banks	Pinfall	16:48
5	Dana Brooke	Asuka	Pinfall	17:25
6	Charlotte Flair	Lacey Evans	Pinfall	19:03
7	Asuka	N/A	Forfeit	19:08
8	Lacey Evans	Natalya	Pinfall	19:50
9	Toni Storm	Natalya and Sasha Banks	Submission	20:47
10	Bianca Belair	Sasha Banks	Pinfall	21:16
11	Natalya	Sasha Banks	Pinfall	21:58
12	Sasha Banks	Rhea Ripley	Pinfall	28:00
Survivor(s):	Candice LeRae, Io Shirai, and Rhea Ripley (Team NXT)			

^2

Eliminated	Wrestler	Eliminated by	Method	Times
1	Walter	Drew McIntyre	Claymore	2:57
2	Shorty G	Kevin Owens	Frog Splash	6:26
3	Kevin Owens	Tommaso Ciampa	Willow’s Bell	7:40
4	Damian Priest	Randy Orton	RKO	10:14
5	Randy Orton	Matt Riddle	Roll-up	10:28
6	Matt Riddle	King Corbin	RKO	10:52
7	Braun Strowman	N/A	Countout	13:14
8	Ricochet	King Corbin	End Of Days	14:30
9	Mustafa Ali	Seth Rollins	The Stomp	16:10
10	Drew McIntyre	Roman Reigns	Spear	17:37
11	King Corbin	Tommaso Ciampa	Spear	19:55
12	Tommaso Ciampa	Seth Rollins	The Stomp	25:37
13	Seth Rollins	Keith Lee	Spirit Bomb	28:11
14	Keith Lee	Roman Reigns	Spear	31:00
Sole Survivor:	Roman Reigns (Team SmackDown)			
