= WWE The Shield's Final Chapter =

2019 WWE Network event

The Shield's Final Chapter
- Promotional poster featuring The Shield (Seth Rollins, Dean Ambrose, and Roman Reigns)
- Promotion: WWE
- Brand(s): Raw; SmackDown; 205 Live
- Date: April 21, 2019
- City: Moline, Illinois
- Venue: TaxSlayer Center

WWE event chronology
← Previous; WrestleMania 35	Next → Money in the Bank

WWE Network specials chronology
← Previous; Starrcade	Next → Smackville

The Shield's Final Chapter was a 2019 professional wrestling livestreaming event produced by WWE, held for wrestlers from the promotion's main roster brands, Raw, SmackDown, and 205 Live. It took place on April 21, 2019, at TaxSlayer Center in Moline, Illinois with a portion of it airing as a one-hour WWE Network special. It was the fifth of seven originally scheduled house shows to broadcast as a WWE Network special. The event marked the final match for The Shield (Dean Ambrose, Roman Reigns, and Seth Rollins) as a group, as well as Ambrose's final match in WWE, as he subsequently joined rival company All Elite Wrestling the following month under the ring name Jon Moxley.

Seven matches were contested on the card, three of which were shown for the one-hour WWE Network special. In the main event, The Shield defeated Baron Corbin, Bobby Lashley, and Drew McIntyre in a six-man tag team match.

== Production ==
=== Background ===
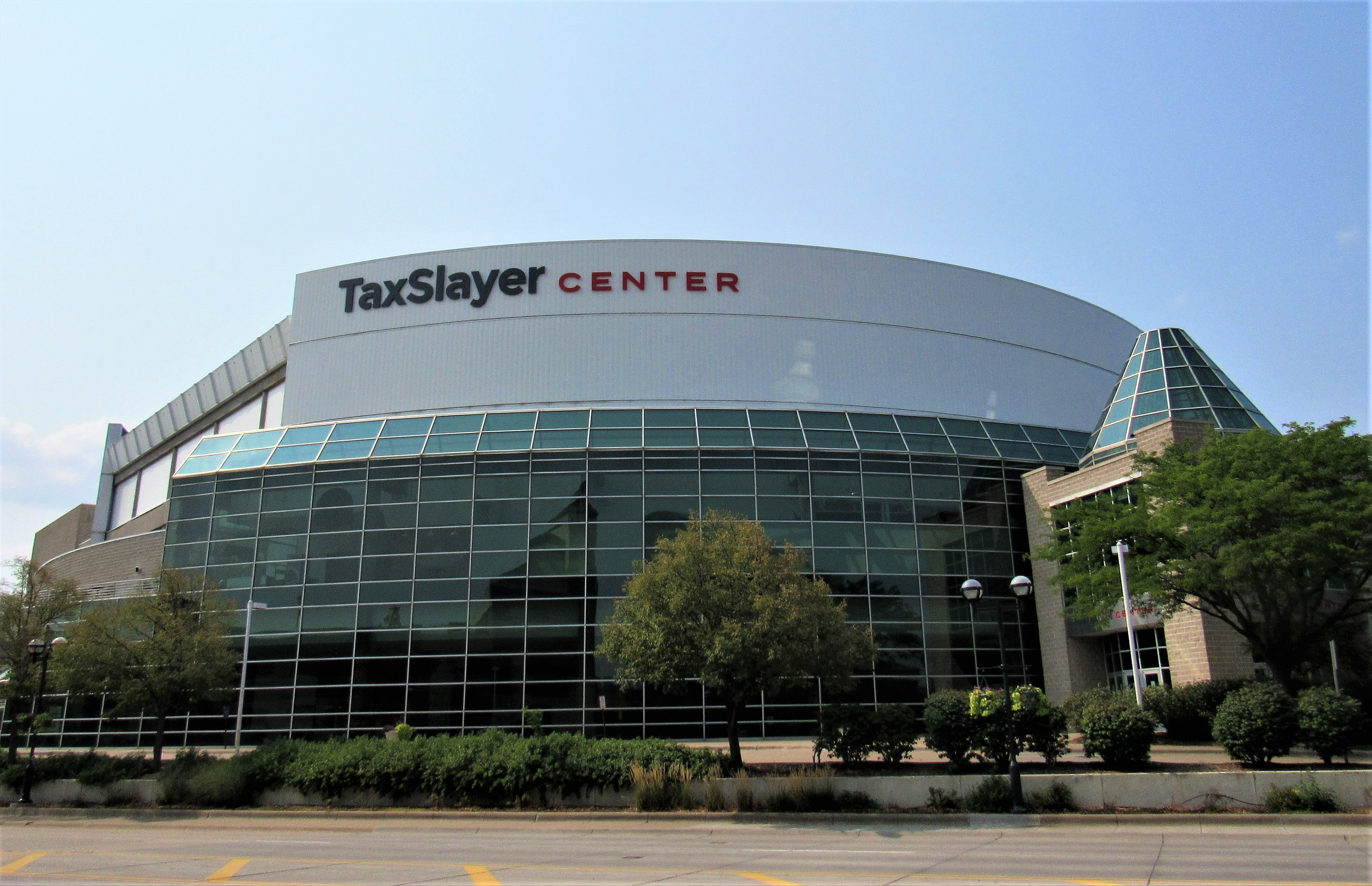
The event was held at the TaxSlayer Center in Moline, Illinois.

In 2015, the American professional wrestling promotion WWE began to expand its content on the WWE Network by broadcasting originally scheduled house shows, which are non-televised events. The first three events showed the majority of the card, but beginning with Starrcade in November 2018, only a portion of the card was broadcast as a one-hour WWE Network-exclusive special. The Shield's Final Chapter took place on April 21, 2019, at TaxSlayer Center in Moline, Illinois and featured wrestlers from the Raw, SmackDown, and 205 Live brand divisions. The final hour of the event was livestreamed on the WWE Network, and it was the fifth originally scheduled house show to broadcast as a WWE Network special, after The Beast in the East in July 2015, Live from Madison Square Garden in October 2015, Roadblock in March 2016, and Starrcade in November 2018.

=== Storylines ===
The event comprised a total of seven matches, three of which were shown for the one-hour WWE Network special. Results were predetermined by WWE's writers on the Raw, SmackDown, and 205 Live brands, while storylines were produced on WWE's weekly television shows, Monday Night Raw, SmackDown Live, and the cruiserweight-exclusive 205 Live.

On January 29, 2019, WWE confirmed that Dean Ambrose had decided to not renew his contract that was expiring in April. The following month, Roman Reigns, who took time off in October 2018 due to leukemia, returned. Ambrose, Reigns, and Seth Rollins then reunited The Shield for a match at Fastlane, where they defeated the team of Baron Corbin, Bobby Lashley, and Drew McIntyre. Although this had been promoted as The Shield's final match, one further match was scheduled for the WWE Network special, which featured both The Shield as a group and Ambrose's final match in WWE. The match was the main event of The Shield's Final Chapter.

== Event ==
Other on-screen personnel
Role:	Name:
Commentators	Michael Cole
Commentators	Corey Graves
Commentators	Renee Young
Ring announcer	Mike Rome
Referees	Chad Patton
Referees	Rod Zapata

=== Dark matches ===
Before the event aired live on the WWE Network, Zack Ryder and Curt Hawkins defeated The Revival (Scott Dawson and Dash Wilder) and Aleister Black and Ricochet in a triple threat tag team match to retain the Raw Tag Team Championship, Tony Nese defeated Buddy Murphy to retain the WWE Cruiserweight Championship, a six-man tag team match pitting Lucha House Party (Gran Metalik, Kalisto, and Lince Dorado) against Jinder Mahal and The Singh Brothers (Sunil Singh and Samir Singh) ended in a no contest, and Alexa Bliss and Lacey Evans defeated Dana Brooke and Nikki Cross in a tag team match.

=== Televised matches ===
The first televised match featured Finn Bálor defending the Intercontinental Championship against Elias. In the end, Elias tried to send Bálor off the ring apron through an announce table, but Bálor countered into a sunset flip for a nearfall. Bálor pinned Elias with a small package to win the match.

In the second televised match, Bayley and Ember Moon took on The Riott Squad (Ruby Riott and Sarah Logan) (accompanied by Liv Morgan). In the end, Riott attempted to pin Moon while using the ropes for leverage and Morgan tried to add leverage from the apron, but the referee saw it and ejected Morgan from ringside. Moon then performed the Eclipse on a distracted Riott to win the match.

In the final match, The Shield (Roman Reigns, Seth Rollins, and Dean Ambrose) took on Baron Corbin, Drew McIntyre, and Bobby Lashley. In the climax, Ambrose performed an elbow drop on Lashley, but McIntyre broke up the pin. Reigns performed a Spear on Lashley. Rollins performed The Stomp on McIntyre. Ambrose performed Dirty Deeds on Corbin before tagging in Reigns, who tagged in Rollins. The Shield performed the Triple Powerbomb on Corbin, and Rollins pinned him to win the match for The Shield. After the match, The Shield gave a heartfelt speech to the crowd about how much they have accomplished, and they performed their signature fistbump one more time as the event ended.

== Results ==
No.	Results	Stipulations	Times
1^{D}	Zack Ryder and Curt Hawkins (c) defeated The Revival (Scott Dawson and Dash Wilder) and Aleister Black and Ricochet by pinfall	Triple threat tag team match for the WWE Raw Tag Team Championship	—
2^{D}	Tony Nese (c) defeated Buddy Murphy by pinfall	Singles match for the WWE Cruiserweight Championship	—
3^{D}	Lucha House Party (Gran Metalik, Kalisto, and Lince Dorado) vs. Jinder Mahal and The Singh Brothers (Sunil Singh and Samir Singh) ended in a no contest	Six-man tag team match	—
4^{D}	Alexa Bliss and Lacey Evans defeated Dana Brooke and Nikki Cross by pinfall	Tag team match	—
5	Finn Bálor (c) defeated Elias by pinfall	Singles match for the WWE Intercontinental Championship	6:35
6	Bayley and Ember Moon defeated The Riott Squad (Ruby Riott and Sarah Logan) (with Liv Morgan) by pinfall	Tag team match	7:15
7	The Shield (Dean Ambrose, Seth Rollins, and Roman Reigns) defeated Baron Corbin, Bobby Lashley, and Drew McIntyre by pinfall	Six-man tag team match	14:25
(c) / – the champion(s) heading into the match; D / – this was a dark match
