= Starrcade (2018) =

WWE Network event

- Promotional poster featuring various WWE wrestlers
- Promotion: WWE
- Brand(s): Raw; SmackDown
- Date: November 24, 2018 (aired November 25, 2018)
- City: Cincinnati, Ohio
- Venue: U.S. Bank Arena
- Attendance: 7,500

WWE event chronology
← Previous; Survivor Series	Next → TLC: Tables, Ladders & Chairs

Starrcade chronology
← Previous; 2017	Next → 2019

WWE Network specials chronology
← Previous; Roadblock	Next → The Shield's Final Chapter

The 2018 Starrcade was a professional wrestling streaming event produced by WWE, held for wrestlers from the promotion's main roster brands, Raw and SmackDown. It was WWE's second annual Starrcade and 20th overall. The event took place on November 24, 2018, at the U.S. Bank Arena in Cincinnati, Ohio, with a portion of it airing on November 25 as a one-hour WWE Network special. The event included a special appearance from WWE Hall of Famer Ric Flair. This was the fourth of seven originally scheduled house shows to broadcast as a WWE Network special and it was the first Starrcade to be televised since the former World Championship Wrestling's final edition in 2000 as WWE's first event in 2017 was not televised.

Eleven matches were contested on the card, four of which were shown for the one-hour WWE Network special. In the main event of the non-televised live show, Seth Rollins defeated Dean Ambrose in a Steel Cage match to retain Raw's Intercontinental Championship. In the main event of the televised portion of the show, AJ Styles defeated Samoa Joe in another Steel Cage match.

== Production ==
=== Background ===
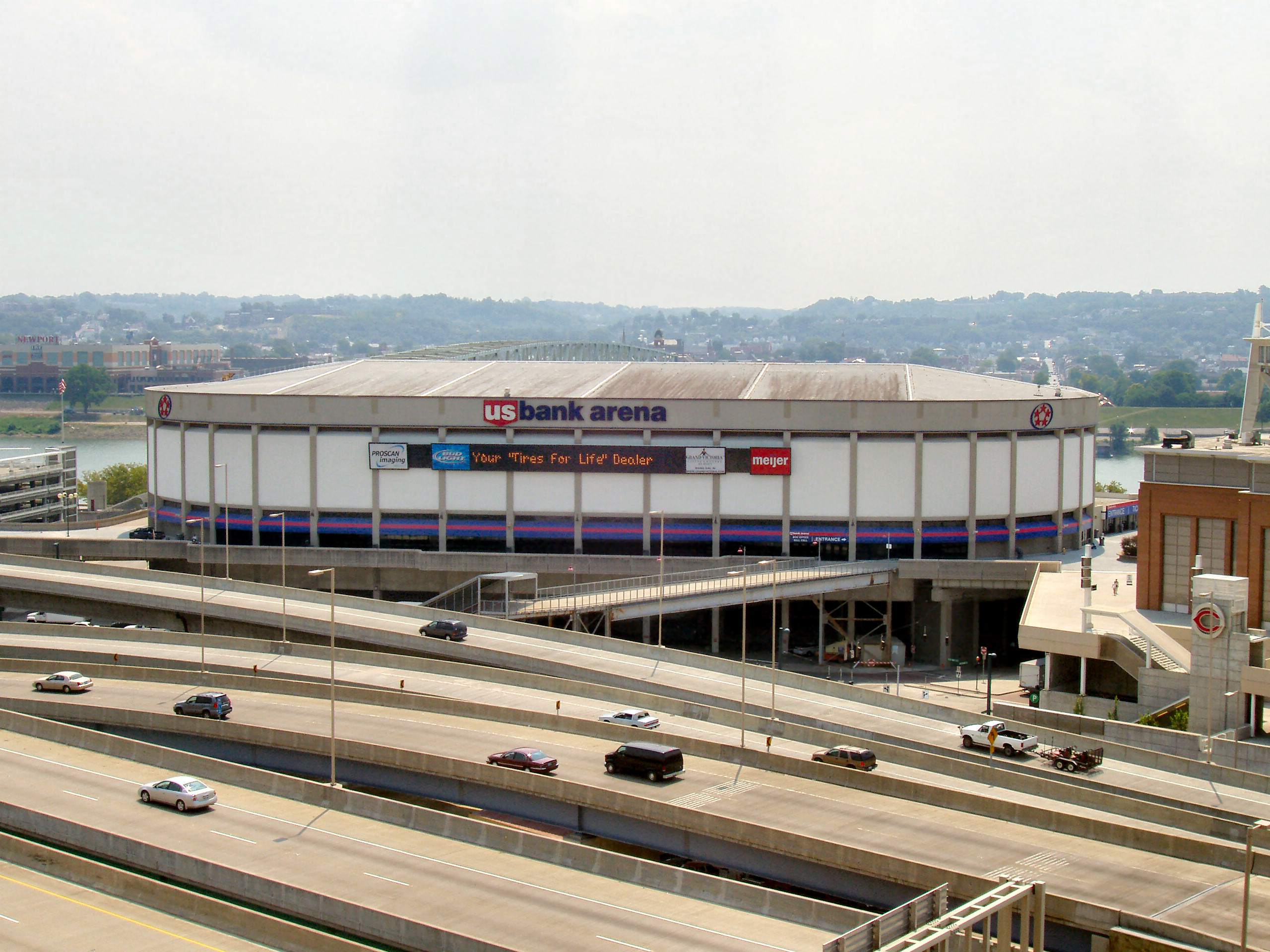
WWE's second annual Starrcade was held at the U.S. Bank Arena in Cincinnati, Ohio.

Starrcade was a live closed-circuit event that was conceived in 1983 by Dusty Rhodes. The event was originally held every November and was produced under the National Wrestling Alliance (NWA) banner by NWA member Jim Crockett Promotions (JCP). The NWA and JCP regarded Starrcade as their flagship event of the year, much in the same vein that its rival, the World Wrestling Federation (WWF), would begin to regard WrestleMania two years later. In 1987, the event began broadcasting on pay-per-view (PPV) and in 1988, JCP was sold to Turner Broadcasting and became World Championship Wrestling (WCW), with Starrcade being held as WCW's annual December PPV from 1988 until 2000; WCW and its assets were acquired by the WWF the following year (the WWF itself was renamed to WWE in 2002).

After a 17-year hiatus, WWE reinstated Starrcade as a house show, a non-televised event, and returned it to November, scheduled for November 25, 2017, held exclusively for wrestlers from the promotion's SmackDown brand division. On September 17, 2018, WWE revealed that a second Starrcade event, featuring both the Raw and SmackDown brands, would again be held as a house show on Saturday, November 24 at the U.S. Bank Arena in Cincinnati, Ohio. On November 16, however, it was announced that unlike the previous year, a portion of the 2018 event would be taped to air on November 25 as a one-hour WWE Network special, which made it the first Starrcade to be televised since WCW's final edition in 2000. It was the fourth originally scheduled house show to broadcast as a WWE Network special, after The Beast in the East in July 2015, Live from Madison Square Garden in October 2015, and Roadblock in March 2016.

=== Storylines ===
Other on-screen personnel
Role	Name
Commentators	Tom Phillips
Commentators	Byron Saxton
Ring announcers	Greg Hamilton
Referees	Chad Patton
Referees	Rod Zapata

Starrcade consisted of 11 professional wrestling matches, four of which aired on the WWE Network special, that involved various different wrestlers from pre-existing scripted feuds and storylines. Results were predetermined by WWE's writers on the Raw and SmackDown brands, while storylines were produced on WWE's weekly television shows, Monday Night Raw and SmackDown Live.

On the August 7 episode of SmackDown, The New Day (Big E and Kofi Kingston) defeated The Bar (Cesaro and Sheamus) to become the number one contenders for The Bludgeon Brothers's (Harper and Rowan) SmackDown Tag Team Championship at SummerSlam, where The New Day won by disqualification, but did not win the title as titles do not change hands by disqualification unless stipulated. The New Day captured the championship on the following episode of SmackDown and retained them at Hell in a Cell. On October 16 at SmackDown 1000, The Bar defeated The New Day to win the championship. A rematch was later scheduled for Starrcade.

At SummerSlam during the WWE Championship match between AJ Styles and Samoa Joe, Joe taunted Styles by disrespecting his wife and daughter, who were in attendance. An irate Styles attacked Joe with a steel chair, resulting in Joe winning by disqualification, but Styles retaining the title. On August 24, a rematch between the two for the title was scheduled for Hell in a Cell. At the event, Styles countered Joe's "Coquina Clutch" into a pin to retain the championship, despite Styles tapping out to the "Coquina Clutch" which the referee did not see. After the match, Joe attacked Styles. An irate Joe demanded a rematch with Styles. SmackDown General Manager Paige agreed and scheduled a third match between the two for the title at Super Show-Down, which Styles won. Styles again retained the title against Joe at Crown Jewel. A fifth encounter between the two, this time as a Steel Cage match, was later scheduled for Starrcade.

At SummerSlam, Charlotte Flair defeated Becky Lynch and Carmella in a triple threat match to capture the SmackDown Women's Championship. After the match, Lynch attacked Flair, thus turning heel in the process. Throughout following weeks, the two attacked each other. At Hell in a Cell, Lynch defeated Flair to win the championship. A rematch was later scheduled for Starrcade. On November 22, Lynch was replaced in the match by Asuka after suffering a legitimate facial injury.

On October 16 at SmackDown 1000, Rey Mysterio competed in his first WWE singles match since 2014, where he defeated United States Champion Shinsuke Nakamura in a non-title WWE World Cup qualifying match. A rematch for the United States Championship was later scheduled for Starrcade.

On the October 22 episode of Raw, after Seth Rollins and Dean Ambrose captured the Raw Tag Team Championship from Dolph Ziggler and Drew McIntyre, Ambrose suddenly attacked Rollins, turning heel. Two weeks later on Raw, Ambrose proceeded to attack Rollins again, after the latter lost the title in a handicap match against AOP (Akam and Rezar). The following week, Ambrose burned his Shield gear and explained that being part of the group had made him weak. After Rollins defeated Shinsuke Nakamura at Survivor Series, it was announced that Rollins would defend the Intercontinental Championship against Ambrose in a Street Fight at Starrcade. On November 22, it was announced that their bout would instead be a Steel Cage match.

== Results ==
No.	Results	Stipulations	Times
1	Bayley, Dana Brooke, Ember Moon, and Sasha Banks defeated Alicia Fox, Mickie James, Nia Jax, and Tamina by submission	Eight-woman tag team match	6:50
2^{D}	Drew McIntyre (with Dolph Ziggler) defeated Finn Bálor	Singles match	15:28
3^{D}	The B-Team (Bo Dallas and Curtis Axel) defeated The Revival (Dash Wilder and Scott Dawson)	Tag team match	10:36
4^{D}	The Bar (Cesaro and Sheamus) (c) defeated The New Day (Big E and Kofi Kingston) (with Xavier Woods)	Tag team match for the WWE SmackDown Tag Team Championship	18:20
5^{D}	Bray Wyatt defeated Baron Corbin	Singles match	2:44
6^{D}	Bray Wyatt defeated Baron Corbin	No Disqualification match	13:43
7^{D}	Charlotte Flair defeated Asuka by pinfall	Singles match	14:55
8	Rey Mysterio defeated Shinsuke Nakamura (c) by disqualification	Singles match for the WWE United States Championship	2:11
9	Rey Mysterio and Rusev (with Lana) defeated The Miz and Shinsuke Nakamura by pinfall	Tag team match	6:10
10	AJ Styles defeated Samoa Joe by submission	Steel Cage match	11:58
11^{D}	Seth Rollins (c) defeated Dean Ambrose by escaping the cage	Steel Cage match for the WWE Intercontinental Championship	12:58
(c) / – the champion(s) heading into the match; D / – this was a dark match
