= Money in the Bank (2019) =

WWE pay-per-view and livestreaming event

- Promotional poster featuring Becky Lynch
- Promotion: WWE
- Brand(s): Raw; SmackDown; 205 Live
- Date: May 19, 2019
- City: Hartford, Connecticut
- Venue: XL Center
- Attendance: 15,700

WWE event chronology
← Previous; The Shield's Final Chapter	Next → NXT TakeOver: XXV

Money in the Bank chronology
← Previous; 2018	Next → 2020

The 2019 Money in the Bank was a professional wrestling pay-per-view (PPV) and livestreaming event produced by WWE, held for wrestlers from the promotion's main roster brands, Raw, SmackDown, and 205 Live. It was the 10th annual Money in the Bank event and took place on May 19, 2019, at the XL Center in Hartford, Connecticut, which was the first held in May. The event centered on the Money in the Bank ladder match, a multi-person ladder match where the wrestlers compete to retrieve a briefcase hanging above the ring which contains a contract for a guaranteed world championship match at any time within the next year.

Twelve matches were contested at the event, including one on the Kickoff pre-show. While the contracts in the 2018 ladder matches granted world championship matches of the men's and women's winners respective brand, the 2019 contracts changed it to give the respective winners the choice of which title to challenge for. The main event was the men's ladder match, which was won by unannounced entrant Brock Lesnar from Raw. The women's match, which was the opening bout, was won by SmackDown's Bayley, who later that night cashed in the contract to win the SmackDown Women's Championship from Charlotte Flair, who herself had just won the title from Becky Lynch. In her other title defense, Lynch retained the Raw Women's Championship against Lacey Evans. In other prominent matches, Kofi Kingston defeated Kevin Owens to retain SmackDown's WWE Championship, while Seth Rollins defeated AJ Styles to retain Raw's Universal Championship.

== Production ==
=== Background ===
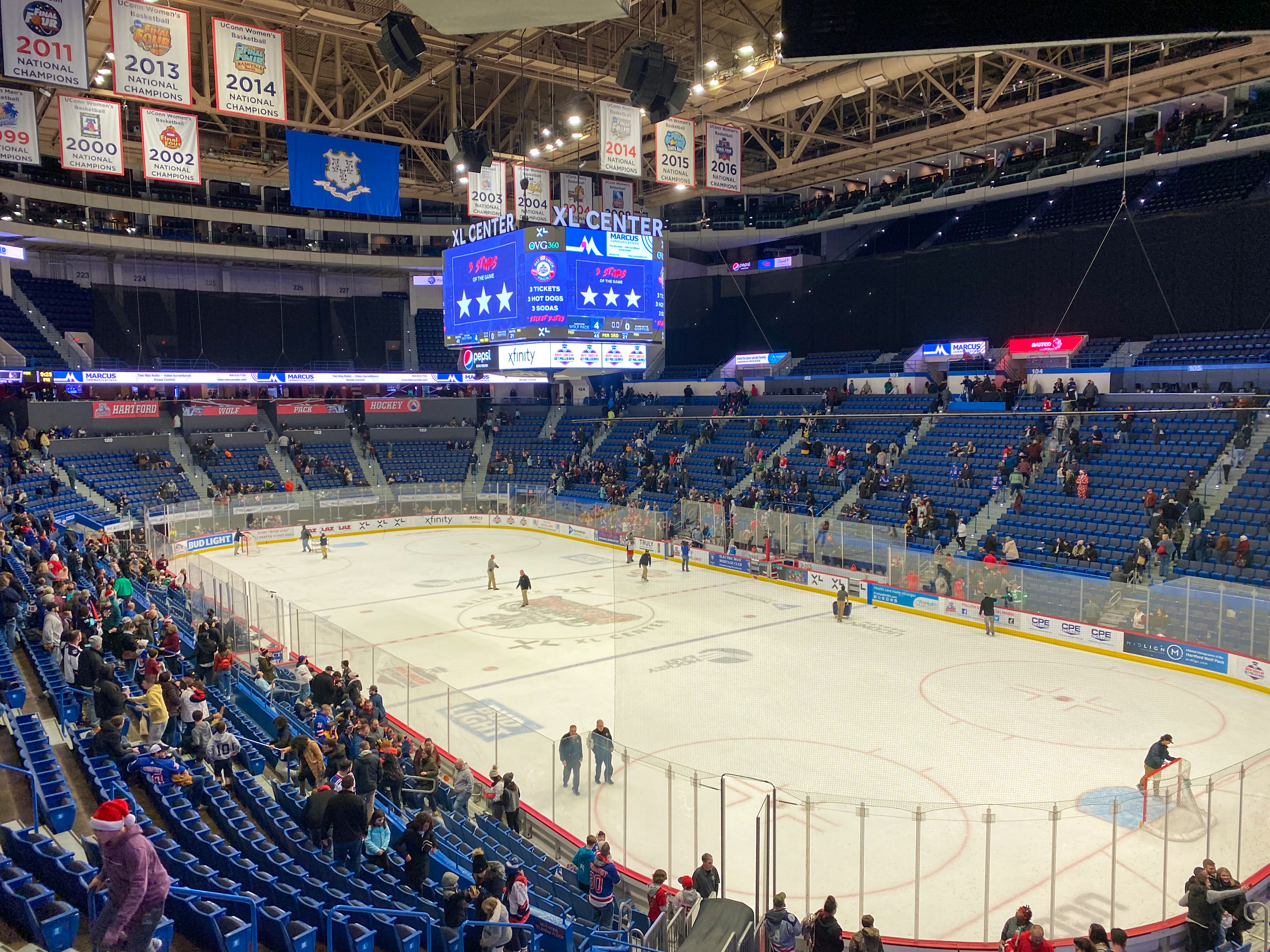
The 10th annual Money in the Bank event was held at the XL Center in Hartford, Connecticut.

Money in the Bank is an annual professional wrestling event produced by WWE since 2010, which at the time was generally held between June and July. It was originally broadcast exclusively via pay-per-view (PPV) before it began simultaneously livestreaming on the WWE Network in 2014. The concept of the event comes from WWE's established Money in the Bank ladder match. Announced on March 4, 2019, the 10th Money in the Bank event was scheduled to take place on May 19, 2019, at the XL Center in Hartford, Connecticut, marking the first Money in the Bank held in May. It featured wrestlers from the Raw, SmackDown, and 205 Live brands—the only to feature 205 Live. Tickets went on sale on March 8.

The Money in the Bank ladder match features multiple wrestlers using ladders to retrieve a briefcase hanging above the ring. The briefcase contains a contract that guarantees the winner a match for a world championship at any time within the next year. While the briefcases at the 2018 event contained contracts that guaranteed the respective men's and women's winners a match for a world championship of their respective brand at any time within the next year, the 2019 contracts allowed the winners the choice of either brands's world championships. Each ladder match featured eight wrestlers, evenly divided between participants from Raw and SmackDown. Male wrestlers competed for a contract to grant them a match for either Raw's Universal Championship or SmackDown's WWE Championship, while female wrestlers competed for a Raw Women's Championship or SmackDown Women's Championship match contract.

=== Storylines ===
The event comprised 12 matches, including one on the Kickoff pre-show, that resulted from scripted storylines. Results were predetermined by WWE's writers on the Raw, SmackDown, and 205 Live brands, while storylines were produced on WWE's weekly television shows, Monday Night Raw, SmackDown Live, and the cruiserweight-exclusive 205 Live.

At WrestleMania 35, Becky Lynch defeated Ronda Rousey and Charlotte Flair in a winner takes all triple threat match to win both the Raw and SmackDown Women's Championships. She was then double-booked to defend both championships at Money in the Bank. For the Raw Women's Championship, NXT call-up Lacey Evans attacked the double champion on both Raw and SmackDown following WrestleMania. Evans was subsequently drafted to Raw during the Superstar Shake-up and defeated Natalya to earn a Raw Women's Championship match. For the SmackDown Women's Championship, former champion Charlotte Flair took offense that she lost her title despite not being the one who was pinned at WrestleMania. Lynch exclaimed that she would not freely give Flair a rematch and demanded new challengers. Among the named challengers was new SmackDown draftee Bayley. Flair then defeated Bayley to earn a SmackDown Women's Championship match.

On the April 22 episode of Raw, Chief Operating Officer Paul "Triple H" Levesque scheduled two triple threat matches with the winners facing each other to determine Seth Rollins's next challenger for the Universal Championship. New Raw draftee AJ Styles defeated fellow draftees Rey Mysterio and Samoa Joe in the first triple threat match, while Baron Corbin defeated Drew McIntyre and new draftee The Miz in the second. Styles then defeated Corbin to earn a Universal Championship match against Rollins at Money in the Bank.

On the April 16 episode of SmackDown, WWE Chairman and Chied Executive Officer Vince McMahon introduced Elias as "the biggest acquisition in SmackDown history". Both were then interrupted by fellow new draftee Roman Reigns, who attacked Elias and performed a superman punch on Mr. McMahon. The following week, Shane McMahon challenged Reigns to a fight for attacking his father. Reigns came out and was attacked from behind by Elias, who assisted Shane in beating up Reigns. Elias then challenged Reigns to a match at Money in the Bank and Reigns accepted.

During "A Moment of Bliss" on the April 29 episode of Raw, Alexa Bliss revealed Raw's four participants for the men's Money in the Bank ladder match: Braun Strowman, new draftee Ricochet, Drew McIntyre, and Baron Corbin. On SmackDown the next night, SmackDown's four participants were revealed: Ali, new draftee Finn Bálor, Andrade, and Randy Orton. On Raw the following week, Robert Roode (formerly Bobby Roode) had the chance to replace Ricochet in the ladder match if he could defeat Ricochet, but was unsuccessful. Sami Zayn then defeated Strowman in a falls count anywhere match on the May 13 episode of Raw after interference from Corbin and McIntyre, taking Strowman's spot.

The four participants from Raw in the women's Money in the Bank ladder match were also revealed by Alexa Bliss during a separate "A Moment of Bliss" segment on the April 29 episode of Raw: Natalya, Dana Brooke, new draftee Naomi, and Bliss herself. SmackDown's four participants were revealed on the following night's episode of SmackDown: Bayley, Mandy Rose, new draftee Ember Moon, and Carmella. On the May 13 episode of Raw, Bliss, who had lost her luggage, was replaced by new draftee Nikki Cross in a fatal four-way match between Raw's four participants. Cross won the match and later replaced Bliss in the ladder match as Bliss was not medically cleared to compete.

At WrestleMania 35, Shane McMahon defeated The Miz in a falls count anywhere match; during the match, Shane attacked Miz's father. Miz was then drafted to Raw during the Superstar Shake-up and attacked Shane as retribution. On the April 29 episode of Raw, during Miz's match against Bobby Lashley, Shane distracted Miz, causing him to lose, leading to a brawl. Later, Miz challenged Shane to a Steel Cage match at Money in the Bank and Shane accepted.

On the April 16 episode of SmackDown, New Day members Kofi Kingston and Xavier Woods were guests on "The KO Show" where host Kevin Owens congratulated Kingston for winning the WWE Championship by defeating Daniel Bryan at WrestleMania 35. With fellow New Day member Big E out with injury, Owens wanted to join New Day as their third member. Kingston and Woods accepted "Big O" as an honorary member and the three won a six-man tag team match later that night. The following week, after Rusev attacked Kingston during his match with Shinsuke Nakamura, a brawl broke out also involving Woods and Owens. Owens then turned on Kingston and attacked him and Woods, proclaiming that he wanted the WWE Championship. Kingston then challenged Owens to a match at Money in the Bank with his title on the line and Owens accepted.

At WrestleMania 35, Samoa Joe defeated Rey Mysterio in one minute to retain the United States Championship. Both were then drafted to Raw in the Superstar Shake-up, and Mysterio defeated Joe in a non-title rematch on the April 29 episode of Raw. The following week, another title match between the two was scheduled for Money in the Bank.

On the April 23 episode of 205 Live, Ariya Daivari defeated Oney Lorcan. General Manager Drake Maverick then scheduled Tony Nese to defend the WWE Cruiserweight Championship against Daivari at Money in the Bank.

After losing the SmackDown Tag Team Championship to The Hardy Boyz (Jeff Hardy and Matt Hardy), The Usos (Jey Uso and Jimmy Uso) were drafted to Raw in the Superstar Shake-up. Two weeks later, The Hardys relinquished the title after Jeff suffered a knee injury. On the May 7 episode of SmackDown, The Usos appeared via the Wild Card Rule to challenge Daniel Bryan and Rowan for the vacant title in a losing effort. The following week, a non-title match between the two teams was scheduled for the Money in the Bank Kickoff pre-show.

== Event ==
Role:	Name:
English commentators	Michael Cole (Raw/Men's MITB Match)
English commentators	Corey Graves (Raw/SmackDown/Men's MITB Match)
English commentators	Renee Young (Raw/Women's MITB Match)
English commentators	Tom Phillips (SmackDown/Women's MITB Match)
English commentators	Byron Saxton (SmackDown/both MITB Matches)
English commentators	Vic Joseph (205 Live)
English commentators	Nigel McGuinness (205 Live)
English commentators	Aiden English (205 Live)
Spanish commentators	Carlos Cabrera
Spanish commentators	Marcelo Rodríguez
German commentators	Carsten Schaefer
German commentators	Tim Haber
German commentators	Calvin Knie
Ring announcers	Greg Hamilton (SmackDown/205 Live/Women's MITB Match)
Ring announcers	Mike Rome (Raw/Men's MITB Match)
Referees	Danilo Anfibio
Referees	Jason Ayers
Referees	Shawn Bennett
Referees	D.A. Brewer
Referees	Mike Chioda
Referees	John Cone
Referees	Darrick Moore
Referees	Drake Wuertz
Referees	Rod Zapata
Interviewers	Charly Caruso
Interviewers	Sarah Schreiber
Pre-show panel	Jonathan Coachman
Pre-show panel	Charly Caruso
Pre-show panel	David Otunga
Pre-show panel	Sam Roberts
Pre-show panel	Beth Phoenix

=== Pre-show ===
During the Money in the Bank Kickoff pre-show, The Usos (Jey Uso and Jimmy Uso) faced SmackDown Tag Team Champions Daniel Bryan and Rowan in a non-title match. In the end, The Usos performed a double "Uso Splash" on Bryan to win the match.

=== Preliminary matches ===
The actual pay-per-view opened with the women's Money in the Bank ladder match, featuring Dana Brooke, Naomi, Natalya, and Nikki Cross from Raw, and Bayley, Carmella, Ember Moon, and Mandy Rose from SmackDown. The climax occurred when Carmella, whose knee had been inadvertently injured by Rose earlier, returned and climbed the ladder, but Rose's tag team partner Sonya Deville pulled Carmella off the ladder and performed a spear on her. Deville then lifted Rose up on her shoulders and ascended the ladder. As Rose was about to retrieve the briefcase, however, Bayley ascended the ladder from the other side, pushed Rose and Deville off, and unhooked the briefcase to win the match.

Next, Samoa Joe defended Raw's United States Championship against Rey Mysterio. In the end, Mysterio countered Joe's Powerbomb into a hurricanrana roll-up and got the pinfall victory to win the title despite Joe's right shoulder being up, which the referee did not see. With the win, Mysterio became WWE's twenty-first Grand Slam Champion. After the match, as Mysterio was celebrating with his son Dominik, Joe viciously attacked Mysterio with two "ura-nages". Dominik then helped his father backstage.

After that, The Miz fought Shane McMahon in a Steel Cage match. Throughout the match, Shane tried various ways to escape the cage. In the end, as Shane tried to escape the cage, Miz caught him. Miz attempted to pull Shane back in the cage by his shirt, however, Shane slipped out of it and fell to the outside floor to win the match by escaping the cage.

Next, Tony Nese defended the WWE Cruiserweight Championship against Ariya Daivari. In the end, Nese performed a Running Nese on Daivari to retain.

Earlier in the night, Sami Zayn had pleaded with Triple H regarding Braun Strowman. Triple H assured Zayn he had nothing to worry about as he supposedly banned Strowman from the building. Following the United States Championship Match, Strowman was shown backstage, angrily searching for Zayn. Following the steel cage match, Zayn had been brutally attacked, rendering him unable to compete in the men's Money in the Bank ladder match. Triple H then searched for Strowman, who denied that he had attacked Zayn. Triple H stated that Strowman would not be replacing Zayn in the ladder match and requested Strowman to leave the arena, who reluctantly agreed.

Next, Becky Lynch defended the Raw Women's Championship against Lacey Evans in her first of two title defenses. In the end, Evans went for a roll-up on Lynch, who countered into a Dis-Arm-Her, forcing Evans to submit to retain the title.

As Lynch was about to head backstage to recover for her SmackDown Women's Championship defense later, Charlotte Flair made her entrance, ready for the match. Instead of heading backstage, Lynch agreed to have the match immediately. In the climax, as Flair attempted Natural Selection on the apron, Lynch countered. Evans then returned and attacked Lynch with the Women's Right while the referee was distracted. Despite this, Lynch caught Flair with a small package, but Flair kicked out and performed a Big Boot on Lynch to win the title for a record fourth time. A furious Lynch then attacked Evans on the outside of the ring. Flair assisted Evans and attacked Lynch. After some double-teaming by Evans and Flair, Money in the Bank winner Bayley came out to make the save. Flair, however, attacked both Bayley and Lynch. As Flair attempted a spear on Bayley, Bayley avoided Flair, who crashed into the ring post. Bayley then took advantage of the opportunity and cashed in her Money in the Bank contract on Flair. Bayley delivered a Bayley Elbow Drop from the top rope on Flair to win the SmackDown Women's Championship for the first time, which was the second fastest cash-in in 40 minutes after winning the contract. The win also made Bayley the first woman to win the Raw, SmackDown, NXT, and Women's Tag Team Championships, as well as WWE's first women's Grand Slam and Triple Crown winner.

After that, Roman Reigns was attacked backstage by Elias with a guitar. Elias then came out and sang a song insulting the fans in Hartford. As Elias was making his exit, Reigns appeared and attacked Elias with a "Superman punch". Reigns then sent Elias to the ring as the bell rang, and executed a spear to win the match in eight seconds.

In the next match, Seth Rollins defended Raw's Universal Championship against AJ Styles. The end came when Rollins avoided a "Phenomenal Forearm" attempt from Styles and performed the Ripcord Knee, followed by a superkick and The Stomp to retain the title. After the match, Styles and Rollins showed mutual respect by shaking hands.

After that, Lucha House Party (Kalisto, Gran Metalik, and Lince Dorado) came out for an unadvertised match, however, they were attacked by Lars Sullivan and the match never occurred.

In the penultimate match, Kofi Kingston defended SmackDown's WWE Championship against Kevin Owens. At the request from Kingston, fellow New Day member Xavier Woods did not accompany Kingston to the ring. The finish came as Owens attempted a Swanton from the top rope. Kingston countered by raising his knees and then performed the Trouble in Paradise on Owens to retain the title.

=== Main event ===
The main event was the men's Money in the Bank ladder match, which began with seven of the eight scheduled participants: Baron Corbin, Drew McIntyre and Ricochet from Raw, and Ali, Andrade, Finn Bálor and Randy Orton from SmackDown – a replacement was not immediately announced for Sami Zayn. Andrade performed a Sunset Flip from the top of a ladder on Bálor onto another ladder. Later, Ali performed a Spanish Fly from the top of the ladder on Andrade. Corbin performed a Chokeslam on Ali through an announce table, after which, Corbin betrayed McIntyre after working together throughout the match. Later, McIntyre performed a Claymore Kick on Corbin and back in the ring, McIntyre prevented Bálor from retrieving the briefcase, and suplexed him onto the ladder. McIntyre performed a reverse Alabama Slam on Andrade onto Bálor. Ricochet performed a Dropkick on McIntyre but as he climbed the ladder, McIntyre stopped him, and threw him outside the ring through another ladder. As McIntyre was climbing the ladder, Orton performed an RKO on McIntyre, only to be sent into the ring post by Corbin. As Corbin was climbing the ladder, Ali stopped him. Corbin attempted a Powerbomb on Ali, however, Ali sent Corbin out of the ring. Ali then climbed the ladder and was about to retrieve the briefcase when Brock Lesnar (along with Paul Heyman) made a surprise return – making him Raw's unannounced fourth participant in place of Zayn. Lesnar ran to the ring, knocked Ali off the ladder, and then climbed the ladder to retrieve the briefcase to win the match. With this victory, Lesnar became the third wrestler (after Edge and Sheamus) to win Money in the Bank, King of the Ring, and the Royal Rumble.

== Reception ==
Dave Meltzer of the Wrestling Observer Newsletter said, "The WWE Universal Championship match was the rare WWE PPV match that would fit in on an NXT show".

== Aftermath ==
On the following night's Raw, men's Money in the Bank ladder match winner Brock Lesnar along with Paul Heyman put out a warning to Universal Champion Seth Rollins and WWE Champion Kofi Kingston, who appeared via the wild card rule, and later teased cashing in on them. On SmackDown, WWE Champion Kofi Kingston and Xavier Woods had a welcome back celebration for Big E, returning from his injury. Kevin Owens interrupted but The New Day berated him about losing. The following week, Kingston and Owens had a non-title rematch that Kingston also won. AJ Styles was interviewed on Raw about his loss to Universal Champion Seth Rollins, but was interrupted by Baron Corbin. The following week, Styles was scheduled to compete in a fatal four-way match for another opportunity to challenge Rollins at Super ShowDown, but was still ailing from injuries sustained from Money in the Bank and was replaced by Corbin, who won the match to become the number one contender.

Raw Women's Champion Becky Lynch appeared on Alexa Bliss's "A Moment of Bliss", co-hosted by Nikki Cross. They were interrupted by WWE Women's Tag Team Champions The IIconics (Billie Kay and Peyton Royce), as well as Lacey Evans, who boasted about causing Lynch to lose the SmackDown Women's Championship. This led to a six-woman tag team match in which Lynch, Cross, and Bliss defeated Evans and The IIconics. A rematch between Lynch and Evans was scheduled for Stomping Grounds. On SmackDown, Charlotte Flair competed in a triple threat match in an attempt to earn a rematch against Bayley for the SmackDown Women's Championship at Stomping Grounds, but it was won by Raw's Alexa Bliss, appearing via the wild card rule.

At Super Show-Down, Seth Rollins successfully retained the Universal Championship against Baron Corbin. Afterwards, Brock Lesnar tried to cash in the Money in the Bank contract, but Heyman tripped as he was getting in the ring, allowing Rollins to lay out Lesnar. Another rematch between Rollins and Corbin for the title was scheduled for Stomping Grounds with a special guest referee. At the event, after Becky Lynch retained the Raw Women's Championship against Lacey Evans, Evans was the special guest referee for the Universal Championship match. Despite this, Lynch prevented interference, allowing Rollins to retain. The following night on Raw, a last chance winner takes all mixed tag team extreme rules match pitting Rollins and Lynch against Corbin and Evans for the Universal and Raw Women's Championships was scheduled for Extreme Rules, where Rollins and Lynch retained. Afterwards, Lesnar successfully cashed in the contract and defeated Rollins to win the Universal Championship for the third time.

Roman Reigns had a rematch with Elias on SmackDown that Reigns also won, but was attacked by Drew McIntyre, who appeared via the wild card rule. Reigns was also scheduled to face Shane McMahon at Super ShowDown. Miz confronted Shane backstage on Raw, but was intervened by McIntyre, who defeated Miz in a match.

Samoa Joe said that he was not angry at Rey Mysterio for the referee's mistake, but said Mysterio should hand him back the championship to set a good example for his son Dominik. It was then revealed that Mysterio suffered a shoulder injury thanks to Joe's post-match beat down at Money in the Bank, and he relinquished the title back to Joe on the June 3 episode of Raw.

On Raw, Sami Zayn was scheduled to face Braun Strowman. Zayn attempted to get help from Bobby Lashley, who was scheduled to face Strowman at Super ShowDown. Lashley, however, refused to help Zayn, who lost to Strowman. Also on Raw, as Lars Sullivan was about to be interviewed in regard to his attack on Lucha House Party (Kalisto, Lince Dorado, and Gran Metalik), he was interrupted by the team. The trio attacked Sullivan, however, Sullivan fended them off. A 3-on-1 handicap match pitting Sullivan against Lucha House Party was scheduled for Super ShowDown.

Following their scuffle during the women's ladder match, Carmella had a match against Mandy Rose on the May 28 episode of SmackDown. Rose won the match thanks to a distraction from Sonya Deville. They continued their feud over the following episodes.

== Results ==
No.	Results	Stipulations	Times
1^{P}	The Usos (Jey Uso and Jimmy Uso) defeated Daniel Bryan and Rowan by pinfall	Tag team match	11:05
2	Bayley defeated Carmella, Dana Brooke, Ember Moon, Mandy Rose (with Sonya Deville), Naomi, Natalya, and Nikki Cross	Money in the Bank ladder match for a women's championship match contract	13:50
3	Rey Mysterio defeated Samoa Joe (c) by pinfall	Singles match for the WWE United States Championship	1:40
4	Shane McMahon defeated The Miz by escaping the cage	Steel Cage match	13:00
5	Tony Nese (c) defeated Ariya Daivari by pinfall	Singles match for the WWE Cruiserweight Championship	9:25
6	Becky Lynch (c) defeated Lacey Evans by submission	Singles match for the WWE Raw Women's Championship	8:40
7	Charlotte Flair defeated Becky Lynch (c) by pinfall	Singles match for the WWE SmackDown Women's Championship	6:15
8	Bayley defeated Charlotte Flair (c) by pinfall	Singles match for the WWE SmackDown Women's Championship; This was Bayley's Money in the Bank cash-in match.	0:20
9	Roman Reigns defeated Elias by pinfall	Singles match	0:08
10	Seth Rollins (c) defeated AJ Styles by pinfall	Singles match for the WWE Universal Championship	19:45
11	Kofi Kingston (c) defeated Kevin Owens by pinfall	Singles match for the WWE Championship	14:10
12	Brock Lesnar (with Paul Heyman) (Note: Lesnar replaced Sami Zayn due to Zayn being injured in a pre-match attack.) defeated Ali, Andrade, Baron Corbin, Drew McIntyre, Finn Bálor, Randy Orton, and Ricochet	Money in the Bank ladder match for a world championship match contract	19:00
(c) / – the champion(s) heading into the match; P / – the match was broadcast on the pre-show
