= Lacey Evans =

American professional wrestler (born 1990)

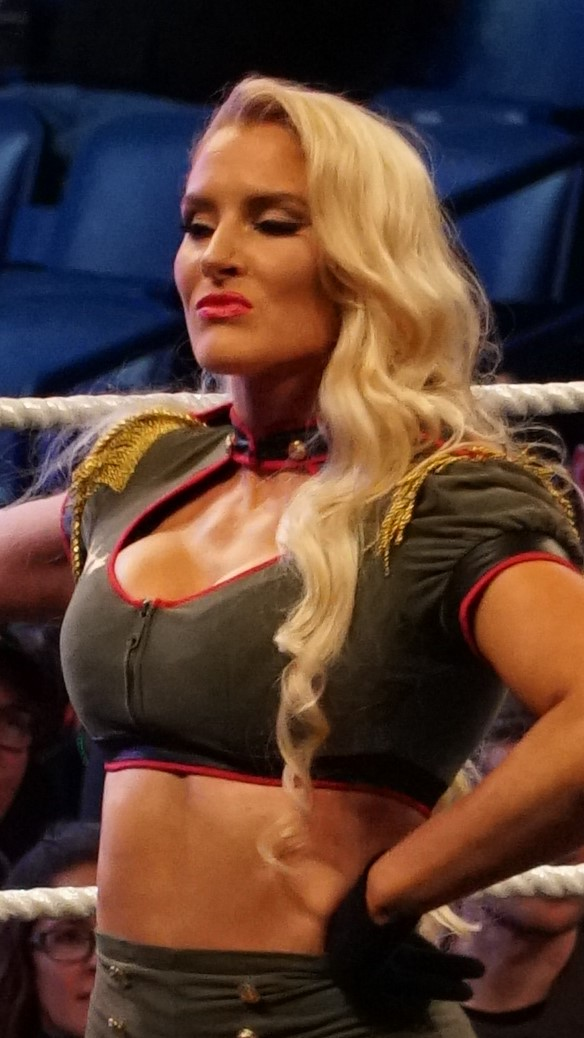
- Evans in March 2018

Personal information
- Born: Macey Evans; March 24, 1990 (age 36) Georgia, U.S.
- Education: Indian River State College
- Spouse: Alfonso Estrella-Kadlec (m. 2009)
- Children: 3

Professional wrestling career
- Ring name(s): Lacey Evans; Macey Estrella; Macey Evans; Ruby Mobs
- Billed height: 5 ft 8 in (173 cm)
- Billed from: Parris Island, South Carolina
- Trained by: Tom Caiazzo; Sara Del Rey; WWE Performance Center
- Debut: 2014
- Retired: 2023
- Military service
- Allegiance: United States
- Branch: United States Marine Corps
- Service years: 2009–2014
- Rank: Sergeant
- Units: Special Reaction Team; Provost Marshal's Office
- Conflicts: War in Afghanistan; Iraq War
- Awards: National Defense Service Medal; Global War on Terrorism Service Medal

Macey Estrella-Kadlec (née Evans; born March 24, 1990) is an American professional wrestler and former U.S. Marine. She is best known for her tenure in WWE, where she performed under the ring name Lacey Evans.

Originally introduced to wrestling while serving as a military police officer in the Marines, Evans trained and began her career on the independent circuit. She started working for WWE in their NXT developmental brand in 2016, and participated in their inaugural Mae Young Classic. After feuding with Kairi Sane in NXT, Evans debuted on the main roster on Raw in January 2019, entering a feud with Becky Lynch that culminated in a mixed tag team match in the main event of Extreme Rules. Over the next several years, Evans had various feuds on WWE programming until leaving the promotion in August 2023.

== Early life ==
Estrella-Kadlec was born Macey Evans in Georgia on March 24, 1990. According to ESPN, she was "raised in a home torn by depression, drug, and alcohol abuse" and had to live in tents at times while growing up due to her parents' legal problems. Her father, who had entertained thoughts of becoming a wrestler but never acted on them, died of a drug overdose on July 5, 2015 before she got her WWE tryout.

== Military career ==
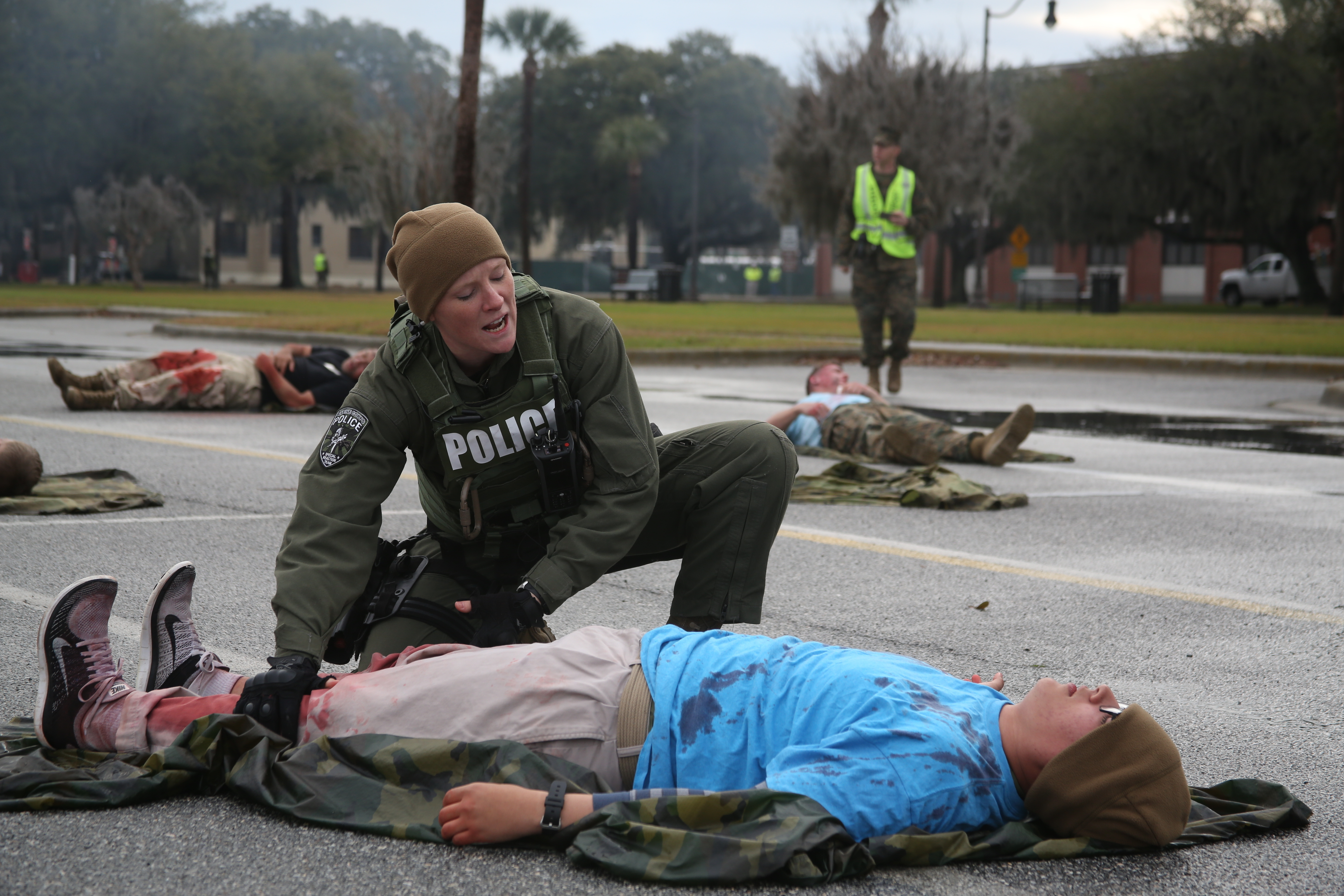
Estrella-Kadlec at a Marine Corps exercise in Parris Island, South Carolina in February 2015

Estrella-Kadlec is a veteran of the Marines, serving as a United States Marine Corps Military Police officer, including Special Reaction Team training. She enlisted at age 19 and served for five years, earning a bachelor's degree from Indian River State College and starting a construction business while on active duty. She was introduced to professional wrestling while in the Marines through a Staff Sergeant who promoted independent shows on the side. On the second show of which she attended, the Staff Sergeant booked her to wrestle him.

== Professional wrestling career ==
=== Independent circuit (2014–2016) ===
Estrella-Kadlec trained under Tom Caiazzo at the American Premier Wrestling training facility in Statesboro, Georgia. She made her debut for the promotion in 2014, later winning the company's World Heavyweight Championship.

=== WWE (2016–2023) ===
==== NXT (2016–2018) ====
On April 12, 2016, Estrella-Kadlec signed with WWE and was assigned to the developmental brand, NXT, and began training at the WWE Performance Center. At an NXT Live show on October 20, she made her wrestling debut as Macey Estrella in a battle royal, which was ultimately won by Ember Moon. Three months later, in her first appearance on the NXT television program, Evans teamed with Sarah Bridges in a tag team match which they lost to the team of Billie Kay and Peyton Royce. In 2017, Estrella was given the ring name Lacey Evans, which is coincidentally, her sister's maiden name. She was used mostly as a jobber to various competitors. In July, Evans participated in the inaugural Mae Young Classic, defeating Taynara Conti in the first round, but losing to Toni Storm in the second round.

On the January 17, 2018, episode of NXT, Evans established herself as a heel. In April, Evans started a feud with Kairi Sane, as the two exchanged victories and attacked each other throughout the next few weeks. Eventually, Evans lost to Sane on the June 6 episode of NXT to end their feud. Throughout the rest of the year, Evans started a winning streak, defeating the likes of Dakota Kai and Candice LeRae.

==== Main roster (2018–2023) ====
On the December 17, 2018, episode of Raw, Evans was advertised as one of six NXT wrestlers about to move to the main roster. In January 2019, she participated in the women's Royal Rumble match at the Royal Rumble. She entered the match at number 1 and lasted over 29 minutes, eliminating The IIconics (Billie Kay and Peyton Royce), before she was eliminated by Charlotte Flair. After that, Evans began appearing on Raw, SmackDown, and at pay-per-views to interrupt various segments and matches by walking out on stage, waving to the crowd, and leaving.

Shortly after WrestleMania 35, Evans was drafted to the Raw brand as part of the 2019 WWE Superstar Shake-up, and placed in her first feud on the main roster as she continuously attacked Raw and SmackDown Women's Champion Becky Lynch. This led to a title match between the two for the Raw Women's Championship at Money in the Bank, where Evans lost to Lynch via submission. A few minutes later, Evans helped Flair win the SmackDown Women's Championship from Lynch. Throughout mid-2019, Evans continued to feud with Lynch and was defeated by her at Stomping Grounds, she lost again to Lynch, and in the main event, was Baron Corbin's choice for a special referee for the WWE Universal Championship match, due to Seth Rollins dating Lynch. At Extreme Rules, Evans and Corbin challenged Lynch and Rollins for their respective titles in a last chance extreme rules mixed tag team match, where they failed to win the match after Rollins pinned Corbin, thus ending her feud with Lynch.

As part of the 2019 Draft in October, Evans was drafted to the SmackDown brand. At Crown Jewel, Evans and Natalya became the first female wrestlers to wrestle in Saudi Arabia, where Evans lost. At Survivor Series, Evans then went on to compete in the 15 woman elimination tag match, where Team NXT ultimately won. On the November 29 episode of SmackDown, Evans took exception to Banks and Bayley insulting the SmackDown roster, particularly the women, for losing to Team NXT at Survivor Series. After exchanging insults, Evans hit Banks and left the ring, thus turning face.

In 2020, at the Royal Rumble, Evans challenged Bayley for the SmackDown Women's Championship in a losing effort. At WrestleMania 36, Evans was part of a five-way elimination match for the SmackDown Women's Champion. Evans lost the match after being pinned by Bayley due to interference by Banks. On the April 24 episode of SmackDown, Evans won against Banks in a qualifying match for the opportunity to be in the Women's Money in the Bank ladder match. At Money in the Bank, Evans was unsuccessful in the namesake match, as she was pulled down a ladder by Asuka, who went on to win. On the July 10 episode of SmackDown, Evans attacked Naomi, after she lost a karaoke contest to her, thus turning heel once again. As part of the 2020 Draft, Evans was drafted to the Raw brand.

On the January 4, 2021, episode of Raw, Evans started a storyline with Ric Flair when, during a match against WWE Women's Tag Team Champions Charlotte Flair and Asuka, Evans flirted with Ric. During the following weeks, Ric managed Evans, usually distracting his daughter Charlotte, including a participation in the women's Royal Rumble. On February 15, Evans' real-life pregnancy was announced and incorporated into a storyline on that night's episode of Raw, in which Ric was implied to be the father. Evans was scheduled to face Asuka for the Raw Women's Championship at Elimination Chamber, but the match was canceled due to her pregnancy; the storyline with Ric and Charlotte was cancelled as a result. She was reportedly planned to win the title at the event.

After over one year of inactivity due to her pregnancy, on the April 8, 2022, episode of SmackDown, Evans returned to the show in a vignette talking about her life, taking on a military inspired character, but she was drafted to Raw as a militaristic heel character. Weeks later, she was moved to SmackDown again. On the June 10 episode of SmackDown, Evans made her in-ring return, turning again into a face character, defeating Xia Li to qualify for the women's Money in the Bank ladder match. At Money in the Bank, she was unsuccessful in winning the match. On the following episode of SmackDown, Evans turned heel when she berated the fans and attacked her tag team partner Aliyah. The same thing would occur on the next two episodes of SmackDown. The two were supposed to have a match on the July 29 episode, but Evans was not medically cleared to compete. Starting on the December 2 episode, vignettes aired showing Evans training in the military, adopting the cobra clutch as her finisher. This character drew criticism from Sgt. Slaughter, a wrestler who also had a military-based character and used the cobra clutch as his finisher. Evans's last match was a dark match on the July 7, 2023 episode of SmackDown. Her WWE contract expired on August 15, 2023. During an appearance on Insight with Chris Van Vliet, Evans explained WWE was never her passion.

== Other media ==
Estrella-Kadlec as Lacey Evans is a playable character in video games WWE 2K19 ("Rising Stars" DLC), WWE 2K20, WWE 2K22 and WWE 2K23.

Estrella-Kadlec appeared in the music video for "Can't Cancel All Of Us" by Tom MacDonald.

Estrella-Kadlec started an Onlyfans page and claims she earns more money from it than she ever did wrestling.

== Personal life ==
Estrella-Kadlec is married with three daughters, and resides in Parris Island, South Carolina. In August 2023, Estrella-Kadlec opened the "Sunny Summers Cafe" in the Beaufort Plaza Shopping Center in Beaufort, South Carolina. The café, which is named after her daughters, features WWE memorabilia including Lacey Evans action figures. Estrella-Kadlec stated that she planned for the café to help address community issues such as mental health and addiction, including by hosting Alcoholics Anonymous and Narcotics Anonymous meetings.

== Championships and accomplishments ==
- American Premier Wrestling
  - APW World Heavyweight Championship (1 time)
- Pro Wrestling Illustrated
  - Ranked No. 23 of the top 100 female wrestlers in the PWI Women's 100 in 2019
- WWE
  - Slammy Award (1 time)
    - Trash Talker of the Year (2020) shared with The Hurt Business
