= Heavy Machinery (professional wrestling) =

Professional wrestling tag team

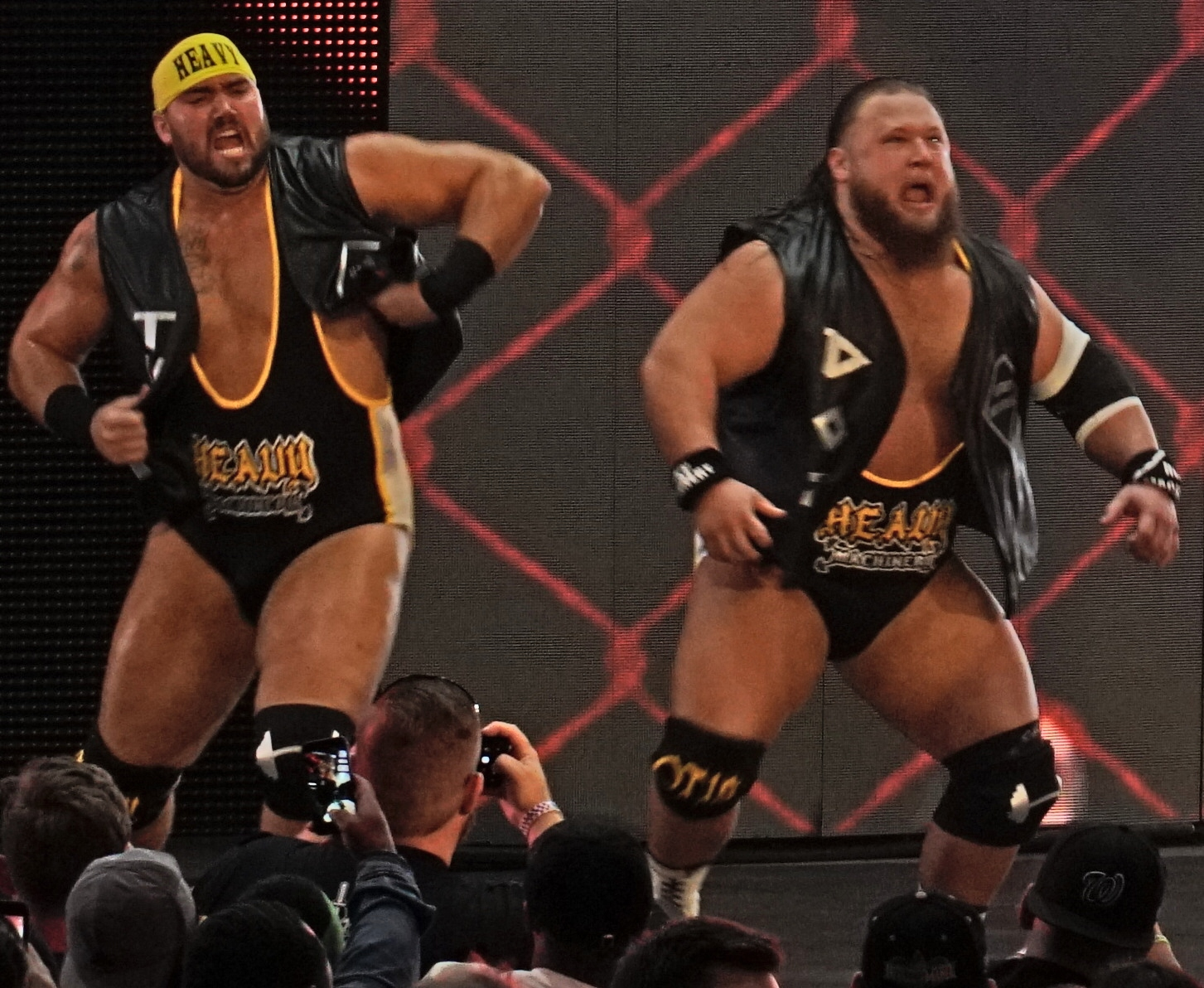
- Heavy Machinery – Tucker (left) and Otis (right) in April 2018

Tag team
- Members: Otis / Otis Dozovic / El Gran Gordo; Tucker / Tucker Knight
- Name(s): Otis Dozovic and Tucker Knight; Heavy Machinery; El Gran Gordo and Tucker
- Billed heights: 5 ft 10 in (1.78 m) – Otis; 6 ft 2 in (1.88 m) – Tucker
- Combined billed weight: 650 lb (290 kg); Otis (330 lb); Tucker (320 lb)
- Hometown: Clackamas, Oregon (Tucker / Tucker Knight); Duluth, Minnesota (Otis / Otis Dozovic / El Gran Gordo)
- Billed from: Clackamas, Oregon (Tucker / Tucker Knight); Duluth, Minnesota (Otis / Otis Dozovic / El Gran Gordo)
- Debut: July 22, 2016
- Disbanded: October 25, 2020
- Years active: 2016–2020

Heavy Machinery were an American professional wrestling tag team in WWE, composed of Otis and Tucker.

They started to work together while they were trained in NXT, WWE's farm territory as Otis Dozovic and Tucker Knight. They stayed in NXT until 2019, when they were promoted to the main roster and shortly after, their ringnames were shortened to Otis and Tucker. They competed several times for the Smackdown Tag Team Championships, but they never won it. Despite this, Otis won the Money in the Bank briefcase in 2020. Months later, the team was split when Tucker was drafted to Raw and Otis stayed on SmackDown. At Hell in a Cell, Tucker betrayed Otis, signalling the end of the team.

== History ==
=== NXT (2016–2019) ===
In July 2016, Bogojevic and Knight formed a tag team calling themselves Heavy Machinery. The duo participated in the 2016 Dusty Rhodes Tag Team Classic, losing in the first round to the team of Austin Aries and Roderick Strong. The duo returned and had their first televised victory on the March 29 episode of NXT, defeating the team of Mike Marshall and Jonathan Ortagun.

=== SmackDown (2019–2020) ===
Tucker Knight made his first televised main roster appearance at the Greatest Royal Rumble event in Jeddah, Saudi Arabia, entering the Royal Rumble match at #24 and eliminating Drew Gulak before being eliminated by Big E. On the December 17 episode of Raw, Heavy Machinery were advertised as two of six NXT wrestlers to be moved to the main roster. With the shortened names of Otis and Tucker, they debuted on the January 14 episode of Raw interrupting an interview between Alexa Bliss and Paul Heyman. On the April 16 episode of SmackDown, the team was moved to the SmackDown brand during the 2019 WWE Superstar Shake-up. At WrestleMania 35, Otis and Tucker competed in the sixth annual André the Giant Memorial Battle Royal, but failed to win. In May, they started a feud with SmackDown Tag Team Champions Daniel Bryan and Erick Rowan. The duo participated at the 51-Man Battle Royal at the 2019 Super ShowDown, but they were both eliminated during the match. After weeks of mind games from the champions, Heavy Machinery faced Bryan and Rowan at Stomping Grounds in a losing effort. On the July 2nd episode of SmackDown, Otis and Tucker defeated Dolph Ziggler and Kevin Owens to become the number one contenders to the SmackDown Tag Team Championship. At Extreme Rules, Heavy Machinery lost to Bryan and Rowan and The New Day.

On the September 30 episode of Raw, Heavy Machinery made an appearance via the wild card rule to challenge for the Raw Tag Team Championship, but lost to champions Dolph Ziggler and Robert Roode. At Crown Jewel on October 31, Heavy Machinery competed in a tag team turmoil match, but were eliminated by The New Day.

At Survivor Series, Heavy Machinery participated in an interbrand tag team battle royal which was won by Dolph Ziggler and Robert Roode. By the end of 2019, Otis had entered into a romantic storyline with Mandy Rose. On the February 14, 2020, episode of SmackDown, Otis had a date with Rose but saw Dolph Ziggler sitting at her table, causing Otis to walk away heartbroken. On the March 6 episode of SmackDown, Otis and Tucker tried apologized to Rose, but Rose dismissed his apology. On the March 20 episode of SmackDown, Ziggler distracted Otis and Tucker by showing pictures of him and Rose and caused them to get disqualified in a match against The Miz and John Morrison. On the April 3 episode of SmackDown, Tucker was attacked by Ziggler ahead of Ziggler's WrestleMania match with Otis. The following week on SmackDown, Tucker challenged Ziggler to a rematch but was unsuccessful. At WrestleMania 36, Otis defeated Ziggler with the help of Rose, who kissed him after the match. On May 10 at Money in the Bank, Otis won the briefcase after AJ Styles and King Corbin tussled over the briefcase and dropped it to Otis unintentionally.

As part of the 2020 Draft in October, Tucker was drafted to the Raw brand and Otis remained on the SmackDown brand, splitting the team. Despite being on different brands, Tucker and Otis teamed up one more time on the October 19 episode of RAW, where Otis appeared disguised under a mask and using the name El Gran Gordo. The team broke up at Hell in a Cell, where Tucker attacked Otis during a match against The Miz, costing Otis the Money In The Bank briefcase. Later backstage Otis and Tucker had another brawl, where Otis was shown to be dominating against Tucker.

On April 16, 2021, Tucker was released from his WWE contract.

== Other media ==
The duo made their video game debuts in WWE 2K19 and were also in WWE 2K20.

== Championships and accomplishments ==
- Pro Wrestling Illustrated
  - Rookie of the Year (2017) – Otis
  - Ranked Otis No. 69 of the top 500 singles wrestlers in the PWI 500 in 2020
  - Ranked Tucker No. 185 of the top 500 singles wrestlers in the PWI 500 in 2019
- WWE
  - Money in the Bank (Men's 2020) – Otis
