= Stomping Grounds =

2019 WWE pay-per-view and livestreaming event

- Promotional poster featuring Roman Reigns
- Promotion: WWE
- Brand(s): Raw; SmackDown; 205 Live
- Date: June 23, 2019
- City: Tacoma, Washington
- Venue: Tacoma Dome
- Attendance: 6,000
- Tagline: Kick Ass and Take Names

WWE event chronology
← Previous; Super ShowDown	Next → Extreme Rules

Stomping Grounds was a 2019 professional wrestling pay-per-view (PPV) and livestreaming event produced by WWE, held for wrestlers from the promotion's main roster brands, Raw, SmackDown, and 205 Live. The event took place on June 23, 2019, at the Tacoma Dome in Tacoma, Washington. It replaced an originally planned Backlash that was scheduled for June 16 in San Diego, California with that date and location repurposed as a non-televised house show. This would be the only Stomping Grounds as Backlash was reinstated in 2020.

Nine matches were contested at the event, including one on the Kickoff pre-show. In the main event, Seth Rollins defeated Baron Corbin in a no countout, no disqualification match to retain Raw's Universal Championship with Lacey Evans as the special guest referee. In other prominent matches, Kofi Kingston defeated Dolph Ziggler in a Steel Cage match to retain SmackDown's WWE Championship, Ricochet defeated Samoa Joe to win Raw's United States Championship, and SmackDown's Roman Reigns defeated Raw's Drew McIntyre in an interpromotional match.

== Production ==
=== Background ===
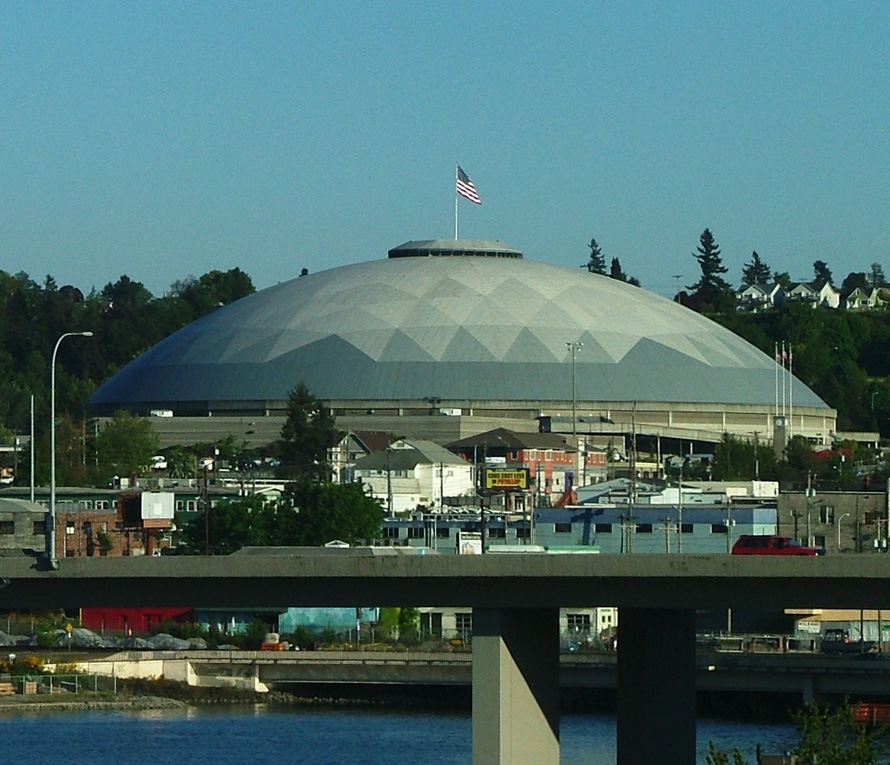
Stomping Grounds was held at the Tacoma Dome in Tacoma, Washington.

WWE had originally scheduled to hold its established professional wrestling event, Backlash, on June 16, 2019, at the Pechanga Arena in San Diego, California, which would have been the 15th Backlash event. On April 29, however, it was announced that due to Super ShowDown occurring only nine days before on June 7, Backlash was canceled with its date and location repurposed as a non-televised house show, while a new pay-per-view (PPV) and livestreaming event titled Stomping Grounds was instead scheduled for June 23 at the Tacoma Dome in Tacoma, Washington, featuring wrestlers from the Raw, SmackDown, and 205 Live brand divisions. In addition to airing on traditional PPV worldwide, it was livestreamed on the WWE Network.

=== Storylines ===
The event comprised nine matches, including one on the Kickoff pre-show, that resulted from scripted storylines. Results were predetermined by WWE's writers on the Raw, SmackDown, and 205 Live brands, while storylines were produced on WWE's weekly television shows, Monday Night Raw, SmackDown Live, and the cruiserweight-exclusive 205 Live.

During Seth Rollins's Universal Championship defense against Baron Corbin at Super ShowDown, Corbin got into an argument with referee John Cone, allowing Rollins to roll-up Corbin to retain the title. After the match, Corbin attacked Rollins with the "End of Days" and a title rematch was scheduled for Stomping Grounds. On the following Raw, Corbin revealed that he was able to convince WWE officials to allow him to choose a special guest referee for their rematch, since he felt that it was Cone's fault for him losing at Super ShowDown. Corbin was going to choose Elias, but he was attacked by Rollins, who followed suit and continued to attack Corbin's other potential choices: EC3 and Eric Young on Raw, and The B-Team (Curtis Axel and Bo Dallas) on SmackDown. Corbin's decision on the special guest referee remained unknown before Stomping Grounds.

At Money in the Bank, Bayley won the women's Money in the Bank ladder match and later that night cashed in the contract on Charlotte Flair to win the SmackDown Women's Championship. On the June 4 episode of SmackDown, Flair competed in a triple threat match against Carmella and Raw's Alexa Bliss, who appeared via the wild card rule, in order to earn a rematch against Bayley for the title at Stomping Grounds. Bliss, however, won the match, thus Bliss earned the title match.

At WrestleMania 35, Roman Reigns defeated Drew McIntyre. Reigns was then drafted to SmackDown in the Superstar Shake-up, while McIntyre joined forces with Shane McMahon, but lost another match to Reigns by disqualification when Reigns appeared on the May 6 episode of Raw via the wild card rule. At Super ShowDown, Shane defeated Reigns thanks to a Claymore from McIntyre while the referee was incapacitated. Afterwards, another match between Reigns and McIntyre was scheduled for Stomping Grounds.

At Money in the Bank, Becky Lynch retained the Raw Women's Championship against Lacey Evans, who in turn caused Lynch to lose her SmackDown Women's Championship to Charlotte Flair that same night. After more feuding on Raw, another match between Lynch and Evans for the Raw Women's Championship was scheduled for Stomping Grounds.

At Super ShowDown, Kofi Kingston defeated Raw's Dolph Ziggler by way of the wild card rule to retain SmackDown's WWE Championship thanks to interference from fellow New Day member Xavier Woods. Following the match, an irate Ziggler claimed he would have beaten Kingston had it not been for Woods and then challenged Kingston to a Steel Cage match for the title at Stomping Grounds and Kingston accepted. Also following Super ShowDown, Ziggler was officially moved to SmackDown.

On the May 14 episode of SmackDown, Sami Zayn, who appeared via the wild card rule, became involved in Kevin Owens's feud against The New Day (Kofi Kingston, Big E, and Xavier Woods). The following week, Kingston defeated Zayn. On the May 28 episode, Kingston defeated Owens in a non-title rematch from Money in the Bank. The following week, Woods and Kingston defeated Owens and Zayn. On the June 11 episode, The New Day defeated the team of Dolph Ziggler, Owens, and Zayn. On the following Raw, wild card guests The New Day defeated the team of Owens (also appearing via the wild card rule), Zayn, and Baron Corbin in a two out of three falls match. A tag team match between New Day's Big E and Woods against Owens and Zayn was then scheduled for Stomping Grounds.

On the June 11 episode of 205 Live, a fatal four-way match between Drew Gulak, Humberto Carrillo, Oney Lorcan, and Akira Tozawa occurred to determine the number one contender against Tony Nese for the WWE Cruiserweight Championship on the Stomping Grounds Kickoff pre-show. The match, however, ended with both Gulak and Tozawa scoring a double pin. The following week, 205 Live General Manager Drake Maverick decided that Nese would defend the title against both Gulak and Tozawa in a triple threat match.

On the June 10 episode of Raw, United States Champion Samoa Joe was a guest on The Miz's "Miz TV", only to get interrupted by Braun Strowman, Bobby Lashley, Ricochet, and Cesaro, each stating a claim to challenge Joe for his title. The following week, a fatal five-way elimination match between Strowman, Lashley, Ricochet, Cesaro, and Miz occurred to determine Joe's challenger for the title at Stomping Grounds, which was won by Ricochet.

After SmackDown Tag Team Champions Daniel Bryan and Rowan berated the SmackDown tag team division on the May 28 episode of SmackDown, Heavy Machinery (Otis and Tucker) interrupted and challenged the champions to a title match, which was accepted but for a later time. On the June 11 episode, Bryan and Rowan were set to have a title unification match with the kayfabe Yolo County Tag Team Champions, a couple of "local" wrestlers with cardboard belts. Heavy Machinery came out before the match and accused Bryan and Rowan of avoiding their challenge. Bryan said that Heavy Machinery needed to earn the opportunity and had them instead face the enhancement talent, who Heavy Machinery quickly defeated. Bryan and Rowan were then scheduled to defend the SmackDown Tag Team Championship against Heavy Machinery at Stomping Grounds.

== Event ==
Other on-screen personnel
Role:	Name:
English commentators	Michael Cole (Raw)
English commentators	Corey Graves (Raw/SmackDown)
English commentators	Renee Young (Raw)
English commentators	Tom Phillips (SmackDown)
English commentators	Byron Saxton (SmackDown)
English commentators	Vic Joseph (205 Live)
English commentators	Nigel McGuinness (205 Live)
English commentators	Aiden English (205 Live)
Spanish commentators	Carlos Cabrera
Spanish commentators	Marcelo Rodríguez
German commentators	Carsten Schaefer
German commentators	Tim Haber
German commentators	Calvin Knie
Ring announcers	Greg Hamilton (SmackDown/205 Live)
Ring announcers	Mike Rome (Raw)
Referees	Danilo Anfibio
Referees	Mike Chioda
Referees	John Cone
Referees	Lacey Evans
Referees	Darrick Moore
Referees	Charles Robinson
Referees	Rod Zapata
Interviewers	Charly Caruso
Interviewers	Kayla Braxton
Pre-show panel	Jonathan Coachman
Pre-show panel	Charly Caruso
Pre-show panel	Booker T
Pre-show panel	David Otunga

=== Pre-show ===
During the Stomping Grounds Kickoff pre-show, Tony Nese defended 205 Live's WWE Cruiserweight Championship against Drew Gulak and Akira Tozawa. In the climax, after Nese was pushed out of the ring, Gulak performed an Argentine neckbreaker on Tozawa to win the title.

=== Preliminary matches ===
The actual pay-per-view opened with Becky Lynch defending the Raw Women's Championship against Lacey Evans. In the end, Lynch forced Evans to submit to the "Dis-Arm-Her" to retain the title.

Next, Kevin Owens and Sami Zayn faced The New Day (Big E and Xavier Woods). In the end, Owens performed a stunner on Woods to win the match.

After that, Samoa Joe defended Raw's United States Championship against Ricochet. The end came when Ricochet performed a Recoil and a 630° senton on Joe to win the title. Immediately after the match, Ricochet was congratulated backstage by Seth Rollins, Curt Hawkins, Zack Ryder, Carmella, Charlotte Flair, Heavy Machinery (Otis and Tucker), and WWE Chief Operating Officer Triple H.

In the fourth match, Daniel Bryan and Rowan defended the SmackDown Tag Team Championship against Heavy Machinery (Otis and Tucker). In the end, Tucker performed a cross-body on Rowan on the outside of the ring. Bryan then pinned Tucker with a small package to retain the titles.

Next, Bayley defended the SmackDown Women's Championship against Raw's Alexa Bliss (who was accompanied by Nikki Cross). During the match, Bayley performed a suicide dive on Cross. In the end, Cross inadvertently distracted Bliss. Bliss attempted "Twisted Bliss", however, Bayley countered by raising her knees. Bayley performed a "Bayley-to-Belly Suplex" on Bliss to retain the title.

After that, Roman Reigns faced Drew McIntyre (accompanied by Shane McMahon). During the match, Shane attempted to distract Reigns on numerous occasions. Reigns performed a Spear on McIntyre only for Shane to pull the referee out of the ring during a pinfall attempt. Shane performed a Coast-to-Coast on Reigns and McIntyre scored a nearfall. In the end, as McIntyre attempted a "Claymore", Reigns countered with a superman punch and performed a spear to win the match.

In the penultimate match, The New Day's Kofi Kingston defended SmackDown's WWE Championship against Dolph Ziggler in a Steel Cage match. In the end, as Ziggler was attempting to crawl out of the cage door, Kingston jumped over Ziggler and through the door to escape the cage first to retain the title.

=== Main event ===
In the main event, Seth Rollins defended the Universal Championship against Baron Corbin, who revealed the special guest referee to be Lacey Evans. Throughout the match, Evans favored Corbin as a way to redeem herself from her loss earlier in the night against Becky Lynch, Rollins' real-life girlfriend. After Rollins performed a powerbomb on Corbin through the English announcers' table, Evans counted up to 9 before changing the stipulation of the match to a No Countout match. Corbin then attacked Rollins with a steel chair that Rollins brought earlier. Rather than disqualifying Corbin, Evans added that the match was now also a No Disqualification match. Corbin attempted to perform a DDT on Rollins on the steel chair, only for Rollins to counter and performed a "Falcon Arrow" to Corbin onto the steel chair. Rollins attempted a pin on Corbin only for Evans to refuse. An irate Rollins turned his attention to Evans, who slapped and performed a low-blow on him, allowing Corbin to perform the "End of Days" on Rollins. Before Evans could count the pin, however, Lynch ran out and brawled with Evans. Referees emerged and separated Lynch and Evans, one of them being John Cone, who in turn replaced Evans as referee, much to Corbin's dismay. In the climax, as Corbin attempted another "End of Days", Rollins countered into a superkick and followed up with "The Stomp" to retain the title.

== Reception ==
The event received mostly positive critical reactions. Jason Powell of Pro Wrestling Dot Net described Stomping Grounds as a "straight forward show" that ended in a "polarizing" main event. Though the "wrestlers worked hard", the show featured "bad title feuds" that Powell wished would end. The main event angle was judged more worthy of a Raw than a pay-per-view, Kingston-Ziggler "suffered from it being so difficult to believe that Ziggler was a threat", and Reigns-McIntyre was "very good", but McIntyre "still seems like he's just another guy they are feeding to Reigns rather than someone they have a real plan for". Also, "WWE has been labeling Ricochet as a sensation and this win is the first time they've actually made him feel like it".

Erik Beaston of Bleacher Report praised the event, giving the Rollins-Corbin match the highest grading of A+, quoting "This was an outstanding example of the theatricality of professional wrestling and a throwback to an era when storytelling was as integral a part of any given match as the ring work itself", and the SmackDown Tag Team Title Match and the New Day vs. Kevin Owens and Sami Zayn both received the second-highest grade of A. The Raw Women's Championship Match received the lowest grading of C, quoting "This was a match in which it never felt like the competitors were on the same page. The action was disjointed, the psychology wonky at times and the finish came from out of nowhere".

The event received 11,000 pay-per-view purchases, but live attendance was one of the lowest of WWE's PPV history. Due to the low attendance, the TV side of the arena was tarped off in order to make the arena look more full during the television broadcast of the event.

== Aftermath ==
This would be the only Stomping Grounds event for WWE, as Backlash was reinstated for June the following year.

=== Raw ===
The following night on Raw, a brawl broke out between Universal Champion Seth Rollins, Raw Women's Champion Becky Lynch, Baron Corbin, and Lacey Evans. This led to a last chance winners take all mixed tag team extreme rules match for both the Universal and Raw Women's championships being scheduled for Extreme Rules.

Roman Reigns faced Shane McMahon and Drew McIntyre in a handicap match. Shane and McIntyre dominated Reigns until The Undertaker came to his aid, setting up a no holds barred tag team match at Extreme Rules.

=== SmackDown ===
On SmackDown, Dolph Ziggler faced WWE Champion Kofi Kingston in a two out of three falls match in order to be inserted into the championship match at Extreme Rules, but was unsuccessful.

Nikki Cross apologized to Alexa Bliss, feeling that it was her fault that Bliss lost. On SmackDown, wild card guest Cross defeated Bayley to earn Bliss a rematch for the SmackDown Women's Championship at Extreme Rules.

Heavy Machinery (Otis and Tucker) earned another opportunity for the SmackDown Tag Team Championship at Extreme Rules by defeating the team of Kevin Owens and Dolph Ziggler.

=== 205 Live ===
On 205 Live, Tony Nese defeated Akira Tozawa to earn a rematch against Drew Gulak for the WWE Cruiserweight Championship at Extreme Rules.

== Results ==
No.	Results	Stipulations	Times
1^{P}	Drew Gulak defeated Tony Nese (c) and Akira Tozawa by pinfall	Triple threat match for the WWE Cruiserweight Championship	11:20
2	Becky Lynch (c) defeated Lacey Evans by submission	Singles match for the WWE Raw Women's Championship	11:30
3	Kevin Owens and Sami Zayn defeated The New Day (Big E and Xavier Woods) by pinfall	Tag team match	11:05
4	Ricochet defeated Samoa Joe (c) by pinfall	Singles match for the WWE United States Championship	12:25
5	Daniel Bryan and Rowan (c) defeated Heavy Machinery (Otis and Tucker) by pinfall	Tag team match for the WWE SmackDown Tag Team Championship	14:25
6	Bayley (c) defeated Alexa Bliss (with Nikki Cross) by pinfall	Singles match for the WWE SmackDown Women's Championship	10:35
7	Roman Reigns defeated Drew McIntyre (with Shane McMahon) by pinfall	Singles match	17:20
8	Kofi Kingston (c) defeated Dolph Ziggler by escaping the cage	Steel Cage match for the WWE Championship	20:00
9	Seth Rollins (c) defeated Baron Corbin by pinfall	No Countout, No Disqualification match for the WWE Universal Championship; Lacey Evans was the special guest referee.	18:25
(c) / – the champion(s) heading into the match; P / – the match was broadcast on the pre-show
