= Extreme Rules (2019) =

WWE pay-per-view and livestreaming event

- Promotional poster featuring Becky Lynch and Seth Rollins
- Promotion: WWE
- Brand(s): Raw; SmackDown; 205 Live
- Date: July 14, 2019
- City: Philadelphia, Pennsylvania
- Venue: Wells Fargo Center
- Attendance: 12,800

WWE event chronology
← Previous; Stomping Grounds	Next → Smackville

Extreme Rules chronology
← Previous; 2018	Next → The Horror Show

The 2019 Extreme Rules was a professional wrestling pay-per-view (PPV) and livestreaming event produced by WWE, held for wrestlers from the promotion's main roster brands, Raw, SmackDown, and 205 Live. It was the 11th annual Extreme Rules event and took place on July 14, 2019, at the Wells Fargo Center in Philadelphia, Pennsylvania. The theme of the event was that it featured various hardcore-based matches.

Thirteen matches were contested at the event, including two on the Kickoff pre-show. Only three of the main card's matches were contested under a hardcore stipulation. In an impromptu main event, Brock Lesnar cashed in his Money in the Bank contract on Seth Rollins to win Raw's Universal Championship for a record-setting third time. This occurred right after the scheduled main event, in which Rollins and Raw Women's Champion Becky Lynch retained their respective titles against Baron Corbin and Lacey Evans in a Last Chance Winners Take All Extreme Rules mixed tag team match. In other prominent matches, Kofi Kingston retained SmackDown's WWE Championship against Samoa Joe, AJ Styles defeated Ricochet to win Raw's United States Championship for a third time, The New Day (Big E and Xavier Woods) defeated Heavy Machinery (Otis and Tucker) and defending champions Daniel Bryan and Rowan to win the SmackDown Tag Team Championship for a record-tying fourth time, and in the opening bout, The Undertaker and Roman Reigns defeated Shane McMahon and Drew McIntyre in a No Holds Barred tag team match, which was ultimately Undertaker's final match in front of a live audience in the United States before his retirement in 2020.

== Production ==
=== Background ===
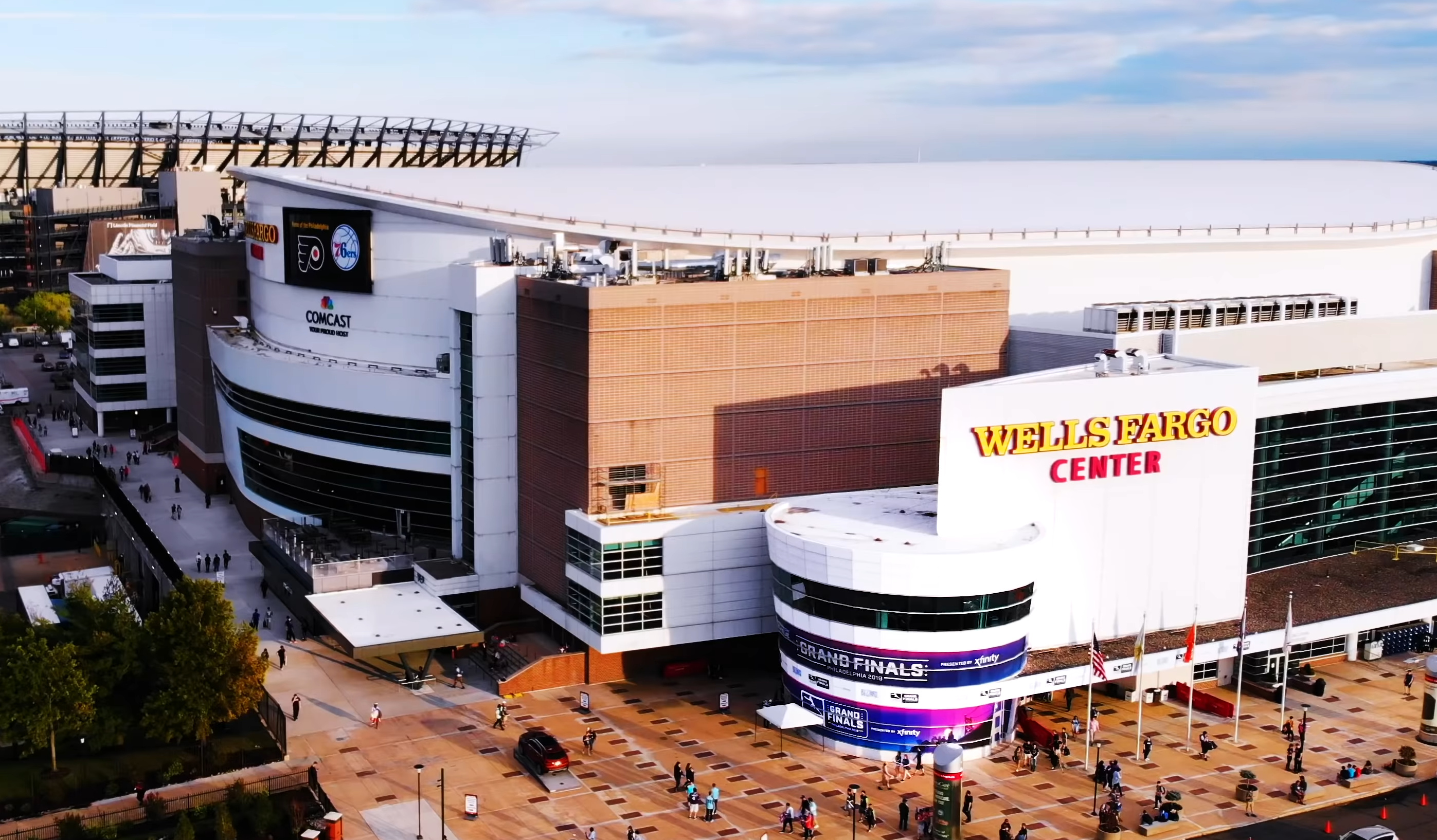
The 11th annual Extreme Rules event was held at the Wells Fargo Center in Philadelphia, Pennsylvania.

Extreme Rules was an annual professional wrestling event produced by WWE since 2009. It was originally broadcast exclusively via pay-per-view (PPV) before it began simultaneously livestreaming on the WWE Network in 2014. The concept of the event was that it featured various matches that were contested under hardcore rules and generally featured one Extreme Rules match. The defunct Extreme Championship Wrestling (ECW) promotion, which WWE acquired in 2003, originally used the "extreme rules" term to describe the regulations for all of its matches; WWE adopted the term, using it in place of "hardcore match" or "hardcore rules".

As first reported on March 4, 2019, and later confirmed on March 18, the 11th Extreme Rules event was scheduled to be held on July 14, 2019, at the Wells Fargo Center in Philadelphia, Pennsylvania, featuring wrestlers from the Raw, SmackDown, and 205 Live brand divisions. Tickets went on sale on March 29. Philadelphia was the home of the former ECW promotion from 1993 to 2001.

=== Storylines ===
The event comprised 13 matches, including two on the Kickoff pre-show, that resulted from scripted storylines. Results were predetermined by WWE's writers on the Raw, SmackDown, and 205 Live brands, while storylines were produced on WWE's weekly television shows, Monday Night Raw, SmackDown Live, and the cruiserweight-exclusive 205 Live.

At Stomping Grounds, Becky Lynch retained the Raw Women's Championship against Lacey Evans, and later that night, Seth Rollins defended the Universal Championship against Baron Corbin with a special guest referee of Corbin's choice. Corbin chose Evans, who changed the match to a no countout, no disqualification match and Evans eventually attacked Rollins, prompting Lynch to come to his aid. Rollins subsequently retained his title. The following night on Raw, Corbin and Evans brawled with Rollins and Lynch and challenged them to a mixed tag team match. Rollins and Lynch agreed as long as it would mean the end of their respective feuds, while Corbin and Evans insisted that their opponents put their respective titles on the line. As a result, a last chance winners take all mixed tag team match for both the Universal and Raw Women's championships was scheduled for Extreme Rules, with an extreme rules stipulation added the following week.

After Ricochet won the United States Championship at Stomping Grounds, Luke Gallows, Karl Anderson, and AJ Styles interrupted a photoshoot, congratulating the new champion. The following night on Raw, Styles defeated Ricochet in a non-title match, and following the match, Styles and Ricochet showed mutual respect to each other. In a title match the following week, Ricochet retained against Styles. After the match, Gallows and Anderson attempted to enter the ring and taunted Styles, who held them off, only to attack Ricochet himself, turning heel. Gallows and Anderson also joined in on the attack, reuniting The Club, and another title match between Ricochet and Styles was scheduled for Extreme Rules.

At Super ShowDown, Braun Strowman defeated Bobby Lashley. On the June 17 episode of Raw, Strowman eliminated Lashley from a fatal five-way elimination match for an opportunity at the United States Championship; Lashley in turn helped in Strowman's elimination. The following week, Lashley attacked Strowman after losing a tug of war match. A falls count anywhere match on the July 1 episode ended in a no contest after Strowman tackled Lashley through the LED video wall of the entrance and both were taken to a local medical facility. A Last Man Standing match between the two was then scheduled for Extreme Rules.

On the Super ShowDown Kickoff pre-show, The Usos (Jey Uso and Jimmy Uso) defeated The Revival (Scott Dawson and Dash Wilder). On the following episode of Raw, The Revival defeated former champions Curt Hawkins and Zack Ryder and The Usos to win the Raw Tag Team Championship. After more feuding on subsequent episodes, The Revival were scheduled to defend the championship against The Usos at Extreme Rules.

At Super ShowDown, Shane McMahon defeated Roman Reigns thanks to interference from Drew McIntyre. This led to a match between Reigns and McIntyre at Stomping Grounds that Reigns won, despite Shane's multiple attempts to distract Reigns. On the following Raw, Shane and McIntyre dominated wild card guest Reigns in a handicap match until The Undertaker appeared and attacked both Shane and McIntyre. A tag team match featuring Reigns and Undertaker against Shane and McIntyre was then scheduled for Extreme Rules, which was made a No Holds Barred match the following week.

On the June 24 episode of Raw, after WWE Champion Kofi Kingston defeated both Kevin Owens and Sami Zayn in consecutive singles matches (both Kingston and Owens appearing via the wild card rule), Kingston was randomly attacked by Samoa Joe, who performed a uranage on Kingston. As referees tended to Kingston, Joe returned and applied the Coquina Clutch on him. Kingston was subsequently scheduled to defend the WWE Championship against Joe at Extreme Rules. On the following SmackDown, Dolph Ziggler, whom Kingston defeated to retain the title at Stomping Grounds, faced Kingston in a two out of three falls match in which if Ziggler won, he would have been added to the championship match, however, he was unsuccessful.

At Stomping Grounds, Bayley retained the SmackDown Women's Championship against Raw's Alexa Bliss. Nikki Cross, who was in Bliss' corner, felt it was her fault that Bliss lost as she tried attacking Bayley during the match. On the following SmackDown, wild card guest Cross defeated Bayley, thus earning Bliss a rematch for the title at Extreme Rules. On the July 8 episode of Raw, Cross and wild card guest Bayley both competed in a Beat the Clock Challenge with the winner deciding the stipulation of Bayley and Bliss' championship match. Cross won and decided that the championship match would be a handicap match with Cross teaming with Bliss against Bayley.

At Stomping Grounds, Daniel Bryan and Rowan retained the SmackDown Tag Team Championship against Heavy Machinery (Otis and Tucker). On the following SmackDown, The New Day's Big E and Xavier Woods defeated Bryan and Rowan in a non-title match, thus earning a title match at Extreme Rules. The following week, Heavy Machinery were added to the title match after defeating the team of Kevin Owens and Dolph Ziggler, thus changing the title match into a triple threat tag team match.

Since being drafted to SmackDown during the 2019 WWE Superstar Shake-up in April, Aleister Black began appearing in ominous backstage promos in a dark room, awaiting a challenger. On the June 25 episode of SmackDown, there was a knock on Black's door, indicating that someone had accepted his challenge. The following week, however, Black stated that no one was at his door when he answered and said he would be waiting for them at Extreme Rules. On the July 9 episode, Raw's Cesaro was revealed as the mystery challenger.

On the Stomping Grounds Kickoff pre-show, Drew Gulak defeated former champion Tony Nese and Akira Tozawa in a triple threat match by pinning Tozawa to win the WWE Cruiserweight Championship. On the following episode of 205 Live, Nese defeated Tozawa to earn a rematch against Gulak on the Extreme Rules Kickoff pre-show.

On the June 25 episode of SmackDown, Intercontinental Champion Finn Bálor talked about his title reign backstage when he was interrupted by Shinsuke Nakamura, who state that he would be going after the title. On the July 9 episode, Nakamura defeated Bálor in a non-title match. The day of the event, a title match between the two was scheduled for the Kickoff pre-show.

On the July 9 episode of SmackDown, Dolph Ziggler took exception to referring to Kevin Owens as his partner the previous week. Owens and Ziggler then fought each other in the parking lot, and Owens got involved in Ziggler's match that night. The day of the event, a match between the two was scheduled for Extreme Rules.

== Event ==
Other on-screen personnel
Role:	Name:
English commentators	Michael Cole (Raw)
English commentators	Corey Graves (Raw/SmackDown)
English commentators	Renee Young (Raw)
English commentators	Tom Phillips (SmackDown)
English commentators	Byron Saxton (SmackDown)
English commentators	Vic Joseph (205 Live)
English commentators	Nigel McGuinness (205 Live)
English commentators	Aiden English (205 Live)
Spanish commentators	Carlos Cabrera
Spanish commentators	Marcelo Rodríguez
German commentators	Carsten Schaefer
German commentators	Tim Haber
German commentators	Calvin Knie
Ring announcers	Greg Hamilton (SmackDown/205 Live)
Ring announcers	Mike Rome (Raw)
Referees	Danilo Anfibio
Referees	Mike Chioda
Referees	John Cone
Referees	Dan Engler
Referees	Darrick Moore
Referees	Charles Robinson
Referees	Drake Wuertz
Interviewers	Charly Caruso
Interviewers	Kayla Braxton
Interviewers	Sarah Schreiber
Pre-show panel	Jonathan Coachman
Pre-show panel	Charly Caruso
Pre-show panel	Sam Roberts
Pre-show panel	Beth Phoenix

=== Pre-show ===
Two matches were contested on the Extreme Rules Kickoff pre-show. In the first match, Finn Bálor defended SmackDown's Intercontinental Championship against Shinsuke Nakamura. In the end, Bálor missed a Coup de Grâce, which allowed Nakamura to perform a Kinshasa on Bálor to win the title.

In the second and final pre-show match, Drew Gulak defended 205 Live's WWE Cruiserweight Championship against Tony Nese. Gulak performed an Argentine Neckbreaker on Nese to retain the title.

=== Preliminary matches ===
The actual pay-per-view opened with The Undertaker and Roman Reigns facing Shane McMahon and Drew McIntyre in a No Holds Barred tag team match. Midway through the match, as The Undertaker attempted a Last Ride on Shane, Elias intervened and attacked The Undertaker. Reigns attempted to fend off Elias, only for McIntyre to perform Claymore Kicks on both Reigns and The Undertaker. Shane then went to the top rope and performed a diving elbow drop on Undertaker through the English announce table. Back in the ring, with a trashcan positioned on The Undertaker, Shane performed a Coast-to-Coast, however, before Shane could pin The Undertaker, The Undertaker performed his signature sit-up. The Undertaker then performed Chokeslams on Shane and Elias. As McIntyre attempted to perform another Claymore on The Undertaker, Reigns intercepted him with a Spear. Afterwards, Reigns threw Shane into The Undertaker, who performed a "Tombstone Piledriver" on Shane to win the match. Afterwards, The Undertaker gave a nod of approval to Reigns, and told him "it's your yard."

Next, The Revival (Scott Dawson and Dash Wilder) defended the Raw Tag Team Championship against The Usos (Jey Uso and Jimmy Uso). In the end, The Revival performed the Shatter Machine on Jimmy to retain the titles.

After that, SmackDown's Aleister Black faced Raw's Cesaro. In the end, as Cesaro went for a Neutralizer, Black countered and performed the Black Mass to win the match.

In the fourth match, Bayley defended the SmackDown Women's Championship in a handicap match against Raw's Alexa Bliss and Nikki Cross. In the end, Bayley countered Bliss' Twisted Bliss by raising her knees and performed a Diving Elbow Drop on Cross to retain the title.

In the fifth match, Bobby Lashley faced Braun Strowman in a Last Man Standing match. During the match, as Strowman ran around the ring, Lashley intercepted him with a Spear. They then fought into the crowd and into the concourse area. There, Strowman suplexed him into a wall. When the fight returned back to the crowd, Lashley sent Strowman through the barricade. Lashley then ran around the ring to send Strowman through the German announce table. Lashley then flipped it over, but Strowman stood before the ten count. Lashley then leapt over the barricade, only for Strowman to catch him and send him over the international announcer's tables. In the closing moments, after Lashley and Strowman fought up the steps at a different part of the arena, Strowman performed a powerslam on Lashley from an elevated platform. Strowman got to his feet, but Lashley was unable to make the ten count, thus Strowman won the match.

After that, Daniel Bryan and Rowan defended the SmackDown Tag Team Championship against The New Day's Big E and Xavier Woods, and Heavy Machinery (Otis and Tucker) in a triple threat tag team match. The end came when Bryan attempted a backflip to avoid a charging Big E in the corner, who caught Bryan and tagged Woods to perform a Midnight Hour to win the titles for a record-tying fourth time.

Next, Ricochet defended Raw's United States Championship against The Club's AJ Styles (accompanied by fellow Club members Luke Gallows and Karl Anderson). Before the match began, Ricochet was attacked by The Club. During the match, Ricochet performed a Lionsault on Styles for a nearfall. Styles performed a brainbuster on Ricochet for a nearfall. Ricochet performed a Shooting Star Press on Styles and as Ricochet attempted a pin on Styles, Gallows notified the referee that Styles' leg was underneath the rope, thus voiding the pin. In the end, Anderson attempted to distract Ricochet, who fended him off. With the referee distracted by Anderson, Gallows attacked Ricochet and Styles performed the Styles Clash on Ricochet from the middle rope to win the title for a third time.

After that, Kevin Owens faced Dolph Ziggler. As soon as the match started, Owens performed a Stunner on Ziggler to win the match in about 17 seconds.

In the penultimate match, Kofi Kingston defended SmackDown's WWE Championship against Samoa Joe. During the match, Joe crushed Kingston's hand between the steel steps. Joe performed a snap Powerslam for a nearfall. Kingston performed the S.O.S. for a nearfall. In the end, Kingston performed the "Trouble in Paradise" to retain the title.

=== Main event ===
The main event was the Last Chance Winners Take All Extreme Rules mixed tag team match in which Seth Rollins and Becky Lynch defended the Universal Championship and Raw Women's Championship against Baron Corbin and Lacey Evans. Lynch and Rollins attacked Evans and Corbin with kendo sticks. Corbin performed a DDT on Rollins onto a steel chair for a nearfall. Evans performed a Moonsault on Lynch for a nearfall. As Rollins and Lynch were setting up tables outside the ring, Corbin and Evans attacked them and performed simultaneous chokeslams for a nearfall. Outside the ring, Lynch and Rollins positioned Corbin and Evans onto the previously set up tables. Lynch performed a Leg Drop on Evans while Rollins performed a Frog Splash on Corbin. Back in the ring, Rollins attempted The Stomp, but Corbin countered into a powerbomb and followed up with a Deep Six, but Lynch broke up the pin. Afterwards, Lynch sent Evans out of the ring, only to be knocked out with End of Days by Corbin. An irate Rollins then furiously attacked Corbin with a kendo stick and a steel chair, followed by three Stomps to retain both his and Lynch's respective titles.

Immediately after the match, Brock Lesnar (accompanied by Paul Heyman) came down to the ring and attacked Rollins with two German suplexes before Heyman cashed in the Money in the Bank contract on behalf of Lesnar in what would become the first successful attempt for the Universal Championship. Lesnar then performed an "F-5" on Rollins to win the championship for a record third time.

== Aftermath ==
=== Raw ===
The following night on Raw, a cross-branded all-star top 10 battle royal was contested to determine the number one contender for the Universal Championship. Seth Rollins won the match by last eliminating Randy Orton to face Brock Lesnar in a rematch for the title at SummerSlam. Subsequently, Rollins was on the receiving end of brutal attacks from Lesnar on both the July 29 and August 5 episodes, which resulted in a storyline rib injury.

Following Extreme Rules, The Club (AJ Styles, Luke Gallows, and Karl Anderson) were renamed to "The O.C." (Original Club), and Ricochet won a five-man gauntlet match on the July 29 episode of Raw to earn a rematch against Styles for the United States Championship at SummerSlam.

The Usos had another opportunity at the Raw Tag Team Championship against The Revival on the July 29 episode of Raw, but in a triple threat match that also involved Luke Gallows and Karl Anderson, who won to become the new champions.

=== SmackDown ===
On the following episode of SmackDown, Randy Orton, Samoa Joe, and Elias defeated The New Day (Kofi Kingston, Xavier Woods, and Big E) when Orton pinned Kingston. The following week, a match between Kingston and Orton for the WWE Championship was scheduled for SummerSlam. Before SummerSlam, Kingston defended the title against Dolph Ziggler and Samoa Joe in a triple threat match at WWE Smackville on July 27, and Kingston retained.

Aleister Black and Cesaro had a rematch on the following SmackDown, where Black was again victorious.

Dolph Ziggler and Kevin Owens also had a rematch on the following SmackDown, where Owens won via disqualification after interference from Shane McMahon; earlier that night, McMahon banned Owens from the building, only for Owens to show up. After the match, Owens ran away from the arena while the other wrestlers chased him as the event ended. This led to a match between Owens and McMahon being scheduled for SummerSlam under the stipulation that Owens were to quit WWE if he lost.

== Results ==
No.	Results	Stipulations	Times
1^{P}	Shinsuke Nakamura defeated Finn Bálor (c) by pinfall	Singles match for the WWE Intercontinental Championship	7:40
2^{P}	Drew Gulak (c) defeated Tony Nese by pinfall	Singles match for the WWE Cruiserweight Championship	7:25
3	The Undertaker and Roman Reigns defeated Shane McMahon and Drew McIntyre by pinfall	No Holds Barred Tag team match	17:00
4	The Revival (Scott Dawson and Dash Wilder) (c) defeated The Usos (Jey Uso and Jimmy Uso) by pinfall	Tag team match for the WWE Raw Tag Team Championship	12:35
5	Aleister Black defeated Cesaro by pinfall	Singles match	9:45
6	Bayley (c) defeated Nikki Cross and Alexa Bliss by pinfall	Handicap match for the WWE SmackDown Women's Championship	10:30
7	Braun Strowman defeated Bobby Lashley	Last Man Standing match	17:30
8	The New Day (Big E and Xavier Woods) defeated Daniel Bryan and Rowan (c) and Heavy Machinery (Otis and Tucker) by pinfall	Triple threat tag team match for the WWE SmackDown Tag Team Championship	14:00
9	AJ Styles (with Luke Gallows and Karl Anderson) defeated Ricochet (c) by pinfall	Singles match for the WWE United States Championship	16:30
10	Kevin Owens defeated Dolph Ziggler by pinfall	Singles match	0:17
11	Kofi Kingston (c) defeated Samoa Joe by pinfall	Singles match for the WWE Championship	9:45
12	Seth Rollins (Universal) and Becky Lynch (Raw Women's) defeated Baron Corbin and Lacey Evans by pinfall	Last Chance Winners Take All Extreme Rules mixed tag team match for the WWE Universal Championship and WWE Raw Women's Championship; Since Corbin and Evans lost, they could no longer challenge for Rollins and Lynch's respective titles for as long as they were champion.	19:55
13	Brock Lesnar (with Paul Heyman) defeated Seth Rollins (c) by pinfall	Singles match for the WWE Universal Championship; This was Lesnar's Money in the Bank cash-in match.	0:17
(c) / – the champion(s) heading into the match; P / – the match was broadcast on the pre-show
