= Tucker (American wrestler) =

American professional wrestler (born 1990)

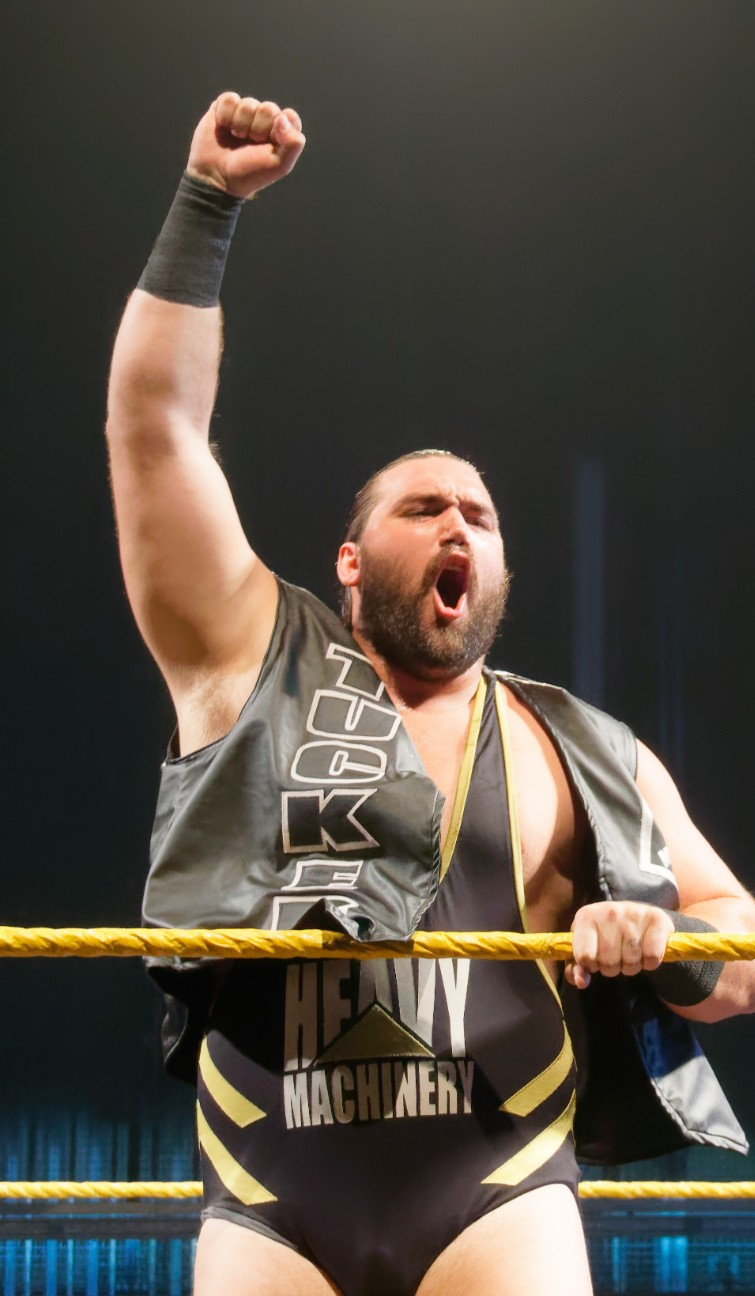
- Tucker in 2018

Personal information
- Born: Levi Rolla Cooper; July 24, 1990 (age 36) Clackamas, Oregon, U.S.
- Spouse: Ashley Cooper (m. 2016)
- Children: 1

Professional wrestling career
- Ring name(s): Levi Cooper; Tucker; Tucker Knight
- Billed height: 6 ft 3 in (1.91 m)
- Billed weight: 320 lb (150 kg)
- Billed from: Hubbard, Oregon
- Trained by: WWE Performance Center
- Debut: January 24, 2015
- Retired: October 30, 2024

Levi Rolla Cooper (born July 24, 1990) is an American retired professional wrestler. He is best known for his tenure in WWE, where he performed under the ring name Tucker. After signing with WWE in 2013, he was assigned to their developmental brand NXT, under the ring name Tucker Knight. He is best known for his partnership with Otis, as part of Heavy Machinery. He was promoted to WWE's main roster in 2019, and disbanded in 2020 as a result of the WWE Draft.

== Early life ==
Cooper attended North Marion High School where he was a successful amateur wrestler. He wrestled at collegiate level for Portland State University, California State University, Bakersfield and Arizona State University, and placed 8th at the NCAA Wrestling Championships in 2011, earning him All-America status. At ASU, he earned a degree in accounting from the W. P. Carey School of Business.

== Professional wrestling career ==
=== WWE (2013–2021) ===
==== Heavy Machinery (2013–2020) ====
In 2013, after graduating college, Cooper signed a contract with WWE and was assigned to the WWE Performance Center, where he took the ring name Tucker Knight. He made his professional wrestling debut at an NXT live event in Starke, Florida on January 24, 2015, facing Tye Dillinger in a match that resulted in a no contest. He made his television debut on the July 1 episode of NXT, working as an enhancement talent in a loss to Baron Corbin. Knight continued to make sporadic televised appearances as an enhancement talent throughout the remainder of 2015 and the start of 2016.

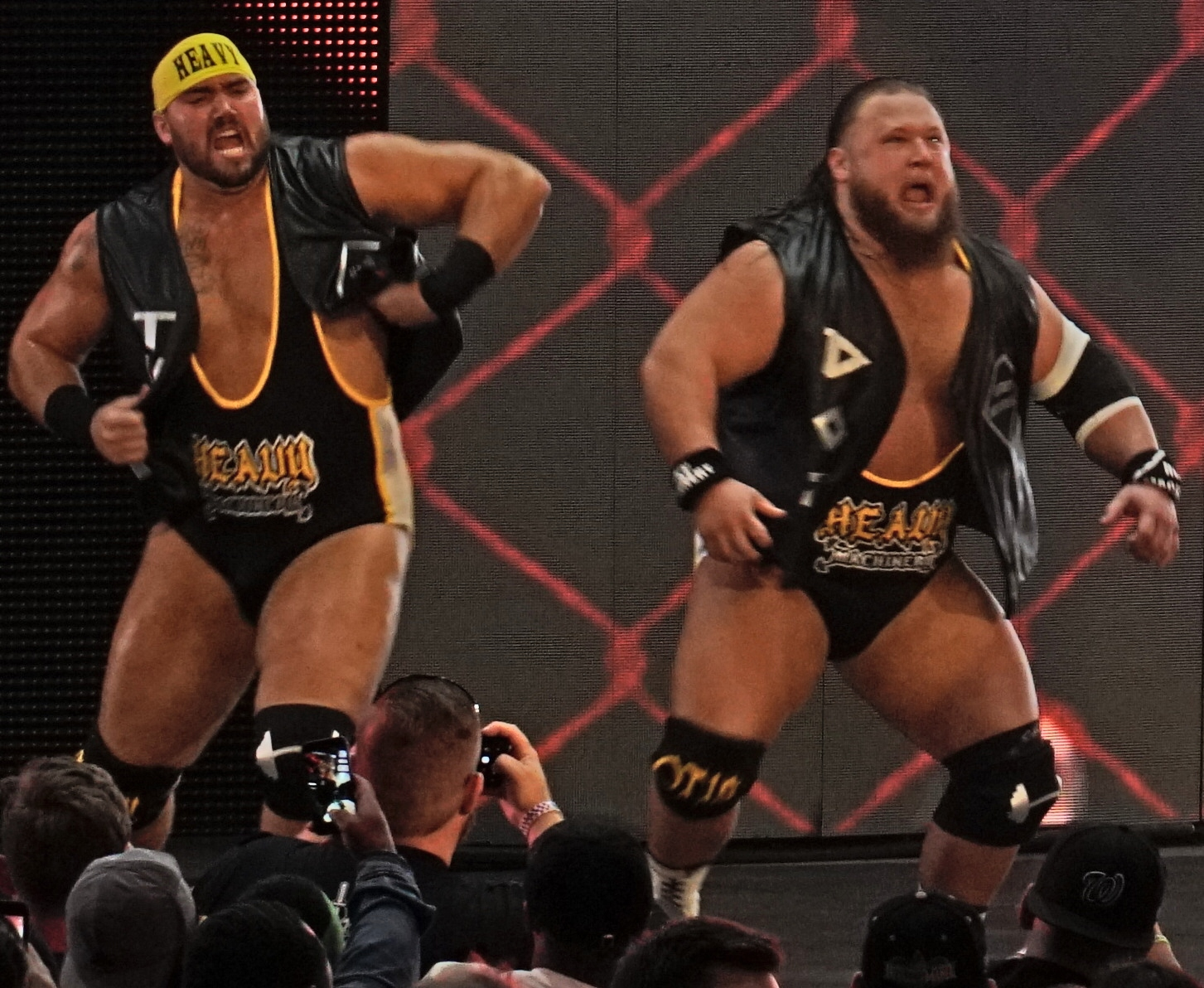
Heavy Machinery – Knight (left) and Otis Dozovic (right) in April 2018

In July 2016, Knight formed a tag team with Otis Dozovic, calling themselves Heavy Machinery. The duo participated in the Dusty Rhodes Tag Team Classic tournament, and they made their television debut on the October 19 episode of NXT, losing to the team of Austin Aries and Roderick Strong. The duo returned and had their first televised victory on the March 29, 2017 episode of NXT, defeating the team of Jonathan Ortagun and Mike Marshall. On the July 12 episode of NXT, Heavy Machinery unsuccessfully challenged The Authors of Pain (Akam and Rezar) for the NXT Tag Team Championship. In March 2018, Heavy Machinery once again participated in the Dusty Rhodes Tag Team Classic tournament, but were eliminated by The Street Profits (Angelo Dawkins and Montez Ford) in the first round. At the Greatest Royal Rumble event on April 27, 2018, Knight made his first televised main roster appearance, entering the Royal Rumble match at number 24 and eliminating Drew Gulak before being eliminated by Big E. On the December 19 episode of NXT, Heavy Machinery wrestled their final match on NXT, defeating Blake Howell and Danny D'Accardo.

On December 17, 2018, it was announced that Heavy Machinery would be debuting on the main roster. They debuted on the January 14, 2019 episode of Raw, interrupting an interview between Alexa Bliss and Paul Heyman. The following week on Raw, they defeated The Ascension (Konnor and Viktor) in their in-ring debut. In February, his ring name was shortened to Tucker, while Dozovic's ring name was shortened to Otis. The duo made their pay-per-view debut at WrestleMania 35, where they both competed in the André the Giant Memorial Battle Royal, but neither would win the match. As part of the Superstar Shake-Up, Heavy Machinery was moved to the SmackDown brand. At Stomping Grounds on June 23, Heavy Machinery faced Daniel Bryan and Rowan for the SmackDown Tag Team Championship, but were unable to win the titles. The following month at Extreme Rules, Heavy Machinery again competed for the SmackDown Tag Team Championship, this time in a triple threat tag team match involving Bryan and Rowan, and The New Day (Big E and Xavier Woods), which The New Day won. At Crown Jewel on October 31, Heavy Machinery competed in a tag team turmoil match, but were eliminated by The New Day. At Survivor Series, Heavy Machinery participated in an interbrand tag team battle royal, which was won by Dolph Ziggler and Robert Roode. At Elimination Chamber on March 8, 2020, Heavy Machinery competed in the namesake match for the SmackDown Tag Team Championship, where the champions John Morrison and the Miz retained.

==== Heel turn (2020–2021) ====
At Money in the Bank, Otis, won the Money in the Bank ladder match, earning him a world title match at the time of his choosing. In September, The Miz and John Morrison tried to steal Otis' Money in the Bank contract, but they failed on multiple attempts. During the 2020 WWE Draft, Otis remained on the SmackDown brand, while Tucker was drafted to the Raw brand. The trial over the Money in the Bank contract commenced on the October 23 episode of SmackDown, with John "Bradshaw" Layfield serving as judge and ordering that Otis would defend his Money in the Bank contract against Miz at Hell in a Cell. At the event, Tucker betrayed Otis by hitting him with the briefcase, thus turning heel and disbanding Heavy Machinery.

On the November 9 episode of Raw, Tucker won the WWE 24/7 Championship to claim his first championship within the company, but quickly lost it to Gran Metalik seconds later. He did not reappear on television until the April 9, 2021 episode of SmackDown, where he competed in the André the Giant Memorial Battle Royal. On April 15, Tucker was released from his WWE contract.

=== Independent circuit (2022–2024) ===
After being released from WWE, Cooper continued wrestling on the independent circuit under his real name, before announcing his retirement from professional wrestling on October 30, 2024.

== Other media ==
Tucker made his video game debut as a playable character in WWE 2K19 and has since appeared in WWE 2K20, WWE 2K Battlegrounds, and in WWE 2K22.

== Personal life ==
Cooper is married and the couple have a daughter born June 2018. Cooper is now a wrestling coach at Skyview High School in Vancouver, Washington.

== Championships and accomplishments ==
- Pro Wrestling Illustrated
  - Ranked No. 185 of the top 500 singles wrestlers in the PWI 500 in 2019
- WWE
  - WWE 24/7 Championship (2 times)
