= Hell in a Cell (2020) =

WWE pay-per-view and livestreaming event

- Promotional poster featuring Roman Reigns and Jey Uso with a part of the Hell in a Cell structure in the background.
- Promotion: WWE
- Brand(s): Raw; SmackDown
- Date: October 25, 2020
- City: Orlando, Florida
- Venue: WWE ThunderDome at Amway Center
- Attendance: 0 (behind closed doors) (Note: The event was held without a paying audience due to the COVID-19 pandemic in the United States, although it featured a live crowd of virtual fans via WWE's ThunderDome viewing experience.)

WWE event chronology
← Previous; NXT TakeOver 31	Next → Survivor Series

Hell in a Cell chronology
← Previous; 2019	Next → 2021

The 2020 Hell in a Cell was a professional wrestling pay-per-view (PPV) and livestreaming event produced by WWE, held for wrestlers from the promotion's main roster brands, Raw and SmackDown. It was the 12th annual Hell in a Cell event and took place on October 25, 2020, from the WWE ThunderDome, a bio-secure bubble that at the time was hosted at the Amway Center in Orlando, Florida. The event centered on the Hell in a Cell match, a 20-foot-high roofed steel cage that surrounds the ring and ringside area with no countouts or disqualifications and the only way to win is by pinfall or submission in the ring.

The event was reportedly planned to be held at the State Farm Arena in Atlanta, Georgia on October 18, but due to the COVID-19 pandemic, it was moved to the ThunderDome at the Amway Center, initially on November 1 before it was moved up to October 25. This date change was reportedly done as WWE's initial residency contract with the Amway Center expired on October 31; the date change was made before WWE extended its residency to November 24. This was subsequently the second Hell in a Cell event held in the U.S. state of Florida, after the 2013 event in Miami. It would also be the final Hell in a Cell event held during the month of October, as the 2021 event moved the series up to June, and it was the final to livestream on the American version of the WWE Network, which merged under Peacock in April 2021.

Seven matches were contested at the event, including one on the Kickoff pre-show. Three Hell in a Cell matches were contested at the event, two of which were for SmackDown while the other was for Raw. In the main event, Randy Orton defeated Drew McIntyre in a Hell in a Cell match to win Raw's WWE Championship for a 10th time, thus tying with Triple H for the second-most world title reigns overall at 14. For the other Hell in a Cell matches, Roman Reigns defeated Jey Uso to retain SmackDown's Universal Championship in the opening bout, which was also the first time an "I Quit" match was contested inside the structure, while Sasha Banks defeated Bayley to win the SmackDown Women's Championship, thus ending Bayley's record-setting title reign at 380 days. This made Banks the third WWE Women's Grand Slam Champion, as well as the fourth WWE Women's Triple Crown Winner.

The event was praised by critics for its three different Hell in a Cell championship matches, with the Universal Championship and SmackDown Women's Championship bouts receiving the most acclaim.

== Production ==
=== Background ===
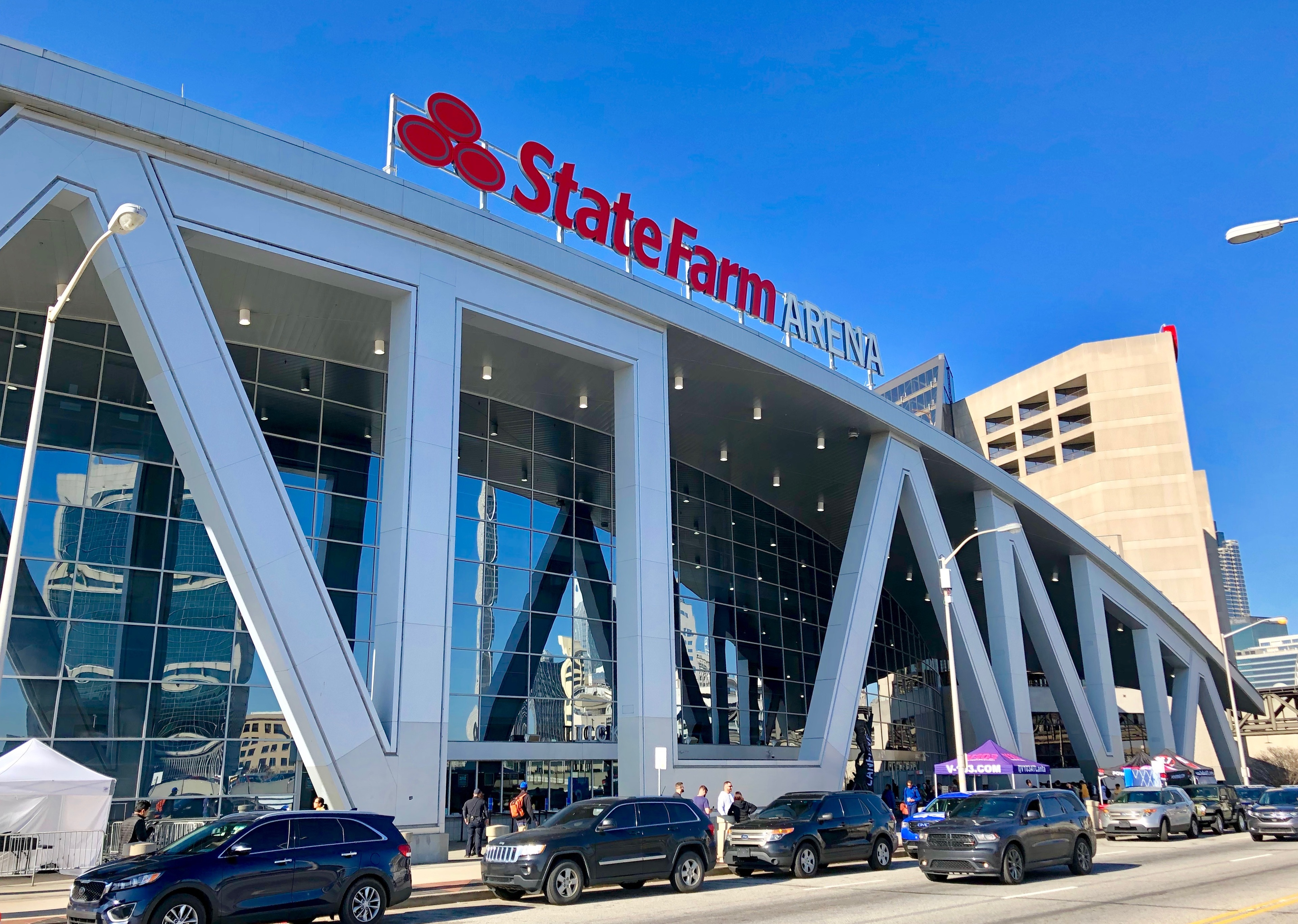
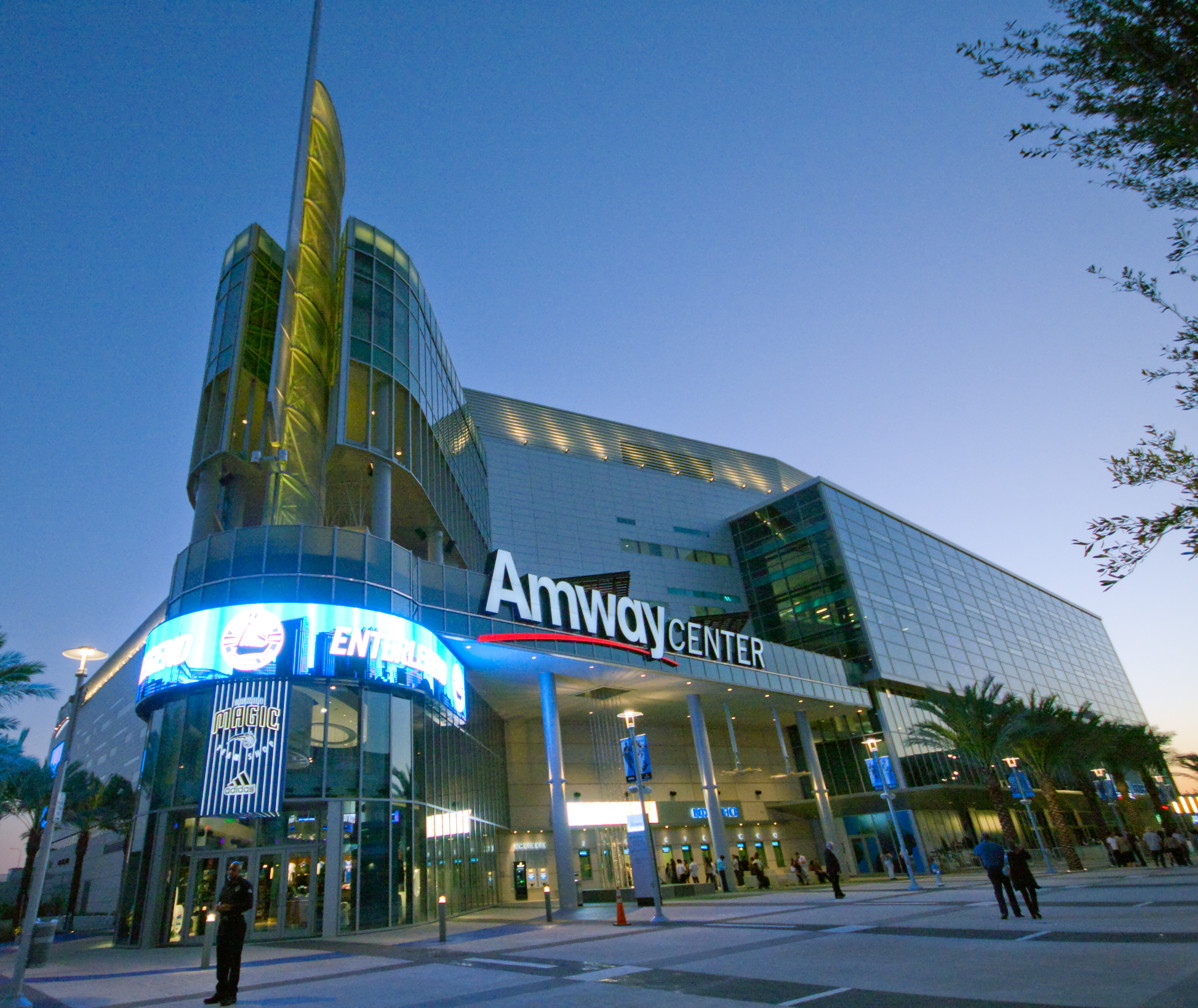
The 12th annual Hell in a Cell event was reportedly planned to be held at the State Farm Arena in Atlanta, Georgia, but due to the COVID-19 pandemic, it was produced by way of a bio-secure bubble called the WWE ThunderDome, which at the time was hosted at the Amway Center in Orlando, Florida.

Hell in a Cell was an annual professional wrestling event produced by WWE since 2009, generally held in October. It was originally broadcast exclusively via pay-per-view (PPV) before it began simultaneously livestreaming on the WWE Network in 2014. The concept of the event came from WWE's established Hell in a Cell match, in which competitors fought inside a 20-foot-high roofed cell structure surrounding the ring and ringside area. The main event match of the card was contested under the Hell in a Cell stipulation. Announced on September 1, 2020, the 12th Hell in a Cell event featured wrestlers from the Raw and SmackDown brand divisions.

==== Impact of the COVID-19 pandemic ====
As a result of the COVID-19 pandemic that began affecting the industry in mid-March, WWE had to present the majority of its programming from a behind closed doors set. Initially, Raw and SmackDown's shows were done at the WWE Performance Center in Orlando, Florida. A limited number of Performance Center trainees and friends and family members of the wrestlers were later utilized to serve as the live audience. In late August, these programs were moved to a bio-secure bubble called the WWE ThunderDome, which at the time was hosted at Orlando's Amway Center. The select live audience was no longer utilized as the bubble allowed fans to attend the events virtually for free and be seen on the nearly 1,000 LED boards within the arena. Additionally, the ThunderDome utilized various special effects to further enhance wrestlers' entrances, and arena audio was mixed with that of the chants from the virtual fans.

According to WrestleVotes, the 2020 Hell in a Cell event was planned to be held at the State Farm Arena in Atlanta, Georgia on October 18. Following its move to the ThunderDome due to the pandemic, the date was rescheduled to November 1, but on September 11, the date was moved up to October 25. This date change was reportedly done as WWE's initial residency contract with the Amway Center expired on October 31. This was subsequently the second Hell in a Cell event held in the U.S. state of Florida, after the 2013 event in Miami. The event's date change was made before WWE extended their residency contract to November 24.

=== Storylines ===
The event comprised seven matches, including one on the Kickoff pre-show, that resulted from scripted storylines. Results were predetermined by WWE's writers on the Raw and SmackDown brands, while storylines were produced on WWE's weekly television shows, Monday Night Raw and Friday Night SmackDown.

At Clash of Champions, Roman Reigns defeated Jey Uso to retain the Universal Championship after Jey's injured brother Jimmy Uso threw in the towel to stop Reigns from repeatedly assaulting Jey and forcing him to acknowledge Reigns as the Tribal Chief of the Anoaʻi family. Although Jey refused, Jimmy reluctantly acknowledged Reigns as the Tribal Chief following the match. On the following SmackDown, a celebration ceremony was held to crown Reigns as the Tribal Chief. Reigns, however, refused to be named as such due to Jey not acknowledging him and Reigns called out Jey for a talk. After Jey continued to glance at the Universal Championship, Reigns gave Jey another title shot at Hell in a Cell with "the highest stakes of any match in WWE history", which Jey accepted. The match was confirmed as a Hell in a Cell match the next day. The following week, Reigns stated he wanted to hear Jey say "I quit", turning the match into the first-ever "I Quit" match contested inside the Hell in a Cell structure. On the October 23 episode, after The Usos tricked Reigns, which resulted in Jey attacking Reigns, Reigns declared that after he would make Jey say "I quit", Jey and Jimmy would have to take orders and acknowledge Reigns as The Tribal Chief or The Usos and their immediate families would be exiled from the Anoaʻi family.

At SummerSlam, Drew McIntyre defeated Randy Orton to retain the WWE Championship. Orton earned himself a rematch for the title at Clash of Champions, where McIntyre retained once more, this time in an ambulance match. During that match, several legends whom Orton attacked over the past few months returned to seek their own vengeance against Orton, including Big Show, Christian, Shawn Michaels, and Ric Flair, who drove the ambulance. Although McIntyre celebrated with the legends on the following Raw, Orton attacked all of the legends backstage in their private lounge before the end of the show. The following week, Orton challenged McIntyre to a Hell in a Cell match for the title at the namesake event, which McIntyre accepted.

Following WrestleMania 36 in April, which saw Bayley retain her SmackDown Women's Championship in a fatal five-way elimination match involving Sasha Banks on Night 2 of the event, Banks and Bayley began teasing a potential feud between the two, with the emphasis being put on the narrative that Banks was the reason for Bayley's success and Bayley was responsible for Banks's losses. Despite the brewing dispute, Banks and Bayley won the WWE Women's Tag Team Championship in June, with Banks then winning the Raw Women's Championship in July. However, they lost the Women's Tag Team Championship at Payback and Banks lost the Raw Women's Championship at SummerSlam. After failing to win back the Women's Tag Team Championship in a rematch on the following SmackDown, Bayley turned on and brutalized Banks, disbanding their team in the process. After Bayley retained the SmackDown Women's Championship via disqualification at Clash of Champions, Banks appeared and attacked Bayley with a steel chair. On the following SmackDown, Banks challenged Bayley for the title on the following week's episode. Banks won the ensuing match via disqualification after Bayley attacked her with a steel chair. In a backstage segment, Banks challenged Bayley to another championship match at Hell in a Cell inside the eponymous structure, which was confirmed the next day.

In May, Jeff Hardy was involved in a rivalry with Sheamus, which saw the latter attempt to exploit Hardy's past issues with alcohol. During a segment on the May 29 episode of SmackDown, Sheamus framed Hardy, who was arrested after allegedly crashing his car into Elias while under the influence. This also took Elias out of action for five months. Hardy and Elias were later drafted to the Raw brand in the 2020 WWE Draft on the October 12 episode of Raw, where Elias returned and attacked Hardy, costing him his match, believing that Hardy was not framed and had actually hit him with his car. The following week, after Elias's musical segment, Hardy (who was disguised as one of Elias's band members) attempted to attack Elias, who managed to escape. In a backstage interview, Elias challenged Hardy to a match at Hell in a Cell that was made official.

In early September, The Miz and John Morrison tried to steal Otis's Money in the Bank contract that he had won at the Money in the Bank event back in May, but they failed on multiple attempts. Miz then convinced management to trade Otis's girlfriend Mandy Rose to Raw as a way to "help Otis" so he could focus on cashing in the contract, however, after insults, Otis attacked Miz and Morrison. The Miz then threatened to file a lawsuit against Otis if he did not forfeit the Money in the Bank contract. Otis, backed up by his fellow Heavy Machinery tag team partner Tucker, stated he would not forfeit the contract. During the 2020 WWE Draft, Otis remained on SmackDown while Tucker, Miz, and Morrison were all drafted to Raw. Despite being drafted to separate brands, the trial over the Money in the Bank contract commenced on the October 23 episode of SmackDown with WWE legend John "Bradshaw" Layfield (JBL) serving as judge. After the hearing, JBL initially ruled in favor of Otis, however, Miz provided last minute evidence (bribery), thus JBL changed his ruling in favor of Miz and ordered that Otis would defend his Money in the Bank contract against Miz at Hell in a Cell.

== Event ==
Other on-screen personnel
Role:	Name:
English commentators	Michael Cole (SmackDown)
English commentators	Corey Graves (SmackDown)
English commentators	Tom Phillips (Raw)
English commentators	Samoa Joe (Raw)
English commentators	Byron Saxton (Raw)
Spanish commentator	Carlos Cabrera
Ring announcers	Greg Hamilton (SmackDown)
Ring announcers	Mike Rome (Raw)
Referees	Danilo Anfibio
Referees	Jason Ayers
Referees	Shawn Bennett
Referees	Jessika Carr
Referees	Dan Engler
Referees	Darrick Moore
Referees	Eddie Orengo
Referees	Ryan Tran
Interviewers	Kayla Braxton
Interviewers	Sarah Schreiber
Pre-show panel	Charly Caruso
Pre-show panel	Jeff Jarrett
Pre-show panel	Peter Rosenberg
Pre-show panel	Booker T
Pre-show panel	Jerry Lawler

=== Pre-show ===
During the Hell in a Cell Kickoff pre-show, R-Truth defended the 24/7 Championship against Drew Gulak. In the end, Truth performed the Lie Detector on Gulak to retain the title.

Also during the pre-show, Retribution's leader Mustafa Ali challenged The Hurt Business to a match on the main show, with one member of Retribution facing one member of The Hurt Business, and allowing The Hurt Business to choose the challengers.

=== Preliminary matches ===
The actual pay-per-view opened with Roman Reigns (accompanied by Paul Heyman) defending the Universal Championship against his cousin, Jey Uso, in an "I Quit" match inside the Hell in a Cell structure. During the match, Reigns viciously attacked Jey and performed multiple Spears on him, trying to force him to quit. Midway through the match, Jey attacked Reigns with a leather strap, however, Reigns retaliated by performing a Spear on Jey, after which, he attacked Jey with the leather strap. After Reigns attacked a seemingly unconscious Jey with a flurry of blows, the referee wanted to call the match off, however, Reigns incapacitated the referee as Reigns did not want the match to end in that way. Several referees and backstage personnel, including Adam Pearce, came out and implored Reigns to stop his assault on Jey. Reigns then obtained steel stairs, placed it on top of Jey and demanded Jey to acknowledge him as the Tribal Chief. As Reigns was about to attack an unconscious Jey with the steel steps, Jey's brother, Jimmy Uso, came out and pleaded with Reigns to stop. A conflicted Reigns showed remorse for his actions. However, Reigns then applied a guillotine choke on Jimmy. Jey eventually uttered "I Quit" to prevent Reigns from inflicting more damage on Jimmy, thus the match ended and Reigns retained the title. Following the match, The Wild Samoans (Afa and Sika), Reigns' uncle and father, respectively, stood on the entrance ramp and celebrated with Reigns as the Tribal Chief while The Usos looked on from the ring.

Next, Jeff Hardy faced Elias. In the end, Hardy attacked Elias with his guitar, thus Elias won by disqualification.

After that, Otis (accompanied by Tucker) defended his Money in the Bank contract against The Miz (accompanied by John Morrison). During the match, Otis attempted a Caterpillar on Miz, however, Morrison pulled Miz from the ring. Morrison attempted to attack Otis with the briefcase, however, the referee caught Morrison and ejected him from ringside. In the end, as Otis brought Miz back in the middle of the ring, Miz held onto the ring apron. Miz knocked Otis off and while the referee was distracted by the ring apron inside the ring, Tucker turned on Otis and struck him with the briefcase. Miz then pinned Otis to win the contract.

Backstage, Miz and Morrison celebrated and Miz put Raw's WWE Champion and SmackDown's Universal Champion on notice. Tucker then appeared and was interviewed about his actions where he stated that despite being the workhorse of Heavy Machinery, he was always overlooked as Otis stole the spotlight. Otis then emerged and brawled with Tucker.

In the fourth match, Bayley defended the SmackDown Women's Championship against Sasha Banks in a Hell in a Cell match. Bayley wielded a chair during her entrance and as the Cell lowered, Bayley attempted to attack Banks with the chair, however, Banks kicked the chair out of the ring and out of the Cell. Both utilized several weapons during the match, including chairs, kendo sticks, a table, and a ladder. Banks performed a Meteora on Bayley several times. Banks performed her own Bayley-to-Belly on Bayley onto a ladder for a nearfall. Bayley retaliated with a Bayley-to-Belly on Banks for a near-fall. In the climax, Banks placed Bayley's head in a steel chair and applied the Bank Statement on Bayley while stomping on the chair and forced Bayley to submit to win the title. After which, Banks posed on Bayley with one foot on her chest holding her newly won title. As a result of her win, Banks also became the third Women's Grand Slam and fourth Women's Triple Crown Champion.

Backstage, The Hurt Business accepted Retribution's challenge that was made on the pre-show. They decided that United States Champion Bobby Lashley would face Retribution's Slapjack with Lashley also defending his title. MVP also declared that there would be no cornermen in the match, barring himself, Cedric Alexander, and Shelton Benjamin from Lashley's corner and the other members of Retribution from Slapjack's. In what became the penultimate match, Lashley forced Slapjack to tap out to the Hurt Lock to retain the title. Following the match, Retribution came out and attacked Lashley only for The Hurt Business to come out and even the odds.

=== Main event ===
In the main event, Drew McIntyre defended the WWE Championship against Randy Orton in a Hell in a Cell match. During McIntyre's entrance, Orton (disguised as a cameraman) attempted to attack McIntyre; however, McIntyre fought back. After brawling around the Cell, McIntyre and Orton eventually fought inside the Cell and the match officially started. Orton dominated early by attacking McIntyre's injured jaw. Later, Orton used bolt cutters to cut the chain off the cell door. As Orton began walking up the ramp, he was attacked from behind by McIntyre. Both men scaled the Cell onto the roof where Orton attacked McIntyre with a lead pipe. As both men climbed down the Cell, Orton sent McIntyre crashing through the announce table. Back in the ring, McIntyre countered the RKO into a Claymore Kick, only for Orton to roll out of the ring. In the closing moments, as McIntyre attempted a second Claymore Kick, Orton countered with the RKO to win his tenth WWE Championship, and tying Triple H for the second most world championships overall at 14.

== Reception ==
The Universal and SmackDown Women's championship matches were praised, as well as the WWE Championship match, which critics said was the lowest rated Hell in a Cell match of the three, while the other matches received mixed-to-negative reviews.

Brent Brookhouse and Adam Silverstein of CBS Sports stated that three Hell in a Cell matches would usually make Hell in a Cell feel stale, but "the company avoided falling into that trap by holding three matches that were drastically different despite taking place inside the same structure". For the Universal Championship match, they gave it a grade of B, stating that it was "a lot of good stuff, but far too much talking during the match and ham-fisted drama that served as a bit of a setback for a feud that has been so good". The WWE Championship match was also given the same grade; Brookhouse and Silverstein stated that "aside from the somewhat forced "cell crash spot" that has to happen every year, this was a solid match, though it had a lot to live up to match the earlier two matches in the Cell", and that "it was the third best of the three, but still a perfectly good match". For the SmackDown Women's Championship match, it was given an A grade, the highest of the event. Brookhouse and Silverstein stated that "this was a brutal match, fully of really great moments and drama. Aside from being a bit clunky early on, it was as good as you could ask for from these women".

Erik Beaston of Bleacher Report gave the Universal Championship match a grade of A+, the highest of the event, stating that all that mattered was "the story being told between the two individuals in the ring". He continued by stating that "being able to hear every word they said to each other made everything feel so much more personal", which "added weight to an already heavy situation". Beaston stated that "this is one of the best storylines WWE has done in 2020, and it's because Uso and Reigns have made it special". It may not have been the best Hell in a Cell match, "but it may have been the best story told inside it", and Beaston concluded by stating that "the physicality was just as important as the tale". The WWE Championship match was given a B+ grade, with Beaston stating that it was "the most methodical and, in some ways, the most traditional". Although it was the weakest of the three Hell in a Cell matches, it was "good on its own terms", and that "Orton winning means this feud might continue for another month, but McIntyre was better when he was chasing the title, so it might not be so bad if they have one more showdown". The SmackDown Women's Championship match was given a grade of A; Beaston stated that "Bayley and Banks made better use of the Hell in a Cell stipulation to put on a violent and competitive match", and that "the way they used various weapons they found under the ring was both creative and brutal". Banks and Bayley "have had many classic encounters over the years, and this was another one to add to the list. Clips from this match will be in their eventual Hall of Fame video packages". Beaston concluded by stating that "there were a couple of odd moments but, as a whole, this match exceeded what were already high expectations. Banks winning was the right call, especially if this feud is going to continue".

Wade Keller of Pro Wrestling Torch gave the Universal Championship match 4.25 stars, calling it "really dramatic and well performed". It may not have been a "traditional classic match, but it wasn't aiming to be, and because of that, it really didn't wear out the Cell as a setting for a violent match, so it fit into the show nicely in that way". The Usos, Paul Heyman, and Roman Reigns "were spot on with their performances", and Keller stated that "the most was asked of Reigns", who "seems a lot more creatively engaged now than the one-dimensional rejected babyface act he was shoved into for so many years". Keller gave the WWE Championship match 3.25 stars, stating that he "wasn't expecting an Orton win" and that "the match itself was pretty slow for the first two-thirds, but the trip to the roof and the drama at the end with a surprise finish helped elevate it", but it was "too long and pretty plodding". Keller gave the SmackDown Women's Championship match 4.25 stars, stating that it was a "really good" and "dramatic match" and that it was "violent without seeming to go too far where the big spots stopped really resonating or counting".

The highest rated matches on the card, according to Dave Meltzer, were the SmackDown Women's Championship and WWE Championship matches, which received 4.25 stars. The Universal Championship match received 3.5 stars, The Miz vs. Otis match received 2 stars, the Kickoff pre-show match received 1.75 stars, the Elias vs. Jeff Hardy match received 1 star, and the United States Championship match received 0.5 stars.

== Aftermath ==
The 2020 event would be the final Hell in a Cell to take place in October, as the following year, the event was moved up to June. This was also the final Hell in a Cell event to livestream on the American version of the WWE Network, which merged under Peacock in April 2021.

=== Raw ===
On the following night's episode of Raw, Drew McIntyre opened the show, stating that he would regain the WWE Championship again. He was interrupted by the new Mr. Money in the Bank, The Miz (accompanied by John Morrison). Miz taunted McIntyre on losing the title and also gloated about winning the Money in the Bank contract from Otis. The two faced each other later that night where McIntyre defeated Miz. Later that night, new WWE Champion Randy Orton was a guest on "A Moment of Bliss", where Alexa Bliss (who had aligned herself with Bray Wyatt and his alter-ego The Fiend) referenced Orton's past rivalry with Wyatt (their rivalry leading into WrestleMania 33, during which Orton set the Wyatt compound ablaze). McIntyre then came out and attacked Orton until the lights went out, signaling The Fiend. When the lights illuminated, The Fiend was standing behind Orton on the entrance ramp while McIntyre stood in the ring. McIntyre continued to brawl with Orton while The Fiend departed. On the November 16 episode of Raw, McIntyre defeated Orton to regain the title.

Also on the following Raw, The Hurt Business (MVP, United States Champion Bobby Lashley, Shelton Benjamin, and Cedric Alexander) faced Retribution (Mustafa Ali, Slapjack, T-Bar, and Mace) in an eight-man tag team elimination match. In the climax, the match came down to Benjamin and Alexander of The Hurt Business and Ali of Retribution. Ali attacked Alexander with a steel chair. Ali was disqualified thus Retribution lost the match.

Also on the following night's Raw, focus shifted towards WWE's next pay-per-view, Survivor Series. Both Jeff Hardy and Elias participated in the qualifying matches for Team Raw that night; Hardy lost his qualifier match, and then later distracted Elias, which caused him to lose his match. Hardy then attacked Elias with Elias' own guitar following the match. The following week, Hardy defeated Elias in a guitar on a pole match.

=== SmackDown ===
Universal Champion Roman Reigns (accompanied by Paul Heyman) opened the following episode of SmackDown, alongside Jey Uso. Jey stated that he despised Reigns for his actions, however, Reigns stated he did what he had to do. Reigns then gave Jey until the end of the night to fall in line and take orders or be exiled from the family. Later that night, Jey faced Daniel Bryan in a Survivor Series qualifier match for Team SmackDown. Reigns came out midway through the match and watched on from ringside. After Jey defeated Bryan, Jey finally accepted Reigns as the Tribal Chief. Jey then attacked a defenseless Bryan and put him through an announce table, which pleased Reigns.

Over two and a half years following this, The Usos reignited their feud with Reigns; they pinned him in a Bloodline Civil War tag team match at Money in the Bank in July 2023. This led to a Tribal Combat match between Jey and Reigns at SummerSlam for the Undisputed WWE Universal Championship and recognition as the Tribal Chief of the Anoaʻi family, where Reigns was victorious.

Also on the following SmackDown, new SmackDown Women's Champion Sasha Banks celebrated her victory and stated that with Bayley now in her past, she would go on to defeat Raw Women's Champion Asuka at Survivor Series. Bayley then interrupted Banks and taunted her on how she can never successfully retain her championships after winning them, after which she proceeded to challenge Banks to a title rematch the following week, which Banks accepted. On the subsequent episode, Banks broke her string of unsuccessful singles title defenses and defeated Bayley to retain the title.

== Results ==
No.	Results	Stipulations	Times
1^{P}	R-Truth (c) defeated Drew Gulak by pinfall	Singles match for the WWE 24/7 Championship	5:25
2	Roman Reigns (c) (with Paul Heyman) defeated Jey Uso	Hell in a Cell "I Quit" match for the WWE Universal Championship	29:20
3	Elias defeated Jeff Hardy by disqualification	Singles match	7:50
4	The Miz (with John Morrison) defeated Otis (with Tucker) by pinfall	Singles match for Otis's Money in the Bank contract	7:25
5	Sasha Banks defeated Bayley (c) by submission	Hell in a Cell match for the WWE SmackDown Women's Championship	26:35
6	Bobby Lashley (c) defeated Slapjack by submission	Singles match for the WWE United States Championship	3:50
7	Randy Orton defeated Drew McIntyre (c) by pinfall	Hell in a Cell match for the WWE Championship	30:35
(c) / – the champion(s) heading into the match; P / – the match was broadcast on the pre-show
