= Money in the Bank (2020) =

WWE pay-per-view and livestreaming event

- Promotional poster featuring various WWE wrestlers
- Promotion: WWE
- Brand(s): Raw; SmackDown
- Date: May 10, 2020 (Note: While the majority of the event aired live, the two Money in the Bank ladder matches were pre-recorded on April 15, 2020.)
- City: Orlando, Florida; Stamford, Connecticut (Note: The event was originally scheduled to be held at the Royal Farms Arena in Baltimore, Maryland.)
- Venue: WWE Performance Center; Titan Towers (Note: The majority of the event took place live at the WWE Performance Center in Orlando, Florida while the Money in the Bank ladder matches were pre-recorded at WWE's global headquarters at the time, Titan Towers in Stamford, Connecticut.)
- Attendance: 0 (behind closed doors) (Note: The event was held without a live audience due to the COVID-19 pandemic.)
- Tagline(s): Climb the Corporate Ladder; The Risk is Worth the Reward

WWE event chronology
← Previous; WrestleMania 36	Next → NXT TakeOver: In Your House

Money in the Bank chronology
← Previous; 2019	Next → 2021

The 2020 Money in the Bank was a professional wrestling pay-per-view (PPV) and livestreaming event produced by WWE, held for wrestlers from the promotion's main roster brands, Raw and SmackDown. It was the 11th annual Money in the Bank event and it aired on May 10, 2020. While the majority of the event aired live from the WWE Performance Center in Orlando, Florida, the dual main event was pre-recorded on April 15 at WWE's global headquarters at the time, Titan Towers in Stamford, Connecticut. The event centered on the Money in the Bank ladder match, a multi-person ladder match where the wrestlers compete to retrieve a briefcase hanging above the ring which contains a contract for a guaranteed world championship match at any time within the next year.

The event was originally scheduled to take place at the Royal Farms Arena in Baltimore, Maryland, but the venue cancelled all shows that were to be held due to the COVID-19 pandemic. In response, WWE took advantage of the situation and moved the two titular ladder matches to Titan Towers with a new "Corporate Ladder" gimmick where the match's titular briefcases were suspended above a ring on the building's roof, and they were produced as cinematic matches. The men's and women's matches occurred simultaneously where the wrestlers began on the ground floor and fought their way to the roof. This would also be the final Money in the Bank to livestream on the American version of the WWE Network, which merged under Peacock in April 2021.

Eight matches were contested at the event, including one on the Kickoff pre-show. In the main event, SmackDown's Otis and Raw's Asuka won the respective men's and women's Money in the Bank ladder matches, which were contested simultaneously, but with the women's ending first. On the following night's episode of Raw, it was revealed that the women's match was actually for the Raw Women's Championship, which was placed inside the briefcase, due to reigning champion Becky Lynch going on maternity leave, thus Asuka became the new champion, marking the first and only time a Money in the Bank ladder match directly awarded a championship instead of a championship match contract. This in turn made Asuka WWE's second Women's Grand Slam Champion and third Women's Triple Crown Champion. In the penultimate match, Drew McIntyre defeated Seth Rollins to retain Raw's WWE Championship. In other prominent matches, Braun Strowman defeated Bray Wyatt to retain SmackDown's Universal Championship and Bayley defeated Tamina to retain the SmackDown Women's Championship.

== Production ==
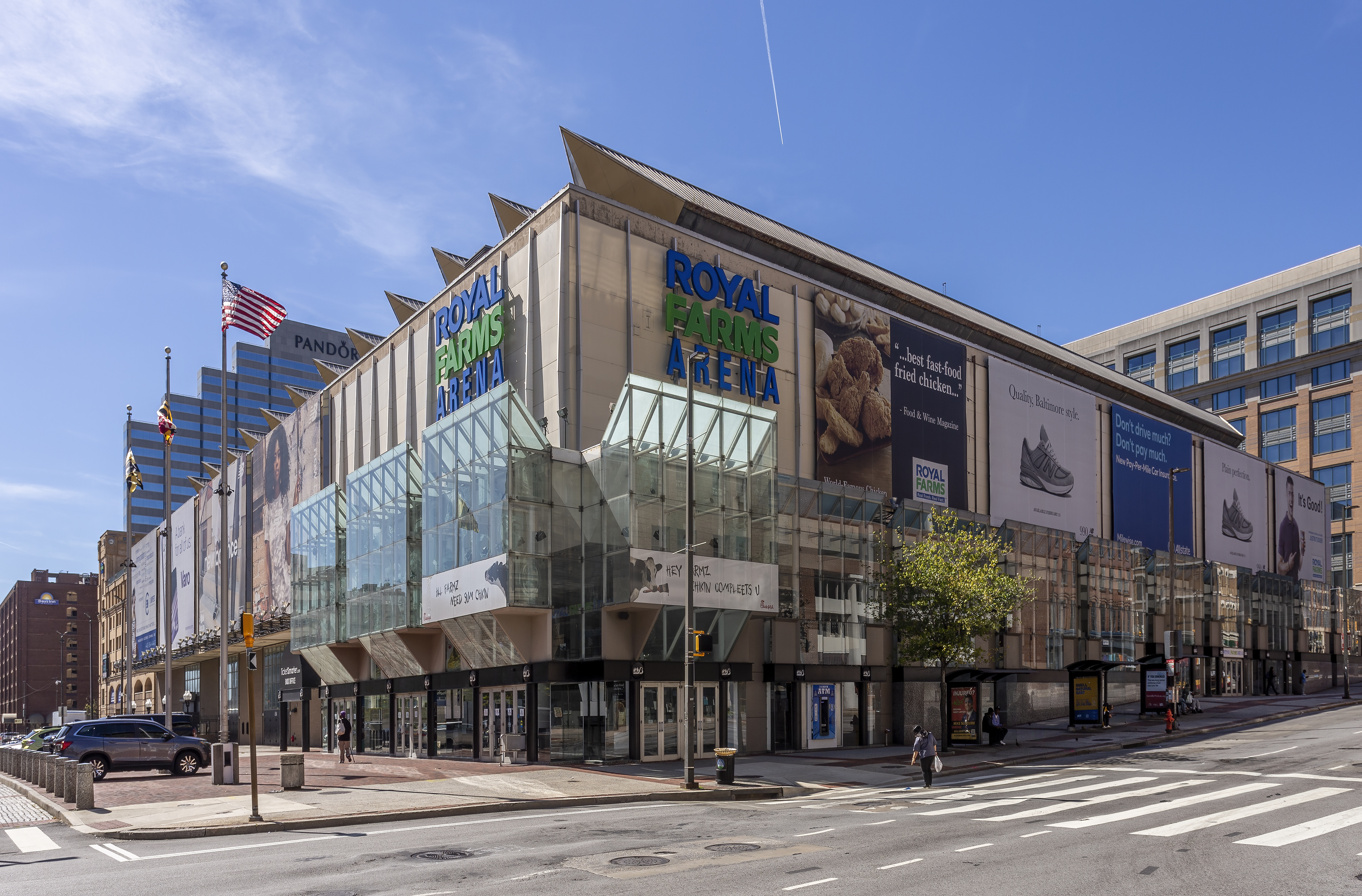
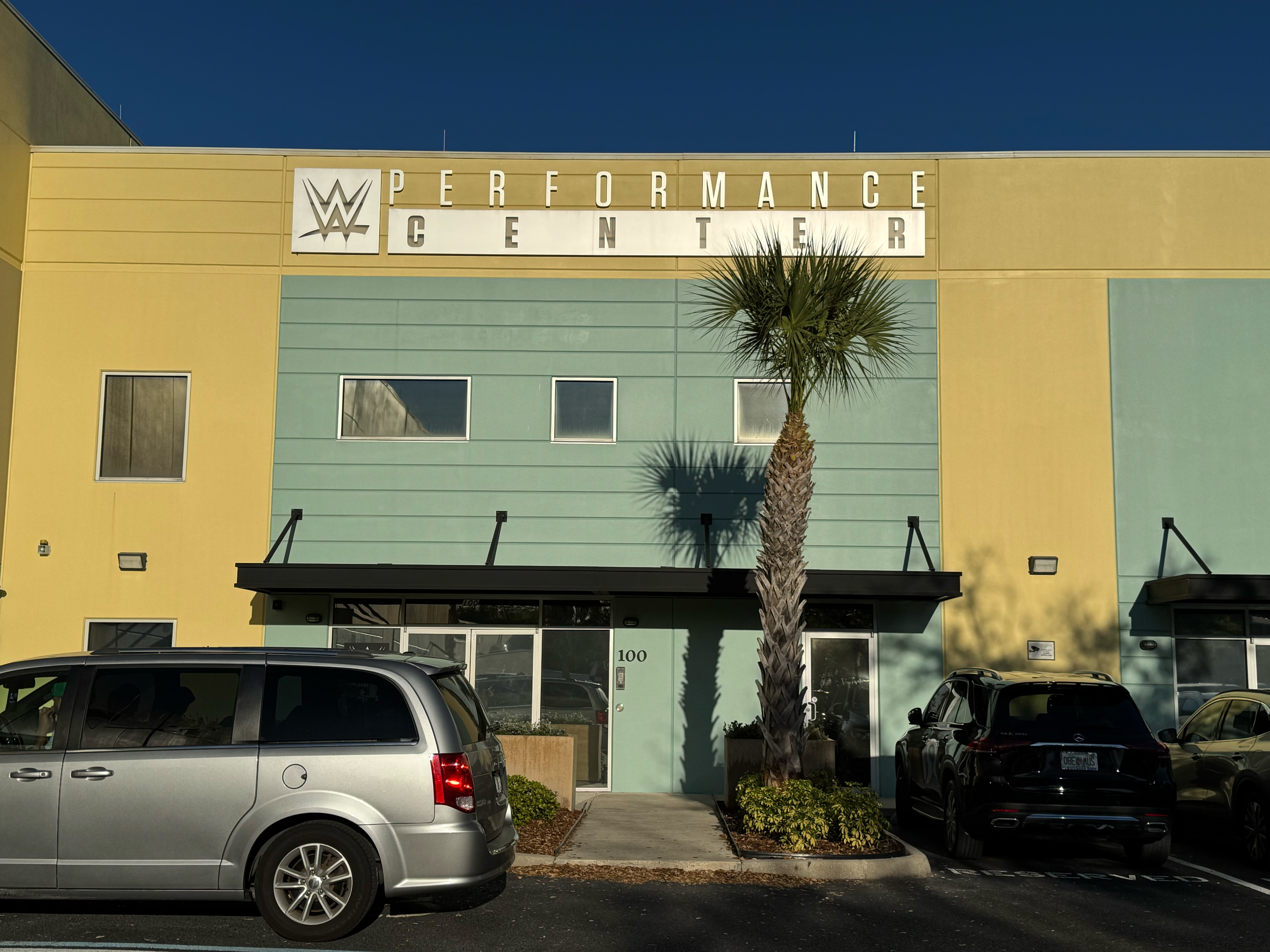
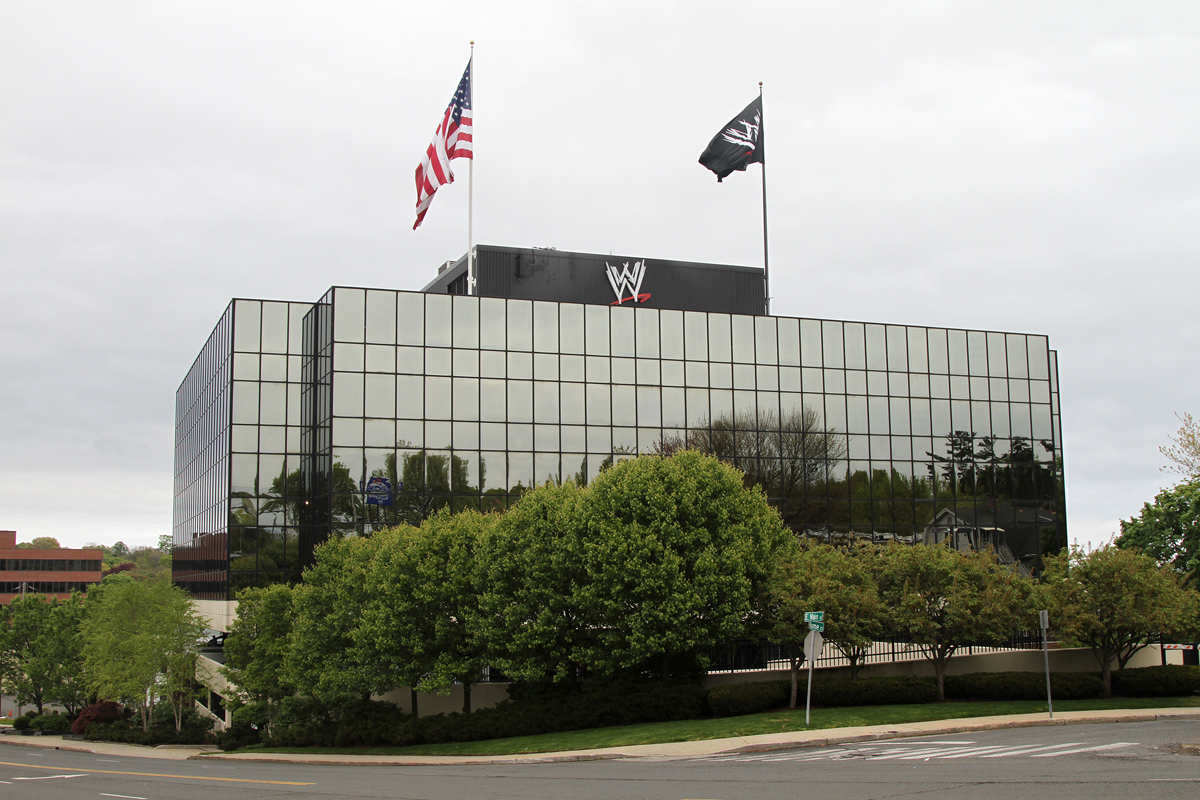
The 11th annual Money in the Bank event was originally scheduled to take place at Royal Farms Arena in Baltimore, Maryland, but due to the COVID-19 pandemic, it was relocated. Most of the event's matches were held live at the WWE Performance Center in Orlando, Florida. However, the Men's and Women's Money in the Bank ladder matches were held at WWE's corporate headquarters at the time, Titan Towers in Stamford, Connecticut.

=== Background ===
Money in the Bank is an annual professional wrestling event produced by WWE since 2010, generally held between May and July. It was originally broadcast exclusively via pay-per-view (PPV) before it began simultaneously livestreaming on the WWE Network in 2014. The concept of the event comes from WWE's established Money in the Bank ladder match, in which multiple wrestlers use ladders to retrieve a briefcase hanging above the ring. The briefcase contains a contract that guarantees the winner a match for a world championship of their choosing at any time within the next year.

Announced on March 2, 2020, the 11th Money in the Bank event featured wrestlers from the Raw and SmackDown brand divisions; male wrestlers competed for a contract to grant them a match for either Raw's WWE Championship or SmackDown's Universal Championship, while female wrestlers competed for a Raw Women's Championship or SmackDown Women's Championship match contract—though the day after the event, it was revealed that the women's match was actually for the Raw Women's Championship instead of a title match contract due to the unexpected circumstances that forced the then-Raw Women's Champion to go on hiatus.

==== Impact of the COVID-19 pandemic ====
As with WWE's other programming since March 13, 2020, the COVID-19 pandemic necessitated changes to the PPV and livestreaming event; on March 2, 2020, Money in the Bank was originally announced to be held on May 10, 2020, at the Royal Farms Arena in Baltimore, Maryland, with tickets going on sale on March 13 through Ticketmaster. However, on March 30, one week before WrestleMania 36, Maryland Governor Larry Hogan issued a stay at home order. An advertisement promoting Money in the Bank for May 10 aired during WrestleMania 36 Part 2 on April 5, but with no reference to a city or venue. Subsequently, Royal Farms Arena cancelled all events due to the pandemic and began issuing refunds.

WWE initially did not announce whether the event would still go on from a different location (such as the WWE Performance Center in Orlando, Florida where most WWE shows for Raw and SmackDown had been held since March 13), but on the April 17 episode of SmackDown, it was announced that the two Money in the Bank ladder matches would take place at WWE's global headquarters at the time, Titan Towers in Stamford, Connecticut. A new "Corporate Ladder" gimmick was also added to the matches, in which the participants had to travel from the ground floor of the building to the roof in order to locate the briefcases, which were suspended above a ring on the roof. It was also announced that the men's and women's matches would take place at the same time. With the changes in format, the number of participants in each match was also reduced to six; since the 2018 event, both the men's and women's ladder matches featured eight wrestlers that were evenly divided between the Raw and SmackDown brands. While the ladder matches were pre-recorded on April 15 as cinematic matches, it was confirmed on the day of the event that all of the other matches would take place live from the WWE Performance Center with no fans in attendance.

=== Storylines ===
The event comprised eight matches, including one on the Kickoff pre-show, which resulted from scripted storylines. Results were predetermined by WWE's writers on the Raw and SmackDown brands, while storylines were produced on WWE's weekly television shows, Monday Night Raw and Friday Night SmackDown.

At Super ShowDown, "The Fiend" Bray Wyatt lost the Universal Championship to Goldberg, who in turn lost the title to Braun Strowman during WrestleMania 36 Part 1. On the following episode of SmackDown, Wyatt interrupted Strowman after his match and reminded Strowman that it was he who brought him to WWE with his old Wyatt Family stable. He then stated he wanted his title back and Strowman accepted the challenge, which was scheduled for Money in the Bank, though against Wyatt's normal self instead of The Fiend.

Qualifying matches for the women's Money in the Bank ladder match began on the April 13 episode of Raw. Asuka, Shayna Baszler, and the returning Nia Jax qualified for the match by defeating Ruby Riott, Sarah Logan, and Kairi Sane, respectively. Dana Brooke then qualified by defeating Naomi on the April 17 episode of SmackDown. On the following week's SmackDown, Lacey Evans defeated Sasha Banks to qualify for the match. Carmella won the final spot by defeating Mandy Rose on the May 1 episode of SmackDown.

Qualifying matches for the men's Money in the Bank ladder match began on the April 17 episode of SmackDown where Daniel Bryan defeated Cesaro to qualify. On the following Raw, Aleister Black, Apollo Crews, and Rey Mysterio qualified for the match by defeating Austin Theory, Montel Vontavious Porter (MVP), and Murphy, respectively. King Corbin then qualified by defeating Drew Gulak on the April 24 episode of SmackDown. On the April 27 episode of Raw, Crews injured his left knee during his United States Championship match against Andrade, pulling him from the ladder match. Otis was the next to qualify by defeating Dolph Ziggler on the May 1 episode of SmackDown. On the May 4 episode of Raw, AJ Styles—in his first appearance since being buried alive by The Undertaker at WrestleMania—won a Last Chance gauntlet match to take the final spot vacated by Crews.

During WrestleMania 36 Part 2, Tamina was eliminated first in the fatal five-way elimination match for the SmackDown Women's Championship due to all of the other competitors piling on top of her for the pin; Bayley subsequently retained the title. On the following SmackDown, Tamina pointed out the fact that Bayley nor any other competitor in that match actually beat her and challenged Bayley to a singles match for the championship. Bayley agreed if Tamina could defeat her friend Sasha Banks, which she did the following week to earn the title match at Money in the Bank.

During WrestleMania 36 Part 1, Seth Rollins lost to Kevin Owens, while in the main event of Part 2, Drew McIntyre defeated Brock Lesnar to win the WWE Championship. On the April 13 episode of Raw, Rollins stated that by losing to Owens, he had been crucified and now had truly risen (buying into his "Monday Night Messiah" gimmick). He later attacked McIntyre following the latter's match and performed two Stomps on him. The following week, McIntyre challenged Rollins to a match at Money in the Bank with his title on the line, stating that as champion, he needed to face the best. Rollins responded, noting their similarities, such as both being former NXT Champions, as well as both defeating Lesnar to win a world championship at WrestleMania (which Rollins did twice, first at WrestleMania 31 for the WWE Championship—at that time called the WWE World Heavyweight Championship—and again at WrestleMania 35 for the Universal Championship). Rollins then accepted McIntyre's challenge.

On the April 17 episode of SmackDown, The New Day's Big E defeated Jey Uso (representing The Usos) and defending co-champion The Miz (representing himself and John Morrison) in a triple threat match to win the SmackDown Tag Team Championship for The New Day. The following week, Lucha House Party (Lince Dorado and Gran Metalik) came out to challenge New Day but were interrupted by Miz and John Morrison, who also challenged The New Day. The Forgotten Sons (Steve Cutler, Jaxson Ryker, and Wesley Blake) then made their SmackDown debut, stating they would be taking over the brand's tag team division before attacking New Day. The following week, The Forgotten Sons (Cutler and Blake) defeated The New Day (Big E and Kofi Kingston) in a non-title match where Miz and Morrison were on commentary. The New Day were then scheduled to defend the SmackDown Tag Team Championship against The Forgotten Sons, Miz and Morrison, and Lucha House Party in a fatal four-way tag team match at Money in the Bank.

== Event ==
Other on-screen personnel
Role:	Name:
English commentators	Michael Cole (SmackDown)
English commentators	Corey Graves (SmackDown)
English commentators	Tom Phillips (Raw)
English commentators	Samoa Joe (Raw)
English commentators	Byron Saxton (Raw)
Spanish commentator	Marcelo Rodríguez
Ring announcers	Greg Hamilton (SmackDown)
Ring announcers	Mike Rome (Raw)
Referees	Danilo Anfibio
Referees	Shawn Bennett
Referees	Jessika Carr
Referees	John Cone
Referees	Dan Engler
Referees	Darrick Moore
Referees	Chad Patton
Referees	Rod Zapata
Interviewers	Charly Caruso
Interviewers	Kayla Braxton
Interviewers	Alyse Ashton
Pre-show panel	Scott Stanford
Pre-show panel	Peter Rosenberg
Pre-show correspondents	Renee Young
Pre-show correspondents	Booker T
Pre-show correspondents	John "Bradshaw" Layfield

=== Pre-show ===
During the Money in the Bank Kickoff pre-show, Jeff Hardy faced Cesaro. In the end, Hardy performed a Swanton Bomb on Cesaro to win the match.

=== Preliminary matches ===
The actual pay-per-view opened with The New Day (Big E and Kofi Kingston) defending the SmackDown Tag Team Championship against The Miz and John Morrison, Lucha House Party (Lince Dorado and Gran Metalik), and The Forgotten Sons (Steve Cutler and Wesley Blake) (accompanied by Jaxson Ryker). During the match, Ryker was ejected from ringside for interference. In the climax, Big E performed the Big Ending on Metalik to retain the titles.

Next, R-Truth was scheduled to face MVP. Truth began to insult MVP, who was offended. Bobby Lashley then interrupted and decided that he would be the one to face Truth and MVP agreed. In the end, Lashley performed a Spear on Truth to win the match.

After that, Bayley (accompanied by Sasha Banks) defended the SmackDown Women's Championship against Tamina. During the first half of the match, Bayley began to target Tamina's leg. After Bayley taunted Tamina by splashing water on her, Tamina performed a clothesline on Bayley and threw her onto the announce table. After Tamina performed a Samoan Drop on Bayley, Banks distracted Tamina. This allowed Bayley to recover and attack Tamina. As Tamina attempted a Samoan Drop, Bayley countered into a roll-up to retain the title. Following the match, as Tamina attempted a Samoan Drop for a third time on Bayley, Banks attacked Tamina and saved Bayley once again.

In the next match, Braun Strowman defended SmackDown's Universal Championship against Bray Wyatt. During the match, Strowman dominated Wyatt. As Strowman attempted to tackle Wyatt outside the ring, Wyatt avoided Strowman, who collided with the announce table. Huskus The Pig Boy puppet then appeared behind the barricade to cheer on Wyatt while he was dominating Strowman. Wyatt performed a Sister Abigail on Strowman for a near-fall. As Wyatt attempted another Sister Abigail, Strowman countered into a Chokeslam. Strowman then performed a Running Powerslam on Wyatt outside the ring. In the closing moments, Strowman wore his old "Black Sheep" mask, with which Wyatt had taunted him on episodes of SmackDown and was an integral part of Strowman's gimmick during his time in The Wyatt Family. Strowman started to play mind games on Wyatt, who was laughing hysterically and elated that Strowman presumably decided to rejoin Wyatt and the two embraced. However, Strowman shoved Wyatt back, removed the mask and then performed a Running Powerslam on Wyatt to retain the title. Following the match, as Wyatt sat in the corner realizing he had been outsmarted, imagery of The Fiend appeared on screen.

In the penultimate match, Drew McIntyre defended Raw's WWE Championship against Seth Rollins. Rollins performed a Stomp on McIntyre for a nearfall. In the end, as Rollins attempted another Stomp, McIntyre countered with a Glasgow Kiss. Rebounding off the ropes, Rollins performed a superkick, but as McIntyre also rebounded off the ropes, he performed a Claymore Kick on Rollins to retain the title. Following the match, McIntyre offered a handshake to Rollins, who reluctantly obliged.

=== Main event ===
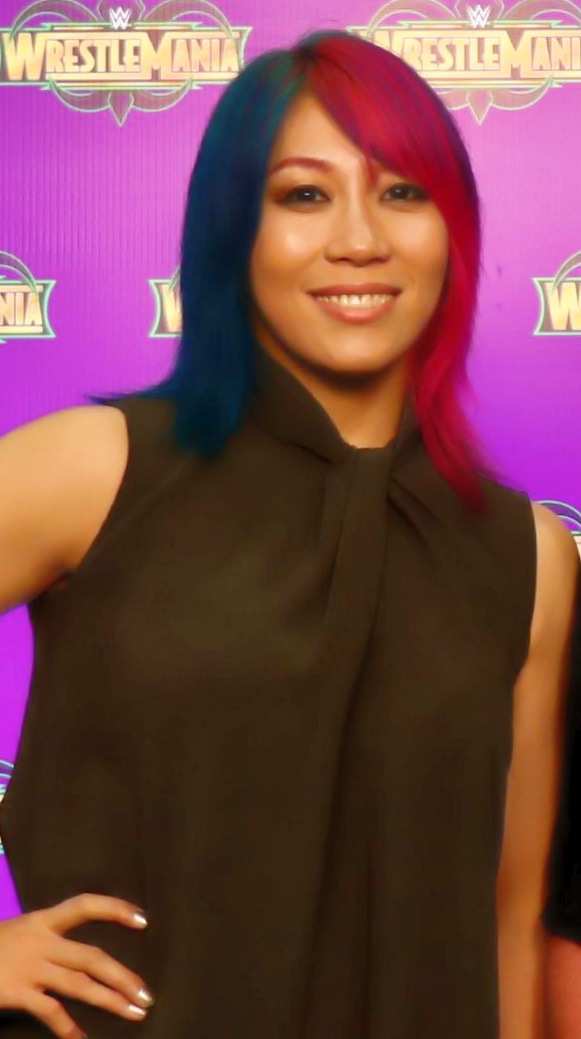
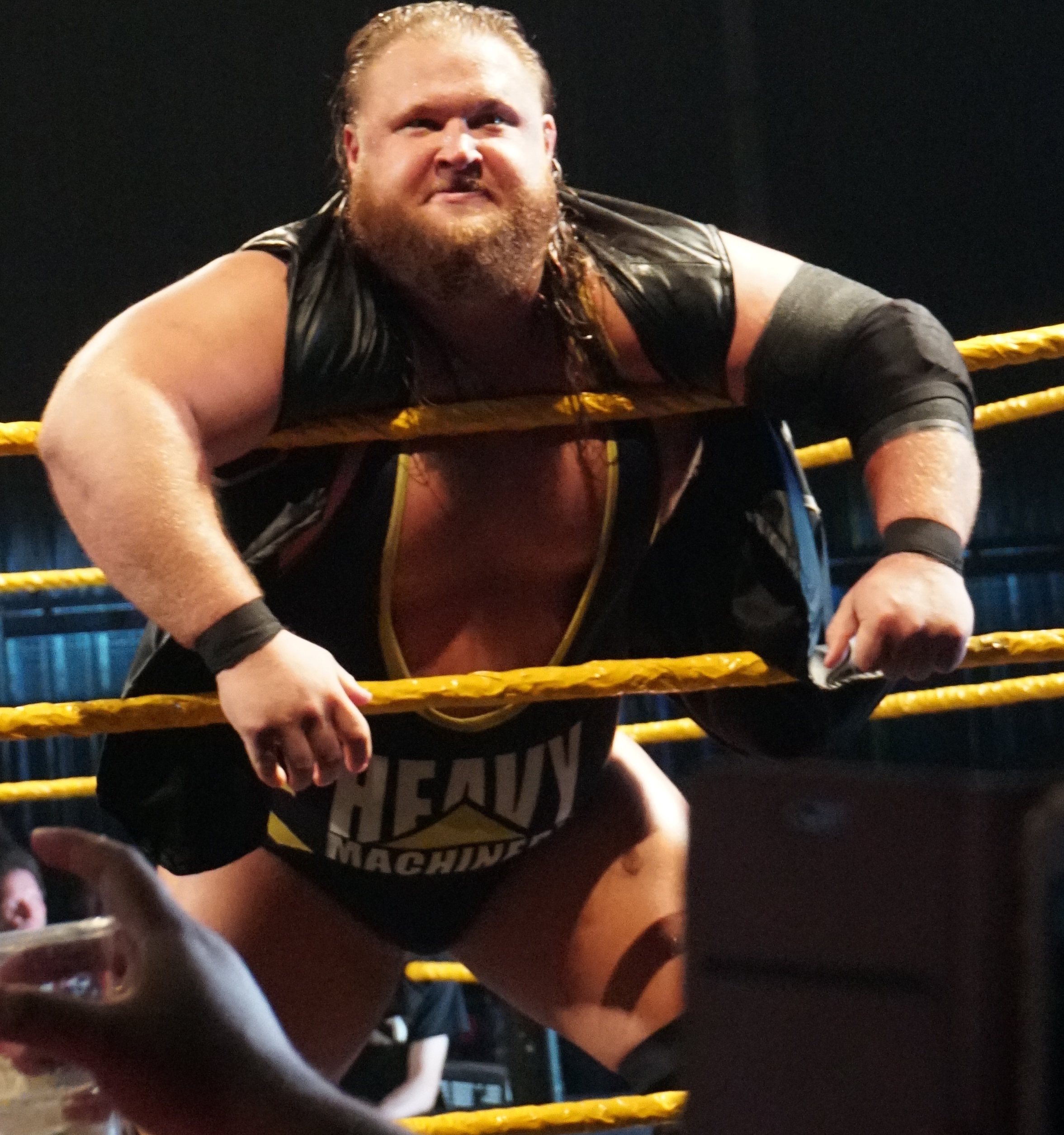
Asuka and Otis were the respective winners of the women's and men's Money in the Bank ladder matches.

In the main event, both the men's and women's Money in the Bank ladder matches were contested simultaneously at Titan Towers. The women's match featured Asuka, Shayna Baszler, and Nia Jax from Raw and Lacey Evans, Carmella, and Dana Brooke from SmackDown, while the men's match featured AJ Styles, Rey Mysterio, and Aleister Black from Raw and King Corbin, Daniel Bryan, and Otis from SmackDown. The women began in the lobby, where Asuka performed a splash off the mezzanine onto the other competitors before escaping in an elevator. The men, meanwhile, began in the gym, where Otis pinned Styles under a barbell. After leaving the gym, Mysterio ran past a restroom where he encountered Brother Love.

Bryan, Black, Otis, and Corbin brawled into an elevator, spilling out onto another floor where they briefly encountered Evans, Baszler, and Carmella. Bryan performed Yes Kicks on Corbin with encouragement from Otis, after which, Bryan attacked Otis. A Doink The Clown impersonator then briefly appeared from behind a chair. Baszler, Brooke, Jax, and Carmella then fought into the Money in the Bank Conference Room. After knocking Jax out with a steel chair, Brooke unhooked a prop Money in the Bank briefcase hanging from the ceiling and celebrated, thinking she had won, but Stephanie McMahon appeared and reminded Brooke that the actual briefcase was still on the roof. Carmella then unhooked a large poster off the wall (depicting herself winning the first women's Money in the Bank ladder match) and smashed it over Brooke's head. After Carmella exited the room, Evans performed the Women's Right on Carmella. Searching for Mysterio, Styles encountered a large poster of The Undertaker and then stumbled upon an Undertaker-themed room. This caused him to have flashbacks of his WrestleMania 36 loss to The Undertaker. Black then attacked Styles and closed the door, locking him in the room.

All of the participants except Styles and Asuka converged on a room where Paul Heyman was indulging in a buffet, and an inter-gender food fight ensued. During the melee, Baszler applied the Kirifuda Clutch on Mysterio, which was broken up when Jax and Otis charged and collided with Mysterio between them. Jax threw Carmella through the buffet table and teased a fight with Otis before the two went separate ways. Otis then encountered John Laurinaitis in the cafeteria and threw a pie in his face. Later, Styles and Bryan brawled into Vince McMahon's office, after which, Mr. McMahon ordered them to leave. Before leaving, however, Styles and Bryan positioned the chairs in their proper place, while Mr. McMahon sanitized his hands.

Asuka was the first to reach the roof, followed by Jax and Evans. The three fought in and around the rooftop ring until Asuka gained the upper hand by dropping a ladder on Jax. Asuka then briefly fought with Evans on the ladder before throwing her on top of Jax. As Asuka ascended the ladder again, Corbin appeared on the roof and climbed the other side of the ladder; however, Asuka threw him off. Asuka then grabbed the women's briefcase to win the women's match. Otis was the next to reach the roof, followed by Black, Mysterio, Styles, and Bryan. Corbin dispatched Mysterio and Black by throwing them off the roof (on Raw the next night, Mysterio revealed that they were just thrown down to a lower area of the roof). Styles performed the Phenomenal Forearm on Otis, and Styles and Corbin climbed the ladder. After a scuffle atop the ladder, Styles and Corbin unhooked the men's briefcase with both holding it. Elias, who Corbin had been feuding with since before WrestleMania, then appeared and attacked Corbin with a guitar, causing both Styles and Corbin to fumble the briefcase into the hands of Otis, who was declared the winner of the men's match.

== Aftermath ==
This would be the final Money in the Bank to livestream on the American version of the WWE Network, which merged under Peacock in April 2021.

=== Raw ===
The following night on Raw, Raw Women's Champion Becky Lynch came out with the women's Money in the Bank briefcase and announced that she would be going on hiatus. A confused Asuka then came out. Lynch stated that by Asuka winning the women's Money in the Bank ladder match, she had actually won the Raw Women's Championship and opened the briefcase, revealing the title belt inside. Lynch then revealed that she was going on hiatus because she was pregnant. With this, Asuka became WWE's second Women's Grand Slam Champion and third Women's Triple Crown Champion. The following week, The Kabuki Warriors (Asuka and Kairi Sane) hosted a championship celebration, but were interrupted by Nia Jax, who wanted a shot at the title. On the May 25 episode, Jax won a triple threat match to earn a title match against Asuka at Backlash.

=== SmackDown ===
On the following SmackDown, men's Money in the Bank winner Otis was a guest on MizTV where The Miz and John Morrison made fun of Otis and his relationship with Mandy Rose, and then challenged Otis to a tag team match. Due to the unavailability of Otis' Heavy Machinery tag team partner, Tucker, Otis had to find a different partner. Otis' mystery partner was revealed as Universal Champion Braun Strowman and the two defeated Miz and Morrison in the ensuing tag team match. Afterwards, Rose came out to congratulate Otis and then distracted Strowman for Otis to attempt to cash-in his contract. However, despite the temptation, Otis opted not to and saying he was joking. After entering into a feud with The Miz and John Morrison over the Money in the Bank contract in September, Otis was forced to defend the contract in a match against Miz, who had been drafted to Raw, at October's Hell in a Cell event, where Miz defeated Otis to win the Money in the Bank contract. Miz then successfully cashed in his contract on Raw's WWE Champion Drew McIntyre at Elimination Chamber on February 21, 2021, thus winning his second WWE Championship, last winning it in November 2010, which was also via a Money in the Bank cash-in.

Bray Wyatt made his return on the June 19 episode of SmackDown in a Firefly Fun House segment and stated that his rivalry with Braun Strowman was just getting started before appearing as his old cult leader persona of The Wyatt Family. Wyatt stated that since he created Strowman, it was his job to destroy him. The following week, Strowman responded by challenging Wyatt to a non-title match at a swamp called the Wyatt Swamp Fight which was scheduled for The Horror Show at Extreme Rules.

Also on the following SmackDown, Elias defeated King Corbin in a rematch from WrestleMania 36 to advance in the tournament for the vacant Intercontinental Championship.

== Results ==
No.	Results	Stipulations	Times
1^{P}	Jeff Hardy defeated Cesaro by pinfall	Singles match	13:30
2	The New Day (Big E and Kofi Kingston) (c) defeated The Forgotten Sons (Steve Cutler and Wesley Blake) (with Jaxson Ryker), John Morrison and The Miz, and Lucha House Party (Gran Metalik and Lince Dorado) by pinfall	Fatal four-way tag team match for the WWE SmackDown Tag Team Championship	12:00
3	Bobby Lashley defeated R-Truth by pinfall	Singles match	1:40
4	Bayley (c) (with Sasha Banks) defeated Tamina by pinfall	Singles match for the WWE SmackDown Women's Championship	10:30
5	Braun Strowman (c) defeated Bray Wyatt by pinfall	Singles match for the WWE Universal Championship	10:55
6	Drew McIntyre (c) defeated Seth Rollins by pinfall	Singles match for the WWE Championship	19:22
7	Asuka defeated Carmella, Dana Brooke, Lacey Evans, Nia Jax, and Shayna Baszler by retrieving the briefcase	Money in the Bank ladder match for the WWE Raw Women's Championship (Note: The men's and women's Money in the Bank ladder matches were contested at the same time. In addition to the normal Money in the Bank stipulation, the participants had to start on the ground floor of WWE's global headquarters at the time, Titan Towers, and ascend to the building's roof where the ring, ladders, and briefcases were located.) (Note: The match was originally announced as being for a women's championship match contract as per its usual stipulation, but on the following night's Raw, it was revealed that the match was actually for the Raw Women's Championship (which was placed inside of the Money in the Bank briefcase) due to previous champion Becky Lynch going on maternity leave.)	22:00
8	Otis defeated AJ Styles, Aleister Black, Daniel Bryan, King Corbin, and Rey Mysterio by retrieving the briefcase	Money in the Bank ladder match for a world championship match contract	27:15
(c) / – the champion(s) heading into the match; P / – the match was broadcast on the pre-show
