= 2019 WWE Superstar Shake-up =

WWE's intra-brand draft

- The 2019 WWE Superstar Shake-up logo.

General information
- Sport: Professional wrestling
- Date(s): April 15–May 8, 2019

Overview
- League: WWE
- Teams: Raw; SmackDown; 205 Live; NXT (outgoing only)

The 2019 WWE Superstar Shake-up was the thirteenth WWE draft – and the last to be branded as the Superstar Shake-up – produced by the American professional wrestling promotion WWE between the Raw, SmackDown, and 205 Live brands. Instead of a traditional draft, changes between the brands were made behind the scenes, with moving wrestlers simply appearing on a brand's show or announced via WWE's website or social medias. The event began on the April 15 and 16 episodes of Monday Night Raw and SmackDown Live, respectively, on the USA Network. The April 15 and 16 episodes were initially the only episodes advertised for the Superstar Shake-up, but more draft moves were confirmed throughout the remainder of the month and into early May.

Following the Superstar Shake-up, a Wild Card Rule was introduced, allowing up to four wrestlers to appear on the opposing brand's show for one night only with unsanctioned appearances penalized. This rule, however, was immediately broken, and the stipulations were never enforced, making brand division unclear. The rule was criticized by journalists and current wrestlers alike. With SmackDown's move to FOX on October 4, 2019, another draft was scheduled, as well as the announcement that the Wild Card Rule would end with this subsequent draft.

== Background ==
The WWE Draft, known as the Superstar Shake-up since 2017, is an annual process used by the American professional wrestling promotion WWE while a brand extension, or brand split, is in effect. The original brand extension occurred from 2002 to 2011, while the second and current brand split began in 2016. During a brand extension, the company divides its roster into brands where the wrestlers exclusively perform for each brand's respective television show, and the draft is used to refresh the rosters of the brand divisions, typically between the Raw and SmackDown brands.

For the 2017 and 2018 Superstar Shake-ups, instead of a traditional draft, the commissioners and general managers of WWE's Raw and SmackDown brands made trades and deals behind the scenes between their respective talent, including the promotion and drafting of wrestlers from the NXT brand. However, following TLC: Tables, Ladders & Chairs in December 2018, The McMahon Family (Vince McMahon, Stephanie McMahon, Shane McMahon, and Triple H) took over the running of Raw and SmackDown with no general managers, leaving them in charge of drafting decisions. On the April 8, 2019, episode of Monday Night Raw, the 2019 Superstar Shake-up was confirmed for the April 15 and 16 episodes of Raw and SmackDown, respectively. For the first time, superstars from the 205 Live brand were eligible to be drafted. Although initially only advertised for the aforementioned episodes, more draft moves were confirmed throughout the remainder of April and into early May.

== Selections ==
#	Employee (Real name)	Role	Brand (from)	Notes
Raw
The following wrestlers were drafted to the Raw brand on the April 15 episode of Raw.
1	The Miz	Male wrestler	SmackDown	
2	Ricochet	Male wrestler	NXT	Made his main roster debut on February 18, 2019, and appeared on Raw, SmackDown, and NXT until the Superstar Shake-up.
3	Aleister Black	Male wrestler	NXT	Made his main roster debut on February 18, 2019, and appeared on Raw, SmackDown, and NXT until the Superstar Shake-up.
4	The Viking Experience (Ivar and Erik)	Male tag team	NXT	Drafted while NXT Tag Team Champions. Formerly known as War Raiders in NXT, the team was renamed to The Viking Experience upon being drafted, while their individual ring names, Hanson and Rowe, were changed to Ivar and Erik, respectively. The team was renamed The Viking Raiders on the April 22 episode of Raw. They relinquished the NXT Tag Team Championship on the May 1 taping of NXT (aired May 15).
5	Cedric Alexander	Male wrestler	205 Live	
6	Andrade	Male wrestler	SmackDown	
7	Zelina Vega	Female wrestler	SmackDown	
8	Rey Mysterio	Male wrestler	SmackDown	
9	Lars Sullivan (Dylan Miley)	Male wrestler	NXT	Advertised since November 18, 2018, and appeared on Raw and SmackDown a week prior to the Superstar Shake-up.
10	The Usos (Jey Uso and Jimmy Uso)	Male tag team	SmackDown	
11	Naomi (Trinity Fatu)	Female wrestler	SmackDown	
12	EC3	Male wrestler	NXT	Advertised since December 17, 2018, and appeared on Raw and SmackDown for several weeks prior to the Superstar Shake-up.
13	Eric Young	Male wrestler	SmackDown	Separated from his team Sanity, which subsequently disbanded.
14	Lacey Evans	Female wrestler	NXT	Advertised since December 17, 2018 and appeared on Raw and SmackDown for several weeks prior to the Superstar Shake-up.
15	AJ Styles	Male wrestler	SmackDown	
The following wrestlers were drafted to the Raw brand on the April 22 episode of Raw.
16	Samoa Joe	Male wrestler	SmackDown	Drafted with the United States Championship.
17	Cesaro	Male wrestler	SmackDown	Drafted separately from his tag team partner, Sheamus, who had to take time off due to an injury.
The following wrestlers were drafted to the Raw brand on the April 29 episode of Raw.
18	Luke Gallows and Karl Anderson	Male tag team	SmackDown	
The following wrestler was confirmed to be drafted to the Raw brand on the May 8 taping of Main Event (aired May 11).
19	Nikki Cross	Female wrestler	NXT	Advertised since December 17, 2018, and appeared on Raw and SmackDown for several weeks prior to the Superstar Shake-up.
SmackDown
The following wrestlers were drafted to the SmackDown brand on the April 16 episode of SmackDown.
1	Finn Bálor	Male wrestler	Raw	Drafted with the Intercontinental Championship.
2	Ember Moon	Female wrestler	Raw	
3	Bayley	Female wrestler	Raw	Separated from her tag team partner, Sasha Banks.
4	Kairi Sane	Female wrestler	NXT	Separated from her tag team partner, Io Shirai.
5	Lars Sullivan	Male wrestler	Raw	Was originally drafted to Raw, but transferred to SmackDown.
6	Buddy Murphy	Male wrestler	205 Live	
7	Elias	Male wrestler	Raw	
8	Roman Reigns	Male wrestler	Raw	
9	Liv Morgan	Female wrestler	Raw	Announced on WWE.com. Separated from her team, The Riott Squad.
10	Chad Gable	Male wrestler	Raw	Announced on WWE.com. Separated from his tag team partner, Bobby Roode.
11	Apollo Crews	Male wrestler	Raw	Announced on WWE.com
12	Mickie James	Female wrestler	Raw	Announced on WWE.com
13	Heavy Machinery (Otis and Tucker)	Male tag team	NXT	Announced on WWE.com. Advertised since December 17, 2018, and appeared on Raw and SmackDown for several weeks prior to the Superstar Shake-up.
The following wrestlers were drafted to the SmackDown brand on the April 23 episode of SmackDown.
14	Andrade	Male wrestler	Raw	Originally drafted to Raw, but moved back to SmackDown.
15	Zelina Vega	Female wrestler	Raw	Originally drafted to Raw, but moved back to SmackDown.
16	Aleister Black	Male wrestler	Raw	Originally drafted to Raw, but moved to SmackDown, separating him from his tag team partner, Ricochet.
17	Jinder Mahal	Male wrestler	Raw	
18	The Singh Brothers (Sunil Singh and Samir Singh) (Gurv Sihra and Harv Sihra)	Male tag team	Raw	
The following wrestlers were drafted to the SmackDown brand prior to the April 30 episode of SmackDown.
19	The B-Team (Bo Dallas and Curtis Axel)	Male tag team	Raw	
205 Live
The following wrestlers were drafted to the 205 Live brand on the April 30 episode of 205 Live.
1	The Singh Brothers (Sunil Singh and Samir Singh)	Male tag team	SmackDown	Originally drafted to SmackDown, but moved to 205 Live, separating them from their stablemate, Jinder Mahal.

Notes

- Seven tag teams/stables were split or broken up as a result of the Superstar Shake-up. Sanity disbanded after Eric Young moved to Raw, The Boss 'n' Hug Connection was split up as Bayley moved to SmackDown while Sasha Banks remained on Raw, Liv Morgan was split from The Riott Squad as she moved to SmackDown while her teammates Ruby Riott and Sarah Logan remained on Raw, the team of Chad Gable and Bobby Roode was split up as Gable moved to SmackDown while Roode remained on Raw, the team of Aleister Black and Ricochet was split up as Black moved to SmackDown while Ricochet remained on Raw, The Bar disbanded as Cesaro was drafted to Raw while Sheamus took time off due to injury, and the stable of Jinder Mahal and The Singh Brothers (Sunil Singh and Samir Singh) was split up as Mahal moved to SmackDown while The Singh Brothers went to 205 Live.
- The Intercontinental Championship moved to SmackDown, while the United States Championship moved to Raw. Reigning NXT Tag Team Champions The Viking Raiders were drafted to Raw, but the championship did not move with them; they subsequently relinquished the title on the May 1 taping of NXT (aired May 15).
- At WrestleMania 35, SmackDown wrestler Becky Lynch won both the Raw and SmackDown Women's Championships, allowing her to appear on both brands. She was not assigned a home brand during the Superstar Shake-up, but after she lost the SmackDown Women's Championship at Money in the Bank, she became a member of the Raw brand.

== Aftermath ==
On Raw, new draftee Lacey Evans defeated Natalya to earn a Raw Women's Championship match against Becky Lynch at Money in the Bank. Natalya was subsequently entered into the women's Money in the Bank ladder match, along with Dana Brooke, Alexa Bliss, and new draftee Naomi; for medical reasons, Bliss was subsequently replaced by new draftee Nikki Cross. New draftee AJ Styles earned a Universal Championship match against Seth Rollins at the event, while new draftees Samoa Joe and Rey Mysterio continued their feud from SmackDown, leading to a United States Championship match at Money in the Bank that Mysterio won. Bobby Roode, now a singles competitor, turned heel and changed his ring name to Robert Roode and became the second holder of WWE's 24/7 Championship that was introduced in May. New draftee The Miz continued his feud from SmackDown with authority figure Shane McMahon, leading to a Steel Cage match at Money in the Bank that Shane won. New draftee Ricochet was entered into the men's Money in the Bank ladder match, along with Braun Strowman, Drew McIntyre, and Baron Corbin, though Strowman was replaced by Sami Zayn. New draftees The Usos (Jey Uso and Jimmy Uso) began a feud with The Revival (Scott Dawson and Dash Wilder). After Eric Young's transfer to Raw, Alexander Wolfe moved to the NXT UK brand and Killian Dain moved to the NXT brand. In May 2019, Raw wrestler Tyler Breeze began appearing on NXT and unsuccessfully challenged Velveteen Dream for the NXT North American Championship at NXT TakeOver: XXV on June 1. Following that match, Breeze confirmed that he was back on NXT.

On SmackDown, Elias was introduced as the "biggest acquisition in SmackDown history" by Vince McMahon and began a feud with fellow new draftee Roman Reigns, leading to a match at Money in the Bank that Reigns won. After Andrade moved back to SmackDown, he continued a feud with new SmackDown draftee and Intercontinental Champion Finn Bálor that began the previous week; both were entered into the men's Money in the Bank ladder match along with Ali and Randy Orton. Bálor was then scheduled to defend his title against Andrade at Super ShowDown. New draftee Lars Sullivan began a feud with R-Truth. New draftee Bayley was given an opportunity to challenge Becky Lynch for the SmackDown Women's Championship at Money in the Bank, but lost it to Charlotte Flair. Bayley was subsequently entered into the women's Money in the Bank ladder match along with Mandy Rose, Carmella, and new draftee Ember Moon; Bayley won the match and later that same night, cashed in the contract to win the SmackDown Women's Championship from Flair, who had just defeated Lynch for the title. Paige introduced a new tag team, The Kabuki Warriors, consisting of Asuka and new draftee Kairi Sane, to manage and go after the WWE Women's Tag Team Championship. Raw wrestler Dolph Ziggler had been inactive since January's Royal Rumble event, but returned prior to June's Super ShowDown event to challenge Kofi Kingston for SmackDown's WWE Championship. On-screen graphics when he appeared on SmackDown showed that he was still part of Raw, but following Super ShowDown, his WWE.com profile was updated to show that he was moved to SmackDown.

The reasons for Andrade and Zelina Vega's move back to SmackDown, and Aleister Black's switch to the brand, were later revealed. In WWE's attempt to keep real-life couples on the same brand, Andrade was moved back to SmackDown because of his relationship with Charlotte Flair, Vega was moved as she is Andrade's on-screen manager, and Black was moved because of his marriage to Vega. It was also reported that FOX, where SmackDown would begin airing in October 2019, wanted more Latin American stars on the show and requested Andrade and Vega to be moved back to the brand.

=== Wild Card Rule ===
On the May 6 episode of Raw, Vince McMahon introduced a Wild Card Rule, with specific stipulations:

1. Up to four wrestlers would be allowed to appear on the opposing brand's show by invitation for one night only.
2. Unsanctioned appearances would be penalized with a fine or termination.

Following the implementation of the Wild Card Rule, the stipulations were routinely ignored with numerous stars freely appearing on both shows for multiple weeks with storylines crossing over both brands, blurring the lines between Raw and SmackDown. The rule was heavily criticized by journalists and current wrestlers alike. Writing for Newsweek, Phillip Martinez said that even though WWE tried explaining the rule, it was still confusing and unclear. Raw wrestler Seth Rollins said that the rule "really muddled things up" as it "used to feel special" to only see other talent every so often, but because of the rule, they were seeing each other every week. SmackDown wrestler Kevin Owens also criticized the rule. He said that he understood that it was intended to bring unpredictability to the shows, but it was "loosely defined". Andrew Murray of WhatCulture said it was one of WWE's "most divisive creative decisions in years" and the promotion were unable to stick to their original outline. Connor Casey of ComicBook.com said that the rule "effectively killed the brand split".

=== Subsequent draft ===
With SmackDown's move to FOX in October and Raw remaining on the USA Network, WWE decided to hold a second draft for the year to definitively split the brands. Returning to its original name (the "WWE Draft") and a traditional draft format, this second draft of 2019 occurred on the October 11 and 14 episodes of SmackDown (renamed to Friday Night SmackDown) and Raw, respectively. Personalities from FOX and NBCUniversal (USA's parent company) appeared and had influence over the picks (the first time television networks had an influence over WWE's drafting decisions). The Wild Card Rule also ended with this subsequent draft.
