= Fastlane (2015) =

WWE pay-per-view and livestreaming event

- Promotional poster featuring Roman Reigns
- Promotion: WWE
- Date: February 22, 2015
- City: Memphis, Tennessee
- Venue: FedExForum
- Attendance: 13,263
- Buy rate: 46,000 (excluding WWE Network views)
- Tagline: Get in the Fastlane on the Road to WrestleMania!

WWE event chronology
| ← Previous; NXT TakeOver: Rival | Next → WrestleMania 31 |

Fastlane chronology
| ← Previous; First | Next → 2016 |

The 2015 Fastlane was a professional wrestling pay-per-view (PPV) and livestreaming event produced by WWE. It was the inaugural Fastlane and took place on February 22, 2015, at the FedExForum in Memphis, Tennessee. Fastlane replaced Elimination Chamber in the February slot of WWE's calendar with Elimination Chamber pushed back to May for 2015. The event's name was a reference to its position on the "Road to WrestleMania".

Seven matches were contested on the main card. In the main event, Roman Reigns defeated Daniel Bryan to retain his WWE World Heavyweight Championship match against Brock Lesnar at WrestleMania 31. In the penultimate match, Rusev defeated John Cena via technical submission to retain the WWE United States Championship. In another prominent match, Bad News Barrett retained the WWE Intercontinental Championship against Dean Ambrose. Also at the event, Triple H had a "face-to-face" confrontation with Sting, which set up a match at WrestleMania 31.

The event received 46,000 pay-per-view buys (excluding WWE Network views), down from the Elimination Chamber 2014 figure of 183,000 buys, which predated the launch of the WWE Network. This was WWE's first original PPV and livestreaming event introduced after the launch of the WWE Network in February 2014.

== Production ==
=== Background ===
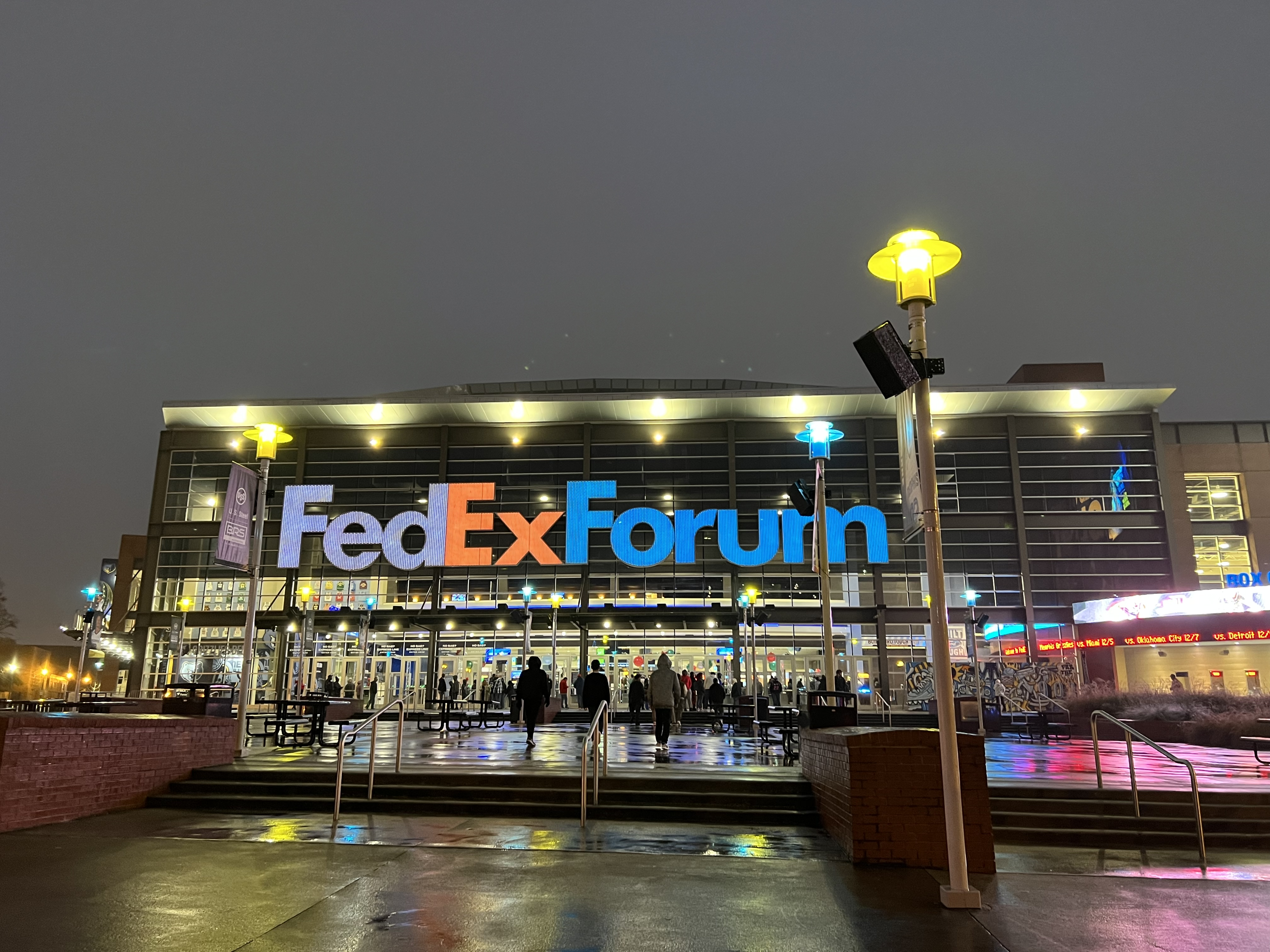
The inaugural Fastlane was held at the FedExForum in Memphis, Tennessee.

On December 8, 2014, WWE scheduled a professional wrestling pay-per-view (PPV) and livestreaming event titled Fastlane to be held on February 22 that year at the FedExForum in Memphis, Tennessee. It replaced Elimination Chamber, which was previously held in February but was pushed back to May that year. The name "Fastlane" was chosen as a reference to its position on the "Road to WrestleMania", being held in the two-month period between the Royal Rumble and WWE's flagship event. Tickets went on sale December 13, 2014.

=== Storylines ===
The event comprised seven matches that resulted from scripted storylines. Results were predetermined by WWE's writers, while storylines were produced on WWE's weekly television shows, Raw and SmackDown.

On November 23, during the main event of Survivor Series, Sting made his first appearance in a WWE ring by attacking Triple H with a Scorpion Death Drop and dragging Dolph Ziggler on top of Seth Rollins, giving Team Cena the win and causing the Authority to be removed from power. On the January 19 episode of Raw, Sting appeared backstage during the main event, a 3-on-1 handicap match between John Cena and the team of Big Show, Kane, and Rollins. The lights in the arena darkened as Sting walked to the stage and gestured to the Authority at ringside. The distraction allowed John Cena to pin Rollins for the win, which reinstated the recently (kayfabe) fired wrestlers Ziggler, Ryback, and Erick Rowan. On January 26, Triple H challenged Sting to a "face-to-face" confrontation at Fastlane. When Triple H reiterated his challenge on the February 9 episode of Raw, the lights went out, and a group of Sting impersonators appeared around the arena and inside the ring, illuminated by spotlights, while the real Sting accepted the challenge in a video message.

After failing to win the WWE World Heavyweight Championship at the Royal Rumble, John Cena was being interviewed after the event. When asked what was next for him, Rusev, who was the last man eliminated from the Royal Rumble match, interrupted the interview. The two shoved each other and got into each other's faces. On January 26, Rusev was scheduled to defend his United States Championship against Cena at the event.

On the January 29 episode of SmackDown, Nikki Bella was scheduled to defend the Divas Championship against Paige at the event.

On the February 2 episode of Raw, Roman Reigns was manipulated by The Authority into agreeing to defend his title opportunity for the WWE World Heavyweight Championship at WrestleMania 31, which he had earned by winning the Royal Rumble match, in a match at Fastlane. Later that night, Daniel Bryan defeated Seth Rollins to earn the right to face Reigns at the event.

On the January 19 episode of Raw, Dean Ambrose defeated Bad News Barrett. The following weeks, Ambrose demanded a match for the Intercontinental Championship, but Barrett declined. On the February 16 episode of Raw, after Barrett defeated Damien Mizdow, Ambrose attacked Barrett by tying his hands around the ring post, forced him to sign the contract and had Barrett defend his title against him at the event.

On the January 29 episode of SmackDown, Tyson Kidd defeated Jey Uso. On the February 2 episode of Raw, Cesaro defeated Jimmy Uso. On the February 9 episode of Raw, Cesaro and Kidd defeated The Usos. On the February 16 episode of Raw, The Usos were scheduled to defend their Tag Team Championship against Cesaro and Kidd.

Early in the year, Gold and Stardust started having problems communicating in their matches, with Stardust (Cody Rhodes) becoming further entrenched in his gimmick, causing friction between the brothers. An angry Stardust walked out on a match against The Ascension (Konnor and Viktor) on the February 2 episode of Raw. After a loss to The New Day (Kofi Kingston and Xavier Woods) on the February 16 episode of Raw, Stardust attacked Goldust. On the February 19 episode of SmackDown, Goldust was scheduled to face Stardust at the event.

On the February 9 episode of Raw, Dolph Ziggler, Ryback, and Erick Rowan came out and helped Daniel Bryan and Roman Reigns to defeat Seth Rollins, Big Show, Kane and J&J Security (Jamie Noble and Joey Mercury). On the February 16 episode of Raw, after Ziggler defeated Rollins via disqualification, he was attacked by Rollins and J&J Security, but Ryback, and Rowan came out and saved Ziggler. On the February 19 episode of SmackDown, after Rollins defeated Ziggler, the Authority attacked Ziggler, Ryback, and Rowan. Afterwards, it was announced that Ziggler, Ryback, and Rowan would face Rollins, Big Show, and Kane in a six man tag team match at the event.

The Fastlane Kickoff pre-show included a "Miz TV" segment with Paul Heyman as the guest.

== Event ==
Other on-screen personnel
| Role: | Name: |
|---|---|
| English commentators | Michael Cole |
| English commentators | Jerry Lawler |
| English commentators | John "Bradshaw" Layfield |
| Spanish commentators | Carlos Cabrera |
| Spanish commentators | Marcelo Rodriguez |
| Interviewers | Tom Phillips (Pre-show) |
| Interviewers | Eden Stiles (Pre-show) |
| Interviewers | The Miz (Miz TV) |
| Ring announcer | Lillian Garcia |
| Referees | Mike Chioda |
| Referees | John Cone |
| Referees | Charles Robinson |
| Referees | Dan Engler |
| Referees | Darrick Moore |
| Referees | Matt Bennett |
| Pre-show Panel | Renee Young |
| Pre-show Panel | Booker T |
| Pre-show Panel | Corey Graves |
| Pre-show Panel | Byron Saxton |

=== Pre-show ===
During the Fastlane Kickoff pre-show, The Miz hosted a Miz TV segment, during which he scolded his personal assistant Damien Mizdow, telling him to sit in the corner, continuing the hostility between the two. Miz interviewed Paul Heyman, who informed the crowd that Brock Lesnar would not be in attendance, but that Lesnar would defeat whoever won the night's main event at WrestleMania to retain his WWE World Heavyweight Championship. No matches were held during the pre-show.

=== Preliminary matches ===
The actual pay-per-view opened with Dolph Ziggler, Erick Rowan, and Ryback facing Seth Rollins, Big Show, and Kane (accompanied by Jamie Noble and Joey Mercury) in a six-man tag team match. In the end, Big Show executed a KO Punch on Ziggler whilst Rollins distracted the referee and Kane executed a Chokeslam on Ziggler to win the match. After the match, Rollins performed Curb Stomps on Ziggler and Rowan. While attempting a Curb Stomp on Ryback, Randy Orton returned and performed RKOs on Noble, Joey Mercury, and Kane while Rollins fled the arena.

Next, Goldust faced Stardust. Goldust pinned Stardust with a crucifix for the win. After the match, Stardust shook Goldust's hand, but then attacked him backstage and informed his father, Dusty Rhodes, that their feud was not over.

After that, The Usos (Jey Uso and Jimmy Uso) defended the WWE Tag Team Championship against Tyson Kidd and Cesaro (accompanied by Natalya). Kidd executed a Swinging Fisherman's Neckbreaker on Jimmy to win the titles.

Triple H cut a promo about his frustrations with Sting. Upon Sting's arrival, Triple H offered to do business with Sting, allowing Sting to be immortalized on the WWE Network and even be inducted into the WWE Hall of Fame. After failing to come to a resolution, Triple H attacked Sting and grabbed his signature sledgehammer, however Sting came prepared with his signature baseball bat. With Triple H trapped in the corner, Sting pointed to the WrestleMania sign, silently challenging Triple H to a match. Triple H tried to attack Sting from behind, but Sting attacked Triple H with his bat and performed a Scorpion Death drop to end the segment. It was revealed later in the show that a match between the two at WrestleMania 31 had been made official.

In the fourth match, Nikki Bella (accompanied by Brie Bella) defended the Divas Championship against Paige. Nikki rolled-up Paige whilst holding Paige's tights to retain the title.

Next, Bad News Barrett defended the Intercontinental Championship against Dean Ambrose. Ambrose was disqualified for attacking Barrett in the corner and not backing off by the count of five, meaning Barrett retained the title. After the match, Ambrose performed Dirty Deeds on Barrett and left the ring with the title belt.

In another segment, several hooded torchbearers stood on the entrance ramp while a casket was wheeled down to the ring, leading the audience to believe that The Undertaker was returning. Instead, Bray Wyatt was in the casket, revealing that his cryptic vignettes over the past few weeks were referring to The Undertaker, and challenged The Undertaker to a match at WrestleMania.

In the penultimate match, Rusev (accompanied by Lana) defended the United States Championship against John Cena. In a back-and-forth match, Rusev countered out of several Attitude Adjustment attempts but failed to pin Cena. Cena performed an Attitude Adjustment on Rusev for a near-fall. Rusev countered a Diving Leg Drop Bulldog into a Powerbomb and applied The Accolade but Cena escaped. While Lana distracted the referee, Rusev attacked Cena with a low blow, and applied The Accolade again. After Cena passed out, the referee stopped the match and awarded Rusev the victory by technical submission, meaning Rusev retained the title.

=== Main event ===
In the main event, Roman Reigns defended his WWE World Heavyweight Championship contendership at WrestleMania against Daniel Bryan. During the match, Bryan applied the Yes! Lock on Reigns, who was able to reach the ropes for a break. When Reigns subsequently rolled out of the ring, Bryan performed two suicide dives, but Reigns countered a third dive and turned it into a suplex outside the ring. Reigns performed a Superman Punch for a near-fall. Bryan performed a Running Knee for another near-fall. After a series of roundhouse YES! kicks, Bryan attempted a second Running Knee, but Reigns countered with a spear to win the match. Visibly upset, Bryan shook Reigns' hand but added that "you better kick his (Lesnar's) ass" as the show ended with the two leaving the ring.

== Reception ==
Fastlane received mixed reviews, with much of the criticism directed at most of the matches not having decisive finishes. Matthew Asher of Slam! Wrestling gave the event a rating of 3/5, writing that "questionable match endings and fan reaction may hurt [WrestleMania 31] [...] After the disastrous Royal Rumble finish and #CancelWWENetwork trending worldwide, it looked like the WWE was going for a mulligan at the brand new PPV WWE Fastlane. Sadly, I don't think that happened as a very harsh audience made it clear they weren't too happy with the results of this latest PPV." Asher criticized the endings of the following matches: Goldust-Stardust, Bella-Paige, Barrett-Ambrose and Rusev-Cena, while rating the tag title match 3/5 and the main event 4/5. Asher pointed out that at one point, Roman Reigns should have lost via count-out if not for a slow count and that the show ended with Reigns having "the unfortunate task of soaking up the mixed reaction of the crowd".

Kenny Herzog of Rolling Stone magazine headlined his article with "It's Roman Reigns, Deal With It", while remarking that "it seemed as if the Fastlane ticket holders came in protest, or at the very least begrudged". Regarding the main event, Herzog wrote that "Daniel Bryan essentially put Roman Reigns over", but "no one really, truly thought DB would get the 1-2-3 and headline a second straight WrestleMania (which perhaps explains the crowd's curbed enthusiasm), and we all realized Reigns would counter that second running knee with a decisive spear". Herzog reserved praise for Tyson Kidd's portrayal of his character, as well as Kidd and Cesaro's in-ring abilities, concluding that Kidd "has emerged as a key to the midcard revival".

Throughout the night, the crowd for Fastlane was noticeably quiet, which Benjamin Tucker of Pro Wrestling Torch acknowledged. Tucker, who attended the event, rated the event 6.0/10, and stated "an okay event that did not need to happen", with the "general feeling on the show, though, was WWE holding back". Tucker felt that the Memphis crowd was being wrongly blamed for the "Fastlane snoozer", writing that, "It's sad to see individuals lash out at others who spend their hard-earned money to see something they love because "they didn't do it right." This is all misguided hatred. Hate WWE's terrible booking. Hate sloppily designed matches. But don't hate the fans. [...] If we pay to go to these events, we react how we feel. If WWE cannot make us feel the "proper" way, then it's on them, not us. And unfortunately, tonight was definitely on them, with a middling show that felt like another three-hour Raw special than a true pay-per-view".

== Aftermath ==
On the February 23 episode of Raw, Randy Orton called out Seth Rollins to a match. When The Authority appeared instead of Rollins, Orton apparently rejoined them. On the March 9 episode of Raw, Orton would insult each member of The Authority, only to pass it off as a joke, but later in the night, Orton would refuse a tag by Rollins during a 2-on-1 handicap match against Roman Reigns, intentionally cost both of them the match. Afterwards, Orton brutally attacked Rollins, following it up with an RKO through the broadcast table. On the March 12 episode of SmackDown, Orton challenged Rollins to a match at WrestleMania 31, which Rollins accepted on the following Raw.

Dolph Ziggler, Ryback, and Erick Rowan avenged their loss on the February 26 episode of SmackDown, defeating Rollins, Kane, and Big Show.

Bray Wyatt called out The Undertaker after a series of mysterious messages that were played out on February episodes of Raw and SmackDown, saying he was no longer afraid of the Undertaker and proclaiming that he was "the new face of fear". On the March 9 episode of Raw, Undertaker accepted Wyatt's challenge to face each other at WrestleMania 31 by setting Wyatt's trademark rocking chair on fire with a bolt of lightning.

Paige received a rematch against Nikki Bella for the Divas Championship on the March 2 episode of Raw, which she won via DQ after Brie Bella interfered. The Bellas attacked Paige post-match, only for AJ Lee to return and fight The Bella Twins off. On that week's SmackDown, Lee defeated Brie after Paige prevented Nikki from interfering. On March 9, a tag team match pitting The Bella Twins against Lee and Paige was scheduled for WrestleMania 31.

The Usos received a championship rematch against WWE Tag Team Champions Tyson Kidd and Cesaro on the following Raw. Natalya turned heel during the match when she interfered and caused a disqualification that kept the titles from changing hands.

Also, John Cena challenged Rusev to a rematch for the United States Championship, which Rusev declined. On the March 2 episode of Raw, Stephanie McMahon stated that Cena would not be competing at WrestleMania unless Rusev agreed to a match. The following week, after Rusev won his match, Rusev made several insulting remarks toward the US, which drew the ire of Cena, who applied the STF on Rusev until Rusev passed out. Cena used a bottle of water to revive Rusev and placed him in the hold again, and refused to release it until Lana granted Cena a title rematch against Rusev at WrestleMania 31.

Fastlane returned in February 2016, thus establishing Fastlane as an annual pay-per-view for the promotion. It was held annually until 2020 when Fastlane was removed from the schedule to allow WWE to hold their Super ShowDown PPV that year, but Fastlane was reinstated in 2021. The 2021 Fastlane would in turn be the final Fastlane held until the event was reinstated in 2023.

== Results ==
| No. | Results | Stipulations | Times |
|---|---|---|---|
| 1 | The Authority (Big Show, Kane, and Seth Rollins) (with J&J Security (Jamie Noble and Joey Mercury) defeated Dolph Ziggler, Erick Rowan, and Ryback by pinfall | Six-man tag team match | 13:01 |
| 2 | Goldust (with Dusty Rhodes) defeated Stardust by pinfall | Singles match | 8:55 |
| 3 | Brass Ring Club (Tyson Kidd and Cesaro) (with Natalya) defeated The Usos (Jey Uso and Jimmy Uso) (c) by pinfall | Tag team match for the WWE Tag Team Championship | 09:33 |
| 4 | Nikki Bella (c) (with Brie Bella) defeated Paige by pinfall | Singles match for the WWE Divas Championship | 05:34 |
| 5 | Bad News Barrett (c) defeated Dean Ambrose by disqualification | Singles match for the WWE Intercontinental Championship | 7:58 |
| 6 | Rusev (c) (with Lana) defeated John Cena by technical submission | Singles match for the WWE United States Championship | 18:44 |
| 7 | Roman Reigns defeated Daniel Bryan by pinfall | Singles match to determine the number one contender for the WWE World Heavyweight Championship at WrestleMania 31 | 20:10 |
(c) / – the champion(s) heading into the match
