= WWE Fastlane =

WWE pay-per-view and livestreaming event series

- WWE Fastlane logo used since 2019
- Promotions: WWE
- Brands: Raw (2017, 2019, 2021, 2023); SmackDown (2018–2019, 2021, 2023)
- First event: 2015
- Last event: 2023

WWE Fastlane was a professional wrestling event produced by WWE, a professional wrestling promotion based in Connecticut. It is broadcast live and has been available through pay-per-view (PPV) and via livestreaming on the WWE Network since 2015 and Peacock since 2021. The event was established in 2015 and replaced Elimination Chamber in the February slot of WWE's pay-per-view calendar; Elimination Chamber was pushed back to May that year. Beginning in 2017, the event moved to March, which made it WWE's first non-WrestleMania PPV to be held in March. In 2023, the event took place in October.

With the reintroduction of the brand extension in mid-2016, Fastlane was Raw-exclusive in 2017 and SmackDown-exclusive in 2018 before brand-exclusive PPVs were discontinued following WrestleMania 34 that year. The event was produced annually until 2020 when Fastlane was removed from the schedule to allow WWE to hold that year's Super ShowDown PPV; however, Fastlane was reinstated in 2021, but it was again discontinued. The 2021 event was also WWE's first PPV available to livestream on Peacock in the United States before the American version of the WWE Network merged under Peacock and shut down on April 4, which also made it the final PPV available to stream on the American WWE Network before its closure. After a two-year hiatus, Fastlane was again reinstated for 2023.

The name of the event was originally a reference to its position on the "Road to WrestleMania", as the event was held in the two-month period between the Royal Rumble and WWE's flagship event. With the event's revival in 2023, however, this theme was dropped due to Fastlane taking place six months after WrestleMania 39.

== History ==
The American professional wrestling promotion WWE first held Fastlane on February 22, 2015, in Memphis, Tennessee, and it was broadcast live on pay-per-view (PPV) and was livestreamed on the WWE Network. For the 2015 calendar year, it replaced Elimination Chamber, which had been held in February from 2010 to 2014; the 2015 Elimination Chamber was in turn held in May. The name "Fastlane" was chosen as a reference to its position on the "Road to WrestleMania", being held in the two-month period between the Royal Rumble and WWE's flagship event.

The event returned in 2016, also in February, thus establishing Fastlane as an annual PPV for the promotion. In 2017, Fastlane was pushed back to March, with Elimination Chamber returning to its original February slot, which made Fastlane the first non-WrestleMania PPV to be held in March. The 2017 event was also held as a Raw-exclusive show, following the reintroduction of the WWE brand extension in mid-2016 where the promotion again split its roster into brands where wrestlers were exclusively assigned to perform. The 2018 event was then made a SmackDown-exclusive PPV, but this would be the final SmackDown-exclusive PPV, as well as WWE's final brand-exclusive PPV, as following WrestleMania 34 that year, brand-exclusive PPVs were discontinued. In 2020, Fastlane was removed from the schedule to allow WWE to hold that year's Super ShowDown PPV; however, Fastlane was reinstated in 2021. Due to the COVID-19 pandemic, the 2021 event was held in WWE's bio-secure bubble called the WWE ThunderDome, hosted at Tropicana Field in St. Petersburg, Florida.

The 2021 event was WWE's first PPV event to livestream on Peacock's WWE Network channel in the United States, following the merger of the American WWE Network under Peacock on March 18 that year. Fastlane was held during the transitional period (March 18 – April 4) and was simulcast on Peacock and the American WWE Network, which in turn made it the final PPV to air on the American WWE Network as following this transitional period, the American WWE Network shut down on April 4; this did not affect other countries, which maintained the separate WWE Network service (although a few other countries have since branched off onto other livestreaming platforms).

In October 2021, WWE revealed their PPV calendar for 2022 and Fastlane was not included. While there had been a to be announced event for February, on January 17, 2022, this event was revealed as Elimination Chamber. Fastlane was in turn discontinued without a formal announcement. However, on June 20, 2023, after a two-year hiatus, WWE announced that Fastlane had been reinstated for October 7 of that year, dropping its "Road to WrestleMania" theme due to it taking place six months after WrestleMania 39. As WWE resumed live touring in July 2021, the 2023 Fastlane was scheduled for the Gainbridge Fieldhouse in Indianapolis, Indiana, replacing the Extreme Rules in the October slot. Fastlane was not scheduled for 2024 and was replaced by the revived Bad Blood event.

== Events ==
Raw-branded event	SmackDown-branded event

#	Event	Date	City	Venue	Main event	Ref.
1	Fastlane (2015)	February 22, 2015	Memphis, Tennessee	FedExForum	Daniel Bryan vs. Roman Reigns for a WWE World Heavyweight Championship match at WrestleMania 31	
2	Fastlane (2016)	February 21, 2016	Cleveland, Ohio	Quicken Loans Arena	Brock Lesnar vs. Dean Ambrose vs. Roman Reigns in a triple threat match for a WWE World Heavyweight Championship match at WrestleMania 32	
3	Fastlane (2017)	March 5, 2017	Milwaukee, Wisconsin	Bradley Center	Kevin Owens (c) vs. Goldberg for the WWE Universal Championship	
4	Fastlane (2018)	March 11, 2018	Columbus, Ohio	Nationwide Arena	AJ Styles (c) vs. Baron Corbin vs. Dolph Ziggler vs. John Cena vs. Kevin Owens vs. Sami Zayn in a Six-Pack Challenge for the WWE Championship	
5	Fastlane (2019)	March 10, 2019	Cleveland, Ohio	Quicken Loans Arena	The Shield (Dean Ambrose, Seth Rollins, and Roman Reigns) vs. Baron Corbin, Bobby Lashley, and Drew McIntyre in a six-man tag team match	
6	Fastlane (2021)	March 21, 2021	St. Petersburg, Florida	WWE ThunderDome at Tropicana Field	Roman Reigns (c) vs. Daniel Bryan for the WWE Universal Championship with Edge as the special guest enforcer	
7	Fastlane (2023)	October 7, 2023	Indianapolis, Indiana	Gainbridge Fieldhouse	Seth "Freakin" Rollins (c) vs. Shinsuke Nakamura in a Last Man Standing match for the World Heavyweight Championship	
(c) – refers to the champion(s) heading into the match

== See also ==
- List of WWE pay-per-view and livestreaming supercards
