= Fastlane (2017) =

WWE pay-per-view and livestreaming event

- Promotional poster featuring Goldberg
- Promotion: WWE
- Brand: Raw
- Date: March 5, 2017
- City: Milwaukee, Wisconsin
- Venue: BMO Harris Bradley Center
- Attendance: 15,785

WWE event chronology
← Previous; Elimination Chamber	Next → NXT TakeOver: Orlando

Fastlane chronology
← Previous; 2016	Next → 2018

The 2017 Fastlane was a professional wrestling pay-per-view (PPV) and livestreaming event produced by WWE, held exclusively for wrestlers from the promotion's main roster brand, Raw. It was the third annual Fastlane and took place on March 5, 2017, at the BMO Harris Bradley Center in Milwaukee, Wisconsin. The event's name was a reference to its position on the "Road to WrestleMania".

Ten matches were contested at the event, including one on the Kickoff pre-show. In the main event, Goldberg defeated Kevin Owens to win the WWE Universal Championship, becoming the only person to win the Universal Championship, WWE's previous World Heavyweight Championship, and the WCW World Heavyweight Championship. In other prominent matches, Roman Reigns defeated Braun Strowman, ending Strowman's undefeated streak, Bayley retained the Raw Women's Championship against Charlotte Flair, thus ending Flair's undefeated streak in singles matches at PPVs, Neville retained the WWE Cruiserweight Championship against Gentleman Jack Gallagher, and Luke Gallows and Karl Anderson retained the Raw Tag Team Championship against Enzo Amore and Big Cass.

This was the first Fastlane event to be brand exclusive, following the reintroduction of the brand split in July 2016, and the first non-WrestleMania PPV and livestreaming event to take place in March. This was also WWE's last PPV and livestreaming event to take place at the Bradley Center before its closure in 2018 with future WWE events in Milwaukee held at Fiserv Forum.

== Production ==
=== Background ===
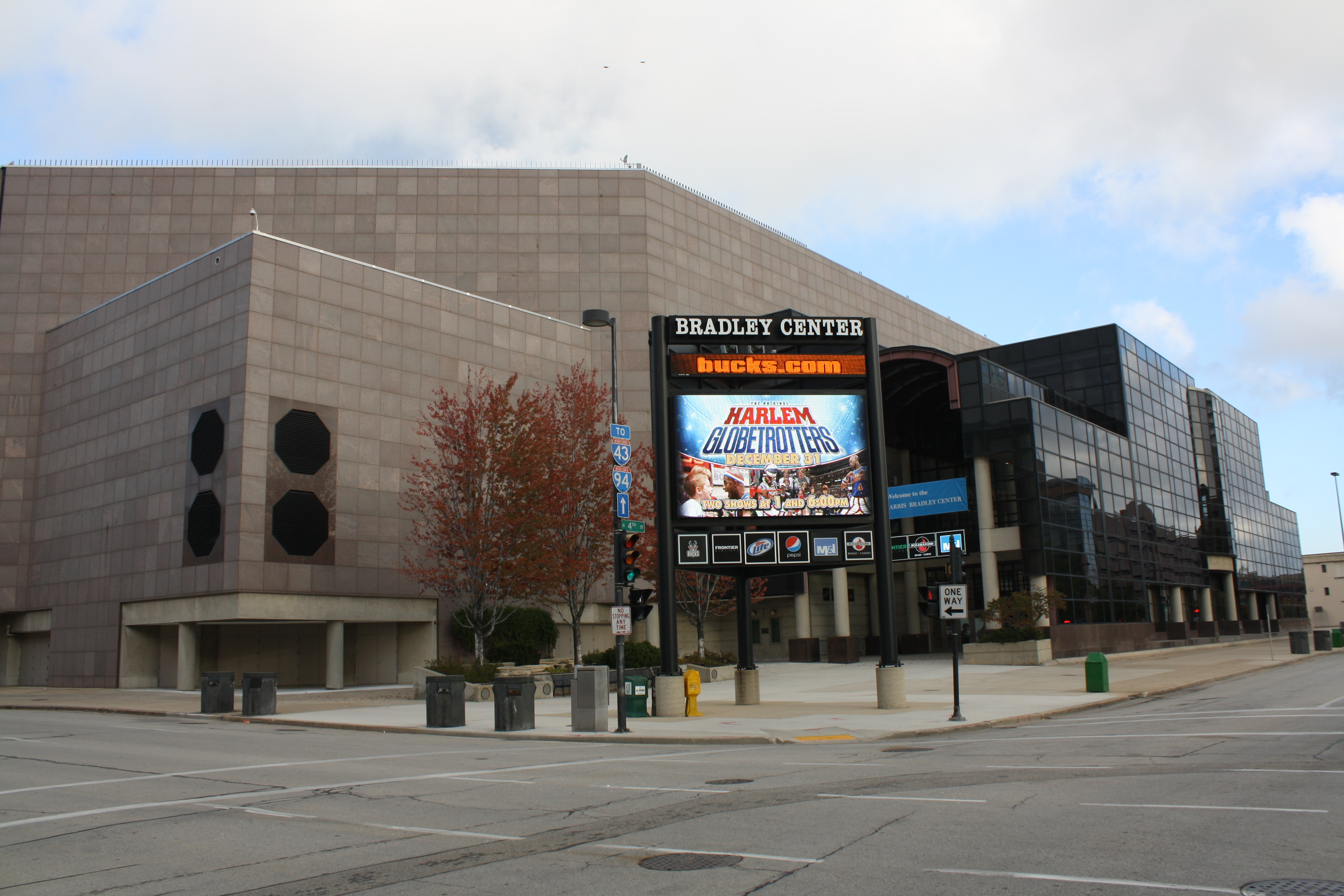
The third annual Fastlane was held at the BMO Harris Bradley Center in Milwaukee, Wisconsin, which was WWE's last pay-per-view and livestreaming event to take place at the venue before its closure in 2018.

Fastlane was an annual professional wrestling pay-per-view (PPV) and livestreaming event first produced by WWE in 2015. The name of the event was a reference to its position on the "Road to WrestleMania", being held in the two-month period between the Royal Rumble and WWE's flagship event. While the first two Fastlane events were held in February, on October 22, 2016, the third event was scheduled for March 5, 2017, at the BMO Harris Bradley Center in Milwaukee, Wisconsin, which made it the first Fastlane to be held in March, and in turn WWE's first non-WrestleMania PPV and livestreaming event to be held during that month. Tickets went on sale on December 16, 2016, through Ticketmaster. In addition to airing on traditional pay-per-view, the event was livestreamed on the WWE Network.

In July 2016, WWE reintroduced the brand extension where the promotion divided its main roster between the Raw and SmackDown brands where the wrestlers were exclusively assigned to perform (the original brand extension ended in August 2011). Each brand also received its own exclusive monthly PPV and livestreaming events. The 2017 Fastlane was in turn held exclusively for Raw.

=== Storylines ===
The event comprised 10 matches, including one on the Kickoff pre-show, that resulted from scripted storylines. Results were predetermined by WWE's writers on the Raw brand, while storylines were produced on WWE's weekly television shows, Monday Night Raw and the cruiserweight-exclusive 205 Live.

On the January 2, 2017, episode of Raw, Goldberg was the first guest on The Kevin Owens Show, where he confronted WWE Universal Champion Kevin Owens. Goldberg declared that he would win the Royal Rumble on January 29 and face the Universal Champion at WrestleMania 33. After eliminating Brock Lesnar from the Royal Rumble match but failing to win, Goldberg accepted Lesnar's challenge for a final match at WrestleMania 33 after interrupting Owens' and United States Champion Chris Jericho's promo. After Owens mocked Goldberg, Goldberg then challenged Owens for the Universal Championship at Fastlane. Jericho accepted the match on the behalf of Owens and it was made official later that night. Owens was initially mad at the decision, but conceded, knowing that Jericho would have his back in the match. However, the following week on Raw, Owens turned on Jericho during Jericho's "Festival of Friendship" for Owens, brutally attacking Jericho, who was taken to a medical facility. On the February 20 episode of Raw, Owens shifted his focus to Goldberg. He insulted Goldberg and stated that he would outsmart him at Fastlane. Owens then stopped short of explaining his attack on Jericho. Goldberg appeared the following week to address the comments made by Owens and promised that he would defeat Owens and be the Universal Champion going into his WrestleMania 33 match with Lesnar. Owens came out, touted how he had defeated everyone he had faced, and then said that he would end Goldberg at Fastlane.

Also on the January 2 episode of Raw during the first edition of The Kevin Owens Show, Braun Strowman announced that he would be in the Royal Rumble match. Roman Reigns came out to confront those in the ring and declared that he would defeat Kevin Owens for the WWE Universal Championship at the Royal Rumble. After a stare down, Reigns and Goldberg double-speared Strowman. At Royal Rumble, Strowman attacked Reigns during his Universal Championship match against Owens. The following night on Raw, Strowman revealed that he had helped Owens retain the title due to his dislike of Reigns and because Owens had promised him a title shot. Owens denied this, but Strowman showed footage confirming his claim. General Manager Mick Foley then scheduled the match for later that night, where Strowman won by disqualification when Reigns interfered in the match and attacked Strowman. On the February 6 episode of Raw, after easily dispatching of four local competitors, Strowman demanded better competition from Foley, who then scheduled Strowman to face Reigns at Fastlane. During Reigns' match against Samoa Joe later that night, Strowman came out and caused a distraction for Reigns, allowing Joe to win. Strowman then attacked Reigns. The following week, Reigns demanded to face Strowman that night but Commissioner Stephanie McMahon denied his request and warned Reigns that if he interferes in the match between Strowman and Mark Henry, his Fastlane bout with Strowman would be canceled. Due to this, Reigns waited until after the match to confront Strowman. After Strowman defeated Henry, Reigns came out and performed two Superman Punches on Strowman, but got powerslammed. On the February 20 episode, after Strowman defeated Big Show, Reigns again confronted Strowman, but was again overpowered. The following week, Strowman demanded to have a contract signing with Reigns so that Reigns would not back out of their match. Reigns came out for the contract signing and a brawl ensued immediately.

At the Royal Rumble, Neville captured the WWE Cruiserweight Championship by defeating Rich Swann. The following night on Raw, Neville came out for a "coronation", but was interrupted by Swann, who stated that he would get a rematch, and then a brawl ensued. The next night on 205 Live, it was revealed that Swann got injured during their confrontation on Raw. On the February 6 episode of Raw, Austin Aries revealed to Neville that a fatal five-way elimination match between T. J. Perkins, Tony Nese, Cedric Alexander, Noam Dar, and Gentleman Jack Gallagher was scheduled for the following night on 205 Live to determine the number one contender for Neville at Fastlane. The next night on 205 Live, it was announced that Nese suffered an injury on Raw and that his spot would be taken by the winner of a match between Mustafa Ali and Ariya Daivari; Ali defeated Daivari to qualify for the Fatal 5-Way match later on. In the fatal five-way, Gallagher last eliminated Perkins to become the number one contender. On the February 20 episode of Raw, the two had a contract signing. A short scuffle occurred and Neville retreated. The next night on 205 Live, Gallagher defeated Nese to show that he was ready for Neville at Fastlane. The following episode of Raw, Neville teamed with Nese to face Gallagher and Perkins, which Gallagher won for his team when he made Nese submit. On the following 205 Live, Neville addressed the entire cruiserweight locker room. He said that 205 Live was supposed to showcase the best cruiserweights, but faltered before his arrival. He was interrupted by Gallagher, and the two brawled with Gallagher getting the upper hand.

On the Royal Rumble Kickoff pre-show, Luke Gallows and Karl Anderson defeated Cesaro and Sheamus to win the Raw Tag Team Championship. Cesaro and Sheamus invoked their rematch clause for the February 6 episode of Raw, but were unsuccessful due to interference from Enzo Amore and Big Cass. This led to a match the following week, where Cesaro defeated Amore. However, on the February 20 episode, Amore and Cass defeated Cesaro and Sheamus to become the number one contenders for the Raw Tag Team Championship at Fastlane.

On the February 13 episode of Raw, Bayley defeated Charlotte Flair to capture her first Raw Women's Championship, thanks to help from Sasha Banks. The following week, Stephanie McMahon told Bayley to give the championship back due to the interference from Banks. Banks came out and defended Bayley, who decided to keep the title. Flair then came out and invoked her rematch clause for Fastlane, and Banks immediately challenged Flair to a match that she won. On the February 27 episode, Bayley and Banks teamed up to face Flair and Nia Jax where Jax pinned Bayley. Afterwards backstage, Banks said she would have Bayley's back in her Fastlane match against Flair. Stephanie appeared, overhearing what Banks had said and scheduled Banks to face Jax at Fastlane.

On the February 13 episode of Raw, Samoa Joe, who had his Raw debut match the previous week, had a sitdown interview with Michael Cole about Joe finally making it to Raw after a long career. Joe made a comment about Sami Zayn, stating that he was not like Zayn, who is just happy to be on Raw. Later, after Zayn defeated Rusev, Zayn called out Joe about the comment. He agreed that Joe is not like him because he does not clean up other peoples messes, referring to Joe attacking Seth Rollins on behalf of Triple H. Joe then blindsided Zayn. The following week, Zayn was scheduled to face Kevin Owens, but Joe attacked Zayn before the match, enabling Owens to easily defeat him. On the February 27 episode, after Joe defeated Cesaro, he was interviewed by Charlie Caruso. Caruso asked how Joe has managed to have a huge impact on Raw in such a short time, and Joe said that he came to Raw to hurt people. Zayn then appeared and attacked Joe, and the two were separated by security.

Akira Tozawa, who had competed in the Cruiserweight Classic in mid-2016, made his 205 Live debut on the January 31 episode, where he defeated Aaron Solow. During the match, The Brian Kendrick joined the announce team to observe Tozawa. Tozawa then had his Raw debut on February 6, where he defeated Drew Gulak. After the match, Kendrick came out to offer his congratulations and shook his hand. On the following episode of 205 Live, Kendrick praised Tozawa, stating that he sees potential in him. On the February 13 episode of Raw, Kendrick joined the announce team for Tozawa's win over Aria Daivari, where Kendrick referred to Tozawa as his protégé. The next night on 205 Live, Tozawa turned down Kendrick's offer of mentorship, stating that he does not like Kendrick. Also that episode, Rich Swann returned from injury and defeated Noam Dar and trashed talked his girlfriend, Alicia Fox. On the following episode of Raw, Tozawa was scheduled to face Kendrick. Before their match, however, he refused Kendrick's handshake, which led to Kendrick attacking Tozawa and the match not happening. The two then had their match on 205 Live, where Kendrick won by count-out. On the following Raw, after Tozawa defeated Noam Dar, Kendrick came out and attacked Tozawa. A tag team match pitting Tozawa and Swann against Kendrick and Dar was scheduled for the Fastlane Kickoff pre-show. On the February 28 episode of 205 Live, Tozawa said that he had rejected Kendrick because although he respects him, he wants to make it on his own and that he wants to fight, before being attacked by Kendrick.

== Event ==
Other on-screen personnel
Role:	Name:
English commentators	Michael Cole (PPV + pre-show)
English commentators	Corey Graves (PPV + pre-show)
English commentators	Byron Saxton (PPV)
English commentators	Austin Aries (WWE Cruiserweight Championship match + pre-show)
Spanish commentators	Carlos Cabrera
Spanish commentators	Marcelo Rodríguez
Japanese commentators	Shun Yamaguchi
Japanese commentators	Funaki
German commentators	Tim Haber
German commentators	Calvin Knie
Ring announcer	JoJo
Referees	Chad Patton
Referees	Darrick Moore
Referees	John Cone
Referees	Rod Zapata
Backstage interviewers	Charly Caruso
Pre-show panel	Renee Young
Pre-show panel	Booker T
Pre-show panel	Peter Rosenberg
Raw Talk panel	Renee Young
Raw Talk panel	Peter Rosenberg

=== Pre-show ===
During the Fastlane Kickoff pre-show, Akira Tozawa and Rich Swann faced The Brian Kendrick and Noam Dar. Swann performed a "Phoenix Splash" on Dar to win the match.

Also on the pre-show, Rusev and Jinder Mahal split-up as a tag team. Mick Foley declared that both would have a match on the main show against unknown opponents and the two would have to choose who would compete first.

=== Preliminary matches ===
The actual pay-per-view opened with Samoa Joe facing Sami Zayn. In the end, as Zayn attempted a "Helluva Kick" on Joe, Joe countered into an "STJoe" on Zayn and applied the "Coquina Clutch" on Zayn. Zayn passed out, resulting in Joe winning the match by technical submission.

Next, Luke Gallows and Karl Anderson defended the Raw Tag Team Championship against Enzo Amore and Big Cass. In the climax, Anderson performed a "Rocket Kick" on Amore. Amore placed his foot on the bottom rope, only for Gallows to push Amore's foot off the rope before the referee noticed, thus Gallows and Anderson retained the titles.

Later, Sasha Banks faced Nia Jax. Banks pinned Jax with a roll-up whilst bridging for the win.

After that, Rusev and Jinder Mahal made their entrances to face unknown opponents. In the ring, Mahal attacked Rusev, taking Rusev out temporarily. Mahal competed first and his opponent was revealed to be Cesaro. In the end, Rusev recovered and distracted Mahal, allowing to Cesaro perform a "Pop Up European Uppercut" on Mahal for the win. Post-match, Rusev attacked Mahal. Big Show was revealed as Rusev's opponent. Big Show performed three chokeslams and a "KO Punch" on Rusev to win the match.

Next, Neville defended the WWE Cruiserweight Championship against Gentleman Jack Gallagher. Neville performed the "Red Arrow" on Gallagher to retain the title.

After that, Roman Reigns faced Braun Strowman. Strowman performed a running powerslam through an announce table on Reigns. Reigns performed a spear on Strowman for a near-fall. Reigns then performed two "Superman Punches" on Strowman but Strowman overpowered Reigns. As Strowman attempted a "Diving Splash", Reigns avoided and performed a spear on Strowman for the win, marking the first time Strowman was pinned, thus ending his undefeated streak.

Later, Bayley defended the Raw Women's Championship against Charlotte Flair. Sasha Banks appeared and distracted Charlotte, allowing Bayley to perform a "Bayley-to-Belly" on Charlotte outside the ring. As Charlotte tried to pin Bayley with a roll-up by grabbing her tights, Banks notified the referee, who stopped the pin. Bayley then performed another "Bayley-to-Belly" on Charlotte to retain the title, marking Charlotte's first loss in a singles match on pay-per-view.

=== Main event ===
In the main event, Kevin Owens defended the Universal Championship against Goldberg. Before the match began, Owens repeatedly stalled and rolled out of the ring, taunting Goldberg, and then finally entered the ring to begin the match. As the match began, United States Champion Chris Jericho's music played and he appeared on the stage, which distracted Owens. Goldberg took advantage and executed a spear and a "Jackhammer" on Owens to win the title. This turned Goldberg's WrestleMania 33 match against Brock Lesnar into a championship match for the Universal Championship.

== Reception ==
Critical reception of Fastlane was mixed-to-negative, with praise directed at the Cruiserweight match, Samoa Joe vs Sami Zayn, and Roman Reigns vs Braun Strowman. Criticism was directed at the event's conclusion, as well as what some journalists have considered questionable booking decisions, especially the title match between Kevin Owens and Goldberg.

Bryan Alvarez of the Wrestling Observer Newsletter was left incensed by Fastlane, even though it was "not a bad show" as "there was some good wrestling": Joe-Zayn, Reigns-Strowman, and in particular Gallagher-Neville, which by itself was worth the WWE Network subscription of $9.99 to Alvarez. What infuriated Alvarez was the show's booking, as WWE promoted "stats and records" but just "whittled them all away ... for fucking nothing, at Fastlane"; whether be it Jax's winning streak, Charlotte's 18 PPV win streak, or Strowman never being pinned or submitted. In the latter case, Alvarez was not happy with Reigns being the choice to vanquish Strowman.

Jason Powell of Pro Wrestling Dot Net declared Fastlane "a really disappointing show with a lot of questionable creative decisions." Powell took issue with Strowman's "first high profile loss ... in the latest attempt to make Reigns the top babyface", as Powell felt it was "premature". Powell also criticized that the women's title storylines "isn't making anyone look good", citing that it was strange that "Nia loses a rare match" and "Charlotte's pay-per-view winning streak ends because the babyface received help after telling the heel to leave her buddy backstage so they could find out who the better woman was". Earlier that night, Powell noted Rusev "was absolutely destroyed by Big Show to the point that if this were a different era I would just assume he was leaving the territory". Powell was positive on the cruiserweight title match as the "highlight of the show thus far. They worked really hard and some of the near falls were well received".

Mike Johnson of PWInsider felt that Fastlane was "pretty lackluster over all" until the Strowman-Reigns match, which was "bordering on great" when the "latter minutes of the match were very good". However, Johnson thought that Reigns pinning Strowman "was the wrong call". For the women's title match, Johnson felt that the match "was good, but the ending was more to set up issues leading into Wrestlemania than anything else." As for the main event, Johnson simply declared that since Goldberg won the title, then "Internet angry".

Mike Tedesco of WrestleView thought Fastlane was only a "so-so to ok PPV" as it "definitely dragged at times for sure and felt like Sunday Night RAW". Tedesco highlighted that the "Reigns/Strowman match overdelivered" as a "great match", but he was dissatisfied as it "just wasn't necessary" for Reigns to beat Strowman via pin when WWE "routinely comes up with screwy finishes for Raw main events". On the undercard, Joe-Zayn "did a really nice job making [Joe] look like an unstoppable, dangerous monster"; the tag title match would have been "fine for RAW, but there was nothing special"; Banks-Jax was "not really a great match" as Jax "just isn't polished enough for the main roster". Tedesco also felt watching "Jinder Mahal wrestle a singles match on a PPV, even though PPVs aren't what they used to be, is just unacceptable." As for the main event, Tedesco approved of how it happened, as he felt "Goldberg involved in a long match would hurt his aura".

== Aftermath ==
The following night on Raw, new Universal Champion Goldberg came out but was interrupted by Brock Lesnar and Paul Heyman. Lesnar attempted to shake Goldberg's hand to congratulate him, but Goldberg refused. Heyman then said that Goldberg would be "Brock's bitch" at WrestleMania and Lesnar attacked Goldberg with an F-5. The following week, Lesnar and Heyman gloated about Lesnar's attack on Goldberg. On the final Raw before WrestleMania, Goldberg and Lesnar had one last confrontation where Goldberg speared Lesnar.

United States Champion Chris Jericho came out and said that he screwed Kevin Owens out of the Universal Championship because Owens betrayed him. He called out Owens, wanting to know why he betrayed him. Owens said he was never Jericho's friend and that he only used him; Jericho became useless to him when he accepted Goldberg's challenge for the Universal title. Jericho then challenged Owens to a match at WrestleMania 33. Owens agreed only if it were for the United States Championship, and Jericho agreed. Owens said he would eventually get a rematch for the Universal title, but wanted to take the United States title from Jericho first. A brawl ensued and Samoa Joe and Sami Zayn got involved. Owens then defeated Zayn and Jericho lost to Joe by count-out. On the March 27 episode of Raw, Zayn defeated Owens to earn a spot in the 2017 André the Giant Memorial Battle Royal; had he lost, he would have been fired. Joe attempted to interfere in the match, but Jericho made the save. Other Raw wrestlers confirmed for the WrestleMania pre-show battle royal included, Big Show, Goldust, R-Truth, The Shining Stars, Curtis Axel, Bo Dallas, Mark Henry, Sin Cara, Titus O'Neil, and Jinder Mahal. Mahal's former partner Rusev took time off to have shoulder surgery. The chain of events is what caused Jericho to depart from the WWE in 2018 and made him wrestle elsewhere.

Raw Women's Champion Bayley came out to address the controversy over her win. Sasha Banks came out and said that the two should face each other at WrestleMania for the title. Charlotte Flair came out and said she should get a rematch. Mick Foley scheduled Flair to face Banks in a number one contender's match, but Stephanie McMahon instead decided to keep Flair in the championship match at WrestleMania, and Banks could be added to the match if she defeated Bayley that night. Banks defeated Bayley, making the Raw Women's Championship match at WrestleMania 33 a triple threat match. The following week, Flair turned on her ally Dana Brooke after Brooke lost to Banks. On the March 20 episode, Nia Jax defeated Bayley and was added to the WrestleMania championship match, making it a fatal four-way elimination match.

Braun Strowman called out Roman Reigns, stating that Reigns got lucky. Instead of Reigns, The Undertaker came out. After a stare down, Strowman left the ring. As Undertaker was about to leave, Reigns came out. Reigns confronted Undertaker, and said that Strowman had called him out, not the deadman, before declaring the ring as his yard now. After a stare down, both looked at the WrestleMania sign and Undertaker chokeslammed Reigns. A match between Undertaker and Reigns at WrestleMania was made official the following week. Reigns and Strowman had their Fastlane rematch on the March 20 episode, but were interrupted by The Undertaker, who chokeslammed Strowman, and Reigns performed a spear on Undertaker. Strowman was then confirmed for the 2017 André the Giant Memorial Battle Royal.

Rich Swann, who was still owed a Cruiserweight Championship rematch against Neville, invoked his rematch, but lost. Neville was then interviewed by Austin Aries. Neville said there was no one left in the cruiserweight division that could compete with him. Aries, however, disagreed, and attacked Neville, insinuating his desire to challenge Neville for the title. The following night on 205 Live, Aries announced his return to in-ring competition and then defeated Tony Nese. The following week, Aries won a fatal five-way elimination match to face Neville on the WrestleMania pre-show. Also in the cruiserweight division, after Akira Tozawa defeated Ariya Daivari, Tozawa called out The Brian Kendrick for a match. Kendrick came out and said he would have an answer on 205 Live. On 205 Live, instead of accepting the challenge then, Kendrick had Arik Cannon fight Tozawa in the guise of "Bryan Kendrick", who Tozawa defeated. The two finally faced each other on the March 28 episode of 205 Live where Kendrick defeated Tozawa.

Enzo Amore and Big Cass had a rematch with Luke Gallows and Karl Anderson for the Raw Tag Team Championship. However, Cesaro and Sheamus interfered in the match, allowing Gallows and Anderson to retain their titles by disqualification. It was then announced that on the next episode, Enzo and Cass would face Cesaro and Sheamus to determine the number one contenders for the tag titles at WrestleMania 33. That episode, however, Gallows and Anderson attacked both teams, causing a double-disqualification, and Mick Foley scheduled the champions to defend their titles against both teams at WrestleMania. The following week, Cesaro and Sheamus retained their spot in the triple threat match by defeating Gallows, Anderson, Amore, and Cass in a two-on-four handicap match. The following week, the match was made a triple threat tag team ladder match.

A video of Seth Rollins' rehabilitation was shown and Triple H responded that Rollins' ignorant for going against doctors advice and trying to compete against him at WrestleMania. The following week, Mick Foley got into an altercation with Triple H. Rollins came out on a crutch, but then dropped the crutch and attacked Triple H, showing that he was cleared to compete. Triple H recovered and attacked Rollins' knee. On the March 20 episode, Foley was fired as Raw General Manager and Triple H challenged Rollins to an unsanctioned match at WrestleMania, which would keep Rollins from suing the WWE should he get injured again, and Rollins accepted.

While the 2017 Fastlane was held exclusively for Raw, the 2018 event was held exclusively for SmackDown. This was also WWE's last PPV and livestreaming event to take place at the Bradley Center before its closure in 2018 with future WWE events in Milwaukee held at Fiserv Forum. The final WWE televised event at the venue was the March 5, 2018, episode of Raw.

== Results ==
No.	Results	Stipulations	Times
1^{P}	Rich Swann and Akira Tozawa defeated The Brian Kendrick and Noam Dar (with Alicia Fox) by pinfall	Tag team match	9:25
2	Samoa Joe defeated Sami Zayn by technical submission	Singles match	9:45
3	Luke Gallows and Karl Anderson (c) defeated Enzo Amore and Big Cass by pinfall	Tag team match for the WWE Raw Tag Team Championship	8:40
4	Sasha Banks defeated Nia Jax by pinfall	Singles match	8:15
5	Cesaro (with Sheamus) defeated Jinder Mahal by pinfall	Singles match	8:12
6	Big Show defeated Rusev (with Lana) by pinfall	Singles match	8:40
7	Neville (c) defeated Jack Gallagher by pinfall	Singles match for the WWE Cruiserweight Championship	12:08
8	Roman Reigns defeated Braun Strowman by pinfall	Singles match	17:13
9	Bayley (c) defeated Charlotte Flair by pinfall	Singles match for the WWE Raw Women's Championship	16:49
10	Goldberg defeated Kevin Owens (c) by pinfall	Singles match for the WWE Universal Championship	0:22
(c) / – the champion(s) heading into the match; P / – the match was broadcast on the pre-show
