= Fastlane (2018) =

WWE pay-per-view and livestreaming event

- Promotional poster featuring AJ Styles
- Promotion: WWE
- Brand: SmackDown
- Date: March 11, 2018
- City: Columbus, Ohio
- Venue: Nationwide Arena
- Attendance: 15,119

WWE event chronology
← Previous; Elimination Chamber	Next → NXT TakeOver: New Orleans

Fastlane chronology
← Previous; 2017	Next → 2019

The 2018 Fastlane was a professional wrestling pay-per-view (PPV) and livestreaming event produced by WWE, held exclusively for wrestlers from the promotion's main roster brand, SmackDown. It was fourth annual Fastlane and took place on March 11, 2018, at the Nationwide Arena in Columbus, Ohio. The event's name was a reference to its position on the "Road to WrestleMania".

Seven matches were contested at the event, including one on the Kickoff pre-show. In the main event, AJ Styles retained the WWE Championship in a six-pack challenge against Kevin Owens, Sami Zayn, Baron Corbin, Dolph Ziggler, and John Cena. In other prominent matches, Randy Orton defeated Bobby Roode to win his first United States Championship, becoming the 18th Grand Slam Champion in the process, and Charlotte Flair retained the SmackDown Women's Championship against Ruby Riott, after which, women's Royal Rumble winner Asuka from Raw made her SmackDown debut to challenge Flair for the title at WrestleMania 34.

This was the final main roster PPV and livestreaming event to be brand-exclusive under the second brand split as following WrestleMania 34 the following month, WWE discontinued these types of events with further events held for all main roster brands. This in turn made it the final brand-exclusive Fastlane, as well as the final SmackDown-exclusive PPV and livestreaming event, with a minor exception of Smackville in July 2019, which was originally scheduled as a non-televised SmackDown-exclusive house show but had a portion of it livestreamed exclusively as a WWE Network special.

== Production ==
=== Background ===
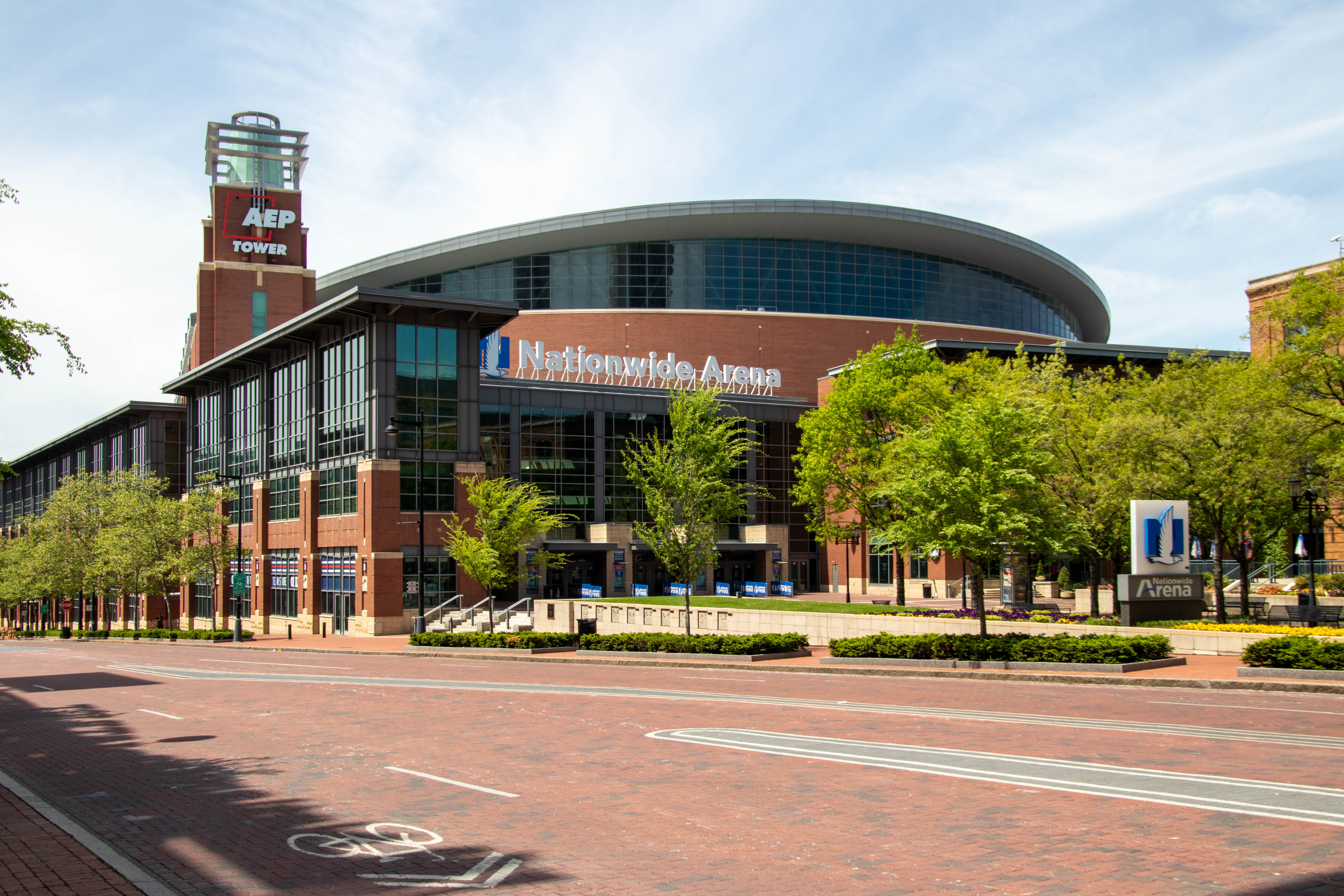
The fourth annual Fastlane was held at the Nationwide Arena in Columbus, Ohio.

Fastlane was an annual professional wrestling pay-per-view (PPV) and livestreaming event first produced by WWE in 2015. The name of the event was a reference to its position on the "Road to WrestleMania", being held in the two-month period between the Royal Rumble and WWE's flagship event. The first two Fastlane events were held in February before moving to March. Announced on December 4, 2017, the fourth event was scheduled for March 11, 2018, at the Nationwide Arena in Columbus, Ohio. The event aired on pay-per-view worldwide and was livestreamed on the WWE Network. While the 2017 event was Raw-exclusive, the 2018 event exclusively featured wrestlers from the SmackDown brand division.Tickets went on sale on December 8, 2017, through Ticketmaster.

=== Storylines ===
The event comprised seven matches, including one on the Kickoff pre-show, that resulted from scripted storylines. Results were predetermined by WWE's writers on the SmackDown brand, while storylines were produced on WWE's weekly television show, SmackDown Live.

At the Royal Rumble, AJ Styles defeated Kevin Owens and Sami Zayn in a handicap match to retain the WWE Championship, although Owens, who was pinned, was not the legal man. On the following episode of SmackDown, Owens and Zayn interrupted 2018 Men's Royal Rumble winner Shinsuke Nakamura and said that they should be the co-WWE Champions, but the referee failed at his job. Styles and Nakamura then teamed up and defeated Owens and Zayn. During the match, there were tensions between Owens and Zayn as a result of General Manager Daniel Bryan scheduling them to face each other the following week to determine the number one contender for the WWE Championship at Fastlane. Their match ended in a double disqualification, however, as Styles was provoked by Zayn and attacked both men, leading to Bryan scheduling a triple threat match between the three for the title. Commissioner Shane McMahon then announced on Twitter that the winner of a match between Dolph Ziggler and Baron Corbin the following week would be added to the championship match to make it a fatal four-way. Before that match started, Owens and Zayn attacked Corbin in the backstage area and later went after Ziggler to prevent either from being added. In response, Shane scheduled Owens to face Corbin and Zayn to face Ziggler, with both Corbin and Ziggler being added if they won their respective matches, while also threatening that if Owens or Zayn interfered in the other's match, that person would be removed from the title match. Corbin and Ziggler won their respective matches, thus making it a fatal five-way for the WWE Championship at Fastlane. On the February 27 episode, John Cena, a free agent who could appear on Raw and SmackDown and who was unsuccessful in becoming the number one contender for Raw's Universal Championship at Elimination Chamber two nights prior, made his return to SmackDown, determined to earn a match at WrestleMania 34. Bryan gave him the opportunity to be added to the WWE Championship match at Fastlane if he could defeat Styles in a non-title match. Cena defeated Styles, turning the championship match into a six-pack challenge. A brawl then ensued between all six competitors. To keep himself from being interrupted, Cena appeared on the March 5 episode of Raw and said that he would break his and Ric Flair's officially recognized tied record and become a 17-time world champion, and said that Styles should use his rematch clause to make the WWE Championship match at WrestleMania a triple threat match with Nakamura. On the final SmackDown before Fastlane, Owens and Zayn caused a double disqualification in a match between Styles and Ziggler; a five-way match with the addition of Corbin was scheduled, which saw Zayn score the win by turning on and pinning Owens.

Immediately following the Royal Rumble, General Manager Daniel Bryan announced that there would be a first-ever "SmackDown Top Ten List" as voted on by the SmackDown roster. Bryan said the list would show who the wrestlers thought should get a title opportunity, but a wrestler could not vote for themselves. The Top Ten List was revealed on the February 6 episode of SmackDown. The following week, United States Champion Bobby Roode, Jinder Mahal with Sunil Singh, and Randy Orton all exchanged words as Mahal made fun of their spots on the list despite Mahal not ranking at all; Orton and Roode were 9th and 5th, respectively. The segment ended after Orton attacked Sunil with an RKO, and Mahal performed the Khallas on Roode and Orton. The next episode, Mahal again called out Roode and Orton, and a brawl broke out in which Roode attacked Orton with a Glorious DDT, but suffered a Khallas from Mahal, who stood tall once again. Despite this, Commissioner Shane McMahon scheduled Roode to face Orton for the United States Championship at Fastlane. The following week in a backstage interview, Roode said that in order to be the greatest United States Champion of all time, he would have to beat the best, and said that Orton was one of the best of all time. Orton interrupted and said the U.S. title was the one title he had never held during his WWE career and would be taking it from Roode at Fastlane. On the final SmackDown before Fastlane, Mahal defeated Orton due to an interference by Roode.

Throughout 2017, The Usos (Jey Uso and Jimmy Uso) and The New Day (Big E, Kofi Kingston, and Xavier Woods) wrestled at numerous events over the SmackDown Tag Team Championship, with the original feud ending at Hell in a Cell with The Usos victorious. The Usos's next feud were with Chad Gable and Shelton Benjamin, who were unsuccessful in gaining the title at the Royal Rumble. On the February 20 episode of SmackDown, Gable and Benjamin had another opportunity to become the number one contenders against The Usos for the SmackDown Tag Team Championship at Fastlane, but were defeated by The New Day's Big E and Woods, thus reigniting an old feud. The following week, The New Day said that they wanted to be the SmackDown Tag Team Champions going into WrestleMania 34. The Usos interrupted and said that they had been with WWE for a number of years, but had never had a spot on the main card at WrestleMania and said that would not be the case at WrestleMania 34. As the two teams had a confrontation, they were interrupted by The Bludgeon Brothers (Harper and Rowan) and retreated.

At the Royal Rumble, Raw's Asuka won the inaugural women's Royal Rumble match for the right to challenge for either the Raw Women's Championship or SmackDown Women's Championship at WrestleMania 34. The following night on Raw, Raw Commissioner Stephanie McMahon convinced Asuka to wait until after Raw's Elimination Chamber event to make her decision. On SmackDown, this left SmackDown Women's Champion Charlotte Flair to wonder who her WrestleMania opponent would be. The Riott Squad (Ruby Riott, Sarah Logan, and Liv Morgan) interrupted and said Flair would not make it to WrestleMania before attacking her. Over the next couple of weeks, Flair defeated Morgan and Logan in non-title matches. On the February 20 episode, Flair teamed with Becky Lynch and Naomi in a six-woman tag team match against The Riott Squad where Riott pinned Lynch. Later that episode, Flair offered to put her title on the line at Fastlane against Riott, who accepted.

On the February 27 episode of SmackDown, Shinsuke Nakamura defeated Aiden English. The following week, English and Rusev interrupted a backstage interview with Nakamura, with Rusev challenging Nakamura to a match at Fastlane for damaging English's vocal cords and Nakamura accepted.

On the March 6 episode of SmackDown, Becky Lynch defeated Ms. Money in the Bank Carmella by submission. Later, a tag team match between Becky Lynch and Naomi against Natalya and Carmella was scheduled for Fastlane.

== Event ==
Other on-screen personnel
Role:	Name:
English commentators	Tom Phillips
English commentators	Corey Graves
English commentators	Byron Saxton
Spanish commentators	Carlos Cabrera
Spanish commentators	Marcelo Rodríguez
German commentators	Tim Haber
German commentators	Calvin Knie
Ring announcer	Greg Hamilton
Referees	Danilo Anfibio
Referees	Jason Ayers
Referees	Mike Chioda
Referees	Ryan Tran
Interviewers	Renee Young
Interviewers	Charly Caruso
Interviewers	Dasha Fuentes
Pre-show panel	Renee Young
Pre-show panel	Booker T
Pre-show panel	Sam Roberts
Pre-show panel	David Otunga
Talking Smack panel	Renee Young
Talking Smack panel	Sam Roberts

=== Pre-show ===
During the Fastlane Kickoff pre-show, Breezango (Fandango and Tyler Breeze) teamed with Tye Dillinger to battle Chad Gable, Shelton Benjamin, and Mojo Rawley. Dillinger performed a "Tye Breaker" on Rawley for the win.

=== Preliminary matches ===
The actual pay-per-view opened with Shinsuke Nakamura facing Rusev. In the end, Nakamura performed the "Kinshasa" on Rusev to win the match.

Next, Bobby Roode defended the United States Championship against Randy Orton. After catching Roode, who dove off the top rope, with an "RKO", Orton won his first United States Championship, and became the eighteenth Grand Slam Champion in the process. After the match, Jinder Mahal came out to taunt Orton. Roode then performed a "Glorious DDT" on both Mahal and Orton.

After that, Becky Lynch and Naomi faced Natalya and Carmella. After Natalya distracted Lynch with Carmella's Money in the Bank briefcase, Carmella performed a superkick on Lynch for the win.

In the fourth match, The Usos (Jey and Jimmy Uso) defended the SmackDown Tag Team Championship against The New Day (represented by Kofi Kingston and Xavier Woods). In the end, after an evenly contested match and with all four men outside the ring, the match ended in a no contest after The Bludgeon Brothers (Harper and Rowan) came out and severely attacked both teams, with Woods being taken to a local medical center.

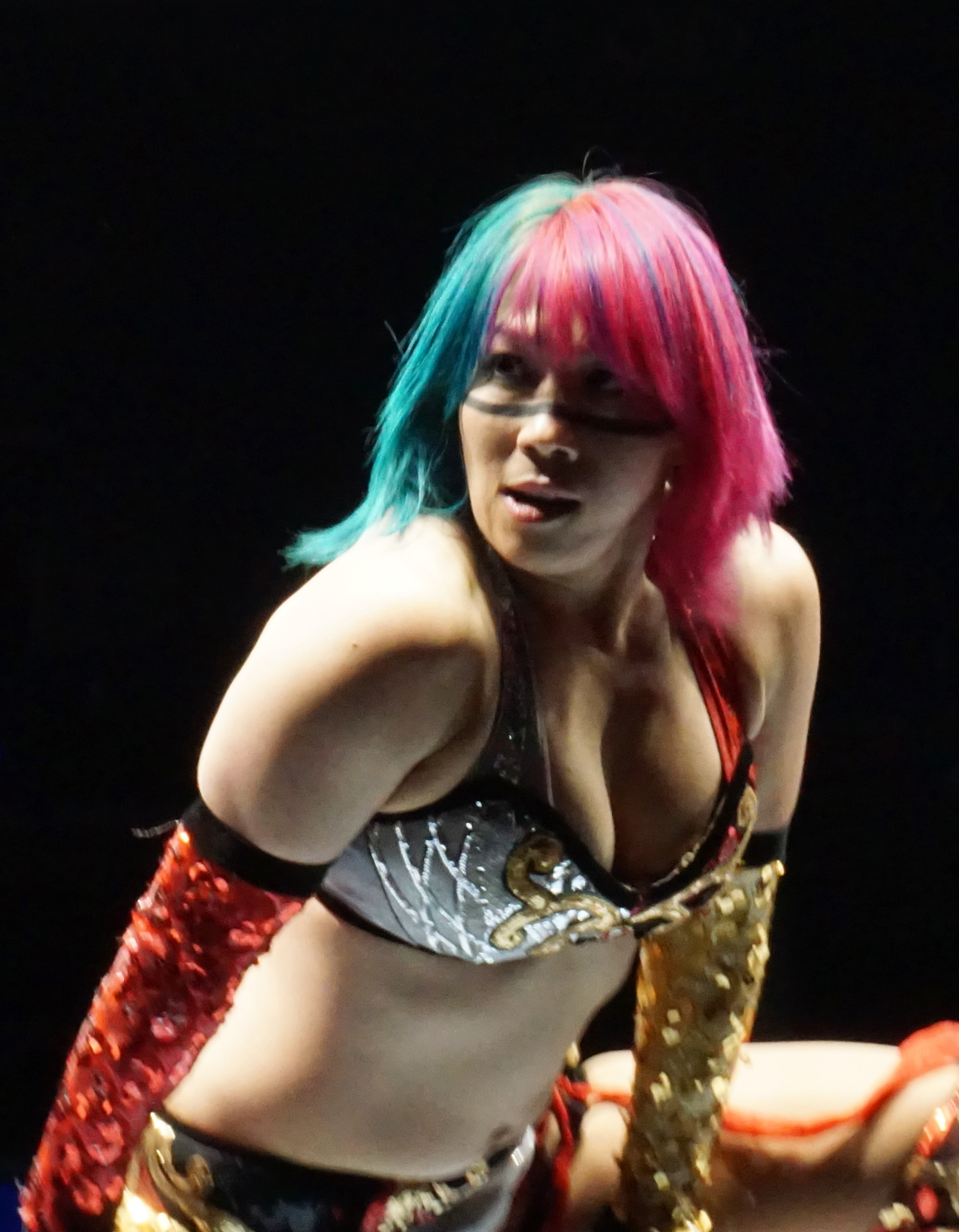
Inaugural women's Royal Rumble winner Asuka from Raw made an appearance at the event and challenged Charlotte Flair for the SmackDown Women's Championship at WrestleMania 34.

In the penultimate match, Charlotte Flair defended the SmackDown Women's Championship against Ruby Riott. During the match, Liv Morgan and Sarah Logan of The Riott Squad ran down to help Riott. Becky Lynch and Naomi came out to even things up, but would all end up being ejected from ringside. In the end, Flair forced Riott to submit to the "Figure-Eight Leglock" to retain the title. After the match, Asuka from Raw made her SmackDown debut. As the women's Royal Rumble winner, she decided to challenge Flair for the SmackDown Women's Championship at WrestleMania 34.

=== Main event ===
In the main event, AJ Styles defended the WWE Championship in a six-pack challenge against John Cena, Kevin Owens, Sami Zayn, Baron Corbin, and Dolph Ziggler. The match immediately began with Cena performing consecutive "Attitude Adjustments" on everyone except Styles, working out as a total of four finishers from him in the early going. Later on in the match, Cena performed an "Attitude Adjustment" on Styles through a broadcast table. Owens and Zayn turned on each other, with Zayn seemingly lying down for Owens. Zayn ultimately tricked Owens and pinned him with a roll-up for a near-fall. SmackDown Commissioner Shane McMahon, who sat at ringside for the match, continuously got involved by breaking up pinfalls that involved Owens and Zayn after Owens performed a superkick on Shane. In the climax, Cena performed an "Attitude Adjustment" on Ziggler. As he was attempting a second on Ziggler, Owens performed a pop-up powerbomb on Cena. Styles then performed a "Phenomenal Forearm" on Owens to retain the WWE Championship, solidifying his match-up against Shinsuke Nakamura at WrestleMania 34.

== Aftermath ==
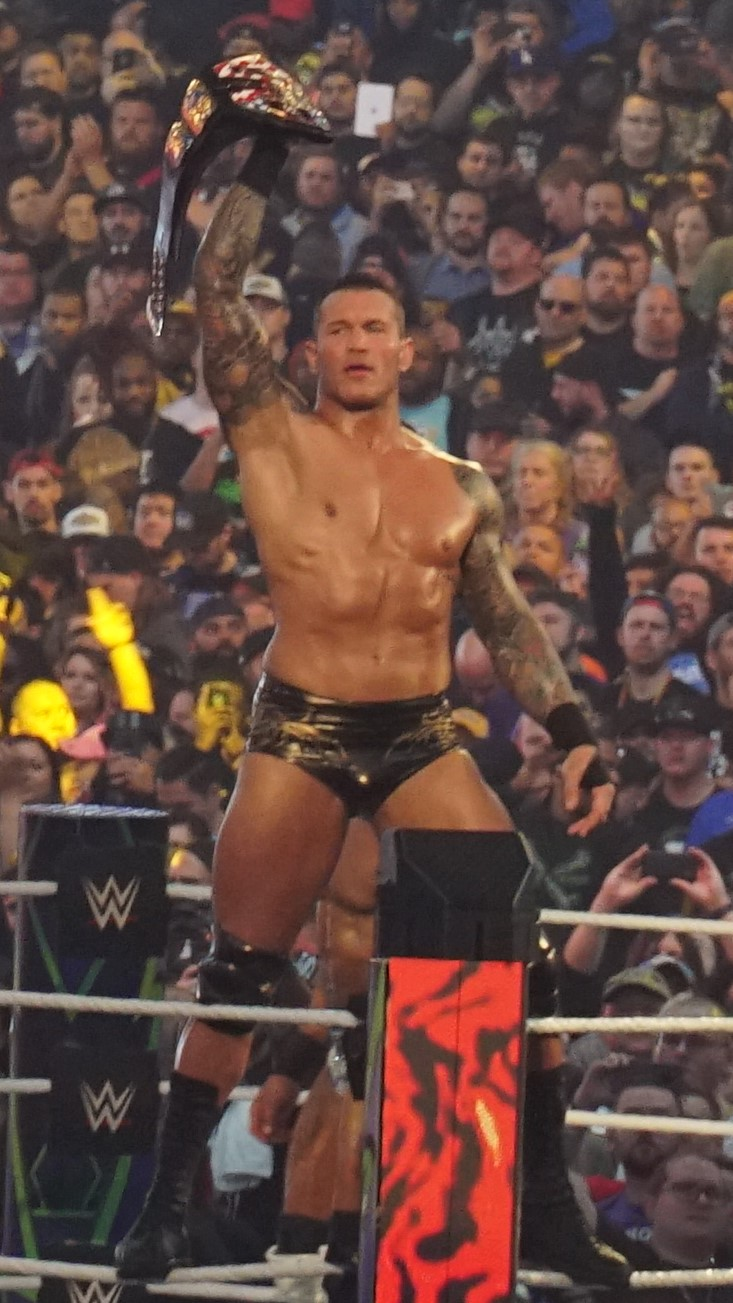
Randy Orton defeated Bobby Roode to win the United States Championship for the first time in his career. With this win, he became the 18th Grand Slam Champion.

On the following episode of SmackDown, WWE Champion AJ Styles and Shinsuke Nakamura began the show and said that they respected each other. Nakamura then promised to deliver a Kinshasa to Styles at WrestleMania 34 and become WWE Champion. They were interrupted by Rusev, who then had a match with Styles, which ended in a disqualification after Aiden English interfered. Nakamura would save Styles from the 2-on-1 attack by delivering a Kinshasa to both Rusev and English. Nakamura and Rusev had their Fastlane rematch on the March 20 episode, where Nakamura was again victorious. After the match, Rusev and English attacked Nakamura. As Styles was about to save Nakamura, Nakamura recovered and fended off Rusev and English.

Also on the show, Kevin Owens and Sami Zayn blamed each other for not winning the WWE Championship, as well as Commissioner Shane McMahon. Later, Shane recapped his feud with both Owens and Zayn over the past several months. He said his actions towards the two were not that of a SmackDown Commissioner. He then announced that he would be taking an indefinite leave of absence from SmackDown. Before he left, however, he scheduled Owens and Zayn to face each other at WrestleMania 34. Owens and Zayn then teamed up and brutally attacked Shane. The following week, General Manager Daniel Bryan, who was forced to retire in 2016, revealed that he was medically cleared to compete again. Later, he fired Owens and Zayn for their attack on Shane, and the two gave Bryan a beat down. Bryan then scheduled a tag team match pitting himself and Shane against Owens and Zayn at WrestleMania 34, where if Owens and Zayn were to win, they would be rehired.

Asuka appeared on the March 12 episode of Raw to explain why she had chosen to challenge Charlotte Flair for the SmackDown Women's Championship instead of Raw Women's Champion Alexa Bliss. Bliss and Mickie James interrupted, stating that Asuka was afraid to challenge Bliss, however, Asuka said she chose Flair because she wanted to challenge the best women's champion in WWE and said that was Flair, not Bliss. Asuka then made her debut appearance on SmackDown the next night where she confronted Flair, who vowed to end Asuka's undefeated streak at WrestleMania 34. Asuka further explained that she wanted a challenge, and that was another reason why she chose to challenge Flair instead of Bliss.

As Kofi Kingston, Xavier Woods, and Jey Uso were still ailing from injuries sustained by The Bludgeon Brothers (Harper and Rowan) attack at Fastlane during the SmackDown Tag Team Championship match, Big E and Jimmy Uso teamed up to exact revenge. The Bludgeon Brothers, however, defeated Big E and Jimmy. This led to a triple threat tag team match for the titles at WrestleMania 34.

Bobby Roode invoked his rematch clause against Randy Orton for the United States Championship at WrestleMania 34. Jinder Mahal interrupted and defeated Roode in a match, after which, Orton attacked Mahal with an RKO. The following week, Orton was scheduled to defend his title against Roode and Mahal at WrestleMania. Rusev was then added to the championship match for pinning Orton in a tag team match on the March 27 episode.

John Cena went back to Raw following Fastlane. He said that he would not be able to contribute to WrestleMania 34 as a performer, but instead as a fan. However, he decided that although he was told it was impossible, he put out another challenge to The Undertaker for WrestleMania.

The 2018 Fastlane was the final brand-exclusive PPV and livestreaming event for the main roster under the second brand split as following WrestleMania 34 the following month, WWE discontinued these types of events with further events featuring all main roster brands. This in turn made it the final SmackDown-exclusive PPV and livestreaming event, with a minor exception of a livestreaming event titled Smackville in July 2019. This event was originally booked as a non-televised SmackDown-exclusive house show, but in WWE's effort to increase content on the WWE Network, portions of it were livestreamed exclusively as a one-hour special.

== Results ==
No.	Results	Stipulations	Times
1^{P}	Breezango (Fandango and Tyler Breeze) and Tye Dillinger defeated Mojo Rawley, Chad Gable, and Shelton Benjamin by pinfall	Six-man tag team match	7:25
2	Shinsuke Nakamura defeated Rusev (with Aiden English) by pinfall	Singles match	14:50
3	Randy Orton defeated Bobby Roode (c) by pinfall	Singles match for the WWE United States Championship	19:15
4	Natalya and Carmella defeated Becky Lynch and Naomi by pinfall	Tag team match	8:55
5	The Usos (Jey Uso and Jimmy Uso) (c) vs. The New Day (Kofi Kingston and Xavier Woods) (with Big E) ended in a no contest	Tag team match for the WWE SmackDown Tag Team Championship	9:00
6	Charlotte Flair (c) defeated Ruby Riott by submission	Singles match for the WWE SmackDown Women's Championship	13:45
7	AJ Styles (c) defeated Baron Corbin, Dolph Ziggler, John Cena, Kevin Owens, and Sami Zayn by pinfall	Six-Pack Challenge for the WWE Championship	21:55
(c) / – the champion(s) heading into the match; P / – the match was broadcast on the pre-show
