= Fastlane (2016) =

WWE pay-per-view and livestreaming event

- Promotional poster featuring Dean Ambrose, Roman Reigns, Brock Lesnar, and Eva Marie
- Promotion: WWE
- Date: February 21, 2016
- City: Cleveland, Ohio
- Venue: Quicken Loans Arena
- Attendance: 14,446
- Buy rate: 43,000 (excluding WWE Network views)

WWE event chronology
← Previous; Royal Rumble	Next → Roadblock

Fastlane chronology
← Previous; 2015	Next → 2017

The 2016 Fastlane was a professional wrestling pay-per-view (PPV) and livestreaming event produced by WWE. It was the second annual Fastlane and took place on February 21, 2016, at Quicken Loans Arena in Cleveland, Ohio. This was the last Fastlane to be held before the reintroduction of the brand extension in July. The event's name was a reference to its position on the "Road to WrestleMania".

Eight matches were contested at the event, including one on the Kickoff pre-show. In the main event, Roman Reigns defeated Brock Lesnar and Dean Ambrose in a triple threat match to become the #1 contender for the WWE World Heavyweight Championship to face Triple H at WrestleMania 32. In other prominent matches, AJ Styles defeated Chris Jericho, and Charlotte defeated Brie Bella to retain the WWE Divas Championship in the title's final defense at a Fastlane event.

== Production ==
=== Background ===
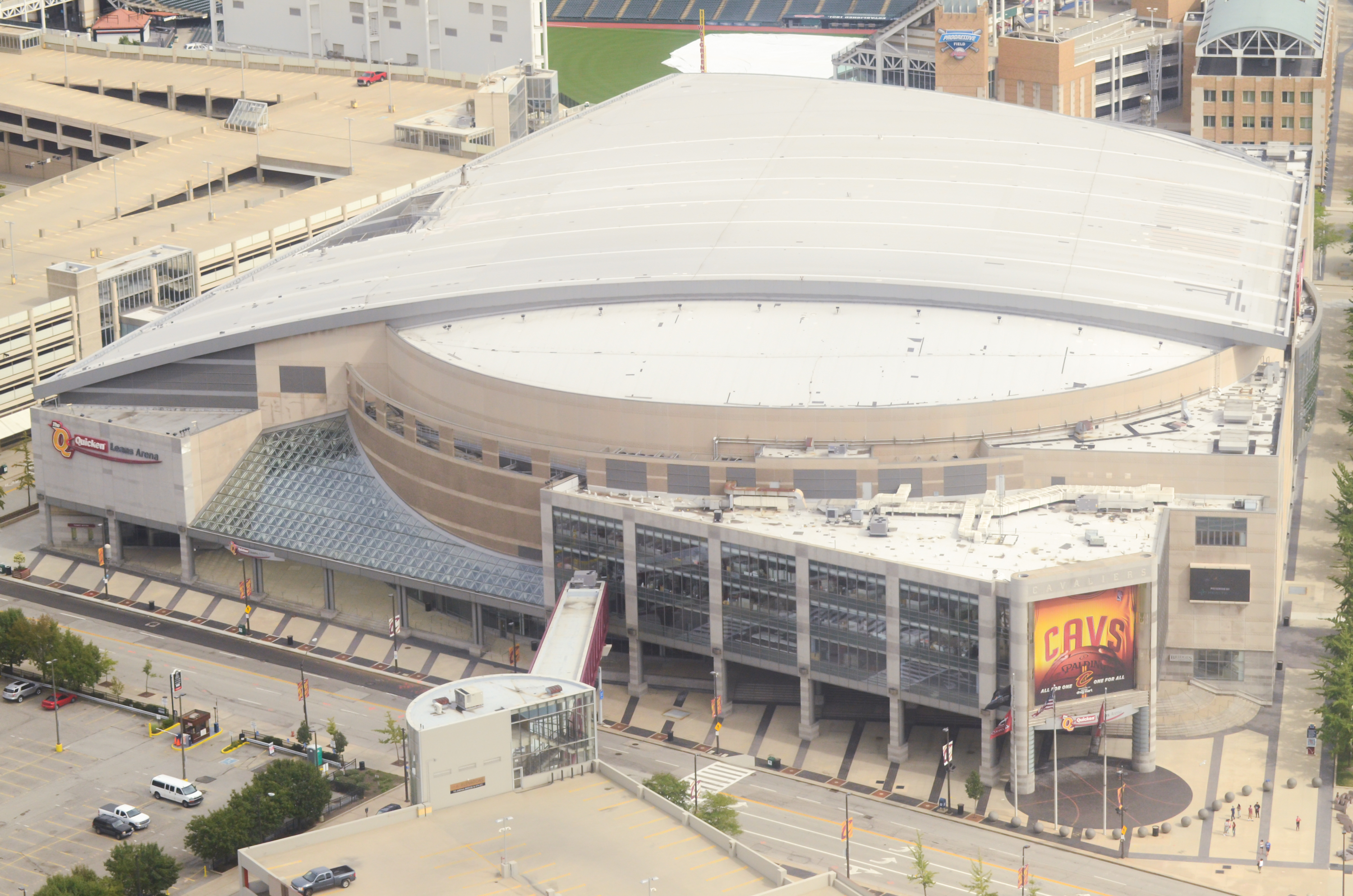
The second annual Fastlane was held at Quicken Loans Arena in Cleveland, Ohio.

In February 2015, WWE held a professional wrestling event titled Fastlane, which aired via pay-per-view (PPV) and via livestreaming on the WWE Network. The name of the event was chosen as a reference to its position on the "Road to WrestleMania", being held in the two-month period between the Royal Rumble and WWE's flagship event. On September 26, 2015, a second Fastlane event was scheduled for February 21, 2016, at Quicken Loans Arena in Cleveland, Ohio, thus establishing Fastlane as an annual event for the promotion.

=== Storylines ===
The event comprised eight matches, including one of the Kickoff pre-show, that resulted from scripted storylines. Results were predetermined by WWE's writers, while storylines were produced on WWE's weekly television programs, Raw and SmackDown.

At the Royal Rumble, Triple H won the Royal Rumble match by eliminating WWE World Heavyweight Champion Roman Reigns and lastly Dean Ambrose to win the championship. On the following night on Raw, Stephanie McMahon scheduled a triple threat match featuring the rumble runner-up Ambrose, the previous champion Reigns, and Brock Lesnar at the event, with the winner facing Triple H at WrestleMania 32 for the title.

At the Royal Rumble, Kalisto defeated Alberto Del Rio to win the WWE United States Championship. Del Rio then invoked his rematch clause to face Kalisto for the title at the event. The match was later moved to the Fastlane Kickoff pre-show, with Del Rio challenging Kalisto to a two-out-of-three falls match.

On the February 1 episode of Raw, Brie Bella defeated WWE Divas Champion Charlotte in a non-title match, earning a title match against Charlotte at the event.

On the same episode of Raw, Sasha Banks split from Team B.A.D., thus turning face, causing her former teammates Naomi and Tamina to attack Banks during her match against Becky Lynch. Lynch assisted Banks, setting up a tag team match between the two teams for the event.

Kevin Owens won his second Intercontinental Championship on the February 15 episode of Raw in a fatal five-way match also involving Tyler Breeze, Dolph Ziggler, Stardust and then-champion Dean Ambrose. Ziggler, who had defeated Owens in the previous two weeks on Raw, then challenged Owens to an Intercontinental Championship match at the event, with the match being confirmed for the event despite Owens refusing the challenge.

On the February 15 episode of Raw, an installment of The Cutting Edge Peep Show, hosted by Edge and Christian, was announced for the event, with WWE Tag Team Champions The New Day (Kofi Kingston, Big E, and Xavier Woods) as their special guests.

The Wyatt Family (Bray Wyatt, Luke Harper, Braun Strowman, and Erick Rowan) began feuding with Big Show, Kane, and Ryback, with The Wyatt Family attacking the trio, after Wyatt's victory over Kane on the January 25 episode of Raw, Big Show's victory over Rowan on the February 1 episode of Raw and Wyatt's victory over Ryback a week later. On the February 15 episode of Raw, Big Show defeated Strowman by disqualification after the Wyatt Family attacked Big Show. During the post-match, Ryback and Kane came out to assist Big Show, setting up a six-man tag team match for the event, with Big Show, Kane and Ryback facing Rowan, Strowman and fellow Wyatt Family member Harper for the event.

AJ Styles made his WWE debut during the Royal Rumble match. On the following night on Raw, Styles defeated Chris Jericho. Jericho then defeated Styles in a rematch on the February 11 episode of SmackDown. On the following episode on Raw, Styles challenged Jericho to a third match at Fastlane, which Jericho accepted on the following episode of SmackDown.

== Event ==
Other on-screen personnel
Role:	Name:
English commentators	Michael Cole (PPV)
English commentators	John "Bradshaw" Layfield (Pre-show + PPV)
English commentators	Byron Saxton (Pre-show + PPV)
English commentators	Mauro Ranallo (Pre-show)
Spanish commentators	Carlos Cabrera
Spanish commentators	Marcelo Rodríguez
Ring announcers	Lilian Garcia
Ring announcers	Eden Stiles
Ring announcers	Tony Chimel
Referees	John Cone
Referees	Dan Engler
Referees	Mike Chioda
Referees	Rod Zapata
Referees	Darrick Moore
Referees	Chad Patton
Backstage interviewer	JoJo
Pre-show panel	Renee Young
Pre-show panel	Corey Graves
Pre-show panel	Booker T
Pre-show panel	Jerry Lawler

=== Pre-show ===
During the Fastlane Kickoff pre-show, Kalisto defended the United States Championship against Alberto Del Rio in a two out of three falls match. Kalisto won the first fall by disqualification after Del Rio attacked him with a chair. Del Rio won the second fall after a Double Foot Stomp on Kalisto, who was hanging on the middle rope. Kalisto pinned Del Rio with a roll-up to win the third fall and retain the title.

=== Preliminary matches ===
The actual pay-per-view opened with Becky Lynch and Sasha Banks facing Team B.A.D. (Naomi and Tamina). The match ended when Banks applied the Banks Statement on Tamina whilst Lynch applied the Dis-arm-her on Naomi, who both submitted simultaneously.

Next, Kevin Owens defended the Intercontinental Championship against Dolph Ziggler. Owens executed a Pop Up Powerbomb on Ziggler to retain the title.

After that, The Wyatt Family (Luke Harper, Erick Rowan, and Braun Strowman) faced Big Show, Kane, and Ryback. Ryback executed Shell Shocked on Harper to win the match for his team.

In the fourth match, Charlotte defended the Divas Championship against Brie Bella. Charlotte forced Brie to submit to the Figure Eight Leglock to retain the title.

In the fifth match, AJ Styles faced Chris Jericho. Jericho applied the Walls of Jericho Styles touched the ropes, forcing Jericho to break the hold. Jericho executed a Codebreaker on Styles but Styles's arm being under the bottom rope voided the pinfall. Styles executed a Styles Clash on Jericho for a near-fall. Styles forced Jericho to submit to the Calf Crusher to win the match.

Edge and Christian hosted the Cutting Edge Peep Show, with WWE Tag Team Champions The New Day (Kofi Kingston, Big E, and Xavier Woods), who first insulted Edge and Christian but then began to insult The League of Nations (Sheamus, King Barrett, Alberto Del Rio, and Rusev). When The League of Nations appeared, The New Day left the ring with Edge and Christian.

In an unannounced penultimate match, Curtis Axel (accompanied by Adam Rose, Bo Dallas, and Heath Slater) faced R-Truth. Axel won the match by pinning R-Truth with a roll up.

=== Main event ===
In the main event, Roman Reigns, Dean Ambrose and Brock Lesnar (with Paul Heyman) fought to determine the #1 contender for the WWE World Heavyweight Championship at WrestleMania 32. To start the match, Lesnar performed two German Suplexes on Reigns, before Ambrose got involved. The action spilled at ringside, where Lesnar threw Reigns into the barricade. As Ambrose attempted a Suicide Dive, Lesnar reversed it into an Overhead Belly-to-Belly Suplex. Back to the ring, Lesnar performed two more German Suplexes and an F-5 on Reigns, but Ambrose avoided a pinfall at a two count. Lesnar performed three German Suplexes and attempted an F-5 on Ambrose, but Reigns performed a Spear on Lesnar for a nearfall, saving Ambrose. Reigns performed a Superman Punch on Lesnar, taking him out of the ring. As Reigns attempted a second Superman Punch, Lesnar reversed it into a second F-5 attempt on an announce table, but Ambrose attacked Lesnar with a low-blow, which was followed by a Double Powerbomb from Reigns and Ambrose on Lesnar through the announce table. After brawling themselves, Reigns and Ambrose stopped Lesnar from returning to the match with a second Double Powerbomb through a second announce table. Reigns and Ambrose buried Lesnar under the pieces of the two announce tables. Ambrose performed a Dirty Deeds on Reigns for a nearfall. Lesnar jumped back to the ring and performed a Double German Suplex on Reigns and Ambrose, while the last was on the shoulders of the first. Reigns performed a second Spear on Lesnar and Lesnar performed a Kimura Lock on Reigns, but Ambrose attacked both men with a chair. When Lesnar rolled out of the ring after one more chair shot from Ambrose, Reigns performed a Spear from a high jump on Ambrose for a pinfall. Aftermath, WWE World Heavyweight Champion Triple H came out and stared down Reigns at the ring.

== Reception ==
Like the previous year's event, Fastlane received generally mixed reviews from critics. Aaron Oster of The Baltimore Sun reviewed the pay-per-view as "solid", but noted that the show was "received so poorly" by fans that it led to "#CancelWWENetwork trending on Twitter once again". Regarding the main event, the fan "response has been instantly negative" despite a result "many expected". While the "match itself was good for the most part", the finish was questioned by Oster: "Why was Reigns able to jump right up after he got hit several times with a steel chair?" Styles-Jericho was "great" but Oster also questioned "why Chris Jericho was kicking out of the Styles Clash so early into Styles' WWE career." For the women's title match, "Brie looked OK" but was not on the level of Charlotte's previous opponents, Paige and Becky Lynch. Both the women's tag match and Owens-Ziggler were "good", with praise for Owens' "short-arm pop-up powerbomb". Meanwhile, Del Rio's disqualification was a "great piece of psychology that added to the match" for the U.S. title. Lastly, the Wyatt's loss was a "mistake" because "if they can't beat this thrown-together group, who can they beat?"

Jason Powell of Pro Wrestling Dot Net "felt letdown by the overall show until the main event". This was in spite of "some good matches", because the entire Fastlane event failed to leave Powell "anxious to see WrestleMania", with "the Hunter vs. Reigns match just doesn't feel main event worth". For the matches, Powell was high on the main event ("very good" and without "a dull moment"), Jericho-Styles ("good drama down the stretch... Jericho did a really nice job of acting like he was in agony as he sold the Calf Crusher") and the Divas Championship bout ("an entertaining match with Brie using a lot of her husband's moves"). Additionally, the Wyatts losing was "very surprising". For the negatives, Powell suffered network streaming issues for the women's tag match and the Intercontinental title match, Edge and Christian's segment "was terrible", and for Axel-Truth, Powell said, "I watched a pay-per-view and a Superstars match broke out".

James Caldwell of Pro Wrestling Torch reviewed the event, with three matches being rated 3.5 out of 5 stars: the main event, Jericho-Styles and Owens-Ziggler. The main event match was described as "WWE main event-style roller-coasting with ups-and-downs and twists and turns playing off the TV, but it was inevitable Reigns was winning, taking some of the steam out of the match". Caldwell criticized the "tone-deaf", "Super Cena booking" of Reigns as WWE failing to change the "presentation for a non-main-eventer masquerading in a main event role". Styles-Jericho had "few slip-ups on big spots", but a "very good, clear story" and "a very strong finish". Owens-Ziggler and Brie-Charlotte (2 stars) were both described as bouts where "the audience didn't really buy the babyface challenger having a shot to win". Del Rio-Kalisto was rated 3 stars and the women's tag match 2.5 stars. The six-man tag match was rated 2.25 stars, with Caldwell questioning if the Wyatts needed to resort to "another promo/sneak-attack trying to save face after another big loss". Caldwell was also negative on Edge and Christian's segment as "none of this made any sense from a character alignment perspective", as well as the Axel-Truth match for even happening, writing that "the PPV has gone off the rails, like a third hour of Raw".

Dave Scherer of PWInsider praised the main event match as "really, really good", but criticized the match result as Vince McMahon ignoring "the voice of the people... especially when the crowd made it really clear that of the two, they wanted Dean" over Roman Reigns. Scherer was most positive regarding the Styles-Jericho match, describing it as "freaking awesome. AJ did what AJ does and WWE let him do it... And kudos to Jericho for being a veteran stud here". For the women's matches, Scherer wrote that the title match "could have been the best match I have ever seen Brie have", while the tag bout was "good, solid". The Intercontinental title match was "great", as was Kevin Owens' performance in it. The United States title match was "solid", but Scherer criticized "how they are booking ADR" as "wasting him". Lastly, Scherer dismissed Edge and Christian's segment as an "in show ad".

== Aftermath ==
On the following night's episode of Raw, Brock Lesnar attacked Dean Ambrose in the Joe Louis Arena parking lot in Detroit for costing him the match at Fastlane. The attack sent Ambrose to a hospital. Later on Raw, Lesnar and Paul Heyman issued a challenge to anyone in the locker room to face Lesnar at WrestleMania. The still-injured Ambrose drove an ambulance back into the arena to challenge Lesnar in a No Holds Barred Street Fight at WrestleMania 32. Lesnar attacked Ambrose with an F-5 and accepted the challenge.

Ryback, Big Show, and Kane faced The Wyatt Family (Luke Harper, Erick Rowan, and Bray Wyatt) in a rematch on the following night on Raw. During the match, Ryback walked out of the match, allowing The Wyatt Family to take advantage and win the match when Wyatt pinned Kane. Ryback later explained that he was sick of being in tag team matches.

On the following night's episode of Raw, Chris Jericho called out AJ Styles and told him he finally earned his respect. The Social Outcasts then interrupted them, leading to Jericho and Styles teaming up and defeating Heath Slater and Curtis Axel of The Social Outcasts. After defeating The New Day in two consecutive matches, Jericho and Styles faced The New Day in a title match on the March 7 episode of Raw, in which Jericho was pinned by Big E. After the match, Jericho attacked Styles with three Codebreakers, turning heel in the process. Jericho stated that he was tired of the fans chanting for Styles and not him. Styles then challenged Jericho to a match at WrestleMania 32, but Jericho refused, stating he would rather sit with the crowd at WrestleMania rather than face him. On the March 28 episode of Raw, Styles distracted Jericho, causing him to lose his match. Afterwards, Jericho accepted the challenge.

Over the next few weeks, WWE Tag Team Champions The New Day (Kofi Kingston, Big E, and Xavier Woods) continued to mock The League of Nations (Sheamus, Alberto Del Rio, King Barrett, and Rusev) in backstage segments. At Roadblock, The New Day (Big E and Kingston) retained the WWE Tag Team Championship against Sheamus and Barrett. After another title defense the following night on Raw, The League of Nations attacked The New Day, turning the latter into faces in the process, leading to a six-man tag team match pitting Sheamus, Del Rio, and Barrett against The New Day at WrestleMania 32.

After Sasha Banks defeated Naomi the following night on Raw, Banks and Becky Lynch faced each other on the February 29 episode of Raw to determine who would face Charlotte for the Divas Championship at WrestleMania 32. The match which ended in a draw after both women's shoulders were pinned. A rematch on the March 3 episode of SmackDown ended in a double disqualification after Charlotte attacked both women. After Charlotte insisted that no one deserves a title match, she was scheduled to defend her championship against both women in a triple threat match at WrestleMania. However, during the WrestleMania 32 pre-show, the Divas Championship was retired and replaced by a new WWE Women's Championship, with the triple threat match instead determining the inaugural holder of the new title.

The 2016 Fastlane was the final Fastlane to occur before the reintroduction of the brand extension in July, where WWE again divided its main roster between the Raw and SmackDown brands where wrestlers were exclusively assigned to perform. The 2017 event was in turn made a Raw-exclusive show.

== Results ==
No.	Results	Stipulations	Times
1^{P}	Kalisto (c) defeated Alberto Del Rio 2–1	Two out of three falls match for the WWE United States Championship	15:02
2	Becky Lynch and Sasha Banks defeated Team B.A.D. (Naomi and Tamina) by submission	Tag team match	09:50
3	Kevin Owens (c) defeated Dolph Ziggler by pinfall	Singles match for the WWE Intercontinental Championship	15:10
4	Big Show, Kane, and Ryback defeated The Wyatt Family (Braun Strowman, Erick Rowan and Luke Harper) (with Bray Wyatt) by pinfall	Six-man tag team match	10:37
5	Charlotte (c) (with Ric Flair) defeated Brie Bella by submission	Singles match for the WWE Divas Championship	12:30
6	AJ Styles defeated Chris Jericho by submission	Singles match	16:25
7	Curtis Axel (with Adam Rose, Bo Dallas, and Heath Slater) defeated R-Truth by pinfall	Singles match	02:23
8	Roman Reigns defeated Dean Ambrose and Brock Lesnar (with Paul Heyman) by pinfall	Triple threat match to determine the #1 contender for the WWE World Heavyweight Championship at WrestleMania 32	16:49
(c) / – the champion(s) heading into the match; P / – the match was broadcast on the pre-show
