= Fastlane (2023) =

WWE premium live event

- Promotional poster featuring John Cena
- Promotion: WWE
- Brand(s): Raw; SmackDown
- Date: October 7, 2023
- City: Indianapolis, Indiana
- Venue: Gainbridge Fieldhouse
- Attendance: 14,529

WWE event chronology
← Previous; NXT No Mercy	Next → Crown Jewel

Fastlane chronology
← Previous; 2021	Next → Final

The 2023 Fastlane was a professional wrestling premium live event (PLE) produced by WWE, held for wrestlers from the promotion's main roster brands, Raw and SmackDown. It was the seventh and final Fastlane and took place on Saturday, October 7, 2023, at the Gainbridge Fieldhouse in Indianapolis, Indiana. The name of the event originally referred to its position on the "Road to WrestleMania"; however, this was dropped for 2023 due to the event taking place six months after WrestleMania 39.

Five matches were contested at the event. In the main event, which was the main match from Raw, Seth "Freakin" Rollins defeated Shinsuke Nakamura in a Last Man Standing match to retain the World Heavyweight Championship. In another prominent match, which was SmackDown's main match, John Cena and LA Knight defeated The Bloodline (Jimmy Uso and Solo Sikoa). The event's pre-show also marked the first appearance of Jade Cargill in WWE, who previously performed in All Elite Wrestling, while the main card featured the full-time return of Carlito to WWE since May 2010, and he became a member of the SmackDown brand in the process during the event.

This was the first Fastlane since 2021 and it was the final as no further events have been held. It was also the first to take place on a Saturday and in October. This was also WWE's first PLE held in Indianapolis since Clash of Champions in September 2016, which was at the same arena when it was known as Bankers Life Fieldhouse (renamed in 2021). The event also replaced Extreme Rules, which was held in October the previous year and was discontinued in 2023. This was also WWE's first main roster PLE in which the company was not owned and controlled by the McMahon family after WWE was sold to Endeavor. The sale was finalized on September 12, 2023, with WWE and Ultimate Fighting Championship merging to become divisions of a new entity called TKO Group Holdings, subsequently marking WWE's first main roster PLE under TKO.

It was also the first Fastlane to be branded as a "premium live event", a term the company introduced at the start of 2022 to refer to its events airing on traditional pay-per-view and via WWE's livestreaming platforms. This would also be the first and only Fastlane to livestream on Disney+ Hotstar in Indonesia, Disney+ in the Philippines, and Binge in Australia, and it was WWE's first PLE to livestream on Abema in Japan.

== Production ==
=== Background ===
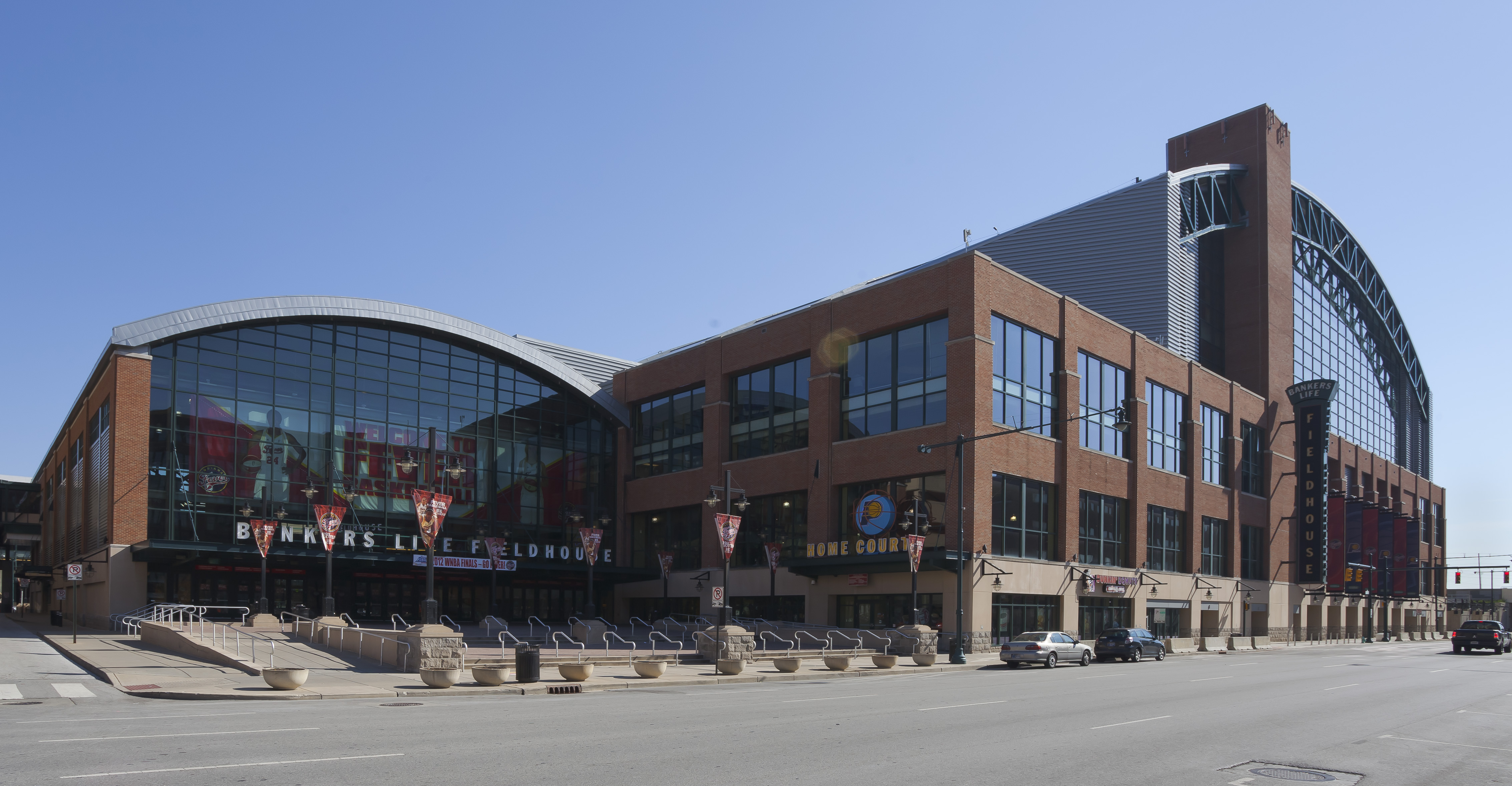
The seventh and final Fastlane was held at the Gainbridge Fieldhouse in Indianapolis, Indiana (pictured in 2012 under its previous name of Bankers Life Fieldhouse).

Fastlane was a professional wrestling premium live event (PLE) first produced by WWE in 2015. It was held annually until 2019 when it was discontinued a first time but was reinstated in 2021, but was again discontinued. On June 20, 2023, however, WWE announced the revival of the event, with the seventh Fastlane scheduled for Saturday, October 7, 2023, at the Gainbridge Fieldhouse in Indianapolis, Indiana, and featured wrestlers from the Raw and SmackDown brand divisions. This marked the first Fastlane held in October and on a Saturday. Tickets went on sale on July 14 via Ticketmaster. This was also the first Fastlane to be branded as a "premium live event", a term the company introduced on January 1, 2022, to refer to its events that are available on pay-per-view (PPV) and via livestreaming. It was also WWE's first PLE held in Indianapolis since Clash of Champions in September 2016, which was at the same arena when it was formerly known as Bankers Life Fieldhouse (renamed in 2021).

The name of the event was originally a reference to its position on the "Road to WrestleMania", as Fastlane was held in the two-month period between the Royal Rumble and WWE's flagship event. With Fastlane's revival for 2023, however, this theme was dropped due to the event taking place six months after WrestleMania 39. The 2023 event also replaced Extreme Rules, which had been held in October the previous year and was discontinued in 2023 after WWE discontinued some of its gimmick events.

From January 2023, there had been speculation that WWE had been placed up for sale. Hours before WrestleMania 39 Night 2 began, CNBC reported via multiple sources that a deal between WWE and Endeavor, the parent company of Ultimate Fighting Championship (UFC) via Zuffa, was imminent. The deal involved a merger of WWE with the UFC into a new publicly traded company, with Endeavor holding a 51% stake. The sale was confirmed the next day on April 3 and was finalized on September 12, with WWE merging with the UFC to become divisions of TKO Group Holdings. The 2023 Fastlane was in turn the first main roster PLE held in which WWE was not owned and controlled by the McMahon family, and subsequently the first main roster PLE under TKO.

=== Broadcast outlets ===
The PLE was available through traditional PPV outlets worldwide. It was also available to livestream on Peacock in the United States, SonyLIV in India, Disney+ Hotstar in Indonesia, Disney+ in the Philippines, Binge in Australia, Abema in Japan, and the WWE Network everywhere else. It was the first Fastlane to livestream on Disney+ Hotstar, Disney+, and Binge, after those countries' respective versions of the WWE Network merged under those services in January 2022, November 2022, and January 2023, respectively, and it was WWE's first PLE to livestream on Abema in Japan, after Abema and WWE inked a deal to make Abema the exclusive home for WWE Network in Japan on September 28, 2023, which began with the October 2 episode of Monday Night Raw (Tuesday, October 3 in Japan).

This was also the first Fastlane in which Peacock was the only livestreaming option in the United States, as the 2021 event was available on both Peacock and the WWE Network in the US as it was held in the transitional period before the American version of the WWE Network shutdown on April 4 that year.

=== Storylines ===
The event included five matches that resulted from scripted storylines. Results were predetermined by WWE's writers on the Raw and SmackDown brands, while storylines were produced on WWE's weekly television shows, Monday Night Raw and Friday Night SmackDown.

At Payback, Seth "Freakin" Rollins defeated Shinsuke Nakamura to retain the World Heavyweight Championship. Following the match, Nakamura viciously attacked Rollins, requiring medical personnel to assist Rollins out of the arena. On the following episode of Raw, as he was unhappy with the post-match incident, Rollins challenged Nakamura to a title rematch later that night; however, Nakamura declined, wanting to do it on his own terms. A brawl then ensued with Nakamura getting the upper hand. The fighting would continue over the next couple of weeks until the September 18 episode when a frustrated Rollins stated that Nakamura could choose the place, time, and stipulation for their championship rematch. The following week, Nakamura accepted Rollins's proposal, choosing a Last Man Standing match at Fastlane.

On the September 1 episode of SmackDown, John Cena made his return to WWE, which was his first appearance since Money in the Bank in July. He was interrupted by Jimmy Uso, who claimed the fans wanted to see him instead. Cena responded that Jimmy should have quit WWE instead of Jey Uso and then performed an Attitude Adjustment on Jimmy. Two weeks later, Cena was a guest on Grayson Waller's talkshow "The Grayson Waller Effect", only for Jimmy to interrupt again. Solo Sikoa also came out and feigned attacking Jimmy due to the latter's recent internal issues with The Bloodline, however, Sikoa and Jimmy instead attacked Cena, who was saved by AJ Styles. The following week, Cena and Styles challenged Jimmy and Sikoa to a tag team match for that night; however, after WWE official Adam Pearce conferred with Bloodline manager Paul Heyman, the match was scheduled for Fastlane. A contract signing for the match was set up to happen later that night; however, Jimmy and Sikoa brutally attacked Styles backstage. Styles was subsequently taken to a hospital, leaving Cena to confront The Bloodline alone and they laid out Cena in the ring. On September 25, WWE announced that Cena would be facing Jimmy and Sikoa in a handicap match at Fastlane. On that Friday's SmackDown, however, after Cena received another beatdown from The Bloodline, LA Knight made the save and signed the contract to be Cena's partner, which was made official—Cena had previously praised Knight at Payback after serving as the special guest referee for Knight's match at that event.

At SummerSlam, Iyo Sky cashed in her Money in the Bank contract and won the WWE Women's Championship right after Asuka had lost the title in the prior match. Following this, Damage CTRL (Bayley, Dakota Kai, and Sky) began feuding with Asuka, as well as Charlotte Flair, who sided with Asuka. On the September 29 episode of SmackDown, Flair stated that after defeating Bayley that night, she would challenge Sky for the title at Fastlane. After Flair defeated Bayley, Damage CTRL surrounded the ring in an attempt to attack Flair, however, Asuka came out to assist Flair. Bayley subsequently accepted the challenge on behalf of Sky for her to defend the WWE Women's Championship against Flair and Asuka in a triple threat match at Fastlane, much to the dismay of Sky.

On the September 22 episode of SmackDown, Latino World Order (LWO) members Rey Mysterio and Santos Escobar defeated Bobby Lashley's accomplices The Street Profits (Angelo Dawkins and Montez Ford). Following the match, Lashley was disappointed in The Street Profits's performance and told them that if they could not win, he would find others who could. The following week, after a United States Championship match between defending champion Mysterio and Escobar, The Street Profits came out and attacked the two, which pleased Lashley. Fellow LWO members Joaquin Wilde and Cruz Del Toro came out to even the odds only for The Street Profits to overpower them. Later, Mysterio issued a challenge, pitting the LWO (Mysterio, Escobar, and either Wilde or Toro) against Lashley and The Street Profits in a six-man tag team match at Fastlane. The next day on SmackDown LowDown, Lashley accepted the challenge. On the next week's SmackDown, however, The Street Profits took out both Wilde and Toro, and it was later revealed that neither would be cleared for Fastlane. LWO's Zelina Vega worried about how they could compete being outnumbered, but Mysterio said he would make a phone call.

Prior to Payback, Jey Uso "quit" WWE after a falling out with The Bloodline on SmackDown. At Payback, Cody Rhodes revealed that he pulled some strings and Jey was reinstated as a member of the Raw roster. Despite opposition from some of the other Raw roster members due to Jey's past in The Bloodline, Rhodes asserted that Jey deserved a second chance. The Judgment Day (Finn Bálor, Damian Priest, "Dirty" Dominik Mysterio, and Rhea Ripley), along with JD McDonagh, then attempted to convince Jey to join their stable, however, Jey declined. On the September 18 episode of Raw, Judgment Day attacked Jey after his match, and Jey was saved by Rhodes. Two weeks later, it was announced that Bálor and Priest would defend the Undisputed WWE Tag Team Championship against Rhodes and Jey at Fastlane.

== Event ==
Other on-screen personnel
Role:	Name:
English commentators	Michael Cole
English commentators	Corey Graves
English commentators	Pat McAfee (Cena & LA Knight vs. The Bloodline)
Spanish commentators	Marcelo Rodriguez
Spanish commentators	Jerry Soto
Ring announcer	Mike Rome
Referees	Jason Ayers
Referees	Jessika Carr
Referees	Dan Engler
Referees	Chad Patton
Interviewers	Byron Saxton
Interviewers	Cathy Kelley
Pre-show panel	Kayla Braxton
Pre-show panel	Jackie Redmond
Pre-show panel	Peter Rosenberg
Pre-show panel	Booker T
Pre-show panel	Wade Barrett

=== Pre-show ===
During the Fastlane Kickoff pre-show, former All Elite Wrestling wrestler and recent signee Jade Cargill made her first WWE appearance, being shown arriving at the arena and greeted by WWE executive Paul "Triple H" Levesque.

=== Preliminary matches ===
The PLE opened with The Judgment Day (Finn Bálor and Damian Priest) defending the Undisputed WWE Tag Team Championship against Cody Rhodes and Jey Uso. Despite interference from Rhea Ripley, "Dirty" Dominik Mysterio, and JD McDonagh, Rhodes and Jey defeated The Judgment Day to win the titles when Rhodes pinned Balor after a Cross Rhodes following a 1-D Cutter with Jey on Balor.

Next, the LWO (Rey Mysterio and Santos Escobar, accompanied by Zelina Vega) and a mystery partner faced Bobby Lashley and The Street Profits (Angelo Dawkins and Montez Ford) in a six-man tag team match. Late in the match, Carlito, in his first appearance since Backlash in May, was revealed as LWO's mystery partner. Carlito moved out of the way when Ford went for an Enzuigiri, he then performed the Backstabber on Ford for the pin. After the match, Carlito would join the SmackDown brand.

After that, Iyo Sky defended the WWE Women's Championship against Asuka and Charlotte Flair in a triple threat match. Mid-match, Bayley came out to assist Sky. In the end, Flair had Asuka in the Figure Eight Leglock submission, but Bayley distracted the referee, who did not see Asuka tap out. Sky then performed an Over The Moonsault on Flair to break up the submission and pinned her to retain the title.

The penultimate match saw John Cena and LA Knight facing The Bloodline (Jimmy Uso and Solo Sikoa, accompanied by Paul Heyman). In the end, Cena and Knight won the match when Knight pinned Jimmy after performing the Blunt Force Trauma.

=== Main event ===
In the main event, Seth "Freakin" Rollins defended the World Heavyweight Championship against Shinsuke Nakamura in a Last Man Standing match. In the end, Rollins performed a Falcon Arrow on Nakamura from an elevated platform through a table of equipment. Nakamura was unable to make it to his feet before the 10 count, thus Rollins retained the title.

== Reception ==
Dave Meltzer, writing for the Wrestling Observer Newsletter, gave Fastlane mixed-to-positive scores. He awarded the Undisputed WWE Tag Team Championship match four and a quarter stars, the six-man tag team match 2 and three quarters stars, the Triple Threat match for the WWE Women's Championship and the Cena-Knight/Bloodline tag team match three and a half stars, and the main event four and a half stars, the highest score of the evening.

== Aftermath ==
This would be the final Fastlane as no further events have been held.

=== Raw ===
On the following Raw, it was announced that new Undisputed WWE Tag Team Champions Cody Rhodes and Jey Uso would defend the titles against The Judgment Day (Finn Bálor and Damian Priest) in a rematch the following week. Judgment Day regained the titles after interference from Jimmy Uso. The following week, as Bálor and Priest were celebrating winning back the championships, Rhodes interrupted. After Priest mocked and called Rhodes a failure, Rhodes challenged Priest to a match that night, but Priest denied since he already had a match scheduled against Uso. Priest in turn challenged Rhodes to a match at Crown Jewel, which Rhodes accepted.

=== SmackDown ===
John Cena opened the following episode of SmackDown, however, he was quickly interrupted by The Bloodline (Solo Sikoa and Paul Heyman) with a returning Roman Reigns, who had been on vacation since shortly after SummerSlam. After Reigns taunted Cena, Cena stated that there was someone worthy who should challenge Reigns for his Undisputed WWE Universal Championship. LA Knight then came out and berated Reigns only for fellow Bloodline member, Jimmy Uso, to attack Knight from behind. After clearing the ring, Knight challenged Sikoa to a match that night where he defeated Sikoa. Following the match, Reigns performed a Spear on Knight and taunted him with his championship belt. It was then announced that Reigns would defend the Undisputed WWE Universal Championship against Knight at Crown Jewel. On SmackDown that night, after realizing he had not won a televised singles match since April 2018 and teasing retirement, Cena called out anyone to face him, which prompted Sikoa to come out and a brawl ensued. This led to a match between Cena and Sikoa for Crown Jewel.

Also on SmackDown, new SmackDown General Manager Nick Aldis noted that due to Bayley distracting the referee, it ultimately cost Charlotte Flair the WWE Women's Championship at Fastlane as Flair had in fact submitted Asuka. Aldis in turn scheduled Iyo Sky to defend the championship against Flair in a singles match the following week. Sky again retained thanks to more assistance and distractions from her Damage CTRL stablemates, Bayley and Dakota Kai.

As Carlito was interviewed backstage on the following SmackDown, he was interrupted by Bobby Lashley. Carlito then challenged him to a match for that night, however, Lashley's stablemates, The Street Profits (Angelo Dawkins and Montez Ford), attacked Carlito from behind. Later, fellow LWO member Santos Escobar requested and was granted a match against Ford for the following week, where Ford won.

== Results ==
No.	Results	Stipulations	Times
1	Cody Rhodes and Jey Uso defeated The Judgment Day (Finn Bálor and Damian Priest) (c) by pinfall	Tag team match for the Undisputed WWE Tag Team Championship (Note: The name "Undisputed WWE Tag Team Championship" referred to both the Raw Tag Team Championship and SmackDown Tag Team Championship being held and defended together, although both titles remained independently active.)	20:40
2	Carlito and Latino World Order (Rey Mysterio and Santos Escobar) (with Zelina Vega) defeated Bobby Lashley and The Street Profits (Angelo Dawkins and Montez Ford) by pinfall	Six-man tag team match	10:00
3	Iyo Sky (c) defeated Asuka and Charlotte Flair by pinfall	Triple threat match for the WWE Women's Championship	17:20
4	John Cena and LA Knight defeated The Bloodline (Jimmy Uso and Solo Sikoa) (with Paul Heyman) by pinfall	Tag team match	17:20
5	Seth "Freakin" Rollins (c) defeated Shinsuke Nakamura as Nakamura was unable to make it to his feet before the referee's count of 10	Last Man Standing match for the World Heavyweight Championship	28:25
(c) / – the champion(s) heading into the match
