= Fastlane (2021) =

WWE pay-per-view and livestreaming event

- Promotional poster featuring Drew McIntyre
- Promotion: WWE
- Brand(s): Raw; SmackDown
- Date: March 21, 2021
- City: St. Petersburg, Florida
- Venue: WWE ThunderDome at Tropicana Field
- Attendance: 0 (behind closed doors) (Note: The event was held without a paying audience due to the COVID-19 pandemic in the United States, though it featured a live crowd of virtual fans via WWE's ThunderDome viewing experience.)

WWE event chronology
← Previous; Elimination Chamber	Next → NXT TakeOver: Stand & Deliver

Fastlane chronology
← Previous; 2019	Next → 2023

The 2021 Fastlane was a professional wrestling pay-per-view (PPV) and livestreaming event produced by WWE, held for wrestlers from the promotion's main roster brands, Raw and SmackDown. It was the sixth Fastlane and due to the COVID-19 pandemic, it took place on March 21, 2021, from the WWE ThunderDome, a bio-secure bubble that at the time was hosted at Tropicana Field in St. Petersburg, Florida. The event's name was a reference to its position on the "Road to WrestleMania".

Eight matches were contested at the event, including one on the Kickoff pre-show. In the main event, Roman Reigns defeated Daniel Bryan to retain SmackDown's Universal Championship with Edge as the special guest enforcer. In other prominent matches, Drew McIntyre defeated Sheamus in a No Holds Barred match, Seth Rollins defeated Shinsuke Nakamura, Big E defeated Apollo Crews to retain SmackDown's Intercontinental Championship, and Alexa Bliss defeated Randy Orton in an intergender match thanks to the return of "The Fiend" Bray Wyatt following a three-month storyline absence.

This was the first Fastlane held since 2019 and the last until 2023. It was also WWE's final PPV and livestreaming event presented from the ThunderDome at Tropicana Field as the bio-secure bubble was relocated to the Yuengling Center in Tampa, Florida following WrestleMania 37 the next month due to the start of the 2021 Tampa Bay Rays season. This was also the first Fastlane to livestream on SonyLIV in India after the shutdown of the Indian version of the WWE Network in February, and it would also be WWE's first PPV and livestreaming event to air on Peacock in the United States, and the last to be available on the American version of the WWE Network, as following a brief transitional period, it was shutdown on April 4.

== Production ==
=== Background ===
Fastlane was a professional wrestling pay-per-view (PPV) and livestreaming event first produced by WWE in 2015. The name of the event was a reference to its position on the "Road to WrestleMania", being held in the two-month period between the Royal Rumble and WWE's flagship event; the first two Fastlane events were held in February before moving to March. The event was held annually until 2020 when Fastlane was removed from the schedule to allow WWE to hold that year's Super ShowDown, but on January 17, 2021, Fastlane was reinstated for that year. The sixth Fastlane was scheduled for March 21, 2021, and featured wrestlers from the Raw and SmackDown brand divisions.

This was the first Fastlane to livestream on SonyLIV in India following the shutdown of the Indian version of the WWE Network in February. Additionally, on January 25, 2021, WWE announced that the WWE Network would become exclusively distributed by Peacock in the United States as part of a new agreement with NBCUniversal, which at the time aired Monday Night Raw and NXT on the USA Network. On March 18, the WWE Network became a premium channel under Peacock, with premium subscribers to the service receiving access to the WWE Network at no additional cost. As a result, Fastlane was the first pay-per-view to air on Peacock. After a brief transitional period, the standalone American version of the WWE Network shut down on April 4, with future events only available via Peacock and traditional PPV, which in turn also made Fastlane the very last in-ring event to air on the standalone version of the American WWE Network before its shutdown. This did not affect other countries at the time, which maintained the separate WWE Network service distributed by WWE.

==== Impact of the COVID-19 pandemic ====
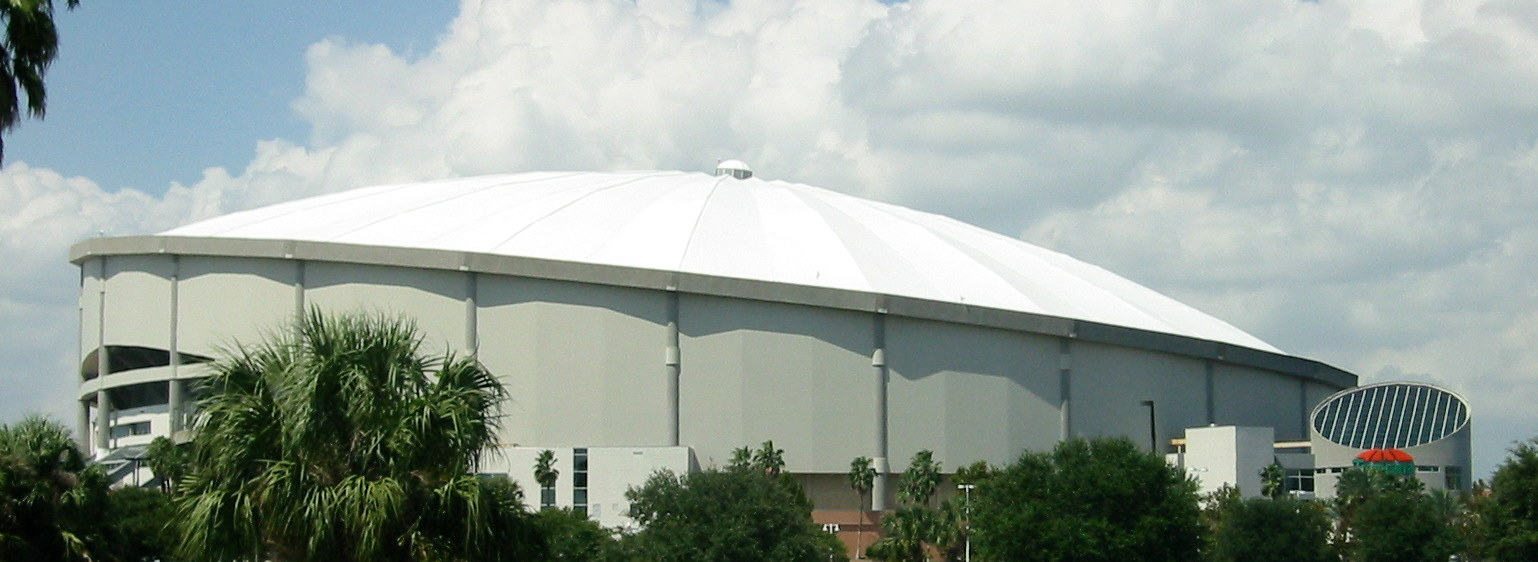
Due to the COVID-19 pandemic, the sixth Fastlane was produced by way of a bio-secure bubble called the WWE ThunderDome, which at the time was hosted at Tropicana Field in St. Petersburg, Florida. This was WWE's final pay-per-view and livestreaming event to be produced from the ThunderDome at Tropicana Field, as the bio-secure bubble was relocated to the Yuengling Center in Tampa in April.

As a result of the COVID-19 pandemic that began affecting the industry in mid-March 2020, WWE had to present the majority of its programming from a behind closed doors set. Initially, Raw and SmackDown's shows were done at the WWE Performance Center in Orlando, Florida. A limited number of Performance Center trainees and friends and family members of the wrestlers were later utilized to serve as the live audience. In late August, these programs were moved to a bio-secure bubble called the WWE ThunderDome. The select live audience was no longer utilized as the bubble allowed fans to attend the events virtually for free and be seen on the nearly 1,000 LED boards within the arena. Additionally, the ThunderDome utilized various special effects to further enhance wrestlers' entrances, and arena audio was mixed with that of the chants from the virtual fans. After being hosted at Orlando's Amway Center, the ThunderDome was relocated to Tropicana Field in St. Petersburg, Florida in December.

Due to the start of the 2021 Tampa Bay Rays season, as Tropicana Field is the home venue of the Tampa Bay Rays, on March 24, 2021, WWE announced that they would relocate the ThunderDome to the Yuengling Center, located on the campus of the University of South Florida in Tampa, beginning with the April 12 episode of Raw. Fastlane was in turn WWE's final PPV and livestreaming event produced from the ThunderDome at Tropicana Field.

=== Storylines ===
The event comprised eight matches, including one on the Kickoff pre-show, that resulted from scripted storylines. Results were predetermined by WWE's writers on the Raw and SmackDown brands, while storylines were produced on WWE's weekly television shows, Monday Night Raw and Friday Night SmackDown.

At Elimination Chamber, Daniel Bryan won SmackDown's Elimination Chamber match, which earned him an immediate Universal Championship match against Roman Reigns, who quickly defeated Bryan to retain the title. Following the match, men's Royal Rumble winner Edge appeared and performed a Spear on Reigns, indicating his choice to challenge Reigns for the Universal Championship at WrestleMania 37. On the following SmackDown, Reigns, accompanied by his special counsel Paul Heyman and cousin Jey Uso, claimed that Edge ruined his win over Bryan, who interrupted. Bryan mocked Reigns for defending his championship against him right after he had won the Elimination Chamber match, and was confused as to why Reigns wanted to defend the title in the second match of the event instead of in the main event. Bryan then challenged Reigns to another championship match at Fastlane. Jey interjected and stated that Bryan lost and would have to earn another opportunity like everyone else and then challenged Bryan to a match. Backstage, Edge confronted WWE official Adam Pearce and took issue that Bryan may receive a title shot before him, even though he had won the Royal Rumble match that Bryan also competed in. Pearce decided that Bryan would only get a Universal Championship match at Fastlane if he could defeat Jey in their match that night. In the main event, however, Bryan and Jey's match ended in a double countout. A rematch the following week was contested in a Steel Cage match where if Bryan won, he would receive the title match, but if Jey won, Bryan would have to acknowledge Reigns as the Tribal Chief and Head of the Table; Bryan defeated Jey to earn the Universal Championship match against Reigns at Fastlane. After the official contract signing for the match on the March 12 episode, a match between Edge and Jey was scheduled for the following week to determine who would be the special guest enforcer during the championship match, which was won by Edge.

After failing to defeat Big E for the Intercontinental Championship in January, Apollo Crews turned heel and began to embrace his royal Nigerian roots, including speaking with a Nigerian accent. On the February 19 episode of SmackDown, after Crews's loss against Shinsuke Nakamura where Big E was on commentary, Crews attacked Nakamura after the match. Big E aided Nakamura, however, Crews attacked Big E with the steel steps, taking him out of action for a couple of weeks. Big E returned on the March 12 episode and called out Crews, who did not answer. Big E then issued an open challenge for the Intercontinental Championship where he retained the title against Sami Zayn. After the match, Crews blindsided Big E and attacked him with the steel steps once again. Big E was subsequently scheduled to defend the Intercontinental Championship against Crews at Fastlane.

On the February 1 episode of Raw, Sheamus turned on his friend Drew McIntyre, declaring that he was not his friend anymore and wanted the WWE Championship. Later that same night, McIntyre accepted Sheamus's challenge for a one-on-one match. McIntyre was then scheduled to defend the title in Raw's Elimination Chamber match at Elimination Chamber in which Sheamus was also a participant; McIntyre retained the championship but then lost it to The Miz, who cashed in his Money in the Bank contract after McIntyre was attacked by Bobby Lashley. McIntyre returned on the March 1 episode of Raw, where he finally faced Sheamus in their promised one-on-one match that McIntyre won. A rematch the following week was contested as a No Disqualification match; however, it ended by referee stoppage. Another match between the two was scheduled for Fastlane as a No Holds Barred match.

At TLC: Tables, Ladders & Chairs in December 2020, Randy Orton defeated "The Fiend" Bray Wyatt in a Firefly Inferno match. After the match, Orton doused The Fiend's lifeless body in gasoline and set him on fire. Following this incident, Alexa Bliss, who had aligned with The Fiend months earlier, began to haunt Orton on a weekly basis, including causing him to lose multiple matches. On the March 15 episode of Raw, Bliss challenged Orton to an intergender match at Fastlane, and Orton accepted in the hopes of ridding Bliss from his life.

Incensed at being left out of Raw's Elimination Chamber match, Braun Strowman took issue with WWE officials Shane McMahon and Adam Pearce. In an attempt to rectify things, Shane scheduled Strowman to team with Pearce to face The Hurt Business (Cedric Alexander and Shelton Benjamin) for the Raw Tag Team Championship. Strowman had the match won, however, after performing a Running Powerslam on Benjamin, Shane signaled to Pearce to tag in for the pin only for Benjamin to perform a roll up on Pearce to retain the title, which enraged Strowman further. Shane then began to insult Strowman's intelligence. Strowman then challenged Shane to a match on the March 15 episode of Raw. The match, however, never officially started and the two instead brawled with Shane calling Strowman stupid. This led to a match being scheduled between the two at Fastlane.

At Elimination Chamber, Riddle won the United States Championship. On the March 1 episode of Raw, Retribution's Mustafa Ali defeated Riddle in a non-title match. Ali then received a United States Championship match against Riddle on the March 15 episode where Riddle retained. Following the show, Ali posted a video on Twitter challenging Riddle to another title match, which was scheduled for the Fastlane Kickoff pre-show.

At Elimination Chamber, Shayna Baszler and Nia Jax defeated Sasha Banks and Bianca Belair to retain the WWE Women's Tag Team Championship. On March 4, a championship rematch between the two teams was scheduled for Fastlane.

On the March 19 episode of SmackDown, while Seth Rollins was talking about Cesaro being the biggest waste of talent in WWE, Shinsuke Nakamura appeared and laid out Rollins. A match between Rollins and Nakamura was subsequently scheduled for Fastlane.

== Event ==
Other on-screen personnel
Role:	Name:
English commentators	Michael Cole (SmackDown)
English commentators	Corey Graves (SmackDown)
English commentators	Tom Phillips (Raw)
English commentators	Samoa Joe (Raw)
English commentators	Byron Saxton (Raw)
Spanish commentators	Carlos Cabrera
Spanish commentators	Marcelo Rodriguez
Ring announcers	Greg Hamilton (SmackDown)
Ring announcers	Mike Rome (Raw)
Referees	Danilo Anfibio
Referees	Shawn Bennett
Referees	Jessika Carr
Referees	John Cone
Referees	Dan Engler
Referees	Darrick Moore
Referees	Chad Patton
Referees	Rod Zapata
Interviewer	Sarah Schreiber
Pre-show panel	Kayla Braxton
Pre-show panel	Jerry Lawler
Pre-show panel	Peter Rosenberg
Pre-show panel	Booker T

=== Pre-show ===
During the Fastlane Kickoff pre-show, Riddle defended the United States Championship against Mustafa Ali (accompanied by his Retribution stablemates T-Bar, Mace, Slapjack, and Reckoning). In the end, Riddle performed a Bro-Derek on Ali from the top rope to retain the title. Following the match, Ali yelled at Reckoning and Slapjack, causing them to walk out on him, after which, Mace and T-Bar attacked Ali with a double Chokeslam.

=== Preliminary matches ===
The actual event opened with Nia Jax and Shayna Baszler (accompanied by Reginald) defending the WWE Women's Tag Team Championship against SmackDown Women's Champion Sasha Banks and Bianca Belair. In the climax, as Banks applied the Bank Statement on Baszler, Belair attacked Jax to prevent Jax from breaking the submission, however, Jax shoved Belair onto Banks, voiding the submission. As Banks was arguing with Belair, Baszler took advantage and performed a roll-up on a distracted Banks to retain the titles. Following the match, Banks blamed Belair for their loss and slapped Belair before departing backstage.

Following the match, the commentators spoke about the scheduled match between Shane McMahon and Braun Strowman, after which, footage was shown from earlier in the day that Shane injured his leg during his training. After the footage, Shane came out of the trainer's room wielding a crutch and with his knee wrapped up. Elias and Jaxson Ryker then approached Shane about doing a concert at WrestleMania. Shane then stated that he has an idea.

Next, Big E defended the Intercontinental Championship against Apollo Crews. Big E reversed a pin attempt by Crews into his own pin attempt to retain the title. Following the match, Crews attacked Big E.

Backstage for an Old Spice advertisement, Akira Tozawa was in search of 24/7 Champion R-Truth, who was hiding in the Old Spice display. Old Spice representative Joseph Average (portrayed by NXT and WWE Performance Center trainee Erik Bugez) then accidentally pinned R-Truth to win the championship after the shelf of deodorants fell over. R-Truth then performed a roll-up on Average to win back the title for his record 51st 24/7 Championship.

After that, Shane McMahon came out to the ring and introduced Elias (accompanied by Jaxson Ryker). Shane allowed Elias to preview his WrestleMania concert, however, after Elias began playing his guitar, Shane cut him off and announced that Elias would be taking his place in his scheduled match against Braun Strowman, who then made his entrance. Strowman performed a Running Powerslam on Elias to win the match.

In the following match, Seth Rollins faced Shinsuke Nakamura. In the climax, Rollins performed a Black Magic Kick and a Curb Stomp on Nakamura to win the match.

After this, Drew McIntyre faced Sheamus in a No Holds Barred match. McIntyre performed a Future Shock DDT on Sheamus onto a television monitor before performing the Claymore Kick to win the match.

In the penultimate match, Randy Orton faced Alexa Bliss in an intergender match. Before the match started, Orton began to spit up a black liquid. During the match, Bliss used supernatural powers, such as causing a lighting rig to fall which nearly landed on Orton and shooting a fireball at Orton. In the end, "The Fiend" Bray Wyatt—who had not been seen since Orton set him on fire at TLC: Tables, Ladders & Chairs in December 2020—tore through the ring canvas, appearing very grotesque with charred skin. Bliss, who was perched atop the turnbuckle, pushed Orton into The Fiend, who then attacked Orton with a Sister Abigail, allowing Bliss to pin Orton to win the match.

=== Main event ===
In the main event, Roman Reigns (accompanied by Paul Heyman) defended the Universal Championship against Daniel Bryan with Edge as the special guest enforcer. In the climax, Bryan accidentally incapacitated the referee, after which, Reigns performed a Spear on Bryan, which prompted Edge to take over as the official. While Bryan applied the Yes! Lock on Reigns, Jey Uso entered the ring and performed a superkick on Edge and Bryan, after which, Jey retrieved a steel chair. As Jey attempted to attack Bryan, Bryan countered and attacked Jey with the chair. Bryan tried to attack Reigns with the chair, however, Reigns ducked and Bryan accidentally struck Edge. As Bryan then applied the Yes! Lock on Reigns once again, Reigns visibly tapped out, however, there was no referee to notice and in response, an enraged Edge attacked both Bryan and Reigns with the steel chair before departing backstage. A second referee came down and Reigns pinned Bryan to retain the title.

== Aftermath ==
In October 2021, WWE revealed their PPV calendar for 2022 and Fastlane was not included. While there had been a to be announced event for February, this event was later revealed as Elimination Chamber. After a two-year hiatus, Fastlane was reinstated for 2023, but for October, subsequently dropping its "Road to WrestleMania" theme.

=== Raw ===
On the following night's episode of Raw, Randy Orton attempted to summon "The Fiend" Bray Wyatt after what had transpired at Fastlane. Alexa Bliss appeared on the stage holding a jack-in-a-box signaling the return of The Fiend, after which, the lights went out. When they returned, The Fiend was standing in the ring. Orton performed an RKO on The Fiend, after which, Bliss walked to the ring to taunt Orton. The Fiend then rose to his feet and attacked Orton with a Sister Abigail. Bliss then pointed to the WrestleMania sign and a match between The Fiend and Orton was scheduled for WrestleMania 37.

Also on Raw, Shane McMahon, along with Elias and Jaxson Ryker, continued to taunt Braun Strowman, who came out and defeated Elias in a rematch. Shane then attacked Strowman with his crutch, revealing that Shane had feigned his injury. Shane then retreated and Strowman challenged Shane to a match at WrestleMania 37 and Shane accepted. The following week, Strowman chose a Steel Cage match as the stipulation.

=== SmackDown ===
On the March 26 episode of SmackDown, Adam Pearce announced that Roman Reigns would defend the Universal Championship against both Edge and Daniel Bryan in a triple threat match at WrestleMania 37. The following week, Bryan faced Jey Uso in a street fight, where Bryan was victorious. After the match, Bryan rammed Edge into the ring post before applying the Yes! Lock on Reigns to stand tall. On the WrestleMania edition of SmackDown, Reigns, Edge, and Bryan gave their final WrestleMania messages, while Jey Uso won the André the Giant Memorial Battle Royal. At WrestleMania 37, Reigns defeated Edge and Bryan to retain the Universal Championship.

Also on SmackDown, Apollo Crews pinned Big E in a six-man tag team match. A rematch between the two for the Intercontinental Championship was subsequently scheduled for WrestleMania 37, which was later changed to a Nigerian Drum Fight. At the event, Crews defeated Big E to win the title after interference from a large man, later revealed to be Commander Azeez.

Seth Rollins faced and defeated Shinsuke Nakamura in a rematch on the following SmackDown. Afterwards, Rollins was attacked by Cesaro, leading to a match between Rollins and Cesaro at WrestleMania 37, which Cesaro won.

== Results ==
No.	Results	Stipulations	Times
1^{P}	Riddle (c) defeated Mustafa Ali (with Mace, Reckoning, Slapjack, and T-Bar) by pinfall	Singles match for the WWE United States Championship	9:16
2	Nia Jax and Shayna Baszler (c) (with Reginald) defeated Bianca Belair and Sasha Banks by pinfall	Tag team match for the WWE Women's Tag Team Championship	9:45
3	Big E (c) defeated Apollo Crews by pinfall	Singles match for the WWE Intercontinental Championship	5:45
4	Braun Strowman defeated Elias (with Jaxson Ryker) by pinfall	Singles match	3:50
5	Seth Rollins defeated Shinsuke Nakamura by pinfall	Singles match	12:55
6	Drew McIntyre defeated Sheamus by pinfall	No Holds Barred match	19:40
7	Alexa Bliss defeated Randy Orton by pinfall	Intergender match	4:45
8	Roman Reigns (c) (with Paul Heyman) defeated Daniel Bryan by pinfall	Singles match for the WWE Universal Championship; Edge was the special guest enforcer.	30:00
(c) / – the champion(s) heading into the match; P / – the match was broadcast on the pre-show
