= Armed Response =

Armed Response may refer to

- Armed Response (1986 film), an American action film directed by Fred Olen Ray
- Armed Response (2013 film), a film starring Ethan Embry
- Armed Response (2017 film), an American action-horror film directed by John Stockwell
- "Armed Response" (Murder, She Wrote), a 1985 television episode

== See also ==
- Armed response vehicle, a type of police car in the UK
