= Seth Rollins =

American professional wrestler (born 1986)

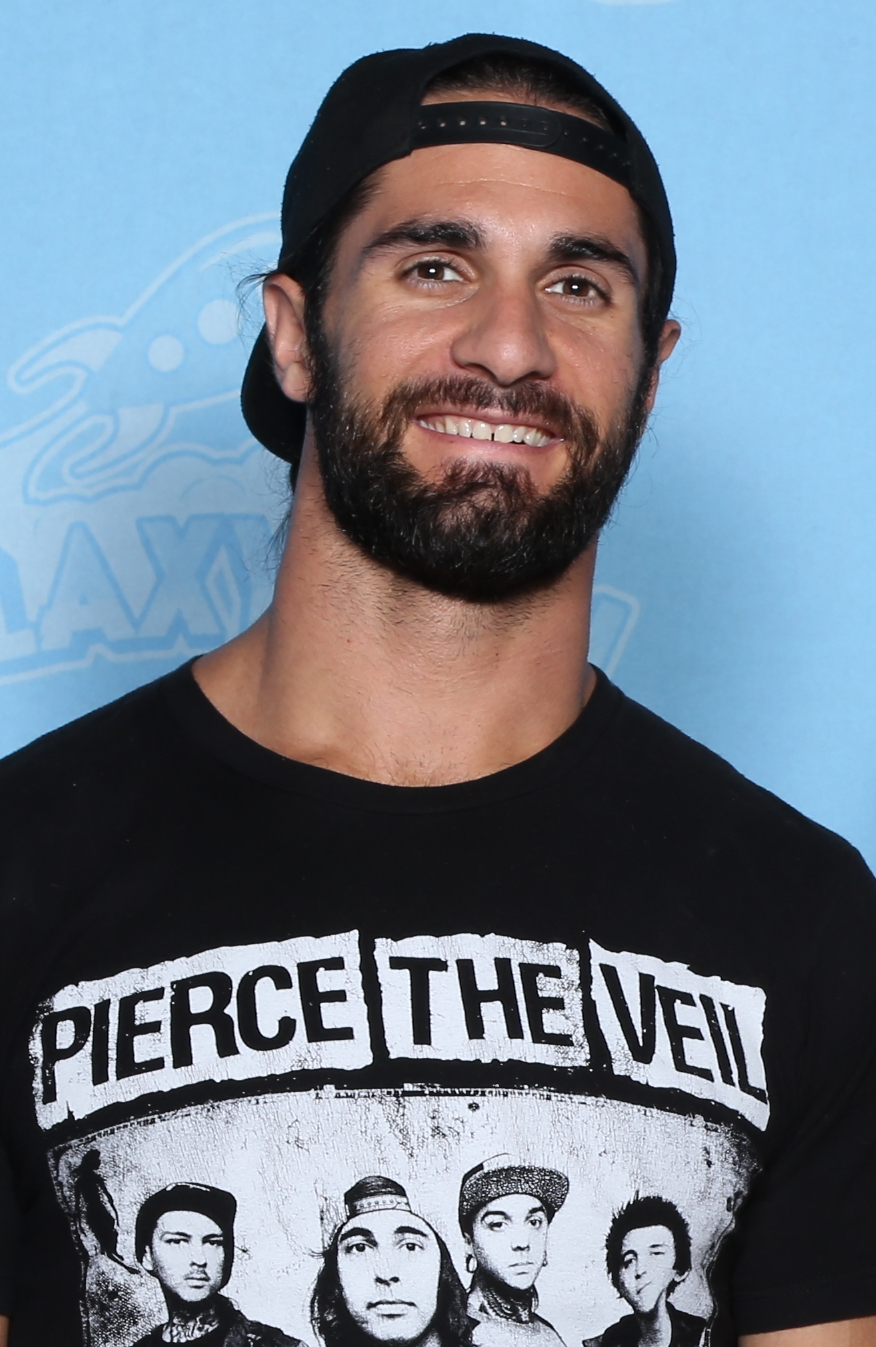
- Rollins in 2019

Personal information
- Born: Colby Daniel Lopez; May 28, 1986 (age 40) Davenport, Iowa, U.S.
- Spouse: Becky Lynch (m. 2021)
- Children: 1

Professional wrestling career
- Ring name(s): Gixx; Seth Rollins; Seth "Freakin" Rollins; Taj the Destroyer; Tyler Black
- Billed height: 6 ft 1 in (185 cm)
- Billed weight: 225 lb (102 kg)
- Billed from: Davenport, Iowa
- Trained by: Danny Daniels
- Debut: August 21, 2004

Signature
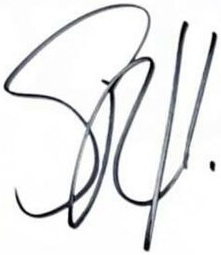

Colby Daniel Lopez (born May 28, 1986), better known by the ring name Seth Rollins, is an American professional wrestler. As of August 2010, he is signed to WWE, where he performs on the Raw brand.

Prior to signing with WWE, he wrestled under the ring name Tyler Black for Ring of Honor (ROH), holding the ROH World Championship once and the ROH World Tag Team Championship twice. He also wrestled for various independent promotions including Full Impact Pro, where he was a one-time FIP World Heavyweight Champion, as well as Pro Wrestling Guerrilla, where he was a one-time PWG World Tag Team Champion.

Lopez signed with WWE in 2010 and was sent to its then-developmental territory, Florida Championship Wrestling (FCW), where he was renamed Seth Rollins and became the inaugural FCW Grand Slam Champion. After WWE rebranded its developmental brand from FCW to NXT, he became the inaugural NXT Champion. In November 2012, he debuted on the main roster as a member of the stable known as The Shield, alongside Dean Ambrose and Roman Reigns. He won his first main roster championship, the WWE Tag Team Championship, (Note: Since April 2024 known as the World Tag Team Championship, it was called the WWE Tag Team Championship during his first reign and the WWE Raw Tag Team Championship in his subsequent five reigns.) with Reigns in May 2013; he has since held the title six times with various partners.

Rollins is a six-time world champion in WWE, having won each of the WWE Championship, (Note: Since April 2024 known as the Undisputed WWE Championship, it was called the WWE World Heavyweight Championship during both of his reigns.) WWE Universal Championship, and World Heavyweight Championship (WHC) titles twice, being the inaugural WHC champion. He is also WWE's 29th Triple Crown Champion and 19th Grand Slam Champion. Rollins topped Pro Wrestling Illustrated's PWI 500 list of the top 500 wrestlers in the world in 2015, 2019, and 2023, was voted as the PWI Wrestler of the Year in 2015 and 2023, and was named Wrestler of the Year by Sports Illustrated in 2022.

== Early life ==
Colby Daniel Lopez was born on May 28, 1986, in Davenport, Iowa. He is of Armenian, German, and Irish descent. He gained the Lopez surname from his Mexican-American stepfather, whom he considers his true father. He has a brother and a sister, but did not know this until their existence was revealed by a DNA test in 2019. He graduated from Davenport West High School in 2004. As a teenager, he was an introvert who lived a straight edge lifestyle and was a big fan of rock and heavy metal music. He trained at a wrestling school owned by Danny Daniels on the borders of Chicago and Oak Park.

== Professional wrestling career ==
=== Early career (2004–2010) ===
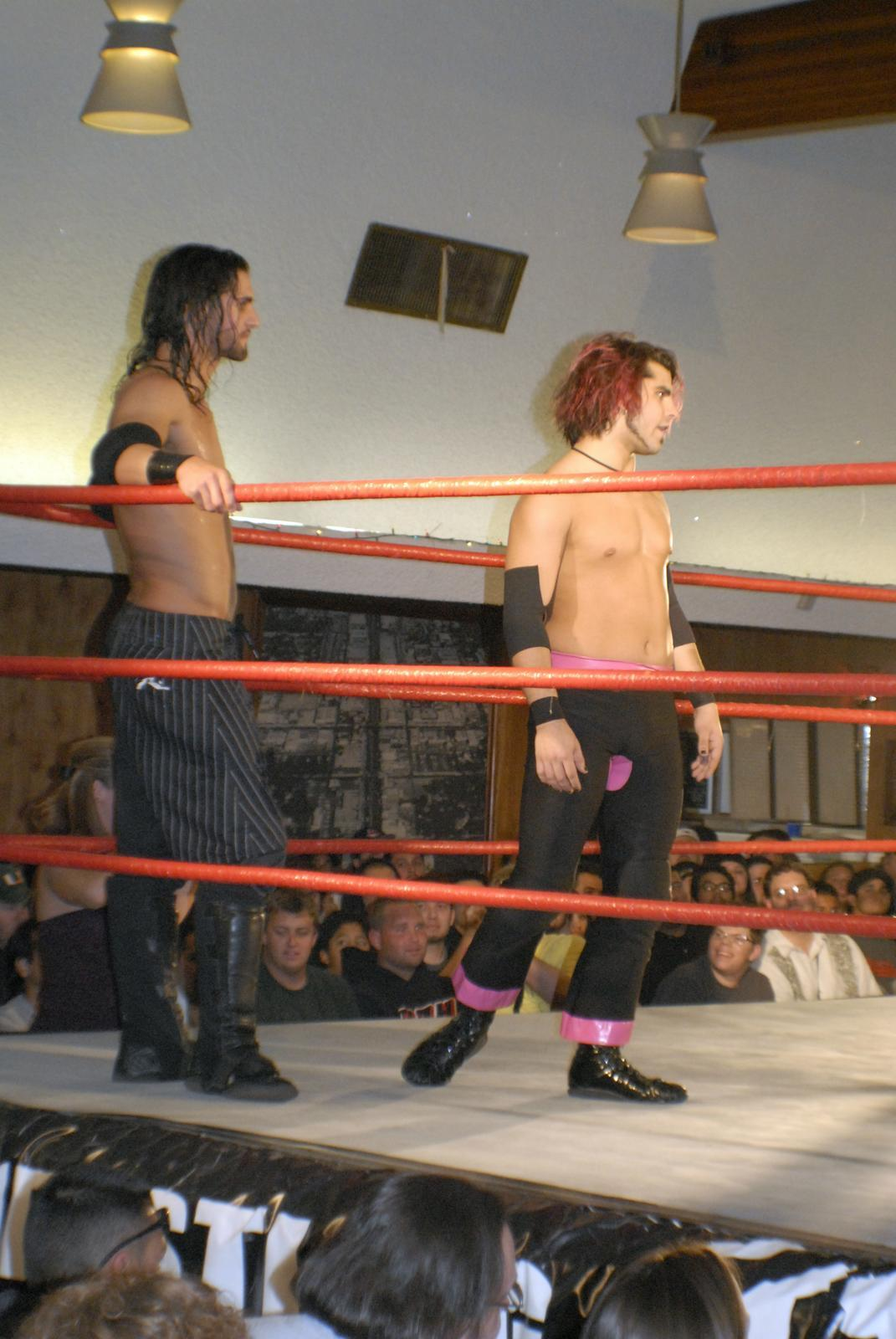
Black (left) alongside Age of the Fall leader Jimmy Jacobs at a PWG event in 2005

Lopez made his debut at the age of 18 on August 21, 2004, wrestling in the Iowa independent scene under the ring name Gixx. He then joined Ian Rotten's Independent Wrestling Association Mid-South (IWA) under the name Tyler Black, and entered the Ted Petty Invitational Tournament, defeating Sal Thomaselli before being eliminated by Matt Sydal in the quarterfinals in Hammond, Indiana on September 23, 2005.

He soon joined NWA Midwest and won the promotion's tag team championship with Marek Brave. The two retained the NWA Midwest Tag Team Championship against Ryan Boz and Danny Daniels, Brett Wayne and Hype Gotti and Jayson Reign and Marco Cordova several times in early 2006. He briefly appeared in Total Nonstop Action Wrestling (TNA) and teamed with Jeff Luxon in a loss to The Latin American Xchange (Homicide and Hernandez) on Impact! in October 2006.

On May 25, 2007, while in a match with then Full Impact Pro (FIP) Tag Team Champions The Briscoe Brothers (Jay and Mark Briscoe) in Melbourne, Florida, Black's tag team partner Marek Brave suffered a legitimate back injury, leading Black to pursue a singles career by competing in Pro Wrestling Guerrilla (PWG), where he defeated Joey Ryan in his debut on June 10.

At PWG's Life During Wartime on July 6, 2008, Black and Jimmy Jacobs won the PWG World Tag Team Championship by defeating Roderick Strong and El Generico, a replacement for Jack Evans. At FIP's event on December 20, Black defeated Go Shiozaki to win the FIP World Heavyweight Championship. At FIP's event on May 2, 2009, Davey Richards was awarded the FIP World Heavyweight Championship by forfeit when Black was unable to compete.

=== Ring of Honor (2007-2010) ===
==== The Age of the Fall (2007–2009) ====
At the Ring of Honor (ROH) pay-per-view taping of Man Up on September 15, 2007, Black made his debut alongside Jimmy Jacobs and Necro Butcher, with the three attacking The Briscoe Brothers, and hanging Jay Briscoe from light rigging fashioned as a noose. The three formed a stable called The Age of the Fall. The angle was so controversial that ROH decided to remove the footage from the pay-per-view that was being taped at the event. Black later made his ROH in-ring debut later that night in a dark match, wrestling Jack Evans to a no contest.

At Glory by Honor VI in November, Black defeated Alex "Sugarfoot" Payne, but was attacked by The Briscoe Brothers following the match. He appeared with The Age of the Fall in their match against The Briscoe Brothers during the main event. At Final Battle on December 30, Black and Jacobs defeated The Briscoe Brothers to win the ROH World Tag Team Championship. They lost the championship one month later on January 26, 2008, to the No Remorse Corps (Davey Richards and Rocky Romero) when competing in an Ultimate Endurance match also involving The Hangmen 3 (Brent Albright and B. J. Whitmer), and the team of Austin Aries and Bryan Danielson.

At Take No Prisoners on May 30, Black unsuccessfully challenged Nigel McGuinness for the ROH World Championship. At Up For Grabs, Black and Jacobs won an eight-team tournament to win their second ROH World Tag Team Championship. The two lost the championship at Driven on November 14 to the team of Kevin Steen and El Generico. Black had a second chance at the ROH World Championship at Death Before Dishonor VI in New York City, when he faced McGuinness, Danielson and Claudio Castagnoli in a four-way elimination match, but McGuinness retained the title.

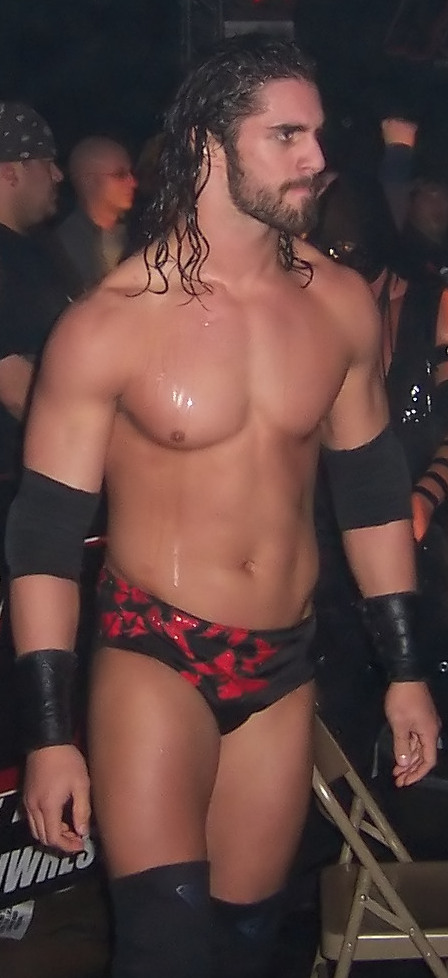
Black in December 2008

At Final Battle in December, after Black lost a number one contender match to Austin Aries, Jacobs turned on him, and Black was then attacked by Aries. At Full Circle, Black was given a non-title match against then-ROH World Champion Nigel McGuinness on January 16, 2009, where Black was victorious. The following night, Black faced McGuinness in a title match, which ended in a time limit draw. On June 26, at Violent Tendencies, Black defeated Jimmy Jacobs in a steel cage match to end their feud.

==== ROH World Champion and departure (2009–2010) ====
In September 2009, Black took a hiatus after receiving surgery on his neck. On October 10, Black defeated Kenny King in a first-round match and then Claudio Castagnoli, Colt Cabana, Delirious, Chris Hero and Roderick Strong in the finals to win the 2009 Survival of the Fittest tournament, earning him a ROH World Championship match. On December 19, at ROH's first live pay-per-view, Final Battle, Black wrestled then ROH World Champion Austin Aries to a 60-minute time limit draw. Because of this draw, then ROH commissioner Jim Cornette booked the two in a rematch between February 13, 2010, for the company's Eighth Anniversary Show. The booking saw Cornette set up a judging panel with himself on and one person picked by each competitor, in order for there to be a decisive winner in case of another draw. Aries picked King while Black picked Strong, whom he guaranteed an ROH World Championship title shot should he win. At the event, Black pinned Aries to win the ROH World Championship.

On April 3, Black retained the title in a three-way elimination match against Austin Aries and Roderick Strong at The Big Bang! pay-per-view. He also retained the title against Davey Richards on June 19 at Death Before Dishonor VIII. Black turned into a villain at the August 20 tapings of Ring of Honor Wrestling after news broke that he had signed a developmental contract with World Wrestling Entertainment (WWE). He threatened to take the ROH World Championship with him to WWE and refused to put the championship at stake in a match with Davey Richards on August 28, which he then lost by submission. On September 11, at Glory By Honor IX, in his final ROH appearance, Black lost the ROH World Championship to Roderick Strong in a no disqualification match with Terry Funk as a guest enforcer, ending his reign at 210 days after seven successful title defenses.

=== World Wrestling Entertainment/WWE ===
==== Developmental territories (2010–2012) ====
On August 8, 2010, Lopez signed a developmental contract with WWE and was assigned to their developmental territory Florida Championship Wrestling (FCW) in September. On September 14, Black made his WWE debut in a dark match prior to the SmackDown taping by defeating Trent Barreta.

Lopez debuted for FCW on September 30 under the name Seth Rollins, in a loss to Michael McGillicutty. Rollins then faced Hunico on November 4 in the first ever FCW 15 match under 15-minute Iron Man rules where they fought to a 1–1 draw. Following this, Rollins, along with Hunico, Richie Steamboat and Jinder Mahal, participated in the FCW 15 Jack Brisco Classic tournament. On January 13, 2011, Rollins defeated Hunico in the finals to win the tournament and became the inaugural FCW Jack Brisco 15 Champion. At a house show on March 25, Rollins and Steamboat defeated Damien Sandow and Titus O'Neil to win the FCW Florida Tag Team Championship, which they later dropped to Big E Langston and Calvin Raines.

In July 2011, Rollins began a feud with Dean Ambrose. Ambrose and Rollins had their first match for the FCW 15 Championship in a 15-minute Iron Man match on the August 14 episode of FCW, which ended in a draw with neither men scoring a fall and, as a result, Rollins retained his title. A subsequent 20-minute rematch for the title two weeks later resulted in a similar 0–0 draw. A second 30-minute rematch for the title on the September 18 episode of FCW went to a time limit 2–2 draw and the match was sent into sudden death overtime, where Rollins scored a pinfall to win the match 3–2. On September 22, Rollins lost the FCW 15 Championship to Damien Sandow by disqualification after Ambrose attacked Sandow late in the match. On February 23, 2012, Rollins defeated Leo Kruger to become the new FCW Florida Heavyweight Champion. Rollins lost the championship to Rick Victor at a house show on May 31.

When WWE rebranded FCW into NXT in August 2012, Rollins' NXT TV debut took place on the second episode of the rebooted NXT at Full Sail University on June 27, when he defeated Jiro. Rollins entered the Gold Rush Tournament to crown the inaugural NXT Champion where he defeated Jinder Mahal in the tournament finals on the August 29 episode of NXT. On the October 10 episode of NXT, Rollins had his first successful defense of his title against Michael McGillicutty.

On the January 2, 2013, episode of NXT, Rollins successfully defended the NXT Championship against Corey Graves, before losing it the next week on NXT to Big E Langston in a No Disqualification match. After losing the title, Rollins continued to feud with Graves and attacked him during his number one contender's match for the NXT Championship with Conor O'Brian. Rollins then accepted Graves' challenge and defeated him in a lumberjack match to end the feud.

==== The Shield (2012–2014) ====
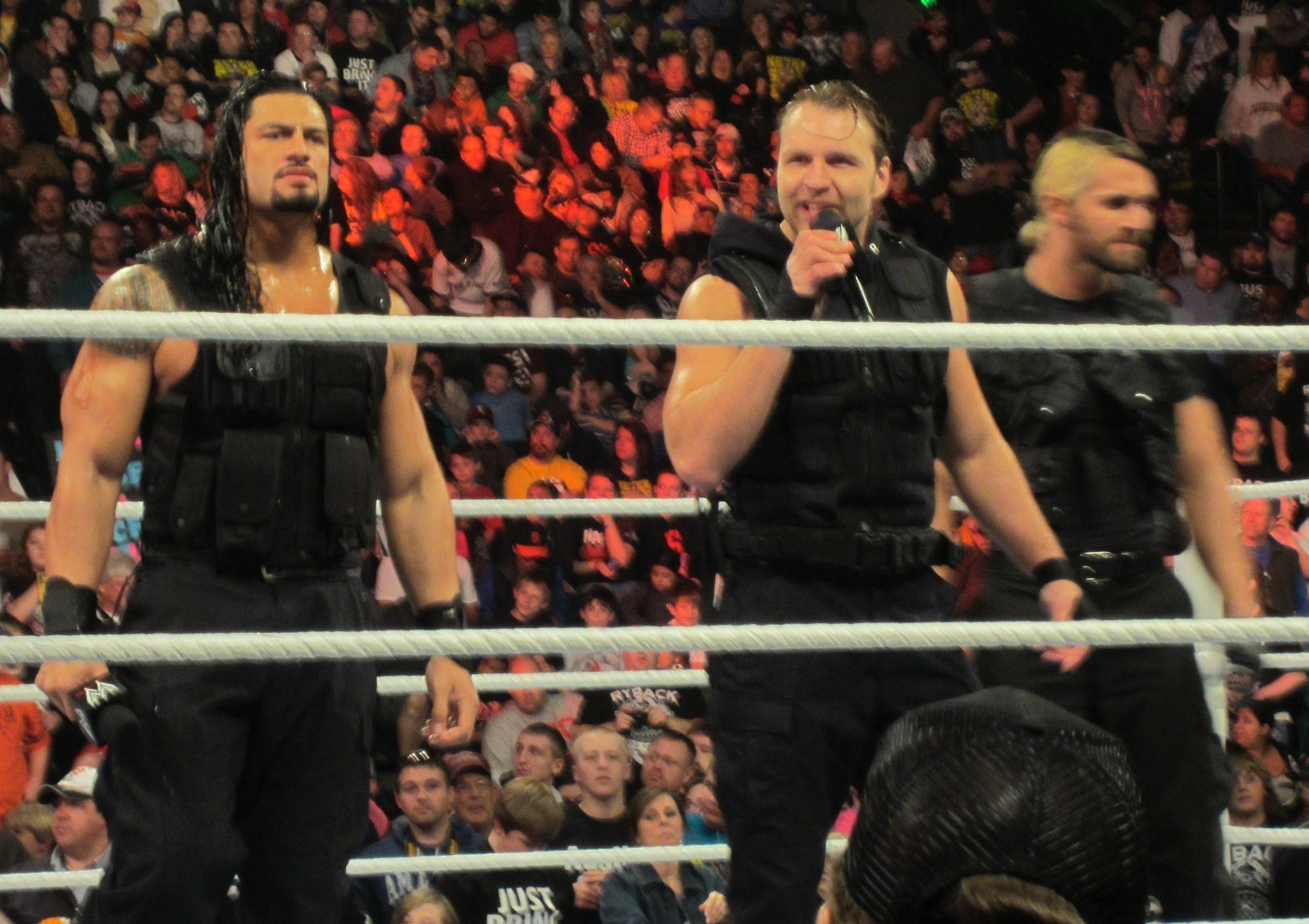
Rollins (right) debuted on WWE's main roster as a member of The Shield in November 2012.

On November 18, 2012, at the Survivor Series pay-per-view, Seth Rollins made his main roster debut as a heel alongside Dean Ambrose and Roman Reigns, attacking Ryback during the triple threat main event for the WWE Championship, allowing CM Punk to pin John Cena and retain the title. The trio declared themselves The Shield, vowed to rally against "injustice" and denied working for Punk, but routinely emerged from the crowd to attack Punk's adversaries. This led to a Tables, Ladders and Chairs match at TLC: Tables, Ladders & Chairs on December 16, where The Shield defeated Team Hell No (Daniel Bryan and Kane) and Ryback in their WWE debut match. The Shield continued to aid Punk after TLC, attacking both Ryback and The Rock (at Royal Rumble) in January 2013. It was revealed on the January 28 episode of Raw that Punk and his manager Paul Heyman had been paying The Shield and Brad Maddox to work for them.

The Shield then quietly ended their association with Punk while beginning a feud with John Cena, Ryback and Sheamus that led to a six-man tag match on February 17 at Elimination Chamber, which The Shield won. On April 7, they defeated Sheamus, Big Show and Randy Orton at WrestleMania 29. The following night on Raw, The Shield attempted to attack The Undertaker, but were stopped by Team Hell No. This set up a six-man tag team match on the April 22 episode of Raw, which The Shield won. On the May 13 episode of Raw, The Shield's undefeated streak in televised six-man tag team matches ended in a disqualification loss in a six-man elimination tag team match against John Cena, Kane and Daniel Bryan.

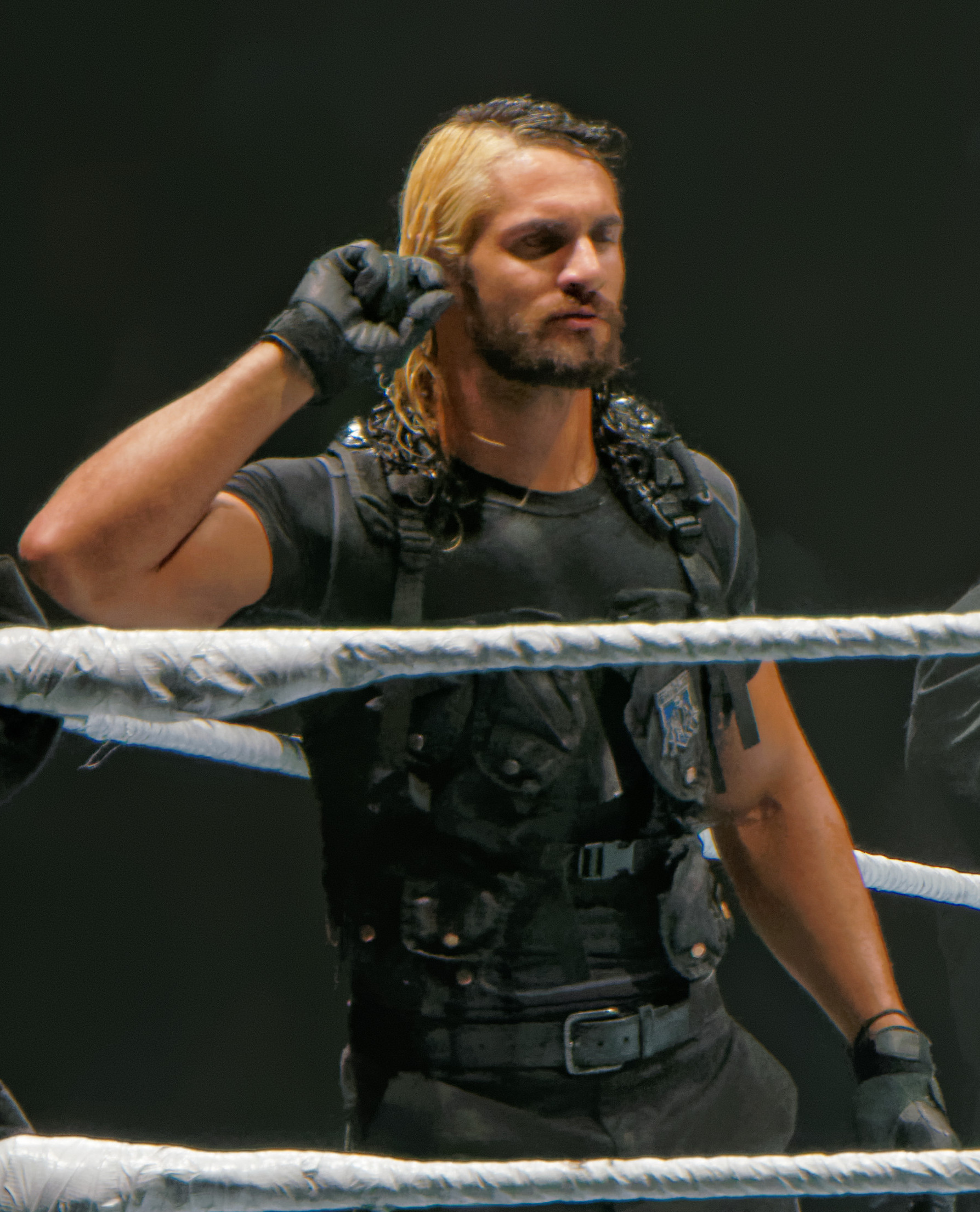
Rollins at a live event in November 2013

On May 19, at Extreme Rules, Rollins and Reigns defeated Team Hell No in a tornado tag team match to win the WWE Tag Team Championship. On the June 14 episode of SmackDown, The Shield suffered their first decisive loss in televised six-man tag team matches against Team Hell No and Randy Orton when Bryan made Rollins submit. Rollins and Reigns successfully retained the WWE Tag Team Championship against Bryan and Orton at Payback on June 13. In August, The Shield began working for Chief operating officer Triple H and The Authority. They retained their titles against The Usos at the Money in the Bank pre-show on July 14, and against The Prime Time Players (Darren Young and Titus O'Neil) at Night of Champions on September 15. At Battleground on October 6, the recently (kayfabe) fired Cody Rhodes and Goldust reclaimed their jobs by defeating Rollins and Reigns in a non-title match.

On the October 14 episode of Raw, Rollins and Reigns lost the titles to Rhodes and Goldust in a No Disqualification match following interference from Big Show. At Hell in a Cell on October 27, Rollins and Reigns failed to regain the titles in a triple threat match also involving The Usos. At Survivor Series on November 24, The Shield teamed with Antonio Cesaro and Jack Swagger, facing Rey Mysterio, The Usos, Cody Rhodes and Goldust in a traditional Survivor Series match. Although Rollins was eliminated by Mysterio, Reigns won the match for the team. At TLC: Tables, Ladders & Chairs on December 15, The Shield lost to CM Punk in 3-on-1 handicap match after Reigns accidentally speared Ambrose. On January 26, 2014, at the Royal Rumble, Rollins entered his first Royal Rumble match at number 2, gaining three eliminations before he was eliminated by teammate Reigns. The next night on Raw, The Shield competed against Daniel Bryan, Sheamus and John Cena in a six-man tag team qualifying match to enter the Elimination Chamber match for the WWE World Heavyweight Championship, but lost the match via disqualification after The Wyatt Family (Bray Wyatt, Erick Rowan and Luke Harper) interfered and attacked Cena, Bryan, and Sheamus. At Elimination Chamber on February 23, The Shield were defeated by the Wyatt Family in a rematch.

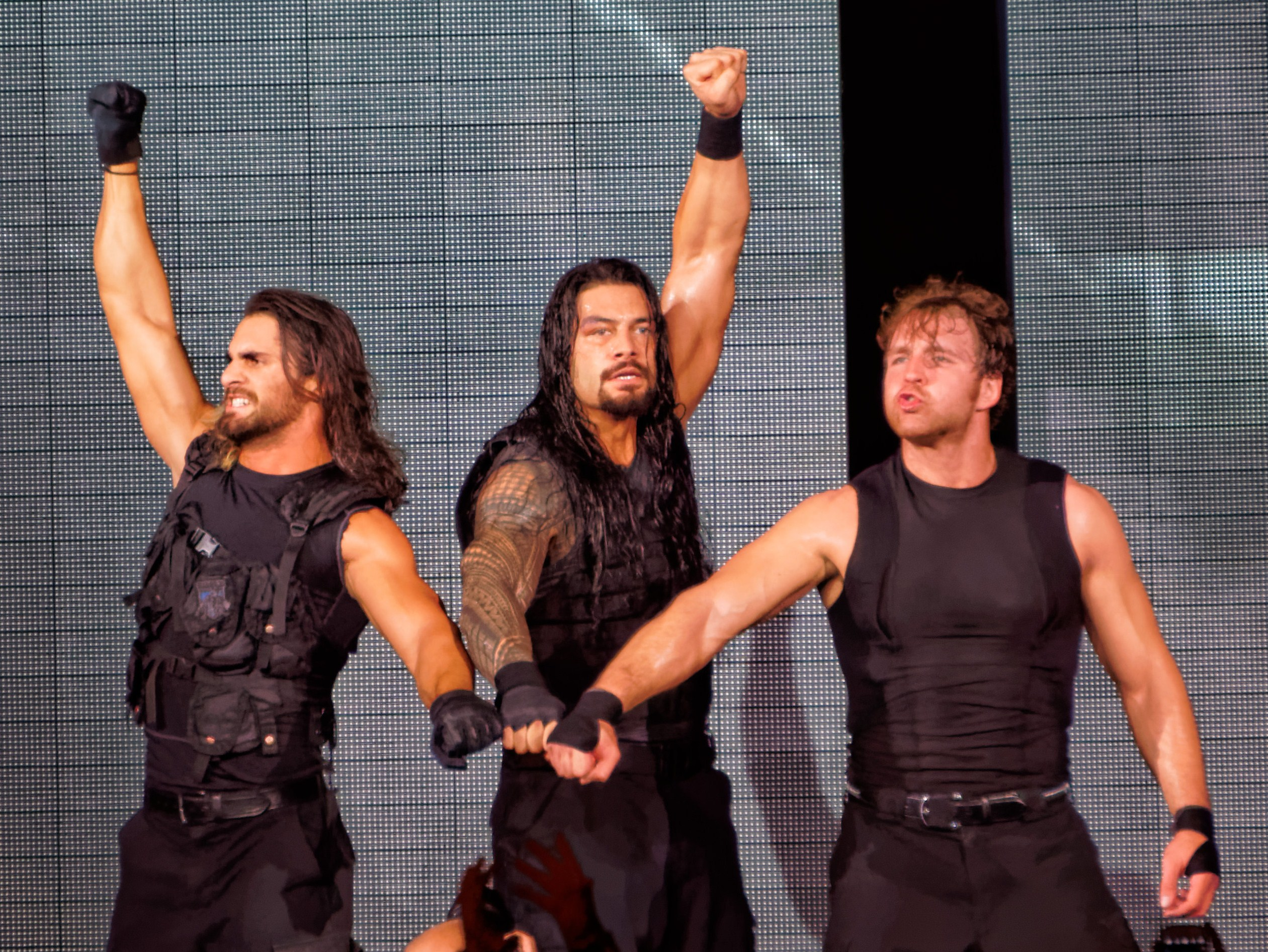
The Shield performing their signature pose in May 2014

Later in March, The Shield began a feud with Kane, turning face in the process. At WrestleMania XXX on April 6, The Shield defeated Kane and The New Age Outlaws (Billy Gunn and Road Dogg). The Shield then feuded with Triple H, the COO of WWE and leader of The Authority, who reformed Evolution with Batista and Randy Orton to take on The Shield. The Shield defeated Evolution at Extreme Rules on May 4, and again on June 1 at Payback in a No Holds Barred elimination match, in which no members of The Shield were eliminated.

==== WWE Champion (2014–2016) ====
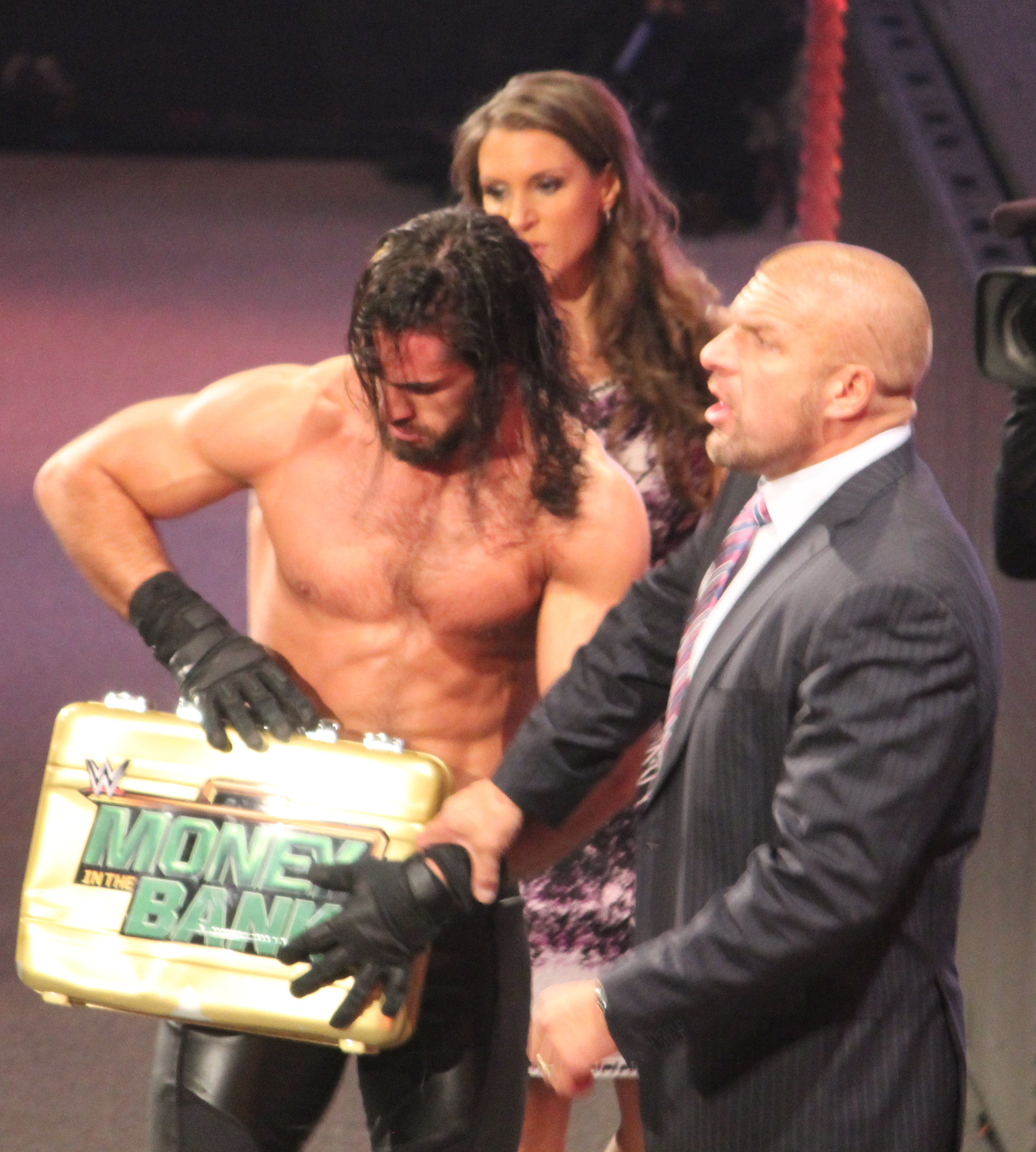
Rollins, accompanied by Triple H and Stephanie McMahon, carrying his Money in the Bank contract in September 2014

On the June 2 episode of Raw, Rollins turned on Ambrose and Reigns to rejoin The Authority, turning heel once again. On June 29, Rollins won the Money in the Bank ladder match at the titular event after interference from Kane. Rollins defeated Ambrose at Battleground on July 20 via forfeit after their match was called off by Triple H after a pre-match attack by Ambrose on Rollins backstage, as well as at SummerSlam on August 17 in a lumberjack match after hitting him with his Money in the Bank briefcase following interference from Kane. The following night on Raw, Rollins defeated Ambrose once again in a Falls Count Anywhere match by referee stoppage after Kane interfered again and helped Rollins execute a Curb Stomp on Ambrose through cinder blocks, giving him a kayfabe injury. On September 21, at Night of Champions, a scheduled match between Rollins and Reigns ended in Rollins being declared the winner via forfeit since Reigns developed a legitimate incarcerated hernia which required surgery prior to the event. He was then attacked by a returning Ambrose. Shortly after, Rollins adopted Jamie Noble and Joey Mercury as bodyguards, being named "J&J Security". The feud between Rollins and Ambrose culminated on October 26 at Hell in a Cell, where Rollins defeated Ambrose in a Hell in a Cell match after Bray Wyatt interfered and attacked Ambrose. Following Hell in a Cell, tension began growing between Rollins and Randy Orton due to The Authority's preferential treatment of Rollins. After defeating Orton on the November 3 episode of Raw, Orton attacked The Authority but was overpowered, resulting in Rollins performing a Curb Stomp on Orton onto the steel ring steps, kayfabe injuring him. At Survivor Series on November 23, Rollins captained Team Authority in a five-on-five elimination tag team match against Team Cena, in which he was the sole survivor for his team and the last man eliminated by Dolph Ziggler, resulting in The Authority being ousted from control of WWE. At TLC: Tables, Ladders & Chairs on December 14, he lost to Cena in a tables match. On the January 5, 2015, episode of Raw, The Authority regained control over WWE.

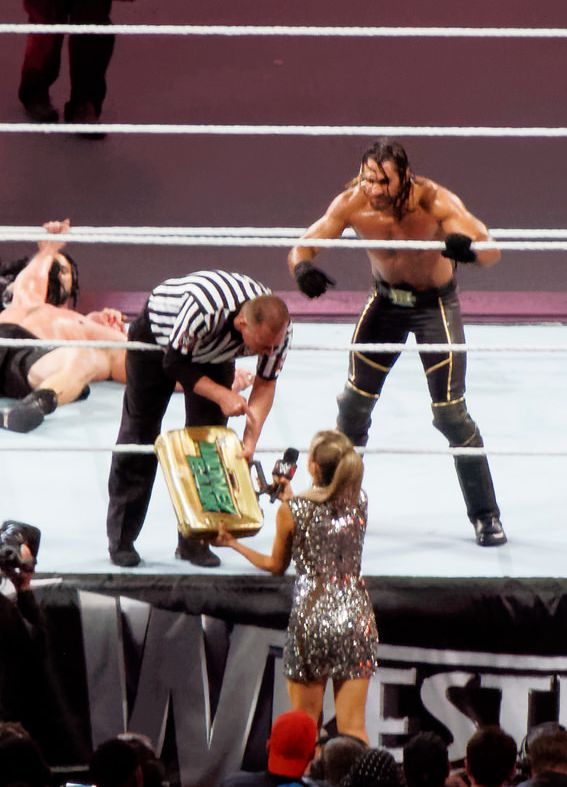
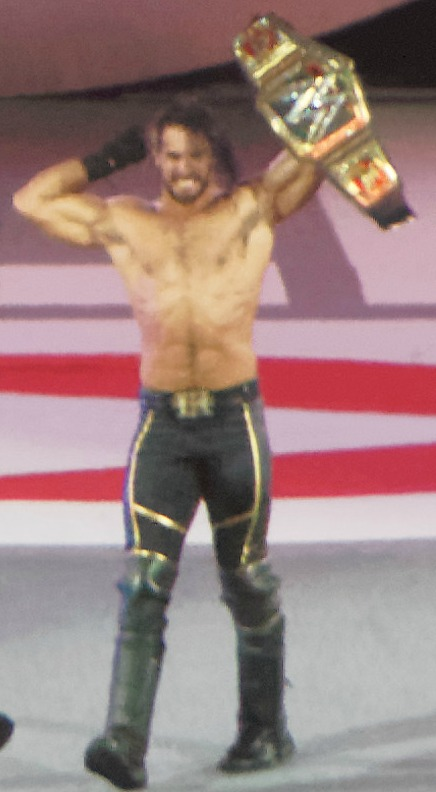
Rollins cashed in his Money in the Bank contact at WrestleMania 31 to win the WWE World Heavyweight Championship

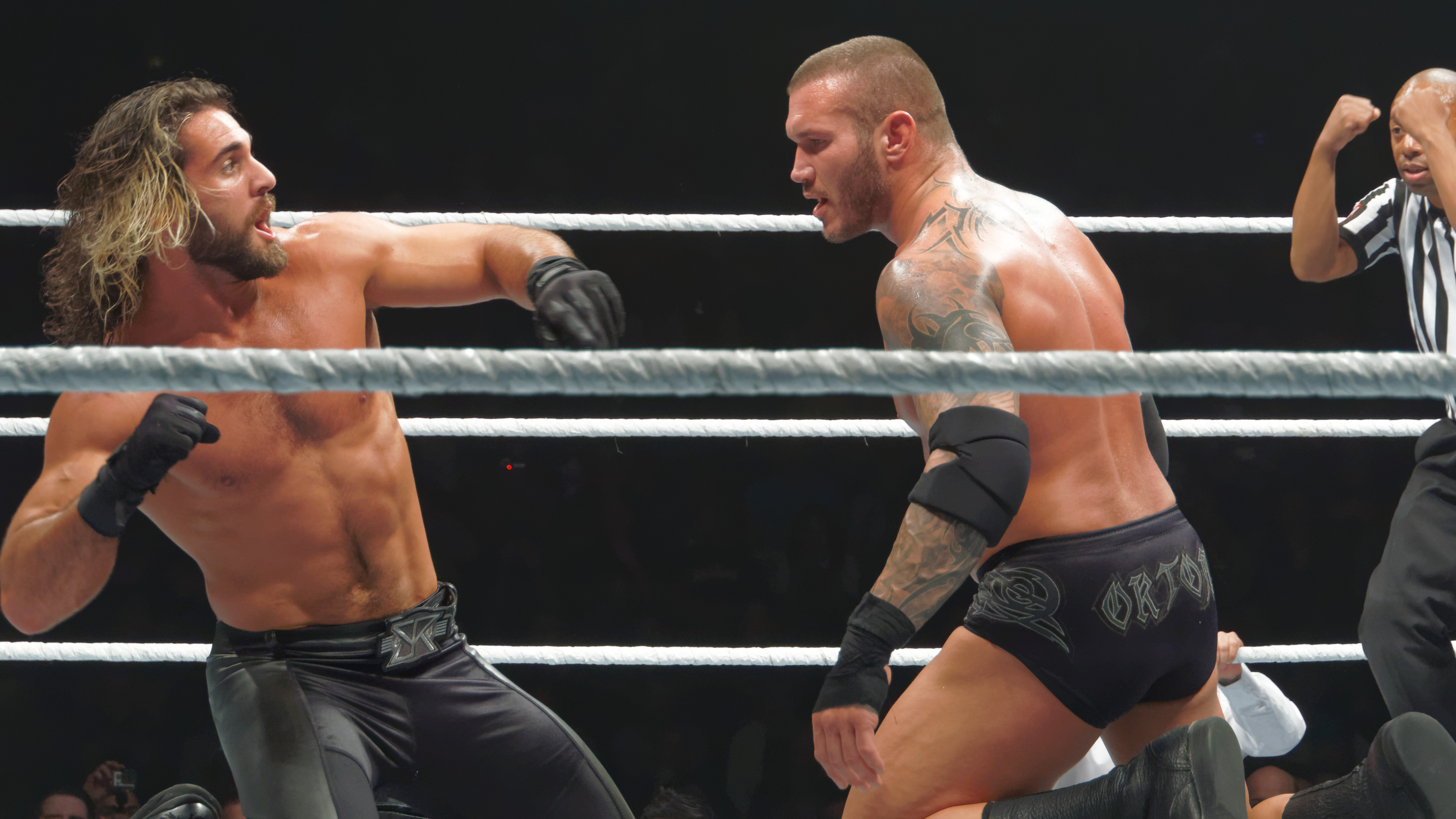
Rollins battling against Randy Orton in 2015

At Royal Rumble on January 25, Rollins failed to win a triple threat match for the WWE World Heavyweight Championship against Cena and champion Brock Lesnar. At Fastlane on February 22, Rollins, Big Show and Kane defeated Ziggler, Erick Rowan and Ryback. After the match, Orton returned and attacked Noble, Mercury and Kane, while Rollins fled the arena. On March 29, at WrestleMania 31, Rollins lost to Orton. Later that night, Rollins cashed in his Money in the Bank contract during Lesnar and Reigns' WWE World Heavyweight Championship match, turning it into a triple threat match and pinned Reigns to win the title for the first time in his career, making him the first man to cash in his Money in the Bank contract at WrestleMania and during a title match. Rollins continued his feud with Orton after WrestleMania, which led to a steel cage match for the championship with Kane residing as special guest "gatekeeper" at Extreme Rules on April 26, where Rollins retained after interference from the latter. At Payback on May 17, Rollins successfully defended the title against Orton, Reigns, and Ambrose in a fatal-four-way match after pinning Orton. Rollins retained the championship against Ambrose on May 31 at Elimination Chamber after getting himself disqualified, and in a ladder match at Money in the Bank on June 14.

At Battleground on July 19, Rollins retained the title by disqualification against Brock Lesnar after The Undertaker attacked Lesnar. On August 23, Rollins defeated United States Champion John Cena in a Winner Takes All match at SummerSlam for both the WWE World Heavyweight and the United States Championships after interference from Jon Stewart, making him the first and only wrestler to hold both championships simultaneously. At Night of Champions on September 20, Rollins lost the United States Championship back to Cena but was able to retain the WWE World Heavyweight Championship against Sting later that night. At Live from Madison Square Garden on October 3, Rollins failed to regain the United States Championship from Cena in a steel cage match. At Hell in a Cell on October 25, Rollins retained the WWE World Heavyweight Championship against Kane and per the match stipulation, Kane was fired as Director of Operations.

On November 4, during a match against Kane at a WWE live event in Dublin, Ireland, Rollins tore the ACL, MCL and medial meniscus in his knee while attempting to execute a sunset flip powerbomb. The injury required surgery and it was estimated it would take Rollins out of action for approximately six to nine months, therefore he was forced to vacate the WWE World Heavyweight Championship the next day, ending his reign at 220 days. WWE recognizes his reign as lasting 219 days. On the December 21 episode of Raw, Rollins made a special appearance to accept his Slammy Award for 2015 Superstar of the Year.

At Extreme Rules on May 22, 2016, Rollins returned from injury, attacking Roman Reigns with a Pedigree after his WWE World Heavyweight Championship defense against AJ Styles. The following night on Raw, Shane McMahon scheduled a match between Reigns and Rollins for the title at Money in the Bank. At the event on June 19, Rollins defeated Reigns to win his second WWE World Heavyweight Championship, becoming the first wrestler to legitimately defeat Reigns in singles competition on the main roster, only to lose the title minutes later to Dean Ambrose, who cashed in the Money in the Bank contract he won earlier that night. In July, Rollins failed to regain the renamed WWE Championship from Ambrose on both Raw and SmackDown. During the 2016 WWE draft on July 19, Rollins was drafted to Raw as the brand's first draft pick. At Battleground on July 24, Rollins unsuccessfully competed in a triple threat match against Ambrose and Reigns for the newly renamed WWE World Championship, which became exclusive to the SmackDown brand. Because of this, the WWE Universal Championship was introduced the following night on Raw. Rollins lost the inaugural title match against Finn Bálor on August 21 at SummerSlam.

==== The Shield reunion (2016–2017) ====
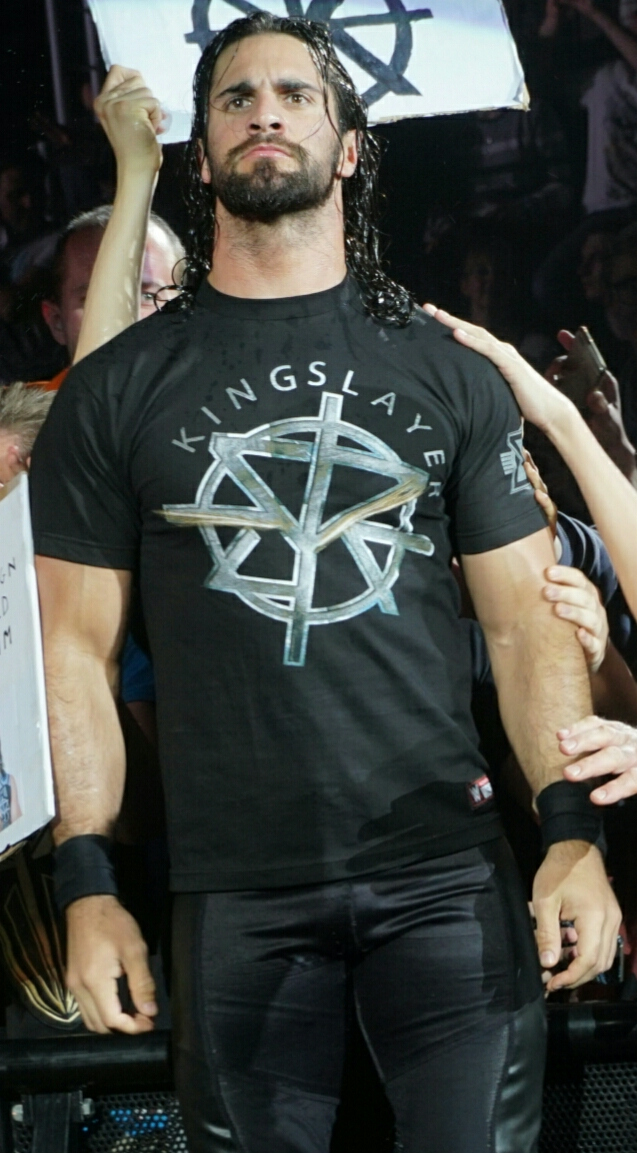
Rollins in May 2017 at a house show. The name Kingslayer on his shirt is in reference to his win over Triple H at WrestleMania 33.

After Bálor relinquished the title the following night on Raw due to a legit shoulder injury sustained at SummerSlam, Rollins faced Big Cass, Kevin Owens and Roman Reigns in a four-way elimination match for the title, but Triple H interfered and attacked Rollins, allowing Owens to win the championship. On the September 5 episode of Raw, Rollins attacked Owens during his celebration ceremony, turning face for the first time since 2014. Rollins failed to win the title from Owens at Clash of Champions on September 25 and Hell in a Cell on October 30 due to several interferences from Chris Jericho. At Survivor Series on November 20, Rollins formed part of Team Raw with Owens, Jericho, Braun Strowman and Reigns in a losing effort to Team SmackDown. At Roadblock: End of the Line on December 18, Rollins defeated Jericho.

In January 2017, Rollins started a feud with Triple H leading into WrestleMania. On January 28, Rollins appeared at NXT TakeOver: San Antonio, interrupting the show and demanding to confront Triple H, who came out only to order security to remove Rollins from the ring. On the January 30 episode of Raw, Rollins confronted Stephanie McMahon and once again called out Triple H, demanding answers for his betrayal. Later that night, Rollins was ambushed from behind by the debuting Samoa Joe, who choked him out in the Coquina Clutch. Rollins signed a contract to compete against Triple H in a non-sanctioned match on April 2 at WrestleMania 33, which he won. Rollins defeated Joe at Payback on April 30 to give Joe his first singles loss on the main roster. At Extreme Rules on June 4, Rollins competed in a fatal five-way Extreme Rules match to determine the number one contender to the WWE Universal Championship also involving Bálor, Joe, Reigns and Wyatt, which Joe won.

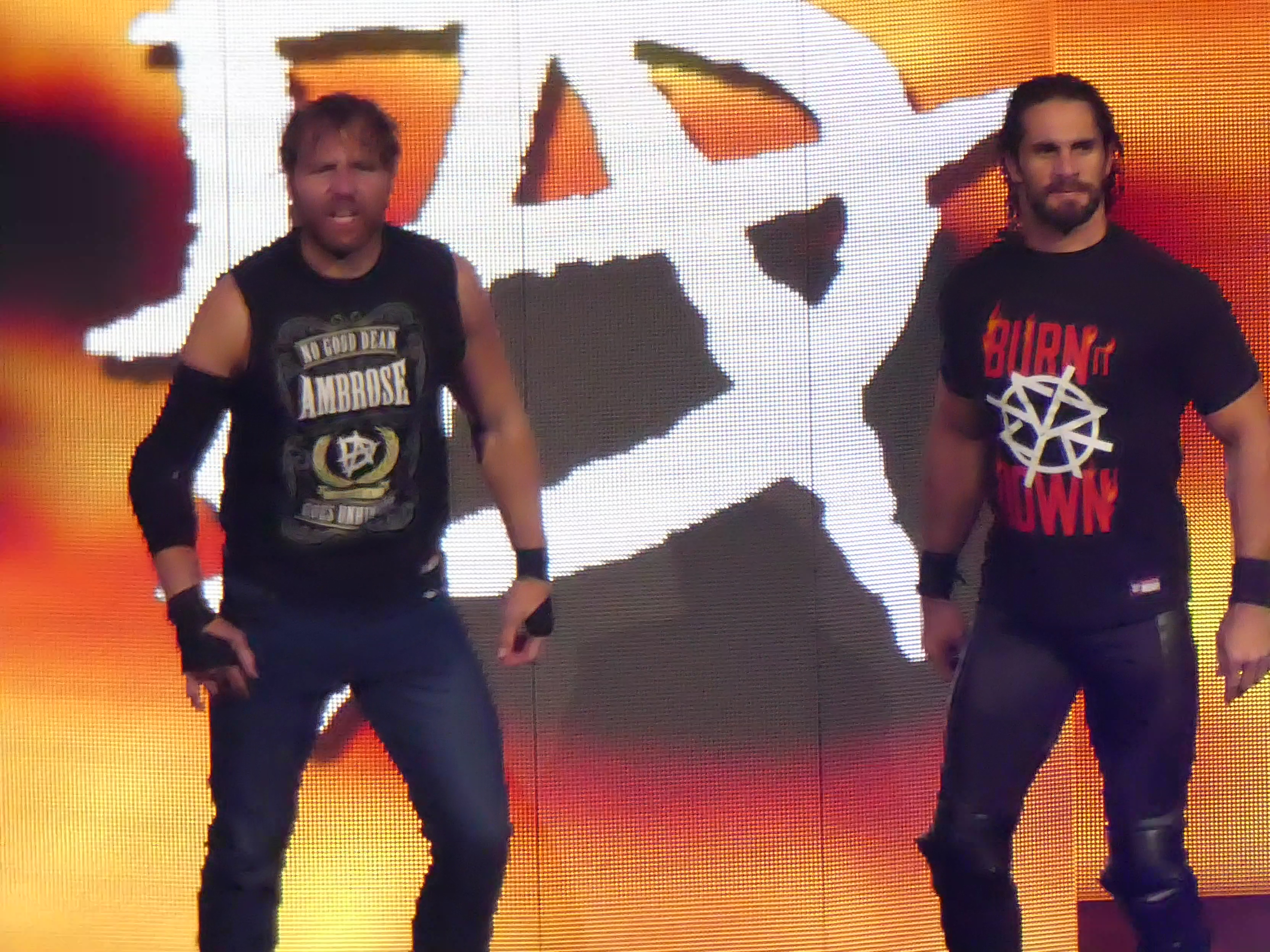
In August 2017, Rollins reunited with Dean Ambrose to reform part of The Shield.

On the July 10 episode of Raw, Rollins saved Dean Ambrose from an attack by The Miz and the Miztourage (Curtis Axel and Bo Dallas). After failing to gain Ambrose's trust for several weeks, the two argued in the ring on the August 14 episode of Raw and brawled with each other before fighting off Cesaro and Sheamus, reuniting the team in the process. At SummerSlam on August 20, Ambrose and Rollins defeated Cesaro and Sheamus to win the Raw Tag Team Championship, successfully defending the titles in a rematch at No Mercy on September 24. On the October 9 episode of Raw, Rollins and Ambrose reunited with Roman Reigns. The newly reformed Shield was due to face Braun Strowman, Cesaro, Kane, The Miz and Sheamus at TLC: Tables, Ladders & Chairs on October 22 in a 5-on-3 handicap Tables, Ladders and Chairs match, but Reigns was replaced over an illness concern by Kurt Angle and they won the match. Ambrose and Rollins lost the titles back to Cesaro and Sheamus on the November 6 episode of Raw due to SmackDown's The New Day distracting the champions, ending their reign at 78 days (WWE recognizes their reign as lasting 79 days). At Survivor Series on November 19, The Shield defeated The New Day. In December, Ambrose suffered a torn biceps, sidelining him for approximately nine months, putting The Shield on hiatus.

==== Intercontinental Champion (2017–2018) ====
On the December 25 episode of Raw, Rollins and Jason Jordan won the Raw Tag Team Championship from Cesaro and Sheamus. At the Royal Rumble on January 28, 2018, Rollins entered at number 18 in the Royal Rumble match, but was eliminated by Reigns. Right after the Royal Rumble match, they lost the titles back to Cesaro and Sheamus, ending their reign at 34 days. After their tag team dissolved due to Jordan having neck surgery, Rollins was named as a competitor in the Elimination Chamber match to determine the #1 contender for the Universal Championship. On the February 19 episode of Raw, Rollins competed in a seven-men gauntlet match to decide who would enter the Elimination Chamber match last, but was ultimately eliminated by Elias. Rollins wrestled for one hour and five minutes, marking the longest performance in a match by any wrestler in the show's history. Six days later, at Elimination Chamber, Rollins was the fifth man eliminated by Braun Strowman in the match.

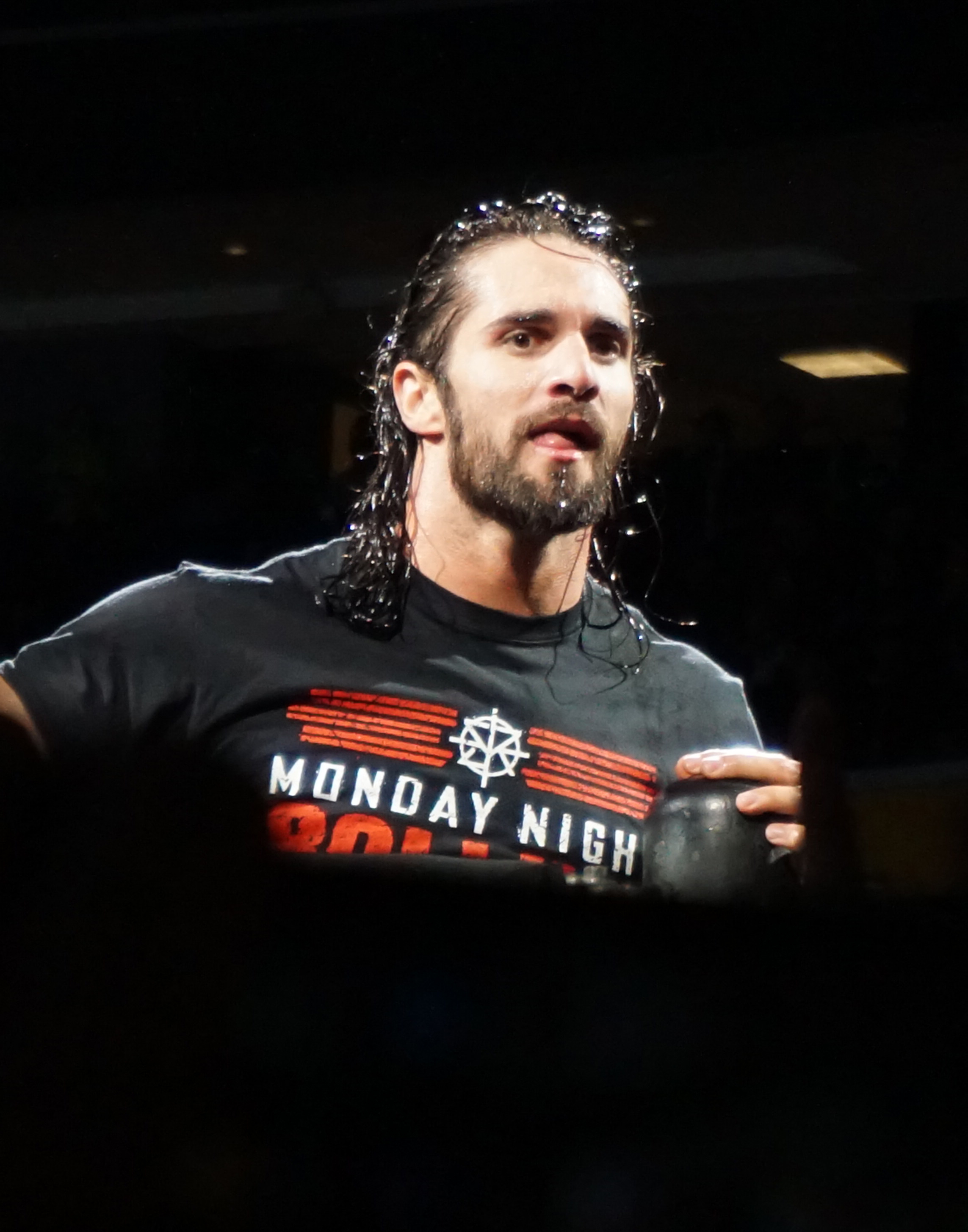
Rollins in March 2018

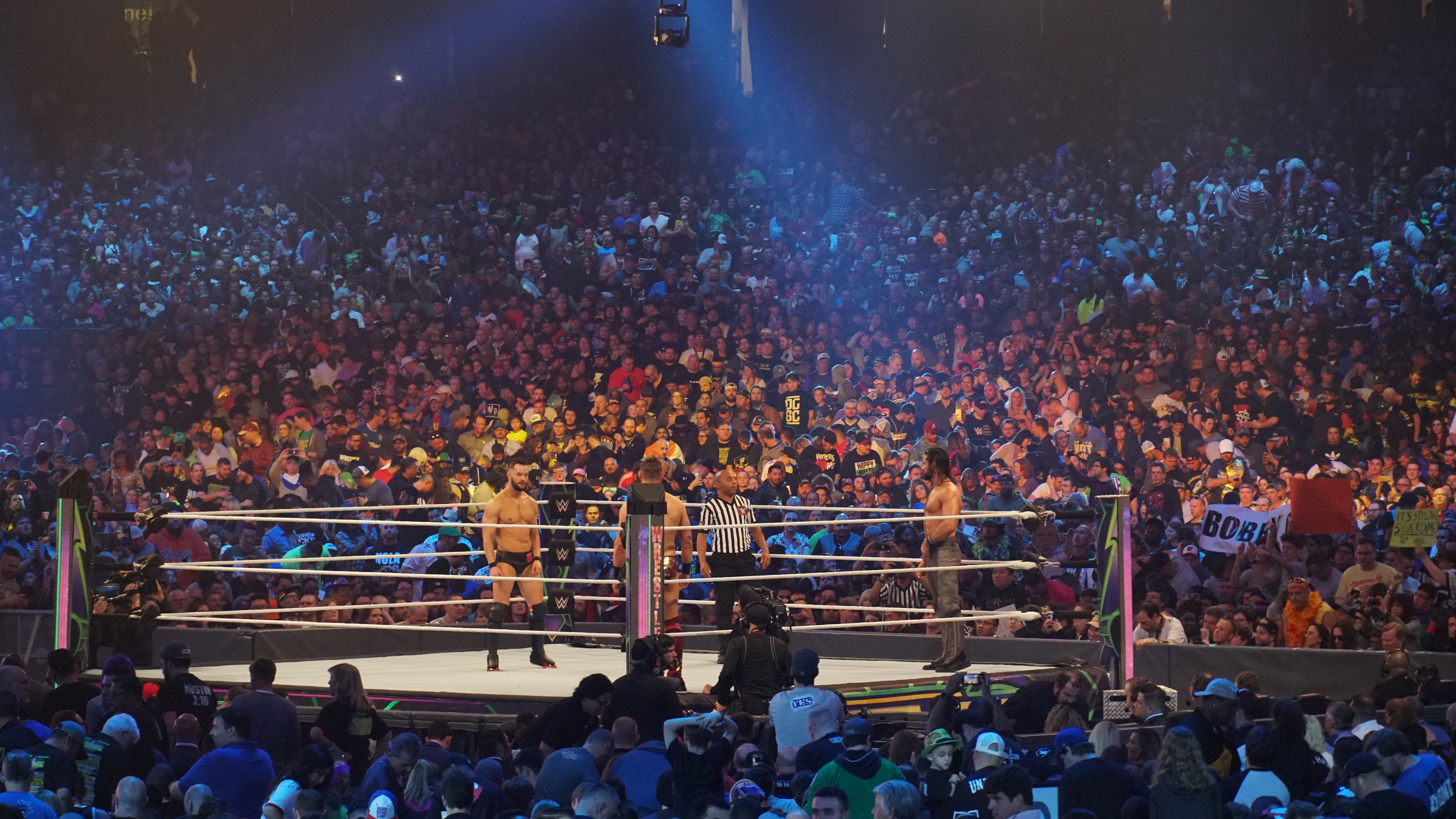
Rollins (right) vs Finn Bálor and The Miz at WrestleMania 34 for the WWE Intercontinental Championship

At WrestleMania 34 on April 8, Rollins defeated Finn Bálor and The Miz in a triple threat match to win the Intercontinental Championship for the first time in his career. With his win, Rollins became the twenty-ninth Triple Crown Champion and the eighteenth Grand Slam Champion in WWE history, respectively. He successfully defended the championship against The Miz at Backlash on May 6 and Elias on June 17 at Money in the Bank, before losing it to Dolph Ziggler the following night on Raw after a distraction by Ziggler's ally, Drew McIntyre, ending his reign at 71 days. Rollins failed to regain the title from Ziggler in a 30-minute Iron Man match at Extreme Rules on July 15 after interference from McIntyre.

On August 19, at SummerSlam, Rollins defeated Ziggler to regain the championship after enlisting the help of a returning Dean Ambrose. The next night on Raw, Rollins reformed The Shield with Ambrose and Roman Reigns, preventing Strowman from cashing in his Money in the Bank contract for the Universal Championship against Reigns. At Hell in a Cell on September 16, Rollins and Ambrose failed to win the Raw Tag Team Championship from McIntyre and Ziggler. At Super Show-Down on October 6, The Shield defeated McIntyre, Ziggler and Strowman in a six-man tag team match. Two nights later on Raw, The Shield was defeated by the trio in a rematch, with Ambrose walking away from his teammates after their defeat.

On the October 22 episode of Raw, Reigns took a hiatus due to his legitimate returning leukemia. Later that night, Rollins and Ambrose defeated Ziggler and McIntyre to win the Raw Tag Team Championship (making Rollins a 2-time Double Champion), only for Ambrose to turn on Rollins as he attacked him, igniting a feud between the two and disbanding The Shield once again. Rollins and Ambrose lost the titles on the November 5 episode of Raw, when Rollins lost a handicap match to AOP (Akam and Rezar). On November 18, at Survivor Series, Rollins defeated United States Champion Shinsuke Nakamura in an interbrand champion vs. champion match. On December 16, at TLC: Tables, Ladders & Chairs, Rollins lost the Intercontinental Championship to Ambrose, ending his reign at 119 days. Rollins failed to regain the championship from Ambrose on several occasions, including in a Falls Count Anywhere match when Lashley interfered, and in a triple threat match where Lashley won the championship after pinning Ambrose.

==== Universal Champion (2018–2019) ====
At the Royal Rumble on January 27, 2019, Rollins won his first Royal Rumble match by lastly eliminating Braun Strowman. The following night on Raw, Rollins challenged Brock Lesnar for the Universal Championship at WrestleMania 35. Soon after, Rollins reconciled with Ambrose and the recently returned Reigns to reform The Shield for the third time, defeating McIntyre, Lashley and Baron Corbin on March 10 at Fastlane. At WrestleMania 35 on April 7, Rollins defeated Lesnar to win the Universal Championship for the first time.

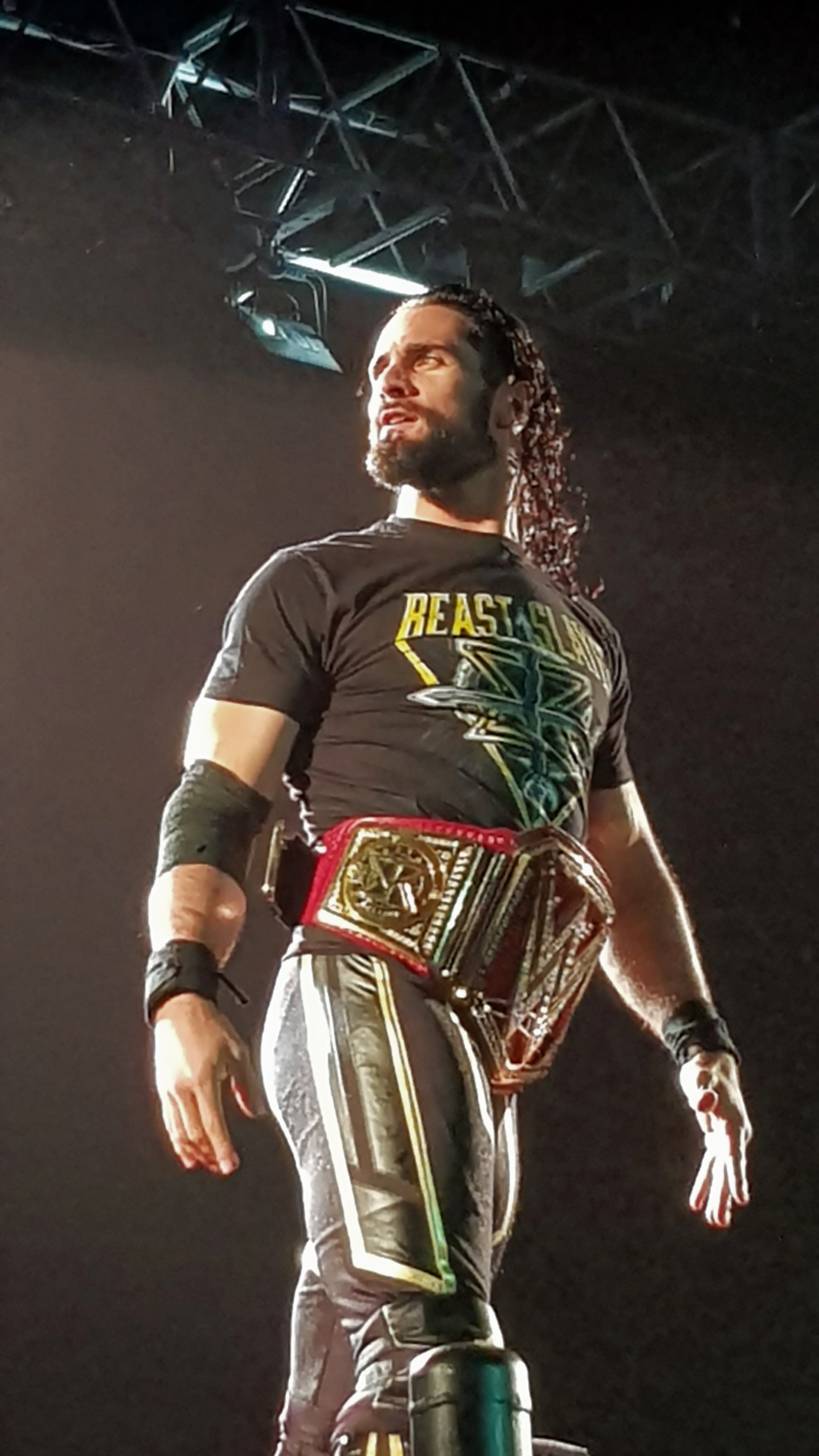
Rollins as Universal Champion in May 2019

Rollins then entered a feud with AJ Styles, retaining the Universal Championship against him on May 19 at Money in the Bank. Rollins successfully defended the title against Corbin at Super ShowDown on June 7, and at Stomping Grounds on June 23; the latter title defense featured Lacey Evans as special guest referee. He won with assistance of his real-life wife and Raw Women's Champion Becky Lynch to overcome the biased refereeing from Evans. Rollins and Lynch defeated Corbin and Evans at Extreme Rules on July 14 in a Winner Takes All Extreme Rules match mixed tag team match. Afterwards, Rollins lost the title to Lesnar, who cashed in his Money in the Bank contract, ending his reign at 98 days. The following night on Raw, Rollins won a ten-man battle royal for the right to face Lesnar for the championship at SummerSlam by last eliminating Randy Orton. At the event on August 11, Rollins defeated Lesnar to regain the championship, making him the second wrestler to hold the Universal Championship more than once. He also became the first superstar to defeat Lesnar at both WrestleMania and SummerSlam.

On the August 19 episode of Raw, Rollins became a 3-time Double Champion when him and Braun Strowman defeated Karl Anderson and Luke Gallows to win the Raw Tag Team Championship. At Clash of Champions on September 15, Rollins and Strowman lost the titles to Dolph Ziggler and Robert Roode. Later that night, Rollins retained the Universal Championship against Strowman but was attacked by "The Fiend" Bray Wyatt after the match. At Hell in a Cell on October 6, Rollins defended his title against The Fiend in a Hell in a Cell match that ended in referee stoppage after The Fiend was buried under several weapons and hit with a sledgehammer by Rollins, a decision which was negatively received by critics and fans. On October 31, at Crown Jewel, Rollins lost the Universal Championship to The Fiend in a falls count anywhere match, ending his second reign at 80 days.

==== The Messiah (2019–2020) ====
Rollins was selected as the captain for Team Raw against Team SmackDown and Team NXT on November 24 at Survivor Series, where Team SmackDown emerged victorious. The following night on Raw, Rollins berated the entire Raw roster for "dropping the ball" and failing to win at the pay-per-view. These comments later drew the attention of Kevin Owens, who attacked Rollins and challenged him to a match, which ended in a disqualification after AOP (Akam and Rezar) attacked Owens. On the December 9 episode of Raw, despite earlier denying an alliance with AOP, Rollins joined them by attacking Owens, turning heel for the first time since 2016.

After this, Rollins began calling himself the "Monday Night Messiah" while stating that he was "sacrificing" his opponents for "the greater good" and created a faction with AOP and Buddy Murphy. Rollins and Murphy defeated The Viking Raiders to win the Raw Tag Team Championship on the January 20, 2020, episode of Raw, becoming a six-time champion. Rollins competed in the Royal Rumble on January 26, as the final entrant, but was eliminated by eventual winner Drew McIntyre. Rollins and Murphy retained the titles against The Street Profits at Super ShowDown on February 27, but lost the titles to them on the March 2 episode of Raw. Rollins and Murphy failed to reclaim the championship from the Street Profits at Elimination Chamber six days later. At WrestleMania 36 on April 4, Rollins lost to Owens in No Disqualification match, ending the feud. At Money in the Bank on May 10, Rollins unsuccessfully challenged McIntyre for the WWE Championship.

The next night on Raw, Rollins attacked Rey Mysterio and injured his eye with the steel ring steps. On the May 18 episode of Raw, Rollins recruited Austin Theory as a member of his faction. Mysterio eventually returned and challenged Rollins to an Eye for an Eye match, where the only way to win was to extract the opponent's eyeball. At The Horror Show at Extreme Rules on July 19, Rollins won the match after using the ring steps to remove Mysterio's eye. Over the following weeks, Rey's son Dominik Mysterio confronted Rollins about the attacks on both him and his father. At SummerSlam on August 23, Rollins defeated Dominik in a Street Fight. On August 30, Rollins and Murphy lost to Rey and Dominik Mysterio at Payback.

On the October 5 episode of Raw, Murphy attacked Rollins after he refused to apologize to him, thus ending their alliance. As part of the 2020 WWE draft in October, Rollins was drafted to the SmackDown brand. On the November 20 episode of SmackDown, Rollins lost to Murphy to end the feud. At Survivor Series two days later, Rollins was a part of Team SmackDown, but was the first person eliminated by Sheamus after "sacrificing" himself and his team lost the match.

==== The Visionary (2021–2023) ====
At the Royal Rumble on January 31, 2021, Rollins entered at number 29, but was eliminated by eventual winner Edge. On Night 1 of WrestleMania 37 on April 10, Rollins lost to Cesaro, but won a rematch at Hell in a Cell on June 20. On the July 9 episode of SmackDown, Rollins defeated Cesaro again to qualify for the Money in the Bank ladder match at the titular event on July 18, which was won by Big E. Later that night, Rollins interfered in the main event where Roman Reigns was defending the Universal Championship against Edge, distracting the referee to cost Edge the match. Over the following weeks, Rollins and Edge confronted and attacked each other until the August 6 episode of SmackDown, where Edge challenged Rollins to a match at SummerSlam, which Rollins accepted. At the event on August 21, Rollins lost to Edge by submission, but won their rematch on the September 10 episode of SmackDown. As part of the 2021 Draft, Rollins was drafted to the Raw brand. On the October 8 episode of SmackDown, Edge demanded a Hell in a Cell match between them, which was made official for Crown Jewel. At the event on October 21, Rollins was defeated by Edge, ending their feud. At Survivor Series on November 21, Rollins took part in the 5-on-5 elimination match on Team Raw and won the match as the sole survivor after eliminating Jeff Hardy. On the October 25 episode of Raw, Rollins defeated Finn Bálor, Kevin Owens, and Rey Mysterio in a fatal four-way ladder match to become the number one contender for the WWE Championship against Big E at Day 1 on January 1, 2022. Over the following weeks, Owens and Bobby Lashley were also added to the WWE Championship match at Day 1, making it a fatal four-way match, which Rollins lost after Brock Lesnar was added to the match and won the title. That month, he began to work as Seth "Freakin" Rollins. At Royal Rumble on January 29, Rollins faced SmackDown's Roman Reigns for the Universal Championship, winning the match by disqualification but not the title. On February 18, at Elimination Chamber, he failed to win the WWE Championship inside the namesake structure after being eliminated by Lesnar.

Rollins then unsuccessfully attempted to find a spot on the card at WrestleMania 38, until Mr. McMahon announced that Rollins would face an opponent of his choosing on the March 28 episode of Raw. At Night 1 of WrestleMania on April 2, Rollins' opponent was unveiled as the returning Cody Rhodes, who defeated Rollins. At WrestleMania Backlash on May 8, Rollins lost to Rhodes in a rematch. On the following episode of Raw, Rollins attacked and laid out Rhodes during his match for the United States Championship against Theory. The following week, Rhodes challenged Rollins to a match at Hell in a Cell, inside the namesake structure, which Rollins accepted. At the event on June 5, Rollins lost to Rhodes, ending their feud. Rollins then began a feud with Matt Riddle, setting up a match between the two at SummerSlam. However, the match was postponed after Riddle suffered an injury following an attack by Rollins on the July 25 episode of Raw. Despite this, both Rollins and Riddle appeared at SummerSlam on July 30, engaging in a brawl which saw Rollins come out on top. At Clash at the Castle on September 3, Rollins defeated Riddle. On the September 19 episode of Raw, it was announced that they would have a rematch in a Fight Pit match at Extreme Rules on October 8, where Rollins lost to Riddle by submission.

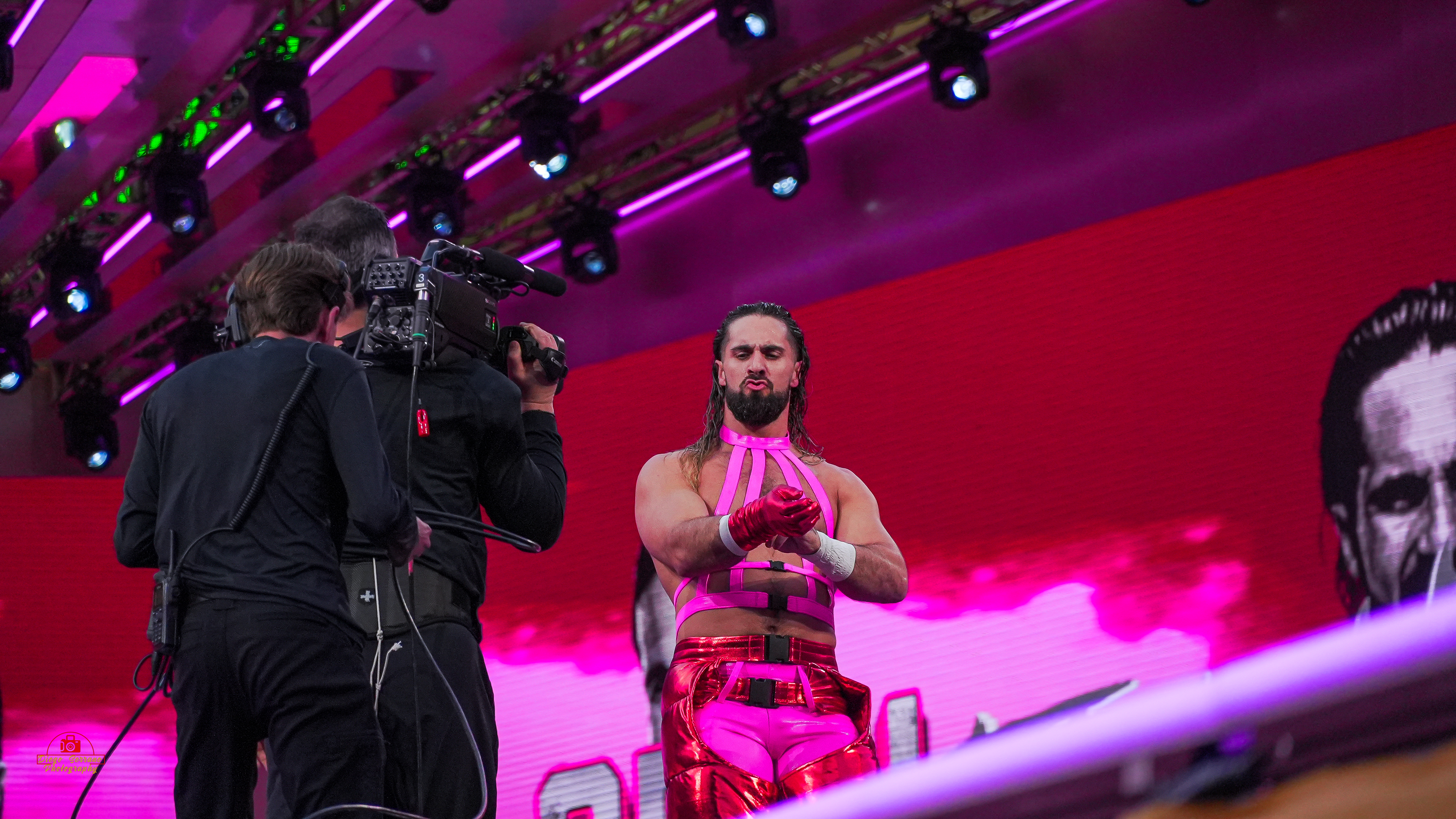
Rollins at Night 1 of WrestleMania 39

Two nights later on Raw, Rollins defeated Bobby Lashley to win his second United States Championship after Brock Lesnar attacked Lashley before the match. This made him the second wrestler (after The Miz) to become a two-time WWE Grand Slam Champion. The following week on Raw, Rollins retained the title against Riddle, ending their feud. On the November 7 episode of Raw, Rollins issued an open challenge that was answered by Lashley, who attacked Rollins before the match. As a result, Mr. Money in the Bank Austin Theory cashed in his contract, however, Rollins retained the title due to interference from Lashley. Rollins then started a feud with Theory, turning face for the first time since 2019. At Survivor Series: WarGames on November 26, Rollins lost the United States Championship to Theory in a triple threat match also involving Lashley, ending his reign at 47 days. On the January 2, 2023, episode of Raw, Rollins failed to regain the title from Theory. On January 28, Rollins entered the Royal Rumble at number 15, but was eliminated by Logan Paul. At Elimination Chamber on February 18, Rollins failed to win the title in an Elimination Chamber match when he was the last person eliminated by Theory after interference from Paul. At Night 1 of WrestleMania 39 on April 1, Rollins defeated Paul. At Backlash on May 6, Rollins defeated Omos.

==== World Heavyweight Champion (2023–2024) ====
On the May 8 episode of Raw, Rollins won the right to compete for the newly established World Heavyweight Championship at Night of Champions by first defeating Damian Priest and Shinsuke Nakamura in a triple threat match, then defeating Finn Bálor, who had won a similar triple threat match. At the event on May 27, Rollins defeated AJ Styles in the tournament final to become the inaugural champion. On the June 5 episode of Raw, Rollins defeated Priest in an open challenge to retain the title. At NXT Gold Rush on June 20, Rollins defeated Bron Breakker to retain the title. On July 1, at Money in the Bank, Rollins successfully defended the title against Bálor after an unintended distraction by Priest, who seemingly had intentions of cashing in his newly won Money in the Bank briefcase, causing the latter to lose the match. At SummerSlam on August 5, Rollins defeated Bálor once again to retain the title. Rollins then entered into a feud with Shinsuke Nakamura, whom he defeated to retain the title on September 2 at Payback and at Fastlane on October 7 in a Last Man Standing match.

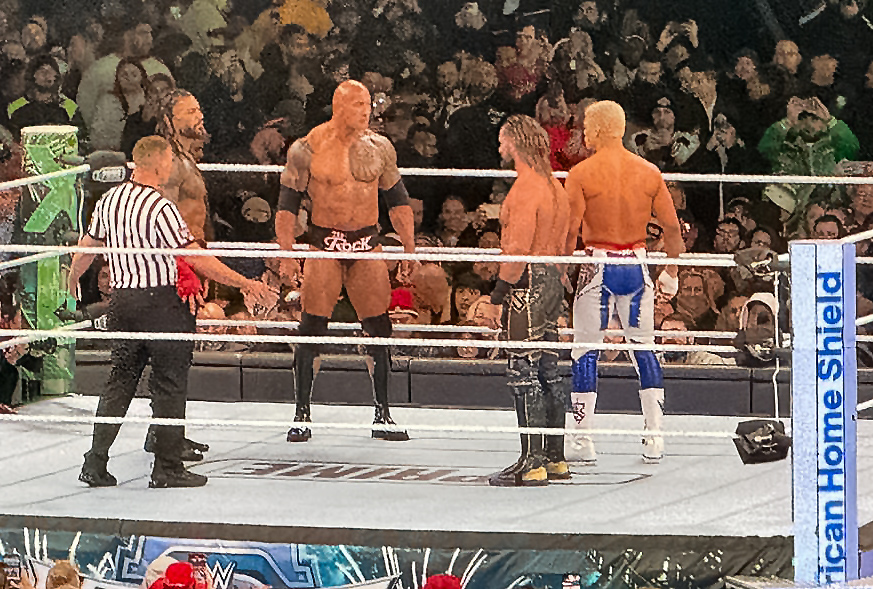
Rollins (second from right) and Cody Rhodes face to face with Roman Reigns and The Rock at Night 1 of WrestleMania XL in April 2024.

At Crown Jewel on November 4, Rollins retained the title against Drew McIntyre. On the November 6 episode of Raw, after retaining the World Heavyweight Championship against Sami Zayn, a brawl ensued between Rollins, Zayn, Cody Rhodes, Jey Uso, and The Judgment Day (Balor, Priest, "Dirty" Dominik Mysterio, and JD McDonagh). Adam Pearce came out to declare a WarGames match between the eight men at Survivor Series. McIntyre was later added to the match, joining forces with The Judgment Day, while a returning Randy Orton joined Rollins' team. At the event on November 25, Rollins' team defeated McIntyre and the Judgment Day. Rollins then retained his title against Uso on the December 4 episode of Raw, McIntyre in a rematch at Day 1 on January 1, 2024, and Jinder Mahal on the January 15 episode of Raw. The following week, Rollins announced that he would be out of action due to an MCL injury. On the March 4 episode of Raw, Rollins announced that he was medically cleared to compete again and would team up with Rhodes against Roman Reigns and The Rock in the main event of Night 1 of WrestleMania XL on April 6, but they were defeated. The next night, Rollins lost the World Heavyweight Championship to McIntyre, ending his reign at 316 days. However, he appeared later that night during the main event to help Rhodes defeat Reigns. After WrestleMania XL, Rollins underwent surgery to repair a torn meniscus in his knee.

After a two-month hiatus, Rollins made a surprise return on the June 17 episode of Raw, where Priest challenged him to a title match, which Rollins accepted and was scheduled for Money in the Bank. The following week, Rollins and Priest agreed to a stipulation for the match; if he lost, he would be unable to challenge Priest for the championship as long as he held it, but if he won, Priest would have to leave The Judgment Day. At the event on July 6, which was made a triple threat match with McIntyre cashing in his newly won Money in the Bank contract, Rollins failed to win the title after Priest pinned McIntyre when CM Punk interfered. On August 3, Rollins refereed the match between Punk and McIntyre at SummerSlam, which the latter won. On the following episode of Raw, Rollins was attacked by "Big" Bronson Reed with six Tsunamis, writing Rollins off television to allow him to recover from chronic injury issues. After a month-long absence, Rollins returned on the September 30 episode of Raw to help Braun Strowman defeat Reed in a Last Monster Standing match. At Crown Jewel on November 2, Rollins defeated Reed.

==== Storyline with The Vision (2025–present) ====
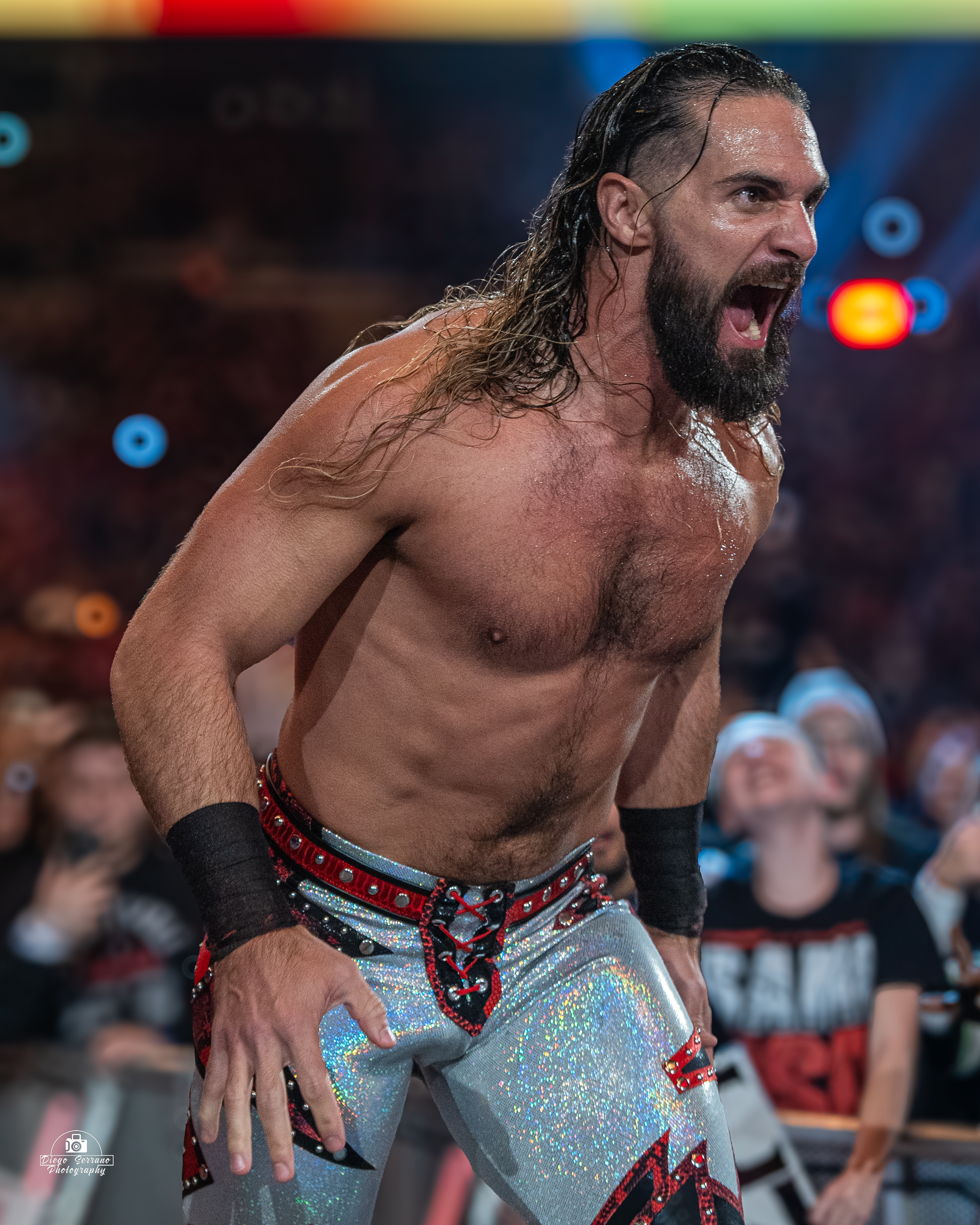
Rollins at the 2025 Royal Rumble

The feud between Rollins and CM Punk culminated on the following episodes of Raw as the two insulted each other before brawling throughout the arena, and then it was announced that Rollins and Punk would face each other on the debut episode of Raw on Netflix. At the Raw premiere on Netflix, on January 6, 2025, Rollins lost to Punk. At Royal Rumble on February 1, Rollins entered the titular match at number 25. As Rollins and Reigns attempted to eliminate each other, both were eliminated from behind by Punk. Rollins then proceeded to attack both Reigns and Punk before storming off. On the February 17 episode of Raw, Rollins defeated Finn Bálor to qualify for the Elimination Chamber match at Elimination Chamber. At the namesake event, he was eliminated by Punk, but caused the latter to be eliminated in turn by John Cena who subsequently won the match. In March 2025, his ringname was reverted to simply Seth Rollins. On the March 10 episode of Raw, Rollins and Punk faced each other in a Steel Cage match, which was won by Rollins after a returning Reigns pulled him out of the cage and attacked Rollins in an act of revenge from the Royal Rumble. On the March 21 episode of SmackDown, a brawl ensued between all three men, with Rollins, Reigns, and Punk pointing at the WrestleMania sign, leading to a triple threat match between the three being made official as the Night 1 main event of WrestleMania 41.

On April 19, Night 1 of WrestleMania 41, Rollins defeated Punk and Reigns with the assistance of Paul Heyman, turning heel for the first time since 2022. On the April 21 episode of Raw, Rollins and Heyman added Bron Breakker to their alliance as the trio stood tall over Punk and Reigns to close the show. On the May 5 episode of Raw, Rollins challenged Jey Uso for the World Heavyweight Championship, winning the match via disqualification after being attacked by Punk. However, since titles do not change hands via disqualification or countout unless stipulated, Uso remained champion. On May 24 at Saturday Night's Main Event XXXIX, Rollins and Breakker defeated Punk and Sami Zayn after interference from Bronson Reed, who later joined their alliance. At Money in the Bank on June 7, Rollins won the men's Money in the Bank ladder match after interference from Breakker and Reed. With this victory, Rollins became the second male wrestler, after Punk to win the ladder match more than once and the fourth wrestler overall to hold the contract more than once. On July 12 at Saturday Night's Main Event XL, Rollins was defeated by LA Knight. During the match, Rollins suffered a seemingly legitimate knee injury in what was later revealed to be a worked shoot. On August 2, Night 1 of SummerSlam, Rollins returned from injury and cashed in his Money in the Bank contract on CM Punk to win the World Heavyweight Championship for a second time. On the August 4 episode of Raw, Rollins successfully defended the title against LA Knight via disqualification thanks to attack by CM Punk, the alliance of Rollins, Breakker, Reed, and Heyman was officially given the name of "The Vision". At Clash in Paris on August 31, Rollins successfully defended the title against Knight, Punk and Uso in a fatal four-way match after an assist from his real life wife Becky Lynch. At Wrestlepalooza on September 20, he teamed with Lynch in a losing effort against Punk and his wife AJ Lee in a mixed tag team match.

At Crown Jewel: Perth on October 11, Rollins defeated Cody Rhodes (SmackDown's Undisputed WWE Champion) to win the Crown Jewel Championship. Two days later on Raw, Breakker and Reed attacked Rollins, exiling Rollins from the stable. This was done to write Rollins off television due to a legitimate shoulder injury he sustained at Crown Jewel. Rollins was subsequently forced to vacate the title the following week, ending his second reign at 79 days. It was announced that the shoulder injury would take Rollins out of action for six months. During his hiatus, Logan Paul and Austin Theory joined The Vision, and both Breakker and Reed suffered injuries. At Elimination Chamber on February 28, 2026, Rollins returned by attacking Paul during the Elimination Chamber match, and revealing himself as the masked man who has been attacking The Vision for weeks, turning face in the process. At Wrestlemania 42 Night 1 on April 18, Rollins lost to Gunther after interference from a returning Bron Breakker. At Backlash on May 9, Rollins lost to Breakker after interference from The Vision. At Night of Champions on June 27, Rollins defeated Breakker in a steel cage match, ending their feud. At Night 2 of SummerSlam on August 2, Rollins was unsuccessful in capturing the World Heavyweight Championship from Reigns, after the match Rollins and Reigns showed respect to one another by doing their signature Shield fist bump, ending their 12-year rivalry.

== Professional wrestling style and persona ==
Rollins performing the Stomp on Baron Corbin

Lopez's WWE ring surname is a tribute to singer Henry Rollins. His finisher during his time in FCW was a superkick to a kneeling opponent's head called Avada Kedavra, named after a magic spell that kills people in Harry Potter. For most of his WWE career, he has used the Curb Stomp as a finishing move; he also used it during his pre-WWE days as Tyler Black, where it was called the Blackout. The move was banned by WWE from March 2015 to January 2018, as then-chairman Vince McMahon thought it looked "too cruel". During this time, Rollins used the Pedigree and a jumping knee strike called the Ripcord Knee (and briefly King's Landing) as finishing moves. The move has been simply referred to as the Stomp since its return, partially to avoid an association with the real-life attack.

Rollins' character throughout his time as a member of The Shield was that of an "out-spoken hot-head who will do crazy things" to help the team, though his methodical approach to their matches earned him the nickname of "The Architect". Following his turn into a villainous character and the team's initial split, he began claiming that he played the single most important role in forming The Shield, referring to himself as the group's creator and emphasizing his "Architect" nickname. In late 2019, after turning into a different kind of villainous character and aligning himself with the AOP, he began to dub himself the "Monday Night Messiah" and compare himself to Jesus while debuting a new entrance song. He also began recruiting new "disciples" into his group, such as Murphy and Austin Theory, while proclaiming himself to be their leader and savior. From 2022 to 2025, he added "Freakin" to his ring name as a way of emphasizing his importance and adopted a persona nicknamed "The Visionary", a boastful and delusional egomaniac with an eccentric personality and outlandish fashion sense.

== Personal life ==
Lopez began dating Irish professional wrestler Rebecca Quin, better known as Becky Lynch, in January 2019. They have one daughter, born in December 2020. They were married on June 29, 2021. They live in Moline, Illinois and Los Angeles, California.

On February 9, 2015, a nude photo of former NXT wrestler Zahra Schreiber, who reportedly was Lopez's girlfriend, was posted to his social media accounts, the contents of which are automatically republished by WWE.com. Soon after, nude photos of Lopez were posted on the Twitter page of his then-fiancée Leighla Schultz. In response, Lopez apologized for "private photographs that were distributed without [his] consent". On February 25, 2016, Lopez broke up with Schreiber. The incident was covered in mainstream media, although it was reported at the time that it did not result in any reported backstage issues or disciplinary repercussions for Rollins.

Lopez as a passionate Chicago Bears fan and has become a regular media personality for the National Football League, specifically joining the NFL Network's Good Morning Football (GMFB) as a guest host. He contributes as an analyst, makes draft picks and appears on shows like the like The Rich Eisen Show to discuss football. He is represented by Bryan Diperstein of Adventure Media, who also represents his wife Becky Lynch and other wrestlers as well. Diperstein has facilitated much of Lopez's foray into sports media. In October 2026, it was reported that Lopez had signed a deal with ESPN hat includes a limited number of appearances on Good Morning Football, First Take, Get Up and SportsCenter.

Lopez is also a fan of the St. Louis Cardinals. In 2014, he and his former tag team partner Marek Brave started a Moline-based professional wrestling school called The Black & The Brave Wrestling Academy. In 2019, he opened a coffee shop called 329 Dport in his hometown of Davenport, Iowa.

In 2019, Lopez discovered his half-siblings, a brother named Brandon and a sister named Diandra "Beth" Demi Lopez, through DNA testing facilitated by 23andMe. He reported the discovery via Twitter, crediting his sister for making the initial discovery.

Lopez identifies as an atheist.

== Filmography ==
=== Film ===
Year	Title	Role	Notes
2016	Sharknado: The 4th Awakens	AstroTech Lopez	Film debut
2017	The Jetsons & WWE: Robo-WrestleMania!	Seth Rollins/Reactor Rollins	Voice
2017	Armed Response	Brett	
2019	Trouble	Norm	Voice

=== Television ===
Year	Title	Role	Notes
2015
2015	Extreme Makeover: Weight Loss Edition	Himself	Episode: "Pearls"
2015	Bet		
2025	Bet	Seth Rollins	Episode: "The Speakeasy"

=== Web series ===
Year	Title	Role	Notes
2015	Smosh Games	Himself	1 episode
2016	Superstar Ink	Himself	1 episode
2015–2023	UpUpDownDown	Himself/The Champ	Regular appearances
2017	Southpaw Regional Wrestling	"Dry Rub" Doug	

=== Video games ===
Year	Title	Notes
2013	WWE 2K14	Video game debut
2014	WWE 2K15	Motion capture (Next-gen & PC)
2014	WWE SuperCard	Latest Card: SS '20
2015	WWE 2K16	Motion capture (Next-gen & PC)
2015	WWE Immortals	
2016	WWE 2K17	Motion capture (Next-gen & PC)
2017	WWE: Champions	
2017	WWE Mayhem	
2017	WWE 2K18	Cover athlete
2018	WWE 2K19	Motion capture
2019	WWE 2K20	Motion capture
2020	The King of Fighters All Star	
2020	WWE Racing Showdown	
2020	WWE 2K Battlegrounds	
2022	WWE 2K22	
2023	WWE 2K23	
2024	WWE 2K24	
2025	WWE 2K25	
2026	WWE 2K26	

== Championships and accomplishments ==
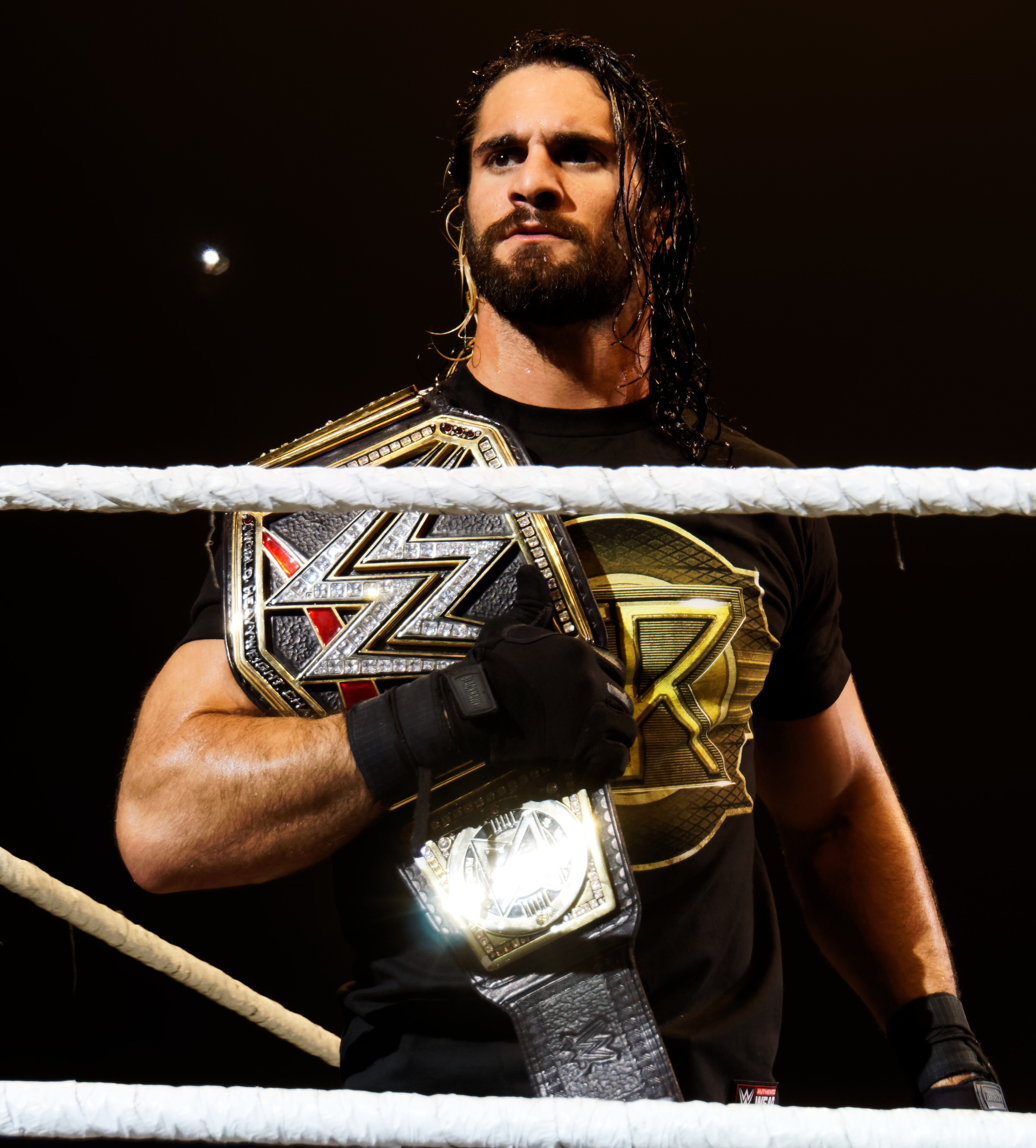
Rollins is a two-time WWE Champion...

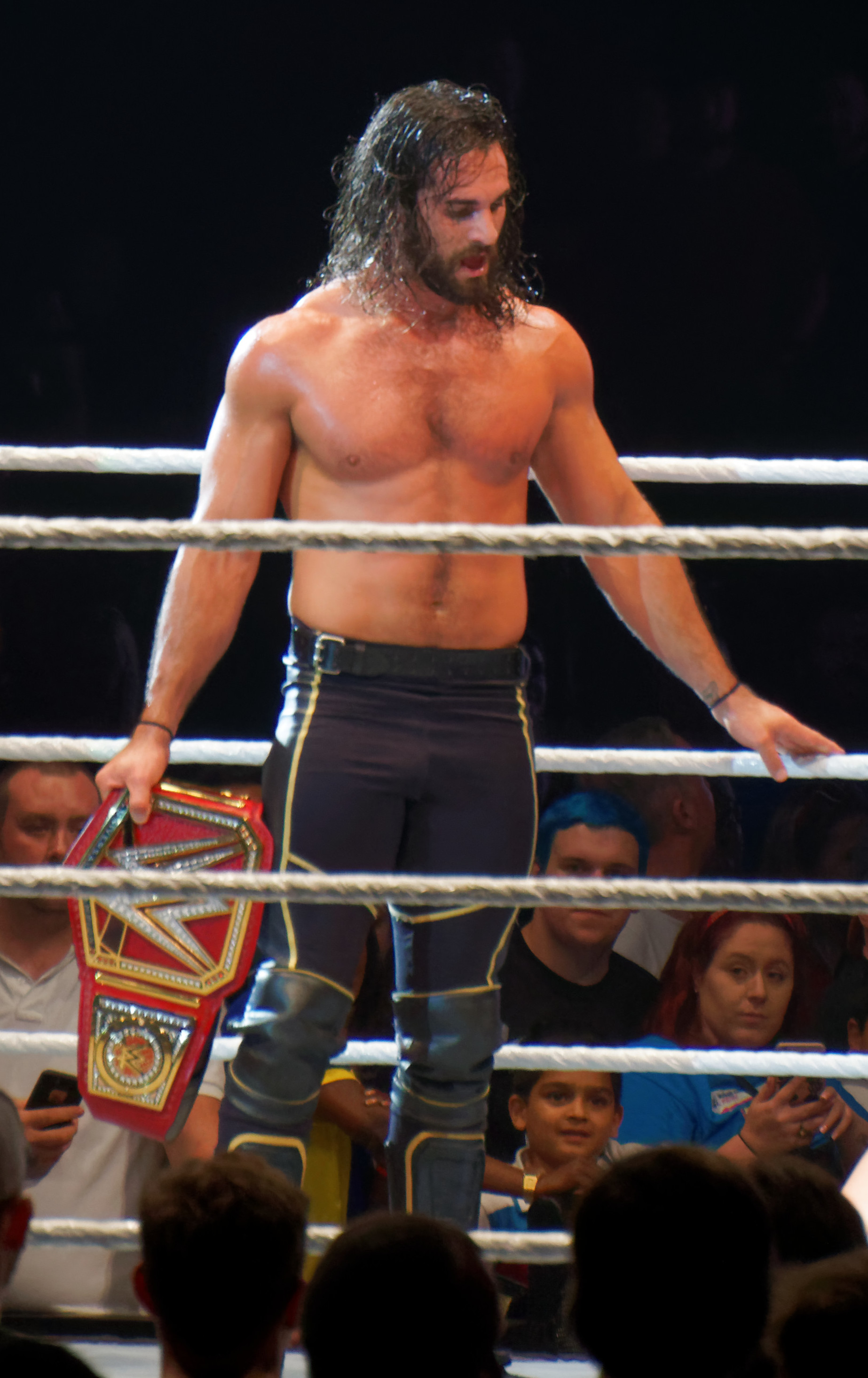
... a two-time WWE Universal Champion...

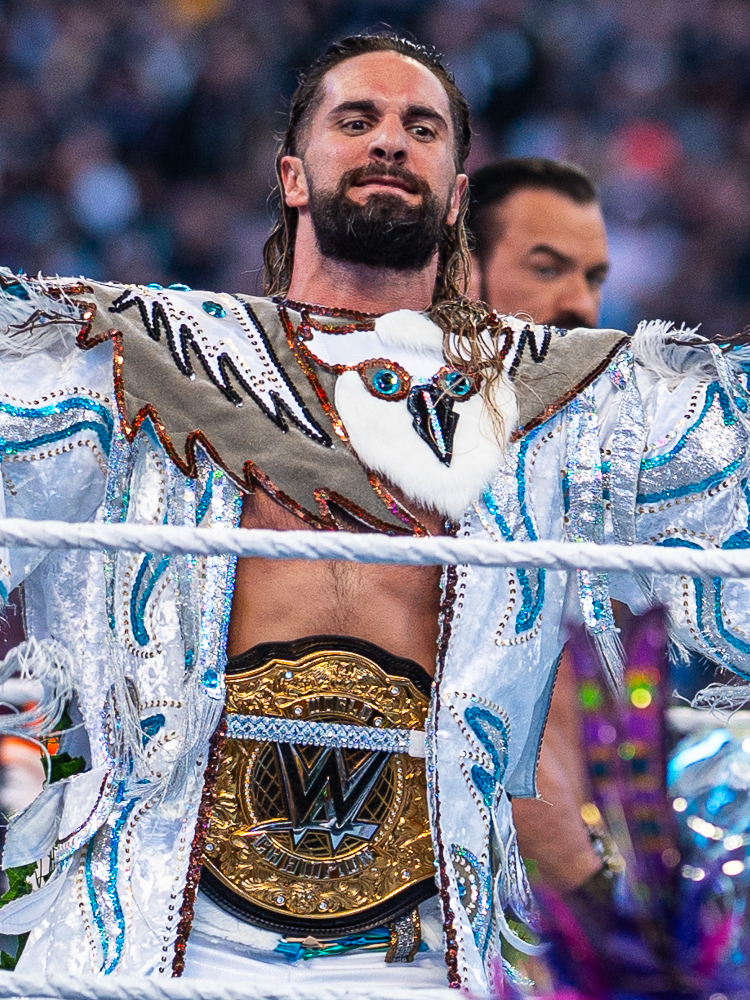
... and a two-time and inaugural World Heavyweight Champion, making him a six-time world champion all totaled in WWE.

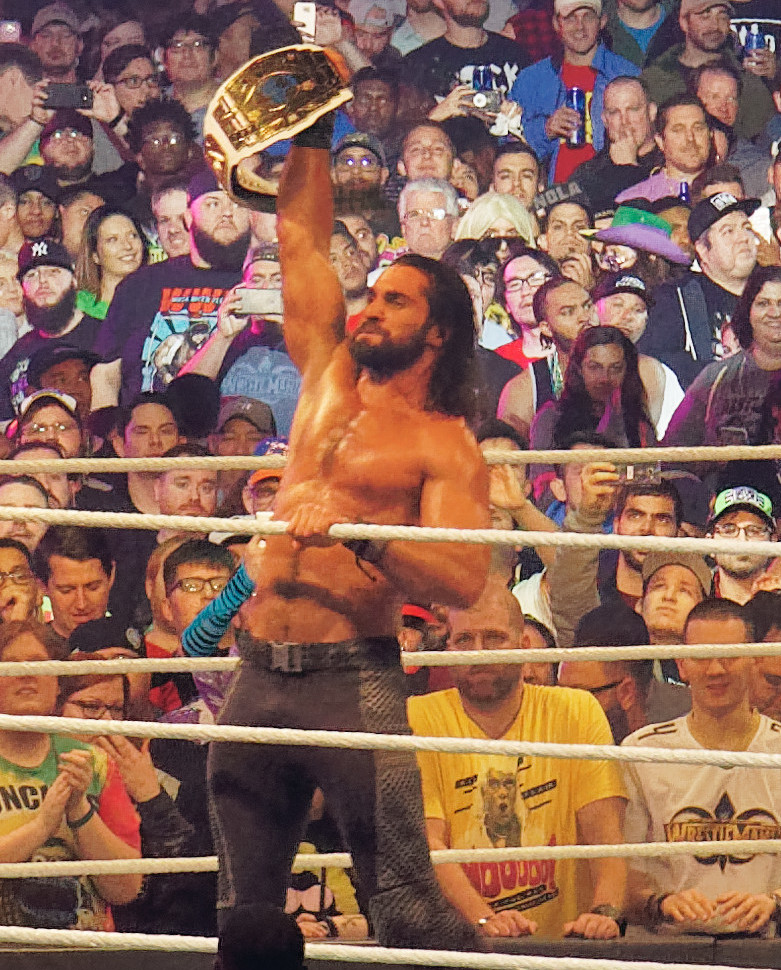
Rollins is also a two-time WWE Intercontinental Champion...

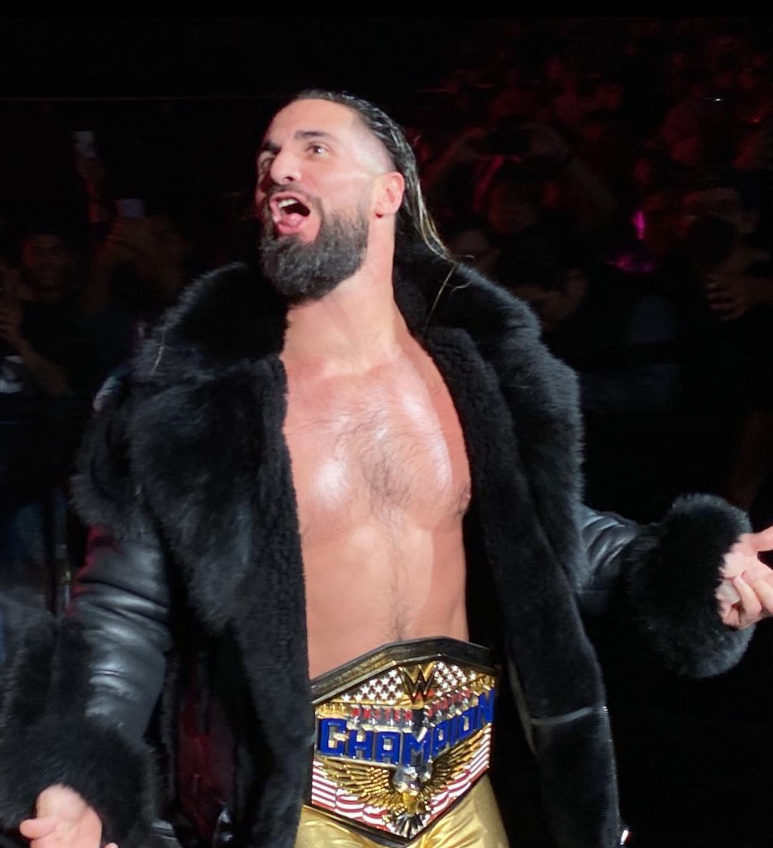
....a two-time WWE United States Champion.

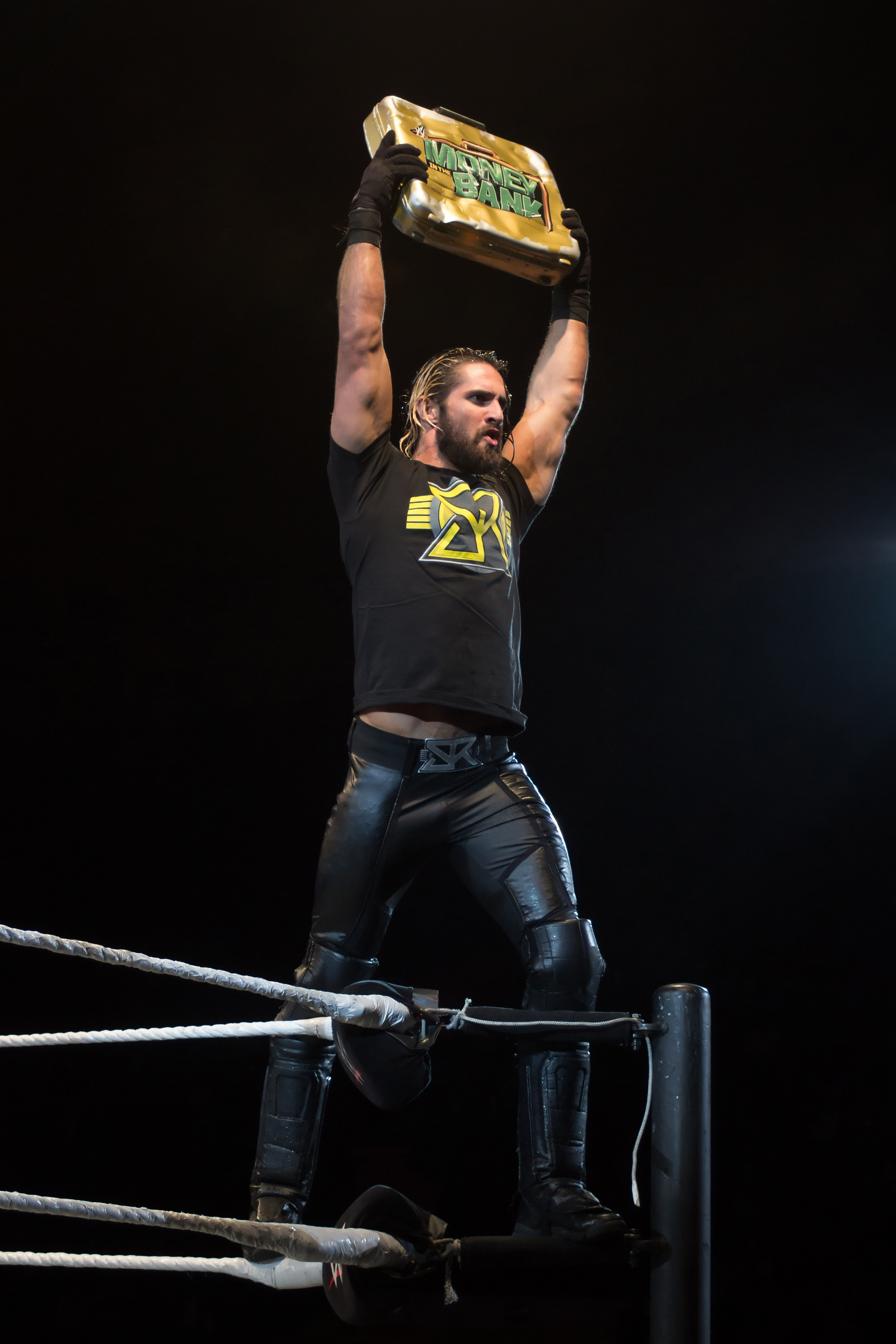
...and a two-time Money in the Bank ladder match winner (2014 and 2025)

- Absolute Intense Wrestling
  - AIW Intense Championship (1 time)
- All American Wrestling
  - AAW Heavyweight Championship (2 times)
  - AAW Tag Team Championship (2 times) – with Marek Brave (1) and Jimmy Jacobs (1)
- Florida Championship Wrestling
  - FCW Florida Heavyweight Championship (1 time)
  - FCW Jack Brisco 15 Championship (1 time)
  - FCW Florida Tag Team Championship (1 time) – with Richie Steamboat
  - Jack Brisco Classic (2011)
  - First FCW Grand Slam Champion
- Full Impact Pro
  - FIP World Heavyweight Championship (1 time)
- Independent Wrestling Association Mid-South
  - IWA Mid-South Light Heavyweight Championship (1 time)
- Mr. Chainsaw Productions Wrestling
  - MCPW World Heavyweight Championship (1 time)
- NWA Midwest
  - NWA Midwest Tag Team Championship (1 time) – with Marek Brave
- New York Post
  - Match of the Year (2022) vs. Cody Rhodes at Hell in a Cell
- Pro Wrestling Guerrilla
  - PWG World Tag Team Championship (1 time) – with Jimmy Jacobs
- Pro Wrestling Illustrated
  - Feud of the Year (2014) vs. Dean Ambrose
  - Feud of the Year (2025) vs. CM Punk
  - Match of the Year (2022) – vs. Cody Rhodes on June 5
  - Most Hated Wrestler of the Year (2015, 2020)
  - Tag Team of the Year (2013) with Roman Reigns
  - Wrestler of the Year (2015, 2023)
  - Ranked No. 1 of the top 500 singles wrestlers in the PWI 500 in 2015, 2019, and 2023
- Ring of Honor
  - ROH World Championship (1 time)
  - ROH World Tag Team Championship (2 times) – with Jimmy Jacobs
  - ROH World Championship No. 1 Contender Tournament (2008)
  - ROH World Tag Team Championship Tournament (2008) – with Jimmy Jacobs
  - Survival of the Fittest (2009)
- Rolling Stone
  - Best Briefly Resuscitated Storyline (2015) vs. Dean Ambrose
  - Most Puzzling New Finisher (2015) Pedigree
  - Most Smothered In-Ring Potential (2014)
  - Ranked No. 9 of the 10 best WWE wrestlers of 2016
- Sports Illustrated
  - Ranked No. 3 of the top 10 men's wrestlers in 2018
  - Wrestler of the Year (2022)
- Wrestling Observer Newsletter
  - Tag Team of the Year (2013) with Roman Reigns
  - Worst Feud of the Year (2013) – as part of The Authority vs. Big Show
  - Worst Feud of the Year (2019) vs. "The Fiend" Bray Wyatt
  - Worst Match of the Year (2019) vs. "The Fiend" Bray Wyatt at Hell in a Cell
- WWE
  - WWE Championship (2 times)
  - World Heavyweight Championship (2 times, inaugural)
  - WWE Universal Championship (2 times)
  - NXT Championship (1 time, inaugural)
  - WWE Intercontinental Championship (2 times)
  - WWE United States Championship (2 times)
  - WWE Crown Jewel Championship (2025)
  - WWE Raw Tag Team Championship (6 times) – with Roman Reigns (1), Dean Ambrose (2), Jason Jordan (1), Braun Strowman (1), and Buddy Murphy/Murphy (1)
  - Money in the Bank (2014, 2025)
  - Men's Royal Rumble (2019)
  - World Heavyweight Championship Tournament (2023)
  - Gold Rush Tournament (2012)
  - 29th Triple Crown Champion
  - A two-time and 11th Grand Slam Champion (under current format; 19th overall)
  - Second two-time Grand Slam Champion
  - Slammy Award (10 times)
    - Anti-Gravity Moment of the Year (2014) Diving off the balcony at Payback
    - Breakout Star of the Year (2013) with Dean Ambrose and Roman Reigns as The Shield
    - Double-Cross of the Year (2014) Betraying The Shield and joining The Authority
    - Faction of the Year (2013, 2014) with Dean Ambrose and Roman Reigns as The Shield
    - Fan Participation (2014) "You Sold Out"
    - Match of the Year (2014) Team Cena vs. Team Authority at Survivor Series
    - Rizzie of the Year (2024)
    - Superstar of the Year (2015)
    - Trending Now (Hashtag) of the Year (2013) – #BelieveInTheShield with Dean Ambrose and Roman Reigns as The Shield
  - WWE Year-End Award for Best Reunion (2018) – as part of The Shield
  - Bumpy Award (1 time)
    - Best Dressed of the Half-Year (2021) – with Sonya Deville
