= Mo Gallini =

American actor (born 1966)

- Born: Mohamed Ghalayini; February 15, 1966 (age 60); Miami, Florida, United States
- Education: University of Florida
- Occupation: Actor
- Years active: 1993–present
- Website: www.mogallini.com

Mohamed Ghalayini (born February 15, 1966) is an American film and television actor, known by his stage name Mo Gallini.

== Biography ==
Gallini was born Mohamed Ghalayini on February 15, 1966, in Miami, Florida. His father was from Lebanon, and his mother was of Cuban descent. He attended the University of Florida from 1983 to 1985 before moving to Los Angeles with his family. After moving, Gallini met director David Anspaugh, who offered him his first role as a Notre Dame football player in the 1993 film Rudy. Gallini has portrayed over fifty characters in television and film, including the roles of Enrique in 2 Fast 2 Furious (as "Matt Gallini"), Abdul Manesh on the fourth season of the hit series 24, and Interrogator in Seal Team Six: The Raid on Osama Bin Laden. He was awarded Best Supporting Actor honors at the 2008 BendFilm Festival for his portrayal of identity thief Wesley Stone in Selfless. Gallini appeared in the recurring role of firefighter Jose Vargas in season 1 of the NBC television series Chicago Fire.

== Filmography ==
Year	Title	Role	Notes
1993	Rudy	Notre Dame Football Player	
1994	Seinfeld	Tough Guy	One episode; as Matt Gallini
1995	Crimson Tide	Seaman Kuhne	
1995	Land's End	Tomas	One episode; as Matt Gallini
1995	Powderburn	Rick	as Matt Gallini
1996	The Rockford Files: Friends and Foul Play	Nicky Z	as Matt Gallini
1996–2001	NYPD Blue	INS Agent Mike Torres/Jay Dolinky	Two episodes; as Matt Gallini
1997	Flipping	Ray-Ray's Friend #2	as Matt Gallini
1997	Melrose Place	Burt	One episode; as Matt Gallini
1997	Profiler	Atlanta Cop	One episode; as Matt Gallini
1997	Brooklyn South	Third Killer	One episode; as Matt Gallini
1997	Alien Avengers	Alley Hood #1	as Matt Gallini
1998	Mike Hammer, Private Eye	Robo Baroni	Two episodes; as Matt Gallini
1998	Poodle Springs	J.D.	as Matt Gallini
1998	Beverly Hills, 90210	Repo Man	One episode; as Matt Gallini
1999	Babylon 5: A Call to Arms	Rolf	as Matt Gallini
1999	The X-Files	Hood	Episode; "Tithonus" as Matt Gallini
1999	Clubland	Henchman #1	as Matt Gallini
1999	End of Days	Monk	as Matt Gallini
1999–2002	V.I.P.	Hoag/Drug Dealer #1	Two episodes; as Matt Gallini
2000	Yup Yup Man	Boxer	as Matt Gallini
2000	A Better Way to Die	Laslov	as Matt Gallini
2000	JAG	Mustafa Al-Jimri	One episode; as Matt Gallini
2001	General Hospital	Wes	Three episodes; as Matt Gallini
2001	Nash Bridges	Tucker Kite	One episode; as Matt Gallini
2001	Mulholland Drive	Castigliane Limo Driver	as Matt Gallini
2001	The District	Tony Enzo	One episode; as Matt Gallini
2002	You Got Nothin'	Javier	as Matt Gallini
2002	Warrior	Chavez	as Matt Gallini
2002	Father Lefty		as Matt Gallini
2003	2 Fast 2 Furious	Enrique	as Matt Gallini
2005	24	Abdul Mahnesh	Three episodes; as Matt Gallini
2006	07	Al	Short; as Matt Gallini
2007	Shark	Theo Samaha	
2007	NCIS	Andre Jones	One episode
2007	Rabia	Wafiq	Short
2008	Drillbit Taylor	Male Police Officer on Bluff	as Matt 'Mo' Gallini
2008	Marco Polo	Marco Polo 2000's	
2008	East L.A.	Victor Guzman	
2008	ER	Guy	One episode
2008	Legacy	Suhart	as Matt Gallini
2008	Get Smart	Drug Lord	
2008	Selfless	Wesley Stone	won Best Supporting Actor at 2008 BendFilm Festival
2008	Cinco de Mayo	Raul	Short
2009	Fuel	Coach Marquez	
2009	Majestic and the Masked Man	Santiago Marquez/El Lobo	Short
2010	Weeds	Daniel	One episode
2010	CSI: NY	Mitch Barrett	One episode
2010	Los Angeles	Toupe	
2011	Chase	Hector Torres	Two episodes
2011	NCIS: Los Angeles	Boss	One episode
2011	In My Pocket	Tony Eyebrow	
2011	Deadline	Sy	
2012	Treasure Buddies	Tarik	
2012	Seal Team Six: The Raid on Osama Bin Laden	Interrogator	
2012	Chicago Fire	Jose Vargas	Eight episodes
2013	Lurid	Detective Vasquez	
2013	Toxin	Sanchez	
2015	Murder in Mexico: The Bruce Beresford-Redman Story	Detective Salazar	Television film
2017	Armed Response	Ahmadi	
2017	Chernobyl: Zone of Exclusion	Jesus	
2019	MacGyver	Daris	
2019	Bluff City Law	Edgar Soriano	
2022	Panhandle	Alejandro Perez	Recurring role (5 episodes)
2023	The Out-Laws	Boris	Post-production
