= Armed Response (2017 film) =

- Promotional release poster
- Directed by: John Stockwell
- Written by: Matt Savelloni
- Produced by: Michael J. Luisi; Gene Simmons; Wesley Snipes
- Starring: Wesley Snipes; Anne Heche; Dave Annable; Seth Rollins; Gene Simmons; Mo Gallini
- Cinematography: Matthew Irving
- Edited by: Christopher S. Capp
- Music by: Elia Cmíral
- Production companies: WWE Studios; Erebus Pictures; Voltage Pictures; Maandi Films
- Distributed by: Saban Films
- Release date: August 4, 2017
- Running time: 93 minutes
- Country: United States
- Language: English
- Box office: $52,036

Armed Response is a 2017 American action-horror film directed by John Stockwell and starring Wesley Snipes, who also served as a producer. Anne Heche, Dave Annable and Seth Rollins co-star. Armed Response was produced by Erebus Pictures, a collaboration between WWE Studios and Gene Simmons.

== Plot ==
A team of trained operatives are sent to a prison facility to investigate the disappearance of another covert operations unit. Shortly after arriving, they discover the bodies of the previous team, and then find themselves trapped in a lockdown. They watch surveillance footage of the soldiers who preceded them being killed by unseen assailants. Soon, they experience strange and horrific phenomena as they begin to be slain as well.

The building is a highly evolved artificial intelligence named Temple, which is, in effect, a huge lie detector. Both of the units sent to the prison had previously served in Afghanistan, and were involved in the massacre of a village. Temple is trying to expose the incident and punish those responsible.

== Cast ==
- Wesley Snipes as Isaac
- Anne Heche as Riley
- Dave Annable as Gabriel
- Seth Rollins as Brett
- Kyle Clements as Tyler
- Morgan Roberts as Paul
- Eyas Younis as Saeed Refai
- Mo Gallini as Feruz Ahmadi
- Mike Seal as Rainier
- Gene Simmons as Male Suspect
- Cailey Fleming as Danielle

== Release ==
Armed Response was released in the United States on August 4, 2017.

== Reception ==
=== Critical response ===
On Rotten Tomatoes the film has a 0% score based on reviews from 12 critics.
