= Gallus (professional wrestling) =

Professional wrestling stable

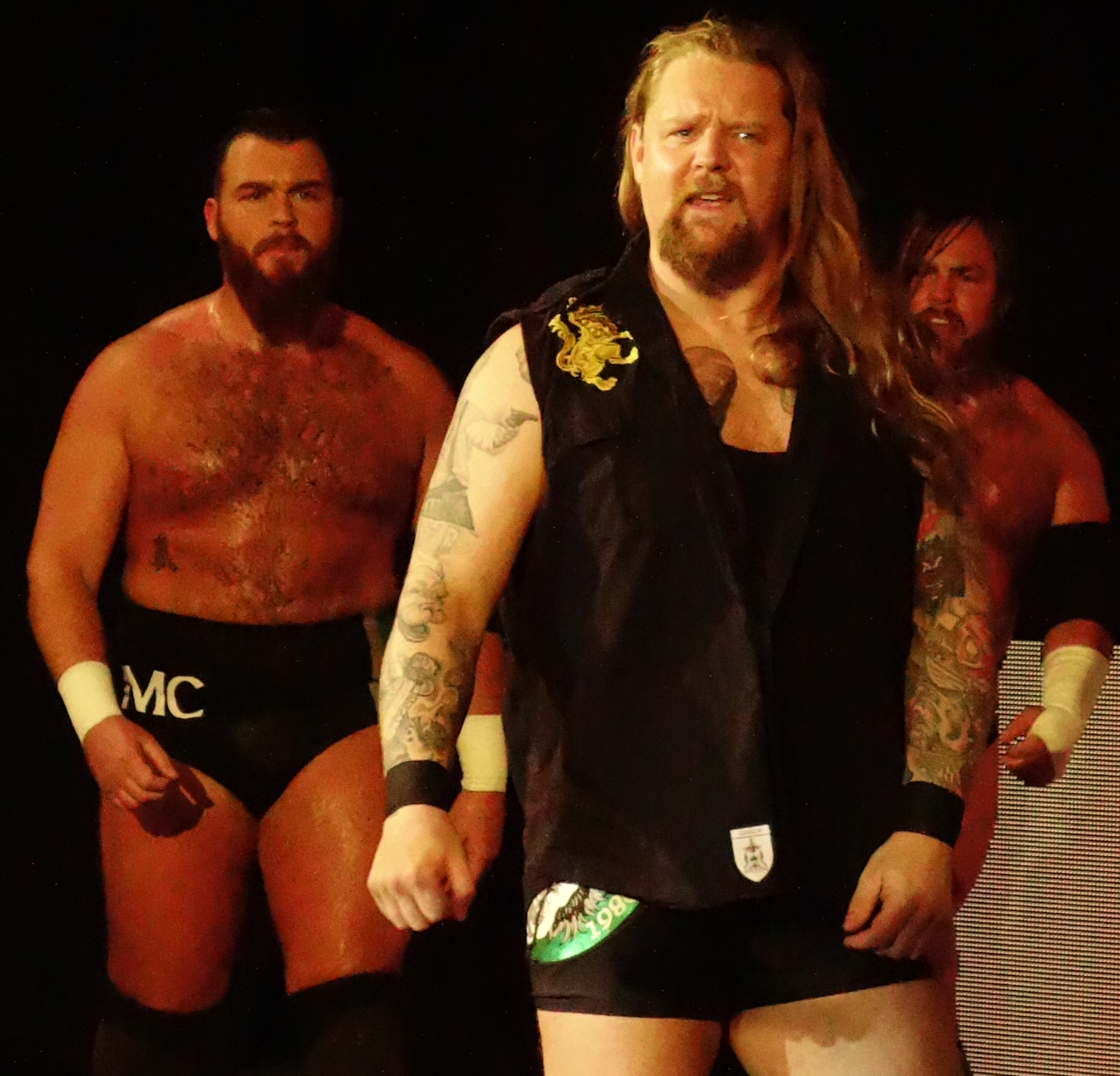
- Gallus (from left to right: Mark Coffey, Wolfgang, and Joe Coffey) in April 2019

Stable
- Name(s): Gallus; Ghalus; Glasgow Boys On Top (GBOT)
- Leader: Joe Coffey
- Members: Mark Coffey; Wolfgang
- Billed heights: Joe: 5 ft 11 in (1.80 m); Mark: 6 ft 2 in (1.88 m); Wolfgang: 6 ft 1 in (1.85 m)
- Combined billed weight: 732 lb (332 kg)
- Debut: 5 December 2018
- Years active: 2018–present

Glasgow Boys On Top (GBOT) are a Scottish villainous professional wrestling stable consisting of Wolfgang and real-life brothers Joe Coffey and Mark Coffey. They are signed to Major League Wrestling (MLW), where Joe is a former one-time MLW Southern Crown Champion. They are best known for their time in WWE from 2018 to 2025, where they performed as Gallus.

== History ==
=== WWE (2018–2025) ===
==== NXT UK (2018–2022) ====
On the 5 December show of NXT UK, the trio of the Coffey brothers and Wolfgang was officially dubbed Gallus (Scottish slang for daring or confident) in a segment calling out British Strong Style, as well as Travis Banks.

Gallus debuted in the 12 December 2018 show of NXT UK, with members Mark Coffey and Wolfgang defeating Ashton Smith & Ligero in a tag match.

On the 4 October 2019 episode of NXT UK, Mark and Wolfgang beat previous champions Mark Andrews and Flash Morgan Webster for the NXT UK Tag Team Championship, going on to hold it for 497 days.

After going on a hiatus for a short time, during which Joe Coffey was suspended by WWE due to sexual harassment allegations.

After Gallus returned, Mark Coffey won the NXT UK Heritage Cup Championship on the 23 June 2022 show of NXT UK; but Wolfgang lost to Ilja Dragunov for the NXT UK Championship on 23 July 2022.

==== NXT (2022–2025) ====
At NXT Heatwave, Gallus debuted on NXT attacking Diamond Mine. On 23 August 2022, Gallus debuted in a tag team match on NXT facing NXT UK Tag Team Champions Brooks Jensen & Josh Briggs, which they would go on to win via countout. At Worlds Collide, Gallus became the second team eliminated from the Fatal 4-way tag team elimination match for the NXT and NXT UK Tag Team Championship. Gallus will go on to have a rivalry with Josh Briggs and Brooks Jensen, with the latter winning a No Disqualification tag team match between the teams. Gallus then later was suspended in September for attacking officials.

At New Year’s Evil on 10 January 2023, Gallus returned from their suspension and won a gauntlet match to become the #1 contenders for the NXT Tag Team Championship, which they won on Vengeance Day the month after. On the 14 March show of NXT, Gallus retained their titles against Pretty Deadly. At NXT Stand & Deliver, Gallus defeated the Creed Brothers & The Family to retain the tag titles with help from a returning Joe Coffey. Gallus would defend against the Creeds and The Dyad in the next months including a triple-threat on the 14 April show of NXT & against the Creeds at NXT Battleground. At NXT Gold Rush, Gallus defeated Malik Blade and Edris Enofe. At NXT: The Great American Bash, Gallus lost the NXT Tag Team Championship to Tony D'Angelo and Channing "Stacks" Lorenzo, ending their reign at 176 days. In April 2024, ESPN reported that Gallus helped train The Rock for his tag team match with Undisputed WWE Universal Champion Roman Reigns against Cody Rhodes and World Heavyweight Champion Seth "Freakin" Rollins at Night 1 of WrestleMania XL. On the May 14, 2024 show of NXT, and as the show was going off the air, the cameras went backstage, showing Wes Lee, Josh Briggs & Ivar assaulted backstage. The attackers were then revealed to be Gallus, making their first televised appearance on NXT since the February 13, 2024 show of NXT. On Week 1 of Great American Bash, they attacked Joe Hendry during his concert. On Week 2, Joe Coffey faced Hendry in a losing effort. On a show of TNA, Wolfgang wrestled against Hendry in another losing effort. On May 2, 2025, all members of Gallus were released from WWE, ending their seven-year tenure with the company.

=== Major League Wrestling (2026–present) ===
In March of 2026, Joe, Mark, and Wolfgang signed a contract with Major League Wrestling, working as Glasgow Boys On Top (GBOT). On June 13 at an MLW Fusion taping, Joe defeated Trevor Lee to win the MLW Southern Crown Championship, but lost the title on October 3 at Slaughterhouse to LaBron Kozone. From September 12 till October 15, GBOT participated in the 2026 Opera Cup, with Joe, Wolfgang, and Mark all being knocked out in the first round by LaBron Kozone, Big Damo, and Matt Riddle, respectively. On November 7 at Saturday Night SuperFight, Joe and Mark failed to win the MLW World Tag Team Championship from The Good Brothers (Doc Gallows and Karl Anderson).

== Championships and accomplishments ==
- Major League Wrestling
  - MLW Southern Crown Championship (1 time) – Joe Coffey
- Pro Wrestling Illustrated
  - Ranked No. 171 of the top 500 singles wrestlers in the PWI 500 in 2019 – Joe Coffey
  - Ranked No. 203 of the top 500 singles wrestlers in the PWI 500 in 2019 – Mark Coffey
  - Ranked No. 178 of the top 500 singles wrestlers in the PWI 500 in 2019 – Wolfgang
- Insane Championship Wrestling
  - ICW Zero-G Championship (1 time, current) – Wolfgang
- WWE
  - NXT Tag Team Championship (1 time) – Mark Coffey and Wolfgang
  - NXT UK Tag Team Championship (1 time) – Mark Coffey and Wolfgang
  - NXT UK Heritage Cup Championship (1 time) – Mark Coffey
