= Moustache Mountain =

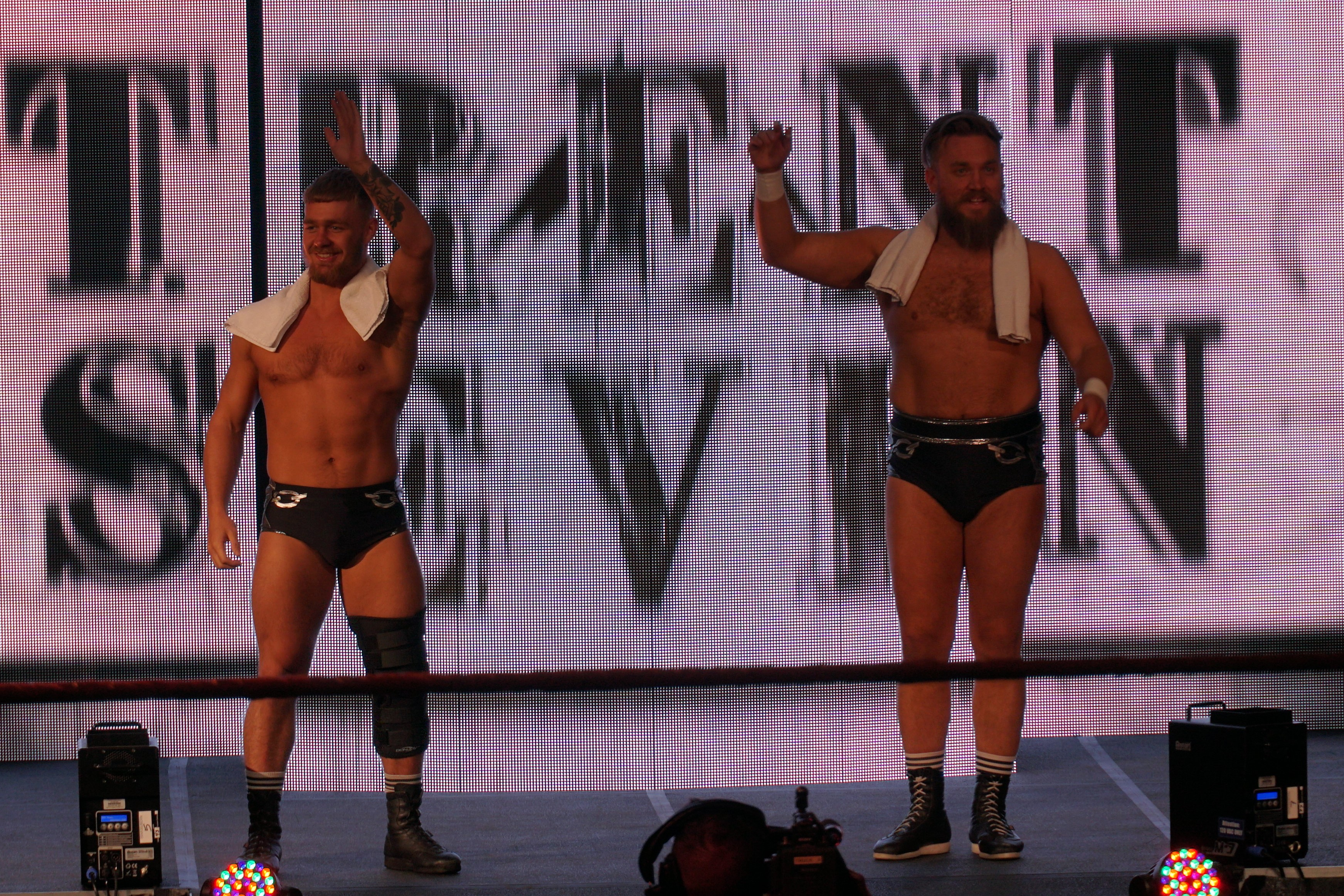
- Bate (left) and Seven (right) at WrestleMania Axxess in April 2018

Tag team
- Members: Trent Seven; Tyler Bate
- Name(s): British Strong Style; Moustache Mountain
- Billed heights: Seven: 1.83 m (6 ft 0 in); Bate: 1.70 m (5 ft 7 in)
- Combined billed weight: 383 lb (174 kg)
- Debut: 3 April 2015
- Disbanded: 16 June 2022
- Years active: 2015–2022

Moustache Mountain was a British professional wrestling tag team consisting of Trent Seven and Tyler Bate. They are one-time NXT UK Tag Team Champions and NXT Tag Team Champions. Created in 2015, they previously worked for other promotions, most notably Chikara and Progress Wrestling. They are also known as part of the three-men stable British Strong Style together with Pete Dunne, also in WWE.

The team debuted on 6 February 2015 in the Chikara promotion. Both Seven and Bate signed with WWE in late 2016 to be a part of the first United Kingdom Championship Tournament, which was won by Bate who became the inaugural WWE United Kingdom Champion. Both wrestlers then joined the NXT brand as singles wrestler, while continuing to team up outside WWE; after Bate lost the title to Dunne in 2017, Moustache Mountain made their debut in WWE the following year, and defeated The Undisputed Era at the NXT U.K. Championship event to win the NXT Tag Team Championship, although they lost it back to The Undisputed Era two days later on NXT. After signing a full-time contract with WWE, the two, together with Dunne, became central figures of NXT UK after its premiere in 2018, unsuccessfully trying to become the inaugural NXT UK Tag Team Champions at NXT UK TakeOver: Blackpool; they would eventually win the titles on 9 December 2021, making them the first individuals to win both the NXT and NXT UK Tag Team Championships.

== Career ==
=== Chikara (2015–2016) ===
In early 2015, Bate and Seven, debuted in the American promotion Chikara as part of their tour of the United Kingdom, teaming up to defeat The Hunter Brothers (Jim Hunter and Lee Hunter) in a dark match on 3 April. and losing to the Devastation Corporation (Max Smashmaster and Blaster McMassive) in another dark match on 6 April. In their final dark match on the tour, Seven and Bate teamed with Clint Margera to take on Pete Dunne, Damian Dunne and Jimmy Havoc in a losing effort.

On 4, 5 and 6 September, they teamed up with Daniel Moloney to represent the Fight Club: Pro promotion in the 2015 King of Trios tournament; they defeated Bruderschaft des Kreuzes (Jakob Hammermeier, Nøkken and Soldier Ant) in the first round, and United Nations (Juan Francisco de Coronado, Mr. Azerbaijan and The Proletariat Boar of Moldova) in the quarterfinals, before losing to Bullet Club (A.J. Styles, Matt Jackson and Nick Jackson) in the semi-finals.

In 2016, Seven and Bate began competing more regularly in Chikara, and on 21 August, they defeated The Devastation Corporation (Blaster McMassive and Flex Rumblecrunch), Los Ice Creams (El Hijo del Ice Cream and Ice Cream Jr.) and N_R_G (Hype Rockwell and Race Jaxon) in a double elimination tag team match to win the vacant Chikara Campeonatos de Parejas; they were later stripped of the title the following December after signing with WWE.

In September 2017, Bate, Seven and Pete Dunne, teaming up as House Strong Style (after they created British Strong Style in Progress Wrestling), competed in the 2017 King of Trios. They defeated House Whitewolf (A-Kid, Adam Chase and Zayas), House Throwbacks (Dasher Hatfield, Mark Angelosetti and Simon Grimm) in the quarterfinals, House Rot (Frightmare, Hallowicked and Kobald) in the semifinals via forfeit, and House Sendai Girls (Cassandra Miyagi, Dash Chisako and Meiko Satomura) in the finals to win the tournament.

=== Progress Wrestling (2016–2019) ===
Moustache Mountain had their first match in Progress at Chapter 28 on 6 April 2016, losing to Damian and Pete Dunne. At Chapter 33 on 31 July, after a loss to Damian Dunne and Pete Dunne, Seven turned heel, attacking Bate and aligning himself with Pete Dunne, thus and forming British Strong Style. This marked the beginning of a feud seeing Bate and Damian Dunne go against Seven and Pete Dunne (although Bate and Seven were still teammates in Chikara at the same time), until 27 November at Chapter 39, when Bate return to join British Strong Style, making it a trio. On 16 December 2016, Dunne, who was Progress Tag Team Champion with Seven, attempted to pass his half of the tag team titles to Bate; as the result, Progress management vacated the titles. On 30 December, Moustache Mountain defeated CCK (Chris Brookes and Kid Lykos) and London Riots (Rob Lynch and James Davis) in a three-way tag team match to win the vacant titles. They lost the titles to CCK on 25 June 2017 before regaining them on 9 July in a six-man tag team match in which Dunne was their partner, and Travis Banks was CCK's; they lost the titles back to CCK in a ladder match on 10 September.

=== Other independent promotions (2016–2019) ===
Moustache Mountain had its first match outside of Chikara or Progress Wrestling on 15 September 2016 at the WhatCulture Pro Wrestling event Loaded #11, losing to Los Perspectiva (El Hijo De Gracie and Lucha Archer) in a three-way tag team match that also included Johnny Moss and Liam Slater.

Competing in the Revolution Pro Wrestling promotion, the two won the British Tag Team Championship on 23 October 2017 at the RevPro Monday Night Mayhem event by defeating Chris Brookes and Travis Banks of CCK They lost the titles of Minoru Suzuki and Zack Sabre Jr. of Suzuki-gun on 20 January 2018.

Moustache Mountain became the inaugural FCP Tag Team Champions in the Fight Club: Pro promotion on 1 April 2018; they lost the titles to Chris Brookes and Kid Lykos of CCK on 27 July 2018, and won them a second time by defeating Schadenfreude (Chris Brookes & Kyle Fletcher) on 28 September 2019.

On the Attack! Pro Wrestling event ATTACK! Sunglasses After Dark on 22 July 2018, they defeated Team White Wolf (A-Kid and Adam Chase) to win the ATTACK! Tag Team Championship, losing it later the same day to Brookes and Fletcher. The duo also competed in the Canadian promotion International Wrestling Syndicate, where they won the IWS World Tag Team Championship in October 2017.

=== WWE ===
==== UK Championship Tournament and NXT (2017–2018) ====
On 15 December 2016, it was revealed that Bate, Seven and Dunne would be among of 16 men competing in the upcoming United Kingdom Championship Tournament on 14 and 15 January 2017 to crown the inaugural WWE United Kingdom Champion. Bate defeated Tucker in the first round to advance to the quarter-finals, before defeating Jordan Devlin to advance to the semi-finals. Seven would defeat H.C. Dyer in the first round and lose to Wolfgang in the quarterfinals, while Bate defeated Tucker in the first round, Jordan Devlin in the quarterfinals, Wolfgang in the semifinals, and Dunne in the finals to win the tournament and become the inaugural champion. After the tournament, both Bate and Seven signed contracts with WWE, which allowed them to continue taking independent bookings with some restrictions. Bate would then compete on the NXT brand, where he defended his title; he eventually lost it to Dunne at NXT TakeOver: Chicago which later earn them the NXT Year-End Award for Match of the Year.

During day one of the second annual United Kingdom Championship Tournament event on 18 June, British Strong Style defeated The Undisputed Era (Adam Cole, Kyle O'Reilly and Roderick Strong) in a six-man tag team match. The next day, Moustache Mountain defeated O'Reilly and Strong to capture the NXT Tag Team Championship, but lost the titles back to O'Reilly and Strong on 11 July episode of NXT. At NXT Takeover: Brooklyn 4, they failed to regain the championships.

==== NXT UK (2018–2022) ====
Both Bate and Seven were part of the original roster of the NXT UK brand upon the debut of the NXT UK show on 17 October 2018; they competed in a four-teams tournament to crown the inaugural NXT UK Tag Team Champions; they defeated Gallus (Mark Coffey and Wolfgang) in the first round on 24 November (aired 2 January 2019), and lost to James Drake and Zack Gibson (later known as Grizzled Young Veterans) in the finals at NXT UK TakeOver: Blackpool on 12 January. After their loss, Bate and Seven kept on competing mostly as singles wrestler while continuing to team up occasionally; Bate notably unsuccessfully challenged Walter for the WWE United Kingdom Championship at NXT UK TakeOver: Cardiff. On the 9 December 2021 episode of NXT UK, Moustache Mountain defeated Pretty Deadly to win the NXT UK Tag Team Championship, making them the first team to win both the NXT and NXT UK Tag Team Championships. On the 2 June 2022 episode of NXT UK, they lost the tag titles to Ashton Smith and Oliver Carter in a triple threat match that also involved Die Familie (Teoman and Rohan Raja). On the 16 June 2022 episode of NXT UK, Seven turned on Bate by hitting him with a low blow from behind after making a fake retirement speech. Seven then slapped Bate across the face and declared that he never needed him, before finishing the attack with a Burning Hammer, leaving Bate lying in the middle of the ring. In August 2022, Seven was released from WWE.

== Championships and accomplishments ==
- Attack! Pro Wrestling
  - Attack! 24/7 Championship – Bate (1)
  - Attack! Tag Team Championship (1 time)
- Chikara
  - Chikara Campeonatos de Parejas (1 time)
  - King of Trios (2017) - with Pete Dunne
- Fight Club:Pro
  - FCP Tag Team Championship (2 times)
- Insane Championship Wrestling
  - ICW World Heavyweight Championship (1 time) – Seven
- International Wrestling Syndicate
  - IWS World Tag Team Championship (1 time)
- Kamikaze Pro
  - Relentless Division Championship (1 time) – Bate
- Over the Top Wrestling
  - OTT Tag Team Championship (1 time)
- Progress Wrestling
  - Progress Tag Team Championship (3 times) – Seven with Pete Dunne (1), as a duo (2)
  - Progress Atlas Championship (1 time) - Seven
- Pro Wrestling Illustrated
  - Ranked Bate No. 50 of the top 500 singles wrestlers in the PWI 500 in 2017
  - Ranked Seven No. 168 of the top 500 singles wrestlers in the PWI 500 in 2018
- Revolution Pro Wrestling
  - RPW Undisputed British Tag Team Championship (1 time)
- Westside Xtreme Wrestling
  - wXw Shotgun Championship (1 time) – Bate
- WWE
  - NXT Tag Team Championship (1 time)
  - NXT UK Tag Team Championship (1 time)
  - WWE United Kingdom Championship (1 time) – Bate
  - NXT UK Heritage Cup (1 time) - Bate
  - WWE United Kingdom Championship Tournament (2017) – Bate
  - NXT Tag Team Championship Invitational (2018)
  - NXT Year-End Award (1 time)
    - Match of the Year (2017) – Bate vs. Pete Dunne for the WWE United Kingdom Championship at NXT TakeOver: Chicago
