= Impact Wrestling Turning Point (2023) =

2023 Impact Wrestling event

Turning Point
- Promotion: Impact Wrestling
- Date: October 27, 2023 (aired November 3, 2023)
- City: Newcastle upon Tyne, England
- Venue: Walker Activity Dome

Impact Plus Monthly Specials chronology
← Previous; Victory Road	Next → Final Resolution

Turning Point chronology
← Previous; 2021	Next → 2024

The 2023 Turning Point was the sixteenth professional wrestling event produced by Impact Wrestling. It took place on October 27, 2023 at the Walker Activity Dome in Newcastle upon Tyne, England, and aired on Impact Plus on November 3. The event was a part of a four-day UK Invasion Tour, marking Impact Wrestling's return to the United Kingdom after nearly eight years. The event also featured wrestlers from Revolution Pro Wrestling (RevPro).

Ten professional wrestling matches were contested at the event including two on the pre-show. In the main event, Will Ospreay defeated Eddie Edwards. In other prominent matches, Trinity defeated Deonna Purrazzo in a Last Chance match to retain the Knockouts World Championship, The Most Professional Wrestling Gods (Moose and Brian Myers) defeated Frankie Kazarian and Chris Sabin, and in the opening contest, Eric Young and Josh Alexander defeated Subculture (Flash Morgan Webster and Mark Andrews). The event also featured the Impact debuts of Alex Windsor and Simon Miller.

== Production ==
=== Background ===
Following the success of the Down Under Tour in Australia, Impact Wrestling announced a three-night UK Invasion Tour in the United Kingdom in October, marking the promotion's return to UK in eight years. Three shows were announced for the event: a show at the O2 Academy in Glasgow, Scotland on October 26, a show at the Walker Activity Dome in Newcastle upon Tyne, England on October 27, and a show at the HMV Empire Coventry in Coventry, England on October 28. On the August 31 episode of Impact!, it was announced that the October 27 show scheduled for Walker Activity Dome would be the 2023 edition of Turning Point, marking the sixteenth edition of the event, and the first since 2021. It was announced that the show would air via tape delay on Impact Plus on November 3.

=== Storylines ===
The event featured several professional wrestling matches that involved different wrestlers from pre-existing scripted feuds, plots, and storylines. Wrestlers portrayed heroes, villains, or less distinguishable characters in scripted events that built tension and culminated in a wrestling match or series of matches. Storylines were produced on Impact's weekly television program.

On the August 31 episode of Impact!, it was announced that Will Ospreay would compete in a match at Turning Point. On October 17, it was announced that Eddie Edwards would be Ospreay's opponent at the event.

The second match announced for Turning Point was a tag team match, in which Eric Young and Josh Alexander would be scheduled to take on Subculture (Flash Morgan Webster and Mark Andrews).

On October 18, two matches were added to the Turning Point card: Jordynne Grace versus Dani Luna, and The Motor City Machine Guns (Alex Shelley and Chris Sabin) versus Brian Myers and Moose.

On October 19, two matches were announced for the card including Gisele Shaw versus Alex Windsor, marking the latter's debut in Impact, and an X Division three-way match between Frankie Kazarian, Rich Swann and Trey Miguel.

At Slammiversary, Trinity defeated Deonna Purrazzo to win the Knockouts World Championship and retained the title against Purrazzo in a rematch at Emergence. On October 22, it was announced that Trinity would defend the title against Purrazzo at Turning Point and it would be Purrazzo's final chance at the title as long as Trinity was champion.

On 9 September at Impact! 1000, Joe Hendry and his tag team partner Yuya Uemura participated in the 20-man Feast or Fired match. Hendry told Uemura to grab briefcase number 4, which contained the pink slip, and Uemura was fired from Impact Wrestling. YouTuber Simon Miller reviewed Impact! 1000 on WhatCulture Wrestling's YouTube channel where he blamed Hendry for Uemura's firing. This led to Hendry and Miller attacking each other during the recording of Joe Hendry's Food Fight for Impact Plus. It resulted in a match being set up between Hendry and Miller at Turning Point.

== Results ==
No.	Results	Stipulations	Times
1^{P}	Grado and Rhino defeated Ryan Richards and Mike D Vecchio by pinfall	Tag team match	4:26
2^{P}	Leon Slater (c) defeated Mark Haskins by pinfall	Singles match for the North Wrestling Championship	11:22
3	Eric Young and Josh Alexander defeated Subculture (Mark Andrews and Flash Morgan Webster) by pinfall	Tag team match	14:02
4	Gisele Shaw defeated Alex Windsor by pinfall	Singles match	8:38
5	Rich Swann defeated Trey Miguel (with Zachary Wentz) by pinfall	Singles match	11:45
6	Jordynne Grace defeated Dani Luna by pinfall	Singles match	8:48
7	Joe Hendry defeated Simon Miller by pinfall	Singles match	8:21
8	The Most Professional Wrestling Gods (Brian Myers and Moose) defeated Frankie Kazarian (Note: Alex Shelley was originally scheduled to team with Sabin, but pulled out due to suffering an injury.) and Chris Sabin by pinfall	Tag team match	15:52
9	Trinity (c) defeated Deonna Purrazzo by submission	Last Chance match for the Impact Knockouts World Championship with Gail Kim as the special guest referee.	16:11
10	Will Ospreay defeated Eddie Edwards by pinfall	Singles match	18:20
(c) / – the champion(s) heading into the match; P / – the match was broadcast on the pre-show
