= Oro Mensah =

Swiss professional wrestler

Personal information
- Born: Oliver Sauter; 9 May 1995 (age 31) Lagos, Nigeria

Professional wrestling career
- Ring names: Mr. Exotic Erotic; Calvin Carter; Oliver Carter; Oro Mensah; Oro
- Billed height: 5 ft 11 in (1.80 m)
- Billed weight: 198 lb (90 kg)
- Billed from: Zürich, Switzerland; Ghana
- Trained by: Marshal T
- Debut: 12 May 2012

Oliver Sauter (born 9 May 1995) is a Nigerian professional wrestler. He is working as a freelancer on the independent circuit, where he performs under the ring name Oro. He is best known for his time in WWE, where he performed under the ring names Oliver Carter and Oro Mensah and is a former a one-time NXT UK Tag Team Champion. Prior to joining WWE, Sauter competed in various European promotions, most notably Westside Xtreme Wrestling (WxW) and German Wrestling Federation (GWF) under the ring name Mr. Exotic Erotic.

== Early life ==
Oliver Sauter was born in Lagos, Nigeria to a Swiss father and a Ghanaian mother. He grew up in Zürich, Switzerland.

== Professional wrestling career ==
=== Independent circuit (2012–2019) ===
Sauter wrestled his first match on 12 May 2012 at Swiss Championship Wrestling under the ring name Mr. Exotic Erotic and lost to Belthazar. On 27 October, he teamed with Cash Crash to win the SCW Tag Team Championship, defeating Bad Snake & Magic Sly. The reign lasted until 28 September 2013, when they lost the titles to Pancho & Sancho. He began competing for New European Championship Wrestling in early 2014, where he defeated former tag team partner Cash Crash on 1 February 2014. During the year, he still fought for Swiss Wrestling Entertainment and Classic Wrestling Entertainment. Over time he fought for various other independent promotions, including Westside Xtreme Wrestling (WxW), Rising Sun Wrestling, Frontier Championship Wrestling, German Hurricane Wrestling and German Wrestling Federation (GWF), winning various titles. Important to know is, he trained in the Swiss Academy school: Wrestling Academy Rorbas

=== WWE (2019–2025) ===
On 19 April 2019, Sauter made his NXT UK debut as a face under the ring name Oliver Carter in a dark match, which he lost to Kassius Ohno. He was utilized as a jobber until 16 November where he ended his losing streak. He teamed with Ashton Smith to defeat The Outliers (Dorian Mak and Riddick Moss). He returned to the brand on 17 January 2020, where he teamed with Smith to defeat Pretty Deadly (Lewis Howley and Sam Stoker).

On the 2 June 2022 episode of NXT UK, Carter and Smith won the NXT UK Tag Team Championship by defeating previous champions Moustache Mountain (Trent Seven and Tyler Bate) and Die Familie (Teoman and Rohan Raja) in a triple threat match. On the 23 June episode of NXT UK, Carter and Smith were set to defend their titles against NXT 2.0's Josh Briggs and Brooks Jensen, but Smith suffered a knee injury and had to vacate them.

On the 13 September 2022 episode of NXT, a video package was shown to reintroduce Carter under the ring name of Oro Mensah. In his debut match, Mensah defeated Grayson Waller to qualify for the NXT North American Championship ladder match at NXT Halloween Havoc. At the event on 22 October, Wes Lee won the match.

On 28 May at NXT Battleground, Mensah turned heel and joined Jakara Jackson and Lash Legend in helping Noam Dar retain his NXT Heritage Cup against Dragon Lee to form the Meta-Four stable. On the 13 June episode of NXT, Mensah competed in Dar's place due to injury, losing his NXT Heritage Cup to Nathan Frazer. After turning the whole stable into faces, Mensah wrestled for Ethan Page's NXT Championship and Lexis King's Heritage Cup, but lost both times. The Meta-Four disbanded on the 29 April episode of NXT, and Mensah and Jackson were released from WWE the following week, ending Mensah's six-year tenure with the company.

=== Return to independent circuit (2025–present) ===
On August 10, 2025, Sauter, under the ring name Oro, made his first post-WWE appearance at Blitzkrieg! Pro, where he was defeated by Andy Brown. On August 14, Oro made his debut for Ring of Honor (ROH), losing to Tomohiro Ishii.

== Championships and accomplishments ==
- WWE
  - NXT UK Tag Team Championship (1 time) – with Ashton Smith
  - WWE NXT UK Tag Team Title #1 Contendership Tournament (2022) - with Ashton Smith
