= Pretty Deadly (professional wrestling) =

Professional wrestling tag team

Tag team
- Members: Elton Prince / Lewis Howley / Lightning Lewis; Kit Wilson / Sam Stoker / Sammy Smooth
- Name(s): Greased Lightning; Pretty Deadly
- Debut: 10 January 2015
- Years active: 2015–present

Pretty Deadly are a professional wrestling tag team consisting of Lewis Howley (born 21 May 1997) and Sam Stoker (born 21 November 1994). They are signed to WWE, where they perform on the SmackDown brand under the respective ring names Elton Prince and Kit Wilson, although Prince is currently inactive due to a neck injury. In WWE, they are former two-time NXT Tag Team Champions and one-time NXT UK Tag Team Champions.

== Professional wrestling career ==
=== Independent circuit (2015–2020) ===
Lightning Lewis trained with Dropkixx, whilst Sammy Smooth trained with International Pro Wrestling: United Kingdom (IPW:UK).

Their first tag matches together were as Greased Lightning (Lightning Lewis and Sammy Smooth), making their debut on 10 January 2015 at the IPW:UK Weekend of Champions event, held by International Pro Wrestling: United Kingdom (IPW:UK), defeating The Monsters (eXodus and Snare) in a pre-show dark match. They went on to have four more matches on record under the name Greased Lightning, two for IPW:UK, two for WrestleForce - winning three and losing two overall.

They captured the IPW:UK Tag Team Championship one-time as a freebird trio including James Castle known as The Collective, and one-time as Pretty Deadly (Lewis Howley and Sammy Smooth/Sam Stoker). They are also known for their tenures with professional wrestling promotions such as Progress Wrestling, Revolution Pro Wrestling, and New Generation Wrestling.

=== WWE ===
==== NXT UK (2020–2022) ====
Lewis Howley and Sam Stoker made sporadic appearances across NXT UK in 2019, making their debut on 20 March 2019 episode of NXT UK, losing to The Hunt (Primate and Wild Boar). In January 2020, it was announced that they had signed a contract with WWE and would report to the WWE Performance Center.

On 28 January 2021 episode of NXT UK, Pretty Deadly became the number one contenders for the NXT UK Tag Team Championship after defeating The Hunt, Flash Morgan Webster and Mark Andrews, and Ashton Smith and Oliver Carter in a fatal four-way elimination tag team match. On 25 February episode of NXT UK, they defeated Gallus (Mark Coffey and Wolfgang) to win the NXT UK Tag Team Championship. They would retain the titles against Amir Jordan and Kenny Williams on 1 April episode of NXT UK after Williams turned on Jordan. On the 4 June episode of NXT UK, Pretty Deadly would successfully defend their titles against Jack Starz and Nathan Frazer. On 19 August episode of NXT UK, Pretty Deadly would retain against Moustache Mountain (Trent Seven and Tyler Bate). However, they would lose the titles to Moustache Mountain in a rematch on 9 December episode of NXT UK, ending their reign at 287 days.

==== NXT (2020–2023) ====
On the 5 April 2022 episode of NXT, Pretty Deadly, now under the ring names of Elton Prince and Kit Wilson, revealed themselves as the Creed Brothers' attackers after they defeated Imperium (Fabian Aichner and Marcel Barthel), effectively making their debut on the NXT brand. The following week, they won a gauntlet match involving the Creed Brothers, Legado Del Fantasma (Raul Mendoza and Joaquin Wilde), Josh Briggs and Brooks Jensen, and Grayson Waller and Sanga, to win the vacant NXT Tag Team Championship, making them the first tag team to win the titles on their NXT debut and the second team to have won the NXT and NXT UK Tag Team Championships. They lost the titles to the Creed Brothers on 4 June at NXT In Your House, ending their first reign at 53 days.

At Worlds Collide on 4 September, Pretty Deadly defeated Gallus, NXT Tag Team Champions the Creed Brothers, and NXT UK Tag Team Champions Brooks Jensen and Josh Briggs in a fatal four-way tag team elimination match to unify the NXT and NXT UK Tag Team Championships and reigned as the NXT Tag Team Champions. At NXT Deadline, Pretty Deadly lost the NXT Tag Team Championship to The New Day (Kofi Kingston and Xavier Woods), ending their second reign at 98 days. After failing to regain the titles, Pretty Deadly began feuding with Tony D'Angelo and Channing "Stacks" Lorenzo, and lost to them at Spring Breakin in a trunk match, and this would be their final NXT appearance.

==== SmackDown; hiatus (2023–present) ====
As part of the 2023 WWE Draft, Pretty Deadly were drafted to the SmackDown brand. Pretty Deadly made their SmackDown debut on 19 May episode, defeating The Brawling Brutes' Butch and Ridge Holland. On 16 June episode of SmackDown, Pretty Deadly won a tag team gauntlet match to become the number one contenders for the Undisputed WWE Tag Team Championship but failed to capture the titles from Kevin Owens and Sami Zayn on 30 June episode of SmackDown. On 14 July episode of SmackDown, Prince suffered a separated shoulder during their tag team match against The Brawling Brutes and had to be sidelined. Pretty Deadly returned on 13 October episode of SmackDown in a tag team match victory against Butch and Holland. After being away in-ring since then, Pretty Deadly lost to Los Garza (Angel and Berto) on 10 January 2025 episode of SmackDown in a first round #1 contendership match to determine the next challenger for the WWE Tag Team Championship.

On the 2 May episode of SmackDown, Prince suffered a severe neck injury during a match with Fraxiom after the team took a double reverse DDT from Nathan Frazer. Prince received neck fusion surgery, rendering him out of action indefinitely and putting Pretty Deadly on hiatus. Following Prince's injury, Kit Wilson began to appear as a singles competitor on Smackdown and Main Event, debuting a new theme song and flamboyant gimmick in which he claims to be on a mission to eliminate toxic masculinity.

== Other media ==
Pretty Deadly made their video game debut as playable characters in WWE 2K23 as DLC and have since appeared in WWE 2K24, WWE 2K25, and WWE 2K26.

== Personal lives ==
Lewis Howley hails from Grays, Thurrock, Essex, England, Howley attended Hassenbrook Academy in Stanford-le-Hope, Thurrock. In 2017, Howley appeared on an episode of First Dates. Howley is currently in a relationship with former professional wrestler and former NXT backstage reporter Kelly Verbil, who went by the on-screen name Kelly Kincaid. Their daughter was born on 20 September 2024.

Sam Stoker hails from London, England. Since 22 September 2024, Stoker has been married to fellow professional wrestler Lucy Bridge, who performed in WWE on the NXT brand under the ring name Stevie Turner.

== Championships and accomplishments ==
- International Pro Wrestling: United Kingdom
  - IPW:UK Tag Team Championship (2 times) – by themselves (1) and with James Castle (1)
- WWE
  - NXT Tag Team Championship (2 times)
  - NXT UK Tag Team Championship (1 time)
