= Wolfgang (wrestler) =

Scottish professional wrestler

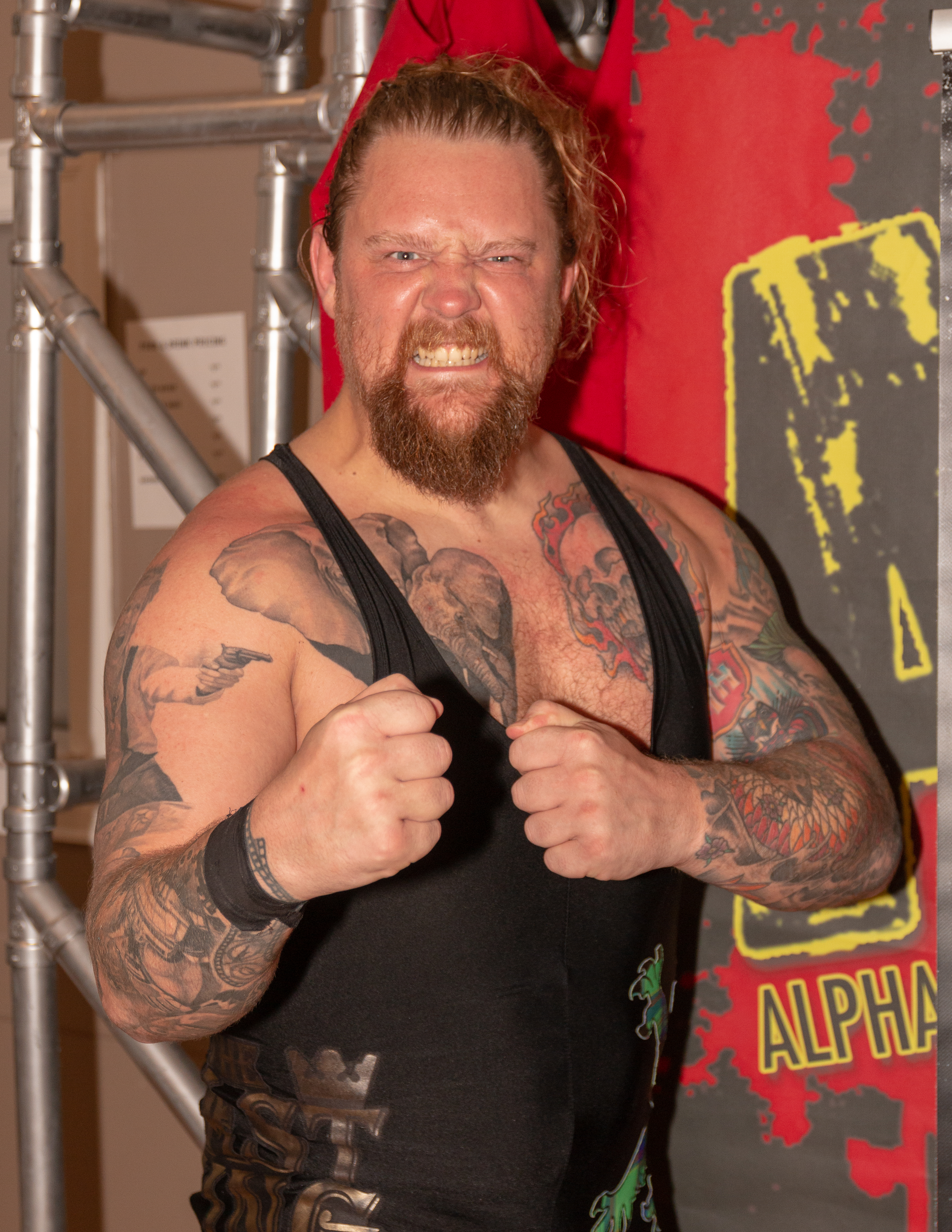
- Wolfgang in 2019

Personal information
- Born: Barry Young; 3 December 1986 (age 39) Glasgow, Scotland
- Spouse: Molly Spartan

Professional wrestling career
- Ring name: Wolfgang
- Billed height: 6 ft 1 in (1.85 m)
- Billed weight: 255 lb (116 kg)
- Trained by: British Championship Wrestling; WWE UK Performance Center
- Debut: 2003

Barry Young (born 3 December 1986), better known by the ring name Wolfgang, is a Scottish professional wrestler. He is signed to Major League Wrestling (MLW), where he is a member of Glasgow Boys On Top. He also makes appearances on the British independent circuit. He is best known for his time in WWE, where he performed on the NXT brand as a member of Gallus. He was a former one-time NXT and NXT UK Tag Team Champion with Mark Coffey.

Young is also known for his tenure with Insane Championship Wrestling (ICW), where he was a former ICW World Heavyweight champion and a former ICW Zero-G champion.

== Professional wrestling career ==
=== Insane Championship Wrestling ===
Wolfgang debuted on Insane Championship Wrestling's debut show in 2006 and challenged Drew Galloway for the ICW Heavyweight Championship at the next event.

Wolfgang captured his first championship in ICW at ICW: Tramspotting in 2013 when he defeated Andy Wild for the ICW Zero-G Championship. On 31 October 2017, Wolfgang defeated Joe Coffey for the ICW World Heavyweight Championship. He held the title for 189 days before losing it to Trent Seven.

=== WWE (2016–2025) ===
==== NXT UK (2016–2022) ====
On 15 December 2016, it was revealed that Young would be one of 16 men competing in a two-night tournament to crown the first ever WWE United Kingdom Champion on 14 and 15 January 2017. Young defeated Tyson T-Bone in the first round, advancing to the quarter-finals. In the quarter-finals, he went on to defeat Trent Seven before losing to Seven's tag team partner Tyler Bate in the semi-finals.

On the 13 September 2017 episode of NXT, Wolfgang faced Pete Dunne for the WWE United Kingdom Championship in a losing effort. After the match, Wolfgang was brutally attacked by The Undisputed Era (Adam Cole, Bobby Fish, and Kyle O'Reilly). This attack ended when Trent Seven and Tyler Bate came out to help Wolfgang. On 18 June 2018, it was announced that Young would fight Adam Cole on the 2nd night of the UK Championship Tournament, for the NXT North American Championship. He would go on to lose the match.

Young turned heel on the 31 October edition of NXT UK after a losing match against Mark Andrews, allying himself with brothers Mark and Joe Coffey against Andrews, Flash Morgan Webster, and Travis Banks. On the first 5 December episode of NXT UK, the trio of Wolfgang and the Coffey brothers was officially dubbed Gallus (Scottish slang for daring or confident) during a segment calling out British Strong Style, as well as the returning Travis Banks.

==== NXT (2022–2025) ====
On NXT Heatwave, Gallus made their NXT 2.0 debut, attacking Diamond Mine. On 23 August 2022, Gallus made their tag team debut on NXT facing NXT UK Tag Team Champions Brooks Jensen and Josh Briggs, which they would go on to win via countout. At Worlds Collide, Gallus became the second team eliminated from the Fatal four-way tag team elimination match for the NXT and NXT UK Tag Team Championship. Gallus would go on to have a rivalry with Briggs and Jensen, with the latter winning a No Disqualification tag team match between the teams. Gallus was later suspended in September for attacking officials.

At New Year's Evil on January 10, 2023, Gallus returned from their suspension and won a gauntlet match to become the #1 contenders for the NXT Tag Team Championship, which Coffey and Wolfgang won on Vengeance Day the month after. On the 14 March episode of NXT, Gallus retained their titles against Pretty Deadly. At NXT Stand & Deliver, Gallus defeated the Creed Brothers and The Family to retain the tag titles with help from a returning Joe Coffey. Gallus would defend against the Creeds and The Dyad in the next months including a triple-threat on the 14 April episode of NXT and against the Creeds at NXT Battleground. At NXT Gold Rush, Gallus defeated Malik Blade and Edris Enofe. At NXT: The Great American Bash, Gallus lost the NXT Tag Team Championship to Tony D'Angelo and Channing "Stacks" Lorenzo, ending their reign at 176 days.

In April 2024, ESPN reported that Gallus helped train The Rock for his tag team match with Undisputed WWE Universal Champion Roman Reigns against Cody Rhodes and World Heavyweight Champion Seth "Freakin" Rollins at Night 1 of WrestleMania XL. On the May 14, 2024 episode of NXT, and as the show was going off the air, the cameras went backstage, showing Wes Lee, Josh Briggs and Ivar assaulted backstage. The attackers were then revealed to be Gallus, making their first televised appearance on NXT since the February 13, 2024 episode of NXT. On May 2, 2025, all members of Gallus were released from WWE.

=== Iron Girders Pro Wrestling ===
Young is the owner, operator and head coach of the Iron Girders Pro Wrestling Gym and Iron Girders Pro Wrestling (IGPW) and wrestling promotion in Glasgow. Trainers include former ICW World Heavyweight Champions Stevie Boy and BT Gunn.

IGPW began running events on 26 March 2022 In addition to trainee talent and coaches, IGPW events have featured Eric Young, Leyton Buzzard and Kenny Williams.

IGPW has also collaborated with other events and promotions in Scotland. In March and April 2022, they hosted two Scottish Interpromotional Championship title changes. In September 2022, IGPW participated in the ACME Comic Con by hosting a two-night tournament to crown the inaugural ACME Comic Con Interpromotional Championship, which was won by Eddie Castle.

In June 2023, IGPW promoted two events with Fife Pro Wrestling Asylum, which featured FPWA's Andy Roberts defending the Union of European Wrestling Alliances European Heavyweight Championship against IGPW's BT Gunn and Kez Evans. On 22 July 2023, IGPW presented a wrestling card for the Alexandra Park Festival Day.

== Other media ==
Young made his first video game appearance in WWE 2K24.

== Championships and accomplishments ==
- British Championship Wrestling
  - BCW Heavyweight Championship (1 time)
  - BCW Openweight Championship (2 times)
  - BCW Tag Team Championship (5 times) – with Darkside (3), Red Lightning (1), and James Scott (1)
- Insane Championship Wrestling
  - ICW World Heavyweight Championship (1 time)
  - ICW Zero-G Championship (2 times)
  - ICW "Match of the Year" Bammy Award – for Legion (Mikey Whiplash, Tommy End & Michael Dante) vs New Age Kliq (BT Gunn, Chris Renfrew & Wolfgang) at Fear & Loathing VIII (2015)
  - Square Go! (2016)
  - PBW Heavyweight Championship (2 times)
  - PBW Tag Team Championship (1 time) – with Lionheart
  - PBW Heavyweight Championship Tournament (2006)
- Pro Wrestling Illustrated
  - Ranked No. 203 of the top 500 singles wrestlers in the PWI 500 in 2019
- Rock N Wrestling
  - Highland Rumble (2016)
- Showcase Pro Wrestling
  - SPW British Heavyweight Championship (1 time)
- Scottish Wrestling Alliance
  - NWA Scottish Heavyweight Championship (2 times)
  - SWA Laird of the Ring Championship (1 time)
  - SWA Tag Team Championship (2 times) – with Falcon (1) and Darkside (1)
  - Laird Of The Ring Tournament (2007)
  - W3L Heavyweight Champion (1 time)
  - W3L Tag Team Championship (1 time) – with Darkside
  - Seven Deadly Sins Tournament (2010)
- Wrestle Zone Wrestling
  - wZw Interpromotional Championship (1 time)
- WWE
  - NXT Tag Team Championship (1 time) – with Mark Coffey
  - NXT UK Tag Team Championship (1 time) – with Mark Coffey
- Scottish Wrestling Network
  - SWN Award (1 time)
    - Outstanding Recognition Award for Extraordinary Service (2017)
  - Hall of Fame (2017)
