= Mark Coffey =

Scottish professional wrestler

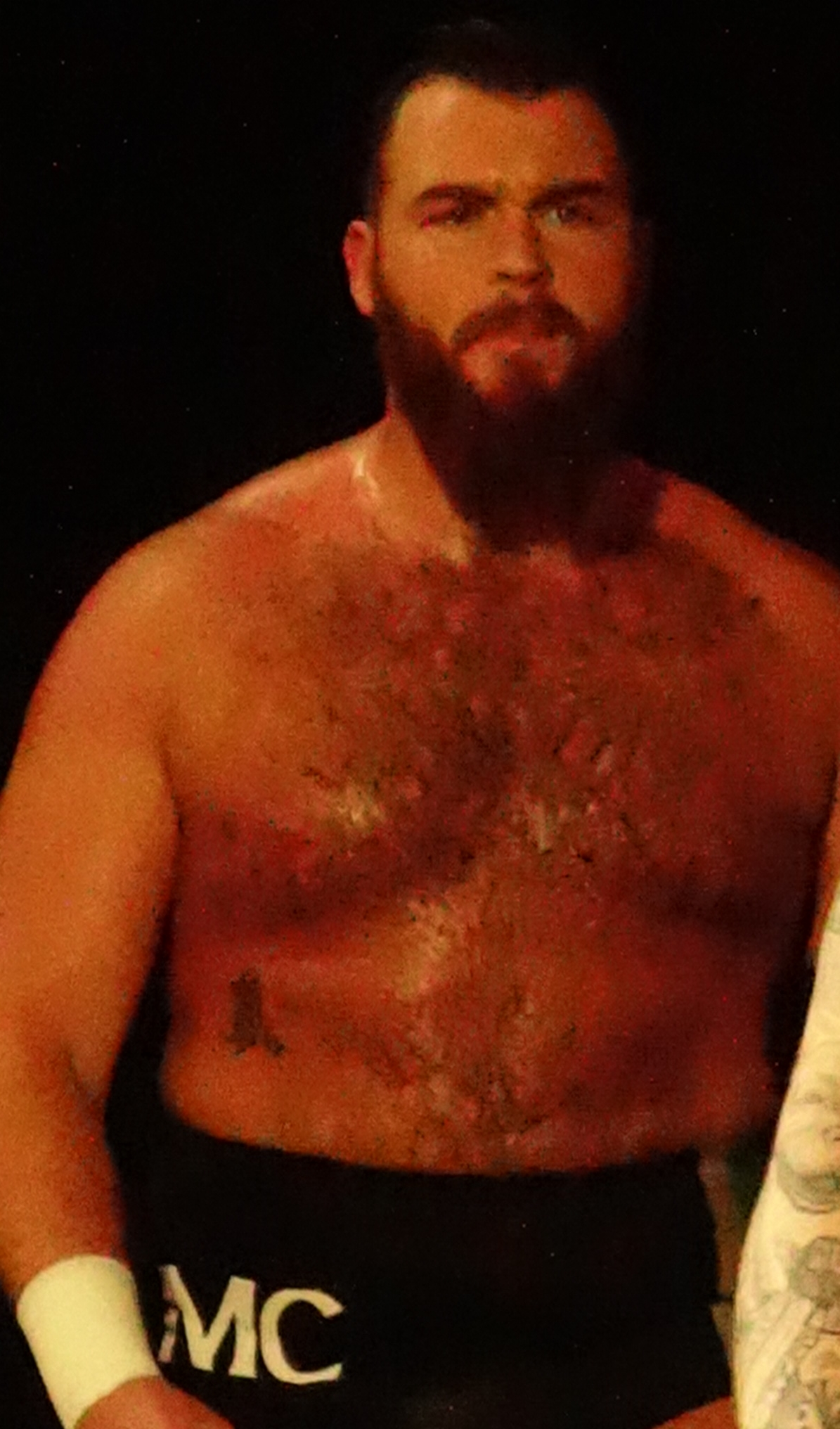
- Coffey in 2019

Personal information
- Born: Mark Anthony Coffey; 13 February 1990 (age 36) Glasgow, Scotland
- Relative: Joe Coffey (brother)

Professional wrestling career
- Ring name: Mark Coffey
- Billed height: 6 ft 2 in (188 cm)
- Billed weight: 235 lb (107 kg)
- Billed from: Glasgow, Scotland
- Trained by: Finn Bálor; Johnny Moss; Killian Dain
- Debut: 28 August 2010

Mark Anthony Coffey (born 13 February 1990) is a Scottish professional wrestler. He is signed to Major League Wrestling (MLW), where he is a member of Glasgow Boys On Top. He also performs on the Scottish independent circuit – predominantly for Insane Championship Wrestling (ICW), where he is the current ICW World Heavyweight Champion in his first reign. He is best known for his time in WWE, where he performed on the NXT brand and was a former NXT UK Heritage Cup and NXT Tag Team Champion with Wolfgang.

== Professional wrestling career ==
=== Early career (2010–2018) ===
Coffey debuted as a wrestler for the independent promotion World Wide Wrestling League in 2010. Before his arrangement with WWE, he wrestled for various other promotions including Pro Wrestling Elite, Target Wrestling and the Scottish Wrestling Alliance, winning several titles.

=== Insane Championship Wrestling (2012–2019) ===
Coffey made his ICW match at the ICW 1st Annual Square Go! battle royal on 21 January 2012. In his early run he would work with Noam Dar, Andy Wild and his brother in efforts to win the ICW Tag Team Championship and ICW Zero-G Championship.

Between 2013 and 2018, he would become a three-time ICW Zero-G Champion by defeating Mikey Whiplash, Fergall Devitt and Aaron Echo, Andy Wild, DCT, Jordan Devlin and Rampage Brown in a gauntlet at ICW: BarraMania 4. He also earned four ICW Tag Team Championship reigns with Polo Promotions partner Jackie Polo through wins over Brian Kendrick and Paul London, Kid Fite and Sha Samuels, Davey Boy and Joe Hendry, and Mike Bird and Wild Boar. He also got two chances at the ICW World Heavyweight Championship, firstly against Trent Seven in 2017 and lastly against Lionheart in 2019.

=== WWE (2018–2025) ===
==== NXT UK (2018–2022) ====
Coffey would regularly appear on the NXT UK brand, being accompanied by his brother Joe in a winning effort on the first ever televised match on NXT UK. They would both go on to form the stable Gallus alongside Wolfgang and feud with British Strong Style.

On the 6 February 2019 episode of NXT UK, Coffey faced Walter in a losing effort in Walter's second match on NXT UK. On the 4 October episode of NXT UK, Mark and Wolfgang defeated previous champions Mark Andrews and Flash Morgan Webster for the NXT UK Tag Team Championship, going on to hold it for 497 days.

On the 14 July 2022 episode of NXT UK, Coffey defeated Noam Dar to become the new NXT UK Heritage Cup Champion. He would soon lose it back to Dar on the 25 August episode of NXT UK.

==== NXT (2022–2025) ====
On NXT Heatwave, Gallus made their NXT 2.0 debut, attacking Diamond Mine. On August 23, 2022, Gallus made their tag team debut on NXT facing NXT UK Tag Team Champions Brooks Jensen and Josh Briggs, which they would win via countout. At Worlds Collide, Gallus became the second team eliminated from the Fatal four-way tag team elimination match for the NXT and NXT UK Tag Team Championship. Gallus would have a rivalry with Briggs and Jensen, with the latter winning a No Disqualification tag team match between the teams. Gallus was suspended in September for attacking officials.

At New Year's Evil on January 10, 2023, Gallus returned from their suspension and won a gauntlet match to become the #1 contenders for the NXT Tag Team Championship, which Coffey and Wolfgang won on Vengeance Day the month after. On the 14 March episode of NXT, Gallus retained their titles against Pretty Deadly. At NXT Stand & Deliver, Gallus defeated the Creed Brothers and The Family to retain the tag titles with help from a returning Joe Coffey. Gallus would defend against the Creeds and The Dyad in the next months including a triple-threat on the 14 April episode of NXT and against the Creeds at NXT Battleground. At NXT Gold Rush, Gallus defeated Malik Blade and Edris Enofe. At NXT: The Great American Bash, Gallus lost the NXT Tag Team Championship to Tony D'Angelo and Channing "Stacks" Lorenzo, ending their reign at 176 days.

In April 2024, ESPN reported that Gallus help trained The Rock for his tag team match with Undisputed WWE Universal Champion Roman Reigns against Cody Rhodes and World Heavyweight Champion Seth "Freakin" Rollins at Night 1 of WrestleMania XL. On the May 14, 2024 episode of NXT, and as the show was going off the air, the cameras went backstage, showing Wes Lee, Josh Briggs and Ivar assaulted backstage. The attackers were then revealed to be Gallus, making their first televised appearance on NXT since the February 13, 2024 episode of NXT. On May 2, 2025, all members of Gallus were released from WWE.

== Championships and accomplishments ==
- Insane Championship Wrestling
  - ICW World Heavyweight Championship (1 time, current)
  - ICW Zero-G Championship (3 times)
  - ICW Tag Team Championship (4 times) – with Jackie Polo
  - Square Go! (2026)
  - 4th Triple Crown Champion
- Pro Wrestling Elite
  - PWE Tag Team Championship (1 time) – with Jackie Polo
- Pro Wrestling Illustrated
  - Ranked No. 178 of the top 500 singles wrestlers in the PWI 500 in 2019
- Scottish Wrestling Alliance
  - Scottish Heavyweight Championship (1 time)
  - SWA Tag Team Championship (3 times) – with Jackie Polo (2) and Joe Coffey (1)
- Target Wrestling
  - Target Wrestling Tag Team Championship (1 time) – with Jackie Polo
  - W3L Tag Team Championship (1 time) – with Joe Coffey
- WWE
  - NXT UK Heritage Cup (1 time)
  - NXT Tag Team Championship (1 time) – with Wolfgang
  - NXT UK Tag Team Championship (1 time) – with Wolfgang
