= NXT UK Tag Team Championship =

Former professional wrestling championship in WWE

- The NXT UK Tag Team Championship belt with default side plates

Details
- Promotion: WWE
- Date established: 18 June 2018
- Date retired: 4 September 2022 (unified with the NXT Tag Team Championship)
Statistics
- First champions: James Drake and Zack Gibson
- Final champions: Brooks Jensen and Josh Briggs
- Longest reign: Gallus (Mark Coffey and Wolfgang) (497 days) (Note: The actual length of the reign is undeterminable, as the actual date Gallus lost the championship is unknown. As such, the reign length indicated here is what WWE officially recognizes for the reign.)
- Shortest reign: Flash Morgan Webster and Mark Andrews (34 days) (Note: WWE recognizes their reign as lasting 47 days due to tape delay, and instead recognize that Ashton Smith and Oliver Carter had the shortest reign at 20 days also due to tape delay (although Smith and Carter's reign actually lasted 62 days).)
- Oldest champion: Trent Seven (40 years, 110 days)
- Youngest champion: Brooks Jensen (20 years, 306 days)
- Heaviest champion: Brooks Jensen and Josh Briggs (511 lbs combined)
- Lightest champion: Flash Morgan Webster and Mark Andrews (303 lbs combined)

The NXT UK Tag Team Championship was a men's professional wrestling tag team championship that was created and promoted by the American promotion WWE. It was defended on the NXT UK brand division, a sister brand of WWE's developmental territory NXT based in the United Kingdom. Established on 18 June 2018, the inaugural championship team was James Drake and Zack Gibson. On 4 September 2022 at Worlds Collide, the title was unified into the NXT Tag Team Championship, officially retiring the title in the process, with the team of Brooks Jensen and Josh Briggs recognized as the final champions.

== History ==
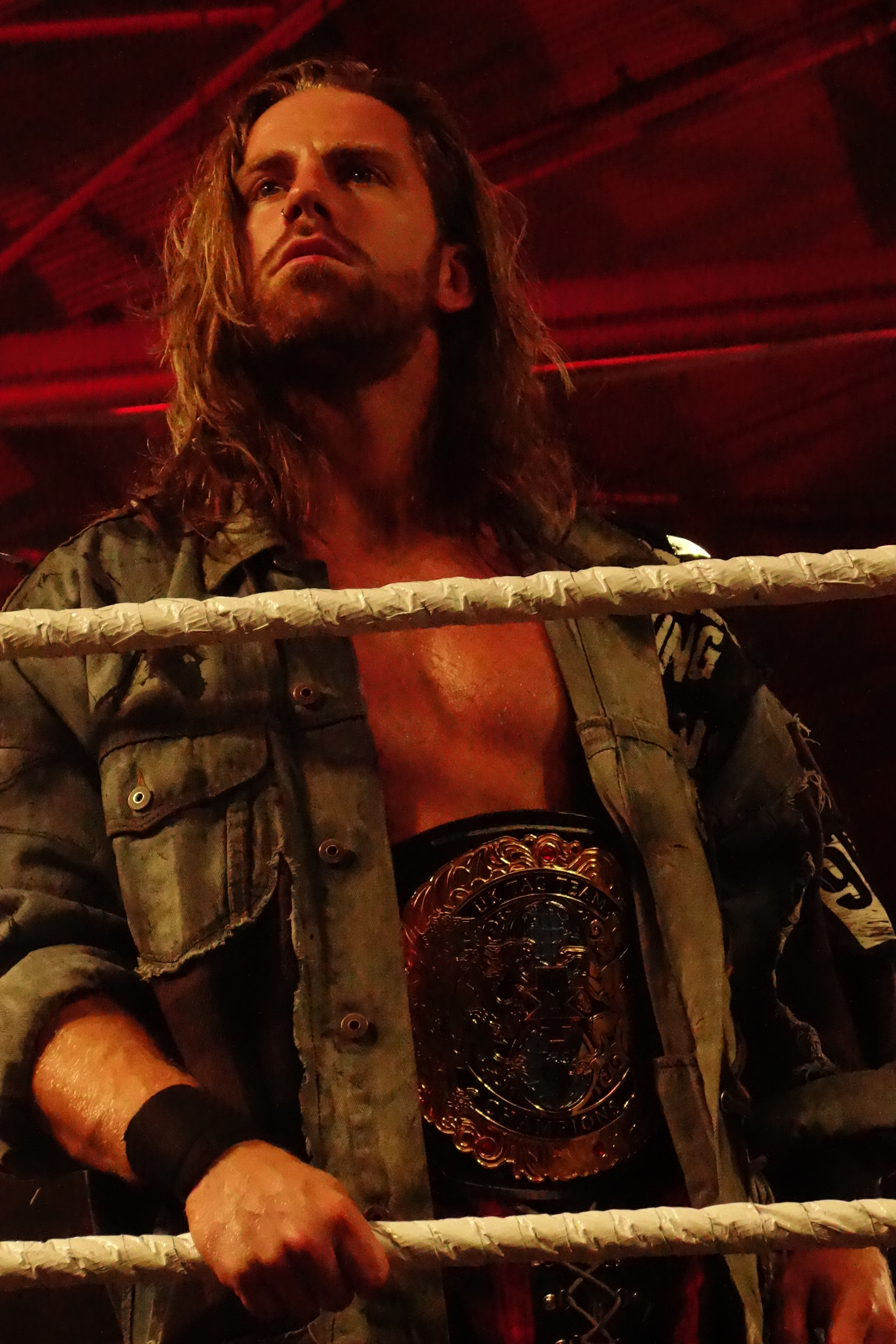
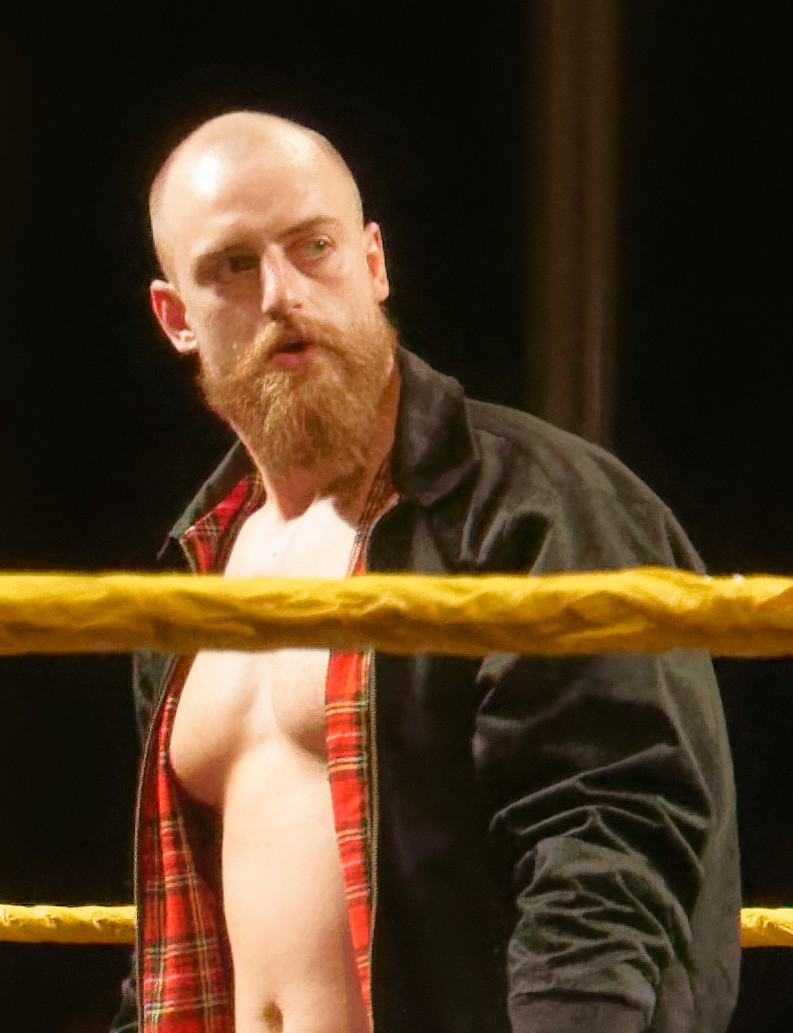
Inaugural champions James Drake and Zack Gibson

In a press conference at The O2 Arena on 15 December 2016, the American professional wrestling promotion WWE announced plans to establish a United Kingdom-based brand on which professional wrestlers from the country would compete. The WWE United Kingdom Championship (later renamed NXT United Kingdom Championship) was established that same day, however, it was not until mid-2018 when NXT UK was formally established as the United Kingdom-based brand, and sister brand of the American-based NXT. On 18 June during the first night of the 2018 United Kingdom Championship Tournament, the NXT UK Tag Team Championship, along with the NXT UK Women's Championship, was announced for the NXT UK brand. A four-team single-elimination tournament took place on the 24 and 25 November tapings of NXT UK (aired 2 and 9 January 2019, respectively). The finals occurred at TakeOver: Blackpool on 12 January, where the team of James Drake and Zack Gibson defeated Moustache Mountain (Trent Seven and Tyler Bate) to become the inaugural champions.

In August 2022, WWE announced that the NXT UK brand would go on hiatus and would relaunch as NXT Europe at a later time. As such, NXT UK's championships were unified into their respective NXT championship counterparts. Subsequently, the NXT UK Tag Team Championship was retired on 4 September 2022 at Worlds Collide. At the event, Pretty Deadly (Elton Prince and Kit Wilson) defeated NXT Tag Team Champions The Creed Brothers (Brutus Creed and Julius Creed), Gallus (Mark Coffey and Wolfgang), and reigning NXT UK Tag Team Champions Brooks Jensen and Josh Briggs in a fatal four-way tag team elimination match to unify the NXT UK Tag Team Championship into the NXT Tag Team Championship, with Jensen and Briggs recognized as the final NXT UK Tag Team Champions. Pretty Deadly went forward as the unified NXT Tag Team Champions.

=== Inaugural tournament ===
Semifinals; NXT UK; November 24–25, 2018 (Aired: January 2–9)
Moustache Mountain (Trent Seven and Tyler Bate)	Pinfall
Gallus (Mark Coffey and Wolfgang)	14:39
Grizzled Young Veterans (James Drake and Zack Gibson)	Pinfall
Flash Morgan Webster and Mark Andrews	9:19

Final; TakeOver: Blackpool; 12 January 2019
Moustache Mountain	23:45
Grizzled Young Veterans	Pinfall

== Belt design ==
The championship belts were unveiled by WWE Chief Operating Officer and NXT head Triple H and NXT UK General Manager Johnny Saint on the 14 October 2018 tapings of NXT UK in Plymouth. The center plate of the championship belts was modeled on the NXT UK logo, which itself took inspiration from the United Kingdom's royal coat of arms, featuring a lion and a horse (instead of the traditional unicorn) with a vertical NXT logo between them; the animals were gold while the logo was silver (the WWE logo was affixed at the center of the X). Above and below the logo were two halves of the globe which were colored blue. A banner above the upper globe read "UK Tag Team" while a banner below the lower globe read "Champions". A gold ornamented border with red jewels circled the center plate. Gold and black divider bars with red jewels at each end separated the center plate from the belt's two side plates. In what became a prominent feature of WWE's championship belts, the side plates featured removable center sections that could be replaced with the reigning champion's logo; the default side plates featured the WWE logo on a blue globe. The plates were on a black leather strap.

== Reigns ==
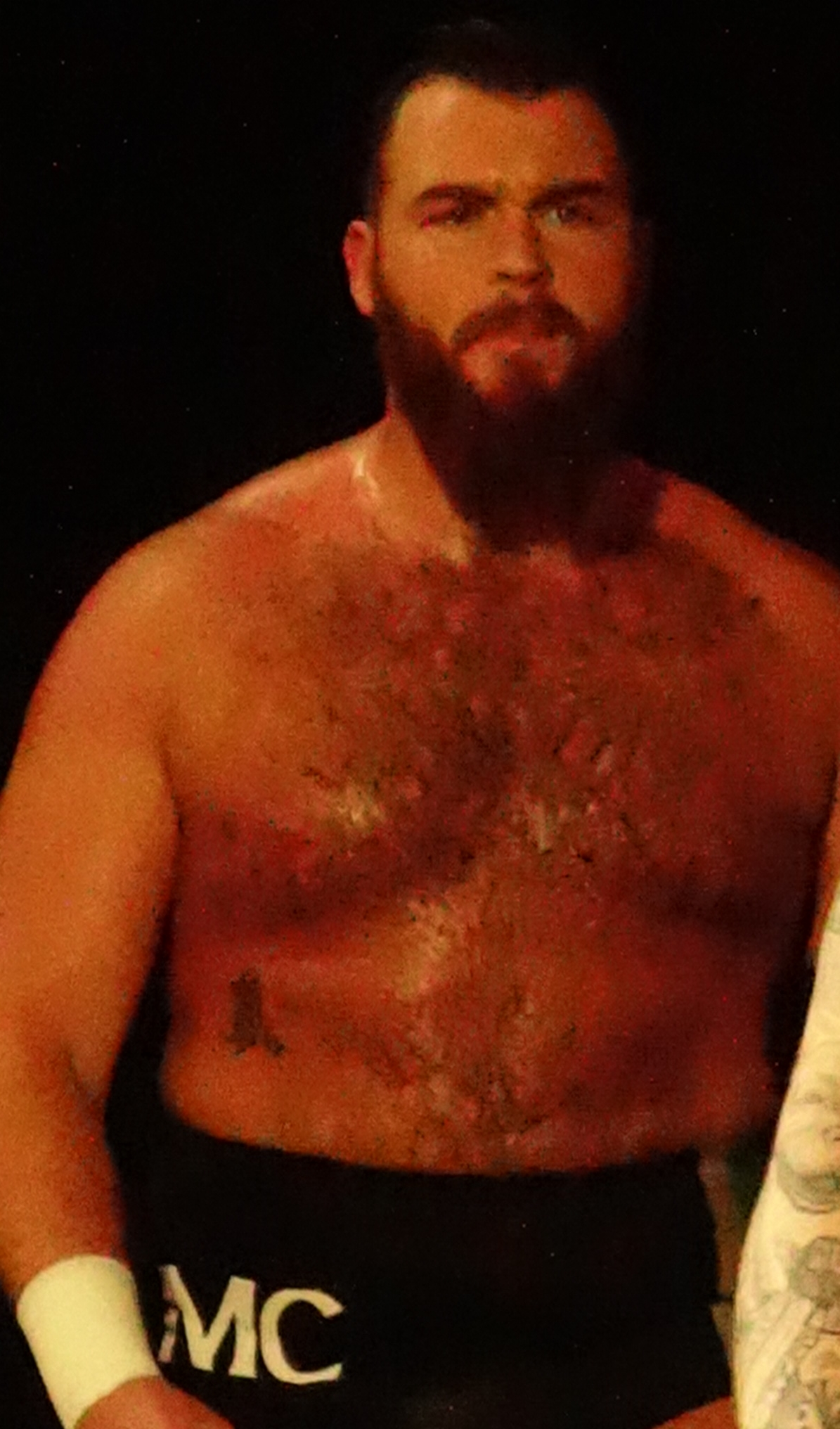
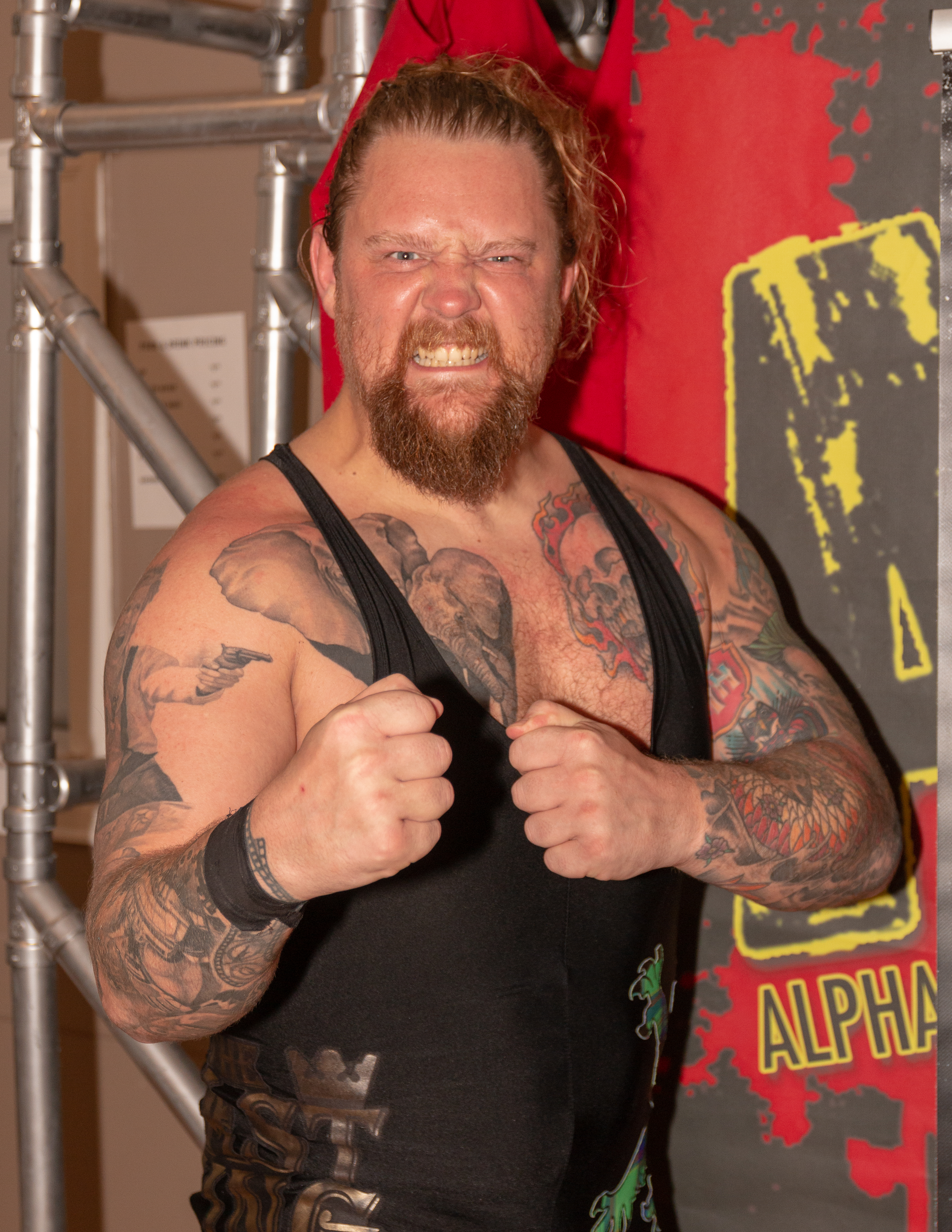
Longest-reigning champions Gallus (Mark Coffey and Wolfgang), who held the title for 497 days (as recognized by WWE)

Over the championship's four year history, there were seven reigns between seven teams composed of 14 individual champions and one vacancy. James Drake and Zack Gibson were the inaugural champions. Gallus (Mark Coffey and Wolfgang) had the longest reign, which WWE recognizes as lasting 497 days (beginning 17 October 2019 and ending 25 February 2021); the actual length of their reign is undeterminable as the real date they lost the title is unknown. Flash Morgan Webster and Mark Andrews had the shortest reign at 34 days; however, WWE recognizes their reign as lasting 47 days due to tape delay, and as such, recognize that Ashton Smith and Oliver Carter had the shortest reign at 20 days also due to tape delay (although Smith and Carter's reign actually lasted 62 days). Brooks Jensen and Josh Briggs are recognized as the final champions. The oldest champion was Trent Seven, winning the title at 40 years old, while the youngest was Jensen, winning it at 20.

Key
No.	Overall reign number
Reign	Reign number for the specific team—reign numbers for the individuals are in parentheses, if different
Days	Number of days held
Days recog.	Number of days held recognized by the promotion
N/A	Unknown information

No.	Champion	Championship change			Reign statistics			Notes	Ref.
No.	Champion	Date	Event	Location	Reign	Days	Days recog.	Notes	Ref.
WWE: NXT UK
1	Grizzled Young Veterans (James Drake and Zack Gibson)	12 January 2019	TakeOver: Blackpool	Blackpool, England	1	231	230	Defeated Moustache Mountain (Trent Seven and Tyler Bate) in the finals of a four-team tournament to become the inaugural champions.	
2	Flash Morgan Webster and Mark Andrews	31 August 2019	TakeOver: Cardiff	Cardiff, Wales	1	34	47	This was a triple threat tag team match, also involving Gallus (Mark Coffey and Wolfgang). WWE recognizes this reign as ending on 17 October 2019, when the following episode aired on tape delay.	
3	Gallus (Mark Coffey and Wolfgang)	4 October 2019	NXT UK	Brentwood, England	1	N/A	497	WWE recognizes this reign as beginning on 17 October 2019 and ending on 25 February 2021, when the respective episodes aired on tape delay. The actual date of when they lost the title is unknown.	
4	Pretty Deadly (Lewis Howley and Sam Stoker)	25 February 2021 (air date)	NXT UK	London, England	1	N/A	287	WWE recognizes this reign as beginning on 25 February 2021, when the episode aired on tape delay. The actual date of when the match took place is unknown.	
5	Moustache Mountain (Trent Seven and Tyler Bate)	9 December 2021 (air date)	NXT UK	London, England	1	N/A	174	WWE recognizes this reign as beginning on 9 December 2021, when the episode aired on tape delay. The actual date of when the match took place is unknown.	
6	Ashton Smith and Oliver Carter	21 April 2022	NXT UK	London, England	1	62	20	This was a triple threat tag team match, also involving Die Familie (Teoman and Rohan Raja). WWE recognizes this reign as beginning on 2 June 2022 and ending on 23 June 2022, when the episodes aired on tape delay.	
—	Vacated	22 June 2022	NXT UK	London, England	—	—	—	Vacated after Ashton Smith suffered a knee injury. Aired on tape delay on 23 June 2022.	
7	Brooks Jensen and Josh Briggs	22 June 2022	NXT UK	London, England	1	74	73	This was a fatal four-way tag team elimination match, also involving Die Familie (Teoman and Rohan Raja), Dave Mastiff and Jack Starz, and Mark Andrews and Wild Boar for the vacant titles. WWE recognizes this reign as beginning on 23 June 2022, when the episode aired on tape delay.	
—	Unified	4 September 2022	Worlds Collide	Orlando, Florida, U.S.	—	—	—	Pretty Deadly (Elton Prince and Kit Wilson) defeated NXT Tag Team Champions The Creed Brothers (Brutus Creed and Julius Creed), Gallus (Mark Coffey and Wolfgang), and NXT UK Tag Team Champions Brooks Jensen and Josh Briggs in a fatal four-way tag team elimination match to unify the NXT UK Tag Team Championship into the NXT Tag Team Championship. The NXT UK Tag Team Championship was retired with Jensen and Briggs recognized as the final champions. Pretty Deadly went forward as the unified NXT Tag Team Champions.	

== See also ==
- Tag team championships in WWE
- Professional wrestling in the United Kingdom
