= Ashton Smith (wrestler) =

English professional wrestler (born 1988)

Personal information
- Born: Ashton Trent Smith; 15 December 1988 (age 37) Kingston, Jamaica

Professional wrestling career
- Ring name(s): D-Rok; Derice Coffie; Ashton Smith
- Billed weight: 206 lb (93 kg)
- Billed from: Manchester, England
- Debut: 11 February 2007

Ashton Trent Smith (born 15 December 1988) is a Jamaican-English professional wrestler. He is best known for his time in WWE, where he performed on the NXT UK brand under his real name. He is a former NXT UK Tag Team Champion.

== Professional wrestling career ==
=== Early career (2007–2013) ===
Smith made his debut in British wrestling on 11 February 2007 with Triple X Wrestling, which he lost to Zack Sabre Jr. He wrestled his last match in the promotion on 7 October, losing to Spud. From 2007 to 2013, Smith wrestled for independent British promotions such as SAS Wrestling, Pro Championship Wrestling, Alternative Wrestling World, One Pro Wrestling, International Pro Wrestling: United Kingdom, Frontier Wrestling Alliance, Pro Evolution Wrestling and Devon Wrestling Association.

=== Preston City Wrestling (2014–2018) ===
Smith debuted at PCW Who Dares Wins on 28 March 2014, competing in a 30-man Royal Rumble for the Preston City Wrestling Heavyweight Championship. Throughout 2015, Smith competed for the PCW Cruiserweight, PCW Tag Team, and PCW Heavyweight titles, but he did not win these titles. While at PCW, Smith had the opportunity to face off against Cedric Alexander and Team War Machine (Hanson and Ray Rowe). On 9 December 2016, Smith challenged and defeated reigning champion Bubblegum to win the PCW Cruiserweight Championship for the first time. On 17 June 2017, Smith lost the title to Dean Allmark. During this time, he also performed for other promotions such as FutureShock Wrestling, Grand Pro Wrestling and Insane Championship Wrestling.

=== WWE (2018–2022) ===
Smith debuted on 8 June 2018 during NXT At Download 2018 and competed in a #1 Contenders match for the NXT UK Championship. After defeating Joseph Conners, he progressed one round. He returned two nights later and teamed with Dave Mastiff to defeat the Forgotten Sons (Steve Cutler and Wesley Blake). On 18 June, he was eliminated from the tournament after losing to Travis Banks. He made his debut for NXT UK on 28 July. Since then he has contested several individual and tag team matches, some of which he was able to win.

On the 2 June 2022 episode of NXT UK, Carter and Smith won the NXT UK Tag Team Championship by defeating previous champions Moustache Mountain (Trent Seven and Tyler Bate) and Die Familie (Teoman and Rohan Raja) in a triple threat match. On the 23 June episode of NXT UK, Carter and Smith were set to defend their titles against NXT 2.0's Josh Briggs and Brooks Jensen, but Smith suffered a knee injury and had to vacate them.

On 18 August 2022, Smith was released from his WWE contract.

== Championships and accomplishments ==
- New Generation Wrestling
  - North West Cup (2015)
- Celtic Wrestling
  - Celtic Wrestling Tag Team Championship (1 time) – with Tyler Browne
- Futureshock Wrestling
  - Futureshock Wrestling Championship (1 time)
  - FutureShock Trophy Winner (2016)
- Grand Pro Wrestling
  - GPW British Championship (1 time)
  - GPW Tag Team Championship (1 time) – with Martin Kirby
- Insane Championship Wrestling
  - ICW Tag Team Championship (2 times) – with Rampage Brown
- SAS Wrestling
  - Prince of Gudjarat Trophy (2008)
- WWE
  - NXT UK Tag Team Championship (1 time) – with Oliver Carter
  - WWE NXT UK Tag Team Title #1 Contendership Tournament (2022) - with Oliver Carter
