= Brooks Jensen =

American professional wrestler

Personal information
- Born: Benjamin Buchanan; August 21, 2001 (age 25) Ranburne, Alabama, U.S.
- Parent: Bull Buchanan (father)

Professional wrestling career
- Ring name(s): Ben Buchanan; Brooks Jensen
- Billed height: 6 ft 5 in (196 cm)
- Billed weight: 243 lb (110 kg)
- Trained by: Bull Buchanan
- Debut: March 2, 2019

Benjamin Buchanan (born August 21, 2001) is an American professional wrestler. He is signed to WWE where he performs on the Evolve brand under the ring name Brooks Jensen. He is a former one-time and the final NXT UK Tag Team Champion.

Buchanan is a second generation wrestler and is the son of Bull Buchanan, who wrestled with the WWE from 1997 until 2003.

== Early life ==
Buchanan was born in 2001 in Ranburne, Alabama and is the son of former WWE wrestler Barry Buchanan, who wrestled in the WWE from 1997 to 2003 under the ring names Bull Buchanan and B^{2}.

== Professional wrestling career ==
=== Early career (2019–2021) ===
Buchanan debuted on March 2, 2019. He went on to work throughout the southern wrestling territories, mostly appearing in promotions in Alabama and Georgia. He became a one-time Heavyweight Champion and a multiple-time Tag Team Champion between 2020 and 2021.

=== WWE (2021–present) ===
==== NXT UK and NXT (2021–2025) ====
It was announced on August 30, 2021, Buchanan was one of six athletes signed to report to the WWE Performance Center. He made his in ring debut on the September 14 episode of NXT 2.0 as Brooks Jensen, teaming with fellow NXT rookie Josh Briggs in a tag match against Imperium (Marcel Barthel and Fabian Aichner). They would work as a tag team during the following month, participating in the 2022 Dusty Rhodes Tag Team Classic tournament and had two matches for the NXT Tag Team Championship, but they didn't win the tournament nor the titles. On June 22 taping of NXT UK, they would make their debut in the NXT UK brand in a fatal four-way tag team elimination match to win the vacant NXT UK Tag Team Championship, making them the first and only non-European tag team to win the titles, as well as the first ever male superstar born in the 2000s to win a championship in WWE. At Worlds Collide on September 4, Pretty Deadly (Elton Prince and Kit Wilson) defeated Jensen and Briggs, NXT Tag Team Champions Creed Brothers (Brutus Creed and Julius Creed), and Gallus (Mark Coffey and Wolfgang) in a fatal four-way tag team elimination match to unify the NXT UK Tag Team Championship into the NXT Tag Team Championship, ending Jensen and Briggs' reign at 73 days while being recognized as the final NXT UK Tag Team Champions.

On April 1, 2023, at NXT Stand & Deliver, Jensen refused to give Kiana James her handbag to cheat and caused James and Fallon Henley to lose the NXT Women's Tag Team Championship to Alba Fyre and Isla Dawn. On the April 11 episode of NXT, Jensen shoves Briggs on the floor causing Henley and James to lose their title rematch against Fyre and Dawn. On the April 25 episode of Spring Breakin', Jensen and James were defeated by Briggs and Henley in a mixed tag team match. After the match, James walked out on Jensen causing him to go back to Briggs and Henley. On the December 27 episode of NXT, Briggs, Henley and Jensen agreed to go their separate ways, splitting up the team.

On June 21, 2024, Jensen posted on X that he was (kayfabe) released by WWE, which began a storyline where he wasn't working for the company. Jensen has subsequently appeared on indie events at this time, and he has also appeared in the background of NXT arena to target Senior Vice President of Talent Development Creative Shawn Michaels. He was also seen intruding the WWE Performance Center during tapings of NXT. On the July 9 episode of NXT, Jensen had a sit down with NXT General Manager Ava, who agreed to give Jensen a second chance after Briggs vouched for Jensen. Moments later, he was seen attacking Je'Von Evans backstage. On the following week, Jensen was defeated by Evans. After the match, Jensen attacked Evans and was stopped by Briggs, to which Jensen challenged Briggs to a No Disqualification match where Jenson won after interference from Shawn Spears. On the August 13 episode of NXT, Jensen acknowledged Spears as his mentor, solidifying his heel turn for the first time in his career. On the October 15 episode of NXT, Jensen, now a full-fledged ally of Shawn Spears faced Ashante "Thee" Adonis in a winning effort. Jensen and Spears later added Izzi Dame and Niko Vance to their alliance and formed The Culling. On the June 3, 2025 episode of NXT, Jensen was kicked out of The Culling, by Izzi reasons being that he lost them the match at Battleground, and believed Tatum Paxley was a more valuable asset to the group.

==== Evolve (2025–present) ====
On the July 16, 2025 episode of Evolve, Jensen made his debut for the Evolve brand and attacked Evolve Champion Jackson Drake of The Vanity Project stable. On the following week, Jensen made his Evolve match debut where he lost to Drake's stablemates Swipe Right (Brad Baylor and Ricky Smokes) in a tag team match after he abandoned Jordan Oasis, his tag team partner for the match.

== Championships and accomplishments ==
- Anarchy Wrestling
  - Anarchy Tag Team Championship (2 times) – with Bull Buchanan (1) and Griff Garrison (1)
- Pro Wrestling Illustrated
  - Ranked No. 377 of the top singles wrestlers in the PWI 500 in 2026
- Southern Fried Championship Wrestling
  - SFCW Tag Team Championship (1 time) – with Bull Buchanan
- Victory Championship Wrestling
  - VCW Heavyweight Championship (1 time)
- WWE
  - NXT UK Tag Team Championship (1 time, final) – with Josh Briggs
