= Los Americanos =

Professional wrestling stable

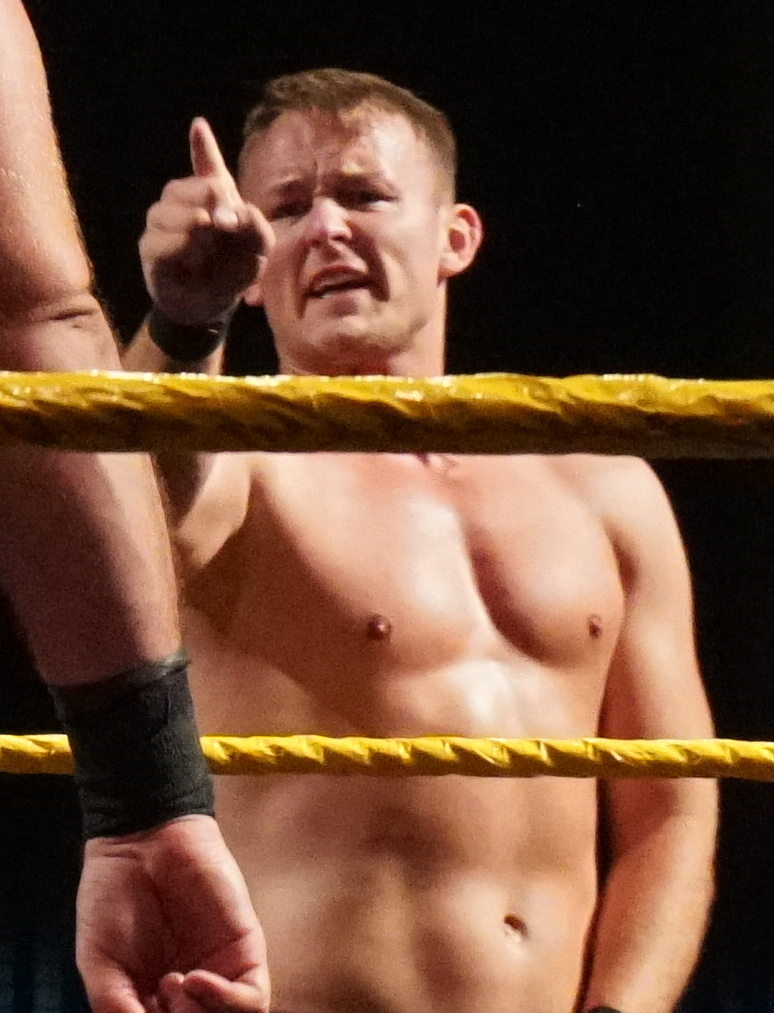
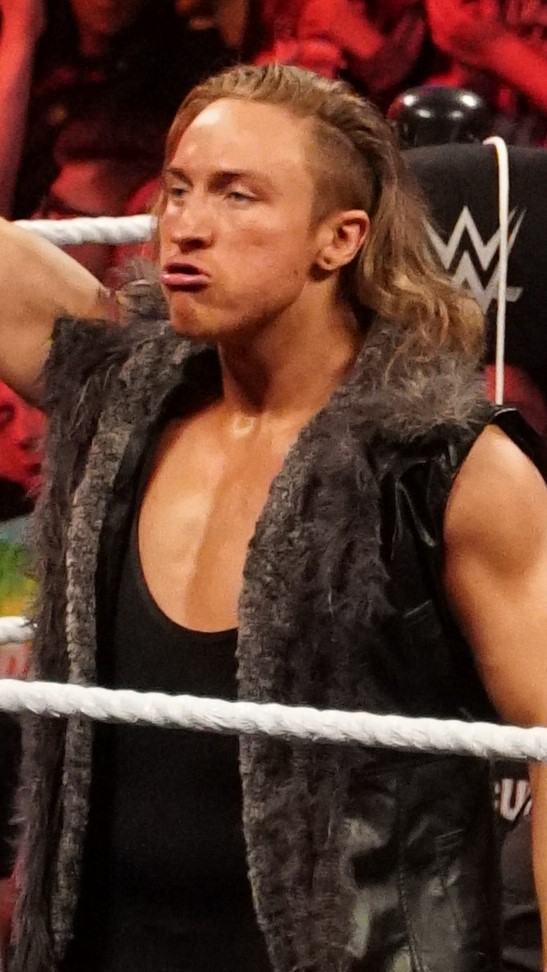
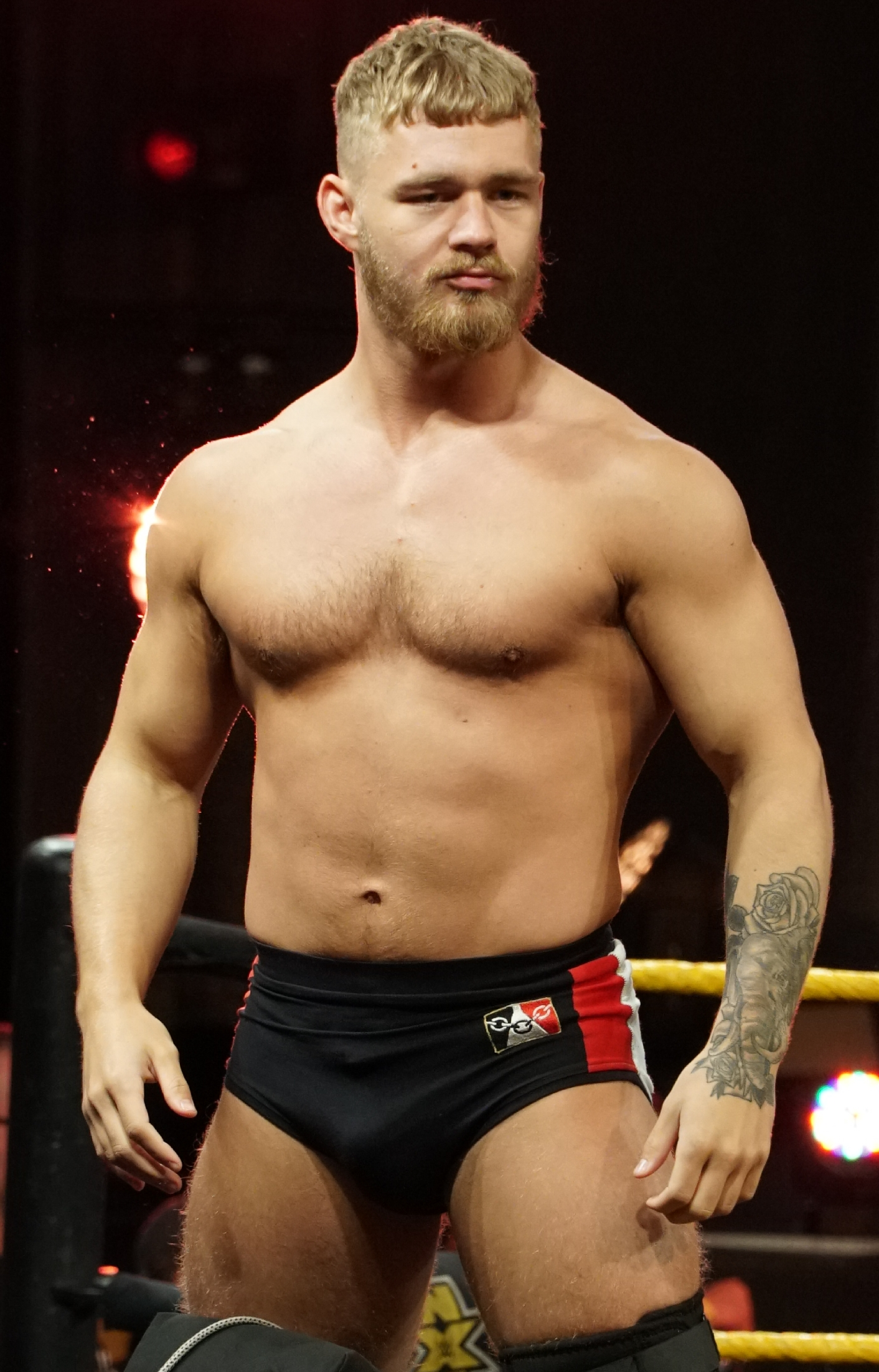
- Ludwig Kaiser (left), Pete Dunne (center) and Tyler Bate (right)

Tag team
- Members: Ludwig Kaiser / El Grande Americano; Pete Dunne / Rayo Americano; Tyler Bate / Bravo Americano
- Name(s): British Strong Style; House Strong Style; New Catch Republic; Los Americanos
- Billed heights: Dunne: 1.80 m (5 ft 11 in); Seven: 1.83 m (6 ft 0 in); Bate: 1.70 m (5 ft 7 in)
- Combined billed weight: 172 kg (380 lb)
- Billed from: Moustache Mountain; United Kingdom
- Former members: Trent Seven
- Debut: 31 July 2016
- Years active: 2016–2022; 2024–present

Los Americanos is a professional wrestling stable consisting of Ludwig Kaiser, Pete Dunne and Tyler Bate. The group is signed to WWE where they perform on the Raw and NXT brands and sister company Lucha Libre AAA Worldwide (AAA) under the ring names El Grande Americano, Rayo Americano and Bravo Americano. Kaiser is the current AAA Mega Champion in his first reign. Dunne also serves as a producer for AAA.

The group was originally known as British Strong Style and was made up of Dunne, Bate, and Trent Seven, who last worked for WWE in the NXT UK brand, before his release in August 2022. The group took its name from a style of professional wrestling that is a mixture of Japanese strong style and traditional British catch wrestling. The three were a prominent part of the NXT UK roster, and were central figures of the NXT UK programme when it premiered in October 2018. They were nicknamed "the founding fathers of NXT UK" by WWE, due to their crucial part in the creation and growth of the brand.

Dunne and Seven formed the group in the Progress Wrestling (Progress) promotion in July 2016 as a tag team, before adding Bate, who had been Seven's tag team partner as part of Moustache Mountain since April 2015, in November 2016. The group dominated Progress over the following year with Dunne holding the PROGRESS World Championship and Bate and Seven the PROGRESS Tag Team Championship. Though primarily appearing in Progress, the stable has also worked for several other promotions in the United Kingdom, including Chikara, where they won the 2017 King of Trios tournament.

Through a partnership between Progress and WWE, all three members of British Strong Style also appeared for WWE since 2017, with Bate defeating Dunne in the finals of the first United Kingdom Championship Tournament to become the inaugural WWE United Kingdom Champion. Dunne won the title from Bate later that year. During Dunne's UK Championship reign, Seven and Bate were NXT Tag Team Champions for a short time in June 2018, making all three members champions in WWE for a short period. Seven would be released from WWE in August 2022, after which Dunne and Bate would begin teaming together in early 2024 after Bate was moved to the SmackDown brand, and the team took on the new name of New Catch Republic.

== History ==
=== Progress Wrestling (2016–2019) ===
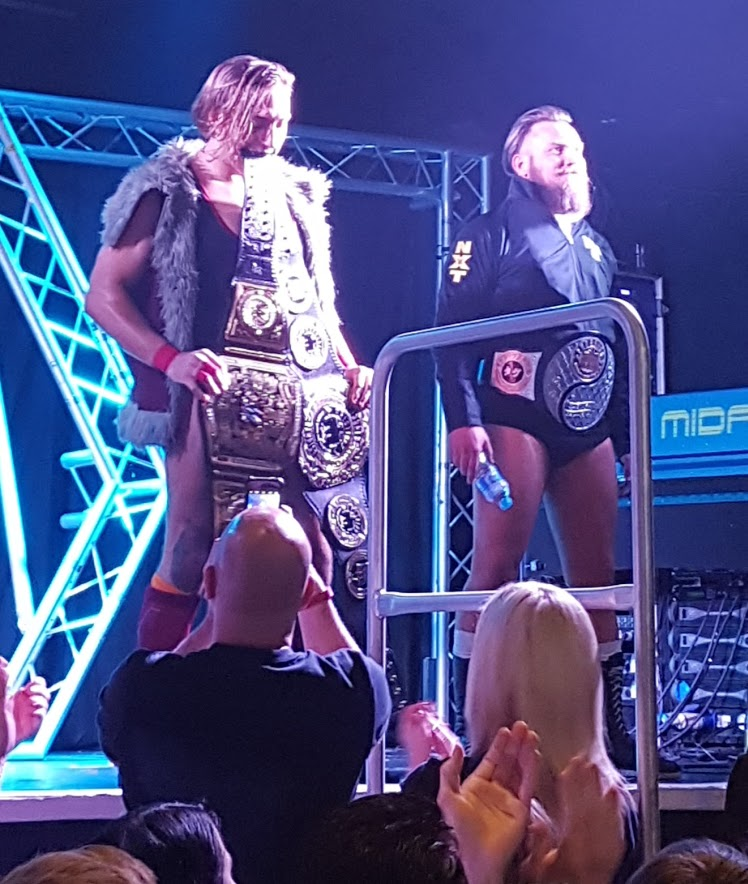
Pete Dunne (left) and Trent Seven (right), who formed the group in July 2016

On 31 July 2016, the Dunne Brothers (Damian Dunne and Pete Dunne) were set to take on Moustache Mountain (Trent Seven and Tyler Bate) at Progress Wrestling's event in London, England. The match ended with Pete and Seven turning on their partners and walking off together, signaling the start of a new partnership, which they subsequently dubbed "British Strong Style". On 25 September, Dunne and Seven defeated the London Riots (James Davis and Rob Lynch) for the PROGRESS Tag Team Championship. On 27 November, Dunne and Seven took part in a seven-man elimination match for the vacant PROGRESS World Championship. The match came down to Dunne, Seven and Jimmy Havoc. After Havoc managed to eliminate Seven from the match, he was attacked by both Seven and Dunne, which brought out Tyler Bate, seemingly to exact revenge on Seven. Bate, however, turned on Havoc, helping Dunne become the new Progress World Champion and turning British Strong Style into a trio. Bate and Dunne were positioned as the spotlight wrestlers of the group, while Seven became its mouthpiece.

After capturing the Progress World Championship, Dunne attempted to pass his half of the PROGRESS Tag Team Championship to Bate, which led to Progress management stripping British Strong Style of the tag team title. They did however allow Bate and Seven to wrestle for the vacant title, leading to a match on 30 December, where the two defeated the London Riots and LDRS (Marty Scurll and Zack Sabre Jr.) to become the new champions.

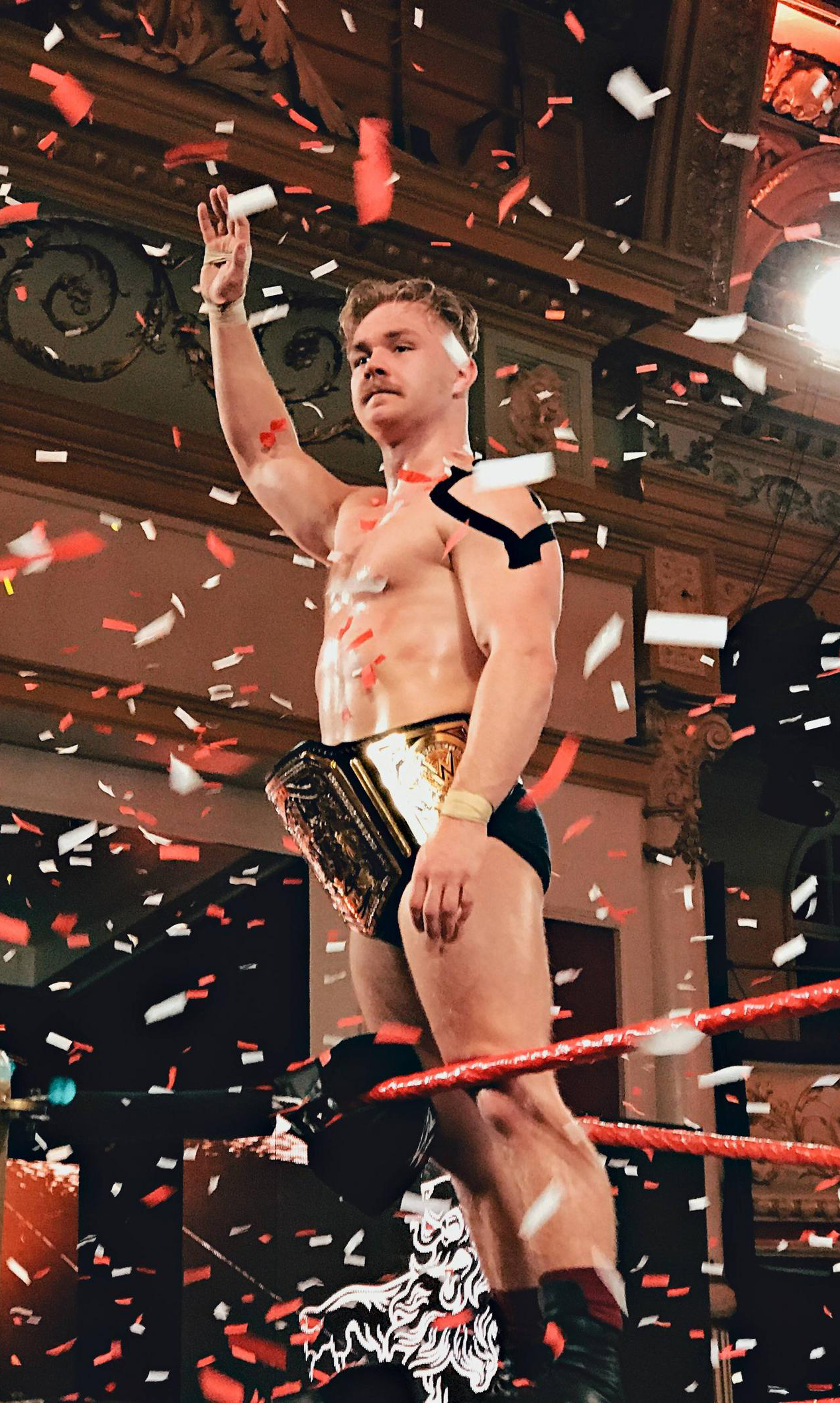
Tyler Bate after winning the United Kingdom Championship Tournament

In January 2017, all three members of British Strong Style took part in a tournament held by WWE to crown the inaugural WWE United Kingdom Championship. The trio were not acknowledged by WWE, instead Bate and Seven were referred to by the Moustache Mountain name, with Dunne being positioned opposite the two as the main villain of the tournament. The tournament eventually came down to Bate and Dunne in the finals with Bate emerging victorious to become the first WWE United Kingdom Champion. After a four-month reign, Bate lost the title to Dunne at NXT TakeOver: Chicago. While WWE did not recognize British Strong Style as a stable, the WWE United Kingdom Championship was entered into storylines involving the group in Progress. The trio's participation in the tournament was also added to their villainous act in Progress with the members wearing NXT jackets, playing up the fact that they were under WWE contracts and promising they were going to leave Progress with the promotion's two championships.

On 23 April, British Strong Style faced off against the Ringkampf stable of Axel Dieter Jr., Timothy Thatcher and Walter from the German Westside Xtreme Wrestling (wXw) promotion in a six-man tag team match, where both of their Progress titles were on the line. The match ended with Seven pinning Walter for the win, meaning that British Strong Style continued both of their title reigns. The following month, British Strong Style found themselves new rivals in the #CCK stable of Chris Brookes, Kid Lykos and Travis Banks, who debuted by interrupting their attack on Matt Riddle. This led to a match on 25 June, where Bate and Seven lost the PROGRESS Tag Team Championship to Brookes and Lykos. On 9 July, British Strong Style and #CCK faced off in a 6-man tag team match, where Brookes & Lykos agreed to put the PROGRESS Tag Team Championship on the line with the added stipulation that if British Strong Style did not win the match, they could never again challenge for the title. British Strong Style ended up cheating their way to a victory, making Bate & Seven the new Progress Tag Team Champions.

On 10 September, British Strong Style lost both of their Progress titles to members of #CCK with Bate & Seven losing the Tag Team Championship to Brookes and Lykos in a ladder match, while Dunne lost the World Championship to Travis Banks, ending the group's ten-month domination over Progress. Following the loss of their titles, British Strong Style turned face with Dunne apologising for some of his actions as champion. At Chapter 76, Seven defeated Doug Williams to win the Progress Wrestling Atlas Championship. At Chapter 82, a rematch of the WWE United Kingdom Championship match from NXT TakeOver: Chicago between Dunne and Bate was the main event. Dunne defeated Bate in what ring announcer and co-owner Jim Smallman said was the duos farewell match, implying both seemingly were going full-time with NXT UK & WWE.

=== Chikara (2017) ===
On 1 September 2017, British Strong Style, billed as "House Strong Style", entered the 2017 King of Trios tournament, hosted by the American Chikara promotion in Wolverhampton. After defeating House Whitewolf (A-Kid, Adam Chase & Zayas) in their first round match, House Throwbacks (Dasher Hatfield, Mark Angelosetti & Simon Grimm) in the quarterfinals, & house rot (Frightmare, Hallowicked & Kobald) via forfeit in the semifinals, House Strong Style advanced to the finals of the tournament, where, on 3 September, they defeated House Sendai Girls (Cassandra Miyagi, Dash Chisako & Meiko Satomura) to become the 2017 King of Trios.

=== WWE ===
==== NXT UK (2018–2022) ====
After Roderick Strong turned on Pete Dunne at NXT TakeOver: New Orleans, Dunne teased a return of the stable in WWE on Instagram days later. In April during WrestleMania Axxess weekend, Bate and Seven lost an NXT Tag Team Championship match to Strong and Kyle O'Reilly. After the match, they were attacked by The Undisputed Era until Dunne made the save, thus reuniting for the first time in WWE. It was later announced that Dunne, Bate and Seven would take on The Undisputed Era on the first night of the second annual United Kingdom Championship Tournament in June 2018.

British Strong Style won their match against The Undisputed Era on 18 June. The following night, Bate & Seven defeated O'Reilly and Strong to win the NXT Tag Team Championship for the first time, whilst Dunne retained his WWE United Kingdom Championship against tournament winner Zack Gibson, meaning that all members of British Strong Style were now champions in WWE. However, Bate & Seven lost the titles back to O'Reilly & Strong 2 days later. At NXT TakeOver: Brooklyn 4, Bate and Seven failed to regain their titles against The Undisputed Era while Dunne retained his title against Gibson once again. The group disbanded in late July 2022 after Trent Seven was released from his WWE contract.

==== Main roster (2024–2025) ====
Tyler Bate was promoted to the SmackDown brand and reunited with Pete Dunne, fresh off his run as Butch of the Brawling Brutes; Bate helped Dunne recover his original name, before they defeated Pretty Deadly in a tag team match at SmackDown: New Year's Revolution on 5 January 2024. On the 16 February episode of SmackDown, the team was renamed to New Catch Republic. New Catch Republic won the Undisputed WWE Tag Team Championship Contender Series for an Undisputed WWE Tag Team Championship match at Elimination Chamber: Perth but failed to defeat The Judgment Day (Finn Bálor and Damian Priest) for the titles at the event. New Catch Republic battled in a six-pack tag team ladder match for the Undisputed WWE Tag Team Championship at Night 1 of WrestleMania XL but failed to win any of the tag titles.

At Night 2 of the 2024 WWE Draft, New Catch Republic were drafted to the Raw brand in the supplemental draft. At Week 2 of Spring Breakin', New Catch Republic returned to NXT to assist Axiom and Nathan Frazer retain the NXT Tag Team Championship against The Final Testament's Authors of Pain (AOP). In July, Bate was reportedly sidelined for a torn pectoral muscle after he suffered an injury, putting the team on hiatus. New Catch Republic reunited on the March 31, 2025 edition of Raw after Bate returned from injury in a losing effort against The New Day (Kofi Kingston and Xavier Woods)

==== Los Americanos (2025–present) ====
On the July 28, 2025 episode of Raw, a third El Grande Americano (the masked wrestler gimmick had been previously portrayed by Chad Gable and Ludwig Kaiser) debuted during a World Tag Team Championship match between The Judgment Day (Finn Bálor and JD McDonagh) defending the titles against LWO (Joaquin Wilde and Cruz Del Toro), costing LWO the match. The following week on Raw, where Dominik Mysterio was facing Dragon Lee, a fourth El Grande Americano debuted, costing Lee the match. The third and fourth El Grande Americanos were then revealed to be Dunne and Bate under the new names Rayo Americano and Bravo Americano respectively. Rayo and Bravo then joined Kaiser's El Grande Americano variant as Los Americanos.

== Championships and accomplishments ==
- Attack! Pro Wrestling
  - Attack! 24/7 Championship (2 times) – Bate (1), Dunne (1)
  - Attack! Tag Team Championship (1 time) – Bate and Seven
- Chikara
  - Chikara Campeonatos de Parejas (1 time) – Bate and Seven
  - King of Trios (2017) - Bate, Dunne and Seven
- Destiny World Wrestling
  - DWW Championship (1 time) – Dunne
- Fight Club:Pro
  - FCP Championship (1 time) – Dunne
  - FCP Tag Team Championship (2 time) – Bate and Seven
- FutureShock Wrestling
  - FSW Adrenaline Championship (1 time) – Dunne
- Insane Championship Wrestling
  - ICW World Heavyweight Championship (1 time) – Seven
- International Wrestling Syndicate
  - IWS World Tag Team Championship (1 time) – Bate and Seven
- Kamikaze Pro
  - Relentless Division Championship (1 time) – Bate
- Lucha Libre AAA Worldwide
  - AAA Mega Championship (1 time, current) – Kaiser
  - Rey de Reyes (2026) – Kaiser
- Over the Top Wrestling
  - OTT No Limits Championship (1 time) – Dunne
  - OTT Tag Team Championship (1 time) – Bate, Dunne and Seven
- Pro Wrestling Revolver
  - PWR Tag Team Championship (1 time) - Dunne with Millie McKenzie
- Progress Wrestling
  - PROGRESS Tag Team Championship (3 times) – Dunne and Seven (1), Bate and Seven (2)
  - PROGRESS World Championship (1 time) – Dunne
  - Progress Wrestling Atlas Championship (1 time) - Seven
- Pro Wrestling Illustrated
  - Ranked Dunne No. 29 of the top 500 singles wrestlers in the PWI 500 in 2017
  - Ranked Bate No. 50 of the top 500 singles wrestlers in the PWI 500 in 2017
  - Ranked Seven No. 168 of the top 500 singles wrestlers in the PWI 500 in 2018
- Revolution Pro Wrestling
  - RPW Undisputed British Tag Team Championship (1 time) – Bate and Seven
- VII Pro Wrestling
  - VII Pro Championship (1 time) – Dunne
- Westside Xtreme Wrestling
  - wXw Shotgun Championship (2 times) – Dunne (1), Bate (1)
- WWE
  - NXT Tag Team Championship (2 times) – Bate and Seven (1), Dunne with Matt Riddle (1)
  - NXT UK Tag Team Championship (1 time) – Bate and Seven
  - NXT UK Heritage Cup (1 time) – Bate
  - WWE United Kingdom Championship (3 times) – Bate (2), Dunne (1)
  - United Kingdom Championship Tournament (2017) – Bate
  - NXT Tag Team Championship Invitational (2018) – Bate and Seven
  - Dusty Rhodes Tag Team Classic (2020) – Dunne with Matt Riddle
  - Undisputed WWE Tag Team Championship Contender Series (2024) – Dunne and Bate
  - WWE Speed Championship #1 Contender Tournament (May 8 – 24, 2024) – Bate
  - WWE Speed Championship #1 Contender Tournament (July 31 – August 30, 2024) – Dunne
  - NXT Tag Team Championship #1 Contender's Tournament (2026) – Rayo Americano and Bravo Americano
  - NXT Year-End Award (1 time)
    - Match of the Year (2017) – Bate vs Dunne for the WWE United Kingdom Championship at NXT TakeOver: Chicago
