= Flash Morgan Webster =

Welsh professional wrestler (born 1990)

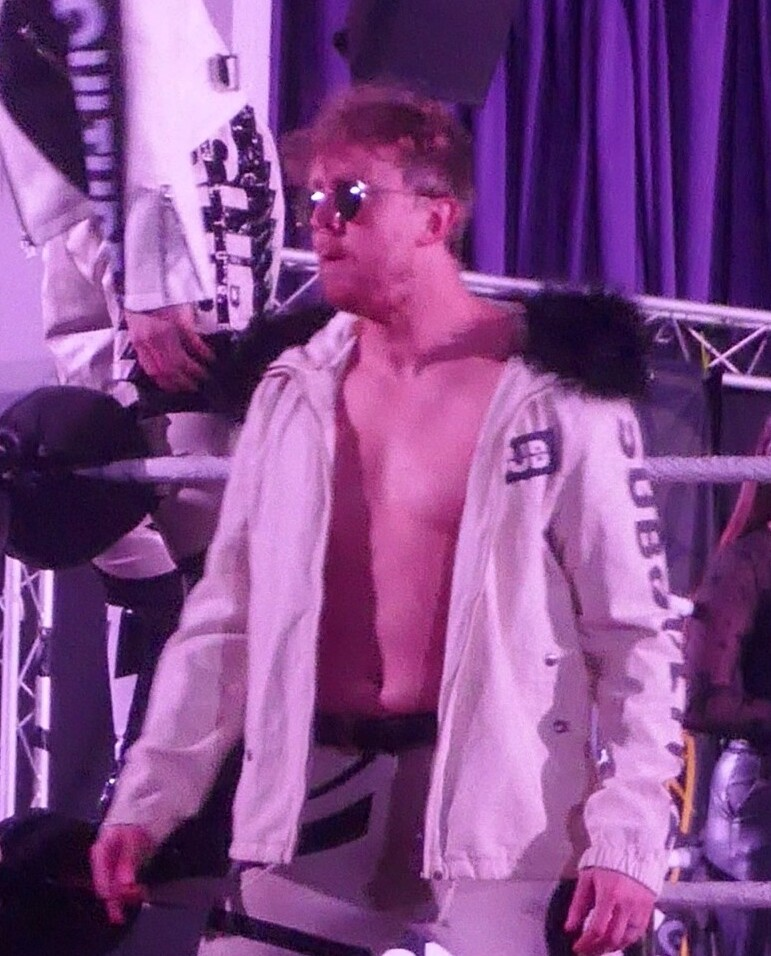
- Webster in March 2026

Personal information
- Born: Gavin Watkins; 13 April 1990 (age 36) Brynmawr, Blaenau Gwent, Wales

Professional wrestling career
- Ring name(s): Flash Morgan "Flash" Morgan Webster; Kevin McCallister; Morgan Webster
- Billed height: 5 ft 9 in (173 cm)
- Billed weight: 165 lb (75 kg)
- Billed from: Brynmawr, Wales
- Debut: 2010

Gavin Watkins (born 13 April 1990), better known by the ring name Flash Morgan Webster, is a Welsh professional wrestler, currently performing on the British independent scene and for RevPro, where he is a former Undisputed British Cruiserweight Champion and a former Undisputed British Tag Team Champion (with Mark Andrews).

Webster previously wrestled in WWE, where he and Andrews were the first Welsh Champions in WWE history during their reign as NXT UK Tag Team Champions. He is also known for his appearances in Attack! Pro Wrestling, Progress Wrestling, Southside Wrestling Entertainment and Pro Wrestling Guerrilla among others.

== Professional wrestling career ==
=== Independent circuit (2010–2018, 2022–present) ===
In 2010, Webster made his debut for Welsh Wrestling, losing to Wild Boar. In March 2011, Morgan and Mark Andrews defeated Method And Madness for Celtic Wrestling. In June 2011, Morgan debuted for Phoenix Pro Wrestling, teaming with Pete Dunne in which they were defeated by Paul Malen and Joseph Conners. In 2013, at a Pro Wrestling Kingdom event, Webster defeated El Ligero. In 2014, Webster was defeated by Marty Scurll and Tommy End. On 19 September 2014 Webster made his Southside Wrestling Entertainment debut at The Hunt is On, where he, Dan Moloney and Tyler Bate defeated Jonathan Gresham, Chris Brookes and Nixon Newell. On 25 January 2014, Morgan teamed with Ryan Smile for Infinite Promotions and the Union of European Wrestling Alliances in an effort to qualify for a tournament for the Infinite Promotions Tag Team Championships but were eliminated by Davey Blaze and Andy Wild.

In late 2014 at SWE Opportunity Knocks, Morgan and El Ligero were defeated by Uhaa Nation. In 2015, at SWE Day Of Reckoning 5, Webster was defeated by Mark Haskins. In 2015, he defeated Will Ospreay. In October 2015, Webster was defeated by Tommaso Ciampa. In December 2015, he was defeated by Zack Sabre Jr. In 2016, he was defeated by Angélico.

=== Attack! Pro Wrestling (2011–2015, 2023–present) ===
In 2011, Flash Morgan made his Attack! Pro Wrestling debut where he, Kid Lykos and Chris Brookes were defeated by Kev Dunphy in a fatal four-way. In October 2012, Flash Morgan defeated Jim Hunter. In February 2013, at ATTACK! Press Start, Webster was defeated by Pete Dunne in a ladder match. In 2015, Webster defeated Super Santos Sr.

=== Progress Wrestling (2013–2018) ===
In 2013, Webster made his Progress Wrestling debut at ENDVR:2, defeating William Eaver. At Chapter 11, Webster defeated Josh Bodom in the quarter-finals of the 2nd Natural Progression Series. At Chapter 15 in the semi-finals, webster defeated Pete Dunne. At Chapter 17, Webster defeated Zack Gibson in the finals. At Chapter 18, he defeated Bubblegum. At Chapter 29, he was defeated by Zack Sabre Jr in a WWE Cruiserweight Classic qualifying match. At Chapter 44, Webster, Mark Haskins and Jimmy Havoc defeated British Strong Style. At Chapter 48, Webster defeated James Drake to qualify for the Super Strong Style 16 2017 tournament. At the event, Webster was defeated in the first round by Mark Haskins. At Chapter 50, Webster wrestled Jack Sexsmith to a no contest as both wrestlers were attacked by Chief Deputy Dunne. At Chapter 51, Webster was defeated by Dunne. At Chapter 55, Webster participate in an 8 way Scramble number one contender match for the Progress World Championship, the match was ultimately won by Mark Andrews. At Chapter 57, Webster was defeated by Keith Lee.

On Chapter 64, Webster won the Thunderbastard match thus earning a future Progress World Championship match that he got on Chapter 65, where he was defeated by the champion Travis Banks. Following that, he made an alliance with Mark Haskins and Jimmy Havoc, the trio went to defeat David Starr, Matt Riddle and Keith Lee at Chapter 67. At Chapter 68, Webster was again defeated by Keith Lee in the first round of the 2018 Super Strong Style 16.

=== Revolution Pro Wrestling (2015–2017, 2022–present) ===
Webster made his Revolution Pro Wrestling debut in 2015, defeating Wild Boar. In August 2015, he was defeated by P. J. Black. On 2 January 2016 Webster enter in a tournament for the vacant RevPro British Cruiserweight Championship, defeating Josh Bodom in the semifinal but losing to Pete Dunne in the finals. On 16 January Webster unsuccessfully challenged Dunne for the championship. In December 2017, Webster defeated Ryan Smile to win the RevPro British Cruiserweight Championship, however he drop the title 5 days later against Kurtis Chapman in a five-way match.

=== Pro Wrestling Guerrilla (2017–2018) ===
Webster made his debut for PWG at 2017 Battle of Los Angeles, being eliminated by Marty Scurll on the first round. At PWG All Star Weekend 13 night one, he defeated Brian Cage, but lost to the Young Bucks along with Mark Haskins at night two. At PWG Mystery Vortex V, he was defeated by Joey Janela. At PWG All Star Weekend 14, he was defeated by Sammy Guevara in a triple threat match that also included Robbie Eagles on night one and by Trevor Lee on night two.

=== WWE (2018–2022) ===
Webster made his WWE debut at WrestleMania Axxess in 2018, being defeated by Pete Dunne. On 18 May it was announced that Webster would be a participant in the 2018 United Kingdom Championship Tournament. He would defeat Jordan Devlin in the quarter-finals before being eliminated by eventual tournament winner, Zack Gibson. The following night, Webster, Travis Banks and Mark Andrews were defeated in a WWE United Kingdom Championship number one contenders match by the returning Noam Dar.

Webster made his 205 Live debut teaming with Cedric Alexander and Mustafa Ali where they defeated James Drake, Joseph Conners and Drew Gulak.

In a triple threat tag team match at NXT UK TakeOver: Cardiff, Webster along with Mark Andrews captured the NXT UK Tag Team Championship after defeating James Drake and Zack Gibson to win the title.

In June 2021, vignettes started appearing on WWE social media and NXTUK programming featuring Webster, his then tag team partner Andrews and stand out women wrestler Dani Luna. The vignettes would focus on each of the individual's unique looks and passions for their music genres. In the coming weeks, the group would be given a new entrance theme and begin working together under the name Subculture.

On 18 August 2022, Webster was released from his WWE contract.

=== Impact / Total Nonstop Action Wrestling (2023–2024) ===
On the 12 May 2023 episode of Impact!, it was announced that Webster and Mark Andrews (accompanied by Dani Luna) will challenge the Impact World Tag Team Champions ABC (Ace Austin and Chris Bey). On 26 May at Under Siege, Webster and Andrews failed to win the titles from ABC. It was later on announced that Webster and Andrew would return to Impact to participate in a four-way match for the World Tag Team Championship against ABC, Brian Myers and Moose, and Rich Swann and Sami Callihan at Slammiversary of year 2023. During this match the two were successful. They lost the titles to The Rascalz (Trey Miguel and Zachary Wentz) six weeks later at Emergence.

== Wrestling persona and style ==
Webster's wrestling attire is based on the mod subculture that was widely popular in 1960s Great Britain. Webster is often referred to as The MODfather of Professional Wrestling. He mainly performs a high-flying style but also wrestles a traditional European technical wrestling style.

== Championships and accomplishments ==
- Attack! Pro Wrestling
  - ATTACK! Championship (1 time)
  - ATTACK! 24:7 Championship (1 time)
- Unlimited Wrestling
  - Unlimited Tag Team championship (1 time)– with Mark Andrews
- Dragon Pro Wrestling
  - Dragon Pro Tag Team Championship (1 time) – with Wild Boar
- Coventry Pro Wrestling
  - CPW Heavyweight Championship (1 time)
- HOPE Wrestling
  - HOPE Kings Of Flight Championship (1 time)
- Impact Wrestling
  - Impact World Tag Team Championship (1 time) – with Mark Andrews
- Progress Wrestling
  - Natural Progression Series II (2014–2015)
- Pro Wrestling Chaos
  - King Of Chaos Championship (1 time)
- Pro Wrestling Illustrated
  - Ranked No. 300 of the top 500 wrestlers in the PWI 500 in 2018
- Revolution Pro Wrestling
  - RPW British Cruiserweight Championship (1 time)
  - British Tag Team Championship (1 time) – with Mark Andrews
- WWE
  - NXT UK Tag Team Championship (1 time) – with Mark Andrews
