= Josh Briggs =

American professional wrestler (born 1993)

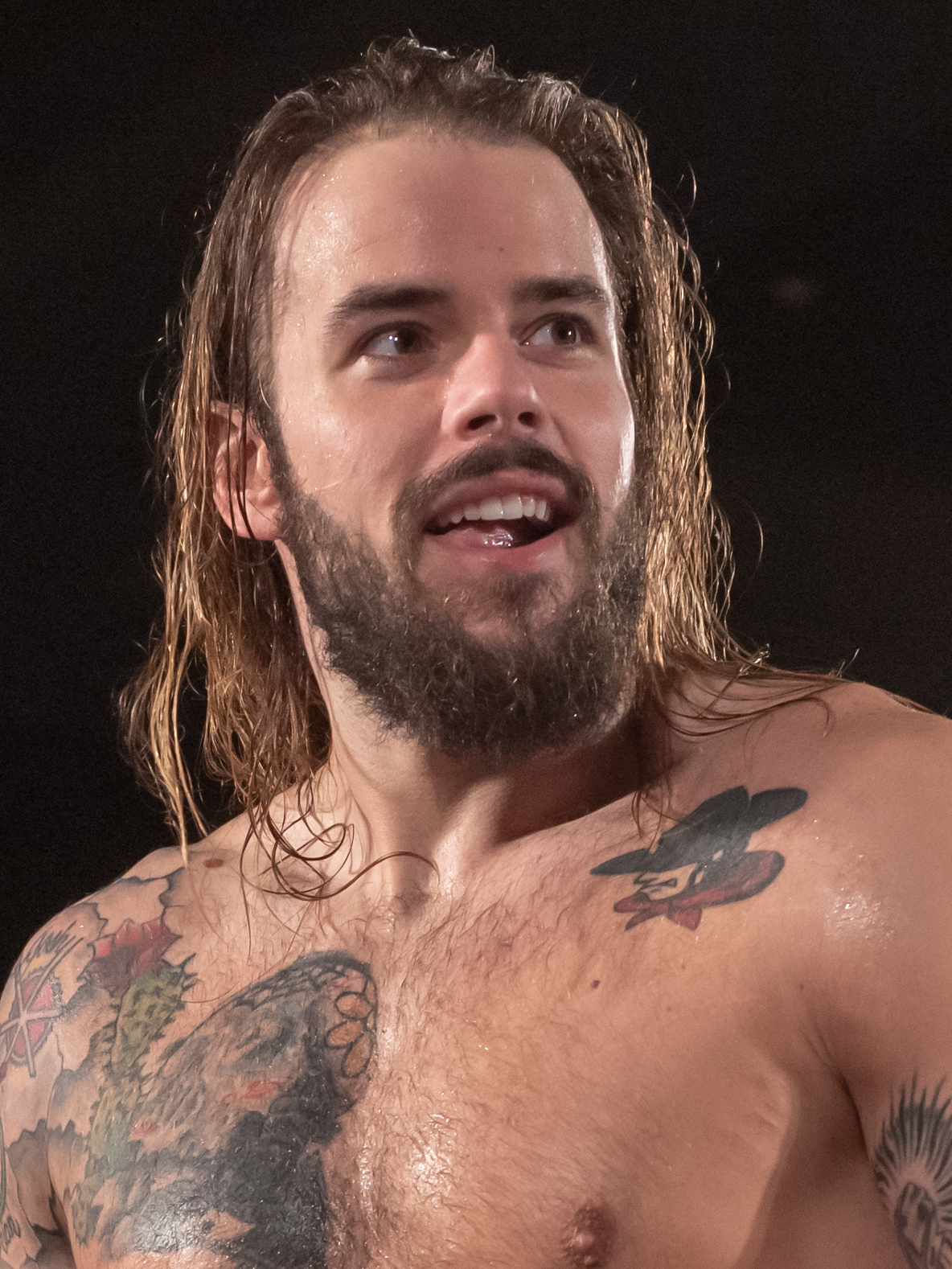
- Briggs in 2019

Personal information
- Born: Joshua Bruns; March 5, 1993 (age 33) Bullhead City, Arizona, U.S.

Professional wrestling career
- Ring name: Josh Briggs
- Billed height: 6 ft 8 in (203 cm)
- Billed weight: 290 lb (132 kg)
- Billed from: Nothing, Arizona
- Trained by: Brian Fury; Mike Hollow; Matt Bloom; Shawn Michaels; Steve Corino; Norman Smiley
- Debut: December 14, 2016

Joshua Bruns (born March 5, 1993) is an American professional wrestler, better known by his ring name Josh Briggs. He is signed to WWE where he performs on the NXT brand. He was a one-time and the final NXT UK Tag Team Champion.

Bruns previously performed for the original Evolve promotion, where he was a one-time and the final Evolve Champion at the time of the original promotion's closure.

== Early life ==
Bruns accepted a scholarship to play college football for the UMass Minutemen after two years at Glendale Community College in Arizona.

== Professional wrestling career ==
=== WWE (2020–present) ===
==== Teaming with Brooks Jensen (2020–2023) ====
On August 31, 2020, it was reported that Briggs had signed a contract with WWE, following the company's purchase of Evolve in July. On October 7, WWE announced that he had reported for training at the Performance Center, alongside five other professional wrestlers from Evolve. On July 6, 2021, Briggs was announced to be a part of the 2021 NXT Breakout Tournament. On the July 27 episode of NXT, Briggs was defeated by Carmelo Hayes in the first round. On the NXT 2.0 premiere on September 14, Briggs formed a tag team with the debuting Brooks Jensen and faced Imperium (Fabian Aichner and Marcel Barthel) in a losing effort, establishing themselves as faces. On the January 18, 2022 episode of NXT, Briggs and Jensen competed in the Dusty Rhodes Men's Tag Team Classic, but were eliminated by eventual winners the Creed Brothers (Brutus and Julius) in the first round. On the April 12 episode of NXT, they took part in a five-team gauntlet match for the vacant NXT Tag Team Championship, but failed to win. On the June 22 episode of NXT UK, Briggs and Jensen defeated Dave Mastiff and Jack Starz, Mark Andrews and Wild Boar, and Die Familie (Teoman and Rohan Raja) in a Fatal 4-Way elimination match to win the vacant NXT UK Tag Team Championship, making them the first and only non-European tag team to win the titles.

==== Singles competition (2023–2024) ====
On the December 27, 2023 episode of NXT, Briggs, Brooks Jensen and Fallon Henley agree to go their separate ways splitting up the team. On the January 16, 2024 episode of NXT, Briggs received an endorsement from John "Bradshaw" Layfield in a backstage segment. The following week, Briggs took on Trick Williams in a losing effort. After the match, Briggs attacked Williams with a clothesline, thus turning heel. On the February 6 episode of NXT, Briggs seemingly consoled his former partner Jensen about having to work alone, only to then badmouth him and tell him to grow up, thus cementing his heel turn. On the February 20 episode of NXT, Briggs defeated Jensen in a singles match and consoled him after by saying "I did this for you, I love you man", turning back into a face once again. At NXT Roadblock, Briggs would try to talk Jensen out of taking a match with Oba Femi but Jensen was persistent on facing Femi and would be ultimately defeated the following week with Briggs watching at ringside. At NXT Stand & Deliver on April 6, Briggs failed to win the NXT North American Championship from Femi in a triple threat match which also included Dijak. On the July 9 episode of NXT, Briggs reunited with Jensen after Briggs vouched for Jensen, who had been trespassing the WWE Performance Center on tapings of NXT after being (kayfabe) released from WWE, to get his job back. Moments later, Jensen was seen attacking Je'Von Evans backstage. On the following week, Jensen was defeated by Evans. After the match, Jensen attacked Evans and was stopped by Briggs, to which Jensen challenged Briggs to a No Disqualification match where Jensen won after interference from Shawn Spears.

==== Teaming with Yoshiki Inamura (2024–2025) ====
After his excursion to Pro Wrestling Noah, Briggs formed a tag team with Noah's Yoshiki Inamura. On the November 12 episode of NXT, Briggs and Inamura entered a battle royal for a NXT Tag Team Championship match opportunity but they failed to win the match. On the February 11, 2025 episode of NXT, Briggs and Inamura defeated No Quarter Catch Crew (Myles Borne and Tavion Heights) and Hank and Tank (Hank Walker and Tank Ledger) in a triple threat tag team match for a NXT Tag Team Championship match at NXT Vengeance Day but failed to win the titles. On the May 6 episode of NXT, Inamura inadvertently eliminated Briggs in the 25-man battle royal to determine the #1 contender for the NXT Championship and was eliminated as well. After the match, Inamura announced that he would be returning to Japan, disbanding his tag team with Briggs and ending his excursion in WWE. At NXT Battleground on May 25, Briggs and Hank and Tank defeated The Culling (Brooks Jensen, Niko Vance, Shawn Spears) in a six-man tag team match. After the match, The Culling attacked Briggs and Hank and Tank. They were saved by a returning Inamura, who reunites with Briggs in the process.

On the June 17 episode of NXT, Inamura pinned TNA World Champion Trick Williams in a six-man tag team match. As a result, Inamura was given a TNA World Championship match but he passed the title match to Briggs as he set his sights on the NXT Championship. On the following week, Briggs failed to defeat Williams for the title. On the July 22 episode of NXT, Briggs and Inamura faced Femi for the NXT Championship in a triple threat match where Femi retained the title. After the match, Briggs attacked Inamura, turning heel and disbanding their tag team partnership for the second time in the process, with Brooks Jensen berating his former tag team partner in the process.

=== Pro Wrestling Noah (2024) ===
In July 2024, it was announced that Bruns, as Josh Briggs, would be one of two NXT representatives (the other being Tavion Heights) to enter Pro Wrestling Noah's N-1 Victory tournament. Briggs was placed in the A-block and finished the tournament with 10 points and was tied for the most points in his block, but failed to advance to the finals after losing the tiebreaker to Kaito Kiyomiya. During their short tenure in Pro Wrestling Noah, both Briggs and Heights received training from Keiji Muto and Naomichi Marufuji.

== Championships and accomplishments ==
- Alpha-1 Wrestling
  - A1 Zero Gravity Championship (1 time)
- Chaotic Wrestling
  - Chaotic Wrestling New England Championship (1 time)
  - Chaotic Wrestling New England Title Tournament (2017)
- Evolve
  - Evolve Championship (1 time, final)
- Monster Factory Pro Wrestling
  - MFPW Network Championship (1 time)
- Northeast Championship Wrestling
  - Ox Baker Memorial Cup (2017)
- Pro Wrestling Illustrated
  - Ranked No. 175 of the top 500 singles wrestlers in the PWI 500 in 2020
- UFO Wrestling
  - UFO Tag Team Championship (1 time) – with Beau Douglas
- WWE
  - NXT UK Tag Team Championship (1 time, final) – with Brooks Jensen
  - NXT Year-End Award (1 time)
    - Match of the Year (2024) – vs. Oba Femi and Dijak at NXT Stand & Deliver
