= List of NXT Tag Team Champions =

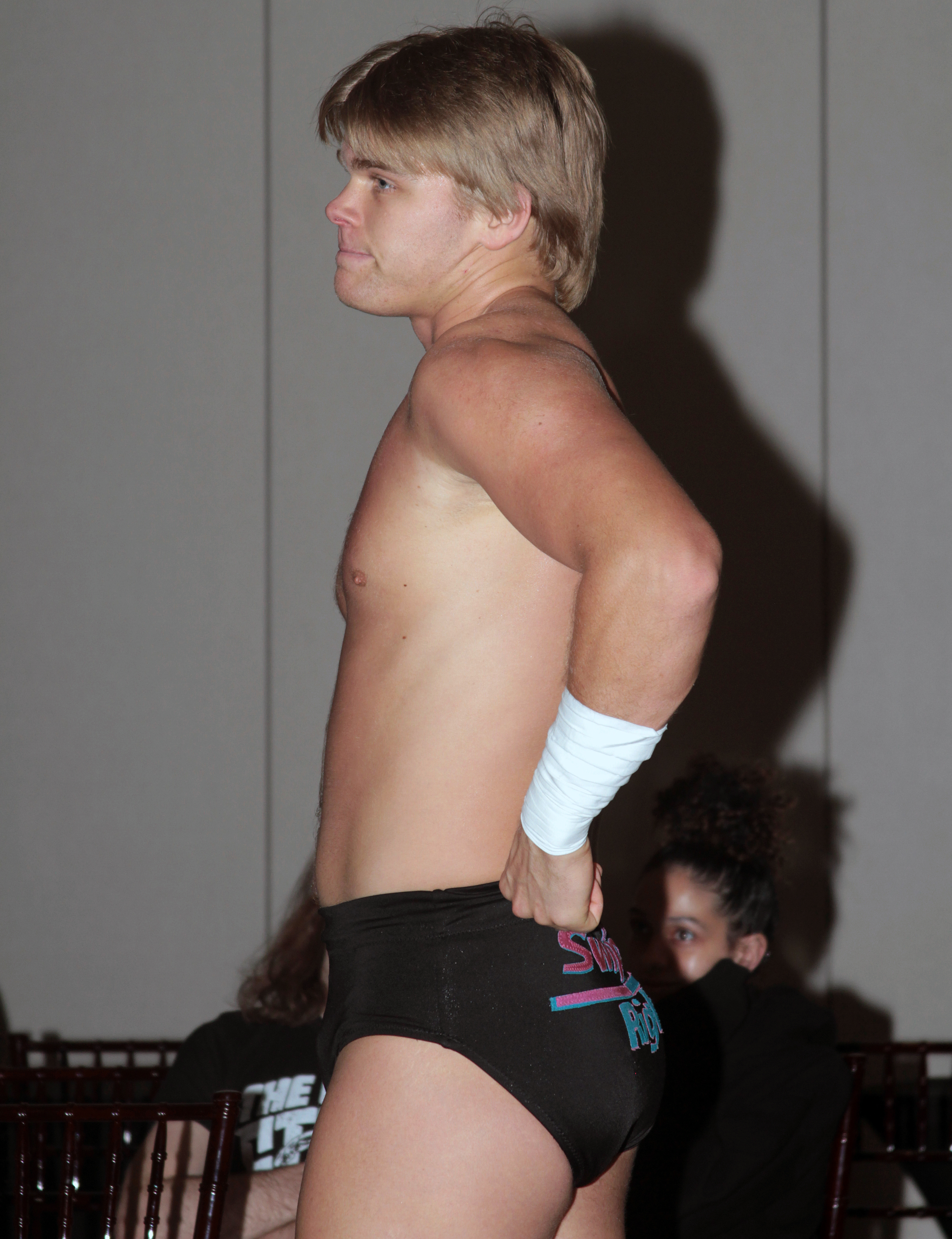
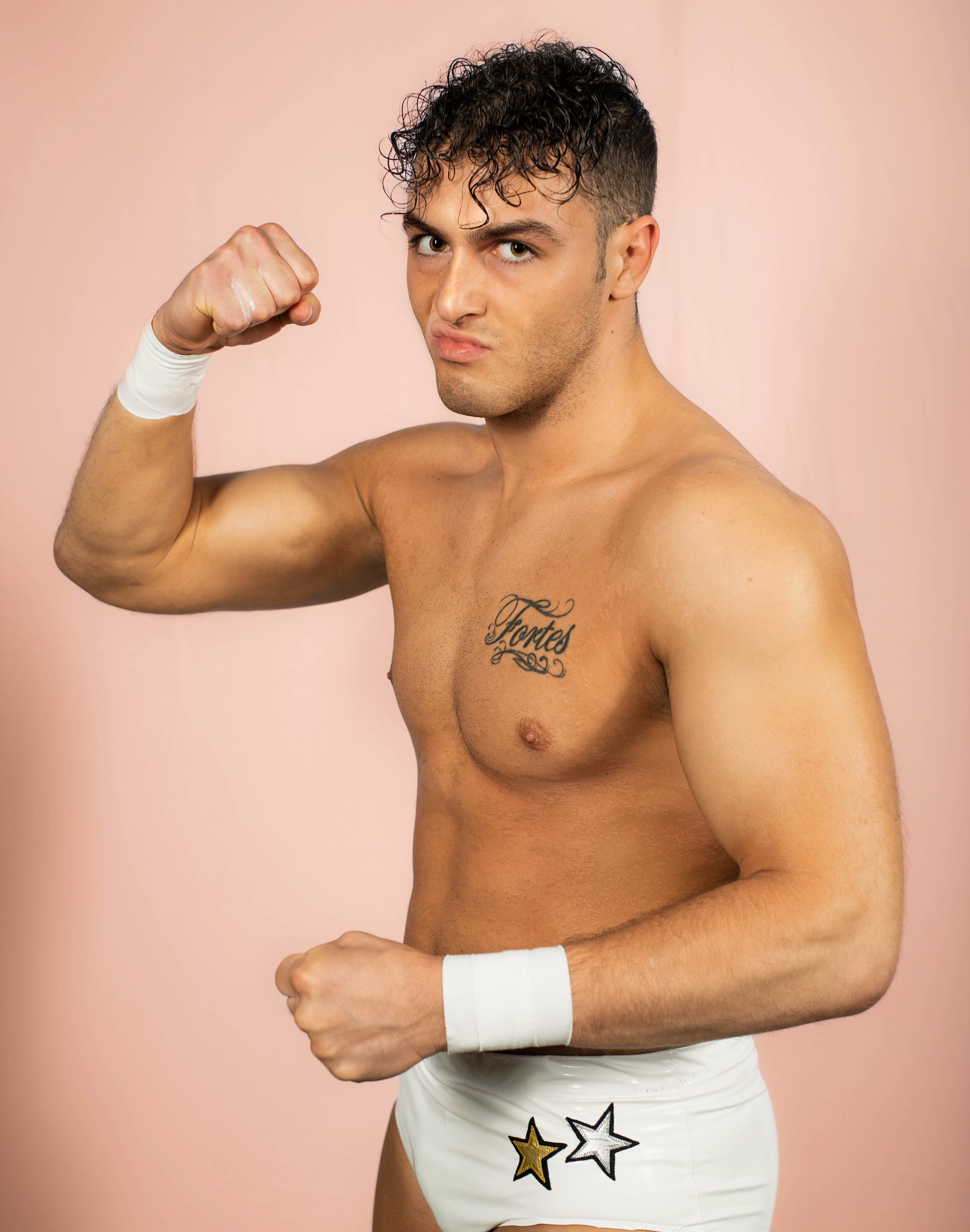
Current and two-time champions The Vanity Project (Brad Baylor and Ricky Smokes)

The NXT Tag Team Championship is a professional wrestling tag team championship created and promoted by the American professional wrestling promotion WWE for their NXT brand. The inaugural championship team was British Ambition (Adrian Neville and Oliver Grey), who won a tournament final during the January 31, 2013, taping of NXT (aired February 13).

As of October 28, 2026, there have been 45 reigns between 35 teams composed of 71 individual champions, and three vacancies. The Undisputed Era as a stable have the most reigns at three, while individually, stable member Kyle O'Reilly has the most reigns, also at three. The inaugural champions were British Ambition (Adrian Neville and Oliver Grey). The team with the longest reign is The Ascension (Conor O'Brian/Konnor and Rick Victor/Viktor), who held the title for 364 days, while the shortest reign belongs to Moustache Mountain (Tyler Bate and Trent Seven), who held the title for 2 days. However, due to tape delay, which are the air dates that WWE recognizes for the NXT Tag Team Championship's history, The Ascension's reign is regarded as lasting 343 days (still the longest) and that Moustache Mountain's reign was 22 days; as a result, MSK's (Nash Carter and Wes Lee) second reign of 6 days (5 days according to WWE) is recognized as the shortest. Tyler Bate is the youngest champion at 21, while Matt Hardy is the oldest at 51.

The Vanity Project (Brad Baylor and Ricky Smokes) are the current champions in their second reign, both as a team and individually. They won the title by defeating Myles Borne and Tavion Heights at Heatwave on August 30, 2026, in Edinburg, Texas.

== Title history ==
Key
| No. | Overall reign number |
| Reign | Reign number for the specific team—reign numbers for the individuals are in parentheses, if different |
| Days | Number of days held |
| Days recog. | Number of days held recognized by the promotion |
| + | Current reign is changing daily |

| No. | Champion | Championship change | | | Reign statistics | | | Notes | Ref. |
| No. | Champion | Date | Event | Location | Reign | Days | Days recog. | Notes | Ref. |
|---|---|---|---|---|---|---|---|---|---|
WWE: NXT
| 1 | British Ambition (Adrian Neville and Oliver Grey) | January 31, 2013 | NXT | Winter Park, FL | 1 | 91 | 83 | The championship was established on January 23, 2013. The British Ambition defeated The Wyatt Family (Luke Harper and Erick Rowan) in the tournament final to become the inaugural champions. Bo Dallas replaced Grey when he was injured, but was not recognized as champion. WWE recognizes their reign as beginning on February 13, 2013, and ending on May 8, 2013, both episodes of which aired on tape delay. | |
| 2 | The Wyatt Family (Luke Harper and Erick Rowan) | May 2, 2013 | NXT | Winter Park, FL | 1 | 49 | 69 | Bo Dallas filled in for an injured Oliver Grey. WWE recognizes their reign as beginning on May 8, 2013, and ending on July 17, 2013, both episodes of which aired on tape delay. | |
| 3 | Adrian Neville and Corey Graves | June 20, 2013 | NXT | Winter Park, FL | 1 (2, 1) | 84 | 76 | WWE recognizes their reign as beginning on July 17, 2013, and ending on October 2, 2013, both episodes of which aired on tape delay. | |
| 4 | The Ascension (Conor O'Brian/Konnor and Rick Victor/Viktor) | September 12, 2013 | NXT | Winter Park, FL | 1 | 364 | 343 | During their reign, their ring names were shortened to Konnor and Viktor, respectively. WWE recognizes their reign as beginning on October 2, 2013, when the episode aired on tape delay. | |
| 5 | Lucha Dragons (Kalisto and Sin Cara) | September 11, 2014 | TakeOver: Fatal 4-Way | Winter Park, FL | 1 | 126 | 139 | WWE recognizes their reign as ending on January 28, 2015, when the following episode aired on tape delay. | |
| 6 | Buddy Murphy/Murphy and Wesley Blake/Blake | January 15, 2015 | NXT | Winter Park, FL | 1 | 219 | 205 | During their reign, their ring names were shortened to Murphy and Blake, respectively. WWE recognizes their reign as beginning on January 28, 2015, when the episode aired on tape delay. | |
| 7 | The Vaudevillains (Aiden English and Simon Gotch) | August 22, 2015 | TakeOver: Brooklyn | Brooklyn, NY | 1 | 61 | 81 | WWE recognizes their reign as ending on November 11, 2015, when the following episode aired on tape delay. | |
| 8 | Dash and Dawson/The Revival (Dash Wilder and Scott Dawson) | October 22, 2015 | NXT | Winter Park, FL | 1 | 162 | 142 | During their reign, Dash and Dawson were renamed to The Revival. WWE recognizes their reign as beginning on November 11, 2015, when the episode aired on tape delay. | |
| 9 | American Alpha (Chad Gable and Jason Jordan) | April 1, 2016 | TakeOver: Dallas | Dallas, TX | 1 | 68 | 67 | | |
| 10 | The Revival (Dash Wilder and Scott Dawson) | June 8, 2016 | TakeOver: The End | Winter Park, FL | 2 | 164 | 164 | | |
| 11 | #DIY (Johnny Gargano and Tommaso Ciampa) | November 19, 2016 | TakeOver: Toronto | Toronto, ON, Canada | 1 | 70 | 69 | This was a two out of three falls match. | |
| 12 | Authors of Pain (Akam and Rezar) | January 28, 2017 | TakeOver: San Antonio | San Antonio, TX | 1 | 203 | 202 | | |
| 13 | Sanity (Eric Young and Alexander Wolfe) | August 19, 2017 | TakeOver: Brooklyn III | Brooklyn, NY | 1 | 102 | 123 | The match started with Killian Dain as Wolfe's partner; however, Young was tagged in instead, effectively replacing Dain. Dain also defended the title, but was not recognized as champion. WWE recognizes their reign as ending on December 20, 2017, when the following episode aired on tape delay. | |
| 14 | The Undisputed Era (Kyle O'Reilly and Bobby Fish/Adam Cole/Roderick Strong) | November 29, 2017 | NXT | Winter Park, FL | 1 | 180 (107/4/69) | 180 | Eric Young and Killian Dain represented Sanity. Fish and O'Reilly won the match and were originally champions as a duo. After Fish suffered a torn ACL and torn MCL in his left knee, he was replaced by Adam Cole under the Freebird Rule. On the April 11 tapings of NXT, Strong replaced Cole. WWE recognizes this as a single uninterrupted reign for all four men beginning on December 20, 2017, when the episode aired on tape delay. | |
| 15 | Moustache Mountain (Tyler Bate and Trent Seven) | June 19, 2018 | United Kingdom Championship Tournament | London, England | 1 | 2 | 22 | Roderick Strong and Kyle O'Reilly represented The Undisputed Era. Aired on tape delay on June 26, 2018. WWE recognizes their reign as ending on July 11, 2018, when the following episode aired on tape delay. | |
| 16 | The Undisputed Era (Kyle O'Reilly and Roderick Strong) | June 21, 2018 | NXT | Winter Park, FL | 2 | 219 | 198 | Won by submission when Tyler Bate threw in the towel. WWE recognizes their reign as beginning on July 11, 2018, when the episode aired on tape delay. | |
| 17 | War Raiders/The Viking Experience/The Viking Raiders (Hanson/Ivar and Rowe/Erik) | January 26, 2019 | TakeOver: Phoenix | Phoenix, AZ | 1 | 95 | 109 | During their reign, their team was renamed to The Viking Experience (and individual ring names to Ivar and Erik, respectively) when they were drafted to the Raw brand during the 2019 WWE Superstar Shake-up. The following week, their team name was again changed to The Viking Raiders. The title did not move to Raw, but the team remained champions until they voluntarily relinquished the title on the May 1, 2019 taping of NXT (aired on tape delay on May 15, the date WWE recognizes as the end date of their reign). | |
| — | Vacated | May 1, 2019 | NXT | Winter Park, FL | — | — | — | The Viking Raiders (Ivar and Erik) voluntarily relinquished the title as they were no longer part of NXT. Aired on tape delay on May 15, 2019. | |
| 18 | The Street Profits (Montez Ford and Angelo Dawkins) | June 1, 2019 | TakeOver: XXV | Bridgeport, CT | 1 | 75 | 88 | This was a fatal four-way tag team ladder match for the vacant championship also involving Oney Lorcan and Danny Burch, The Undisputed Era (Bobby Fish and Kyle O'Reilly), and The Forgotten Sons (Wesley Blake and Steve Cutler). | |
| 19 | The Undisputed Era (Bobby Fish and Kyle O'Reilly) | August 15, 2019 | NXT | Winter Park, FL | 2 (2, 3) | 185 | 172 | WWE recognizes their reign as beginning on August 28, 2019, when the episode aired on tape delay. | |
| 20 | The BroserWeights (Matt Riddle and Pete Dunne) | February 16, 2020 | TakeOver: Portland | Portland, OR | 1 | 87 | 86 | | |
| 21 | Imperium (Fabian Aichner and Marcel Barthel) | May 13, 2020 | NXT | Winter Park, FL | 1 | 105 | 105 | Defeated Riddle and Timothy Thatcher, who substituted for Dunne, as Dunne (who lives in the UK) was not able to travel to the U.S. due to COVID-19 pandemic travel restrictions. | |
| 22 | Breezango (Tyler Breeze and Fandango) | August 26, 2020 | NXT | Winter Park, FL | 1 | 56 | 56 | | |
| 23 | Oney Lorcan and Danny Burch | October 21, 2020 | NXT | Orlando, FL | 1 | 153 | 152 | | |
| — | Vacated | March 23, 2021 | — | — | — | — | — | NXT General Manager William Regal vacated the championship after Danny Burch suffered a shoulder injury the week prior. | |
| 24 | MSK (Wes Lee and Nash Carter) | April 7, 2021 | TakeOver: Stand & Deliver; Night 1 | Orlando, FL | 1 | 202 | 202 | This was a triple threat tag team match also involving Grizzled Young Veterans (Zack Gibson and James Drake) and Legado Del Fantasma (Raul Mendoza and Joaquin Wilde) for the vacant titles. | |
| 25 | Imperium (Fabian Aichner and Marcel Barthel) | October 26, 2021 | NXT 2.0: Halloween Havoc | Orlando, FL | 2 | 158 | 157 | This was a Lumber Jack-O'-Lantern match. | |
| 26 | MSK (Wes Lee and Nash Carter) | April 2, 2022 | Stand & Deliver | Dallas, TX | 2 | 6 | 5 | This was a triple threat tag team match also involving Creed Brothers (Brutus Creed and Julius Creed). | |
| — | Vacated | April 8, 2022 | — | — | — | — | — | The title was vacated due to Nash Carter's release. | |
| 27 | Pretty Deadly (Elton Prince and Kit Wilson) | April 12, 2022 | NXT 2.0 | Orlando, FL | 1 | 53 | 52 | This was a Gauntlet match also involving Legado Del Fantasma (Joaquin Wilde and Cruz Del Toro), Josh Briggs and Brooks Jensen, and Grayson Waller and Sanga, and Creed Brothers (Brutus Creed and Julius Creed), who they last eliminated to win the vacant titles. | |
| 28 | Creed Brothers (Brutus Creed and Julius Creed) | June 4, 2022 | In Your House | Orlando, FL | 1 | 92 | 91 | If the Creed Brothers had lost, they would have to leave Diamond Mine. | |
| 29 | Pretty Deadly (Elton Prince and Kit Wilson) | September 4, 2022 | Worlds Collide | Orlando, FL | 2 | 97 | 97 | This was a fatal four-way tag team elimination match also involving NXT UK Tag Team Champions Brooks Jensen and Josh Briggs, and Gallus (Mark Coffey and Wolfgang) to unify the NXT UK Tag Team Championship into the NXT Tag Team Championship. Pretty Deadly last eliminated The Creed Brothers to win both championships. The NXT UK Tag Team Championship was retired with Pretty Deadly going forward as the unified NXT Tag Team Champions. | |
| 30 | The New Day (Kofi Kingston and Xavier Woods) | December 10, 2022 | Deadline | Orlando, FL | 1 | 56 | 56 | | |
| 31 | Gallus (Mark Coffey and Wolfgang) | February 4, 2023 | Vengeance Day | Charlotte, NC | 1 | 176 | 175 | This was a fatal four-way tag team match also involving Pretty Deadly (Elton Prince and Kit Wilson) and Chase University (Andre Chase and Duke Hudson). | |
| 32 | Tony D'Angelo and Channing "Stacks" Lorenzo | July 30, 2023 | The Great American Bash | Cedar Park, TX | 1 | 86 | 86 | | |
| 33 | Chase University (Andre Chase and Duke Hudson) | October 24, 2023 | NXT: Halloween Havoc; Week 1 | Orlando, FL | 1 | 21 | 21 | | |
| 34 | Tony D'Angelo and Channing "Stacks" Lorenzo | November 14, 2023 | NXT | Orlando, FL | 2 | 91 | 91 | | |
| 35 | Bron Breakker and Baron Corbin | February 13, 2024 | NXT | Orlando, FL | 1 | 56 | 55 | | |
| 36 | Nathan Frazer and Axiom | April 9, 2024 | NXT | Orlando, FL | 1 | 126 | 126 | | |
| 37 | Chase University (Andre Chase and Ridge Holland) | August 13, 2024 | NXT | Orlando, FL | 1 (2, 1) | 19 | 18 | | |
| 38 | Nathan Frazer and Axiom | September 1, 2024 | No Mercy | Denver, CO | 2 | 230 | 229 | | |
| 39 | Hank and Tank (Hank Walker and Tank Ledger) | April 19, 2025 | Stand & Deliver | Paradise, NV | 1 | 127 | 127 | | |
| 40 | DarkState (Dion Lennox and Osiris Griffin) | August 24, 2025 | Heatwave | Lowell, MA | 1 | 44 | 44 | | |
| 41 | The Hardy Boyz (Matt Hardy and Jeff Hardy) | October 7, 2025 | NXT vs. TNA Showdown | Orlando, FL | 1 | 18 | 18 | This was a Winners Take All match in which The Hardy Boyz defended the TNA World Tag Team Championship. | |
| 42 | DarkState (Osiris Griffin and Dion Lennox/Saquon Shugars) | October 25, 2025 | Halloween Havoc | Prescott Valley, AZ | 2/1 (2, 2/1) | 122 (38/84) | 121 | This was a Broken Rules match. Originally, Griffin and Lennox won the title, but on the December 2, 2025, episode of NXT, Lennox relinquished his half of the title to stablemate Shugars to focus on pursuing singles championships. | |
| 43 | The Vanity Project (Brad Baylor and Ricky Smokes) | February 24, 2026 | NXT | Orlando, FL | 1 | 161 | 160 | | |
| 44 | Myles Borne and Tavion Heights | August 4, 2026 | NXT | Orlando, FL | 1 | 26 | 25 | | |
| 45 | The Vanity Project (Brad Baylor and Ricky Smokes) | August 30, 2026 | Heatwave | Edinburg, TX | 2 | 59+ | 59+ | | |

== Combined reigns ==
As of October 28, 2026.

| † | Indicates the current champion |

=== By team ===
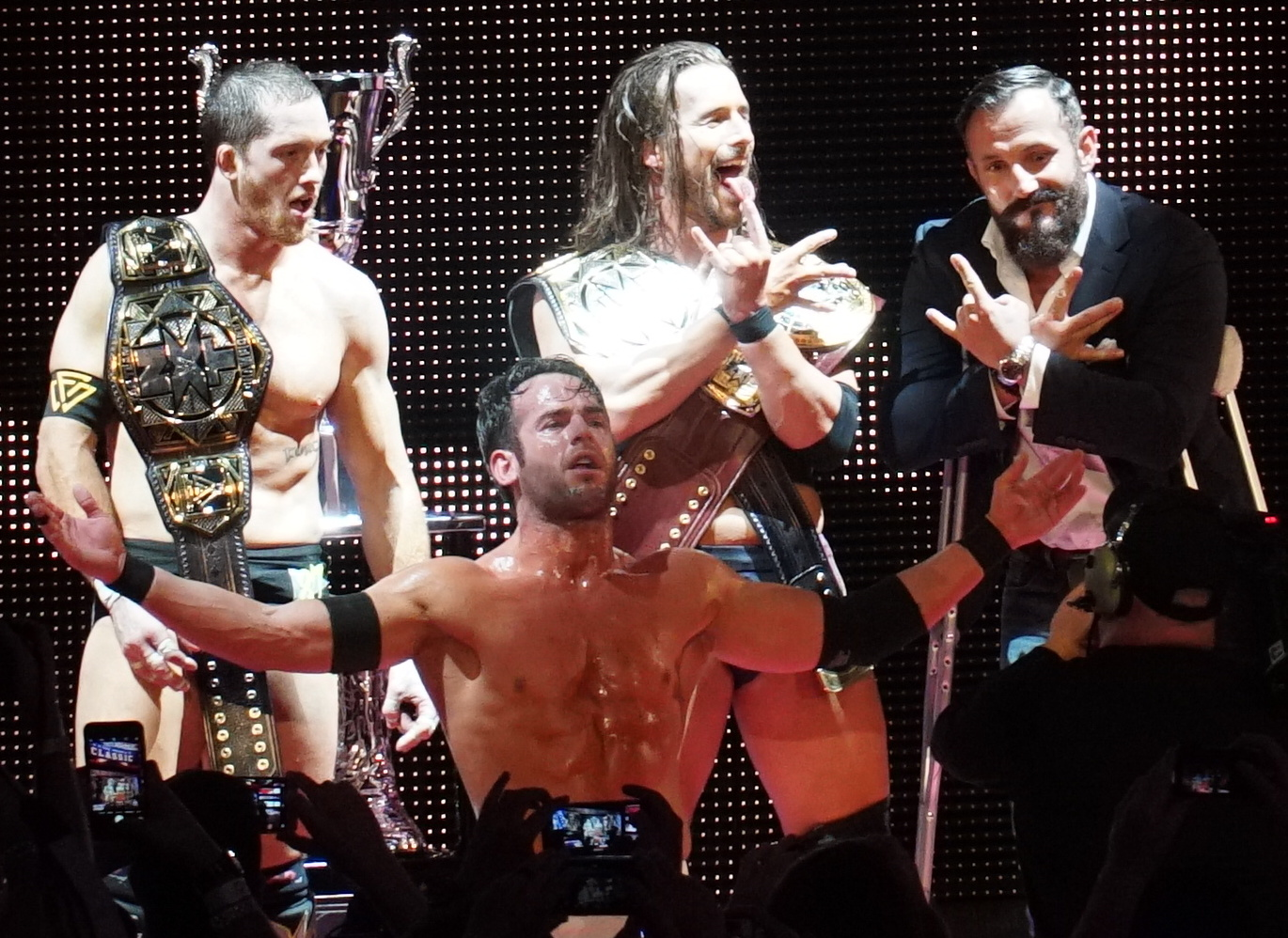
Under various formations, The Undisputed Era (Kyle O'Reilly, Roderick Strong, Adam Cole, and Bobby Fish) holds the record for most reigns as a team at 3 and most combined days as champions at 584 days (550 as recognized by WWE due to tape delay).

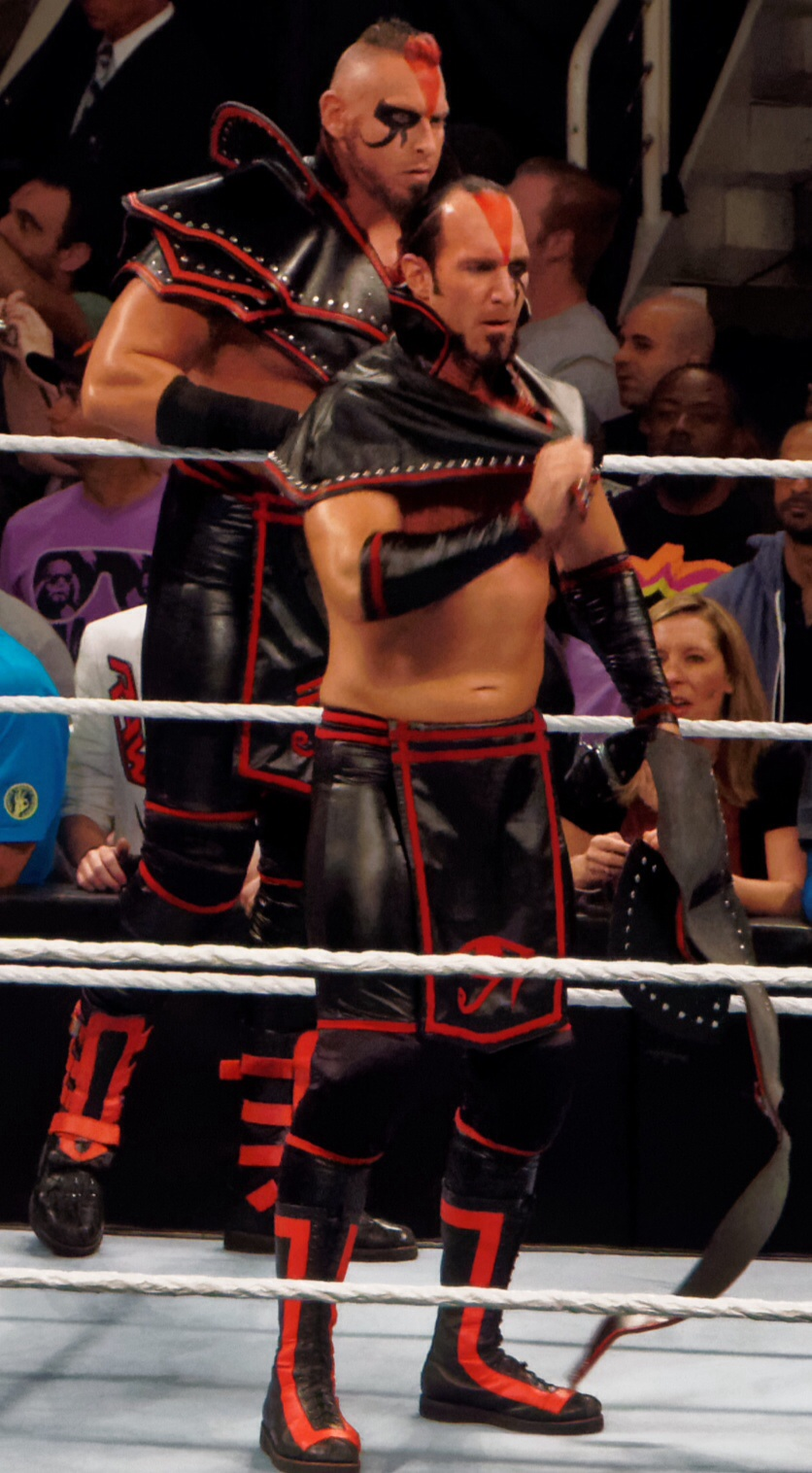
The Ascension (Konnor and Viktor) have the longest single reign, lasting for 364 days (343 days as recognized by WWE due to tape delay)

| Rank | Team | No. of reigns | Combined days | Combined days rec. by WWE |
|---|---|---|---|---|
| 1 | The Undisputed Era^{1} (1st reign: Kyle O'Reilly and Bobby Fish/Adam Cole/Roderick Strong) (2nd reign: O'Reilly and Strong) (3rd reign: Fish and O'Reilly) | 3 | 584 | 550 |
| 2 | The Ascension (Conor O'Brian/Konnor and Rick Victor/Viktor) | 1 | 364 | 343 |
| 3 | Nathan Frazer and Axiom | 2 | 356 | |
| 4 | Dash and Dawson/The Revival (Dash Wilder and Scott Dawson) | 2 | 326 | 306 |
| 5 | Imperium (Fabian Aichner and Marcel Barthel) | 2 | 263 | 262 |
| 6 | The Vanity Project † (Brad Baylor and Ricky Smokes) | 2 | 220+ | |
| 7 | Wesley Blake/Blake and Buddy Murphy/Murphy | 1 | 219 | 205 |
| 8 | MSK (Nash Carter and Wes Lee) | 2 | 208 | 207 |
| 9 | The Authors of Pain (Akam and Rezar) | 1 | 203 | 202 |
| 10 | Tony D'Angelo and Channing "Stacks" Lorenzo | 2 | 177 | |
| 11 | Gallus (Mark Coffey and Wolfgang) | 1 | 176 | 175 |
| 12 | DarkState (Osiris Griffin and Dion Lennox/Saquon Shugars) | 2 | 166 | |
| 13 | Oney Lorcan and Danny Burch | 1 | 153 | 152 |
| 14 | Pretty Deadly (Elton Prince and Kit Wilson) | 2 | 150 | 149 |
| 15 | Hank and Tank (Hank Walker and Tank Ledger) | 1 | 127 | |
| 16 | The Lucha Dragons (Kalisto and Sin Cara) | 1 | 126 | 139 |
| 17 | Sanity (Eric Young and Alexander Wolfe) | 1 | 102 | 123 |
| 18 | War Raiders/The Viking Experience/The Viking Raiders (Hanson/Ivar and Rowe/Erik) | 1 | 95 | 109 |
| 19 | Creed Brothers (Brutus Creed and Julius Creed) | 1 | 92 | 91 |
| 20 | British Ambition (Adrian Neville and Oliver Grey) | 1 | 91 | 83 |
| 21 | The BroserWeights (Matt Riddle and Pete Dunne) | 1 | 87 | 86 |
| 22 | Adrian Neville and Corey Graves | 1 | 84 | 76 |
| 23 | The Street Profits (Montez Ford and Angelo Dawkins) | 1 | 75 | 88 |
| 24 | #DIY (Johnny Gargano and Tommaso Ciampa) | 1 | 70 | 69 |
| 25 | American Alpha (Chad Gable and Jason Jordan) | 1 | 68 | 67 |
| 26 | The Vaudevillains (Aiden English and Simon Gotch) | 1 | 61 | 81 |
| 27 | Breezango (Tyler Breeze and Fandango) | 1 | 56 | |
| 27 | The New Day (Kofi Kingston and Xavier Woods) | 1 | 56 | |
| 27 | Bron Breakker and Baron Corbin | 1 | 56 | 55 |
| 30 | The Wyatt Family (Luke Harper and Erick Rowan) | 1 | 49 | 69 |
| 31 | Myles Borne and Tavion Heights | 1 | 26 | |
| 32 | Chase University (Andre Chase and Duke Hudson) | 1 | 21 | |
| 33 | Chase University (Andre Chase and Ridge Holland) | 1 | 19 | 18 |
| 34 | The Hardy Boyz (Matt Hardy and Jeff Hardy) | 1 | 18 | |
| 35 | Moustache Mountain (Tyler Bate and Trent Seven) | 1 | 2 | 22 |

^{1} Bobby Fish and Kyle O'Reilly of The Undisputed Era won the titles on November 29, 2017. Adam Cole became co-champion under the Freebird Rule on April 7, 2018. However, four days later on NXT, Roderick Strong took his place; WWE recognizes this as a single 180-day-long uninterrupted reign for all four men. The Freebird Rule was not applied to the group's subsequent reigns.

=== By wrestler ===
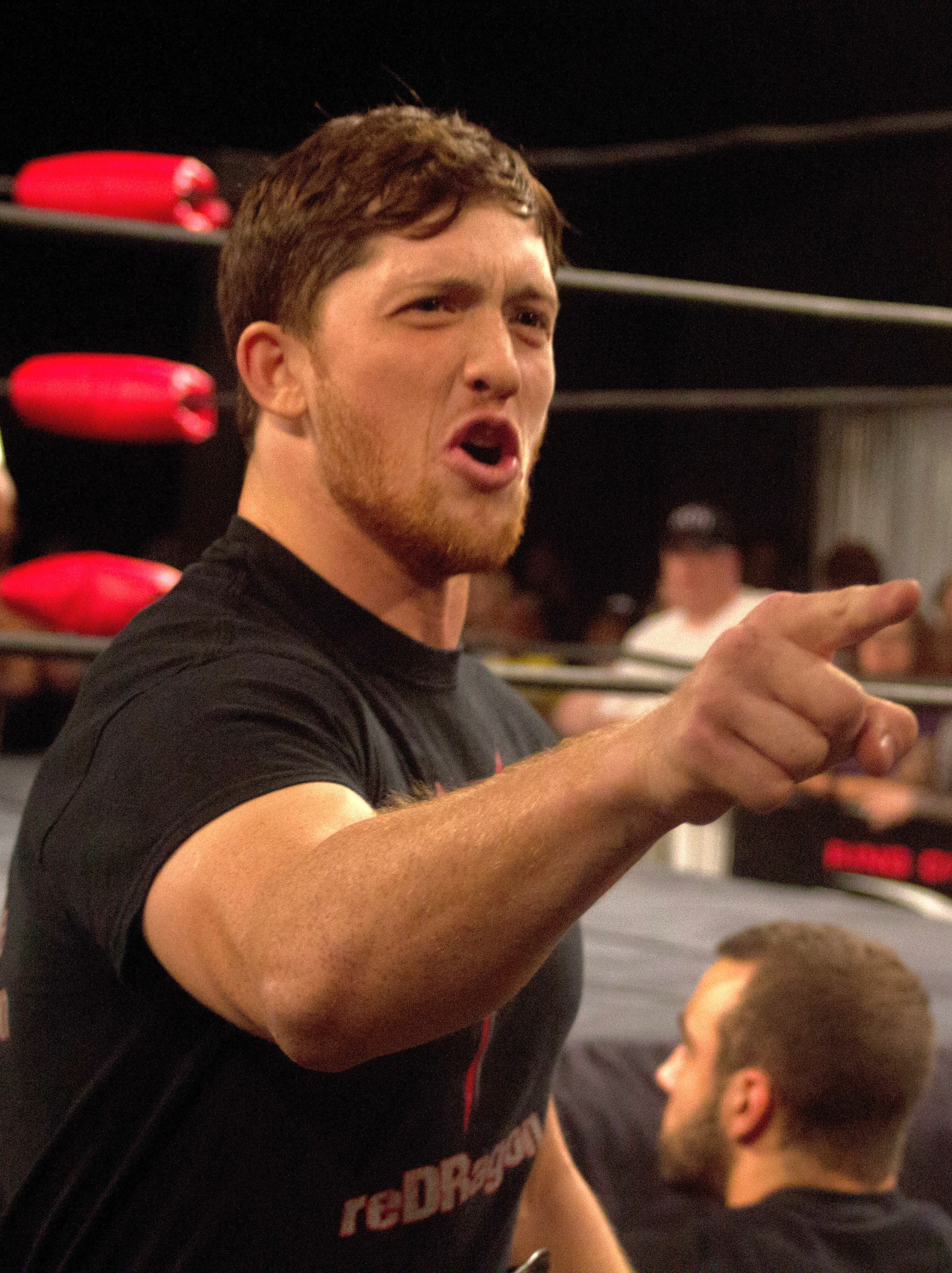
Kyle O'Reilly holds the record for the most individual reigns at three and the longest combined reigns at 584 days (550 days as recognized by WWE due to tape delay).

| Rank | Wrestler | No. of reigns | Combined days | Combined days rec. by WWE |
|---|---|---|---|---|
| 1 | Kyle O'Reilly^{1} | 3 | 584 | 550 |
| 2 | Conor O'Brian/Konnor | 1 | 364 | 343 |
| 2 | Rick Victor/Viktor | 1 | 364 | 343 |
| 4 | Axiom | 2 | 356 | 355 |
| 4 | Nathan Frazer | 2 | 356 | 355 |
| 6 | Dash Wilder | 2 | 326 | 306 |
| 6 | Scott Dawson | 2 | 326 | 306 |
| 8 | Bobby Fish^{1} | 2 | 292 | 352 |
| 9 | Roderick Strong^{1} | 2 | 288 | 378 |
| 10 | Fabian Aichner | 2 | 263 | 262 |
| 10 | Marcel Barthel | 2 | 263 | 262 |
| 12 | Brad Baylor † | 2 | 220+ | |
| 12 | Ricky Smokes † | 2 | 220+ | |
| 14 | Buddy Murphy/Murphy | 1 | 219 | 205 |
| 14 | Wesley Blake/Blake | 1 | 219 | 205 |
| 16 | Nash Carter | 2 | 208 | 207 |
| 16 | Wes Lee | 2 | 208 | 207 |
| 18 | Akam | 1 | 203 | 202 |
| 18 | Rezar | 1 | 203 | 202 |
| 20 | Tony D'Angelo | 2 | 177 | |
| 20 | Channing "Stacks" Lorenzo | 2 | 177 | |
| 22 | Mark Coffey | 1 | 176 | 175 |
| 22 | Wolfgang | 1 | 176 | 175 |
| 24 | Adrian Neville | 2 | 175 | 159 |
| 25 | Osiris Griffin | 2 | 166 | |
| 26 | Oney Lorcan | 1 | 153 | 152 |
| 26 | Danny Burch | 1 | 153 | 152 |
| 28 | Elton Prince | 2 | 150 | 149 |
| 28 | Kit Wilson | 2 | 150 | 149 |
| 30 | Hank Walker | 1 | 127 | |
| 30 | Tank Ledger | 1 | 127 | |
| 32 | Kalisto | 1 | 126 | 139 |
| 32 | Sin Cara | 1 | 126 | 139 |
| 34 | Eric Young | 1 | 102 | 123 |
| 34 | Alexander Wolfe | 1 | 102 | 123 |
| 36 | Hanson/Ivar | 1 | 95 | 109 |
| 36 | Erik/Rowe | 1 | 95 | 109 |
| 38 | Brutus Creed | 1 | 92 | 91 |
| 38 | Julius Creed | 1 | 92 | 91 |
| 40 | Oliver Grey | 1 | 91 | 83 |
| 41 | Matt Riddle | 1 | 87 | 86 |
| 41 | Pete Dunne | 1 | 87 | 86 |
| 43 | Saquon Shugars | 1 | 84 | 122 |
| 44 | Corey Graves | 1 | 84 | 76 |
| 45 | Dion Lennox | 2 | 82 | |
| 46 | Montez Ford | 1 | 75 | 88 |
| 46 | Angelo Dawkins | 1 | 75 | 88 |
| 48 | Johnny Gargano | 1 | 70 | 69 |
| 48 | Tommaso Ciampa | 1 | 70 | 69 |
| 50 | Chad Gable | 1 | 68 | 67 |
| 50 | Jason Jordan | 1 | 68 | 67 |
| 52 | Aiden English | 1 | 61 | 81 |
| 52 | Simon Gotch | 1 | 61 | 81 |
| 54 | Tyler Breeze | 1 | 56 | |
| 54 | Fandango | 1 | 56 | |
| 54 | Kofi Kingston | 1 | 56 | |
| 54 | Xavier Woods | 1 | 56 | |
| 54 | Baron Corbin | 1 | 56 | 55 |
| 54 | Bron Breakker | 1 | 56 | 55 |
| 60 | Luke Harper | 1 | 49 | 69 |
| 60 | Erick Rowan | 1 | 49 | 69 |
| 62 | Andre Chase | 2 | 40 | 39 |
| 63 | Myles Borne | 1 | 26 | |
| 63 | Tavion Heights | 1 | 26 | |
| 65 | Duke Hudson | 1 | 21 | |
| 66 | Ridge Holland | 1 | 19 | 18 |
| 67 | Matt Hardy | 1 | 18 | 18 |
| 67 | Jeff Hardy | 1 | 18 | 18 |
| 69 | Adam Cole^{1} | 1 | 4 | 180 |
| 70 | Tyler Bate | 1 | 2 | 22 |
| 70 | Trent Seven | 1 | 2 | 22 |

^{1} Bobby Fish and Kyle O'Reilly of The Undisputed Era won the titles on November 29, 2017. Adam Cole became co-champion under the Freebird Rule on April 7, 2018 in place of Fish. However, four days later on NXT, Roderick Strong took his place; WWE recognizes this as a single 180-day long uninterrupted reign for all four men.

== See also ==
- Tag team championships in WWE
