= Ivy Nile =

American professional wrestler (born 1992)

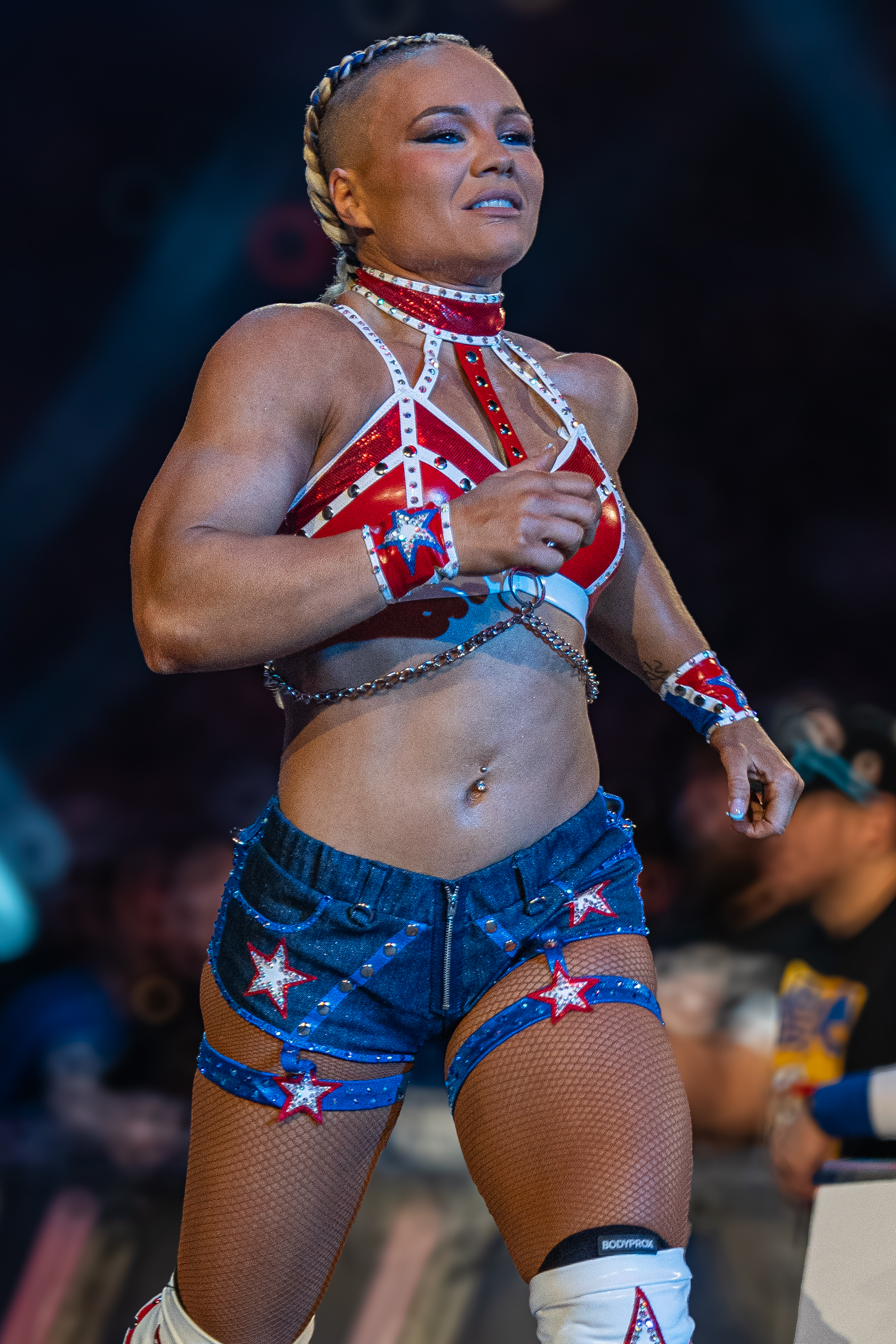
- Nile in 2025

Personal information
- Born: February 26, 1992 (age 34) Knoxville, Tennessee, U.S.
- Spouse: Ari Levy (m. 2022)

Professional wrestling career
- Ring name: Ivy Nile
- Billed height: 5 ft 3 in (160 cm)
- Billed weight: 126 lb (57 kg)
- Trained by: Glenn Jacobs; Tom Prichard; WWE Performance Center
- Debut: February 21, 2020

Emily Andzulis (born February 26, 1992), better known by her ring name Ivy Nile, is an American professional wrestler. She is signed to WWE, where she performs on the Raw brand.

== Early life ==
Andzulis earned national recognition from her time on NBC's sports game show Titan Games hosted by Dwayne Johnson.

She also competed in MMA in the Women's Flyweight division. She is of Lithuanian descent.

== Professional wrestling career ==
=== WWE (2020–present) ===
==== NXT (2020–2023) ====
Andzulis was offered a WWE tryout in April 2019. She went on to train at the Jacobs-Prichard Wrestling Academy under Glenn "Kane" Jacobs and Tom Prichard in Knoxville, Tennessee. Her graduating class was held in Grimsley, Tennessee at 127 Pro Wrestling. On January 14, 2020, it was reported that WWE had signed Andzulis to a developmental contract.

Andzulis made her in-ring debut on an NXT house show, teaming with Catalina Garcia & Rita Reis in a losing effort to Deonna Purrazzo, Indi Hartwell & MJ Jenkins. Andzulis made her televised debut on the September 23 episode of NXT during which she competed in a Number One Contender Battle Royal which was won by Candice LeRae. After a prolonged absence from the ring, Andzulis returned the following year under the ring name "Ivy Nile" as a member of Diamond Mine faction alongside Roderick Strong, the Creed Brothers, Hachiman and Malcolm Bivens on the October 12, 2021 episode of NXT, during which she defeated Valentina Feroz.

In February 2022, Nile began teaming with Tatum Paxley, with their first match as a team defeating Fallon Henley and Kayla Inlay on NXT Level Up. On the February 22 episode of NXT, Paxley and Nile participated in the first round of the women's Dusty Rhodes Tag Team Classic, facing Kacy Catanzaro and Kayden Carter, in which they were defeated. Nile and Paxley participated in a fatal four-way tag team match against Katana Chance and Carter, Valentina Feroz and Yulisa Leon, and Toxic Attraction (Gigi Dolin and Jacy Jayne) on the August 2 episode of NXT for the vacant NXT Women's Tag Team Championship, which they failed to win. After feeling morally abandoned by Nile, on the March 14, 2023, episode of NXT, Paxley turned heel and abandoned her during a three-way tag team match, attacking her and causing her to suffer the pinfall at the hands of Alba Fyre and Isla Dawn. On April 4 episode of NXT, Nile defeated Paxley to end the feud.

==== Raw (2023–present) ====
On the November 6 show of Raw, the Creed Brothers and Nile officially signed for the Raw brand. Nile participated in a battle royal for a Women's World Championship match at Survivor Series. Nile eliminated Kayden Carter, Katana Chance and Natalya and survived as the final 4 participants but was eliminated by an already eliminated Nia Jax. On the November 20 show of Raw, Nile teamed up with Alpha Academy's Maxxine Dupri in a fatal four-way tag team match for a WWE Women's Tag Team Championship match in a losing effort. On the December 11 show of Raw, Nile accompanied Dupri in a non-title match against Women's World Champion Rhea Ripley. Ripley won by submission and did not release the hold until Nile entered the ring and both women stared each other down. Ripley vowed to make an example out of Nile, agreeing to put the Women's World Championship on the line against Nile at Raw: Day 1 but Nile lost to Ripley for the title in her main roster debut match. Nile debuted in the Royal Rumble match in the titular event, entering as the number 8 and was eliminated by Nia Jax.

At Night 2 of the 2024 WWE Draft, Nile and The Creed Brothers were drafted to the Raw brand in the bonus draft. Back in April 2024 at NXT Stand & Deliver, NXT general manager Ava revealed the newly created NXT Women's North American Championship, and Nile went through as one of the top 12 participants from the preliminary combine to compete for a spot in the six-woman ladder match to crown the inaugural champion at NXT Battleground. On the May 14 episode of NXT, The Meta-Four's Lash Legend defeated Nile to qualify for a spot at NXT Battleground. On the August 12 episode of Raw, Nile attacked Dupri to officially join Chad Gable's American Made stable alongside the Creed Brothers, turning heel for the first time since 2022. In May 2025, Nile participated and won the Women's Speed Championship #1 Contender's Tournament, but she failed to win the championship from Sol Ruca.

== Other media ==
Ivy Nile made her video game debut in WWE 2K23 as a downloadable character as part of the Race To NXT Pack and appeared on the main game of WWE 2K24, WWE 2K25 and WWE 2K26.

== Personal life ==
In 2022, Andzulis married fitness instructor Ari Levy.

== Championships and accomplishments ==
- Pro Wrestling Illustrated
  - Ranked No. 158 of the top 250 female wrestlers in the PWI Women's 250 in 2025
- WWE
  - WWE Women's Speed Championship #1 Contender Tournament (May 9–May 28, 2025)
