= Cash Wheeler =

American professional wrestler (born 1987)

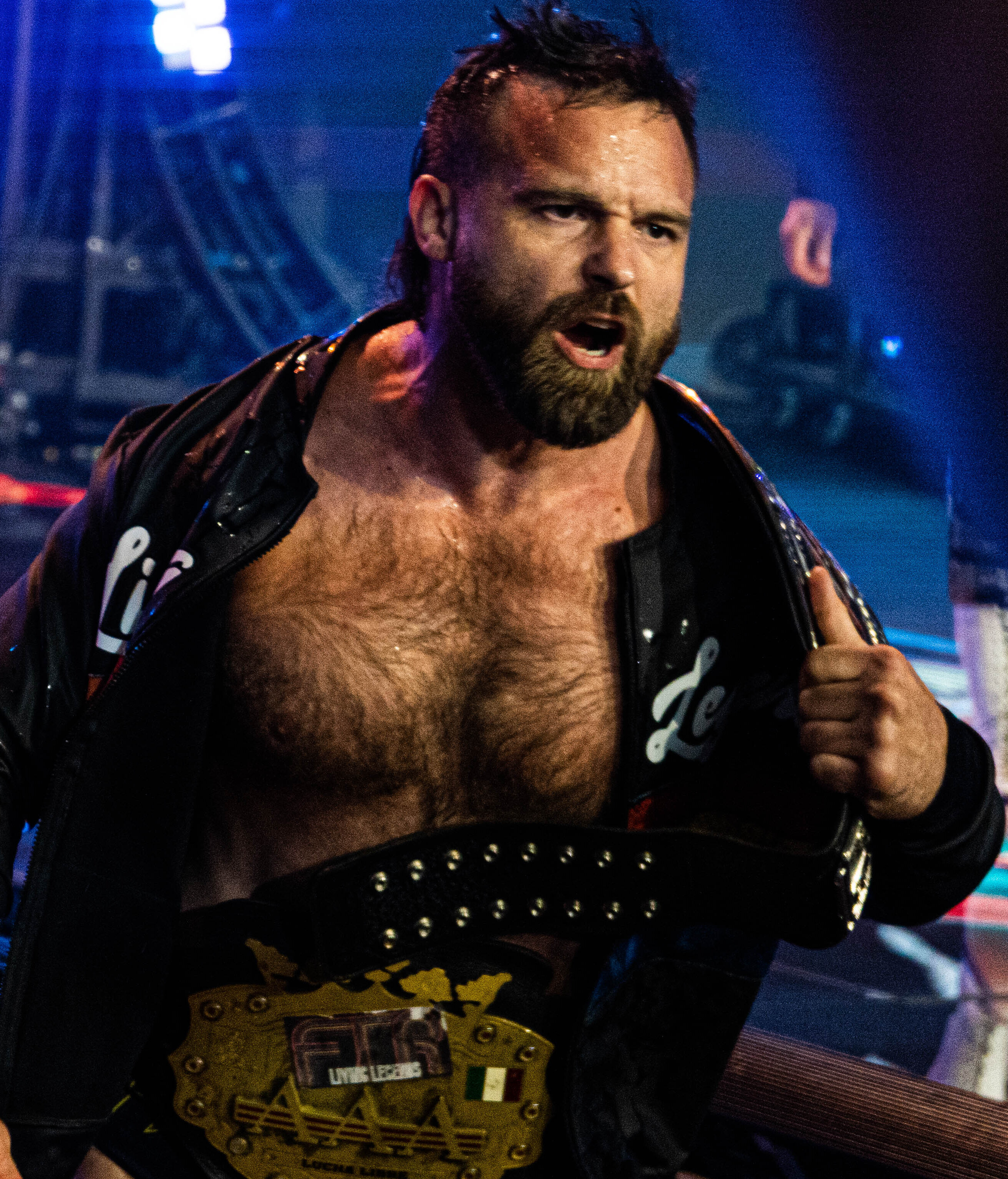
- Wheeler in 2022

Personal information
- Born: Daniel Marshall Wheeler; May 17, 1987 (age 39) Asheville, North Carolina, U.S.

Professional wrestling career
- Ring name(s): Brett Storm; Cash Wheeler; Daniel Wheeler; Dash Wilder; Steven Walters
- Billed height: 5 ft 10 in (178 cm)
- Billed weight: 223 lb (101 kg)
- Billed from: Asheville, North Carolina; Kill Devil Hills, North Carolina; Toronto, Ontario, Canada
- Trained by: Matt Bloom; WWE Performance Center
- Debut: 2005

Daniel Marshall Wheeler (born May 17, 1987) is an American professional wrestler. He is signed to All Elite Wrestling (AEW), where he performs under the ring name Cash Wheeler and is one-half of FTR with Dax Harwood. As FTR, Wheeler and Harwood are former three time AEW World Tag Team Champions.

He is best known for his time in WWE, where he performed under the ring name Dash Wilder. In WWE, he and Harwood (then known as Scott Dawson) under the team name of The Revival held the SmackDown Tag Team Championship, as well as both the Raw Tag Team Championship and NXT Tag Team Championship twice, making them the first WWE Tag Team Triple Crown winners. They also jointly held the WWE 24/7 Championship. Wheeler (with Harwood) has also appeared in Ring of Honor (ROH), New Japan Pro-Wrestling (NJPW) and Revolution Pro Wrestling (RevPro), and Lucha Libre AAA Worldwide (AAA), where they held those promotions' respective tag team championships once each.

== Professional wrestling career ==
=== Early career (2005–2014) ===
Wheeler made his professional wrestling debut in 2005, wrestled extensively on the independent circuit under the ring name "Steven Walters". He most notably appeared for NWA Anarchy, where he won both the NWA Anarchy Television Championship and the NWA Anarchy Tag Team Championship. he also worked for numerous other promotions such as OMEGA Championship Wrestling, Resistance Pro Wrestling and Dragon Gate USA. He also wrestled internationally for promotions such as All Star Wrestling, Preston City Wrestling, and Pro Wrestling ZERO1.

=== WWE (2014–2020) ===
Wheeler signed with WWE in 2014 and reported to the WWE Performance Center, taking the ring name Dash Wilder. Dusty Rhodes gave Wheeler the ring name Dash Wilder. Wheeler wanted to call his character "Cash" instead of "Dash", but Rhodes preferred the latter because it reminded him of his son Cody's nickname, "Dashing". Wilder was chosen due to its similarity to Wheeler. He immediately formed a tag-team with Scott Dawson, with the two performing extensively at live events under the name The Mechanics. The duo made their debut on the July 17, 2014 episode of NXT, losing to Bull Dempsey and Mojo Rawley. The duo made only one further televised appearance in 2014, losing to Enzo Amore and Colin Cassady on the October 23 episode of NXT, but continued to wrestle extensively at house shows.

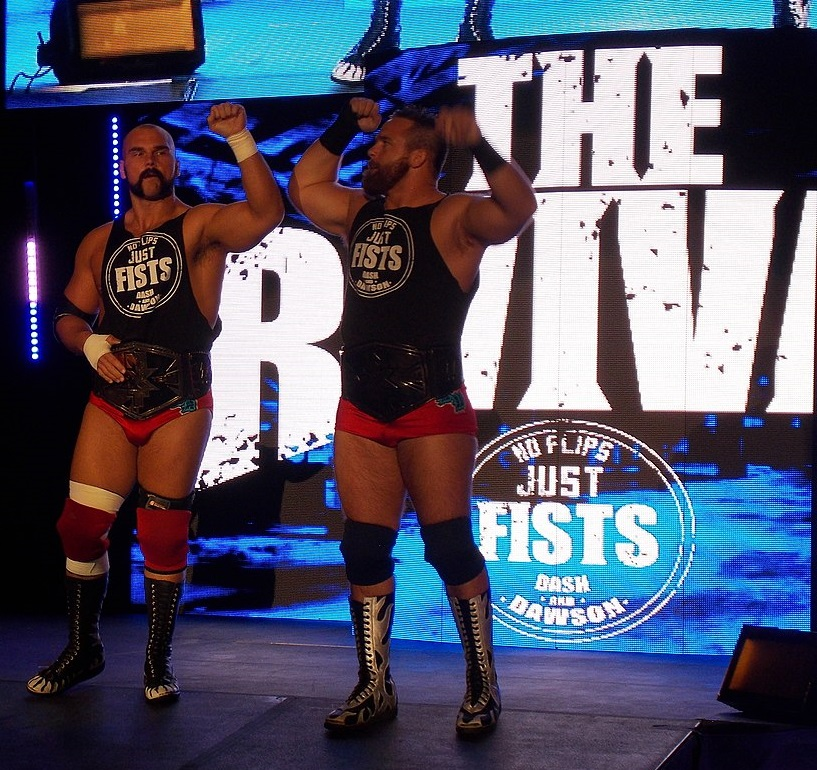
Wilder (right) with Scott Dawson as the NXT Tag Team Champions in September 2016

Dawson and Wilder's team resurfaced and picked up their first televised win on the July 29, 2015 episode of NXT, defeating Amore and Cassady. The duo were involved in an 8-man tag-team match that was taped prior to NXT TakeOver: Brooklyn. At NXT TakeOver: Respect, Dawson and Wilder were defeated in the semi-finals of the Dusty Rhodes Tag Team Classic by eventual winners Samoa Joe and Finn Bálor. On the October 21 episode of NXT, The Mechanics' ring name was changed to Dash and Dawson. The duo would go on win the NXT Tag Team Championship from The Vaudevillains on the November 11 episode of NXT. They subsequently defended the titles against Enzo Amore and Colin Cassady at NXT TakeOver: London. Beginning in February 2016, the duo began performing under the team name The Revival. The two made their main roster debuts on March 12, 2016, at Roadblock, again successfully defending their championships against Amore and Cassady.

On April 1 at NXT TakeOver: Dallas, The Revival lost the NXT Tag Team Championship to American Alpha (Chad Gable and Jason Jordan) but the two won back the titles from American Alpha two months later at NXT TakeOver: The End. At NXT TakeOver: Brooklyn II, The Revival retained the titles against Johnny Gargano and Tommaso Ciampa. In a rematch at NXT Takeover: Toronto, Tommaso Ciampa and Johnny Gargano won the NXT Tag Team Championship in a 2 out of 3 falls match. At NXT TakeOver: Orlando, Wilder and Dawson lost to The Authors of Pain in a triple threat match for the NXT Tag Team Championship, also involving DIY.

On the April 3 episode of Raw, The Revival answered an open challenge issued by The New Day. The Revival would defeat The New Day, and afterwards attacked Kofi Kingston, who was not participating in the match. On April 14, Dash Wilder fractured his jaw during an NXT match in Spartanburg, South Carolina against Hideo Itami and Shinsuke Nakamura which required surgery and would keep him out of action for eight weeks. Wilder returned to in ring competition on the June 26 taping of Main Event aired on June 30, teaming with Dawson to defeat Karl Anderson and Luke Gallows by pinfall. On the June 25, 2018 episode of Raw, Wilder pinned Roman Reigns in a tag team match. On SummerSlam pre-show, The Revival lost to The B-Team (Bo Dallas and Curtis Axel) in an attempt to become the Raw Tag Team Champions. At Survivor Series, they were part of Team Raw, but lost to Team SmackDown in the 10-on-10 Survivor Series tag team elimination match.

Following this they began a feud against Lucha House Party (Kalisto, Gran Metalik and Lince Dorado) and suffered various losses in handicap matches. On Raw, December 17, 2018, they defeated Lucha House Party, The B-Team and AOP in a Fatal 4-Way Match receiving a title shot for the Raw Tag Team Titles. During the next two Raw episodes they challenged Bobby Roode and Chad Gable for the titles but Dawson and Wilder were unsuccessful to win the matches in controversial fashion. Dave Meltzer of The Wrestling Observer reported that the duo asked for their release from their WWE contracts following their match against Lucha House Party on the January 14, 2019 episode of Raw. On February 11, 2019, episode of Raw, Dawson and Wilder defeated the team of Roode and Gable to win the Raw Tag Team Championships. At WrestleMania 35, The Revival lost the titles to the team of Curt Hawkins and Zack Ryder.

On the August 12, 2019 during a scheduled tag team match at Raw (the episode post-SummerSlam) in which The Revival were facing Lucha House Party (Lince Dorado and Gran Metalik, with Kalisto), R-Truth ran out from backstage, being chased by several wrestlers. The match was called off and The Revival performed a "Hart Attack" on Truth and simultaneously pinned him to become the first co-champions of the 24/7 Championship. However, in the same night R-Truth pinned Dawson, with the help of Carmella, and regained the title. The Revival began to align themselves with Randy Orton in a feud against The New Day. On September 15 at Clash of Champions, The Revival defeated Xavier Woods and Big E for the SmackDown Tag Team Championship, making them the first team to hold the Raw Tag Team Championship, SmackDown Tag Team Championship, and NXT Tag Team Championship. The Revival was drafted to SmackDown as part of the 2019 WWE Draft. On April 10, 2020, both Wilder and his tag team partner Dawson were released from their WWE contracts.

=== All Elite Wrestling / Ring of Honor (2020–present) ===
On the May 27, 2020 episode of Dynamite, Wheeler, now under the name Cash Wheeler made his All Elite Wrestling (AEW) debut alongside Dax Harwood (formerly Scott Dawson in WWE) as FTR, saving The Young Bucks from an attack by The Butcher and The Blade. They made their in-ring debut on the June 10 episode of Dynamite, defeating The Butcher and The Blade. In July, the duo signed multi-year contracts with AEW. On the August 12 episode of Dynamite, FTR attacked The Rock 'n' Roll Express during Tag Team Appreciation Night, turning heel and subsequently aligning themselves with Tully Blanchard, who became their manager. On August 27, they won a tag team gauntlet match on Dynamite to earn a match for the AEW World Tag Team Championship at All Out. At All Out on September 5, FTR defeated Kenny Omega and Hangman Page to win the titles for the first time. They lost the championship to The Young Bucks at Full Gear on November 7.

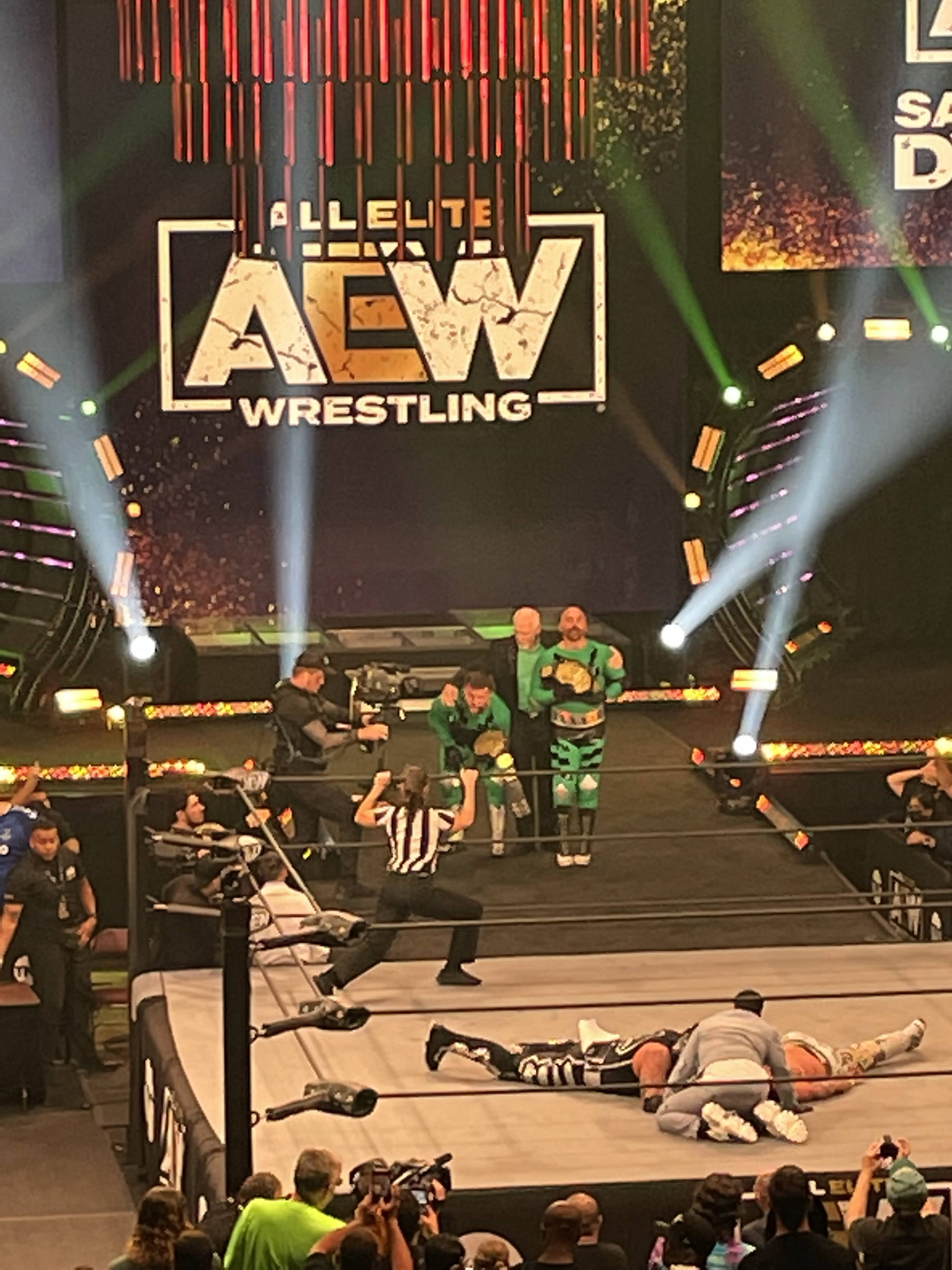
FTR winning the AAA World Tag Team Championship from The Lucha Bros in October 2021

On the March 10, 2021 episode of Dynamite, FTR and Blanchard joined MJF, Wardlow and Shawn Spears in attacking The Inner Circle, establishing the faction The Pinnacle. At Blood and Guts on May 5, The Pinnacle defeated The Inner Circle in the inaugural Blood and Guts match. At Double or Nothing on May 30, The Pinnacle lost to The Inner Circle in a Stadium Stampede match. On the October 16, 2021 episode of Dynamite, FTR, disguised as luchadors known as Las Super Ranas, defeated the Lucha Brothers to win the AAA World Tag Team Championship for the first time. Following the dissolution of The Pinnacle, FTR turned face and aligned with CM Punk in his feud with MJF. At Final Battle on December 11, FTR confronted the newly crowned ROH World Tag Team Champions, the Briscoe Brothers, beginning a rivalry that culminated at Supercard of Honor XV on April 1, 2022. FTR defeated the Briscoes to win the ROH World Tag Team Championship, becoming double champions alongside their AAA titles. On June 26, at AEW x NJPW: Forbidden Door, they defeated United Empire (Great-O-Khan and Jeff Cobb) and Roppongi Vice (Rocky Romero and Trent Beretta) in a three-way tag team match to win the IWGP Tag Team Championship, becoming triple champions. At Death Before Dishonor on July 23, 2022, FTR defeated the Briscoes in a two-out-of-three-falls match to retain the ROH titles. They lost the ROH titles to the Briscoes in a dog collar match at Final Battle on December 10, ending their reign at 253 days.

FTR returned at Revolution on March 5, 2023, confronting The Gunns after they retained the AEW World Tag Team Championship. On the April 5 episode of Dynamite, FTR defeated The Gunns to win the AEW World Tag Team Championship for the second time, after agreeing to leave AEW if they lost the match. They successfully defended the titles against The Young Bucks at All In on August 27 and Aussie Open at WrestleDream on October 1. On the October 7 episode of Collision, they lost the titles to Big Bill and Ricky Starks, ending their second reign at 185 days.

In 2024, FTR feuded with the House of Black and Blackpool Combat Club, losing to Jon Moxley and Claudio Castagnoli at Revolution on March 3. They later reached the finals of a tournament for the vacant AEW World Tag Team Championship but lost to The Young Bucks in a ladder match at Dynasty on April 21. FTR also faced The Young Bucks at Double or Nothing and All In, losing both matches.

On December 28, 2024, at Worlds End, FTR joined Adam Copeland in confronting the Death Riders, with the trio becoming known as Rated FTR. At Dynasty on April 6, 2025, Rated FTR unsuccessfully challenged the Death Riders for the AEW World Trios Championship. FTR then turned heel by attacking Copeland. On the April 23 episode of Dynamite, Stokely became their manager. At All Out on September 20, FTR lost to Copeland and Christian Cage. At Full Gear on November 22, they defeated Brodido to win the AEW World Tag Team Championship for a third time, tying the record for most reigns with the titles. They retained the titles against the Young Bucks at Revolution on March 15, 2026, and against Copeland and Cage at Dynasty on April 12. At Double or Nothing on May 24, FTR lost the titles to Copeland and Cage in an I Quit match, ending their third reign at 183 days.

FTR returned from a three-month hiatus at All In on August 30, confronting Copeland and Cage after their successful title defense against The Young Bucks. At All Out on September 26, FTR unsuccessfully challenged for the AEW World Tag Team Championship in a three-way ladder match won by The Young Bucks. In October, they began a best-of-five series against the Motor City Machine Guns (Alex Shelley and Chris Sabin), losing the first match at WrestleDream on October 17. The two teams would trade victories for the second, third, and fourth matches which would tie the series at 2-2. FTR lost the deciding match on the November 11 episode of Dynamite. Following the match, the two teams shook hands and showed their mutual respect. Three days later at Full Gear, FTR aligned themselves with the debuting Kasper Brothers (Jacob Kasper and Drew Kasper) after both teams attacked the Motor City Machine Guns and Young Bucks.

=== Lucha Libre AAA Worldwide (2021–2022) ===
On the October 16, 2021 at All Elite Wrestling's episode of Dynamite, FTR, disguised as luchadors known as Las Super Ranas, defeated the Lucha Brothers to win the AAA World Tag Team Championship for the first time. They lost the titles to Dralístico and Dragon Lee at AAA Noche de Campeones on December 28, 2022, ending their reign at 441 days.

=== New Japan Pro-Wrestling (2022–2023) ===
After winning the IWGP Tag Team Championships at AEW x NJPW: Forbidden Door, FTR made their first appearance for New Japan Pro-Wrestling, at Music City Mayhem, where they teamed with Alex Zayne, in a losing effort to United Empire's, Aussie Open and T. J. Perkins. After the match, Aussie Open challenged FTR to a match for the IWGP Tag Team Championships. FTR made their first IWGP Tag Team Championship defense on night one of Royal Quest II, defeating Aussie Open in the main event. On January 4, 2023 at Wrestle Kingdom 17, FTR lost the IWGP Tag Team Championships to Bishamon (Hirooki Goto and YOSHI-HASHI), ending their reign at 192 days.

== Other media ==
Wheeler made his video game debut as playable character Dash Wilder in WWE 2K17, and has since appeared in WWE 2K18, WWE 2K19, WWE 2K20 and AEW Fight Forever.

== Personal life ==
Wheeler stated in a May 2020 interview that out of all his matches up to this point in time, his favorites were live event matches between The Revival and American Alpha during their NXT days. He stated that his favorite on-screen match was the match between the two teams at NXT TakeOver: Dallas, as, while he believed that the match between The Revival and DIY at NXT TakeOver: Toronto in 2016 was better, NXT TakeOver: Dallas had "a special magical atmosphere". In a November 2020 interview, Wheeler described FTR's upcoming match with The Young Bucks at Full Gear as a "dream match", and added: "Dream match label or not, I think Dax and I always put a lot of pressure on ourselves, to go out there and perform at the highest level and to be the best. So, the match with The Young Bucks notwithstanding, we always have a lot of pressure on our shoulders."

On August 18, 2023, Wheeler was arrested in Orange County, Florida, and charged with one count of aggravated assault with a firearm, a third-degree felony, after turning himself in when an arrest warrant was issued following an alleged road rage incident. He was released from custody shortly thereafter when he posted $2,500 bail. On May 14, 2024, the charge against Wheeler was dropped. Wheeler opened up about the arrest and the circumstances surrounding it in a September 2024 interview with Renee Paquette. He asserted his innocence, claiming police had no evidence of any kind, not physical evidence nor video of the alleged incident, just the complainant's accusation. He also stated he was adamant in telling his attorneys he would not accept a plea deal, despite facing a 5-year maximum prison sentence if convicted. Wheeler would also reveal he contemplated retirement following his arrest, not wanting to cast a dark cloud over Dax Harwood, nor give AEW bad publicity as a result of his criminal charge, but he was ultimately talked out of retiring by Harwood. Wheeler has since relocated from Florida back to his home state of North Carolina.

== Championships and accomplishments ==
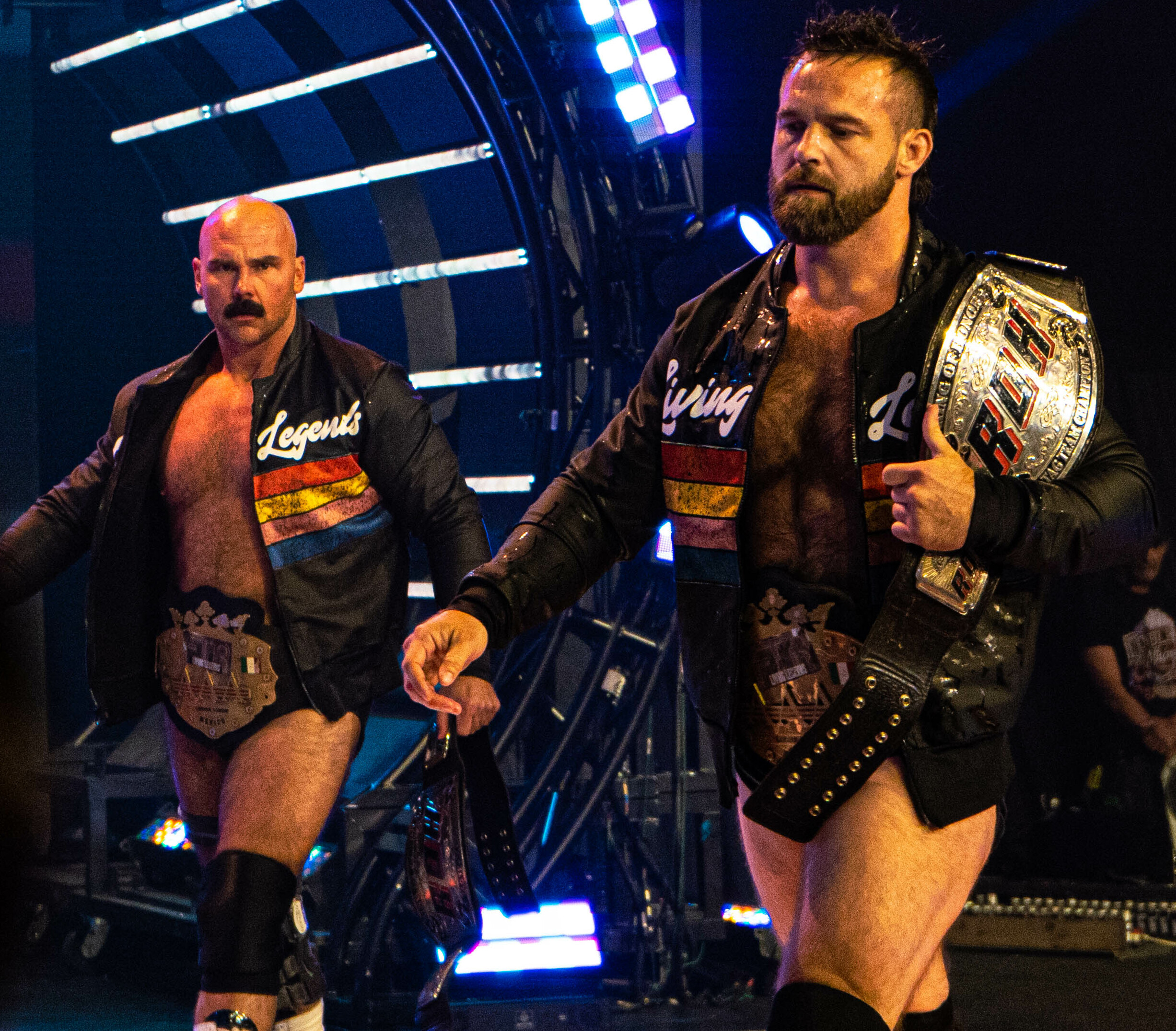
In 2022, FTR became the holders of three separate tag team championships (ROH, AAA, NJPW) all at the same time. They can be seen here carrying the AAA and ROH titles during their entrance at AEW x NJPW: Forbidden Door, the event where they captured the NJPW titles.

- All Elite Wrestling
  - AEW World Tag Team Championship (3 times) – with Dax Harwood
- Anarchy Wrestling
  - NWA Anarchy Tag Team Championship (2 times) – with Derrick Driver
  - NWA Anarchy Television Championship (1 time)
- The Baltimore Sun
  - WWE Tag Team of the Year (2016) – with Scott Dawson
- ESPN
  - Tag Team of the Year (2023 – with Dax Harwood)
- Lucha Libre AAA Worldwide
  - AAA World Tag Team Championship (1 time) – with Dax Harwood
- New Japan Pro Wrestling
  - IWGP Tag Team Championship (1 time) - with Dax Harwood
- Pro Wrestling Illustrated
  - Tag Team of the Year (2022) with Dax Hardwood
  - Ranked No. 98 of the top 500 singles wrestlers in the PWI 500 in 2019
- Ring of Honor
  - ROH World Tag Team Championship (1 time) - with Dax Harwood
- Sports Illustrated
  - Tag Team of the Year (2025) - with Dax Harwood
  - Ranked No. 9 of the top 10 wrestlers in 2022
- WrestleForce
  - WrestleForce Tag Team Championship (1 time) – with John Skyler
- WWE
  - WWE 24/7 Championship (1 time) – with Scott Dawson^{[a]}
  - WWE Raw Tag Team Championship (2 times) – with Scott Dawson
  - WWE SmackDown Tag Team Championship (1 time) – with Scott Dawson
  - NXT Tag Team Championship (2 times) – with Scott Dawson
  - First WWE Tag Team Triple Crown Champions – with Scott Dawson
  - NXT Year-End Award (2 times)
    - Match of the Year (2016) – with Scott Dawson vs. #DIY (Johnny Gargano and Tommaso Ciampa) in a two-out-of-three falls match for the NXT Tag Team Championship at NXT TakeOver: Toronto
    - Tag Team of the Year (2016) – with Scott Dawson

^{1} Wilder and Scott Dawson simultaneously pinned R-Truth to become co-WWE 24/7 Champions.

- Wrestling Observer Newsletter
  - Feud of the Year (2022) vs. The Briscoes
  - Tag Team of the Year (2022, 2023)
