= American Made (professional wrestling) =

Professional wrestling stable in WWE

Statistics
- Name: American Made
- Leader: Chad Gable
- Members: Julius Creed; Brutus Creed; Ivy Nile
- Debut: July 15, 2024
- Disbanded: November 6, 2026
- Years active: 2024–2026

American Made was an American professional wrestling stable in WWE which consisted of leader Chad Gable, the Creed Brothers (Julius Creed and Brutus Creed) and Ivy Nile. The stable was a successor to Gable's previous tag team (American Alpha) and stable (Alpha Academy), as well as the Creed Brothers and Nile's former stable (Diamond Mine).

== History ==
=== Formative years (2024–2025) ===
On the June 17, 2024 episode of Raw, after Chad Gable was abandoned by his Alpha Academy teammates Otis, Akira Tozawa, and Maxxine Dupri following the weeks of Gable's abuse towards them, he was attacked by the debuting Wyatt Sicks stable at the end of the broadcast. On the July 15 episode of Raw, Gable formed a stable with Julius and Brutus Creed with Nile. On the August 5 episode of Raw, the stable was officially named American Made, and they faced the Wyatt Sicks' Erick Rowan, Dexter Lumis and Joe Gacy in a six-man tag team match but failed to win the match.

=== El Grande Americano (2025–2026) ===
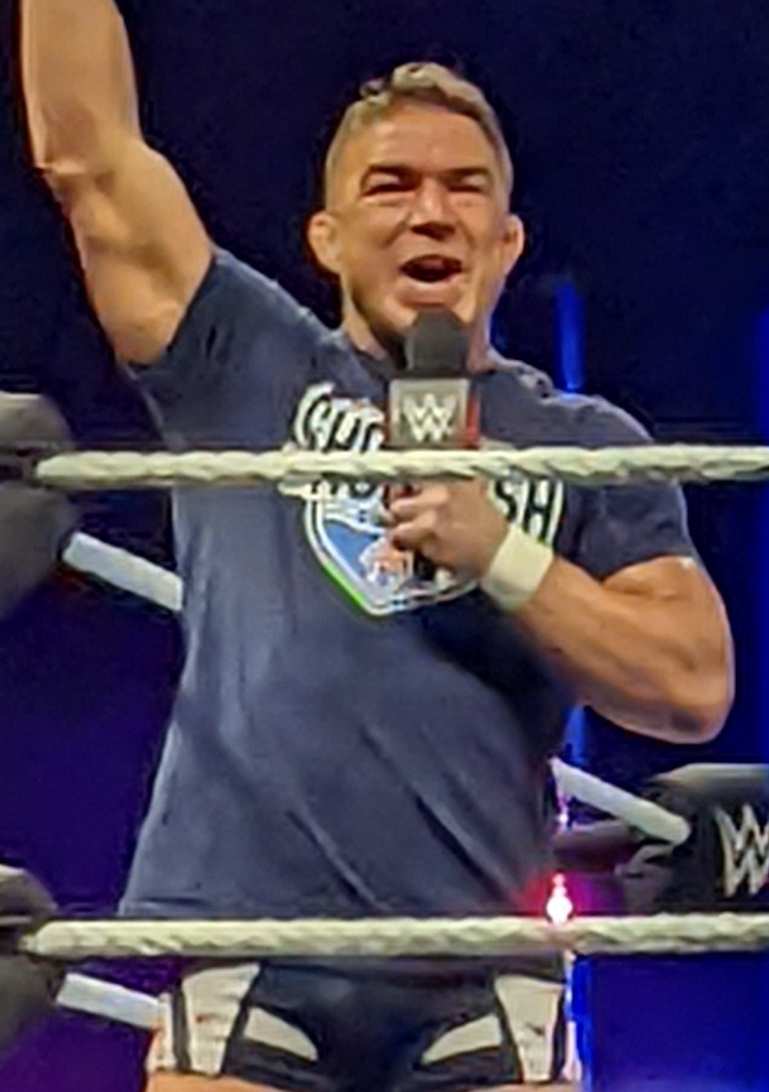
Chad Gable, the leader of the stable. Later, he also portrayed El Grande Americano gimmick.

On the January 13, 2025 episode of Raw, Gable lost to a debuting Penta. Gable, in kayfabe, went on a self-hiatus in a quest to "conquer the dark arts of lucha libre". On the March 10 episode of Raw, Gable under a new El Grande Americano persona, assisted The New Day (Kofi Kingston and Xavier Woods) to defeat Latino World Order (Rey Mysterio and Dragon Lee) in a tornado tag team match. At Worlds Collide on June 7, Gable failed to defeat El Hijo del Vikingo for the AAA Mega Championship. Soon after, Gable confirmed he suffered a legitimate rotator cuff injury and Ludwig Kaiser, whom took over the role of El Grande Americano, appeared. Kaiser's Americano featuered two Americano variants (Rayo Americano and Bravo Americano) which formed the Los Americanos stable.

Following Gable's return at Royal Rumble in 2026, Gable, now known as "The Original" turned face to confront El Grande Americano (II), whom was still potrayed by Kaiser. However, on the February 7 episode of Lucha Libre AAA on Fox, Gable's Americano character was established as a heel by attacking Americano (II), who was cheered as a babyface to the Mexican crowd, replacing his spot determining the Number #1 contender for the AAA Mega Championship at the Rey de Reyes. On the May 2 episode of Lucha Libre AAA on Fox, the Creed Brothers, in storyline, attacked Kaiser and reunited with Gable, establishing themselves as heels in Mexico. On the May 4 episode of Raw, a masked-up Creed Brothers were introduced as Los Hermanos Americanos (Bruto Credo and Julio Credo) as they joined with OG Americano, turning them faces in the process, in a trios match to defeat Los Americanos. At Noche de Los Grandes on May 30, after losing a Lucha de Apuestas Máscara contra Máscara No Disqualification match, Gable unmasked after being defeated by Kaiser. Following the match Gable turned face and American Made would begin to drift apart. On November 6, 2026, the stable officially disbanded when The Creed Brothers’ contract expired and they chose to not renew it.

== Members ==
*	Founding member(s)
L	Leader

=== Former ===
Members		Joined	Left
Chad Gable	(L)	July 15, 2024 *	November 6, 2026
Julius Creed		July 15, 2024 *	November 6, 2026
Brutus Creed		July 15, 2024 *	November 6, 2026
Ivy Nile		August 12, 2024	November 6, 2026

== Sub-groups ==
=== Current ===
Affiliate	Members	Tenure	Type
Creed Brothers	Julius Creed; Brutus Creed	2024–2026	Tag team

== Championships and accomplishments ==
- WWE
  - WWE Speed Championship #1 Contender Tournament (2025) – Gable
  - WWE Women's Speed Championship #1 Contender Tournament (2025) – Nile
