= Diamond Mine (professional wrestling) =

Stable
- Name: Diamond Mine
- Leader: Roderick Strong
- Members: See below
- Manager: Malcolm Bivens
- Debut: April 27, 2021
- Disbanded: July 15, 2024
- Years active: 2021–2024

Diamond Mine was a professional wrestling stable that performed in WWE on the NXT and Raw brands. The group was formed in June 2021, where it was originally led by Roderick Strong and also included Hachiman. The name and logo were derived from the original formation of Malcolm Bivens and Tyler Rust, where Bivens gave him the nickname Diamond in the Rust followed by pounding their fists. Strong was a former one-time NXT Cruiserweight Champion whereas the Creed Brothers were former one-time NXT Tag Team Champions. The stable was quietly disbanded in 2024 when the Creed Brothers and Ivy Nile joined the American Made stable led by Chad Gable.

== History ==
=== WWE (2021–2024) ===
==== NXT (2021–2023) ====
After the collapse of the Undisputed Era in early February, Roderick Strong would seemingly quit WWE, several weeks later vignettes would tease the debut of Diamond Mine, and he would make his return on June 22, 2021 episode of NXT attacking Kushida as the Diamond Mine stable alongside Tyler Rust (who was released on August 6 and was later replaced by the Creed Brothers and Ivy Nile) with Hachiman and Malcolm Bivens as their manager. On the September 21 episode of NXT 2.0, Strong defeated Kushida to win the NXT Cruiserweight Championship. At NXT WarGames, Strong defeated Joe Gacy to retain his championship. At NXT: New Year's Evil, he lost the title to NXT North American Champion Carmelo Hayes in a championship unification match.

Strong and the rest of Diamond Mine would slowly turn face at the start of 2022, when they entered a feud with Imperium. On January 5, 2022, Hachiman was released from WWE, ending his role as coach of the group. On February 15 at NXT Vengeance Day, the Creed Brothers defeated MSK to win the Men's Dusty Rhodes Tag Team Classic. On the February 17 edition of NXT, Bivens introduced Tatum Paxley as a new member of Diamond Mine, and she would become Nile's frequent tag team partner. At Worlds Collide, Damon Kemp betrayed Diamond Mine by costing the Creed Brothers the NXT Tag Team Championship. In November 2022, Strong's WWE contract expired, ending his time in the company and group. However, Strong's departure was not public knowledge until he debuted on the April 25, 2023 edition of AEW Dynamite.

On the March 14, 2023 episode of NXT, Paxley betrayed Nile, thus also effectively leaving Diamond Mine. On the July 4 episode of NXT, the Creed Brothers left the brand after losing a Loser Leaves NXT match to the Dyad. However, on the August 29 edition of NXT, the Creed Brothers defeated the Dyad in a steel cage match to reinstate them to NXT.

==== Raw (2023–2024) ====
The Creed Brothers and Ivy Nile made their main roster debut on the October 30 episode of Raw. The following week, they officially signed for the Raw brand.

On the July 14, 2024 episode of Raw, the Creed Brothers aligned themselves with Chad Gable forming the American Made stable. Nile subsequently joined them on the August 12 episode of Raw.

== Members ==
*	Founding members
M	Manager
L	Leader

=== Former ===
Member	Joined	Left
Roderick Strong (L)	June 22, 2021 *	October 11, 2022
Tyler Rust	June 22, 2021 *	August 6, 2021
Hachiman	June 22, 2021 *	January 5, 2022
Malcolm Bivens (M)	June 22, 2021 *	April 29, 2022
Julius Creed	August 24, 2021	July 15, 2024
Brutus Creed	August 24, 2021	July 15, 2024
Ivy Nile	September 14, 2021	July 15, 2024
Tatum Paxley	February 15, 2022	March 14, 2023
Damon Kemp	May 10, 2022	September 4, 2022

== Sub-groups ==
Affiliate	Members	Tenure	Type
The Creed Brothers	Brutus Creed; Julius Creed	2021–2024	Tag team

== Championships and accomplishments ==
- Pro Wrestling Illustrated
  - Ranked Strong No. 269 of the top 500 singles wrestlers in the PWI 500 in 2021
  - Ranked Tyler Rust No. 192 of the top 500 singles wrestlers in the PWI 500 in 2021
  - Ranked Nile No. 207 of the top 250 female singles wrestlers in the PWI Women's 250 in 2023
- WWE
  - NXT Cruiserweight Championship (1 time) – Roderick Strong
  - NXT Tag Team Championship (1 time) – Creed Brothers
  - Men's Dusty Rhodes Tag Team Classic (2022) – Creed Brothers
  - NXT Year-End Award
    - Tag Team of the Year (2023) – Creed Brothers
