= Dax Harwood =

American professional wrestler (born 1984)

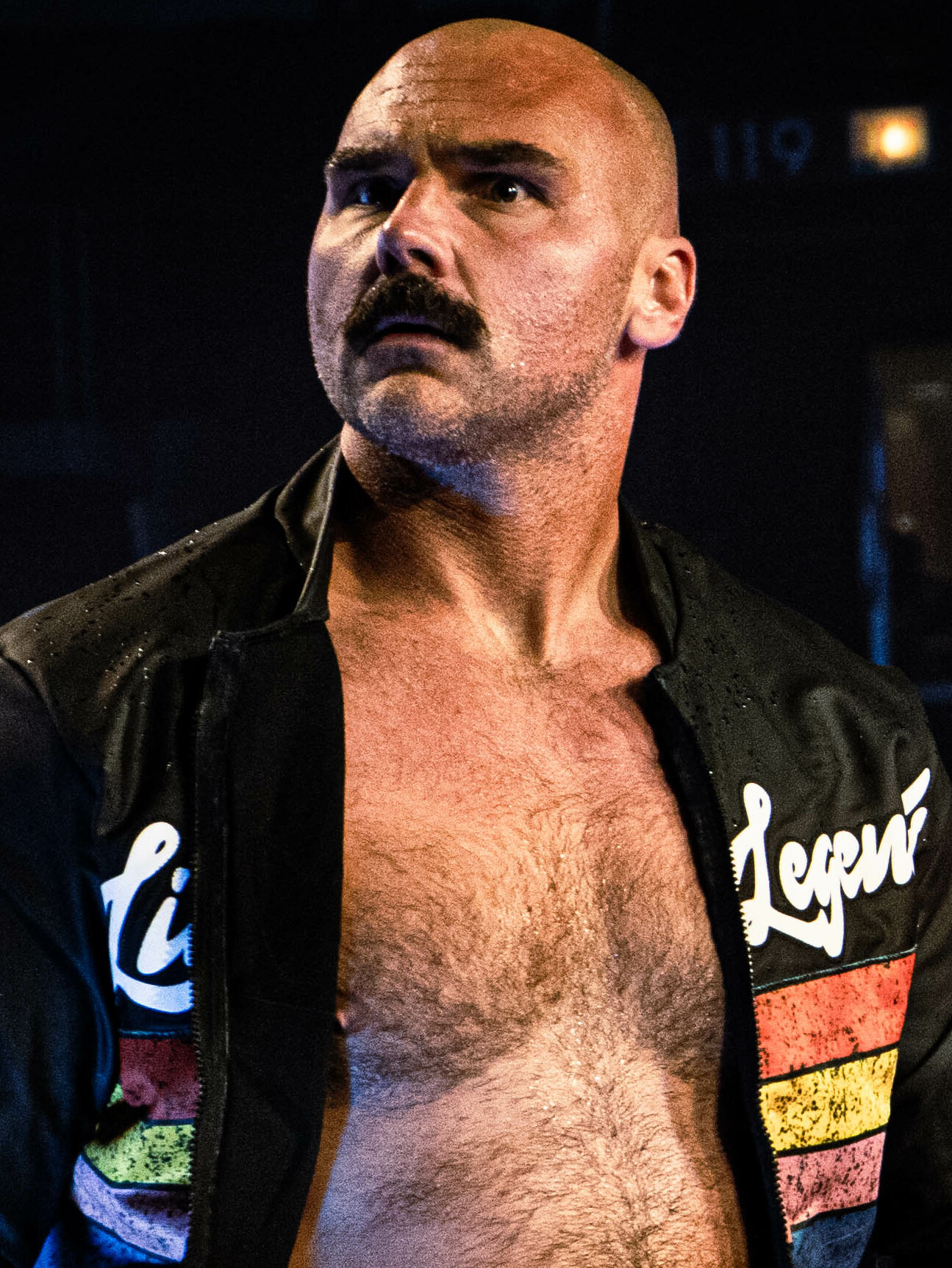
- Harwood in 2022

Personal information
- Born: David Michael Harwood; June 30, 1984 (age 42) Whiteville, North Carolina, U.S.
- Education: University of North Carolina Wilmington
- Spouse: Maria Nickolopoulos (m. 2012)
- Children: 1

Professional wrestling career
- Ring name(s): Dax Harwood; Dennis Laundry; KC Anderson; KC McKnight; Scott Dawson
- Billed height: 5 ft 10 in (178 cm)
- Billed weight: 223 lb (101 kg)
- Billed from: Asheville, North Carolina; Kill Devil Hills, North Carolina
- Trained by: The Maestro; WWE Performance Center
- Debut: August 13, 2004

David Michael Harwood (born June 30, 1984) is an American professional wrestler. He is signed to All Elite Wrestling (AEW), where he performs under the ring name Dax Harwood and is one-half of FTR with Cash Wheeler. With Wheeler, he is a former three-time AEW World Tag Team Champion.

He is best known for his time in WWE, where he performed under the ring name Scott Dawson. In WWE, he and Wheeler (then known as Dash Wilder) were known as The Revival, and held the Raw (twice), SmackDown and NXT Tag Team Championship (twice), making them the first ever WWE Tag Team Triple Crown winners, and jointly held the WWE 24/7 Championship along with Wheeler. He has also appeared in New Japan Pro-Wrestling (NJPW), Ring of Honor (ROH), Revolution Pro Wrestling (RevPro), and Lucha Libre AAA Worldwide (AAA), where he and Wheeler have won those promotions' respective tag team championships once each.

== Professional wrestling career ==
=== Early career (2004–2012) ===
Harwood made his professional wrestling debut in 2004. He wrestled for a variety of independent promotions as KC McKnight, most notably for CWF Mid-Atlantic, AWA Superstars of Wrestling and a number of NWA-affiliated organizations including NWA Anarchy and Pro Wrestling Zero1. In 2010, he made an appearance for Ring of Honor (ROH) in a dark match prior to ROH The Big Bang!. He also wrestled at various North Carolina independents including United Professional Wrestling Association in Wilmington, working with the likes of Zane and Dave Dawson, Daniel Messina, Charlie Dreamer, Marcus Shields, etc.

=== WWE (2012–2020) ===
==== Early NXT appearances (2012–2014) ====
Harwood signed with WWE in 2012 and was assigned to the WWE Performance Center, taking the ring name Scott Dawson. He made his television debut on March 7, 2013 episode of NXT, teaming with Judas Devlin in a two-on-one handicap loss to Adrian Neville. Dawson made a further appearance in an enhancement role on April 10 episode of NXT, in a six-man tag-team defeat against The Shield.

In May 2013, Dawson formed a tag-team with Garrett Dylan, with the two managed by Sylvester Lefort. On June 26 episode of NXT Dawson and Dylan lost a number one contender's match for the NXT Tag Team Championship to Corey Graves and Kassius Ohno. The team disbanded shortly afterwards when Dylan was released from the company. Following Dylan's release, Dawson initially worked as a singles competitor with little success and then formed a tag-team with Alexander Rusev, who was also being managed by Lefort. Rusev and Dawson participated unsuccessfully in a contendership battle royal for the NXT Tag Team Championship on September 12 episode of NXT. Their alliance ended when Rusev turned on Lefort in favor of being managed by Lana, and shortly afterwards Dawson suffered a torn anterior cruciate ligament which ruled him out of action for several months.

==== The Revival (2014–2020) ====
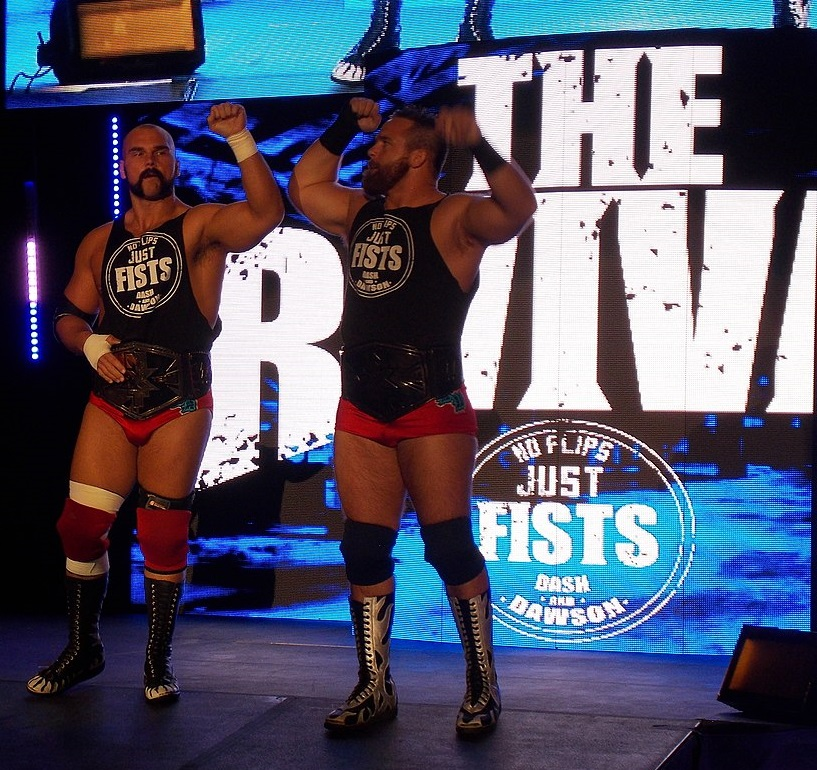
Dawson (left) with Dash Wilder as the NXT Tag Team Champions in 2016

On his return from injury, Dawson formed a team with Dash Wilder, with the two performing extensively at live events under the name The Mechanics. The duo made their debut on July 31, 2014 episode of NXT, losing to the team of Bull Dempsey and Mojo Rawley. The duo made only one further televised appearance in 2014, losing to Enzo Amore and Colin Cassady on October 23 episode of NXT, but continued to wrestle extensively at house shows. On the June 10, 2015 episode of NXT, Dawson faced Samoa Joe in a losing effort during the show's main event.

Dawson and Wilder's team resurfaced and picked up their first televised win on the July 29, 2015 episode of NXT, defeating Amore and Cassady. The duo were involved in an 8-man tag-team match that was taped prior to NXT TakeOver: Brooklyn. At NXT TakeOver: Respect, Dawson and Wilder were defeated in the semi-finals of the Dusty Rhodes Tag Team Classic by eventual winners Finn Bálor and Samoa Joe. On the October 21 episode of NXT, The Mechanics' team name was changed to Dash and Dawson. On the November 11 episode of NXT, Dawson and Wilder defeated the Vaudevillains to win the NXT Tag Team Championship. They subsequently defended the titles against Enzo Amore and Colin Cassady at NXT TakeOver: London. Beginning in February 2016, the duo began performing under the team name The Revival. Dawson made his WWE main roster debut alongside Wilder at Roadblock, once again defending their NXT Tag Team Championships against Amore and Cassady. On April 1 at NXT TakeOver: Dallas, The Revival lost the NXT Tag Team Championship to American Alpha (Chad Gable and Jason Jordan) but the two won back the titles from American Alpha two months later at NXT TakeOver: The End. At NXT TakeOver: Brooklyn II, The Revival retained the titles against Johnny Gargano and Tommaso Ciampa. On November 19, 2016 at NXT TakeOver: Toronto The Revival lost the tag team titles in a two out of three falls match to #DIY (Tommaso Ciampa and Johnny Gargano). They failed in their attempt at winning back the titles at NXT TakeOver: Orlando on April 1, 2017; in a triple threat tag team elimination match.

On the Raw after WrestleMania 33 April 3 episode of Raw, The Revival answered an open challenge issued by The New Day. The Revival defeated The New Day, and afterwards attacked Kofi Kingston, who was not participating in the match. The team was on hiatus due to Wilder's injury. Wilder returned seven weeks later on the May 22, 2017 episode of Raw, walking backstage during the sneak attack on Enzo Amore, Big Cass would later accuse both Wilder and Dawson as the attackers, but they denied this. Two weeks later, on the Raw after Extreme Rules, The Revival also denied their involvement during the sneak attack on Cass, bringing out another suspect in Big Show.

The June 19, 2017 episode of Raw revealed that The Revival had nothing to do with the attack, and that Cass was never attacked. Corey Graves finally came to the conclusion that Cass was indeed the culprit behind Enzo's sneak attack after The Revival stated their alibi of being innocent. Wilder returned to in ring competition on the June 26 taping of Main Event aired on June 30, teaming with Dawson to defeat Karl Anderson and Luke Gallows by pinfall, Dawson would have his first pinfall loss to Kalisto the following week.

On August 7, 2017, WWE announced that over the weekend of August 5–6 at a live event in Canada, Dawson suffered an injury to his right bicep in a match against Cesaro and Sheamus. He was out of action for 5 to 6 months. Dawson returned on the December 18 episode of Raw with Wilder to defeat Heath Slater and Rhyno. The Revival participated in the Raw Tag Team Eliminator tournament to crown new champions, but lost in the semi-finals to Matt Hardy and Bray Wyatt. At SummerSlam 2018 Pre-show, The Revival lost to Bo Dallas and Curtis Axel in an attempt to become the new Raw Tag Team champions. At Survivor Series, they were part of Team Raw, but lost to Team SmackDown in the 10-on-10 Survivor Series tag team elimination match.

Following this they began a feud against Lucha House Party and suffered various losses in handicap matches. On the December 17, 2018 episode of Raw, they defeated Lucha House Party, The B-Team and AOP in a Fatal 4-Way Match receiving a title shot for the Raw Tag Team Titles. During the next two Raw episodes they challenged Bobby Roode and Chad Gable for the titles but Dawson and Wilder were unsuccessful to win the matches in controversial fashion.

Dave Meltzer of The Wrestling Observer reported that the duo asked for their release from their WWE contracts following their match against Lucha House Party on the January 14, 2019 episode of Raw. On the February 11, 2019 episode of Raw, Dawson and Wilder defeated the team of Roode and Gable to win the Raw Tag Team Championships. They lost their titles at WrestleMania 35 to the team of Zack Ryder and Curt Hawkins. On the August 12, 2019 during a scheduled tag team match at Raw episode post-SummerSlam in which The Revival were facing Lucha House Party (Lince Dorado and Gran Metalik, with Kalisto), R-Truth ran out from backstage, being chased by several wrestlers. The match was called off and The Revival performed a "Hart Attack" on Truth and simultaneously pinned him to become the first co-champions of the 24/7 Championship. Moments later, R-Truth pinned Dawson, with the help of Carmella, and regained the title. The Revival began to align themselves with Randy Orton in a feud against The New Day. On September 15 at Clash of Champions, The Revival defeated Xavier Woods and Big E for the SmackDown Tag Team Championship, making them the first team to hold the Raw Tag Team Championship, SmackDown Tag Team Championship, and NXT Tag Team Championship. The Revival was drafted to SmackDown as part of the 2019 WWE Draft. On April 10, 2020, both Dawson and his tag team partner Dash Wilder were released from their WWE contracts.

=== All Elite Wrestling / Ring of Honor (2020–present) ===
On the May 27, 2020 episode of Dynamite, Harwood, now going by the name Dax Harwood made his All Elite Wrestling (AEW) debut alongside Cash Wheeler (formerly Dash Wilder in WWE) as FTR, saving The Young Bucks from an attack by The Butcher and The Blade. They made their in-ring debut on the June 10 episode of Dynamite, defeating The Butcher and The Blade. In July, the duo signed multi-year contracts with AEW.

On the August 12 episode of Dynamite, FTR attacked The Rock 'n' Roll Express during Tag Team Appreciation Night, turning heel and subsequently aligning themselves with Tully Blanchard, who became their manager. On August 27, they won a tag team gauntlet match on Dynamite to earn a match for the AEW World Tag Team Championship at All Out. At All Out on September 5, FTR defeated Kenny Omega and Hangman Page to win the titles for the first time. They lost the championship to The Young Bucks at Full Gear on November 7.

On the March 10, 2021 episode of Dynamite, FTR and Blanchard joined MJF, Wardlow and Shawn Spears in attacking The Inner Circle, establishing the faction The Pinnacle. At Blood and Guts on May 5, The Pinnacle defeated The Inner Circle in the inaugural Blood and Guts match. At Double or Nothing on May 30, The Pinnacle lost to The Inner Circle in a Stadium Stampede match.

On the October 16, 2021 episode of Dynamite, FTR, disguised as luchadors known as Las Super Ranas, defeated the Lucha Brothers to win the AAA World Tag Team Championship for the first time. Following the dissolution of The Pinnacle, FTR turned face and aligned with CM Punk in his feud with MJF. At Final Battle on December 11, FTR confronted the newly crowned ROH World Tag Team Champions, the Briscoe Brothers, beginning a rivalry that culminated at Supercard of Honor XV on April 1, 2022. FTR defeated the Briscoes to win the ROH World Tag Team Championship, becoming double champions alongside their AAA titles. On the April 27 episode of Dynamite, Harwood defeated Wheeler in an Owen Hart Foundation Men's Tournament qualifying match, advancing to the tournament's first round. He was eliminated by Adam Cole on the May 11 episode of Dynamite. On June 26, at AEW x NJPW: Forbidden Door, they defeated United Empire (Great-O-Khan and Jeff Cobb) and Roppongi Vice (Rocky Romero and Trent Beretta) in a three-way tag team match to win the IWGP Tag Team Championship, becoming triple champions. At Death Before Dishonor on July 23, 2022, FTR defeated the Briscoes in a two-out-of-three-falls match to retain the ROH titles. They lost the ROH titles to the Briscoes in a dog collar match at Final Battle on December 10, ending their reign at 253 days.

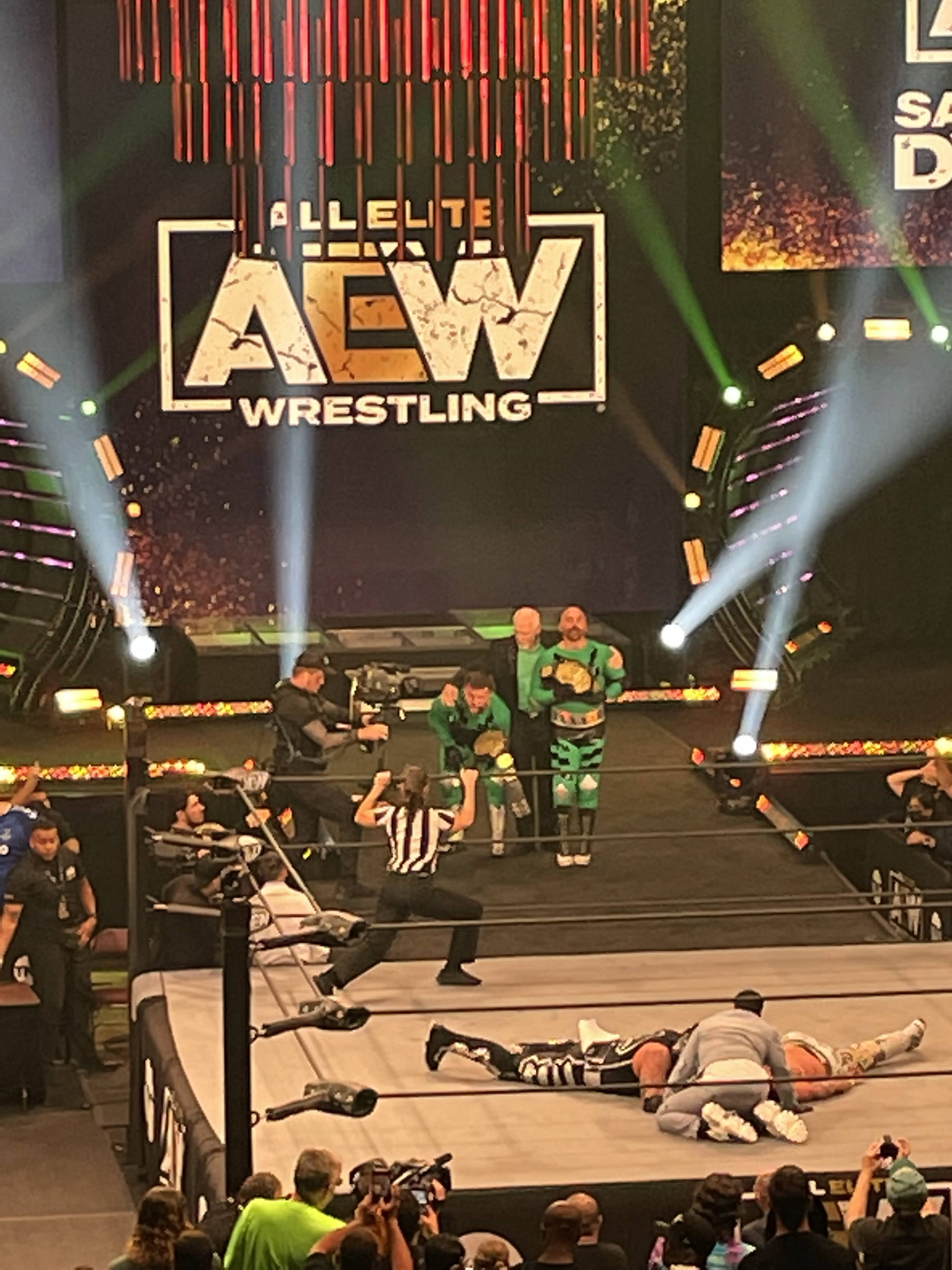
FTR winning the AAA World Tag Team Championship from The Lucha Bros in October 2021

FTR returned at Revolution on March 5, 2023, confronting The Gunns after they retained the AEW World Tag Team Championship. On the April 5 episode of Dynamite, FTR defeated The Gunns to win the AEW World Tag Team Championship for the second time, after agreeing to leave AEW if they lost the match. They successfully defended the titles against The Young Bucks at All In on August 27 and Aussie Open at WrestleDream on October 1. On the October 7 episode of Collision, they lost the titles to Big Bill and Ricky Starks, ending their second reign at 185 days.

In 2024, FTR feuded with the House of Black and Blackpool Combat Club, losing to Jon Moxley and Claudio Castagnoli at Revolution on March 3. They later reached the finals of a tournament for the vacant AEW World Tag Team Championship but lost to The Young Bucks in a ladder match at Dynasty on April 21. FTR also faced The Young Bucks at Double or Nothing and All In, losing both matches.

On December 28, 2024, at Worlds End, FTR joined Adam Copeland in confronting the Death Riders, with the trio becoming known as Rated FTR. At Dynasty on April 6, 2025, Rated FTR unsuccessfully challenged the Death Riders for the AEW World Trios Championship. FTR then turned heel by attacking Copeland. On the April 23 episode of Dynamite, Stokely became their manager. At All Out on September 20, FTR lost to Copeland and Christian Cage. At Full Gear on November 22, they defeated Brodido to win the AEW World Tag Team Championship for a third time, tying the record for most reigns with the titles. They retained the titles against the Young Bucks at Revolution on March 15, 2026, and against Copeland and Cage at Dynasty on April 12. At Double or Nothing on May 24, FTR lost the titles to Copeland and Cage in an I Quit match, ending their third reign at 183 days.

FTR returned from a three-month hiatus at All In on August 30, confronting Copeland and Cage after their successful title defense against The Young Bucks. At All Out on September 26, FTR unsuccessfully challenged for the AEW World Tag Team Championship in a three-way ladder match won by The Young Bucks. In October, they began a best-of-five series against the Motor City Machine Guns (Alex Shelley and Chris Sabin), losing the first match at WrestleDream on October 17. The two teams would trade victories for the second, third, and fourth matches which would tie the series at 2-2. FTR lost the deciding match on the November 11 episode of Dynamite. Following the match, the two teams shook hands and showed their mutual respect. Three days later at Full Gear, FTR aligned themselves with the debuting Kasper Brothers (Jacob Kasper and Drew Kasper) after both teams attacked the Motor City Machine Guns and Young Bucks.

=== Lucha Libre AAA Worldwide (2021–2022) ===
On the October 16, 2021 at All Elite Wrestling's episode of Dynamite, FTR, disguised as luchadors known as Las Super Ranas, defeated the Lucha Brothers to win the AAA World Tag Team Championship for the first time. They lost the titles to Dralístico and Dragon Lee at AAA Noche de Campeones on December 28, 2022, ending their reign at 441 days.

=== New Japan Pro-Wrestling (2022–2023) ===
After winning the IWGP Tag Team Championships at AEW x NJPW: Forbidden Door, FTR made their first appearance for New Japan Pro-Wrestling, at Music City Mayhem, where they teamed with Alex Zayne, in a losing effort to United Empire's, Aussie Open and T. J. Perkins. After the match, Aussie Open challenged FTR to a match for the IWGP Tag Team Championships. FTR made their first IWGP Tag Team Championship defense on night one of Royal Quest II, defeating Aussie Open in the main event. On January 4, 2023 at Wrestle Kingdom 17, FTR lost the IWGP Tag Team Championships to Bishamon (Hirooki Goto and YOSHI-HASHI), ending their reign at 192 days.

== Other media ==
Harwood made his video game debut as a playable character in WWE 2K17, and has since appeared in WWE 2K18, WWE 2K19, and WWE 2K20. After joining All Elite Wrestling, he appeared in their debut video game AEW Fight Forever under the same name.

In December 2022, Harwood began a podcast with co-host Matt Koon on the AdFreeShows network called FTR with Dax Harwood. The launch was announced on the last episode of William Regal's Gentleman Villain podcast which was ending due to Regal's return to WWE. The podcast was short-lived and ended in April 2023 after 17 episodes. The cancellation was a surprise announcement in the episode titled Anxiety. Harwood explained that the podcast was having a negative effect on his mental health and that both he and Koon thought it was doing more harm than good to the professional wrestling business. Koon went on the assert that there was no pressure from management at All Elite Wrestling to end the podcast and neither Harwood nor Koon ruled out bringing the podcast back in the future.

== Personal life ==
Harwood has been married to Maria Nikolopoulos since 2012. Together, they have a daughter, Finley Gray (born 2014). He played college football at East Carolina University before transferring to the University of North Carolina at Wilmington and getting a degree in business communication. His family's home in Whiteville, North Carolina, was severely damaged by Hurricane Florence.

Harwood stated in a May 2020 interview that, out of all his matches up to this point in time, his all-time favorite was a two-out-of-three falls match between The Revival and American Alpha which took place during a live event, while his favorite on-screen match was The Revival's two-out-of-three falls match against DIY at NXT TakeOver: Toronto in 2016. He said: "In WWE, that'll be our legacy. I'm very very proud of that match." In a November 7, 2020 interview, Harwood described FTR's upcoming match with The Young Bucks at Full Gear as a "dream match". He added: "When you go around calling yourself the best tag team of the generation, you cannot get too much more pressure than that. So, this match, to a lot of people, it is a dream match and it is a match we are excited about." On November 11, 2020, four days after Full Gear, Harwood released a statement on his Twitter page expressing praise for this match with the Young Bucks and hoped for a rematch. On April 4, 2022, Harwood stated on Twitter that their match with The Briscoe Brothers at Supercard of Honor XV was the best match of FTR's career, also describing it as "their masterpiece".

== Championships and accomplishments ==
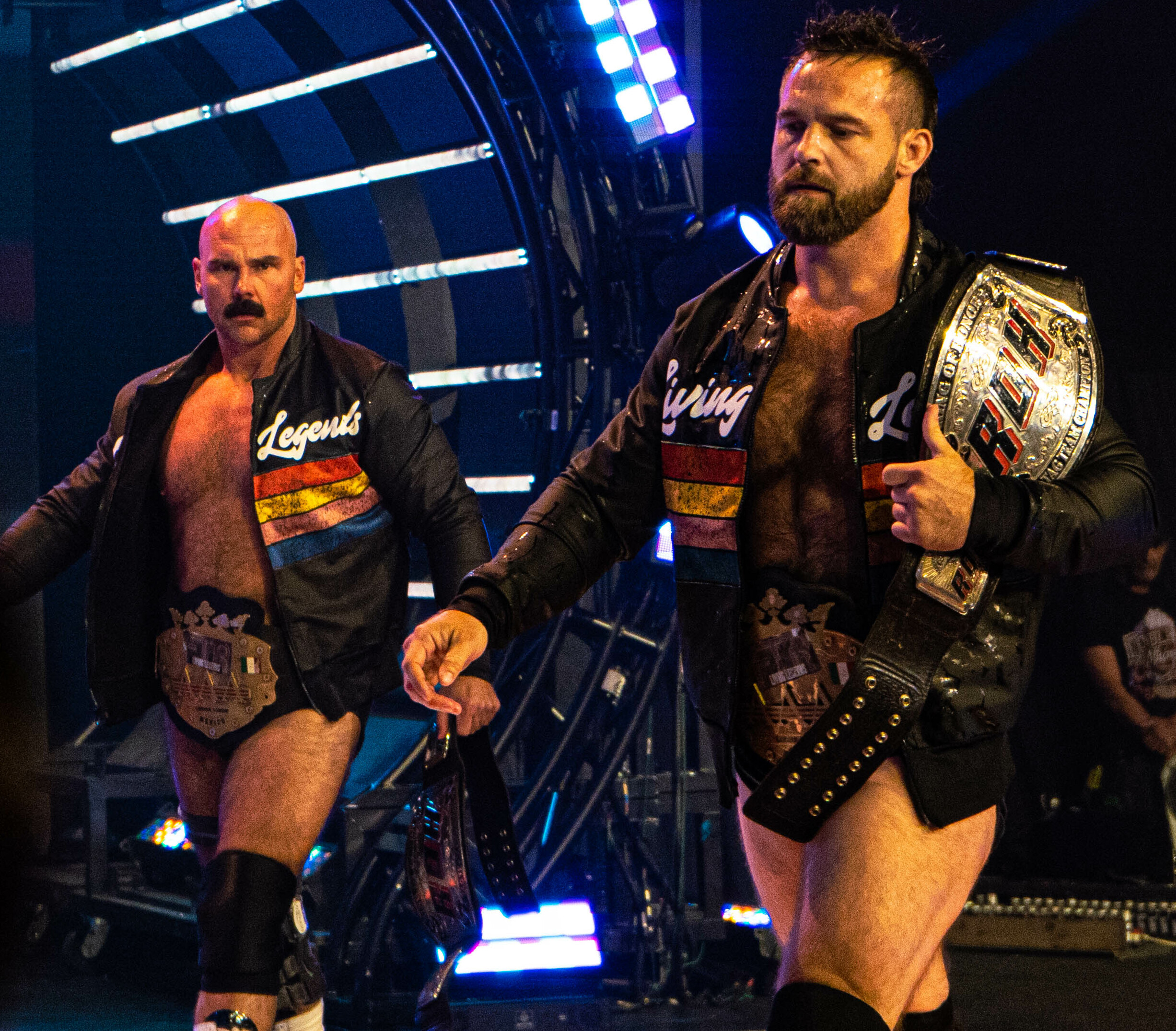
In 2022, FTR became the holders of three separate tag team championships (ROH, AAA, NJPW) all at the same time. They can be seen here carrying the AAA and ROH titles during their entrance at AEW x NJPW: Forbidden Door, the event where they captured the NJPW titles.

- All Elite Wrestling
  - AEW World Tag Team Championship (3 times) – with Cash Wheeler
- The Baltimore Sun
  - WWE Tag Team of the Year (2016) – with Dash Wilder
- ESPN
  - Tag Team of the Year (2023 – with Cash Wheeler)
- Lucha Libre AAA Worldwide
  - AAA World Tag Team Championship (1 time) - with Cash Wheeler
- New Japan Pro Wrestling
  - IWGP Tag Team Championship (1 time) - with Cash Wheeler
- Pro Wrestling Illustrated
  - Tag Team of the Year (2022) with Cash Wheeler
  - Ranked No. 103 of the top 500 singles wrestlers in the PWI 500 in 2019
- Ring of Honor
  - ROH World Tag Team Championship (1 time) - with Cash Wheeler
- Sports Illustrated
  - Tag Team of the Year (2025) - with Cash Wheeler
  - Ranked No. 8 of the top 10 wrestlers in 2022
- WWE
  - WWE 24/7 Championship (1 time) – with Dash Wilder^{[a]}
  - WWE Raw Tag Team Championship (2 times) – with Dash Wilder
  - WWE SmackDown Tag Team Championship (1 time) – with Dash Wilder
  - NXT Tag Team Championship (2 times) – with Dash Wilder
  - First WWE Tag Team Triple Crown Champions – with Dash Wilder
  - NXT Year-End Award (2 times)
    - Match of the Year (2016) – with Dash Wilder vs. #DIY (Johnny Gargano and Tommaso Ciampa) in a two-out-of-three falls match for the NXT Tag Team Championship at NXT TakeOver: Toronto
    - Tag Team of the Year (2016) – with Dash Wilder
- Wrestling Observer Newsletter
  - Feud of the Year (2022) vs. The Briscoes
  - Tag Team of the Year (2022, 2023)

== Notes ==
^{1} Dawson and Dash Wilder simultaneously pinned R-Truth to become co-WWE 24/7 Champions.
