= Stokely Hathaway =

American professional wrestler and manager (born 1990)

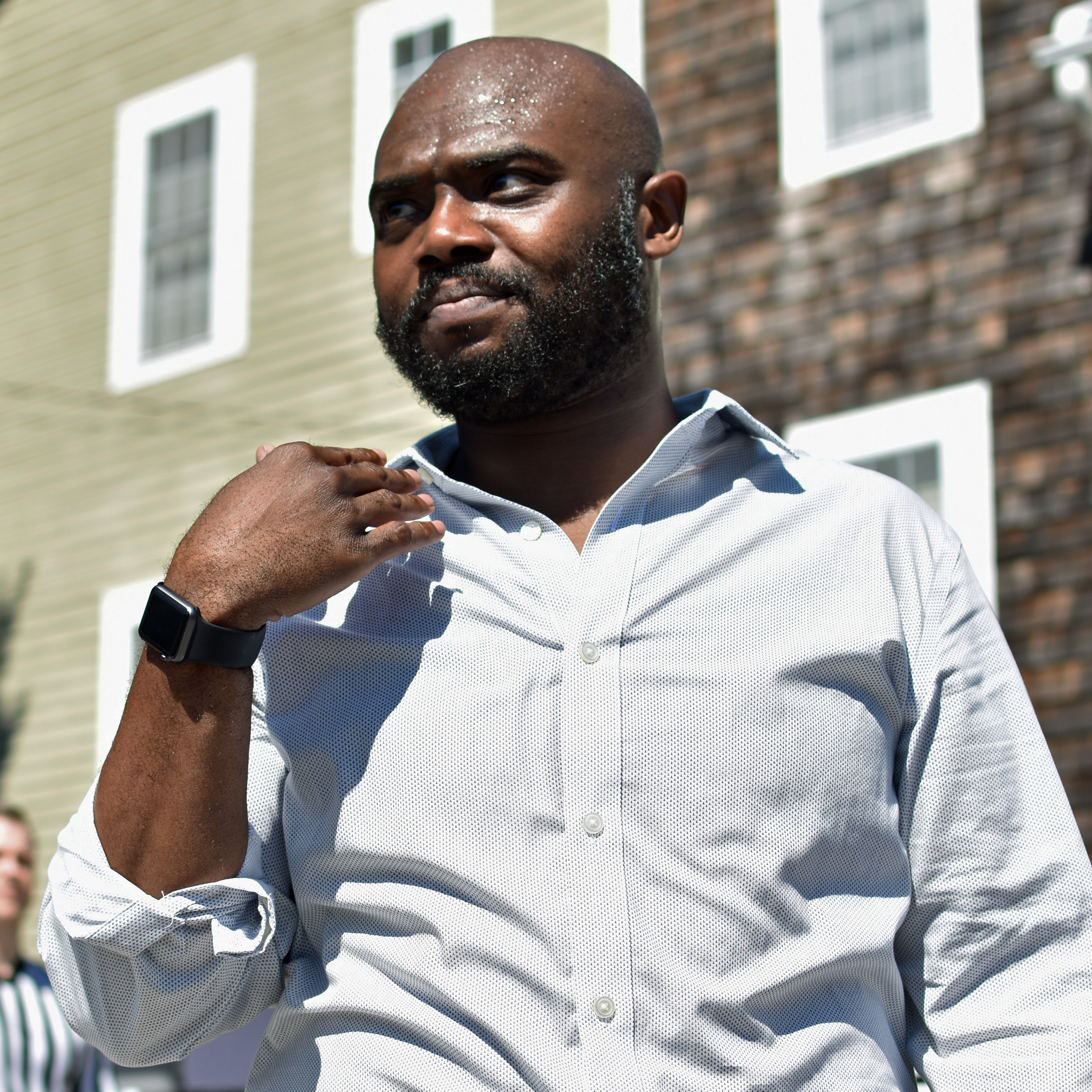
- Hathaway in 2018

Personal information
- Born: Stokely Hathaway; November 12, 1990 (age 36) Harlem, New York, U.S.

Professional wrestling career
- Ring name(s): Chuck Taylor™ Court Moore; Malcolm Bivens; Ramon; Stokely; Stokely Hathaway
- Billed height: 5 ft 8 in (173 cm)
- Billed weight: 174 lb (79 kg)
- Trained by: Chikara Wrestle Factory; Claudio Castagnoli; Delirious; Mike Quackenbush; ROH Dojo; WWE Performance Center
- Debut: 2014

Stokely Hathaway (born November 12, 1990) is an American professional wrestling manager and wrestler. He is signed to All Elite Wrestling (AEW), where he performs mononymously as Stokely. He is the on-screen manager for FTR (Cash Wheeler and Dax Harwood) and the Kasper Brothers (Drew Kasper and Jacob Kasper). He is also known for his time in WWE on their NXT brand, as manager to the Diamond Mine, using the ring name Malcolm Bivens.

== Professional wrestling career ==
=== Ring of Honor (2014–2016) ===
On April 18, 2014, Hathaway had the first match of his career, teaming with Moose as they unsuccessfully challenged The Brutal Burgers ("Brutal" Bob Evans & Cheeseburger). He soon became a member of Prince Nana's villainous stable The Embassy. He adopted the managing role and performed for a while under the name Ramon, where he most notably managed Moose. On March 28, 2016, Hathaway made his last appearance at ROH.

=== Independent circuit (2016–2019) ===
Stokely Hathaway started on the indie circuit in 2016 after leaving Ring of Honor, working for companies such as Beyond Wrestling. Hathaway managed a group called "The Dream Team," which consisted of Maxwell Jacob Friedman (MJF), Faye Jackson (the First Lady of The Dream Team), and Thomas Sharp. Hathaway was involved in a rivalry with Orange Cassidy.

=== Evolve (2016–2018) ===
On April 2, 2016, at EVOLVE 59, Hathaway debuted in Evolve as TJP's manager, where he unsuccessfully challenged Tommy End. After a brief stint managing Timothy Thatcher, Hathaway became a member of EVOLVE's leading stable Catch Point, remaining in a managerial role. Hathaway had his first Evolve match at Evolve 110, where he teamed with Chris Dickinson and Dominic Garrini in a losing effort against The Skulk. At Evolve 111, Hathaway teamed with Dickinson, where they unsuccessfully challenged Tracy Williams. Hathaway and Williams' careers were on the line in an "I Quit" match, and Hathaway's career with Evolve ended as a result of the loss. Although Hathaway had to leave Evolve after Evolve 111, he made a surprise appearance on September 8, 2018, where he unsuccessfully challenged Chris Dickinson, his final Evolve appearance.

=== Major League Wrestling (2017–2018) ===
In 2017, Stokely started in Major League Wrestling (MLW) as a manager of Black Friday Management. Hathaway managed Low Ki during the time before Major League Wrestling, secured their television deal with BeIN Sports in March 2018. Due to already having a television deal with Evolve Wrestling Stokley Hathaway, Matt Riddle, Darby Allin, and Priscilla Kelly all had to leave MLW once their television tapings started. MLW wrote Stokley Hathaway off of TV by him being kidnapped by random kidnappers. Later in 2018 Stokley resurfaced in MLW in the crowd, however after that single appearance he did not appear on MLW television again.

=== WWE (2019–2022) ===
On March 11, 2019, WWE announced the signing of Hathaway, revealing that he was already at the Performance Center. He started as the manager to Babatunde under the name of Court Moore, he later changed his name to Malcolm Bivens and began to manage wrestlers like Jermaine Haley. At the May 16 NXT house show, Hathaway started going by the new name and managed the team Rinku Singh and Saurav Gurjar. He began to work on NXT's weekly show as the villainous manager of Singh and Gurjar as Bivens Enterprises, but the storyline was dropped and Bivens was taken off of television. He returned in December, managing Tyler Rust. On the June 22, 2021, episode of NXT, Bivens and Rust were revealed to be a part of the Diamond Mine stable along with Hachiman and Roderick Strong. Hathaway was released by WWE on April 29, 2022. He had reportedly turned down a contract renewal offer prior to his release.

=== All Elite Wrestling / Return to ROH (2022–present) ===
==== The Firm (2022–2023) ====
Stokely Hathaway made his debut in All Elite Wrestling (AEW) at Double or Nothing. He appeared at the end of a match between TBS Champion Jade Cargill and Anna Jay, aligning himself with Cargill and establishing himself as a heel. In the lead up to All Out 2022, Hathaway started courting wrestlers such as Ethan Page, Lee Moriarty, Colten Gunn, Austin Gunn, and Big Bill to be his new clients. Hathaway and his clients then attacked the Casino Ladder match, taking out every competitor in the ring, clearing the way for the just-entering and masked Joker. At the end of the PPV's main event, the Joker revealed himself to be Maxwell Jacob Friedman, reuniting the latter. On the September 14 episode of AEW Dynamite, Hathaway revealed the name of his group to be "The Firm" and that they were MJF's "retainer team" helping him whenever he would need them. The partnership was short-lived when, on the October 26 episode, MJF would fire Hathaway for disobeying his orders not to attack AEW World Champion Jon Moxley and the Firm would subsequently turn on him.

Hathaway would simultaneously enter a long-term feud with Matt Hardy. On the October 12 episode of Dynamite, Hathaway revealed he bought Private Party’s contracts from LFI. During this segment, a challenge was made for AEW Rampage for a match between Ethan Page and Isiah Kassidy to free Private Party from The Firm's control. But if Page won, The Firm would acquire Matt Hardy's contract as well. On the October 14 episode of Rampage, Page won the match which Hardy and Private Party would have to join The Firm. Hardy and Kassidy would team with The Firm over several months, unsuccessfully challenging the likes of The Elite for the AEW World Trios Championship and JungleHOOK, the latter of which resulted in Hathaway having his first singles match in AEW against Hook in a No Disqualification match after Hardy failed to beat him for the FTW Championship, which Hathaway would lose.

On April 12, 2023 episode of Dynamite, Hardy and Kassidy were turned on by The Firm but were later saved by Hook and a returning Jeff Hardy. This would lead to the Firm Deletion match at the Hardy Compound, where the Hardy Boyz, Kassidy and Hook would defeat Hathaway, Page, Moriarty, and Bill, with Maxel Hardy hitting a Swanton Bomb on Hathaway. This would effectively disband The Firm, with the Gunns allying with Jay White and Juice Robinson of Bullet Club Gold and Hathaway being named to the Board of Directors of Ring of Honor alongside Jerry Lynn.

==== Managing Kris Statlander (2024–2025) ====
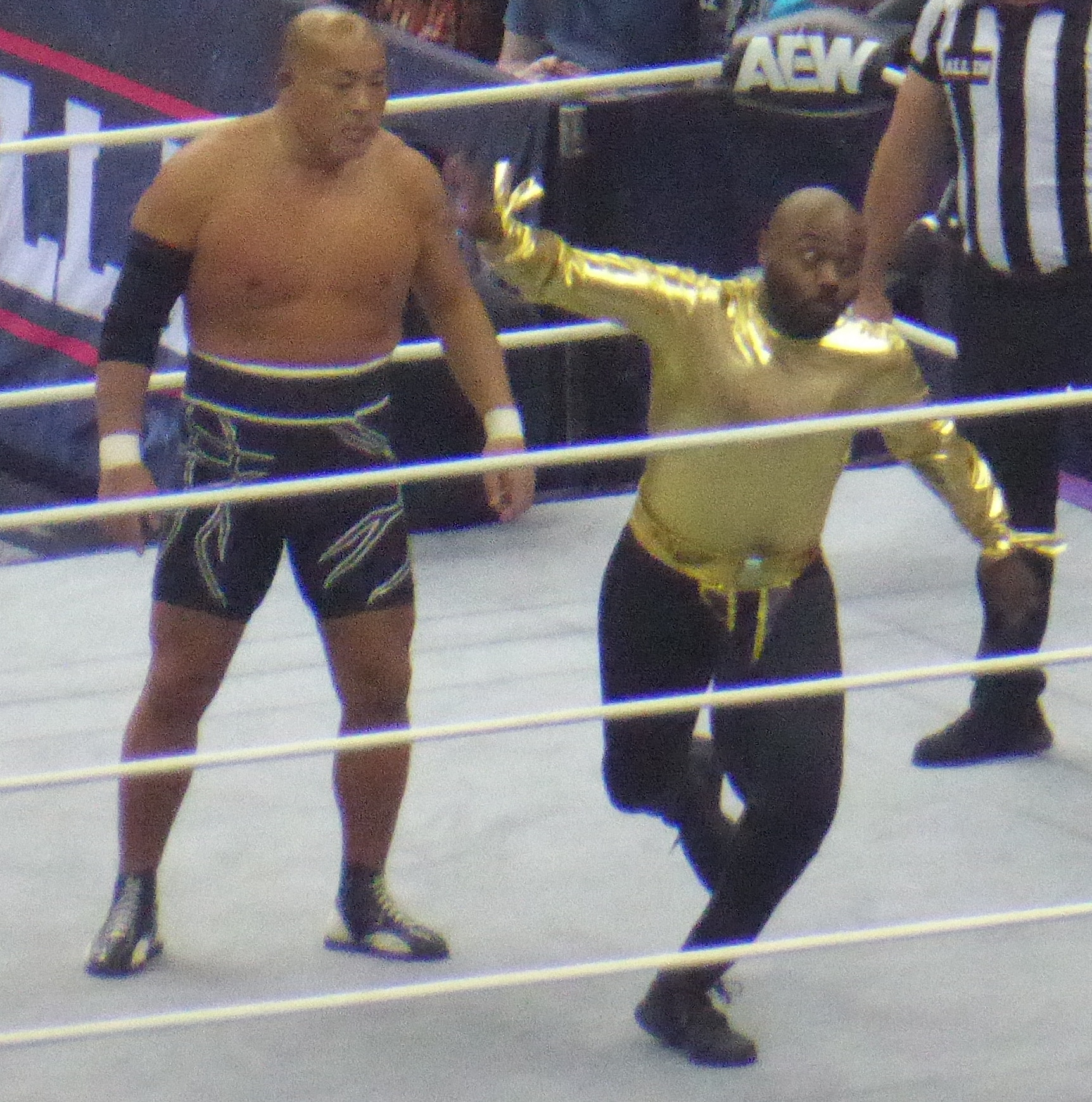
Hathaway (right) wrestling Tomohiro Ishii at All In in August 2024

After spending the summer of 2023 as one of ROH's authority figures, Hathaway returned to a managing position in early 2024, winning the grudging acceptance of Kris Statlander and Willow Nightingale after a campaign to "Give Stokely a Chance" that featured Cameo messages from Kurt Angle and George Santos. The partnership solidified by Revolution, with a win over Skye Blue and Julia Hart at Zero Hour, and a post-match declaration that they were "family", turning Hathaway face in the process. On May 26 at Double or Nothing after Nightingale was defeated by Mercedes Moné, Hathaway berated Nightingale until Statlander pushed him over, seemingly terminating his role as their manager. Moments later on the ramp, Statlander attacked Nightingale and aligned herself with Hathaway once again, revealing the prior events to be a ruse. As a result of the attack, Hathaway once again turned heel. At All In in August 2024, Nightingale and Tomohiro Ishii defeated Hathaway and Statlander in a mixed tag team match. After Statlander defeated Nightingale at All Out, Hathaway and Statlander parted ways with the kayfabe reason for the split being Statlander had invoiced Hathaway a large sum of money to make up for physical therapy, emotional damages and losing her shot at the CMLL World Women's Championship, though this was never acknowledged on AEW programming. After splitting from Statlander, Hathaway was taken off television for unknown reasons.

==== Managing FTR and Kasper Brothers (2025–present) ====
On the April 23, 2025 episode of Dynamite, Hathaway returned as the new manager for FTR and shortened his ring name to Stokely. Under Stokely's managership, FTR defeated Brodido at Full Gear on November 22 to win their record-tying third AEW World Tag Team Championships. With Stokley's assistance, FTR would retain their titles against teams such as Austin Gunn and Juice Robinson of the Bang Bang Gang, The Young Bucks, and Adam Copeland and Christian Cage, before FTR's 183 day reign came to an end at Double or Nothing on May 24, 2026 to Cage and Copeland in an "I Quit" match. In November 2026, Stokely reunited with the Kasper Brothers (formerly the Creed Brothers in WWE) and began managing them alongside FTR.

== Championships and accomplishments ==
- Alpha-1 Wrestling
  - A1 Outer Limits Championship (1 time)
