= Creed Brothers =

Professional wrestling tag team

Tag team
- Names: Los Americanos Hermanos; Creed Brothers; Kasper Brothers
- Members: Bruto Credo / Brutus Creed / Drew Kasper; Jacob Kasper / Julio Credo / Julius Creed
- Manager: Stokely
- Billed heights: Drew Kasper: 5 ft 11 in (1.80 m); Jacob Kasper: 6 ft 3 in (1.91 m)
- Combined billed weight: 495 lb (225 kg) (Drew Kasper: 260 lb (120 kg), Jacob Kasper: 235 lb (107 kg))
- Billed from: Lexington, Ohio, U.S.; Ohio Valley
- Debut: August 24, 2021
- Years active: 2021–present
- Trained by: WWE Performance Center

The Kasper Brothers are a professional wrestling tag team, consisting of brothers Jacob Kasper (born October 3, 1994) and Drew Kasper (born May 13, 1996). They are signed to All Elite Wrestling (AEW), where they perform under their real names, with Stokely as their manager. They are best known for their time in WWE as the Creed Brothers, where they performed under the ring names Julius Creed and Brutus Creed, respectively. During their time in WWE, they became one-time NXT Tag Team Champions and were members of the Diamond Mine and American Made stables. They also appeared in WWE's sister promotion Lucha Libre AAA Worldwide (AAA) as Los Americanos Hermanos, where they performed under the ring names Julio Credo and Bruto Credo, respectively.

== Early lives and amateur wrestling ==
Jacob Kasper was born on October 3, 1994, and Drew Kasper was born on May 13, 1996, in Lexington, Ohio. They attended Lexington High School, where they both competed in amateur wrestling.

Jacob attended Duke University in Durham, North Carolina, where he studied sociology, graduating in 2018. During his time at Duke University, he participated in collegiate wrestling for the Duke Blue Devils and was diagnosed with Crohn's disease. He was a two-time National Collegiate Athletic Association (NCAA) All-American and a three-time NCAA Academic All-American, and won the 2018 Atlantic Coast Conference heavyweight championship. He set a Blue Devils record for the most wins in a single season and ranked second for overall career wins. He participated in the 2016 Olympic trials in the Greco-Roman wrestling and freestyle wrestling categories, placing fifth. In 2017, he trained with mixed martial artist Daniel Cormier to help Cormier prepare for his bout with Jon Jones at UFC 214. In 2018, he began working for Duke University as an assistant wrestling coach.

Drew attended Otterbein University in Westerville, Ohio, where he majored in exercise science, graduating in 2020. During his time at Otterbein University he competed in collegiate wrestling for the Otterbein Cardinals, with an overall record of 108–13. He was a two-time NCAA Division III All-American. In his final year, he had a perfect 30–0 record and was ranked number one in the United States, but did not compete in the 2020 NCAA championships due to their cancellation as a result of the COVID-19 pandemic.

== Professional wrestling career ==
=== WWE (2020–2026) ===
==== Training (2020–2021) ====
In October 2020, Jacob Kasper signed a contract with WWE after being scouted by Gerald Brisco at the 2018 NCAA Division I Wrestling Championships and attending a try-out that June. In February 2021, Drew Kasper signed a contract with WWE after attending a try-out at his brother's urging. Both men were assigned to the WWE Performance Center in Orlando, Florida for training.

==== Diamond Mine (2021–2023) ====
In June 2021, Jacob and Drew were respectively renamed Julius Creed and Brutus Creed. In August, the Creed Brothers debuted on NXT as members of Diamond Mine. On February 15, 2022, at NXT Vengeance Day, they defeated MSK to win the Men's Dusty Rhodes Tag Team Classic. On June 4 at NXT In Your House, they defeated Pretty Deadly to win the NXT Tag Team Championship. They lost the titles to Pretty Deadly at Worlds Collide on September 4, after fellow Diamond Mine member Damon Kemp turned on them during the match.

In July 2023, the Creed Brothers lost a "Loser Leaves NXT" match to The Dyad, but were reinstated the following month after defeating them in a cage match on August 29. On October 31 at Halloween Havoc, they defeated Angel Garza and Humberto Carrillo in a "Tables, Ladders, and Scares match".

The Creed Brothers, alongside fellow Diamond Mine member Ivy Nile, made their main roster debut on the October 30, 2023 episode of WWE Raw, defeating Alpha Academy. On November 27, they won a tag team turmoil match to earn a shot at the Undisputed WWE Tag Team Championship, but failed to win the titles from The Judgment Day on December 18.

==== American Made; departure (2024–2026) ====
In July 2024, the Creed Brothers aligned themselves with Chad Gable, assisting him in attacking Bo Dallas. The group was subsequently named American Made, with Ivy Nile later joining. On May 2, 2026, the Creed Brothers appeared at a Lucha Libre AAA Worldwide event, attacking El Grande Americano and aligning themselves with "The Original" El Grande Americano. On May 4, they appeared on Raw as Los Americanos Hermanos, joining "The Original" El Grande Americano in a trios match against Los Americanos. American Made subsequently disbanded after Gable revealed himself as "The Original" El Grande Americano following his loss to El Grande Americano in a mask versus mask match at Noche de Los Grandes on May 30, 2026.

On September 1, 2026, the Creed Brothers returned to NXT and attacked several wrestlers. They wrestled their final WWE match on October 20, losing to Hank and Tank in the quarterfinals of the 2026 Dusty Rhodes Tag Team Classic. On November 6, it was reported that their WWE contracts had expired and they had elected not to renew, ending their six-year tenure with the promotion.

=== All Elite Wrestling (2026–present) ===
On November 14, 2026 at Full Gear, the Kasper Brothers made their All Elite Wrestling (AEW) debut under their real names, where they aligned themselves with FTR to attack Motor City Machine Guns and the reigning AEW World Tag Team Champions The Young Bucks. They also reunited with their former manager Stokely (formerly Malcom Bivens in WWE) who was managing FTR. They made their in-ring debut on the following episode of AEW Dynamite with Stokley in their corner, where they defeated enhancement talent in a squash match.

== Professional wrestling style and persona ==
The Kasper Brothers wrestle in a power-based style incorporating "slams, suplexes and collisions". Their finishing moves include a clothesline/sliding lariat. Their style has drawn comparisons to both the Road Warriors and the Steiner Brothers. Reflecting their amateur wrestling backgrounds, the Kasper Brothers perform wearing wrestling singlets and wrestling shoes. Drew Kasper was described by WWE in 2021 as possessing "unbridled strength and a ruthless nature", while Jacob Kasper was described by WWE as possessing "uncontrollable aggression and an absolute sadistic nature".

== Other media ==
The Kasper Brothers (as the Creed Brothers) made their video game debut as playable characters in WWE 2K23 and also appeared in WWE 2K24, WWE 2K25, and WWE 2K26.

== Championships and accomplishments ==
=== Amateur wrestling ===
- Drew Kasper
  - NCAA Division III All-American (2 times)
- Jacob Kasper
  - ACC Heavyweight Championship (2018)
  - NCAA Division I All-American (2 times)
  - NCAA Division I Academic All-American (3 times)
  - Southern Scuffle Heavyweight Division winner (2017, 2018)

=== Professional wrestling ===
- WWE
  - NXT Tag Team Championship (1 time)
  - Men's Dusty Rhodes Tag Team Classic (2022)
  - NXT Year-End Award
    - Tag Team of the Year (2023)
