= United States Olympic trials (wrestling) =

International wrestling event

United States Olympic team trials
- Status: active
- Genre: sports event
- Date: April–June
- Frequency: quadrennial
- Location: various
- Country: United States
- Years active: 1984–present
- Inaugurated: 1984
- Organiser: USA Wrestling

The United States Olympic team trials for the sport of wrestling are contested quadrennially to determine the country's representative at the Summer Olympic Games on each style (men's and women's freestyle and Greco-Roman) and weight class. The event is conducted by the national governing body of the sport, currently USA Wrestling.

== Standards ==
To represent the United States at the Summer Olympic Games, an American wrestler must qualify nationally by winning the US Olympic team trials tournament, and internationally, by either placing fifth or higher at the previous year's World Championships or by becoming a finalist at the Pan American Olympic Qualifier or at a World Olympic Qualifier. The athlete who qualifies their weight class for the Summer Olympics is not guaranteed of a spot in the team, as he must qualify nationally. In case of an athlete qualifying nationally but failing to qualify the weight class internationally, the United States will not be represented at the Games.

== History ==
The first edition of the US Olympic team trials for wrestling took place from June 16 to 23 of 1984, when USA Wrestling dictated they would no longer select the wrestlers they sent to the Summer Olympic Games or the World Championships, as they would now hold an event where qualifying would now be on the hands of the athletes. Bob Dellinger, tournament operations director for the organization, expressed:

"We have brought these ladder challenges the actual final trials for the Olympic team out of a training camp situation and have placed them before the public. Many times in the past, the qualifying tournaments were sold to the public as "final trials,' when in reality the team was selected in the seclusion of a training camp. These are not selections, they are trials. The decisions will be made on the mat, by athletes who have been training hard for a year or more for this opportunity. Our fans deserve the right to watch the Olympic team take shape."

== Editions ==
Year	Location	Venue	Dates	Ref.
2024	State College, Pennsylvania	Bryce Jordan Center	April 19–20, 2024	
2020	Fort Worth, Texas	Dickies Arena	April 2–3, 2021	
2016	Iowa City, Iowa	Carver-Hawkeye Arena	April 8–10, 2016	
2012	Iowa City, Iowa	Carver-Hawkeye Arena	April 21–22, 2012	
2008	Las Vegas, Nevada	Thomas & Mack Center	June 14–16, 2008	
2004	Indianapolis, Indiana	RCA Dome	May 21–23, 2004	
2000	Dallas, Texas	Reunion Arena	June 22–24, 2000	
1996	Spokane, Washington	Spokane Arena	June 7–9, 1996	
1992	Pittsburgh, Pennsylvania		June 6, 1992	
1988	Pensacola, Florida	Pensacola Civic Center	June 17, 1988	
1984	Allendale, Michigan	Grand Valley State University	June 16–23, 1984	
