= NXT UK TakeOver: Blackpool II =

2020 WWE Network event

- Promotional poster featuring Toni Storm, Kay Lee Ray, Piper Niven, Walter, and Joe Coffey
- Promotion: WWE
- Brand: NXT UK
- Date: 12 January 2020
- City: Blackpool, Lancashire, England
- Venue: Empress Ballroom

WWE event chronology
← Previous; TLC: Tables, Ladders & Chairs	Next → Worlds Collide

NXT UK TakeOver chronology
← Previous; Cardiff	Next → Final

NXT UK TakeOver: Blackpool chronology
← Previous; I	Next → Final

WWE in Europe chronology
← Previous; NXT UK TakeOver: Cardiff	Next → Clash at the Castle

NXT UK TakeOver: Blackpool II was a 2020 professional wrestling livestreaming event produced by the American promotion WWE, held exclusively for wrestlers from the promotion's United Kingdom-based developmental brand, NXT UK. It was the third and final NXT UK TakeOver event, the second annual and final TakeOver: Blackpool, and the final livestreaming event produced exclusively for NXT UK. The event took place on Sunday, January 12, 2020, at the Empress Ballroom in Blackpool, Lancashire, England, the same venue as the first TakeOver: Blackpool. It aired exclusively on the WWE Network at 5:00 p.m. Greenwich Mean Time (12:00 p.m. Eastern Time) and was the first and only NXT UK TakeOver to be held on a Sunday.

Five matches were contested at the event. In the main event, Walter defeated Joe Coffey by submission to retain the WWE United Kingdom Championship. In other matches, Gallus (Mark Coffey and Wolfgang) defeated Imperium (Fabian Aichner and Marcel Barthel), Grizzled Young Veterans (Zack Gibson and James Drake), and Mark Andrews and Flash Morgan Webster in a four-way tag team ladder match to retain the NXT UK Tag Team Championship, and Kay Lee Ray retained the NXT UK Women's Championship by defeating Toni Storm and Piper Niven in a triple threat match.

Due to the COVID-19 pandemic that began in March 2020, the next scheduled NXT UK TakeOver event, TakeOver: Dublin, was ultimately canceled and although WWE resumed live touring in July 2021 after COVID travel restrictions were loosened, no further NXT UK TakeOver events were scheduled. The NXT UK brand itself was dissolved in September 2022 for an eventual relaunch as NXT Europe.

== Production ==
=== Background ===
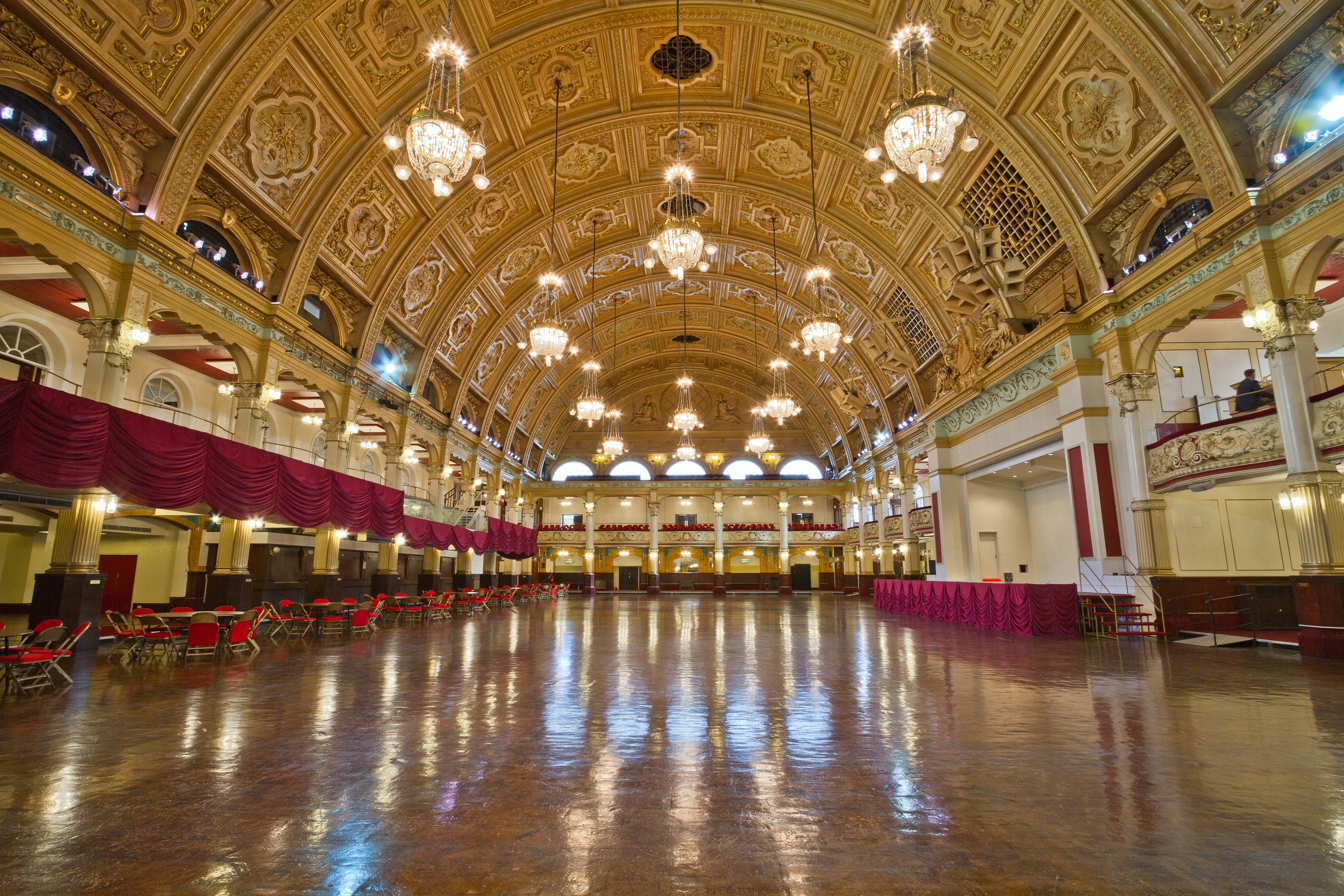
The third NXT UK TakeOver event, and second annual TakeOver: Blackpool, was held at the Empress Ballroom in Blackpool, Lancashire, England, the same venue as the first TakeOver: Blackpool.

Since May 2014, the American professional wrestling company WWE had produced a series of livestreaming events titled TakeOver for its NXT brand, which were held periodically throughout the year and aired exclusively on the WWE Network. After the United Kingdom-based NXT UK formally debuted in June 2018, the brand held its first major livestreaming event as TakeOver: Blackpool in January 2019, adopting the "TakeOver" name for its major periodic events that were also livestreamed exclusively on the WWE Network. Announced on November 16, 2019, a second TakeOver: Blackpool, titled Blackpool II, was scheduled to be held on Sunday, January 12, 2020, at the same venue as the first event, the Empress Ballroom in Blackpool, Lancashire, England. It was the third NXT UK TakeOver event, and the first to be held on a Sunday, and it aired at 5:00 p.m. Greenwich Mean Time (12:00 p.m. Eastern Time). Tickets went on sale on November 18, 2019.

=== Storylines ===
The card included five matches that resulted from scripted storylines. Results were predetermined by WWE's writers on the NXT UK brand, while storylines were produced on WWE's weekly television programme, NXT UK.

On the November 7, 2019, episode of NXT UK, Mark Andrews and Flash Morgan Webster's match ended in a no contest after Gallus (Mark Coffey and Wolfgang) and Imperium (Fabian Aichner and Marcel Barthel) interfered. On the December 12 episode, Gallus's tag title match against Imperium ended in a no contest after Andrews, Webster, and Grizzled Young Veterans (James Drake and Zack Gibson) brawled. Then, Johnny Saint and Sid Scala came out and announced that Gallus would defend the NXT UK Tag Team Championship against Andrews and Webster, Grizzled Young Veterans, and Imperium at TakeOver: Blackpool II in a ladder match.

On the November 28, 2019, episode of NXT UK, after Piper Niven's match against Jinny, Toni Storm returned and attacked Kay Lee Ray. Then on the December 5 episode, after Storm's match with Killer Kelly, Ray attacked Storm and Niven came out and helped but Storm, however, said that she did not need Niven's help. On the December 12 episode, after Kay Lee Ray's match with Isla Dawn, Ray grabbed the mic and talked trash about Storm and Niven only for them to come out and Ray attacked both. As Ray was leaving, Sid Scala announced that Ray would defend the NXT UK Women's Championship against Storm and Niven in a triple threat match at TakeOver: Blackpool II.

== Event ==
Other on-screen personnel
Role:	Name:
Commentators	Tom Phillips
Commentators	Nigel McGuinness
Ring announcer	Andy Shepherd
Referees	Joel Allen
Referees	Chris Sharpe
Referees	Chris Roberts
Referees	Tom Scarborough
Interviewer	Radzi Chinyanganya
Pre-show panel	Andy Shepherd
Pre-show panel	Tom Phillips
Pre-show panel	William Regal

=== Preliminary matches ===
In the opening bout, Trent Seven faced Eddie Dennis. Dennis performed a Neck Stop Driver on Seven to win.

Next, Kay Lee Ray defended the NXT UK Women's Championship against Toni Storm and Piper Niven. Storm performed a Frog Splash on Niven but Ray performed a Superkick on Storm. Ray pinned Niven to retain the title.

After that, Tyler Bate faced Jordan Devlin. Bate performed a Corkscrew Senton Bomb on Devlin to win.

Later, Gallus (Mark Coffey and Wolfgang) defended the NXT UK Tag Team Championship against Grizzled Young Veterans (Zack Gibson and James Drake), Mark Andrews and Flash Morgan Webster and Imperium (Fabian Aichner and Marcel Barthel) in a Ladder match. Coffey and Wolfgang retrieved the belts to retain the titles.

=== Main event ===
In the main event, Walter defended the WWE United Kingdom Championship against Joe Coffey. Walter performed a Running Front Dropkick on the referee. Coffey performed a Powerbomb on Walter. Alexander Wolfe interfered and performed a Bicycle Kick on Coffey. Ilja Dragunov appeared and performed Torpedo Moscow on Wolfe. Walter performed a Clothesline on Dragunov. Walter threw Coffey into the steel steps and performed a Powerbomb onto the ring apron on Coffey. Walter performed a Short-Arm Clothesline on Coffey for a near-fall. Walter performed a Diving Splash on Coffey for a near-fall. Coffey performed a Discus Clothesline on Walter for a near-fall. Walter performed a Sleeper Suplex and two Powerbombs on Coffey. Walter forced Coffey to submit to a Side Headlock to retain the title.

After the match, The Undisputed Era attacked Imperium. Roderick Strong performed a Jumping High Knee on Walter and Adam Cole performed a Superkick on Walter. Bobby Fish and Kyle O'Reilly performed Total Elimination on Walter. Cole performed a Last Shot on Walter.

== Aftermath ==
Following the event, the WWE United Kingdom Championship was renamed as the NXT United Kingdom Championship.

TakeOver: Blackpool II would be the final NXT UK TakeOver event. Another event, TakeOver: Dublin, had been planned, but was ultimately cancelled due to the COVID-19 pandemic. The main NXT's TakeOver series was also discontinued in late 2021. Also, in September 2022, NXT UK went on hiatus with an eventual planned relaunch as NXT Europe, in turn making this the final livestreaming event produced exclusively for NXT UK.

== Results ==
No.	Results	Stipulations	Times
1^{UK}	Joseph Conners defeated A-Kid by pinfall	Singles match	10:17
2^{UK}	Dave Mastiff defeated Kassius Ohno by pinfall	Singles match	6:49
3	Eddie Dennis defeated Trent Seven by pinfall	Singles match	8:20
4	Kay Lee Ray (c) defeated Toni Storm and Piper Niven by pinfall	Triple threat match for the NXT UK Women's Championship	13:10
5	Tyler Bate defeated Jordan Devlin by pinfall	Singles match	22:22
6	Gallus (Mark Coffey and Wolfgang) (c) defeated Imperium (Fabian Aichner and Marcel Barthel), Grizzled Young Veterans (Zack Gibson and James Drake), and Mark Andrews and Flash Morgan Webster	Fatal four-way tag team ladder match for the NXT UK Tag Team Championship	25:00
7	Walter (c) defeated Joe Coffey by submission	Singles match for the WWE United Kingdom Championship	27:31
(c) / – the champion(s) heading into the match; UK / – the match was taped for a future broadcast of NXT UK
