= NXT UK TakeOver =

WWE Network event series

- NXT UK TakeOver logo
- Promotions: WWE
- Brands: NXT UK
- First event: Blackpool (January 2019)
- Last event: Blackpool II (January 2020)

NXT UK TakeOver was a series of periodic professional wrestling events produced by the American promotion WWE, exclusively for its former United Kingdom-based brand, NXT UK. Established in 2019, the UK TakeOver events served as the brand's counterpart to the main NXT brand's TakeOver shows, and were livestreamed exclusively on the WWE Network.

Only three NXT UK TakeOver events were produced: Blackpool and Cardiff in January and August 2019, respectively, and Blackpool II in January 2020. A fourth, Dublin, was planned for April 2020, but due to the COVID-19 pandemic that began in March, it was ultimately canceled and no further UK TakeOvers were scheduled. In late 2021, the main NXT's TakeOver series was discontinued after NXT went through a restructuring. The NXT UK brand was then dissolved in September 2022 for an eventual relaunch as NXT Europe.

== History ==
In December 2016, the American professional wrestling promotion WWE announced plans for a United Kingdom-based brand. The first live specials held in the country were then the United Kingdom Championship Tournament and United Kingdom Championship Special in 2017, followed by a second United Kingdom Championship Tournament in 2018. These events aired exclusively on the WWE Network. Soon after the establishment of the NXT UK brand in June 2018 followed by its own television program in October, the brand began livestreaming its own "TakeOver" events on the WWE Network—TakeOver was the name for the main NXT's periodic live specials. The first NXT UK TakeOver was Blackpool in January 2019. It was followed by Cardiff in August and then Blackpool II in January 2020.

Only one NXT UK TakeOver event had to be cancelled. Dublin was originally set to air live from the 3Arena in Dublin, Ireland on 26 April 2020 and would have been the first TakeOver held outside the United Kingdom. The event was initially rescheduled to 25 October 2020 due to the COVID-19 pandemic, which began affecting all of WWE's programming in mid-March that year. However, due to the ongoing pandemic, the event was once again rescheduled, this time to 20 June 2021. On 30 April, however, WWE confirmed that the event had been cancelled.

No further NXT UK TakeOver events were scheduled following the cancellation of Dublin. The main NXT's TakeOver series was also discontinued in late 2021. NXT UK was then dissolved in September 2022 for an eventual relaunch as NXT Europe.

== Events ==
#	Event	Date	Venue	Location	Main event	Ref.
1	Blackpool	12 January 2019	Empress Ballroom	Blackpool, Lancashire, England	Pete Dunne (c) vs. Joe Coffey for the WWE United Kingdom Championship	
2	Cardiff	31 August 2019	Motorpoint Arena Cardiff	Cardiff, South Glamorgan, Wales	Walter (c) vs. Tyler Bate for the WWE United Kingdom Championship	
3	Blackpool II	12 January 2020	Empress Ballroom	Blackpool, Lancashire, England	Walter (c) vs. Joe Coffey for the WWE United Kingdom Championship	
(c) – refers to the champion(s) heading into the match

== See also ==
- List of WWE pay-per-view and livestreaming supercards
