= NXT UK TakeOver: Cardiff =

2019 WWE Network event

- Promotional poster featuring Walter, Tyler Bate, Toni Storm, and Kay Lee Ray
- Promotion: WWE
- Brand: NXT UK
- Date: 31 August 2019
- City: Cardiff, Wales
- Venue: Motorpoint Arena Cardiff
- Attendance: 3,600

WWE event chronology
| ← Previous; SummerSlam | Next → Clash of Champions |

NXT UK TakeOver chronology
| ← Previous; Blackpool | Next → Blackpool II |

WWE in Europe chronology
| ← Previous; NXT UK TakeOver: Blackpool | Next → NXT UK TakeOver: Blackpool II |

NXT UK TakeOver: Cardiff was a 2019 professional wrestling livestreaming event produced by the American company WWE, held for wrestlers from the promotion's United Kingdom-based developmental brand, NXT UK. It was the second NXT UK TakeOver event and took place on Saturday, August 31, 2019, at the Motorpoint Arena Cardiff in Cardiff, Wales. The event aired exclusively on the WWE Network at 7:00 p.m. British Summer Time (2:00 p.m. Eastern Time).

Six matches were contested at the event. In the main event, Walter retained the WWE United Kingdom Championship against Tyler Bate. Other matches included Mark Andrews and Flash Morgan Webster defeating defending champions Zack Gibson and James Drake and Gallus (Mark Coffey and Wolfgang) in a triple threat tag team match to win the NXT UK Tag Team Championship, and Kay Lee Ray defeated Toni Storm to win the NXT UK Women's Championship.

== Production ==
=== Background ===
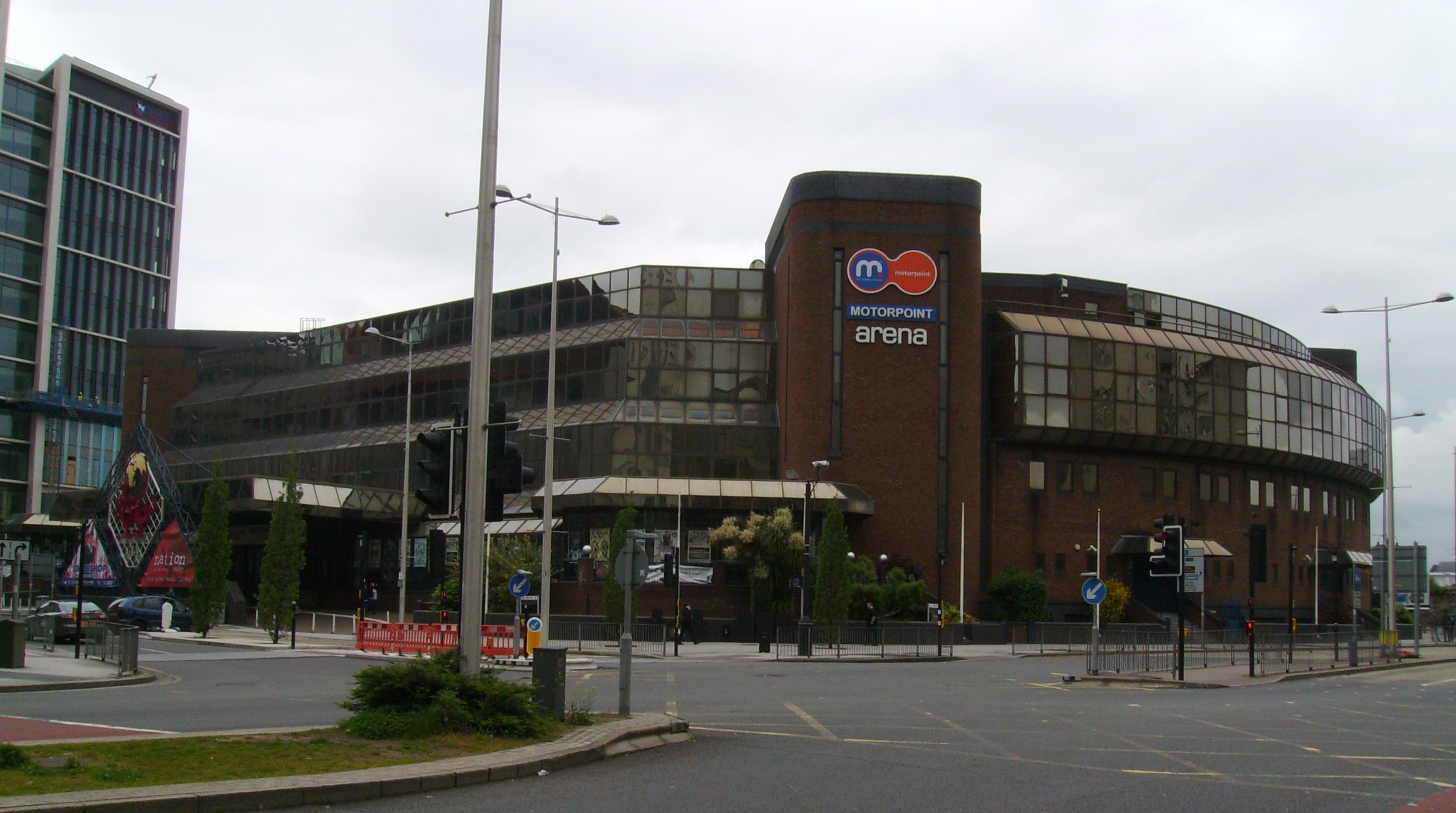
The second NXT UK TakeOver event was held at the Motorpoint Arena Cardiff in Cardiff, Wales.

Since May 2014, the American professional wrestling company WWE had produced a series of livestreaming events titled TakeOver for its developmental brand, NXT, which were held periodically throughout the year and aired exclusively on the WWE Network. After the United Kingdom-based NXT UK formally debuted in June 2018, the brand held its first major livestreaming event as TakeOver: Blackpool in January 2019, adopting the "TakeOver" name for its major periodic events that were also livestreamed exclusively on the WWE Network. Announced on June 1, 2019, the second NXT UK TakeOver event, titled TakeOver: Cardiff, was scheduled to be held on Saturday, August 31, 2019, at the Motorpoint Arena Cardiff and was named after the venue's city of Cardiff, Wales. It aired at 7:00 p.m. British Summer Time (2:00 p.m. Eastern Time).

=== Storylines ===
The card included six matches that resulted from scripted storylines. Results were predetermined by WWE's writers on the NXT UK brand, while storylines were produced on WWE's weekly television programme, NXT UK.

On the June 19 episode of NXT UK, Kay Lee Ray won a battle royal for an opportunity to face Toni Storm for the NXT UK Women's Championship at a time of her choosing by last eliminating Xia Brookside. On the July 17 episode, Ray interrupted Storm and announced that their title match would take place at TakeOver: Cardiff.

On the July 3 episode of NXT UK during Moustache Mountain's (Trent Seven and Tyler Bate) match, Imperium (Walter, Fabian Aichner, and Marcel Barthel) interfered, attacking and injuring Bate. On the July 31 episode, Bate returned and attacked Imperium with Walter scheduled to defend the WWE United Kingdom Championship against Bate at TakeOver: Cardiff.

On the August 7 episode of NXT UK, Gallus (Mark Coffey and Wolfgang) and the team of Mark Andrews and Flash Morgan Webster wanted to face James Drake and Zack Gibson for the NXT UK Tag Team Championship. Later in that episode, Andrews and Morgan had to prove themselves in order to make the match a triple threat tag team match at TakeOver: Cardiff. Webster defeated Coffey on the August 14 episode while Andrews defeated Drake on the August 21 episode, making it a triple threat tag team match at TakeOver: Cardiff.

== Event ==
Other on-screen personnel
| Role: | Name: |
|---|---|
| Commentators | Vic Joseph |
| Commentators | Nigel McGuinness |
| Ring announcer | Andy Shepherd |
| Referees | Joel Allen |
| Referees | Chris Roberts |
| Referees | Chris Sharpe |
| Referees | Tom Scarborough |
| Interviewer | Radzi Chinyanganya |

=== Preliminary matches ===
The event opened with Noam Dar facing Travis Banks. Dar performed a Nova Roller on Banks to win the match.

Next, Cesaro faced Ilja Dragunov. Cesaro performed a Pop Up European Uppercut and a Neutralizer on Dragunov to win the match.

After that, The Grizzled Young Veterans (Zack Gibson and James Drake) defended the NXT UK Tag Team Championship against Gallus (Mark Coffey and Wolfgang) and Mark Andrews and Flash Morgan Webster. Andrews performed a Shooting Star Press on Gibson and Webster pinned Gibson to win the titles.

Later, Joe Coffey faced Dave Mastiff in a Last Man Standing match. In the end, Coffey and Mastiff fell off a production crate through a table. Mastiff could not stand by a ten count, meaning Coffey won.

In the penultimate match, Toni Storm defended the NXT UK Women's Championship against Kay Lee Ray. Ray performed a Rope-Hung Gory Bomb and a second Gory Bomb on Storm to win the title.

=== Main event ===
In the main event, Walter defended the WWE United Kingdom Championship against Tyler Bate. Walter performed a Powerbomb onto the ring apron and a Powerbomb into the ring post on Bate. Bate performed a Tyler Driver '97 on Walter for a two-count. Bate performed a Corkscrew Senton Bomb on Walter for a two-count. Walter performed a Diving Splash on Bate for a two-count. Walter performed a Folding Powerbomb on Bate for a one-count. Walter performed a Lariat on Bate to retain the title.

== Reception ==
Larry Csonka of 411Mania gave it an 8.5 out of 10, stating "NXT UK TakeOver: Cardiff 2019 was a tremendous success and a vast improvement over their first TakeOver effort. Cesaro came off like a big star, the title changes made sense, there was a ton of quality wrestling and Walter vs. Bate was an instant classic. If you haven't followed the brand, make time to catch this show". Dave Meltzer of the Wrestling Observer Newsletter also gave the event high marks overall and ranked each match as follows: 2.5 stars for Noam Dar vs. Travis Banks, 4 stars for Cesaro vs. Ilja Dragunov, 4.5 stars for the triple threat NXT UK Tag Team Championship match, 2.5 stars for the Last Man Standing Match, 3.25 stars for the NXT UK Women's Championship match and 5.25 stars for the United Kingdom Championship match.

== Results ==
| No. | Results | Stipulations | Times |
|---|---|---|---|
| 1^{UK} | Rhea Ripley defeated Piper Niven by pinfall | Singles match | 8:45 |
| 2^{UK} | Kassius Ohno defeated Sid Scala by pinfall | Singles match | 10:00 |
| 3 | Noam Dar defeated Travis Banks by pinfall | Singles match | 13:56 |
| 4 | Cesaro defeated Ilja Dragunov by pinfall | Singles match | 12:26 |
| 5 | Mark Andrews and Flash Morgan Webster defeated Zack Gibson and James Drake (c) and Gallus (Mark Coffey and Wolfgang) by pinfall | Triple threat tag team match for the NXT UK Tag Team Championship | 20:17 |
| 6 | Joe Coffey defeated Dave Mastiff | Last Man Standing match | 16:03 |
| 7 | Kay Lee Ray defeated Toni Storm (c) by pinfall | Singles match for the NXT UK Women's Championship | 9:52 |
| 8 | Walter (c) defeated Tyler Bate by pinfall | Singles match for the WWE United Kingdom Championship | 41:43 |
(c) / – the champion(s) heading into the match; UK / – the match was taped for a future broadcast of NXT UK
