= Imperium (professional wrestling) =

Professional wrestling stable

Statistics
- Name: Imperium
- Members: Gunther (leader); Ludwig Kaiser; Giovanni Vinci; Alexander Wolfe
- Billed from: Europe
- Debut: 22 May 2019
- Disbanded: 23 December 2024
- Years active: 2019–2024

Imperium was a European professional wrestling stable in WWE which consisted of Gunther from Austria, Ludwig Kaiser and Alexander Wolfe from Germany, and Giovanni Vinci from Italy.

Previously working for several European promotions, including together as part of the stable Ringkampf, Gunther and Kaiser (then known as Walter and Marcel Barthel) signed with WWE in 2019. They debuted on NXT UK and were paired with Vinci (then known as Fabian Aichner) and Wolfe; the group changed its name to Imperium and continued the Ringkampf motto of Die Matte ist heilig (German for "the mat is sacred"). During their time in NXT, Walter became the longest-reigning NXT UK Champion, while Barthel and Aichner became two-time NXT Tag Team Champions.

Wolfe was kicked out in May 2021 and Aichner left in April 2022; later that month, Gunther and Kaiser debuted as a duo on the SmackDown and dropped the Imperium name, with Gunther later becoming the longest-reigning WWE Intercontinental Champion. Imperium reunited as a trio and began using the name again when Vinci rejoined in September 2022, but he was kicked out in April 2024 and the stable quietly dissolved later that year. As of 2026, Gunther and Kaiser are the only former Imperium members employed with WWE.

== Background ==
From 2016 to 2019, Gunther and Ludwig Kaiser (then known as Walter and Axel Dieter Jr.) were members of a stable called Ringkampf alongside Timothy Thatcher and Christian Michael Jakobi, in which they worked on several European promotions. Ringkampf's first match occurred on 23 September 2016 when Axel Dieter Jr. teamed up with Walter and Thatcher to defeat Da Mack, Francis Kaspin and John Klinger in a tag team match at the wXw Shotgun Live Tour in Ludwigshafen. Ringkampf also wrestled for Progress Wrestling. At Chapter 47, Ringkampf (Walter, Dieter and Thatcher) challenged British Strong Style (Pete Dunne, Trent Seven and Tyler Bate) for all of their championships, in a six-man tag team match, but they were unsuccessful. In October 2020, Walter announced he would close Ringkampf since he, Wolfe and Barthel wouldn't work for wXw.

== History ==
=== WWE ===
==== NXT UK and NXT (2019–2022) ====
On 22 May 2019 episode of NXT UK, Walter won a rematch for the United Kingdom Championship against Dunne, after interference by the European Union (Fabian Aichner and Marcel Barthel), thus establishing himself as a heel. They would form a faction under the name Imperium. The faction would later be joined by Alexander Wolfe, after he interfered in a match pitting Imperium against British Strong Style. On the 26 June episode of NXT UK, Walter retained his title against Travis Banks. On 3 July episode of NXT UK, Imperium interfered in Moustache Mountain's title match against Grizzled Young Veterans therefore making Grizzled Young Veterans retain their titles. After the match, they injured Tyler Bate. On 31 August at NXT UK TakeOver: Cardiff, Walter retained his title against Bate.

In the build-up for the NXT UK and NXT co-branded pay-per-view, Worlds Collide, Imperium started a feud with The Undisputed Era (NXT Champion Adam Cole, Roderick Strong, and NXT Tag Team Champions Bobby Fish and Kyle O'Reilly), and during the final moments of NXT UK TakeOver: Blackpool II on 12 January 2020, the group attacked Imperium following Walter's successful title defense against Joe Coffey, thus further intensifying it. The following week, the WWE United Kingdom Championship was renamed to NXT United Kingdom Championship and Walter was presented with a slightly updated belt design, with the WWE logo at the center being replaced with the NXT UK logo. On 13 May 2020, Barthel and Aichner defeated Matt Riddle and Timothy Thatcher (a substitute for Pete Dunne) to win the NXT Tag team Championship after Thatcher walked out on Riddle. The duo lost the titles to Breezango (Fandango & Tyler Breeze) on the 26 August episode of NXT. On the 29 October episode of NXT UK, Walter retained the United Kingdom Championship in a match against Ilja Dragunov.

On 19 February 2021, Walter became the longest-reigning NXT United Kingdom Champion, breaking Pete Dunne's record of 685 days, making Walter the longest-reigning champion in WWE history since 1988. On the 18 May episode of NXT, after Wolfe was defeated by Killian Dain, he was attacked by Aichner and Barthel, thus kicking him out of the faction. This was done to write him off television as Wolfe's WWE contract was due to expire the following June; he was subsequently among the group of NXT talent released from their contracts the following day. At NXT TakeOver 36, Walter dropped the United Kingdom Championship to Dragunov in a rematch ending his historic reign at 870 days. At NXT: Halloween Havoc, Aichner and Berthel regained the NXT Tag Team Championship by defeating MSK. They later lost the titles back to MSK at Stand & Deliver the following year, in a triple threat match that also involved The Creed Brothers. Their final NXT appearance was on the 5 April episode of NXT when Aichner and Barthel faced the Creed brothers in a losing effort, with Aichner walking out of their match, and Gunther facing NXT Champion Bron Breakker in a losing effort.

==== Main roster (2022–2025) ====
On 8 April 2022, Gunther and Barthel (now going by Ludwig Kaiser) debuted on SmackDown for the first time with Gunther defeating Joe Alonzo in his first match; while their association was maintained, the Imperium name was dropped. On the 27 May episode of SmackDown, Gunther and Kaiser made their debut as a tag team against Drew Gulak and Ricochet, with Kaiser pinning Gulak for the win. On the 10 June episode of SmackDown, Gunther defeated Ricochet to win the Intercontinental Championship, making him the first Austrian to win the title. Prior to Gunther's title defense at Clash at the Castle, Kaiser announced the reformation of Imperium by reintroducing Aichner, now known as Giovanni Vinci. Gunther subsequently defeated Sheamus to retain the Intercontinental Championship, and since then Imperium has been involved in a feud with Sheamus' group The Brawling Brutes. At Extreme Rules on 8 October Imperium lost to The Brawling Brutes in a Six Man Tag Team Good Old Fashioned Donnybrook match. In Night 2 of WrestleMania 39, Gunther successfully defended the Intercontinental Championship against Sheamus and Drew McIntyre in a triple threat match. As part of the 2023 WWE Draft, Imperium were drafted to the Raw brand. This marked their return to Raw since their last appearance during NXT's invasion of Raw on 11 November 2019.

Gunther lost the Intercontinental Championship to Sami Zayn at WrestleMania XL on 6 April 2024, ending his reign at a record-setting 666 days. On the 22 April 2024 episode of Raw, after Vinci and Kaiser lost to The New Day, Kaiser attacked Vinci and kicked him out of Imperium; Gunther was not involved and gave no comment. Vinci's expulsion from the group was solidified when he was drafted to SmackDown a week later during the 2024 WWE Draft, and was released from WWE on 8 February 2025. Gunther and Kaiser made their last appearance together backstage on the 23 December 2024 episode of Raw. They then began focusing on singles competition, quietly dissolving the stable with no announcements being made. Gunther retained the group's entrance music and character, while Kaiser was repackaged as a masked luchador named El Grande Americano.

== Members ==
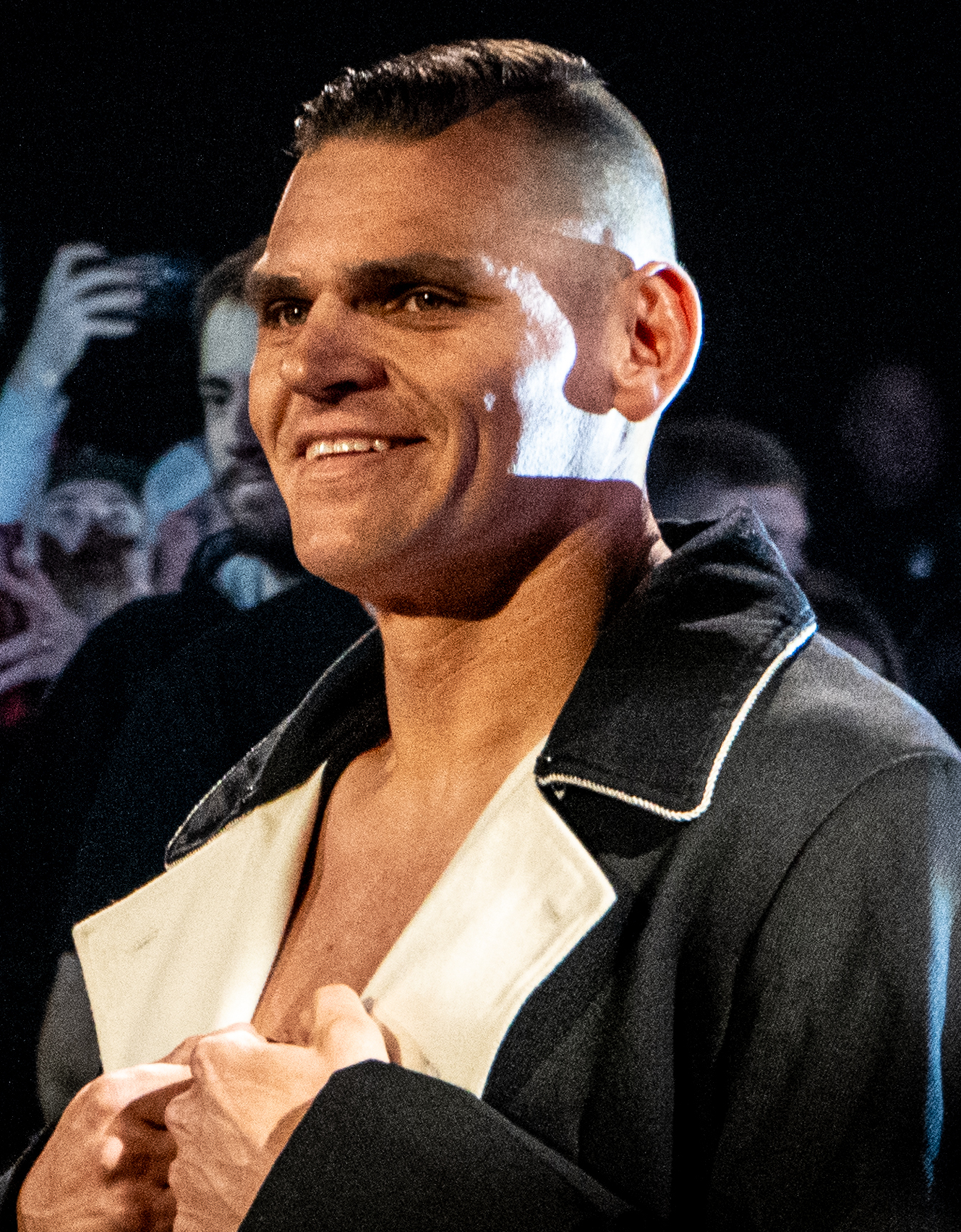
Gunther

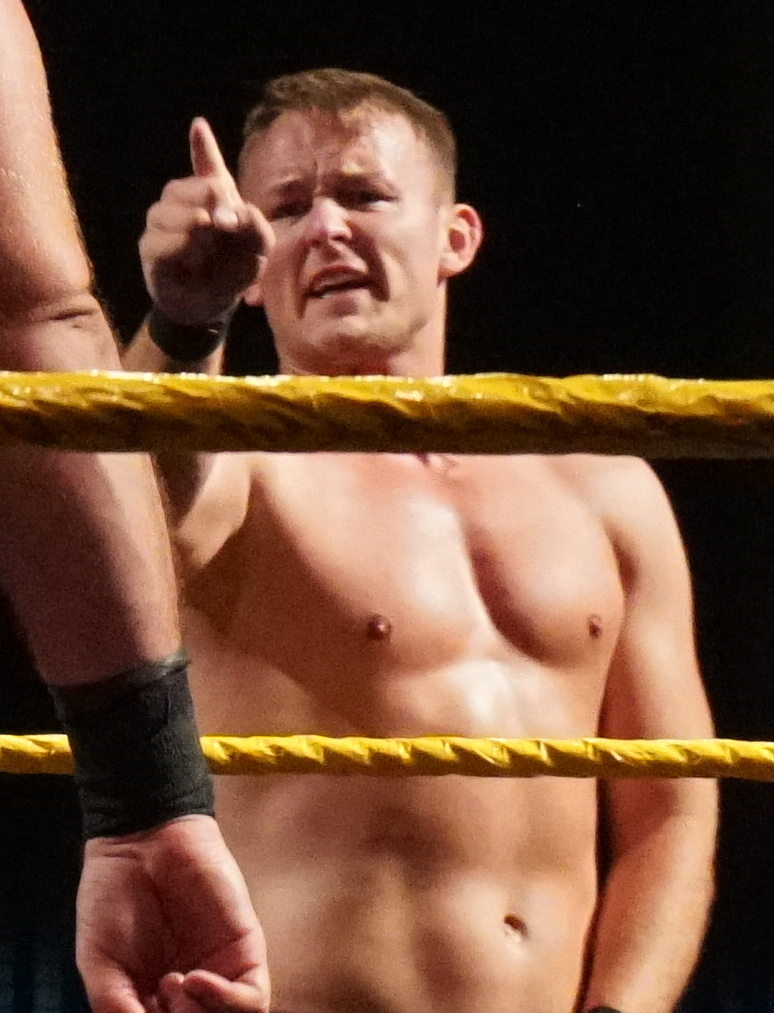
Ludwig Kaiser

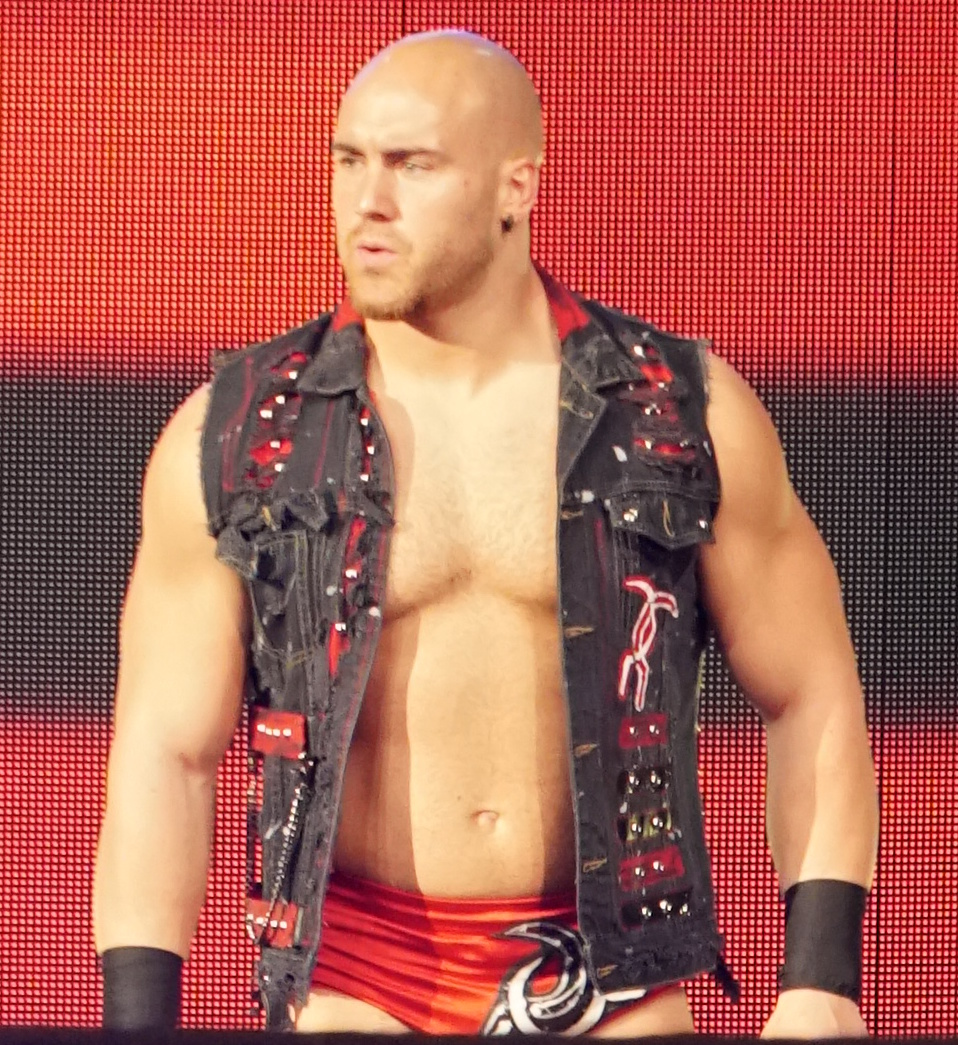
Giovanni Vinci

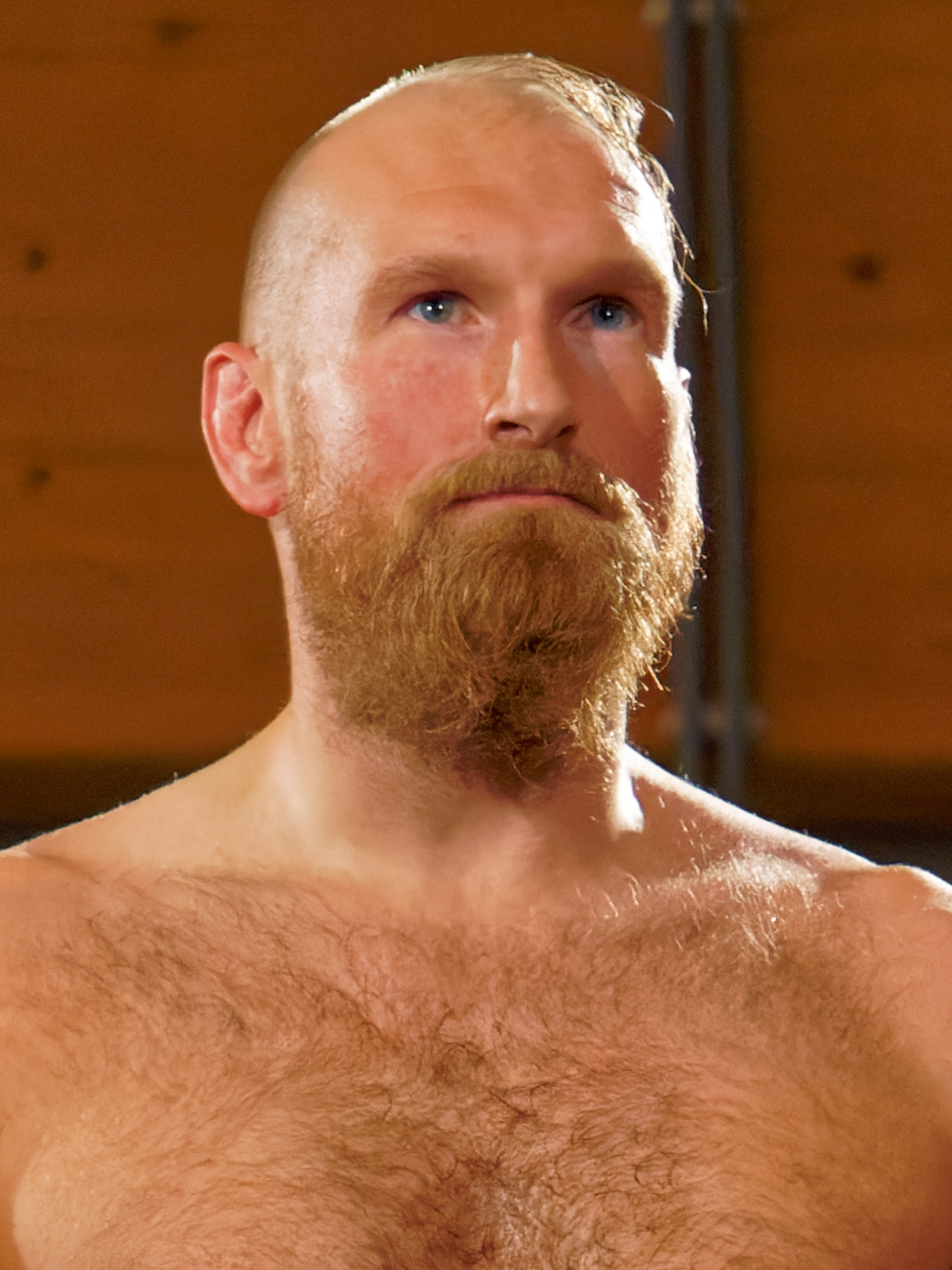
Alexander Wolfe

| L | Leader |
| * | Founding member(s) |

| Members | Joined | Left |
|---|---|---|
| Gunther (L) | 22 May 2019 * | 23 December 2024 |
| Ludwig Kaiser | 22 May 2019 * | 23 December 2024 |
| Giovanni Vinci | 22 May 2019 * | 22 April 2024 (Note: Vinci temporarily left Imperium from 5 April 2022 to 3 September 2022.) |
| Alexander Wolfe | 12 June 2019 | 18 May 2021 |

== Championships and accomplishments ==
- Pro Wrestling Illustrated
  - Ranked Gunther No. 4 of the top 500 singles wrestlers in the PWI 500 in 2023
  - Ranked Wolfe No. 215 of the top 500 singles wrestlers in the PWI 500 in 2019
  - Ranked Barthel No. 216 of the top 500 singles wrestlers in the PWI 500 in 2024
  - Ranked Aichner No. 238 of the top 500 singles wrestlers in the PWI 500 in 2020
- Progress Wrestling
  - PROGRESS World Championship (1 time) – Walter
  - Progress Atlas Championship (1 time) – Walter
- Westside Xtreme Wrestling
  - wXw Shotgun Championship (1 time) – Wolfe
- WWE
  - World Heavyweight Championship (1 time) – Gunther
  - WWE Intercontinental Championship (1 time) – Gunther
  - NXT United Kingdom Championship (Note: Walter won the title as the WWE United Kingdom Championship, but during his reign in January 2020, it was renamed to NXT United Kingdom Championship.) (1 time) – Walter
  - NXT Tag Team Championship (2 times) – Aichner and Barthel
  - King of the Ring (2024) – Gunther
- Wrestling Observer Newsletter
  - Europe MVP (2019, 2020) – Walter
