= NXT UK TakeOver: Blackpool =

2019 WWE Network event

- Promotional poster featuring various NXT UK wrestlers
- Promotion: WWE
- Brand: NXT UK
- Date: January 12, 2019
- City: Blackpool, Lancashire, England
- Venue: Empress Ballroom

WWE event chronology
← Previous; TLC: Tables, Ladders & Chairs	Next → NXT TakeOver: Phoenix

NXT UK TakeOver chronology
← Previous; First	Next → Cardiff

NXT UK TakeOver: Blackpool chronology
← Previous; First	Next → II

WWE in Europe chronology
← Previous; United Kingdom Championship Tournament	Next → NXT UK TakeOver: Cardiff

NXT UK TakeOver: Blackpool was a 2019 professional wrestling livestreaming event produced by the American company WWE, held for wrestlers from the promotion's United Kingdom-based developmental brand, NXT UK. It was simultaneously the brand's first major event, the inaugural NXT UK TakeOver event, and the first annual TakeOver: Blackpool. It took place on January 12, 2019, at the Empress Ballroom in Blackpool, Lancashire, England and aired exclusively on the WWE Network at 7:00 p.m. Greenwich Mean Time (2:00 p.m. Eastern Time).

Five matches were contested at the event. In the main event, Pete Dunne retained the WWE United Kingdom Championship against Joe Coffey in what would be his final successful title defense of his 685-day reign. After the match, Walter made his debut and attacked Coffey before having a stare-down with Dunne. Other matches included Zack Gibson and James Drake defeating Moustache Mountain (Trent Seven and Tyler Bate) to become the inaugural NXT UK Tag Team Champions, Toni Storm defeated Rhea Ripley to win the NXT UK Women's Championship, and Finn Bálor, who made a surprise appearance to replace an injured Travis Banks, defeating Jordan Devlin.

== Production ==
=== Background ===
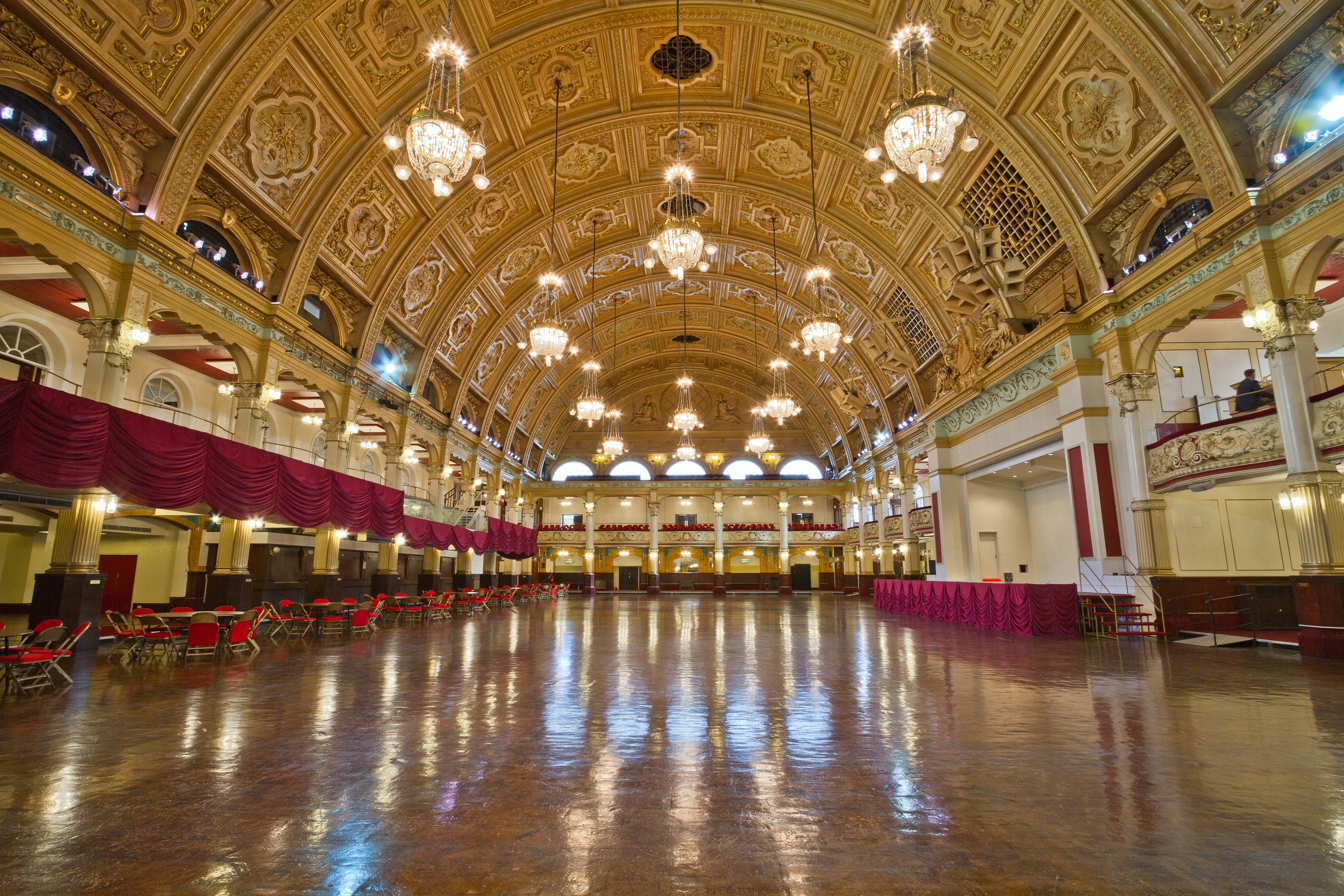
The inaugural NXT UK TakeOver event, and first annual TakeOver: Blackpool, was held at the Empress Ballroom in Blackpool, Lancashire, England.

Since May 2014, the American professional wrestling company WWE had produced a series of livestreaming events titled TakeOver for its developmental brand, NXT, which were held periodically throughout the year and aired exclusively on the WWE Network. In December 2016, the promotion announced its plans to launch a United Kingdom-based brand, which formally debuted in June 2018 as NXT UK. On November 24, 2018, it was announced that the brand would hold its first livestreaming event as TakeOver: Blackpool, adopting the TakeOver moniker for NXT UK's periodic major events. It was scheduled to be held on Saturday, January 12, 2019, at the Empress Ballroom in Blackpool, Lancashire, England, the same venue that hosted the inaugural United Kingdom Championship Tournament two years prior in January 2017, which was the genesis of NXT UK. Like many of NXT's TakeOver events, this NXT UK TakeOver was named after its host city. It aired at 7:00 p.m. Greenwich Mean Time (2:00 p.m. Eastern Time).

=== Storylines ===
The card included five matches that resulted from scripted storylines. Results were predetermined by WWE's writers on the NXT UK brand, while storylines are produced on their weekly television programme, NXT UK.

After winning the 2018 Mae Young Classic, Toni Storm declared in her promo that she could challenge for any championship of her choosing. She went on to state that she wanted to face NXT UK Women's Champion Rhea Ripley. General Manager Johnny Saint granted her match and it was later revealed that Toni Storm would face Rhea Ripley for the title at TakeOver: Blackpool.

On the January 2, 2019, episode of NXT UK, Moustache Mountain (Trent Seven and Tyler Bate) defeated Gallus (Mark Coffey and Wolfgang) to advance in the finals of the NXT Tag Team Championship tournament. The team of Zack Gibson and James Drake defeated Flash Morgan Webster and Mark Andrews to also advance to the finals on the January 9 episode. It was then made official that at TakeOver: Blackpool, Moustache Mountain would face Gibson and Drake for the inaugural NXT UK Tag Team Championship.

On the November 28, 2018, episode of NXT UK, Joe Coffey, Mark Coffey, and Wolfgang attacked Moustache Mountain (Tyler Bate and Trent Seven) after a match between Joe and Bate ended in a no-contest. Pete Dunne then attacked Joe and it was later revealed that Dunne would defend the WWE United Kingdom Championship against Joe. On the January 2, 2019, episode, a contract signing was held between the two with their championship match being made official for TakeOver: Blackpool.

On the January 2, 2019, episode of NXT UK, Dave Mastiff and Eddie Dennis fought to a no contest. Other officials and Sid Scala, assistant to General Manager Johnny Saint, failed to separate the two. This resulted in General Manager Johnny Saint announcing that at TakeOver: Blackpool, Dave Mastiff and Eddie Dennis would face each other in a No Disqualification match.

On the January 9, 2019, episode of NXT UK, a match between Travis Banks and Jordan Devlin was scheduled for TakeOver: Blackpool.

== Event ==
Other on-screen personnel
Role:	Name:
Commentators	Vic Joseph
Commentators	Nigel McGuinness
Ring announcer	Andy Shepherd
Referees	Drake Wuertz
Referees	Joel Allen
Referees	Eddie Orengo
Referees	Sean McLaughlin
Interviewer	Radzi Chinyanganya

=== Preliminary matches ===
In the opening match, Moustache Mountain (Trent Seven and Tyler Bate) faced Zack Gibson and James Drake to determine the inaugural NXT UK Tag Team Champions. Drake and Gibson performed a "Ticket to Mayhem" on Seven to win the title.

Next, Jordan Devlin was scheduled to face Travis Banks. Before the match, Banks performed a Suicide Dive on Devlin but Devlin threw Banks into the steel steps. After Banks was removed by officials, Assistant General Manager Sid Scala announced Devlin would compete, with his opponent revealed to be Finn Bálor. Bálor performed a "Coup De Grâce" on Devlin to win.

After that, Eddie Dennis faced Dave Mastiff in a No-Disqualification match. Mastiff performed "Into The Void" through a table on Dennis to win.

In the penultimate match, Rhea Ripley defended the NXT UK Women’s Championship against Toni Storm. Ripley performed a "Riptide" on Storm for a near-fall. Storm performed a "Storm Zero" on Ripley for a near-fall. Storm performed a second "Storm Zero" on Ripley to win the title.

=== Main event ===
In the main event, Pete Dunne defended the WWE United Kingdom Championship against Joe Coffey. Dunne performed the "Bitter End" on Coffey for a near-fall. Coffey performed a Discus Clothesline on Dunne for a near-fall. Coffey performed a second Discus Clothesline and a third Discus Clothesline on the floor on Dunne. Coffey performed a Pumphandle Side Slam on Dunne for a near-fall. Dunne performed a second "Bitter End" on Coffey. Dunne performed a Discus Clothesline and a third "Bitter End" on Coffey for a near-fall. Dunne forced Coffey to submit to a Triangle Choke whilst executing a Finger Snap to retain the title.

After the match, Walter made his NXT UK debut. Walter performed a Big Boot on Coffey before confronting Dunne as the event ended.

== Aftermath ==
Following the confrontation between Walter and WWE United Kingdom Champion Pete Dunne at TakeOver: Blackpool, they were eventually scheduled for a title match at NXT's TakeOver: New York.

The 2019 TakeOver: Blackpool would be the first in a subseries of UK TakeOvers titled TakeOver: Blackpool and held at the Empress Ballroom. NXT UK TakeOver: Blackpool II was held the following year, also in January. This second Blackpool event, however, would be the last of only three UK TakeOvers held due to the COVID-19 pandemic in 2020.

== Results ==
No.	Results	Stipulations	Times
1^{UK}	Ligero defeated Saxon Huxley by pinfall	Singles match	05:20
2^{UK}	Marcel Barthel and Fabian Aichner defeated Mark Andrews and Flash Morgan Webster by pinfall	Tag team match	09:38
3^{UK}	Jinny defeated Isla Dawn by pinfall	Singles match	06:42
4	Zack Gibson and James Drake defeated Moustache Mountain (Trent Seven and Tyler Bate) by pinfall	NXT UK Tag Team Championship tournament final	23:45
5	Finn Bálor (Note: Bálor replaced Travis Banks due to Banks being injured by Devlin in a pre-match attack.) defeated Jordan Devlin by pinfall	Singles match	11:45
6	Dave Mastiff defeated Eddie Dennis by pinfall	No Disqualification match	10:50
7	Toni Storm defeated Rhea Ripley (c) by pinfall	Singles match for the NXT UK Women's Championship	14:50
8	Pete Dunne (c) defeated Joe Coffey by submission	Singles match for the WWE United Kingdom Championship	34:15
(c) / – the champion(s) heading into the match; UK / – the match was taped for a future broadcast of NXT UK

=== NXT UK Tag Team Championship Tournament Bracket ===
Semifinals; NXT UK tapings (24 and 25 November; Aired 2 and 9 January)
Moustache Mountain (Trent Seven and Tyler Bate)	Pin
Gallus (Mark Coffey and Wolfgang)	14:39
Zack Gibson and James Drake	Pin
Flash Morgan Webster and Mark Andrews	9:06

Final; NXT UK TakeOver: Blackpool (12 January)
Moustache Mountain	23:45
Zack Gibson and James Drake	Pin
