= NXT UK TakeOver: Dublin =

Cancelled WWE Network event

- NXT UK TakeOver: Dublin logo
- Promotion: WWE
- Brand: NXT UK
- Date: June 20, 2021 (cancelled)
- City: Dublin, Ireland
- Venue: 3Arena

NXT UK TakeOver: Dublin was a scheduled professional wrestling livestreaming event that would have been produced by the American company WWE. It would have been the fourth NXT UK TakeOver event held for wrestlers from the promotion's United Kingdom-based developmental brand, NXT UK. The event was scheduled to take place at the 3Arena in Dublin, Ireland, which would have made it the first NXT UK TakeOver held outside the United Kingdom.

The event was originally planned to be held on April 26, 2020, but was rescheduled to October 25 due to the COVID-19 pandemic, which began affecting all of WWE's programming in mid-March that year. However, due to the ongoing pandemic, the event was rescheduled once again, this time to June 20, 2021. However, on April 30 that year, the event was officially cancelled.

== Production ==
=== Background ===
Since May 2014, the American professional wrestling company WWE had produced a series of livestreaming events titled TakeOver for its NXT brand, which were held periodically throughout the year and aired exclusively on the WWE Network. After the United Kingdom-based NXT UK formally debuted in June 2018, the brand held its first major livestreaming event as TakeOver: Blackpool in January 2019, adopting the "TakeOver" name for its major periodic events that were also livestreamed exclusively on the WWE Network. Announced on February 16, 2020, the fourth NXT UK TakeOver event was scheduled as TakeOver: Dublin. It was planned to be held at the 3Arena and was named after the venue's city of Dublin, Ireland. It would have been the first NXT UK TakeOver event held outside the United Kingdom.

The event was originally scheduled to take place on April 26, 2020. Due to the COVID-19 pandemic that began affecting the industry in mid-March, however, the event was postponed and rescheduled to occur on October 25. The ongoing pandemic caused the event to be rescheduled once again, this time to June 20, 2021. However, on April 30 that year, the event was removed from the 3Arena's scheduled events, with WWE subsequently confirming its cancellation. However later held as Raw on 2027 at nearby first time in 3Arena
