= 3Arena (Dublin) =

Indoor amphitheatre in Dublin, Ireland

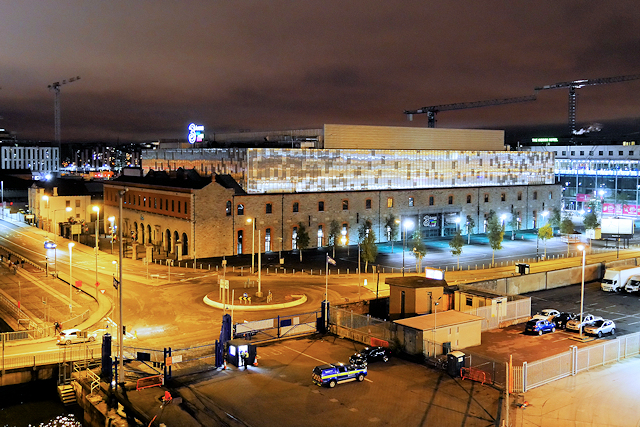
- Exterior view of the arena (c. 2017)
- Interactive map of 3Arena
- Former names: The Point, The O_{2} (2008–2014)
- Address: North Wall Quay; Dublin D1; D01 EW90; Ireland
- Location: Point Village
- Coordinates: 53°20′51″N 06°13′43″W
- Owner: Apollo Leisure Group, Ltd
- Operator: Live Nation Ireland
- Capacity: 9,300 (seated); 13,000 (with standing)

Construction
- Built: 2007–2008
- Opened: 16 December 2008
- Cost: €80 million
- Architect: HOK Sport
- Project manager: AECOM
- Structural engineer: BuroHappold
- General contractor: DLPKS
- Main contractor: Walls Construction

Website
- Official website

The 3Arena (originally The O_{2}) is an indoor amphitheatre located at North Wall Quay in the Dublin Docklands in Dublin, Ireland. The venue opened as The O_{2} on 16 December 2008 and was re-branded on 4 September 2014 due to the takeover of O2 Ireland by Three Ireland. The venue is owned by a Live Nation subsidiary, Apollo Leisure Group Ltd. and is among the top ten busiest music arenas by ticket sales in the world.

It was built on the site of the former Point Theatre, a smaller music venue which operated from 1988 to 2007, retaining only some of the outer facade. The Point Theatre was branded as "The Point Depot", in recognition of its original role as a railway goods handling facility.

== Naming ==
Following its closure in 2007, the site underwent major redevelopment and was renamed The O2 after the telecommunication brand, O2, similar to The O2 in London. In 2008, O2 paid €25 million for the naming rights for 10 years. Following the sale of mobile network operator O2 Ireland to rival 3 Ireland in June 2014, the venue was renamed as the 3Arena on 4 September 2014.

== Structure and design ==
The furthest seat is 60 metres from the stage, 20 metres closer than in The Point. This was achieved by arranging the seats around the stage in a gigantic "fan" formation, which the architects likened to the Colosseum of Rome. There are no corporate boxes inside the venue. The backstage area has a "substantial" loading bay for trucks. Alcohol is available in a high-security area of the venue in an effort to curb underage drinking. Prior to re-development, the seating capacity was 6,300 or 8,500 standing.

Mike Adamson (CEO of Live Nation Ireland) claimed that Irish fans had been short-changed when attending major events in the previous venue due to size restrictions. "It wasn't always possible to get every show touring in Europe into the venue because of restrictions. It is now. Some shows couldn't fit. For example, George Michael could only stage three-quarters of his production in the Point. We're up there now with other venues in Europe." Developer Harry Crosbie said that the Point had had a "grungy" feel, which suited Dublin at the time". He claimed that it would be a "stunning venue" created for a more "sophisticated" audience.

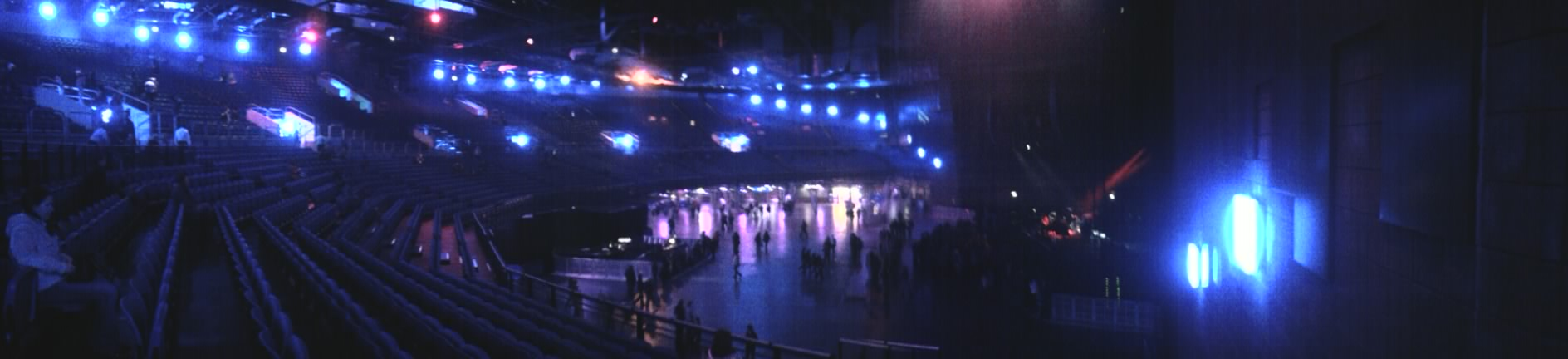
Panorama view of inside the venue (2009)

== Attendance ==
In 2011, the venue was named as the fifth busiest music arena in the world with ticket sales of 670,000 putting it behind The O_{2} Arena in London, the Manchester Arena, Antwerp's Sportpaleis and Melbourne's Rod Laver Arena. In 2012 it rose to 4th place, and in 2013 it dropped to 9th place.

== Notable/historic performances ==
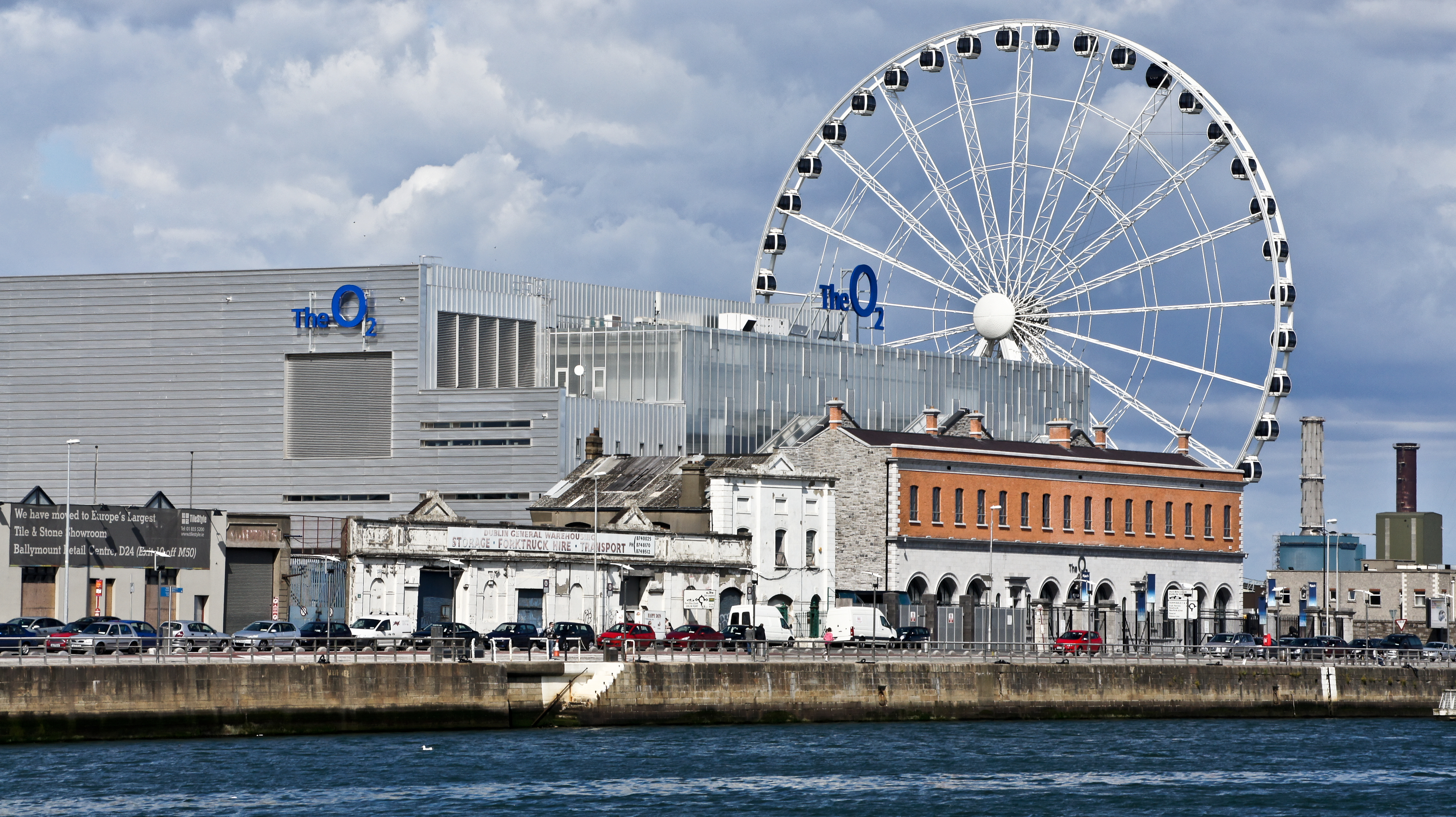
The venue as the O2 Arena in 2011

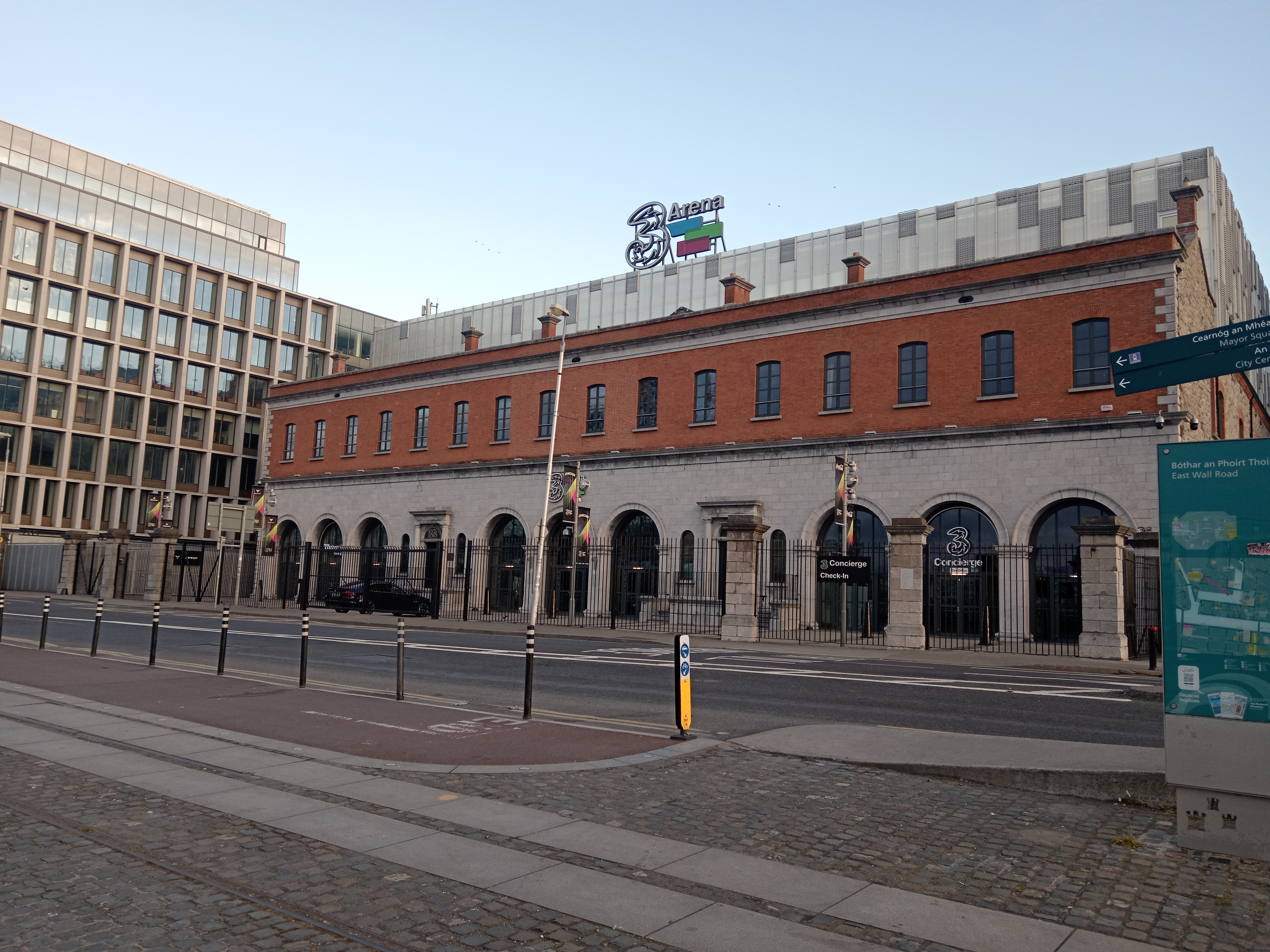
Venue including 3Arena signage, 2025

U2 were the first band to play in the venue, when Bono and The Edge performed "Van Diemen's Land" and "Desire" to a private audience.

The first event to take place at the arena was the ChildLine Concert on 16 December 2008.

There was a controversial Guns N' Roses show in September 2010 during which the band had arrived a substantial amount of time late, then had bottles hurled at them and stopped performing. Most of the audience then left the building in disgust, but the band later returned to finish the show. The band returned in 2012 and only achieved 47% capacity at the show.

Rammstein performed their first-ever show in Ireland at the arena on 27 February 2012 as part of their Made in Germany 1995-2011 Tour.

Since March 2014, the arena has hosted the C2C: Country to Country festival and is the second-longest-running host venue after the O_{2} Arena in London.

In July 2014, UFC Fight Night: McGregor vs. Brandao took place at the arena. The event sold out within minutes of tickets going on sale. It remains Conor McGregor's only UFC fight that took place in his hometown of Dublin.

U2 performed four homecoming concerts in November 2015, as part of their Innocence + Experience Tour. The full U2 stage setup could not be brought to the 3Arena due to the venue's configuration as an amphitheatre. The U2 stage was designed for a full indoor arena, but was reconfigured for the concerts in the 3Arena.

Since December 2015, the Arena has voluntarily hosted the RTÉ 2fm Xmas Ball, a yearly charity gig in aid of ISPCC. Over the years, headliners of the ball have included the likes of Kodaline, Hozier, Picture This and The Script.

Adele performed at the arena on 4 and 5 March 2016 during her world tour.

Britney Spears brought her Piece of Me Tour on 20 August 2018. Additionally, tickets for the show sold out within 10 minutes of its availability.

Demi Lovato performed at the arena on 25 May 2018 as part of their Tell Me You Love Me World Tour.

Twenty One Pilots performed at the 3Arena on 1 March 2019 during the European leg of the Bandito Tour. This was the duo's first Dublin show in nearly 5 years, the last being their headline show at the Academy in November 2014 during the Quiet is Violent Tour

On 22 May 2019, Mariah Carey took to the arena stage in her first-ever show in Ireland, as part of her Caution World Tour.

Ariana Grande performed three dates at the arena during her Sweetener World Tour in 2019.

Christina Aguilera performed at the arena during her the X Tour (2019).

The 1975 have played the arena four times, having performed on 24 March 2016, as part of their I Like It When You Sleep Tour, on 10 January 2019 on the first leg of the UK and Ireland Music for Cars Tour, on 3 March 2020 on the last date of the second UK & Ireland leg of the Music for Cars Tour and on 29 January 2023 as part of the At Their Very Best Tour.

WWE has been a frequent visitor to the venue, having hosted multiple house shows there every year since 2009. At a SmackDown house show on 9 May 2019, Charlotte Flair and Dublin native Becky Lynch main evented the show in a match for the SmackDown Women's Championship, becoming the first women to ever main event a professional wrestling event at the arena. The arena was supposed to host NXT UK's fourth TakeOver event, NXT UK TakeOver: Dublin, on 20 June 2021. This was to be the first televised WWE event in Ireland. On 30 April, however, the event was cancelled due to the COVID-19 pandemic. WWE eventually premiered in Ireland at the venue on 22 August 2025, airing SmackDown live on Netflix for most international markets and on tape delay 5 hours later on the USA Network in the United States; appearances on the show included Lynch, Randy Orton and John Cena.

Katie Taylor made her Irish professional debut at the arena on 20 May 2023 when she unsuccessfully challenged Chantelle Cameron for the undisputed super-lightweight championship. This was shown worldwide on DAZN.

== Transport ==
Patrons are advised to use public transport to get to the venue. Parking services for the nearby Point Village are suggested. In addition to the ferry services and shuttle buses noted on the venue's website, Dublin Bus route 151 provides a scheduled public service to the venue.

Due to the high volume of pedestrian traffic leaving the venue after concerts, extensive traffic restrictions are put in place along the North Wall Quay after such events, which can cause both the North Wall Quay and the East-Link (Dublin) toll bridge to be restricted for vehicular traffic by the Gardaí.

A Luas light rail extension from the Red Line to the back of the venue opened on 8 December 2009, and links the DART train services at Connolly Station to the venue. It coincided with a performance by Lily Allen. The Luas stop is called The Point.

Those travelling to the 3Arena from Dublin Airport can avail of either the public Dublin Bus route 747, or the Greystones or Dalkey Aircoach services that stop outside the venue, while several other private operators also call at the venue.

== Rules ==
Age restriction can also vary according to show format, although standing is restricted to those over 14 and guest under 16 generally need to be accompanied by an adult; and maximum bag size of 40cm*40cm*20cm, with large and oversized bags not permitted. Individual shows can have their own requirements.
