= Empress Ballroom =

Venue in Blackpool England (opened 1896)

Coordinates: 53.817°N 3.050°W

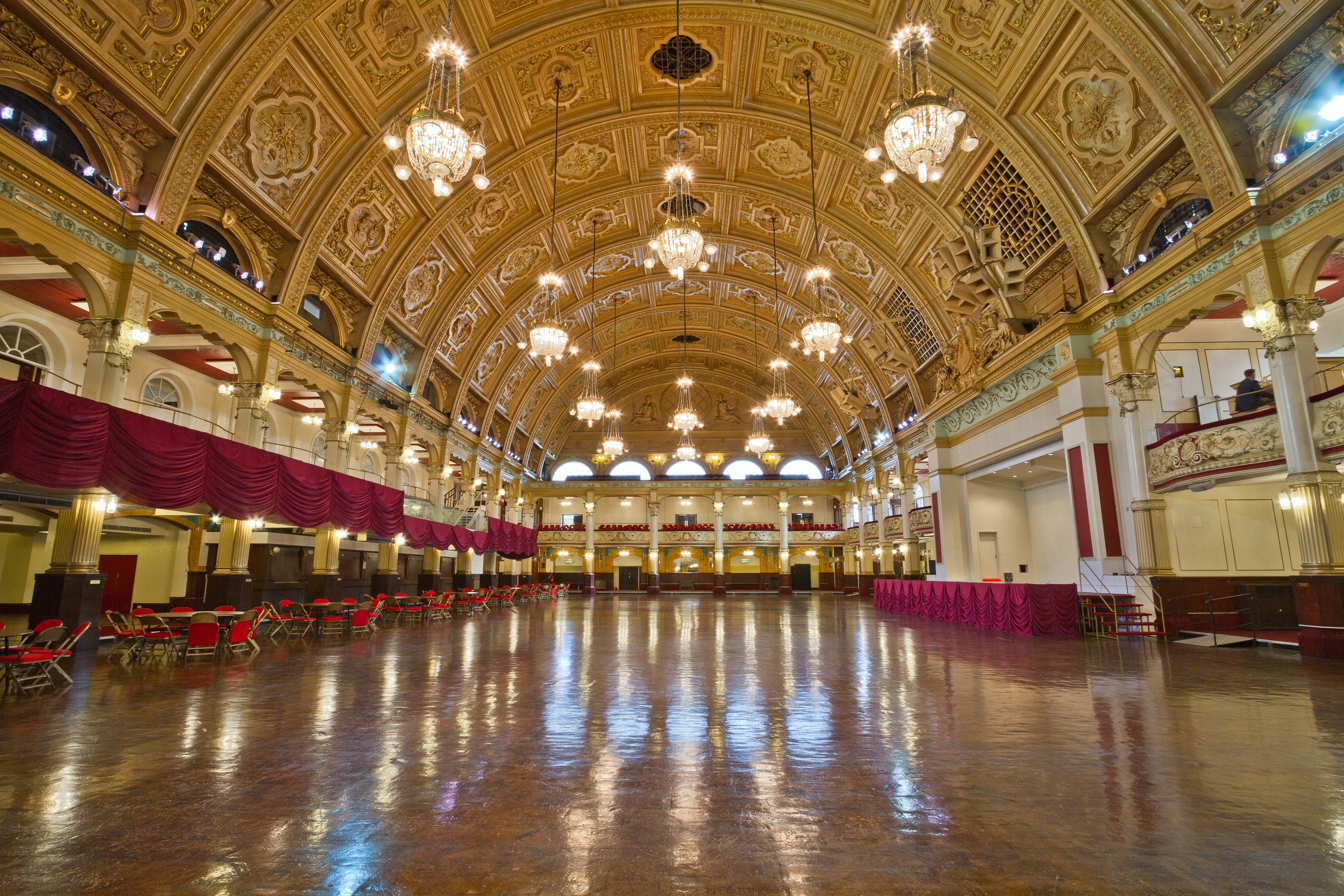
- The grand hall (c.2012)
- Interactive map of Empress Ballroom
- Former names: Stardust Garden (1970-74)
- Address: 97 Church St; Blackpool FY1 1HL England
- Location: Winter Gardens
- Owner: Blackpool Council
- Capacity: 3,000

Construction
- Groundbreaking: 1894
- Opened: August 1896
- Renovated: 1934
- Architects: Manghall and Littlewood
- Structural engineer: Widnes Foundry Company
- General contractors: Whitehead and Son

The Empress Ballroom is an entertainment venue in Blackpool, Lancashire, England. It is located within the Winter Gardens, a large entertainment complex in the town centre.

As part of the Winter Gardens, the ballroom is a Grade II* Listed Building. It is operated by Crown Leisure Ltd, on behalf of Blackpool Council, who purchased the property from Leisure Parcs Ltd as part of a £40 million deal in 2010.

It hosts a variety of events including conferences, concerts, dance and darts competitions as well as trade fairs, and for the first time (in August 2018) the British Beard & Moustache Championships. It has hosted the main annual conferences for all three major British political parties: the Conservative Party Conference, Labour Party Conference and the twice-annual Liberal Democrat Conference, as well as those of a number of trade unions.

== History ==
The venue was built in 1896. It was designed by Manghall and Littlewood of Manchester, and decorated by J.M.Boekbinder. At 110 by 189 ft (34 by 58 m) with 20,790 sq ft (1,931 m^{2}) of floor space, the ballroom was one of the largest in the world. It has a barrel-vaulted ceiling, decoratively treated as a square-coffered vault with relief patterned panels, with twelve glass chandeliers. The ballroom has a decorated balcony on three sides,

It was requisitioned by the Admiralty in 1918 for military use during World War I to assemble gas envelopes for the R.33 airship, before being handed back a year later. The floor was replaced in late 1934 with 10,000 pieces of oak, mahogany, walnut and greenwood, laid over 1,320 four-inch springs. It is one of the few remaining sprung dancefloors in Britain. A new stage was also built, with space for a lift provided for the Wurlitzer organ console.

The Wurlitzer organ that was installed in the Empress Ballroom in the winter of 1934/35 was originally from the Tower Ballroom. Its specification was enlarged to match the specification of the new organ at the Tower Ballroom. The console was placed on a lift in the centre of the stage, and the pipe chambers directly above the stage. Horace Finch, pianist and accordionist for Bertini's Tower Ballroom band, was appointed the position of Empress Ballroom Organist from 1935 to 1962. The organ was removed in 1969 and was installed in the BBC Playhouse Studio in Manchester. It was in use there until its removal in 1988 after which it was purchased and parted out by the Sussex Theatre Organ Trust

The Empress Ballroom was a popular dance venue until the 1960s with British dance bands playing summer residences of four weeks during the summer seasons. They included the bands of Geraldo, Joe Loss, Ted Heath, John Dankworth, Jack Parnell, and Ken McIntosh.

In 1964, the Rolling Stones caused a riot at the ballroom during a series of UK dates. Fifty fans and two policemen were treated at Blackpool Victoria Hospital. Four of the offending fans appeared in court the following day. The band was banned from performing in the town; the ban was lifted in 2008, 44 years after the event.

In the late 1970s, some of the floor space was adapted for other purposes to reduce the venue's over-capacity. It was used in the summer seasons of 1970–74 as a cabaret-dining venue called The Stardust Garden.

The ballroom has been used as a venue for many years by the Labour Party Conference, Conservative Party Conference and Liberal Democrat Conference. The ballroom has hosted the World Matchplay darts tournament, run by the Professional Darts Corporation, since 1994, which is shown live on Sky Sports. It also hosts numerous dance competitions, such as the British Sequence Championships and the Blackpool Dance Festival, an annual ballroom dance competition, since its inception in 1920.

On 1 March 1974, the ballroom was the venue for the opening concert of Queen's first ever headlining tour of the UK.

On 14 and 15 January 2017, the ballroom hosted a two-day tournament to crown the first-ever WWE United Kingdom Champion. On 12 January 2019, it hosted NXT UK TakeOver: Blackpool, the first-ever NXT UK TakeOver event. This was followed one year later with NXT UK TakeOver: Blackpool II on 12 January 2020.

The ballroom is used as the Main Stage of the punk rock Rebellion Festival held each year at the Winter Gardens.
