= NXT UK Women's Championship =

Former women's professional wrestling championship in WWE

- The NXT UK Women's Championship belt with default side plates.

Details
- Promotion: WWE
- Date established: 18 June 2018
- Date retired: 4 September 2022 (unified with the NXT Women's Championship)
Statistics
- First champion: Rhea Ripley
- Final champion: Meiko Satomura
- Longest reign: Kay Lee Ray (649 days) (Note: The actual length of the reign is undeterminable, as the actual date Kay Lee Ray lost the championship is unknown. As such, the reign length indicated here is what WWE officially recognizes for the reign.)
- Shortest reign: Rhea Ripley (139 days) (Note: WWE recognizes 44 days due to tape delay.)
- Oldest champion: Meiko Satomura (41 years, 205 days)
- Youngest champion: Rhea Ripley (21 years, 319 days)
- Heaviest champion: Meiko Satomura (150 lb (68 kg))
- Lightest champion: Kay Lee Ray (112 lb (51 kg))

The NXT UK Women's Championship was a women's professional wrestling championship that was created and promoted by the American promotion WWE. It was defended on the NXT UK brand division, a sister brand of WWE's developmental territory NXT based in the United Kingdom. Established on 18 June 2018, the inaugural champion was Rhea Ripley. On 4 September 2022 at Worlds Collide, the title was unified into the NXT Women's Championship, officially retiring the title in the process, with Meiko Satomura recognized as the final champion.

== History ==
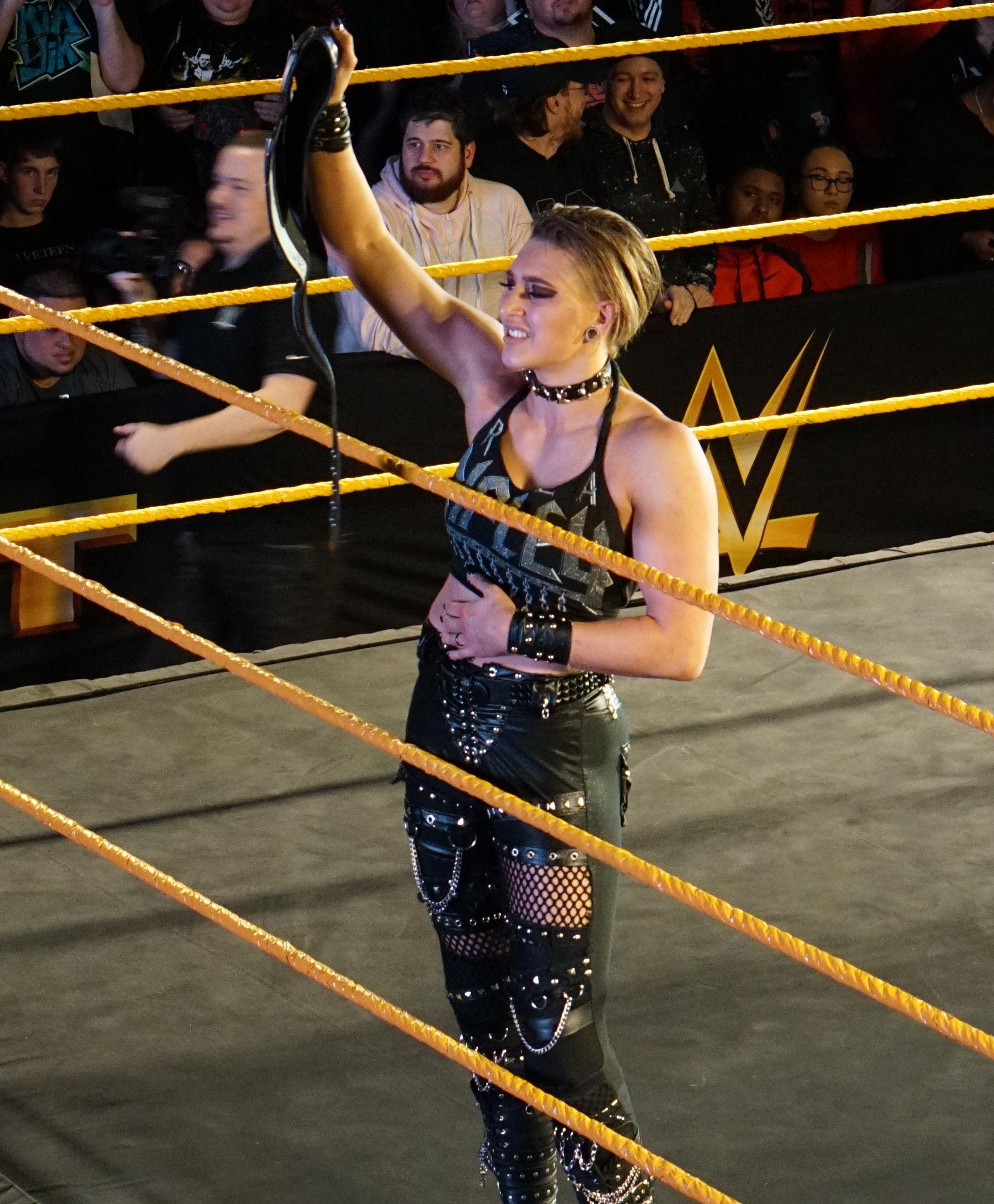
Inaugural champion Rhea Ripley

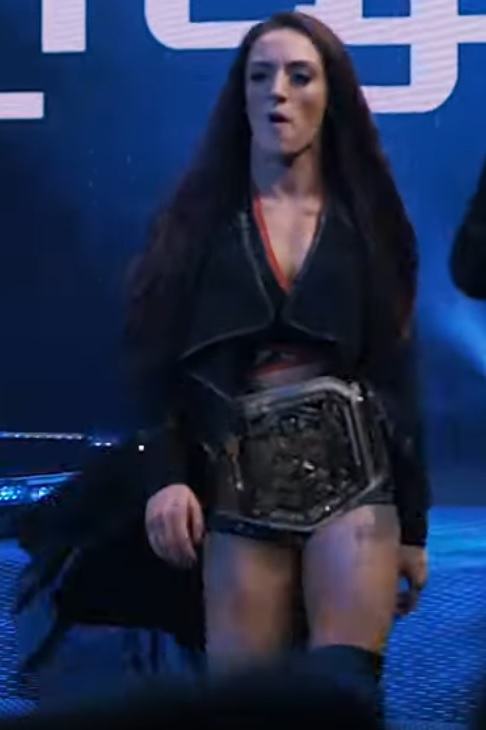
Longest reigning champion Kay Lee Ray, who held the title for 649 days (as recognized by WWE)

In a press conference at The O2 Arena on 15 December 2016, the American professional wrestling promotion WWE announced plans to establish a United Kingdom-based brand on which professional wrestlers from the country would compete. A men's title, the WWE United Kingdom Championship (later renamed to NXT United Kingdom Championship), was established that same day, however, it was not until mid-2018 when NXT UK was formally established as the United Kingdom-based brand, and sister brand of the American-based NXT. On 18 June during the first night of the 2018 United Kingdom Championship Tournament, the NXT UK Women's Championship, along with the NXT UK Tag Team Championship, was announced for the NXT UK brand. Afterwards, a two-day eight-woman single-elimination tournament was scheduled to crown the inaugural champion during the first tapings of NXT UK. During the 26 August tapings, Rhea Ripley defeated Toni Storm in the tournament final to become the inaugural NXT UK Women's Champion (aired 28 November).

In January 2020, WWE briefly began referring to the women's championship as the "NXT UK Championship" to bring it on an equal level as the men's title, though reverted to calling it the NXT UK Women's Championship soon after; it remained as NXT UK Women's Championship on the official title history during this time.

In August 2022, WWE announced that the NXT UK brand would go on hiatus and would relaunch as NXT Europe at a later time. As such, NXT UK's championships were unified into their respective NXT championship counterparts. Subsequently, the NXT UK Women's Championship was retired on 4 September 2022 at Worlds Collide. At the event, Mandy Rose defeated Blair Davenport and reigning NXT UK Women's Champion Meiko Satomura in a triple threat match to unify the NXT UK Women's Championship into Rose's NXT Women's Championship, with Satomura recognized as the final NXT UK Women's Champion. Rose went forward as the unified NXT Women's Champion.

=== Inaugural tournament ===
Quarterfinals; NXT UK; August 25, 2018 (Aired: November 14–21)
Dakota Kai	Pinfall
Nina Samuels	4:39
Rhea Ripley	Pinfall
Xia Brookside	5:13
Jinny	Pinfall
Millie McKenzie	4:54
Toni Storm	Pinfall
Isla Dawn	4:06

Semifinals; NXT UK; August 26, 2018 (Aired: November 21)
Dakota Kai	9:51
Rhea Ripley	Pinfall
Jinny	10:30
Toni Storm	Pinfall

Final; NXT UK; August 26, 2018 (Aired: November 28)
Rhea Ripley	Pinfall
Toni Storm	9:27

== Championship belt design ==
The championship's center plate was inspired by the United Kingdom's royal coat of arms

The championship belt was revealed during the 25 August 2018 tapings of NXT UK. It was nearly identical to its male counterpart, the NXT United Kingdom Championship. Like the United Kingdom Championship, the center plate was modeled after the United Kingdom's royal coat of arms, featuring a lion and a horse (instead of the traditional unicorn) on either side of the arms, while at the center of the plate featured a shield with the NXT UK logo; atop the shield were the crown jewels. Above the arms was a banner that read "United Kingdom", directly below the shield was a banner that read "Women's", and below that was a banner that read "Champion". Gold divider bars separated the center plate from the belt's two side plates. In what became a prominent feature for WWE's championship belts, the two side plates featured removable center sections that could be replaced with the reigning champion's logo; the default side plates featured the WWE logo on a red globe. Like the Raw and SmackDown Women's Championship belts, the strap was white and smaller than the men's.

== Reigns ==
Over the championship's four-year, 9 day history, there were four reigns between four champions. Rhea Ripley was the inaugural champion and was also the youngest champion when she won the title at the age of 21, while Meiko Satomura was the oldest at 41 and is recognized as the final champion. Kay Lee Ray had the longest reign, which WWE recognizes as lasting 649 days (beginning 31 August 2019 and ending 10 June 2021); the actual length of her reign is undeterminable as the real date she lost the title is unknown. Ripley had the shortest reign at 139 days (44 days as recognized by WWE due to tape delay).

Key
No.	Overall reign number
Reign	Reign number for the specific champion
Days	Number of days held
Days recog.	Number of days held recognized by the promotion
N/A	Unknown information

No.	Champion	Championship change			Reign statistics			Notes	Ref.
No.	Champion	Date	Event	Location	Reign	Days	Days recog.	Notes	Ref.
WWE: NXT UK
1	Rhea Ripley	26 August 2018	NXT UK	Birmingham, England	1	139	44	Defeated Toni Storm in the tournament final to become the inaugural champion. WWE recognizes Ripley's reign as beginning on 28 November 2018, when the episode aired on tape delay.	
2	Toni Storm	12 January 2019	TakeOver: Blackpool	Blackpool, England	1	231	230		
3	Kay Lee Ray	31 August 2019	TakeOver: Cardiff	Cardiff, Wales	1	N/A	649	WWE recognizes this reign as ending on 10 June 2021, when the match aired on tape delay. The actual date of when she lost the title is unknown. Ray moved to the NXT brand shortly after losing the title and her ring name was changed to Alba Fyre in early 2022. WWE's official title history subsequently changed her listing to the Alba Fyre ring name; however, her name listed here is the name she held the title under.	
4	Meiko Satomura	10 June 2021 (air date)	NXT UK	London, England	1	N/A	451	WWE recognizes this reign as beginning on 10 June 2021, when the episode aired on tape delay. The actual date of when the match took place is unknown.	
—	Unified	4 September 2022	Worlds Collide	Orlando, Florida, U.S.	—	—	—	Mandy Rose defeated Meiko Satomura and Blair Davenport in a triple threat match to unify the NXT UK Women's Championship into the NXT Women's Championship. The NXT UK Women's Championship was retired with Satomura recognized as the final champion. Rose went forward as the unified NXT Women's Champion.	
