= Tyler Bate =

British professional wrestler (born 1997)

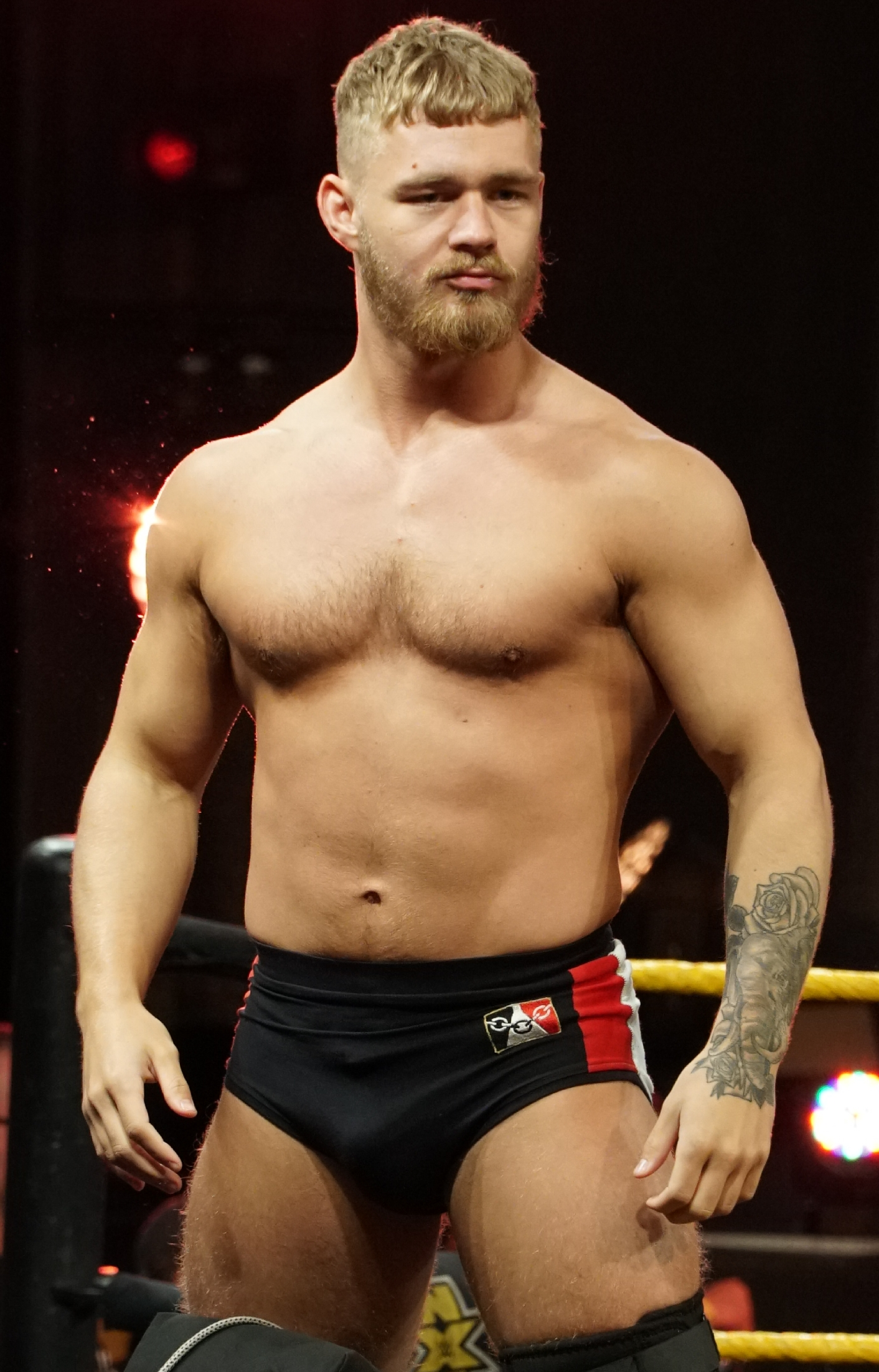
- Bate in 2018

Personal information
- Born: 7 March 1997 (age 29) Dudley, West Midlands, England

Professional wrestling career
- Ring name(s): Arthur Klauser-Saxon; Bravo Americano; Elephant Mask; Tyler Bate; The Big Strong Boi
- Billed height: 5 ft 7 in (170 cm)
- Billed weight: 175 lb (79 kg)
- Billed from: Dudley, England
- Trained by: Dave Mastiff; Trent Seven
- Debut: 2012

Tyler Bate (born 7 March 1997) is an English professional wrestler. He is signed to WWE where he performs on the Smackdown and NXT brands as the masked wrestler Bravo Americano and is a member of the Los Americanos stable. He also performs in Lucha Libre AAA Worldwide (AAA).

In 2017, he became the inaugural WWE United Kingdom Champion (later renamed NXT United Kingdom Championship), making him the youngest singles champion in WWE history aged 19. Bate is the only wrestler to become a NXT UK Triple Crown winner, holding the NXT United Kingdom Championship, NXT UK Tag Team Championship, and NXT UK Heritage Cup. He was also the only two-time NXT United Kingdom Champion and is recognized as the final holder of the title.

He is also known for teaming with Trent Seven as Moustache Mountain; the two have held the NXT Tag Team Championship, Chikara Campeonatos de Parejas, Progress Tag Team Championship, and RPW Undisputed British Tag Team Championship. Bate, Seven, and Pete Dunne collectively form the British Strong Style; the three were nicknamed "the founding fathers of NXT UK" by WWE, due to their crucial part in the creation and growth of the brand.

== Professional wrestling career ==
=== Preston City Wrestling (2014–2015) ===
Bate debuted in Preston City Wrestling as "The Iron Master" Tyler Bate at PCW Fright Night III, competing unsuccessfully in a 4-way match also featuring Charlie Garrett, Rich Swann and Zack Gibson. Bate returned to hat Shooting Star in January 2015, aligning himself with The Hunter Brothers and Ryan Smile. Bate and his team were then defeated by Pete Dunne, Damian Dunne, Morgan Webster and Mark Andrews.

=== Chikara (2015–2017) ===
In early 2015, Bate, alongside Trent Seven, debuted in American promotion Chikara as part of their tour of the United Kingdom, defeating The Hunter Brothers in a dark match on 3 April and losing to the Devastation Corporation (Max Smashmaster and Blaster McMassive) in another dark match on 6 April. In their final dark match on the tour, Seven and Bate teamed with Clint Margera to take on Pete Dunne, Damian Dunne and Jimmy Havoc in a losing effort. Bate teamed with Seven and Dan Moloney at that year's King of Trios as Team Fight Club: Pro, making it to the semi-finals before being eliminated by the Bullet Club (AJ Styles, Matt Jackson and Nick Jackson). In 2016, Seven and Bate began competing more regularly in Chikara, and on 21 August, they defeated Los Ice Creams (Hijo Del Ice Cream and Ice Cream Jr.), N_R_G (Hype Rockwell and Race Jaxon) and The Devastation Corporation to win the Chikara Campeonatos de Parejas. They never returned to Chikara to defend the titles, and were stripped of them for inactivity on 15 December during Chikara's secret season 16.

Bate returned to Chikara on 1 September 2017, when he, Trent Seven and Pete Dunne, billed collectively as "House Strong Style", entered the 2017 King of Trios, defeating House Whitewolf (A-Kid, Adam Chase and Zayas) in their first round match. Over the next two days, House Strong Style defeated House Throwbacks (Dasher Hatfield, Mark Angelosetti and Simon Grimm) in the quarterfinals, House Rot (Frightmare, Hallowicked and Kobald) via forfeit in the semifinals and House Sendai Girls (Cassandra Miyagi, Dash Chisako and Meiko Satomura) in the finals to win the 2017 King of Trios.

=== Progress Wrestling (2016–2019) ===
Bate debuted in Progress Wrestling at Chapter 22, losing to William Eaver in a Natural Progression Series quarter final match. His first appearance in Progress alongside Trent Seven as Moustache Mountain was in a loss to Damian and Pete Dunne at Chapter 28. At Chapter 33, Moustache Mountain split after Seven turned heel, attacking Bate and aligning with Pete Dunne to form British Strong Style. At Chapter 39, Bate returned to Progress, attacking Jimmy Havoc during a seven-man elimination match for the vacant Progress World Championship, turning heel and aligning himself with Seven and Dunne. On 16 December, Seven and Dunne were stripped of the Progress Tag Team Championship after Dunne attempted to give his half of the shield to Bate. Two weeks later at Chapter 41, Seven and Bate defeated The London Riots and The LDRS of the New School (Zack Sabre Jr. and Marty Scurll) in a three-way tag team match to win the vacant title. Bate made it to the finals of the Super Strong Style 16 Tournament, defeating Pastor William Eaver, Mark Haskins, Matt Riddle, before losing to Travis Banks in the final. At Chapter 50, Bate and Seven lost the Tag Team Championships to #CCK (Chris Brookes and Kid Lykos). After regaining the title, Bate and Seven lost it again to #CCK in a ladder match on 10 September 2017.

=== WWE (2016–present) ===
==== United Kingdom Champion (2016–2017) ====
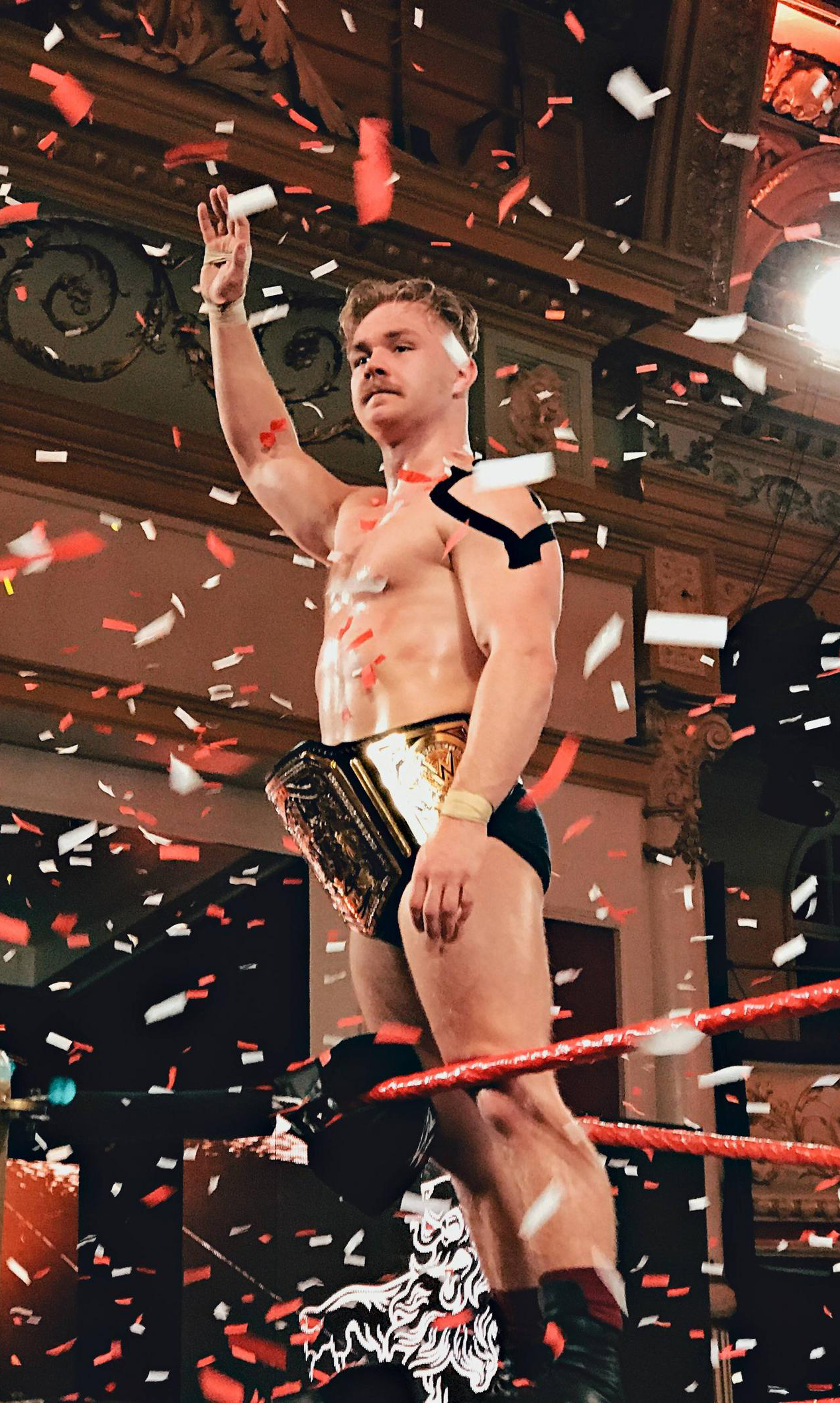
Tyler Bate is the first United Kingdom Champion.

On 15 December 2016, it was revealed that Bate would be one of 16 men competing in a two night tournament to crown the inaugural WWE United Kingdom Champion on 14 and 15 January 2017. Bate defeated Tucker in the first round to advance to the quarter-finals, before defeating Jordan Devlin to advance to the semi-finals. Bate then defeated Wolfgang in the semi-finals and Pete Dunne in the final to win the tournament and become the inaugural champion. Bate was presented with the title belt by Triple H, William Regal, Finn Bálor and Fit Finlay. At 19 years old, he became the second teenager in WWE history to win a title, and the second (at the time, presently third) youngest champion of all time, after René Duprée. Bate signed a contract with WWE, which allowed him to continue taking independent bookings with some restrictions.

On 1 February episode of NXT, Tyler Bate made his NXT debut defeating Oney Lorcan. On 15 February edition of NXT, Tyler Bate successfully defended his title against fellow UK Tournament and tag team partner Trent Seven in the main event, with the two of them showing sportsmanship in the end. On 4 April, Bate and others who participated in the United Kingdom Championship Tournament appeared on 205 Live. On 26 April episode of NXT, Bate successfully defended his championship against Jack Gallagher, a member of the Raw roster. At NXT TakeOver: Chicago, Bate would lose his championship to Pete Dunne, ending his reign at 125 days. The match was named Match of the Year at the NXT Year-End Awards. On 7 November 2017, Bate would make his 205 Live debut, where he was defeated by Cruiserweight Champion Enzo Amore. On 20 December episode of NXT, Bate received his rematch for the WWE United Kingdom Championship, but again lost to Dunne.

==== Moustache Mountain (2018–2022) ====
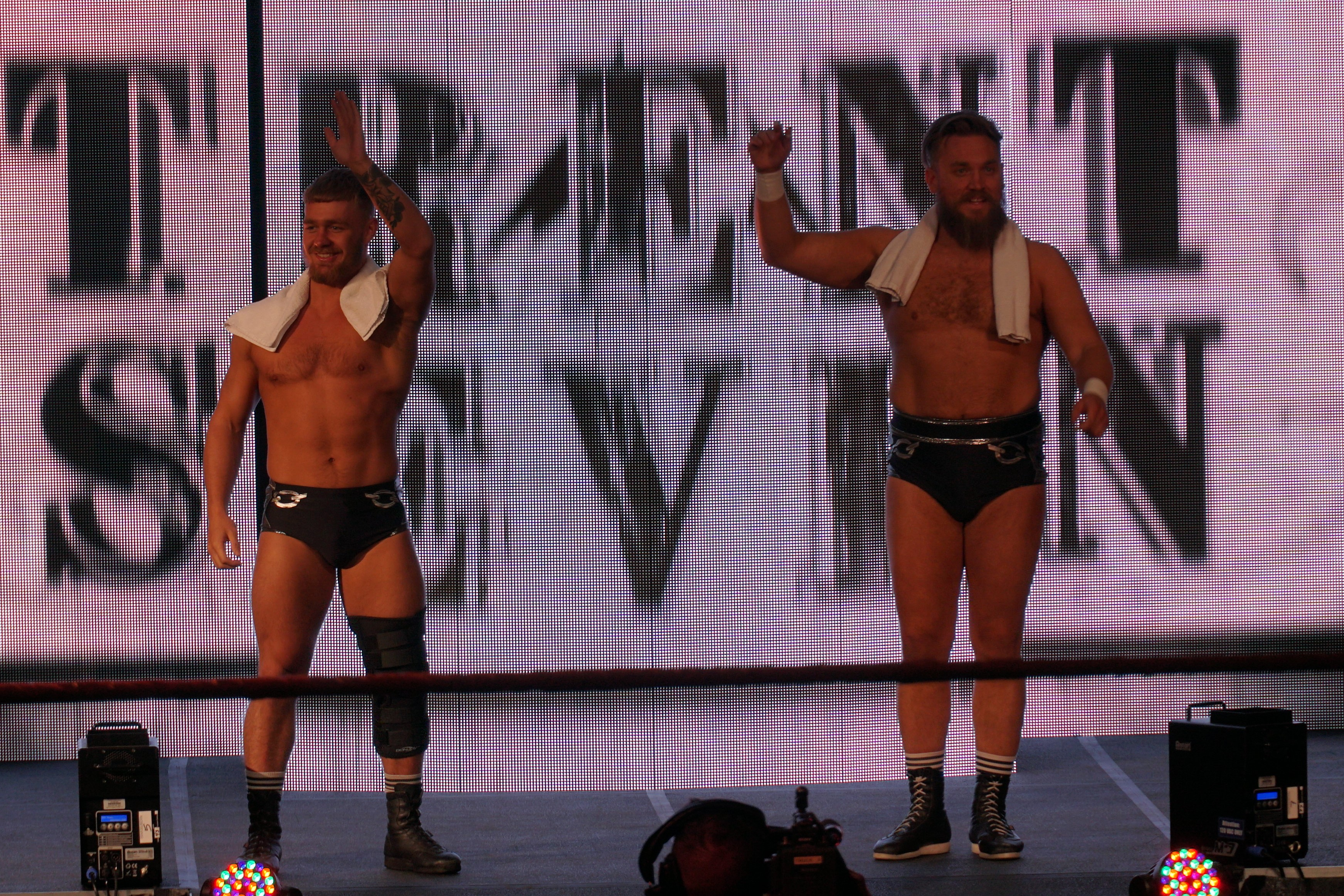
Bate (left) and Seven (right) at WrestleMania Axxess in April 2018.

On 30 January 2018 episode of 205 Live, Bate would compete in the WWE Cruiserweight Championship tournament, where he was defeated by TJP in the first round. On 15 May 2018, Bate defeated TJP, Kalisto and Kenny Williams in a fatal four-way match. During day one of the second annual United Kingdom Championship Tournament on 18 June, Bate, Dunne and Seven (known in Europe as British Strong Style) defeated The Undisputed Era (Adam Cole, Kyle O'Reilly and Roderick Strong) in a six-man tag team match. The next day, Bate and Seven defeated O'Reilly and Strong to capture the NXT Tag Team Championship, but lost the titles back to O'Reilly and Strong on 11 July episode of NXT. At NXT Takeover: Brooklyn 4, Bate and Seven failed to regain the championships.

On the 2 January 2019 episode of NXT UK, Moustache Mountain defeated Gallus to advance to the finals to become the inaugural NXT UK Tag Team Champions. At NXT UK Takeover: Blackpool, Moustache Mountain lost to Grizzled Young Veterans in the finals. At NXT UK Takeover: Cardiff, Bate faced Walter for the WWE United Kingdom Championship, in which Bate was unsuccessful in regaining the title. At NXT UK TakeOver: Blackpool II, Bate defeated to Jordan Devlin. At Worlds Collide, Seven and Bate faced DIY (Johnny Gargano and Tommaso Ciampa) in a losing effort. After the match, both teams shook hands and hugged. On the May 20 episode of NXT UK, Bate defeated A-Kid to win the Heritage Cup Championship. He would retain the title against Jack Starz & Mark Coffey on the July 1 & 15 episodes of NXT UK respectively. On the October 28, 2021 episode of NXT UK, Bate lost the title to Noam Dar after Trent Seven inadvertently threw in the towel during an altercation with Pretty Deadly at ringside.

On the 9 December 2021 episode of NXT UK, Moustache Mountain defeated Pretty Deadly to win the NXT UK Tag Team Championship, making them the first team to win both the NXT and NXT UK Tag Team Championships. On the 2 June 2022 episode of NXT UK, they lost the tag titles to Ashton Smith and Oliver Carter in a triple threat match that also involved Die Familie (Teoman and Rohan Raja). On the 16 June 2022 episode of NXT UK, Seven attacked Bate by hitting him with a low blow from behind after making a fake retirement speech, thus turning heel for the first time in his WWE career and disbanding the Moustache Mountain.

==== Return to NXT (2022–2024) ====
Bate won his second NXT United Kingdom Championship on 7 July, beating Trent Seven in the finals of a tournament also featuring Oliver Carter, Charlie Dempsey, Wolfgang, Kenny Williams, Joe Coffey and Mark Andrews. He also appeared on NXT Heatwave on 16 August facing off with the NXT Champion Bron Breakker with the NXT United Kingdom Championship despite his title win not having aired yet. On 23 August episode of NXT 2.0, Bate was scheduled to a championship unification match at Worlds Collide on 4 September, where he lost to Breakker, ending his second reign at 60 days and was recognised as the final NXT United Kingdom Champion. Breakker went forward as the unified NXT Champion.

==== New Catch Republic; Los Americanos (2024–present) ====
Bate made his main roster debut on 5 January 2024 episode of SmackDown: New Year's Revolution as the mystery partner of Butch, taking on Pretty Deadly, whom they would defeat. On 19 January episode of SmackDown, Bate teamed with Butch, who returned to his previous ring name Pete Dunne, and the two defeated Pretty Deadly in a rematch. On 23 February episode of SmackDown, the duo of Bate and Dunne was renamed to New Catch Republic. New Catch Republic won the Undisputed WWE Tag Team Championship Contender Series for an Undisputed WWE Tag Team Championship match at Elimination Chamber: Perth, but failed to defeat The Judgment Day (Finn Bálor and Damian Priest) for the titles at the event. At Night 1 of WrestleMania XL, New Catch Republic participated in a six-pack tag team ladder match for the Undisputed WWE Tag Team Championship, but failed to win any of the tag titles. As part of the 2024 WWE Draft, New Catch Republic were drafted to the Raw brand. In July, Bate was reportedly sidelined for a torn pectoral muscle after he suffered an injury, putting the team on hiatus. Bate returned on the 31 March 2025, edition of Raw in London, England, teaming with Dunne in a losing effort against The New Day (Kofi Kingston and Xavier Woods)

On the 4 August 2025 episode of Raw, during the match between Dominik Mysterio and Dragon Lee, Bate and Dunne appeared as a decoy versions of El Grande Americano and cost Lee the match. On the 22 September episode of Raw, Bate and Dunne were given the names Bravo Americano and Rayo Americano, respectively as part of the Los Americanos stable.

== Professional wrestling style ==
Bate, despite his small stature, is renowned for his strength and power moves, often performing multiple delayed deadlift suplexes including bridging belly-to-back, bridging German and exploder variations. He has also been known to utilise an airplane spin and giant swing - occasionally on multiple opponents at the same time. This has earned him the nickname the Big Strong Boi. His finishing maneuver is a sitout double underhook powerbomb called the Tyler Driver '97.

== Personal life ==
Like his British Strong Style teammates Peter England (Pete Dunne) and Benjamin Webb (Trent Seven), Bate became a vegan after watching the 2014 documentary Cowspiracy.

== Other media ==
=== Video games ===
Tyler Bate in video games
Year	Title	Notes	Ref.
2018	WWE 2K19	Video game debut	
2019	WWE 2K20		
2022	WWE 2K22		
2023	WWE 2K23		
2024	WWE 2K24		
2025	WWE 2K25		
2026	WWE 2K26		

== Championships and accomplishments ==
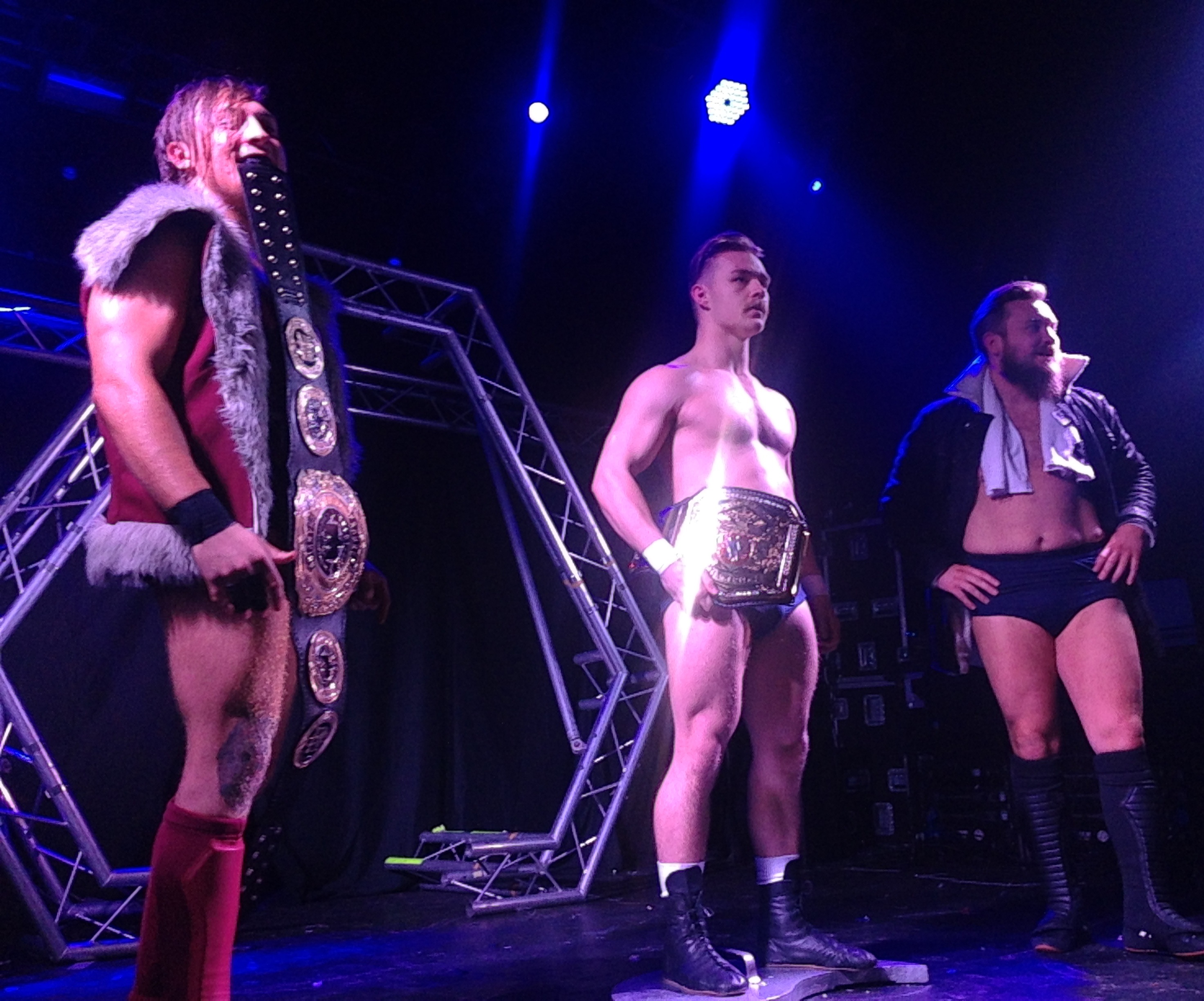
Bate (centre) holding the WWE United Kingdom Championship belt and standing on the Progress Tag Team Championship shield

- Attack! Pro Wrestling
  - Attack! 24:7 Championship (4 time)
  - Attack! Tag Team Championship (2 time) – with Super Santos Sr. (1) and Trent Seven (1)
- Chikara
  - Chikara Campeonatos de Parejas (1 time) – with Trent Seven
  - King of Trios (2017) – with Pete Dunne and Trent Seven
- ESPN
  - Ranked No. 28 of the 30 best Pro Wrestlers Under 30 in 2023
- Fight Club: Pro
  - FCP Tag Team Championship (2 times) – with Trent Seven
  - Dream Tag Team Invitational (2018) – with Trent Seven
- Great Bear Promotions
  - Junior Heavyweight Cup (2014)
  - URSA Major One Night Tournament (2013)
- International Wrestling Syndicate
  - IWS World Tag Team Championship (1 time) – with Trent Seven
- Kamikaze Pro
  - Kamikaze Pro Tag Team Championship (1 time) – with Dan Moloney
  - Relentless Division Championship (1 time)
- Over the Top Wrestling
  - OTT Tag Team Championship (1 time) – with Trent Seven
- Progress Wrestling
  - Progress Tag Team Championship (2 time) – with Trent Seven
- Pro Wrestling Illustrated
  - Ranked No. 50 of the top 500 singles wrestlers in the PWI 500 in 2017
- Revolution Pro Wrestling
  - RPW Undisputed British Tag Team Championship (1 time) – with Trent Seven
- Shropshire Wrestling Alliance
  - SWA British Lions Championship (1 time)
  - British Lions Tournament (2014)
- Westside Xtreme Wrestling (wXw)
  - wXw Shotgun Championship (1 time)
- WWE
  - NXT United Kingdom Championship (2 times, inaugural, final)
  - NXT UK Heritage Cup (1 time)
  - NXT Tag Team Championship (1 time) – with Trent Seven
  - NXT UK Tag Team Championship (1 time) – with Trent Seven
  - First (and only) NXT UK Triple Crown Champion
  - United Kingdom Championship Tournament (2017)
  - NXT Tag Team Championship Invitational (2018) – with Trent Seven
  - NXT United Kingdom Championship Tournament (2022)
  - Undisputed WWE Tag Team Championship Contender Series (2024) – with Pete Dunne
  - WWE Speed Championship #1 Contender Tournament (May 8–24, 2024)
  - NXT Tag Team Championship #1 Contender's Tournament (2026) – with Rayo Americano
  - NXT Year-End Award (1 time)
    - Match of the Year (2017) – vs Pete Dunne for the WWE United Kingdom Championship at NXT TakeOver: Chicago

== See also ==
- List of vegans
