= NXT UK =

Professional wrestling streaming television series

- Genre: Professional wrestling
- Created by: Vince McMahon; Paul "Triple H" Levesque
- Starring: NXT UK roster
- Opening theme: "Got That Feeling" by def rebel
- Country of origin: United Kingdom
- No. of seasons: 5
- No. of episodes: 215

Production
- Camera setup: Multicamera setup
- Running time: 60 minutes; ~160 minutes (NXT UK TakeOver specials)

Original release
- Network: WWE Network and Peacock (2018–2022) (Note: Episodes of NXT UK aired exclusively on Peacock's WWE Network channel in the United States.); BT Sport (2020–2022); Paramount Network/5Action (2020–2022)
- Release: 17 October 2018 – 1 September 2022

Related
- WWE Raw; WWE SmackDown; WWE Main Event; WWE NXT; WWE Evolve

WWE NXT UK, also known simply as NXT UK, is a professional wrestling television programme that was produced exclusively in the United Kingdom by the American promotion WWE. It aired from 17 October 2018 until 1 September 2022 on BT Sport and Paramount Network/5Action, while in the United States the show streamed on Peacock and in other countries on the WWE Network. The show featured competitors from WWE's local NXT UK roster.

WWE officially announced the show during the 2018 United Kingdom Championship Tournament, partly to combat the relaunch of World of Sport Wrestling. The final episode of the programme aired on 1 September 2022, following the announcement that the NXT UK brand would eventually be replaced by an expanded pan-European NXT Europe.

== History ==
In a press conference at The O2 Arena on 15 December 2016, Triple H revealed that there would be a 16-man tournament to crown the inaugural WWE United Kingdom Champion. The tournament was held over two days, 14 and 15 January 2017, and aired exclusively on the WWE Network. At the time, it was stated that the championship would be the centrepiece of a new UK-based show produced in the UK, but since the inaugural tournament, it was defended on NXT as well as at independent shows in the United Kingdom. The name of the show, NXT UK, and its premiere was finally revealed during the 2018 United Kingdom Championship Tournament. On 7 June 2018, Johnny Saint was appointed General Manager of WWE's United Kingdom-based brand, officially called NXT UK.

The show had its first tapings in August 2018, and the premiere episode of NXT UK aired on 17 October 2018. Starting October 31 with the third and fourth episodes, new episodes were premiered in a doubleheader format each week. On 12 January 2019, the first live special episode of NXT UK aired, called NXT UK TakeOver: Blackpool. Beginning with the 16 January episode, NXT UK returned to airing one episode each week. In September 2019, Triple H stated that NXT UK was the second most watched programme on the WWE Network, behind NXT. In October 2019, the show moved to Thursdays.

Beginning on 2 January 2020, NXT UK began airing on BT Sport. On 21 January 2020, it was announced that NXT UK will also be airing on Paramount Network (now known as 5Action). Due to the COVID-19 pandemic, NXT UK suspended production in April 2020. It returned to air in September 2020, with the programme's tapings moving to the BT Sport studios at the Here East media complex in London.

On 18 August 2022, WWE announced that the NXT UK brand would be entering a hiatus in September and would eventually be relaunched and rebranded as NXT Europe. The final episode of NXT UK aired on 1 September.

== Special episodes ==
Episode Title	Date	Venue	Location	Notes
NXT UK's debut episode	17 October 2018	Cambridge Corn Exchange	Cambridge, England	Premier episode of the programme. Featured Pete Dunne (c) vs. Noam Dar for the WWE United Kingdom Championship
NXT UK episode 31	20 February 2019	Phoenix Convention Center	Phoenix, Arizona	First episode of NXT UK held outside the United Kingdom and in the United States. Featured Toni Storm (c) vs. Rhea Ripley for the NXT UK Women's Championship
Best of NXT UK 2019	26 December 2019	N/A	N/A	Recap episode featuring all of the year's events on NXT UK.
Rise of NXT UK	9 April 2020	N/A	N/A	From April 2020 until September 2020, NXT UK was produced as a clip show due to the COVID-19 pandemic.
Superstar Picks; Week 1	16 April 2020	N/A	N/A	From April 2020 until September 2020, NXT UK was produced as a clip show due to the COVID-19 pandemic.
NXT UK's Most Brilliant; Week 1	23 April 2020	N/A	N/A	From April 2020 until September 2020, NXT UK was produced as a clip show due to the COVID-19 pandemic.
Hidden Gems; Week 1	30 April 2020	N/A	N/A	From April 2020 until September 2020, NXT UK was produced as a clip show due to the COVID-19 pandemic.
Imperium Dominates	7 May 2020	N/A	N/A	From April 2020 until September 2020, NXT UK was produced as a clip show due to the COVID-19 pandemic.
Superstar Picks; Week 2	14 May 2020	N/A	N/A	From April 2020 until September 2020, NXT UK was produced as a clip show due to the COVID-19 pandemic.
NXT UK's Most Brilliant; Week 2	21 May 2020	N/A	N/A	From April 2020 until September 2020, NXT UK was produced as a clip show due to the COVID-19 pandemic.
Hidden Gems; Week 2	28 May 2020	N/A	N/A	From April 2020 until September 2020, NXT UK was produced as a clip show due to the COVID-19 pandemic.
Gallus Boys On Top	4 June 2020	N/A	N/A	From April 2020 until September 2020, NXT UK was produced as a clip show due to the COVID-19 pandemic.
Superstar Picks; Week 3	11 June 2020	N/A	N/A	From April 2020 until September 2020, NXT UK was produced as a clip show due to the COVID-19 pandemic.
NXT UK's Most Brilliant; Week 3	18 June 2020	N/A	N/A	From April 2020 until September 2020, NXT UK was produced as a clip show due to the COVID-19 pandemic.
Superstar Picks; Week 4	25 June 2020	N/A	N/A	From April 2020 until September 2020, NXT UK was produced as a clip show due to the COVID-19 pandemic.
Superstar Picks; Week 5	2 July 2020	N/A	N/A	From April 2020 until September 2020, NXT UK was produced as a clip show due to the COVID-19 pandemic.
Superstar Picks; Week 6	9 July 2020	N/A	N/A	From April 2020 until September 2020, NXT UK was produced as a clip show due to the COVID-19 pandemic.
NXT UK's Greatest Hits; Week 1	16 July 2020	N/A	N/A	From April 2020 until September 2020, NXT UK was produced as a clip show due to the COVID-19 pandemic.
NXT UK's Greatest Hits; Week 2	23 July 2020	N/A	N/A	From April 2020 until September 2020, NXT UK was produced as a clip show due to the COVID-19 pandemic.
NXT UK's Greatest Hits; Week 3	30 July 2020	N/A	N/A	From April 2020 until September 2020, NXT UK was produced as a clip show due to the COVID-19 pandemic.
NXT UK's Greatest Hits; Week 4	6 August 2020	N/A	N/A	From April 2020 until September 2020, NXT UK was produced as a clip show due to the COVID-19 pandemic.
Hidden Gems; Week 3	13 August 2020	N/A	N/A	From April 2020 until September 2020, NXT UK was produced as a clip show due to the COVID-19 pandemic.
Superstar Picks; Week 7	20 August 2020	N/A	N/A	From April 2020 until September 2020, NXT UK was produced as a clip show due to the COVID-19 pandemic.
Superstar Picks; Week 8	27 August 2020	N/A	N/A	From April 2020 until September 2020, NXT UK was produced as a clip show due to the COVID-19 pandemic.
The Champion And His Challenger	3 September 2020	N/A	N/A	From April 2020 until September 2020, NXT UK was produced as a clip show due to the COVID-19 pandemic.
History In The Making	10 September 2020	N/A	N/A	From April 2020 until September 2020, NXT UK was produced as a clip show due to the COVID-19 pandemic.
NXT episode 113	17 September 2020	BT Sport Studios	London, England	First episode of NXT UK after the conclusion of the COVID-19 pandemic clip show format. Start of NXT UK's residency at BT Sport Studios.
NXT UK Happy Holidays	24 December 2020	BT Sport Studios	London, England	Christmas Eve special episode. Recapped all of the year's events on NXT UK.
NXT UK Happy New Year	31 December 2020	BT Sport Studios	London, England	New Year's special episode. Recapped all of the year's events on NXT UK.
NXT UK: Prelude	8 April 2021	BT Sport Studios	London, England	WrestleMania Week special episode. Featured Walter (c) vs. Rampage Brown for the NXT United Kingdom Championship
NXT UK Happy Holidays	23 December 2021	BT Sport Studios	London, England	Christmas Eve special episode. Recapped all of the year's events on NXT UK.
NXT UK Happy New Year	30 December 2021	BT Sport Studios	London, England	New Year's special episode. Recapped all of the year's events on NXT UK.
NXT UK's final episode	1 September 2022	BT Sport Studios	London, England	Final episode of NXT UK; Featured Tyler Bate vs. Trent Seven in the finals of the NXT United Kingdom Championship tournament

== On-air personalities ==
=== Authority figures ===
Authority figure	Position	Date started	Date finished	Notes
Johnny Saint	General Manager	7 June 2018	4 September 2022 (Note: While NXT UK aired its final episode on 1 September 2022, Saint remained the general manager of the NXT UK brand until it entered a hiatus on 4 September.)	Was appointed General Manager of the NXT UK brand by Triple H at the 2018 United Kingdom Championship Tournament
Sid Scala	Assistant to the General Manager	12 December 2018	1 September 2022 (Note: Scala was released by WWE on 19 August 2022, but due to episodes of NXT UK airing on tape delay, he appeared through the final episode on 1 September.)	

=== Commentators ===
Commentators	Date started	Date finished
Vic Joseph and Nigel McGuinness	17 October 2018	12 June 2019
Vic Joseph and Nigel McGuinness	31 July 2019	3 October 2019
Vic Joseph and Aiden English	19 June 2019	24 July 2019
Tom Phillips and Nigel McGuinness	10 October 2019	16 January 2020
Tom Phillips and Aiden English	23 January 2020	5 March 2020
Andy Shepherd and Nigel McGuinness	12 March 2020	June 2020
Andy Shepherd and Nigel McGuinness	17 September 2020	1 September 2022

=== Ring announcers ===
Ring announcer	Date started	Date finished
Andy Shepherd	17 October 2018	5 March 2020
Greg Hamilton	13 February 2019	20 February 2019
Sarah Schreiber	20 February 2019	27 February 2019
Francesca Brown	12 March 2020	10 March 2022
Kirsty Bosley	14 October 2021	1 September 2022

=== Backstage interviewers ===
Backstage interviewer	Date started	Date finished
Radzi Chinyanganya	17 October 2018	23 April 2020
Josiah Williams	12 March 2020	2 April 2020

== See also ==
- Professional wrestling in the United Kingdom
