= Andy Shepherd =

British sports broadcaster

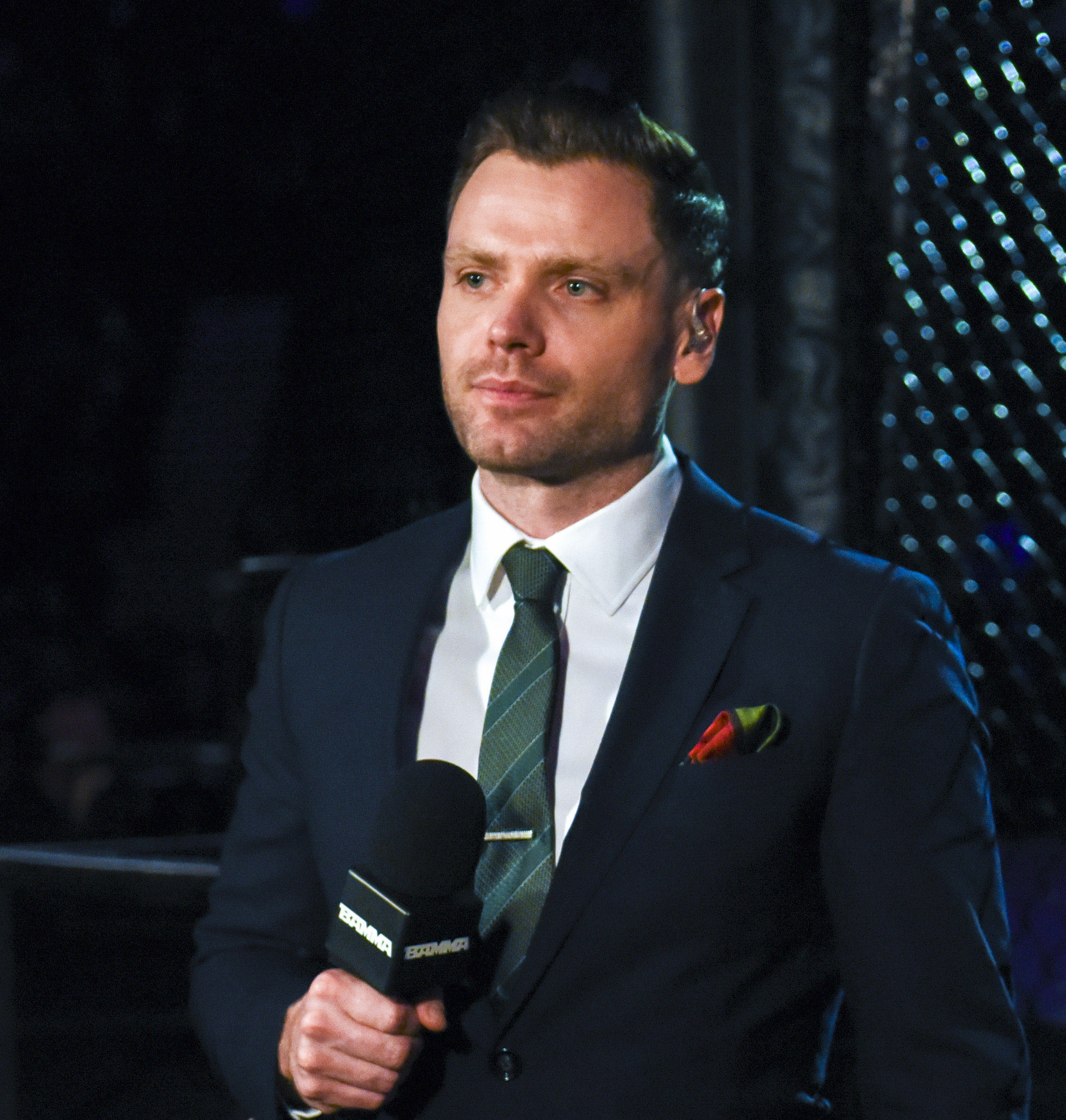
- Shepherd hosting BAMMA 33 in Newcastle, 15 December 2017

Personal information
- Born: Andrew Shepherd; 1988 (age 37–38) Leicester, England

Professional wrestling career
- Ring name: Andy Shepherd
- Debut: 2017

Andrew Shepherd is an English sports broadcaster, professional wrestling commentator, presenter, producer and writer. He is best known for his time in WWE where he served as the play-by-play commentator and former ring announcer on NXT UK.

Shepherd was a national level athlete, representing Leicestershire at the English Schools Athletics Championships for the 100m.

He has worked behind the camera, producing TV shows for Fulwell 73 and Big Talk Productions.

In 2013, Shepherd was selected from over 2,000 applicants to be one of 10 shortlisted presenters to ‘compete’ to be the next Blue Peter presenter on the CBBC show Blue Peter - You Decide!

He is now known in-front of the camera for his work on UKTV's Dave, fronting their coverage of David Haye's comeback fights and Red Bull Cliff Diving World Series as well as Channel 5's BAMMA coverage. 2017 saw Shepherd begin working with WWE (World Wrestling Entertainment) as part of their broadcast team for the WWE United Kingdom Championship Tournament. In April 2017, BAMMA announced a new television deal moving their shows to Dave, with Shepherd and David Haye fronting the coverage. In June 2018 Shepherd returned to be the ring announcer for the two night WWE United Kingdom Championship Tournament (2018). The day after the tournament, it was announced that a WWE United Kingdom brand would launch, NXT UK, which had its first television taping the following month, in which Shepherd once again serves as ring announcer and has done since until the 5 March 2020 episode.

On 12 March 2020 Shepherd was promoted to play-by-play commentator on NXT UK, replacing Tom Phillips joining the NXT UK commentary alongside Nigel McGuinness.

In September 2020 Shepherd hosted Bellator MMA's Euro Series 8 and 9 broadcasts from Milan, Italy. He had previously fronted their Bellator 200 broadcast for Channel 5.

In November 2022 Shepherd was a ringside broadcast host during Floyd Mayweather Jr. vs. Deji.

He was the host (or presentator) during WWE's Euro tour in October/November 2022.

Andy debuted for MMA organisation PFL in August 2022 as cage announcer and has continued to work for the organisation across their Global, Europe, MENA and PPV brands as a cage announcer, play-by-play commentator and presenter through the 2023 and 2024 Seasons. These shows are broadcast on ESPN in the States and DAZN globally.

Preceded by Tom Phillips	NXT UK lead announcer 2020–2022	Succeeded by Final
