= Drilla Moloney =

English professional wrestler (born 1997)

- Moloney in August 2026

Personal information
- Born: Daniel Joseph Moloney; February 9, 1997 (age 29) Birmingham, West Midlands, England

Professional wrestling career
- Ring name(s): Drilla Moloney; Dan Moloney; Daniel Moloney; Super Santos Sr. Los Federales Santos Sr.
- Billed height: 178 cm (5 ft 10 in)
- Billed weight: 100 kg (220 lb)
- Trained by: Jim Hunter; Lee Hunter
- Debut: 2013

Daniel Joseph Moloney (born February 9, 1997) is an English professional wrestler and actor. He is signed to New Japan Pro-Wrestling (NJPW), where he performs under the ring name Drilla Moloney (Note: When wrestling in Japan, his ring name is written in katakana as ドリラ・モロニー (Dorira Moronī).) and is a member of the Unbound Co. stable. He is a former two-time IWGP Junior Heavyweight Tag Team Champion with Clark Connors as part of Bullet Club War Dogs. He also makes sporadic appearances on the British independent circuit–primarily for Progress Wrestling and Revolution Pro Wrestling (RevPro).

== Professional wrestling career ==
=== Early career (2013–2017) ===
Moloney made his professional wrestling debut in 2013, mainly wrestling on the British independent scene.

=== WWE (2017–2021) ===
Moloney made his debut in WWE on the NXT UK brand, while taking part in the inaugural United Kingdom Championship Tournament. He wrestled his first match on the first night of the tournament from January 14, 2017, where he fell short to Mark Andrews in the first rounds. On the second night of the tournament from January 15, Moloney teamed up with Nathan Cruz in a losing effort against Saxon Huxley and Tucker. He continued to make sporadic appearances on NXT UK, competing in various live shows such as the WWE United Kingdom Championship Special show from May 7, 2017, where he teamed up with Rich Swann in a losing effort against The Brian Kendrick and TJP. Moloney often teamed up with his indie tag team partner Man Like DeReiss in various events of the brand, such as the NXT UK #83 episode from March 6, 2020, where they fell short to Pretty Deadly (Lewis Howley and Sam Stoker).

Moloney's final appearances for NXT UK occurred in 2021 where he teamed with Andy Wild in losing efforts to Symbiosis in June and Jack Starz and Dave Mastiff in September.

=== Progress Wrestling (2018–present) ===
Moloney made his debut in Progress Wrestling at PROGRESS Chapter 80: Gods And Monsters on December 8, 2018, where he unsuccessfully challenged Trent Seven for the Progress Atlas Championship.

He competed in various event gimmicks, such as at PROGRESS Chapter 89: 26th May 1988, a comedic event which took place on May 26, 2019, where he wrestled under the name of "The Teflon Sheik" and fell short to Mark Davis who portraited "Wally Handford". At PROGRESS Chapter 90 on June 30, 2019, Moloney teamed up with Trent Seven in a losing effort against Latin American Xchange (Santana and Ortiz). At PROGRESS Chapter 95: Still Chasing on September 15, 2019, Moloney took part into a rumble match to determine the inaugural Progress Proteus Championship, bout won by Paul Robinson which also involved various wrestlers such as Chris Brookes, Ilja Dragunov, Travis Banks, Eddie Kingston, Millie McKenzie, Jonathan Gresham, Spike Trivet, Charli Evans and many others.

Moloney won his first title on Progress Wrestling, the PROGRESS Tag Team Championship alongside his "The 0121" tag team partner Man Like DeReiss at PROGRESS Chapter 131: 10th Anniversary Show on March 25, 2022, by defeating the previous champions Smokin' Aces (Charlie Sterling and Nick Riley) in a five-way tag team match also involving Lykos Gym (Kid Lykos and Kid Lykos II), Sunshine Machine (Chuck Mambo and TK Cooper), and North West Strong (Chris Ridgeway and Luke Jacobs). At PROGRESS Chapter 139 Warriors Come Out To Play on August 28, 2022, Moloney unsuccessfully challenged Big Damo for the PROGRESS World Championship.

=== Revolution Pro Wrestling (2019–2023; 2026–present) ===
Moloney made his first appearance for Revolution Pro Wrestling (RevPro) at RevPro Live At The Cockpit 43 on July 7, 2019, where he teamed up with MK McKinnan to defeat Dan Magee and Kurtis Chapman.

At RevPro Lethal Weapon on March 8, 2020, Moloney teamed up with Robbie X, falling short to Bullet Club's El Phantasmo and Hikuleo. At PROGRESS Chapter 104 on February 20, 2021, he unsuccessfully challenged Cara Noir for the PROGRESS World Championship. At RevPro High Stakes 2021 on September 19, Moloney unsuccessfully faced Shota Umino.

On March 26, 2023 at Revolution Rumble, a show promoted by Revolution Pro Wrestling, Moloney defeated Francesco Akira in singles competition. After the bout concluded, Will Ospreay offered Moloney a spot in the United Empire stable which Moloney accepted.

Moloney made his return to RevPro after three years on April 5, 2026 at RevPro London 106, where he confronted Ricky Knight Jr.. a

=== New Japan Pro-Wrestling (2023–present) ===
==== Bullet Club War Dogs (2023–2026) ====
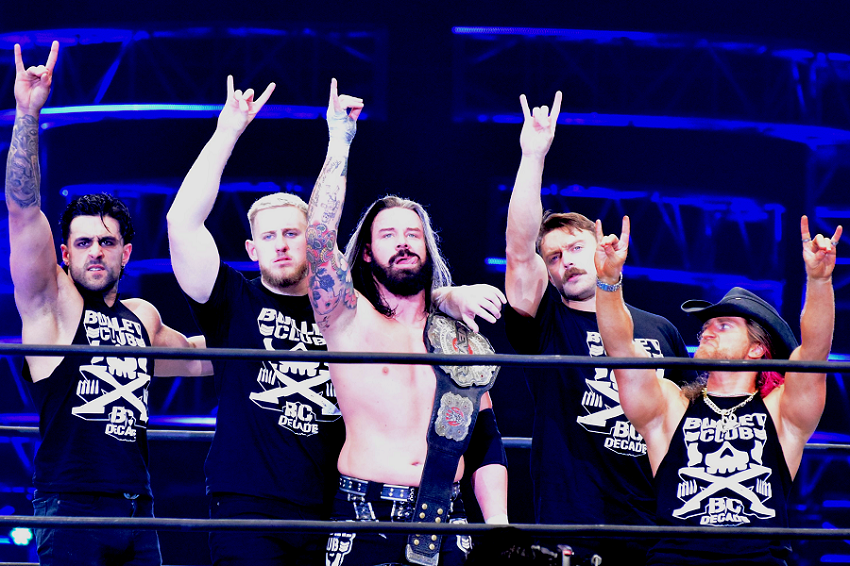
Moloney (far left) with other members of the War Dogs sub-group in June 2023

On April 27, 2023, Moloney was announced as an entrant in New Japan Pro-Wrestling's Best of the Super Juniors 30 tournament, competing in the B Block. Moloney finished the tournament with 8 points, failing to advance to the semi-finals. On June 4 at Dominion, Moloney betrayed United Empire after attacking Francesco Akira and TJP alongside Clark Connors, following the duo's IWGP Junior Heavyweight Tag Team Championship match and joined Bullet Club. On July 4 on Night 1 of NJPW Independence Day, Moloney (now going by Drilla Moloney) and Connors defeated Catch 2/2 to win the IWGP Junior Heavyweight Tag Team Championships, marking both men’s first NJPW championships.

The following night, the duo made their first title defence, defeating Chaos (Rocky Romero and Yoh). The duo made another successful title defence at Destruction in Ryōgoku on October 9, defeating Intergalactic Jet Setters (Kushida and Kevin Knight). 5 days later, the duo made another successful defence against Leon Slater and Cameron Khai, at Royal Quest III. Later in the month, Moloney and Connors entered the Super Junior Tag League. The duo finished their tournament campaign with 10 points, failing to advance to the finals. Following the tournament final, the duo attacked tournament winners Catch 2/2, ahead of their scheduled title defence against the duo at Wrestle Kingdom 18. Ahead of the match at Wrestle Kingdom, the two teams faced off in NJPW's first ever coffin match, which was won by Bullet Club, after they locked TJP in the coffin. At the event, Akira and TJP defeated Connors and Moloney, ending the duo's reign at 184 days, only to regain them a month later. The duo dropped the titles to Intergalactic Jet Setters in October at King of Pro-Wrestling. At Wrestle Kingdom 19, they failed to win the titles back in a four-way ladder match.

On January 6, 2025 at New Year Dash!!, Moloney announced that he would be joining the heavyweight division. On February 11 at The New Beginning in Osaka, Moloney wrestled his first match as a heavyweight, defeating Shingo Takagi. Moloney then participated in the New Japan Cup, defeating Tomohiro Ishii in the first round, TJP in the second round, but was eliminated by Takagi in a rematch in the quarter-finals. In April, Moloney began feuding with Sanada, after the latter turned on the War Dogs to join House of Torture amid a war between the two factions over the Bullet Club leadership, that culminated in a dog pound match during the first night of Wrestling Dontaku 2025. From July to August, Moloney competed in his first G1 Climax tournament, where he was placed in B-Block. He finished with 8 points and failed to advance to the playoff stage. At King of Pro-Wrestling Moloney defeated Sanada to end their feud; after the event the War Dogs turned face by forming an alliance with Unaffiliated (Takagi, Yota Tsuji and Hiromu Takahashi), with Moloney forming a tag team with former rival Takagi, billed as the "War Dragons". The War Dragons entered the World Tag League, where they finished with eight points in the block stage and failed to advance with to the semi-finals.

==== Unbound Co. (2026–present) ====
After Wrestle Kingdom 20, at New Year Dash!!, David Finlay and Yota Tsuji announced the dissolution of Bullet Club and Mushozoku, replacing the alliance with Unbound Company, which was a complete merger. On February 11, 2026 at The New Beginning in Osaka, the War Dragons defeated Great-O-Khan and Henare. After the match, Moloney announced that he had re-signed with NJPW. In March, Moloney received a first-round bye in the New Japan Cup, but was eliminated by Yuya Uemura. From July 11 to August 16, Moloney competed in the G1 Climax (B block) and finished with 10 points (5–4), failing qualify for the semis. During the tournament, Moloney was able to score a victory over his former stablemate and the reigning IWGP Global Heavyweight Champion Gabe Kidd. On 27 September at Destruction in Kobe, Moloney failed to win the title from Kidd.

=== All Elite Wrestling (2025) ===
Moloney made his All Elite Wrestling (AEW) debut on the August 20, 2025 episode of Dynamite, where he and Bullet Club War Dogs stablemates Clark Connors and Robbie X attempted to assist the Death Riders (Claudio Castagnoli, Jon Moxley, and Wheeler Yuta) in their match against Hiroshi Tanahashi and JetSpeed (Kevin Knight and "Speedball" Mike Bailey), but were fended off by The Opps (Katsuyori Shibata, Powerhouse Hobbs, and Samoa Joe). On August 24 at Forbidden Door Zero Hour, the Bullet Club War Dogs unsuccessfully challenged The Opps for the AEW World Trios Championship.

== Other media ==
=== Television ===
In 2022, Moloney played the role of Si in the British sitcom Deep Heat, broadcast on ITV2 where he worked with comedy actress Pippa Haywood and Sex Education actor Alistair Petrie. Moloney said he struggled with scripts due to him suffering from dyslexia.

== Championships and accomplishments ==
- ATTACK! Pro Wrestling
  - ATTACK! 24:7 Championship (1 time)
  - ATTACK! Tag Team Champioship (3 times) – with Elephant Mask (1 time) and Man Like DeReiss (2 times)
- Fight Club: PRO
  - FCP Championship (1 time)
- Kamikaze Pro
  - Kamikaze Pro Tag Team Championship (1 time) – with Tyler Bate
  - Relentless Division Championship (1 time)
- Knockout Wrestling
  - KOW Heavyweight Championship (1 time)
- New Japan Pro-Wrestling
  - IWGP Junior Heavyweight Tag Team Championship (2 times) – with Clark Connors
- Pro Wrestling Illustrated
  - Ranked No. 159 of the top 500 singles wrestlers in the PWI 500 in 2026
- Progress Wrestling
  - PROGRESS Tag Team Championship (2 time) – with Man Like DeReiss
- Southside Wrestling Entertainment
  - SWE World Heavyweight Championship (1 time)
  - Southside Wrestling Cup (2018)
- TNT Extreme Wrestling
  - TNT World Championship (1 time)
- Wrestlefest DXB
  - Dubai World Championship (1 time)
- Wrestling For
  - Wrestling For Championship (1 time)
