= WWE United Kingdom Championship Tournament =

WWE Network event series

- WWE United Kingdom Championship Tournament logo since 2017
- Promotions: WWE
- Brands: NXT UK (2017–2018); NXT (2018)
- First event: 2017
- Last event: 2018

The WWE United Kingdom Championship Tournament was a professional wrestling tournament and WWE Network event produced by WWE, an American-based professional wrestling promotion. The event was established in December 2016, debuting as a WWE Network-exclusive event on 14 and 15 January 2017. The second event was held on 18 and 19 June 2018 and aired on 25 and 26 June. The first event was held for WWE's new United Kingdom division, while the second event featured wrestlers from their American-based NXT and United Kingdom-based NXT UK brand divisions.

The event was centered around the WWE United Kingdom Championship, which had been established in December 2016. The first event determined the inaugural holder of the championship while the winner of the second event received a match for the championship. The inaugural event was the genesis to the formation of WWE's NXT UK brand, a sister brand of NXT based in the United Kingdom; the 2018 tournament was NXT UK's first official event. The championship itself was later renamed as the NXT United Kingdom Championship.

== History ==
In a press conference at The O2 Arena on 15 December 2016, Triple H, the chief operating officer and head of NXT for the American professional wrestling promotion WWE, revealed that there would be a 16-man tournament to crown the inaugural WWE United Kingdom Champion. The tournament was held over a two-day period, 14 and 15 January 2017, at the Empress Ballroom in Blackpool, Lancashire, England and aired exclusively on the WWE Network. The tournament featured wrestlers from WWE's upstart United Kingdom division. The tournament was won by Tyler Bate, thus becoming the inaugural WWE United Kingdom Champion.

A follow-up to the first event called the United Kingdom Championship Special aired on May 19. On 7 April 2018, a second United Kingdom Championship Tournament event was scheduled for 18 and 19 June at the Royal Albert Hall in Kensington, London, England and to air on the WWE Network on 25 and 26 June. This tournament featured wrestlers from WWE's new United Kingdom based-brand, NXT UK, as well as wrestlers from WWE's American-based NXT. The full tournament was held on day one while the second day was promoted as "NXT U.K. Championship." Zack Gibson won the second tournament and received a WWE United Kingdom Championship match against reigning champion Pete Dunne during the main event of the second night, where Dunne retained.

Following the second tournament, the WWE United Kingdom Championship became the top championship of the NXT UK brand and its show, NXT UK, a WWE Network show produced in the United Kingdom that premiered on 17 October 2018. In January 2020, the title was renamed to NXT United Kingdom Championship to reflect its status as the top title of NXT UK.

== Events ==
#	Event	Date	City	Venue	Main event	Ref.
1	United Kingdom Championship Tournament (2017)	14 January 2017	Blackpool, Lancashire, England	Empress Ballroom	Tyler Bate vs. Tucker	
1	United Kingdom Championship Tournament (2017)	15 January 2017	Blackpool, Lancashire, England	Empress Ballroom	Tyler Bate vs. Pete Dunne for the inaugural WWE United Kingdom Championship	
2	United Kingdom Championship Tournament (2018)	18 June 2018 (aired 25 June)	Kensington, London, England	Royal Albert Hall	Zack Gibson vs Travis Banks to determine the #1 contender for the WWE United Kingdom Championship on Night 2	
2	United Kingdom Championship Tournament (2018)	19 June 2018 (aired 26 June)	Kensington, London, England	Royal Albert Hall	Pete Dunne (c) vs. Zack Gibson for the WWE United Kingdom Championship	
(c) – refers to the champion(s) heading into the match
