= WWE United Kingdom Championship Special =

2017 WWE Network event

United Kingdom Championship Special
- Promotion: WWE
- Brand: United Kingdom
- Date: May 7, 2017 (aired May 19, 2017)
- City: Norwich, Norfolk, England
- Venue: Epic Studios

WWE event chronology
← Previous; Payback	Next → NXT TakeOver: Chicago

WWE in Europe chronology
← Previous; United Kingdom Championship Tournament (2017)	Next → United Kingdom Championship Tournament (2018)

The United Kingdom Championship Special was a professional wrestling streaming event produced by the American promotion WWE. The event was filmed on May 7, 2017, and aired on May 19 exclusively on the WWE Network at 8:00 p.m. British Summer Time (3:00 p.m. Eastern Time). The event was held at Epic Studios in Norwich, Norfolk, England and featured the participation of competitors from WWE's United Kingdom division and the 205 Live program.

== Background ==
On December 15, 2016, at The O2 Arena, executive and part-time wrestler Paul "Triple H" Levesque of the American professional wrestling company WWE announced that the following month, the promotion would crown its inaugural WWE United Kingdom Champion. A tournament to crown the inaugural champion occurred as the United Kingdom Championship Tournament event, which took place over two days on January 14–15, 2017. The tournament and championship were won by Tyler Bate, who at the time became the youngest wrestler to hold a WWE singles championship at 19 years old.

On May 15, 2017, a follow-up to the UK Championship tournament was announced by WWE, titled the "United Kingdom Championship Special". Jim Ross and Nigel McGuinness were announced as the commentators for the event. The event was filmed on May 7 and aired on tape delay on May 19 exclusively on the WWE Network at 8:00 p.m. British Summer Time (3:00 p.m. Eastern Time). It was held at Epic Studios in Norwich, Norfolk, England and featured the participation of the competitors from WWE's United Kingdom division and the 205 Live program.

== Results ==
No.	Results	Stipulations	Times
1	Wolfgang defeated Joseph Conners	Singles match	11:00
2	The Brian Kendrick and TJP defeated Dan Moloney and Rich Swann	Tag team match	11:30
3	Pete Dunne defeated Trent Seven	Singles match to determine the #1 contender for the WWE United Kingdom Championship	15:55
4	Tyler Bate (c) defeated Mark Andrews	Singles match for the WWE United Kingdom Championship	24:20
(c) / – the champion(s) heading into the match

== See also ==
- Professional wrestling in the United Kingdom
