= United Kingdom Championship Tournament (2018) =

WWE Network event

- Promotional poster featuring various WWE wrestlers
- Promotion: WWE
- Brand(s): NXT UK; NXT
- Date: June 18–19, 2018 (aired June 25–26, 2018)
- City: Kensington, London, England
- Venue: Royal Albert Hall

WWE event chronology
← Previous; Money in the Bank	Next → Extreme Rules

United Kingdom Championship Tournament chronology
← Previous; 2017	Next → Final

WWE in Europe chronology
← Previous; United Kingdom Championship Special	Next → NXT UK TakeOver: Blackpool

The 2018 United Kingdom Championship Tournament was a two-day professional wrestling streaming event and tournament promoted by the American promotion WWE, held for wrestlers from the developmental brands, NXT UK and NXT—the first event to officially promote NXT UK. The event was filmed on June 18 and 19, 2018, and aired on tape delay on June 25 and 26, exclusively on the WWE Network at 8:00 p.m. British Summer Time (3:00 p.m. Eastern Time). It was held at the Royal Albert Hall in Kensington, London, England.

Day one of the event featured the second United Kingdom Championship Tournament, which was won by Zack Gibson. Day two (promoted as NXT U.K. Championship) saw Zack Gibson unsuccessfully challenge WWE United Kingdom Champion Pete Dunne. NXT's North American, Women's, and Tag Team championships were also defended on day two. NXT UK's Women's and Tag Team championships were introduced during the event.

== Background ==
=== Production ===
On January 14 and 15, 2017, the American professional wrestling promotion WWE held its first United Kingdom Championship Tournament event. The tournament crowned the inaugural holder of the WWE United Kingdom Championship, which was won by Tyler Bate. A follow-up to the event called the United Kingdom Championship Special aired on May 19 that year. On April 7, 2018, a second United Kingdom Championship Tournament event was scheduled for June 18 and 19 at the Royal Albert Hall in Kensington, London, England and to air on June 25 and 26, exclusively on the WWE Network at 8:00 p.m. British Summer Time (3:00 p.m. Eastern Time). In addition to featuring wrestlers from WWE's new NXT UK brand, the tournament also featured wrestlers from the American-based NXT.

On May 25, 2018, Shawn Michaels and Triple H were scheduled to make appearances at the event. On June 7, Johnny Saint was announced as the General Manager of WWE's United Kingdom-based brand, officially named NXT UK. A United Kingdom Championship Tournament: Bracketology special aired on the WWE Network later that day, with appearances from all 16 tournament competitors.

=== Storylines ===
The card included matches that resulted from scripted storylines, where wrestlers portrayed villains, heroes, or less distinguishable characters in scripted events that built tension and culminated in a wrestling match or series of matches, with results predetermined by WWE's writers. Storylines were produced on the NXT television program.

On April 28, 2018, it was announced that British Strong Style (Pete Dunne, Trent Seven, and Tyler Bate) would face The Undisputed Era (Adam Cole, Kyle O'Reilly, and Roderick Strong) in a six-man tag team match on the June 18 event.

On May 14, WWE revealed details about the second United Kingdom Championship tournament, scheduling the first round matches for the 2018 Download Festival from June 8–10 and succeeding rounds for the United Kingdom Championship Tournament event on June 18. The winner of the tournament will receive a United Kingdom Championship match with Pete Dunne on the following day. On May 16, the first 8 competitors of the 16-man tournament were officially announced on WWE.com. The first 8 revealed were Zack Gibson, Joe Coffey, Gentleman Jack Gallagher, Dave Mastiff, Kenny Williams, Ligero, Joseph Conners, and Amir Jordan. On May 18, the remaining 8 competitors were announced.

On May 23, it was announced that Aleister Black and Ricochet would face EC3 and Velveteen Dream in a tag team match on the June 19 event.

On May 25, a fatal four-way match between Isla Dawn, Jinny, Killer Kelly and Toni Storm was announced for the June 18 event. The winner of the match will receive a NXT Women's Championship match with Shayna Baszler on the following day.

On June 18, it was announced that Adam Cole would defend his NXT North American Championship against Wolfgang the following day.

On June 18, it was announced that The Undisputed Era (Kyle O'Reilly and Roderick Strong) would defend their NXT Tag Team Championship against Moustache Mountain (Tyler Bate and Trent Seven) the following day.

== Participants ==
Wrestler	Hometown	Weight (lb)	Ref
Travis Banks	Auckland, New Zealand	190	
Joe Coffey	Glasgow, Scotland	240	
Joseph Conners	Nottingham, England	190	
Jordan Devlin	(Republic of Ireland) Bray, County Wicklow, Ireland	180	
James Drake	Blackpool, England	181	
Gentleman Jack Gallagher	Manchester, England	167	
Zack Gibson	Liverpool, England	220	
Drew Gulak	(United States) Philadelphia, Pennsylvania	193	
Amir Jordan	Dewsbury, England	185	
Ligero	Leeds, England	160	
Dave Mastiff	The Black Country, England	322	
Ashton Smith	Manchester, England	193	
Tyson T-Bone	Malvern, England	245	
Tucker	Belfast, Northern Ireland	191	
Flash Morgan Webster	Brynmawr, Wales	160	
Kenny Williams	Glasgow, Scotland	180	

== Tournament bracket ==
1st Round; NXT; May 10, 2018 (Aired: June 13, 2018); Download Festival; June 8–9, 2018
Zack Gibson	Submission
Amir Jordan	9:29
Drew Gulak	6:32
Gentleman Jack Gallagher	Pinfall
Flash Morgan Webster	Pinfall
James Drake	7:57
Tyson T-Bone	5:52
Jordan Devlin	Pinfall
Tucker	7:01
Joe Coffey	Pinfall
Dave Mastiff	Pinfall
Kenny Williams	5:51
Ligero	5:11
Travis Banks	Pinfall
Ashton Smith	Pinfall
Joseph Conners	9:46

Quarterfinals; United Kingdom Championship Tournament; June 18, 2018 (Aired: June 25)
Zack Gibson	Submission
Gentleman Jack Gallagher	13:37
Flash Morgan Webster	Pinfall
Jordan Devlin	7:10
Joe Coffey	Pinfall
Dave Mastiff	7:35
Travis Banks	Pinfall
Ashton Smith	6:25

Semifinals; United Kingdom Championship Tournament; June 18, 2018 (Aired: June 25)
Zack Gibson	Submission
Flash Morgan Webster	4:30
Joe Coffey	9:30
Travis Banks	Pinfall

Final; United Kingdom Championship Tournament; June 18, 2018 (Aired: June 25)
Zack Gibson	Submission
Travis Banks	17:05

== Results ==
=== United Kingdom Championship Tournament (June 18) ===
No.	Results	Stipulations
1^{D}	Amir Jordan defeated Joseph Conners	Singles match
2	Zack Gibson defeated Gentleman Jack Gallagher by submission	WWE United Kingdom Championship tournament quarterfinal match
3	Joe Coffey defeated Dave Mastiff	WWE United Kingdom Championship tournament quarterfinal match
4	Flash Morgan Webster defeated Jordan Devlin	WWE United Kingdom Championship tournament quarterfinal match
5	Travis Banks defeated Ashton Smith	WWE United Kingdom Championship tournament quarterfinal match
6	Toni Storm defeated Killer Kelly and Isla Dawn (Note: This match was originally a fatal four-way match also involving Jinny, but she was injured in the match and subsequently the match was made into a triple threat match.)	Triple threat match to determine the #1 contender for the NXT Women's Championship
7	Zack Gibson defeated Flash Morgan Webster by submission	WWE United Kingdom Championship tournament semifinal match
8	Travis Banks defeated Joe Coffey	WWE United Kingdom Championship tournament semifinal match
9	British Strong Style (Pete Dunne, Trent Seven and Tyler Bate) defeated The Undisputed Era (Adam Cole, Kyle O'Reilly and Roderick Strong)	Six-man tag team match
10	Zack Gibson defeated Travis Banks by submission	Tournament final to determine the #1 contender to the WWE United Kingdom Championship
D / – this was a dark match

=== NXT U.K. Championship (June 19) ===
Logo of the NXT U.K. Championship event.

No.	Results	Stipulations
1^{D}	Ligero defeated Mike Hitchman	Singles match
2	Moustache Mountain (Trent Seven and Tyler Bate) defeated The Undisputed Era (Kyle O'Reilly and Roderick Strong) (c)	Tag team match for the NXT Tag Team Championship
3	Charlie Morgan defeated Killer Kelly	Singles match
4	Noam Dar defeated Flash Morgan Webster, Mark Andrews and Travis Banks	Fatal four-way match to determine the #1 contender for the WWE United Kingdom Championship
5	Adam Cole (c) defeated Wolfgang	Singles match for the NXT North American Championship
6	Aleister Black and Ricochet defeated EC3 and Velveteen Dream	Tag team match
7	Shayna Baszler (c) defeated Toni Storm by countout	Singles match for the NXT Women's Championship
8	Pete Dunne (c) defeated Zack Gibson	Singles match for the WWE United Kingdom Championship
(c) / – the champion(s) heading into the match; D / – this was a dark match

== Broadcast team ==
Ring name	Real name	Notes
Andy Shepherd	Andrew Shepherd	Ring announcer
Cathy Kelley	Catherine Kelley	Backstage interviewer
Mauro Ranallo	Mauro Ranallo	Lead commentator
Nigel McGuinness	Steven Haworth	Color commentator

== Aftermath ==
On June 18 at day one of the event, it was revealed that WWE's United Kingdom brand would be debuting its first television program, called NXT UK. The inaugural tapings of NXT UK occurred on July 28 and 29 at the Cambridge Corn Exchange.

== See also ==
- Professional wrestling in the United Kingdom
