= NXT UK (WWE brand) =

WWE professional wrestling roster division

- Logo for the brand and the NXT UK television programme
- Product type: British wrestling Sports entertainment
- Current owner: WWE
- Produced by: Paul "Triple H" Levesque
- Country: United Kingdom
- Introduced: 15 December 2016 (as United Kingdom); 18 June 2018 (as NXT UK)
- Discontinued: 4 September 2022
- Related brands: Raw; SmackDown; NXT; Evolve
- Previous names: United Kingdom (2016 – 2018)
- General Manager: Johnny Saint (7 June 2018 – 4 September 2022); Assistant to the General Manager: Sid Scala (12 December 2018 – 18 August 2022)

NXT UK was a United Kingdom-based developmental brand of the American professional wrestling promotion WWE that was introduced in December 2016 and formally launched in 2018. Brands are divisions of WWE's roster where wrestlers are assigned to perform on a weekly basis. Wrestlers assigned to NXT UK primarily appeared on the brand's weekly television program, NXT UK, and the brand's periodic livestreaming events. The brand served as a sub-brand of WWE's developmental territory, NXT, with NXT UK wrestlers also occasionally appearing on its show, NXT, as well as NXT's major events. Unlike WWE's other brands, NXT UK was produced exclusively in the United Kingdom and was specifically centered on wrestlers from there and other countries in Europe.

The brand went on hiatus following the Worlds Collide event on 4 September 2022. It was to be relaunched as NXT Europe, expanding into a pan-European brand to include wrestlers from all European countries. The relaunch was originally to occur in 2023 but was delayed indefinitely due to the WWE–UFC merger as divisions of TKO Group Holdings, which was finalized in September 2023.

== History ==
In a press conference at The O2 Arena on 15 December 2016, Paul "Triple H" Levesque, an executive of the American professional wrestling promotion WWE, revealed that there would be a 16-man tournament to crown the inaugural WWE United Kingdom Champion. The tournament was held over a two-day period, 14 and 15 January 2017, and aired exclusively on the company's online streaming service, the WWE Network. The championship was intended as the top championship of a new WWE Network show, produced in the United Kingdom (at the time, the show and its premiere date had yet to be revealed). Tyler Bate won the inaugural tournament to become the first WWE United Kingdom Champion.

On 19 May 2017, WWE held a follow-up to the United Kingdom Championship tournament, titled United Kingdom Championship Special. On 7 April 2018, a second United Kingdom Championship Tournament event was scheduled for 18 and 19 June at the Royal Albert Hall. On 7 June, Johnny Saint was appointed General Manager of WWE's United Kingdom brand.

On 18 June 2018, it was announced that WWE's United Kingdom brand would begin filming a new show titled NXT UK in July 2018, and that championships for the brand's women's and tag team divisions would be introduced. The brand was in turn officially established as NXT UK.

On 17 October 2018, the inaugural episode of NXT UK aired on the WWE Network at 8 p.m. UK time/3 p.m. Eastern Time. On 31 December 2019, WWE announced that NXT UK would begin airing on BT Sport in the United Kingdom. On 21 January 2020, it was announced that NXT UK would also air on Paramount Network UK on a six-day delay after its WWE Network and BT Sport broadcasts.

Due to the COVID-19 pandemic that began in March 2020, production of NXT UK events were paused. On 10 September 2020, WWE announced the relaunch of NXT UK following its hiatus due to the pandemic. A secondary men's championship was also unveiled.

On 19 August 2021, it was announced that WWE would be a sponsor of Enfield Town F.C.—a seventh-tier football club in the same borough as its UK-based WWE Performance Center facility—in the 2021–22 season, with their kits carrying the NXT UK logo.

On 18 August 2022, WWE announced that NXT UK would take a "brief hiatus" and be rebranded as NXT Europe upon its return in 2023, expanding into a pan-European brand to include wrestlers from all European countries. The final NXT UK event was Worlds Collide on 4 September 2022. Shawn Michaels, who oversees talent development, said the company would work with the staff and talent to launch NXT Europe "bigger and better". The relaunch as NXT Europe would be delayed due to WWE's acquisition by Endeavor, the owner of Ultimate Fighting Championship (UFC), with WWE and UFC merging to become divisions of TKO Group Holdings. The merger was finalized in September 2023. According to Dave Meltzer of the Wrestling Observer Newsletter, WWE planned to launch NXT Europe sometime in 2024, but this did not happen. In April 2025, Triple H confirmed that WWE was still planning to launch NXT Europe.

== Championships ==
=== Overview ===
NXT UK had four championships exclusive to the brand. There were three for men and one for women. There were also two other championships that were shared with the brand.

The top men's championship of NXT UK was the NXT United Kingdom Championship. Established as the WWE United Kingdom Championship in December 2016, the inaugural champion was Tyler Bate, who won the original United Kingdom Championship tournament. In January 2020, the title was renamed to reflect its status as the top title of NXT UK. The title was retired on 4 September 2022 at Worlds Collide when it was unified into the NXT Championship. Bate, the championship's only two-time holder, is recognized as the final champion.

The top championship for female wrestlers was the NXT UK Women's Championship. Unveiled in June 2018, Rhea Ripley won a tournament final to become the inaugural champion. The title was retired on 4 September 2022 at Worlds Collide when it was unified into the NXT Women's Championship. Meiko Satomura is recognized as the final champion.

The NXT UK Tag Team Championship was the tag team championship for men. Unveiled in June 2018, the team of James Drake and Zack Gibson won a tournament final to become the inaugural champions. The title was retired on 4 September 2022 at Worlds Collide when it was unified into the NXT Tag Team Championship. The team of Brooks Jensen and Josh Briggs are recognized as the final champions.

In September 2020, the NXT UK Heritage Cup was unveiled as a secondary championship for men and with a special stipulation in which matches are only contested under British Rounds Rules. The first champion was A-Kid, who won a tournament final to become the inaugural champion. Unlike NXT UK's other championships, which were retired at Worlds Collide on 4 September 2022, the Heritage Cup was not contested at the event. Its status remained unknown until April 2023 when the title was transferred to NXT and renamed the NXT Heritage Cup.

In addition to the above four championships, there were two other championships that were also available to NXT UK wrestlers but not exclusive to the brand. These were the NXT Cruiserweight Championship and the WWE 24/7 Championship.

The NXT Cruiserweight Championship was for wrestlers billed as 205 lbs and under, regarded as cruiserweights. It was originally established for Raw in September 2016 as the WWE Cruiserweight Championship. After 205 Live became its own brand in 2018, the title became exclusive to 205 Live and it then came under the NXT brand with a rename in 2019 when 205 Live merged under NXT. The title's contendership was extended to NXT UK in January 2020 when NXT UK's Jordan Devlin won the championship. The title was then retired in January 2022 when it was unified into the NXT North American Championship, with Carmelo Hayes recognized as the final champion.

Introduced in May 2019, the WWE 24/7 Championship was a specialized championship in which it could be defended anytime, anywhere, as long as a WWE referee was present, allowing it to be defended on any brand. Despite this, the title was never won by an NXT UK wrestler or appeared on any NXT UK event. While NXT UK was discontinued in September 2022, the championship remained active until November 2022. After Nikki Cross won the title on the November 7 episode of Raw, she discarded the belt in a trash can backstage and two days later, it was listed as inactive on WWE.com.

=== Previous championships ===
Championship	Final champion(s)	Reign	Date won	Location	Notes	Ref.
NXT United Kingdom Championship	Tyler Bate	2	7 July 2022	London, England	Defeated Trent Seven in an eight-man single-elimination tournament final for the vacant title on NXT UK. Aired on tape delay on 1 September 2022.	
NXT UK Women's Championship	Meiko Satomura	1	10 June 2021 (air date)	London, England	Defeated Kay Lee Ray on NXT UK. Aired on tape delay on 10 June 2021. Actual date the match took place is unknown, as NXT UK held empty arena tapings for a period of time after resuming operations in late 2020 following a hiatus due to the COVID-19 pandemic.	
NXT UK Heritage Cup	Noam Dar	2	7 July 2022	London, England	Defeated Mark Coffey on NXT UK. Aired on tape delay on 25 August 2022. The title was transferred to NXT in April 2023. Noam Dar was the final champion to hold the title under the NXT UK banner.	
NXT UK Tag Team Championship	Brooks Jensen and Josh Briggs	1	22 June 2022	London, England	Defeated Die Familie (Teoman and Rohan Raja), Dave Mastiff and Jack Starz, and Mark Andrews and Wild Boar for the vacant titles in a fatal four-way elimination match on NXT UK. Aired on tape delay on 23 June 2022.	

=== Other championships used by NXT UK ===
Championship	Final champion(s) recognized by NXT UK	Reign	Date won	Location	Notes	Ref.
NXT Cruiserweight Championship (Note: The championship was shared with the NXT and 205 Live brands from 25 January 2020 until it was retired on 4 January 2022.)	Carmelo Hayes	1	4 January 2022	Orlando, Florida	Defeated Roderick Strong at New Year's Evil to unify the championship with the NXT North American Championship.	
WWE 24/7 Championship (Note: The championship was shared amongst all of WWE's brands, with NXT UK recognizing the championship until the brand went into a hiatus on 4 September 2022.)	Dana Brooke	7	18 July 2022	Tampa, Florida	Pinned champion Tamina during a six-woman tag team match on Raw to win the championship.	

== Television show ==
The WWE Network broadcast NXT UK's eponymous television programme in the United Kingdom and internationally. The inaugural tapings of NXT UK occurred on 28 and 29 July 2018, at the Cambridge Corn Exchange, and began airing on 17 October 2018. Since March 2021, NXT UK was broadcast on Peacock in the United States, due to the American version of the WWE Network merging under Peacock.

== WWE Network events ==
Event	Date	Location	Venue	Main event
United Kingdom Championship Tournament	14 January 2017	Blackpool, Lancashire; England	Empress Ballroom	Tyler Bate vs. Tucker
United Kingdom Championship Tournament	15 January 2017	Blackpool, Lancashire; England	Empress Ballroom	Tyler Bate vs. Pete Dunne for the inaugural WWE United Kingdom Championship
United Kingdom Championship Special	7 May 2017	Norwich, Norfolk; England	Epic Studios	Tyler Bate (c) vs. Mark Andrews for the WWE United Kingdom Championship
United Kingdom Championship Tournament	18 June 2018	Kensington, London; England	Royal Albert Hall	Zack Gibson vs. Travis Banks to determine the #1 contender to the WWE United Kingdom Championship
United Kingdom Championship Tournament	19 June 2018	Kensington, London; England	Royal Albert Hall	Pete Dunne (c) vs. Zack Gibson for the WWE United Kingdom Championship
NXT UK TakeOver: Blackpool	12 January 2019	Blackpool, Lancashire; England	Empress Ballroom	Pete Dunne (c) vs. Joe Coffey for the WWE United Kingdom Championship
NXT UK TakeOver: Cardiff	31 August 2019	Cardiff; Wales	Motorpoint Arena Cardiff	Walter (c) vs. Tyler Bate for the WWE United Kingdom Championship
NXT UK TakeOver: Blackpool II	12 January 2020	Blackpool, Lancashire; England	Empress Ballroom	Walter (c) vs. Joe Coffey for the WWE United Kingdom Championship

== See also ==
- Professional wrestling in the United Kingdom
