= United Kingdom Championship Tournament (2017) =

WWE Network event

- Promotional poster featuring various tournament participants
- Promotion: WWE
- Brand: United Kingdom
- Date: January 14, 2017 (first round); January 15, 2017 (finals)
- City: Blackpool, Lancashire, England
- Venue: Empress Ballroom
- Attendance: 3,236

WWE event chronology
← Previous; Roadblock: End of the Line	Next → NXT TakeOver: San Antonio

United Kingdom Championship Tournament chronology
← Previous; First	Next → 2018

WWE in Europe chronology
← Previous; NXT TakeOver: London	Next → United Kingdom Championship Special

The 2017 United Kingdom Championship Tournament was a two-day professional wrestling livestreaming event and tournament promoted by the American promotion WWE. It was the inaugural United Kingdom Championship Tournament and aired exclusively on the WWE Network. The first round took place on January 14, 2017, while the finals occurred on January 15, with both nights airing at 8:00 p.m. Greenwich Mean Time (3:00 p.m. Eastern Time). The tournament was held at the Empress Ballroom in Blackpool, Lancashire, England and crowned the inaugural WWE United Kingdom Champion, which was won by Tyler Bate. The event served as a soft launch for what would later become the NXT UK brand in June 2018.

== Background ==
In a press conference at The O2 Arena on December 15, 2016, Paul "Triple H" Levesque, an executive for the American professional wrestling promotion WWE and head of the promotion's NXT brand, revealed that there would be a 16-man tournament to crown the inaugural WWE United Kingdom Champion. A United Kingdom Championship Tournament: Preview show aired on the WWE Network on January 9, 2017, with a behind-the-scenes look at the creators of the event and the 16 competitors. The tournament was held over a two-day period, January 14–15, 2017, at the Empress Ballroom in Blackpool, Lancashire, England, with both nights livestreamed exclusively on the WWE Network at 8:00 p.m. Greenwich Mean Time (3:00 p.m. Eastern Time). The championship later became the top championship of the NXT UK brand and its show, NXT UK, a WWE Network show produced in the United Kingdom that premiered on October 17, 2018.

== Participants ==
Wrestler	Hometown	Weight (lb)	Ref
Mark Andrews	Cardiff, Wales	159	
Tyler Bate	Dudley, West Midlands, England	175	
Danny Burch	London, England	190	
Joseph Conners	Nottingham, Nottinghamshire, England	196	
Jordan Devlin	(Republic of Ireland) Bray, County Wicklow, Ireland	180	
James Drake	Blackpool, Lancashire, England	181	
Pete Dunne	Birmingham, West Midlands, England	205	
H.C. Dyer	Cambridge, Cambridgeshire, England	213	
Sam Gradwell	Blackpool, Lancashire, England	212	
Saxon Huxley	Hartlepool, County Durham, England	215	
Roy Johnson	London, England	206	
Dan Moloney	Birmingham, West Midlands, England	216	
Trent Seven	Wolverhampton, West Midlands, England	216	
Tucker	Belfast, Northern Ireland	191	
Tyson T-Bone	Malvern, Worcestershire, England	245	
Wolfgang	Glasgow, Scotland	255	

=== Alternates ===
These competitors were initially announced for the tournament, but were not selected as part of the final 16. They were backup competitors if there were any injuries to the final 16, which there were not.

Wrestler	Hometown	Weight (lb)
Tiger Ali	Swindon, Wiltshire, England	185
Ringo Ryan	Liverpool, Merseyside, England	198
Jack Starz	Leicester, Leicestershire, England	172
Chris Tyler	Cambridge, Cambridgeshire, England	201

== Results ==
=== 14 January ===
No.	Results	Stipulations
1^{D}	Chris Tyler and Jack Starz defeated Ringo Ryan and Tiger Ali	Tag team match
2	Trent Seven defeated HC Dyer	WWE United Kingdom Championship tournament first round match
3	Jordan Devlin defeated Danny Burch	WWE United Kingdom Championship tournament first round match
4	Sam Gradwell defeated Saxon Huxley	WWE United Kingdom Championship tournament first round match
5	Pete Dunne defeated Roy Johnson	WWE United Kingdom Championship tournament first round match
6	Wolfgang defeated Tyson T-Bone	WWE United Kingdom Championship tournament first round match
7	Joseph Conners defeated James Drake	WWE United Kingdom Championship tournament first round match
8	Mark Andrews defeated Dan Moloney	WWE United Kingdom Championship tournament first round match
9	Tyler Bate defeated Tucker	WWE United Kingdom Championship tournament first round match
D / – this was a dark match

=== 15 January ===
No.	Results	Stipulations
1^{D}	Saxon Huxley and Tucker defeated Dan Moloney and Nathan Cruz	Tag team match
2	Pete Dunne defeated Sam Gradwell	WWE United Kingdom Championship tournament quarterfinal match
3	Mark Andrews defeated Joseph Conners	WWE United Kingdom Championship tournament quarterfinal match
4	Wolfgang defeated Trent Seven	WWE United Kingdom Championship tournament quarterfinal match
5	Tyler Bate defeated Jordan Devlin	WWE United Kingdom Championship tournament quarterfinal match
6	Pete Dunne defeated Mark Andrews	WWE United Kingdom Championship tournament semifinal match
7	Tyler Bate defeated Wolfgang	WWE United Kingdom Championship tournament semifinal match
8	Neville defeated Tommy End	Singles match
9	Tyler Bate defeated Pete Dunne	Tournament final for the inaugural WWE United Kingdom Championship
D / – this was a dark match

=== Tournament bracket ===
The following time limits were in place:

- First Round: 15 minutes
- Quarterfinals: 20 minutes
- Semifinals: 30 minutes
- Final: no time limit

First Round; United Kingdom Championship Tournament; January 14, 2017
(England) Tyler Bate	Pinfall
(Northern Ireland) Tucker	10:34
(Republic of Ireland) Jordan Devlin	Pinfall
(England) Danny Burch	8:55
(England) Trent Seven	Pinfall
(England) H.C. Dyer	5:25
(Scotland) Wolfgang	Pinfall
(England) Tyson T-Bone	6:20
(Wales) Mark Andrews	Pinfall
(England) Dan Moloney	5:35
(England) James Drake	7:12
(England) Joseph Conners	Pinfall
(England) Pete Dunne	Pinfall
(England) Roy Johnson	7:30
(England) Saxon Huxley	6:00
(England) Sam Gradwell	Pinfall

Quarterfinals; United Kingdom Championship Tournament; January 15, 2017
(England) Tyler Bate	Pinfall
(Republic of Ireland) Jordan Devlin	6:05
(England) Trent Seven	6:35
(Scotland) Wolfgang	Pinfall
(Wales) Mark Andrews	Pinfall
(England) Joseph Conners	8:10
(England) Pete Dunne	Pinfall
(England) Sam Gradwell	4:50

Semifinals; United Kingdom Championship Tournament; January 15, 2017
(England) Tyler Bate	Pinfall
(Scotland) Wolfgang	5:55
(Wales) Mark Andrews	10:33
(England) Pete Dunne	Pinfall

Final; United Kingdom Championship Tournament; January 15, 2017
(England) Tyler Bate	Pinfall
(England) Pete Dunne	15:10

== Broadcast team ==
Ring name	Real name	Notes
Andy Shepherd	Andrew Shepherd	Ring announcer
Charly Caruso	Charly Arnolt	Backstage interviewer
Michael Cole	Michael Coulthard	Lead commentator
Nigel McGuinness	Steven Haworth	Color commentator

== Aftermath ==
On May 15, 2017, a follow-up to the United Kingdom Championship tournament was announced by WWE, titled the United Kingdom Championship Special, which aired on May 18, 2017. In April 2018, a second WWE United Kingdom Championship Tournament was announced, to be held from June 18–19, 2018 at the Royal Albert Hall.

== See also ==
- Professional wrestling in the United Kingdom
