= NXT United Kingdom Championship =

Former men's professional wrestling championship in WWE

United Kingdom Championship
- The final NXT United Kingdom Championship belt design with default side plates (2020–2022)

Details
- Promotion: WWE
- Date established: 15 December 2016
- Date retired: 4 September 2022 (unified with the NXT Championship)

Other names
- WWE United Kingdom Championship (2016–2020); NXT United Kingdom Championship (2020–2022)
Statistics
- First champion: Tyler Bate
- Final champion: Tyler Bate
- Most reigns: Tyler Bate (2 reigns)
- Longest reign: Walter (870 days)
- Shortest reign: Tyler Bate (2nd reign, 59 days) (Note: WWE officially recognizes that Tyler Bate held the title for 3 days due to tape delay, despite Bate appearing on NXT a couple of weeks before his title win on NXT UK aired.)
- Oldest champion: Walter (31 years, 228 days)
- Youngest champion: Tyler Bate (19 years, 314 days)
- Heaviest champion: Walter (297 lb (135 kg))
- Lightest champion: Tyler Bate (175 lb (79 kg))

The NXT United Kingdom Championship was a men's professional wrestling championship that was created and promoted by the American promotion WWE. It was primarily defended as the top championship of the NXT UK brand division, a sister brand of WWE's developmental territory NXT based in the United Kingdom. It was also occasionally defended at NXT events and had also been defended on independent wrestling shows in the United Kingdom before the COVID-19 pandemic.

Established on 15 December 2016 as the WWE United Kingdom Championship, the title was first awarded to Tyler Bate, who won the inaugural WWE United Kingdom Championship Tournament on 15 January 2017. The brand's show of the same name had its first tapings in August 2018, which began airing in October. From its inception up until the debut of NXT UK, the title was primarily defended on the NXT brand and shows produced by UK-based independent wrestling promotions. In January 2020, the title was renamed to reflect its status as the top title of NXT UK. On 4 September 2022 at Worlds Collide, the title was unified into the NXT Championship, officially retiring the title in the process, with Bate, the title's only multi-time holder, recognized as the final champion.

== History ==
In a press conference at The O2 Arena on 15 December 2016, Triple H, the chief operating officer and head of NXT for the American professional wrestling promotion WWE, revealed that there would be a 16-man single-elimination tournament to crown the inaugural WWE United Kingdom Champion for the promotion's new United Kingdom division. The tournament was held over a two-day period, 14 and 15 January 2017, and was streamed exclusively on the WWE Network. Tyler Bate won the inaugural tournament to become the first WWE United Kingdom Champion.

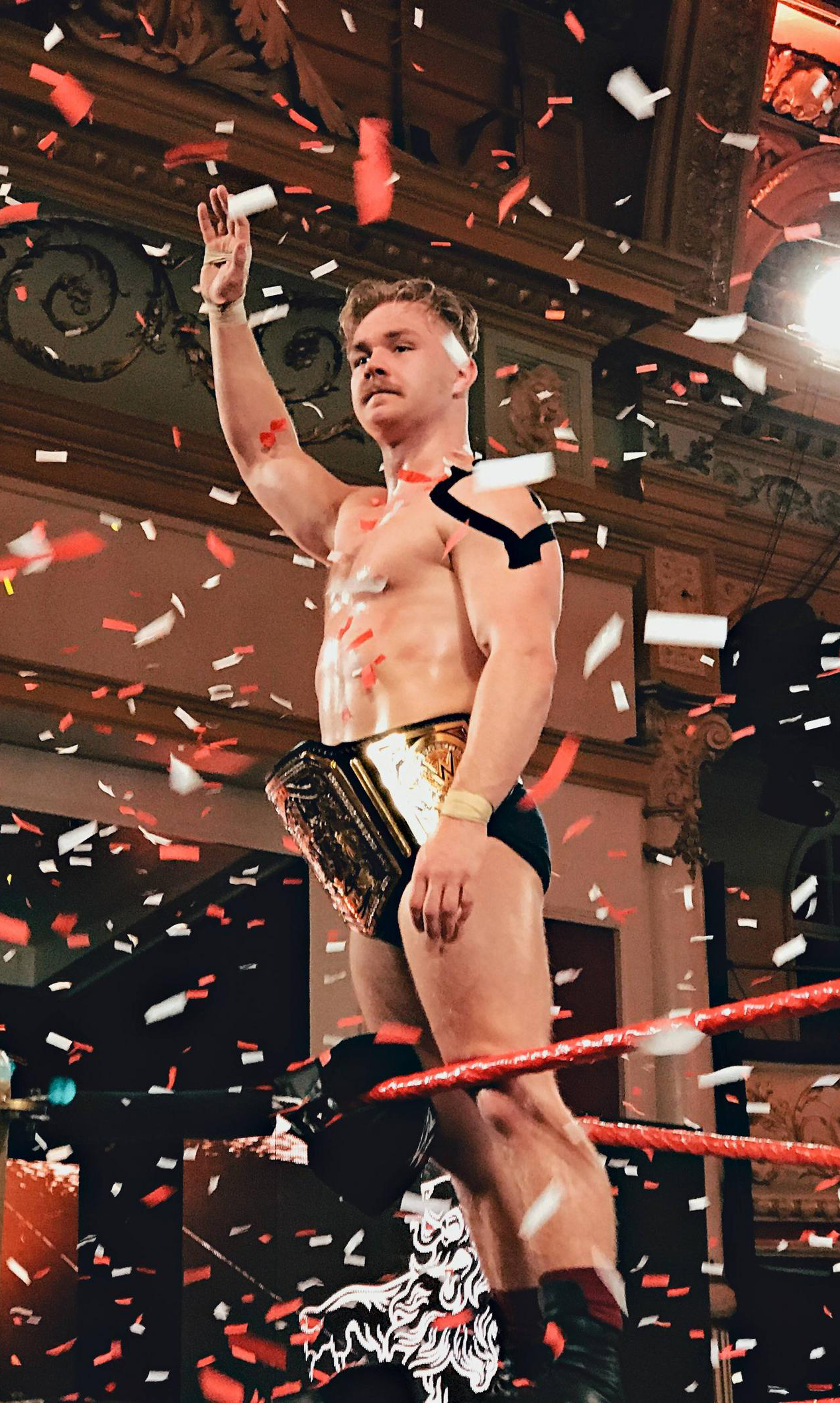
The inaugural, record two-time, and final champion Tyler Bate, shown here winning the first United Kingdom Championship Tournament.

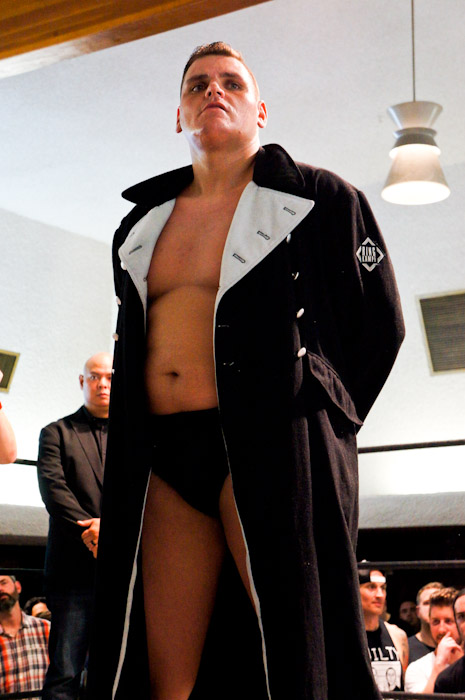
Longest-reigning champion Walter, who held the title for 870 days.

Following the inaugural tournament in 2017, the title began being featured on WWE's developmental brand NXT when Bate debuted during the 28 January 2017, tapings of NXT in San Antonio, Texas, which aired 1 February. During the 1 February tapings at the brand's former home base of Full Sail University in Winter Park, Florida, the title's very first defense took place, where Bate defeated Trent Seven (aired 15 February). The title was defended for the first time outside of WWE when Bate retained the title against Mark Andrews on a show for the London-based promotion, Progress Wrestling; the show took place in Orlando, Florida, on 31 March as part of WrestleMania Axxess. The first title change, as well as the first defense to air live, took place on 20 May 2017 at TakeOver: Chicago, where Pete Dunne defeated Bate to become champion. Although unsuccessful, Johnny Gargano was the first wrestler from outside of the United Kingdom division to challenge for the UK title on the 18 November tapings of NXT (aired on 22 November).

When the championship was unveiled in December 2016, it was announced to be the top championship of a new WWE Network show, produced in the United Kingdom. However, it was not until mid-2018 when WWE formally established NXT UK as the brand for their United Kingdom division and sister brand of their American-based NXT. The brand's show, also titled NXT UK, had its first tapings in August, which began airing on 17 October. On the premiere episode, Dunne retained the UK Championship against Noam Dar. During the 17 January 2020 tapings of NXT UK, the title was renamed to NXT United Kingdom Championship to reflect its status as the top title of NXT UK.

In August 2022, WWE announced that the NXT UK brand would go on hiatus and would relaunch as NXT Europe at a later time. As such, NXT UK's championship's were unified into their respective NXT championship counterparts. Subsequently, the NXT United Kingdom Championship was retired on 4 September 2022 at Worlds Collide. At the event, Bron Breakker defeated Tyler Bate to unify the NXT United Kingdom Championship into Breakker's NXT Championship, with Bate, the title's only two-time holder, recognized as the final NXT UK Champion. Breakker went forward as the unified NXT Champion.

=== Inaugural tournament ===
The following time limits were in place:

- First Round: 15 minutes
- Quarterfinals: 20 minutes
- Semifinals: 30 minutes
- Final: no time limit

First Round; United Kingdom Championship Tournament; January 14, 2017
(England) Tyler Bate	Pinfall
(Northern Ireland) Tucker	10:34
(Republic of Ireland) Jordan Devlin	Pinfall
(England) Danny Burch	8:55
(England) Trent Seven	Pinfall
(England) H.C. Dyer	5:25
(Scotland) Wolfgang	Pinfall
(England) Tyson T-Bone	6:20
(Wales) Mark Andrews	Pinfall
(England) Dan Moloney	5:35
(England) James Drake	7:12
(England) Joseph Conners	Pinfall
(England) Pete Dunne	Pinfall
(England) Roy Johnson	7:30
(England) Saxon Huxley	6:00
(England) Sam Gradwell	Pinfall

Quarterfinals; United Kingdom Championship Tournament; January 15, 2017
(England) Tyler Bate	Pinfall
(Republic of Ireland) Jordan Devlin	6:05
(England) Trent Seven	6:35
(Scotland) Wolfgang	Pinfall
(Wales) Mark Andrews	Pinfall
(England) Joseph Conners	8:10
(England) Pete Dunne	Pinfall
(England) Sam Gradwell	4:50

Semifinals; United Kingdom Championship Tournament; January 15, 2017
(England) Tyler Bate	Pinfall
(Scotland) Wolfgang	5:55
(Wales) Mark Andrews	10:33
(England) Pete Dunne	Pinfall

Final; United Kingdom Championship Tournament; January 15, 2017
(England) Tyler Bate	Pinfall
(England) Pete Dunne	15:10

=== Vacant title tournament (2022) ===
1st Round; NXT UK; July 6, 2022 (Aired: August 11–18)
Oliver Carter	Pinfall
Charlie Dempsey	9:11
Wolfgang	8:55
Trent Seven	Pinfall
Tyler Bate	Pinfall
Kenny Williams	13:21
Joe Coffey	Pinfall
Mark Andrews	7:42

Semifinals; NXT UK; July 7, 2022 (Aired: August 25)
Oliver Carter	9:15
Trent Seven	Pinfall
Tyler Bate	Pinfall
Joe Coffey	12:00

Final; NXT UK; July 7, 2022 (Aired: September 1)
Trent Seven	20:31
Tyler Bate	Pinfall

== Championship belt design ==
The championship's center plate was inspired by the United Kingdom's royal coat of arms

The base design of the belt was similar to the WWE Championship belt (introduced in 2014), with notable differences. Instead of a large cut out of the WWE logo, the center plate was modeled after the United Kingdom's royal coat of arms, featuring a lion and a horse (instead of the traditional unicorn) on either side of the arms, with a shield at the center; atop the shield were the crown jewels. The banner atop the arms read "United Kingdom" while the banner below read "Champion". Gold divider bars separated the center plate from the belt's two side plates. In what became a prominent feature of WWE's championship belts, the side plates featured removable center sections that could be replaced with the reigning champion's logo; the default side plates featured the WWE logo on a red globe. The plates were on a black leather strap. When the championship was originally introduced as the WWE United Kingdom Championship, the shield at the center of the main plate featured the WWE logo, but that was changed to the NXT UK logo on 17 January 2020 when the title was renamed to NXT United Kingdom Championship.

== Reigns ==
Over the championship's nearly six year history, there were five reigns between four champions. Tyler Bate was the inaugural champion and is also recognized as the final champion. He also had the most reigns at two, he was the youngest champion at 19, and his second reign was the shortest reign at 59 days (3 days as recognized by WWE due to tape delay, despite Bate appearing as champion on NXT a couple of weeks before his title win on NXT UK). Walter had the longest reign, which lasted 870 days, and he was also the oldest champion when he won the title at 31.

Name	Years
WWE United Kingdom Championship	15 December 2016 – 17 January 2020
NXT United Kingdom Championship	17 January 2020 – 4 September 2022

Key
No.	Overall reign number
Reign	Reign number for the specific champion
Days	Number of days held
Days recog.	Number of days held recognized by the promotion

No.	Champion	Championship change			Reign statistics			Notes	Ref.
No.	Champion	Date	Event	Location	Reign	Days	Days recog.	Notes	Ref.
WWE: NXT
1	Tyler Bate	15 January 2017	United Kingdom Championship Tournament	Blackpool, England	1	125	125	Defeated Pete Dunne in the tournament final to become the inaugural WWE United Kingdom Champion. Bate subsequently defended the title on the NXT brand and at independent shows in the United Kingdom.	
2	Pete Dunne	20 May 2017	TakeOver: Chicago	Rosemont, Illinois, U.S.	1	685	685	The title became the top championship of NXT UK when the brand was established in June 2018, but continued to occasionally be defended on NXT and at independent shows.	
WWE: NXT UK
3	Walter	5 April 2019	TakeOver: New York	Brooklyn, New York, U.S.	1	870	870	The title was renamed to NXT United Kingdom Championship on 17 January 2020.	
4	Ilja Dragunov	22 August 2021	TakeOver 36	Orlando, Florida, U.S.	1	319	346	WWE recognizes Dragunov's reign as ending on 4 August 2022, when the following episode aired on tape delay.	
—	Vacated	7 July 2022	NXT UK	London, England	—	—	—	Ilja Dragunov was forced to relinquish the title after suffering an injury. Aired on tape delay on 4 August 2022.	
5	Tyler Bate	7 July 2022	NXT UK	London, England	2	59	3	Defeated Trent Seven in the final of a tournament to win the vacant championship. WWE recognizes Bate's reign as beginning on 1 September 2022, when the episode aired on tape delay, despite the fact that Bate started appearing as champion on 16 August at NXT Heatwave.	
—	Unified	4 September 2022	Worlds Collide	Orlando, Florida, U.S.	—	—	—	Bron Breakker defeated Tyler Bate to unify the NXT United Kingdom Championship into the NXT Championship. The NXT United Kingdom Championship was retired with Bate recognized as the final champion. Breakker went forward as the unified NXT Champion.	

== Combined reigns ==
Rank	Wrestler	No. of reigns	Combined days	Combined days recognized by WWE
1	Walter	1	870	
2	Pete Dunne	1	685	
3	Ilja Dragunov	1	319	346
4	Tyler Bate	2	184	128

== See also ==
- World championships in WWE
- Professional wrestling in the United Kingdom
