= JD McDonagh =

Irish professional wrestler (born 1990)

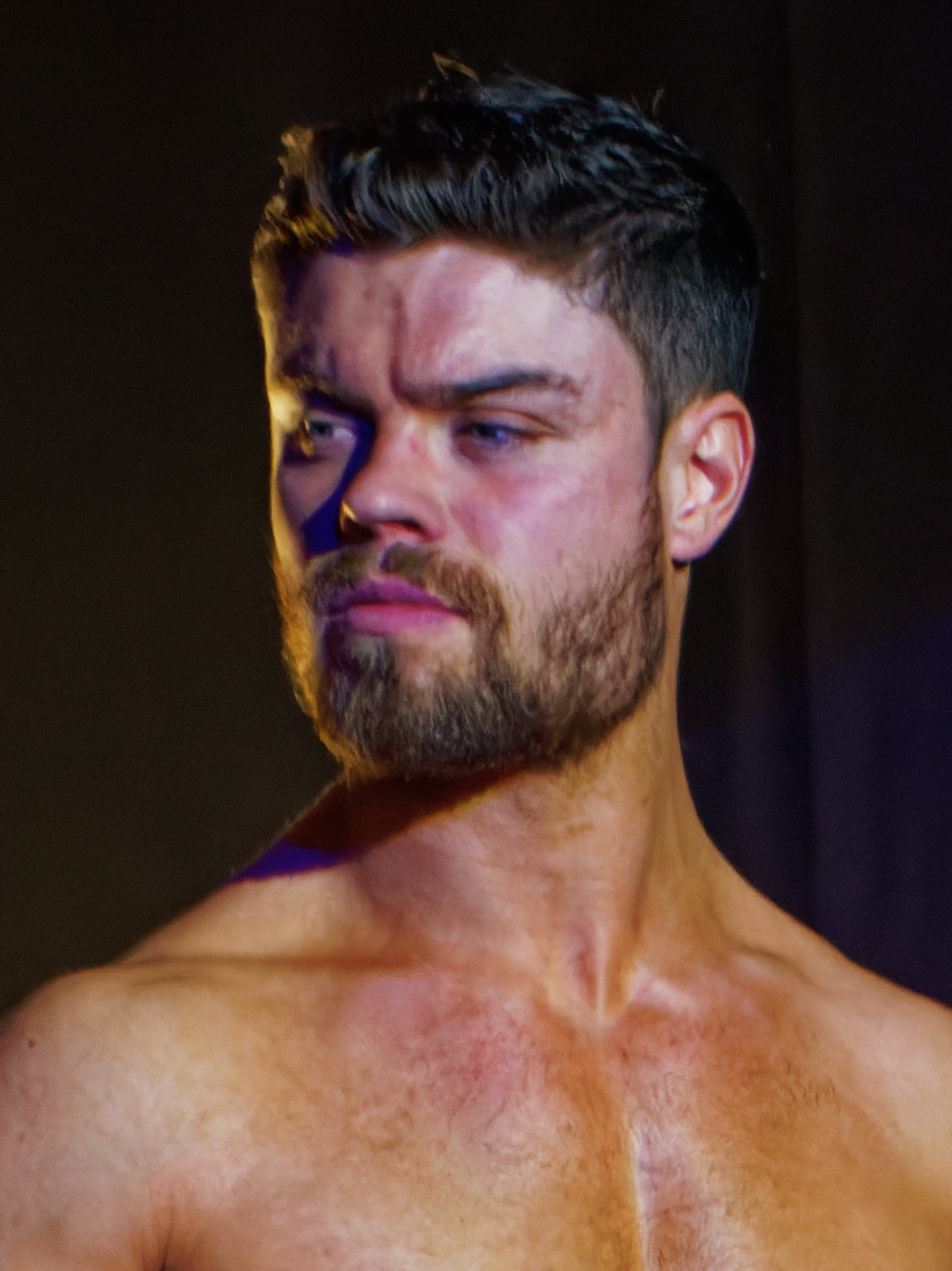
- McDonagh in 2018

Personal information
- Born: Jordan Devlin; 15 March 1990 (age 36) Bray, County Wicklow, Ireland

Professional wrestling career
- Ring name(s): Aguila Artois; Aguila II; Frank David; JD McDonagh; Jordan Devlin
- Billed height: 5 ft 10 in (1.78 m)
- Billed weight: 195 lb (88 kg)
- Billed from: Bray, County Wicklow, Ireland; Dublin, Ireland
- Trained by: Finn Bálor; Paul Tracey
- Debut: May 28, 2006

Jordan Devlin (born 15 March 1990) is an Irish professional wrestler. He is signed to WWE, where he performs on the Raw brand under the ring name JD McDonagh and is a member of The Judgment Day stable.

Devlin's other accomplishments on the European independent circuit include being a two-time OTT World Champion and a one-time PROGRESS Tag Team Champion. He is also known for his tenure under the ring name Frank David with Pro Wrestling Zero1 in Japan, where he became a one-time NWA International Lightweight Tag Team Champion. In WWE, he is a former two-time World Tag Team Champion alongside Finn Bálor. He is also a former one-time NXT Cruiserweight Champion, where his 439-day reign stands as the longest in the title's history.

== Early life ==
Devlin was born on 15 March 1990 in Bray, County Wicklow. He was educated at C.B.C. Monkstown in Monkstown and later graduated with a BA from University College Dublin.

== Professional wrestling career ==
=== Independent circuit (2006–2020) ===
When he was 16 years old, Devlin began training to be a professional wrestler by Finn Bálor (then known as Fergal Devitt) and Paul Tracey. At the age of 21, Devlin spent six months wrestling for Pro Wrestling Zero1 in Japan, where he and Shawn Guinness held the NWA International Lightweight Tag Team Championship.

Devlin made his debut for Insane Championship Wrestling (ICW) on 7 April 2013, where he and Shawn Maxer challenged the Bucky Boys for the ICW Tag Team Championship in a Three Way with Fight Club at ICW: Get Yer Rat Oot. He wrestled both Trent Seven and Joe Coffey individually for the ICW World Heavyweight Championship in 2017. He also failed to win the ICW Zero-G Championship from BT Gunn at ICW: Fight Club that same year, but received another opportunity at ICW: BarraMania 4 in a gauntlet match where he was eliminated by Andy Wild.

On 3 February 2018, Devlin became the inaugural Over the Top Wrestling World Heavyweight Champion, holding the title until losing it to WALTER on 18 August 2018. On 15 September 2019, Devlin and Scotty Davis won the Progress Tag Team Championship, defeating Grizzled Young Veterans and Aussie Open at Progress Chapter 95: Still Chasing. They were stripped of the titles after 278 days in June 2020 due to allegations made against Devlin during the Speaking Out movement.

=== WWE (2016–present) ===
==== NXT UK and NXT (2016–2023) ====
On 15 December 2016, Devlin was announced as one of 16 men competing in the first ever United Kingdom Championship Tournament to crown the first ever WWE United Kingdom Champion on 14 and 15 January 2017. Devlin defeated Danny Burch in the first round, advancing to the quarterfinals, where he was defeated by Tyler Bate. He also appeared at several WWE live shows. On 18 May 2018, WWE announced via their YouTube channel that Devlin would be one of 16 contestants in the second annual United Kingdom Championship Tournament, where he lost to Flash Morgan Webster in the quarterfinals.

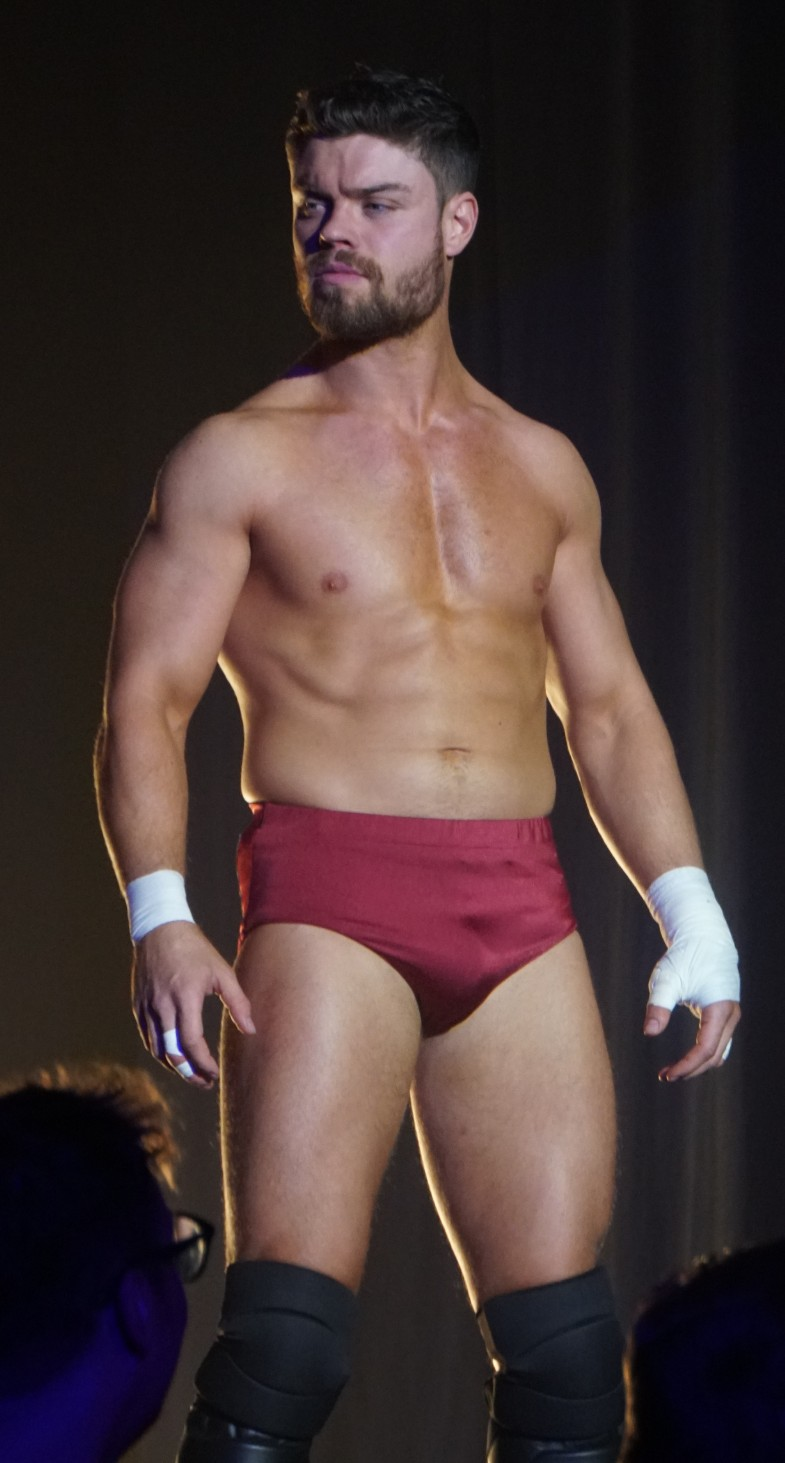
Devlin in 2018

Devlin made his NXT UK debut on 31 October, defeating Tucker. On 28 November episode of NXT UK, Devlin challenged Pete Dunne for the NXT United Kingdom Championship in a losing effort. He then entered a feud with Travis Banks, setting up a match at NXT UK TakeOver: Blackpool on 12 January 2019. However, both competitors attacked each other before the match could begin, with Devlin taking out the injured knee of Banks. He then referred to himself as Ireland's best fighter, establishing himself as a heel. He was interrupted by the general manager of the brand, Johnny Saint, who scheduled a match against an unknown opponent revealed to be Finn Bálor, who defeated Devlin. On 26 and 27 January, Devlin participated in the Worlds Collide tournament, winning a 15-man battle royal to earn a bye in the first round. He defeated Drew Gulak in the quarterfinals before being eliminated by Velveteen Dream in the semifinals. On 6 March episode of NXT UK, Devlin defeated Banks in a falls count anywhere match to end their feud. At NXT UK TakeOver: Blackpool II on 12 January 2020, Devlin lost to Tyler Bate.

At Worlds Collide on 25 January, Devlin defeated Banks, Isaiah "Swerve" Scott and Angel Garza in a fatal-four-way match to win the NXT Cruiserweight Championship. Devlin successfully defended the title across NXT and NXT UK against opponents such as Lio Rush, Banks and Trent Seven. In April, it was revealed that Devlin was unable to defend the title due to travel restrictions caused by the COVID-19 pandemic in Ireland. This led to the announcement of a tournament to crown an interim Cruiserweight Champion. Devlin responded by calling whoever won a "fraud" and stating that he would prove himself as the true Cruiserweight Champion upon his eventual return. On the 18 March 2021 episode of NXT, Devlin challenged interim champion Santos Escobar to a match at NXT TakeOver: Stand & Deliver to determine the undisputed NXT Cruiserweight Champion. At Night 2 of Stand & Deliver on 8 April, Devlin lost to Escobar in a ladder match, ending his reign at 438 days.

On 27 January 2022 episode of NXT UK, Devlin faced Ilja Dragunov for the NXT UK Championship in an empty arena, but was unsuccessful. After trading verbal shots with Dragunov, Devlin would get another chance at the title, under the stipulation that the loser leaves NXT UK. The match took place on the 200th episode of NXT UK, where Devlin failed to win the title, marking his final appearance for the brand.

On 21 June episode of NXT, a vignette aired announcing Devlin's arrival on the NXT brand under the new ring name JD McDonagh. He made his debut at NXT: The Great American Bash on 5 July, attacking NXT Champion Bron Breakker after his title defense against Cameron Grimes. At NXT: Heatwave on 16 August, McDonagh unsuccessfully challenged Breakker for the NXT Championship. On 20 September episode of NXT, McDonagh defeated Tyler Bate to earn another title match against Breakker. After the match, they were confronted by Dragunov. This led to a triple threat match at Halloween Havoc on 22 October, where McDonagh once again failed to win the title. He competed in the inaugural Iron Survivor Challenge at NXT Deadline on 10 December, which was won by Grayson Waller. At NXT Stand & Deliver on 1 April 2023, he challenged for the NXT North American Championship in a fatal-five-way match, which was won by Wes Lee. On 2 May episode of NXT, McDonagh defeated Dragon Lee in what would be his final match for the brand.

==== The Judgment Day (2023–present) ====
As part of the 2023 WWE Draft, McDonagh was drafted to the Raw brand. On 15 May episode of Raw, he competed in a battle royal to determine the number one contender for the Intercontinental Championship at Night of Champions, but was eliminated by Dolph Ziggler, who McDonagh attacked after his elimination. He wrestled Ziggler on 29 May episode of Raw, which ended in a double countout. After the match, he would once again attack Ziggler.

Following this, McDonagh started appearing in backstage segments with his real-life mentor Finn Bálor, a member of The Judgment Day stable. At Crown Jewel on 4 November, McDonagh lost to Sami Zayn on the kickoff show. Two weeks later on Raw, McDonagh became a full-fledged member of the stable. At Survivor Series: WarGames on 25 November, McDonagh, alongside The Judgment Day and Drew McIntyre lost to Cody Rhodes, Zayn, Jey Uso, Seth Rollins and the returning Randy Orton in a WarGames match. At the closing stages of the match, McDonagh was thrown off the cage by Zayn and Rollins into an RKO from Orton. On 18 December episode of Raw, McDonagh lost to R-Truth in a Miracle on 34th Street Fight match with a Loser Leaves The Judgment Day stipulation. Later that night, Priest informed McDonagh that he was still a part of The Judgment Day. At Royal Rumble on 27 January 2024, McDonagh entered his first Royal Rumble match at number 23, but was quickly eliminated in three seconds by Jey Uso after Bron Breakker attacked him and was put into the ring by R-Truth.

On 13 May episode of Raw, McDonagh and Bálor won a fatal four-way match with help from Carlito to become the number one contenders for the World Tag Team Championship the following week, but they failed to win the titles from Awesome Truth (The Miz and R-Truth) after Braun Strowman prevented Carlito from interfering. On 24 June episode of Raw, with help from Liv Morgan, McDonagh and Bálor won the titles from Awesome Truth, marking his first title win on the main roster. On 5 August episode of Raw, McDonagh was revealed to be part of the revamped Judgment Day with Carlito and Morgan, replacing Damian Priest and Rhea Ripley. On 16 September episode of Raw, McDonagh and Bálor defeated The New Day (Kofi Kingston and Xavier Woods) to retain the titles in their first defense. McDonagh and Bálor successfully defended the titles against The War Raiders (Erik and Ivar) on 25 November episode of Raw, before losing them in a rematch on 16 December episode of Raw after interference from Priest, ending their reign at 175 days. On 27 January 2025 episode of Raw, McDonagh and "Dirty" Dominik Mysterio failed to regain the titles from The War Raiders. During the match, McDonagh suffered an injury after he attempted a moonsault to the outside but his body bounced off the announce table. Despite finishing the match, McDonagh later revealed he had suffered broken ribs and a punctured lung, putting him out of action for a couple of months.

After a three-month hiatus, McDonagh made his return on the Raw after WrestleMania 41 on April 21, and two months later he and Bálor defeated The New Day (Kofi Kingston and Xavier Woods) to win the World Tag Team Championship for a second time.They lost the titles on the 20 October episode of Raw to AJ Styles and Dragon Lee ending their second reign at 112 days, and, two months later, he had a hand surgery. At Night 2 of WrestleMania 42 on 19 April 2026, McDonagh was unsuccessful in winning the WWE Intercontinental Championship in a ladder match. The Judgment Day started a feud with Danhausen after they tried to pay him $100,000 to curse Oba Femi which Danhausen would refuse but kept the money. This would lead to a match at Saturday Night's Main Event on July 18, where Danhausen defeated McDonagh in a No Disqualification match after assistance from Karl-Anthony Towns.

== Other media ==
In May 2017, Devlin appeared in the WWE 24 network special on Finn Bálor. Devlin is a playable character in WWE 2K22 as Jordan Devlin, and in WWE 2K23, WWE 2K24 , WWE 2K25 and, WWE 2K26 as JD McDonagh.

== Personal life ==
Although Devlin keeps his personal life largely private, he was publicly seen with his girlfriend at a friend's wedding in Lisbon, Portugal in June 2022. The couple later married in early 2023, with Devlin sharing a photo of them together on his official Instagram account, captioned, “I have been loving you a long time.” Despite this, he has not mentioned her in any of his interviews.

Outside of wrestling, Devlin enjoys watching motorsports. He was spotted with his father attending the 2021 Abu Dhabi Grand Prix at the Yas Marina Circuit. He is also a fan of football and is a lifelong supporter of Liverpool F.C..

=== Domestic violence allegations ===
In June 2020, during the Speaking Out movement, an allegation of physical assault was made against Devlin by a woman called Hannah Francesca. She tweeted photos of bruises on her legs that she alleged were caused by Devlin. WWE stated that they were looking into the allegations and that they take any allegation of this nature very seriously". Devlin denied the allegations, calling them "completely and utterly false" and that it was "a case of a malicious personal agenda being executed against [him] on the back of a very brave telling of true experiences by other women". Francesca's claims were subsequently deleted and she removed her presence from public forums. Devlin made his television return to WWE in March 2021 once Ireland's COVID-19 travel restrictions allowed, seemingly confirming that WWE's investigation into the matter had cleared his name, though no official announcement was made.

== Championships and accomplishments ==
- British Championship Wrestling
  - BCW Tag Team Championship (1 time) – with Sean South
- Fight Factory Pro Wrestling
  - Irish Junior Heavyweight Championship (1 time)
- NWA Ireland
  - NWA Ireland Junior Heavyweight Championship (1 time)
  - NWA Ireland Tag Team Championship (1 time) – with Sir Michael W. Winchester
- Over the Top Wrestling
  - OTT World Championship (2 times)
  - OTT No Limits Championship (1 time)
- Premier British Wrestling
  - PBW Tag Team Championship (1 time) – with Sean South
- Progress Wrestling
  - Progress Tag Team Championship (1 time) – with Scotty Davis
- Pro Wrestling Illustrated
  - Ranked No. 58 of the top 500 singles wrestlers in the PWI 500 in 2019
- Pro Wrestling Zero1
  - NWA International Lightweight Tag Team Championship (1 time) – with Shawn Guinness
- TNT Extreme Wrestling
  - TNT World Championship (1 time)
- WWE
  - NXT Cruiserweight Championship (1 time)
  - World Tag Team Championship (2 times) – with Finn Bálor
  - Slammy Award (1 time)
    - Faction of the Year (2024) – as a member of The Judgment Day
