= Trent Seven =

British professional wrestler (born 1981)

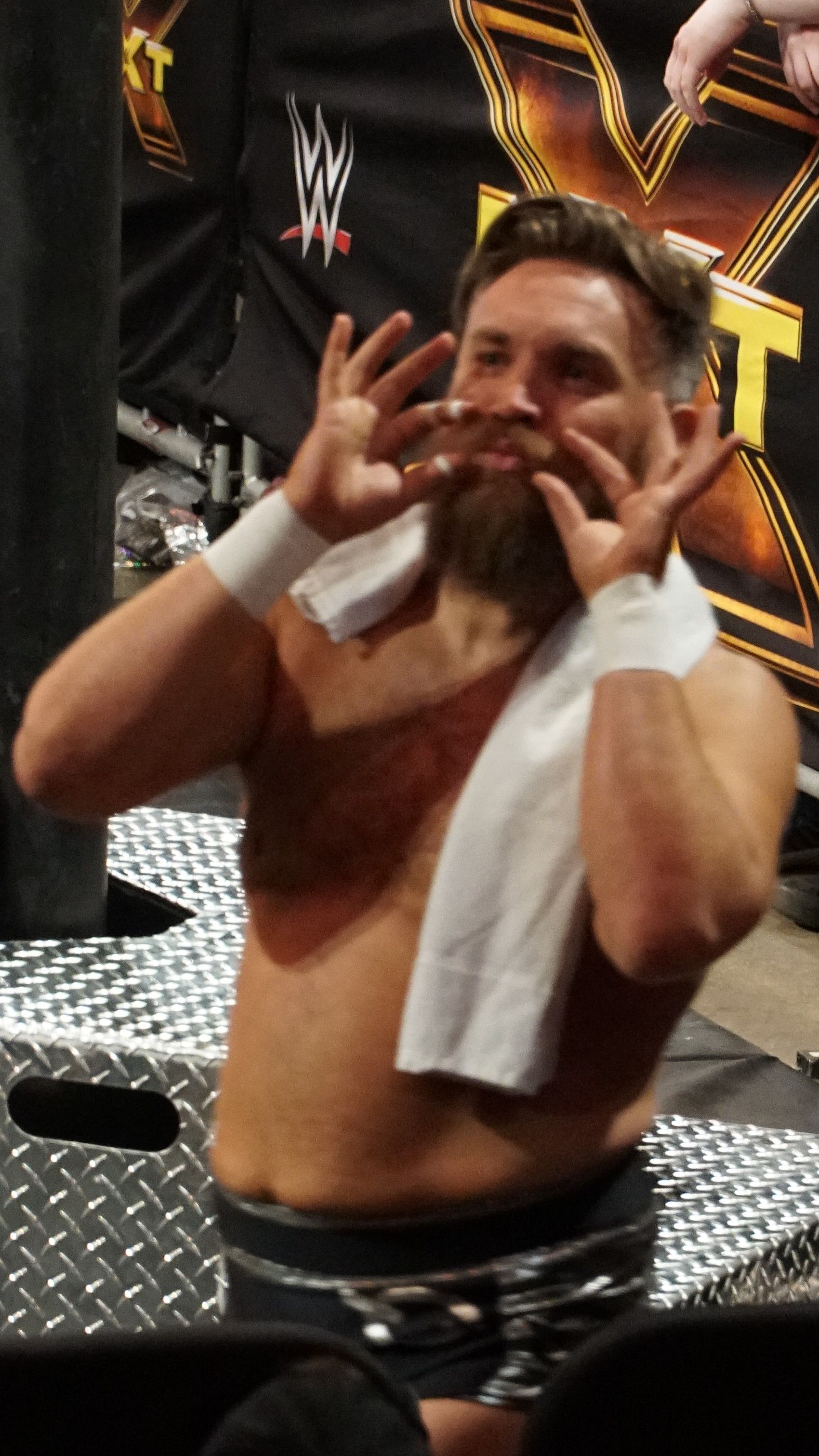
- Seven in 2018

Personal information
- Born: Benjamin Maurice Webb; 21 August 1981 (age 45) Wolverhampton, England

Professional wrestling career
- Ring name(s): Abuelo Santos Sr. Ben Webb; Trent Seven
- Billed height: 5 ft 11 in (180 cm)
- Billed weight: 245 lb (111 kg)
- Billed from: Moustache Mountain
- Trained by: Himself (Note: Unusually for a professional wrestler, Webb is self-taught.)
- Debut: 2010

Benjamin Maurice Webb (born 21 August 1981), known by the ring name Trent Seven, is an English professional wrestler and wrestling promoter. He is best known for his tenure with WWE from 2016 to 2022, where he performed primarily on their NXT UK brand. He has also performed for Total Nonstop Action Wrestling (TNA).

Seven and Tyler Bate formed the tag team Moustache Mountain, who also had won the Progress Tag Team Championship and the RPW Undisputed British Tag Team Championship in the UK, as well as the Chikara Campeonatos de Parejas in the US. Seven, Bate and Pete Dunne collectively form the team British Strong Style. Seven is also a former 1-time ICW World Heavyweight Champion.

== Early life ==
Benjamin Maurice Webb was born in Wolverhampton on 21 August 1981. He is of Irish descent, with his grandfather having left Menlough to settle in Wolverhampton's Tettenhall area. He aspired to be an actor until he watched WrestleMania, which made him want to become a wrestler instead. As a young boy, he and his friends would often wrestle each other in their back gardens. In 2008, at the relatively late age of 27, he decided to train for a career in professional wrestling; he purchased his own wrestling ring and taught himself, an unusual feat in the professional wrestling world.

== Professional wrestling career ==
=== Early career (2010–2012) ===
Webb made his debut at the age of 29 during an Alternative Wrestling World show in Birmingham in 2010 and adopted the ring name Trent Seven, a play on Severn Trent, the company that supplies water to the region of England where he was raised. In the subsequent years, he split his time between wrestling and a day job. In 2011 and 2012, he traveled to the U.S. to wrestle for Combat Zone Wrestling (CZW), losing on both occasions. He also traveled to Japan in 2012, working three shows for Big Japan Pro Wrestling, including a show at Korakuen Hall.

=== Fight Club Pro (2010–2020) ===
Seven was granted a match for the Ring of Honor World Championship during ROH's 2011 tour of the United Kingdom, but lost to defending champion Davey Richards on 15 July 2011 on a show promoted by Fight Club Pro (FCP). Sometime around 2011, Seven became the first holder of the FCP Championship, holding it until 25 November where he lost the title to Eddie Edwards. In 2013, he won FCP's annual "Infinity Trophy Tournament" when he defeated Mark Haskins in the finals. During an FCP show on 5 February 2016, Trent Seven unsuccessfully challenged Trevor Lee for the TNA X-Division Championship. On 7 January 2017, Moustache Mountain (Seven and Tyler Bate) teamed up with Joel Allen to defeat #CCK (Chris Brookes and Kid Lykos) and Shay Purser. With the win, Allen became the title holder of the Attack! 24:7 Championship, only for Allen to lose it the same night.

=== Chikara (2015–2017) ===
In early 2015, Seven, alongside Bate, debuted in the American promotion Chikara as part of their tour of the United Kingdom, defeating The Hunter Brothers in a dark match on 3 April and losing to the Devastation Corporation (Max Smashmaster and Blaster McMassive) in another dark match on 6 April. In their final dark match on the tour, Seven and Bate teamed with up with Clint Margera to take on Pete Dunne, Damian Dunne and Jimmy Havoc in a losing effort. Seven teamed with Bate and Dan Moloney at that year's King of Trios as Team Fight Club: Pro, making it to the semi-finals before being eliminated by the Bullet Club (AJ Styles, Matt Jackson and Nick Jackson).

In 2016, Seven and Bate began competing more regularly in Chikara. On 21 August they defeated Los Ice Creams (Hijo Del Ice Cream and Ice Cream Jr.), N_R_G (Hype Rockwell and Race Jaxon) and The Devastation Corporation to win the Chikara Campeonatos de Parejas. However, they were stripped of the title during Chikara's secret season 16.

Seven returned to Chikara on 1 September 2017, when he, Tyler Bate, and Pete Dunne, billed collectively as "House Strong Style", entered the 2017 King of Trios, defeating House Whitewolf (A-Kid, Adam Chase and Zayas) in their first round match. Over the next two days, House Strong Style defeated House Throwbacks (Dasher Hatfield, Mark Angelosetti and Simon Grimm) in the quarterfinals, House Rot (Frightmare, Hallowicked and Kobald) via forfeit in the semifinals and House Sendai Girls (Cassandra Miyagi, Dash Chisako and Meiko Satomura) in the finals to win the 2017 King of Trios.

=== Insane Championship Wrestling (2015–2016) ===
Seven made his debut for Insane Championship Wrestling in early 2015, facing Mikey Whiplash at the O2 Academy Birmingham. Throughout the rest of the year, Seven would be seen competing on ICW's tour shows around the UK, quickly becoming a fan favorite.

In 2016, after returning to enter the 5th Annual Square Go match, Seven challenged Big Damo for the ICW World Heavyweight Championship, before entering into a feud with Mikey Whiplash, eventually leading to a 6 man contest at Shug's Hoose Party 3, between Legion (Mikey Whiplash, Tommy End & Michael Dante) and Moustache Mountain & Lewis Girvan. After Trent picked up the win for his team, Whiplash, who had been campaigning to main event Fear & Loathing XI, stated that he believed Seven was the rightful challenger to the World Heavyweight Championship. In the months that followed, Seven, backed heavily by the ICW fans, campaigned for ICW GM Red Lightning to grant him a shot at the championship. After being disregarded by Lightning, Trent forced the GM to give him a match against Wolfgang at Fear & Loathing XI, with the title on the line inside a Steel Cage.

At Fear & Loathing XI, at The SSE Hydro, in front of the largest independent UK wrestling crowd for over 30 years, Seven faced Wolfgang in a Steel Cage match for the ICW World Heavyweight Championship. However, after being overcome with rage, Seven punched Wolfgang with his own knuckleduster on top of the cage, causing Wolfgang to fall to the floor, inadvertently winning the match. After earning himself one more shot at the title by defeating Chris Renfrew, Seven once again faced Wolfgang, at the O2 Academy Newcastle, at the 6th Annual Square Go event, and succeeded in becoming ICW World Heavyweight Champion.

Seven would remain ICW World Heavyweight Champion for two months, defending the title against the likes of BT Gunn, Pete Dunne, Jack Jester, and Jordan Devlin, before losing the title to Joe Coffey at Barramania III. After a few months away, Seven returned briefly at Shug's Hoose Party 4, facing BT Gunn, Wolfgang, and Pete Dunne in a four-way match for the WWE United Kingdom Championship; this match marked the first time the title had been defended on UK soil outside of a WWE ring.

Trent would not return to ICW until almost 18 months later, at Fear & Loathing XI, where he joined Pete Dunne and Tyler Bate in a losing effort against the team of Wolfgang, BT Gunn, and Noam Dar.

=== Progress Wrestling (2016–2019) ===
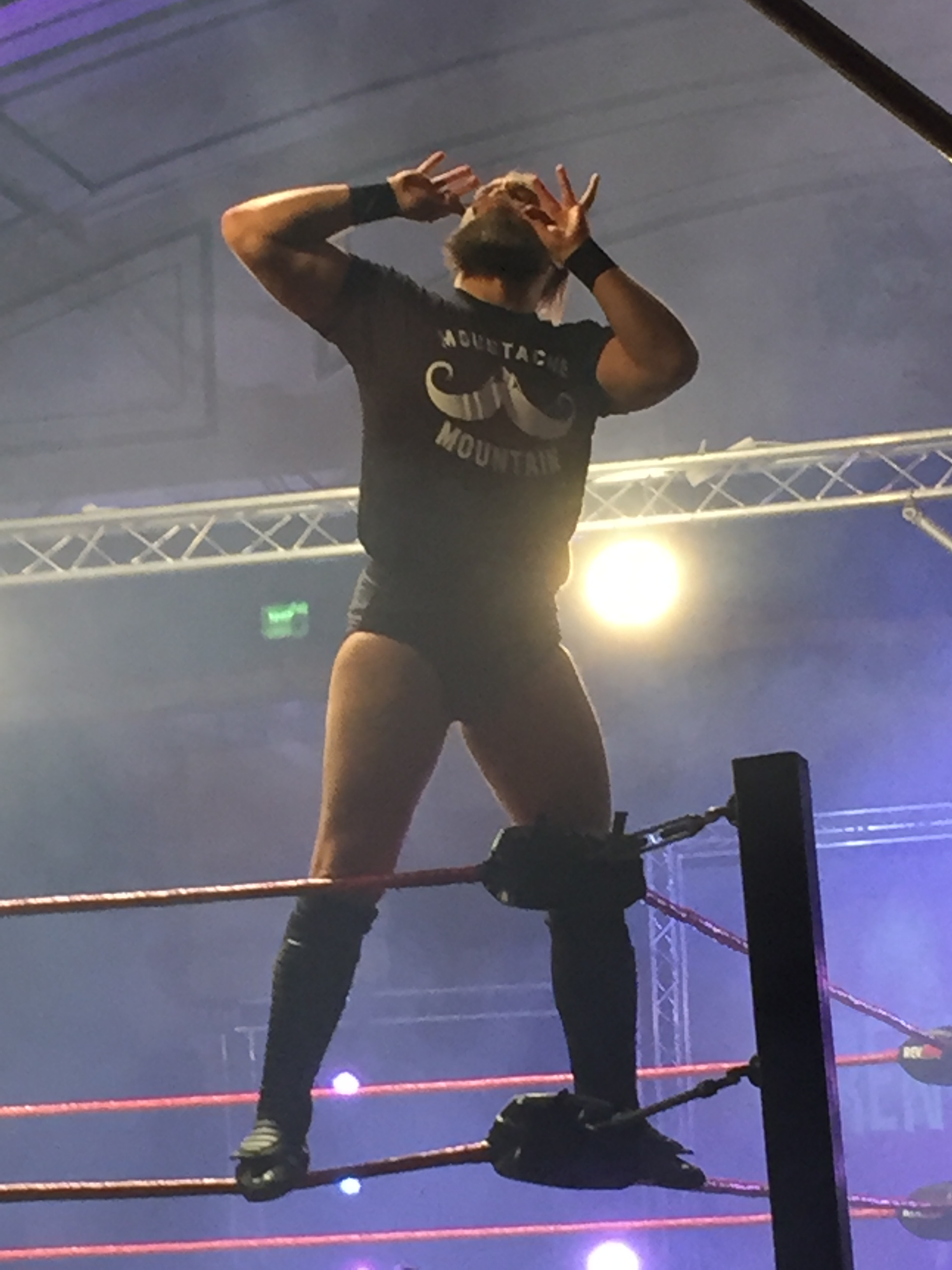
Seven posing in 2017

Seven debuted with Progress Wrestling at Chapter 28 alongside Tyler Bate, losing to Damian and Pete Dunne. Seven returned at Chapter 32, losing to Rampage Brown. At Chapter 33, Seven turned heel, attacking Bate and aligning himself with Dunne to form British Strong Style. At Chapter 36, Seven and Dunne defeated The London Riots (James Davis and Rob Lynch) to win the Progress Tag Team Championship, and successfully defended it in a rematch at Chapter 39. By virtue of winning that match, both Seven and Dunne were entered into a seven-man elimination match for the vacant Progress World Championship, which was eventually won by Dunne after Bate returned and attacked Jimmy Havoc, thus turning heel and aligning himself with Seven and Dunne. On 16 December, Seven and Dunne were stripped of the Progress Tag Team Championship after Dunne attempted to give his half of the shield to Bate. Two weeks later at Chapter 41, Seven and Bate defeated The London Riots and The LDRS of the New School (Marty Scurll and Zack Sabre Jr.) in a three-way tag team match to win the vacant titles.

Seven entered the Super Strong Style 16 Tournament in 2017, losing to Matt Riddle in the first round. On night 2, Seven and Dunne defeated David Starr and Pastor William Eaver and on night 3 Seven beat Mark Haskins in a submission match. After successful defending the tag team championship against teams such as the South Pacific Power Trip (TK Cooper and Travis Banks), and the Hunter Brothers, Seven and Bate eventually lost the title at Chapter 50 to #CCK, before winning it back less than a month later at Chapter 51. On 10 September, Seven and Bate lost the title to #CCK in a ladder match.

At Chapter 64, Seven participated in the Thunderbastard match winning by Morgan Webster while Seven was eliminated by TK Cooper. At Chapter 66, Moustache Mountain were unable to win back the Progress Tag Team Championships against Grizzled Young Veterans. At Chapter 76, Seven defeated Doug Williams to win the Progress Atlas Championship. On Chapter 78, Seven defeated Zack Gibson to retain the Progress Atlas Championship.

=== WWE (2016–2022) ===
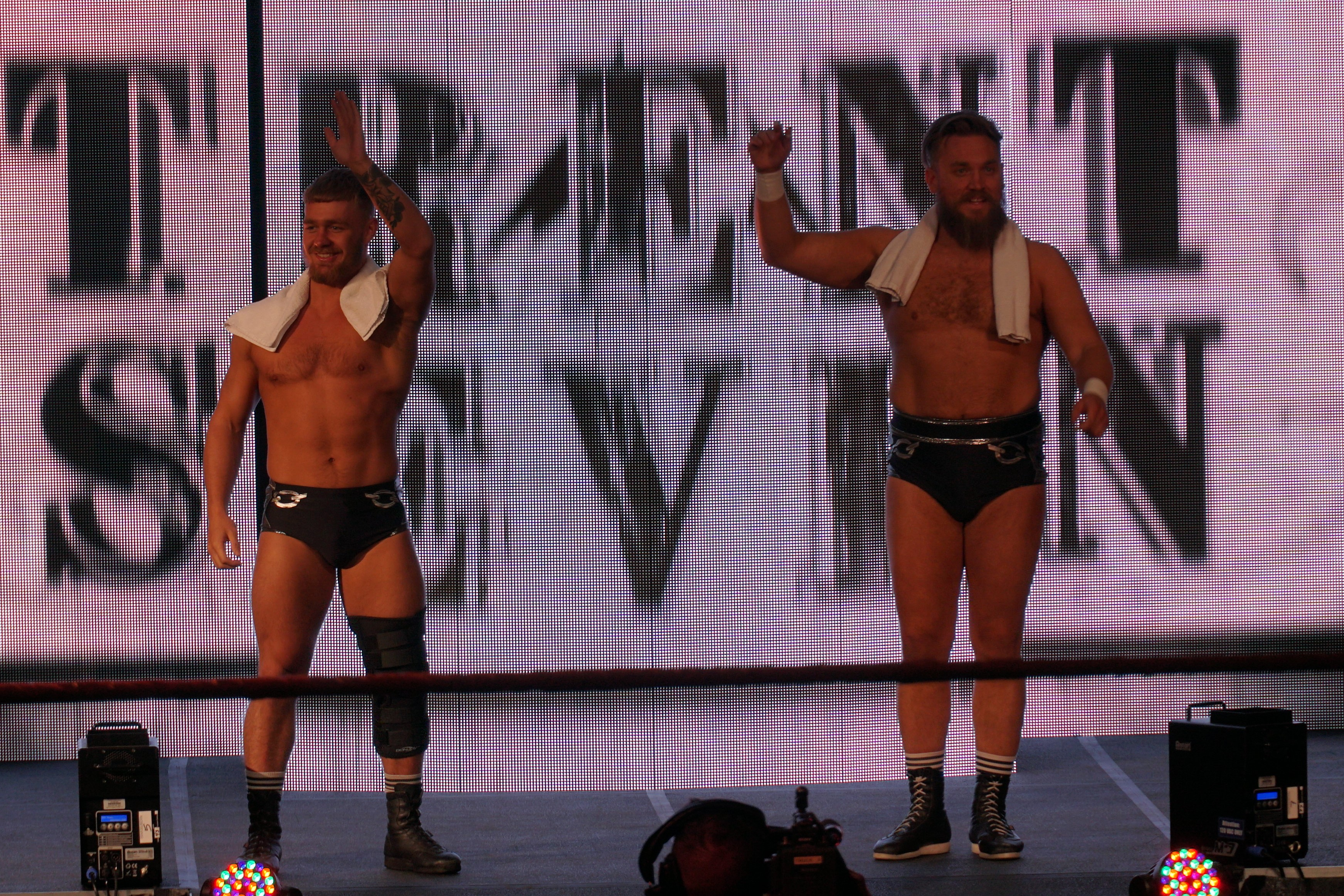
Seven (right) with British Strong Style partner Tyler Bate

On 15 December 2016, it was revealed that Seven would be one of 16 men competing in a two night tournament to crown the first-ever WWE United Kingdom Champion on 14 and 15 January 2017. Prior to the tournament, Seven, along with Pete Dunne were mentioned among the favorites to win the tournament. In the first round, Seven defeated HC Dyer to advance to the quarter-finals, where he was defeated by Wolfgang. Seven signed a contract with WWE, which allowed him to continue taking independent bookings with some restrictions. On 15 February, Seven made his debut in WWE's developmental territory NXT, unsuccessfully challenging Bate for the United Kingdom Championship.

On 11 November, Moustache Mountain defeated the team of Pete Dunne and Mark Andrews. On 6 December, Seven was defeated by Killian Dain in a #1 contender's qualifying match for the NXT Championship. On 18 June at the United Kingdom Championship Tournament, Seven reformed British Strong Style with Bate and Dunne to defeat The Undisputed Era (Adam Cole, Kyle O'Reilly, and Roderick Strong) in a six-man tag team match on 18 June. The following night, Mustache Mountain defeated O'Reilly and Strong to win the NXT Tag Team Championship, but lost the titles back to them two days at the 21 June NXT tapings (aired on 11 July) after Bate threw in the towel due to Seven's injured knee being targeted. After Seven's match with Zack Gibson on the 14 November episode of NXT UK, Gallus (Joe Coffey, Mark Coffey, and Wolfgang) would beat up Seven.

On 9 December 2021 episode of NXT UK, Moustache Mountain defeated Pretty Deadly (Lewis Howley and Sam Stoker) to win the NXT UK Tag Team Championship. On 2 June 2022 episode of NXT UK, Moustache Mountain lost the title against Ashton Smith and Oliver Carter. On 16 June episode of NXT UK, Seven attacked Bate, thus turning heel and disbanding the Moustache Mountain. On 18 August 2022, it was announced that Seven was released from his WWE contract.

=== All Elite Wrestling (2022) ===
Seven made his All Elite Wrestling debut on the 7 December episode of AEW Rampage. He lost an AEW All-Atlantic Championship match to Orange Cassidy.

=== Total Nonstop Action Wrestling (2023–2024) ===
Seven made his Impact Wrestling debut at Final Resolution on December 9, 2023, as Mike Bailey's mystery partner against The Rascalz (Zachary Wentz and Trey Miguel). After the match he signed with the company. After convincing Mike Bailey to put his X-Division championship on the line against Moose on the Nov. 7 edition of Impact, Bailey would go on to lose the X-Division championship. After the match Trent came out to console him, but ended up turning on Bailey and hitting him with a low blow, breaking up Speedball Mountain and turning heel in the process. Seven left TNA in December 2024.

== Acting career ==
Webb portrayed Hengist in Transformers: The Last Knight (2017).

== Personal life ==
Webb continues to reside in his native Wolverhampton. Like his British Strong Style teammates Pete Dunne and Tyler Bate, he became a vegan after watching the documentary Cowspiracy (2014).

His brother is fellow professional wrestler and sometimes tag team partner, Clint Margera.

== Filmography ==
=== Television ===
Year	Title	Role	Channel
2021–2022	WWE The Run-In	Co-Host	BT Sport

== Championships and accomplishments ==
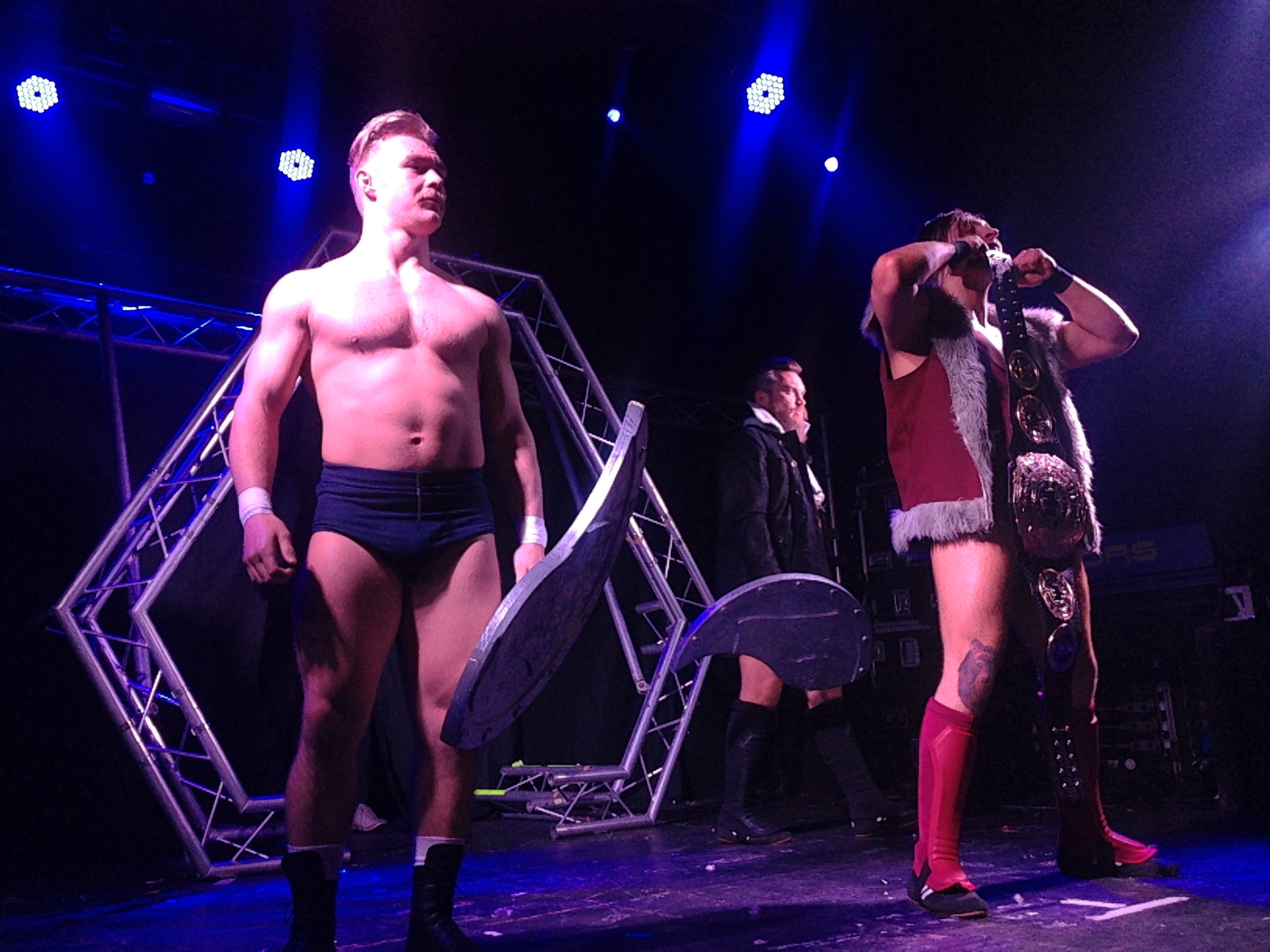
Seven (back) holding the Progress Tag Team Championship shield with his British Strong Style partners Tyler Bate (left) and Pete Dunne (front)

- Attack! Pro Wrestling
  - Attack! 24:7 Championship (1 time)
  - Attack! Tag Team Championship (1 time) – with Tyler Bate
- Banger Zone Wrestling
  - BZW Championship (1 time)
- Chikara
  - Chikara Campeonatos de Parejas (1 time) – with Tyler Bate
  - King of Trios (2017) – with Pete Dunne and Tyler Bate
- Fight Club: Pro
  - FCP Championship (1 time)
  - FCP Tag Team Championship (1 time) – with Tyler Bate
  - Infinity Trophy (2013)
- Destiny World Wrestling
  - DWW Championship (1 time)
- Insane Championship Wrestling
  - ICW World Heavyweight Championship (1 time)
- Infinite Promotions
  - Infinite World Championship (1 time, current)
- International Wrestling Syndicate
  - IWS World Tag Team Championship (1 time) – with Tyler Bate
- No Mercy Wrestling
  - No Mercy Wrestling Championship (1 time, current)
- NORTH Wrestling
  - NORTH Tag Team Championship (1 time) – with Client Margera
- Over the Top Wrestling
  - OTT World Championship (1 time)
  - OTT No Limits Championship (2 times)
  - OTT Tag Team Championship (2 times) – with Tyler Bate (1) and Sammy D (1)
  - OTT European Championship (1 time)
- Primos Wrestling Canada
  - Primos Wrestling 204 Championship (1 time)
- Pro Wrestling Illustrated
  - Ranked No. 111 of the top 500 singles wrestlers in the PWI 500 in 2019
- Progress Wrestling
  - Progress Tag Team Championship (3 times) – with Pete Dunne (1) and Tyler Bate (2)
  - Progress Atlas Championship (1 time)
- RISE Underground Pro Wrestling
  - RISE Championship (1 time)
- Revolution Pro Wrestling
  - RPW Undisputed British Tag Team Championship (1 time) – with Tyler Bate
- TNT Extreme Wrestling
  - IGNition Rumble (2026)
- Wrestling GO!
  - Wrestling GO! 24/7 Watermelon Championship (2 times)
- WWE
  - NXT UK Tag Team Championship (1 time) – with Tyler Bate
  - NXT Tag Team Championship (1 time) – with Tyler Bate
  - NXT Tag Team Championship Invitational (2018) – with Tyler Bate
