= Tucker (Northern Irish wrestler) =

Northern Irish professional wrestler

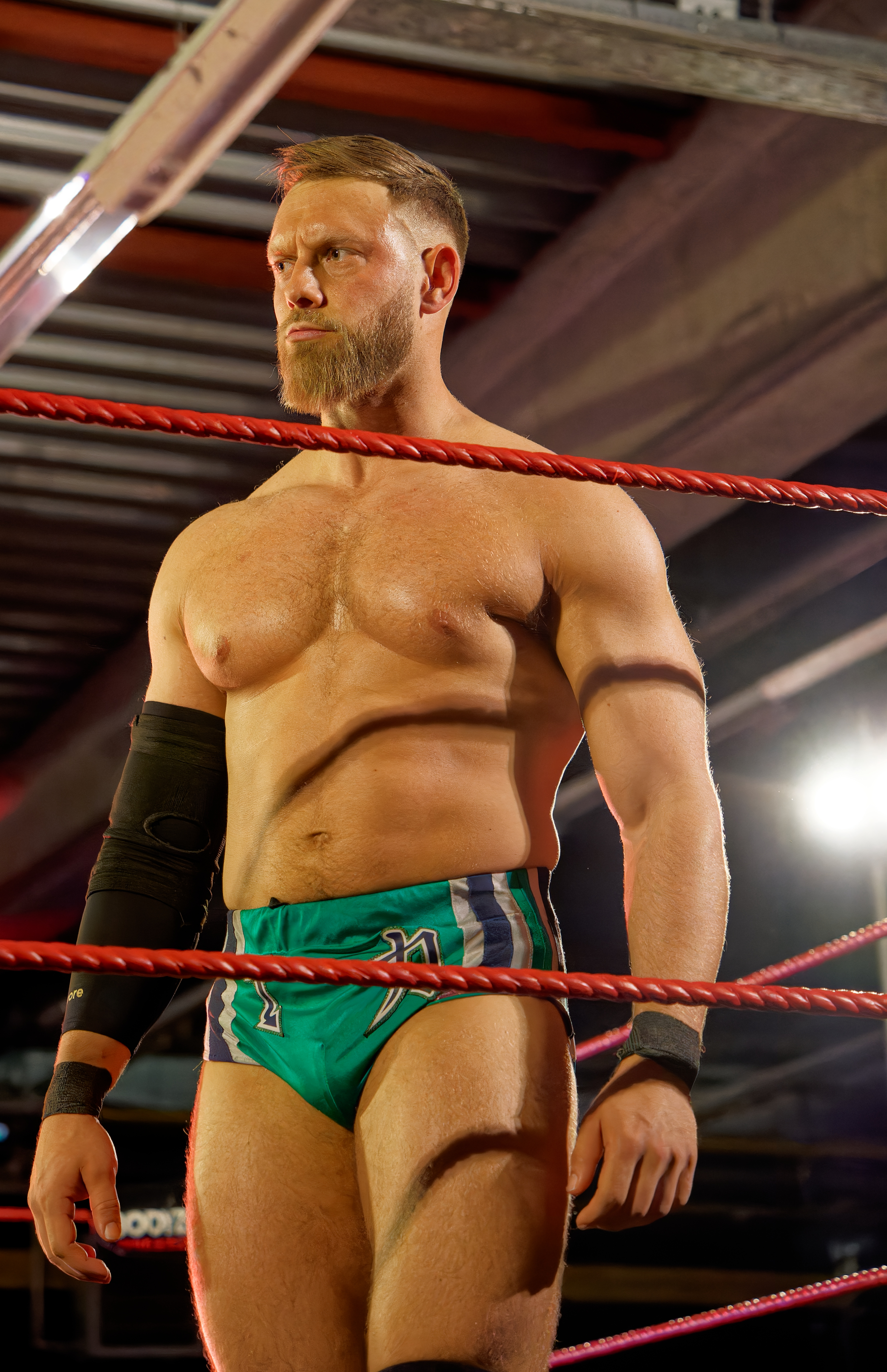
- Gallagher in May 2023

Personal information
- Born: Paul Gallagher; 5 April 1990 (age 36) Belfast, Northern Ireland

Professional wrestling career
- Ring name: Tucker
- Billed height: 1.73 m (5 ft 8 in)
- Billed weight: 87 kg (192 lb)
- Billed from: Belfast, Northern Ireland
- Trained by: Fergal Devitt; Paul Tracey
- Debut: 2006

Paul Gallagher (born 5 April 1990), better known by his ring name Tucker, is a Northern Irish professional wrestler, who is currently working in the independent circuit.

== Professional wrestling career ==
Tucker made his debut on the European independent circuit in 2006. In his country of Northern Ireland, Tucker competed for Pro Wrestling Ulster. and WWE under the name, Ribby, a rib mascot used during the NXT 7th anniversary

=== WWE (2017–2018) ===
Tucker was a competitor in the United Kingdom Championship Tournament. Tucker faced Tyler Bate in the main event of day 1, where he was eliminated. He was brought back for the following year's United Kingdom Championship Tournament, but lost to Joe Coffey in the first round.

After being used as an enhancement talent in the newly created brand NXT UK, losing against likes of Ashton Smith, Jordan Devlin and Eddie Dennis; on 14 December, he was released from his contract.

=== Independent circuit (2018–present) ===
Tucker currently competes in Belfast promotion Titanic Wrestling where he is currently a trainer at the training school known as The Yard.

He also competes in the French promotion AYA Catch. He became AYA Catch Champion on 19 February 2020, defeating Rafael Belmont and Tristan Archer. He lost the title on 30 April 2022 against Tayel Machete. He has for now the longest reign as champion in the promotion.

== Championships and accomplishments ==
- AYA Catch
  - AYA Catch Championship (1 time)
- Catch As Catch Can
  - CACC Supreme Championship (1 time)
- Fight Factory Pro Wrestling
  - Irish Junior Heavyweight Championship (1 time)
- Pro Wrestling Ulster
  - PWU Championship (3 times)
  - PWU All-Ulster Championship (1 time)
  - PWU All-Ulster Title Tournament (2011)
- Superstar Wrestling
  - Superstar Wrestling Championship (1 time)
- Slam Wrestling Finland
  - George Hackenschmidt Invitational Cup (2022)
- Titanic Wrestling
  - Titanic Championship (1 time)
