= Mark Andrews (wrestler) =

Welsh professional wrestler (born 1992)

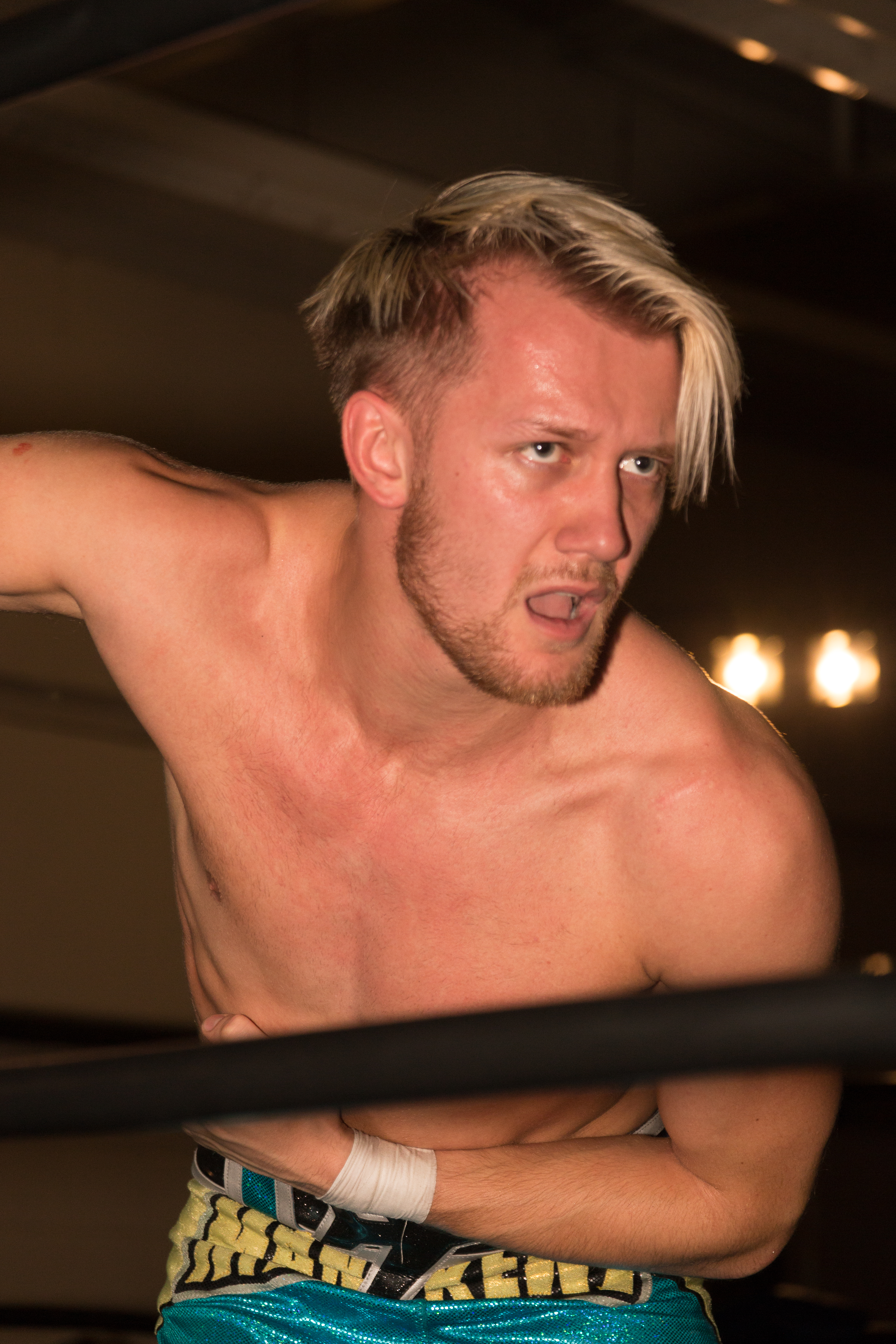
- Andrews in 2015

Personal information
- Born: 25 January 1992 (age 34) Cardiff, Wales

Professional wrestling career
- Ring name(s): Lightning Kid; Mandrews; Mandrews Tarver; Mark Andrews
- Billed height: 5 ft 8 in (1.73 m)
- Billed weight: 147 lb (67 kg)
- Billed from: Cardiff, Wales
- Debut: 2006

Mark Andrews (born 25 January 1992) is a Welsh professional wrestler and musician, currently performing on the British independent scene and for Revolution Pro Wrestling (RevPro), where he and stablemate Flash Morgan Webster are former Undisputed British Tag Team Champions.

He previously wrestled for WWE, where he and Webster were the first Welsh Champions in WWE history during their reign as NXT UK Tag Team Champions. He had a previous stint in Impact Wrestling – then known as Total Nonstop Action Wrestling (TNA) – in the mid-2010s under the ring name Mandrews.

As a musician, Andrews is the bassist and co-lead vocalist of the pop punk band Junior.

== Professional wrestling career ==
=== Independent circuit (2006–2016, 2022–present) ===
Andrews started training at the age of 13, upon discovery of the NWA Wales training school in Newport. As well as training there under Edd Ferris, Andrews would travel to Kent three times a year to attend NWA UK Hammerlock's training camps, where he learned off the likes of John Ryan, Paul Tracey and Andre Baker. It is here that he met Zack Sabre Jr., who later became Andrews's mentor.

It was for NWA Wales that Andrews made his wrestling debut, appearing in a battle royal in 2006. Shortly afterwards, Andrews began competing under a mask, using the name "The Lightning Kid". He has stated that this was to hide his young age from audiences. Andrews' rise as The Lightning Kid was gradual, with most his appearances in 2006 and 2007 limited to promotions in South Wales. His first appearance outside Wales was at the 2007 Holbrooks Festival in Coventry, where he first met his long-time friend (and wrestling rival), Pete Dunne.

January 2008 saw Andrews make his first international appearance, when he was flown out to Madrid to compete for La Super Wrestling Alliance (SWA).

In 2009, Andrews first began to gain exposure on Britain's independent wrestling scene, making appearances for British Championship Wrestling and Premier British Wrestling; where he competed against Noam Dar. In November 2009, Andrews wrestled at IPW:UK's event in Chatham, Kent, against Zack Sabre Jr.

In 2010, Andrews started to appear regularly for Coventry-based Triple X Wrestling. He appeared as part of a stable called "The NexXxus", a parody of the "Nexus" faction in the WWE. Under the name "Mandrews Tarver", Andrews joined fellow 'rookies' Wade Helix (Helix), Hitch Sheffield (Wild Boar), Phil Otunga (Phil Ward) and Gav Gabriel (Morgan Webster) as the group ambushed and attacked various members of the roster. On 15 October 2010, Andrews challenged Andy Wild for the SPWO UK Championship in a losing effort.

In 2011, Andrews debuted for Insane Championship Wrestling in Glasgow, attempted to qualify for the Union of European Wrestling Alliances European Cruiserweight Championship tournament and competed at Premier British Wrestling's annual "King of Cruisers" six-way match in Irevine.

Andrews also made two appearances for the newly reformed Frontier Wrestling Alliance, which included an encounter against long-time rival Wild Boar at Thorpe Park.

Andrews started to make appearances for Preston City Wrestling, where he twice came up short in encounters for Bubblegum's PCW Cruiserweight Championship, including in a three-way match that also included Austin Aries. Andrews' match against Kris Travis at "PCW SuperShow 4" was nominated for "UK Match of the Year" in the Fighting Spirit Magazine Reader Awards 2014, the second year running Andrews had been nominated for the honour.

In Attack! Pro Wrestling, Andrews continued heavy involvement in the creative direction of the organisation. May saw Andrews reprise his role as Pikachu, as Attack! presented the second instalment of their popular video game themed shows, "Press Start Level 2". Taking on Arthur Klauser-Saxon (Tyler Bate), who was styled as Machoke, Andrews picked up the win to gain the hold of the 24:7 Championship for a second time. As with his first reign, he did not hold the title for long – with T-Bone winning the title almost immediately, styled as Bowser. At the following show, "The Weird And Wonderful World of Attack! Pro Wrestling", Andrews again regained the title, defeating current holders Sam Bailey and Zack Gibson in a soccer-themed tag team match, alongside Pete Dunne. For a third time, Andrews lost the title almost as quickly as he had won it, with Lana Austin and Nixon Newell striking the same evening to take the belt.

Andrews also made another short trip to the US independents in 2014, which included a dark match appearance at DREAMWAVE's "Good As Gold" event in LaSalle, Illinois. In addition to the USA trip, Andrews also made his debut for Germany's award-winning Westside Xtreme Wrestling. Appearing on the Mülheim leg of the "wXw Drive of Champions Tour", Andrews teamed with Pete Dunne and Chris Brookes, losing out to Big Daddy Walter, Axel Dieter Jr. and Da Mack.

Andrews' most successful year-to-date earned him three nominations at the Fighting Spirit Magazine Reader Awards 2014, where he was shortlisted for "Best UK Wrestler" and "Best UK Tag Team" (with Eddie Dennis), alongside his "UK Match of the Year" nomination for his PCW encounter against Kris Travis. Meanwhile, the online message board UKFF voted Andrews the 3rd best wrestler in the UK, with a series of complimentary comments, including: "Mark's the poster boy of the resurgence British wrestling is seeing at the moment. Talented, likeable, and genuinely cool."

After signing a contract with Total Nonstop Action Wrestling, it was confirmed that Andrews would be moving stateside. Andrews' "home" promotion, Attack! Pro Wrestling, hosted a farewell show on 24 January 2015. Titled "Mandrews Goes To America", the show was held at Cathays Community Centre in Cardiff, a small venue just minutes from where Andrews grew up. Headlined by the promise of Andrews vs his long-time friend Pete Dunne, tickets for the show sold out in under 15 minutes. At the event, Andrews defeated Dunne who viciously attacked Andrews afterwards.

In early 2016, Andrews and Nixon Newell formed the tag team Bayside High and on 27 March 2016 defeated #CCK (Chris Brookes and Kid Lykos) for the Attack! Tag Team Trophy Championship in a Ladder match. They lost the titles to #CCK on 21 August 2016 at a rematch in Cardiff.

=== Chikara (2011–2015) ===
In August 2011, Andrews travelled to Pennsylvania, to make his debut for Chikara. Granted a place in the Young Lions Cup IX, Andrews' first round match was a four-way eliminator, taking on Tadasuke, Nick Jackson and Sean South. Tadasuke won the match, last eliminating Andrews on the route to victory.

In 2014, he appeared in Chikara's yearly King of Trios tournament as Team UK with Pete Dunne and Damian Dunne. The team defeated The Bloc Party in the first round, advancing to the quarter-finals, where they were then felled by The Devastation Corporation. On the third night of the tournament, Andrews appeared in singles action, defeating Oliver Grimsly.

Andrews was part of Chikara's first ever tour of the UK, gaining a victory over Silver Ant at the show of 31 April 2015 in Cardiff, Wales. For the second year running, he took part in Chikara's King of Trios tournament, teaming with 'Flash' Morgan Webster and Pete Dunne as Team Attack. They lost their first round match against the League of Nations. However, during that weekend Andrews also competed for Chikara's annual Rey de Voladores title, winning the tournament by defeating Shynron in the finals.

=== Progress Wrestling (2012–2022) ===
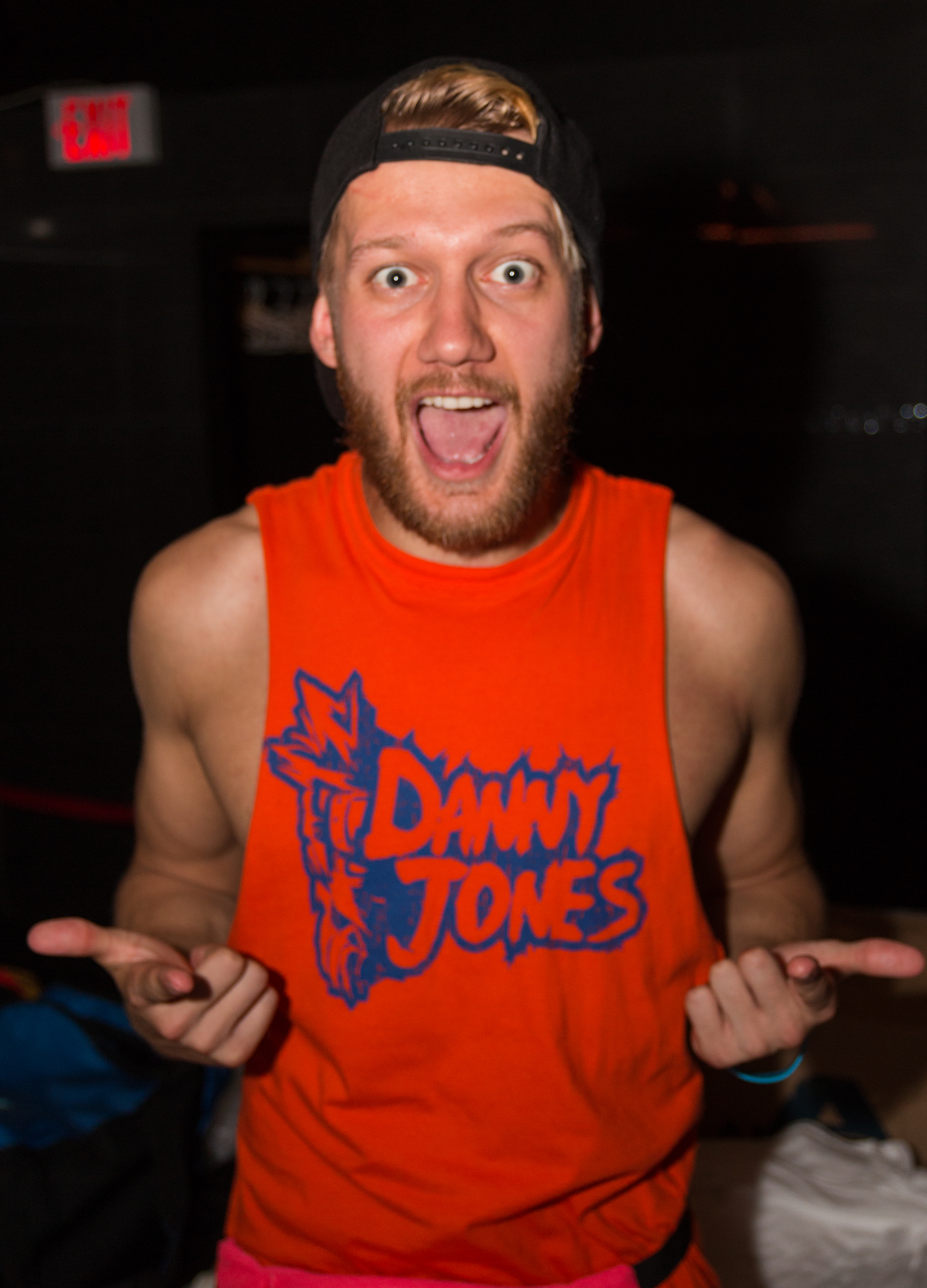
Andtews in 2016

In 2012, Andrews debuted for Progress Wrestling at Chapter 2, defeating Wild Boar Mike Hitchman. Andrews returned at Chapter 3 where he was victorious over Xander Cooper, before then entering the inaugural National Progression Series tournament. In his first-round match at Chapter 4, Andrews defeated Will Ospreay. Both men received a standing ovation from the Progress fans after the match.

In 2013, Andrews won the Natural Progression Series, defeating Jonathan Windsor in the second round and Paul Robinson in the final, claiming the trophy and a guaranteed title shot. Andrews cashed in his shot that evening, defeating Rampage Brown to win the title. However, the reign was short lived, as Jimmy Havoc cashed in another guaranteed title shot that same evening, stealing the title after a series of chair shots.

Andrews received a re-match for the Progress Championship at Chapter 13, which he ultimately lost after interference from Paul Robinson. Over the course of the year, Andrews also teamed with friend Eddie Dennis, entering the Progress Tag Team Championship tournament held at Chapters 11 and 12. The pair, known as FSU, won the tournament and were crowned the promotion's first-ever tag team champions. This made Andrews Progress' first ever Triple Crown champion, having won the Natural Progression Series, the Progress Championship and the Progress Tag Team Championship. Eddie and Andrews successfully defended the titles a further two times in 2014

In January 2015, at Andrews' last Progress show before beginning work for TNA in America, he and Eddie Dennis were scheduled to face each other for sole possession of the tag team titles. However, the pair were attacked by villainous stable the Faceless, causing an impromptu match to ensue for the tag team titles which the Faceless won. Andrews and Dennis then faced off in a match during the second half of the show, which Andrews lost.

Andrews returned to Progress in November 2015, saving Progress Champion Will Ospreay from a post-match beating by Paul Robinson. Andrews then requested a title shot, pointing out that when the two had previously faced each other in Progress, Ospreay hadn't won either of their lauded matches. Andrews subsequently lost his granted title match against Ospreay at the January 2016 show, though the match achieved the number six spot on the Top 10 Progress Matches of 2015 as voted for by the Progress fans.

Andrews subsequently became embroiled in a feud with the Origin – the stable previously known as the Faceless – teaming with Eddie Dennis and Jack Gallagher at the first ever Progress show in Manchester, losing a six-man tag team match to the Origin team of Dave Mastiff, Nathan Cruz and El Ligero. Andrews and Dennis, as FSU, were then granted two shots at the tag team titles in early 2016, including a no disqualification match, both of which they lost to Cruz and Ligero.

In May 2016, Andrews entered Progress's Super Strong Style 16 Tournament for the first time, losing in the first round to Chris Hero. However, as Mark Haskins had to drop out due to illness, Andrews won Haskins' spot in the tournament via a ten-man scramble match. He went on to beat Mikey Whiplash in the quarter-finals and Zack Gibson in the semi-finals, before losing to Tommy End in the tournament final. During the PROGRESS vs. Smash Wrestling event in September 2016, Andrews competed at all three shows – losing to Brent Banks and winning matches against Scotty O'Shea and Kevin Bennett. At Chapter Thirty-Six at the Brixton Academy, Andrews teamed with Eddie Dennis, Jack Gallagher and Damon Moser in a losing effort against the Origin (Nathan Cruz, El Ligero, Dave Mastiff & Zack Gibson). At Chapter 38, Andrews and Matt Cross wrestled for the number one contendership for the Smash Wrestling Championship, a match Cross won.

Andrews became number one contender for the Progress World Championship in January 2017, by winning the Thunderbastard match against seven other opponents at Chapter 43. Andrews faced Pete Dunne in a losing effort for the title at Chapter 46 and also lost when facing Tyler Bate for the WWE UK Championship at the Progress Orlando show held in March 2017 over Wrestlemania weekend in Florida. After Andrews and Mark Haskins fought to a draw for the number one contendership for the Progress Championship at Chapter 47, they both faced Pete Dunne in a three-way match for the title at Chapter 48 where Dunne was victorious. At 2017's Super Strong Style 16 Tournament, Andrews lost in the first round to Flamita.

At Chapter 55, held at Alexandra Palace, Andrews won an 8-Man Scramble Match, again becoming the number contender for the Progress World Championship before being attacked by long-time tag team partner Eddie Dennis. At Chapter 57, Andrews unsuccessfully challenged Travis Banks for the Progress World Title. At Chapter 62, Andrews teams with Danny Jones losing to Jimmy Havoc and Mark Haskins. At chapter 63, Andrews defeated Morgan Webster. At Chapter 64, Andrews participated in the 2018 Thunderbastard match, the match was won by Webster while Andrews was eliminated by Tyler Bate. At Chapter 66, Andrews was defeated by Pete Dunne in a match that also involved Morgan Webster. Andrews then entered to the 2018 Super Strong Style 16, being eliminated by Angelico in the first round. At Progress Hello Wembley, Andrews wrestled against his former tag team partner Eddie Dennis in a Tables, ladders and chairs match, with Andrews being defeated.

=== Total Nonstop Action Wrestling (2014–2017) ===
Andrews competed in a dark match against DJ Z in a losing effort on 7 September 2014 during an Impact Wrestling taping from Fayetteville, North Carolina. In October 2014 Andrews participated in TNA British Boot Camp. After making it into the finals of the competition and ultimately winning, he earned himself a Total Nonstop Action Wrestling contract.

Andrews made his Impact Wrestling television debut on 23 January 2015 episode during a brawl that involved Ethan Carter III and Jeremy Borash, where he jumped from the crowd to help Jeremy and Rockstar Spud push away Ethan and his bodyguard Tyrus. Andrews made his in-ring debut a week later under his Mandrews nickname, teaming up with Spud to defeat The BroMans (Robbie E & Jessie Godderz). He continued to aid Rockstar Spud and Jeremy Borash in their feud with Ethan Carter III and Tyrus, which included Spud and Mandrews losing a Six Sides of Steel Two on One Handicap match to Tyrus at Lockdown 2015. at Destination X (2015), Mandrews competed in a Three-way TNA X Division Championship tournament match which was won by Tigre Uno.

Mandrews was included as a participant in the TNA World Title Series as a member of "Group X Division." However he was unable to win any of the matches he took part in against the other members, receiving zero points and not advancing in the tournament as a result.

At One Night Only: Live!, Mandrews competed in a Four-Way elimination match for the TNA X Division Championship which was won by Tigre Uno. At Joker's Wild 2016, Mandrews and Tigre Uno defeated Robbie E and Jessie Godderz to qualify for the Gauntlet Battle Royal match later that night and that match was won by Drew Galloway.

In early 2016, Andrews was part of TNA's Maximum Impact tour of the UK. He was called out by Mike Bennett during 16 February Manchester show and took exception to Bennett's patronising praise, subsequently losing a match to him. During 2016, he participated at many X Division match, in a losing effort. at X-Travaganza 2016, Mandrews lost to Marshe Rockett. at Destination X (2016), Mandrews competed in a Six-man Ladder match to determine the #1 contender for the TNA X Division Championship which was won by DJZ. at Against All Odds, Mandrews lost to Andrew Everett. On 6 October episode of Impact Wrestling, Mandrews took part in a new TNA concept called Team X Gold, teaming with Braxton Sutter and DJZ, with the team known as "Go for Broke." They would defeat The Helms Dynasty and Marshe Rockett. On 24 November episode of Impact Wrestling, the team defeated The Helms Dynasty and Marshe Rockett and Rockstar Spud and Decay in a three-way tag team elimination match for number one contendership for the TNA X Division Championship.

On 1 December episode of Impact Wrestling, Mandrews, DJZ and Braxton Sutter faced each other for the X Division Championship, where Mandrews was close to winning after hitting the shooting star press, when DJZ was able to get the pin on Mandrews to retain his championship. When both Mandrews and Sutter helped an injured DJZ, Mandrews attacked DJZ while yelling at Sutter, thus beginning Mandrews' first heel run in the company.

On 5 January 2017, it was reported that Mandrews' TNA contract had expired at the end of 2016 and that he had left the company. Mandrews had his final match in TNA on the edition of 8 December of Impact Wrestling defeating Aiden O'Shea.

=== Pro Wrestling Guerrilla (2015–2016) ===
On 28 August 2015 Andrews made his debut for Pro Wrestling Guerrilla (PWG) by entering the 2015 Battle of Los Angeles tournament, losing to Will Ospreay in his first round match. At December's All Star Weekend 11, he lost to Chuck Taylor on Night 1 and to Ricochet on Night 2. After losing to Roderick Strong at All Star Weekend 12 Night 1 in March 2016, Andrews scored his first PWG victory by beating Player Uno on Night 2. At Prince on 20 May, Andrews lost to Marty Scurll. At the 2016 Battle of Los Angeles, Andrews beat Pete Dunne in the first round and Chris Hero in the quarter-finals but lost to Trevor Lee in the semi-finals.

=== WWE ===
==== Early appearances (2017–2018) ====
On 5 January 2017, Andrews was announced as part of the WWE United Kingdom Championship Tournament. Andrews defeated Dan Moloney in the first round, advancing to the quarter-finals. The second night of the tournament, Andrews defeated Joseph Conners, advancing to the semi-finals where he was defeated by Pete Dunne. On the 22 February episode of NXT, Andrews lost his NXT debut to Dunne. On 7 November 2017, Andrews teamed with Cedric Alexander, defeating Joseph Conners and James Drake on 205 Live. On the 6 February 2018 edition of 205 Live, Andrews announced his participation in the WWE Cruiserweight Championship Tournament, where he defeated Akira Tozawa in the first round, but Andrews lost to Drew Gulak in the second round on 6 March 2018 which eliminated him from the WWE Cruiserweight Championship Tournament. On the 29 November episode of NXT, Andrews and Pete Dunne lost to Trent Seven and Tyler Bate.

On the 27 March 2018 edition of 205 Live, Andrews defeated Tony Nese, confirming his rematch against Gulak for the 205 Live episode after WrestleMania weekend. Andrews would lose the rematch and was attacked after the match by Gulak until Tony Nese made the save. On the 7 November episode of 205 Live, Andrews was defeated by the Cruiserweight champion Buddy Murphy.

==== Formation of Subculture (2018–2022) ====
On 17 October, on the first episode of NXT UK, Andrews was defeated by Joe Coffey and was attacked after the match by both Joe and Mark Coffey until Morgan Webster made the save. On 29 October 2018, Andrews defeated Wolfgang, after the match Andrews was again attacked by the Coffey Brothers with Webster making the save, however Wolfgang turn on them and joined the Coffeys in the attack.

In a triple threat tag team match at NXT UK TakeOver: Cardiff, Andrews along with Flash Morgan Webster captured the NXT UK Tag Team Championship after defeating James Drake and Zack Gibson to win the titles and become the first Welsh champions in WWE history. After successfully defending the titles against Drake and Gibson, they lost the titles against Gallus (Mark Coffey & Wolfgang) on the 17 October episode of NXT UK.

In June 2021 vignettes started appearing on WWE social media and NXT UK programming featuring Andrews, his tag team partner Flash Morgan Webster, and Dani Luna. The vignettes would focus on each of the individuals unique looks and passions for their music genres. In the coming weeks the group would be given a new entrance and theme music and start working together under the name "Subculture".

On 18 August 2022, Andrews was released from his WWE contract.

=== Return to Impact Wrestling / TNA (2023–2024) ===
On the May 12, 2023 episode of Impact!, it was announced that Andrews and Flash Morgan Webster (accompanied by Dani Luna) will challenge the Impact World Tag Team Champions ABC (Ace Austin and Chris Bey). On May 26 at Under Siege, Andrews and Webster failed to win the titles from ABC. It was later on announced that Andrews and Webster would return to Impact to participate in a four-way match for the World Tag Team Championship against ABC, Brian Myers and Moose, and Rich Swann and Sami Callihan at Slammiversary of year 2023. During this match the two were successful.

== Musical career ==
Mark Andrews
- Instruments: Vocals, Guitar, Bass Guitar
- Years active: 2014–present

Andrews plays in a pop-punk band called Junior where he is the co-lead vocalist and bassist. They have released 2 EPs, a split EP with Fierce Morgan and released their debut album "Beautiful Life" in August 2019. Several wrestlers have featured in their music videos, including Matt Hardy (in his "Broken" persona) and Tegan Nox.

== Personal life ==
After studying GCSEs and A Levels at Cardiff High School, Andrews attended the University of Glamorgan. Andrews is the co-founder of "Defend Indy Wrestling", a clothing brand for independent wrestling fans. Inspired by the "DEFEND Pop Punk" message propagated by American band Man Overboard, Andrews created the brand in 2011 with fellow Welsh wrestler Eddie Dennis and English wrestler Pete Dunne, producing t-shirts, hoodies and other accessories.

== Championships and accomplishments ==
- Attack! Pro Wrestling
  - Attack! 24:7 Championship (5 times)
  - Attack! Tag Team Trophy Championship (1 time) – with Nixon Newell
  - Elder Stein Invitational (2011)
- Burning Heart Pro Wrestling
  - Burning Heart Tag Team Championship (1 time) – with Eddie Dennis
- Celtic Wrestling
  - CW Tag Team Championship (1 time) – with Tommy Dean
  - Halloween Tournament (2008)
- Riot Cabaret Pro Wrestling
  - Riot Cabaret World Championship (1 time)
- Chikara
  - Rey de Voladores (2015)
- Combat Sports Federation
  - CSF All-Nations Heavyweight Championship (1 time)
- Dragon Pro Wrestling
  - All Wales Championship (1 time)
- Fight! Nation Wrestling
  - FNW British Championship (1 time)
  - FNW British Title Tournament (2016)
- Pro Wrestling Illustrated
  - PWI ranked him 165 of the top 500 singles wrestlers in the PWI 500 in 2016
- Progress Wrestling
  - Progress World Championship (1 time)
  - Progress Tag Team Championship (1 time) – with Eddie Dennis
  - Natural Progression Series (2013)
  - Progress Tag Team Title Tournament (2013–14) – with Eddie Dennis
  - Thunderbastard (2017)
- Revolution Pro Wrestling
  - Undisputed British Tag Team Championship (1 time) – with Flash Morgan Webster
- Total Nonstop Action Wrestling / Impact Wrestling
  - TNA British Boot Camp 2
  - Impact World Tag Team Championship (1 time) – with Flash Morgan Webster
- WWE
  - NXT UK Tag Team Championship (1 time) – with Flash Morgan Webster
- Unlimited Wrestling
  - Unlimited Tag Team Championship (1 time) – with Flash Morgan Webster
- Other Title
  - BWC Scarlo Scholarship Championship (1 time)

== Discography ==
=== Junior ===
==== Albums ====
- Beautiful Life (2019).

==== EPs ====
- Split EP (with Fierce Morgan) (2016).
- Juniorland (2015).
- This Town Sucked Anyways (2014).
