= NXT TakeOver: Respect =

2015 WWE Network event

- Promotional poster of the pre-show and main show, featuring Sasha Banks and Bayley on the main, and various WWE ring announcers for the pre-show
- Promotion: WWE
- Brand: NXT
- Date: October 7, 2015
- City: Winter Park, Florida
- Venue: Full Sail University
- Attendance: 400+

WWE event chronology
← Previous; Live from Madison Square Garden	Next → Hell in a Cell

NXT TakeOver chronology
← Previous; Brooklyn	Next → London

NXT TakeOver: Respect was a 2015 professional wrestling livestreaming event produced by WWE, held exclusively for wrestlers from the promotion's developmental territory, NXT. It was the seventh NXT TakeOver event and took place on Wednesday, October 7, 2015, at NXT's home venue at the time, Full Sail University in Winter Park, Florida. The event aired exclusively on the WWE Network.

Six matches were contested at the event. In the main event, Bayley defeated Sasha Banks in a 30-minute Iron Man match to retain the NXT Women's Championship, in what was the first women's match to headline a major WWE event, the first time in WWE history that a women's match had this stipulation, and the longest women's match in WWE history at the time until Banks' match against Charlotte Flair at Roadblock: End of the Line in December 2016, which was also a 30-minute Iron Man match that went into sudden death overtime. The event also included the semi-finals and final of the Dusty Rhodes Tag Team Classic tournament. This was also the first TakeOver event in which the NXT Championship was not contested in the main event, and the only one until TakeOver: WarGames in November 2019 where the title was not defended whatsoever. It also marked the first WWE match of Asuka, who would go on to have the longest undefeated streak in WWE history.

== Production ==
=== Background ===
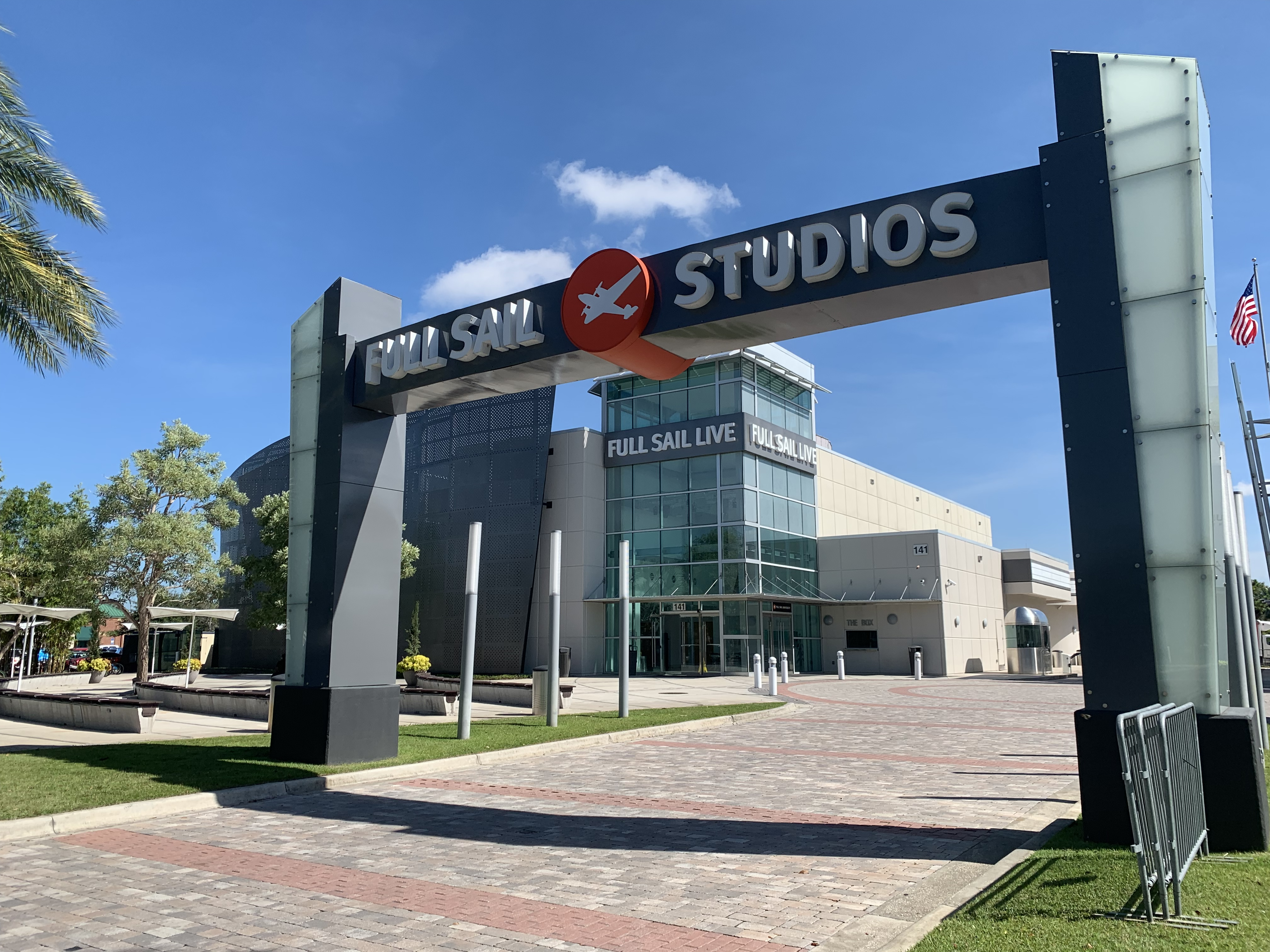
The seventh NXT TakeOver event was held at NXT's home venue at the time, Full Sail University in Winter Park, Florida.

TakeOver was a series of professional wrestling shows that began in May 2014, as WWE's developmental territory, NXT, held its second WWE Network-exclusive livestreaming event, billed as TakeOver. The "TakeOver" moniker subsequently became the branding for all of NXT's major events held periodically throughout the year. Respect was scheduled as the seventh TakeOver event and took place on Wednesday, October 7, 2015, at NXT's home venue at the time, Full Sail University in Winter Park, Florida.

=== Storylines ===
The card included matches that resulted from scripted storylines. Results were predetermined by WWE's writers on the NXT brand, while storylines were produced on their weekly television program, NXT.

At TakeOver: Brooklyn, Bayley defeated Sasha Banks to win her first NXT Women's Championship. On the September 16 episode of NXT, NXT General Manager William Regal scheduled Bayley to defend her title against Banks in a 30-minute Iron Man match, to which the NXT fans chanted "Iron Woman". In addition, for the first time in NXT history, the NXT Women were put in the main event of a TakeOver special.

At TakeOver: Brooklyn, Regal also revealed that NXT would hold a tag team tournament billed as the Dusty Rhodes Tag Team Classic in honor of WWE Hall of Famer Dusty Rhodes, a longtime NXT trainer and producer, with the finals scheduled for TakeOver: Respect. The Dusty Rhodes Tag Team Classic tournament started on the September 2 episode of NXT, with the first two matches out of the 16 team tournament with Baron Corbin and Rhyno, and American Alpha (Jason Jordan and Chad Gable) moving on. The next four matches took place at several NXT live events between August 28 to September 4, however, the matches were not revealed until September 9 on WWE's YouTube channel with Amore and Cassady, The Mechanics (Dash Wilder and Scott Dawson), The Hype Bros (Zack Ryder and Mojo Rawley), and The Vaudevillains (Aiden English and Simon Gotch) moving on. The final two first round matches took place on the September 9 episode of NXT, with NXT Champion Finn Bálor and Samoa Joe, and American Alpha (Chad Gable and Jason Jordan) winning their respective matches to advance in the tournament.

== Event ==
=== Preliminary matches ===
The event opened with the semi-finals in the Dusty Rhodes Tag Team Classic tournament. In the first semi-final, NXT Champion Finn Bálor and Samoa Joe faced The Mechanics (Dash Wilder and Scott Dawson). In the end, Joe executed a muscle buster on Wilder and Bálor executed a "Coup de Grâce" on Wilder to advance to the final.

Next, Baron Corbin and Rhyno and American Alpha (Jason Jordan and Chad Gable) competed in the second semi-final. The end came when Rhyno executed a "Gore" on Jordan. Corbin executed an "End of Days" on Gable to advance to the final.

After that, Asuka faced Dana Brooke (accompanied by Emma) in Asuka's debut. Asuka forced Dana to submit to the "Asuka Lock" to win the match.

In the fourth match, Apollo Crews faced Tyler Breeze. Crews executed a delayed spin-out powerbomb on Breeze to win the match.

In the penultimate match, Finn Bálor and Samoa Joe faced Baron Corbin and Rhyno in the final of the Dusty Rhodes Tag Team Classic tournament involving. During the match, Rhyno executed a "Gore" on Joe, but Bálor broke up the pinfall. In the end, Joe executed a muscle buster on Rhyno and Bálor executed a "Coup de Grâce" on Rhyno to win the tournament.

=== Main event ===
In the main event, Bayley defended the NXT Women's Championship against Sasha Banks in the first-ever Iron Woman match. At around eight minutes in, Banks tried to pin Bayley while using the ropes for leverage, but the referee caught her. Banks then blocked the referee's vision in the corner to poke Bayley in the eyes. Banks then rolled up Bayley to score the first point. Bayley evened the score at 1-1 after a "Bayley-to-Belly Suplex". Banks pushed Bayley into the electronic board on the entrance stage, causing her to be counted out, making the score 2-1. After Banks dominated Bayley, Bayley evened the score at 2-2 after pinning Banks with a rana. Afterwards, Bayley focused on injuring Banks' hand, but Banks sent her into the steel ring steps. Banks then performed a suicide dive on Bayley, who caught her and performed a "Bayley-to-Belly Suplex", but it resulted in a nearfall. A few minutes later, Bayley performed another "Bayley-to-Belly Suplex", this time from the middle rope, but Banks placed her foot on the rope to void the pin. In the closing moments, Bayley performed an inverted frankensteiner on Banks, who landed on her feet and followed up with her own "Bayley-to-Belly Suplex" on Bayley for a nearfall. Banks immediately applied the "Bank Statement". When Banks brought Bayley to the middle of the ring, Bayley attempted to apply the same submission on Banks, but Banks prevented it and reapplied the submission. Bayley escaped by grabbing Banks' injured hand and slamming it into the mat. Banks attempted the "Bank Statement" again, but Bayley countered and forced Banks to submit to a modified armbar. Seconds later, the match ended at a score of 3-2, resulting in Bayley winning the match and retaining the title.

== Reception ==
NXT TakeOver: Respect received critical acclaim. LaToya Ferguson of The A.V. Club praised the event, saying that the show shows examples of what the general audience does not get in traditional WWE pay-per-view events. There was also much praise to the main event for the NXT Women's Championship. The main event received the Meltzer rating of 4 and a quarter out of 5 stars. The match was named Match of the Year by Pro Wrestling Illustrated.

== Aftermath ==
After the event, Apollo Crews won a battle royal to face Finn Bálor for the NXT Championship by last eliminating Baron Corbin. On the November 4 episode of NXT, Crews won the match via disqualification when he was attacked by Corbin, thus Bálor retained.

Tyler Breeze moved to the main roster; he debuted on the October 22 episode of SmackDown, affiliating with Summer Rae and attacking Dolph Ziggler.

Meanwhile, Bayley began feuding with Alexa Bliss, while Emma and Dana Brooke continued their feud with Asuka, leading to a match at NXT TakeOver: London.

== Results ==
No.	Results	Stipulations	Times
1	Finn Bálor and Samoa Joe defeated The Mechanics (Dash Wilder and Scott Dawson) by pinfall	Dusty Rhodes Tag Team Classic tournament semi-final match	9:05
2	Baron Corbin and Rhyno defeated Chad Gable and Jason Jordan by pinfall	Dusty Rhodes Tag Team Classic tournament semi-final match	10:28
3	Asuka defeated Dana Brooke (with Emma) by submission	Singles match	5:07
4	Apollo Crews defeated Tyler Breeze by pinfall	Singles match	9:41
5	Finn Bálor and Samoa Joe defeated Baron Corbin and Rhyno by pinfall	Dusty Rhodes Tag Team Classic tournament final match	10:57
6	Bayley (c) defeated Sasha Banks 3–2	30-minute Iron Woman match for the NXT Women's Championship	30:00
(c) / – the champion(s) heading into the match

=== Iron Woman match ===
Score		Point winner	Decision	Notes	Time
Bayley	Banks	Point winner	Decision	Notes	Time
0	1	Sasha Banks	Pinfall	Banks pinned Bayley with a schoolgirl	8:35
1	1	Bayley	Pinfall	Bayley pinned Banks after the Bayley-to-Belly	10:52
1	2	Sasha Banks	Countout	Bayley was counted out after Banks shoved her into the electronic board	14:07
2	2	Bayley	Pinfall	Bayley pinned Banks with a rana	17:20
3	2	Bayley	Submission	Bayley submitted Banks to a scissored armbar	29:57

=== Dusty Rhodes Tag Team Classic ===
First round NXT; August 13–25, 2015 (Aired: September 2–9); NXT Live; August 28 – September 4, 2015
Enzo Amore and Big Cass	Pinfall
Angelo Dawkins and Sawyer Fulton
Finn Bálor and Samoa Joe	Pinfall
The Lucha Dragons (Kalisto and Sin Cara)	8:30
Blake and Murphy
The Vaudevillains (Aiden English and Simon Gotch)	Pinfall
Elias Samson and Tucker Knight
The Mechanics (Scott Dawson and Dash Wilder)	Pinfall
Hype Bros (Zack Ryder and Mojo Rawley)	Pinfall
Alexander Wolfe and Noah Kekoa
American Alpha (Jason Jordan and Chad Gable)	Pinfall
Neville and Solomon Crowe	9:35
Baron Corbin and Rhyno	Pinfall
The Ascension (Konnor and Viktor)	5:38
Tyler Breeze and Bull Dempsey	6:30
#DIY (Johnny Gargano and Tommaso Ciampa)	Pinfall

Quarterfinals; NXT; September 10, 2015 (Aired: September 16–30); NXT Live; September 18–26, 2015
Enzo Amore and Big Cass	3:43
Finn Bálor and Samoa Joe	Pinfall
The Vaudevillains
The Mechanics	Pinfall
Hype Bros
American Alpha	Pinfall
Baron Corbin and Rhyno	Pinfall
#DIY	8:04

Semifinals; NXT TakeOver: Respect; October 7, 2015
Finn Bálor and Samoa Joe	Pinfall
The Mechanics	8:57
American Alpha	10:29
Baron Corbin and Rhyno	Pinfall

Final; NXT TakeOver: Respect; October 7, 2015
Finn Bálor and Samoa Joe	Pinfall
Baron Corbin and Rhyno	10:57
