= Apollo Crews =

American professional wrestler (born 1987)

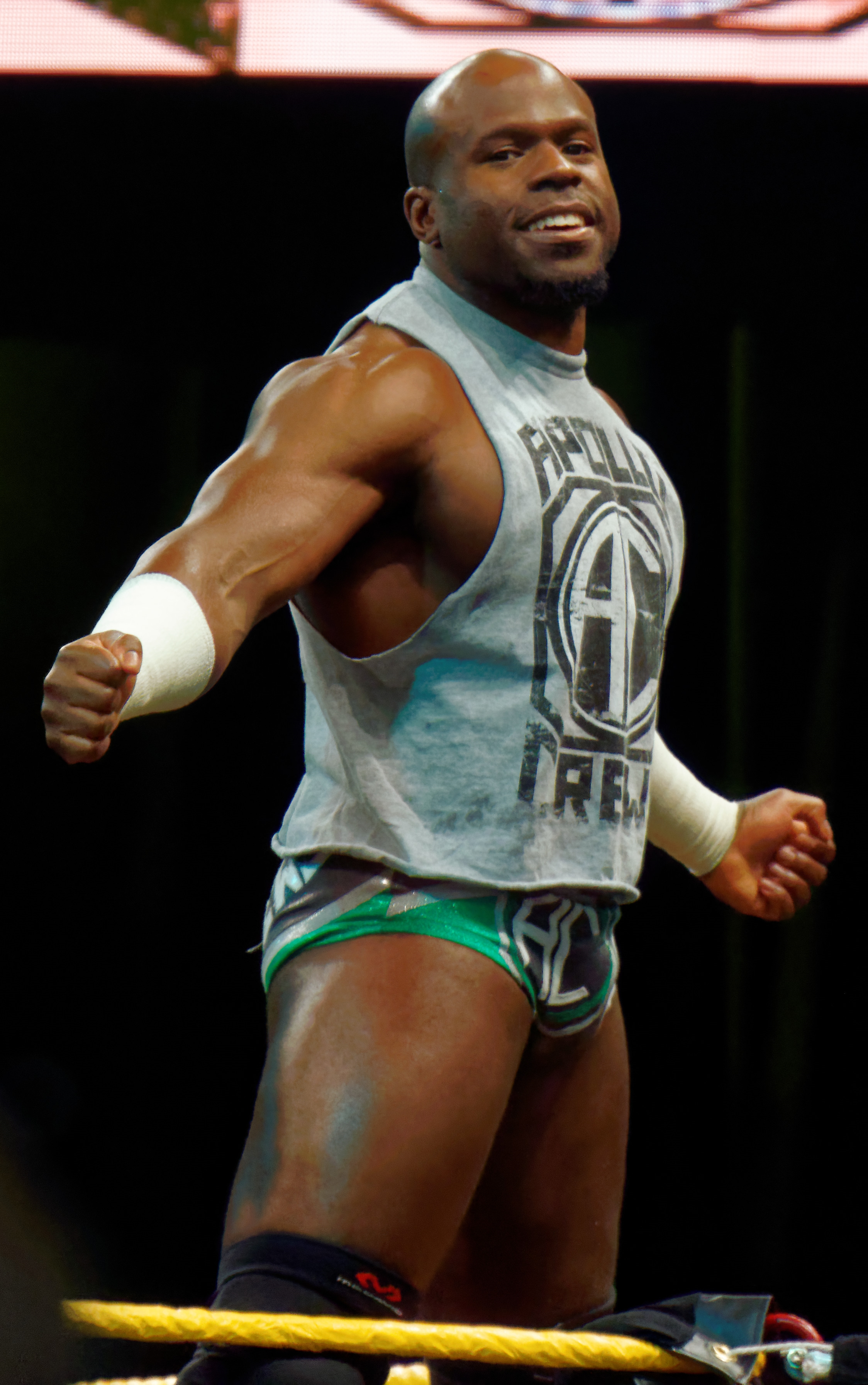
- Crews in April 2016

Personal information
- Born: Sesugh Isaac Uhaa; August 22, 1987 (age 39) Sacramento, California, U.S.
- Education: Keiser University
- Spouse: Linda Palonen
- Children: 2

Professional wrestling career
- Ring name(s): Apollo; Apollo Crews; Uhaa Nation
- Billed height: 6 ft 1 in (1.85 m)
- Billed weight: 240 lb (110 kg)
- Billed from: Benue State, Nigeria; Stone Mountain, Georgia
- Trained by: Mr. Hughes
- Debut: August 17, 2009

Sesugh Isaac Uhaa (born August 22, 1987) is an American professional wrestler. He is performing as a freelancer under the ring name Uhaa Nation. He is best known for his tenure in WWE under the ring name Apollo Crews.

Uhaa started his career in 2009, first working under the ring name Uhaa Nation, and made his breakthrough in 2011, when he was signed by the Dragon Gate USA promotion, which also led to him making his first trip to Japan to work for Dragon Gate.

He signed with WWE in 2015 and was assigned to the NXT brand, where he was given the ring name Apollo Crews. He was promoted to WWE's main roster in April 2016, where he won the United States Championship in May 2020 and later won the Intercontinental Championship at WrestleMania 37. He was released from WWE in 2026 and debuted for Total Nonstop Action Wrestling (TNA ) as well as returning to Dragongate that same year, reverting back to his Uhaa Nation name.

Standing at 6 ft 1 in (1.85 m) and weighing 240 lb (110 kg), Uhaa is known both as a high-flyer and a power wrestler.

== Early life ==
Sesugh Uhaa was born on August 22, 1987, in Sacramento, California, and was raised in the Atlanta, Georgia suburb of Stone Mountain. He became a fan of professional wrestling at an early age, particularly becoming a fan of performers such as "Stone Cold" Steve Austin, The Rock, and Kurt Angle. He went to a military high school and began practicing various sports, including amateur wrestling, soccer, football, and track and field, as both an outlet and a way to "get away from the military life". While weight training in high school, he was given the nickname "Uhaa Nation", when his coach noted that he was "as strong as a single nation". Uhaa attended Auburn University, leaving before finishing to pursue his wrestling career; he graduated in 2025 from Keiser University.

== Professional wrestling career ==
=== Early career (2009–2011) ===
After leaving college in 2008, Uhaa quickly got a job in order to pay for his professional wrestling training. He began training at the age of 21 under Mr. Hughes at his World Wrestling Alliance 4 (WWA4) promotion's training school in Atlanta. After making his wrestling debut under the ring name "Uhaa Nation" (a nickname given to him during high school) on August 17, 2009, he spent over a year working mainly for small promotions on the Georgian independent circuit, but also made trips to Houston, Texas-based Pro Wrestling Alliance (PWA) and Phenix City, Alabama-based Great Championship Wrestling (GCW), often working with fellow WWA4 trainee AR Fox.

=== Dragon Gate (2011–2015) ===
On September 9, 2011, Uhaa took part in a tryout seminar held by the Dragon Gate USA promotion. He was immediately signed for appearances for not only Dragon Gate USA, but also its parent promotion, Dragon Gate, and close affiliates Evolve and Full Impact Pro (FIP). He made his wrestling debut for Dragon Gate USA later that same day, defeating Aaron Draven in a squash match. Uhaa made his pay-per-view debut the following day at Untouchable 2011, where he answered Brodie Lee's open challenge and dominated him, before Lee left the ringside area. The following day at Way of the Ronin, Uhaa defeated Facade, Flip Kendrick and Sugar Dunkerton in a four-way match. On October 29, Uhaa made his first appearance for Full Impact Pro, when he defeated Jake Manning for FIP Florida Heritage Championship. Uhaa then entered a storyline, where different Dragon Gate USA stables tried to recruit him to join them. On November 30, Uhaa made his Japanese debut for Dragon Gate, during an event produced by the villainous Blood Warriors stable. Uhaa defeated Kotoka in a match that lasted 99 seconds, establishing himself as the newest member of Blood Warriors in the process. For the rest of the tour, which lasted through December 25, Uhaa worked alongside the Blood Warriors stable, winning every one of his matches. At the end of 2011, Dragon Gate USA named Uhaa the Best Newcomer of the year. He also finished second behind Daichi Hashimoto in Wrestling Observer Newsletter's award category for Rookie of the Year.

Upon his return to the United States, Uhaa made his debut for Evolve on January 14, 2012, with a win over Pinkie Sanchez. When Akira Tozawa took over the leadership of Blood Warriors from Cima and renamed the group Mad Blankey, Uhaa Nation followed along to the renamed stable. Uhaa made his first appearance representing Mad Blankey at a DGUSA event on March 29, when he and stablemates Akira Tozawa and BxB Hulk defeated Ronin (Chuck Taylor, Johnny Gargano and Rich Swann) and D.U.F. (Arik Cannon, Pinkie Sanchez, and Sami Callihan) in a three-way trios match. However, during the match, Uhaa suffered a knee injury, which sidelined him for a year. Uhaa returned to the ring on February 1, 2013, at Full Impact Pro's Everything Burns iPPV, where he successfully defended the FIP Florida Heritage Championship against Chasyn Rance. On March 2, Uhaa returned to Japan and Dragon Gate, when he and BxB Hulk defeated Don Fujii and Masaaki Mochizuki for the Open the Twin Gate Championship. They lost the title to Shingo Takagi and Yamato on May 5. On May 11, Uhaa was pinned for the first time in a Dragon Gate ring, when he was eliminated by Jimmy Susumu in the first round of the 2013 King of Gate tournament. On July 28 at Enter the Dragon 2013, Dragon Gate USA's fourth anniversary event, Uhaa suffered his first pinfall loss in the promotion, when he was defeated by Anthony Nese. On August 9, Uhaa lost the FIP Florida Heritage Championship to Gran Akuma. Back in Dragon Gate, Mad Blankey turned on Uhaa Nation on August 30, after he refused to wrestle Akira Tozawa, who had recently been kicked out of the group. Uhaa then formed a new partnership with Tozawa and Shingo Takagi. On September 12, the three were joined by Masato Yoshino, Ricochet, and Shachihoko Boy to form a new stable, which was on October 6 named Monster Express. On January 12, 2014, Uhaa received his first shot at Dragon Gate USA's top title, the Open the Freedom Gate Championship, but was defeated by the defending champion, Johnny Gargano. On March 6, Uhaa also received his first shot at Dragon Gate's top title, the Open the Dream Gate Championship, but was defeated by the defending champion, Monster Express stablemate Ricochet. On May 23, it was reported that Uhaa had signed a new contract with Dragon Gate USA.

On February 5, 2015, Uhaa made his return to Dragon Gate as Akira Tozawa's surprise partner in a tag team match, where they defeated Cyber Kong and Don Fujii. On March 1, Uhaa failed to win the Open the Dream Gate Championship from BxB Hulk in his final match for Dragon Gate. Uhaa worked his final Evolve events later that month during WWNLive's WrestleMania week.

=== WWE (2014–2026) ===
==== NXT and main roster beginnings (2014–2017) ====
In October 2014, Uhaa took part in a WWE tryout camp, resulting in a developmental contract offer. Starting on December 31, 2014, multiple sources reported that Uhaa had come to terms on a contract with WWE. Uhaa reported to the WWE Performance Center, the home of its NXT developmental brand, on April 6, 2015. WWE officially announced Uhaa as part of a new class of NXT recruits in an April 13 press release. Uhaa made his first televised appearance on the May 6 episode of NXT, signing an NXT contract in a segment with William Regal. Uhaa started working NXT house shows the following month, retaining the Uhaa Nation ring name.

On August 5, it was announced that Uhaa, under the new ring name "Apollo Crews", would make his televised NXT in-ring debut on August 22 at NXT TakeOver: Brooklyn, where he defeated Tye Dillinger, establishing himself as a face. Crews made his NXT debut on September 2, defeating Martin Stone. At NXT TakeOver: Respect on October 7, Crews defeated Tyler Breeze. On the October 14 episode of NXT, Crews won a battle royal to become the number one contender to the NXT Championship. Crews received his title shot against Finn Bálor on the November 4 episode of NXT, winning the match by disqualification after he was attacked by Baron Corbin, who held a grudge against Crews for eliminating him from the battle royal. On December 16, at NXT TakeOver: London, Crews lost to Corbin, marking his first pinfall loss in WWE. Crews then started a feud with Elias Samson, defeating him on the April 6 episode of NXT.

On April 4, 2016, Crews made his main roster debut on Raw, defeating Breeze. He remained undefeated over the following weeks, defeating the likes of Curtis Axel, Adam Rose, Heath Slater and Stardust. On the May 23 episode of Raw, Crews lost to Chris Jericho in a Money in the Bank qualifying match due to a pre-match attack by Sheamus. Crews defeated Sheamus on June 19 at Money in the Bank.

As part of the draft on July 19, Crews was drafted to the SmackDown brand. On the August 2 episode of SmackDown, Crews defeated Kalisto and Corbin in a triple threat match to become the number one contender to the Intercontinental Championship. At SummerSlam on August 21, he failed to win the title from The Miz. Crews lost to Corbin on September 11 during the Backlash pre-show. At TLC: Tables, Ladders & Chairs on December 4, Crews teamed with American Alpha (Chad Gable and Jason Jordan) and The Hype Bros (Mojo Rawley and Zack Ryder), defeating Curt Hawkins, The Vaudevillains (Aiden English and Simon Gotch) and The Ascension (Konnor and Viktor) in a 10-man tag team match.

At Royal Rumble on January 29, 2017, Crews entered his first Royal Rumble match at number 22, but was eliminated by Luke Harper. Crews then teamed up with Kalisto to feud with Dolph Ziggler, defeating him in a two-on-one handicap match on February 12 at Elimination Chamber. Following the match, Ziggler attacked the two, injuring Crews' ankle, which was trapped in a chair. On the February 28 episode of SmackDown, Crews lost to Ziggler in a chairs match.

==== Titus Worldwide (2017–2019) ====
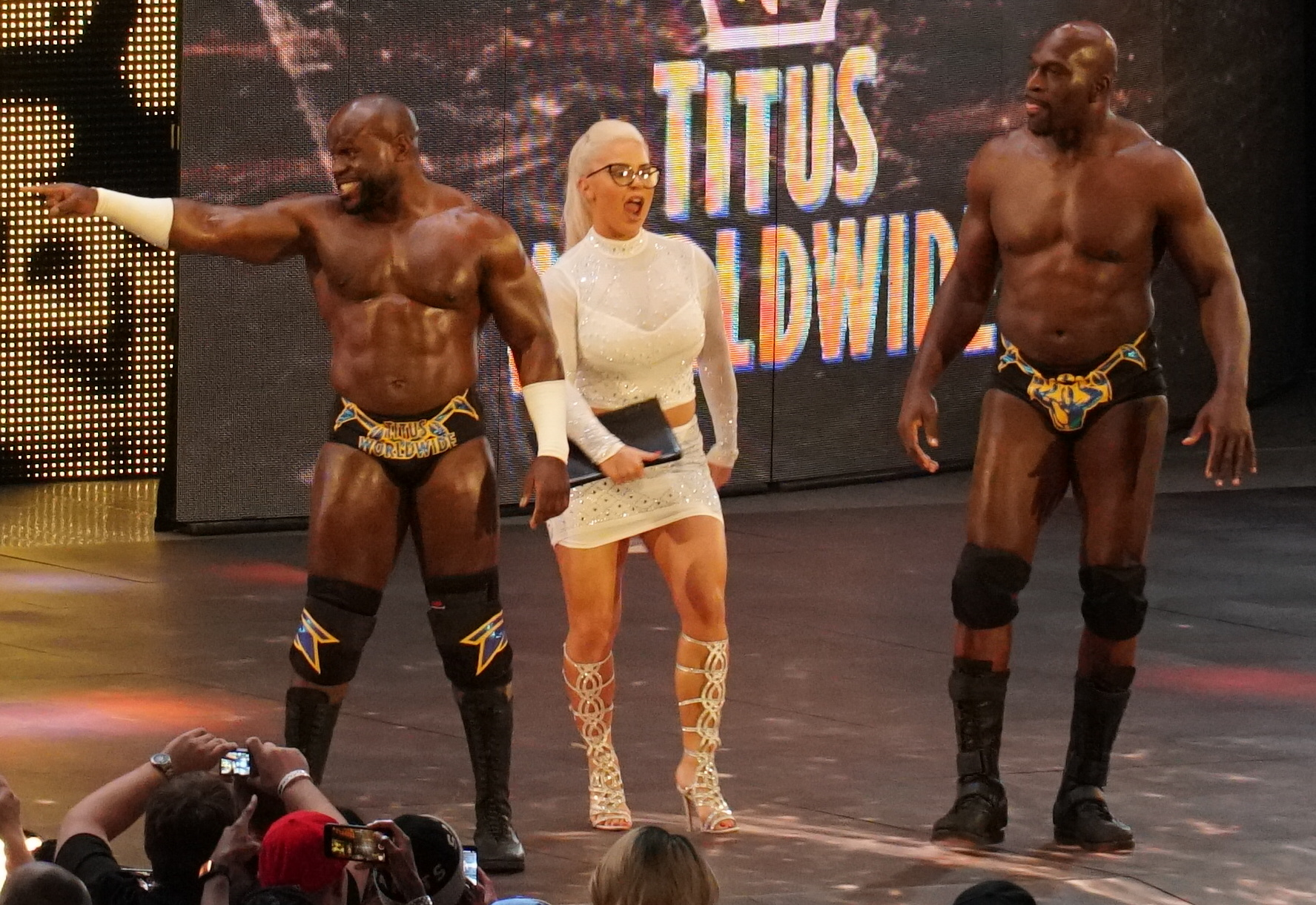
Crews (left) along with his fellow Titus Worldwide partners Dana Brooke and Titus O'Neil in April 2018

As part of the Superstar Shake-up, Crews was moved to the Raw brand. Shortly thereafter, a storyline began with Titus O'Neil offering Crews his managerial services. After becoming affiliated with the "Titus Brand", he started showing signs of a heel turn by displaying attitude and cockiness. On June 4, at Extreme Rules, Crews lost to Kalisto. During that period, Akira Tozawa joined the Titus Brand, which then became "Titus Worldwide" and turned O'Neil face. Crews lost to Elias on September 24 at No Mercy, and twice more on Raw. During this time, Dana Brooke joined Titus Worldwide as their manager, and Tozawa quietly left the faction.

On the January 8, 2018 and January 15 episodes of Raw, Crews and O'Neil defeated Raw Tag Team Champions Cesaro and Sheamus in upset victories. At Royal Rumble on January 28, Crews entered the Royal Rumble at number 13, but was eliminated by Cesaro. On February 19, his ring name was shortened to simply "Apollo". Apollo and O'Neil failed to win the titles at Elimination Chamber on February 25 and the next night on Raw. On the April 16 episode of Raw, his ring name was reverted to Apollo Crews. On the September 3 episode of Raw, Brooke parted ways with Titus Worldwide after mid-match coaching backfired, causing Brooke to lose her match.

On the October 15 episode of Raw, Crews returned as a singles competitor when he interrupted Elias during his performance, disbanding Titus Worldwide. The following week, he lost to Elias. On the December 31 episode of Raw, Crews won a battle royal by eliminating eight wrestlers to become the number one contender for the Intercontinental Championship against Dean Ambrose. That same night, he was defeated by Ambrose. On January 27, 2019, at Royal Rumble, Crews entered the Royal Rumble match at number 20, but was eliminated by Baron Corbin. As part of the Superstar Shake-up, Crews was drafted back to the SmackDown brand. At SummerSlam on August 11, Crews lost to Buddy Murphy by disqualification after interference from Erick Rowan. In August, Crews competed in the King of the Ring tournament, but lost to Andrade in the first round.

==== Championship reigns (2020–2022) ====
On the April 6, 2020 episode of Raw, Crews was traded to the Raw brand and lost to Aleister Black in his first match back. On the April 20 episode of Raw, Crews defeated MVP to qualify for the Money in the Bank ladder match, but injured his knee in a WWE United States Championship match against Andrade the following week, ruling him out of the ladder match.

Shortly after his return, on the May 25 episode of Raw, Crews defeated Andrade to win the United States Championship, his first title in WWE. At Backlash on June 14, Crews retained the title against Andrade. In June, he began a feud with The Hurt Business after Crews rejected an offer to join the stable. A title defense was set up between Crews and The Hurt Business' leader MVP on July 19 at The Horror Show at Extreme Rules, however, Crews was absent at the event, and MVP declared himself as the new champion. Crews' absence was explained as due to having suffered a bulging disc as a result from an attack by Bobby Lashley. In reality, however, he had tested positive for COVID-19. Crews returned on the August 3 episode of Raw and retained the title against MVP, as well as in a rematch on August 23 at SummerSlam. Seven days later at Payback on August 30, Crews lost the United States Championship to Lashley ending his reign at 97 days. On September 27, at Clash of Champions, Crews failed to regain the title from Lashley.

As part of the 2020 Draft in October, Crews was drafted back to the SmackDown brand. On the January 8, 2021 episode of SmackDown, Big E issued an open challenge for the WWE Intercontinental Championship, which Crews immediately accepted and lost. Over the following weeks, Crews would accept another one of Big E's open challenges, however, E rejected each of his challenges and told Crews to go to the "back of the line". On the February 19 episode of SmackDown, after losing to Shinsuke Nakamura, Crews attacked Big E, who was at ringside, turning heel for the first time in his WWE career. Crews would then debut a new character where he declared himself Nigerian royalty, spoke with a Nigerian accent in his promos in order to "embrace who he really is" and began coming to the ring with a spear. At Fastlane on March 21, Crews failed to win the Intercontinental Championship from Big E, but won the title in a Nigerian Drum Fight with help from Commander Azeez on Night 2 of WrestleMania 37 on April 11. On the August 13 episode of SmackDown, Crews lost the title to King Nakamura, ending his reign at 124 days. He failed to regain the title on the September 24 episode of SmackDown.

As part of the 2021 Draft, both Crews and Azeez were drafted to the Raw brand. He participated in a battle royal at Survivor Series on November 21 and challenged Damian Priest for the United States Championship on the November 29 episode of Raw, but failed to win both.

==== Return to NXT (2022–2023) ====
After spending most of the year relegated to Main Event, both Crews and Azeez were sent back to the NXT brand. On the June 7, 2022 episode of NXT, Crews returned as a face and dropped the Nigerian character, confronting NXT Champion Bron Breakker. He made his in-ring return to the brand on the same night, where he and Solo Sikoa defeated Carmelo Hayes and Grayson Waller. Crews feuded with Waller, losing to him on the August 30 episode of NXT after a poke to the eye. At Halloween Havoc on October 22, Crews defeated Waller in a casket match. On December 10, at Deadline, Crews challenged Breakker for the NXT Championship in a losing effort. He then engaged in a feud with Hayes, leading to a two out of three falls match on February 4, 2023 at Vengeance Day, which Crews lost in two straight falls. After the match, he was attacked by his former ally Dabba-Kato, originally Commander Azeez, who defeated Crews on the March 14 episode of NXT. On the April 18 episode of NXT, Crews wrestled his final match on the brand, losing to Dijak.

==== Return to main roster (2023–2026) ====
As part of the 2023 WWE Draft, Crews was drafted back to the Raw brand. He was drafted to the SmackDown brand at Night 2 of the 2024 WWE Draft in the supplemental draft. He would mostly compete on Main Event during this time. However, his notable victories on SmackDown during this time were against Giovanni Vinci, defeating him twice in under one minute. He would also form a tag team with Baron Corbin until Corbin's departure from the company on November 1, when his contract would not be renewed.

On the January 24, 2025 episode of SmackDown, Crews defeated Johnny Gargano after interference from the Motor City Machine Guns (Chris Sabin and Alex Shelley), having gotten into a confrontation the week prior. Shortly afterwards, on February 4, it was reported that Crews underwent surgery for a torn pectoral muscle and would be out of action. He made his return from injury at a Lucha Libre AAA Worldwide event on November 22 (since WWE and AAA had started a working partnership earlier in the year), defeating Lince Dorado in a dark match.

On April 17, 2026 episode of SmackDown, Crews competed in the Andre the Giant Memorial Battle Royal in what would be his final match and appearance with the WWE. The following week on April 24, Crews departed WWE as he had reportedly been released from his contract, ending his eleven-year tenure with the company.

=== Total Nonstop Action Wrestling (2026) ===
At Slammiversary on June 28, 2026, Uhaa made his debut in Total Nonstop Action Wrestling (TNA) under his old name "Uhaa Nation", competing in a triple threat match for the TNA International Championship against Mustafa Ali and Rich Swann; Nation failed to win as Ali retained the title. Uhaa later revealed that WWE was contacted by TNA during his 90-day non-compete window after his contract had expired, in order to allow him to compete at the event.

=== Return to Dragongate (2026–present) ===
On September 12, 2026 at Toyko Infinity Hectopascal, Uhaa made his return to Dragongate (formerly Dragon Gate) after eleven years, where he teamed with XenisS (Kota Minoura and Yuki Yoshioka) to defeat Gajadokuro (Jason Lee, KAI, and Madoka Kikuta).

== Other media ==
=== Video games ===
Video game appearances
Year	Title	Notes	Ref.
2016	WWE 2K17	Video game debut. Downloadable content	
2017	WWE 2K18		
2018	WWE 2K19		
2019	WWE 2K20		
2020	WWE 2K Battlegrounds		
2022	WWE 2K22		
2023	WWE 2K23		
2024	WWE 2K24		
2025	WWE 2K25		
2026	WWE 2K26		

== Personal life ==
Uhaa is of Nigerian descent, with both his parents originally hailing from Benue State, in the middle belt region of Nigeria. His father comes from the town of Vandeikya. His sister is in the United States Army and stationed in San Antonio, Texas.

Uhaa is married to Linda Palonen. They have two children.

== Championships and accomplishments ==
- Dragon Gate
  - Open the Twin Gate Championship (1 time) – with BxB Hulk
- Dragon Gate USA
  - Best Newcomer (2011)
- Full Impact Pro
  - FIP Florida Heritage Championship (1 time)
- Great Championship Wrestling
  - GCW Heavyweight Championship (1 time)
- Preston City Wrestling
  - PCW Heavyweight Championship (1 time)
- Pro Wrestling Illustrated
  - Ranked No. 65 of the top 500 singles wrestlers in the PWI 500 in 2021
- World Wrestling Alliance 4
  - WW4A Tag Team Championship (1 time) – with Magic
  - WW4A Internet Championship (1 time)
- WWE
  - WWE Intercontinental Championship (1 time)
  - WWE United States Championship (1 time)
