= Royal Rumble (2018) =

WWE pay-per-view and livestreaming event

- Promotional poster featuring Braun Strowman, Brock Lesnar, Kane, and various WWE wrestlers
- Promotion: WWE
- Brand(s): Raw; SmackDown
- Date: January 28, 2018
- City: Philadelphia, Pennsylvania
- Venue: Wells Fargo Center
- Attendance: 17,629

WWE event chronology
← Previous; NXT TakeOver: Philadelphia	Next → Elimination Chamber

Royal Rumble chronology
← Previous; 2017	Next → 2019

The 2018 Royal Rumble was a professional wrestling pay-per-view (PPV) and livestreaming event produced by WWE, held for wrestlers from the promotion's main roster brands, Raw and SmackDown. It was the 31st annual Royal Rumble event and took place on January 28, 2018, at the Wells Fargo Center in Philadelphia, Pennsylvania. This was the third Royal Rumble held at the venue, after the 2004 event, when it was known as the Wachovia Center, and the 2015 event.

The event was based around the Royal Rumble match, a modified 30-person battle royal in which the participants enter at timed intervals instead of all beginning in the ring at the same time and the winner received a world championship match at WrestleMania. For the first time, the event featured a women's Royal Rumble match. As a result and also for the first time, there were two Royal Rumble matches on the card, one for men and one for women, which is now standard, with the winners of each receiving a choice of which championship to challenge for at WrestleMania 34. The men could choose to challenge for either Raw's Universal Championship or SmackDown's WWE Championship, while the women had the choice between the Raw Women's Championship and the SmackDown Women's Championship.

Nine matches were contested at the event, including three on the Kickoff pre-show. The main event was the 2018 Women's Royal Rumble match, which was won by Raw's Asuka, who last eliminated SmackDown's Nikki Bella. This was also the second women's match to main event a WWE PPV and livestreaming event, but the first to main event one of the "Big Four". The 2018 Men's Royal Rumble match was won by SmackDown's Shinsuke Nakamura, who last eliminated Raw's Roman Reigns. Other prominent matches included Brock Lesnar retaining the Universal Championship in a triple threat match against Braun Strowman and Kane, and AJ Styles retained the WWE Championship against Kevin Owens and Sami Zayn in a handicap match. The event was also notable for the surprise debut of former Ultimate Fighting Championship mixed martial artist Ronda Rousey following the women's Rumble match, officially confirming that she had signed full-time with WWE.

== Production ==
=== Background ===
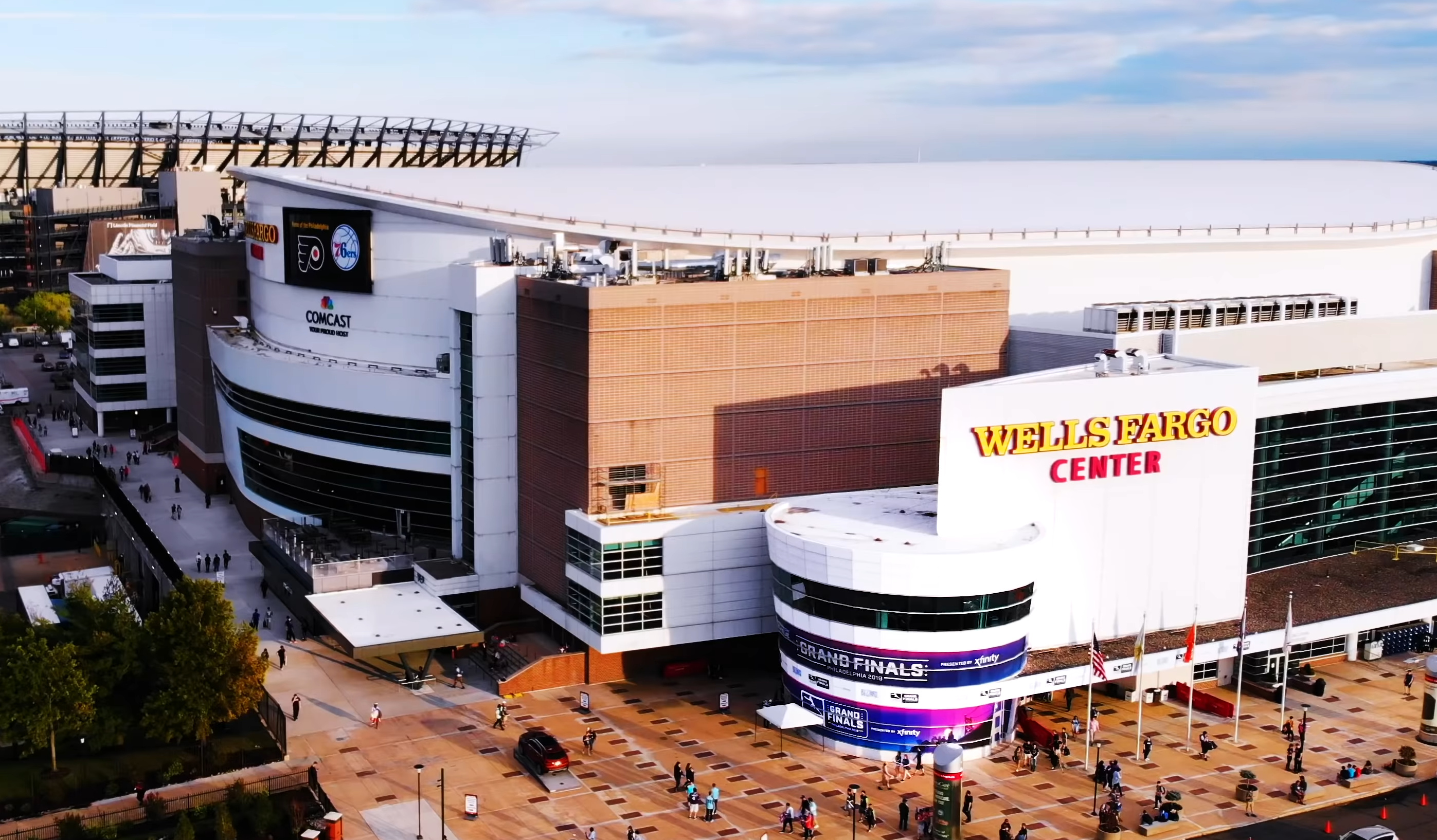
The 31st annual Royal Rumble was the third time for the event to be held at the Wells Fargo Center in Philadelphia, Pennsylvania, after 2004 (when it was known as the Wachovia Center) and 2015.

The Royal Rumble is an annual professional wrestling event, produced every January by WWE since 1988; that first event was a television special before it became a pay-per-view (PPV) event beginning in 1989 and then also available via livestreaming on the WWE Network since 2015. It is one of the promotion's original four PPVs, along with WrestleMania, SummerSlam, and Survivor Series, referred to as the "Big Four". It is named after and centered on the Royal Rumble match. Announced on January 26, 2017, the 31st Royal Rumble event was scheduled to be held on January 28, 2018, at the Wells Fargo Center in Philadelphia, Pennsylvania, marking the third Royal Rumble held at this venue, after the 2004 event (when it was known as the Wachovia Center) and the 2015 event. It featured wrestlers from the Raw and SmackDown brand divisions with some NXT wrestlers and WWE veterans appearing in the Royal Rumble matches. Tickets went on sale on July 29, 2017.

The Royal Rumble match is a modified battle royal in which the participants enter at timed intervals instead of all beginning in the ring at the same time, and the match generally features 30 wrestlers. Since 1993, the winner traditionally earns a world championship match at that year's WrestleMania. It was originally only contested by male wrestlers. However, for 2018, Raw Commissioner Stephanie McMahon scheduled the first-ever women's Royal Rumble match to be held at the 2018 Royal Rumble, which consequently made the 2018 event the first to include two Rumble matches, which is now standard. As a result, the winners of each match received a choice of which championship to challenge for at WrestleMania 34. The men could choose to challenge for either Raw's Universal Championship or SmackDown's WWE Championship, while the women had the choice between the Raw Women's Championship and the SmackDown Women's Championship.

=== Storylines ===
The event comprised nine matches, including three on the Kickoff pre-show, that resulted from scripted storylines. Results were predetermined by WWE's writers on the Raw and SmackDown brands, while storylines were produced on WWE's weekly television shows, Monday Night Raw, SmackDown Live, and the cruiserweight-exclusive 205 Live.

On the October 16, 2017, episode of Raw, Kane returned from a ten-month hiatus and helped Braun Strowman to defeat Roman Reigns in a Steel Cage match. Kane was then added to Strowman's team at TLC: Tables, Ladders & Chairs in the 5-on-3 handicap Tables, Ladders, and Chairs match. During the match, Kane accidentally hit Strowman with a chair, which caused tension between the two. Later on in the match, Kane turned on Strowman and crushed him in the back of a garbage truck; their team ultimately lost. The two then feuded over the next several weeks, leading to a match on the December 11 episode to determine the number one contender against Brock Lesnar for the Universal Championship at the Royal Rumble, but the match ended in a double countout. Raw General Manager Kurt Angle then decided that Lesnar would defend the title against both Kane and Strowman in a triple threat match at the event. On the January 8 episode, Kane attacked Lesnar from behind, leading to backstage where they continued brawling before being attacked by Strowman. After laying Kane and Lesnar out, Strowman uses a grappling hook to knock over a lighting rig that crushed both men. Lesnar was taken to a medical facility while Kane refused medical attention. Due to his actions, Strowman was removed from the triple threat match and fired by Angle. Strowman went on a rampage backstage, including destroying Angle's office and flipping over a tractor. Before he could do any more damage, Raw Commissioner Stephanie McMahon rehired Strowman, putting him back into the Universal Championship match at the Royal Rumble.

After Survivor Series, several women from NXT were promoted to the main rosters of both Raw and SmackDown. On the November 20, 2017, episode of Raw, Paige, who had been out with an injury since June 2016, returned along with the debuts of NXT's Mandy Rose and Sonya Deville, forming the heel group Absolution, while similarly on the November 21 episode of SmackDown, NXT's Ruby Riott, Liv Morgan, and Sarah Logan debuted and formed the heel group The Riott Squad. On the December 18, 2017, episode of Raw, with a larger roster of women on the main rosters, Raw Commissioner Stephanie McMahon scheduled the first-ever women's Royal Rumble match for the 2018 Royal Rumble, with the winner receiving a match at WrestleMania 34 for the top championship of their choice: Raw's Women's Championship or SmackDown's Women's Championship. Both brands' respective commissioners and general managers agreed that the women's match would have all of the same rules as the men's match, including having 30 participants. Stephanie was announced to join the commentary team for the women's match, and television host Maria Menounos was announced to be the special guest ring announcer.

At Clash of Champions, SmackDown's Commissioner Shane McMahon and General Manager Daniel Bryan both refereed a tag team match pitting Kevin Owens and Sami Zayn against Randy Orton and Shinsuke Nakamura, where Owens and Zayn would have been fired from WWE had they lost. During the match, there was controversy between Shane and Bryan, which resulted in Bryan giving a fast count for Owens and Zayn to win. Tensions between Shane and Bryan continued over the next couple of weeks, culminating on the final SmackDown of 2017, when Bryan scheduled Owens to face WWE Champion AJ Styles in a non-title match in the main event, much to the disapproval of Shane, who felt that Owens should not be in the main event, or facing the WWE Champion. That match ended when Zayn interfered, allowing Owens to win. The next week, Zayn would also defeat Styles in a non-title match after interference from Owens. Enraged at back-to-back losses, Styles stated they might as well schedule him in a handicap match against Owens and Zayn, which Bryan took literally and scheduled for the Royal Rumble where Styles would also defend the WWE Championship against both men. On the January 9 episode of SmackDown, Styles said that although it was unfair, he was confident that he would win; Owens and Zayn interrupted and claimed that they would become the first-ever co-WWE Champions. On the final SmackDown before the Royal Rumble, Styles faced Owens and Zayn in back-to-back matches where Shane threatened that if one were to interfere in the other's match, that person would be fired. Styles managed to defeat Owens in the first match by submission, however, he would lose to Zayn in the second match.

On the December 18, 2017, episode of Raw, Seth Rollins' tag team partner Dean Ambrose was injured by Samoa Joe. The following week, despite both wanting to take on Joe to avenge Ambrose, Raw General Manager Kurt Angle instead had his (storyline) son, Jason Jordan, and Rollins team up to face Cesaro and Sheamus for the Raw Tag Team Championship; Jordan and Rollins defeated Cesaro and Sheamus to win the championship. After the former champions confronted Angle about their contractual rematch, Angle scheduled it for the Royal Rumble. On the January 15 episode, Jordan caused a distraction, allowing Titus Worldwide (Apollo Crews and Titus O'Neil) to again defeat Cesaro and Sheamus in a rematch from the previous week, which Rollins disapproved of as he did not like Jordan acting on his own. Cesaro and Sheamus would try and return the favor during Rollins' match against Finn Bálor, but it backfired, resulting in Rollins winning, and Cesaro and Sheamus brawling with Bálor Club members, Luke Gallows and Karl Anderson, at ringside. On Raw 25 the next week, Jordan and Rollins were the guests on Christian's The Peep Show, which Cesaro and Sheamus interrupted and the two teams brawled where Rollins accidentally hit Jordan with a knee attack that was intended for Cesaro.

At Clash of Champions, The Usos (Jey Uso and Jimmy Uso) retained the SmackDown Tag Team Championship in a fatal four-way match against Rusev and Aiden English, The New Day's Big E and Xavier Woods, and Chad Gable and Shelton Benjamin. On the following episode of SmackDown, Gable and Benjamin defeated The Usos in a non-title match, and they were awarded with a championship match on the first SmackDown of 2018, where they defeated The Usos to initially win the titles after pinning Jimmy Uso; however, Jimmy was not the legal man, and thus the match was restarted and The Usos retained their championship. The following week, Gable and Benjamin confronted SmackDown General Manager Daniel Bryan over the incident. After questioning if they should have to defeat The Usos twice in the same night, Bryan decided that at the Royal Rumble, The Usos would defend the SmackDown Tag Team Championship against Gable and Benjamin in a two out of three falls match.

On January 26, three matches were announced for the Royal Rumble Kickoff pre-show. For SmackDown, it was announced that United States Champion Bobby Roode would have an open challenge for the title. Two tag team matches were scheduled for Raw: a rematch between Luke Gallows and Karl Anderson and The Revival (Dash Wilder and Scott Dawson) from Raw 25, and a six-man tag team match for the cruiserweight division with Kalisto, Gran Metalik, and Lince Dorado against Drew Gulak, TJP, and Gentleman Jack Gallagher.

=== Cancellations ===
Two other matches had been promoted for the event, but were later removed.

The first was the tournament final for SmackDown's then-vacant United States Championship. Originally scheduled for the PPV, the finals were instead contested on the January 16 episode of SmackDown, where Bobby Roode defeated Jinder Mahal to win the title.

The second was a championship match for the Raw brand where WWE Cruiserweight Champion Enzo Amore was scheduled to defend the title against Cedric Alexander. However, after Amore was suspended from WWE on January 22 due to allegations of sexual harassment and sexual assault, the match was canceled. Amore was fired the next day and the title was vacated.

== Event ==
Other on-screen personnel
Role:	Name:
English commentators	Michael Cole (Raw/both Royal Rumble matches)
English commentators	Corey Graves (all matches)
English commentators	Booker T (Raw)
English commentators	Tom Phillips (SmackDown)
English commentators	Byron Saxton (SmackDown/Men's Royal Rumble match/Six-man tag team match)
English commentators	Vic Joseph (Six-man tag team match)
English commentators	Jerry Lawler (Men's Royal Rumble match)
English commentators	Stephanie McMahon (Women's Royal Rumble match)
Spanish commentators	Carlos Cabrera
Spanish commentators	Marcelo Rodríguez
German commentators	Carsten Schaefer
German commentators	Tim Haber
German commentators	Calvin Knie
Ring announcers	Greg Hamilton (SmackDown/Men's Royal Rumble match)
Ring announcers	JoJo (Raw)
Ring announcers	Maria Menounos (Women's Royal Rumble match)
Referees	Jason Ayers
Referees	Shawn Bennett
Referees	Mike Chioda
Referees	John Cone
Referees	Dan Engler
Referees	Chad Patton
Referees	Charles Robinson
Referees	Rod Zapata
Interviewer	Renee Young
Pre-show panel	Renee Young
Pre-show panel	Peter Rosenberg
Pre-show panel	David Otunga
Pre-show panel	Jerry Lawler
Pre-show panel	John "Bradshaw" Layfield
Pre-show panel	Alundra Blayze
Pre-show panel	Ric Flair

=== Pre-show ===
Three matches were contested during the Royal Rumble Kickoff pre-show. In the first match - featuring the cruiserweight division - Kalisto, Gran Metalik, and Lince Dorado faced TJP, Gentleman Jack Gallagher, and Drew Gulak in a six-man tag team match. Kalisto performed a "Salida Del Sol" on TJP to score the win.

Next, also from Raw, The Revival (Dash Wilder and Scott Dawson) faced Luke Gallows and Karl Anderson. Dawson performed a chop block on Anderson to score the win.

Finally, SmackDown's United States Champion Bobby Roode issued an open challenge, which was answered by fellow SmackDown wrestler Mojo Rawley. Roode performed a "Glorious DDT" on Rawley to score the pinfall and retain the title.

=== Preliminary matches ===
The actual pay-per-view opened with AJ Styles defending the WWE Championship against Kevin Owens and Sami Zayn in a handicap match. In the end, Styles threw Zayn out of the ring and immediately Owens performed a superkick on Styles. Owens - who was not the legal man - attempted a pop up powerbomb on Styles, who countered into a roll up to retain the title. In a backstage segment, Owens and Zayn confronted SmackDown Commissioner Shane McMahon about the incident; however, after questioning if he saw what had happened, Shane smiled, replied "Yep", and walked off.

Next, The Usos (Jey Uso and Jimmy Uso) defended the SmackDown Tag Team Championship against Chad Gable and Shelton Benjamin in a two out of three falls match. Jimmy and Jey performed a double superkick on Gable, who was kneeling, to score the first fall. Jey then pinned Benjamin with a small package to score the second fall to retain the titles.

After that, the 30-man Royal Rumble match for a world championship match at WrestleMania 34 was contested. Rusev and Finn Bálor began the match as the first and second entrants, respectively. Baron Corbin (#4) eliminated Rhyno (#3), but was eliminated by Bálor. Corbin attacked Bálor, Rusev, and Heath Slater (#5), who just made his entrance. NXT Champion Andrade "Cien" Almas was a surprise entrant at #7. Tye Dillinger was scheduled to be #10, but was attacked backstage by Kevin Owens and Sami Zayn, resulting in Zayn taking Dillinger's spot. Afterwards, Sheamus (#11) tossed Slater back in the ring, where Slater eliminated Sheamus in two seconds, but was eliminated by Bray Wyatt (#8) afterwards. Shinsuke Nakamura entered at #14 and eliminated Zayn. Jinder Mahal (#18) eliminated New Day members Big E (#9) and Xavier Woods (#12), but as he tried to eliminate Kofi Kingston, Kingston landed on Woods, and placed his foot on a plate of pancakes provided by Big E. When Mahal prevented Kingston from re-entering the ring, Big E and Woods sent Kingston back in the ring, after which, Kingston performed Trouble in Paradise on Mahal before eliminating him. Afterwards, Almas performed a Hammerlock DDT on Kingston before eliminating him. Afterwards, Matt Hardy (#19) teamed with Wyatt, and after they fought each other, they simultaneously eliminated each other. John Cena entered at #20 and eliminated Elias (#6) and The Hurricane (a surprise entrant at #21). NXT's Adam Cole, another surprise entrant, entered at #23. Randy Orton (#24) performed an "RKO" on Almas and eliminated him after a near 30-minute run. Rey Mysterio, another surprise entrant, entered at #27 and eliminated Cole. Roman Reigns entered at #28 and eliminated Titus O'Neil (#25). Reigns and Seth Rollins (#18) teamed up and performed a powerbomb on The Miz (#26) over the top rope to eliminate him, after which, Reigns immediately eliminated Rollins. Dolph Ziggler, making his return after vacating the United States Championship, entered at #30 and eliminated Goldust (#29), but was eliminated by Bálor. Reigns performed a superman punch on Orton and eliminated Orton. Mysterio performed a "619" on Cena and Reigns, but was eliminated by Bálor. Bálor, Nakamura, Cena, and Reigns were the final four. Cena eliminated Bálor (who lasted nearly an hour) and immediately afterwards fought with Nakamura, who performed a "Kinshasa" on Cena to eliminate him. Nakamura attacked Reigns and attempted a "Kinshasa", however, Reigns countered into a spear. As Reigns attempted to eliminate Nakamura, Nakamura countered, performed a "Kinshasa" on Reigns and then eliminated Reigns to win the match. Afterward, Renee Young interviewed Nakamura and asked which world championship he wanted to challenge for at WrestleMania 34. He called out WWE Champion AJ Styles, thus choosing the WWE Championship and staying on SmackDown.

Next, Seth Rollins and Jason Jordan defended the Raw Tag Team Championship against Cesaro and Sheamus. During the match, Jordan sustained a head injury (after being thrown into the ring post by Cesaro), rendering him unable to compete. In the end, Sheamus and Cesaro performed a "White Noise"/diving neckbreaker combination on Rollins to win the titles for a record-setting fourth time as a team, and a record-setting fifth time for Cesaro individually.

In the fifth match, Brock Lesnar (accompanied by Paul Heyman) defended the Universal Championship against Braun Strowman and Kane in a triple threat match. Lesnar drove Kane into a corner, but Strowman caught Lesnar and drove him into the opposite corner. Strowman attacked Lesnar with a running dropkick and performed a clothesline on Kane. As Lesnar attempted an "F-5" on Strowman, Kane performed a chokeslam on Lesnar. Before he could cover him, Strowman attacked Kane, drove him back into his corner, and performed 2 headbutts on him. As Kane attempted a chokeslam on Strowman, Lesnar struck Kane with a chair, only for Strowman to punch the chair out of Lesnar's hand, perform a clothesline on him, and throw him and Kane outside the ring. At ringside, Strowman drove Lesnar into the barricade and struck Kane with the steel steps. Strowman retrieved two tables under the ring and brought Kane back in the ring. Strowman positioned both tables at two opposite corners, with one standing up and the other next to the turnbuckles. As Kane attempted a chokeslam on Strowman, the latter countered into his own chokeslam on Kane. However, Lesnar broke up the pinfall at a two count and performed three German suplexes on Strowman. Strowman performed a running powerslam on Lesnar through the standing table, only for Kane to break up the pinfall at a two count. As Strowman attempted another powerslam on Kane through the other table, the latter then drove Strowman through it instead, and performed a chokeslam on him, with Lesnar breaking up the pinfall at a two count. Lesnar performed an "F-5" on Kane, but before he could cover him, Strowman performed a German suplex on Lesnar, who rolled outside the ring. Once again at ringside, Strowman drove Lesnar into the barricade. Lesnar then performed an "F-5" on Strowman through an announce table and overturned another announce table on top of Strowman (in a reversal of what happened last year at Summerslam, though where Lesnar had to be stretchered out and then returned, Strowman stood back up in defiance). As Kane attempted a chokeslam on Lesnar, the latter countered and then performed another "F-5" on Kane through the third announce table. Strowman recovered and performed a kick to Lesnar, who fell head-first into the steel steps. Back in the ring, Strowman performed two running powerslams on Lesnar, but Kane returned and struck Strowman with a chair, driving him outside the ring. As Kane attempted a Tombstone piledriver on Lesnar, the latter shoved Kane into Strowman (who was about to return to the ring), knocking him off the ring apron. Lesnar performed an "F-5" on Kane onto the chair and pinned him to retain the title. After the match, an enraged Strowman returned to the ring and yelled at Lesnar that he did not beat and pin him.

=== Main event ===
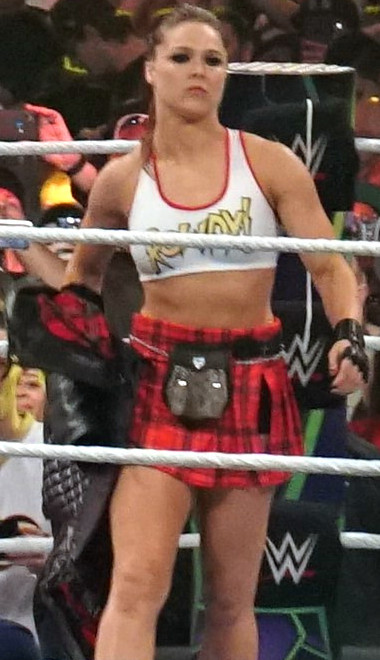
Ronda Rousey was rumored to be a surprise entrant in the women's Royal Rumble match, and although she denied that she would be at the event, she appeared after the match's conclusion, confirming she had signed full-time with WWE.

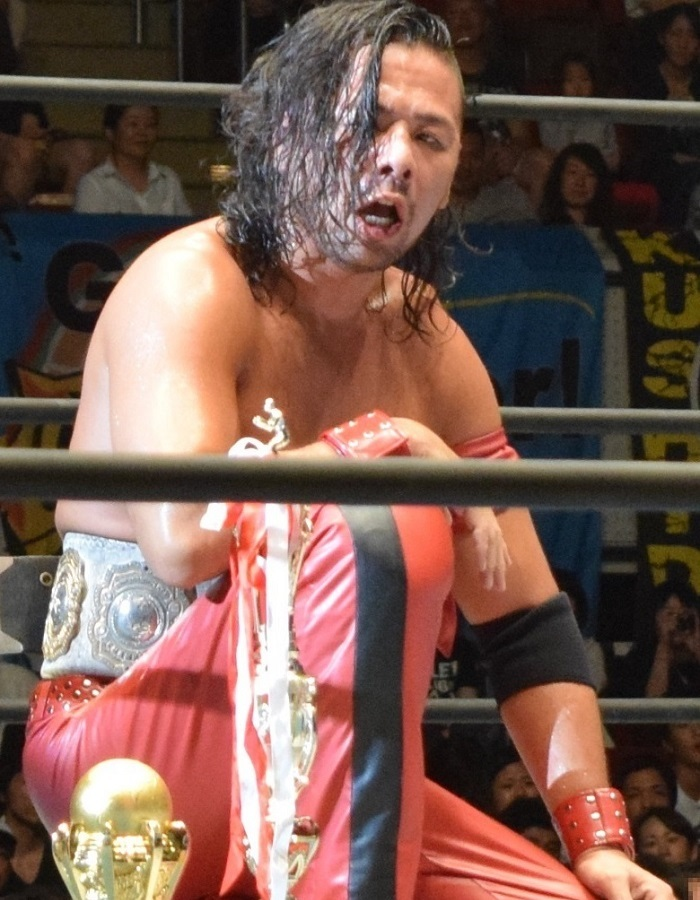
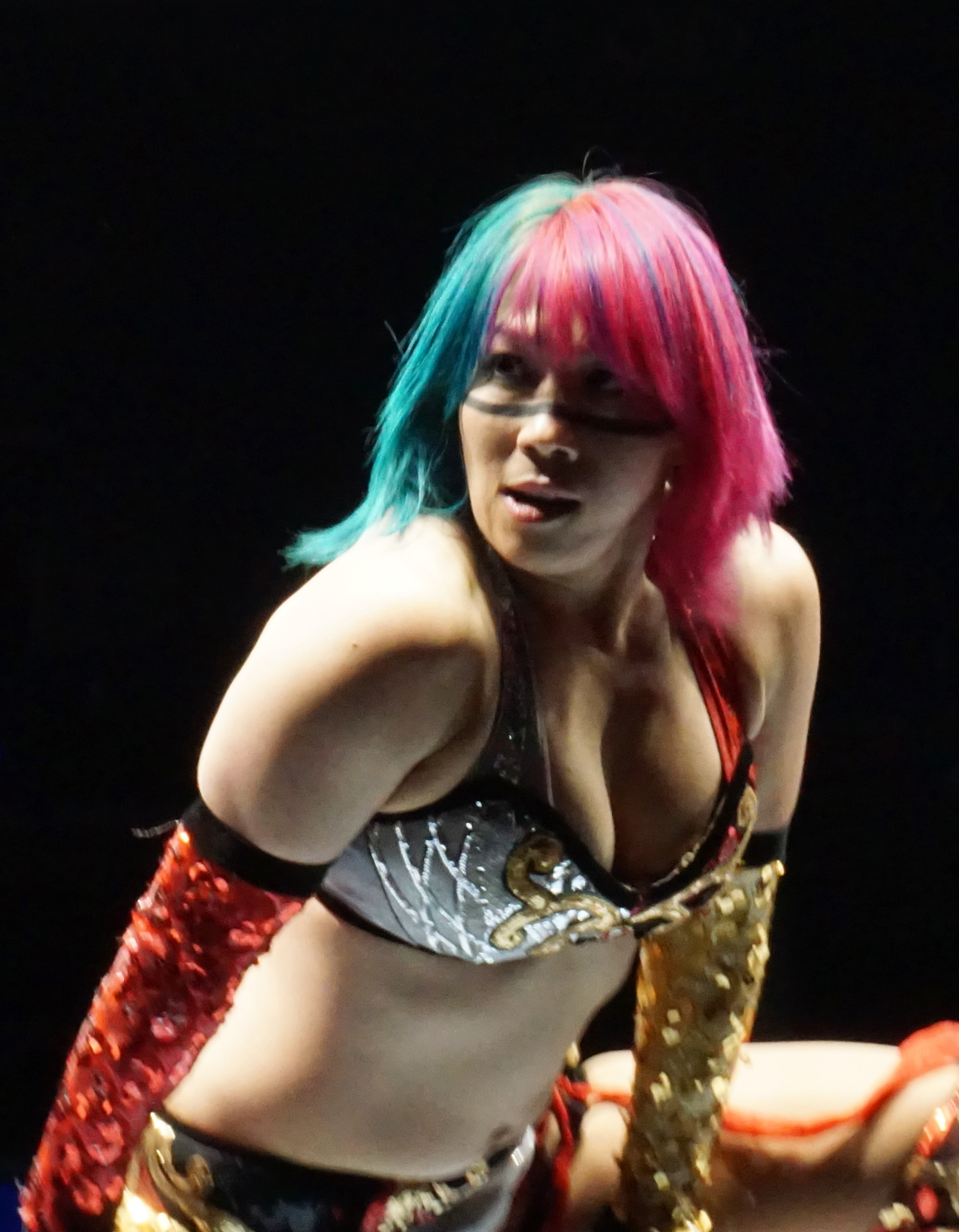
SmackDown's Shinsuke Nakamura and Raw's Asuka were the respective winners of the men's and women's 2018 Royal Rumble matches. Nakamura immediately chose to challenge AJ Styles for SmackDown's WWE Championship at WrestleMania 34, while Asuka delayed her choice before ultimately deciding to challenge Charlotte Flair for the SmackDown Women's Championship.

The main event was the first-ever 30-woman Royal Rumble match for a women's championship match at WrestleMania 34. Sasha Banks and Becky Lynch were the first and second entrants, respectively. Sarah Logan entered at #3, followed by Mandy Rose at #4 and WWE Hall of Famer Lita at #5. After Lita eliminated Rose, Kairi Sane entered at #6. Sane managed to take down Lynch and Banks before Tamina entered at #7. Lita performed a Moonsault on Lynch and Banks, and eliminated Tamina, but was eliminated by Lynch. Dana Brooke (#8) eliminated Sane before being eliminated by Torrie Wilson (#9), who was in turn eliminated by Sonya Deville (#10). Liv Morgan (#11) teamed up with Logan to take down Banks before Molly Holly (#12) eliminated Logan. Morgan and Deville double-teamed Lana (#13). Michelle McCool (#14) ended up eliminating Deville, Morgan, Holly, and Lana. After Ruby Riott entered at #15, Vickie Guerrero entered at #16, after which, all the women eliminated her from the match. Guerrero then struck Carmella (#17) with the Money in the Bank briefcase before leaving. Natalya (#18) tried to eliminate Kelly Kelly (#19), who performed a headscissors on McCool, who was then eliminated by Natalya. After Naomi entered at #20, Riott eliminated Lynch. Jacqueline (#21) and Natalya were unable to eliminate Kelly, after which, Nia Jax (#22) eliminated Jacqueline and Kelly. Jax then eliminated Riott, and sent Naomi out of the ring and into the other women, but Naomi was not eliminated. After NXT Women's Champion Ember Moon entered at #23, Naomi saved herself from elimination by using a commentator chair to make it back to the ring. However, moments later, Naomi was eliminated by Jax. Beth Phoenix entered at #24 and tried to power up Jax, but was unable to. Phoenix and Natalya knocked Jax out of the ring, after which, Natalya turned on Phoenix and eliminated her. Asuka entered at #25 and battled with Moon. Moon was able to perform the Eclipse on Asuka, however, Asuka was able to eliminate Moon. Mickie James entered at #26 followed by Nikki Bella at #27. After Carmella mocked John Cena's "You Can't See Me" gesture at Nikki, Nikki eliminated Carmella. Nikki's tag team partner, Brie Bella, entered at #28 followed by Bayley at #29. The final entrant, Trish Stratus, performed a double bulldog on The Bella Twins. After taking out Bayley, Stratus and James had a showdown, with Stratus eliminating James. Afterwards, all the other women eliminated Jax from the match before Banks turned on Bayley and eliminated her. Stratus then eliminated Natalya, but after mocking Banks, Banks eliminated her from the match. The final four were Banks, Asuka, Nikki, and Brie. Banks, Nikki, and Brie attacked Asuka, but as Banks went for her double knee press on Asuka, Nikki and Brie eliminated Banks (who lasted the longest at nearly 55 minutes). Asuka attacked Nikki and Brie, but Nikki performed a Rack Attack 2.0 on Asuka and then eliminated Brie. Nikki sent Asuka over the top rope, but Asuka held on. Asuka then headscissored Nikki over the top rope and onto the apron. A short time later, Asuka kicked Nikki's legs out to win the match and earn a women's championship match at WrestleMania 34. After the match, Raw Women's Champion Alexa Bliss and SmackDown Women's Champion Charlotte Flair entered the ring. Before Asuka could make her decision for which title she wanted to challenge for, they were interrupted by the surprise appearance of former UFC star Ronda Rousey, officially confirming she had signed full-time with WWE. Rousey pointed to the WrestleMania sign and offered a handshake to Asuka, who refused. Rousey then shook hands with Raw Commissioner Stephanie McMahon as the event ended. The jacket which Rousey wore during this appearance belonged to lifelong idol Roddy Piper, whose son let her borrow it.

== Aftermath ==
=== Raw ===
On Raw the following night, Raw Commissioner Stephanie McMahon convinced Asuka to wait until after Elimination Chamber to make her decision, as Raw Women's Champion Alexa Bliss was scheduled to defend her title in the first-ever women's Elimination Chamber match, and the result may affect Asuka's decision. Asuka was then confronted by Sasha Banks, who spent the longest time in the Royal Rumble match, and Banks challenged Asuka to a match that Asuka won. Banks, along with Bayley, Mandy Rose, Mickie James, and Sonya Deville were announced as the other competitors in the Elimination Chamber match. Nia Jax was also scheduled to face Asuka at Elimination Chamber where if she were to win, she would be added to the Asuka's championship match at WrestleMania. On the February 12 episode of Raw, it was announced that Ronda Rousey would sign her Raw contract at Elimination Chamber. At SmackDown's Fastlane pay-per-view, Asuka appeared and decided to challenge Charlotte Flair for the SmackDown Women's Championship at WrestleMania.

Since Shinsuke Nakamura decided to stay on SmackDown to challenge for the WWE Championship at WrestleMania 34, Raw General Manager Kurt Angle scheduled a number one contender's Elimination Chamber match at the namesake event to determine who would face Brock Lesnar for the Universal Championship at WrestleMania. Six qualification matches were scheduled over the next couple of weeks. Braun Strowman and Kane battled in a Last Man Standing match, which Strowman won to qualify. After the match, Kane was taken to a local hospital. Elias, John Cena, Roman Reigns, Intercontinental Champion The Miz, Finn Bálor, and Seth Rollins also qualified, marking the first seven-man Elimination Chamber match.

New Raw Tag Team Champions Cesaro and Sheamus defended their titles against Titus Worldwide (Apollo Crews and Titus O'Neil), as they had beaten Cesaro and Sheamus two weeks in a row prior to the Royal Rumble; Cesaro and Sheamus retained. The following week, Jason Jordan and Seth Rollins were scheduled to have their contractual rematch, but after Jordan was deemed unable to compete, he was replaced by Roman Reigns. Jordan, however, accidentally caused them to be disqualified.

=== SmackDown ===
On the following episode of SmackDown, Shinsuke Nakamura celebrated his win at the Royal Rumble, and said he would become the new WWE Champion at WrestleMania 34. He was interrupted by Kevin Owens and Sami Zayn, who said that they should be the co-WWE Champions, but the referee failed at his job at the Royal Rumble. WWE Champion AJ Styles came out and said that Owens and Zayn could complain all they want, but there would be a dream match at WrestleMania between him and Nakamura. Styles then suggested to have a dream team that night with him and Nakamura facing Owens and Zayn, which SmackDown General Manager Daniel Bryan made official for later that night in which Styles and Nakamura won. During the match, there were tensions between Owens and Zayn as Bryan had also scheduled them to face each other the following week to determine the number one contender for the WWE Championship at Fastlane. The championship match at Fastlane then became a fatal five-way match also involving Baron Corbin and Dolph Ziggler, and finally a six-pack challenge when John Cena qualified by defeating Styles in a non-title match.

In the mid-card, a fatal four-way match between Kofi Kingston of The New Day, Jinder Mahal, Zack Ryder, and Rusev occurred to determine the number one contender against Bobby Roode for the United States Championship, which was won by Rusev, who was unsuccessful in winning the title. Also following the Royal Rumble, SmackDown General Manager Daniel Bryan revealed the first-ever "SmackDown Top Ten List" as voted on by the SmackDown roster to see who the wrestlers thought should get a title opportunity. This played into a storyline between Roode, who ranked fifth, Randy Orton, who ranked ninth, and Jinder Mahal, who did not rank, resulting in SmackDown Commissioner Shane McMahon scheduling Roode to defend the U.S. Championship against Orton at Fastlane.

In the women's division, SmackDown Women's Champion Charlotte Flair praised the first-ever women's Royal Rumble match, but wished that she could have competed in it. She addressed Ronda Rousey's debut and questioned who her WrestleMania 34 opponent would be. The Riott Squad interrupted and Ruby Riott said Flair would not make it to WrestleMania and they attacked Flair. Carmella came out to try and cash-in her Money in the Bank briefcase on Flair, but was not able to as she accidentally knocked out the referee before the bell could ring. After feuding with The Riott Squad over the next few weeks, Flair was scheduled to defend her title against Riott at Fastlane.

=== 205 Live ===
On 205 Live, Drake Maverick (formerly known as Rockstar Spud in Impact Wrestling) was appointed as the 205 Live General Manager. Maverick announced that there would be a 16-man single elimination tournament to crown a new WWE Cruiserweight Champion, with the finals to occur at WrestleMania 34.

== Results ==
No.	Results	Stipulations	Times
1^{P}	Kalisto, Gran Metalik, and Lince Dorado defeated TJP, Gentleman Jack Gallagher, and Drew Gulak by pinfall	Six-man tag team match	13:20
2^{P}	The Revival (Dash Wilder and Scott Dawson) defeated Luke Gallows and Karl Anderson by pinfall	Tag team match	9:15
3^{P}	Bobby Roode (c) defeated Mojo Rawley by pinfall	Singles match for the WWE United States Championship	7:45
4	AJ Styles (c) defeated Kevin Owens and Sami Zayn by pinfall	Handicap match for the WWE Championship	15:55
5	The Usos (Jey Uso and Jimmy Uso) (c) defeated Chad Gable and Shelton Benjamin by 2–0	Two out of three falls match for the WWE SmackDown Tag Team Championship	13:55
6	Shinsuke Nakamura won by last eliminating Roman Reigns	30-man Royal Rumble match for a world championship match at WrestleMania 34	1:05:27 (Note: WWE lists the men's Royal Rumble match as lasting 1:05:27, but Pro Wrestling Dot Net lists the match as lasting 1:05:35.)
7	Cesaro and Sheamus defeated Seth Rollins and Jason Jordan (c) by pinfall	Tag team match for the WWE Raw Tag Team Championship	12:50
8	Brock Lesnar (c) (with Paul Heyman) defeated Kane and Braun Strowman by pinfall	Triple threat match for the WWE Universal Championship	10:55
9	Asuka won by last eliminating Nikki Bella	30-woman Royal Rumble match for a world championship match at WrestleMania 34	58:57 (Note: WWE lists the women's Royal Rumble match as lasting 58:57, although Pro Wrestling Dot Net lists the match as lasting 59:10.)
(c) / – the champion(s) heading into the match; P / – the match was broadcast on the pre-show

=== Men's Royal Rumble match entrances and eliminations ===
Brand

– Raw
– SmackDown
– NXT
– Unbranded
– Winner

Draw	Entrant	Brand/Status	Order	Eliminated by	Time	Eliminations
1	Rusev	SmackDown	12	Bray Wyatt and Matt Hardy	30:28	0
2	Finn Bálor	Raw	27	John Cena	57:38	4
3	Rhyno	Raw	1	Baron Corbin	02:06	0
4	Baron Corbin	SmackDown	2	Finn Bálor	01:06	1
5	Heath Slater	Raw	4	Bray Wyatt	00:33**	1
6	Elias	Raw	15	John Cena	26:00	0
7	Andrade "Cien" Almas	NXT	18	Randy Orton	29:24	1
8	Bray Wyatt	Raw	14	Matt Hardy	20:38	3
9	Big E	SmackDown	8	Jinder Mahal	14:14	0
10	Sami Zayn*	SmackDown	5	Shinsuke Nakamura	06:57	0
11	Sheamus	Raw	3	Heath Slater	00:02***	0
12	Xavier Woods	SmackDown	7	Jinder Mahal	08:24	0
13	Apollo Crews	Raw	6	Cesaro	05:16	0
14	Shinsuke Nakamura	SmackDown	—	Winner	44:38	3
15	Cesaro	Raw	9	Seth Rollins	05:08	1
16	Kofi Kingston	SmackDown	11	Andrade "Cien" Almas	05:41	1
17	Jinder Mahal	SmackDown	10	Kofi Kingston	03:48	2
18	Seth Rollins	Raw	22	Roman Reigns	19:01	2
19	Matt Hardy	Raw	13	Bray Wyatt****	01:17	2
20	John Cena	Unbranded	28	Shinsuke Nakamura	29:14	3
21	The Hurricane	Unbranded	16	John Cena	00:45	0
22	Aiden English	SmackDown	17	Finn Bálor	02:16	0
23	Adam Cole	NXT	19	Rey Mysterio	06:52	0
24	Randy Orton	SmackDown	25	Roman Reigns	13:55	1
25	Titus O'Neil	Raw	20	Roman Reigns	06:07	0
26	The Miz	Raw	21	Roman Reigns and Seth Rollins	05:20	0
27	Rey Mysterio	Unbranded	26	Finn Bálor	09:40	1
28	Roman Reigns	Raw	29	Shinsuke Nakamura	21:52	4
29	Goldust	Raw	23	Dolph Ziggler	02:43	0
30	Dolph Ziggler	SmackDown	24	Finn Bálor	02:01	1

(*) - Tye Dillinger was announced as the #10 entrant, but he was attacked backstage by Kevin Owens and Sami Zayn, resulting in Zayn taking his spot.
(**) - Heath Slater spent significant time outside of the ring before officially entering the Rumble, due to being attacked on the ramp by Baron Corbin, Elias, Andrade, Bray Wyatt, Big E, Sami Zayn, and Sheamus.
(***) - WWE.com's official website lists Sheamus' time to be 20 seconds, but they have otherwise stated 2 seconds.
(****) - There has been a popular confusion where Matt Hardy eliminated himself at the same time he eliminated Bray Wyatt but Wyatt eliminated Hardy.

=== Women's Royal Rumble match entrances and eliminations ===
Brand

– Raw
– SmackDown
– NXT
– Hall of Famer (HOF)
– Unbranded
– Winner

Draw	Entrant	Brand/ Status	Order	Eliminated by	Time	Eliminations
1	Sasha Banks	Raw	27	Brie Bella & Nikki Bella	54:46	3
2	Becky Lynch	SmackDown	14	Ruby Riott	30:54	2
3	Sarah Logan	SmackDown	7	Molly Holly	16:30	0
4	Mandy Rose	Raw	1	Lita	03:52	0
5	Lita	HOF	3	Becky Lynch	05:51	2
6	Kairi Sane*	NXT	4	Dana Brooke	04:49	0
7	Tamina	SmackDown	2	Lita	01:34	0
8	Dana Brooke	Raw	5	Torrie Wilson	02:59	1
9	Torrie Wilson	Unbranded	6	Sonya Deville	03:04	1
10	Sonya Deville	Raw	8	Michelle McCool	06:41	1
11	Liv Morgan	SmackDown	9	Michelle McCool	05:12	0
12	Molly Holly	Unbranded	10	Michelle McCool	04:04	1
13	Lana	SmackDown	11	Michelle McCool	02:54	0
14	Michelle McCool	Unbranded	13	Natalya	08:38	5
15	Ruby Riott	SmackDown	17	Nia Jax	11:32	2
16	Vickie Guerrero	Unbranded	12	Becky Lynch, Michelle McCool, Ruby Riott, & Sasha Banks	00:57	0
17	Carmella	SmackDown	21	Nikki Bella	18:45	0
18	Natalya	SmackDown	25	Trish Stratus	25:34	3
19	Kelly Kelly	Unbranded	16	Nia Jax	05:02	0
20	Naomi	SmackDown	18	Nia Jax	06:49	0
21	Jacqueline	HOF	15	Nia Jax	01:52	0
22	Nia Jax	Raw	23	Asuka, Bayley, Brie Bella, Natalya, Nikki Bella, & Trish Stratus	17:56	4
23	Ember Moon	NXT	20	Asuka	06:14	0
24	Beth Phoenix	HOF	19	Natalya	02:22	0
25	Asuka	Raw	—	Winner	19:41	3
26	Mickie James	Raw	22	Trish Stratus	08:24	0
27	Nikki Bella	Unbranded	29	Asuka	16:30	4
28	Brie Bella	Unbranded	28	Nikki Bella	11:58	2
29	Bayley	Raw	24	Sasha Banks	05:04	1
30	Trish Stratus	HOF	26	Sasha Banks	05:36	3

(*) - Kairi Sane was a last minute replacement for Alicia Fox, who was originally scheduled to participate in the match, but got injured just prior to the event.
