= NXT TakeOver: London =

2015 WWE Network event

- Promotional poster featuring Finn Bálor, Samoa Joe, Apollo Crews, Baron Corbin, Bayley, and Nia Jax
- Promotion: WWE
- Brand: NXT
- Date: December 16, 2015
- City: London, England
- Venue: The SSE Arena
- Attendance: 10,079
- Tagline: NXT is Taking Over London for the First Time Ever!

WWE event chronology
| ← Previous; TLC: Tables, Ladders & Chairs | Next → Royal Rumble |

NXT TakeOver chronology
| ← Previous; Respect | Next → Dallas |

WWE in Europe chronology
| ← Previous; Insurrextion | Next → United Kingdom Championship Tournament |

NXT TakeOver: London was a 2015 professional wrestling livestreaming event produced by the American promotion WWE, held exclusively for wrestlers from the promotion's developmental territory, NXT. It was the eighth NXT TakeOver event and took place on Wednesday, December 16, 2015, at The SSE Arena in London, England. The event aired exclusively on the WWE Network at 8:00 p.m. Greenwich Mean Time (3:00 p.m. Eastern Time) and was the finale of NXT's first tour of the United Kingdom. This was also the first TakeOver event held outside of the United States and the only to be held outside of North America.

Eight matches were contested at the event, including three taped for the December 23 episode of NXT. In the main event, Finn Bálor defeated Samoa Joe to retain the NXT Championship.

== Production ==
=== Background ===
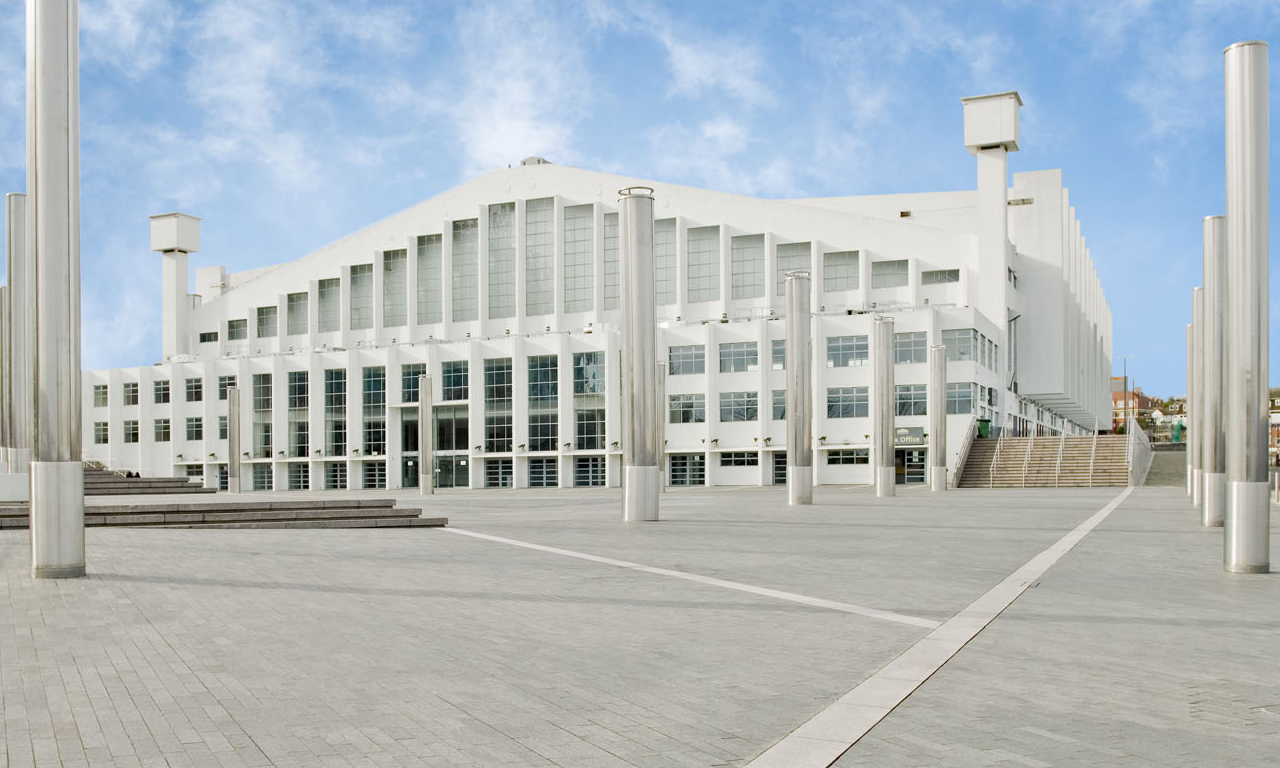
The eighth NXT TakeOver event was held at The SSE Arena in London, England.

TakeOver was a series of professional wrestling events that began in May 2014, as the American promotion WWE's developmental territory, NXT, held its second WWE Network-exclusive livestreaming event, billed as TakeOver. The "TakeOver" moniker subsequently became the branding for all of NXT's major events held periodically throughout the year. Announced on August 27, 2015, TakeOver: London was scheduled as the eighth TakeOver event and the first to be held outside of the United States and North America. It was scheduled for Saturday, December 16, 2015, at The SSE Arena and was named after the venue's city of London, England. It aired live at 8:00 p.m. Greenwich Mean Time (3:00 p.m. Eastern Time) and was the finale of NXT's first tour of the United Kingdom. Tickets went on sale on August 28.

=== Storylines ===
The card included matches that resulted from scripted storylines. Results were predetermined by WWE's writers on the NXT brand, while storylines were produced on WWE's weekly television program, NXT.

After TakeOver: Respect, a battle royal took place to determine the new #1 contender to Finn Bálor's NXT Championship, which was won by Apollo Crews. Bálor and Crews faced each other for the title on 4 November episode of NXT, with the match ending in disqualification after Baron Corbin interfered and attacked both men with his primary target being Crews. Samoa Joe came to the ring and fended off Corbin before attacking his friend Bálor, turning heel in the process. Feeling betrayed for not getting his title shot despite Bálor wanting to give him a shot, Joe took extreme lengths to get his title match. It was subsequently announced that Bálor would defend the NXT Championship against Samoa Joe at TakeOver: London. Meanwhile, Baron Corbin revealed that he had cost Apollo Crews his title opportunity due to a personal grudge, stemming from eliminating Crews last in the battle royal. Corbin then challenged Crews to a match at TakeOver: London, which Crews later accepted.

After retaining the NXT Women's Championship against Sasha Banks in the first-ever 30-minute Iron Woman match at TakeOver: Respect, Bayley continued to make successful title defences. During Bayley's title defence against Eva Marie on 25 November episode of NXT, newcomer Nia Jax interfered on Marie's behalf by knocking out the official referee and having Charles Robinson officiate while being towards Marie. Despite this interference, Robinson was soon knocked out and Bayley retained her title by pinning Marie with another referee making the three count. After the match, Jax assaulted Bayley with the intention of going after the NXT Women's Championship. After a few confrontations, it was announced that Bayley would defend the NXT Women's Championship against Jax at TakeOver: London.

== Event ==
=== Preliminary matches ===
The broadcast opened with a match between Asuka and Emma (accompanied by Dana Brooke). Asuka had the advantage until a distraction by Brooke allowed Emma to take control. During a comeback by Asuka, Emma countered the first "Asuka Lock" attempt by knocking them into the referee, thus disabling him. Brooke handed Emma a belt to use, which was snatched by Asuka. While Asuka protested against a possible disqualification to the referee, Emma capitalised with a roll-up for a near-fall and Asuka immediately applied the "Asuka Lock", only for Brooke to distract the referee. Emma eventually submitted, however, the referee did not notice this. Emma attempted to use the belt again, but Asuka executed a spin kick to win the match.

Next, Dash and Dawson defended the NXT Tag Team Championship against Enzo Amore and Colin Cassady (accompanied by Carmella). Amore and Cassady had a lively start, exemplified by Cassady throwing Amore over the top rope onto Dash and Dawson at ringside. However, the champions regained control by targeting Amore's arm and Cassady's leg, necessitating Amore saving Cassady from receiving a diving knee-breaker. Amore and Cassady combined for a "Rocket Launcher" onto Dash, with Dawson breaking up the pin and then sending Cassady into the ring-post. Dash and Dawson then caught Amore on the top rope, pinning Amore after a "Shatter Machine" to retain.

Next was the match pitting Apollo Crews against Baron Corbin. Corbin gained the advantage by dropping Crews over the top rope onto the ring steps. Later, Corbin executed "Deep Six" for a near-fall. Crews countered Corbin's "End of Days", then executed an enzuigiri and a standing moonsault for a near-fall. Despite lifting Corbin in preparation for a powerbomb, Corbin grabbed the ropes and escaped, then pinned Crews after the "End of Days" to win the match.

In the penultimate match, Bayley defending the NXT Women's Championship against Nia Jax. Jax dominated much of the match, countering all of Bayley's attempts of a guillotine choke into repeated leg drops or Samoan drops, but only for near-falls. After much of this, Bayley forced Jax to tap out to a fourth guillotine choke hold to retain the title.

=== Main event ===
In the main event, Finn Bálor defended the NXT Championship against Samoa Joe. During the match, both men performed dives out of the ring on their opponent, with Joe using an elbow suicida and Bálor a running flip over the top rope. Bálor managed to escape Joe's attempts at executing a muscle buster, and also rolled out of Joe's "Coquina Clutch". In the end, Bálor chopped Joe to the mat when both battled on the top rope, and then pinned Joe after a "Coup de Grâce" to retain the title. The event is also notable for the Jack the Ripper inspired entrance that Finn Bálor performed before his match against Samoa Joe. Bálor stated in an interview with Rebellious Noise that the night in London was special for him, and he could not have expected how well the production team would shoot the entrance stating "it was mind blowing".

== Reception ==
The show generally received positive feedback from both the critics and the fans. Dave Meltzer's Wrestling Observer Newsletter rated the Women's Championship match 3.25 out of 5 stars and the NXT Championship match 4 out of 5 stars, which is the same rating as the Emma vs. Asuka match. The lowest rating was the Apollo Crews vs. Baron Corbin match, which got 2.5 out of 5 stars. History of Wrestling scored the show 89/100.

== Aftermath ==
After defeating Apollo Crews at the event, Baron Corbin declared his intentions of going after Finn Bálor's NXT Championship, proclaiming himself as the No. 1 contender. However Sami Zayn also returned from injury at the event also wanting to have a match for the title. This led to a Triple Threat Match between Zayn, Corbin and Samoa Joe that took place on 27 January 2016 episode of NXT to determine the No. 1 contender to face Bálor for the NXT Championship. The match ended without a winner after Corbin tapped out to both Zayn's Sharpshooter and Joe's crossface at the same time, leaving a shocked William Regal to review the match. Zayn and Joe faced each other in a No. 1 contenders match on 17 February episode of NXT, which once again ended in no contest after both men's shoulders were pinned.

A women's battle royal took place on 13 January 2016 episode of NXT to determine the next No. 1 contender to Bayley's NXT Women's Championship. The match was won by Carmella after last eliminating Eva Marie. Bayley successfully retained her title against Carmella on 10 February episode, but afterwards, Carmella was attacked by Eva Marie and Nia Jax, leading to Bayley coming to Carmella's aid before gaining assistance by Asuka, who fended off Marie and Jax. Asuka then confronted Bayley and looked at the NXT Women's title belt, signalling a challenge for the title.

Despite his title opportunity gone, Apollo Crews challenged Finn Bálor to a non-title match as he did not want their bout to end in a disqualification which Bálor later accepted. Bálor defeated Crews on 3 February 2016 episode of NXT with both men shaking hands in respect afterwards.

== Results ==
| No. | Results | Stipulations | Times |
|---|---|---|---|
| 1^{N} | American Alpha (Chad Gable and Jason Jordan) defeated Blake and Murphy (with Alexa Bliss), The Hype Bros (Mojo Rawley and Zack Ryder), and The Vaudevillains (Aiden English and Simon Gotch) | Fatal four-way tag team match | — |
| 2^{N} | Elias Samson defeated Bull Dempsey by pinfall | Singles match | 7:10 |
| 3^{N} | Sami Zayn defeated Tye Dillinger by pinfall | Singles match | — |
| 4 | Asuka defeated Emma (with Dana Brooke) by pinfall | Singles match | 14:49 |
| 5 | Dash Wilder and Scott Dawson (c) defeated Colin Cassady and Enzo Amore (with Carmella) by pinfall | Tag team match for the NXT Tag Team Championship | 14:57 |
| 6 | Baron Corbin defeated Apollo Crews by pinfall | Singles match | 11:40 |
| 7 | Bayley (c) defeated Nia Jax by submission | Singles match for the NXT Women's Championship | 13:17 |
| 8 | Finn Bálor (c) defeated Samoa Joe by pinfall | Singles match for the NXT Championship | 18:22 |
(c) / – the champion(s) heading into the match; N / – the match was taped for a future broadcast of NXT

== See also ==
- 2015 in professional wrestling
- Professional wrestling in the United Kingdom
