= Kalisto (wrestler) =

Mexican-American wrestler (born 1986)

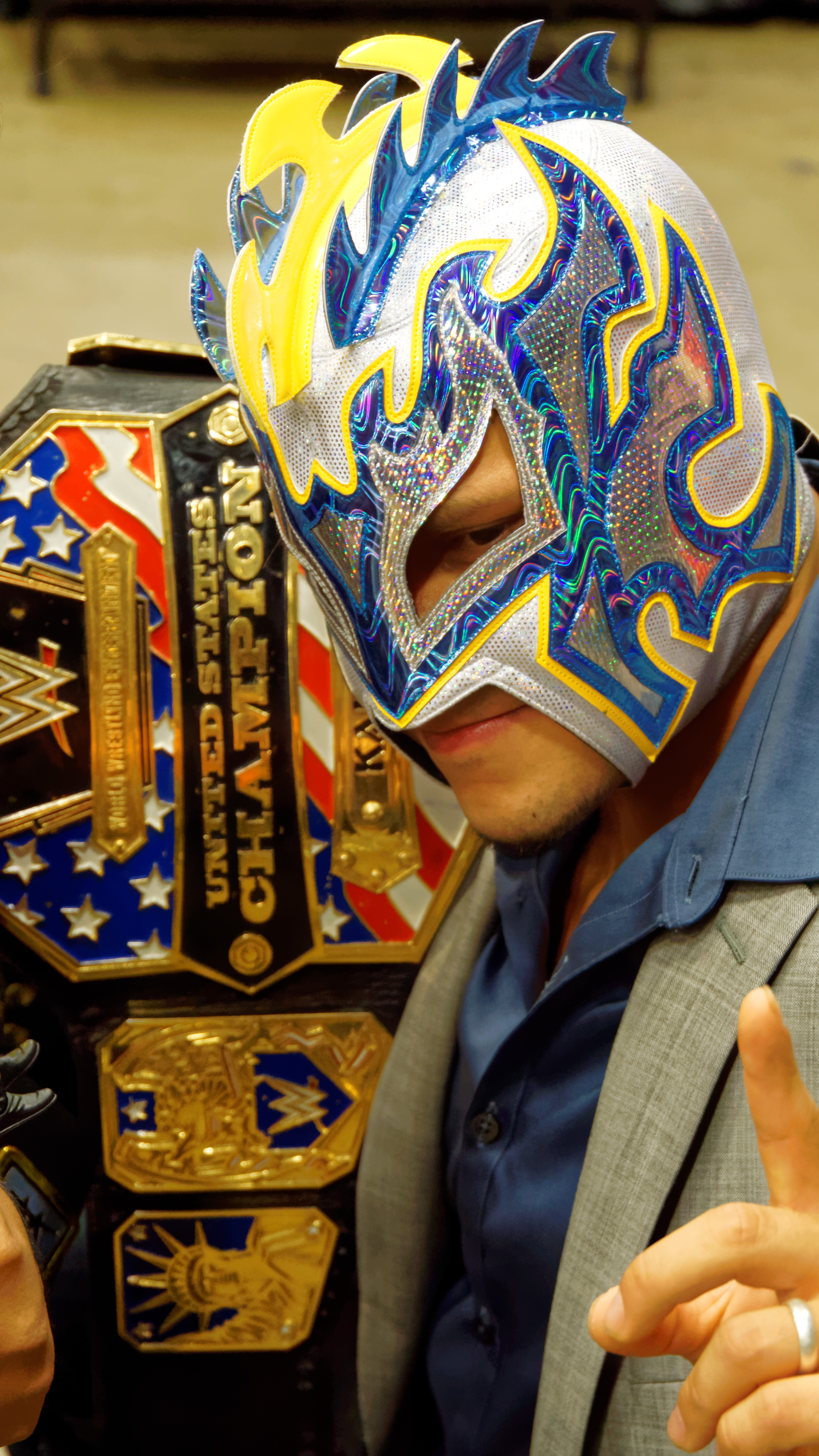
- Kalisto in 2016

Personal information
- Born: Emanuel Alejandro Rodriguez; November 14, 1986 (age 39) Chicago, Illinois, U.S.
- Website: www.samuraydelsol.com

Professional wrestling career
- Ring name(s): Kalisto; Octagón Jr. Samuray; Samuray del Sol
- Billed height: 5 ft 6 in (168 cm)
- Billed weight: 170 lb (77 kg)
- Billed from: Pilsen, Illinois; Mexico City
- Trained by: Billy Gunn; Dusty Rhodes; Gran Apache; Norman Smiley; Sara Amato; Windy City Pro Wrestling
- Debut: 2006

Emanuel Alejandro Rodriguez (born November 14, 1986) is a Mexican-American professional wrestler, currently performing on the independent circuit under the ring name Samuray Del Sol. He is best known for his time in WWE, where he worked with the ring name Kalisto.

In 2006, Rodriguez made his professional wrestling debut on the Midwestern United States independent circuit, working under a mask and the ring name Samuray del Sol (Spanish for "Samurai of the Sun"). After establishing himself as one of the top high-flyers in the area, he began working for larger promotions in 2011 & was signed by Dragon Gate USA in 2012. That year, he made his debut for mexican promotion AAA, where, in November, he was repackaged as Octagón Jr., the storyline protégé of well-known luchador Octagón. He also worked for Combat Zone Wrestling (CZW), Independent Wrestling Association Mid-South (IWA-MS), National Wrestling Alliance (NWA), Evolve Wrestling, and Pro Wrestling Guerrilla (PWG).

In May 2013, he signed with WWE and was assigned to their developmental territory NXT, where he was renamed Kalisto. In September 2014, Kalisto won the NXT Tag Team Championship alongside Sin Cara, as part of the Lucha Dragons. In February 2015, Kalisto was promoted to WWE's main roster, where he won the WWE United States Championship twice and the Cruiserweight Championship once. In early 2018, he formed a stable with fellow luchadors Gran Metalik and Lince Dorado, calling themselves Lucha House Party. He then separated from the group in late 2020, before being released from the WWE in April 2021.

== Early life ==
Emanuel Alejandro Rodriguez was born in the Pilsen neighborhood of Chicago on November 14, 1986. He is a second-generation Mexican-American. Though born in the United States, he spent his first years living in Mexico City. Rodriguez grew up a fan of Mexican professional wrestling, or lucha libre, especially workers like Tinieblas, whose mask and physique caught his attention, and Octagón, whose in-ring style impressed him. As a child, he bought both Tinieblas' and Octagón's replica masks. In the mid-1990s, when he was still in elementary school, his family moved back to Chicago but took regular trips to Mexico City. He started watching World Wrestling Federation (WWF), World Championship Wrestling (WCW), and Extreme Championship Wrestling (ECW), becoming influenced by the likes of Rey Mysterio, Rob Van Dam, and Sabu. While attending Curie Metropolitan High School, Rodriguez also started watching independent promotions like Ring of Honor (ROH) as well as Japanese promotions. Growing up, he participated in a number of sports, including gymnastics, taekwondo, jujutsu, amateur wrestling, and American football.

== Professional wrestling career ==
=== Early career (2006–2013) ===
In 2006, Rodriguez began training at Windy City Pro Wrestling's (WCPW) professional wrestling school in Chicago, where he was trained in not only American professional wrestling, but also lucha libre by a former AAA luchador. Rodriguez has later noted that his trainers were extremely strict on account of his youth, leading him to contemplate quitting the school. Rodriguez made his debut for WCPW after only three weeks of training. Combining his Mexican and Japanese influences, he adopted the ring name Samuray del Sol, choosing to use the spelling "Samuray" in order to differentiate himself from several other workers using the name Samurai. Much like his childhood idols, Rodriguez also began wrestling under a mask. During his first few years, Samuray began making a name for himself around the Midwestern United States independent circuit.

In 2010, Samuray began branching out of the Midwest, making his debuts for Pennsylvania-based International Wrestling Cartel (IWC) and New York–based East Coast Lucha Libre (ECLL). On September 25, 2010, Samuray worked in a dark match put together by Berwyn, Illinois-based AAW: Professional Wrestling Redefined for Dragon Gate USA (DGUSA), where he unsuccessfully challenged Silas Young for the AAW Heavyweight Championship in a three-way match, which also included Gran Akuma. During 2010, Samuray made his first wrestling tour of Mexico. During another tour of Mexico in April 2011, Rodriguez suffered a serious injury at an event held by independent promotion Desastre Total Ultraviolento (DTU), when he landed on the concrete floor and hit his head on a guardrail after diving out of the ring onto his opponents. In the aftermath of the injury, Rodriguez began suffering from post-concussion syndrome and fell into depression and contemplated retiring from professional wrestling before receiving a call to take part in a three-day tryout camp for WWE. Though he was not offered a contract, knowing that he was on WWE's radar reinvigorated Rodriguez to continue his career and return to the independent circuit.

=== Lucha Libre AAA Worldwide (2011–2013) ===
During mid-2011, Mexican luchador Crazy Boy, who saw Samuray during his Mexican debut, got him a spot in AAA's reality television program ¿Quién Pinta Para La Corona?. While taking part in the program, Samuray also returned to Crazy Boy's DTU promotion. During the taping of the program, he also underwent further training under veteran luchador Gran Apache, whom he credits with "perfecting [his] career". Although he did not earn a contract with AAA through the program, Samuray was able to make his AAA main card debut on August 19, 2012, when he teamed with Joe Líder and Juventud Guerrera in a six-man tag team match, where they were defeated by the villainous La Sociedad trio of Daga, Dark Dragon and Psicosis. During September, Samuray worked several multi-man tag team matches against Los Inferno Rockers (Devil Rocker, Machine Rocker, Soul Rocker and Uro Rocker), losing all of them.

While training with Teddy Hart in Canada, Samuray received a call from AAA booker Konnan, who offered him a regular spot on the promotion's roster. On October 7, 2012, at Héroes Inmortales, Samuray was placed in his first storyline in AAA, when he (was not identified, referred to only as a "mysterious fighter") approached Octagón backstage after a match. Shortly afterwards, AAA revealed that the fighter had been Samuray del Sol and that he had requested for Octagón to train him, which Octagón accepted after being impressed since seeing him on ¿Quién Pinta Para La Corona?. On November 15, Octagón was ambushed during an in-ring interview by El Consejo members Silver King and Toscano, who were quickly chased out of the ring by Samuray del Sol. Afterwards, Octagón gave Samuray a new mask similar to the one he was wearing himself and officially adopted him as his protégé, renaming him "Octagón Jr." Prior to making his in-ring debut as Octagón Jr., Samuray wrestled one final AAA match under his old name and mask, when on November 18 he teamed with AAA Mega Champion El Mesías to defeat El Consejo members El Texano Jr. and Silver King via disqualification. Octagón Jr. made his in-ring debut on December 2 at Guerra de Titanes, where he, Octagón and La Parka defeated his debuting storyline nemesis, Pentagón Jr., La Parka Negra and Silver King in a six-man tag team match. In May 2013, it was reported that AAA was looking to replace Samuray del Sol as Octagón Jr. due to his busy independent schedule preventing him from appearing for the promotion.

=== Various promotions (2012–2013) ===
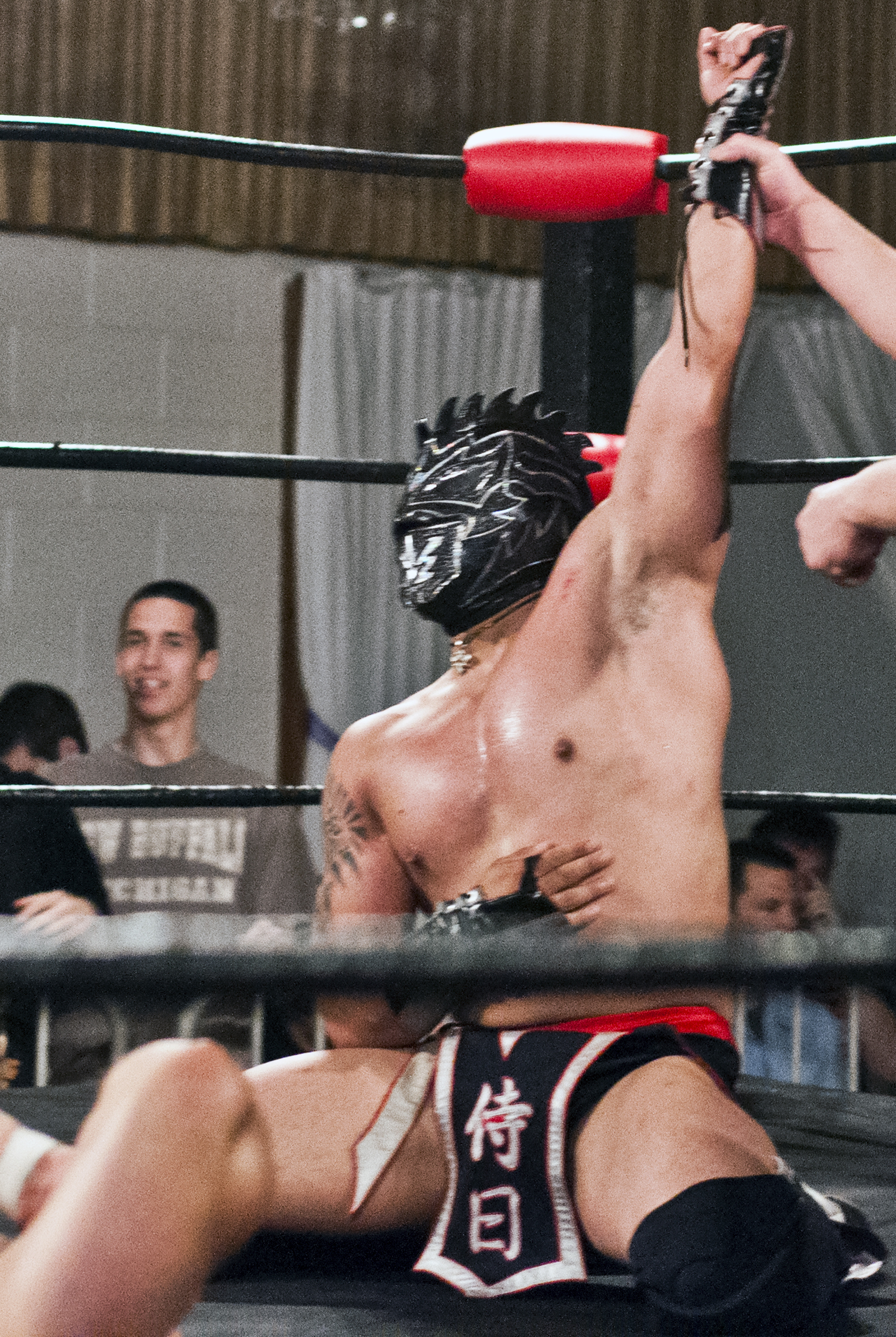
Samuray del Sol in May 2012

After returning from his ¿Quién Pinta Para La Corona? stint in Mexico, Samuray, looking to showcase the "new Samuray del Sol", made his debut for Combat Zone Wrestling (CZW) on February 4, 2012, in a match, where he was defeated by A. R. Fox. Samuray credits the match with opening doors for him to bigger promotions, including Dragon Gate USA. On March 10, Samuray and Uhaa Nation survived an eight-man elimination match to qualify for the Best of the Best 11 tournament. The tournament took place on internet pay-per-view on April 14 and saw Samuray defeat Chuck Taylor and Johnny Gargano in a three-way first round match. Later that same event, Samuray was defeated in his semifinal match by A. R. Fox.

In March 2012, Dragon Gate USA announced that the promotion had signed a "mystery luchador" to a contract. On March 29, Samuray made his Dragon Gate USA main card debut at an event co-promoted by DGUSA and CZW, appearing as Masato Yoshino's surprise opponent and defeating him in the following singles match. The following day, Samuray made his pay-per-view debut at Open the Ultimate Gate 2012, defeating Johnny Vandal. On the third and final day of the triple shot weekend, Samuray wrestled in a six-way match at Mercury Rising 2012, which was won by El Generico. On April 13, Samuray made his debut for Evolve, a promotion closely affiliated with Dragon Gate USA, losing to Chuck Taylor in a three-way match, which also included Johnny Gargano. Samuray then had two singles matches against El Generico; the first on June 28 at Evolve 14 was won by El Generico and the rematch the following day at Evolve 15 was won by Samuray. Samuray returned to Dragon Gate USA on July 28, when he and El Generico were defeated in a tag team match by A. R. Fox and Cima. Samuray and El Generico finished their trilogy of matches against each other on September 8 at Evolve 17, where Samuray was defeated in a main event. On November 4 at Dragon Gate USA's Freedom Fight 2012, Samuray teamed with El Generico in a tag team match, where they defeated Genki Horiguchi and Ryo Saito. The two continued their winning ways on December 8 at Evolve 18, where they defeated the Super Smash Bros. (Player Uno and Stupefied). Samuray then qualified for the Evolve Championship tournament, but was eliminated by Sami Callihan in his first round four-way match, which also included Jigsaw and Rich Swann. On June 2 at Evolve 22, Samuray unsuccessfully challenged Johnny Gargano for the Open the Freedom Gate Championship, submitting after being unmasked by the champion.

On December 14, 2012, Samuray del Sol entered the 2012 Jeff Peterson Memorial Cup, defeating Eddie Rios in his first round match. He went on to defeat Jonathan Gresham in the quarterfinals, Jon Davis in the semifinals and finally A. R. Fox in the finals to win the tournament. On January 18, 2013, Samuray del Sol worked on the Hart Legacy Wrestling (HLW) promotion's inaugural event in Calgary, Alberta, Canada. In the opening four-way elimination tag team match, he and El Generico were victorious over the teams of Cam!kaze and Pete Wilson, Brian Cage and Trent Barreta, and Andrew Hawkes and Ryan Rollins. As a result, the two earned a spot in a main event ten-man tag team match, where they teamed with Barreta, Davey Boy Smith Jr. and Jack Evans in a losing effort against the team of Teddy Hart, Brian Cage, Cam!kaze, Flip Kendrick and Pete Wilson. On March 15, Samuray del Sol made his debut for Full Impact Pro (FIP), unsuccessfully challenging Jon Davis for the FIP World Heavyweight Championship. On March 22, Samuray del Sol made his debut for Southern California-based Pro Wrestling Guerrilla (PWG), teaming with A. R. Fox in a tag team match, where they were defeated by the Inner City Machine Guns (Rich Swann and Ricochet). The following day, Samuray was defeated by T. J. Perkins at another PWG event. On March 24, Samuray del Sol defeated Paul London, A. R. Fox and Ricochet during a one night single-elimination tournament to become the 2013 King of Flight. On April 21, Samuray del Sol, as Octagón Jr., appeared at Puerto Rican promotion World Wrestling League's (WWL) inaugural pay-per-view, Idols of Wrestling, unsuccessfully challenging Sicodélico Jr. for the Zero1 Mexico International Championship in a four-way match, which also included Axel and El Hijo de Rey Mysterio. On May 25, Samuray del Sol appeared at English promotion Southside Wrestling Entertainment's (SWE) Speed King 2 tournament, losing to Marty Scurll in his first round match. After signing with WWE, Samuray del Sol wrestled his farewell match for his longtime home promotion, AAW, on June 28, where he and Colt Cabana were defeated by The Irish Airborne (Dave Crist and Jake Crist).

=== WWE (2013–2021) ===
==== Early years in NXT (2013–2014) ====
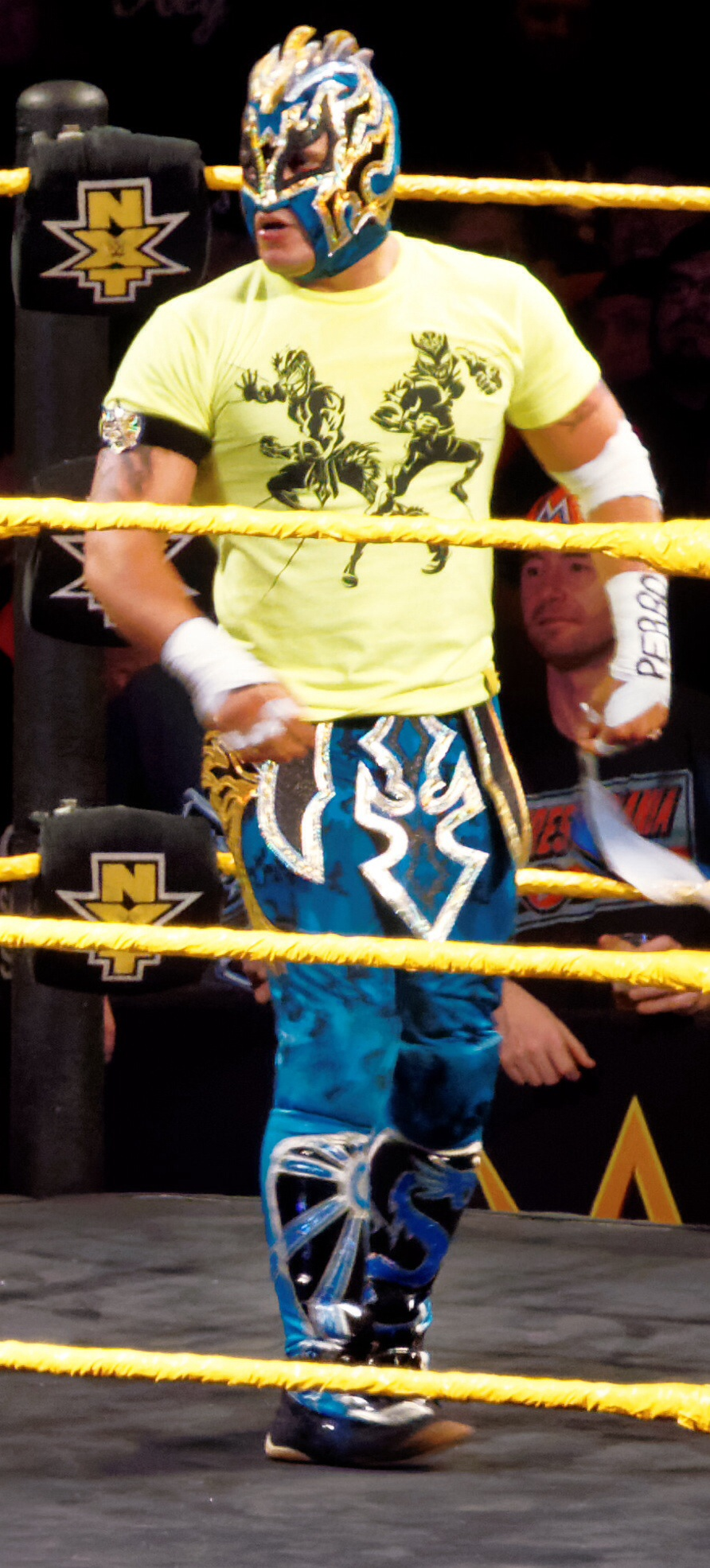
Kalisto in March 2015

In May 2013, it was reported that Rodriguez was undergoing pre-contract signing medical tests for WWE. On May 26, it was reported that he had signed a developmental contract with WWE. On August 29, Rodriguez's new ring name was revealed as "Kalisto". Kalisto made his NXT debut at a live event on September 20, defeating Baron Corbin. In April 2014, Kalisto formed a tag team with El Local, which led to him making his television debut on the May 8 NXT, where the two defeated the Legionnaires (Marcus Louis and Sylvester Lefort) in a tag team match. On May 29 at NXT TakeOver, Kalisto and El Local unsuccessfully challenged The Ascension (Konnor and Viktor) for the NXT Tag Team Championship.

==== The Lucha Dragons (2014–2015) ====
On the July 17, 2014 episode of NXT, Kalisto announced he and El Local had parted ways and the following week revealed Sin Cara as his new partner. Over the next weeks, Kalisto and Sin Cara won a tournament to become the number one contenders to the NXT Tag Team Championship. On September 11 at NXT TakeOver: Fatal 4-Way, Kalisto and Sin Cara, now billed together as "The Lucha Dragons", defeated The Ascension to become the new NXT Tag Team Champions. They lost the title to Wesley Blake and Buddy Murphy on January 15, 2015. The duo later failed to regain the title at NXT TakeOver: Rival.

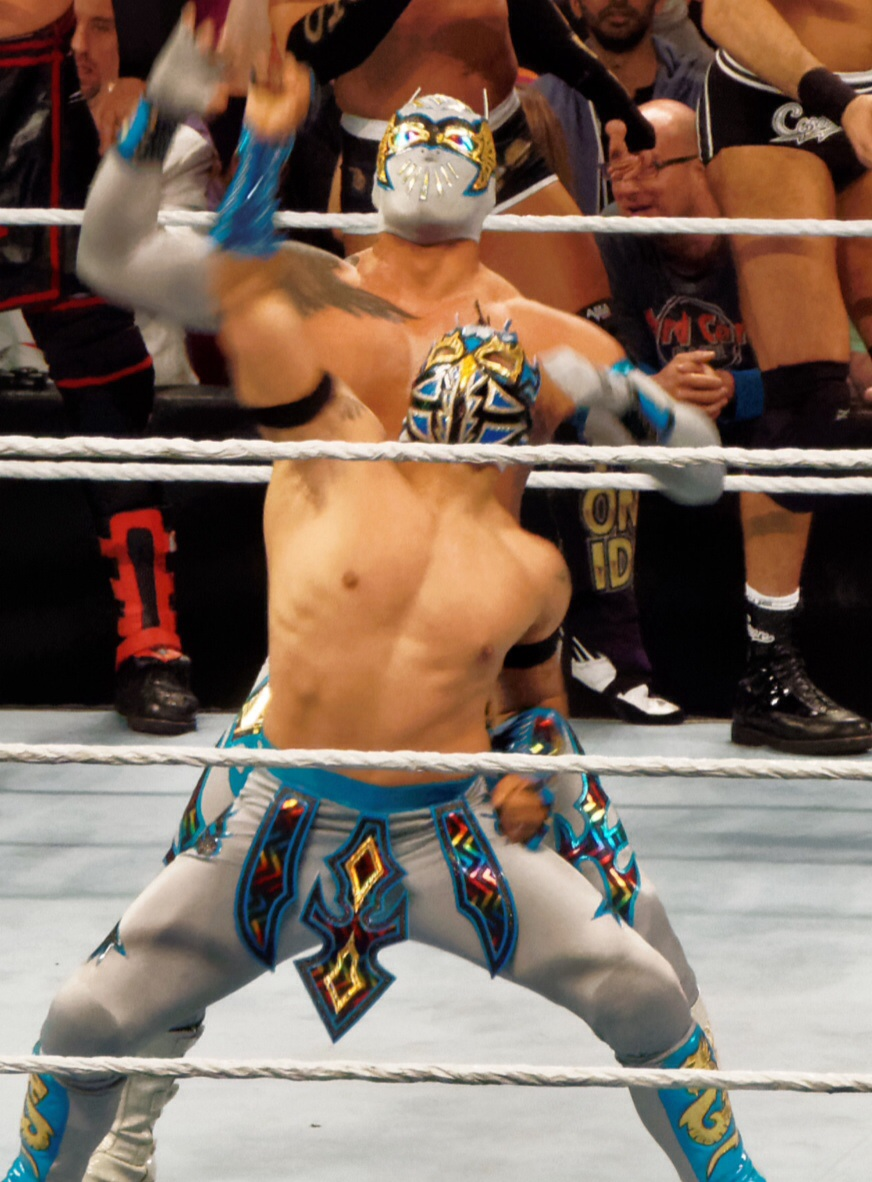
The Lucha Dragons in March 2015

On the February 17, 2015 episode of Main Event, Kalisto made his main roster debut in a tag team match, where he and Sin Cara defeated Curtis Axel and Heath Slater. On the March 30 episode of "Raw", Kalisto made his WWE television debut on Raw, where The Lucha Dragons and The New Day (Big E and Kofi Kingston) defeated then WWE Tag Team Champions Tyson Kidd and Cesaro and The Ascension in an eight-man tag team match. On May 31, at Elimination Chamber, The Lucha Dragons competed in the first-ever tag team Elimination Chamber match for the WWE Tag Team Championship, but failed to win. The Lucha Dragons received another title shot on August 23 at SummerSlam in a Fatal 4-Way match, but were once again unsuccessful. In November, after Seth Rollins vacated the WWE World Heavyweight Championship due to a legitimate injury, WWE held a tournament to determine a new champion. After defeating Ryback in his first round match on the November 12 SmackDown, Kalisto was eliminated in the quarterfinals on the November 16 episode of Raw by Alberto Del Rio. On December 13, at TLC: Tables, Ladders and Chairs, the Lucha Dragons received another shot at the WWE Tag Team Championship, but were defeated by The New Day in a triple-threat ladder match, which also included The Usos (Jey and Jimmy). The Lucha Dragons once again failed to win the WWE Tag Team Championship on the December 22 Super SmackDown Live!, where they were defeated by The New Day.

==== United States Champion (2015–2016) ====
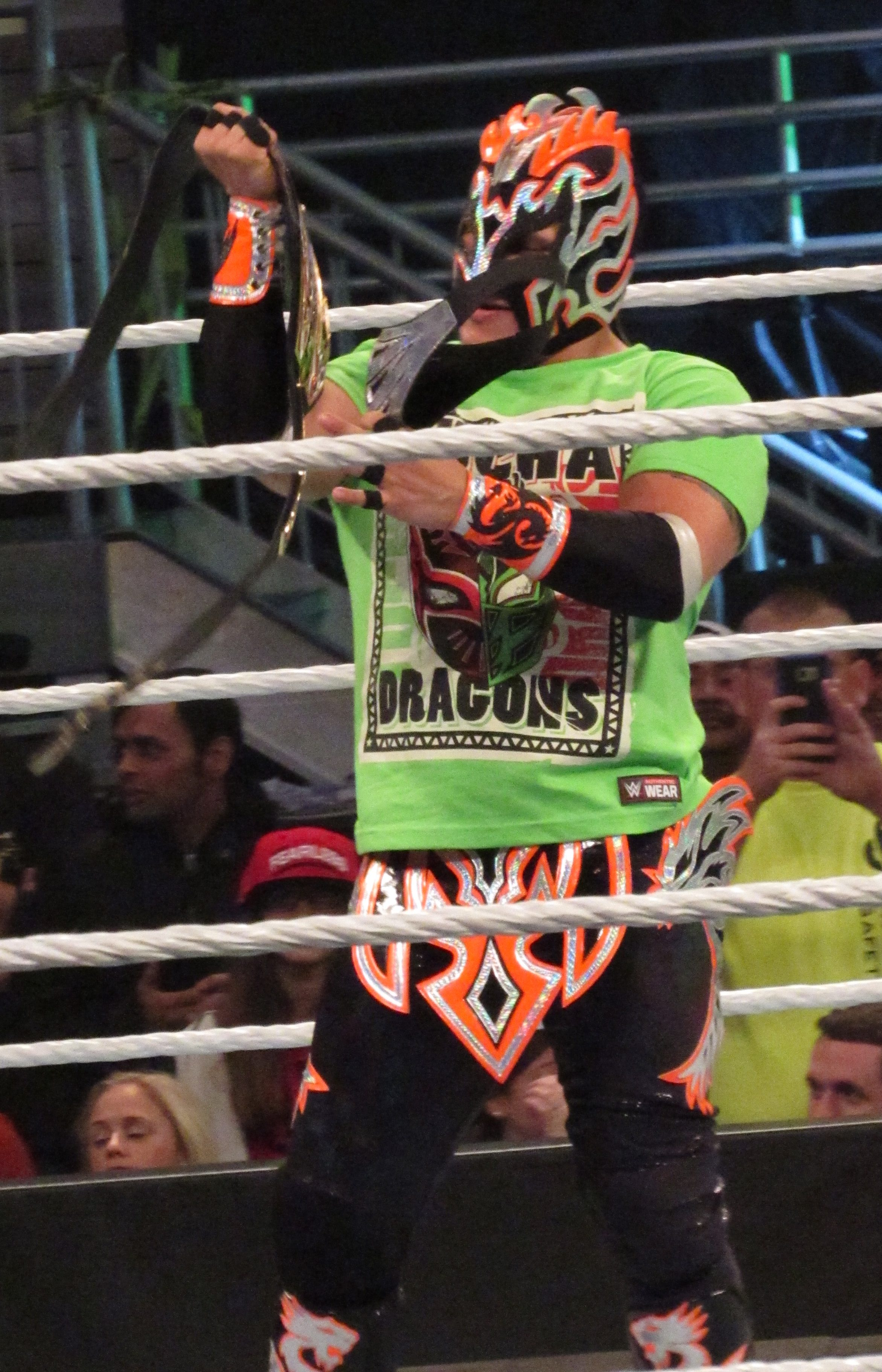
Kalisto posing with the United States Championship belt in January 2016

After Sin Cara had been sidelined with a shoulder injury, Kalisto defeated United States Champion Alberto Del Rio in a non-title match with John Cena in his corner on the January 7 episode of SmackDown. Four days later on Raw, Kalisto defeated Del Rio in a rematch to win the United States Championship, his first championship on the main roster and his first singles title in WWE. However, Kalisto lost the title back to Del Rio on the January 14 episode of SmackDown, following a distraction from King Barrett. Kalisto regained the title from Del Rio on January 24 at Royal Rumble, making him a two-time United States Champion. On the January 28 episode of SmackDown, Kalisto made his first televised title defense against Neville, where he was successful in retaining the championship. On February 21, Kalisto defeated Del Rio two falls to one in a two-out-of-three falls match on the Fastlane pre-show to retain the United States Championship. Kalisto then accepted a challenge from Ryback for a title match at WrestleMania 32 over the question of whether a "good little man" could beat a "good big man". The match ended up taking place on the WrestleMania 32 pre-show with Kalisto retaining the title. On the April 11 episode of Raw, Kalisto and Sin Cara entered a tournament to determine number one contenders to the WWE Tag Team Championship, but were eliminated in the first round by The Dudley Boyz. On the April 21 episode of SmackDown, Kalisto was defeated by Ryback in a non-title rematch. With Ryback's win, a United States Championship match was set between the two, taking place on May 1 at the Payback pre-show, where Kalisto retained the title. On May 22 at Extreme Rules, Kalisto lost the title to Rusev ending his reign at 119 days. Kalisto received a rematch for the title on the May 26 episode of SmackDown, but was again defeated by Rusev. On July 18, Kalisto and Sin Cara announced they were done as a tag team and entering the 2016 WWE draft as singles competitors.

On July 19, Kalisto was drafted to the SmackDown brand in the 2016 WWE draft. On the August 2 episode of SmackDown, Kalisto participated in a three-way match to determine the number one contender to the WWE Intercontinental Championship, which was won by Apollo Crews and also included Baron Corbin. After being injured, he returned to the ring at a house show on October 22. On the November 8 episode of SmackDown, Kalisto faced the man who had injured him months earlier, Baron Corbin. Before the match, Corbin slipped on the ring apron and appeared to injure his leg, which led to Kalisto attacking the leg and the match being thrown out as a no contest. Afterwards, it was announced that Kalisto would face Raw's Brian Kendrick for the WWE Cruiserweight Championship at Survivor Series with an added stipulation stating that should Kalisto capture the title, the entire cruiserweight division would move to SmackDown. The title match ended in a disqualification win for Kendrick due to him being attacked by Corbin, who afterwards also attacked Kalisto. A few nights later on SmackDown, Corbin cost Kalisto his match against The Miz for the WWE Intercontinental Championship by distracting him. This led to a chairs match on December 4 at TLC: Tables, Ladders & Chairs, where Kalisto was defeated by Corbin.

==== Cruiserweight Champion (2017–2018) ====
On January 29, 2017, at Royal Rumble, Kalisto took part in his first Royal Rumble match, entering as number three and being eliminated by Braun Strowman. On April 10, 2017, Kalisto was moved to the Raw brand as part of the Superstar Shake-up. He was attacked the following week by Braun Strowman, who threw him inside a dumpster, setting up a dumpster match on the April 24 episode of Raw, which Kalisto won. Following the match, Strowman put Kalisto in the dumpster and then proceeded to push it off the entrance ramp, resulting in Kalisto suffering storyline "hip and cervical trauma". After returning, Kalisto engaged in a feud with Apollo Crews over Crews' involvement with Titus O'Neil's Titus Brand, which resulted in a match on June 4 at the Extreme Rules pre-show, where Kalisto defeated Crews.

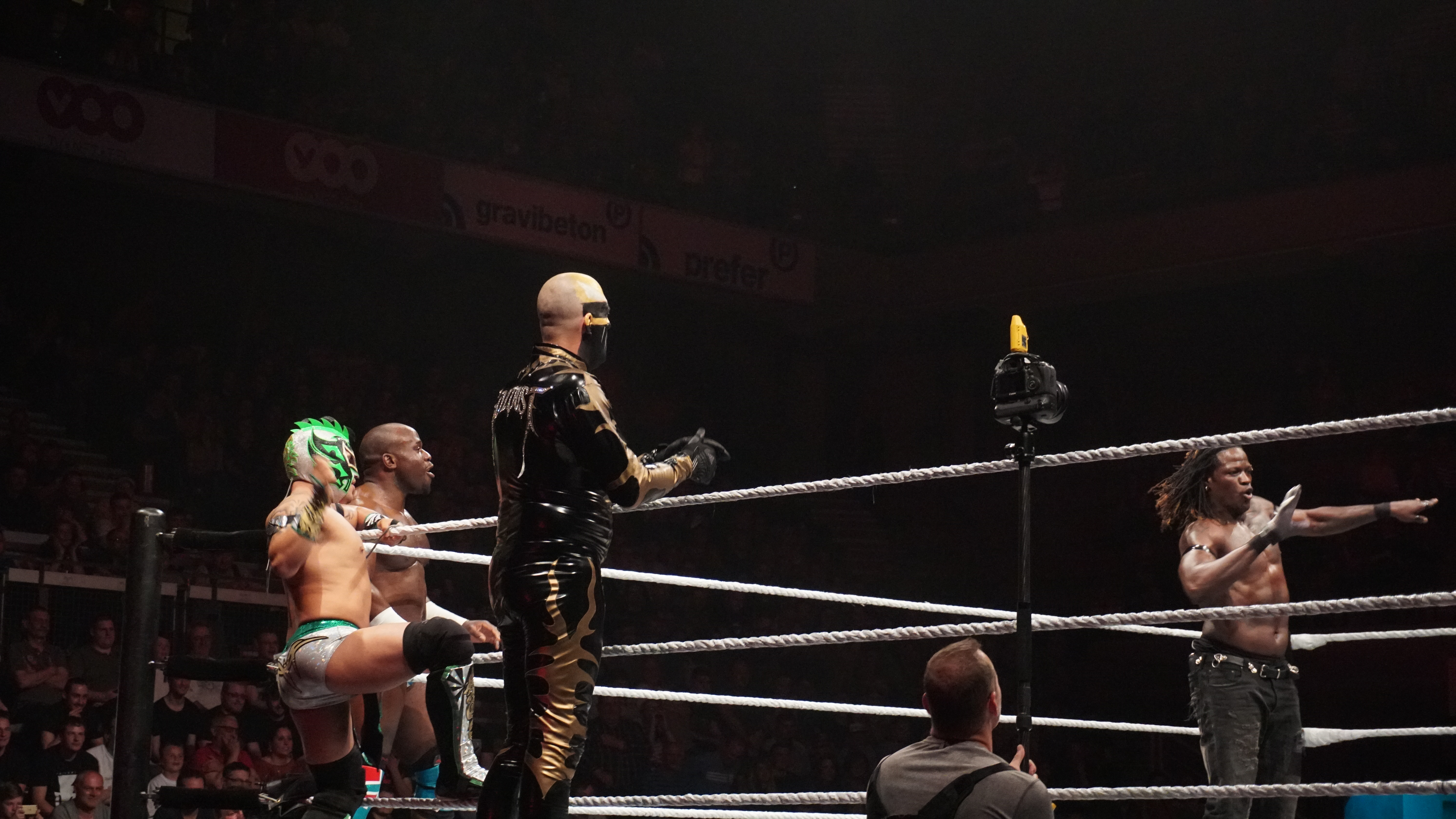
Kalisto at a WWE Live event tour in a 8-Man tag team match teaming with Apollo Crews, Goldust and R-Truth, May 12, 2017

On the October 2 episode of Raw, Kalisto returned as the newest member of the cruiserweight division. As all other members of the division had broken WWE Cruiserweight Champion Enzo Amore's "no contact" clause and were not eligible to challenge him for the title, general manager Kurt Angle signed Kalisto to the division as Amore's next challenger. The following day, Kalisto defeated Ariya Daivari in his 205 Live debut. On the October 9 episode Raw, Kalisto defeated Amore in a main event lumberjack match to become the new Cruiserweight Champion. It was reported that Kalisto was a late replacement for Neville, who did not appear at the show. He lost the title back to Amore on October 22 at TLC: Tables, Ladders & Chairs, failing to regain it in a rematch on November 19 at the Survivor Series kickoff show. Kalisto failed to regain the championship from Cedric Alexander at the Greatest Royal Rumble event on April 27, 2018.

==== Lucha House Party (2018–2021) ====
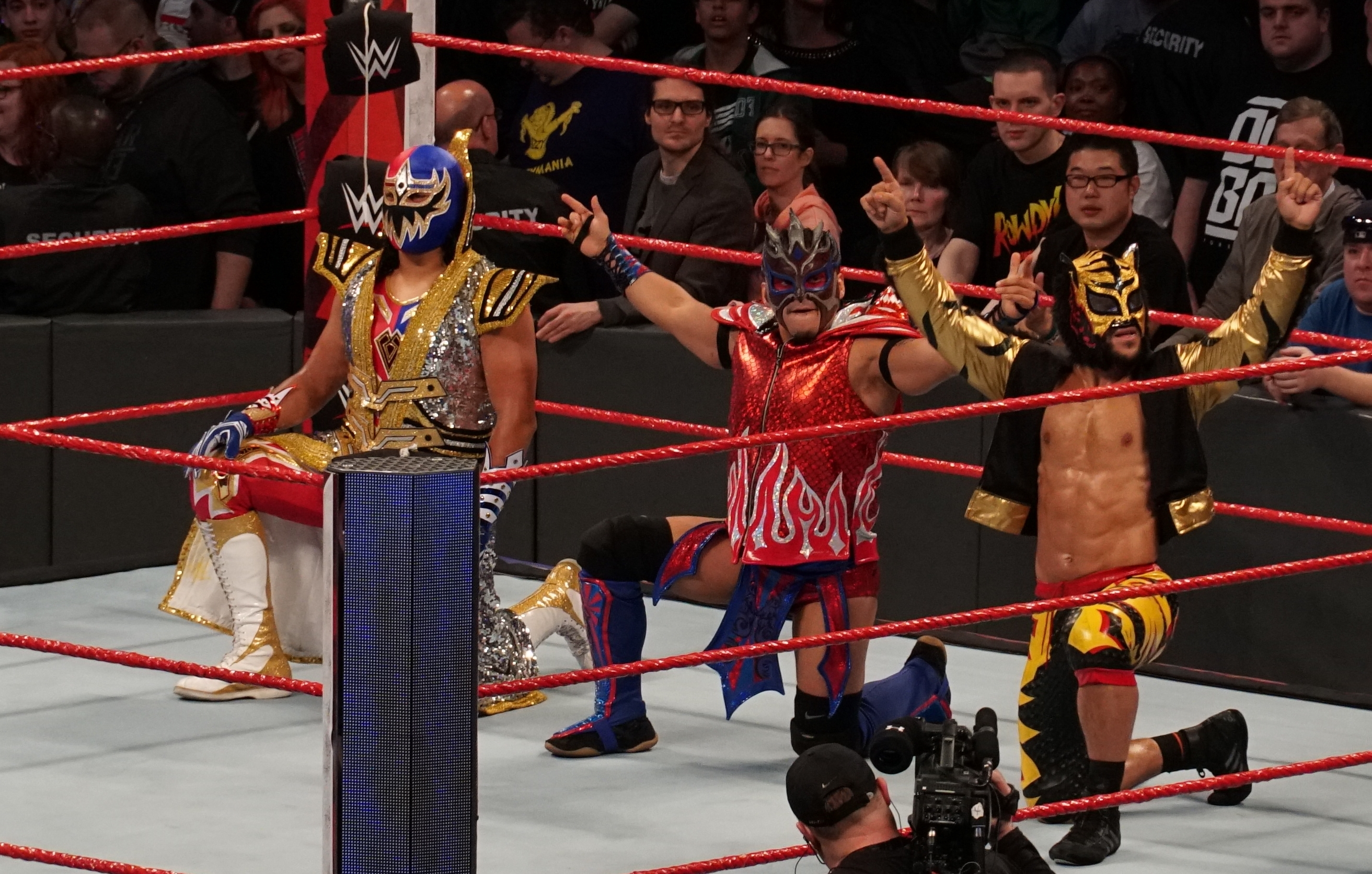
Lucha House Party - Kalisto (middle), Gran Metalik (left), and Lince Dorado (right), in April 2018

After failing to regain the title, Kalisto would begin a partnership with fellow luchadors Gran Metalik and Lince Dorado, with the trio dubbing themselves "Lucha House Party". As part of their gimmick, the luchadors started to carry brightly colored noise makers and vuvuzela horns with them, using them to celebrate after a victory. They also carried a brightly colored Piñata donkey with them to the ring, which they referred to as "Penelope". Their first match as a full trio took place on January 23, 2018, episode of 205 Live, as they defeated Ariya Daivari, TJP, and Tony Nese. At the Royal Rumble, Lucha House Party defeated TJP, Drew Gulak, and Gentleman Jack Gallagher.

On the November 12 episode of Raw, Lucha House Party competed against a number of non-Cruiserweight teams for the first time since WWE put them together, as they competed in a battle royal against Raw tag teams such as Bobby Roode and Chad Gable, The B-Team (Bo Dallas and Curtis Axel), Heath Slater and Rhyno, The Ascension (Konnor and Viktor), and The Revival (Dash Wilder and Scott Dawson). At the Survivor Series, Lucha House Party was part of Team Raw in a five on five team elimination match, that was won by Team SmackDown. In subsequent weeks, Lucha House Party was part of a storyline with The Revival, where the latter claimed to be "tag team purists" and as such objected to Lucha House Party being allowed to compete as a tag team when there was three of them. In the following weeks, Lucha House Party defeated The Revival in various three-on-two, or three-on-one matches billed as "Lucha House Rules" matches as part of the storyline. On the February 4, 2019 episode of Raw, The Revival finally defeated Lucha House Party as part of a fatal four-way match to earn a match for the WWE Raw Tag Team Championship at a later date. In June, Lucha House Party began a feud with Lars Sullivan, with the trio losing to Sullivan via disqualification in a three-on-one handicap match at Super ShowDown. The following night on Raw, Lucha House Party was again defeated by Sullivan, this time in a three-on-one handicap elimination match.

On October 11, Lucha House Party was drafted to SmackDown brand as part of the 2019 WWE Draft. At the Survivor Series kickoff, Kalisto faced Raw's Akira Tozawa and NXT's Lio Rush for Rush's Cruiserweight Championship but failed to capture the title. In December, Kalisto suffered an injury in the shoulder. Kalisto returned on the August 14, 2020 episode of SmackDown, reuniting with his Lucha House Party teammates. They lost to Shinsuke Nakamura and Cesaro at WWE Clash of Champions for the Smackdown Tag Team Championship. Months before the 2020 WWE Draft, Kalisto asked to leave the stable and going solo and the separation took place at the Draft, when he remained on SmackDown while Metalik and Dorado were drafted to Raw. Kalisto's only match on SmackDown following the draft, would be on the April 9, 2021 episode when he competed in the Andre the Giant Memorial Battle Royal which he failed to win. On April 15, 2021, Kalisto was released from his WWE contract, ending his near 8-year tenure with the company.

=== All Elite Wrestling (2021) ===
On the November 3, 2021 episode of AEW Dynamite, Samuray del Sol teamed up with Aero Star in a losing effort against FTR for the AAA World Tag Team Championship.

=== Major League Wrestling (2022–2023) ===
On May 12, 2022, in Major League Wrestling (MLW) episode of MLW Fusion Kalisto as Octagón Jr. won the MLW Caribbean Championship against King Muertes, El Dragon, and Hijo de L.A. Park in a Fatal 4 Way Cyclone match. On January 6, 2023, Kalisto as Octagón Jr. was stripped of the MLW Caribbean Championship by Savio Vega over failure to defend the title. Also after this vacancy the title no longer became a part of MLW but once more a part of International Wrestling Association of Puerto Rico.

=== DDT Pro-Wrestling (2023) ===
On March 21, 2023, at Judgement, Samuray Del Sol made his DDT Pro-Wrestling debut in a losing effort to Yuki Ueno.

== Other media ==
Kalisto appears as a playable character in the video games WWE 2K16, WWE 2K17, WWE 2K18, WWE 2K19, WWE 2K20, WWE 2K22 and WWE 2K Battlegrounds, and had an uncredited role in the 2016 film Countdown.

== Personal life ==
Rodriguez is married to Abigail. In August 2021, Rodriguez was hospitalized due to COVID-19 and said that "COVID nearly ended me", having a stomach ulcer and two heart attacks.

== Championships and accomplishments ==
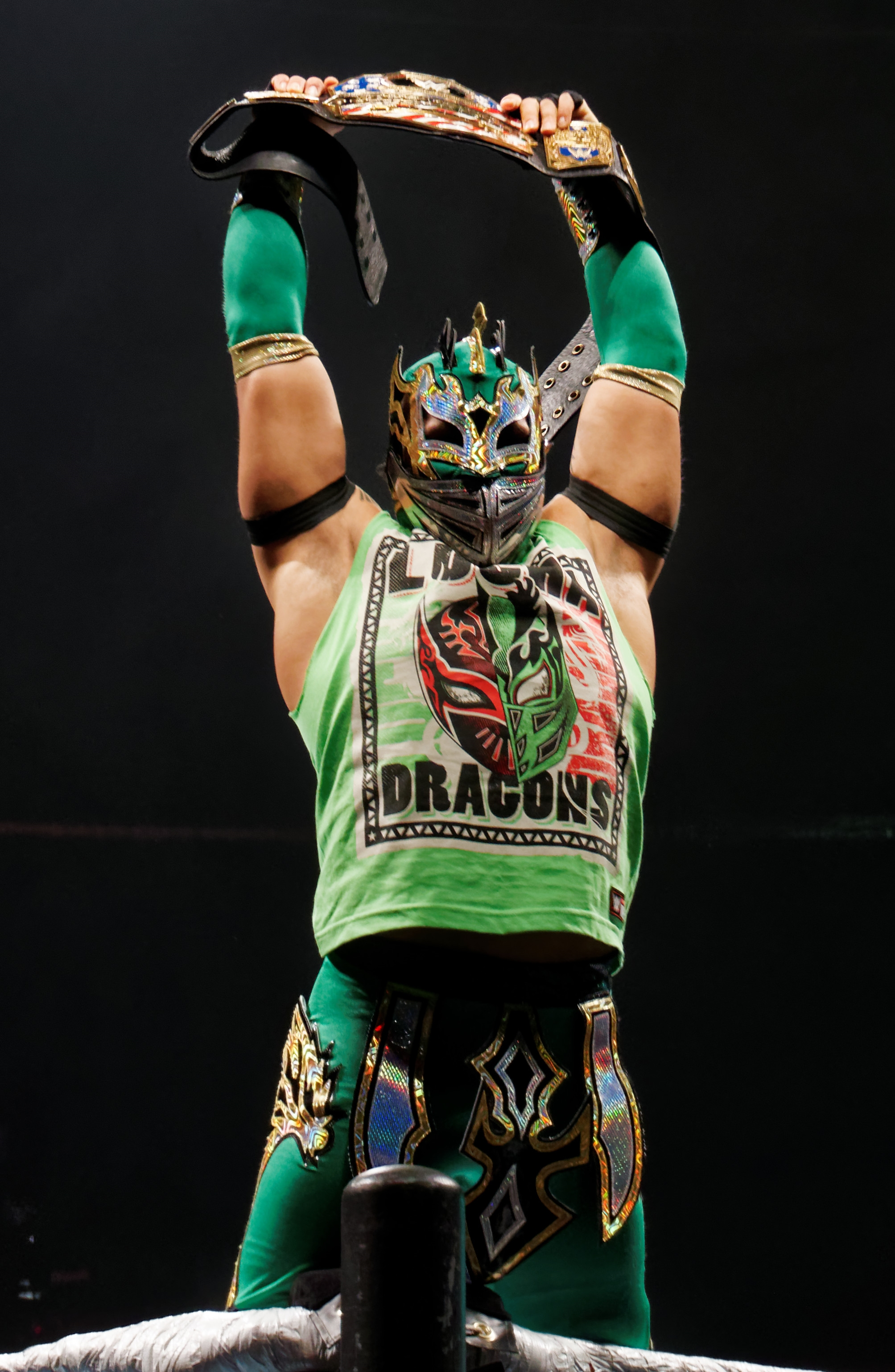
Kalisto is a two-times United States Champion.

- Gladiadores Aztecas de Lucha Libre Internacional
  - GALLI Championship (1 time)
- Major League Wrestling
  - MLW Caribbean Heavyweight Championship (1 time)
- Pro Wrestling Illustrated
  - Ranked No. 25 of the top 500 singles wrestlers in the PWI 500 in 2016
- Robles Promotions
  - Robles Heavyweight Championship (1 time, inaugural)
- Saudi Pro Wrestling
  - SPW Tag Team Championship (2 times) – with MK (1) and Lince Dorado (1)
- The Wrestling Revolver
  - Revolver World Tag Team Championship (1 time) – with Lince Dorado
- WWE
  - WWE United States Championship (2 times)
  - WWE Cruiserweight Championship (1 time)
  - NXT Tag Team Championship (1 time) – with Sin Cara
  - NXT Tag Team Championship #1 Contender's Tournament (2014) – with Sin Cara
  - Slammy Award for OMG Shocking Moment of the Year (2015) – Executing a Salida del Sol off the top of a ladder on Jey Uso at TLC: Tables, Ladders & Chairs
- Other accomplishments
  - Jeff Peterson Memorial Cup (2012)
  - King of Flight Tournament (2013)
