= NXT TakeOver: Vengeance Day =

2021 WWE pay-per-view and livestreaming event

- Promotional poster featuring Pete Dunne, Finn Bálor, Toni Storm, Mercedes Martinez, and Io Shirai.
- Promotion: WWE
- Brand: NXT
- Date: February 14, 2021
- City: Orlando, Florida
- Venue: Capitol Wrestling Center at WWE Performance Center
- Attendance: 0 (behind closed doors) (Note: The event was held without a paying audience due to the COVID-19 pandemic in the United States, though it featured a live crowd of WWE wrestlers, trainees, and select invited fans as well as virtual fans via NXT's Capitol Wrestling Center viewing experience.)

WWE event chronology
← Previous; Royal Rumble	Next → Elimination Chamber

NXT TakeOver chronology
← Previous; WarGames	Next → Stand & Deliver

Vengeance chronology
← Previous; Vengeance (2011)	Next → NXT Vengeance Day (2022)

NXT TakeOver: Vengeance Day was a 2021 professional wrestling pay-per-view (PPV) and livestreaming event produced by WWE, held exclusively for wrestlers from the promotion's NXT brand division. It was simultaneously the 33rd NXT TakeOver event, NXT's inaugural Vengeance Day, and WWE's ninth Vengeance overall. Due to the COVID-19 pandemic, the event took place on February 14, 2021, from the Capitol Wrestling Center, a bio-secure bubble that was hosted at the WWE Performance Center in Orlando, Florida.

The event revived WWE's Vengeance PPV name, but altered as Vengeance Day, thus it was the first Vengeance held since 2011. The event's altered name was also a play on Valentine's Day, as the event was held on the holiday, with Vengeance Day subsequently becoming an annual event for NXT, although this was the only one held as a TakeOver event as the TakeOver series was discontinued after TakeOver 36 in August. This would also be the first Vengeance to air on the WWE Network. It was subsequently the final TakeOver event and only Vengeance to air on the Indian and American versions of the WWE Network before they merged under SonyLIV and Peacock on February 21 and April 4, respectively, which also made it WWE's final event to livestream on the Indian WWE Network before the switchover to SonyLIV. This would also be the final Vengeance to air on traditional PPV, as the following year's event was held as a television special, and although the 2023 event returned to livestreaming, WWE ceased broadcasting NXT's major events on PPV after WarGames in December.

Five matches were contested at the event. In the main event, Finn Bálor defeated Pete Dunne to retain the NXT Championship. In other prominent matches, MSK (Nash Carter and Wes Lee) defeated Grizzled Young Veterans (James Drake and Zack Gibson) to win the Men's Dusty Rhodes Tag Team Classic, while in the opening bout, Dakota Kai and Raquel González defeated Ember Moon and Shotzi Blackheart to win the inaugural Women's Dusty Rhodes Tag Team Classic. Vengeance Day also marked the WWE return of LA Knight, who previously performed as Slate Randall from 2013 to 2014 and was known as Eli Drake in Impact Wrestling (now Total Nonstop Action Wrestling).

== Production ==
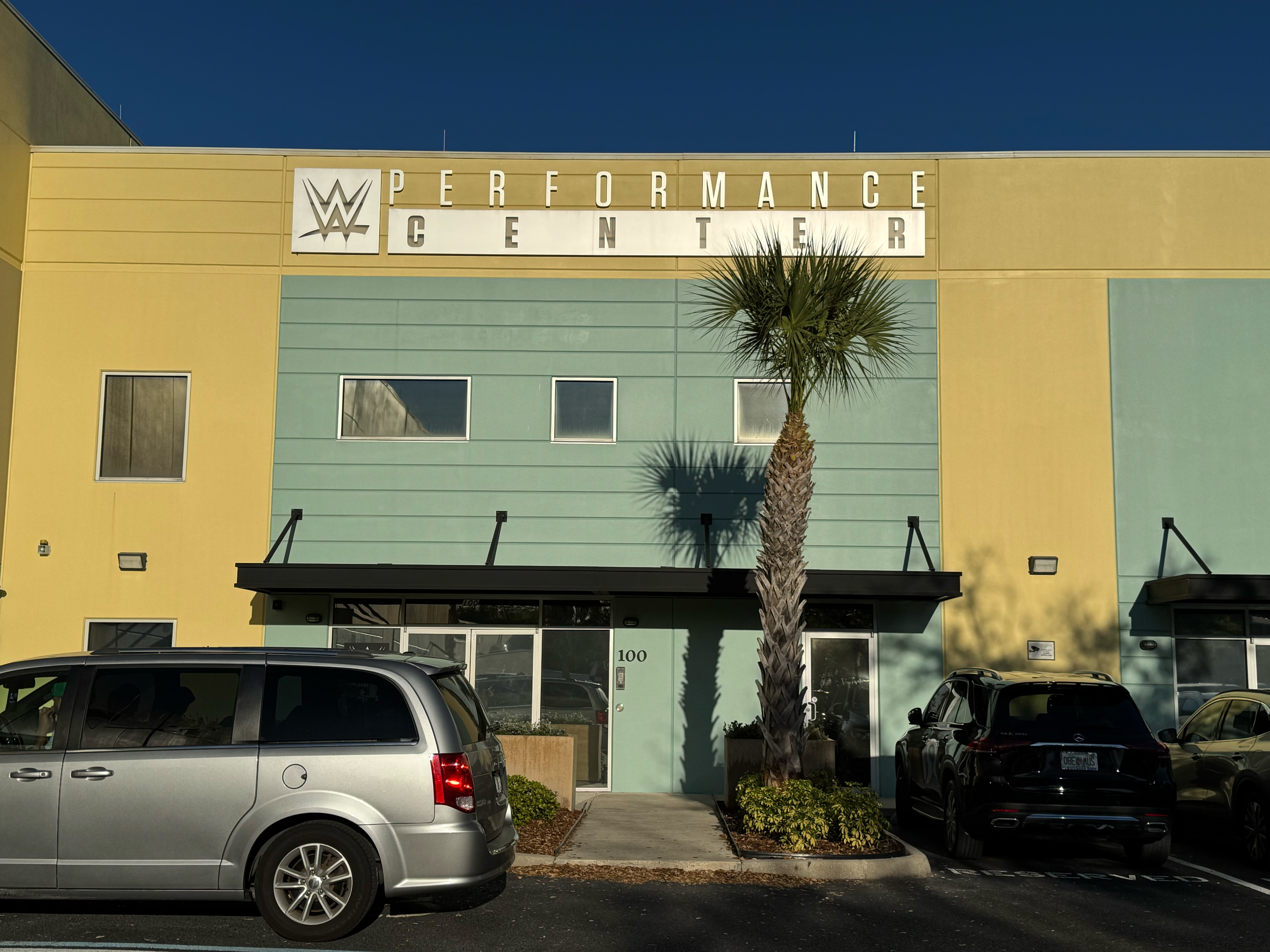
Due to the COVID-19 pandemic, the 33rd NXT TakeOver event, which was the ninth Vengeance and first annual NXT Vengeance Day, was produced by way of a bio-secure bubble called the Capitol Wrestling Center, which was hosted at the WWE Performance Center in Orlando, Florida.

=== Background ===
TakeOver was a series of professional wrestling events that began in May 2014, as WWE's NXT brand held its second WWE Network-exclusive livestreaming event, billed as TakeOver. The "TakeOver" moniker subsequently became the branding for all of NXT's major events held periodically throughout the year. While originally exclusive to the WWE Network, NXT TakeOver events also became available on traditional pay-per-view (PPV) beginning with TakeOver 31 in October 2020.

Announced on January 6, 2021, Vengeance Day was scheduled as the 33rd TakeOver event. It revived WWE's old Vengeance name, which was an annual PPV event held from 2001 to 2007 followed by one event in 2011. With the scheduling of Vengeance Day, it reinstated Vengeance as an NXT TakeOver event, making it WWE's ninth Vengeance overall, the first since 2011, the first brand-exclusive Vengeance since 2006, and the first Vengeance to livestream on the WWE Network in addition to traditional PPV. The name of the event was also a play on Valentine's Day, as the event was held on February 14, 2021, the same day as the holiday. The official theme song for the event was "Obey" by Bring Me the Horizon featuring Yungblud.

==== Impact of the COVID-19 pandemic ====
As a result of the COVID-19 pandemic that began affecting the industry in mid-March 2020, WWE had to present the majority of its programming from a behind closed doors set. NXT's programming was initially held at NXT's home venue at the time, Full Sail University in Winter Park, Florida. In October 2020, NXT's events were moved to the Capitol Wrestling Center, a bio-secure bubble that was hosted at the WWE Performance Center in Orlando, Florida. Like the WWE ThunderDome utilized for Raw and SmackDown's programming, LED boards were placed around the Performance Center so that fans could attend virtually, while additionally and unlike the ThunderDome, friends and family members of the wrestlers were in attendance, along with a limited number of actual live fans, divided from each other by plexiglass walls.

=== Storylines ===
The card included matches that resulted from scripted storylines. Results were predetermined by WWE's writers on the NXT brand, while storylines were produced on WWE's weekly television program, NXT.

On the February 3 episode of NXT, after weeks of setting his sights on the NXT Championship, Pete Dunne demanded Finn Bálor to give him a title match. Bálor then came to the ring and told Dunne he would get his match at Vengeance Day. Men's Royal Rumble winner Edge then came to the ring. He spoke about how seeing the drive, passion, and focus on wrestling in NXT helped motivate him to make his comeback. He said he had never held the NXT Championship and told Bálor and Dunne that he would be watching their match at Vengeance Day, and regardless of who won, it may help him decide which world championship he would challenge for at WrestleMania 37.

In January 2021, the sixth Dusty Rhodes Tag Team Classic was announced, and for the first time, a women's version was also announced. The finals of both the men's and women's tournaments were scheduled for Vengeance Day.

At TakeOver: WarGames in December 2020, Toni Storm's team came out victorious against NXT Women's Champion Io Shirai's team in a WarGames match. On the December 9 episode of NXT, while Storm was being interviewed, Shirai and Ember Moon attacked her. Two weeks later, Shirai called out Storm, but when the latter did not show up, Mercedes Martinez attacked Shirai from behind. On the January 20, 2021, episode, Shirai caused Martinez and Storm to lose in the first round of the inaugural women's Dusty Rhodes Tag Team Classic. The following week, Shirai and Storm brawled, and Martinez got involved, but Storm stood tall in the end. On January 29, a triple threat match between Storm, Martinez, and Shirai for the title was scheduled for Vengeance Day.

On the December 16 episode of NXT, during a tag team match, NXT North American Champion Johnny Gargano shoved Kushida off the apron, causing Gargano's team to win. At NXT: New Year's Evil on January 6, 2021, Kushida pinned Gargano in a tag team match. The following week, after Gargano won his match, Gargano attacked his opponent until Kushida made the save. Kushida then stated that he would be coming for the NXT North American Championship. On the January 20 episode, Kushida pinned Gargano in a first round match of the 2021 Men's Dusty Rhodes Tag Team Classic. Two weeks later, Gargano and Kushida brawled backstage, and a title match between the two was scheduled for Vengeance Day.

== Event ==
Other on-screen personnel
Role:	Name:
Commentators	Vic Joseph
Commentators	Wade Barrett
Commentators	Beth Phoenix
Spanish commentators	Carlos Cabrera
Spanish commentators	Marcelo Rodríguez
Ring announcer	Alicia Taylor
Referees	Drake Wuertz
Referees	Darryl Sharma
Referees	D. A. Brewer
Referees	Tom Castor
Interviewer	McKenzie Mitchell
Pre-show panel	Sam Roberts
Pre-show panel	Wade Barrett
Pre-show panel	Brandon Walker

=== Preliminary matches ===
The event opened with the finals of the first-ever women's Dusty Rhodes Tag Team Classic between the team of Ember Moon and Shotzi Blackheart and the team of Dakota Kai and Raquel González. The match was fast-paced and largely competitive throughout; only Kai was isolated by the opposing tag team for any prolonged stretch, though she was eventually able to tag in González. Kai hit the Kai-Ro-Practor for a nearfall, as did Blackheart with her signature finishing senton. Kai and González also utilized a double-team version of Kai's Go 2 Kick signature maneuver, which involves elevating the opponent before dropping them and kicking them in the face as they fall. The end of the match came when González tossed Moon from the entrance ramp, enabling her and Kai to focus on Blackheart. González performed the Chingona Bomb on Blackheart, and both she and Kai made the cover for the decisive pinfall. This made Kai and González the tournament champions and recipients of a future opportunity at the WWE Women's Tag Team Championship.

Next came the NXT North American Championship match, with the champion Johnny Gargano defending against Kushida. Kushida held the offensive advantage for the majority of the match, targeting Gargano's left arm. This both set up Kushida's Hoverboard Lock finisher and impaired the left-handed Gargano from executing normal offence like punches and chops. Gargano in turn was able work over Kushida's head and neck to set up his own finisher, the One Final Beat. In the finishing sequence, Kushida hit a running kick to Gargano's arm while the two were on the entrance ramp (which, in contrast to most WWE events, was level with the ring apron) and locked in the Hoverboard Lock in the ring. Gargano managed to stand and entangle Kushida's neck in the ropes, forcing him to release the hold. Gargano then hit One Final Beat twice, first from the inside of the ring to the entrance ramp, and secondly from the ramp to the inside of the ring, successfully securing the victory and retaining the championship.

MSK, the team of Nash Carter and Wes Lee, then faced the Grizzled Young Veterans, the team of James Drake and Zack Gibson, in the finals of the men's Dusty Rhodes Tag Team Classic. The match was fast-paced and full of innovative spots, including the Veterans performing a version of the Road Warriors's Doomsday Device outside the ring as Gibson held Carter on his shoulders as Drake dove through the ropes to perform a clothesline and knock him down. Drake also performed a 450 splash, noted as a maneuver not often utilized by the "no nonsense" team, for a nearfall. Though the Veterans isolated Carter for large portions of the match, he eventually tagged in Lee and the two performed some double-team maneuvers of their own, including an aided standing moonsault where Carter jumped clean over a crouching Drake to land on Gibson. The finish came when the Veterans attempted to perform their Ticket to Mayhem tandem finisher on Carter, only for Lee to break it up. He then tagged himself into the match and MSK performed an elevated corkscrew blockbuster onto Drake, this move earning the pinfall to make them tournament champions and earn a future match for the NXT Tag Team Championship.

The triple threat match for the NXT Women's Championship followed, champion Io Shirai defending against Mercedes Martinez and Toni Storm. Martinez was the aggressor early in the match, beginning her assault on her opponents before ring introductions were even made. The match kept a high pace throughout, and all three women hit their finishers. Shirai also executed a dive off the rigging for some of the stage lights onto both opponents on the arena floor. Another notable spot featured Martinez executing a release German suplex from the top rope to Storm, only to become entangled in the ropes herself and allow Shirai to hit her in the "tree of woe" position with a diving double foot stop. Shortly after hitting her Storm Zero finisher on Martinez for a nearfall, Storm (who seldom uses aerial maneuvers) followed with a top rope diving headbutt. As she went for the cover, Shirai hit her signature Over the Moon-sault on both opponents, pinning Martinez to win the match and retain the championship.

=== Main event ===
The main event for the NXT Championship between the champion Finn Bálor and challenger Pete Dunne followed, the first time the two had ever wrestled in any sort of match together, let alone one-on-one. Dunne repeatedly used joint manipulation on Bálor, splitting his fingers and bending his wrist in unnatural positions. He came close to winning the championship on multiple occasions, including executing his finisher, The Bitter End, for a nearfall. He attempted to use the move a second time, only for Bálor to reverse it into a version of his own 1916 finisher, also for a nearfall. At the finish, Bálor performed a Coup de Grâce and segued it into a standard version of the 1916 to earn the pinfall and retain the championship.

After the match, Dunne's stablemates (and NXT Tag Team Champions) Danny Burch and Oney Lorcan rushed the ring and assaulted Bálor, who had little capacity to fight back after a grueling championship bout. After a few moments, The Undisputed Era (represented by Adam Cole, Roderick Strong, and Bálor's recent rival Kyle O'Reilly) ran in to fend them off. As Cole and Strong stared Dunne, Burch, and Lorcan away from the ring, O'Reilly helped Bálor to his feet and it appeared the show would conclude with the four of them standing in the ring together. Cole then turned heel by executing a superkick on Bálor, the champion immediately falling to the mat. As O'Reilly began to protest, Cole superkicked him as well, leaving him prone as well, then left the ring. The show went off the air with Cole storming away from the ring and Strong standing in the ring next to the fallen Bálor and O'Reilly, looking back and forth between the two sides.

== Reception ==
Wrestling journalist Dave Meltzer of Wrestling Observer Newsletter was highly positive toward each of the event's matches, giving 4 stars to the women's tag team match, 4.75 stars to the NXT North American Championship match, 4.5 stars to the men's tag team match, 3.75 stars to the women's triple threat, and 4.5 stars to the main event. The event also received a 10.0 "Virtually Perfect" rating from Kevin Pantoja of 411Mania.

== Aftermath ==
Kyle O'Reilly opened the following episode of NXT, demanding an explanation from Adam Cole. Roderick Strong emerged, trying to play peacemaker, which O'Reilly didn't accept. Finn Bálor also appeared in this segment, blaming O'Reilly for Cole's attack on him. The three were forced into partnership in the night's main event against Pete Dunne, Danny Burch, and Oney Lorcan, a match they lost after further sneak attacks by Cole. The following week, Cole appeared to express remorse for his actions and a desire to reconcile with Strong, only to low blow him and rip Strong's Undisputed Era dog tags from his neck, cementing his heel turn and split from what remained of the group. For his match with Bálor on March 3, Strong made his ring entrance to different music and without any Undisputed Era logos or colors on his gear. For his own match with the NXT Champion the following week, Cole did enter to the familiar Undisputed Era theme and with Undisputed Era-tinged wrestling gear, having claimed that the group would only die when he said so and that by attacking O'Reilly and Strong he had merely cut dead weight. At the conclusion of the match, O'Reilly appeared and ripped Cole's Undisputed Era armband off. On March 24, during the contract signing for their unsanctioned match at TakeOver: Stand & Deliver, both men spoke of the group in the past tense, suggesting it had finally become defunct.

MSK and the team of Dakota Kai and Raquel González were presented with the trophy for winning their respective Dusty Rhodes Tag Team Classic tournaments later on February 17. It was originally announced that their respective tag team championship opportunities would both occur on March 3, though Wes Lee was later discovered to have sustained a legitimate broken hand at TakeOver, thus delaying MSK's title shot. WWE Women's Tag Team Champions (and NXT alumnae) Nia Jax and Shayna Baszler made an appearance in the segment, trading promos with their upcoming opponents. When the March 3 match ended in a controversial finish favoring Jax and Baszler, the NXT Women's Tag Team Championship was commissioned the week after, being first awarded to Kai and González by virtue of their Dusty Cup championship. However, afterwards, they were confronted by the runner-ups, Shotzi Blackheart and Ember Moon, setting up a title match between the two teams later that night, where Moon and Blackheart were victorious, ending Kai and González's reign at 56 minutes, the shortest reign in the title's history. MSK's title shot would later be rescheduled for Night 1 of TakeOver: Stand & Deliver.

Toni Storm was also shown to have disrupted a photo shoot for Io Shirai, attacking the NXT Women's Champion. The following week, she challenged Shirai to a one-on-one match for the championship after Shirai won her match, pointing out that Shirai did not defeat Storm herself at TakeOver and had in fact never done so. The match was made for March 10, where Shirai retained.

This was WWE's final event to livestream on the Indian version of the WWE Network before it merged under SonyLIV on February 21, which subsequently made it the final TakeOver and only Vengeance to air on the Indian WWE Network. Additionally, on January 25, 2021, WWE announced that the WWE Network would become exclusively distributed by Peacock in the United States as part of a new agreement with NBCUniversal, which at the time aired Monday Night Raw and NXT on the USA Network. On March 18, the WWE Network became a premium channel under Peacock, with premium subscribers to the service receiving access to the WWE Network at no additional cost. As a result, Vengeance Day was the final TakeOver, as well as the only Vengeance, to air on the American version of the WWE Network before it merged under Peacock. After a brief transitional period, the standalone version of the WWE Network in the U.S. shut down on April 4, with subsequent events available via Peacock's WWE channel and traditional PPV. This did not affect other countries at the time, which maintained the separate WWE Network service distributed by WWE.

In September 2021, NXT was rebranded as NXT 2.0, returning NXT to its original function as WWE's developmental brand. The NXT TakeOver series was subsequently discontinued. Vengeance Day continued on as its own event, however, with the 2022 event held as a special episode of NXT instead of airing on PPV or via livestreaming. The 2022 event in turn established Vengeance Day as NXT's annual Valentine's event. This was also the last Vengeance to air on PPV, as while the 2022 event was held as a television special, the 2023 event returned to livestreaming, although not PPV, as WWE ceased broadcasting NXT's events on traditional PPV after WarGames in December.

== Results ==
No.	Results	Stipulations	Times
1	Dakota Kai and Raquel González defeated Ember Moon and Shotzi Blackheart by pinfall	Women's Dusty Rhodes Tag Team Classic finals Winners also received a future WWE Women's Tag Team Championship match.	17:40
2	Johnny Gargano (c) defeated Kushida by pinfall	Singles match for the NXT North American Championship	24:51
3	MSK (Nash Carter and Wes Lee) defeated Grizzled Young Veterans (James Drake and Zack Gibson) by pinfall	Men's Dusty Rhodes Tag Team Classic finals Winners also received a future NXT Tag Team Championship match.	18:26
4	Io Shirai (c) defeated Mercedes Martinez and Toni Storm by pinfall	Triple threat match for the NXT Women's Championship	12:13
5	Finn Bálor (c) defeated Pete Dunne by pinfall	Singles match for the NXT Championship	25:24
(c) / – the champion(s) heading into the match

=== Dusty Rhodes Tag Team Classic bracket ===
==== Men's ====
First round NXT; January 13–20, 2021; 205 Live; January 13–20, 2021 (Aired: January 15–22)
The Undisputed Era (Adam Cole and Roderick Strong)	Pinfall
Breezango (Tyler Breeze and Fandango)	11:57
Tommaso Ciampa and Timothy Thatcher (Note: Tommaso Ciampa and Timothy Thatcher replaced Ashante "Thee" Adonis and Desmond Troy after they were both injured by Karrion Kross in kayfabe.)	Pinfall
Ariya Daivari and Tony Nese	8:16
Kushida and Leon Ruff	Pinfall
The Way (Johnny Gargano and Austin Theory)	14:46
Ever-Rise (Chase Parker and Matt Martel)	7:58
Grizzled Young Veterans (James Drake and Zack Gibson)	Pinfall
MSK (Nash Carter and Wes Lee)	Pinfall
Jake Atlas and Isaiah "Swerve" Scott	8:36
August Grey and Curt Stallion	10:01
Drake Maverick and Killian Dain	Pinfall
Lucha House Party (Note: Lucha House Party were guest participants.) (Gran Metalik and Lince Dorado)	Pinfall
Imperium (Fabian Aichner and Marcel Barthel)	9:54
The Bollywood Boyz (Samir Singh and Sunil Singh)	9:45
Legado Del Fantasma (Joaquin Wilde and Raul Mendoza)	Pinfall

Quarterfinals; NXT; January 27 – February 3, 2021
The Undisputed Era	17:05
Tommaso Ciampa and Timothy Thatcher	Pinfall
Kushida and Leon Ruff	9:51
Grizzled Young Veterans	Pinfall
MSK	Pinfall
Drake Maverick and Killian Dain	11:04
Lucha House Party	6:23
Legado Del Fantasma	Pinfall

Semifinals; NXT; February 10, 2021
Tommaso Ciampa and Timothy Thatcher	11:37
Grizzled Young Veterans	Pinfall
MSK	Pinfall
Legado Del Fantasma	9:34

Final; NXT TakeOver: Vengeance Day; February 14, 2021
Grizzled Young Veterans	18:26
MSK	Pinfall

==== Women's ====
First round NXT; January 20–27, 2021; 205 Live; January 20–27, 2021 (Aired: January 22–29)
Cora Jade and Gigi Dolin	5:56
The Way (Candice LeRae and Indi Hartwell)	Pinfall
Ember Moon and Shotzi Blackheart	Submission
Marina Shafir and Zoey Stark	7:52
Kacy Catanzaro and Kayden Carter	Pinfall
Mercedes Martinez and Toni Storm	9:27
Aliyah and Jessi Kamea	5:56
Dakota Kai and Raquel González	Pinfall

Semifinals; NXT; February 3–10, 2021
The Way	14:19
Ember Moon and Shotzi Blackheart	Pinfall
Kacy Catanzaro and Kayden Carter	13:01
Dakota Kai and Raquel González	Pinfall

Final; NXT TakeOver: Vengeance Day; February 14, 2021
Ember Moon and Shotzi Blackheart	17:40
Dakota Kai and Raquel González	Pinfall
