= Vengeance (2006) =

World Wrestling Entertainment pay-per-view event

- Promotional poster featuring Edge, John Cena, and D-Generation X logo
- Promotion: World Wrestling Entertainment
- Brand: Raw
- Date: June 25, 2006
- City: Charlotte, North Carolina
- Venue: Charlotte Bobcats Arena
- Attendance: 6,800
- Buy rate: 320,000

Pay-per-view chronology
← Previous; ECW One Night Stand	Next → The Great American Bash

Vengeance chronology
← Previous; 2005	Next → Vengeance: Night of Champions

The 2006 Vengeance was a professional wrestling pay-per-view (PPV) event produced by World Wrestling Entertainment (WWE). It was the sixth annual Vengeance and took place on June 25, 2006, at the Charlotte Bobcats Arena in Charlotte, North Carolina, held exclusively for wrestlers from the promotion's Raw brand division.

This was the last brand-exclusive Vengeance during the first brand split period (2002–2011), as following WrestleMania 23 in April 2007, brand-exclusive PPVs were discontinued. There would not be another brand-exclusive Vengeance event until 2021 during the second brand split period that began in 2016, with Vengeance—renamed as Vengeance Day—becoming an exclusive annual event for WWE's developmental brand, NXT.

Eight professional wrestling matches were featured on the event's card. The card featured eight televised matches, including two main events which resulted in Rob Van Dam defeating Edge to retain the WWE Championship and D-Generation X (Triple H and Shawn Michaels) defeating Spirit Squad (Kenny, Johnny, Mitch, Nicky, and Mikey) in a 5-on-2 handicap match. One bout was featured on the undercard, in which John Cena defeated Sabu in an Extreme Rules lumberjack match, which featured superstars from the Raw and ECW brands at ringside.

Vengeance grossed over US$400,000 in ticket sales from an attendance of 6,800 and received 320,000 pay-per-view buys, which helped WWE increase its pay-per-view revenue by $21.6 million compared to the previous year. When the event was released on DVD, it reached the number one position on Billboard's DVD Sales Chart. The professional wrestling section of the Canadian Online Explorer website rated the entire event a 6.5 out of 10 stars, higher than the 2005 event rating of 6 out of 10.

== Production ==
=== Background ===
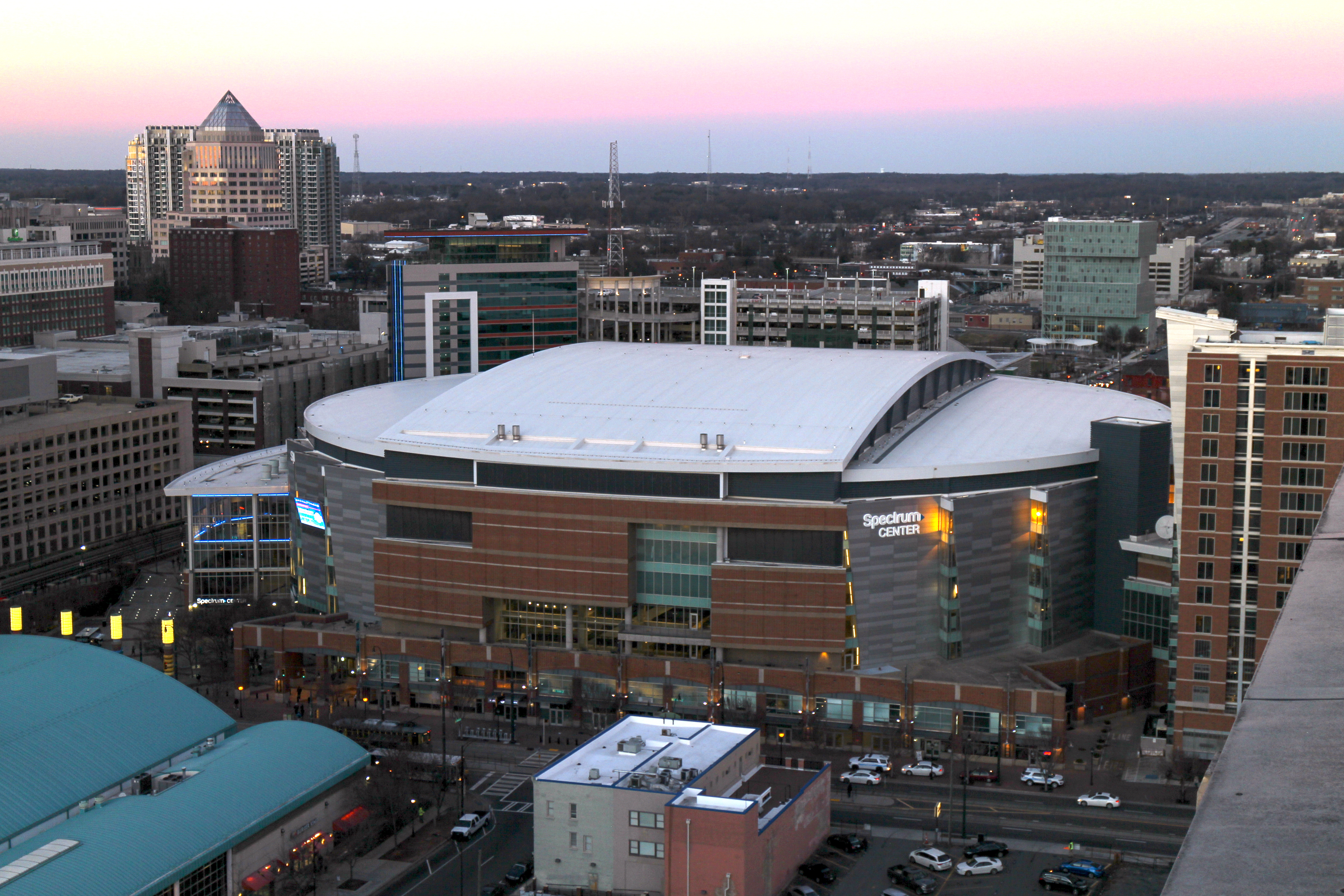
The sixth annual Vengeance was held at the Charlotte Bobcats Arena in Charlotte, North Carolina.

Vengeance was an annual professional wrestling pay-per-view (PPV) event produced by World Wrestling Entertainment (WWE) since 2001. The first event was held in December but then became the annual July PPV in 2002, before moving up to June in 2005. The sixth event was held on June 25, 2006, at the Charlotte Bobcats Arena in Charlotte, North Carolina. Like the previous two years's events, the 2006 event was held exclusively for wrestlers from the Raw brand.

=== Storylines ===
The event featured eight professional wrestling matches with different wrestlers involved in pre-existing scripted feuds, plots and storylines. All wrestlers belonged to the Raw brand – a storyline division in which WWE assigned its employees to a different program, the other two being SmackDown! and ECW.

The main rivalry heading into Vengeance was between WWE Champion and ECW World Heavyweight Champion Rob Van Dam who was defending the WWE Championship against Edge in a singles match. The buildup to the match began on the television premiere of ECW on Sci Fi, in which Van Dam was awarded the ECW World Heavyweight Championship (which later become simply known as ECW World Championship) by Paul Heyman, thus making Van Dam a double champion, by holding both the ECW and WWE Championships. Van Dam's celebration was then interrupted by Edge and his girlfriend Lita. Edge, who was the number one contender for the title, informed Van Dam that they both had a lot in common, referring to them being both Money in the Bank winners and successfully becoming WWE Champions. Edge concluded with giving Van Dam some kind words, in which afterwards he performed a Spear on Van Dam. On the June 19 episode of Raw, in retaliation Van Dam attacked Edge, moments after winning a match against Ric Flair. On the June 20 episode of ECW, Van Dam and Kurt Angle defeated Edge and Randy Orton in a tag team match when Van Dam pinned Edge after a Five Star Frog Splash.

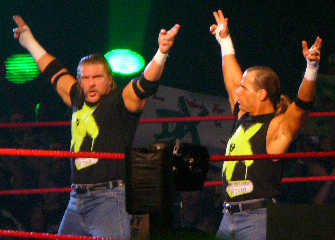
D-Generation X (Triple H and Shawn Michaels) who faced off against the Spirit Squad at Vengeance

Another predominant rivalry scripted into Vengeance was between D-Generation X (DX) Triple H and Shawn Michaels versus the Spirit Squad (Kenny, Johnny, Mitch, Nicky, and Mikey) in a 5-on-2 Handicap match consisting of one team of wrestlers facing off against a team of wrestlers with numerical superiority such as five against two. The buildup to the match began after Backlash, Raw's previous pay-per-view event, where The McMahons (Vince and Shane) defeated Michaels and "God" in a tag team match, with help from the Spirit Squad in a No Holds Barred match. Throughout the weeks on Raw, Michaels got revenge on both Vince McMahon and the Spirit Squad, until the May 22 episode of Raw, where the Spirit Squad were scripted to injure Michaels' left knee. Then, by orders of McMahon, Triple H was to "break Michaels' skull", with a sledgehammer. Triple H failed to do what McMahon ordered and instead attacked the Spirit Squad, thus turning into a fan favorite. Two weeks later, McMahon booked Triple H in a gauntlet match, consisting of two wrestlers beginning the match, and replacing whenever one is eliminated, with the last person standing being named the winner, against the Spirit Squad. In the match, Kenny grabbed a steel chair and inserted the chair on Triple H's left knee, similar to what the group did to Michaels. Mitch, who was the only member not participating in the match, was thrown out from the backstage curtain by Michaels. Following this, he joined Triple H in the ring as they began to beat down the four members of the group. This saw Michaels and Triple H reform DX since their teased reunion in 2002. That same night, McMahon scheduled the Spirit Squad and DX in a 5-on-2 handicap tag team match. On the June 19 episode of Raw, DX marked their return, when the duo humiliated the Spirit Squad as DX dumped green slime onto the group and embarrassed the team afterwards, by beating them.

One of the featured matches was between John Cena versus Sabu in an Extreme Rules lumberjack match, a standard match with the exception that the ring is surrounded by a group of wrestlers not directly involved in it and competed under hardcore rules. On the television debut of ECW on Sci Fi on June 13, a brawl broke out between Rob Van Dam and Edge. Edge, who stormed through the ECW crowd, was attacked by Cena, who cost Cena the WWE Championship at ECW's One Night Stand, and written into the storyline, sought revenge against Edge. Following the attack, Cena went to ringside where he knocked ECW Representative Paul Heyman unconscious, after Heyman awarded the pinfall win to Van Dam at One Night Stand. Following the attack, Heyman announced that all ECW superstars would be at Raw the following week. The following week on Raw, Heyman appeared alongside ECW superstar, Balls Mahoney, who was booked to face Cena in a singles match. The match was won by Cena after he made Mahoney submit. After the match, Cena was attacked by ECW superstar Sabu, who, on the premiere of ECW on Sci Fi, won a 10-man Extreme Battle Royal, and earned the right to face Cena at Vengeance in a singles match. Sabu assaulted Cena in which he performed a leg drop on Cena, diving onto him and putting Cena through the Raw announcers' table. The following night on an episode of ECW on Sci Fi, Cena showed up in the ECW locker room, where he challenged Sabu to an Extreme lumberjack match, for which Sabu accepted.

== Event ==
Other on-screen personnel
Role:	Name:
English commentators	Jim Ross
English commentators	Jerry Lawler
Spanish commentators	Carlos Cabrera
Spanish commentators	Hugo Savinovich
Interviewers	Todd Grisham
Interviewers	Maria Kanellis
Ring announcer	Lilian Garcia
Referees	Mike Chioda
Referees	Jack Doan
Referees	Chad Patton
Referees	Mickie Henson
Referees	Steve Keirn

Before the event went live on pay-per-view, Val Venis defeated Rob Conway in a dark match.

=== Preliminary matches ===
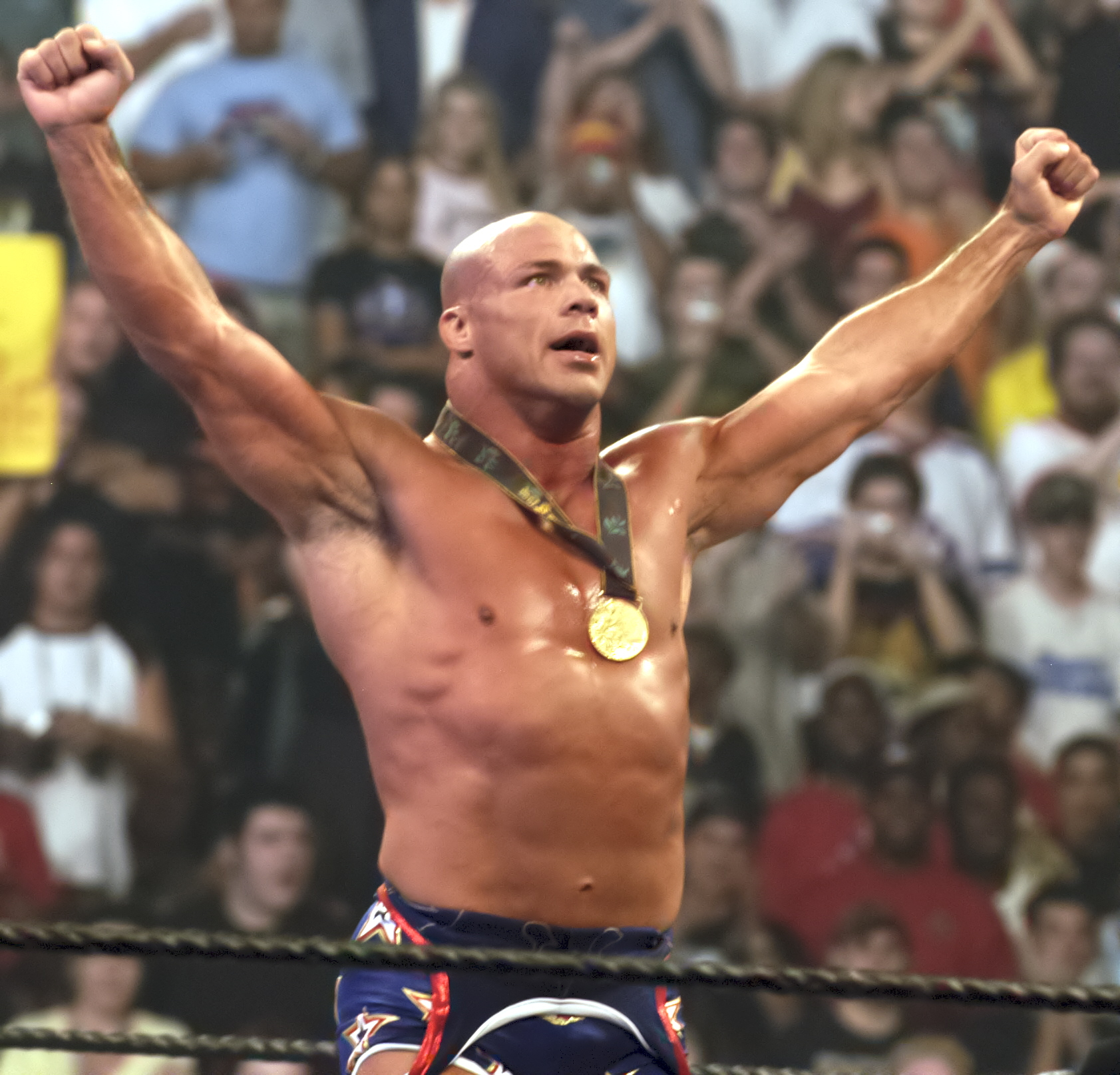
Kurt Angle faced Randy Orton at Vengeance

In the first televised match, Randy Orton faced Kurt Angle. In the early stages both superstars took the advantage over one another. Angle controlled most of the match, as Orton tried to avoid Angle's assaults. Angle tried to perform a suplex on Orton off the ring apron, but did not perform the move. This was followed by Angle performing a belly to back suplex on Orton on the outside ring floor. Mid-way in the match, Orton attempted to perform an RKO, but he countered by pushing Orton to the turnbuckle. Orton took the padding off the turnbuckle, leaving it exposed. Following this, Angle began performing a series of German suplexes on Orton. Angle then applied the ankle lock hold. Orton, however, flipped over and sent Angle face-first into the exposed turnbuckle. As he turned around, Orton performed the RKO, and covered Angle to gain the pinfall victory.

The next match was between Umaga and Eugene. Before the match got underway, Eugene invited Jim Duggan, Doink the Clown, and Kamala down to ringside. The match concluded with Umaga performing the Samoan Spike to the throat of Eugene. Umaga pinned Eugene to win the match. After the match, Umaga attacked Jim Duggan and Doink the Clown.

In the next match, Mick Foley faced Ric Flair in a 2-Out-of-3 Falls Match. Foley gained the advantage after he executed a Double Underhook DDT. Foley then began to taunt Flair and took out Mr. Socko, a dirty sock puppet, dressed like Flair. Foley controlled most of the match, until he attempted to apply the Figure-Four Leglock, but Flair countered with an inside cradle over Foley to win the first fall. Frustrated, Foley grabbed a trash can from under the ring and brought it to the ring to hit Flair with it. Flair avoided the attack, as he tripped Foley to apply the Figure-Four Leglock. At the end, Foley got disqualified when he hit Flair with the trash can. The referee awarded Flair the win. After the match, Foley attacked Flair with a barb-wired bat, leaving Flair busted open.

The fourth match was a triple threat match, for the WWE Intercontinental Championship, in which champion Shelton Benjamin defended the title against Carlito and Johnny Nitro. The match began with Carlito performing a springboard moonsault from the ring apron hitting both Nitro and Benjamin in the process. A spot in the match saw Carlito set up Nitro in a Tree of Woe. Carlito stood on the turnbuckle, in which Benjamin followed by jumping up with Carlito. Nitro then hit Benjamin with a powerbomb, while Benjamin dropped Carlito, making both men hit the mat. Later in the match, Carlito performed a backcracker on Benjamin. Nitro, who was thrown out of the ring, returned and removed Carlito from making the cover on Benjamin. He instead covered Benjamin for the pinfall victory, thus becoming the new Intercontinental champion.

=== Main event matches ===
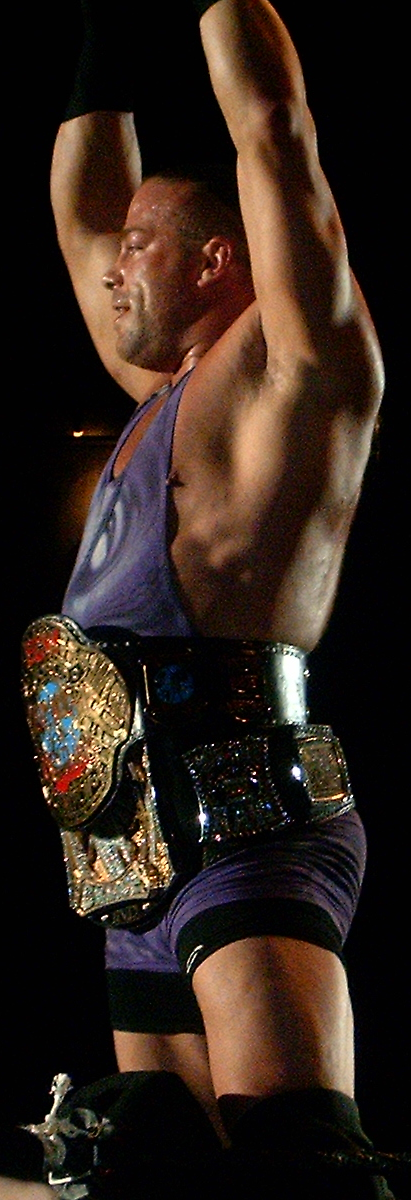
Rob Van Dam defended the WWE Championship against Edge (the ECW World Championship was not on the line)

The first main match was for the WWE Championship, in which champion Rob Van Dam defended the title against Edge accompanied with Lita. In the beginning of the match, Edge performed a sunset flip powerbomb on Van Dam outside the ring. Van Dam, however, managed to execute a crossbody on Edge inside the ring, resulting in the two landing on the outside of the ring floor. Both men took the upper hand in the match, until Van Dam was scripted to knock the referee unconscious. Edge took advantage, as Lita gave him the title. Edge tried to hit Van Dam with the title, but Van Dam dodged the hit as he performed a spinning kick on the title, which hit Edge's face. Edge, however, got the advantage as he attempted to perform a shoulder block takedown on Van Dam, while Lita propped a chair on a ring corner. Edge went for the shoulder block takedown, but Van Dam moved out of the way, resulting in Edge to crash head-first onto the chair. Capitalizing on the situation, Van Dam then performed a Five Star Frog Splash from the top turnbuckle on Edge, which he followed with a cover and a pinfall, thus retaining the WWE Championship.

The sixth match was a singles match between Kane versus Impostor Kane. The match began with Impostor Kane executing a sidewalk slam on Kane. The Impostor tried to chokeslam Kane, but Kane countered with a DDT. The match concluded with Impostor Kane performing a chokeslam on Kane and pinning him for the pinfall victory.

The seventh match was the Extreme Lumberjack match between Sabu and John Cena. Before the match began, the ECW and Raw superstars made their way to ringside to take their place as lumberjacks. The match quickly began with Cena throwing Sabu out of the ring onto the Raw lumberjacks, in which they assaulted Sabu and threw him back in the ring. Sabu would later get the upper hand and throw Cena out onto the ECW lumberjacks, at ringside. Throughout the match, Sabu took the advantage over Cena as he performed a somersault leg drop, driving a steel chair onto Cena's face. Cena got the upper hand when he was able to counter a flying crossbody attempt by Sabu. Mid-way in the match, the ECW and Raw lumberjacks started brawling at ringside. At ringside, the ECW lumberjacks began their assault on Cena, after he was hit with a steel chair by Sabu. They laid his head on a table, in which Sabu attempted to perform a high-flying maneuver. The Raw superstars, however, gave Cena the upper hand to hit Sabu with a kendo stick in mid-air. Back in the ring, Cena hit Sabu with a steel chair then lifted him over his shoulders and threw him down on a table that was at ringside to execute the FU. Following this, Sabu was thrown back into the ring where Cena applied the STFU in which Sabu submitted to and giving Cena the win.

The last match on the card was the five-on-two handicap match between D-Generation X (Shawn Michaels and Triple H) (DX) versus the Spirit Squad (Johnny, Kenny, Mikey, Mitch, and Nicky). During the beginning of the match, Michaels quickly took control of Mitch, before tagging in Triple H. Johnny was tagged in the match, after encouragement from his team, to face off against Triple H. The match was then controlled by the Spirit Squad, after Johnny performed an enzuigiri on Michaels. Nicky, who was tagged in, distracted the referee, allowing the other squad members to pull Michaels out of the ring and hit Michaels with a steel chair. Back in the ring, the assault continued, as each member took the upper hand over him. Michaels came back after countering a double team maneuver and hitting both Nicky and Mikey with a double DDT. Michaels then tagged Triple H into the match. The match concluded with Triple H performing a Pedigree and Michaels performed Sweet Chin Music. Both Triple H and Michaels got the pinfall victory respectively over the Spirit Squad. After the match, the three remaining members tried to attack DX, but were unsuccessful in doing so.

== Reception ==
The Charlotte Bobcats Arena usually can accommodate 20,000, but the capacity was reduced for the event. This event grossed over $400,000 from an approximate attendance of 6,800 – the maximum allowed. It also received 320,000 pay-per-view buys. Vengeance helped WWE earn $21.6 million in revenue from pay-per-view events versus $19.9 million the previous year, which was later confirmed by Linda McMahon, the CEO of WWE, on August 31, 2006, in a quarterly result. The event received positive reviews. Canadian Online Explorer's professional wrestling section rated the event 6.5 out of 10. The rating was higher than the Vengeance 2005 event which was rated 6 out 10. The WWE title, Intercontinental title, and 5-on-2 handicap match were all rated an 8 out of 10. Additionally, the singles match between Kane and Impostor Kane was rated a 3 out of 10.

The event was released on DVD on July 25, 2006. The DVD was distributed by the label Sony Music Entertainment. The DVD ranked number one on Billboard's DVD Sales Chart for recreational sports during the week of August 19, 2006, although falling thereafter. It remained in the chart for three months, until the week of November 4, 2006, when it ranked 17th.

== Aftermath ==
On the July 3 episode of Raw, a triple threat match was booked between Rob Van Dam, Edge, and John Cena for the WWE Championship, after Van Dam made the stipulation. Edge defeated both Van Dam and Cena to become the new WWE Champion, after pinning Van Dam. The following night on ECW on Sci Fi, Van Dam lost the ECW World Championship to Big Show, after Big Show received assistance from Paul Heyman, who declined to make the three-count for Van Dam, but instead gave the pinfall to Big Show. Later on WWE's official website, it was announced that Heyman suspended Van Dam for 30 days without giving a reason. This angle was written after WWE suspended Van Dam for his recent drug possession arrest.

The following month at Saturday Night's Main Event XXXIII, a WWE Championship match was scheduled between Edge and Cena. Cena won the match by disqualification, after Lita interfered on behalf of Edge. A singles match was booked between Edge and Cena for the WWE Championship at SummerSlam, with the stipulation that if Edge disqualified himself, he would have lost the WWE Championship. At SummerSlam, Edge retained the title after he hit Cena with a pair of brass knuckles, this occurred when the referee was not looking.

In a July Saturday Night's Main Event XXXIII, DX defeated the Spirit Squad in a 5-on-2 elimination match. The McMahons (Vince and Shane) continued their feud with DX, as they became frustrated with DX's antics. McMahon scheduled a tag team match, where he would team up with Shane to take on DX at SummerSlam in August. Before the match got underway at SummerSlam, the Spirit Squad, Mr. Kennedy, William Regal, Finlay, and The Big Show all interfered on behalf of the McMahons. DX, however, won the match.

The 2006 Vengeance was the last in a three-year stretch of being a Raw-exclusive PPV, as following WrestleMania 23 in April 2007, brand-exclusive PPVs were discontinued. It would also be the final PPV to be promoted solely as Vengeance until the 2011 event, as the 2007 event was a joint PPV titled Vengeance: Night of Champions, which was both the final Vengeance event until 2011 and the inaugural Night of Champions event. It was also the final brand-exclusive Vengeance until the 2021 event, which was held exclusively for the NXT brand. Vengeance would return to the now-renamed Spectrum Center as Vengeance Day event on February 4, 2023.

== Results ==
No.	Results	Stipulations	Times
1^{D}	Val Venis defeated Rob Conway	Singles match	—
2	Randy Orton defeated Kurt Angle	Singles match	12:50
3	Umaga (with Armando Estrada) defeated Eugene (with Jim Duggan, Doink the Clown and Kamala)	Singles match	1:42
4	Ric Flair defeated Mick Foley 2-0	Two-out-of-three falls match	7:00
5	Johnny Nitro (with Melina) defeated Shelton Benjamin (c) and Carlito	Triple threat match for the WWE Intercontinental Championship	12:01
6	Rob Van Dam (c) defeated Edge (with Lita)	Singles match for the WWE Championship	17:55
7	Imposter Kane defeated Kane	Singles match	7:00
8	John Cena defeated Sabu by submission	Extreme Lumberjack match (Note: The lumberjacks were: Al Snow, Balls Mahoney, Charlie Haas, Justin Credible, Lance Cade, Little Guido Maritato, Matt Striker, Roadkill, Rob Conway, The Sandman, Snitsky, Stevie Richards, Trevor Murdoch, Tommy Dreamer, Val Venis and Viscera.)	6:38
9	D-Generation X (Shawn Michaels and Triple H) defeated The Spirit Squad (Kenny, Johnny, Mitch, Nicky, and Mikey)	Handicap match	17:45
(c) / – the champion(s) heading into the match; D / – this was a dark match
