= Dusty Rhodes Tag Team Classic =

Professional wrestling tag team tournament in WWE

- The tournament's official logos, as of 2022
- Created by: Triple H Vince McMahon
- Promotion(s): WWE; Lucha Libre AAA Worldwide
- Brand(s): Raw; SmackDown; NXT; Evolve
- First event: 2015

Men's
- Established: 2015; 11 years ago
- Current winner: Noam Dar and Romeo Moreno
- Last completed: 2026
- Editions: 9
- Format: Single-elimination tournament
- Participants: 14 tag teams
Statistics
- First winner: Finn Bálor and Samoa Joe
- Oldest winner: Baron Corbin (39 years, 144 days)
- Youngest winner: Rezar (22 years, 156 days)
- Heaviest winner: The Authors of Pain (Akam and Rezar) (620 lb (280 kg))
- Lightest winner: 354 lb (161 kg): MSK (Nash Carter and Wes Lee); Noam Dar and Romeo Moreno

Women's
- Established: 2021; 5 years ago
- Defunct: 2022
- Final winner: Kay Lee Ray and Io Shirai
- Editions: 2
- Format: Single-elimination tournament
- Participants: 8 tag teams
Statistics
- First winner: Dakota Kai and Raquel González
- Oldest winner: Dakota Kai (32 years, 284 days)
- Youngest winner: Kay Lee Ray (29 years, 223 days)
- Heaviest winner: Dakota Kai and Raquel González; 296 lb (134 kg)
- Lightest winner: Kay Lee Ray and Io Shirai; 231 lb (105 kg)

The Dusty Rhodes Tag Team Classic is an annual professional wrestling tag team tournament held by the American professional wrestling promotion WWE, and is featured on its NXT brand, having first been established in 2015. In subsequent years, wrestlers from the NXT UK and 205 Live brands—both of which were subsidiary/sister brands under the NXT banner—have also been included. While originally just for men, a women's version of the tournament was introduced in 2021 and runs concurrently with the men's tournament. The tournament was established following the death of WWE Hall of Fame wrestler Dusty Rhodes, who was the creator of and star in the Crockett Cup tournaments in the National Wrestling Alliance (NWA) during the mid-late 1980s, which the Dusty Classic is modeled after and has been compared to.

== History ==
The original 16-team single elimination tournament was established in August 2015 as a tribute to Dusty Rhodes—who had been serving as a senior producer and trainer in NXT—and was formally announced during NXT TakeOver: Brooklyn, which took place shortly after he had died. That year's Classic featured tournament matches taking place all through September both on NXT's weekly TV show and at NXT house shows, and culminated in October at NXT TakeOver: Respect, with the team of Finn Bálor and Samoa Joe winning, having defeated Baron Corbin and Rhyno in the final.

The second Classic took place throughout the fall of 2016—again with a 16-team field—which eventually culminating in November at NXT TakeOver: Toronto, where it was won by The Authors of Pain, having defeated TM-61. There was no tournament held in 2017 after taking an extra half year to switch to a winter/early spring schedule, returning in 2018. Now featuring an eight-team field, the 2018 Classic culminated at NXT TakeOver: New Orleans, the night before WrestleMania 34. It was won by Adam Cole and Kyle O'Reilly of The Undisputed Era, who successfully defended their NXT Tag Team Championship in a Winners Take All Triple Threat match against both tournament finalists, The Authors of Pain and Roderick Strong and Pete Dunne.

The fourth Classic was held in February and March 2019. Aleister Black and Ricochet won the eight-team tournament, ultimately defeating The Forgotten Sons (Wesley Blake and Steve Cutler) in the final on March 13 during the NXT tapings. The fifth Classic was announced during the January 1, 2020 episode of NXT. Again featuring an eight-team field, for the first time the tournament included teams from sister brand NXT UK, with both brands having four teams each in the tournament. All four first-round matches featured direct NXT vs. NXT UK matchups, and the semifinals and final also wound up featuring NXT teams vs. NXT UK teams. The BroserWeights (Matt Riddle and Pete Dunne) representing NXT won the tournament, defeating NXT UK's Grizzled Young Veterans (Zack Gibson and James Drake) on the live January 29, 2020 episode of NXT in the final.

The sixth Classic was announced during the December 30, 2020 episode of NXT, and began on January 13, 2021. In 2021, the field increased back to its original format of 16 teams. In addition, teams from 205 Live—which like NXT UK is a subsidiary/sister brand under the NXT banner—would also participate in the tournament (with some matches taking place on 205 Live), as well as NXT alumni the Lucha House Party (now members of the Raw brand), who were invited as guest entrants. Also in 2021, the first women's version of the tournament was announced on January 6, and began on January 20, with matches taking place on both NXT and 205 Live, which also marked the first women's matches to be held on 205 Live.

The seventh Classic was announced during the January 4, 2022 on New Year's Evil. The eight-team men's tournament began on January 18, while the women's tournament began on February 22.

The eighth Classic was announced during the October 10, 2023 episode of NXT by Cody Rhodes who serves as special guest General Manager for the night. The men's tournament began on the January 9, 2024 episode of NXT.

The ninth Classic was announced during the September 15, 2026 episode of NXT, and will begin on September 22, 2026. It will feature 14 teams from WWE's Raw, SmackDown, NXT, and Evolve brands, as well as their sister promotion Lucha Libre AAA Worldwide (AAA).

== Prize ==
The winners of the tournament have their names inscribed on the Dusty Rhodes Tag Team Classic Trophy (commonly referred to as the "Dusty Cup"), which is modeled in part after Rhodes' signature "cowboy" style wrestling boots. Since 2018, the winners of the men's tournament also receive a future NXT Tag Team Championship match. Similarly, the winners of the women's tournament — established in 2021 — also receive a future tag team championship match. The winner's of the inaugural women's tournament had received a match for the WWE Women's Tag Team Championship, but after a controversial finish during the title match, the tournament winners were awarded the inaugural NXT Women's Tag Team Championship, with future winners receiving a match for the titles. In 2022, Women's Dusty Cup winners Io Shirai and Kay Lee Ray had earned a match for the NXT Women's Tag Team Championship, but instead opted to add themselves to the NXT Women's Championship match between champion Mandy Rose and Cora Jade at Stand & Deliver to make it a fatal four-way match.

== List of winners ==
Tournament summary
No.	Winners	Finals			
No.	Winners	Event	Date	Venue	City
1	Finn Bálor and Samoa Joe	NXT TakeOver: Respect	October 7, 2015	Full Sail University	Winter Park, FL
2	The Authors of Pain (Note: The manager of the Authors of Pain Paul Ellering was suspended in a shark cage above the ring during the tournament final.) (Akam and Rezar)	NXT TakeOver: Toronto	November 19, 2016	Air Canada Centre	Toronto, Ontario, Canada
3	The Undisputed Era (Note: Although The Undisputed Era were not official participants in the tournament, they were added to the final after causing a double disqualification in the original final. The Undisputed Era defended the NXT Tag Team Championship in the final.) (Adam Cole and Kyle O'Reilly)	NXT TakeOver: New Orleans	April 7, 2018	Smoothie King Center	New Orleans, LA
4	Aleister Black and Ricochet	NXT	March 13, 2019	Full Sail University	Winter Park, FL
5	The Broserweights (Matt Riddle and Pete Dunne)	NXT	January 29, 2020	Full Sail University	Winter Park, FL
6	MSK (Nash Carter and Wes Lee)	NXT TakeOver: Vengeance Day	February 14, 2021	WWE Performance Center	Orlando, FL
7	Dakota Kai and Raquel González	NXT TakeOver: Vengeance Day	February 14, 2021	WWE Performance Center	Orlando, FL
8	The Creed Brothers (Brutus Creed and Julius Creed)	Vengeance Day	February 15, 2022	WWE Performance Center	Orlando, FL
9	Kay Lee Ray and Io Shirai	NXT	March 22, 2022	WWE Performance Center	Orlando, FL
10	Baron Corbin and Bron Breakker	Vengeance Day	February 4, 2024	F&M Bank Arena	Clarksville, TN
11	Noam Dar and Romeo Moreno	NXT	November 4, 2026	WWE Performance Center	Orlando, FL

=== Championship opportunity ===
==== Men's ====
Starting with the 2019 edition, every tournament winner has earned a future NXT Tag Team Championship match.

– Victory
– Loss

No.	Winners	Event	Date	Result
1	Aleister Black and Ricochet	NXT TakeOver: New York	April 5, 2019	Lost to The War Raiders (Hanson and Ivar).
2	The Broserweights (Matt Riddle and Pete Dunne)	NXT TakeOver: Portland	February 16, 2020	Defeated The Undisputed Era (Bobby Fish and Kyle O'Reilly).
3	MSK (Nash Carter and Wes Lee)	NXT TakeOver: Stand & Deliver; Night 1	April 7, 2021	Defeated the Grizzled Young Veterans (James Drake and Zack Gibson) and Legado del Fantasma (Joaquin Wilde and Raul Mendoza) in a triple threat tag team match for the vacant NXT Tag Team Championship.
4	The Creed Brothers (Brutus Creed and Julius Creed)	Stand & Deliver	April 2, 2022	Lost to new champions MSK (Nash Carter and Wes Lee) in a triple threat tag team match that also involved defending champions Imperium (Fabian Aichner and Marcel Barthel).
5	Baron Corbin and Bron Breakker	NXT	February 13, 2024	Defeated The Family (Channing "Stacks" Lorenzo and Tony D'Angelo).
6	Noam Dar and Romeo Moreno	TBA	TBA	Dar and Moreno were supposed to challenge The Vanity Project (Brad Baylor and Ricky Smokes) on the November 10, 2026, episode of NXT but were attacked backstage by the Vanity Project and ruled out of the match. Tournament runners-up Hank & Tank (Hank Walker and Tank Ledger) received the title match instead. It is currently not known whether Dar and Moreno will receive a future title match.

==== Women's ====
Every tournament winner has earned a future title match either for the WWE Women's Tag Team Championship or NXT Women's Tag Team Championship.

– Victory
– Loss

No.	Winners	Championship match			
No.	Winners	Championship	Event	Date	Result
1	Dakota Kai and Raquel González	WWE Women's Tag Team Championship	NXT	March 3, 2021	Lost to Nia Jax and Shayna Baszler. Kai controversially submitted to Baszler after a new referee was sent in by WWE official Adam Pearce despite Kai not being the legal competitor. The following week, NXT General Manager William Regal awarded the NXT Women's Tag Team Championship to Kai and González.
2	Kay Lee Ray and Io Shirai	NXT Women's Championship	Stand & Deliver	April 2, 2022	Both lost to defending champion Mandy Rose in a fatal four-way match that also involved Cora Jade.

== Editions ==
=== 2015 tournament ===
The inaugural edition of the Dusty Rhodes Tag Team Classic began on the August 13, 2015 taping of NXT and culminated at NXT TakeOver: Respect on October 7, 2015. This single-elimination tournament consisted of 16 tag teams. In the tournament final, Finn Bálor and Samoa Joe defeated Baron Corbin and Rhyno to become the inaugural winners.

=== 2016 tournament ===
The second edition of the Dusty Rhodes Tag Team Classic began on the October 5, 2016, episode of NXT and culminated at NXT TakeOver: Toronto on November 19, 2016. This single-elimination tournament consisted of 16 tag teams. In the tournament final, The Authors of Pain (Akam and Rezar) defeated TM-61 (Nick Miller and Shane Thorne).

=== 2018 tournament ===
The third edition of the Dusty Rhodes Tag Team Classic began on the March 7, 2018, episode of NXT and culminated at NXT TakeOver: New Orleans on April 7, 2018. This single-elimination tournament consisted of eight tag teams. In the tournament final, The Undisputed Era (Adam Cole and Kyle O'Reilly) retained the NXT Tag Team Championship in a Winner Takes All triple threat tag team match against The Authors of Pain (Akam and Rezar) and the team of Pete Dunne and Roderick Strong.

=== 2019 tournament ===
The fourth edition of the Dusty Rhodes Tag Team Classic began on the March 6, 2019, episode of NXT and culminated on the March 27 episode. This single-elimination tournament consisted of eight tag teams. In the tournament final, Aleister Black and Ricochet defeated The Forgotten Sons (Steve Cutler and Wesley Blake).

2019 Dusty Rhodes Tag Team Classic bracket

First round NXT; February 20, 2019 (Aired: March 6)
Moustache Mountain (Trent Seven and Tyler Bate)	Pinfall
Street Profits (Angelo Dawkins and Montez Ford)	7:22
Oney Lorcan and Danny Burch	8:23
The Forgotten Sons (Steve Cutler and Wesley Blake)	Pinfall
#DIY (Tommaso Ciampa and Johnny Gargano)	Pinfall
The Undisputed Era (Kyle O'Reilly and Bobby Fish)	14:01
Aleister Black and Ricochet	Pinfall
Fabian Aichner and Marcel Barthel	8:17

Semifinals; NXT; February 20, 2019 (Aired: March 13)
Moustache Mountain	9:38
The Forgotten Sons	Pinfall
#DIY	13:27
Aleister Black and Ricochet	Pinfall

Final; NXT; March 13, 2019 (Aired: March 27)
The Forgotten Sons	14:24
Aleister Black and Ricochet	Pinfall

=== 2020 tournament ===
The fifth edition of the Dusty Rhodes Tag Team Classic began on the January 8, 2020, episode of NXT and culminated on the January 29 episode. This single-elimination tournament consisted of eight tag teams, equally split between NXT and NXT UK. In the first round, each match featured a tag team from NXT facing against a tag team from NXT UK. In the tournament final, NXT's The BroserWeights (Matt Riddle and Pete Dunne) defeated NXT UK's Grizzled Young Veterans (James Drake and Zack Gibson).

2020 Dusty Rhodes Tag Team Classic bracket

First round NXT; January 8–15, 2020
NXT UK	Imperium (Fabian Aichner and Marcel Barthel)	Pinfall
NXT	The Forgotten Sons (Steve Cutler and Wesley Blake)	5:08
NXT	The BroserWeights (Matt Riddle and Pete Dunne)	Pinfall
NXT UK	Mark Andrews and Flash Morgan Webster	18:20
NXT UK	Grizzled Young Veterans (James Drake and Zack Gibson)	Pinfall
NXT	Time Splitters (Kushida and Alex Shelley)	12:00
NXT UK	Gallus (Mark Coffey and Wolfgang)	8:51
NXT	The Undisputed Era (Bobby Fish and Kyle O'Reilly)	Pinfall

Semifinals; NXT; January 22, 2020
NXT UK	Imperium	11:23
NXT	The BroserWeights	Pinfall
NXT UK	Grizzled Young Veterans	Pinfall
NXT	The Undisputed Era	13:00

Final; NXT; January 29, 2020
NXT	The BroserWeights	Pinfall
NXT UK	Grizzled Young Veterans	17:39

=== 2021 tournaments ===
==== Men's ====
The sixth edition of the Men's Dusty Rhodes Tag Team Classic began on the January 13, 2021, episode of NXT and culminated at NXT TakeOver: Vengeance Day on February 14, 2021. This single-elimination tournament consisted of 16 tag teams. In the tournament final, MSK (Nash Carter and Wes Lee) defeated Grizzled Young Veterans (James Drake and Zack Gibson).

==== Women's ====
The inaugural Women's Dusty Rhodes Tag Team Classic began on the January 20, 2021, episode of NXT and culminated at NXT TakeOver: Vengeance Day on February 14, 2021. This single-elimination tournament consisted of eight tag teams. In the tournament final, Dakota Kai and Raquel González defeated Ember Moon and Shotzi Blackheart.

=== 2022 tournaments ===
==== Men's ====
The seventh edition of the Men's Dusty Rhodes Tag Team Classic began on the January 18, 2022, episode of NXT and culminated at Vengeance Day on February 15, 2022. This single-elimination tournament consisted of 8 tag teams. In the tournament final, The Creed Brothers (Brutus Creed and Julius Creed) defeated MSK (Wes Lee and Nash Carter).

==== Women's ====
The second edition of the Women's Dusty Rhodes Tag Team Classic began on the February 22, 2022, episode of NXT and culminated on the March 22 episode. This single-elimination tournament consisted of eight tag teams. In the tournament final, Io Shirai and Kay Lee Ray defeated Wendy Choo and Dakota Kai.

2022 Women's Dusty Rhodes Tag Team Classic bracket

First round NXT; February 22 – March 1, 2022
Io Shirai and Kay Lee Ray	Pinfall
Amari Miller and Lash Legend	2:44
Diamond Mine (Ivy Nile and Tatum Paxley)	3:26
Kacy Catanzaro and Kayden Carter	Pinfall
Indi Hartwell and Persia Pirotta	5:21
Wendy Choo and Dakota Kai	Pinfall
Cora Jade and Raquel González	Pinfall
Valentina Feroz and Yulisa León	4:47

Semifinals; NXT Roadblock; March 8, 2022
Io Shirai and Kay Lee Ray	Pinfall
Kacy Catanzaro and Kayden Carter	7:59
Wendy Choo and Dakota Kai	Pinfall
Cora Jade and Raquel González	10:42

Final; NXT; March 22, 2020
Io Shirai and Kay Lee Ray	Pinfall
Wendy Choo and Dakota Kai	10:22

=== 2024 tournament ===
The 2024 edition of the Dusty Rhodes Tag Team Classic began on the January 9, 2024, episode of NXT and culminated at Vengeance Day on February 4, 2024. This single-elimination tournament consisted of 8 tag teams. In the tournament final, Baron Corbin and Bron Breakker defeated Carmelo Hayes and Trick Williams.

=== 2026 tournament ===
The ninth edition of the Dusty Rhodes Tag Team Classic began on the September 22, 2026, episode of NXT. This single-elimination tournament featured 14 tag teams from WWE's Raw, SmackDown, NXT, and Evolve brands, as well as their sister promotion Lucha Libre AAA Worldwide (AAA). NXT Tag Team Champions The Vanity Project (Brad Baylor and Ricky Smokes) and AAA World Tag Team Champions The Wagner Brothers (El Hijo de Dr. Wagner Jr. and Galeno) received byes in the first round due to their championship status; they automatically advanced to the quarterfinals, although both teams were eliminated in the semifinals. In the final, Noam Dar and Romeo Moreno defeated Hank & Tank (Hank Walker and Tank Ledger), with Cody Rhodes again being the guest commentator and presenter of the trophy.

2026 Dusty Rhodes Tag Team Classic bracket

First round NXT; September 22 – October 6, 2026
NXT	Birthright (C Lorenzo and U Connors)	12:10
AAA; Evolve	Mini Vikingo; Chazz "Starboy" Hall	Pinfall
SD	Fraxiom (Note: Fraxiom consists of Nathan Frazer and Axiom.)	Pinfall
NXT	DarkState (Note: DarkState consisted of Cutler James and Osiris Griffin.)	7:00
NXT	Noam Dar; Romeo Moreno	Pinfall
Raw; AAA	Los Americanos (Note: Los Americanos consisted of Rayo Americano and Bravo Americano.)	14:31
AAA	Tokyo Bad Boys (Note: Tokyo Bad Boys consisted of Kento and Takuma.)	4:40
NXT	Birthright (Note: Sean Legacy and Dorian Van Dux were the original participants. On the October 6, 2026, episode of NXT, Legacy and Dux were attacked backstage by Birthright before their first round match. William Regal convinced NXT General Manager Robert Stone to put in Birthright's Charlie Dempsey and Lexis King as Legacy and Dux's replacement.) (C Dempsey and L King)	Pinfall
Raw; NXT	The Creed Brothers (Note: The Creed Brothers consists of Brutus Creed and Julius Creed.)	Pinfall
Evolve	Harley Riggins; Jax Presley	3:35
Evolve	Shido Ash; Viktor Zanov	9:15
NXT	Hank & Tank	Pinfall

Quarterfinals; NXT; October 13–20, 2026
NXT	The Vanity Project (Note: The Vanity Project consists of Brad Baylor and Ricky Smokes.)	Pinfall
AAA; Evolve	Mini Vikingo; Chazz "Starboy" Hall	12:55
SD	Fraxiom	14:25
NXT	Noam Dar; Romeo Moreno	Pinfall
AAA	The Wagner Brothers (Note: The Wagner Brothers consists of El Hijo de Dr. Wagner Jr. and Galeno.)	Pinfall
NXT	Birthright (C Dempsey and L King)	13:13
Raw; NXT	The Creed Brothers	11:04
NXT	Hank & Tank	Pinfall

Semifinals; NXT; October 27, 2026
NXT	The Vanity Project	14:11
NXT	Noam Dar; Romeo Moreno	Pinfall
AAA	The Wagner Brothers	10:53
NXT	Hank & Tank	Pinfall

Final; NXT; November 4, 2026
NXT	Noam Dar; Romeo Moreno	Pinfall
NXT	Hank & Tank (Note: Hank & Tank consists of Hank Walker and Tank Ledger.)	11:10

== See also ==
- List of WWE pay-per-view and WWE Network events
