= WWE Vengeance =

Professional wrestling event series

- NXT Vengeance Day logo used since 2026
- Promotions: WWE
- Brands: Raw (2002, 2004–2007); SmackDown (2002–2003, 2007); ECW (2007); NXT (2021–present)
- Other names: Vengeance: Night of Champions (2007); NXT Vengeance Day (2021—present)
- First event: 2001

WWE Vengeance, known as NXT Vengeance Day since 2021, is an American professional wrestling event produced by WWE, a professional wrestling promotion based in Connecticut. The event was originally created in 2001 and broadcast as a pay-per-view (PPV), when the promotion was still called the World Wrestling Federation (WWF; renamed WWE in 2002). Since 2021, the event has been held annually for WWE's developmental brand, NXT, under the title NXT Vengeance Day; from 2021 to 2025, it was held in February either on or around Valentine's Day as a reference to the event's name, but it moved to March in 2026. The 2021 event aired on both traditional PPV and via livestreaming, with the 2022 event broadcast as a television special before airing exclusively via WWE's livestreaming platforms since 2023.

The event initially replaced Armageddon for the promotion's December 2001 PPV due to sensitivity issues following the September 11 attacks. However, Armageddon would return the following year, with Vengeance moving up to July as a replacement for Fully Loaded. Following the promotion being renamed to WWE and the implementation of the brand extension in early 2002, the event was made exclusive to the SmackDown brand in 2003, and then Raw from 2004 to 2006 before WWE discontinued brand-exclusive PPVs. This in turn allowed the ECW brand to be involved in 2007, but that would be the only year to include ECW.

In 2007, Vengeance was held as Vengeance: Night of Champions, with all of WWE's championships at the time being contested. Night of Champions would replace Vengeance as a standalone chronology the following year, but Vengeance made a one-off return in October 2011. In February 2021, WWE revived Vengeance for the NXT brand as a TakeOver event called Vengeance Day, which was the first Vengeance to air via livestreaming in addition to traditional PPV. The TakeOver series was discontinued that September, however, Vengeance continued on under the Vengeance Day name with the 2022 event being held as a special episode of the NXT program on the USA Network, thus establishing Vengeance Day as an annual NXT event. The 2023 event returned Vengeance to livestreaming, but not PPV, as beginning with Stand & Deliver in April 2022, NXT's major events only air on WWE's livestreaming platforms.

== History ==
The inaugural Vengeance was held on December 9, 2001, replacing Armageddon as the then-World Wrestling Federation's (WWF) December pay-per-view (PPV); WWF staff felt that the "Armageddon" title was too sensitive following the September 11 attacks. However, Armageddon would return the following year, with Vengeance moving up to July as a replacement for Fully Loaded (which had been replaced in 2001 by Invasion, the first PPV to incorporate the Invasion angle). The 2002 event was also the first Vengeance to be promoted under the World Wrestling Entertainment (WWE) name, after the WWF was renamed to WWE earlier that same year.

Following the brand extension in early 2002, where the promotion divided its roster into two separate brands where wrestlers exclusively performed on their respective weekly television programs, Vengeance became exclusive to SmackDown! in 2003, and then Raw from 2004 through 2006. WWE then discontinued brand-exclusive pay-per-views following WrestleMania 23 in April 2007; the 2007 edition was branded as Vengeance: Night of Champions, with all nine of WWE's championships at the time being contested, which included the ECW brand, which had been established the previous year. Night of Champions would become its own chronology in 2008, replacing Vengeance in its July slot on WWE's PPV lineup.

In April 2011, WWE ceased using its full name with the "WWE" abbreviation becoming an orphaned initialism, while that August, the brand extension ended. That October, Vengeance made a one-off return, replacing Bragging Rights. Vengeance was again discontinued after 2011. In January 2021, over four years after the brand split was reinstated, WWE's NXT brand announced that it would revive Vengeance as an NXT TakeOver show on February 14 titled NXT TakeOver: Vengeance Day; its title also alluded to the event's Valentine's Day scheduling. This would also be the first Vengeance to air on WWE's online streaming service, the WWE Network (which launched in February 2014), in addition to traditional PPV. Due to the COVID-19 pandemic, the event was held in a bio-secure bubble called the Capitol Wrestling Center, hosted at the WWE Performance Center in Orlando, Florida.

In September 2021, NXT was rebranded and reverted the brand to its original function as WWE's developmental brand. The TakeOver series was also discontinued, but Vengeance Day continued on as its own event, with the 2022 event scheduled for February 15, 2022. Unlike all previous Vengeance events, however, the 2022 event was held as a television special, airing as a special episode of NXT. This in turn established Vengeance Day as NXT's annual Valentine's event.

On December 8, 2022, WWE announced that the 2023 Vengeance Day would be held on Saturday, February 4, 2023, at the Spectrum Center in Charlotte, North Carolina, marking the first major NXT event to be held in North Carolina and the second Vengeance event held at this venue after the 2006 event (when the venue was still called the Charlotte Bobcats Arena). It was also announced that it would return to being a premium live event (PLE), a term the company introduced on January 1, 2022, to refer to its events airing on PPV and via livestreaming. The event aired on Peacock in the United States and the WWE Network in international markets, in turn marking the first Vengeance to air on Peacock following the shutdown of the American version of the WWE Network in April 2021. It was also the first Vengeance to not air on PPV as WWE ceased broadcasting NXT's PLEs on PPV as of 2022. This also marked NXT's first standalone PLE event to be held outside of Florida since NXT TakeOver: Portland in February 2020, just before the onset of the COVID-19 pandemic.

The 2026 Vengeance Day was the first to not be held around Valentine's Day, as it was held on March 7, also making it the first Vengeance overall to be held in March. This was also notably the final NXT event to stream on Peacock as WWE's contract for NXT's events on the service expired on March 15, with the US subsequently transitioning to YouTube for the following event, Stand & Deliver in April, and then The CW beginning with The Great American Bash in June. This was also notably the final event to stream on the WWE Network in any country as the service permanently shut down on April 1 in the remaining four countries that were still on the platform, with these countries subsequently transitioning to Netflix.

== Events ==
Raw-branded event	SmackDown-branded event	NXT-branded event

#	Event	Date	City	Venue	Main event	Ref.
1	Vengeance (2001)	December 9, 2001	San Diego, California	San Diego Sports Arena	Stone Cold Steve Austin (WWF) vs. Chris Jericho (World) in a championship unification match to unify the WWF Championship and World Championship as the Undisputed WWF Championship	
2	Vengeance (2002)	July 21, 2002	Detroit, Michigan	Joe Louis Arena	The Undertaker (c) vs. Kurt Angle vs. The Rock in a triple threat match for the WWE Undisputed Championship	
3	Vengeance (2003)	July 27, 2003	Denver, Colorado	Pepsi Center	Brock Lesnar (c) vs. Big Show vs. Kurt Angle in a triple threat match for the WWE Championship	
4	Vengeance (2004)	July 11, 2004	Hartford, Connecticut	Hartford Civic Center	Chris Benoit (c) vs. Triple H for the World Heavyweight Championship	
5	Vengeance (2005)	June 26, 2005	Paradise, Nevada	Thomas & Mack Center	Batista (c) vs. Triple H in a Hell in a Cell match for the World Heavyweight Championship	
6	Vengeance (2006)	June 25, 2006	Charlotte, North Carolina	Charlotte Bobcats Arena	D-Generation X (Triple H and Shawn Michaels) vs. The Spirit Squad (Kenny, Johnny, Mitch, Nicky, and Mikey) in a 2-on-5 Handicap tag team match	
7	Vengeance: Night of Champions	June 24, 2007	Houston, Texas	Toyota Center	John Cena (c) vs. Bobby Lashley vs. King Booker vs. Mick Foley vs. Randy Orton in a Five-Pack Challenge for the WWE Championship	
8	Vengeance (2011)	October 23, 2011	San Antonio, Texas	AT&T Center	Alberto Del Rio (c) vs. John Cena in a Last Man Standing match for the WWE Championship	
9	NXT TakeOver: Vengeance Day	February 14, 2021	Orlando, Florida	Capitol Wrestling Center at WWE Performance Center	Finn Bálor (c) vs. Pete Dunne for the NXT Championship	
10	NXT Vengeance Day (2022)	February 15, 2022	Orlando, Florida	WWE Performance Center	Bron Breakker (c) vs. Santos Escobar for the NXT Championship	
11	NXT Vengeance Day (2023)	February 4, 2023	Charlotte, North Carolina	Spectrum Center	Bron Breakker (c) vs. Grayson Waller in a Steel Cage match for the NXT Championship	
12	NXT Vengeance Day (2024)	February 4, 2024	Clarksville, Tennessee	F&M Bank Arena	Ilja Dragunov (c) vs. Trick Williams for the NXT Championship	
13	NXT Vengeance Day (2025)	February 15, 2025	Washington, D.C.	CareFirst Arena	Giulia (c) vs. Bayley vs. Roxanne Perez vs. Cora Jade in a Fatal four-way match for the NXT Women's Championship	
14	NXT Vengeance Day (2026)	March 7, 2026	Orlando, Florida	WWE Performance Center	Joe Hendry (c) vs. Ricky Saints for the NXT Championship	
(c) – refers to the champion(s) heading into the match

== See also ==
- List of WWE pay-per-view and livestreaming supercards
- List of WWE NXT special episodes
