= NXT: Vengeance Day (2022) =

WWE television special

- Promotion: WWE
- Brand: NXT 2.0
- Date: February 15, 2022
- City: Orlando, Florida
- Venue: WWE Performance Center

NXT special episodes chronology
← Previous; New Year's Evil	Next → Roadblock

Vengeance Day chronology
← Previous; NXT TakeOver: Vengeance Day	Next → 2023

The 2022 NXT: Vengeance Day was a professional wrestling television special produced by WWE, held exclusively for wrestlers from the promotion's developmental brand, NXT 2.0. It was NXT's second annual Vengeance Day, and WWE's 10th Vengeance overall, and aired as a special episode of the weekly series NXT 2.0. It took place on February 15, 2022, at NXT's home venue, the WWE Performance Center in Orlando, Florida for a second consecutive year. In lieu of NXT's normal channel, the USA Network, the special aired on Syfy due to USA's broadcasting of the 2022 Winter Olympics.

In February 2021, WWE revived Vengeance as an NXT TakeOver event called Vengeance Day; the name was a reference to its Valentine's Day scheduling. That September, however, the TakeOver series was discontinued along with NXT's rebranding as NXT 2.0. With the scheduling of this 2022 event, Vengeance Day became its own event as well as NXT's annual Valentine's event. Unlike all previous Vengeance events, which aired on pay-per-view as well as livestreaming on the WWE Network in 2021, this was the only Vengeance to air as a television special, as the following year's event returned to livestreaming.

Five matches were contested at the event. In the main event, Bron Breakker defeated Santos Escobar to retain the NXT Championship. The event garnered positive reviews from critics, with much praise directed towards the NXT North American Championship match between Cameron Grimes and Carmelo Hayes.

== Production ==
=== Background ===
Vengeance was originally established as a pay-per-view (PPV) event for WWE in 2001 and it was held annually until 2007, followed by one event in 2011. In February 2021, WWE reinstated Vengeance for its NXT brand as a TakeOver event called Vengeance Day, and it aired on PPV and was livestreamed on the WWE Network. Its title was also a reference to its Valentine's Day scheduling. The TakeOver series was then discontinued in September 2021 after NXT was rebranded to NXT 2.0, reverting NXT to being WWE's developmental brand.

On January 25, 2022, WWE announced that Vengeance would continue for NXT under the Vengeance Day name, but unlike all previous Vengeance events, the 2022 Vengeance Day would be held as a special episode of NXT 2.0. The brand's second Vengeance Day, and WWE's 10th Vengeance overall, was scheduled to be held on February 15, 2022, at NXT's home venue, the WWE Performance Center in Orlando, Florida for a second consecutive year. This in turn established Vengeance Day as NXT's annual Valentine's event. Additionally, due to USA Network's broadcasting of the 2022 Winter Olympics in NXT's normal time slot, the television special aired on Syfy.

=== Storylines ===
The card included matches that resulted from scripted storylines. Results were predetermined by WWE's writers on the NXT brand, while storylines were produced on WWE's weekly television program, NXT 2.0.

On January 4, 2022, at NXT: New Year's Evil, Bron Breakker defeated Tommaso Ciampa to win the NXT Championship for the first time in his career. On the following week's episode of NXT, Breakker gave thanks to Ciampa for congratulating him on his win and paying respect to his father Rick Steiner. As Breakker left the ring, he crossed paths with Santos Escobar and Legado Del Fantasma (Joaquin Wilde and Raul Mendoza) as he was getting ready for his upcoming match. On the January 25 episode, Escobar was in the ring with Legado Del Fantasma, complaining how Breakker rose quickly in NXT and captured the title before him. Breakker appeared and told Escobar he accepted his challenge, but Escobar said it would be done on his time and he would let Breakker know when he was ready. On February 5, Breakker was scheduled to defend the title against Escobar at Vengeance Day. On the February 8 episode of NXT, a Championship Summit was held where both Breakker and Escobar traded words on who was going to leave Vengeance Day as champion, when Raw roster member Dolph Ziggler appeared and confronted Breakker over his comments about him on Twitter, and said that he had never held the NXT Championship. Ciampa then appeared to confront Ziggler, which caused Escobar to say that once he became champion, he would deal with the both of them. Ciampa and Ziggler brawled at ringside, leaving Breakker to get beaten down by Wilde and Mendoza, and double powerbombed through the table.

At NXT: New Year's Evil, the seventh Dusty Rhodes Tag Team Classic was announced, with the eight-man tournament beginning on January 18. On the February 8 episode of NXT, the semifinals took place with MSK (Nash Carter and Wes Lee) defeating Edris Enofé and Malik Blade, and The Creed Brothers (Brutus Creed and Julius Creed) defeating Grizzled Young Veterans (James Drake and Zack Gibson) to advance and meet in the final at Vengeance Day.

On December 5, 2021, at NXT WarGames, Tony D'Angelo took out Pete Dunne with a crowbar and took his mouth guard during the Men's WarGames match. Dunne took it back from D'Angelo on the December 14 episode of NXT and defeated him in the main event the following week. After the match, D'Angelo attacked Dunne's hand with a crowbar, causing him to writhe in pain. On the January 11, 2022, episode, D'Angelo defeated Dunne in a Crowbar on a Pole match. The following week, D'Angelo conducted a memorial service for Dunne's career and set his sights on Carmelo Hayes's NXT North American Championship. On the January 25 episode of NXT, D'Angelo fought Cameron Grimes in a number one contender's match for a shot at the title at Vengeance Day, but lost after Dunne appeared and hit his hand with a cricket bat. The following week, Dunne challenged D'Angelo to a Steel Cage match, which was scheduled for Vengeance Day. On the February 8 episode, Dunne upped the stipulation after avoiding his crowbar attacks during a match with Draco Anthony, throwing in chairs, crowbars, kendo sticks, and a toolbox in the ring to make it a weaponized steel cage match.

On October 26, 2021, at NXT: Halloween Havoc, Toxic Attraction (Gigi Dolin and Jacy Jayne) defeated the team of Io Shirai and Zoey Stark and the team of Indi Hartwell and Persia Pirotta in a Triple Threat Tag Team Scareway to Hell Ladder match to win the NXT Women's Tag Team Championship for the first time in their careers. On the January 25, 2022, episode of NXT, Dolin and Jayne (alongside NXT Women's Champion Mandy Rose) competed in a six-woman tag team match against Hartwell, Pirotta, and Kay Lee Ray, where they lost after Dolin was pinned by Pirotta. The following week, Toxic Attraction appeared in the ring to tell Hartwell and Pirotta that they signed their "death sentence" after their fluke win the previous week, saying they were putting their tag title on the line against them at Vengeance Day.

== Event ==
=== Preliminary matches ===
The television special began with Pete Dunne taking on Tony D'Angelo in a weaponized steel cage match. Throughout the match, the two used various weapons, and both kicked out of their respective finishing moves (D'Angelo out of a Bitter End and Dunne out of a Fisherman's Buster). In the climax, Dunne found a crowbar and struck D'Angelo with it twice. Dunne followed up with a second Bitter End on D'Angelo to win the match.

Following this, footage was shown of Cora Jade and Raquel González training for the 2022 Women's Dusty Rhodes Tag Team Classic.

In the second match, Toxic Attraction (Gigi Dolin and Jacy Jayne, accompanied by NXT Women's Champion Mandy Rose) defended the NXT Women's Tag Team Championship against Indi Hartwell and Persia Pirotta. During the match, Rose sent Hartwell back in the ring. The referee saw this and ejected Rose from ringside. In the climax, Jayne sent Pirotta into the steel ring steps. As Hartwell went for her springboard elbow drop, Jayne intercepted it, and Jayne and Dolin followed up with a high-low kick combo on Hartwell to retain the titles.

Afterwards, LA Knight tried to address the fans, but was interrupted by his longtime rival Grayson Waller, who told the police officers to arrest Knight due to Knight violating the restraining order. Waller said that the restraining order was set up after Knight's attack on Waller after the latter's match on the January 11 episode of NXT. However, Knight showed footage of Waller breaking the restraining order with an attack on Knight on the February 1 episode. As a result, Waller stated that the restraining order was void. Knight then laid out Waller and Sanga. It was subsequently announced that Knight would face Waller on the following episode of NXT.

In the third match, Carmelo Hayes (accompanied by Trick Williams) defended the NXT North American Championship against Cameron Grimes. During the match, Grimes performed a Sidewalk Slam on Hayes for a nearfall. Hayes performed a Codebreaker on Grimes for a nearfall. Later, Williams tried to interfere, but Grimes sent Hayes into Williams and followed up with a frankensteiner on Hayes. Grimes then performed a top rope Crossbody on Hayes for a nearfall. Grimes attempted a Cave In, but Hayes rolled out of the ring. After Grimes performed a Cave In on Williams, Hayes sent Grimes into the barricade. Back inside the ring, Hayes performed a La Mistica Slam for a nearfall. In the climax, Grimes countered a crossface into a pinning combination for a nearfall. Hayes then whiplashed Grimes on the top rope and followed up with a diving leg drop on Grimes to retain the title.

In the penultimate match, MSK (Wes Lee and Nash Carter) took on The Creed Brothers (Brutus Creed and Julius Creed) in the finals of the 2022 Men's Dusty Rhodes Tag Team Classic. During the match, Julius sent Lee off the apron and into the announce table. After more back-and-forth, Lee performed a twisting Senton on Julius for a nearfall. Lee then catapulted Julius into a Stomp by Carter, but Brutus broke up the pin. In the closing moments, after Brutus took out Lee, Carter attempted a Suicide Dive, but Julius caught him and performed a Cartwheel Slam. Back inside the ring, Julius performed a Basement Lariat on Carter to win the tournament and earn a future NXT Tag Team Championship match.

Following this, Imperium (Gunther and NXT Tag Team Champions Fabian Aichner and Marcel Barthel) talked about The Creed Brothers' (Brutus Creed and Julius Creed) Dusty Rhodes Tag Team Classic win. Gunther stated that he would be watching the NXT Championship match before being interrupted by Solo Sikoa. Sikoa talked trash to Gunther before laying down a challenge.

After that, as Trick Williams and NXT North American Champion Carmelo Hayes were talking backstage, they were confronted by Pete Dunne, who told Hayes that he was still the champion, for now.

=== Main event ===
In the main event, Bron Breakker defended the NXT Championship against Santos Escobar, who was accompanied by Legado Del Fantasma (Joaquin Wilde, Raul Mendoza, and Elektra Lopez). Before Breakker's entrance, he burned the old Vengeance logo. After an even match between Breakker and Escobar, Legado Del Fantasma interfered in the match, allowing Dolph Ziggler to perform a Superkick on Breakker for a nearfall. Shortly afterwards, Tommaso Ciampa appeared and brawled with Ziggler, which spilled backstage. Escobar attempted a Frog Splash, but Breakker moved out of the way and performed a Spear on Escobar. Breakker then performed a Military Press Powerslam on Escobar to retain the title.

== Reception ==
Matthew McFarlin of Slam Wrestling gave the event 4 out of 5 stars, saying: "[W]ith relatively quick matches, tonight's entire lineup was exciting and effective. The "WWE style" bogged down the main event's first half, but when the chains are off for people like Carmelo Hayes and MSK, the in-ring action is amazing stuff." John Moore of Pro Wrestling Dot Net praised the Weaponized Steel Cage opener for being "a fun hardcore match" that was "creative and Takeover worthy" and showcases D'Angelo's rapid growth in his early wrestling career, the Women's Tag Title match for being a "really fun women's tag team match", called the North American Title bout a "great match between two smart in-ring technicians", the Creeds-MSK tag team bout a "fun Dusty Rhodes Classic final with the right team going over", and praised Escobar for carrying Breakker during their NXT Championship main event. He concluded that: "NXT continues to deliver with these themed shows. Even with rookies like Tony D'Angelo or Bron Breakker, top to bottom this show was a good wrestling show. I'd argue that Breakker and D'Angelo would be able to have great matches on Takeover. The rest of the show, solid as well. A nice return to form for NXT.

Jeremy Thomas of 411Mania called the North American Championship match "unequivocally great" and displayed "execellent work" from Hayes and Grimes, praised the NXT Championship main event for being "a strong effort for both men", felt the Weaponized Steel Cage opener and Dusty Rhodes Classic Finals were good matches that needed a couple more minutes, and criticized the Women's Tag Title bout for not clicking and getting out of second gear. He gave the event an 8.5 out of 10, concluding that: "It's not my favorite of the NXT special episodes of the last few years and a title change would have made this feel more significant, but all the champions really should keep the gold right now so I have no major complaints. Good show, NXT." Kevin Pantoja, also writing for 411Mania, praised the North American Title bout as the "best thing on the show" that highlights Hayes as a "goddamn star", the NXT Championship match as a "good main event that played to the strengths of the guys involved", called the Dusty Rhodes Classic Finals "a quality match" that shows the Creeds' growing improvement, felt the Weaponized Steel Cage opener had "some highlights" but criticized the redundant weapon usage, and was "disappointed" with the Women's Tag Title bout. He gave the show a 7 out of 10, concluding: "[T]hat was an enjoyable event. The only lame match was the Tag Titles, while everything else hovered around being good, and one thing was great."

== Aftermath ==
As a result of winning the 2022 Men's Dusty Rhodes Tag Team Classic, The Creed Brothers (Brutus Creed and Julius Creed) were scheduled to take on Imperium (Fabian Aichner and Marcel Barthel) for the NXT Tag Team Championship at NXT: Roadblock on March 8, but they were attacked backstage. They were replaced by MSK (Wes Lee and Nash Carter). The match ended when The Creed Brothers attacked both teams, ending the match in a no-contest with Imperium retaining the titles. The following week, a triple threat tag team match between the three teams for the titles was scheduled for NXT Stand & Deliver.

On the following episode of NXT, NXT North American Champion Carmelo Hayes was confronted by Pete Dunne, setting up a match between the two for the title for the following week, where Hayes retained after interference from Trick Williams. Hayes then announced that he would defend the title in a ladder match at Stand & Deliver. This would be Dunne's final NXT appearance before he was promoted to the main roster on SmackDown and debuted on the March 11 episode of SmackDown under the new ring name Butch, joining Sheamus and Ridge Holland as part of The Brawling Brutes.

During Vengeance Day, a match between Tommaso Ciampa and Dolph Ziggler was announced for the following week where the winner would be the number one contender for Bron Breakker's NXT Championship. Ziggler won the match after interference from a cameraman, who was later revealed to be Ziggler's tag team partner, Robert Roode. Afterwards, Breakker attacked Ziggler and Roode and, along with Ciampa, challenged them to a match for the March 1 episode. On that episode, Ciampa and Breakker won when Ciampa pinned Ziggler. As a result, Ciampa was added to the match, making it a triple threat match, and the match was scheduled for NXT: Roadblock.

After Carmelo Hayes and Pete Dunne announced their NXT North American Championship match for the following week, Cameron Grimes attacked Hayes and Trick Williams from behind, setting up a match between Grimes and Williams immediately afterwards, where Grimes was victorious. Grimes then qualified for the final spot in the NXT North American Championship ladder match by winning a triple threat match on the March 29 episode of NXT.

Also on NXT, Grayson Waller and LA Knight had their match, where Waller won, but after the match, Knight attacked Waller and Sanga. The following week, Knight challenged Waller to a Last Man Standing match, and Waller accepted. The match was subsequently scheduled for Roadblock.

After Indi Hartwell and Persia Pirotta failed to defeat Toxic Attraction (Gigi Dolin and Jacy Jayne) for the NXT Women's Tag Team Championship, they entered the 2022 Women's Dusty Rhodes Tag Team Classic, but lost to Dakota Kai and Wendy Choo in the first round.

Also on the following episode of NXT, Imperium (Gunther, Fabian Aichner, and Marcel Barthel) confronted The Creed Brothers (Brutus Creed and Julius Creed) and Malcolm Bivens in the ring. A brawl broke out between the two teams, and Solo Sikoa superkicked Gunther to save Bivens. This led to a match between Gunther and Sikoa for the following week where Gunther was victorious.

While the 2022 Vengeance Day was held as a television special, the following year's event returned to livestreaming, although not PPV, as WWE ceased broadcasting NXT's events on PPV beginning with the 2022 Stand & Deliver. The 2023 would be the first Vengeance branded as a premium live event (PLE), a term the company introduced on January 1, 2022, to refer to its events airing on PPV and via livestreaming. The 2023 event would be NXT's first standalone PLE since NXT TakeOver: Portland in February 2020 to take place outside of Florida. The 2023 event was also the first Vengeance to air on Peacock in the United States, Disney+ Hotstar in Indonesia, Disney+ in the Philippines, and Binge in Australia, due to their respective versions of the WWE Network merging under those services in April 2021, January 2022, November 2022, and January 2023, respectively.

== Results ==
No.	Results	Stipulations	Times
1	Pete Dunne defeated Tony D'Angelo by pinfall	Weaponized Steel Cage match	9:52
2	Toxic Attraction (Gigi Dolin and Jacy Jayne) (c) (with Mandy Rose) defeated Indi Hartwell and Persia Pirotta by pinfall	Tag team match for the NXT Women's Tag Team Championship	7:54
3	Carmelo Hayes (c) (with Trick Williams) defeated Cameron Grimes by pinfall	Singles match for the NXT North American Championship	15:57
4	The Creed Brothers (Brutus Creed and Julius Creed) (with Malcolm Bivens) defeated MSK (Nash Carter and Wes Lee) by pinfall	Men's Dusty Rhodes Tag Team Classic finals Winners received a future NXT Tag Team Championship match.	9:36
5	Bron Breakker (c) defeated Santos Escobar (with Legado Del Fantasma) by pinfall	Singles match for the NXT Championship	12:05
(c) / – the champion(s) heading into the match

=== Men's Dusty Rhodes Tag Team Classic ===
First round NXT; January 18–25, 2022
MSK (Wes Lee and Nash Carter)	Pinfall
Jacket Time (Ikemen Jiro and Kushida)	11:42
Edris Enofé and Malik Blade	Pinfall
Legado Del Fantasma (Joaquin Wilde and Raul Mendoza)	3:17
Brooks Jensen and Josh Briggs	5:33
The Creed Brothers (Brutus Creed and Julius Creed)	Pinfall
Chase University (Andre Chase and Bodhi Hayward)	5:11
Grizzled Young Veterans (James Drake and Zack Gibson)	Pinfall

Semifinals; NXT; February 8, 2022
MSK	Pinfall
Edris Enofé and Malik Blade	9:29
The Creed Brothers	Pinfall
Grizzled Young Veterans	12:01

Final; Vengeance Day; February 15, 2022
MSK	9:36
The Creed Brothers	Pinfall
