= Survivor Series (2011) =

WWE pay-per-view event

- Promotional poster featuring The Rock and John Cena
- Promotion: WWE
- Date: November 20, 2011
- City: New York City, New York
- Venue: Madison Square Garden
- Attendance: 16,749
- Buy rate: 281,000
- Tagline: The Most Charismatic Tag Team of All Time... Never Before. Never Again.

Pay-per-view chronology
← Previous; Vengeance	Next → TLC: Tables, Ladders & Chairs

Survivor Series chronology
← Previous; 2010	Next → 2012

The 2011 Survivor Series was a professional wrestling pay-per-view (PPV) event produced by WWE. It was the 25th annual Survivor Series and took place on November 20, 2011, from Madison Square Garden in the New York City borough of Manhattan, New York. This was the third Survivor Series held at Madison Square Garden, after 1996 and 2002. The event was highlighted by the titular Survivor Series match, a tag team elimination match that pits teams of multiple wrestlers against each other.

Seven matches were contested at the event, six of which were broadcast live on pay-per-view. The main events from this installment of Survivor Series would have a lasting effect on the next year in WWE. In the main event, The Rock, in his first WWE in-ring match since WrestleMania XX in March 2004, teamed up with his WrestleMania XXVIII opponent John Cena to defeat The Miz and R-Truth. A predominant match saw Big Show defeat World Heavyweight Champion Mark Henry by disqualification, but did not win the title as titles do not change hands on disqualification unless stipulated. In another predominant match on the card, CM Punk was victorious over Alberto Del Rio by submission to win the WWE Championship, a reign that would continue until the 2013 Royal Rumble, the 11th-longest in the company's history. One Survivor Series match occurred, in which Team Barrett (Wade Barrett, Cody Rhodes, Dolph Ziggler, Hunico, and Jack Swagger) defeated Team Orton (Randy Orton, Kofi Kingston, Mason Ryan, Sheamus, and Sin Cara).

The event garnered 281,000 pay-per-view buys, up from 244,000 buys of the previous year's event. This was the first Survivor Series held following the end of the first brand extension in August. It was also the first Survivor Series held to be promoted under the company's shortened trade name of WWE, as following WrestleMania XXVII in April, the company ceased using its full name of World Wrestling Entertainment, although that remains the legal name of the company.

== Production ==
=== Background ===
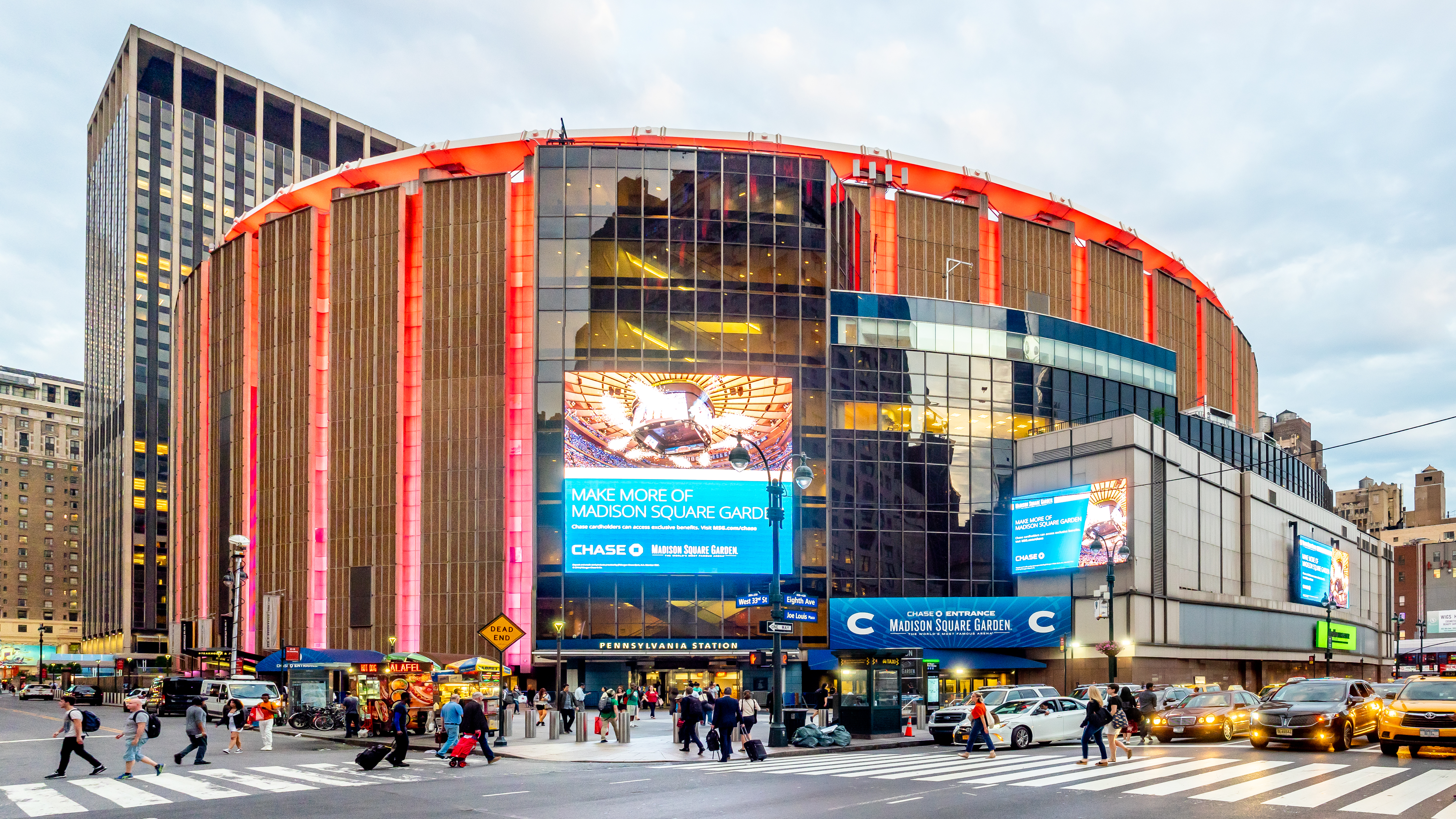
The 25th annual Survivor Series was the third time for the event to be held at Madison Square Garden in New York City, New York, after 1996 and 2002.

Survivor Series is an annual professional wrestling pay-per-view (PPV) event, produced every November by WWE since 1987, generally held around Thanksgiving in the United States. In what has become the second longest-running pay-per-view event in history (behind WWE's WrestleMania), it is one of the promotion's original four pay-per-views, along with WrestleMania, SummerSlam, and Royal Rumble, referred to as the "Big Four". The event is traditionally characterized by having Survivor Series matches, which are tag team elimination matches that typically pits teams of four or five wrestlers against each other. The 25th Survivor Series was scheduled to be held on November 20, 2011, from Madison Square Garden in the New York City borough of Manhattan, New York, which was the third Survivor Series at Madison Square Garden, after 1996 and 2002. Tickets sold out in only 90 minutes.

The 2011 event was hyped in New York City by a huge fan interaction event outside of Madison Square Garden two days before the event, which included a first look at the WWE '12 video game, a signing with CM Punk, and a performance from the band Oleander. The event was attended by over 16,000 WWE fans, including one who received two tickets to the sold out event from The Rock. Also in attendance were Zack Ryder and Jimmy Hart, who gave a bus tour of New York to 150 fans who won tickets via WWE.com in the weeks leading to the event.

This was the first Survivor Series held since the end of the first brand split in August. It was also the first Survivor Series held to be promoted under the company's shortened trade name of WWE, as following WrestleMania XXVII in April, the company ceased using its full name of World Wrestling Entertainment, although that remains the legal name of the company.

=== Storylines ===
Survivor Series featured professional wrestling matches involving different wrestlers from pre-existing scripted feuds, plots, and storylines that developed on WWE's television programs, Raw and SmackDown. Wrestlers portrayed heroes or villains as they followed a series of events that built tension and culminated in a wrestling match or series of matches.

The main event involved WrestleMania XXVIII opponents John Cena and The Rock teaming against the Awesome Truth (The Miz and R-Truth). After losing to Alberto Del Rio the previous month at Vengeance due to interference by The Miz and R-Truth. Cena decided to face both of them with Zack Ryder as his partner, but Miz and R-Truth ambushed Ryder before the match, in which they beat Cena down. Former Interim General Manager John Laurinaitis booked Cena with a match against Miz and Truth at Survivor Series with a partner of his choice, with Cena choosing his WrestleMania XXVIII opponent, The Rock, as his partner. Billed as the most charismatic team of all time, The Rock accepted his offer the following week.

Three months prior at SummerSlam, Alberto Del Rio cashed in his Money in the Bank contract against WWE Champion CM Punk to win the title. Punk got a rematch at Hell in a Cell but it was a triple threat match and John Cena was the champion going into the match. Punk requested to have another one-on-one rematch for the championship. Del Rio objected but accepted the challenge after Punk locked him into an Anaconda Vise.

The event also included World Heavyweight Champion Mark Henry defending his title against Big Show. The two had wrestled each other the previous month at Vengeance, but during the match the ring had collapsed, leaving both men unable to continue. A rematch was scheduled for Survivor Series, with a reinforced ring being set up.

A Survivor Series elimination match pitting Team Orton, consisting of Randy Orton, Sheamus, Sin Cara, Mason Ryan, and Kofi Kingston, against Team Barrett, consisting of Wade Barrett, Cody Rhodes, Dolph Ziggler, Jack Swagger, and Hunico, was also scheduled for the event. Christian was originally part of Team Barrett, but was pulled from the team after suffering an ankle injury during WWE's European Tour.

== Event ==
Other on-screen personnel
Role:	Name:
English Commentators	Michael Cole
English Commentators	Jerry Lawler
English Commentators	Booker T
Spanish Commentators	Carlos Cabrera
Spanish Commentators	Marcelo Rodriguez
Backstage interviewer	Josh Mathews
Ring announcers	Justin Roberts
Ring announcers	Tony Chimel
Ring announcers	Howard Finkel (Punk vs. Del Rio)
Referees	Charles Robinson
Referees	Mike Chioda
Referees	John Cone
Referees	Scott Armstrong
Referees	Chad Patton

=== Preliminary matches ===
In the first match, Dolph Ziggler defended the United States Championship against John Morrison. Ziggler performed a Zig Zag on Morrison to retain the title. After the match, Zack Ryder attacked Ziggler.

Next, Beth Phoenix defended the Divas Championship against Eve Torres in a Lumberjill match. Phoenix won by pinning Eve after a Glam Slam from the top rope to retain the title.

In the third match, Team Barrett (Wade Barrett, Cody Rhodes, Hunico, Jack Swagger, and Dolph Ziggler) faced Team Orton (Randy Orton, Sheamus, Kofi Kingston, Mason Ryan, and Sin Cara). Ziggler was the first man eliminated after an RKO. Sin Cara was eliminated after sustaining a legitimate injury. Ryan was then eliminated after Cross Rhodes by Rhodes. Kingston was eliminated by Wasteland by Barrett. Sheamus was disqualified after not breaking the referee's 5 count near the ropes. In frustration, Sheamus Brogue Kicked Swagger, who was then pinned by Orton. Hunico was next eliminated after Orton executed a RKO in mid-air on him. Following a distraction by Rhodes, Orton was pinned by Barrett, giving Team Barrett the win and leaving Rhodes and Barrett as the survivors.

Next, Mark Henry defended the World Heavyweight Championship against Big Show. During the match, Henry tackled Big Show through the barricade, but Big Show got into the ring before the 10-count. Big Show then performed a diving elbow drop to Henry. Big Show then attempted his finisher, the WMD but Henry performed a low blow to Big Show, causing a disqualification. After the match Big Show placed a steel chair over the leg of Henry and gave him a leg drop onto the chair.

In the penultimate match, Alberto Del Rio defended the WWE Championship against CM Punk. Howard Finkel was the special ring announcer for Punk. During the match, there were many reversals and counters to the two men's various finishers and submission holds. The match resulted in Punk winning via submission with Del Rio submitting to the Anaconda Vice. Punk celebrated with the crowd after the match. This would be the start of Punk's reign that would last for 434 days.

=== Main event ===
The main event saw John Cena and The Rock face The Miz and R-Truth. Throughout the match, Cena was targeted and was almost pinned many times. After R-Truth and John Cena took each other out of the match, The Rock performed a spinebuster followed by the People's Elbow to pin the Miz. After the match, The Rock performed the Rock Bottom on Cena.

== Reception ==
Dave Meltzer wrote that the main event had "The biggest big match feel in WWE since the John Cena vs. CM Punk encounter from Money in the Bank earlier that year". The event was released December 20, 2011, on DVD by WWE Home Video, and went on to be the highest selling pay-per-view on DVD that year behind WrestleMania.

== Aftermath ==
The following night on Raw, John Cena gave a promo regarding CM Punk becoming the new WWE Champion and how Cena and The Rock coexisted as a tag team. The Awesome Truth (The Miz and R-Truth) interrupted, and Cena told them that no one cared about them anymore, and they had to deal with each other. This led to Miz attacking R-Truth with a Skull-Crushing Finale, ending their stint as a tag team.

On the following episode of SmackDown, World Heavyweight Champion Mark Henry, with his left ankle injured, talked about his match with Big Show and mentioned that he wasn't medically cleared to compete. Big Show then appeared calling Henry the "World's Largest Loser" before knocking him out with a KO Punch. Daniel Bryan then cashed in his Money in the Bank contract on Henry to win the title, but SmackDown General Manager Theodore Long voided the cash-in and returned the title to Henry. Later that night, Bryan defeated Randy Orton, Cody Rhodes, and Wade Barrett in a fatal four-way match to become the number one contender for the title in a Steel Cage match on the November 29 episode, where Henry retained. Henry was subsequently scheduled to defend the title against Big Show at TLC: Tables, Ladders & Chairs as a chairs match.

== Results ==
No.	Results	Stipulations	Times
1^{D}	Santino Marella defeated Jinder Mahal by pinfall	Singles match	5:35
2	Dolph Ziggler (c) (with Vickie Guerrero) defeated John Morrison by pinfall	Singles match for the WWE United States Championship	10:42
3	Beth Phoenix (c) defeated Eve Torres by pinfall	Lumberjill match for the WWE Divas Championship	04:35
4	Team Barrett (Wade Barrett, Cody Rhodes, Dolph Ziggler, Hunico, and Jack Swagger) defeated Team Orton (Randy Orton, Kofi Kingston, Mason Ryan, Sheamus, and Sin Cara)	5-on-5 Survivor Series match	22:10
5	Big Show defeated Mark Henry (c) by disqualification	Singles match for the World Heavyweight Championship	13:04
6	CM Punk defeated Alberto Del Rio (c) (with Ricardo Rodriguez) by submission	Singles match for the WWE Championship	17:14
7	John Cena and The Rock defeated The Awesome Truth (The Miz and R-Truth) by pinfall	Tag team match	21:33
(c) / – the champion(s) heading into the match; D / – this was a dark match

- The lumberjills were: AJ, Aksana, Alicia Fox, Brie Bella, Kaitlyn, Kelly Kelly, Maxine, Natalya, Nikki Bella, Rosa Mendes, and Tamina.

=== Survivor Series match ===
Eliminated	Wrestler	Eliminated by	Method	Times
1	Dolph Ziggler	Randy Orton	RKO	1:32
2	Sin Cara	N/A	Unable to continue after suffering an injury	3:44
3	Mason Ryan	Cody Rhodes	Cross Rhodes	08:52
4	Kofi Kingston	Wade Barrett	Wasteland	14:06
5	Sheamus	N/A	Disqualification	18:30
6	Jack Swagger	Randy Orton	Pinned after Sheamus hit a Brogue Kick	19:33
7	Hunico	Randy Orton	RKO	21:38
8	Randy Orton	Wade Barrett	Wasteland	22:10
Survivor(s):	Wade Barrett and Cody Rhodes (Team Barrett)			22:10
