= Vengeance (2011) =

WWE pay-per-view event

- Promotional poster featuring Mark Henry
- Promotion: WWE
- Date: October 23, 2011
- City: San Antonio, Texas
- Venue: AT&T Center
- Attendance: 8,000
- Buy rate: 121,000
- Tagline: Vengeance Is Mine

Pay-per-view chronology
← Previous; Hell in a Cell	Next → Survivor Series

Vengeance chronology
← Previous; Vengeance: Night of Champions (2007)	Next → NXT TakeOver: Vengeance Day (2021)

The 2011 Vengeance was a professional wrestling pay-per-view (PPV) event produced by WWE. It was the eighth Vengeance and took place on October 23, 2011, at the AT&T Center in San Antonio, Texas. This was the first Vengeance held since 2007 and also the last until 2021 when it was rebranded as an NXT TakeOver event titled Vengeance Day.

Nine matches were contested at the event, including one on the pre-show. In the main event, Alberto Del Rio defeated John Cena in a Last Man Standing match to retain the WWE Championship. In other prominent matches, World Heavyweight Champion Mark Henry fought Big Show to a no contest, Randy Orton defeated Intercontinental Champion Cody Rhodes in a non-title match, and The Awesome Truth (The Miz and R-Truth) defeated CM Punk and Triple H.

As a result of the end of the first brand split in August, this year's Vengeance replaced the brand competition PPV event Bragging Rights. However, Vengeance was dropped the following year in favor of only holding one PPV during October, Hell in a Cell. The event garnered 121,000 PPV buys, down from 137,000 buys the previous year's Bragging Rights. This was also the first Vengeance held to be promoted under the company's shortened trade name of WWE, as following WrestleMania XXVII in April, the company ceased using its full name of World Wrestling Entertainment, although that remains the legal name of the company.

== Production ==
=== Background ===
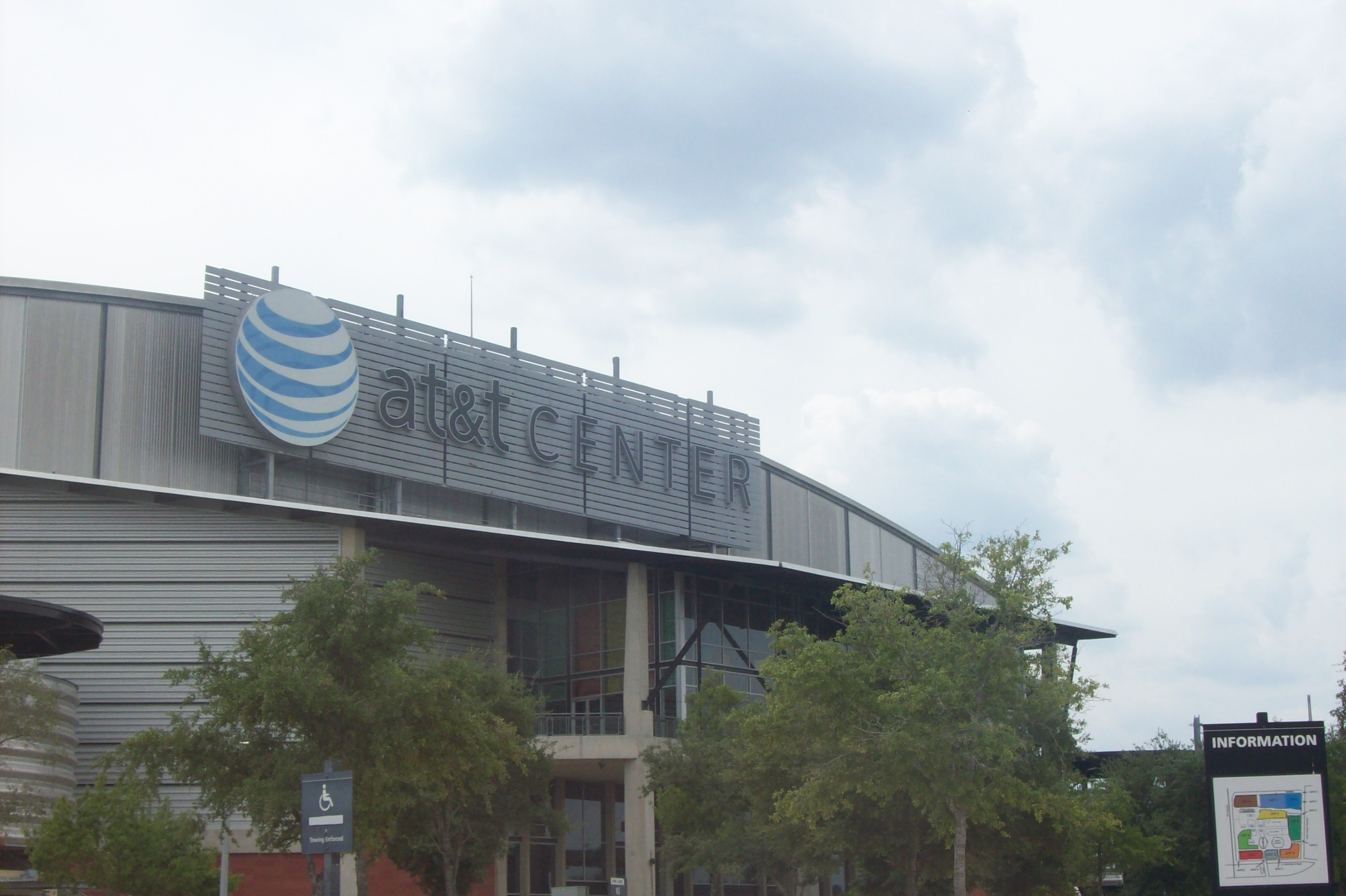
The eighth Vengeance, and the first since 2007, was held at the AT&T Center in San Antonio, Texas.

From 2001 to 2007, WWE ran an annual professional wrestling pay-per-view (PPV) event titled Vengeance. From that inaugural event until 2006, it was promoted solely as Vengeance, but in 2007, WWE promoted it under the title Vengeance: Night of Champions, which was simultaneously the seventh Vengeance and the inaugural Night of Champions. The 2007 event was the final Vengeance as WWE dropped it in 2008 in favor of continuing Night of Champions. Following the end of the first brand extension in August 2011, WWE canceled its brand competition PPV event titled Bragging Rights and reinstated Vengeance in its place. The eighth Vengeance was scheduled for October 23, 2011, at the AT&T Center in San Antonio, Texas.

This was the first Vengeance held to be promoted under the company's shortened trade name of WWE, as following WrestleMania XXVII in April, the company ceased using its full name of World Wrestling Entertainment, although that remains the legal name of the company.

=== Storylines ===
The event included matches that resulted from scripted storylines. Results were predetermined by WWE's writers, while storylines were produced on WWE's weekly television shows, Raw and SmackDown.

The main rivalry involved WWE Champion Alberto Del Rio against former champion John Cena for the WWE Championship. At Hell in a Cell earlier in the month, Cena lost his title to Del Rio after Cena was locked out of the steel cell while Del Rio pinned CM Punk in a Triple threat Hell in a Cell match. A week later, recently instated Interim General Manager of Raw John Laurinaitis booked Cena's rematch against Del Rio for Vengeance. On the October 17 episode of Raw, Cena won a tag team match with Jim Ross to defeat Del Rio and Michael Cole and as per the pre-match stipulation, he chose the match at Vengeance to be a Last Man Standing match.

Another rivalry was between CM Punk, Triple H, The Miz, and R-Truth. At Night of Champions, during the main event which was between the COO Triple H and Punk, The Miz and R-Truth interfered and attacked both competitors. The following night on Raw SuperShow, Triple H fired The Miz and R-Truth. At Hell in a Cell, The Miz and R-Truth attacked John Cena, CM Punk, Alberto Del Rio, the referee, and cameramen while the cell was still closed. The entire WWE roster came out to find a way into the cell. Eventually, they found pliers and got into the cell and Triple H attacked The Miz and R-Truth. On the October 10 episode of Raw SuperShow, Triple H was relieved from his duties of running Raw (though still COO) and Executive Vice President of Talent Relations John Laurinaitis was named Raw Interim General Manager and later that night made this match.

Another rivalry involved World Heavyweight Champion Mark Henry against Big Show for the World Heavyweight Championship. At Money in the Bank, Mark Henry injured Big Show via a steel chair when Henry crushed the chair on Big Show's fibula keeping him out of action for roughly four months. Afterwards, Henry defeated Randy Orton at Night of Champions to claim the World Heavyweight Championship for the first time in his career, and defeated Orton once more at Hell in a Cell to retain his title. On the episode of SmackDown after Hell in a Cell, Big Show returned and began to attack Mark Henry demanding a title match for Henry's title. As Big Show was about to crush Henry's leg with a steel chair, SmackDown General Manager Theodore Long said that if Big Show did not crush Henry's leg, he would get his title match. Big Show decided to give Henry a chair shot to the back, fearing that if he crushed Henry's leg, he would not get his World Heavyweight Championship match.

Another rivalry involved Randy Orton and Intercontinental Champion Cody Rhodes. Earlier in the month at Hell in a Cell, Randy Orton lost his World Heavyweight Championship rematch in a Hell in a Cell match against Mark Henry, while Cody Rhodes brought back the classic Intercontinental Championship title belt and then successfully defended it in an impromptu match against John Morrison. Rhodes would cost Randy Orton another World Heavyweight Championship match on the October 7 episode of SmackDown. The next week on SmackDown, Randy Orton would get vengeance against Rhodes when he picked up a pinfall victory over Rhodes. On the October 17 episode of Raw SuperShow, Cody Rhodes picked up a pinfall victory over Orton after interference from Mark Henry. It was then announced that Randy Orton would face Rhodes at Vengeance in a non-title rubber match.

The only rivalry on the Divas card was between Eve Torres and Beth Phoenix over the Divas Championship. On the October 17 episode of Raw SuperShow, Torres was announced as the number one contender for the Divas Championship. On the following episode of SmackDown, Torres interrupted Phoenix talking about the match, pushed her over and showed her 'ranty panties'. The same night of their match, Kelly Kelly, a storyline ally of Torres, was being interviewed on a WWE.com exclusive but was attacked by Phoenix and Natalya, with Torres making the save. Therefore, Interim General Manager of Raw John Laurinaitis announced that Kelly Kelly and Natalya would be banned from ringside for the match at the event

== Event ==
=== Pre-Show ===
On the pre-show, Wade Barrett defeated Daniel Bryan. This would be their last singles match against one another for 2 years, however they did compete as rivals in tag matches on SmackDown, as well as an Elimination Chamber against one other in 2012.

=== Preliminary matches ===
The first match saw Air Boom (Evan Bourne and Kofi Kingston) defending the WWE Tag Team Championship against Dolph Ziggler and Jack Swagger. The match ended when Bourne pinned Ziggler after Air Bourne to retain the titles.

Next, Dolph Ziggler defended the United States Championship against Zack Ryder. Air Boom were at ringside in the corner of Zack Ryder. Bourne and Kingston interfered by throwing Dolph Ziggler back in the ring when he went to the outside. Because of this, they were ejected from ringside. In the end, Ziggler pinned Ryder after a superkick.

After that, Eve challenged Beth Phoenix for the Divas Championship with the stipulation of Kelly Kelly and Natalya being banned from Ringside. Phoenix executed the Glam Slam on Eve and then pinned her for the victory.

Next, Christian faced Sheamus. The match came to an end after Christian tried to execute a Spear on Sheamus, who countered and executed a Brogue Kick on Christian to win the match.

Afterwards, The Miz and R-Truth took on Triple H and CM Punk. Triple H and Punk controlled the match until Kevin Nash attacked Triple H whilst the referee was distracted. Miz and Truth then executed a Shut Up/Skull Crushing Finale combination on Punk, with Miz pinning Punk to win the match.

In the sixth match, Randy Orton fought Intercontinental Champion Cody Rhodes. To finish the match, Rhodes executed Cross Rhodes on Orton for a near-fall, followed by Rhodes attempting an RKO on Orton, who countered into a dropkick on Rhodes. Orton executed an RKO of his own on Rhodes, pinning Rhodes to win the match.

The penultimate match pitted the Big Show against Mark Henry for the World Heavyweight Championship. After Henry executed a superplex on Big Show, the wrestling ring collapsed, two rows of ropes fell, and one ring post jutted out. The referee ruled the match a No Contest, with Henry retaining the championship. After the match, medical staff brought a stretcher out but neither Big Show nor Henry could fit on it. Then, a flatbed truck was driven to the ring, and the medical staff put Big Show on it. They drove away, but not before general managers John Laurinaitis and Theodore Long appeared. Henry was then assisted out of the AT&T Center, at one point punching an EMT. Afterwards, Laurinaitis confirmed the main event would still happen, despite the damaged ring.

=== Main event ===
The main event was a Last Man Standing match between John Cena and Alberto Del Rio for the WWE Championship, with the ring still in a collapsed state from the previous bout. Cena and Del Rio gained control over each other throughout the match. When Del Rio climbed the V on the stage, Cena threw him through a table. The Miz and R-Truth attacked Cena, with Miz executing a Skull Crushing Finale on Cena and R-Truth executing a Shut Up on Cena. When Cena stood, Del Rio hit Cena with the WWE championship belt. Cena could not answer the ten count, and Del Rio retained the WWE Championship.

== Aftermath ==
On the following episode of Raw, John Cena decided to face The Miz and R-Truth, who cost him the WWE Championship match at Vengeance, with Zack Ryder as his partner. However, Miz and R-Truth ambushed Ryder before the match, in which they beat Cena down. Later, it was announced that Miz and R-Truth would face Cena and a partner of his choosing at Survivor Series, with Cena picking The Rock.

Due to the finish of their match at Vengeance, Mark Henry and Big Show were scheduled for another World Heavyweight Championship match at Survivor Series, with a reinforced ring being set up.

Following this event, WWE again discontinued Vengeance, this time until 2021—during this hiatus, the brand extension returned in 2016. In 2021, WWE revived the PPV for their NXT brand as a TakeOver event titled Vengeance Day, the name of which was also a play on its Valentine's Day scheduling. The TakeOver series was discontinued after 2021, but Vengeance Day has continued as an annual NXT event.

== Results ==
No.	Results	Stipulations	Times
1^{D}	Wade Barrett defeated Daniel Bryan by pinfall	Singles match	4:57
2	Air Boom (Evan Bourne and Kofi Kingston) (c) defeated Dolph Ziggler and Jack Swagger (with Vickie Guerrero) by pinfall	Tag team match for the WWE Tag Team Championship	13:23
3	Dolph Ziggler (c) (with Vickie Guerrero and Jack Swagger) defeated Zack Ryder by pinfall	Singles match for the WWE United States Championship	6:02
4	Beth Phoenix (c) defeated Eve Torres by pinfall	Singles match for the WWE Divas Championship Kelly Kelly & Natalya were banned from ringside	7:18
5	Sheamus defeated Christian by pinfall	Singles match	10:38
6	Awesome Truth (The Miz and R-Truth) defeated Triple H and CM Punk by pinfall	Tag team match	15:24
7	Randy Orton defeated Cody Rhodes by pinfall	Singles match	12:14
8	Mark Henry (c) vs. Big Show ended in a no contest	Singles match for the World Heavyweight Championship	13:00
9	Alberto Del Rio (c) (with Ricardo Rodriguez) defeated John Cena	Last Man Standing match for the WWE Championship	26:58
(c) / – the champion(s) heading into the match; D / – this was a dark match
