= NXT Vengeance Day (2023) =

WWE premium live event

- Promotional poster featuring Grayson Waller, Bron Breakker, Jacy Jayne, Roxanne Perez, and Gigi Dolin
- Promotion: WWE
- Brand: NXT
- Date: February 4, 2023
- City: Charlotte, North Carolina
- Venue: Spectrum Center
- Attendance: 5,719

WWE event chronology
| ← Previous; Royal Rumble | Next → Elimination Chamber |

Vengeance Day chronology
| ← Previous; 2022 | Next → 2024 |

NXT major events chronology
| ← Previous; Deadline | Next → Stand & Deliver |

The 2023 NXT Vengeance Day was a professional wrestling premium live event (PLE) produced by WWE, held exclusively for wrestlers from the promotion's developmental brand, NXT. It was NXT's third annual Vengeance Day and WWE's 11th Vengeance overall. The event took place on Saturday, February 4, 2023, at the Spectrum Center in Charlotte, North Carolina. This was NXT's first PLE to be held in North Carolina and the second Vengeance held at this venue, after the 2006 event when it was known as Charlotte Bobcats Arena (renamed in 2016).

Unlike the previous year's event, which was held as a television special of NXT, the 2023 event was held as a PLE, which made it the first Vengeance Day to be branded as a "premium live event", a term the company introduced at the start of 2022 to refer to its events airing on traditional pay-per-view and via WWE's livestreaming platforms. In addition to the WWE Network in most international markets, this was the first Vengeance Day to livestream on Peacock in the United States, SonyLIV in India, Disney+ Hotstar in Indonesia, and Disney+ in the Philippines, and was subsequently NXT's first PLE on Binge in Australia. This also marked NXT's first standalone PLE to be held outside of the U.S. state of Florida since NXT TakeOver: Portland in February 2020, and NXT's second PLE overall held outside of Florida since then, after the WrestleMania 38 week event, NXT Stand & Deliver in April 2022.

Six matches were contested at the event. In the main event, Bron Breakker defeated Grayson Waller in a Steel Cage match to retain the NXT Championship. In other prominent matches, Gallus (Mark Coffey and Wolfgang) defeated defending champions The New Day (Kofi Kingston and Xavier Woods), Pretty Deadly (Elton Prince and Kit Wilson), and Chase University (Andre Chase and Duke Hudson) in a fatal four-way tag team match to win the NXT Tag Team Championship, and Roxanne Perez defeated Gigi Dolin and Jacy Jayne in a triple threat match to retain the NXT Women's Championship. The event also saw the return of Dabba-Kato, formerly known as Commander Azeez.

== Production ==
=== Background ===
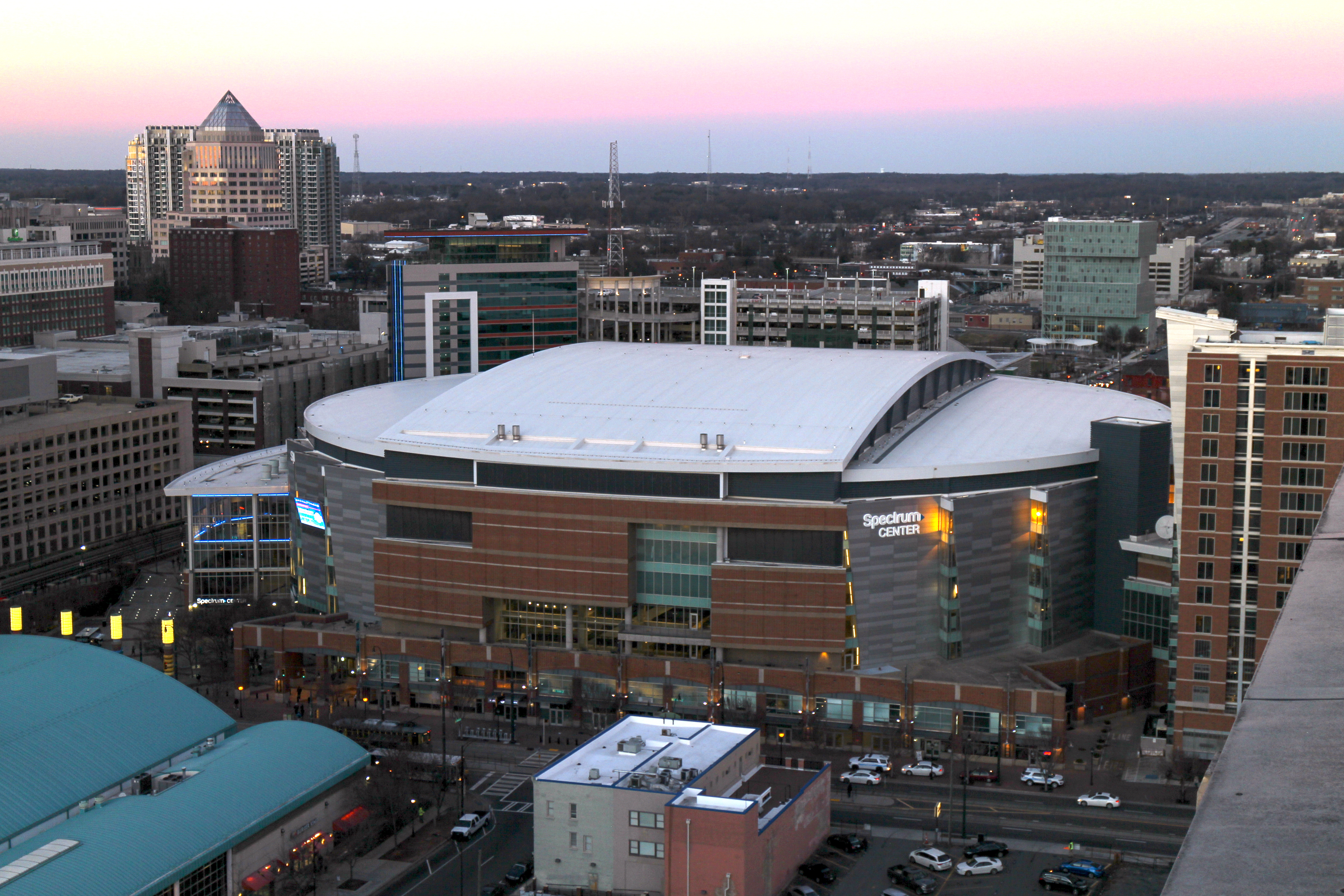
NXT's third annual Vengeance Day, and 11th Vengeance overall, was the second time for the event to be held at the Spectrum Center in Charlotte, North Carolina, after 2006.

Vengeance was originally established as a professional wrestling pay-per-view (PPV) event for WWE in 2001 and it was held annually until 2007, followed by one event in 2011. Since its revival in 2021, it has been held annually in February for WWE's developmental brand NXT under the title NXT Vengeance Day, a reference to the event taking place on or around Valentine's Day. On December 8, 2022, NXT's third Vengeance Day event, and WWE's 11th Vengeance overall, was announced to be held on Saturday, February 4, 2023, at the Spectrum Center in Charlotte, North Carolina, marking NXT's first major event to be held in North Carolina and the second Vengeance event held at this venue, after the 2006 event when it was known as Charlotte Bobcats Arena (renamed in 2016). Tickets went on sale on December 16, 2022.

Unlike the 2022 event, which was held as a television special of NXT, the 2023 Vengeance Day was a premium live event (PLE), subsequently being the first Vengeance to be branded as a PLE, a term the company introduced on January 1, 2022, to refer to its events that are available on PPV and via livestreaming. This also marked NXT's first standalone PLE to be held outside of the U.S. state of Florida since NXT TakeOver: Portland in February 2020, just before the onset of the COVID-19 pandemic, and NXT's second overall PLE held outside of Florida since then, after the WrestleMania 38 week event, NXT Stand & Deliver in April 2022.

=== Broadcast outlets ===
As a result of WWE no longer broadcasting NXT's PLEs on traditional PPV as of 2022, the 2023 Vengeance Day aired on WWE's livestreaming platforms. These included Peacock in the United States, SonyLIV in India, Disney+ Hotstar in Indonesia, Disney+ in the Philippines, Binge in Australia, and the WWE Network everywhere else. This marked the first Vengeance to air on SonyLIV, Peacock, Disney+ Hotstar, and Disney+, and subsequently NXT's first PLE to livestream on Binge, after those countries' respective versions of the WWE Network merged under those services in February 2021, April 2021, January 2022, November 2022, and January 2023, respectively.

=== Storylines ===
The card included matches that resulted from scripted storylines. Results were predetermined by WWE's writers on the NXT brand, while storylines were produced on the weekly television program, NXT, and the supplementary online streaming show, Level Up.

On the January 3 episode of NXT, a brawl broke out among many of the female wrestlers. Later that night, NXT Women's Champion Roxanne Perez announced that a battle royal would occur at NXT: New Year's Evil to determine the number one contender for her title at Vengeance Day. At New Year's Evil, Toxic Attraction members Gigi Dolin and Jacy Jayne were declared the co-winners of the battle royal after they simultaneously eliminated each other. It was then decided that Perez would defend the title in a triple threat match against Dolin and Jayne at Vengeance Day.

At NXT: New Year's Evil, Bron Breakker defended the NXT Championship against men's Iron Survivor Challenge winner Grayson Waller. During the match, Waller stood on the middle rope to perform a move, but the rope broke, causing him to fall out of the ring. Waller was unable to make it back in the ring in time to beat the referee's 10 count, thus Breakker retained by countout. Later that night, NXT lead official Shawn Michaels announced that due to the issues with the ropes, a rematch would occur at Vengeance Day, this time as a Steel Cage match.

After Wes Lee's successful NXT North American Championship defense on the November 22, 2022, episode of NXT, Dijak made his return to NXT and attacked Lee from behind—Dijak previously performed in NXT as Dominik Dijakovic before being promoted to Raw as T-Bar. At NXT: New Year's Evil, Dijak defeated Tony D'Angelo to become the number one contender to Lee's title and the match was scheduled for Vengeance Day.

At NXT Deadline, SmackDown's The New Day (Kofi Kingston and Xavier Woods) defeated Pretty Deadly (Elton Prince and Kit Wilson) to win the NXT Tag Team Championship. At NXT: New Year's Evil, the returning Gallus (Mark Coffey and Wolfgang) won a gauntlet match to become the number one contenders for the NXT Tag Team Championship, lastly eliminating Pretty Deadly. The following week, Pretty Deadly interrupted The New Day as they spoke in the ring, followed by Gallus, and then a brawl started between the three teams, which led to Pretty Deadly being added to the match, turning it into a triple threat tag team match. However, on the January 24 episode of NXT, The New Day announced a tag team invitational match between The Dyad (Jagger Reid and Rip Fowler), Chase University (Andre Chase and Duke Hudson), and the team of Malik Blade and Edris Enofé for the following week's episode, where the winners would be added to the title match, which was won by Chase University.

On the December 20, 2022, episode of NXT, Apollo Crews made his first appearance since his NXT Championship loss at NXT Deadline. He talked about not staying out of title contention when Carmelo Hayes interrupted. After the two traded barbs, they agreed to a match at a future date. The following week, Hayes and Trick Williams promised to defeat Crews and Axiom, respectively, on the January 3, 2023, episode, which they subsequently did. At NXT: New Year's Evil, Axiom and Crews agreed to take on Hayes and Williams the following week, where Axiom and Crews won when Crews pinned Hayes. On the January 24 episode, during a segment in a barbershop, Crews challenged Hayes to a two out of three falls match at Vengeance Day, which was made official.

== Event ==
Other on-screen personnel
| Role: | Name: |
|---|---|
| Commentators | Vic Joseph |
| Commentators | Booker T |
| Spanish commentators | Marcelo Rodríguez |
| Spanish commentators | Jerry Soto |
| Ring announcer | Alicia Taylor |
| Referees | Adrian Butler |
| Referees | Chip Danning |
| Referees | Dallas Irvin |
| Referees | Derek Sanders |
| Referees | Joey Gonzalez |
| Interviewer | McKenzie Mitchell |
| Pre-show panel | Sam Roberts |
| Pre-show panel | Matt Camp |

=== Preliminary matches ===
The PLE began with Wes Lee defending the NXT North American Championship against Dijak. In the closing moments, Dijak attempted a moonsault, but Tony D'Angelo and Channing "Stacks" Lorenzo appeared, and took the bullet for Lee. Lee took advantage to perform the Cardiac Kick on Dijak to retain the title.

In the next match, Kayden Carter and Katana Chance defended the NXT Women's Tag Team Championship against Fallon Henley and Kiana James (accompanied by Josh Briggs and Brooks Jensen). In the closing stages, as Katana and Kayden were preparing for their Neckbreaker/450° splash combination, Henley countered it into a version of the schoolgirl pin, with James holding Carter's legs outside the ring to keep her pinned and become the new NXT Women's Tag Team Champions. This win made Henley and James the first team to win the NXT Women's Tag Team Championship on the main card of an NXT premium live event.

Next, Apollo Crews took on Carmelo Hayes (accompanied by Trick Williams) in a two out of three falls match. Carmelo secured the first fall after a crossface chickenwing, forcing Apollo to submit. The second fall came after the returning Dabba-Kato distracted Apollo, allowing Hayes to perform the Nothing But Net to score a sweeping 2-0 win. After the match, Kato acted like he was helping Apollo to his feet, but instead dragged him into a headbutt and performed the Sky High onto a steel chair.

In the fourth match, The New Day (Kofi Kingston and Xavier Woods) defended the NXT Tag Team Championship against Pretty Deadly (Kit Wilson and Elton Prince), Gallus (Mark Coffey and Wolfgang), and Chase University (Andre Chase and Duke Hudson) (accompanied by Thea Hail) in a fatal four-way tag team match. In the closing moments, with all four teams taken out, Coffey and Wolfgang performed a forearm assisted Emerald Flowsion combination to pin Woods down and become the new NXT Tag Team Champions.

In the penultimate match, Roxanne Perez defended the NXT Women's Championship against Toxic Attraction's Gigi Dolin and Jacy Jayne in a triple threat match. In the end, Dolin was thrown through a table and Jayne suffered a top-rope Pop Rocks to secure the win for Perez.

=== Main event ===
In the main event, Bron Breakker defended the NXT Championship against Grayson Waller in a Steel Cage match. While Breakker made his entrance, he broke a logo of Waller's talk show on a poster. Before the match, Waller slammed the cage door into Breakker, who did the same to Waller, with the match starting afterwards. Waller performed an elbow drop on Breakker for a nearfall. Waller then tied Breakker in the ropes and speared him. Breakker then untangled himself. Waller performed an Ace Crusher on Breakker for a nearfall. In the closing moments, Waller went to the top of the cage, but Breakker met him up there and performed a superplex. Breakker followed up with a Spear, and then a second Spear on Waller to retain the title. After the match, Carmelo Hayes and Trick Williams appeared. Hayes and Breakker stared each other down as the event ended.

== Reception ==
Dave Meltzer rated Wes Lee vs. Dijak 4.5 stars, the highest of the night. The main event received 3.25 stars, with the 2/3 falls match receiving the same rating. The NXT Women's Championship match received 3 stars, while the NXT Tag Team Championship match received 3.5 stars. Finally, the NXT Women's Tag Team Championship match received 2.25 stars, the lowest of the night.

== Aftermath ==
Carmelo Hayes (with Trick Williams) opened the following episode of NXT to talk about his win at Vengeance Day, and turned his attention to Bron Breakker and the NXT Championship. Over the coming weeks, he continued to set his sights on the title until a title match between Breakker and Hayes was made official for NXT Stand & Deliver.

Also on NXT, new NXT Women's Tag Team Champions Fallon Henley and Kiana James argued about the way they won at Vengeance Day before they walked into a party to celebrate their win, hosted by Josh Briggs and Brooks Jensen.

During the party, Pretty Deadly (Kit Wilson and Elton Prince) and Chase University (Andre Chase and Duke Hudson) declared for a match later that night, where Pretty Deadly won. After the match, they were confronted by Gallus (Mark Coffey and Wolfgang). This sparked a feud between the two teams, which led to a title match on the March 14 episode, where Gallus retained.

Footage was shown of Grayson Waller storming into Shawn Michaels' office after Vengeance Day, resulting in him being suspended for a week. After more confrontations, on the February 21 episode of NXT, Waller told Michaels to meet him face-to-face at NXT: Roadblock on March 7, which was confirmed the following week.

On the February 21 episode of NXT, Dabba-Kato explained that he turned on Apollo Crews at Vengeance Day because he blamed him for leaving Kato behind when Crews returned to NXT in June 2021. The two would have a match on the March 14 episode, where Kato was victorious.

After costing Dijak his NXT North American Championship match at Vengeance Day, Tony D'Angelo continued feuding with Dijak. On the February 21 episode, D'Angelo challenged Dijak to a Jailhouse Street Fight for NXT: Roadblock, which Dijak accepted a week later.

After they failed to defeat Roxanne Perez for the NXT Women's Championship, Gigi Dolin and Jacy Jayne were guests on Bayley's talk show, "Ding Dong, Hello!". Dolin and Jayne talked about whether they should go for the WWE Women's Tag Team Championship on the main roster or go their separate ways. After it looked like Dolin and Jayne would stay together, Jayne attacked Dolin with a superkick, breaking up Toxic Attraction in the process. Over the next few weeks, Jayne and Dolin talked about their breakup and on the February 28 episode, a match between the two was scheduled for Roadblock.

== Results ==
| No. | Results | Stipulations | Times |
|---|---|---|---|
| 1 | Wes Lee (c) defeated Dijak by pinfall | Singles match for the NXT North American Championship | 17:01 |
| 2 | Fallon Henley and Kiana James (with Josh Briggs and Brooks Jensen) defeated Katana Chance and Kayden Carter (c) by pinfall | Tag team match for the NXT Women's Tag Team Championship | 9:20 |
| 3 | Carmelo Hayes (with Trick Williams) defeated Apollo Crews by 2–0 | Two out of three falls match | 23:31 |
| 4 | Gallus (Mark Coffey and Wolfgang) defeated The New Day (Kofi Kingston and Xavier Woods) (c), Pretty Deadly (Elton Prince and Kit Wilson), and Chase University (Andre Chase and Duke Hudson) (with Thea Hail) by pinfall | Fatal four-way tag team match for the NXT Tag Team Championship | 16:46 |
| 5 | Roxanne Perez (c) defeated Gigi Dolin and Jacy Jayne by pinfall | Triple threat match for the NXT Women's Championship | 14:42 |
| 6 | Bron Breakker (c) defeated Grayson Waller by pinfall | Steel Cage match for the NXT Championship; The match could only be won by pinfall or submission. | 14:25 |
(c) / – the champion(s) heading into the match
