= NXT Stand & Deliver =

WWE livestreaming event series

Stand & Deliver
- NXT Stand & Deliver 2026 logo
- Promotion: WWE
- Brands: NXT (2021–present); NXT UK (2021)
- Other name(s): NXT TakeOver: Stand & Deliver (2021); NXT Stand & Deliver (2022–2024)
- First event: NXT TakeOver: Stand & Deliver

Stand & Deliver is a professional wrestling event produced by WWE, a Connecticut-based professional wrestling promotion. Established in 2021, it is held for the promotion's developmental brand NXT. It is considered NXT's biggest event of the year and was originally held as part of WrestleMania week until 2026. The inaugural two-night event was broadcast through multiple outlets, with the first night airing as a television special on the USA Network and the second night on pay-per-view with both nights also airing through WWE's livestreaming services. Beginning with the 2022 event, it has been held as a one-day livestreaming event.

The inaugural Stand & Deliver was originally held under the NXT TakeOver series. In September 2021, NXT was rebranded and reverted to being WWE's developmental brand and the TakeOver series was discontinued; however, Stand & Deliver continued on as an annual event for NXT. While the original event was held mid-week across two nights the week of WrestleMania, it was reduced to one day beginning with the second event, as well as being held during the day of the first night of WrestleMania until 2026, when it was split off from WrestleMania week altogether. The inaugural event also featured wrestlers from NXT's former sub-brand, NXT UK.

== History ==
NXT TakeOver was a series of periodic professional wrestling events produced by WWE for the company's NXT brand. The 34th TakeOver event was held as NXT TakeOver: Stand & Deliver and was the only TakeOver to be held across two nights. The event was held on April 7 and 8, 2021, during WrestleMania 37 week. It aired on traditional pay-per-view (PPV) worldwide and the WWE Network in international markets, and was WWE's first live in-ring event to air on Peacock after the American version of the WWE Network had shut down on April 4 that year, following its merger under Peacock. The first night also aired as a television special on the USA Network. Due to the COVID-19 pandemic, the event was held at the Capitol Wrestling Center within the WWE Performance Center in Orlando, Florida.

In September 2021, the NXT brand went through a restructuring, reverting to a developmental brand for WWE. The Capitol Wrestling Center name was also dropped with NXT's events just being promoted as held at the Performance Center. The TakeOver series was also subsequently discontinued.

On January 24, 2022, it was confirmed that Stand & Deliver would continue on as its own event for NXT with a second Stand & Deliver event announced to be held during WrestleMania 38 weekend, thus establishing Stand & Deliver as NXT's annual event held during WrestleMania week. This second Stand & Deliver was scheduled to be held as a one-day event at the American Airlines Center in Dallas, Texas on April 2, 2022, the same day as WrestleMania 38 Night 1. Due to this, Stand & Deliver had a special start time of 1pm Eastern Time. This was the first NXT event to be held outside of Florida since the start of the COVID-19 pandemic in March 2020, and subsequently the first NXT event to be held outside of NXT's home arenas—Full Sail University (former) and the WWE Performance Center (current)—since NXT TakeOver: Portland in February 2020.

On November 3, 2022, WWE announced that the third Stand & Deliver would be held on April 1, 2023, during the day of WrestleMania 39 Night 1. It aired live from the Crypto.com Arena in Los Angeles, California. This in turn established Stand & Deliver to be held annually during the day of WrestleMania Night 1.

== Events ==
#	Event	Date	City	Venue	Main event	Ref.
1	NXT TakeOver: Stand & Deliver	April 7, 2021	Orlando, Florida	Capitol Wrestling Center at WWE Performance Center	Night 1: Io Shirai (c) vs. Raquel González for the NXT Women's Championship	
1	NXT TakeOver: Stand & Deliver	April 8, 2021	Orlando, Florida	Capitol Wrestling Center at WWE Performance Center	Night 2: Adam Cole vs. Kyle O'Reilly in an Unsanctioned match	
2	NXT Stand & Deliver (2022)	April 2, 2022	Dallas, Texas	American Airlines Center	Dolph Ziggler (c) vs. Bron Breakker for the NXT Championship	
3	NXT Stand & Deliver (2023)	April 1, 2023	Los Angeles, California	Crypto.com Arena	Bron Breakker (c) vs. Carmelo Hayes for the NXT Championship	
4	NXT Stand & Deliver (2024)	April 6, 2024	Philadelphia, Pennsylvania	Wells Fargo Center	Trick Williams vs. Carmelo Hayes	
5	Stand & Deliver (2025)	April 19, 2025	Paradise, Nevada	T-Mobile Arena	Oba Femi (c) vs. Trick Williams vs. Je'Von Evans for the NXT Championship	
6	NXT Stand & Deliver (2026)	April 4, 2026	Chesterfield, Missouri	The Factory at The District	Joe Hendry (c) vs. Ricky Saints vs. Ethan Page vs. Tony D'Angelo in a fatal four-way match for the NXT Championship	
7	NXT Stand & Deliver (2027)	April 2027	New York City, New York	The Theater at Madison Square Garden		
(c) – refers to the champion(s) going into the match

== See also ==
- List of WWE pay-per-view and livestreaming supercards
