= List of NXT Cruiserweight Champions =

Listing of professional wrestling champions for the NXT Cruiserweight Championship

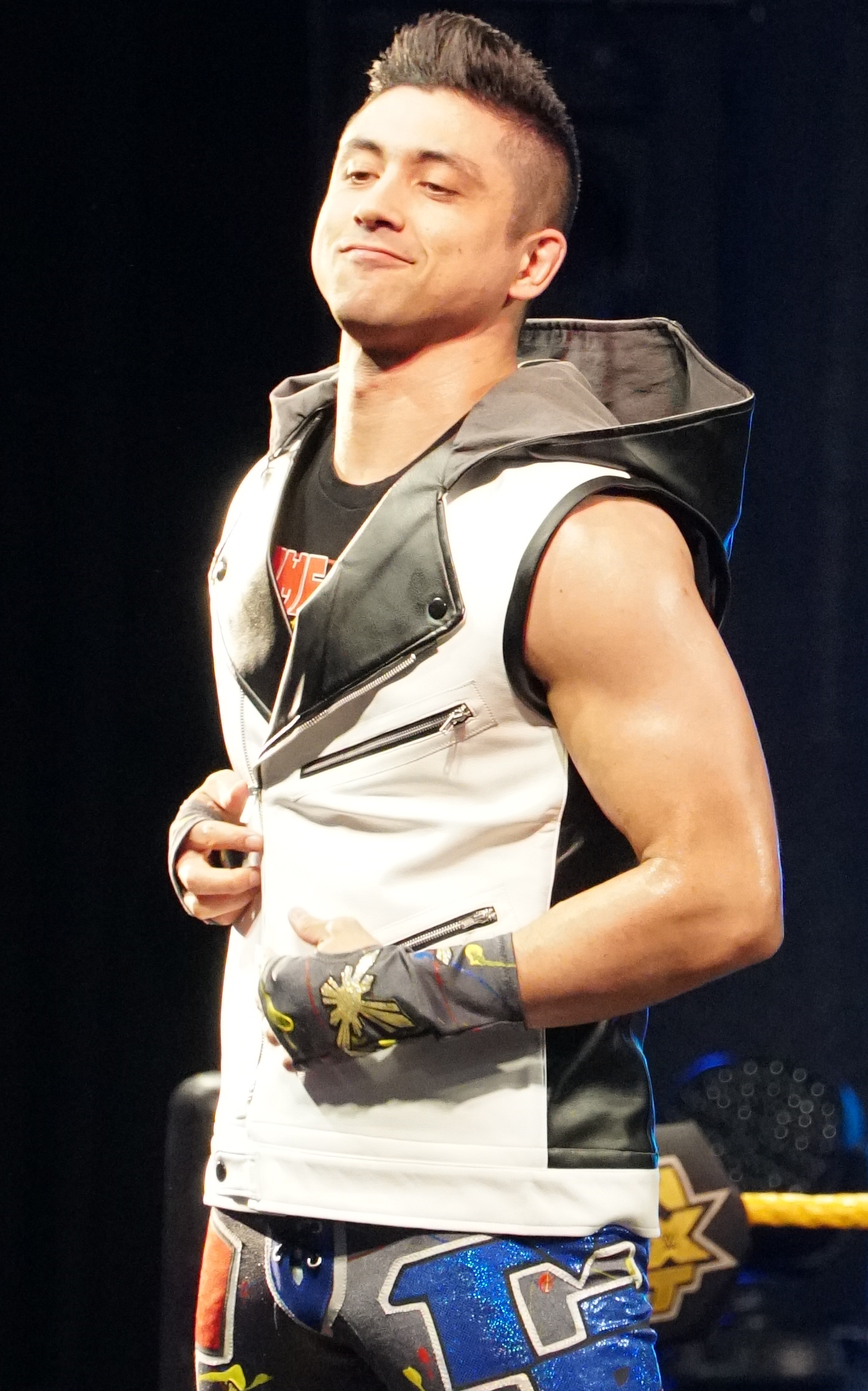
Inaugural champion T. J. Perkins

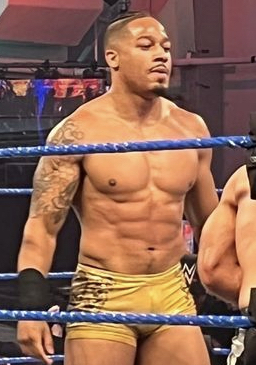
Final champion Carmelo Hayes

The NXT Cruiserweight Championship (originally known as the WWE Cruiserweight Championship from 2016 to 2019) is a former professional wrestling championship that was created and promoted by the American promotion WWE. Before its retirement, it was defended on the NXT, NXT UK, and 205 Live brands. It was contested exclusively for wrestlers with a maximum bill weight of 205 lb (93 kg), referred to as cruiserweights. During its tenure, it was the only WWE championship with a weight limit.

Established as the WWE Cruiserweight Championship, the title was originally part of the Raw brand and defended on Monday Night Raw until the premiere of 205 Live, after which, it was defended on both shows until WrestleMania 34. Following this event, 205 Live became its own brand and the title became exclusive to 205 Live until October 2019 when it began to be defended on NXT. The title was subsequently renamed to NXT Cruiserweight Championship. In January 2020, the title was extended to NXT's sister brand NXT UK.

The championship was generally contested in professional wrestling matches, in which participants executed scripted finishes rather than contend in direct competition. The inaugural champion was T. J. Perkins, who was awarded the title for winning the Cruiserweight Classic on September 14, 2016. Carmelo Hayes is recognized as the final champion. He defeated Roderick Strong on the special New Year's Evil episode of NXT 2.0 on January 4, 2022, to unify the title with the NXT North American Championship; the Cruiserweight Championship was immediately retired following his win.

Throughout the championship's short history, there were 20 reigns between 18 champions and one vacancy. The oldest champion was Roderick Strong, winning the title at 38 years old, while the youngest champion was Lio Rush when he won it at 24. Neville and Enzo Amore were tied for the most reigns at two. Jordan Devlin's sole reign was the longest reign at 439 days, while final champion Carmelo Hayes' singular reign was the shortest at less than a minute as the title was immediately retired after he won it in a title unification match.

== Reigns ==
=== Names ===
Name	Years
WWE Cruiserweight Championship	September 14, 2016 – October 2, 2019
NXT Cruiserweight Championship	October 2, 2019 – January 4, 2022
Unified NXT North American Championship	January 4, 2022

=== Reigns ===
Key
No.	Overall reign number
Reign	Reign number for the specific champion
Days	Number of days held
Days recog.	Number of days held recognized by the promotion
<1	Reign lasted less than a day

No.	Champion	Championship change			Reign statistics			Notes	Ref.
No.	Champion	Date	Event	Location	Reign	Days	Days recog.	Notes	Ref.
WWE: Raw
1	T. J. Perkins	September 14, 2016	Cruiserweight Classic Finale	Winter Park, FL	1	46	45	Before the finale of the Cruiserweight Classic, WWE Chief Operating Officer Triple H revealed that the winner would also win the inaugural WWE Cruiserweight Championship for WWE's revived cruiserweight division exclusive to the Raw brand. T. J. Perkins defeated Gran Metalik in the tournament final to become the inaugural champion.	
2	The Brian Kendrick	October 30, 2016	Hell in a Cell	Boston, MA	1	30	30		
3	Rich Swann	November 29, 2016	205 Live	Columbia, SC	1	61	60	This was the inaugural episode of 205 Live.	
4	Neville	January 29, 2017	Royal Rumble	San Antonio, TX	1	197	196		
5	Akira Tozawa	August 14, 2017	Raw	Boston, MA	1	6	5		
6	Neville	August 20, 2017	SummerSlam; Kickoff	Brooklyn, NY	2	35	35		
7	Enzo Amore	September 24, 2017	No Mercy	Los Angeles, CA	1	15	15		
8	Kalisto	October 9, 2017	Raw	Indianapolis, IN	1	13	12	This was a lumberjack match.	
9	Enzo Amore	October 22, 2017	TLC: Tables, Ladders & Chairs	Minneapolis, MN	2	93	92		
—	Vacated	January 23, 2018	—	—	—	—	—	Vacated due to Enzo Amore's release from WWE one day after it was confirmed that Amore was under investigation for an alleged sexual assault that was reported to the police in October 2017.	
10	Cedric Alexander	April 8, 2018	WrestleMania 34; Kickoff	New Orleans, LA	1	181	180	Defeated Mustafa Ali in a tournament final to win the vacant championship. The title then became exclusive to the 205 Live brand.	
WWE: 205 Live
11	Buddy Murphy	October 6, 2018	Super Show-Down	Melbourne, Australia	1	183	183		
12	Tony Nese	April 7, 2019	WrestleMania 35; Kickoff	East Rutherford, NJ	1	77	77		
13	Drew Gulak	June 23, 2019	Stomping Grounds; Kickoff	Tacoma, WA	1	108	108	This was a triple threat match also involving Akira Tozawa, whom Gulak pinned. In October 2019, the title became shared between 205 Live and NXT, and it was renamed the NXT Cruiserweight Championship.	
WWE: NXT and 205 Live
14	Lio Rush	October 9, 2019	NXT	Winter Park, FL	1	63	63		
15	Angel Garza	December 11, 2019	NXT	Winter Park, FL	1	45	44		
16	Jordan Devlin	January 25, 2020	Worlds Collide	Houston, TX	1	439	438	This was a fatal four-way match also involving Travis Banks and Isaiah "Swerve" Scott, whom Devlin pinned. With Devlin's win, the title was extended to the NXT UK brand. Devlin's reign ended on April 8, 2021 at TakeOver: Stand & Deliver Night 2, when Santos Escobar defeated him to determine the undisputed champion. From May 27, 2020 (aired June 3) until April 8, 2021, both Devlin and Escobar were recognized as champion.	
WWE: NXT, NXT UK, and 205 Live
17	El Hijo del Fantasma/Santos Escobar	May 27, 2020	NXT	Winter Park, FL	1	321	313	Due to a travel ban as a result of the COVID-19 pandemic, an interim champion was crowned in the United States until Jordan Devlin could return; Devlin, who resided in the United Kingdom, still defended the title on NXT UK while the U.S.-based interim champion defended the title on NXT. Fantasma defeated Drake Maverick in the finals of an eight-man tournament to become the interim champion in the U.S. WWE recognizes his reign as beginning on June 3, 2020, when the episode aired on tape delay. On the June 10 episode, Fantasma unmasked and changed his ring name to Santos Escobar. After Devlin made his return to the U.S. the following year, Escobar defeated Devlin in a ladder match at TakeOver: Stand & Deliver Night 2 on April 8, 2021 to determine the undisputed champion (recognized as a continuation of his reign as interim champion).	
18	Kushida	April 13, 2021	NXT	Orlando, FL	1	161	160		
19	Roderick Strong	September 21, 2021	NXT 2.0	Orlando, FL	1	105	105		
20	Carmelo Hayes	January 4, 2022	NXT 2.0: New Year's Evil	Orlando, FL	1	<1	<1	This was a title unification match in which Hayes also defended the NXT North American Championship. WWE's official title history incorrectly lists his reign as ending on January 5, 2022.	
—	Unified	January 4, 2022	NXT 2.0: New Year's Evil	Orlando, FL	—	—	—	Carmelo Hayes defeated Roderick Strong to unify the NXT Cruiserweight Championship into the NXT North American Championship. The Cruiserweight Championship was retired with Hayes going forward as North American Champion.	

== Combined reigns ==
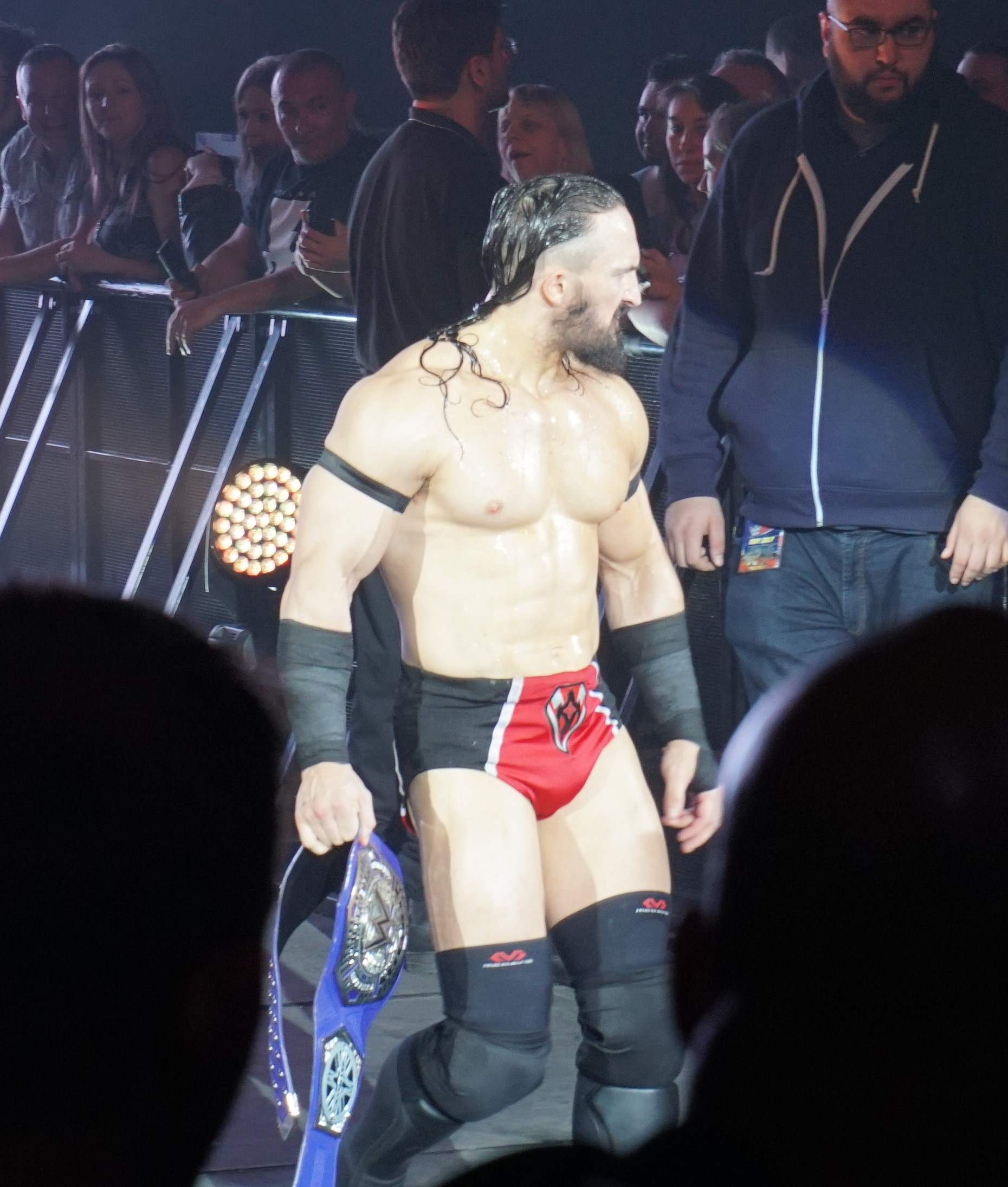
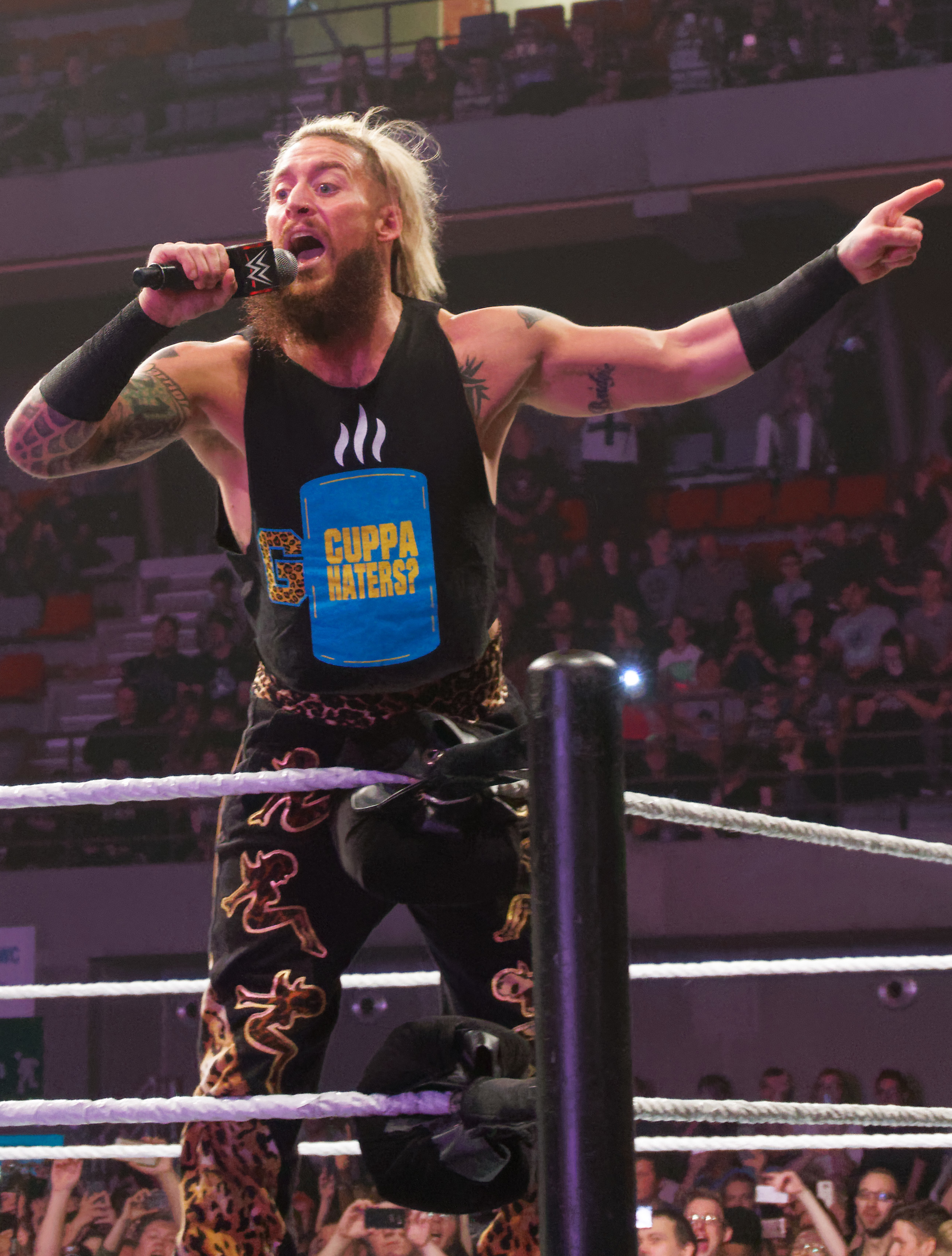
Neville (left) and Enzo Amore (right) tied the record for most reigns at two

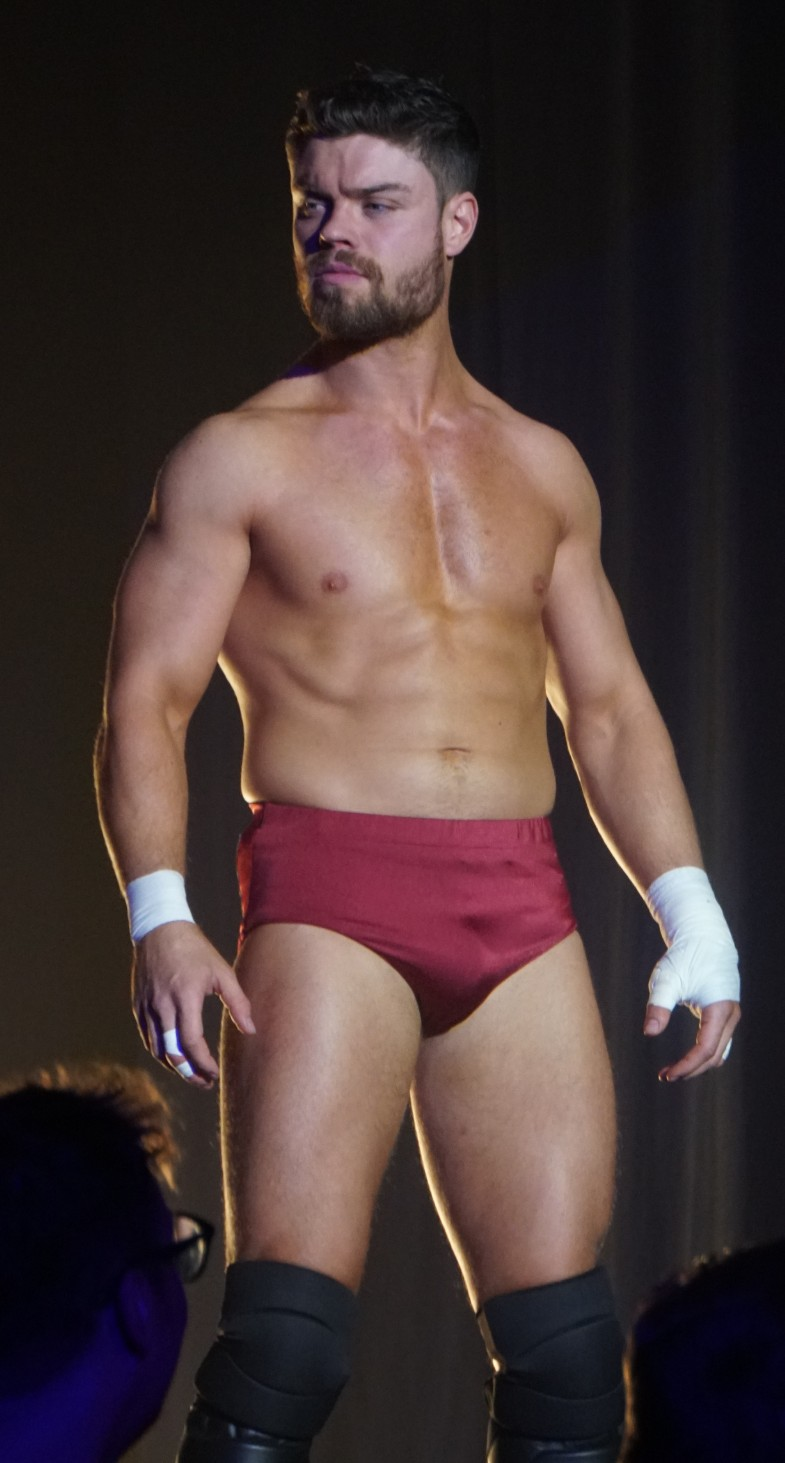
Longest reigning champion Jordan Devlin, who held the title for 439 days

Rank	Wrestler	No. of reigns	Combined days	Combined days rec. by WWE
1	Jordan Devlin	1	439	438
2	El Hijo del Fantasma/Santos Escobar	1	321	313
3	Neville	2	232	231
4	Buddy Murphy	1	183	
5	Cedric Alexander	1	181	180
6	Kushida	1	161	160
7	Enzo Amore	2	108	107
7	Drew Gulak	1	108	
9	Roderick Strong	1	105	
10	Tony Nese	1	77	
11	Lio Rush	1	63	
12	Rich Swann	1	61	60
13	T. J. Perkins	1	46	45
14	Angel Garza	1	45	44
15	The Brian Kendrick	1	30	
16	Kalisto	1	13	12
17	Akira Tozawa	1	6	5
18	Carmelo Hayes	1	<1	
