= NXT Stand & Deliver (2023) =

WWE premium live event

- Promotional poster featuring Grayson Waller, Carmelo Hayes, Bron Breakker, Tiffany Stratton, Roxanne Perez, and Wes Lee
- Promotion: WWE
- Brand: NXT
- Date: April 1, 2023
- City: Los Angeles, California
- Venue: Crypto.com Arena
- Attendance: 7,584

WWE event chronology
← Previous; Elimination Chamber	Next → WrestleMania 39

NXT Stand & Deliver chronology
← Previous; 2022	Next → 2024

NXT major events chronology
← Previous; Vengeance Day	Next → Battleground

The 2023 NXT Stand & Deliver was a professional wrestling premium live event (PLE) produced by WWE, held for wrestlers from the promotion's developmental brand, NXT. It was the third annual Stand & Deliver and took place on Saturday, April 1, 2023, at Crypto.com Arena in Los Angeles, California. The event was held as a part of WrestleMania Weekend, occurring the same day as WrestleMania 39 Night 1 with a special start time of 10:00 a.m. Pacific Time (1:00 p.m. Eastern Time). NXT wrestlers Pretty Deadly (Elton Prince and Kit Wilson) served as the hosts of the event.

Seven matches were contested at the event, including one on the Kickoff pre-show. In the main event, Carmelo Hayes defeated Bron Breakker to win the NXT Championship. In other prominent matches, Wes Lee defeated Axiom, Dragon Lee, Ilja Dragunov, and JD McDonagh in a fatal five-way match to retain the NXT North American Championship, Johnny Gargano defeated Grayson Waller in a unsanctioned match, and in the opening bout, Indi Hartwell defeated Gigi Dolin, Lyra Valkyria, Tiffany Stratton, Zoey Stark, and defending champion Roxanne Perez in a Ladder match to win the NXT Women's Championship. The event featured the in-ring debuts of Dragon Lee and Ava.

This was NXT's final PLE to feature the NXT Women's Tag Team Championship, as it was unified with the WWE Women's Tag Team Championship in June. This was also the first Stand & Deliver to livestream on Disney+ in the Philippines and Binge in Australia.

== Production ==
=== Background ===
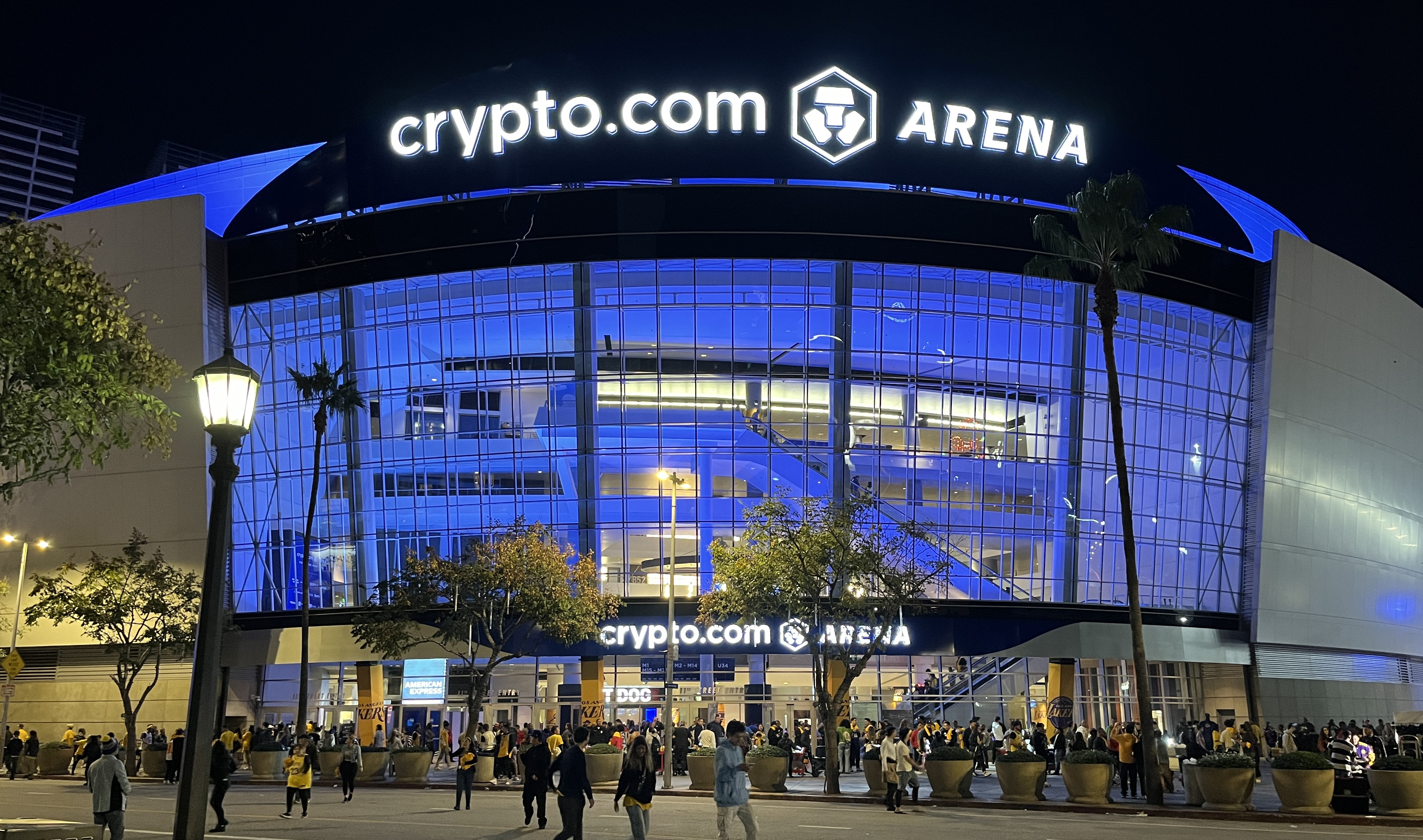
The third annual Stand & Deliver was held at Crypto.com Arena in Los Angeles, California.

Stand & Deliver is an annual professional wrestling premium live event (PLE) held during WrestleMania week by WWE for its developmental brand, NXT, since 2021 and is considered NXT's biggest event of the year. On November 3, 2022, WWE announced that the third Stand & Deliver would be held on Saturday, April 1, 2023, at Crypto.com Arena in Los Angeles, California. It took place during the day of WrestleMania 39 Night 1 with a special start time of 10:00 a.m. Pacific Time (1:00 p.m. Eastern Time). Tickets went on sale on November 18, 2022. On March 14, 2023, it was revealed that NXT wrestlers Pretty Deadly (Elton Prince and Kit Wilson) would serve as the hosts of the event.

=== Broadcast outlets ===
The PLE was broadcast on WWE's livestreaming platforms. These included Peacock in the United States, SonyLIV in India, Disney+ Hotstar in Indonesia, Disney+ in the Philippines, Binge in Australia, and the WWE Network everywhere else. It was the first Stand & Deliver to livestream on Disney+ in the Philippines, following the shutdown of its version of the WWE Network in November 2022, and it was also the first Stand & Deliver to livestream on Binge in Australia after the Australian version of the WWE Network merged under Foxtel's channel Binge in January.

=== Storylines ===
The event comprised seven matches, including one on the Kickoff pre-show, that resulted from scripted storylines. Results were predetermined by WWE's writers on the NXT brand, while storylines were produced on WWE's weekly television program, NXT, and the supplementary online streaming show, Level Up.

In December 2021, Johnny Gargano allowed his NXT contract to expire so he could stay home and spend time with his family following the birth of his first son. Following this, he was interrupted by Grayson Waller, who proclaimed he was the future of NXT, before violently attacking Gargano. In August 2022, Gargano returned to WWE and was promoted to the main roster on the Raw brand. Following his NXT Championship loss, Waller would go on to sabotage NXT until he got what he wanted. Despite being suspended, NXT General Manager Shawn Michaels agreed to talk things over with Waller at NXT: Roadblock. During the "Grayson Waller Effect" talk show, Waller challenged Michaels to a match at Stand & Deliver, but he declined, saying that as much as he wanted to, there was someone who wanted to have a match with Waller even more. Michaels then introduced Waller's opponent for the event, which turned out to be Gargano, returning to NXT for the first time in 15 months. On the March 21 episode, Gargano came up with a contract for an unsanctioned match between him and Waller, but Waller said he would only sign it on the next episode on the condition that Gargano would not be in the building, and Gargano agreed. The next week, Waller signed the contract to make the unsanctioned match stipulation official.

At Vengeance Day after Bron Breakker retained the NXT Championship, he was confronted by Carmelo Hayes (accompanied by Trick Williams). Over the coming weeks, Hayes continued to set his sights on the NXT Championship and at Roadblock, the two agreed to a title match at Stand & Deliver.

On the March 14 episode of NXT, Alba Fyre and Isla Dawn won a triple threat tag team match to become the number one contenders for Fallon Henley and Kiana James's NXT Women's Tag Team Championship at Stand & Deliver.

At NXT: Roadblock, after Roxanne Perez retained her NXT Women's Championship, she suddenly collapsed in the ring. Perez was then taken out of the arena in an ambulance, while nodding her head to say that she was okay. The following week, Shawn Michaels issued a statement via Twitter that Perez was discharged from the hospital, however, after numerous tests, Perez's health was still in question. With that fact, Michaels announced a ladder match at Stand & Deliver to crown a new NXT Women's Champion. Qualifying matches began that same episode, where Zoey Stark and Gigi Dolin qualified by defeating Sol Ruca and Kiana James, respectively. The following week, Tiffany Stratton and Lyra Valkyria qualified by defeating Indi Hartwell and Ivy Nile, respectively. A Last Chance match between Ruca, Hartwell, and Nile was scheduled for the next week episode to determine the last spot in the match, which was won by Hartwell. On the same night, Perez returned, stating she had collapsed due to anxiety, and that she had been cleared by the doctors to return. She was then added to the ladder match, turning it into a title defense.

On the March 14 episode of NXT, after Wes Lee issued an open challenge for his NXT North American Championship, a huge brawl broke out. An NXT Anonymous video showed Shawn Michaels telling Lee that he would be defending his title in a fatal five-way match at Stand & Deliver and allowed Lee to select his four opponents. The following week, Lee chose Dragon Lee, JD McDonagh, and Ilja Dragunov as three of the four spots, and also announced a battle royal for the March 28 episode to determine the last spot in the match, which was won by Axiom.

On the February 7 episode of NXT, Ava of Schism (Jagger Reid, Rip Fowler, and Joe Gacy) attacked Thea Hail of Chase University (Andre Chase and Duke Hudson) backstage. Later that night, Chase University (Chase and Hudson) lost their match after Hail showed up with Schism smiley faces. The feud between the two stables continued and at Roadblock, Schism leader Gacy defeated Chase when Hail got in Ava's face. On the March 21 episode, during a debate between the two teams (which also included Tyler Bate siding with Chase University), they agreed to an eight-person mixed tag team match at Stand & Deliver, where the winning team would gain control of Chase University.

On the March 21 episode of NXT, The Creed Brothers (Brutus Creed and Julius Creed) played pool and darts with NXT Tag Team Champions Gallus (Mark Coffey and Wolfgang) in a bar, and then agreed to a title match at Stand & Deliver. Tony D'Angelo and Channing "Stacks" Lorenzo appeared at the scene, making it a triple threat tag team match.

== Event ==
Other on-screen personnel
Role:	Name:
Commentators	Vic Joseph
Commentators	Booker T
Spanish commentators	Marcelo Rodríguez
Spanish commentators	Jerry Soto
Ring announcer	Alicia Taylor
Referees	Adrian Butler
Referees	Chip Danning
Referees	Dallas Irvin
Referees	Derek Sanders
Referees	Joey Gonzalez
Referees	Danilo Anfibio
Referees	Eddie Orengo
Interviewer	McKenzie Mitchell
Pre-show panel	Peter Rosenberg
Pre-show panel	Dave LaGreca

=== Pre-show ===
There was only one match that took place on the pre-show, and it was the eight-person mixed tag team match pitting Chase University (Andre Chase, Duke Hudson, and Thea Hail) and Tyler Bate against Schism (Joe Gacy, Rip Fowler, Jagger Reid, and Ava) to determine who gained control of Chase U. In the end, Bate delivered a suicide dive that took at all Schism members. Chase and Hudson then delivered the Fratliner to Reid for the win.

=== Preliminary matches ===
The actual PLE began with Roxanne Perez defending the NXT Women's Championship against Indi Hartwell, Gigi Dolin, Lyra Valkyria, Tiffany Stratton and Zoey Stark in a Ladder match. In the closing stages, Dolin climbed the ladder, aiming to reach the title belt, until Jacy Jayne came and pushed her off the ladder. Stratton then delivered a moonsault to take out everyone on the outside, leaving Hartwell in the ring, but was too incapacitated to climb the ladder. Dexter Lumis then came from under the ring and helped Hartwell to climb the ladder and deliver her first singles title in WWE and in NXT.

Next, Gallus (Mark Coffey and Wolfgang) defended the NXT Tag Team Championship against The Creed Brothers (Brutus Creed and Julius Creed) and The Family (Tony D'Angelo and Channing "Stacks" Lorenzo). In the closing stages, Stacks delivered a diving splash to Mark Coffey, but the returning Joe Coffey pulled him to the floor. Coffey then clotheslined D'Angelo, allowing Gallus to perform the Powerslam/Enziguri combination for the win.

In the next bout, Wes Lee defended the NXT North American Championship against Axiom, Dragon Lee, Ilja Dragunov, and JD McDonagh in a fatal five-way match. As Dragon Lee was looking for a backflip kick, Axiom caught him with the Golden Ratio. Axiom then delivered the Matrix DDT for a two-count on McDonagh. Dragunov then hit the Torpedo Moscow on Dragon Lee, and at the same time Lee hit the Cardiac Kick to Dragunov to retain the title.

The next match was an unsanctioned match between Johnny Gargano and Grayson Waller. Waller delivered the Ace Crusher on the outside to Gargano. Gargano then powerbombed Waller through a table. Waller then used a kendo stick and started beating Gargano. As Waller was looking to hit Gargano's head on the steel steps, Gargano escaped and started hitting Waller with the kendo stick, prompting wife Candice LeRae to join in the beating of Waller. Gargano then delivered the One Final Beat for a two-count. Waller then delivered a Coast-To-Coast with Gargano's head in a trash can for another two-count. Gargano then low blowed Waller, and trapped Waller with a chair on his head and smashed it with another chair. Gargano then performed the Gargano Escape, forcing Waller to tap out. After the match, Gargano, LeRae, Hartwell, and Lumis embraced each other.

In the penultimate match, Kiana James and Fallon Henley (accompanied by Josh Briggs and Brooks Jensen) defended the NXT Women's Tag Team Championship against Isla Dawn and Alba Fyre. Dawn delivered double knees to James and, along with Fyre, deliver supericks to James for a nearfall. James then asked Jensen for her handbag, but he refused to give it to her. Back in the ring, Dawn and Fyre performed their Backstabber/Swanton Bomb combination to become the new champions.

=== Main event ===
In the main event, Bron Breakker defended the NXT Championship against Carmelo Hayes (with Trick Williams). As Hayes was looking for a Springboard Cutter, Hayes misstepped and fell. Bron then delivered a back suplex to Hayes. Hayes then delivered a Springboard flying forearm and a fujiwara armbar, but Bron escaped. As Bron was looking for a Torture Rack, Trick grabbed Hayes's leg, forcing the referee to eject him from the match. Bron then delivered a top rope frankensteiner. Hayes then blocked the Steiner Recliner and locked in a crossface, but Bron escaped again and hit a spear that also took out the referee. Bron then locked in the Steiner Recliner, forcing Hayes to tap but the referee was still down. Williams then came back and hit Breakker with the title belt, allowing Hayes to pin him for a two-count. As Breakker was looking for the Military Press Powerslam, Hayes reversed it into a codebreaker and performed the Nothing But Net to become the first person to win the NXT Championship at an NXT premium live event since Samoa Joe in 2021, and ending Bron Breakker's reign at 362 days.

== Reception ==
Dave Meltzer rated the NXT North American Championship match 4.5 stars, the highest of the night. Meanwhile, he gave the NXT Women's Tag Team Championship match 1.5 stars, the lowest of the night. Elsewhere on the card, the kick-off show match received 2.5 stars, the Women's Ladder Match received 3.5 stars, the NXT Tag Team Championship match received 1.75 stars, the unsanctioned match received 4.25 stars, and the main event received 3.25 stars.

== Aftermath ==
New NXT Women's Champion Indi Hartwell opened the following episode of NXT to talk about her title win, only to be interrupted by Zoey Stark. This led to a title match between the two that same night, where Hartwell retained. Afterwards, Tiffany Stratton appeared and pointed at Hartwell, but Cora Jade returned and laid out Hartwell before siding with Stratton. The following week, Perez was confronted by Stark. On the April 18 episode, after Perez defeated Stark, Hartwell stated that Perez would not be a champion without giving her a match for the title she never lost, and challenged her to a match at Spring Breakin'. Stratton interrupted, and stated that Hartwell got lucky to win the title. Hartwell then added Stratton to the match, making it a triple threat match.

A video posted to Twitter showed Axiom confronting NXT North American Champion Wes Lee in an airport, challenging him to a one-on-one match for the title, which Lee accepted. On the following NXT, Lee retained.

Also on NXT, Alba Fyre and Isla Dawn stated that they would curse any team who tried to dethrone them for the NXT Women's Tag Team Championship. Former champions Fallon Henley and Kiana James received a championship rematch the following week, where Fyre and Dawn retained. The 2023 Stand & Deliver would be WWE's final livestreaming event to feature the NXT Women's Tag Team Championship, as Fyre and Dawn were drafted to SmackDown during the 2023 WWE Draft. On the June 23 episode of SmackDown, Ronda Rousey and Shayna Baszler defeated Dawn and Fyre to unify the NXT Women's Tag Team Championship into the WWE Women's Tag Team Championship. The NXT Women's Tag Team Championship was retired with Dawn and Fyre recognized as the final champions.

Andre Chase thanked Tyler Bate for showing up at Stand and Deliver and for helping Chase University win their match. Duke Hudson wanted some recognition, and Chase University (Chase and Thea Hail) presented Hudson with the MVP trophy the following week.

New NXT Champion Carmelo Hayes, alongside Trick Williams, celebrated his title win. Bron Breakker interrupted, and after the two talked about the passing of the torch moment, Breakker held Hayes' arm up, only to turn on Hayes and Williams as the show ended. After Hayes' successful title defense at Spring Breakin', Hayes challenged Breakker to another match for the title at Battleground, but Breakker attacked Hayes and Williams from behind, and speared Hayes through the barricade. On the May 2 episode, Breakker accepted the challenge.

NXT Tag Team Champions Gallus (Joe Coffey, Mark Coffey, and Wolfgang) were interviewed backstage, stating that this was their kingdom. The following week, after Gallus interrupted a photo shoot, they were interrupted by Schism (Joe Gacy, Jagger Reid, Rip Fowler, and Ava), with The Dyad (Fowler and Reid) wanting a title shot. Later that night, The Creed Brothers (Brutus Creed and Julius Creed) also challenged Gallus to a title match, and the match was subsequently scheduled for the following week, where Gallus retained. Eventually, The Creed Brothers were scheduled for another title match against Gallus at Battleground.

Following more weeks of feuding, Gigi Dolin and Jacy Jayne had a match on the May 2 episode of NXT, where Jayne was victorious. One further match was scheduled for the May 30 episode as a weaponized steel cage match, where Dolin won to end the rivalry.

== Results ==
No.	Results	Stipulations	Times
1^{P}	Tyler Bate and Chase University (Thea Hail, Duke Hudson, and Andre Chase) defeated Schism (Ava, Joe Gacy, Rip Fowler, and Jagger Reid) by pinfall	Eight-person mixed tag team match Winners gained control of Chase University.	11:09
2	Indi Hartwell defeated Roxanne Perez (c), Zoey Stark, Gigi Dolin, Lyra Valkyria, and Tiffany Stratton by retrieving the championship belt	Ladder match for the NXT Women's Championship	17:02
3	Gallus (Mark Coffey and Wolfgang) (c) defeated The Family (Tony D'Angelo and Channing "Stacks" Lorenzo) and The Creed Brothers (Julius Creed and Brutus Creed) (with Ivy Nile) by pinfall	Triple threat tag team match for the NXT Tag Team Championship	8:11
4	Wes Lee (c) defeated Axiom, Dragon Lee, Ilja Dragunov, and JD McDonagh by pinfall	Fatal five-way match for the NXT North American Championship	19:17
5	Johnny Gargano defeated Grayson Waller by submission	Unsanctioned match	18:12
6	Alba Fyre and Isla Dawn defeated Fallon Henley and Kiana James (c) (with Josh Briggs and Brooks Jensen) by pinfall	Tag team match for the NXT Women's Tag Team Championship	8:41
7	Carmelo Hayes (with Trick Williams) defeated Bron Breakker (c) by pinfall	Singles match for the NXT Championship	16:10
(c) / – the champion(s) heading into the match; P / – the match was broadcast on the pre-show
