= WrestleMania 43 =

2027 WWE premium live event

WrestleMania 43 ريسلمانيا الرياض (Arabic)
- Promotional poster featuring the Riyadh skyline
- Promotion: WWE
- Brand(s): Raw; SmackDown
- Date: April 2027
- City: Riyadh, Saudi Arabia
- Venue: TBA

WWE event chronology
← Previous; NXT Stand & Deliver	Next → —

WrestleMania chronology
← Previous; 42	Next → —

WWE in Saudi Arabia chronology
← Previous; Crown Jewel	Next → —

WrestleMania 43, also promoted as WrestleMania Riyadh (Arabic: ريسلمانيا الرياض, romanized: rislmanya alriyad), is an upcoming 2027 two-part professional wrestling premium live event (PLE) produced by the American company WWE, to be held for wrestlers from the promotion's main roster brands, Raw and SmackDown. It will be the 43rd annual WrestleMania and is planned to take place as a two-night event in April 2027 in Riyadh, Saudi Arabia as part of the 2026–2027 Riyadh Season.

WrestleMania 43 was originally planned to be held at the New Nissan Stadium in Nashville, Tennessee, with WWE instead wanting to hold WrestleMania 44 in Saudi Arabia, but the country pushed to host WrestleMania 43 to coincide with the 300th anniversary of the founding of the First Saudi state. It will be the first WrestleMania held outside of North America; the third outside the United States after WrestleMania VI and WrestleMania X8 in 1990 and 2002, respectively, both of which were held in Canada; the 17th event WWE will hold in Saudi Arabia as part of its 10-year partnership in support of Saudi Vision 2030; and the second of WWE's "Big Five" events to take place in the country, after the 2026 Royal Rumble.

== Production ==
=== Background ===
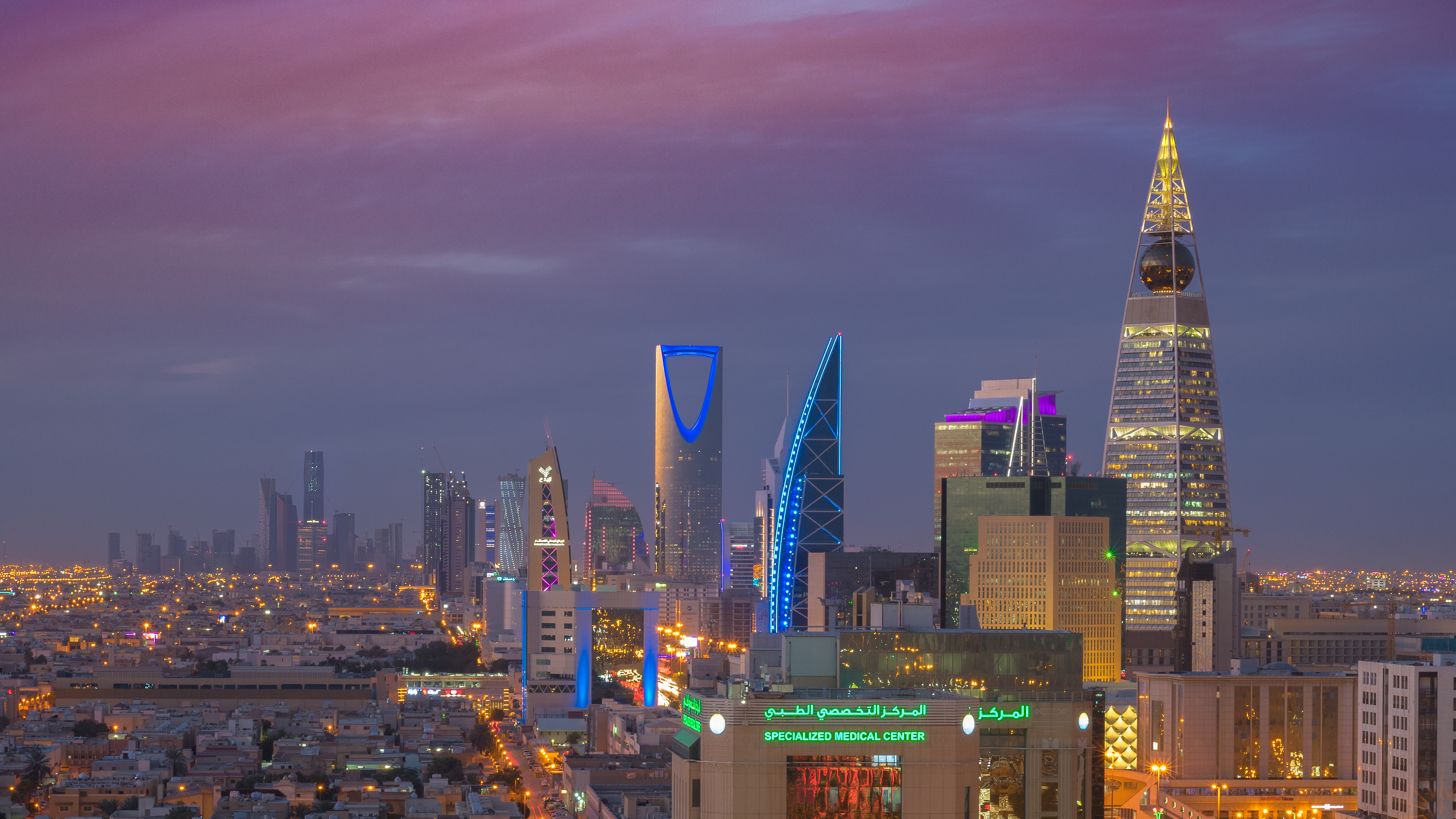
With the 43rd annual WrestleMania taking place in Riyadh, Saudi Arabia (pictured), this will mark the first time for WWE's marquee event to take place outside of North America.

WrestleMania is the American company WWE's flagship professional wrestling premium live event (PLE), having first been held in 1985. It was the company's first pay-per-view (PPV) produced and was also WWE's first major event available via livestreaming when the company launched its former standalone service, the WWE Network, in February 2014. It is the longest-running professional wrestling event in history and is held annually between mid-March to mid-April, featuring wrestlers from WWE's Raw and SmackDown brand divisions. It was the first of WWE's original four PPVs, including Royal Rumble, SummerSlam, and Survivor Series, referred to as the "Big Four", and as of August 2021, it is considered one of the "Big Five", along with Money in the Bank. WrestleMania was ranked the sixth most valuable sports brand in the world by Forbes in 2019, and has been described as the Super Bowl of sports entertainment. Much like the Super Bowl, cities bid for the right to host the year's edition of WrestleMania.

In early 2018, WWE began a 10-year strategic multiplatform partnership with the Ministry of Sport (formerly General Sports Authority) in support of Saudi Vision 2030, Saudi Arabia's social and economic reform program. In May 2024, the chairman of Saudi Arabia's General Entertainment Authority (GEA), Turki Alalshikh, announced that the country was in talks with WWE to bring either the Royal Rumble or WrestleMania to the country in 2026 or 2027. In September the following year, after it was confirmed that the 2026 Royal Rumble would be held in Saudi Arabia, rumors began circulating that WWE were also planning on hosting a WrestleMania in the country. At a press conference on September 12, 2025, featuring Alalshikh and WWE Chief Content Officer Paul "Triple H" Levesque, as well as WWE Hall of Famers The Undertaker and Shawn Michaels and active WWE wrestlers Seth Rollins, Logan Paul, Bianca Belair, Liv Morgan, Stephanie Vaquer, and Charlotte Flair, WWE announced that WrestleMania 43 in 2027 would be the first WrestleMania to take place outside of North America, as it would be held in Riyadh, Saudi Arabia as part of the 2026–2027 Riyadh Season, with the event also promoted as WrestleMania Riyadh, marking the 17th event in the Saudi Arabian partnership. While the exact date and venue have not been announced, WWE did confirm that the two-night event would be held in April 2027 as they announced watch parties to be held in the United States, including the Infosys Theater in New York City, New York and select Cosm locations.

WrestleMania 43 was originally intended to be held in the United States at the New Nissan Stadium in Nashville, Tennessee, as in May 2023, Burke Nihill, president and chief executive officer of the Tennessee Titans of the National Football League, claimed that WWE were committed to holding the event at the stadium if its construction was complete in time. In April 2026, Nashville's tourism group confirmed this was the original plan, but the 2027 date did not work out and they were looking at future years to host the event. WWE had also originally wanted to book WrestleMania 44 in 2028 for Saudi Arabia; however, according to wrestling journalist Dave Meltzer of the Wrestling Observer Newsletter, GEA Chairman Alalshikh pushed for WrestleMania 43 as it coincided with the 300th anniversary of the founding of the First Saudi state.

=== Broadcast outlets ===
Both nights of WrestleMania 43 will be broadcast on traditional PPV outlets worldwide. They will also be available to livestream on ESPN Unlimited in the United States, SuperSport in Sub-Saharan Africa, and Netflix everywhere else.

=== Storylines ===
The event will include matches that result from scripted storylines. Results are predetermined by WWE on the Raw and SmackDown brands while storylines are produced on WWE's weekly television shows, Monday Night Raw and Friday Night SmackDown.

== Matches ==
Night TBA
No.	Matches*	Stipulations
1	TBD (c) vs. Men's Royal Rumble winner	Singles match for the World Heavyweight Championship or the Undisputed WWE Championship
2	TBD (c) vs. Women's Royal Rumble winner	Singles match for the Women's World Championship or the WWE Women's Championship
(c) / – the champion(s) heading into the match; *Card subject to change

== Criticism ==
Like WWE's other events held in Saudi Arabia, the selection of Riyadh as WrestleMania 43's location was condemned by fans due to the country's human rights record. Criticism was also levied for choosing Riyadh over other non-American cities, particularly London; WWE wrestler John Cena previously stated London "deserved" a WrestleMania event during the 2023 Money in the Bank. During WWE's Worlds Collide event in September 2025, fans booed a promotional video for WrestleMania 43 shown during the event's broadcast.

== See also ==
- WWE in Saudi Arabia
- Sports in Saudi Arabia
