= NXT Stand & Deliver (2027) =

2027 WWE professional wrestling event

- Promotion: WWE
- Brand: NXT
- Date: April 2027
- City: Manhattan, New York
- Venue: Infosys Theater at Madison Square Garden

WWE event chronology
← Previous; Royal Rumble	Next → WrestleMania 43

NXT Stand & Deliver chronology
← Previous; 2026	Next → —

NXT major events chronology
← Previous; TLC: Tables, Ladders & Chairs	Next → —

The 2027 NXT Stand & Deliver, also promoted as NXT Stand & Deliver: New York, is an upcoming professional wrestling premium live event (PLE) and television special produced by WWE, to be held for wrestlers from the promotion's developmental brand, NXT. It will be the seventh annual Stand & Deliver and is scheduled to take place in April 2027 at Infosys Theater at Madison Square Garden in the New York City borough of Manhattan, New York. The event will be simulcast on The CW and ESPN Unlimited in the United States, marking the first Stand & Deliver to broadcast on both services. It will also be held as part of WrestleMania 43 weekend, returning the event to WrestleMania weekend after the prior year was a standalone event held two weeks before WrestleMania 42.

== Production ==
=== Background ===
The seventh annual Stand & Deliver will take place at the Infosys Theater at Madison Square Garden in the New York City borough of Manhattan, New York.

Stand & Deliver is an annual professional wrestling premium live event (PLE) typically held during WrestleMania week by WWE for its developmental brand, NXT, since 2021, and is considered NXT's biggest event of the year. On July 20, 2026, WWE announced that the seventh Stand & Deliver would take place in April 2027 at the Infosys Theater at Madison Square Garden in the New York City borough of Manhattan, New York. Additionally, it was confirmed that the event would be held as part of WrestleMania 43 weekend, returning Stand & Deliver to WrestleMania week after the 2025 event was held as a standalone event two weeks before WrestleMania 42.

=== Broadcast outlets ===
In the United States, the event will be broadcast as a television special on The CW's linear channel, marking the first Stand & Deliver on The CW as NXT's PLEs began broadcasting on the channel in June 2026. Additionally, ESPN announced a deal with The CW in which CW Sports, including all of NXT's programming, would be simulcast on both The CW and ESPN Unlimited beginning in August 2026—ESPN Unlimited had already been broadcasting WWE's main roster PLEs since September 2025. As a result, this will also be the first Stand & Deliver on ESPN Unlimited. Outside of the U.S., it will air on SuperSport in Sub-Saharan Africa and Netflix everywhere else.

=== Storylines ===
The event will include matches that result from scripted storylines. Results are predetermined by WWE's writers on the NXT brand, while storylines are produced on WWE's weekly television program, NXT.
