= Royal Rumble (2027) =

WWE premium live event

- Promotional poster featuring Roman Reigns
- Promotion: WWE
- Brand(s): Raw; SmackDown; NXT
- Date: February 6, 2027
- City: Glendale, Arizona
- Venue: State Farm Stadium
- Tagline: 30 Superstars. One Opportunity At Greatness.

WWE event chronology
← Previous; Worlds Collide: Doomsday	Next → NXT Stand & Deliver

Royal Rumble chronology
← Previous; 2026	Next → —

The 2027 Royal Rumble, also promoted as Royal Rumble: Arizona, is an upcoming professional wrestling premium live event (PLE) produced by WWE, to be held for wrestlers from the promotion's Raw, SmackDown, and NXT brand divisions. It will be the 40th annual Royal Rumble event and is scheduled to take place on Saturday, February 6, 2027, at State Farm Stadium in Glendale, Arizona. This will be the second Royal Rumble to be held in February, after 2025, as the event is traditionally held in January.

The event will be based around the Royal Rumble match, a modified 30-person battle royal in which the participants enter at timed intervals instead of all beginning in the ring at the same time and the respective men's and women's winners receive a world championship match at WrestleMania. For the 2027 event, the men's and women's winners will receive a choice of which championship to challenge for at WrestleMania 43. The men's winner can choose Raw's World Heavyweight Championship or SmackDown's Undisputed WWE Championship, while the women have the choice between Raw's Women's World Championship or SmackDown's WWE Women's Championship.

== Production ==
=== Background ===
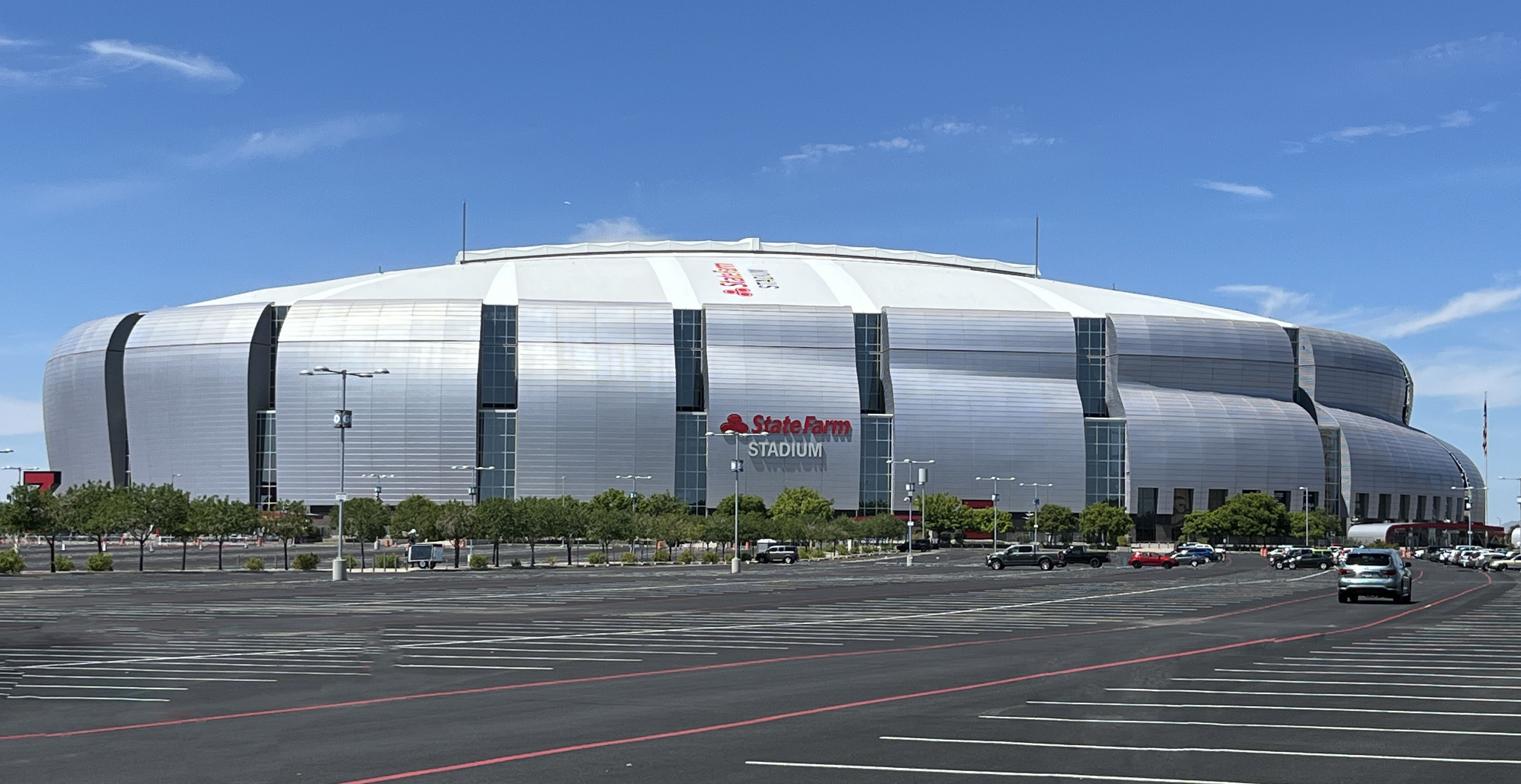
The 40th annual Royal Rumble event will be held at State Farm Stadium in Glendale, Arizona.

The Royal Rumble is an annual professional wrestling premium live event (PLE), traditionally held in January by WWE since 1988; that first event was a television special before it became a pay-per-view (PPV) event beginning in 1989 and then also simulcast on WWE's livestreaming platforms since 2015. It is one of the promotion's original four PPVs, along with WrestleMania, SummerSlam, and Survivor Series, referred to as the "Big Four", and as of August 2021, it is considered one of the "Big Five", along with Money in the Bank. It is named after and centered on the Royal Rumble match.

On August 4, 2026, Ultimate Fighting Championship Chief Executive Officer Dana White announced that the 40th Royal Rumble event would take place in February 2027 at State Farm Stadium in Glendale, Arizona, and would feature wrestlers from the Raw, SmackDown, and NXT brands. This marks only the second Royal Rumble to be held in February, after the 2025 event. On October 5, 2026, it was reported that the event would be held on Saturday, February 6, 2027, which was later confirmed on November 2, 2026. This will also be the third Royal Rumble held in Arizona, after 2013 and 2019, which were both in Phoenix but at different venues. It will also be WWE's second event at State Farm Stadium, which previously hosted WrestleMania XXVI in 2010 when the venue was known as the University of Phoenix Stadium.

The Royal Rumble match is a modified battle royal in which the participants enter at timed intervals instead of all beginning in the ring at the same time, and the match generally features 30 wrestlers. Since 1993, the winner traditionally earns a world championship match at that year's WrestleMania. For 2027, the men and women can choose to challenge for either Raw or SmackDown's top championship at WrestleMania 43: the men have their choice between Raw's World Heavyweight Championship Championship or SmackDown's Undisputed WWE Championship, while the women can choose either Raw's Women's World Championship or SmackDown's WWE Women's Championship.

=== Broadcast outlets ===
The event will be broadcast on traditional PPV outlets worldwide. It will also be available to livestream on ESPN Unlimited in the United States, SuperSport in Sub-Saharan Africa, and Netflix everywhere else.

=== Storylines ===
The event will include matches that result from scripted storylines. Results are predetermined by WWE's writers on the Raw and SmackDown brands, while storylines are produced on WWE's weekly television shows, Monday Night Raw and Friday Night SmackDown.

== Matches ==
No.	Matches*	Stipulations
1	All Participants TBA	30-man Royal Rumble match for a world championship match at WrestleMania 43
2	All Participants TBA	30-woman Royal Rumble match for a world championship match at WrestleMania 43
*Card subject to change
