= NXT Stand & Deliver (2022) =

WWE premium live event

- Promotional poster featuring Dolph Ziggler and Bron Breakker
- Promotion: WWE
- Brand: NXT 2.0
- Date: April 2, 2022
- City: Dallas, Texas
- Venue: American Airlines Center

WWE event chronology
← Previous; Elimination Chamber	Next → WrestleMania 38

NXT Stand & Deliver chronology
← Previous; TakeOver: Stand & Deliver	Next → 2023

NXT major events chronology
← Previous; WarGames	Next → In Your House

The 2022 NXT Stand & Deliver was a professional wrestling premium live event (PLE) produced by WWE, held for wrestlers from the promotion's developmental brand, NXT 2.0. It was the second annual Stand & Deliver and took place on Saturday, April 2, 2022, at the American Airlines Center in Dallas, Texas. The event was held as part of WrestleMania Weekend, occurring the same day as WrestleMania 38 Night 1 with a special start time of 12:00 p.m. Central Time (1:00 p.m. Eastern Time).

Seven matches were contested at the event, including one on the Kickoff pre-show. In the main event, Raw roster member Dolph Ziggler defeated Bron Breakker to retain the NXT Championship. In other prominent matches, MSK (Nash Carter and Wes Lee) defeated defending champions Imperium (Fabian Aichner and Marcel Barthel) and The Creed Brothers (Brutus Creed and Julius Creed) in a triple threat tag team match to win the NXT Tag Team Championship, and in the opening bout, Cameron Grimes defeated defending champion Carmelo Hayes, Santos Escobar, Solo Sikoa, and Grayson Waller in a five-way ladder match to win the NXT North American Championship.

Unlike the previous year's event, which was a two-night event that also aired as a television special for Night 1 and via pay-per-view (PPV) for Night 2, the 2022 event was reduced to a one-day event and only available via WWE's livestreaming platforms as WWE ceased broadcasting NXT's major events on PPV following the previous event, WarGames in December 2021. Although this was the second Stand & Deliver, it was the first to not be held as an NXT TakeOver event, as that event series was discontinued when NXT reverted to being WWE's developmental brand in September 2021 and was rebranded as NXT 2.0. This was also the first NXT event to be held outside of the U.S. state of Florida since TakeOver: Portland in February 2020, just before the start of the COVID-19 pandemic that next month. It was also the first NXT event to livestream on Disney+ Hotstar in Indonesia after the shutdown of its WWE Network in late January, as well as NXT's first event to be branded as a "premium live event", a term the company introduced at the start of the year to refer to its events airing on traditional PPV and via WWE's livestreaming platforms.

== Production ==
=== Background ===
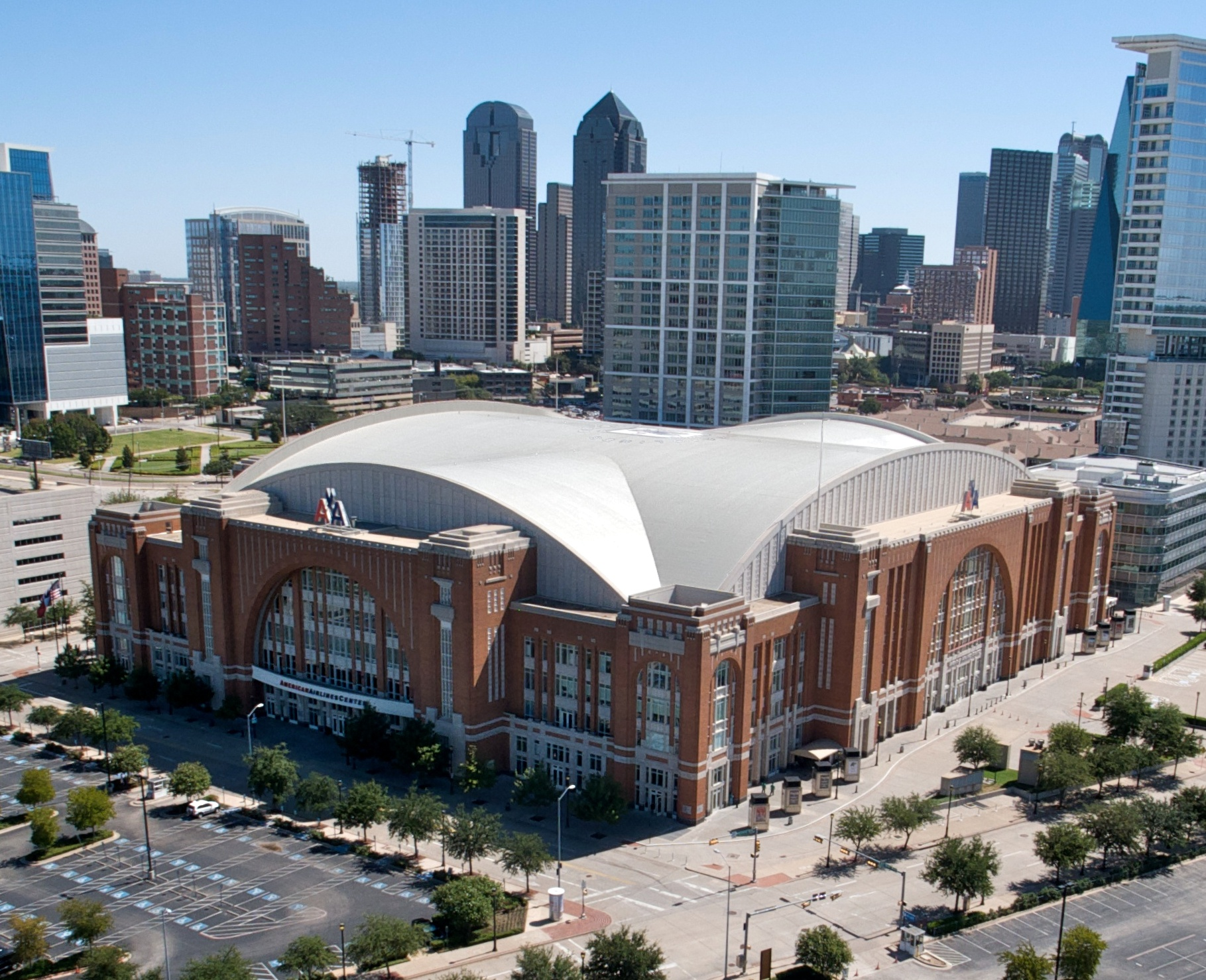
The second annual NXT Stand & Deliver was held at the American Airlines Center in Dallas, Texas, marking NXT's first major event held outside of the U.S. state of Florida since TakeOver: Portland in February 2020, just before the start of the COVID-19 pandemic.

In April 2021 during WrestleMania 37 week, the professional wrestling company WWE held a two-night NXT TakeOver event titled Stand & Deliver for its NXT brand. In September 2021, NXT went through a restructuring and was rebranded as NXT 2.0, reverting to a developmental brand for WWE. The NXT TakeOver series was subsequently discontinued.

On January 24, 2022, a second Stand & Deliver, and the first following the end of the TakeOver series, was announced to be held during WrestleMania 38 weekend, thus establishing Stand & Deliver as NXT's annual WrestleMania week event. This second Stand & Deliver was scheduled to be held at the American Airlines Center in Dallas, Texas on Saturday, April 2, 2022, the same day as WrestleMania 38 Night 1. Due to this, Stand & Deliver had a special start time of 12:00 p.m. Central Time (1:00 p.m. Eastern Time). This marked the first NXT event to be held outside of the U.S. state of Florida since the start of the COVID-19 pandemic in March 2020 and the first held outside of NXT's home arenas—Full Sail University (former) and the WWE Performance Center (current)—since NXT TakeOver: Portland in February 2020. This would also be NXT's first event to be branded as a "premium live event" (PLE), a term the company introduced on January 1 to refer to its events that are available on pay-per-view (PPV) and via WWE's livestreaming platforms.

=== Broadcast outlets ===
Unlike the prior year's two-night event, where in addition to WWE's livestreaming platforms, it aired as a television special on Night 1 and via PPV on Night 2, this year's event only aired on the livestreaming platforms as WWE ceased broadcasting NXT's PLEs on PPV after the previous event, WarGames in December 2021. As such, the 2022 Stand & Deliver was available to livestream Peacock in the United States, SonyLIV in India, Disney+ Hotstar in Indonesia, and the WWE Network everywhere else. This was NXT's first PLE to livestream on Disney+ Hotstar in Indonesia, following the shutdown of its version of the WWE Network in late January.

=== Storylines ===
The event comprised seven matches, including one on the Kickoff pre-show, that resulted from scripted storylines. Results were predetermined by WWE's writers on the NXT brand, while storylines were produced on WWE's weekly television program, NXT 2.0, and the supplementary online streaming show, Level Up.

On the February 8 episode of NXT, Raw's Dolph Ziggler made his first-ever appearance in NXT during the NXT Championship match contract signing between champion Bron Breakker and Santos Escobar. Tommaso Ciampa also interrupted the segment and attacked Ziggler. At NXT: Roadblock on March 8, Breakker, Ciampa, and Ziggler competed in a triple threat match for the championship where Ziggler won the title after interference from Robert Roode. The following week, after Ziggler's successful title defense, Breakker appeared and challenged Ziggler for the title at Stand & Deliver, and Ziggler accepted.

After retaining the NXT North American Championship on the March 1 episode of NXT, Carmelo Hayes announced that he would be defending the title in a ladder match at Stand & Deliver. Qualifying matches then began to determine the other participants in the match. On the March 15 episode, Santos Escobar qualified by defeating Cameron Grimes. The following week, Solo Sikoa and Grayson Waller qualified for by defeating Roderick Strong and A-Kid, respectively. On the March 29 episode, Grimes defeated Strong and A-Kid in a last chance triple threat match to qualify for the final spot.

On the March 15 episode of NXT, Tommaso Ciampa addressed the fans, and seemingly announced his departure from NXT. Tony D'Angelo appeared and challenged Ciampa to a match, claiming that he wanted to be the next "Don of NXT". Ciampa accepted and shook hands before D'Angelo attacked Ciampa with a low blow.

On January 4 at NXT: New Year's Evil, Cora Jade and Raquel González failed to defeat Toxic Attraction leader Mandy Rose in a triple threat match for the NXT Women's Championship. González and Jade then entered that year's Women's Dusty Rhodes Tag Team Classic tournament, where they were eliminated in the semifinals at NXT: Roadblock after interference from the other members of Toxic Attraction, NXT Women's Tag Team Champions Gigi Dolin and Jacy Jayne. Later that night, after the other semifinal match, Jade attacked Rose in the "Toxic Lounge". The following week, Jade stole all of the title belts from Toxic Attraction, with Dolin and Jayne being trapped when they tried to retrieve the tag title belts. As Jade tried to leave the Performance Center with the NXT Women's Championship belt, Rose attacked her and spray-painted the back of Jade, setting up a match between Jade and Rose for the NXT Women's Championship at Stand & Deliver. On the March 29 episode, González saved Dakota Kai from a three-on-one beatdown from Rose, Dolin, and Jayne. Later that night, a tag team match pitting Dolin and Jayne against González and Kai for the tag titles was scheduled for the Stand & Deliver pre-show.

Also in January, Kay Lee Ray began feuding with Toxic Attraction (Mandy Rose, Gigi Dolin, and Jacy Jayne). This led to an NXT Women's Championship match on the February 8 episode of NXT, where Ray failed to win the title from Rose. Afterwards, Io Shirai prevented Ray from a beatdown from Toxic Attraction. Shirai and Ray then entered the 2022 Women's Dusty Rhodes Tag Team Classic, where they defeated Dakota Kai and Wendy Choo in the finals to win the tournament. Afterwards, they challenged Rose for the NXT Women's Championship, turning the title match into a fatal four-way match.

After defeating MSK (Nash Carter and Wes Lee) to win the 2022 Men's Dusty Rhodes Tag Team Classic at NXT: Vengeance Day, The Creed Brothers (Brutus Creed and Julius Creed) were granted an NXT Tag Team Championship match against champions Imperium (Fabian Aichner and Marcel Barthel) at NXT: Roadblock, but they were mysteriously attacked backstage. MSK replaced them in the match, which ended in a no-contest when Julius and Brutus attacked both teams. The following week, The Creed Brothers demanded to know who attacked them. MSK then claimed that they did not attack them, but they deserved a tag team title match. Imperium interrupted and attacked both teams, stating that they would defend the title against both teams as they did not fear anyone. Later that night, a triple threat tag team match between the three teams for the title was scheduled for Stand & Deliver.

On the March 15 episode of NXT, Gunther did not like the fact that LA Knight got an NXT Championship match that night. The following week, after Gunther's match, Knight confronted Gunther and challenged him to a match at Stand & Deliver, which was made official.

== Event ==
Other on-screen personnel
Role:	Name:
Commentators	Vic Joseph
Commentators	Wade Barrett
Spanish commentators	Marcelo Rodríguez
Spanish commentators	Jerry Soto
Ring announcer	Alicia Taylor
Referees	Darryl Sharma
Referees	Dallas Irvin
Referees	Derek Sanders
Referees	Will Charlton
Pre-show panel	Sam Roberts
Pre-show panel	McKenzie Mitchell
Pre-show panel	Beth Phoenix
Pre-show panel	Akbar Gbaja-Biamila

=== Pre-show ===
During the Stand & Deliver pre-show, Toxic Attraction (Gigi Dolin and Jacy Jayne) defended the NXT Women's Tag Team Championship against Dakota Kai and Raquel González. González attempted a Chingona Bomb on Jayne, who escaped, but González performed a big boot on Jayne. González followed up with a twisting Vader Bomb for a nearfall. Kai performed a German Suplex on Jayne and a Pump Kick on Dolin. Jayne and Dolin performed a double Suplex on Kai and followed up with a high-low kick combo on Kai for a nearfall. In the climax, Wendy Choo appeared and struck Dolin with a pillow before throwing orange soda in her face. Back inside the ring, Kai performed a Yakuza Kick to a cornered Jayne followed by a Chingona Bomb by González to win the titles for a record-setting second time.

=== Preliminary matches ===
The actual PLE began with Carmelo Hayes defending the NXT North American Championship against Cameron Grimes, Santos Escobar, Solo Sikoa, and Grayson Waller in a ladder match. During the match, Waller's bodyguard, Sanga, brought a ladder in the ring, only to have Escobar send it to Sanga. After a brawl between Sanga and Sikoa outside the ring, Sanga got the upper hand and tossed Sikoa back inside the ring. Grimes performed a Tope Con Hilo on Escobar, and Hayes performed a Moonsault on Grimes. After Escobar took out Hayes, Escobar attempted to climb the ladder, but was attacked but Waller. Grimes performed a Spanish Fly on Escobar. As Hayes' partner, Trick Williams, set up another ladder, Sanga broke it up with his bare hands. Afterwards, Legado Del Fantasma (Elektra Lopez, Joaquin Wilde, and Raul Mendoza) used the broken pieces of the ladder to take out Sanga. Sikoa performed a Press Slam on Wilde and Mendoza at the same time. As Sikoa and Escobar were at the top of the ladder, Williams tipped it over. Williams was at the top of the ladder when Grimes tipped it over, causing him to crash into the other wrestlers. After Hayes pulled Grimes off the ladder, Hayes and Waller fought at the top of the ladder when Sikoa, Grimes, and Escobar climbed up an adjacent ladder. Waller then knocked Hayes and Escobar off the ladder and touched the title belt, but Escobar performed a Dragonrana on Waller from the top of the ladder. Moments later, Sikoa performed a Frog Splash on Escobar. Grimes performed a Cave In on Sikoa onto a ladder outside the ring. Waller attempted an elbow drop on Hayes, but Hayes moved out of the way, causing Waller to crash. In the closing moments, Hayes attempted to retrieve the title belt, but Escobar performed a Gutbuster and a Phantom Driver on Hayes. Moments later, Grimes performed a Cave In on Escobar. Grimes then retrieved the title belt to win the title for the first time.

In the second match, Tony D'Angelo (accompanied by AJ Galante) faced Tommaso Ciampa. During the match, D'Angelo retrieved a crowbar, but Ciampa intercepted him with a big boot. While the referee tossed the crowbar away, D'Angelo performed a low blow on Ciampa and followed up with a Fisherman's buster for a nearfall. As D'Angelo tossed the crowbar back inside the ring, Ciampa performed Willow's Bell and a Fairytale ending for a nearfall. Ciampa then applied a crossface on D'Angelo, who made it to the rope to escape. In the climax, D'Angelo performed a DDT on Ciampa on the exposed concrete and back inside, D'Angelo performed a face wash boot on Ciampa to win the match, which marked Ciampa's last NXT match. Afterwards, Triple H appeared to share the special moment with Ciampa and both embraced and went backstage.

In the third match, Imperium (Fabian Aichner and Marcel Barthel) defended the NXT Tag Team Championship against MSK (Wes Lee and Nash Carter) and The Creed Brothers (Brutus Creed and Julius Creed) (accompanied by Malcolm Bivens and Ivy Nile) in a triple threat tag team match. In the end, Aichner and Barthel attempted a European Bomb on Carter, but Carter countered into a sunset bomb. Lee performed a top-rope Frankensteiner on Barthel, which sent him into a powerbomb by Carter to win the titles for MSK for a second time.

In the fourth match, Mandy Rose defended the NXT Women's Championship against Cora Jade, Kay Lee Ray, and Io Shirai in a fatal four-way match. Before the match, Rose unveiled an updated design of the NXT Women's Championship belt, featuring the same overall design but now on a white leather strap and with multi-colors within the ridges of the center plate (matching the NXT 2.0 color scheme). At the beginning of the match, the challengers sent Rose out of the ring. Ray and Shirai performed simultaneous suicide dives on Rose and Jade, respectively. Shirai attempted a 619 on Ray, but Rose pulled her out of the ring. Rose performed a belly-to-belly suplex and a spinebuster on Jade for a nearfall. Rose performed a vertical suplex on Jade. Shirai performed a Moonsault on Ray. Back inside the ring, Shirai performed a 619 and a top rope Dropkick on Ray for a nearfall. Ray applied a Koji Clutch on Rose while Shirai applied a Texas Cloverleaf on Jade. Jade sent Shirai into Ray to break the submissions. Jade performed a Canadian Destroyer on Ray on the ring apron. Shirai performed a German Suplex on Rose for a nearfall. Shirai performed a top rope Spanish Fly suplex on Rose, but Jade performed a Senton on Shirai to break up the pin. In the closing moments, Jade performed a Running Knee, Sliced Bread, and a modified Paydirt on Rose for a nearfall. Ray performed a KLR bomb on Jade, but Shirai shoved Ray off the top rope. Shirai then performed a Moonsault on Jade but as she attempted a pin, Rose performed a Bicycle Knee on Shirai to retain the title.

In the penultimate match, Gunther faced LA Knight. In the climax, as Knight was on the top turnbuckle, Gunther chopped him off and into the ring. Gunther followed up with a top-rope splash and a Powerbomb on Knight to win the match. This would also be Knight's final NXT appearance.

=== Main event ===
In the main event, Dolph Ziggler (accompanied by Robert Roode) defended the NXT Championship against Bron Breakker. While Breakker made his entrance, he broke the "X" in the NXT 2.0 logo in half with a chainsaw. Early in the match, after Breakker dominated, Roode grabbed his leg to halt his momentum. The referee saw this and ejected Roode from ringside, after which, Ziggler took off a turnbuckle pad. Breakker performed a Frankensteiner on Ziggler for a nearfall. Breakker performed a Spear on Ziggler for another nearfall. Ziggler attempted a Superkick, but Breakker caught him and followed up with a second Spear. Breakker then performed a Military Press Powerslam on Ziggler, but Roode returned to take Ziggler out of the cover. Despite this, the match continued. Breakker then leapt over the top rope to take out both Roode and Ziggler. After Breakker sent Roode into the steel ring steps, Ziggler performed a Fameasser and a Zig-Zag on Breakker for a nearfall. Ziggler followed up with a top rope elbow drop on Breakker for another nearfall. In the climax, Breakker attempted another Military Press Powerslam, but Ziggler escaped by raking Breakker's eyes. Ziggler then shoved Breakker into the exposed turnbuckle pad and performed a Superkick to retain the title.

== Reception ==
John Moore of Pro Wrestling Dot Net called the NXT Title match "a really good WWE main roster style PPV main event", giving praise to Breakker and Ziggler's performances, felt the North American Title Ladder bout was a "good opening high spot match" that got viewers invested in the show, saw Gunther/LA Knight as formulaic but "a fun formula to watch", and critiqued that the NXT Women's Title Fatal four-way had rough elements whenever Rose and Jade interacted with each other. He concluded by saying "this was not an NXT Takeover by any means. The closest match to the usual NXT style was the opening ladder match, and you see those on main roster PPVs too. The amount of strange booking and plot convenience made this feel main rostery, which is not great when it comes off as inferior with all the green talent. So when it comes to judging this on the Takeover curve, this doesn't even make the mark". Matthew McFarlin of Slam Wrestling reviewed the event and gave it 2.5 out of 5 stars. He wrote that: "The North American Championship ladder match was impossible to follow, and the remainder of the card suffered because of it. While the opener had exciting, well-executed chaos, some matches were just messy and unengaging. Ziggler and Breakker put on a solid main event, but it wasn't enough to make Stand & Deliver worthwhile".

== Aftermath ==
On the April 4 episode of Raw, Bron Breakker got his rematch against Dolph Ziggler and defeated him to win the NXT Championship for a second time, which was the third time the title was defended on Raw, as well as the first time the title changed hands on Raw. At NXT the next day, Breakker talked about his win over Ziggler, only to be interrupted by Imperium (Gunther, Fabian Aichner, and Marcel Barthel). Gunther challenged Breakker for the title, and the match was scheduled for that episode's main event, where Breakker retained. Also on that same episode, The Creed Brothers (Brutus Creed and Julius Creed) defeated Aichner and Barthel after Aichner walked away from the match. Afterwards, The Creed Brothers were attacked by two hooded men, who were later revealed to be Pretty Deadly (Kit Wilson and Elton Prince, formerly "Lewis Howley" and "Sam Stoker", respectively, in NXT UK), making their NXT debut. This was Gunther and Barthel's final NXT appearance, as three days later, Gunther and Barthel, the latter receiving a new ring name called Ludwig Kaiser, debuted on SmackDown. The other member of Imperium, Fabian Aichner, stayed in NXT for a few more months, and received a new ring name called Giovanni Vinci. He made his main roster debut at Clash at the Castle, where he and Kaiser accompanied Gunther (who defended his Intercontinental Championship against Sheamus at the event), reforming Imperium in the process.

This would be Nash Carter's final WWE match. NXT Tag Team Champions MSK (Wes Lee and Carter) were scheduled to have a title defense on the April 12 episode of NXT, but on April 6, Carter was released from WWE, and the titles were vacated as a result. This led to a tag team gauntlet match for the vacant championships in which Pretty Deadly (Kit Wilson and Elton Prince), in their debut match on NXT, won by last eliminating The Creed Brothers (Brutus Creed and Julius Creed).

A title rematch between Toxic Attraction (Gigi Dolin and Jacy Jayne) and new NXT Women's Tag Team Champions Dakota Kai and Raquel González was announced for the following episode of NXT. During the match, Wendy Choo tried to interfere, only for NXT Women's Champion Mandy Rose to attack her. This allowed Dolin and Jayne to defeat Kai and González to become record-tying two-time NXT Women's Tag Team Champions. Later that night, Kai destroyed equipment backstage, and warned Rose that she was not safe. This would be González's final NXT appearance before she was called up to the main roster on SmackDown and debuted on the April 8 episode of SmackDown under the new ring name "Raquel Rodriguez". On the April 12 episode of NXT, Kai challenged Rose for the NXT Women's Championship in a losing effort after interference from Dolin and Jayne. This would in turn be Kai's final appearance in WWE until she returned on the main roster at SummerSlam in July alongside Bayley and Io Shirai, as Kai was released from her contract on April 29.

Over the coming weeks, Wendy Choo kept targeting Toxic Attraction (NXT Women's Champion Mandy Rose and NXT Women's Tag Team Champions Gigi Dolin and Jacy Jayne), including an unsuccessful attempt at winning the NXT Women's Tag Team Championship. After Choo attacked Rose following the latter's match on the May 24 episode of NXT, a title match between Rose and Choo was scheduled for In Your House.

Cameron Grimes talked about his NXT North American Championship win, only to be interrupted by Solo Sikoa, setting up a match between the two for the title for the following week, where Grimes retained. Following the match, Grimes was attacked by Carmelo Hayes and Trick Williams. On the April 19 episode, after Hayes' match, Hayes stated that he would be taking the title back from Grimes at Spring Breakin'. As Hayes and Grimes stared each other down, Sikoa appeared and attacked Hayes and Williams. Later that night, a triple threat match between Grimes, Hayes, and Sikoa for the title was scheduled for Spring Breakin'.

Following Tony D'Angelo's win at Stand & Deliver, AJ Galante officially crowned him the "Don of NXT" on the following episode of NXT.

This would also be the final WWE appearance for Io Shirai and Kay Lee Ray before their ring names were changed to Iyo Sky (July 30 during SummerSlam, stylized in all caps) and "Alba Fyre" (first reported April 16 by PWInsider; made official during a video package on the April 26 episode of NXT), respectively.

== Results ==
No.	Results	Stipulations	Times
1^{P}	Raquel González and Dakota Kai defeated Toxic Attraction (Gigi Dolin and Jacy Jayne) (c) by pinfall	Tag team match for the NXT Women's Tag Team Championship	7:53
2	Cameron Grimes defeated Carmelo Hayes (c) (with Trick Williams), Santos Escobar (with Raul Mendoza, Joaquin Wilde, and Elektra Lopez), Solo Sikoa, and Grayson Waller (with Sanga) by retrieving the championship belt	Ladder match for the NXT North American Championship	21:01
3	Tony D'Angelo (with AJ Galante) defeated Tommaso Ciampa by pinfall	Singles match	13:11
4	MSK (Nash Carter and Wes Lee) defeated Imperium (Fabian Aichner and Marcel Barthel) (c) and The Creed Brothers (Brutus Creed and Julius Creed) (with Malcolm Bivens and Ivy Nile) by pinfall	Triple threat tag team match for the NXT Tag Team Championship	11:22
5	Mandy Rose (c) defeated Cora Jade, Kay Lee Ray, and Io Shirai by pinfall	Fatal four-way match for the NXT Women's Championship	13:28
6	Gunther defeated LA Knight by pinfall	Singles match	10:24
7	Dolph Ziggler (c) (with Robert Roode) defeated Bron Breakker by pinfall	Singles match for the NXT Championship	16:14
(c) / – the champion(s) heading into the match; P / – the match was broadcast on the pre-show

=== Women's Dusty Rhodes Tag Team Classic bracket ===
First round NXT (February 22, 2022 – March 1, 2022)
Io Shirai and Kay Lee Ray	Pin
Amari Miller and Lash Legend	2:44
Ivy Nile and Tatum Paxley	3:26
Kacy Catanzaro and Kayden Carter	Pin
Indi Hartwell and Persia Pirotta	5:21
Dakota Kai and Wendy Choo	Pin
Yulisa León and Valentina Feroz	4:47
Raquel González and Cora Jade	Pin

Semifinals; NXT: Roadblock (March 8, 2022)
Io Shirai and Kay Lee Ray	Pin
Kacy Catanzaro and Kayden Carter	7:59
Dakota Kai and Wendy Choo	Pin
Raquel González and Cora Jade	10:42

Final; NXT (March 22, 2022)
Io Shirai and Kay Lee Ray	Pin
Dakota Kai and Wendy Choo	10:22
