= NXT TakeOver: Stand & Deliver =

2021 WWE livestreaming event, television special, and pay-per-view event

- Promotional poster featuring various NXT wrestlers
- Promotion: WWE
- Brand: NXT
- Date: April 7–8, 2021
- City: Orlando, Florida
- Venue: Capitol Wrestling Center at WWE Performance Center
- Attendance: 500 (total for each night)

WWE event chronology
← Previous; Fastlane	Next → WrestleMania 37

NXT TakeOver chronology
← Previous; Vengeance Day	Next → In Your House

NXT Stand & Deliver chronology
← Previous; First	Next → NXT Stand & Deliver (2022)

NXT TakeOver: Stand & Deliver was a 2021 two-part professional wrestling event produced by WWE, held exclusively for wrestlers from the promotion's NXT brand division. It was the 34th NXT TakeOver event and the inaugural Stand & Deliver, and it was broadcast as a television special on Night 1 and via pay-per-view (PPV) on Night 2, with both nights simulcast on WWE's livestreaming platforms. The event took place during WrestleMania 37 week on Wednesday, April 7, and Thursday, April 8, 2021, from the Capitol Wrestling Center, a bio-secure bubble that was hosted at the WWE Performance Center in Orlando, Florida.

This was the first TakeOver to livestream on SonyLIV in India following the shutdown of the Indian version of the WWE Network in February. This was also WWE's first in-ring event to livestream on Peacock in the United States after the shutdown of the standalone American version of the WWE Network on April 4; at the time, other countries maintained the WWE Network. The first night was simulcast as a special episode of NXT on the USA Network in the United States, making it the only TakeOver to air on television as well as the final NXT broadcast on Wednesdays before moving to Tuesdays on April 13, while the second night was simulcast on traditional PPV. This was the first and only TakeOver, as well as the only major NXT livestreaming event, to be held as a two-night event. While still taking precautions due to the ongoing COVID-19 pandemic, seating capacity was increased and the plexiglass walls that previously separated fans were removed.

The card consisted of 12 matches evenly divided across both nights, including one match on the pre-show for each night. In the main event for Night 1, Raquel González defeated Io Shirai to win the NXT Women's Championship. Other prominent matches included Walter defeating Tommaso Ciampa to retain the NXT United Kingdom Championship and MSK (Wes Lee and Nash Carter) defeated Grizzled Young Veterans (James Drake and Zack Gibson) and Legado Del Fantasma (Raul Mendoza and Joaquin Wilde) to win the vacant NXT Tag Team Championship. Two matches were promoted as main event matches for Night 2. In what was the final match on the card, Kyle O'Reilly defeated Adam Cole in an unsanctioned match. In the penultimate match that was promoted as the other main event match, Karrion Kross defeated Finn Bálor to win the NXT Championship. In another prominent match on the undercard which opened the event, interim champion Santos Escobar defeated lineal champion Jordan Devlin in a ladder match to determine the undisputed NXT Cruiserweight Champion.

While the TakeOver series was discontinued in September, Stand & Deliver continued on, becoming NXT's biggest annual event of the year. It would also continue to be held during WrestleMania week until 2026 when it was held two weeks before WrestleMania 42 that year. This would be the only Stand & Deliver to air as a television special, as well as the only to air on PPV, as it became solely a livestreaming event beginning in 2022 as WWE ceased broadcasting NXT's major events on traditional PPV following WarGames in December.

== Production ==
=== Background ===
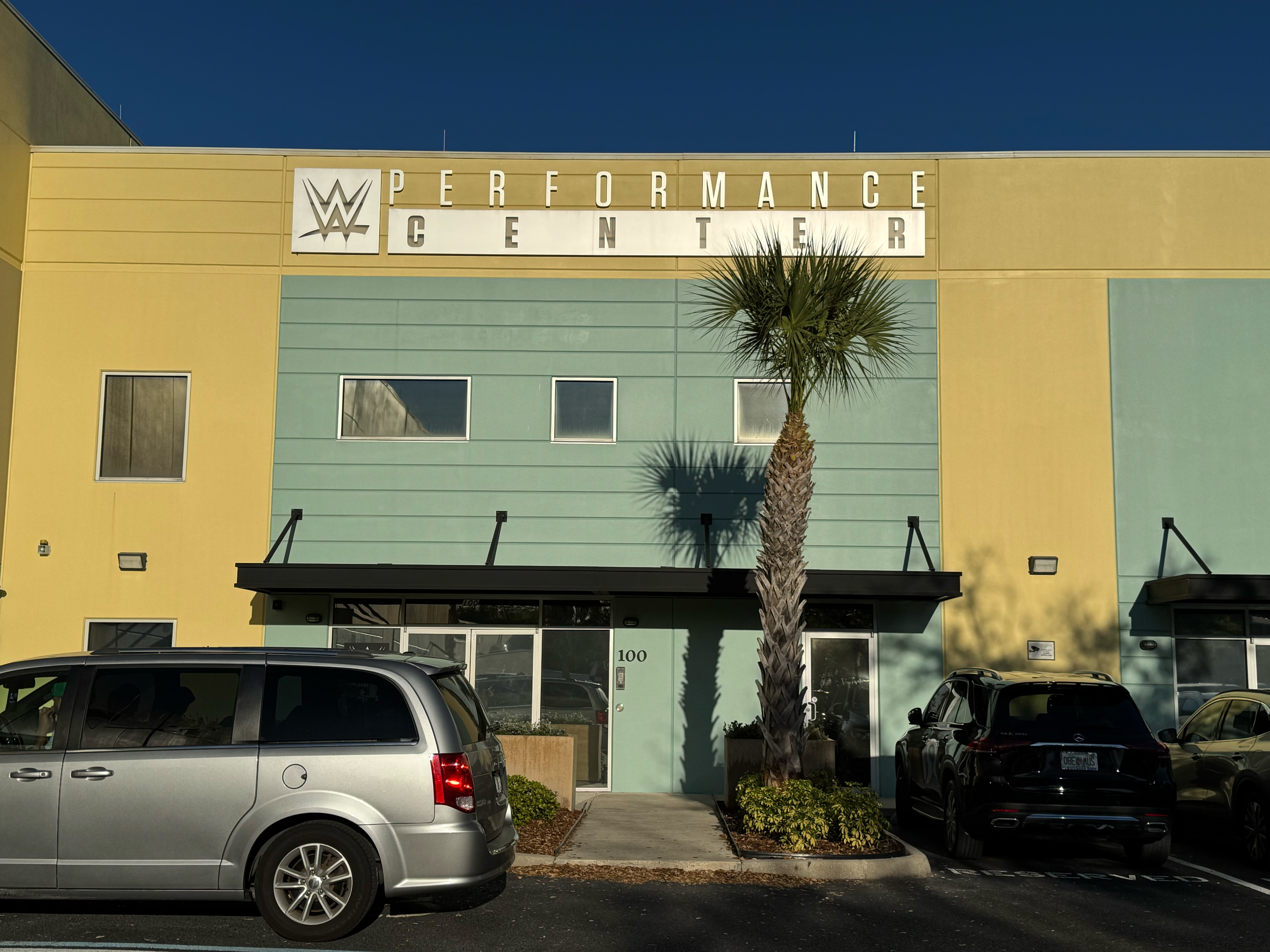
Due to the COVID-19 pandemic, the 34th NXT TakeOver event, and inaugural Stand & Deliver, was produced by way of a bio-secure bubble called the Capitol Wrestling Center, which was hosted at the WWE Performance Center in Orlando, Florida.

TakeOver was a series of professional wrestling events that began in May 2014, as WWE's NXT brand held its second WWE Network-exclusive livestreaming event, billed as TakeOver. The "TakeOver" moniker subsequently became the branding for all of NXT's major events held periodically throughout the year. While originally exclusive to the WWE Network, TakeOver events also became available on traditional pay-per-view (PPV) beginning with TakeOver 31 in October 2020.

Announced during the March 10, 2021, episode of NXT, Stand & Deliver was scheduled as the 34th TakeOver event, and the first-ever two-night TakeOver, taking place on April 7 and 8, 2021, during the week of WrestleMania 37, subsequently being the only TakeOver to be held on a Wednesday and Thursday night. Both nights were broadcast on WWE's livestreaming platforms: Peacock in the United States, SonyLIV in India, and the WWE Network everywhere else. This made it the first TakeOver to livestream on SonyLIV after the shutdown of the Indian version of the WWE Network in February, and it made it WWE's first in-ring event to livestream on Peacock after the shutdown of the standalone American version of the WWE Network on April 4. The first night was also simulcast in NXT's normal timeslot on the USA Network, making it the only TakeOver to air on USA and on cable television. This was also the final NXT event to air in the Wednesday night timeslot, as NXT began airing on Tuesdays on April 13. The second night also aired on traditional PPV. Guitarist Nita Strauss performed "The Star-Spangled Banner" on Night 1, while musician Poppy performed her song "Say Cheese" on Night 2.

==== Impact of the COVID-19 pandemic ====
As a result of the COVID-19 pandemic that began affecting the industry in mid-March 2020, WWE had to present the majority of its programming from a behind closed doors set. NXT's programming was initially held at NXT's home venue at the time, Full Sail University in Winter Park, Florida. In October 2020, NXT's events were moved to the Capitol Wrestling Center, a bio-secure bubble that was hosted at the WWE Performance Center in Orlando, Florida. Like the WWE ThunderDome utilized for Raw and SmackDown's programming, LED boards were placed around the Performance Center so that fans could attend virtually, while additionally and unlike the ThunderDome, friends and family members of the wrestlers were in attendance, along with a limited number of actual live fans, divided from each other by plexiglass walls.

For TakeOver: Stand & Deliver, seating capacity was increased at the Capitol Wrestling Center, with extra rows of seats being added, and the plexiglass dividers being removed. Fans, however, were still required to wear masks, and were given free COVID tests prior to entering, with a negative test needed to enter.

=== Storylines ===
The card comprised a total of 12 matches evenly divided between the two nights, which included one pre-show match each night. The matches resulted from scripted storylines. Results were predetermined by WWE's writers on the NXT brand, while storylines were produced on WWE's weekly television program, NXT.

==== Main event matches ====
At TakeOver XXX on August 22, 2020, Karrion Kross won the NXT Championship; however, during the match, he suffered a legitimate shoulder injury, requiring him to relinquish the title. Finn Bálor then won the vacant championship at NXT: Super Tuesday II on September 8. Kross then made his return from injury in December. Following Bálor's title defense on the March 10, 2021, episode of NXT, he was finally confronted by Kross over the championship. Bálor was subsequently scheduled to defend the NXT Championship against Kross at TakeOver: Stand & Deliver, which was scheduled as the main event of Night 2.

At TakeOver: Vengeance Day, after Finn Bálor's NXT Championship defense against Pete Dunne, he was attacked by Dunne, Danny Burch, and Oney Lorcan. The Undisputed Era (Adam Cole, Kyle O'Reilly, and Roderick Strong) came to Bálor's aid to fend off Dunne, Burch, and Lorcan. Bálor and The Undisputed Era then stood together until Cole delivered a superkick to Bálor. O'Reilly then began to question Cole and Cole also superkicked O'Reilly. This ultimately led to The Undisputed Era disbanding, with Cole and O'Reilly feuding due to Cole wanting the NXT Championship which O'Reilly had also been contending for. On the March 24 episode of NXT, an unsanctioned match between Cole and O'Reilly was scheduled for TakeOver: Stand & Deliver Night 2.

At TakeOver: WarGames in December 2020, Raquel González's team defeated NXT Women's Champion Io Shirai's team in a WarGames match, with González pinning Shirai. Over the coming weeks, González continued to set her sights on the title and on the March 10, 2021, episode of NXT, González and her partner, Dakota Kai, were confronted by Shirai, who challenged González to a match. The following week, after Kai won her match, Shirai appeared and walked past Kai to go face-to-face with González and challenge her to a match, while shoving a contract at her. Later that night, González accepted the challenge. On March 20, the match was confirmed to take place in the main event of Night 1 of TakeOver: Stand & Deliver.

==== Undercard matches ====
As a result of the COVID-19 pandemic, NXT Cruiserweight Champion Jordan Devlin was unable to travel to the United States. An interim champion was then crowned to serve as titleholder in the U.S. until Devlin could return. Santos Escobar became the interim champion, and over the course of the following year, Devlin defended the lineal title on NXT UK (when shows resumed in September 2020) while Escobar defended the interim title on NXT. After the travel ban was lifted in March 2021, Devlin made his return to the U.S. on the March 17 episode of NXT and confronted Escobar over who the real champion was. Escobar then challenged Devlin to a match at TakeOver: Stand & Deliver to determine the undisputed NXT Cruiserweight Champion. The following week, the championship unification match was scheduled as a ladder match for Night 2.

As a result of Danny Burch getting injured during his match on the March 17 episode of NXT, NXT General Manager William Regal vacated the NXT Tag Team Championship, which Burch had held with Oney Lorcan. On the March 24 episode, Regal scheduled a triple threat tag team match for the vacant championship for Night 1 of TakeOver: Stand & Deliver between MSK (Wes Lee and Nash Carter), Grizzled Young Veterans (James Drake and Zack Gibson), and Legado Del Fantasma (Raul Mendoza and Joaquin Wilde).

On the March 24 episode of NXT, a six-man Gauntlet Eliminator match was scheduled for TakeOver: Stand & Deliver Night 1 with the winner receiving an NXT North American Championship match against Johnny Gargano on Night 2. The six participants for the gauntlet match were determined by a 12-man battle royal the following week. Leon Ruff, Isaiah "Swerve" Scott, Bronson Reed, Cameron Grimes, Dexter Lumis, and LA Knight qualified for the Gauntlet Eliminator match, entering in that order.

On the March 17 episode of NXT, after Tommaso Ciampa defeated Marcel Barthel (accompanied by Fabian Aichner), NXT United Kingdom Champion Walter appeared and, along with Imperium (Aichner and Barthel), laid out Ciampa. The following week, after Walter won his match, Ciampa appeared and challenged Walter for the NXT UK Championship at TakeOver: Stand & Deliver. Following this, Imperium laid out Ciampa, after which, Walter accepted the challenge and the match was scheduled for Night 1.

On the March 10 episode of NXT, after Pete Dunne won his match, Dunne stated that he was the best technical wrestler in the world and dared anyone to try to prove him wrong. During this time, Kushida began setting his sights on a match against Dunne. On the March 31 episode, Kushida was interviewed backstage, but was interrupted by Dunne, who told Kushida that the previous week, he called himself the best technical wrestler in NXT, and Dunne stated that he held that crown. Kushida then told Dunne something in Japanese, and later that night, a match between the two was made official for Night 1 of TakeOver: Stand & Deliver.

On the February 10 episode of NXT, Ember Moon and Shotzi Blackheart defeated The Way (Candice LeRae and Indi Hartwell) in a semifinals match of the inaugural women's Dusty Rhodes Tag Team Classic. The following week, Moon and Blackheart defeated The Way in a rematch after Johnny Gargano brought out Austin Theory to the stage, causing LeRae to check on Theory. On the March 10 episode, Moon and Blackheart won the NXT Women's Tag Team Championship. Two weeks later, after Moon and Blackheart's successful title defense, they were confronted by The Way backstage, with Hartwell and LeRae stating that the champions needed real competition. On the March 31 episode, after The Way won their match, they challenged Moon and Blackheart to a title match at TakeOver: Stand & Deliver, and the champions accepted. The match was subsequently scheduled for Night 2.

On April 6, a match between Zoey Stark and Toni Storm was scheduled for the Night 1 Kickoff pre-show, while on April 8, a match pitting Breezango (Tyler Breeze and Fandango) against Killian Dain and Drake Maverick to determine the number one contenders for the NXT Tag Team Championship was scheduled for the Night 2 Kickoff pre-show.

== Event ==
Other on-screen personnel
Role:	Name:
Commentators	Vic Joseph
Commentators	Wade Barrett
Commentators	Beth Phoenix
Ring announcer	Alicia Taylor
Referees	Drake Wuertz
Referees	Darryl Sharma
Referees	D. A. Brewer
Referees	Stephon Smith
Referees	Aja Smith
Referees	Jake Clemons
Interviewers	McKenzie Mitchell
Interviewers	Samoa Joe
Pre-show panel	Sam Roberts
Pre-show panel	Jimmy Smith
Pre-show panel	Mickie James
Pre-show panel	Arash Markazi

=== Night 1 ===
==== Pre-show ====
During the Night 1 pre-show, Zoey Stark took on Toni Storm. Stark dominated until Storm decided to cheat a bit. Stark performed a half-and-half suplex and a basement knee for a nearfall. Storm performed an Electric Chair slam for a nearfall. In the climax, Storm performed German Suplexes on Stark and went for a Storm Zero, however, Stark countered into a roll-up to win the match.

==== Preliminary matches ====
Night 1 began with Pete Dunne taking on Kushida. The match consisted of technical wrestling throughout the whole match. In the climax, Kushida threw forearms at Dunne, however, Dunne repeatedly targeted Kushida's fingers before performing a Roundhouse Kick and the Bitter End to win the match.

Next, the six-man elimination gauntlet match between LA Knight, Bronson Reed, Isaiah "Swerve" Scott, Cameron Grimes, Leon Ruff, and Dexter Lumis was contested, where the winner would face Johnny Gargano for the NXT North American Championship at Night 2. Ruff was the first to be eliminated by Scott. Lumis was eliminated by a roll-up by Knight. Afterwards, Grimes, Scott, and Reed teamed together to eliminate Knight. Grimes was eliminated by Scott with a roll-up. Reed kicked out of a 450 splash and three consecutive House Calls. Reed recovered and performed a massive Powerbomb followed by an Alabama Driver. He executed his signature Tsunami Splash to pin Scott and win the match.

After that, Walter defended the NXT UK Championship against Tommaso Ciampa. During the match, Ciampa kicked out of a roll-up and performed a Fairytale ending on Walter for a nearfall. Ciampa countered a powerbomb attempt by biting Walter's hand. Ciampa performed an armbar on Walter, who reached the ropes to void the submission. Ciampa performed an Air Raid Crash on Walter from the middle rope for a nearfall. Walter performed powerbombs on Ciampa for a nearfall. Walter performed a half nelson suplex and a knife edge chop on Ciampa to retain the title.

In the penultimate match of Night 1, the vacant NXT Tag Team Championship was contested in a triple threat tag team match between Legado Del Fantasma (Joaquin Wilde and Raul Mendoza), Grizzled Young Veterans (James Drake and Zack Gibson), and Dusty Rhodes Tag Team Classic winners MSK (Wes Lee and Nash Carter). In the climax, after a very back-and-forth match, Drake and Gibson performed a Doomsday Device on Wilde. MSK performed a double stomp slam on Mendoza. Carter performed a cutter and a DDT combo on Drake and Gibson. MSK performed a Corkscrew Blockbuster on Gibson, and Lee pinned him to win the vacant titles for MSK.

==== Main event ====
In the main event of Night 1, Io Shirai defended the NXT Women's Championship against Raquel González (accompanied by Dakota Kai). After Shirai performed a crossbody on González against the barricade, Kai tried to interfere. The referee saw this and ejected her from ringside. González then dominated Shirai until Shirai countered a powerbomb. She then followed up with an armdrag, as 619, and a slingshot dropkick. Shirai then followed up with a Code Red for a nearfall. Shirai countered a powerbomb attempt by González into a crossface, but González reached the ropes to void the submission. Shirai performed a meteora on González and then followed up with a crossbody from the top of the skull. Back in the ring, Shirai performed a moonsault on González for a nearfall. In the climax, González performed a Chingona Bomb on Shirai outside the ring. Back inside, González performed a clothesline and a Chingona Bomb on Shirai to win the title.

=== Night 2 ===
==== Pre-show ====
During the Night 2 pre-show, Breezango (Tyler Breeze and Fandango) faced Drake Maverick and Killian Dain to determine the number one contenders for the NXT Tag Team Championship. In the climax, Breezango performed superkicks on Dain for a nearfall. Maverick performed a top-rope frankensteiner on Fandango. Dain powerbomed Maverick on Fandango, and Maverick pinned Fandango to earn a future title match.

==== Preliminary matches ====
Night 2 began with the ladder match between Santos Escobar and Jordan Devlin to unify the NXT Cruiserweight and NXT Interim Cruiserweight Championships. In the closing moments, Escobar and Devlin battled on top of the ladder where Escobar gave a headbutt to Devlin, sending him to another stack of ladders. Escobar then won by unhooking both the belts to become the unified Cruiserweight Champion.

After that, Ember Moon and Shotzi Blackheart defended the NXT Women's Tag Team Championship against The Way (Candice LeRae and Indi Hartwell). In the end, Moon performed an Eclipse to LeRae and Hartwell at the same time followed by Blackheart performing a Senton on Hartwell to retain the titles.

In the third match, Johnny Gargano defended the NXT North American Championship against Bronson Reed. In the climax, Reed performed an Alabama Driver and attempted a Moonsault, but Gargano moved and followed up with two One Final Beat DDTs to retain the title.

==== Main events ====
In the first of two main events of Night 2, Finn Bálor defended the NXT Championship against Karrion Kross. The match started with initial test of strength. Bálor dominated most of the match, with Kross kicking out of a Coup de Grâce. Bálor later gave Kross a double stomp and also locked in a modified Koji Clutch. However, Kross escaped the submission and then performed a Saito Suplex on Bálor followed by two Northern Forearms to win the title.

The final match of Night 2 saw Adam Cole and Kyle O'Reilly face each other in an unsanctioned match. Throughout the match, Cole and O'Reilly struck each other with various weapons in an attempt to hurt each other. The climax came when O'Reilly performed a Last Shot on Cole for a nearfall. O'Reilly went to the top rope, but Cole struck him with a steel chair. As Cole talked trash, O'Reilly performed a low blow on Cole and followed up with a diving knee with a chain wrapped around the knee to win the match. The event ended with O'Reilly stumbling on the entrance ramp and struggling to have his hand raised while Cole was being loaded onto a stretcher.

== Aftermath ==
New NXT Champion Karrion Kross (accompanied by Scarlett) opened the following episode of NXT, where he talked about his win over Finn Bálor and stated that he would be in command of NXT until he said so. He stated that everybody who tried to defeat him for the title would pay the toll in the end. After returning on the May 4 episode, Bálor vowed to fight Kross again. A title rematch was then scheduled for the May 25 episode, where Kross retained; this marked Bálor's final NXT appearance.

Also on the following episode of NXT, MSK (Wes Lee and Nash Carter) defeated Killian Dain and Drake Maverick to retain the NXT Tag Team Championship.

An exclusive video from TakeOver: Stand & Deliver aired on the following episode of NXT, with Adam Cole and Kyle O'Reilly being run down a gurney on hallways. Cole kept making loud threats during this. Following a few weeks of feuding, Cole interfered in a triple threat match involving O'Reilly to determine the number one contender for the NXT Championship at In Your House. They had two more matches; at NXT: The Great American Bash in July, Cole defeated O'Reilly, and at TakeOver 36 the following month, O'Reilly defeated Cole in a two out of three falls match in the latter's final WWE appearance.

Legado Del Fantasma (Santos Escobar, Joaquin Wilde, and Raul Mendoza) talked about Escobar's win at TakeOver: Stand & Deliver and unification of the NXT Cruiserweight Championships. Escobar issued an open challenge for the title. It was answered by Kushida, who defeated Escobar to win the title.

Dakota Kai and Raquel González talked about the latter's NXT Women's Championship win. They mentioned how great of a team they are and how great Io Shirai's reign was. They were then interrupted by Franky Monet (formerly Taya Valkyrie), making her NXT debut. Monet taunted González and Kai before being interrupted by Raw Women's Champion Rhea Ripley and SmackDown Women's Champion Bianca Belair, and the three champions hoisted their respective titles in the air.

Isaiah "Swerve" Scott and Leon Ruff had a match on the following episode of NXT where Scott was victorious. One further match was then scheduled for the May 4 episode as a Falls Count Anywhere match, which Scott won.

Also, Bronson Reed, Dexter Lumis, Ember Moon, and Shotzi Blackheart defeated The Way (NXT North American Champion Johnny Gargano, Austin Theory, and NXT Women's Tag Team Champions Candice LeRae and Indi Hartwell) in an eight-person mixed tag team match after a backstage confrontation earlier in the night. Reed then defeated Theory on the April 27 episode of NXT to earn a future NXT North American Championship match against Gargano. The match was scheduled for the May 18 episode as a Steel Cage match, which Reed won. Meanwhile, a street fight pitting Moon and Blackheart against LeRae and Hartwell for the NXT Women's Tag Team Championship was scheduled for the May 4 episode, which LeRae and Hartwell won.

In September 2021, NXT went through a restructuring, being rebranded as "NXT 2.0", reverting to a developmental brand for WWE. The NXT TakeOver series was subsequently discontinued. Although the TakeOver series was discontinued, Stand & Deliver continued on as its own event, becoming NXT's biggest annual event, as well as an annual WrestleMania week event until 2026 when it was held two weeks before WrestleMania 42. This was also the only Stand & Deliver to air as a television special and on PPV, as beginning with the following year's event, NXT's major events became only available via WWE's livestreaming platforms.

== Results ==
Night 1 (April 7)
No.	Results	Stipulations	Times
1^{P}	Zoey Stark defeated Toni Storm by pinfall	Singles match	9:52
2	Pete Dunne defeated Kushida by pinfall	Singles match	10:39
3	Bronson Reed defeated Isaiah "Swerve" Scott, Cameron Grimes, LA Knight, Dexter Lumis, and Leon Ruff	Six-man Gauntlet Eliminator match Winner received an NXT North American Championship match on Night 2.	23:14
4	Walter (c) defeated Tommaso Ciampa by pinfall	Singles match for the NXT United Kingdom Championship	16:59
5	MSK (Wes Lee and Nash Carter) defeated Grizzled Young Veterans (James Drake and Zack Gibson) and Legado Del Fantasma (Raul Mendoza and Joaquin Wilde) by pinfall	Triple threat tag team match for the vacant NXT Tag Team Championship	15:24
6	Raquel González (with Dakota Kai) defeated Io Shirai (c) by pinfall	Singles match for the NXT Women's Championship	12:56
(c) / – the champion(s) heading into the match; P / – the match was broadcast on the pre-show

Night 2 (April 8)
No.	Results	Stipulations	Times
1^{P}	Killian Dain and Drake Maverick defeated Breezango (Tyler Breeze and Fandango) by pinfall	Tag team match Winners received a future NXT Tag Team Championship match.	8:38
2	Santos Escobar (interim champion) defeated Jordan Devlin (lineal champion) by retrieving the championship belts	Ladder match to determine the undisputed NXT Cruiserweight Champion	18:08
3	Ember Moon and Shotzi Blackheart (c) defeated The Way (Candice LeRae and Indi Hartwell) by pinfall	Tag team match for the NXT Women's Tag Team Championship	10:34
4	Johnny Gargano (c) (with Austin Theory) defeated Bronson Reed by pinfall	Singles match for the NXT North American Championship	16:23
5	Karrion Kross (with Scarlett) defeated Finn Bálor (c) by pinfall	Singles match for the NXT Championship	17:05
6	Kyle O'Reilly defeated Adam Cole by pinfall	Unsanctioned match	40:19
(c) / – the champion(s) heading into the match; P / – the match was broadcast on the pre-show

=== Gauntlet Eliminator ===
Eliminated	Wrestler	Entered	Eliminated by	Method of elimination	Times
1	Leon Ruff	1	Isaiah "Swerve" Scott	Pinfall	9:45
2	Dexter Lumis	5	LA Knight	Pinned with a jackknife pin	15:50
3	LA Knight	6	Bronson Reed	Pinned after a running senton	16:00
4	Cameron Grimes	4	Isaiah "Swerve" Scott	Pinned with a roll-up	19:45
5	Isaiah "Swerve" Scott	2	Bronson Reed	Pinned after a Tsunami Splash	23:14
Winner	Bronson Reed	3	—N/a		23:14
