= Carmelo Hayes =

American professional wrestler (born 1994)

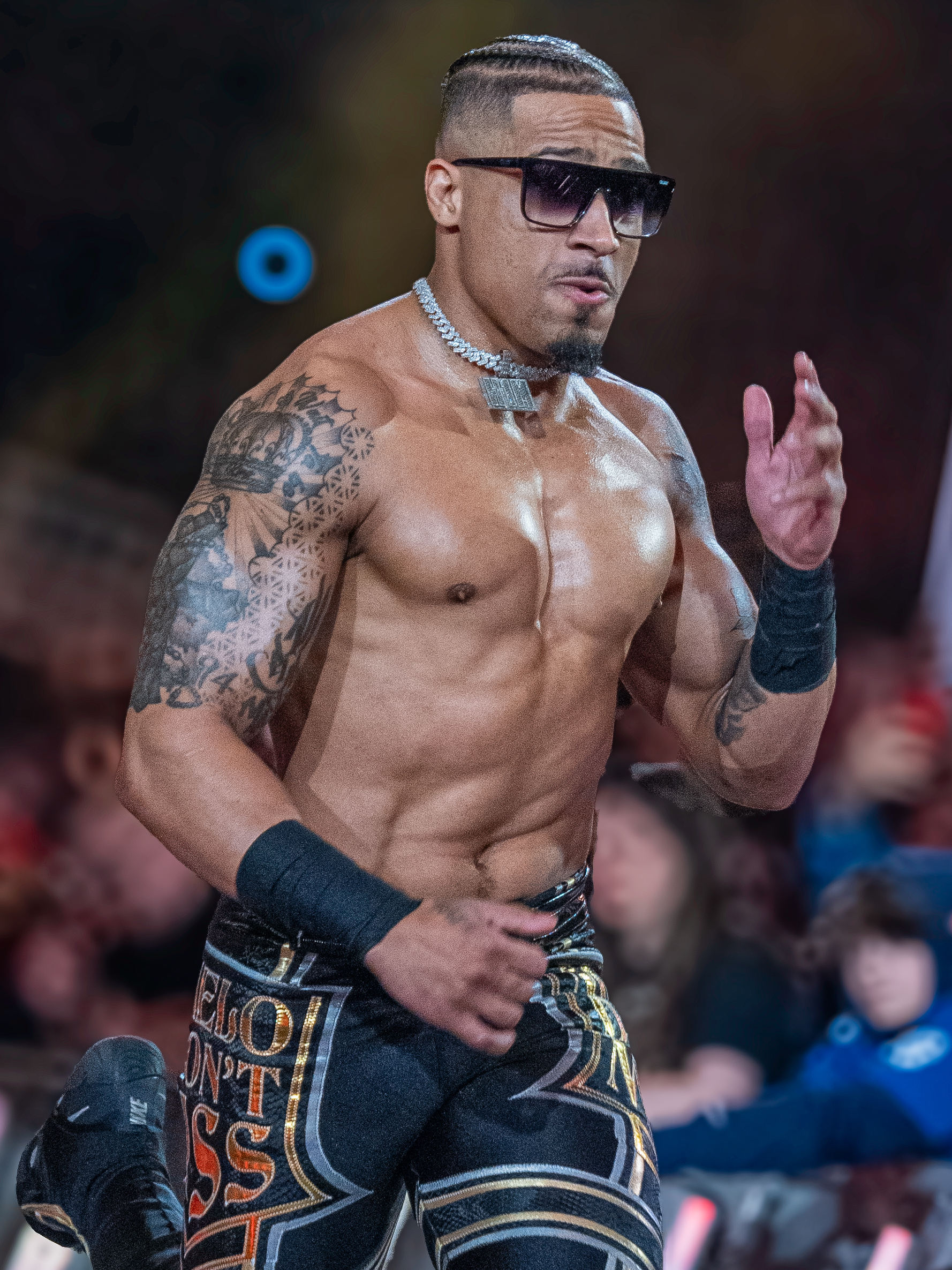
- Hayes in 2025

Personal information
- Born: Christian Brigham; August 1, 1994 (age 32) Framingham, Massachusetts, U.S.
- Spouse: Kelani Jordan (m. 2026)

Professional wrestling career
- Ring name(s): Carmelo Hayes; Christian Casanova
- Billed height: 5 ft 10 in (178 cm)
- Billed weight: 210 lb (95 kg)
- Billed from: Boston, Massachusetts
- Trained by: Brian Fury; New England Pro Wrestling Academy; WWE Performance Center
- Debut: April 12, 2014

Christian Brigham (born August 1, 1994) is an American professional wrestler. He has been signed to WWE since February 2021, where he is assigned to the SmackDown brand under the ring name Carmelo Hayes and is a member of The 946 stable.

Prior to signing with WWE, Brigham wrestled on the independent circuit, primarily in the New England region under the ring name Christian Casanova. He joined WWE in 2021 and performed on the NXT brand, where he is a former one-time NXT Champion, a two-time and record-tying longest combined reigning NXT North American Champion, a one-time and the final NXT Cruiserweight Champion (having unified it with the NXT North American Championship), and the winner of the 2021 NXT Breakout Tournament. He moved to the SmackDown brand in 2024 and became a one-time WWE United States Champion and won the 2025 André the Giant Memorial Battle Royal.

== Early life ==
Christian Brigham was born on August 1, 1994 in Framingham, Massachusetts. He graduated from Framingham High School in 2012. A fan of professional wrestling since childhood, he began training for a career at the New England Pro Wrestling Academy following his graduation.

== Professional wrestling career ==
=== Early career (2014–2021) ===
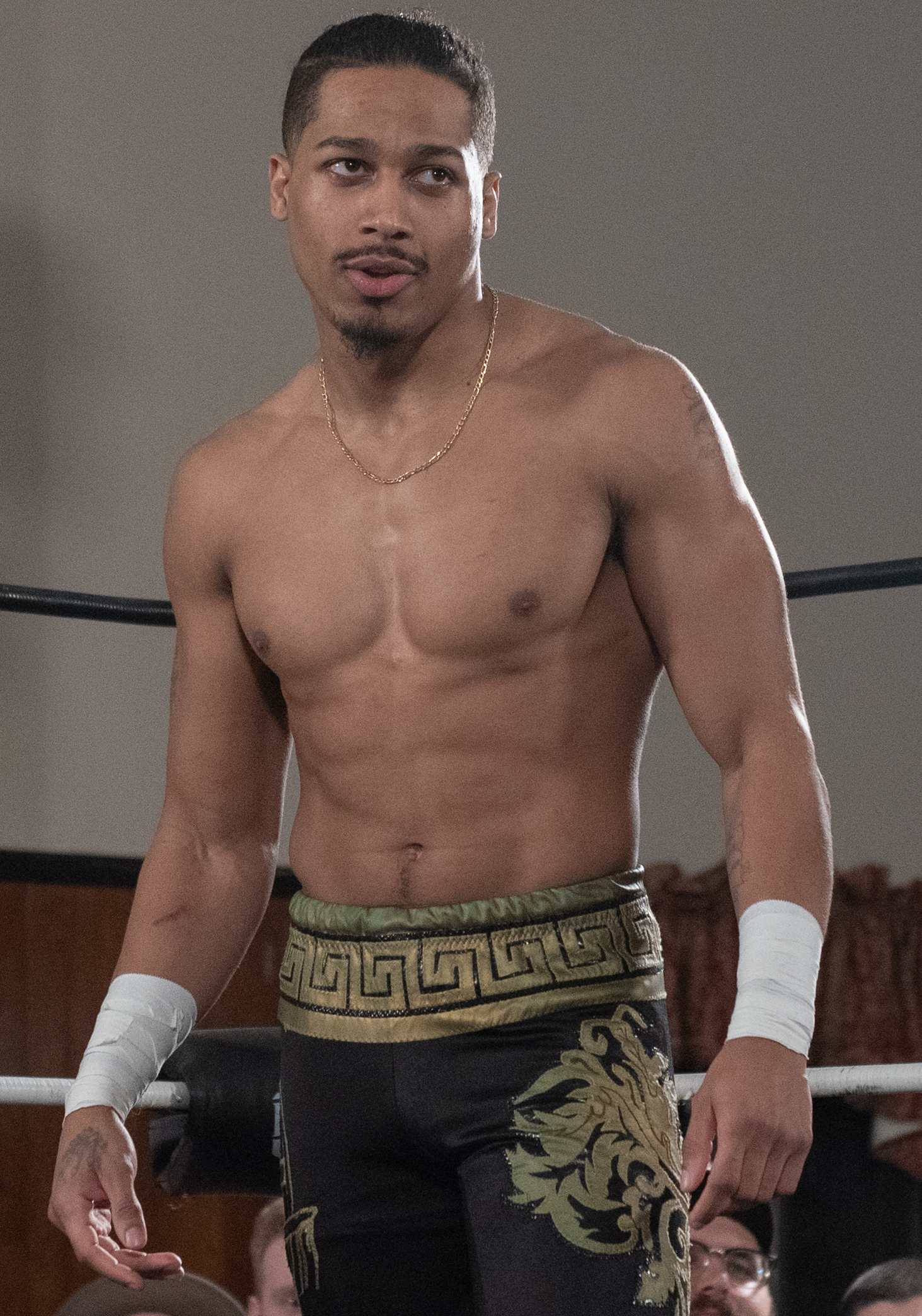
Casanova at an independent show in 2019

Brigham made his in-ring debut for Chaotic Wrestling on April 12, 2014, under the ring name Christian Casanova, losing to Mikey Webb. During his first year, he wrestled for several independent promotions including Power League Wrestling (PLW), Top Rope Promotions (TRP), Independent Wrestling Entertainment (IWE) and Lucky Pro Wrestling (LPW). On August 8, he debuted for Northeast Championship Wrestling (NCW) at NCW Big City Rumble, adopting a Michael Jackson-esque gimmick, complete with the nickname "The Thriller of New England" and using the moonwalk as one of his signature moves. On June 19, 2015, Casanova defeated Triplelicious to win the NCW New England Championship, which he lost to Scott Levesque in a triple threat match also involving Osiris on September 25.

In November 2016, Casanova began working as a heel. On March 17, 2017, he defeated Mike Verna for the Chaotic Wrestling New England Championship, but lost it to Donovan Dijak on August 4. From March to June 2018, he held the Chaotic Wrestling Tag Team Championship with Triplelicious as Killanova Inc. On March 29, 2019, Casanova defeated J. T. Dunn to win the Chaotic Wrestling Heavyweight Championship for the first time. He appeared for Ring of Honor (ROH) at Mass Hysteria on July 21, defeating Jimmy Preston. He won the title for a second time on August 30 by defeating Anthony Greene, making him the Twelfth Triple Crown Champion in Chaotic Wrestling. On October 9, 2020, Casanova and Tasha Steelz, as Culture SZN, took part in a triple threat tag team match for Game Changer Wrestling (GCW) at For The Culture, which was won by 40 Acres (PB Smooth and Tre Lamar). On December 19, Casanova won the Limitless Wrestling World Championship by winning the Vacationland Cup, but lost the title to Daniel Garcia on March 19, 2021.

=== WWE (2021–present) ===
==== NXT (2021–2024) ====
On February 12, 2021, Brigham signed a contract with WWE and was assigned to the WWE Performance Center. He made his in-ring debut as a face on the June 1 episode of NXT under the name Carmelo Hayes, accepting Kushida's open challenge for the NXT Cruiserweight Championship, but lost. He would then take part in the NXT Breakout Tournament, where he defeated Josh Briggs in the first round, Duke Hudson in the semifinals, and won the tournament by defeating Odyssey Jones in the finals and earned a contract for a championship opportunity for a title of his choosing. Following the tournament, he introduced the debuting Trick Williams as his friend and confidant during an in-ring promo, and afterwards, assisted Williams in attacking Hudson as he entered the ring, establishing both men as heels and starting an alliance known as the Trick Melo Gang.

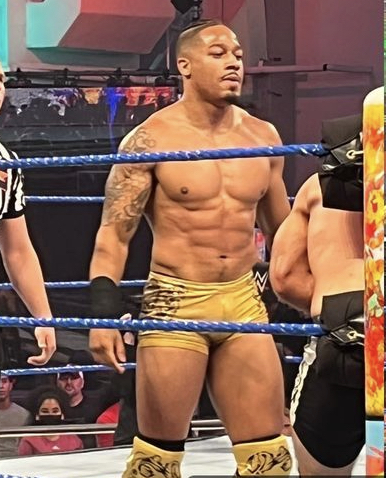
Hayes in 2022

On the October 12 episode of NXT, Hayes cashed in his Breakout Tournament contract and defeated Isaiah "Swerve" Scott to win the NXT North American Championship. At NXT WarGames on December 5, Hayes teamed with Bron Breakker, Grayson Waller and Tony D'Angelo as Team 2.0 to defeat Team Black & Gold (Johnny Gargano, LA Knight, Pete Dunne and Tommaso Ciampa) in a WarGames match. On January 4, 2022, at NXT: New Year's Evil, Hayes defeated NXT Cruiserweight Champion Roderick Strong to unify the North American Championship and the Cruiserweight Championship; he was recognized as the final Cruiserweight Champion, which was then retired, and continued as North American Champion. On February 15, he successfully defended the title against Cameron Grimes at NXT: Vengeance Day. At NXT Stand & Deliver on April 2, Hayes lost the North American Championship to Grimes in a five-way ladder match, ending his reign at 172 days, but regained it at NXT In Your House on June 4. He successfully defended the title against Waller on July 5 at NXT: The Great American Bash, Giovanni Vinci on August 16 at NXT: Heatwave, and Ricochet on September 4 at Worlds Collide, before losing it to Solo Sikoa on the September 13 episode of NXT, ending his second reign at 101 days. Hayes failed to regain the vacated title in a ladder match at NXT Halloween Havoc on October 22. He competed in the inaugural Iron Survivor Challenge at NXT Deadline on December 10, which was won by Waller.

At NXT Vengeance Day on February 4, Hayes defeated Apollo Crews in a two out of three falls match. Later that night, he and Williams confronted NXT Champion Bron Breakker following the main event. On April 1, 2023, Hayes defeated Breakker at NXT Stand & Deliver to win the NXT Championship. On the following episode of NXT, he turned face after Breakker, enraged over having lost the title, turned heel by attacking Hayes. At NXT Battleground on May 28, Hayes successfully defended the title against Breakker. Two nights later on NXT, he retained the title against Noam Dar, but was attacked by Baron Corbin after the match. Hayes wrestled his Raw debut match on June 26, where he lost to Finn Bálor in a non-title match. The following night at NXT: Gold Rush, Hayes retained the title against Corbin. At NXT The Great American Bash on July 30, he defeated Ilja Dragunov to retain the title. On the following episode of NXT, Williams told Hayes that he needed to leave and shine on his own, amicably separating the Trick Melo Gang. At NXT No Mercy on September 30, Hayes lost the NXT Championship to Dragunov in a rematch, ending his reign at 182 days.

On the October 17 episode of NXT, Trick Williams was slotted into the triple threat match between Hayes, Dijak and Corbin to make it a fatal four-way match for an NXT Championship opportunity against Dragunov at NXT: Halloween Havoc, causing a rift between Hayes and Williams. Before the match, Williams was found attacked backstage and taken to a hospital. Hayes then defeated Dijak and Corbin for the opportunity. On Night 2 of NXT: Halloween Havoc, Hayes failed to regain the title from Dragunov after being distracted by the returning Williams. On the November 21 episode of NXT, Hayes lost an Iron Survivor Challenge qualifying match after interference from Lexis King, who Hayes accused for the backstage attack on Williams. At NXT Deadline on December 9, Hayes defeated King, who subsequently denied attacking Williams. Following Deadline, he represented NXT in the WWE United States Championship #1 Contender Tournament on SmackDown, defeating Waller in the first round, but lost to Kevin Owens in the semifinals.

On January 27, 2024, at Royal Rumble, Hayes made his Royal Rumble match debut as the fifth entrant, eliminating Waller, before being eliminated by Bálor. During this time, Hayes and Williams competed in the Dusty Rhodes Tag Team Classic tournament, losing to Corbin and Breakker in the finals at NXT Vengeance Day on February 4. Later that night, after Williams failed to win the NXT Championship from Dragunov, Hayes attacked Williams with a steel chair, ending their partnership and turning heel. On the following episode of NXT, Hayes revealed that he was the one who attacked Williams back in October 2023, as he felt Williams was trying to steal his spotlight. At NXT: Roadblock on March 5, Hayes lost to Tony D'Angelo in a match to determine the number one contender to the NXT Championship at NXT Stand & Deliver after being distracted by Williams' entrance music. After the match, Hayes was attacked by the returning Williams. At NXT Stand & Deliver on April 6, Hayes lost to Williams. In a rematch on the April 16 episode of NXT, Hayes lost to Williams in a steel cage match despite assistance from his security team, ending their feud in what would be Hayes' final NXT match.

==== SmackDown (2024–2026) ====
During Night 1 of the 2024 WWE Draft on the April 26 episode of SmackDown, Hayes was drafted to the SmackDown brand as the third overall draft pick. He then challenged Undisputed WWE Champion Cody Rhodes to a match as his first opponent as a main roster wrestler, which he lost. Hayes participated in the King of the Ring tournament and the Money in the Bank ladder match at the titular event on July 6, but did not win either. After Money in the Bank, Hayes began a feud with fellow Money in the Bank competitor Andrade, with the pair having won three matches each against each other by the end of September. On the October 25 episode of SmackDown, Hayes and Andrade's game seven match, which was also for a United States Championship opportunity, ended in a no contest after special guest referee and reigning champion LA Knight attacked both men, ending their best-of-seven series match at three wins, three losses and one draw each. This led to a triple threat match for the title at Crown Jewel on November 2, which Hayes lost after being pinned by Knight. At Royal Rumble on February 1, 2025, Hayes entered the titular match at number 4, but was eliminated by Bron Breakker. Afterwards, Hayes attacked Akira Tozawa, causing him to be replaced in the Royal Rumble match by celebrity entrant IShowSpeed.

On the February 21 episode of SmackDown, Hayes formed a partnership with The Miz dubbed "Melo Don't Miz" (a portmanteau of Hayes' catchphrase "Melo Don't Miss" and The Miz), where they defeated LA Knight and R-Truth in their first match together. He won the André the Giant Memorial Battle Royal on the April 18 episode of SmackDown, last eliminating Andrade. On the September 16 episode of NXT: Homecoming, Hayes and Trick Williams reunited for one night only to defeat #DIY (Johnny Gargano and Tommaso Ciampa) with the help of The Miz. On the September 26 episode of SmackDown, during a tag team match against The Street Profits (Angelo Dawkins and Montez Ford), after Miz tried to take the glory and tag himself in, Hayes cut him off, causing them to lose the match. The following week on SmackDown, Hayes was attacked by The Miz as he was about to accept United States Champion Sami Zayn's open challenge for the title, turning face in the process.

On the December 19 taping of SmackDown, Hayes defeated United States Champion Ilja Dragunov in an open challenge to win his first title on the main roster. WWE officially began recognizing this reign when the episode aired on tape delay on December 26. Hayes would successfully defend the title in open challenges against the likes of Johnny Gargano, Shinsuke Nakamura, Ilja Dragunov (twice), Leon Slater, Rey Fénix, Matt Cardona, and El Hijo de Dr. Wagner Jr.. Hayes then lost the United States Championship to Sami Zayn in an open challenge on the March 27, 2026 episode of SmackDown, ending his reign at 98 days (91 days as recognized by WWE due to tape delay).

==== The 946 (2026–present) ====
After months of inactivity, Hayes returned on the October 12, 2026 episode of Raw as the newest member of The 946, helping his new stablemates attack The Usos (Jey Uso and Jimmy Uso) and Solo Sikoa, turning heel in the process.

== Other media ==
Brigham, as Carmelo Hayes, made his video game debut as a playable character in WWE 2K23 and has since appeared in WWE 2K24, WWE 2K25, and WWE 2K26.

== Personal life ==
On July 5, 2025, Brigham announced his engagement to fellow professional wrestler Lea Mitchell, professionally known as Kelani Jordan. The couple were married on October 17, 2026, in Miami.

== Championships and accomplishments ==
- Beyond Wrestling
  - Pride of New England Tournament for Tomorrow (2019)
- Chaotic Wrestling
  - Chaotic Wrestling Heavyweight Championship (2 times)
  - Chaotic Wrestling New England Championship (1 time)
  - Chaotic Wrestling Tag Team Championship (1 time) – with Tripilicious
  - Twelfth Triple Crown Champion
- ESPN
  - Ranked No. 7 of the 30 best Pro Wrestlers Under 30 in 2023
- Liberty States Pro Wrestling
  - Liberty States Heavyweight Championship (1 time)
- Limitless Wrestling
  - Limitless Wrestling World Championship (1 time)
  - Vacationland Cup (2020)
- Lucky Pro Wrestling
  - LPW Tag Team Championship (1 time) – with Elia Markopoulos
- Northeast Championship Wrestling
  - NCW New England Championship (1 time)
  - Rookie of the Year (2014)
  - Most Popular (2015)
- Northeast Wrestling
  - NEW Live Championship (1 time, inaugural)
- Pro Wrestling Illustrated
  - Ranked No. 13 of the top 500 singles wrestlers in the PWI 500 in 2023
- WWE
  - WWE United States Championship (1 time)
  - NXT Championship (1 time)
  - NXT North American Championship (2 times)
  - NXT Cruiserweight Championship (1 time, final)
  - André the Giant Memorial Battle Royal (2025)
  - NXT Breakout Tournament (2021)
  - NXT Year-End Award
    - Match of the Year (2023) vs. Ilja Dragunov at NXT No Mercy
