= WrestleMania 32 =

2016 WWE pay-per-view and livestreaming event

- Promotional poster featuring Triple H and Roman Reigns
- Promotion: WWE
- Date: April 3, 2016
- City: Arlington, Texas
- Venue: AT&T Stadium
- Attendance: 80,709
- Buy rate: 100,000 (estimated; excluding WWE Network views)

WWE event chronology
← Previous; NXT TakeOver: Dallas	Next → Payback

WrestleMania chronology
← Previous; 31	Next → 33

WrestleMania 32 was a 2016 professional wrestling pay-per-view (PPV) and livestreaming event produced by WWE. It was the 32nd annual WrestleMania and took place on April 3, 2016, at the AT&T Stadium in the Dallas suburb of Arlington, Texas. This was the last WrestleMania held before the reintroduction of the brand extension in July, which introduced another world championship, the WWE Universal Championship, thus it was also the last WrestleMania to feature one world championship. It was also the third WrestleMania to be held in the U.S. state of Texas, after WrestleMania X-Seven in 2001 and WrestleMania 25 in 2009.

Twelve matches were contested at the event, including three on the Kickoff pre-show. Four matches were particularly considered to be the marquee attractions. In the main event, Roman Reigns defeated Triple H to win the WWE World Heavyweight Championship. In other prominent matches, The Undertaker defeated Shane McMahon in a Hell in a Cell match, Brock Lesnar defeated Dean Ambrose in a No Holds Barred Street Fight, and Charlotte defeated Becky Lynch and Sasha Banks to win the inaugural WWE Women's Championship, which replaced the WWE Divas Championship that Charlotte held going into the event and had been retired during the Kickoff show. The event was also notable for having the shortest WrestleMania match ever, when The Rock defeated Erick Rowan in an impromptu match. The André the Giant Memorial Battle Royal included the surprise participation of former National Basketball Association player Shaquille O'Neal; the match was won by NXT's Baron Corbin in his main roster debut.

According to WWE, WrestleMania 32 set multiple records for the company, including grossing US$17.3 million and a claimed attendance record of 101,763. However, independent reports listed an attendance of 80,709, making it the third most attended wrestling event in the history of the medium. WWE Chairman Vince McMahon later admitted the attendance record "wasn't 101,000 paid" as it included "ushers and ticket takers and all of that".

Despite its commercial success, critics gave mixed-to-negative reviews for WrestleMania 32, and rated it worse than the NXT TakeOver: Dallas event WWE held two days prior. Praise went towards the opening ladder match, AJ Styles vs. Chris Jericho, and the Women's Championship match; criticism was focused on the main event, Ambrose vs. Lesnar, the Hell in a Cell match, the overall length of the event, and what were seen as questionable booking decisions, which were focused on the amount of heel victories outside of the opening match and main event. The show was voted as the "Worst Major Wrestling Show" of 2016 in the Wrestling Observer Newsletter Awards, and readers of WrestleCrap, which chronicles the worst moments in professional wrestling, gave it the Gooker Award for the worst wrestling event of any kind in 2016. The main event title match drew particular criticism and resulted in negative and angry crowd reactions.

== Production ==
=== Background ===
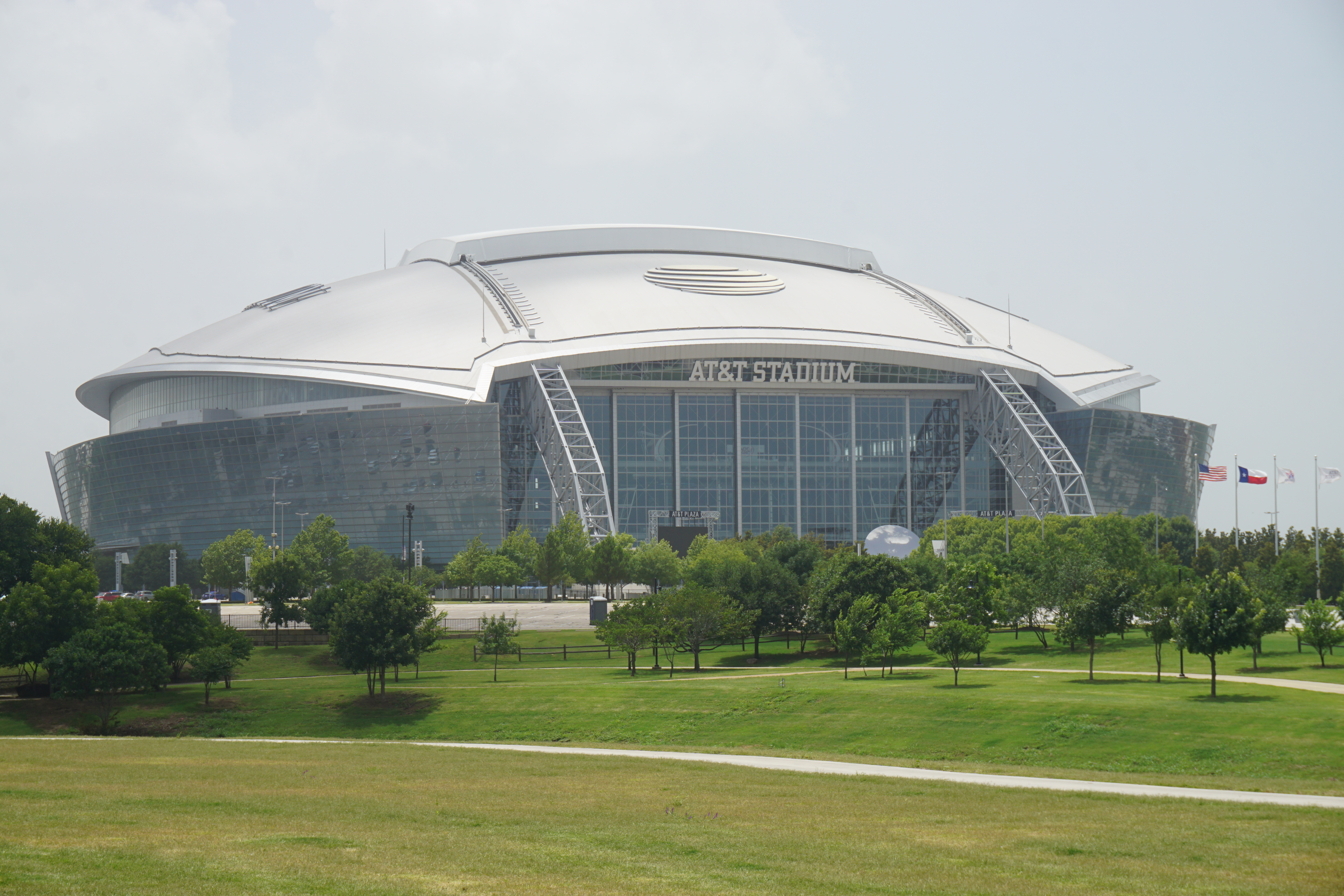
The 32nd annual WrestleMania was held at the AT&T Stadium in Arlington, Texas.

WrestleMania is WWE's flagship professional wrestling pay-per-view (PPV) and livestreaming event, having first been held in 1985. It was the company's first pay-per-view produced and was also WWE's first major event available via livestreaming when the company launched the WWE Network in February 2014. It is the longest-running professional wrestling event in history and is held annually between mid-March to mid-April. It was the first of WWE's original four pay-per-views, which includes Royal Rumble, SummerSlam, and Survivor Series, referred to as the "Big Four". The event has been described as the Super Bowl of sports entertainment. Much like the Super Bowl, cities bid for the right to host each year's edition of WrestleMania. As part of bidding process, Texas offered WWE US$2.7 million in subsidies.

Announced on January 20, 2015, WrestleMania 32 was scheduled to be held on April 3, 2016, at the AT&T Stadium in the Dallas suburb of Arlington, Texas. It was the third WrestleMania to be held in the U.S. state of Texas (following X-Seven in 2001 and XXV in 2009) and the first to take place in the Dallas–Fort Worth metroplex area. Tickets went on sale on November 6, 2015, with individual tickets costing from $18 to $2,360. On October 13, 2015, traveling packages with accommodation ranging from $575 to $6,625 per person were sold. Dave Meltzer of the Wrestling Observer Newsletter reported that WrestleMania 32 broke WWE's record for most tickets sold with at least 84,000 tickets sold.

Jesse Lawrence of Forbes speculated that WrestleMania 32 could break the WWE attendance record of 93,173 set at WrestleMania III at the Pontiac Silverdome in Pontiac, Michigan. This record stood as the highest attendance for any indoor event until the 2010 NBA All-Star Game, also held at AT&T Stadium, drew 108,713. However, Meltzer reported that the actual WWE attendance record before WrestleMania 32 was the 1992 SummerSlam's 79,127, and that WrestleMania III's actual attendance was around 78,000.

The five official theme songs for the event were "My House" by Flo Rida, "Hello Friday" by Flo Rida featuring Jason Derulo, "Hail to the King" by Avenged Sevenfold, "Sympathy for the Devil" by Motörhead, and "Oh No" by Goodbye June. On March 21, 2016, it was announced that the American girl group Fifth Harmony would be performing "America the Beautiful" during the WrestleMania 32 Kickoff pre-show.

WWE had been hobbled by real-life injuries of its wrestlers, rendering them unable to perform at WrestleMania 32. The injured list at the time included John Cena, Seth Rollins, Randy Orton, Cesaro, Neville, and Luke Harper. Meanwhile, Sting, Nikki Bella, and Tyson Kidd suffered neck injuries, with Kidd barely avoiding paralysis or death and Sting being forced to retire. Daniel Bryan was also forced to retire due to severe concussions. David Shoemaker, writing for ESPN, described that "it seems as if the talent left off the match lineup could sell more tickets than the one currently on it". Shoemaker also theorized possible reasons for injuries being firstly "WWE's grueling schedule", and secondly "the travel, the exhaustion, the lack of an offseason".

In March 2016, Daniel Van Doom of CNET wrote that WrestleMania 32 would see the culmination of "the biggest story in WWE", which is "establishing Roman Reigns as the top babyface". WWE's attempts to get Reigns the "level of recognition" of names like Hulk Hogan, "Stone Cold" Steve Austin, The Rock, and John Cena met its "toughest opponent" in the wrestling audience which started a "fan rebellion" in opposition to WWE's support of Reigns, with fans preferring Dean Ambrose instead. COED agreed that Reigns, whom WWE thought "has the most star power and wide-spread appeal", was "being feverishly rejected" with boos by WWE's audience. To combat this trend, WWE took measures including muting booing crowds and piping in canned cheers during Reigns's appearances in 2016. Kyle Fowle of The A.V. Club commented that "WWE has a serious Roman Reigns problem", due to "basically nobody wanting to see Roman Reigns in the main event" of WrestleMania.

=== Celebrity involvement ===
As is tradition at WrestleMania, the show included appearances by numerous celebrity guests. Fifth Harmony, who performed "America the Beautiful" at the start of WrestleMania 32, Maria Menounos served as a backstage interviewer, and Snoop Dogg – who the night before was inducted into the celebrity wing of the WWE Hall of Fame – performed a live version for his cousin Sasha Banks' entrance theme as he accompanied her to the ring for her match.

Joan Lunden was recognized as part of the 2016's WWE Hall of Fame class, as she won the Warrior Award for her public battle with breast cancer. National Basketball Association (NBA) player Shaquille O'Neal was a surprise participant in the André the Giant Memorial Battle Royal, eliminating Damien Sandow and having a standoff with fellow seven-footer Big Show before both of them were eliminated by about 10 other wrestlers, before Baron Corbin eliminated Kane to win the battle royal. The Dallas Cowboys Cheerleaders also made an appearance as part of The Rock's entrance to the ring.

=== Storylines ===
The event comprised 12 matches, including three on the Kickoff pre-show, that resulted from scripted storylines. Results were predetermined by WWE's writers, while storylines were produced on WWE's weekly television shows, Raw and SmackDown.

The storylines leading into WrestleMania 32 were not received well by critics. Jason Powell of Pro Wrestling Dot Net lamented that "the build to WrestleMania has been a creative mess", and that WWE's injury-hit roster does not excuse "sloppy booking or storylines with massive holes and logic gaps". Josh Hamlin of the Wrestling Observer Newsletter criticized, "There is no momentum for WrestleMania at all. The event sells itself purely on its brand name". Ben Tucker of Pro Wrestling Torch wrote, "Not since WrestleMania 13 has WWE's Super Bowl come together in such a bizarre fashion, with WWE making some of the most head-scratching decisions I've seen in ages". Kyle Fowle of The A.V. Club declared that WWE's "ship is headed straight for the rocks", and in particular "the WWE World Heavyweight Championship feud is a disaster".

==== Main event match ====
At Survivor Series, Roman Reigns won a tournament for the vacant WWE World Heavyweight Championship. Reigns had earlier refused offers by Triple H to join The Authority, which would have automatically placed him in the tournament final, but Reigns fought in the whole tournament and after his victory, he speared Triple H, who tried to congratulate him. Sheamus then cashed in his Money in the Bank contract after a Brogue Kick and won the title. At TLC: Tables, Ladders and Chairs the next month, Reigns faced Sheamus in a TLC match, but lost when Alberto Del Rio and Rusev interfered. Post-match, Reigns attacked Sheamus, Del Rio, Rusev, and then Triple H with a chair. The next night on Raw, Reigns regained the title from Sheamus in a title vs. career match. Vince McMahon then forced Reigns to defend the title in the annual 30-man Royal Rumble match at the Royal Rumble event with Reigns entering at #1. At the Royal Rumble, Triple H returned as the #30 entrant and eliminated Reigns en route to winning the WWE World Heavyweight Championship. At Fastlane, Reigns defeated Dean Ambrose and Brock Lesnar in a triple threat match to face Triple H for the WWE World Heavyweight Championship at WrestleMania. The following night on Raw, Triple H attacked Reigns during the latter's match against Sheamus and beat a bloodied Reigns and executed a Pedigree on Reigns onto the steel steps. However, Reigns returned on the March 14 episode of Raw and assaulted Triple H.

==== Undercard matches ====
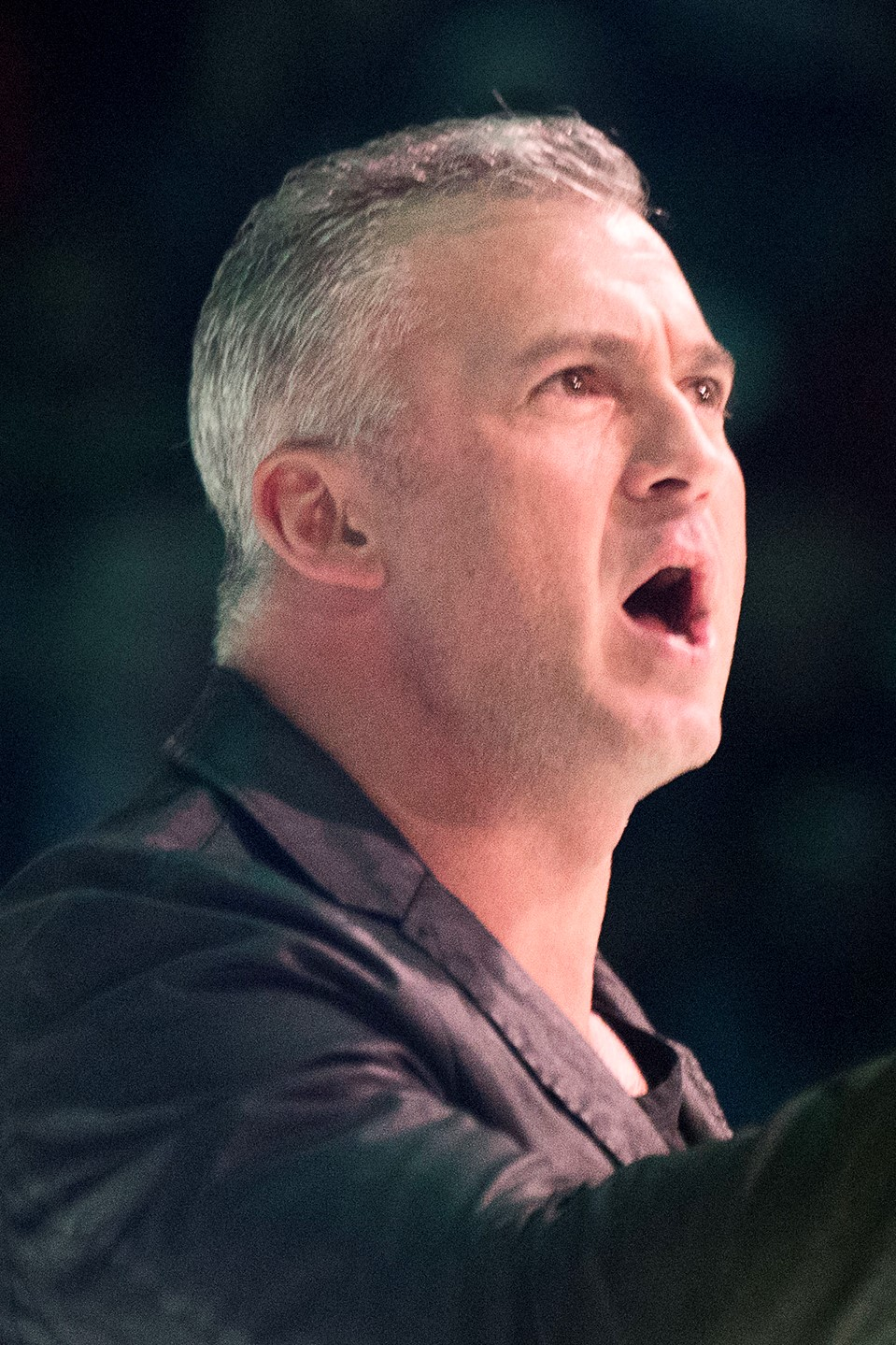
Shane McMahon faced The Undertaker inside Hell in a Cell for control of Monday Night Raw in a losing effort.

On the February 22 episode of Raw, Mr. McMahon presented the "Vincent J. McMahon Legacy of Excellence" Award to his daughter Stephanie McMahon. As Stephanie was about to do the acceptance speech about the award given to her, Shane McMahon returned to WWE for the first time since 2009, to confront his father and sister in regards to his role in the company. Vince then made a deal with Shane that he would gain control of Raw if he could win a match of his choosing but would relinquish a lockbox of Vince's secrets if he lost. After Shane accepted, Vince named The Undertaker as his opponent and made the match a Hell in a Cell match; Shane's last match was in May 2009. The following week, Undertaker returned to Raw and said that Shane's blood would be on Vince's hands, not his. Vince stated that if The Undertaker did not win, it would be his last WrestleMania.

During the closing moments of the triple threat match at Fastlane, Brock Lesnar applied the kimura lock on Roman Reigns, only for Dean Ambrose to attack Lesnar with a chair at the last minute; this incapacitated Lesnar long enough for Reigns to defeat Ambrose. The next day before Raw aired, Lesnar attacked Ambrose and was taken to the hospital in an ambulance. On Raw, Paul Heyman issued a challenge to anyone on the roster to face Lesnar at WrestleMania. Ambrose returned in the ambulance to challenge Lesnar to a No Holds Barred Street Fight; Heyman accepted on Lesnar's behalf. On the March 14 episode of Raw, hardcore legend Mick Foley gave Ambrose his signature barbed wire baseball bat. The next week on Raw, another hardcore legend, Terry Funk, gave Ambrose a chainsaw.

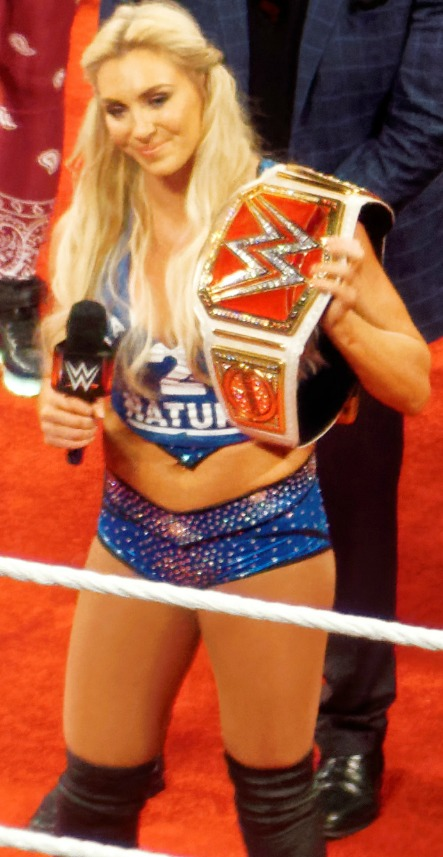
Charlotte (pictured) defeated Becky Lynch and Sasha Banks in a triple threat match to win the inaugural WWE Women's Championship (on her shoulder); the match was originally for Charlotte's WWE Divas Championship, but during the WrestleMania 32 pre-show, the Divas title was retired and replaced by the Women's Championship.

After controversially defeating Becky Lynch at the Royal Rumble to retain the WWE Divas Championship, Charlotte was ambushed by a returning Sasha Banks. On the February 29 episode of Raw, Lynch and Banks fought in a No. 1 Contender's match, but the match ended in a double pin. A rematch on the next episode of SmackDown ended in a no contest when Charlotte attacked both women. Subsequently, Charlotte was scheduled to defend her title against both women in a triple threat match at WrestleMania.

On the February 8 episode of Raw, after defeating The New Day (Kofi Kingston, Xavier Woods, and Big E) and Mark Henry in a tag team tables match, The Dudley Boyz (Bubba Ray Dudley and D-Von Dudley) turned heel and betrayed their teammates The Usos (Jey Uso and Jimmy Uso). Explaining that they did not come back to WWE to be a "nostalgia act" and reminding the fans that they are "the baddest tag team on the planet", The Dudley Boyz abandoned using their trademark tables. In the following weeks, The Usos saved wrestlers from post-match beatdowns by The Dudley Boyz, setting up a tag team match between the two teams for the event. The match was later moved to the WrestleMania 32 Kickoff pre-show.

During the 'Cutting Edge Peep Show at Fastlane, WWE Tag Team Champions The New Day (Kofi Kingston, Xavier Woods, and Big E) showed signs of a face turn by mocking The League of Nations (Sheamus, King Barrett, Alberto Del Rio, and Rusev). Over the next few weeks, The New Day continued to mock The League of Nations in backstage segments. At Roadblock, The New Day retained the WWE Tag Team Championship against League of Nations members Sheamus and King Barrett. The New Day then defeated fellow League of Nations members Del Rio and Rusev the following night on Raw to retain the championships, causing The League of Nations to attack The New Day during the post-match and turning The New Day face, leading to a six-man tag team match between Sheamus, Del Rio, and Rusev and The New Day at WrestleMania.

After walking out on Big Show and Kane during their six-man tag team rematch against The Wyatt Family, causing them to lose, on the February 22 episode of Raw, Ryback became more aggressive by defeating his opponents in squash matches. On March 14 episode of Raw, after defeating Sin Cara, Ryback challenged United States Champion Kalisto to a match for the United States Championship at WrestleMania, which Kalisto accepted two days later in an interview with Michael Cole. The match was later moved to the WrestleMania 32 Kickoff pre-show.

After weeks of feuding between each other, The Miz, Dolph Ziggler, and Sami Zayn confronted Intercontinental Champion Kevin Owens on the March 21 episode of Raw and challenged him for the title. Owens agreed to talk to The Authority about setting up a number one contender triple threat match for a shot at his title, but the match instead included Zack Ryder, Sin Cara, and Stardust. Miz, Ziggler, and Zayn all interfered in the match, which ended in no contest. Stephanie McMahon then set up a ladder match for the title at WrestleMania, with Owens defending the title against all six competitors.

After AJ Styles defeated Chris Jericho at Fastlane, both men in respect and formed a tag team known as "Y2AJ" and dominated the tag team division by defeating champions The New Day in two consecutive matches, leading to Y2AJ challenging them to a match for the WWE Tag Team Championship. However, Y2AJ failed to win the championships against The New Day on March 7 episode of Raw after Jericho was pinned by Big E. After the match, Jericho attacked Styles with three Codebreakers, turning heel in the process. Jericho stated that he was tired of the fans chanting for Styles and not him. Styles then challenged Jericho to a match at WrestleMania which Jericho refused, stating he would rather sit with the crowd at WrestleMania rather than face him. On the March 28 episode of Raw, during Jericho's match with Zack Ryder, Styles distracted Jericho, causing Ryder to beat Jericho. Then, Jericho accepted Styles's challenge.

On the March 14 episode of Raw, Lana allied with Team B.A.D. (Naomi and Tamina) by helping them defeat Brie Bella and Alicia Fox. Lana then attacked Paige after the latter's victory over Summer Rae two days later on Main Event. On the following episode of Main Event, during a match between Paige and Naomi, Rae and Emma attacked Fox and Natalya (in Paige's corner at ringside), allowing Naomi to win. On the March 28 episode of Raw, Emma (accompanied by Naomi, Tamina, Lana, and Rae) defeated Paige (accompanied by Brie, Fox, and Natalya). Following the match, Eva Marie allied with Brie, Paige, Fox, and Natalya. Subsequently, a ten-woman tag team match between the two teams was scheduled for the WrestleMania 32 Kickoff pre-show.

== Event ==
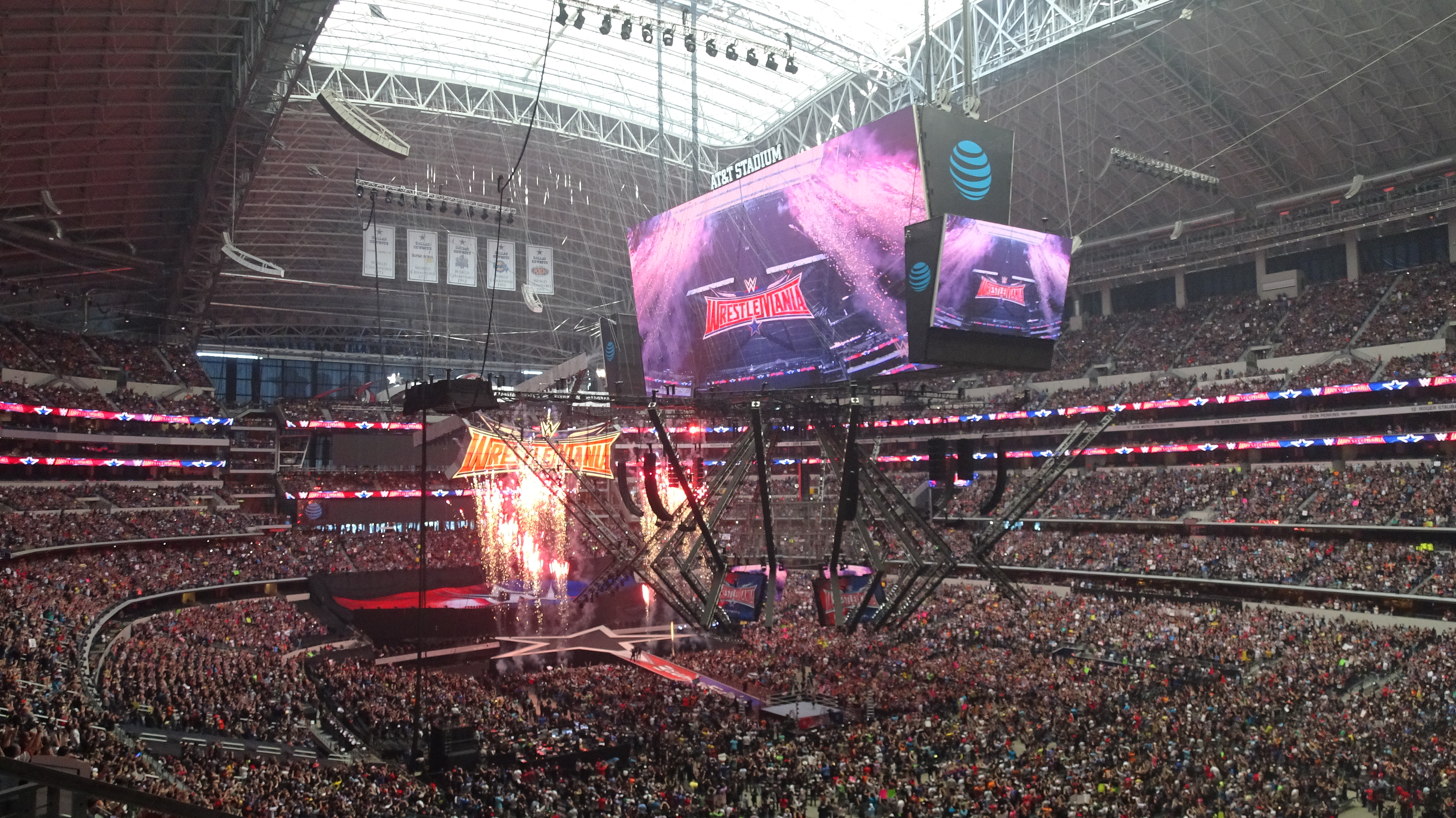
AT&T Stadium during WrestleMania 32

Other on-screen personnel
Role:	Name:
English commentators	Michael Cole (Main show)
English commentators	John "Bradshaw" Layfield (Main show)
English commentators	Byron Saxton (All matches)
English commentators	Mauro Ranallo (Pre-show)
English commentators	Jerry Lawler (Pre-show)
German commentators	Sebastian Hackl
German commentators	Carsten Schaefer
Portuguese commentators	Marco Alfaro
Portuguese commentators	Roberto Figueroa
Spanish commentators	Carlos Cabrera
Spanish commentators	Marcelo Rodriguez
Interviewers	JoJo
Interviewers	Maria Menounos
Ring announcers	Lillian Garcia
Ring announcers	Eden Stiles
Ring announcers	Howard Finkel (WWE Hall of Fame)
Referees	Mike Chioda
Referees	John Cone
Referees	Jason Ayers
Referees	Rod Zapata
Referees	Charles Robinson
Referees	Dan Engler
Referees	Darrick Moore
Referees	Ryan Tran
Referees	Chad Patton
Pre-show panel	Renee Young
Pre-show panel	Booker T
Pre-show panel	Corey Graves
Pre-show panel	Tom Phillips
Pre-show panel	Cathy Kelley
Pre-show panel	Lita

=== Pre-show ===
Three matches were contested on the two-hour long WrestleMania 32 Kickoff pre-show, which was broadcast on the WWE Network, WWE.com, Facebook, Google+, Pinterest, and YouTube, with USA Network joining the live coverage for the second hour. In the first match, Kalisto defended the WWE United States Championship against Ryback. Kalisto won after executing a Salida Del Sol on Ryback, who had collided with an exposed turnbuckle.

In the second match, a 10-women tag team match pitted Team Total Divas (Alicia Fox, Brie Bella, Eva Marie, Natalya, and Paige) against Team B.A.D. & Blonde (Emma, Lana, Naomi, Summer Rae, and Tamina). Bella won the match for Team Total Divas by making Naomi submit to the Yes! Lock. Nikki Bella, who was inactive due to a neck injury, came out to celebrate with her sister and the rest of the team.

Next, WWE Hall of Famer Lita introduced a new WWE Women's Championship to replace the WWE Divas Championship, and revealed that the winner of the triple threat match between Charlotte, Becky Lynch, and Sasha Banks later that night would be awarded the title.

Finally, The Usos (Jey Uso and Jimmy Uso) defeated The Dudley Boyz (Bubba Ray Dudley and D-Von Dudley) in a tag team match after The Usos performed a double Superkick on D-Von. After the match, The Usos performed Samoan Splashes through tables on The Dudley Boyz.

=== Preliminary matches ===
The actual pay-per-view opened with the Ladder match for the WWE Intercontinental Championship, with Stardust, Zack Ryder, Kevin Owens, Sami Zayn, Sin Cara, The Miz, and Dolph Ziggler as the participants. Stardust used a black ladder with yellow polka dots to tribute his late father Dusty Rhodes, but that ladder was disposed of by Owens. Mid-match, Ziggler executed a series of superkicks, while Ryder performed an elbow drop off a ladder onto The Miz. In the climax, Owens powerbombed Ziggler off a ladder, then caused Sin Cara to fall off a ladder onto Stardust, who was lying on a ladder bridged between the ring apron and barricade. Owen's rival Zayn took out Owens with a half and half suplex onto a ladder and was in turn incapacitated by The Miz. Premature celebrations by The Miz allowed Ryder to shove him off a ladder and retrieve the belt to win the match. Post-match, Ryder's father joined Ryder in the ring for a celebration.

Next, Chris Jericho took on AJ Styles. After an evenly contested match (which saw Styles kick out of Jericho's Codebreaker, and Jericho kick out of Styles's Styles Clash), Jericho hid behind the referee and countered Styles's Phenomenal Forearm into a mid-air Codebreaker to win the match.

After that, The New Day (Big E, Kofi Kingston, and Xavier Woods), who entered by coming out of a huge "Booty-O's" cereal box (while wearing Dragon Ball Z-inspired attire, with Woods's outfit modeled after Vegeta), then wrestled The League of Nations (Sheamus, Alberto Del Rio, and Rusev) in a six-man tag team match, with League teammate King Barrett at ringside. The League of Nations won the match following a Bull Hammer by Barrett to Woods when the referee was distracted and a Brogue Kick by Sheamus on Woods. After the match, Barrett bragged that no three men could beat the League of Nations. WWE Hall of Famers Shawn Michaels, Mick Foley, and Stone Cold Steve Austin, then came down and cleared the ring of The League of Nations. Austin then performed a Stunner on Woods, who had tried to persuade the Hall of Famers to dance with him.

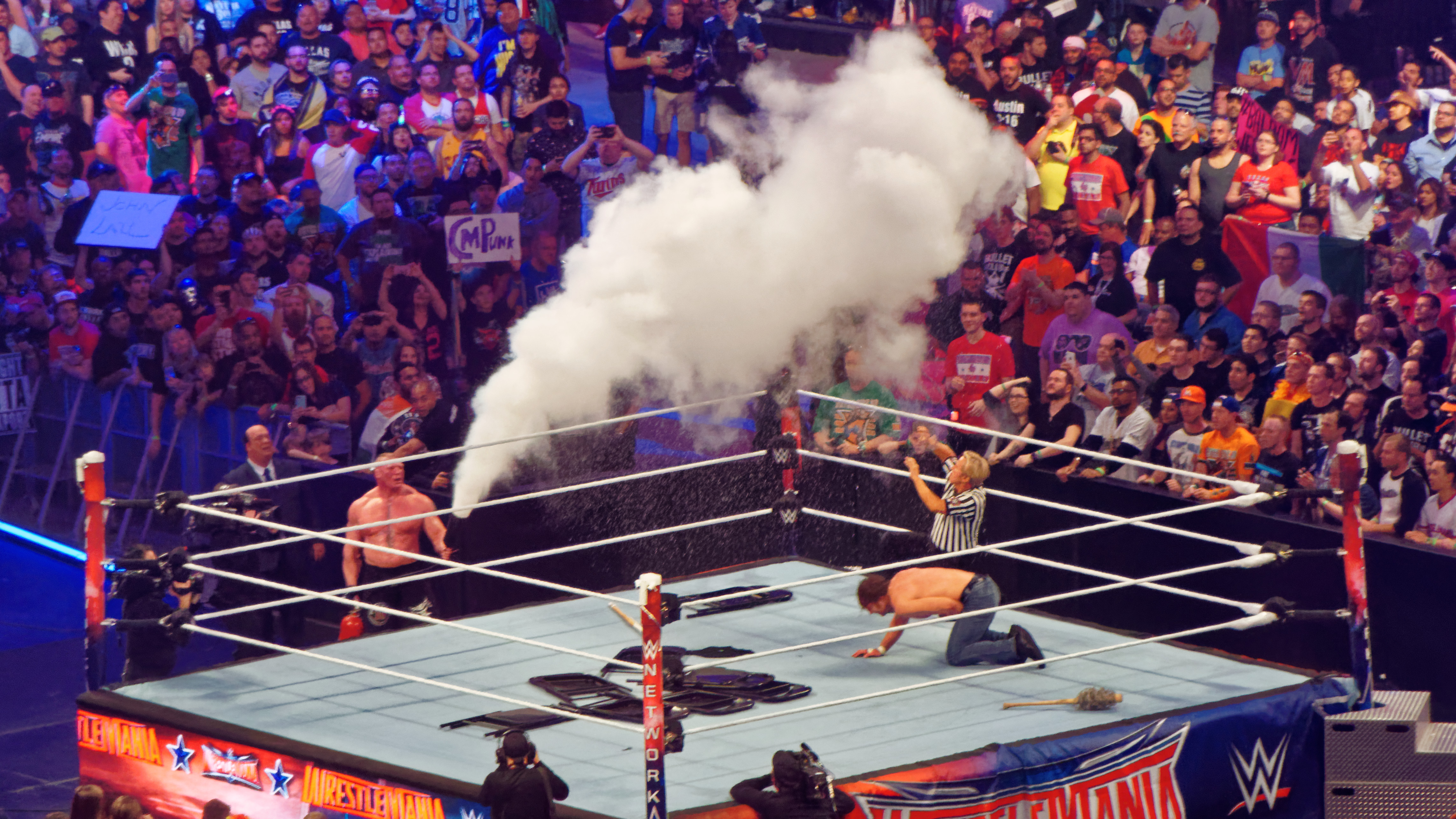
Brock Lesnar and Dean Ambrose after their match at WrestleMania 32

Next was the No Holds Barred Street Fight between Brock Lesnar (accompanied by Paul Heyman) and Dean Ambrose. Lesnar executed thirteen suplexes on Ambrose, while Ambrose used kendo sticks and chairs to try to keep Lesnar down. Ambrose also attempted to use a chainsaw, which did not start. After Ambrose threw numerous chairs in the ring, Lesnar attempted an F-5, only for Ambrose to counter and execute Dirty Deeds on Lesnar onto the pile of chairs for a near fall. In the end, Ambrose brought in a barbed wire-wrapped baseball bat to finish Lesnar off, however, Lesnar delivered a German suplex and an F-5 on Ambrose on the pile of chairs to win the match. Afterwards, Lesnar sprayed Ambrose with a fire extinguisher.

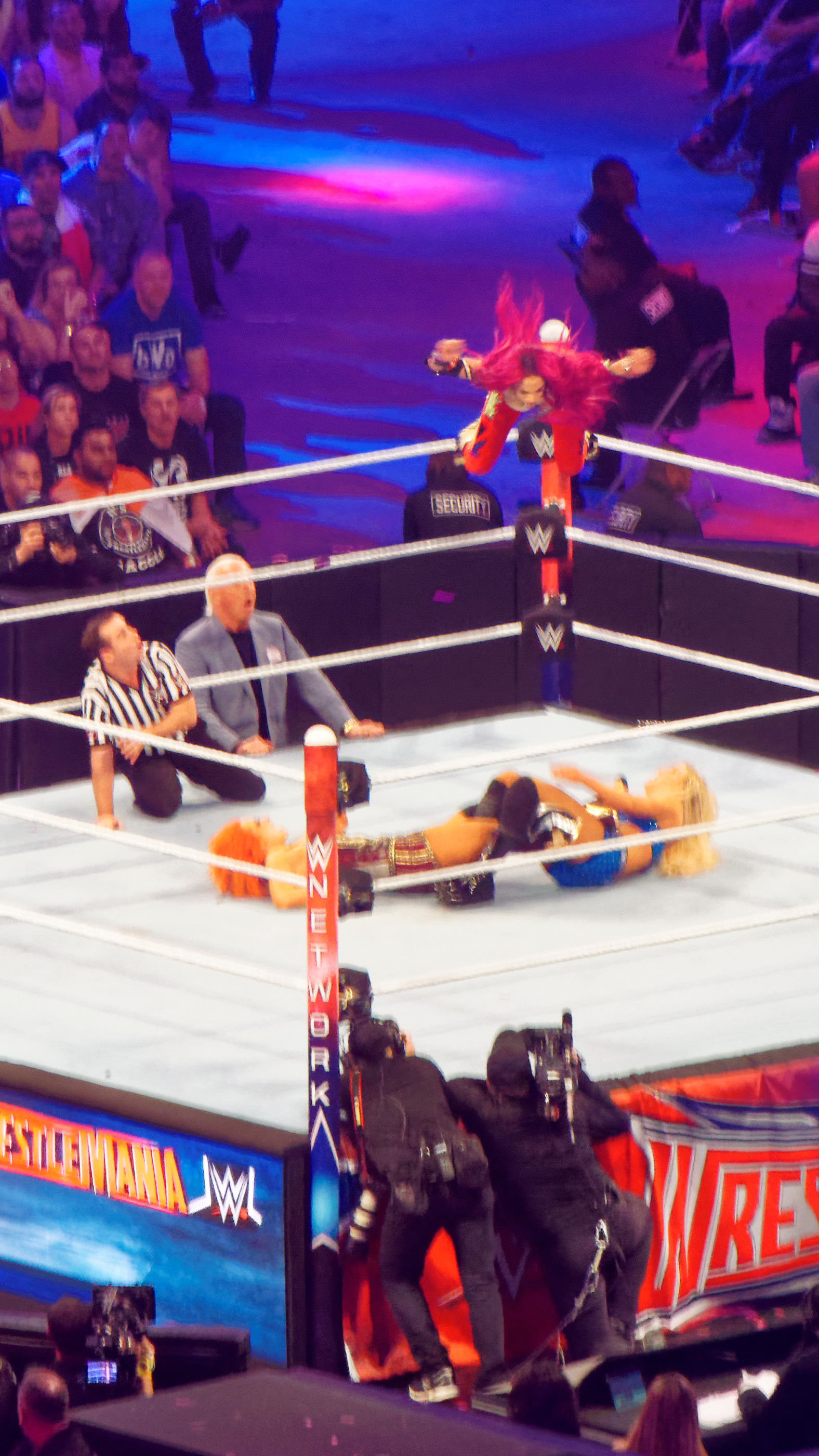
Becky Lynch (left), Charlotte (right), and Sasha Banks (diving from turnbuckle) in the triple threat match for the inaugural WWE Women's Championship

After the 2016 WWE Hall of Fame class had been presented, Charlotte, Becky Lynch, and Sasha Banks (who had her cousin and newly-minted WWE Hall of Famer Snoop Dogg perform her entrance theme while accompanying her to the ring) wrestled in a Triple Threat match. Originally promoted as being for Charlotte's WWE Divas Championship, the match would instead determine the inaugural holder of the WWE Women's Championship as the Divas title was retired. During the match, Charlotte applied the Figure-four leglock on Lynch. Banks broke it up with a Frog Splash and pinned Charlotte, who kicked out. Later, Banks performed a suicide dive on Charlotte. As Banks taunted Ric Flair (Charlotte's father and manager), Lynch took him out. Charlotte then performed a top-rope moonsault on Lynch and Banks. Back in the ring, Charlotte performed Natural Selection on Banks and Lynch at the same time, but both kicked out. Afterwards, Lynch, Banks, and Charlotte applied their respective submissions, only for the other to break it up. In the climax, Lynch performed an Exploder suplex from the top rope on Charlotte, who rolled out of the ring. Banks then applied the Bank Statement on Lynch, but Charlotte threw Banks out of the ring. Charlotte then applied the Figure-Eight Leglock on Lynch while Ric prevented Banks from intervening. Lynch submitted, giving the win and the WWE Women's title to Charlotte.

The Hell in a Cell match between The Undertaker and Shane McMahon was next. If Shane won, he would get control of Raw, while The Undertaker would be banned from wrestling at future WrestleManias. The Undertaker dominated the start of the match and executed a Last Ride powerbomb on McMahon for a near-fall. McMahon fought back and eventually gained the advantage by reversing Hell's Gate into a Sharpshooter. McMahon then placed a garbage can in front of The Undertaker's chest and performed a Coast-to-Coast for a near-fall. The Undertaker tackled McMahon through the side of the cell, and the two fought on the floor around ringside. After The Undertaker countered a Sleeper Hold by slamming McMahon through a broadcast table, McMahon struck The Undertaker with television monitors and a metal toolbox to keep him down and placed him across another broadcast table. McMahon then climbed to the top of the cell and attempted the Leap of Faith onto The Undertaker, who moved, causing McMahon to fall through the broadcast table. Though McMahon motioned for The Undertaker to "bring it", he had no strength left to fight. The Undertaker executed a Tombstone Piledriver to win the match. McMahon was taken out of the stadium on a stretcher (while showing a thumbs-up to the crowd) while The Undertaker walked off and smirked. This would be the final Hell in a Cell Match that Undertaker would compete in during his career.

Next was the André the Giant Memorial Battle Royal which saw several surprise entrants in the match, including legends Diamond Dallas Page and Tatanka, NXT call-up Baron Corbin making his main roster debut and former basketball player Shaquille O'Neal as a celebrity entry. Both O'Neal and Big Show performed a double chokeslam on Kane to start and the other wrestlers were then thrown aside (though not eliminated) by O'Neal and Big Show. After Fandango and Damien Sandow were eliminated by Big Show and O'Neal respectively, O'Neal and Big Show fought to the ropes, where the other participants eliminated them both. In the end, Corbin won the match by last eliminating Kane.

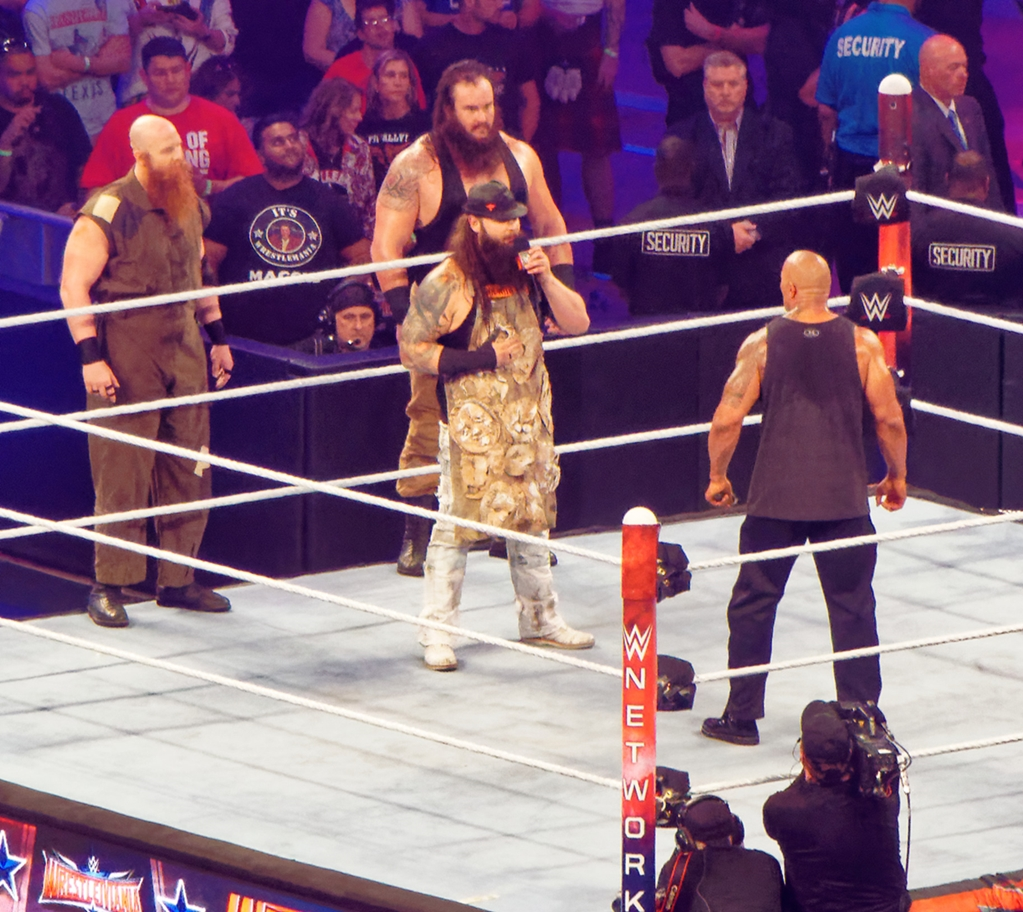
Wyatt Family member Erick Rowan (far left) was defeated by The Rock (right), setting a new record for the shortest match at WrestleMania.

The Rock then made a grand entrance, which included the Dallas Cowboys Cheerleaders and The Rock using a flamethrower to set a big sign bearing his name ablaze. The Rock announced that WrestleMania 32 had set the all-time attendance record with 101,763, when he was confronted by The Wyatt Family (Erick Rowan, Bray Wyatt, and Braun Strowman). After some verbal back-and-forth, The Rock (who had his ring gear on underneath his street clothes) challenged them to a match. Rowan accepted the challenge and was quickly defeated following a Rock Bottom. WWE recognized the match length as six seconds, though other sources reported seven seconds. This set a new WrestleMania record for the shortest match, besting the previous record (11 seconds) set by Kane and Chavo Guerrero's match at WrestleMania XXIV. Enraged by this quick victory, the entire Wyatt Family then surrounded The Rock when surprisingly, John Cena emerged and helped The Rock clear the ring of the Wyatts. The segment ended when The Rock and Cena walked up the ramp and The Rock hugged his family before raising Cena's arm. The Rock's match against Erick Rowan proved to be his last wrestling match until he returned in 2024, where he wrestled alongside Roman Reigns against Cody Rhodes and Seth Rollins.

=== Main event ===
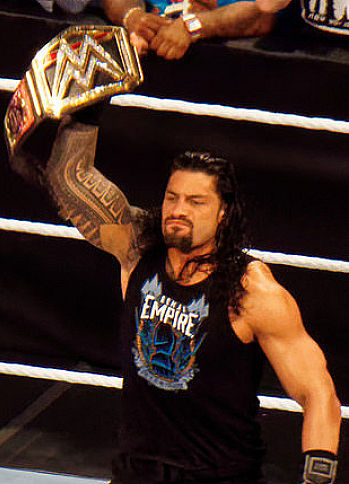
Roman Reigns defeated Triple H in the main event to become a three-time WWE World Heavyweight Champion.

In the main event, Triple H (accompanied by Stephanie McMahon) defended the WWE World Heavyweight Championship against Roman Reigns. During the match, Triple H was cheered despite being the heel whereas Reigns was heavily booed despite being the face. While Reigns was taking control of the match, Stephanie distracted the referee, allowing Triple H to execute a low blow and target Reigns's nose. Reigns performed a Spear through the barricade on Triple H. Triple H began to target Reigns's arm but Reigns recovered and executed another Spear, only for Stephanie to pull the referee out of the ring, voiding the pinfall. Stephanie argued with the referee and was inadvertently struck by a Spear from Reigns. Triple H executed a Pedigree on Reigns for a near-fall. Stephanie then handed Triple H his trademark sledgehammer but the referee warned him that he'd be disqualified if he used it (although he would retain the WWE World Heavyweight Championship). In the end, Reigns executed two Superman Punches on Triple H, dodged a sledgehammer shot and executed the third spear to regain the championship for a third time. A wide array of celebratory fireworks was released.

== Reception ==
As predicted by multiple critics before the event, Reigns (despite playing a heroic character) was booed by some of the WrestleMania crowd during the main event and as the show went off the air with him as champion, with the result drawing angry reactions. To placate the angry crowd, WWE had Triple H play to the crowd after broadcasting had concluded. The main event also saw the uninterested crowd chanting for various wrestlers uninvolved in the match or storyline: Sami Zayn, Bayley, and Shinsuke Nakamura. Several reports emerged of WWE muting the crowd microphones at WrestleMania during and after the main event when Reigns was being booed.

Reportedly, some attendees were unhappy about the entrance into AT&T Stadium, which they described as long and messy. On the post-WrestleMania Raw, also held in Dallas but a day later, Vince McMahon asked the live crowd what they thought of WrestleMania 32. The crowd responded by booing and then booed even louder when Vince mentioned Reigns as the new world champion.

=== Attendance and revenue ===
On the day of the event, WWE claimed an attendance of 101,763 in the AT&T Stadium, which surpassed the previous WWE-claimed record of 93,173 for WrestleMania III in 1987. Also, WWE reported the event grossing $17.3 million for WWE's highest-grossing live event, and surpassing the previous year's $12.6 million. However, journalist Dave Meltzer initially reported 93,730 as "the attendance as would be normally announced for an event" with a total 97,769 people in the stadium if one includes stadium personnel, WWE personnel, etc. Meltzer attributed the exaggeration due to WWE not wanting to let down their fans after WWE's promoting "from the start of drawing 100,000 people" to WrestleMania 32. The 93,730 figure would still be WWE's highest attended event, as according to Meltzer the previous record was the 1992 SummerSlam event at 79,127, while WrestleMania III did "more than 78,000". Meanwhile, Meltzer endorsed the grossing figure as "either accurate or very close". The actual fan attendance was later clarified as being 80,709, a figure supported by Fightful who were provided the turnstile count by the Arlington Police Department.

In a conference call in February 2017, WWE Chairman Vince McMahon said, "We were proud to set our attendance record of over 100,000, which includes, by the way, ushers and ticket takers and all of that. It wasn't 101,000 paid, but nonetheless, it was a record for us."

=== Reviews ===
WrestleMania 32 received generally mixed-to-negative reactions from critics, who criticized the event for its length and questionable booking decisions. Some critics and fans would even consider this one of the worst WrestleManias of all time. Critics who reviewed both WrestleMania 32 and WWE's NXT TakeOver: Dallas event which occurred two days earlier concluded that the NXT event was a greatly superior "professional wrestling show" despite WrestleMania having more "spectacle"; NXT's match of (the debuting) Shinsuke Nakamura versus Sami Zayn in particular was praised as better than any moment or match from WrestleMania 32.

Troy L. Smith of cleveland.com wrote that "WrestleMania 32 was a night that defied low expectations, thanks in large part a ton of WWE nostalgia", but added that "some of that early goodwill was squandered by odd booking decisions". Smith felt that the HHH-Reigns main event was "extremely boring – one of the worst main events ever at WrestleMania", with the ending saw "WWE found itself stuck in a moment it couldn't get out of with more boos than cheers". Ultimately, Smith concluded that "WrestleMania 32 proves Zack Ryder (or anyone) is better than Roman Reigns".

Paul Tamburro of CraveOnline wrote that the show was characterized by "inexplicable booking decisions that actively undermined all storyline progression", adding that "WWE routinely swerved its fans with finishes to matches that were less exciting than what had been expected". He decried the HHH-Reigns main event as a "dull, slow-paced match" and described Reigns's babyface push as "absurd" and "an embarrassing failed experiment for the company", with "the crowd still being given no reason to feel anything for the guy outside of sheer ambivalence or venomous hatred". Tamburro was also critical of the Shane McMahon–Undertaker match, which he described as "thoroughly pointless", and of the booking of Dean Ambrose, writing that "him losing to Lesnar in such a disappointing manner puts a big dent in his value". He had further criticism for the company's over-reliance on past stars, writing that "while the implementation of these big names was a lot of fun, it still happened to the detriment of talent currently on the roster". In contrast, Tamburro praised the Women's Championship match, calling it "triumphant", and described Zack Ryder's unexpected win as "the feel-good moment of the show".

James Caldwell of Pro Wrestling Torch described the event as a "weird show". He rated the HHH-Reigns match 1.5 stars out of 5, questioning why "anyone wanted to sit through this long of a main event and criticizing "the egos of the McMahon family" for booking the match. Caldwell went on to describe Reigns as "a pet project that would be laughed out of this spot in any other era". Caldwell chose not to rate the Hell in a Cell match, describing it as a "weird deal" with "Shane McMahon, a non-wrestler against Undertaker in one of Taker’s last WrestleMania matches". The women's title match was rated 3 stars, "strong" other than the finish, which puzzled Caldwell when apparently "Mania isn't a big enough event to pay off Flair's repeated interference with the face(s) conquering".

Nolan Howell of Canoe Sports described the show as "absurdly bizarre. Strange booking decisions and nothing seemed to be resolved at all, aside from the impromptu Shane vs. Undertaker story which could have been tied up any time". Howell wrote that while "the match quality was fine", the show was "spectacle without a lot of substance". He described the second half of the show as a "train wreck creatively", adding that "WWE just can't do anything right really". Howell noted that when Reigns won the main event, "the crowd mics [were] suspiciously not picking up too much noise for the second or third time during" that match. Lastly, Howell described the Women's Championship match as the match of the night.

Dave Scherer of Pro Wrestling Insider commented on responses that WrestleMania 32 was "great", countering that "unless you are putting the framework in place for the future, you will reach a point where most of your assets are gone and you will be in a barren place". This was referencing that "the finishes and character development (or lack thereof)" resulting in older stars (Rock, Austin, Foley, Michaels and Jericho) shining at the expense of newer talent (Styles, The New Day, The League of Nations, and The Wyatt Family). Scherer also criticized Vince McMahon for ignoring the "clear edict" from fans against Roman Reigns as world champion.

Scott Keith of Sporting News wrote that WrestleMania 32 "ended up being a five-hour slog (seven hours with the pregame show) and one of the worst WrestleManias when all was said and done". He wrote that "Roman Reigns showed once again that he's not the guy to be the top star despite Triple H's best efforts to get a 'classic' match out of him, and the Shane–Undertaker match ended up being a 30-minute snoozefest instead of the chaotic mess that everyone wanted". Keith praised the Women's Championship match and Zack Ryder for having his "WrestleMania moment".

Aaron Oster of Rolling Stone wrote that "fans witnessed a roller-coaster ride that brought the WWE Universe from the highest of highs to the lowest of lows. Before looking at the bad, it's worth pointing out that there was also a lot of good". However, Oster felt that while WrestleMania 31 tried to "cater to disgruntled fans", WrestleMania 32 "felt like a six-hour attempt to piss off that same demo", especially the event's ending, which caused fans to feel "betrayed" after "dream endings" at WrestleMania XXX and 31.

In the 2016 Wrestling Observer Newsletter awards, WrestleMania 32 was voted the Worst Major Wrestling Show of the year.

== Aftermath ==
Despite Shane McMahon failing to gain control of Raw with a loss to the Undertaker at WrestleMania 32, he was awarded control of the next four episodes of Raw anyway post-WrestleMania. The post-WrestleMania Raw on April 4 began with Vince McMahon dismissing the crowd as crazy, and bragging how no one had a hold on him since he received the lockbox. Shane McMahon interrupted for a handshake with Vince, then thanked fans. Jealous of Shane supposedly upstaging him with strong fan support, Vince allowed Shane to run Raw that night, as Vince (thinking that Shane would produce a "disaster") wanted to show the world how "ridiculous" it would be. Shane was then allowed to continue controlling Raw until the Payback pay-per-view "due to the overwhelming support of the WWE Universe on social media".

Also on the post-WrestleMania Raw, where commentators described the crowd as booing those they should cheer, and cheering those they should boo, new world champion Roman Reigns (repeatedly and heavily booed) declared he was now "the guy" and was ready for title contenders. Four men answered the challenge: Chris Jericho, AJ Styles, Kevin Owens, and Sami Zayn. The four brawled, ultimately leaving Jericho in the ring, where Reigns attacked him. Shane McMahon then arranged a fatal four-way match between the four to determine the next world title contender. After Owens attacked Zayn backstage with a powerbomb through a table, Zayn was unable to compete, so Shane replaced him with a returning Cesaro in the four-way match. Styles pinned Jericho to win and become number one contender. Two weeks later, a match between Zayn and Owens was scheduled for Payback.

Meanwhile, Zack Ryder's reign as the new Intercontinental Champion lasted just one day. On the post-WrestleMania Raw, Ryder was goaded into defending his title against the Miz. During the match, Ryder's father was slapped by Miz's wife, Maryse, in her return to WWE television. This distraction cost Ryder the match and the title. A championship rematch took place on the following SmackDown, where The Miz again retained.

A ceremony presenting Charlotte with the new WWE Women's Championship occurred on the post-WrestleMania Raw, with WWE Hall of Famer Lita and many of WWE's female wrestlers present in the ring. After Charlotte thanked her father, Ric Flair, and began bragging about her own success, most of the women left the ceremony, leaving Natalya to confront Charlotte and apply her signature Sharpshooter submission. Natalya and Charlotte faced each other for the WWE Women's Championship the following week, where Ric pulled the referee out of the ring while Charlotte submitted, causing a disqualification win for Natalya, but Charlotte retained. A rematch between the two was later scheduled for Payback, where the referee awarded the match to Charlotte despite Natalya never submitting. A submission match between the two was later scheduled for Extreme Rules with Ric banned from ringside, where Charlotte retained after interference from Dana Brooke. Afterwards, Charlotte turned on Ric as she felt like she no longer needed him, and aligned herself with Brooke.

Sasha Banks would earn another shot at Charlotte's WWE Women's Championship (renamed to Raw Women's Championship after SummerSlam) after making her submit in a tag team match at Battleground. The following night on Raw, Banks defeated Charlotte to win the title for the first time. They then traded the championship four times, and their rivalry would go all the way to Roadblock: End of the Line on December 18, where Charlotte defeated Banks 3–2 in overtime of a 30-minute Iron Woman match to regain the title and end their rivalry.

The post-WrestleMania episode of Raw included Raw debuts of Baron Corbin, Apollo Crews, Enzo Amore, and Colin Cassady. Corbin fought Dolph Ziggler to a double count-out, then laid Ziggler out post-match. Meanwhile, Crews defeated Tyler Breeze. Enzo Amore and Colin Cassady debuted by confronting The Dudley Boyz (Bubba Ray Dudley and D-Von Dudley), who had just defeated The Usos (Jey Uso and Jimmy Uso) in a WrestleMania rematch, albeit in a tables match. A match between Ziggler and Corbin was later scheduled for Payback.

The New Day defended the WWE Tag Team Championship against The League of Nations (Sheamus and King Barrett). The New Day retained the titles after Kingston gained the pinfall over Barrett. Incensed by the loss, the group turned on Barrett, labeling him the group's "weakest link", but were subsequently attacked by The Wyatt Family (Bray Wyatt, Erick Rowan, and Braun Strowman).

On the April 21 episode of SmackDown, Ryback defeated United States Champion Kalisto in a non-title match to earn a United States Championship rematch at Payback.

On the April 11 episode of Raw, Shane McMahon announced a tag team tournament to decide the number one contenders to The New Day's WWE Tag Team Championships. The Dudley Boyz (Bubba Ray Dudley and D-Von Dudley) advanced by defeating The Lucha Dragons (Sin Cara and Kalisto), while The Usos (Jey Uso and Jimmy Uso) defeated The Social Outcasts (Curtis Axel and Heath Slater) to advance. After the match, The Usos were attacked by the returning Luke Gallows and the debuting Karl Anderson, who are recognized as two members of the Bullet Club stable in Japan. On the April 18 episode, the finals of the tournament was scheduled for Payback.

After helping Total Divas win their match at WrestleMania, Brie Bella announced that she was taking an extended break from wrestling on April 6, 2016, so that she could focus on starting a family with her retired husband Daniel Bryan.

The Wrestling Observer Newsletter reported that post-WrestleMania, Roman Reigns became more "reactive" against hostile crowds when "a camera isn't there to capture it", this included "yelling back and swearing at the vocal ringsiders". This was contrasted with John Cena, who "would laugh and smile at people who booed him." Reigns was again booed at the next pay-per-view, Payback, where he again won in the main event. As soon as broadcasting for that event stopped, Reigns reportedly turned on the crowd, yelling angrily at them. Meanwhile, WWE continued to try to hide the hostile reaction to Reigns, editing a fan sign for a photo on WWE.com for Payback's main event to remove a quote that Reigns "bores".

WrestleMania 32 was the last WrestleMania to occur before the reintroduction of the brand split in July, which again split the roster between the Raw and SmackDown brands where wrestlers were exclusively assigned to perform. As such, another world championship was introduced, the WWE Universal Championship, with the WWE World Heavyweight Championship truncated back to WWE Championship, thus it was also the last WrestleMania to feature one world championship. Two other championships would also be introduced following the reintroduction of the brand split in July, including the SmackDown Women's Championship and SmackDown Tag Team Championship, which resulted in the WWE Women's Championship and WWE Tag Team Championship (which both became exclusive to Raw) being renamed as Raw Women's Championship and Raw Tag Team Championship, respectively.

== Results ==
No.	Results	Stipulations	Times
1^{P}	Kalisto (c) defeated Ryback by pinfall	Singles match for the WWE United States Championship	8:58
2^{P}	Team Total Divas (Alicia Fox, Brie Bella, Eva Marie, Natalya, and Paige) defeated Team B.A.D. and Blonde (Emma, Lana, Naomi, Summer Rae, and Tamina) by submission	10-woman tag team match	11:25
3^{P}	The Usos (Jey Uso and Jimmy Uso) defeated The Dudley Boyz (Bubba Ray Dudley and D-Von Dudley) by pinfall	Tag team match	5:18
4	Zack Ryder defeated Kevin Owens (c), Dolph Ziggler, The Miz, Sami Zayn, Sin Cara, and Stardust	Ladder match for the WWE Intercontinental Championship	15:23
5	Chris Jericho defeated AJ Styles by pinfall	Singles match	17:10
6	The League of Nations (Alberto Del Rio, Rusev, and Sheamus) (with King Barrett) defeated The New Day (Big E, Kofi Kingston, and Xavier Woods) by pinfall	Six-man tag team match	10:03
7	Brock Lesnar (with Paul Heyman) defeated Dean Ambrose by pinfall	No Holds Barred Street Fight	13:06
8	Charlotte (with Ric Flair) defeated Becky Lynch and Sasha Banks by submission	Triple threat match for the inaugural WWE Women's Championship (Note: The triple threat match was originally scheduled for Charlotte to defend the WWE Divas Championship, but during the pre-show, the Divas title was retired and replaced by the WWE Women's Championship with the match instead determining its inaugural holder. In its last televised appearance, Charlotte made her entrance wearing the Divas Championship belt.)	16:03
9	The Undertaker defeated Shane McMahon by pinfall	Hell in a Cell match Since Shane lost, Vince McMahon gained control of a secret lockbox that was in Shane's possession. Had Shane won, he would have gained control of Raw and Undertaker would no longer compete at WrestleMania.	30:05
10	Baron Corbin won by last eliminating Kane (Note: Order of elimination from first eliminated: Fandango, Damien Sandow, Shaquille O'Neal, Big Show, Viktor, Diamond Dallas Page, Konnor, Tatanka, Jack Swagger, R-Truth, Goldust, Curtis Axel, Adam Rose, Heath Slater, Tyler Breeze, Mark Henry, Bo Dallas, Darren Young, and Kane)	20-man battle royal for the André the Giant Memorial Trophy	9:41
11	The Rock defeated Erick Rowan (with Braun Strowman and Bray Wyatt) by pinfall	Singles match	0:06
12	Roman Reigns defeated Triple H (c) (with Stephanie McMahon) by pinfall	Singles match for the WWE World Heavyweight Championship	27:11
(c) / – the champion(s) heading into the match; P / – the match was broadcast on the pre-show
