= Baron Corbin =

American professional wrestler (born 1984)

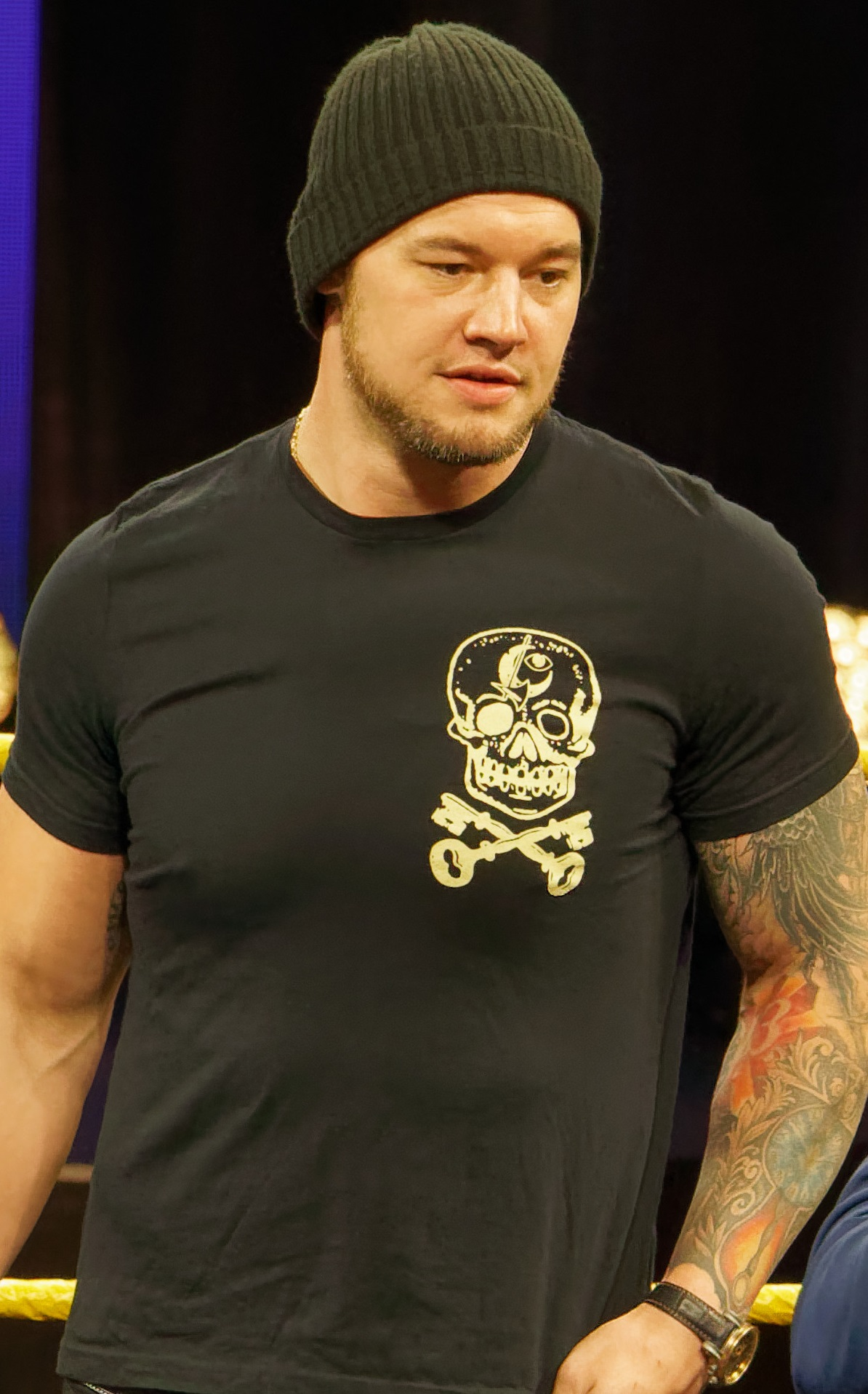
- Corbin in 2018
- Born: Thomas Pestock; September 13, 1984 (age 42); Lenexa, Kansas, U.S.
- Spouse: Rochelle Roman (m. 2017)
- Children: 2
- Professional wrestling career
- Ring name(s): Baron Corbin; Bishop Dyer; Happy Corbin; King Corbin; Tom Pestock
- Billed height: 6 ft 8 in (203 cm)
- Billed weight: 285 lb (129 kg)
- Billed from: Kansas City
- Trained by: Billy Gunn; Johnny Stamboli; Norman Smiley; WWE Performance Center
- Debut: October 18, 2012
- Football career

No. 68, 69
- Position: Offensive guard

Personal information
- Listed height: 6 ft 6 in (1.98 m)
- Listed weight: 317 lb (144 kg)

Career information
- College: Northwest Missouri State
- NFL draft: 2009: undrafted

Career history
- Indianapolis Colts (2009)*; Arizona Cardinals (2010–2011)*
- * Offseason or practice squad member only

Awards and highlights
- First-team All-MIAA (2008)
- Stats at Pro Football Reference

Thomas Pestock (born September 13, 1984) is an American professional wrestler and former professional football player. He has been signed to WWE since July 2026, where he performs on the SmackDown brand under the ring name Baron Corbin.

Pestock was an offensive lineman for the Indianapolis Colts and Arizona Cardinals of the NFL, as well as a two-time Golden Gloves boxing regional champion. He signed with WWE in August 2012 and was assigned to their developmental brand NXT under the ring name Baron Corbin, portraying a villainous character nicknamed the "Lone Wolf". He debuted on the main roster in April 2016 at WrestleMania 32, winning the André the Giant Memorial Battle Royal. In 2017, he won the Money in the Bank Briefcase and the WWE United States Championship In June 2018, he became the Constable of Raw and started a feud with Kurt Angle which culminated at WrestleMania 35, with Corbin emerging victorious in Angle's retirement match. A few months later, he won the 2019 King of the Ring tournament, thus changing his name to King Corbin until June 2021, when he lost his crown and adopted the character of a destitute man who had lost everything. From August 2021 to August 2022, he adopted the name Happy Corbin and began portraying a cheerful character who had become extremely wealthy from gambling, also forming an alliance with Madcap Moss. In October 2022, he began using the Baron Corbin name again and was managed by JBL until February 2023, when he returned to NXT and formed a tag team with Bron Breakker; they won the NXT Tag Team Championship and the 2024 Dusty Rhodes Tag Team Classic together. Corbin returned to the main roster in April 2024, then left WWE when his contract expired in November. He went on to perform on the independent circuit and Major League Wrestling (MLW) as Bishop Dyer, where he became the MLW World Tag Team Champions with Donovan Dijak. He returned to WWE in July 2026.

== Early life ==
Thomas Pestock was born on September 13, 1984 in Lenexa, Kansas. He has trained extensively in boxing and by 2007, he was a two-time Golden Gloves regional amateur boxing champion. He participated in the 2008 Golden Gloves National Tournament of Champions in the super heavyweight division, defeating Chaen Chess in the preliminaries and losing to Andrae Cathron in the quarter-finals.

== Football career ==
=== College ===
Pestock attended NCAA Division II college Northwest Missouri State University, where he played offensive guard, and he became a starter his junior year in 2007. Pestock was named honorable mention all-MIAA in 2007 and first-team all-MIAA in 2008. He was part of teams that went to four consecutive Division II National Championships and lost each time.

=== Professional ===
Pestock signed with the Indianapolis Colts on April 27, 2009, after going undrafted in the 2009 NFL draft. While with the Colts, he was roommates with future All-Pro punter and professional wrestler Pat McAfee, a fact that would be central to a feud between the two of them in WWE 13 years later. He was released by the Colts on August 13 and re-signed by the team on August 19. He was again released by the Colts on September 5.

Pestock joined the Arizona Cardinals' practice squad on December 24, 2009. He was re-signed to a futures contract on January 18, 2010, and was noted for throwing uppercuts in a team scuffle in training camp. He was released by the Cardinals on September 3 and signed to the team's practice squad on September 6. On January 4, 2011, he was again signed to a futures contract with the Cardinals. He was again released on September 2, 2011.

== Professional wrestling career ==
=== WWE (2012–2024) ===
==== NXT (2012–2016) ====
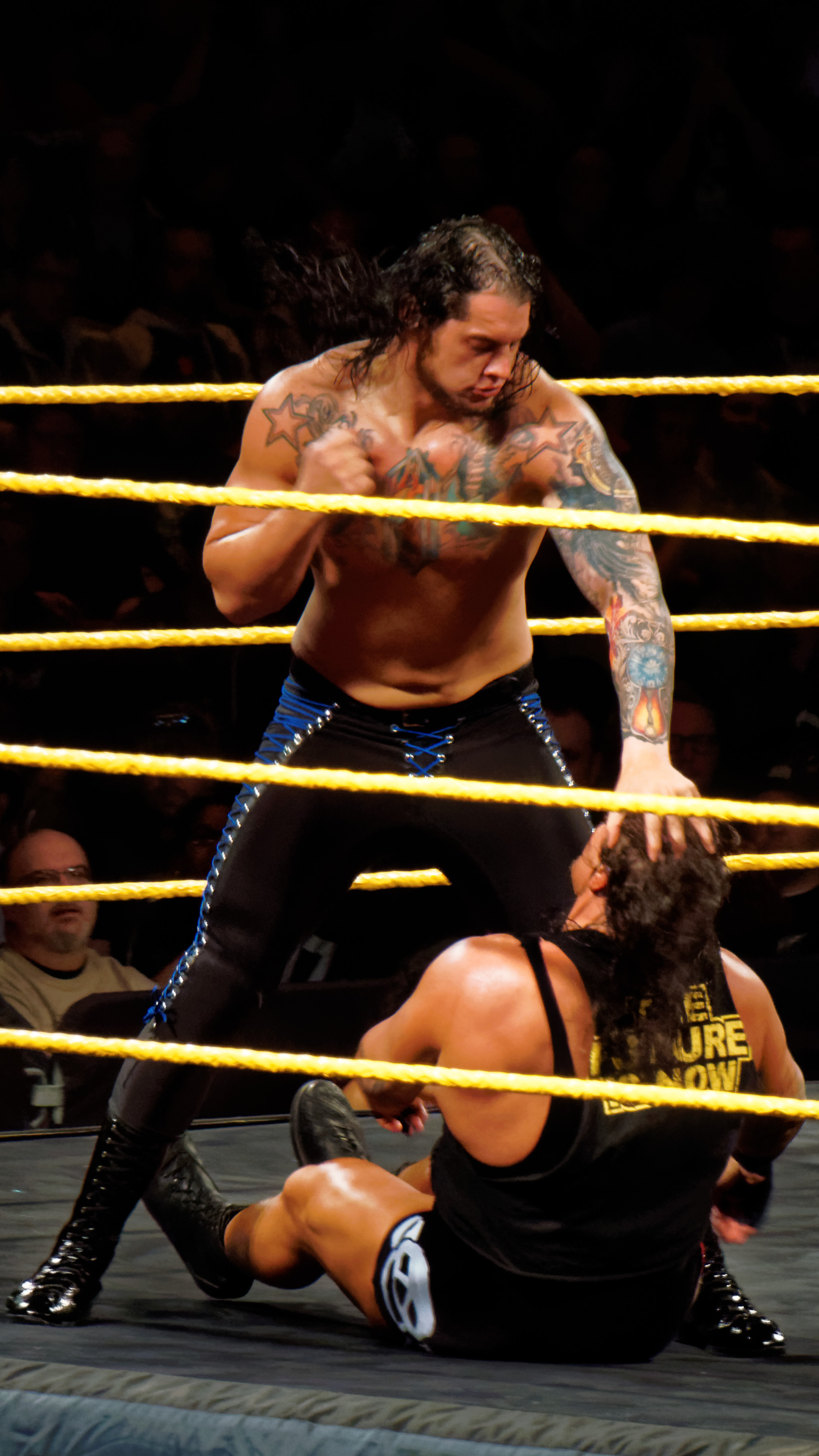
Corbin facing Rhyno in March 2015

Pestock signed with WWE's developmental system NXT in August 2012. Using the ring name Baron Corbin, he made his in-ring debut on October 18 at a house show, losing to Dante Dash. He would work in several NXT events, usually as an enhancement talent.

On September 11, 2014, at NXT TakeOver: Fatal 4-Way, Corbin re-debuted as a face with a new look and ring character to defeat CJ Parker. Corbin then won numerous singles matches against enhancement talents, each in a short amount of time, until crossing paths with Bull Dempsey, who was also winning his matches quickly, beginning a feud between the two. After a staredown at NXT TakeOver: R Evolution on December 11, Corbin won their highly anticipated one-on-one match on the January 14, 2015, episode of NXT, breaking Dempsey's undefeated streak in the process. Corbin again defeated Dempsey in the first round of a number #1 contender's tournament for the NXT Championship, and was eliminated by Adrian Neville in the semi-finals, ending Corbin's streak. At NXT TakeOver: Rival on February 11, Corbin defeated Dempsey in a No Disqualification match to end their feud.

In the following weeks, the crowd turned on him and on the May 14 episode of NXT, Corbin turned heel by showing a cocky and banterous persona. He started a feud with Rhyno, whom he defeated at NXT TakeOver: Unstoppable on May 20. Corbin lost to Samoa Joe at NXT TakeOver: Brooklyn on August 22. In September, Corbin formed a tag team with former rival Rhyno to take place in the Dusty Rhodes Tag Team Classic tournament, defeating The Ascension in the first round, and Johnny Gargano and Tommaso Ciampa in the second round. At NXT TakeOver: Respect on October 7, Corbin and Rhyno defeated Chad Gable and Jason Jordan to advance to the finals of the tournament, where they lost to Finn Bálor and Samoa Joe. After the event, a battle royal was held to determine the number #1 contender for the NXT Championship, which saw Corbin being lastly eliminated by Apollo Crews, who Corbin attacked during his title match to cost him the title, thus igniting a feud between the two that culminated in a match at NXT TakeOver: London on December 16, where Corbin defeated Crews.

In January 2016, Corbin was involved in a triple threat match between Sami Zayn and Samoa Joe on the January 27 episode of NXT to determine the number #1 contender for Finn Bálor's NXT Championship, but Corbin lost after Zayn and Joe both applied their submission holds on Corbin at the same time, with Corbin submitting. NXT General Manager William Regal did not give Corbin another title opportunity, leading to Corbin stating Regal would "regret" his decision, which culminated on the March 2 episode of NXT when Corbin attacked Austin Aries from behind after Regal introduced him, beginning a feud between the two that culminated in a match at NXT TakeOver: Dallas on April 1, where Corbin lost to Aries. On the April 13 episode of NXT, Corbin defeated Tucker Knight in his final NXT appearance.

==== Main roster beginnings (2016–2017) ====
Corbin made his main roster debut at WrestleMania 32, winning the André the Giant Memorial Battle Royal by last eliminating Kane. The following night on Raw, he attacked Dolph Ziggler after their match, beginning a feud between the two. Corbin was defeated by Ziggler at the Payback pre-show on May 1 and was eliminated by him from a battle royal on Raw. Corbin defeated Ziggler on the May 9 episode of Raw and in a no disqualification match at the Extreme Rules pre-show on May 22. Ziggler then challenged Corbin to a technical wrestling match, which ended in a disqualification after Ziggler hit Corbin with a low blow. At Money in the Bank on June 19, Corbin defeated Ziggler to end their feud.

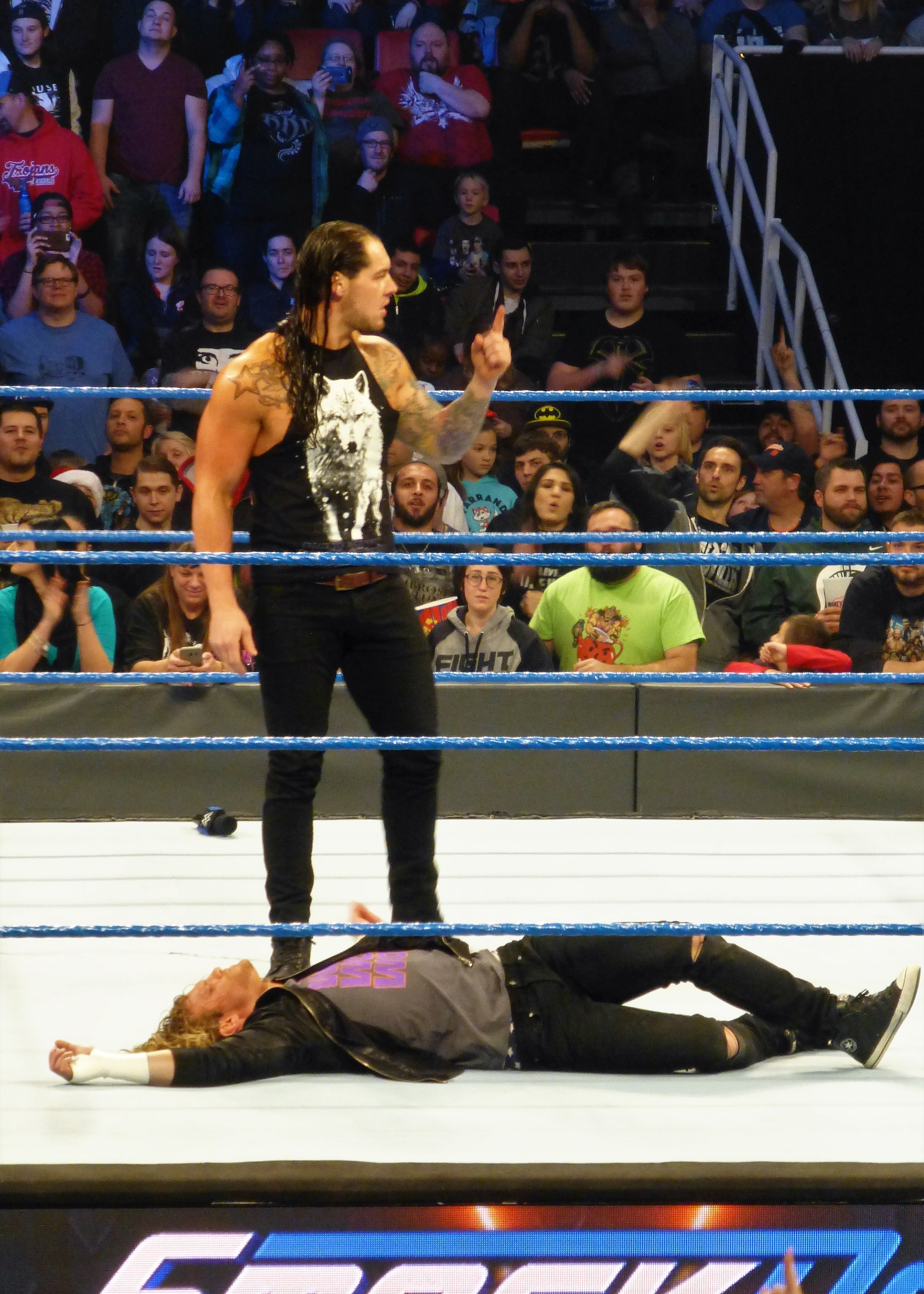
Corbin after attacking Dolph Ziggler in December 2016

At the 2016 WWE draft on July 19, Corbin was drafted to the SmackDown brand. After Apollo Crews earned a match for the Intercontinental Championship by defeating Corbin and Kalisto in a triple threat match, Corbin repeatedly assaulted Kalisto (who had been pinned in the match), eventually putting him out of action with a (kayfabe) injury. He defeated Crews at the Backlash pre-show on September 11. At No Mercy on October 9, he defeated Jack Swagger as well on the October 18 episode of SmackDown. On the November 8 episode of SmackDown, the returning Kalisto attacked Corbin, causing a (kayfabe) injury and forcing Corbin to drop out of SmackDown's Survivor Series team. After retaliating by costing Kalisto the Cruiserweight Championship at Survivor Series, Kalisto attacked Corbin with a chair during a match on the November 22 episode of SmackDown, leading to a chairs match between the two at TLC: Tables, Ladders & Chairs on December 4, which Corbin won.

On the December 20 episode of SmackDown, Corbin confronted Dolph Ziggler, who had just earned a title match against WWE Champion AJ Styles. A match between the two, with Ziggler's title opportunity on the line, ended in a double countout; as a result, Corbin was added to the title match, giving Corbin his first world title opportunity in WWE. On December 27, Styles won the match by pinning Ziggler. At the Royal Rumble on January 29, Corbin entered the Royal Rumble match at #13, eliminating Braun Strowman and lasting over 32 minutes before being eliminated by The Undertaker. At Elimination Chamber on February 12, Corbin competed in the namesake match for the WWE Championship. Immediately after being eliminated by Intercontinental Champion Dean Ambrose, Corbin attacked Ambrose, causing the latter's elimination. Corbin attacked Ambrose on the March 7 episode of SmackDown with metal pipe and a forklift. On March 21, Ambrose retaliated by distracting Corbin in a match against Randy Orton. Corbin unsuccessfully challenged Ambrose for the Intercontinental Championship at the WrestleMania 33 pre-show on April 2 but defeated Ambrose in a non-title Street Fight on SmackDown. On the April 17 episode of SmackDown, Corbin failed to win a title opportunity for the United States Championship in a triple threat match against AJ Styles and Sami Zayn. After the show, Corbin attacked Zayn and also shoved an official, for which he was suspended and fined by SmackDown Commissioner Shane McMahon. At Backlash on May 21, Corbin lost to Zayn.

==== Mr. Money in the Bank and United States Champion (2017–2018) ====
At Money in the Bank on June 18, Corbin won the namesake match, earning him a world title match at the time of his choosing. Corbin lost to Shinsuke Nakamura by disqualification at Battleground on July 23 and again on the following episode of SmackDown. On the August 1 episode of SmackDown, Corbin attacked Nakamura, who had just become number #1 contender for the WWE Championship, but was attacked by Cena. On the August 15 episode of SmackDown, Corbin interrupted a match between John Cena and WWE Champion Jinder Mahal and cashed in his Money in the Bank contract, but was pinned by Mahal after being sidetracked by Cena, becoming the third wrestler to fail to win the title in a cash-in. At SummerSlam on August 20, Corbin lost to Cena.

On the August 22 episode of SmackDown, Corbin was approached by Kevin Owens to officiate his title match against United States Champion AJ Styles, with the promise of a future championship match if Owens were to win the title; Corbin abandoned the match towards the end after heavy criticism from Shane McMahon, leaving the officiating duty to Shane instead. The following week, both Corbin and Tye Dillinger wanted to answer an open challenge issued by Styles; Dillinger was quicker but was then attacked by Corbin. Corbin defeated Dillinger the following week and on September 19, challenged Styles to a match at Hell in a Cell. When Corbin lost to Dillinger the following week on SmackDown, Dillinger was added to the match. In the subsequent triple threat match at Hell in a Cell on October 8, Corbin pinned Dillinger to win the title. Corbin retained the title against Styles on SmackDown and defeated Intercontinental Champion The Miz in an Interbrand Champion vs Champion match at Survivor Series on November 19. At Clash of Champions on December 17, Corbin lost his title to Dolph Ziggler in a triple threat match also involving Bobby Roode, ending his first reign at 70 days.

At Royal Rumble on January 28, 2018, Corbin entered at #4 but was eliminated by Finn Bálor. On the February 13 episode of SmackDown, Corbin defeated Kevin Owens to earn a spot in the six-pack challenge for the WWE Championship. At Fastlane on March 11, Styles won the six-pack challenge by pinning Owens. Corbin competed in the Andre the Giant Memorial Battle Royal on the WrestleMania 34 pre-show on April 8; he made it to the final two before being eliminated by Matt Hardy.

==== Constable of Raw (2018–2019) ====
Corbin performing the Deep Six on Seth Rollins

On April 16, Corbin moved to the Raw brand as part of the Superstar Shake-up. On the June 4 episode of Raw, he became commissioner Stephanie McMahon's representative as the Constable of Raw, a storyline position without real power in the promotion. Corbin debuted a new look the following week, wearing a suit and sporting a shaved head (in reality, he had been suffering from hair loss and decided to shave it off and donate his ponytail to charity). Corbin then started a feud with Finn Bálor, to whom he lost at Extreme Rules on July 15 and at SummerSlam on August 19. On the following episode of Raw, he was pointed as acting general manager, replacing Kurt Angle. On the September 17 episode of Raw, Corbin booked himself against Roman Reigns for the Universal Championship, but did not win the title.

On November 2 at Crown Jewel, Corbin cost Braun Strowman the Universal Championship in a match against Brock Lesnar, starting a feud between the two. At TLC: Tables, Ladders & Chairs on December 16, Corbin faced Strowman in a TLC match where, if Corbin won, he would become a full-time general manager of Raw; but if Corbin lost, he would be stripped of his authoritative powers. Strowman enlisted the help of Apollo Crews, Bobby Roode, Chad Gable, Finn Bálor, and former Raw general manager Kurt Angle to defeat Corbin. The next night on Raw, authority figures Vince McMahon, Shane McMahon, Stephanie McMahon, and Triple H stated that they would now be running both Raw and SmackDown as a unit with no general managers. Corbin confronted the McMahons to have another chance to become the Raw General Manager. Triple H said that if he could defeat Kurt Angle, he could become the Raw General Manager. However, Triple H added Apollo Crews, Bobby Roode, and Chad Gable to make it a 4-on-1 handicap match that Corbin lost, definitively ruling him out of the position. Corbin continued his feud with Braun Strowman, being eliminated by him in the Royal Rumble match at the Royal Rumble on January 27, 2019. At Elimination Chamber on February 17, Corbin defeated Strowman in a no disqualification match, following interference from Bobby Lashley and Drew McIntyre. The next night on Raw, Corbin was defeated by Strowman in a tables match, ending their feud.

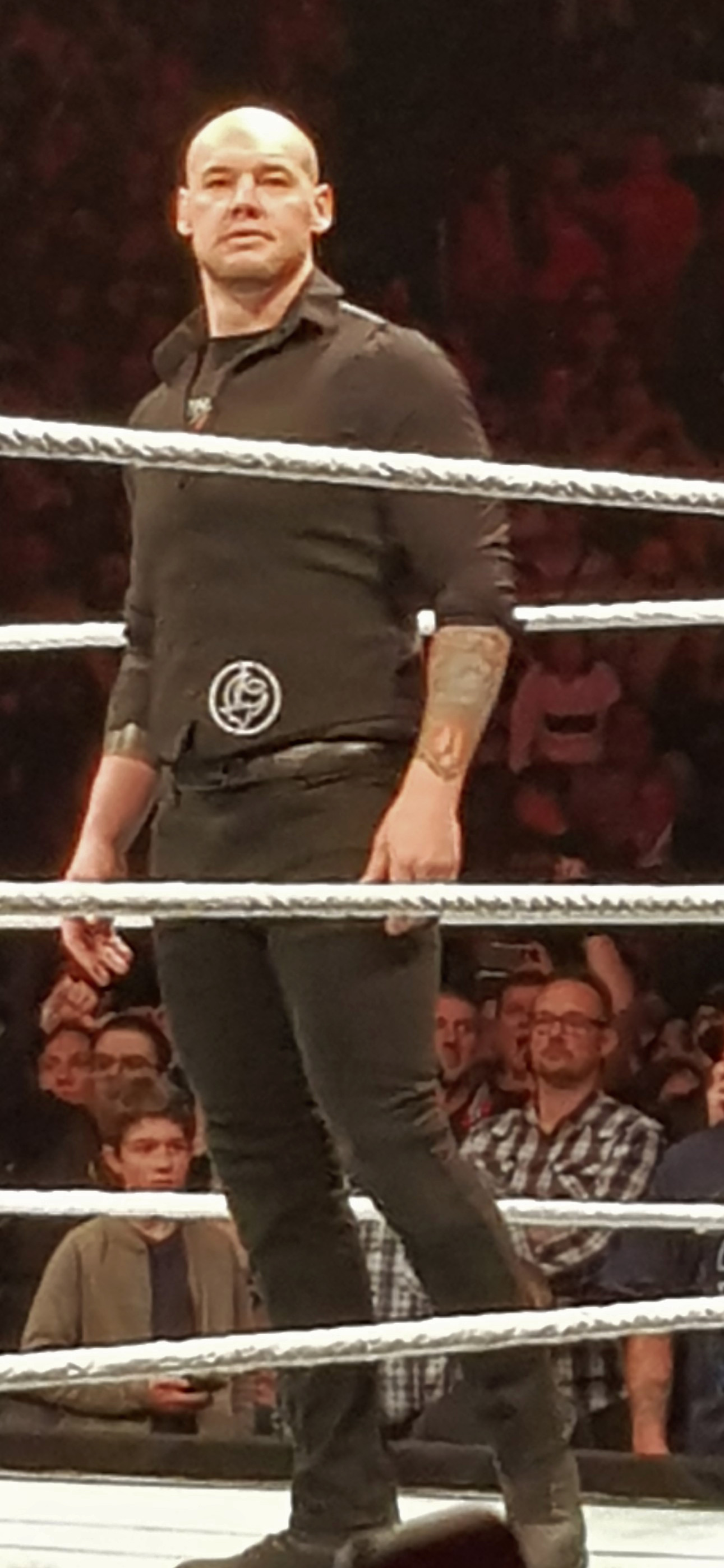
Corbin in May 2019

Corbin started a feud with Kurt Angle on the March 18 episode of Raw. Angle selected Corbin as his opponent for WrestleMania 35 in his farewell match, as Corbin had caused Angle many problems during Angle's tenure as Raw general manager. At WrestleMania on April 7, Corbin defeated Angle. On the May 27 episode of Raw, Corbin defeated Braun Strowman, Bobby Lashley, and The Miz in a fatal four-way elimination match to earn a Universal Championship match against the champion Seth Rollins. At Super ShowDown on June 7, Corbin lost to Rollins, but during the match, Corbin got into an argument with referee John Cone, allowing Rollins to roll-up Corbin to retain the title. This led to a rematch at Stomping Grounds, where Corbin chose Lacey Evans, who was in an ongoing feud with Rollins' real life girlfriend Becky Lynch, as the special guest referee for the match; Evans was biased towards Corbin throughout the match, adding multiple stipulations in his favour. However, Lynch, who defeated Evans for the Raw Women's Championship earlier in the night, attacked Evans and took her out of the match, leading to Rollins' victory over Corbin at the event on June 23. The following night on Raw, Corbin and Evans challenged Rollins and Lynch to a match at Extreme Rules. The match was agreed to with two stipulations: Rollins and Lynch would defend their respective championships, while the match would be the final respective championship opportunities for Corbin and Evans. At Extreme Rules on July 14, Corbin and Evans lost the match.

==== King Corbin (2019–2021) ====
In September 2019, Corbin won the 2019 King of the Ring tournament when he defeated Chad Gable in the finals, subsequently changing his ring name to King Corbin. At Hell in a Cell on October 6, Corbin lost to Gable.

As part of the 2019 draft, Corbin was drafted to the SmackDown brand. In November, Corbin began a feud with Roman Reigns. At Survivor Series on November 24, Reigns caused Corbin's elimination when Reigns performed the Spear on Corbin. Corbin defeated Reigns in a TLC match at TLC: Tables, Ladders & Chairs on December 15, but was defeated at Royal Rumble on January 26, 2020 in a falls count anywhere match. They ended their feud in a steel cage match at Super ShowDown on February 27, where Corbin was defeated.

On the first night of WrestleMania 36 on April 4, Corbin lost to Elias. On the April 24 episode of SmackDown, Corbin defeated Drew Gulak with the help of Cesaro and Shinsuke Nakamura to qualify for the Money in the Bank ladder match. At Money in the Bank on May 10, Corbin failed to win the contract after he and AJ Styles tussled over the briefcase and dropped it to Otis unintentionally. On the July 17 episode of SmackDown, he attacked Matt Riddle, leading to a match at Payback on August 30, where Corbin lost to Riddle. He defeated Riddle on the September 25 episode of SmackDown, ending their feud. From December 2020 to February 2021, Corbin began a feud with Rey Mysterio, Dominik Mysterio, and Murphy, which saw him form a short-lived partnership with Wesley Blake and Steve Cutler, but disbanded following Cutler and Blake's WWE release.

On the June 18 episode of SmackDown, Corbin lost to Shinsuke Nakamura in a Battle for the Crown match, thus losing his crown to Nakamura and ending his King gimmick. The following week on SmackDown, his ring name was reverted to Baron Corbin.

==== Happy Corbin and alliance with JBL (2021–2023) ====
In July, Corbin was repackaged as Sad Corbin, sporting dirty clothes and an unkempt beard, giving him a disheveled look. The character was changed the next month under a rich persona, being called Happy Corbin and being paired with Madcap Moss. They entered into a feud with Drew McIntyre, with Corbin accompanying Moss to his matches with McIntyre at Day 1 on January 1, 2022 and Elimination Chamber on February 19, both of which he lost. Corbin and Moss also were eliminated by McIntyre in the Royal Rumble match. Their feud culminated on the first night of WrestleMania 38 on April 2, where Corbin was defeated by McIntyre.

On the April 8 episode of SmackDown, Corbin blamed his loss on Moss before attacking him, ending their alliance and beginning a feud between the two. This led to a match at WrestleMania Backlash on May 8, which Moss won. At Hell in a Cell on June 5, the two competed in a No Holds Barred match, which Corbin lost. On the June 17 episode of SmackDown, Corbin lost to Moss in a Last Laugh match, ending their feud; after the match, Corbin confronted commentator Pat McAfee, who had been making fun of Corbin during his feud with Moss. After Money in the Bank went off the air the following day, Corbin attacked McAfee at ringside and accepted his challenge for a match at SummerSlam. At the event on July 30, Corbin lost to McAfee after he hit a low-blow while the referee was down.

On the October 17 episode of Raw, Corbin returned under the Baron Corbin name with his new manager JBL, defeating Dolph Ziggler. Debuting the new nickname of "The Modern Day Wrestling God" as a reference to JBL's former nickname, he would go on a winning streak until losing to Drew McIntyre on the November 21 episode of Raw. Corbin then embarked upon a losing streak until a live event on April 29, where he defeated Rick Boogs.

==== Return to NXT and main roster (2023–2024) ====
After the 2023 WWE Draft in May, Corbin began to appear on NXT. He was assigned to NXT, where he had two matches for the NXT Championship, one against Carmelo Hayes at NXT Gold Rush on June 27 and the other against Ilja Dragunov at Deadline, losing both times. Corbin also wrestled the debuting Gable Steveson at NXT The Great American Bash, ending in a double countout.

At NXT No Mercy on September 30, Corbin defeated Bron Breakker. He later was paired with Breakker, winning the Dusty Rhodes Tag Team Classic tournament, defeating Trick Williams and Carmelo Hayes in the final at Vengeance Day to earn a shot at the NXT Tag Team Championships. On the February 13, 2024 episode of NXT, Corbin and Breakker defeated The D'Angelo Family (Tony D'Angelo and Channing "Stacks" Lorenzo) to win the NXT Tag Team Championship. On April 6 at Stand & Deliver, Corbin and Breakker defeated Fraxiom (Axiom and Nathan Frazer) to retain the titles. In a rematch on the following episode of NXT, Corbin and Breakker lost the titles to Fraxiom, ending their reign at 57 days.

As part of the 2024 WWE Draft on April 26, Corbin was drafted back to the SmackDown brand, and worked as a face on the brand. He then won a WWE Speed tournament for a WWE Speed Championship match against Andrade on 24 July, which he lost. Corbin then formed a tag team with Apollo Crews until November 1, when his WWE contract expired and was not renewed, ending his 12-year tenure with the promotion.

=== Independent circuit (2025–2026) ===
Pestock worked for several promotions after he was released by WWE. His first match was a defeat against Josh Barnett at Game Changer Wrestling's The People vs GCW in a Bloodsport match. Pestock later adopted the new ring name “Bishop Dyer” with the moniker of the "Nomad". He appeared on March 14 Maple Leaf Pro Wrestling's Mayhem, unsuccessfully challenging Thom Latimer for the NWA World's Heavyweight Championship, and wrestled a dark match for All Elite Wrestling on January 21, 2026.

=== Major League Wrestling (2025–2026) ===
Between 2025 and 2026, he also worked for Major League Wrestling (MLW), where he joined Donovan Dijak and Saint Laurent. On June 26 at Summer of the Beasts, Dyer and Dijak, as "The Skyscrapers", defeated Los Depredadores (Magnus and Rugido) to win the MLW World Tag Team Championships, holding the titles for 317 days before losing them to The Good Brothers (Doc Gallows and Karl Anderson). Dyer's remaining MLW appearanes would air on tape delay with his final match airing on August 29, 2026, where he lost to Matt Riddle.

=== Return to WWE (2026–present) ===
Pestock made his return to WWE on the July 10, 2026 episode of SmackDown under the Baron Corbin name, interfering in the United States Championship match between champion Trick Williams and challenger Carmelo Hayes by attacking both men. On Night 2 of SummerSlam on August 2, Corbin defeated Williams to win the United States Championship for the second time. After failing to defeat Lil Yachty in five minutes at Sunday Night's Main Event on September 6, Corbin would lose the title back to Williams in an immediate match, ending his second reign at 35 days. On the September 25 episode of SmackDown, Corbin failed to regain the title from Williams in a steel cage match, ending their feud.

== Jiu-jitsu career ==
Pestock practices Brazilian jiu-jitsu, earning a purple belt from Rolles Gracie Jr., and competes under his real name. He won a gold medal at the December 2023 Jiu Jitsu World League III Gi finals, and a silver medal at the February 2024 Jiu Jitsu Florida Vi Gi finals. In November 2024, just weeks after not having his contract renewed by WWE, Pestock won a gold medal in the IBJJF Tampa International Open 2024. Pestock then won the Master 3 ultra-heavyweight and absolute divisions at purple belt at the IBJJF Pan Championship 2025. In December 2025 Pestock completed in the IBJJF Tampa International Open for a second year in a row and won double gold with all his victories coming via submission.

== Professional wrestling style and persona ==
Pestock, as Baron Corbin, is best known for his outlaw biker gimmick known as the "Lone Wolf", to which he credits Bill DeMott, Corey Graves, Billy Gunn, Kane, and Dusty Rhodes with helping develop it. After leaving WWE, he adopted the ring name Bishop Dyer with the moniker the "Nomad", which is a tribute gimmick to the "Lone Wolf".

He uses a lifting reverse STO called End of Days as a finisher. The idea for him to use the move came about when he was practicing a spot with Sami Callihan, then known as Solomon Crowe in NXT. The move was highly protected in WWE; no wrestler successfully kicked out of the move from its introduction until Drew McIntyre achieved it at WrestleMania 38. He also uses a spinning side slam called Deep Six and a chokeslam backbreaker called Blood Moon.

== Other media ==
=== Video games ===
Year	Title	Notes	Ref.
2015	WWE 2K16	Video game debut	
2016	WWE 2K17		
2017	WWE 2K18		
2018	WWE 2K19		
2019	WWE 2K20		
2020	WWE 2K Battlegrounds		
2022	WWE 2K22		
2023	WWE 2K23		
2024	WWE 2K24		
2025	WWE 2K25		

== Personal life ==
Pestock married Rochelle Roman on April 29, 2017. They reside in Tampa, Florida, and have two daughters. In his personal life he is a home chef, and frequently makes cooking videos on platforms like TikTok.

As a tribute to his father, who died in 2008 from Creutzfeldt–Jakob disease, Pestock wears his father's wedding ring on a necklace. He is known for his numerous tattoos, some of which include portraits of his father and grandfather on his leg, full sleeve tattoos on his left arm that include clocks representing family members' birthdays, and tattoos memorializing his friends Ryan Dunn and Zachary Hartwell (members of the Jackass crew who died in a car crash in June 2011).

Pestock is close friends with fellow wrestlers Tyler Breeze and Shawn Spears, singer Tommy Vext (who performed the "I Bring the Darkness" entrance music used by the Baron Corbin character from 2017 until 2021), and WWE commentator Pat McAfee (with the two previously being teammates on the Indianapolis Colts as rookies, during which time they roomed together and bonded over their love of wrestling).

After shaving his head in June 2018, Pestock donated his hair to charity.

He is a Kansas City Chiefs supporter.

== Championships and accomplishments ==
=== Amateur boxing ===
- Golden Gloves of America
  - Regional Golden Gloves champion (two-time; years unknown) (Note: Pestock has been acknowledged as a two-time Golden Gloves regional champion as early as May 2008, although the actual dates of his wins are unknown.)

=== Brazilian jiu-jitsu ===
- International Brazilian Jiu-Jitsu Federation
  - Tampa International Open 2024 gold medal (Master 2 Ultra Heavy)
  - Pan IBJJF Jiu-Jitsu Championship 2025 gold medal (Ultra Heavyweight - Purple Belt)
  - Pan IBJJF Jiu-Jitsu Championship 2025 gold medal (Absolute - Purple Belt)
  - Tampa International Open 2025 double gold medal (Master 2 Ultra Heavy)
- Jiu Jitsu World League
  - Jiu Jitsu World League Florida III gold medal (Adults & Masters Gi) (2023)
  - Jiu Jitsu World League Florida VI silver medal (Adults & Masters Gi) (2024)
  - Jiu Jitsu World League Florida VIIII gold medal (Adults & Masters Gi) (2025)

=== Professional wrestling ===
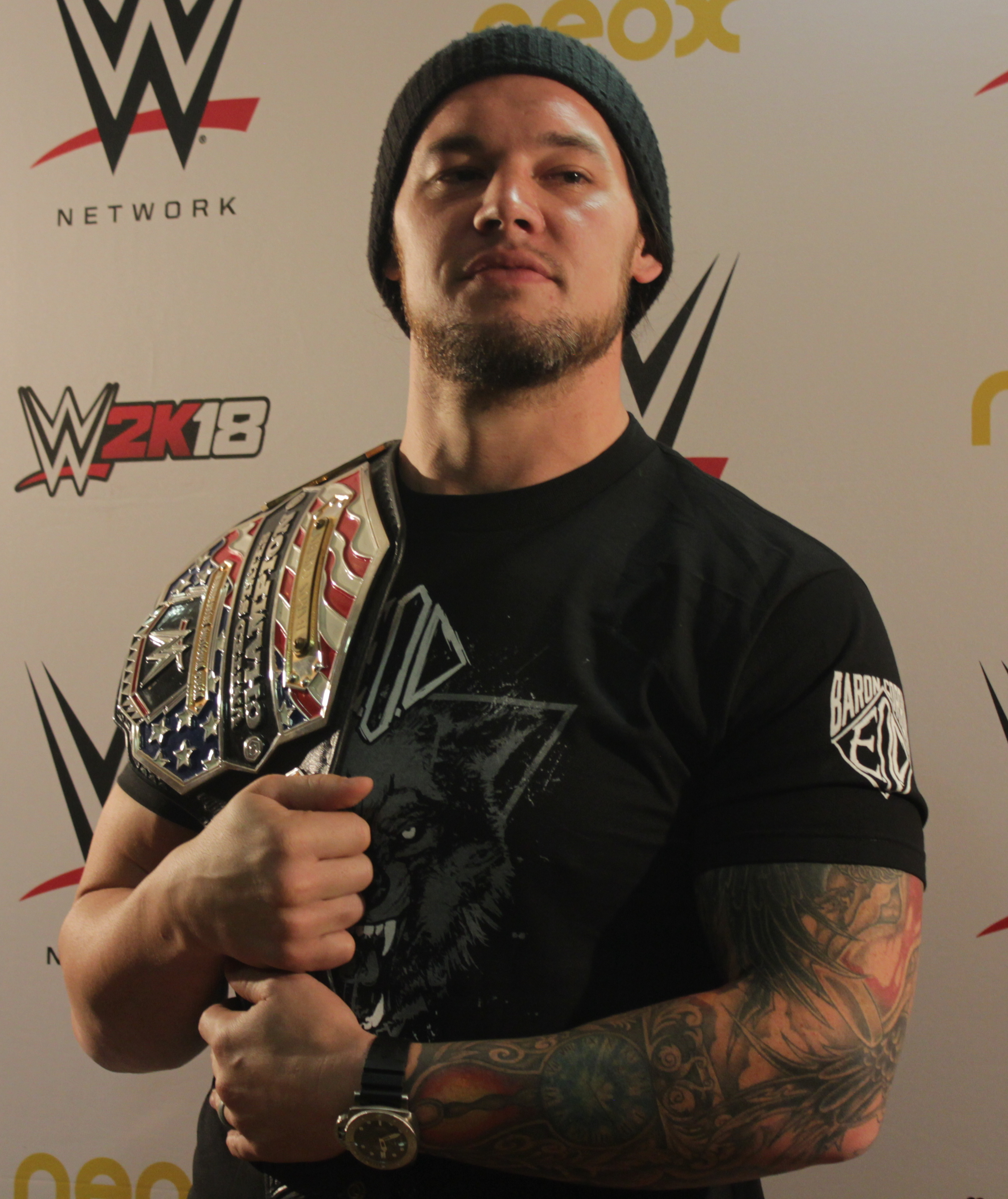
Corbin is a two-time WWE United States Champion.

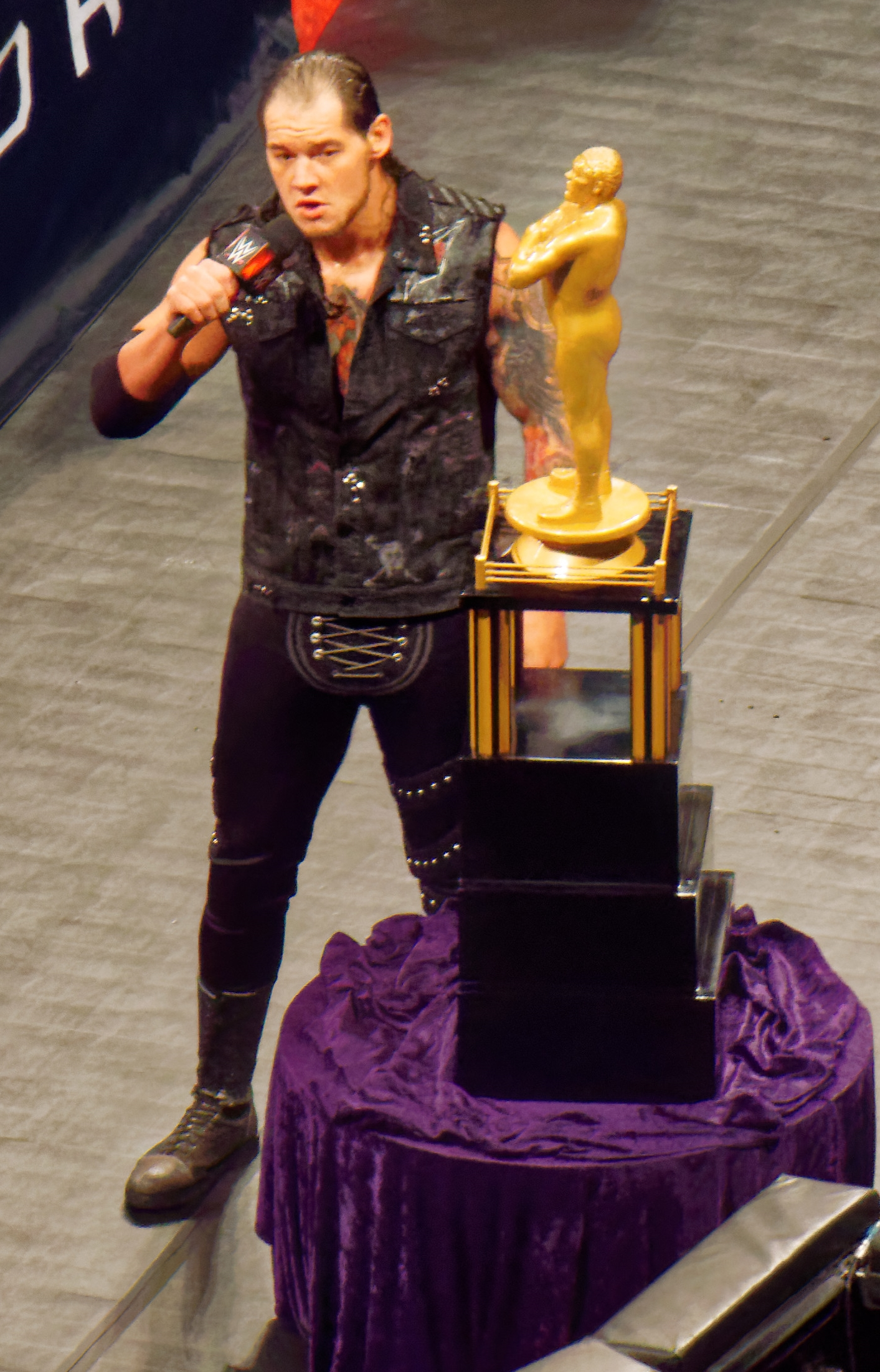
Corbin won the André the Giant Memorial Battle Royal at WrestleMania 32.

- Major League Wrestling
  - MLW World Tag Team Championship (1 time) – with Donovan Dijak
- Pro Wrestling Illustrated
  - Most Hated Wrestler of the Year (2019)
  - Ranked No. 39 of the top 500 singles wrestlers in the PWI 500 in 2019
- Region XV Lucha Libre
  - RXV National Championship (1 time, inaugural)
- Revolver
  - Most Metal Athlete (2016)
- Wrestling Observer Newsletter
  - Most Overrated (2018, 2019)
  - Worst Gimmick (2018)
- WWE
  - WWE United States Championship (2 times)
  - NXT Tag Team Championship (1 time) – with Bron Breakker
  - André the Giant Memorial Battle Royal (2016)
  - Men's Dusty Rhodes Tag Team Classic (2024) – with Bron Breakker
  - King of the Ring (2019)
  - Men's Money in the Bank (2017)
  - WWE Speed Championship #1 Contender Tournament (July 10–24, 2024)
  - WWE Year-End Award
    - Most Hated of the Year (2018)

== See also ==
- List of gridiron football players who became professional wrestlers
