= NXT TakeOver: Dallas =

2016 WWE Network event

- Promotional poster featuring various NXT wrestlers
- Promotion: WWE
- Brand: NXT
- Date: April 1, 2016
- City: Dallas, Texas
- Venue: Kay Bailey Hutchison Convention Center
- Attendance: 9,000 (sold out)

WWE event chronology
← Previous; Roadblock	Next → WrestleMania 32

NXT TakeOver chronology
← Previous; London	Next → The End

NXT TakeOver: Dallas was a 2016 professional wrestling livestreaming event produced by WWE, held exclusively for wrestlers from the promotion's developmental territory, NXT. It was the ninth NXT TakeOver event and took place on Friday, April 1, 2016, at the Kay Bailey Hutchison Convention Center in Dallas, Texas. The event aired exclusively on the WWE Network and was held as part of the WrestleMania 32 weekend festivities, in turn being the first TakeOver to take place during a WrestleMania weekend.

Five matches were contested at the event. In the main event, Finn Bálor defeated Samoa Joe to retain the NXT Championship. Another prominent match included Asuka defeating Bayley to win the NXT Women's Championship: the match was also notable as the start of Asuka's record-setting reign as champion. Additionally, Shinsuke Nakamura, in his WWE debut, defeated Sami Zayn, and Austin Aries, also in his WWE debut, defeated Baron Corbin. The event also saw the final match of Zayn in NXT and Corbin's final match in NXT for seven years.

== Production ==
=== Background ===
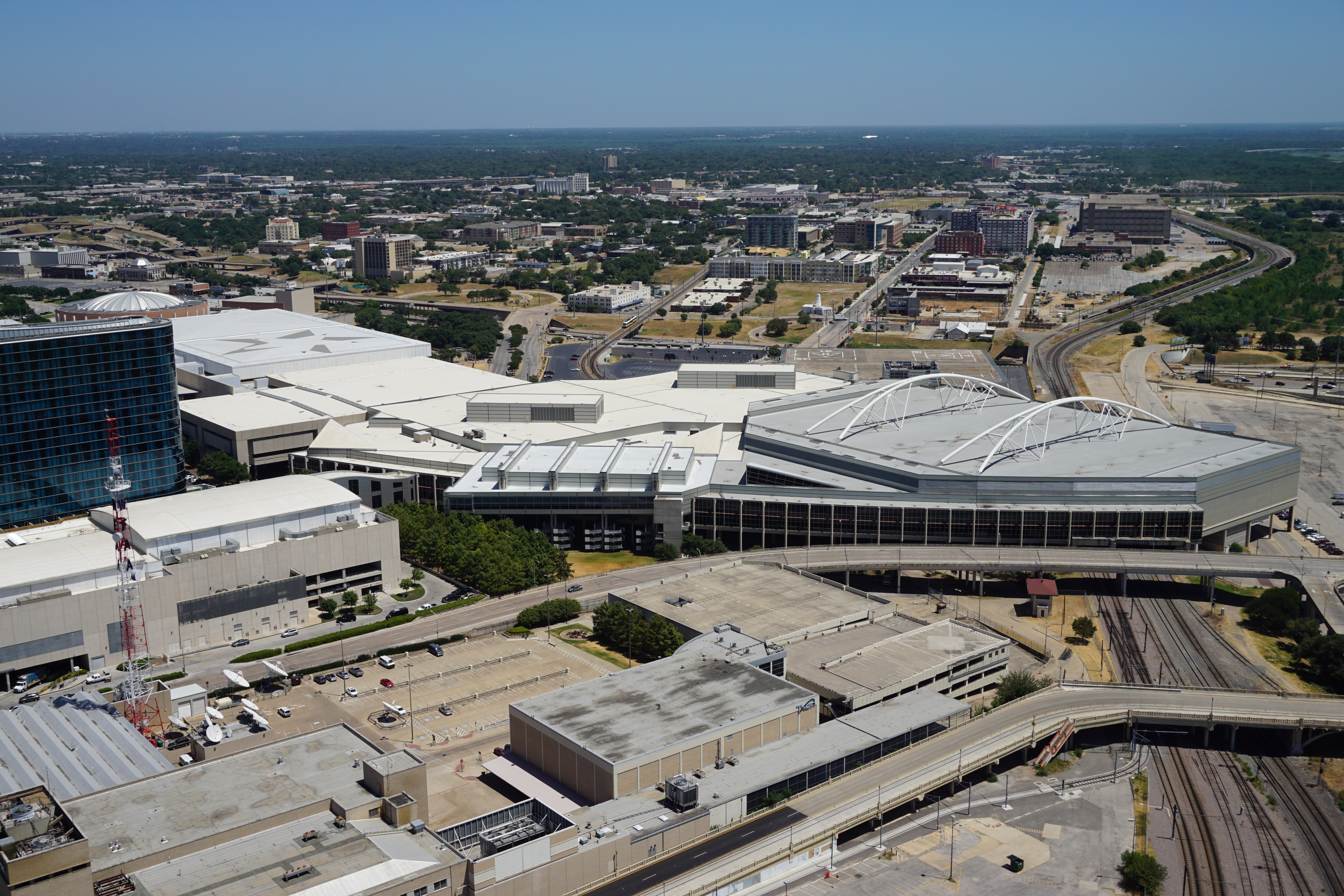
The ninth NXT TakeOver event was held at the Kay Bailey Hutchison Convention Center in Dallas, Texas.

TakeOver was a series of professional wrestling events that began in May 2014, as WWE's developmental territory, NXT, held its second WWE Network-exclusive livestreaming event, billed as TakeOver. The "TakeOver" moniker subsequently became the branding for all of NXT's major events held periodically throughout the year. On December 12, 2015, TakeOver: Dallas was scheduled as the ninth TakeOver event and the first to occur during a WrestleMania Weekend. It was held on Saturday, April 1, 2016, as a support show for WrestleMania 32 for the main roster and took place at the Kay Bailey Hutchison Convention Center, with the event named after the venue's city of Dallas, Texas. Tickets went on sale on December 19, 2015, through Ticketmaster.

Finn Bálor, who was defending the NXT Championship at the event, revealed his original plan for his entrance involving riding a horse, despite never having ridden one. The horse would have played into the Texan culture theme for Bálor's entrance as the event was hosted in Texas. He eventually scrapped the idea when he learned that Triple H attempted a similar feat, in which the horse kept bucking during rehearsals, and those plans were dropped.

=== Storylines ===
The card comprised five matches that resulted from scripted storylines. Results were predetermined by WWE's writers on the NXT brand, while storylines were produced on WWE's weekly television program, NXT.

At TakeOver: London, Finn Bálor successfully retained the NXT Championship against Samoa Joe. At the same event, Baron Corbin defeated Apollo Crews and declared his intentions of going after the NXT Championship, however, Sami Zayn returned from injury at the event also wanting a shot at the title. This led to a triple threat match between Corbin, Zayn, and Joe that took place on January 27 episode of NXT to determine the #1 contender for the NXT Championship. The match ended in a no contest after Corbin submitted to both Zayn's Sharpshooter and Joe's Crossface at the same time. Zayn and Joe faced each other in a #1 contender's match on February 17 episode of NXT, where the match ended in a draw after both men's shoulders were pinned. To resolve this issue, Zayn and Joe faced each other in a two out of three falls match on March 9 episode of NXT, where Joe defeated Zayn to become #1 contender for Finn Bálor's NXT Championship at TakeOver: Dallas.

NXT General Manager William Regal then announced that Zayn would face NXT's newest signing Shinsuke Nakamura at the event.

On the March 2, 2016, episode of NXT, Austin Aries made his debut. However, while walking down to the ring, Baron Corbin attacked Aries. NXT General Manager William Regal announced the next week that both were scheduled for a match at Takeover: Dallas.

On the March 16, 2016, episode of NXT, American Alpha (Chad Gable and Jason Jordan) defeated The Vaudevillains (Aiden English and Simon Gotch) to be the #1 contenders for the NXT Tag Team Championship. They would face The Revival (Scott Dawson and Dash Wilder), who recently beat Enzo Amore and Colin Cassady to retain the titles at Roadblock.

After Bayley retained the NXT Women's Championship against Nia Jax at TakeOver: London, a women's battle royal took place on January 13 episode of NXT to determine the #1 contender for the Women's Championship, which was won by Carmella after she last eliminated Eva Marie. Bayley successfully retained the Women's Championship against Carmella on February 10 episode of NXT. After the match, Carmella was given a post-match beatdown by Marie and Nia Jax with Bayley struggling to fend off until gaining some unlikely assistance by Asuka, who helped fend off Marie and Jax before turning towards Bayley and the Women's Championship, signifying a challenge for the title. After Bayley and Asuka defeated Marie and Jax in a tag team match on the March 16 episode of NXT, NXT General Manager William Regal announced that Bayley would defend the NXT Women's Championship against Asuka at TakeOver: Dallas.

It was announced on WWE's official website, the pre-show panel would consist of Renee Young, Hall of Famer Lita and Mauro Ranallo from SmackDown, and the commentators would still consist of Tom Phillips and Corey Graves.

== Event ==
=== Preliminary matches ===
The first match saw The Revival (Scott Dawson and Dash Wilder) defend the NXT Tag Team Championship against American Alpha (Jason Jordan and Chad Gable). Jordan and Gable executed "Grand Amplitude" on Dawson to win the titles.

Next, Austin Aries faced Baron Corbin. The match ended when Corbin attempted the "End of Days" on Aries, but Aries countered the move and pinned Corbin with a roll-up to win the match.

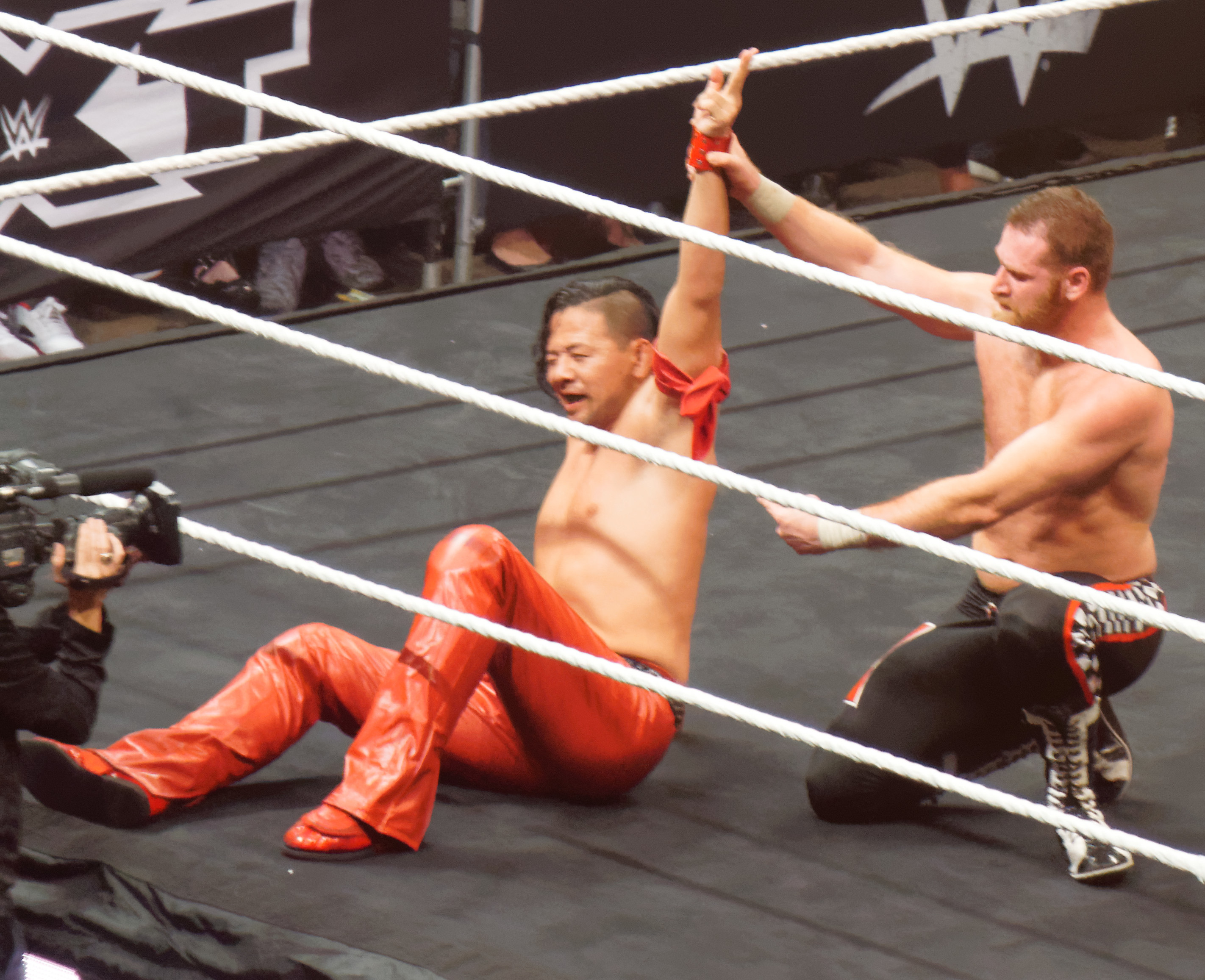
Shinsuke Nakamura and Sami Zayn after their match.

After that, Sami Zayn faced Shinsuke Nakamura. During the match, Nakamura applied a cross armbreaker on Zayn however Zayn escaped. Zayn applied a Koji clutch on Nakamura, but Nakamura countered the move into a pin for a near-fall. Nakamura attempted a "Kinshasa" on Zayn only for Zayn to perform a "Blue Thunder Bomb" on Nakamura for a near-fall. In the end, Zayn attempted an exploder suplex into the turnbuckles on Nakamura, but Nakamura countered into a "Kinshasa" off the middle rope, followed by a second "Kinshasa" to win the match.

The fourth match saw Bayley defend the NXT Women's Championship against Asuka. The ending saw Asuka apply the "Asuka Lock" on Bayley. Bayley passed out, which meant that Asuka won the title by technical submission.

=== Main event ===
In the main event, Finn Bálor defended the NXT Championship against Samoa Joe. The match was repeatedly stopped in order for medical personnel to treat Joe, much to the chagrin of the fans in attendance who initially chanted "Let Joe bleed" which progressed to "PG Sucks" and finally "F*ck PG". Joe began bleeding near the onset of the match. Joe performed a muscle buster on Bálor for a near-fall. Balor performed a "Coup de Grâce" on Joe and attempted a "1916", but Joe countered and applied the "Coquina Clutch" on Balor. Balor used the ring ropes to bridge into a pin on Joe to retain the title.

== Reception ==
The event received acclaim from both critics and fans and is widely considered to be superior than the WrestleMania 32 event held two nights later. Rick Foster wrote for WrestleView: "This is the most fun I have ever had attending a wrestling event ... While the wrestling is exciting and crisp, it's the storylines and characters that you come back for". With fans being "more excited about this NXT special than WrestleMania itself", the atmosphere was "electric" in the arena. Foster rated Nakamura-Zayn as one of the "standout" NXT matches of all time. Despite being "unfamiliar on Nakamura's work over in Japan", Foster "realized that he really is a big deal" when Nakamura "oozed charisma from walking down the ramp all the way to every move he executed". Then as Bayley-Asuka followed Nakamura-Zayn, it "took a little bit for the crowd to get into the" women's match, which "wasn't bad at all". Foster praised Bayley as "an unbelievable face to watch live". Next, the "fun main event" was a "bloodbath" disrupted by doctor stoppages, and "Joe not being intimidated by Finn Balor's Texas Chainsaw Massacre inspired entrance added a nice little vibe for what was to come." Joe was further highlighted as a "wrestling powerhouse". Also, Aries-Corbin was described as "fine", while the tag title match was described as a "fantastic hot opener", with American Alpha having "tremendous look and character". Foster felt "it was exciting to see raw emotion from a tag team for a change". Lastly, Foster concluded that NXT "is no longer developmental" as it has morphed into a "full-fledged brand third brand for the WWE". It was also noticed that Kota Ibushi had appeared in the audience during the event.

James Caldwell of Pro Wrestling Torch was so impressed by Nakamura-Zayn that he rated it 10 stars out of 5. Highlighted was the story of "Zayn having an edge wanting to defend his home turf knowing he was facing one of the top stars in the entire world". Meanwhile, the wrestling "was as if New Japan's product teleported to a WWE ring". Caldwell then declared that Nakamura should main event WrestleMania 32 as he was at a "completely different level than everyone else; the rest of the roster is just living in Nakamura's world". The main event was the second highest rated at 3.5 stars; Balor retaining was "surprising", and the "no-win" "blood situation definitely affected the match". The women's match was rated 3.25 stars, and "Asuka as the dominant, Awesome Kong-like women's champion is a great follow-up to Bayley’s title quest story in the division". The tag match "delivered the desired result" and was rated 3 stars. Lastly, Aries-Corbin featured another "surprise ending" while "Corbin looked good" in the match rated 2.25 stars.

Kyle Johnson of the Wrestling Observer wrote an article focused on Baron Corbin and the two events he wrestled on that week: NXT TakeOver: Dallas and then WrestleMania 32. While WrestleMania had more "spectacle", TakeOver: Dallas was "miles ahead" in terms of "delivering a satisfying, intelligently-put-together professional wrestling show". Positives for NXT's event included "a crowd that was frenzied from start to finish" and "four incredible matches featuring numerous stars who were fully and completely over". A tag title bout that was "white hot" and Nakamura-Zayn "in a match that had some claiming to have seen the face of god himself" were among these four matches. The fifth match, Aries-Corbin, was "quite good for the story it was trying to tell". with Corbin noticeably improving to be "completely natural and right at home" in the ring being "proof positive that the [developmental] system can work in creating talents from scratch". Ultimately, the "weekend marked another significant milestone in the growth of NXT as a brand".

Ravi Sinha of IGN India also compared TakeOver: Dallas and WrestleMania 32, and endorsed the "excellent" NXT event as the "obvious" winner despite "a fraction of the budget". While WrestleMania "felt long" and "wasn't amazing", TakeOver: Dallas had the best match of the two events ("and perhaps of the year"), due to its "pure wrestling and story-telling" strength, and was further boosted due to three "great" title matches and "a strong undercard match" in Aries-Corbin where Corbin played a "no-nonsense jerk" well. The tag title match was "full of solid tag team action to get the crowd pumped"; the women's title match had "great drama" and "raw emotion on display"; while Joe's bleeding in the main event made it feel "real" and "dangerous".

Nick Schwartz of FoxSports.com wrote that "the 20 minutes of near-perfection" of Nakamura-Zayn even outshone the "magnificent spectacle" and "amazing moments" of WrestleMania 32. While Schwartz praised Zayn as a "tremendous wrestler", it was Nakamura that was highlighted for his "charisma, his effortless style, his technical acumen", and having for "elevated" Zayn. Although Nakamura was completely new to WWE, Schwartz said that he "instantly became one of the biggest stars in WWE."

== Aftermath ==
As he retained the championship, Finn Bálor went on to surpass Neville as the longest reigning NXT Champion. On April 21 during a live event in Lowell, Massachusetts, Bálor lost the NXT Championship to Samoa Joe, ending his reign at 292 days.

Baron Corbin wrestled at WrestleMania 32 for his main roster debut; participating and winning the Andre the Giant memorial battle royal. Kyle Johnson of the Wrestling Observer noted that Corbin's win was "overwhelmingly cheered" despite him being a villainous character and winning by eliminating "a 20-year veteran" in Kane. Corbin's win also resulted in an "NXT" chant, which Johnson credited as "not merely a win for Baron, but a win for NXT as a whole". For the same event, Nick Schwartz of FoxSports.com wrote that Shinsuke Nakamura had been so captivating during TakeOver: Dallas that fans chanted his name during the WrestleMania main event between Triple H and Roman Reigns.

== Results ==
No.	Results	Stipulations	Times
1	American Alpha (Chad Gable and Jason Jordan) defeated The Revival (Dash Wilder and Scott Dawson) (c) by pinfall	Tag team match for the NXT Tag Team Championship	15:11
2	Austin Aries defeated Baron Corbin by pinfall	Singles match	10:43
3	Shinsuke Nakamura defeated Sami Zayn by pinfall	Singles match	20:07
4	Asuka defeated Bayley (c) by technical submission	Singles match for the NXT Women's Championship	15:25
5	Finn Bálor (c) defeated Samoa Joe by pinfall	Singles match for the NXT Championship	16:22
(c) / – the champion(s) heading into the match
