= NXT Year-End Award =

Professional wrestling award

NXT Year-End Awards
- 2017 NXT Year-End Awards logo
- Country: United States
- Presented by: WWE
- First award: January 13, 2016; 10 years ago

The NXT Year-End Awards is a concept used by WWE, where awards, similar to the Academy, Grammy and WWE's own Slammy Awards, are given to professional wrestlers who have competed in NXT in the previous year. There have been five editions of the concept. Fans cast votes online, via Twitter or WWE's website, to decide the winners. Recipients of the award are given a golden ring bell with a hammer.

Starting with the 2019 edition, the NXT Year-End Awards also recognize wrestlers from the NXT UK brand.

== Editions ==
=== 2015 NXT Year-End Awards ===
The award winners were announced on the January 13, 2016 episode of NXT via video presentation. Votes were cast through WWE's website.

Winners are listed first and highlighted in boldface.

**Male Competitor of the Year**: **Finn Bálor**; Kevin Owens; Samoa Joe; Sami Zayn; Tyler Breeze	**Female Competitor of the Year**: **Bayley**; Sasha Banks; Charlotte; Becky Lynch; Asuka
**Overall Competitor of the Year**: **Finn Bálor**; All Male and Female Competitor of the Year nominees were eligible	**Tag Team of the Year**: **Enzo Amore and Colin Cassady**; Blake and Murphy; The Vaudevillains (Aiden English and Simon Gotch); The Revival (Scott Dawson and Dash Wilder); The Lucha Dragons (Kalisto and Sin Cara)
**TakeOver of the Year**: **TakeOver: Brooklyn**; TakeOver: Rival; TakeOver: Respect; TakeOver: London; TakeOver: Unstoppable	**Match of the Year**: **Sasha Banks (c) vs. Bayley for the NXT Women's Championship at TakeOver: Brooklyn**; Kevin Owens (c) vs. Finn Bálor for the NXT Championship at The Beast in the East; Charlotte (c) vs. Sasha Banks vs. Bayley vs. Becky Lynch in a Fatal 4-Way match for the NXT Women's Championship at TakeOver: Rival; Finn Bálor (c) vs. Samoa Joe for the NXT Championship at TakeOver: London; Sami Zayn (c) vs. Kevin Owens for the NXT Championship at TakeOver: Rival; Bayley (c) vs. Sasha Banks in a 30-Minute Iron Man match for the NXT Women's Championship at TakeOver: Respect; Sasha Banks (c) vs. Becky Lynch for the NXT Women's Championship at TakeOver: Unstoppable; Sasha Banks (c) vs. Charlotte for the NXT Women's Championship on NXT (July 15); Finn Bálor vs. Adrian Neville to determine the No. 1 contender for the NXT Championship at TakeOver: Rival; Kevin Owens (c) vs. Finn Bálor for the NXT Championship on NXT (March 25)

=== 2016 NXT Year-End Awards ===
The award winners were announced on the TakeOver: San Antonio pre-show on January 28, 2017. Votes were cast through Twitter.

Winners are listed first and highlighted in boldface.

**Male Competitor of the Year**: **Shinsuke Nakamura**; Samoa Joe; Finn Bálor; Bobby Roode	**Female Competitor of the Year**: **Asuka**; Nia Jax; Bayley
**Overall Competitor of the Year**: **Shinsuke Nakamura**; Asuka	**Tag Team of the Year**: **The Revival (Scott Dawson and Dash Wilder)**; American Alpha (Jason Jordan and Chad Gable); The Authors of Pain (Akam and Rezar); TM-61 (Nick Miller and Shane Thorne); #DIY (Johnny Gargano and Tommaso Ciampa)
**Breakout of the Year**: **Billie Kay and Peyton Royce**; Andrade "Cien" Almas; Ember Moon; No Way Jose; Sanity (Eric Young, Alexander Wolfe, Sawyer Fulton, and Nikki Cross)	**TakeOver of the Year**: **Winning event was never announced**; TakeOver: Dallas; TakeOver: Toronto; TakeOver: The End; TakeOver: Brooklyn II
**Match of the Year**: **The Revival (Scott Dawson and Dash Wilder) (c) vs. #DIY (Johnny Gargano and Tommaso Ciampa) in a two-out-of-three falls match for the NXT Tag Team Championship at TakeOver: Toronto**; Finn Bálor vs. Shinsuke Nakamura on NXT (July 13); Asuka (c) vs. Mickie James for the NXT Women's Championship at TakeOver: Toronto; American Alpha (Jason Jordan and Chad Gable) (c) vs. The Revival (Scott Dawson and Dash Wilder) for the NXT Tag Team Championship at TakeOver: The End; Sami Zayn vs. Shinsuke Nakamura at TakeOver: Dallas; Bayley (c) vs. Asuka for the NXT Women's Championship at TakeOver: Dallas; Sami Zayn vs. Samoa Joe in a Two-out-of-three falls match to determine the No. 1 contender for the NXT Championship on NXT (March 9); Samoa Joe (c) vs. Finn Bálor for the NXT Championship in a Steel Cage match at TakeOver: The End; Bayley vs. Nia Jax on NXT (July 20); Tye Dillinger vs. Bobby Roode at TakeOver: Toronto; Neville vs. Finn Bálor on NXT (March 2); Shinsuke Nakamura (c) vs. Samoa Joe for the NXT Championship at TakeOver: Toronto; The Revival (Scott Dawson and Dash Wilder) (c) vs. American Alpha (Jason Jordan and Chad Gable) in a Two-out-of-three falls match for the NXT Tag Team Championship on NXT (July 6)

=== 2017 NXT Year-End Awards ===
The award winners were announced on TakeOver: Philadelphia on January 27, 2018. Votes were cast through Twitter.

Winners are listed first and highlighted in boldface.

**Male Competitor of the Year**: **Aleister Black**; Bobby Roode; Drew McIntyre; Andrade "Cien" Almas; Roderick Strong	**Female Competitor of the Year**: **Asuka**; Ember Moon; Nikki Cross; Ruby Riott; The Iconic Duo (Billie Kay and Peyton Royce)
**Overall Competitor of the Year**: **Asuka**; Aleister Black	**Tag Team of the Year**: **Sanity (Eric Young, Alexander Wolfe, and Killian Dain)**; The Authors of Pain (Akam and Rezar); The Revival (Scott Dawson and Dash Wilder); The Undisputed Era (Bobby Fish and Kyle O'Reilly); #DIY (Johnny Gargano and Tommaso Ciampa)
**Rivalry of the Year**: **Aleister Black vs. Velveteen Dream**; Shinsuke Nakamura vs. Bobby Roode; Ember Moon vs. Asuka; Tyler Bate vs. Pete Dunne; The Undisputed Era (Adam Cole, Bobby Fish, and Kyle O'Reilly) vs. Sanity (Alexander Wolfe, Eric Young, Killian Dain, and Nikki Cross); Kassius Ohno vs. Hideo Itami; #DIY (Johnny Gargano and Tommaso Ciampa) vs. The Authors of Pain (Akam and Rezar)	**Breakout Star of the Year**: **Aleister Black**; Andrade "Cien" Almas with Zelina Vega; The Undisputed Era (Adam Cole, Bobby Fish, and Kyle O'Reilly); Sonya Deville; Ruby Riott; Velveteen Dream; Lars Sullivan
**TakeOver of the Year**: **TakeOver: WarGames**; TakeOver: San Antonio; TakeOver: Orlando; TakeOver: Brooklyn III; TakeOver: Chicago	**Future Star of NXT**: **Cezar Bononi**; Street Profits (Angelo Dawkins and Montez Ford); Heavy Machinery (Otis Dozovic and Tucker Knight); Shayna Baszler; Kairi Sane; Fabian Aichner; Lio Rush; Bianca Belair; Lacey Evans
**Match of the Year**: **Tyler Bate (c) vs. Pete Dunne for the WWE United Kingdom Championship at TakeOver: Chicago**; Johnny Gargano vs. Andrade "Cien" Almas at TakeOver: Brooklyn III; Asuka (c) vs. Ember Moon for the NXT Women's Championship at TakeOver: Brooklyn III; Drew McIntyre (c) vs. Andrade "Cien" Almas for the NXT Championship at TakeOver: WarGames; The Authors of Pain (Akam and Rezar) (c) vs. The Revival (Scott Dawson and Dash Wilder) vs. #DIY (Johnny Gargano and Tommaso Ciampa) in a Triple threat elimination match for the NXT Tag Team Championship at TakeOver: Orlando; The Undisputed Era (Adam Cole, Bobby Fish, and Kyle O'Reilly) vs. The Authors of Pain (Akam and Rezar) and Roderick Strong vs. Sanity (Alexander Wolfe, Eric Young, and Killian Dain) in a WarGames match at TakeOver: WarGames; Asuka (c) vs. Nikki Cross in a Last Woman Standing match for the NXT Women's Championship on NXT (June 28); The Authors of Pain (Akam and Rezar) (c) vs. #DIY (Johnny Gargano and Tommaso Ciampa) in a Ladder match for the NXT Tag Team Championship at TakeOver: Chicago; Bobby Roode (c) vs. Roderick Strong for the NXT Championship on NXT (June 5); NXT Women's Championship Qualifying Battle Royal on NXT (October 25)*; Aleister Black vs. Velveteen Dream at TakeOver: WarGames; Johnny Gargano vs. Kassius Ohno on NXT (December 6)

- Competitors in the match were Abbey Laith, Aliyah, Bianca Belair, Billie Kay, Candice LeRae, Dakota Kai, Lacey Evans, Mercedes Martinez, Nikki Cross, Reina Gonzalez, Rhea Ripley, Sage Beckett, Santana Garrett, Sarah Logan, Taynara Conti, Vanessa Borne and Zeda.

=== 2018 NXT Year-End Awards ===
The award winners were announced on the TakeOver: Phoenix pre-show on January 26, 2019. Votes were cast through Twitter.

Winners are listed first and highlighted in boldface.

**Male Competitor of the Year**: **Tommaso Ciampa**; Johnny Gargano; Ricochet; Aleister Black; Velveteen Dream; Andrade "Cien" Almas; Adam Cole; Pete Dunne	**Female Competitor of the Year**: **Kairi Sane**; Nikki Cross; Shayna Baszler; Ember Moon; Bianca Belair
**Overall Competitor of the Year**: **Kairi Sane**; Tommaso Ciampa	**Tag Team of the Year**: **The Undisputed Era (Kyle O'Reilly and Roderick Strong)**; War Raiders (Hanson and Rowe); The Street Profits (Angelo Dawkins and Montez Ford); Heavy Machinery (Otis Dozovic and Tucker Knight); Danny Burch and Oney Lorcan; Moustache Mountain (Trent Seven and Tyler Bate)
**Rivalry of the Year**: **Johnny Gargano vs. Tommaso Ciampa**; Kairi Sane vs. Shayna Baszler; Aleister Black/Johnny Gargano/Tommaso Ciampa/Nikki Cross; Johnny Gargano vs. Andrade "Cien" Almas; Moustache Mountain (Trent Seven and Tyler Bate) vs. The Undisputed Era (Kyle O'Reilly and Roderick Strong); Ember Moon vs. Shayna Baszler; Ricochet vs. Velveteen Dream	**Breakout Star of the Year**: **Ricochet**; Bianca Belair; Lacey Evans; Rhea Ripley; Dakota Kai; Lars Sullivan; War Raiders (Hanson and Rowe); EC3
**TakeOver of the Year**: **TakeOver: New Orleans**; TakeOver: Philadelphia; TakeOver: Chicago II; TakeOver: Brooklyn 4; TakeOver: WarGames	**Future Star of NXT**: **Io Shirai**; Matt Riddle; Keith Lee; Mia Yim; The Forgotten Sons (Steve Cutler, Wesley Blake, and Jaxson Ryker); Dominik Dijakovic; Candice LeRae; Marina Shafir and Jessamyn Duke; Kona Reeves
**Match of the Year**: **Andrade "Cien" Almas (c) vs. Johnny Gargano for the NXT Championship at TakeOver: Philadelphia**; Pete Dunne, Ricochet, and War Raiders (Hanson and Rowe) vs. The Undisputed Era (Adam Cole, Bobby Fish, Kyle O'Reilly, and Roderick Strong) in a WarGames match at TakeOver: WarGames; Moustache Mountain (Trent Seven and Tyler Bate) (c) vs. The Undisputed Era (Kyle O'Reilly and Roderick Strong) for the NXT Tag Team Championship on NXT (July 11); Johnny Gargano vs. Tommaso Ciampa in an Unsanctioned match at TakeOver: New Orleans; Adam Cole vs. EC3 vs. Killian Dain vs. Lars Sullivan vs. Ricochet vs. Velveteen Dream in a Ladder match for the inaugural NXT North American Championship at TakeOver: New Orleans; Shayna Baszler (c) vs. Kairi Sane for the NXT Women's Championship at TakeOver: Brooklyn 4; Ricochet vs. Velveteen Dream at TakeOver: Chicago II; Aleister Black (c) vs. Tommaso Ciampa for the NXT Championship on NXT (July 25); Pete Dunne (c) vs. Zack Gibson for the WWE United Kingdom Championship on NXT (August 22); Aleister Black vs. Adam Cole in an Extreme Rules match at TakeOver: Philadelphia; Pete Dunne (c) vs. Kyle O'Reilly for the WWE United Kingdom Championship on NXT (June 13); The Undisputed Era (Kyle O'Reilly and Roderick Strong) (c) vs. Danny Burch and Oney Lorcan for the NXT Tag Team Championship at TakeOver: Chicago II; Nikki Cross vs. Bianca Belair on NXT (September 12); Ricochet (NA-c) vs. Pete Dunne (UK-c) in a Champion vs. Champion match for both the NXT North American Championship and the WWE United Kingdom Championship on NXT (September 19); Ricochet (c) vs. Pete Dunne vs. Adam Cole in a Triple threat match for the NXT North American Championship on NXT (October 10)

=== 2019 NXT Year-End Awards ===
The award winners were announced on the January 1, 2020 episode of NXT. Votes were cast through Twitter and WWE's website.

Winners are listed first and highlighted in boldface.

**Male Competitor of the Year**: **Adam Cole**; Tommaso Ciampa; Johnny Gargano; Velveteen Dream; Walter; Tyler Bate	**Female Competitor of the Year**: **Shayna Baszler**; Io Shirai; Rhea Ripley; Kay Lee Ray; Toni Storm; Bianca Belair
**Overall Competitor of the Year**: **Adam Cole**; Shayna Baszler	**Tag Team of the Year**: **The Undisputed Era (Bobby Fish and Kyle O'Reilly)**; The Street Profits (Angelo Dawkins and Montez Ford); Grizzled Young Veterans (James Drake and Zack Gibson); Flash Morgan Webster and Mark Andrews; The Viking Raiders (Erik and Ivar)
**Rivalry of the Year**: **Johnny Gargano vs. Adam Cole**; Candice LeRae vs. Io Shirai; Rhea Ripley vs. Shayna Baszler; British Strong Style (Pete Dunne, Trent Seven, and Tyler Bate) vs. Imperium (Walter, Alexander Wolfe, Fabian Aichner, and Marcel Barthel); Velveteen Dream vs. Roderick Strong	**Breakout Star of the Year**: **Keith Lee**; Dominik Dijakovic; Matt Riddle; Candice LeRae; Damian Priest; Angel Garza; Rhea Ripley; Joe Coffey; Piper Niven
**TakeOver of the Year**: **TakeOver: WarGames**; TakeOver: Phoenix; TakeOver: Blackpool; TakeOver: New York; TakeOver: XXV; TakeOver: Toronto; TakeOver: Cardiff	**Future Star of NXT**: **Dakota Kai**; Cameron Grimes; Kushida; Isaiah "Swerve" Scott; Tegan Nox; Xia Li; Taynara; Bronson Reed; Ilja Dragunov
**Match of the Year**: **Johnny Gargano vs. Adam Cole in a Two-out-of-three falls match for the vacant NXT Championship at TakeOver: New York**; Rhea Ripley, Candice LeRae, Dakota Kai, and Tegan Nox vs. Shayna Baszler, Io Shirai, Bianca Belair, and Kay Lee Ray in a WarGames match at TakeOver: WarGames; Walter (c) vs. Tyler Bate for the WWE United Kingdom Championship at TakeOver: Cardiff; Shayna Baszler (c) vs. Io Shirai in a Steel Cage match for the NXT Women's Championship on NXT (June 26); Candice LeRae vs. Io Shirai at TakeOver Toronto; Adam Cole (c) vs. Johnny Gargano in a Two-out-of-three falls match for the NXT Championship at TakeOver: Toronto; The Undisputed Era (Kyle O'Reilly and Roderick Strong) (c) vs. The Viking Raiders (Erik and Ivar) for the NXT Tag Team Championship at TakeOver: Phoenix; The Street Profits (Angelo Dawkins and Montez Ford) vs. The Forgotten Sons (Steve Cutler and Wesley Blake) vs. Oney Lorcan and Danny Burch vs. The Undisputed Era (Bobby Fish and Kyle O'Reilly) in a Fatal Four-Way Ladder match for the vacant NXT Tag Team Championship at TakeOver: XXV; Adam Cole (c) vs. Pete Dunne for the NXT Championship at Survivor Series; Keith Lee vs. Dominik Dijakovic on NXT (August 28); Candice LeRae vs. Bianca Belair vs. Io Shirai vs. Mia Yim to determine the No. 1 contender for the NXT Women's Championship on NXT (September 18); Grizzled Young Veterans (James Drake and Zack Gibson) (c) vs. Flash Morgan Webster and Mark Andrews vs. Gallus (Mark Coffey and Wolfgang) in a triple threat tag team match for the NXT UK Tag Team Championship at TakeOver: Cardiff

=== 2020 NXT Year-End Awards ===
The award winners were announced on the December 30, 2020 on WWE.com. Votes were cast through WWE's website.

Winners are listed first and highlighted in boldface.

**Male Competitor of the Year**: **Adam Cole**; Finn Bálor; Johnny Gargano; Keith Lee; Walter; Tommaso Ciampa	**Female Competitor of the Year**: **Io Shirai**; Rhea Ripley; Candice LeRae; Dakota Kai; Kay Lee Ray; Tegan Nox
**Overall Competitor of the Year**: **Io Shirai**; Adam Cole	**Tag Team of the Year**: **The Undisputed Era (Adam Cole, Bobby Fish, Kyle O'Reilly, and Roderick Strong)**; Oney Lorcan and Danny Burch; Breezango (Tyler Breeze and Fandango); Imperium (Walter, Alexander Wolfe, Fabian Aichner, and Marcel Barthel); Gallus (Joe Coffey, Mark Coffey, and Wolfgang); Legado Del Fantasma (Santos Escobar, Raul Mendoza, and Joaquin Wilde)
**Rivalry of the Year**: **Adam Cole vs. Pat McAfee**; Candice LeRae vs. Io Shirai; Damian Priest vs. Johnny Gargano; Dexter Lumis vs. Cameron Grimes; Shotzi Blackheart vs. Robert Stone; Rhea Ripley vs. Raquel González; Walter vs. Ilja Dragunov; Kay Lee Ray vs. Piper Niven	**Breakout Star of the Year**: **Shotzi Blackheart**; Pat McAfee; Damian Priest; Cameron Grimes; Dexter Lumis; Timothy Thatcher; Raquel Gonzalez; Santos Escobar; Ilja Dragunov
**Event of the Year**: **TakeOver: WarGames**; TakeOver: Blackpool II; TakeOver: Portland; TakeOver: In Your House; The Great American Bash; TakeOver XXX; TakeOver 31; Halloween Havoc	**Future Star of NXT**: **Austin Theory**; Jake Atlas; Leon Ruff; Kacy Catanzaro; Kayden Carter; Indi Hartwell; Xia Li; A-Kid; Aoife Valkyrie; Pretty Deadly (Lewis Howley and Sam Stoker)
**Match of the Year**: **Finn Bálor (c) vs. Kyle O'Reilly for the NXT Championship at TakeOver 31**; Finn Bálor vs. Tommaso Ciampa vs. Adam Cole vs. Johnny Gargano in a Fatal 4-Way Iron Man match for the vacant NXT Championship at Super Tuesday; Adam Cole vs. Finn Bálor for the vacant NXT Championship at Super Tuesday II (September 8); Johnny Gargano vs. Tommaso Ciampa: One Final Beat on NXT (April 8); Keith Lee (c-NA) vs. Adam Cole (c-NXT) in a Winner Takes All match for both the NXT Championship and NXT North American Championship at The Great American Bash; Damian Priest vs. Bronson Reed vs. Cameron Grimes vs. Johnny Gargano vs. Velveteen Dream in a Ladder match for the vacant NXT North American Championship at TakeOver XXX; Io Shirai (c) vs. Candice LeRae in a Tables, Ladders and Scares match for the NXT Women's Championship at Halloween Havoc; Walter (c) vs. Ilja Dragunov for the NXT UK Championship on NXT UK (October 29); The Undisputed Era (Adam Cole, Kyle O'Reilly, Roderick Strong, and Bobby Fish) vs. Team McAfee (Pat McAfee, Pete Dunne, Danny Burch, and Oney Lorcan) in a WarGames match at TakeOver: WarGames; Team Candice (Candice LeRae, Dakota Kai, Raquel González, and Toni Storm) vs. Team Shotzi (Shotzi Blackheart, Ember Moon, Rhea Ripley, and Io Shirai) in a WarGames match at TakeOver: WarGames; Charlotte Flair (c) vs. Rhea Ripley vs. Io Shirai in a Triple Threat match for the NXT Women's Championship at TakeOver: In Your House; Gallus (Mark Coffey and Wolfgang) (c) vs. Imperium (Fabian Aichner and Marcel Barthel) vs. Grizzled Young Veterans (Zack Gibson and James Drake) vs. Mark Andrews and Flash Morgan Webster in a Fatal 4-way tag team ladder match for the NXT UK Tag Team Championship at TakeOver: Blackpool II; Tyler Bate vs. Jordan Devlin at TakeOver: Blackpool II; Bronson Reed vs. Roderick Strong vs. Johnny Gargano in a Triple Threat match to qualify for the vacant NXT North American Championship Ladder match at NXT TakeOver: XXX on NXT (July 22); Matt Riddle vs. Timothy Thatcher in a Fight Pit match with Kurt Angle as the special guest referee on NXT (May 27)

=== 2023 NXT Year-End Awards ===
The winners were announced on December 26, 2023, on NXT. Votes were cast through WWE's website.

Winners are listed first and highlighted in boldface.

**Male Competitor of the Year**: **Ilja Dragunov**; Axiom; Baron Corbin; Bron Breakker; Carmelo Hayes; Dijak; Dragon Lee; Nathan Frazer; Trick Williams; Wes Lee	**Female Competitor of the Year**: **Tiffany Stratton**; Fallon Henley; Gigi Dolin; Ivy Nile; Jacy Jayne; Kelani Jordan; Kiana James; Lyra Valkyria; Roxanne Perez; Thea Hail
**Tag Team of the Year**: **The Creed Brothers (Brutus Creed and Julius Creed)**; Alba Fyre and Isla Dawn; Brooks Jensen and Josh Briggs; Hank Walker and Tank Ledger; Gallus (Joe Coffey, Mark Coffey, and Wolfgang); Katana Chance and Kayden Carter; Tony D'Angelo and Channing "Stacks" Lorenzo	**Moment of the Year**: **The Undertaker appears on NXT (October 10)**; Baron Corbin and Bron Breakker crash through Shawn Michaels' office wall on NXT (September 26); Bron Breakker smashes Von Wagner with steel steps on NXT (September 5); Bron Breakker spears Carmelo Hayes through a wall at NXT Spring Breakin'; Dominik Mysterio ends Wes Lee's historic North American Championship reign on NXT (July 18); Fallon Henley dresses up as Tiffany Stratton at NXT Halloween Havoc Night 1; The #FreeTonyD movement on NXT (May 16 – July 18); Jacy Jayne kicks Gigi Dolin through a door on NXT (February 7); Lash Legend slams Otis on NXT (December 5); Roxanne Perez collapses after defeating Meiko Satomura at NXT Roadblock; Trick Williams gets attacked by a mystery assailant on NXT (October 17)
**Match of the Year**: **Carmelo Hayes (c) vs. Ilja Dragunov for the NXT Championship at NXT No Mercy**; Axiom vs. Tyler Bate in a NXT Global Heritage Invitational match on NXT (September 12); Becky Lynch (c) vs. Tiffany Stratton in an Extreme Rules match for the NXT Women's Championship at NXT No Mercy; Dragon Lee vs. JD McDonagh on NXT (May 2); Eddy Thorpe vs. Damon Kemp in a NXT Underground match on NXT (July 4); Ilja Dragunov vs. Dijak in a Last Man Standing match at NXT Battleground; Johnny Gargano vs. Grayson Waller in an Unsanctioned match at NXT Stand & Deliver; Bron Breakker vs. Dijak vs. Josh Briggs vs. Trick Williams vs. Tyler Bate in an Iron Survivor Challenge to determine the #1 contender for the NXT Championship at NXT Deadline; Roxanne Perez vs. Blair Davenport in a Weapons Wild match at NXT The Great American Bash; Roxanne Perez vs. Kiana James in a Devil's Playground Match at NXT Halloween Havoc Night 1; Seth "Freakin" Rollins (c) vs. Bron Breakker for the World Heavyweight Championship at NXT Gold Rush Week 1

=== 2024 NXT Year-End Awards ===
The winners were announced on December 31, 2024, on NXT. Voting was cast through WWE's website.

Winners are listed first and highlighted in boldface.

**Male Superstar of the Year**: **Oba Femi**; Trick Williams; Tony D'Angelo; Ethan Page	**Female Superstar of the Year**: **Roxanne Perez**; Lola Vice; Jaida Parker; Kelani Jordan
**Tag Team of the Year**: **Nathan Frazer and Axiom**; The Meta-Four (Lash Legend and Jakara Jackson); Chase U (Andre Chase, Duke Hudson, Ridge Holland, Riley Osborne, and Thea Hail); Hank Walker and Tank Ledger	**Moment of the Year**: **Joe Hendry in NXT (June 18-September 1)**; Tyrese Haliburton cuts down Orlando crowd on NXT (September 17); Jaida Parker smashing a brick on Lola Vice at NXT 2300; Carmelo Hayes turns on Trick Williams at NXT Vengeance Day; Trick Williams wins his first NXT Championship at NXT Spring Breakin' Week 1; Ethan Page falls into winning the NXT Championship at NXT Heatwave; Wes Lee turns on Zachary Wentz and Trey Miguel on NXT (August 7); Giulia debuts at NXT No Mercy; NXT launches on the CW Network in Chicago (October 1); Giulia, Jordynne Grace, Kelani Jordan, Stephanie Vaquer, and Zaria vs. Cora Jade, Roxanne Perez, and Fatal Influence (Fallon Henley, Jacy Jayne, and Jazmyn Nyx) in a 10-woman tag team match main events NXT 2300; Chase U calendar sales save Chase U from going bankrupt at NXT Vengeance Day
**Match of the Year**: **Oba Femi (c) vs. Josh Briggs vs. Dijak in a triple threat match for the NXT North American Championship at NXT Stand & Deliver**; Ilja Dragunov (c) vs. Trick Williams for the NXT Championship at NXT Vengeance Day; Nathan Frazer and Axiom (c) vs. Chase U (Andre Chase and Duke Hudson) for the NXT Tag Team Championship at NXT Heatwave; Roxanne Perez (c) vs. Thea Hail for the NXT Women's Championship at NXT The Great American Bash Week 1; Giulia vs. Sol Ruca vs. Stephanie Vaquer vs. Zaria vs. Wren Sinclair in the Women's Iron Survivor Challenge at NXT Deadline; Kelani Jordan (c) vs. Sol Ruca for the NXT Women's North American Championship at NXT Heatwave	**Best PLE/Show of The Year**: **NXT Stand & Deliver**; NXT New Year's Evil; NXT Vengeance Day; NXT Roadblock; NXT Spring Breakin'; NXT Battleground; NXT The Great American Bash; NXT Heatwave; NXT No Mercy; NXT Halloween Havoc; NXT 2300; NXT Deadline

=== 2025 NXT Year-End Awards ===
The winners were announced on December 30, 2025, on NXT. Voting was cast through WWE's website.

Winners are listed first and highlighted in boldface.

**Male Superstar of the Year**: **Je'Von Evans**; Oba Femi; Ricky Saints; Trick Williams; Ethan Page	**Female Superstar of the Year**: **Sol Ruca**; Jacy Jayne; Blake Monroe; Tatum Paxley; Kelani Jordan
**Tag Team of the Year**: **ZaRuca (Zaria and Sol Ruca)**; DarkState (Cutler James, Dion Lennox, Osiris Griffin, and Saquon Shugars); Hank & Tank (Hank Walker and Tank Ledger); Fatal Influence (Jacy Jayne, Fallon Henley, Lainey Reid, and Jazmyn Nyx); The Culling (Shawn Spears, Izzi Dame, Niko Vance, Brooks Jensen, and Tatum Paxley)	**Moment of the Year**: **Tatum Paxley wins the NXT Women's Championship at Halloween Havoc**; NXT vs. TNA brawl on NXT (Sept. 30); Blake Monroe debut on NXT (Jun. 3); Ricky Saints debut on NXT (Feb. 11); Stephanie Vaquer becomes a double champion at Roadblock; Jacy Jayne defeats Stephanie Vaquer to become the NXT Women's Champion on NXT (May 27); Channing "Stacks" Lorenzo turns on Tony D'Angelo at Stand & Deliver; Trick Williams wins the TNA World Championship at Battleground; Joe Hendry appears out of nowhere (2025); The Hardy Boyz (Jeff Hardy and Matt Hardy) win the NXT Tag Team Championship at NXT vs. TNA Showdown
**Match of the Year**: **Oba Femi (c) vs. Je'Von Evans vs. Trick Williams in a Triple threat match for the NXT Championship at Stand & Deliver**; Kelani Jordan vs. Kendal Grey vs. Jordynne Grace vs. Lola Vice vs. Sol Ruca in the Women's Iron Survivor Challenge at Deadline; Oba Femi (c) vs. Je'Von Evans for the NXT Championship at Heatwave; Ethan Page (c) vs. Ricky Saints in a Falls Count Anywhere match for the NXT North American Championship at The Great American Bash; Sol Ruca (c) vs. Kelani Jordan for the NXT Women's North American Championship at Battleground; Jacy Jayne (c) vs. Lola Vice for the NXT Women's Championship at No Mercy	**Best PLE/Show of The Year**: **Stand & Deliver**; New Year's Evil; Vengeance Day; Roadblock; Battleground; The Great American Bash; Heatwave; Homecoming; No Mercy; NXT vs. TNA Showdown; Halloween Havoc; Gold Rush; Deadline

== See also ==
- List of professional wrestling awards
