= Spring Breakin' (2024) =

WWE two-part television special

NXT Spring Breakin'
- Promotion: WWE
- Brand: NXT
- Date: April 23 and April 30, 2024
- City: Orlando, Florida
- Venue: WWE Performance Center

NXT special episodes chronology
← Previous; Roadblock	Next → The Great American Bash

Spring Breakin' chronology
← Previous; 2023	Next → Final

The 2024 Spring Breakin' was a professional wrestling television special produced by WWE for its developmental brand NXT. It was the third annual Spring Breakin' for the brand and aired as a two-part special episode of NXT on the USA Network. The event took place on April 23 and April 30, 2024, at the WWE Performance Center in Orlando, Florida.

Ten matches were contested on Week 1 of the event, including six televised matches and four taped for future episodes of NXT Level Up. In the televised main event, Trick Williams defeated Ilja Dragunov to win the NXT Championship in a match where if Williams lost, he would have had to leave NXT. In another prominent match, Roxanne Perez defeated Lyra Valkyria and Tatum Paxley in a triple threat match to retain the NXT Women's Championship in the opening bout. Week 1 was also notable for being the last NXT event to feature Baron Corbin, Blair Davenport, Ilja Dragunov, and Lyra Valkyria as they would all be called up to the main roster in the 2024 WWE Draft.

Ten matches were contested on Week 2 of the event, including four taped for future episodes of NXT Level Up. In the televised main event, Lola Vice defeated Raw's Natalya in the first ever women's NXT Underground match. In other prominent matches, Axiom and Nathan Frazer defeated SmackDown's Authors of Pain (Akam and Rezar) to retain the NXT Tag Team Championship and, in the opening bout, Oba Femi defeated Raw's Ivar to retain the NXT North American Championship. Week 2 also notably featured the return of Wes Lee, who had been sidelined with a back injury since December 2023.

== Production ==
=== Background ===
Spring Breakin' is an annual professional wrestling television special produced by WWE for its developmental brand NXT. The event was established in 2022 and airs as a special episode of NXT. On April 9, 2024, it was announced that the third Spring Breakin' would take place on April 23 and 30, 2024, at NXT's home base of the WWE Performance Center in Orlando, Florida, expanding the event to a two-part special on the USA Network.

=== Storylines ===
The card included matches that resulted from scripted storylines. Results were predetermined by WWE's writers on the NXT brand, while storylines were produced on WWE's weekly television program, NXT, and the supplementary online streaming show, Level Up.

At Vengeance Day on February 4, Trick Williams, who was accompanied by Carmelo Hayes, failed to win the NXT Championship from Ilja Dragunov. After the match, Hayes attacked Williams with a steel chair, ending their partnership and turning heel in the process. At Roadblock, The D'Angelo Family's Tony D'Angelo defeated Hayes to become the #1 contender to the NXT Championship at Stand & Deliver. After the match, Williams made his return and attacked Hayes in the ring. The following week on NXT, Williams challenged Hayes to a match at Stand & Deliver. At Stand & Deliver on April 6, Dragunov successfully defended his title while Williams defeated Hayes. On the following episode of NXT, Williams called out Dragunov to challenge him for the NXT Championship. Dragunov agreed to a title match at Week 1 of Spring Breakin' on the condition that Williams leave NXT if he lose, which Williams accepted.

In December 2023, Tatum Paxley developed a deranged obsession with then-NXT Women's Champion, Lyra Valkyria. Over the next few months, Tatum interfered in Valkyria's matches, even helping Valkyria retain the title at Vengeance Day in a triple threat match also involving Roxanne Perez. At Stand & Deliver on April 6, Perez defeated Valkyria to win the title despite interference from Paxley. On the following episode of NXT, Valkyria confronted Perez and demanded a rematch later that night, only for Paxley to toss her into the steel steps, ending their partnership and turning Paxley heel in the process. On the April 16 episode in a cinematic vignette, Paxley said that she wanted to be close to Valkyria and that she was being a good girl by helping Valkyria remain champion, but after losing her title, Valkyria meant nothing to Paxley, who expressed her desire to become champion. After Paxley's match with Thea Hail, Valkyria attacked Paxley. In a backstage segment later that night, NXT General Manager Ava announced that Perez will defend her title against Valkyria and Paxley in a triple threat match at Week 1 of Spring Breakin'.

In early 2023, an unidentified person was behind the attacks that left several members of the women's division on the shelf. One of the victims of the attacks was Sol Ruca, and footage of the attack was shown at Spring Breakin' 2023 on the April 25 episode of NXT. On the May 30 episode, the attacker was revealed to be Blair Davenport. At Roadblock on March 5, 2024, after an 11-month hiatus, Ruca returned from injury and attacked Davenport, costing her a match against Fallon Henley. One month later on the April 2 episode of NXT, Ruca defeated Davenport in a singles match. Two weeks later, Davenport knocked Ruca off the top rope, costing her a match against Lola Vice. Later that night backstage, Ruca demanded NXT General Manager Ava to schedule a No Disqualification match against Davenport at Week 1 of Spring Breakin'. Ava accepted the demand, and scheduled the match as a Beach Brawl.

On the April 9 episode of NXT, members of No Quarter Catch Crew (NQCC; Charlie Dempsey, Damon Kemp, and Myles Borne) were challenged by members of The D'Angelo Family (Channing "Stacks" Lorenzo, Luca Crusifino, and Adriana Rizzo) to a tag team match, where The D'Angelo Family (Lorenzo and Crusifino) defeated NQCC (Kemp and Borne). The following week, The D'Angelo Family leader Tony D'Angelo revealed that they were hired by NQCC to (kayfabe) eliminate fellow member Drew Gulak. (Note: In reality, Gulak was written off following allegations from Ronda Rousey that Gulak grabbed her pants' drawstrings backstage in 2022.) D'Angelo demanded payment from NQCC for the job and insinuated that the NQCC's NXT Heritage Cup be given as payment. Dempsey vehemently refused which led to the two teams brawling. A six-man tag team match between The D'Angelo Family and NQCC was then scheduled for Week 1 of Spring Breakin'.

On the March 26 episode of NXT, Lola Vice issued an open challenge, which was answered by Raw's Natalya, who defeated Vice. Two weeks later, Vice attacked Natalya, costing her the NXT Women's Championship. Later that night, Natalya retaliated and attacked Vice backstage. One week later, Natalya challenged Vice to the first-ever women's NXT Underground match, which was scheduled for Week 2 of Spring Breakin'.

On the April 9 episode of NXT, NXT North American Champion Oba Femi celebrated his successful title defense against Josh Briggs and Dijak in a triple threat match at Stand & Deliver and claimed that he will remain champion for a long time. Raw's Ivar of The Viking Raiders appeared and challenged Femi for the title, which was made official for Week 2 of Spring Breakin'.

On the August 15, 2023 episode of NXT, Jacy Jayne defeated Chase University's Thea Hail. Backstage after the match, Jayne gave praise to Hail and subsequently became a mentor to Hail, turning face for the first time since 2021, with Jayne eventually joining Chase University. Around January 2024, Jayne took on a new protégé, Jazmyn Nyx, who would help Jayne win matches by cheating which Hail refused to do. On the March 12, 2024 episode of NXT, Hail disavowed her friendship with Jayne, and Jayne (with Nyx) turned on Chase University the following week, turning both women heel in the process. At Stand & Deliver, Hail, Fallon Henley and Kelani Jordan defeated Jayne, Kiana James and Izzi Dame in a six-woman tag team match. On the April 16 episode of NXT, Tatum Paxley defeated Hail after interference from Jayne and Nyx. A match between Hail and Jayne was then made official for Week 2 of Spring Breakin'.

In late 2023, Axiom and Nathan Frazer formed a tag team partnership. On the April 2, 2024 episode of NXT, Axiom and Frazer won the NXT Tag Team Championship Eliminator Tournament to face NXT Tag Team Champions Baron Corbin and Bron Breakker for the titles at Stand & Deliver but failed to win the match. In a rematch on the following episode of NXT, Axiom and Frazer defeated Corbin and Breakker to become the new NXT Tag Team Champions. After the match, SmackDown's Authors of Pain of The Final Testament appeared and attacked Axiom and Frazer. A title match was then made official for Week 2 of Spring Breakin'.

== Results ==
Week 1 (April 23)
No.	Results	Stipulations	Times
1	Jakara Jackson (with Noam Dar, Oro Mensah, and Lash Legend) defeated Arianna Grace by pinfall	Singles match (Note: This match was taped for the April 26, 2024 episode of NXT Level Up.)	5:44
2	Eddy Thorpe defeated Kale Dixon by disqualification	Singles match (Note: This match was taped for the May 3, 2024 episode of NXT Level Up.)	6:03
3	Kelani Jordan defeated Kendal Grey (with Carlee Bright) by pinfall	Singles match (Note: This match was taped for the May 3, 2024, episode of NXT Level Up.)	5:13
4	Edris Enofé and Malik Blade (with Brinley Reece) defeated Dante Chen and Dion Lennox by pinfall	Tag team match (Note: This match was taped for the April 26, 2024 episode of NXT Level Up.)	5:22
5	Roxanne Perez (c) defeated Lyra Valkyria and Tatum Paxley by pinfall	Triple threat match for the NXT Women's Championship	12:08
6	The D'Angelo Family (Tony D'Angelo, Channing "Stacks" Lorenzo, and Luca Crusifino) (with Adriana Rizzo) defeated No Quarter Catch Crew (Charlie Dempsey, Damon Kemp, and Myles Borne) by pinfall	Six-man tag team match	11:05
7	Jaida Parker (with Scrypts, Bronco Nima, and Lucien Price) defeated Fallon Henley by pinfall	Singles match	6:30
8	Sol Ruca defeated Blair Davenport by pinfall	Beach Brawl	10:29
9	Lexis King defeated Baron Corbin by pinfall	Singles match	5:38
10	Trick Williams defeated Ilja Dragunov (c) by pinfall	Singles match for the NXT Championship; Had Williams lost, he would've been forced to leave NXT.	11:56
(c) / – the champion(s) heading into the match

Week 2 (April 30)
No.	Results	Stipulations	Times
1	Wendy Choo defeated Wren Sinclair by pinfall	Singles match (Note: This match was taped for the May 10, 2024 episode of NXT Level Up.)	4:45
2	Josh Briggs defeated Cutler James by pinfall	Singles match (Note: This match was taped for that May 10, 2024 episode of NXT Level Up.)	4:25
3	The D’Angelo Family (Channing "Stacks" Lorenzo and Luca Crusifino) (with Adriana Rizzo) defeated Dante Chen and Dion Lennox by pinfall	Tag team match (Note: This match was taped for the May 10, 2024 episode of NXT Level Up.)	5:46
4	Je'Von Evans defeated Riley Osborne by pinfall	Singles match (Note: This match was taped foe the May 3, 2024, episode of NXT Level Up.)	5:54
5	Oba Femi (c) defeated Ivar by pinfall	Singles match for the NXT North American Championship	11:11
6	Thea Hail (with Andre Chase, Duke Hudson, Riley Osborne, and Fallon Henley) defeated Jacy Jayne (with Jazmyn Nyx) by submission	Singles match	7:57
7	The O.C. (Karl Anderson and Luke Gallows) defeated Tyriek Igwe and Tyson Dupont by pinfall	Tag team match	2:15
8	Ridge Holland defeated Shawn Spears by pinfall	Singles match	7:35
9	Axiom and Nathan Frazer (c) defeated Authors of Pain (Akam and Rezar) (with Karrion Kross, Scarlett, and Paul Ellering) by pinfall	Tag team match for the NXT Tag Team Championship	9:35
10	Lola Vice (with Shayna Baszler) defeated Natalya (with Karmen Petrovic) by technical knockout	NXT Underground match	11:51
(c) / – the champion(s) heading into the match
