= Spring Breakin' =

- Promotions: WWE
- Brands: NXT (2022–2024)
- First event: 2022
- Last event: 2024

Spring Breakin' was an annual professional wrestling television special produced by the American promotion WWE as part of their NXT brand division. Since its inception in 2022, it was held annually as a television special of NXT, until its discontinuation in 2025. The event's name was a reference to it being held in the spring as all events have been held in either April or May.

== History ==
The inaugural Spring Breakin' event was held as a special episode of NXT, on May 3, 2022 and took place at NXT's home base of the WWE Performance Center in Orlando, Florida. A second Spring Breakin' was confirmed for the following year, establishing Spring Breakin' as an annual Spring event for NXT. On the April 9, 2024 episode of NXT, it was announced that the third Spring Breakin' would take place on April 23 and 30, 2024, this time expanded to a two-part special.

== Events ==
#	Event	Date	City	Venue	Main event	Ref.
1	Spring Breakin' (2022)	May 3, 2022	Orlando, Florida	WWE Performance Center	Bron Breakker (c) vs. Joe Gacy for the NXT Championship	
2	Spring Breakin' (2023)	April 25, 2023	Orlando, Florida	WWE Performance Center	Indi Hartwell (c) vs. Roxanne Perez vs. Tiffany Stratton for the NXT Women's Championship	
3	Spring Breakin' (2024)	April 23, 2024	Orlando, Florida	WWE Performance Center	Ilja Dragunov (c) vs. Trick Williams for the NXT Championship	
3	Spring Breakin' (2024)	April 30, 2024	Orlando, Florida	WWE Performance Center	Lola Vice vs. Natalya in an NXT Underground match	
(c) – refers to the champion(s) heading into the match
