= Spring Breakin' (2023) =

WWE television special

NXT Spring Breakin'
- Promotional poster featuring various WWE wrestlers
- Promotion: WWE
- Brand: NXT
- Date: April 25, 2023
- City: Orlando, Florida
- Venue: WWE Performance Center

NXT special episodes chronology
← Previous; Roadblock	Next → Gold Rush

Spring Breakin' chronology
← Previous; 2022	Next → 2024

The 2023 Spring Breakin' was the second annual Spring Breakin' professional wrestling event produced by WWE. It was held primarily for wrestlers from the NXT brand division. Spring Breakin' aired as a special episode of NXT. The television special took place on April 25, 2023, at the WWE Performance Center in Orlando, Florida and aired on the USA Network.

Seven matches were contested at the event. In the main event, Indi Hartwell defeated Roxanne Perez and Tiffany Stratton in a triple threat match to retain the NXT Women's Championship.

== Production ==
=== Background ===
Spring Breakin' is an annual professional wrestling television special produced by WWE. The inaugural Spring Breakin' event was held as a special episode of NXT, on May 3 and took place at NXT's home base of the WWE Performance Center in Orlando, Florida. On the April 11, 2023, episode of NXT, it was announced that the second Spring Breakin' would take place on April 25, 2023, thereby establishing Spring Breakin' as an annual Spring event for NXT.

=== Storylines ===
The card included matches that resulted from scripted storylines, where wrestlers portrayed heroes, villains, or less distinguishable characters in scripted events that built tension and culminated in a wrestling match or series of matches. Results were predetermined by WWE's writers on the NXT brand, while storylines were produced on WWE's weekly television program, NXT, and the supplementary online streaming show, Level Up.

On the April 11 episode of NXT, Grayson Waller won a fatal four-way match to become the number one contender for Carmelo Hayes' NXT Championship at Spring Breakin'.

On the April 11 episode of NXT, while Chase University (Andre Chase, Duke Hudson, and Thea Hail) were presenting an MVP award for Hudson, they were confronted by Bron Breakker, who laid them out. The following week, Hudson challenged Breakker to face Chase at Spring Breakin', which was made official.

Starting on the April 4 episode of NXT, video packages aired that hyped the NXT debut of a new wrestler named Oba Femi. On the April 18 episode, it was announced that Femi would make his NXT debut at Spring Breakin'.

On the April 4 episode of NXT, Pretty Deadly (Kit Wilson and Elton Prince) defeated Tony D'Angelo and Channing "Stacks" Lorenzo when Wilson and Prince switched places, allowing Prince to send D'Angelo into an exposed turnbuckle. The following week, an NXT Anonymous video showed D'Angelo and Lorenzo attacking Pretty Deadly in the parking lot, with Wilson being kidnapped in the trunk of a car. On the April 18 episode, Pretty Deadly challenged D'Angelo and Lorenzo to a match at Spring Breakin', which was made official as a trunk match.

At Stand & Deliver, Roxanne Perez lost the NXT Women's Championship to Indi Hartwell in a ladder match. On the April 18 episode, after Perez won her match, Hartwell interrupted. Hartwell stated that the reason she was still the champion was because of Perez, and gave her a title match at Spring Breakin'. Tiffany Stratton interrupted, making it a triple threat match.

On the April 11 episode of NXT, Fallon Henley and Kiana James (with Josh Briggs and Brooks Jensen) failed to win the NXT Women's Tag Team Championship after Jensen was ejected from ringside. The following week, James and Briggs argued backstage, and Briggs stated that he ended his friendship with Jensen. Later that night, James and Jensen challenged Henley and Briggs to a mixed tag team match, which was made official for Spring Breakin'.

On the April 4 episode of NXT, following Cora Jade's return, she was confronted by Lyra Valkyria backstage. The following week, Jade cut a promo about shifting her focus to the NXT Women's Championship, but was confronted by Valkyria. Valkyria then attacked Jade, who was able to retreat. On the April 18 episode, after Jade won her match, Valkyria confronted Jade and stated that they would face each other at Spring Breakin'.

== Event ==
=== Preliminary matches ===
The television special began with Pretty Deadly (Kit Wilson and Elton Prince) taking on Tony D'Angelo and Channing "Stacks" Lorenzo in a trunk match, where the only way to win is to put both members of a team into a car trunk. In the closing moments, Pretty Deadly performed Spilt Milk on Lorenzo and put him in the trunk, but as they tried to do the same to D'Angelo, Lorenzo sprayed a fire extinguisher on Pretty Deadly. Afterwards, D'Angelo struck Wilson with a crowbar to put him in the trunk. D'Angelo and Lorenzo then sent Prince through a table with a spinebuster before putting him in the trunk to win the match.

Next, Andre Chase (accompanied by Duke Hudson) took on Bron Breakker. Chase managed to dominate Breakker throughout the match, but the turning point came when Breakker broke up the Chase U boots at the "H". Breakker then performed a Powerslam on Chase and forced him to submit to the Steiner Recliner to win the match.

Following this, Ilja Dragunov entered a parking garage, but was attacked from behind by Dijak, who sent Dragunov into the production tools before slamming the garage door on him.

In the third match, Cora Jade took on Lyra Valkyria. In the closing moments, the referee prevented Jade from using a kendo stick, but Jade used the referee to block Valkyria's crescent kick. Jade followed up with a DDT on Valkyria to win the match.

After that, Carmelo Hayes (accompanied by Trick Williams) defended the NXT Championship against Grayson Waller. During the match, Waller introduced a chair, which the referee tossed out, allowing Waller to strike Williams with another chair. Waller and Hayes were able to prevent the others' finishing moves, and Waller performed a crescent kick and a Sitout Powerbomb for a nearfall. Waller performed the Ace Crusher on Hayes, who rolled out of the ring to avoid the pinfall. Afterwards, Waller sent Hayes through the announce table. Back in the ring, Hayes was able to kick out. In the climax, Waller attempted the Ace Crusher again, but messed up the roll, allowing Hayes to perform a kick and the Nothing But Net on Waller to retain the title. After the match, Hayes challenged Bron Breakker to a title match at Battleground, only for Breakker to attack Hayes and Williams from behind, ending the attack with Breakker spearing Hayes through a barricade.

Following this, while Joe Coffey was on the phone with Mark Coffey, Joe Gacy and Ava interrupted. Ava asked for an NXT Tag Team Championship match pitting The Dyad (Jagger Reid and Rip Fowler) against champions Gallus (Joe, Mark, and Wolfgang). Gacy then challenged Joe to a match where if Gacy won, The Dyad would get a title match, but if Joe won, The Dyad would not get a title match as long as Gallus were the champions. The match was subsequently scheduled for the following week.

In the fifth match, Josh Briggs and Fallon Henley took on Brooks Jensen and Kiana James in a mixed tag team match. In the closing moments, James handed Jensen a designer bag, but Briggs moved out of the way of the bag shot. Jensen accidentally knocked James off the ring apron, allowing Briggs to perform a clothesline on Jensen to win the match. Following the match, James stated that she never loved Jensen and left. Jensen and Briggs then hugged it out.

Next, Dragon Lee was being interviewed backstage, and set his sights on Noam Dar and the NXT Heritage Cup.

In the penultimate match, Oba Femi, in his debut match on NXT, took on Oro Mensah. In the end, Femi performed a Powerbomb on Mensah to win the match.

Immediately after the match, Gigi Dolin took the headset from commentator Vic Joseph and called out Jacy Jayne for abandoning her family. Dolin promised to defeat Jayne with Dolin's family at ringside the following week.

Before the main event, Charlie Dempsey and Drew Gulak were being interviewed backstage about how wins and losses mattered. Gulak stated that he would defeat Wes Lee for the NXT North American Championship the following week.

=== Main event ===
In the main event, Indi Hartwell defended the NXT Women's Championship against Tiffany Stratton and Roxanne Perez in a triple threat match. During the match, Stratton performed a Swanton Bomb on Perez and Hartwell, with the latter being checked at by referees. In the climax, Hartwell returned and performed a spinebuster on Stratton for a nearfall. Stratton then performed a bodyslam and followed up with a moonsault on Perez, but Hartwell broke up the pin and performed a basement forearm on Perez to retain the title.

Finally, Tony D'Angelo and Channing "Stacks" Lorenzo dumped Pretty Deadly (Kit Wilson and Elton Prince) into a lake. D'Angelo and Lorenzo stated that they would be setting their sights at the NXT Tag Team Championship. They then drove off to celebrate as the show ended.

== Aftermath ==
The 2023 Spring Breakin' was the final episode of NXT before the 2023 WWE Draft. As a result, the event marked the final NXT appearance for Pretty Deadly (Kit Wilson and Elton Prince) and Grayson Waller, as they were drafted to SmackDown. Also, NXT Women's Champion Indi Hartwell was drafted to Raw; on the following episode of NXT, Hartwell vacated the title, and announced that a tournament to crown a new champion would begin the following week and end at Battleground.

Wes Lee (accompanied by Tyler Bate) and Drew Gulak (with Charlie Dempsey) had their NXT North American Championship match on the following episode of NXT, where Lee retained after Bate took out Dempsey. Bate also began setting his sights at the title.

Also on NXT, Trick Williams talked about the situation of NXT Champion Carmelo Hayes when Bron Breakker interrupted. Breakker stated that the damage he caused to Hayes and Williams made his title match against Hayes at Battleground easier, and Breakker and Williams agreed to a match the following week.

Gigi Dolin and Jacy Jayne also had their match, where Jayne was victorious this time; during the match, Jayne was bleeding heavily.

Josh Briggs, Brooks Jensen, and Fallon Henley chatted at Henley's bar, and Jensen stated that he learned some business sense from Kiana James. Two people wanted to have a drink with them, which Jensen declined, and his friends acknowledged his growth.

NXT Heritage Cup champion Noam Dar cost Dragon Lee his match against JD McDonagh (who was also drafted to Raw during the 2023 WWE Draft, and was his final NXT appearance). After the match, Lee chased Dar off.

Joe Gacy and Joe Coffey had their singles match, with their respective stablemates in their corners. Thanks to interference from Schism (Ava, Jagger Reid, and Rip Fowler), Gacy was victorious.

== Results ==
No.	Results	Stipulations	Times
1	The Family (Tony D'Angelo and Channing "Stacks" Lorenzo) defeated Pretty Deadly (Elton Prince and Kit Wilson)	Trunk match	12:31
2	Bron Breakker defeated Andre Chase (with Duke Hudson) by submission	Singles match	2:19
3	Cora Jade defeated Lyra Valkyria by pinfall	Singles match	8:19
4	Carmelo Hayes (c) (with Trick Williams) defeated Grayson Waller by pinfall	Singles match for the NXT Championship	12:03
5	Josh Briggs and Fallon Henley defeated Brooks Jensen and Kiana James by pinfall	Mixed tag team match	11:43
6	Oba Femi defeated Oro Mensah by pinfall	Singles match	3:35
7	Indi Hartwell (c) defeated Roxanne Perez and Tiffany Stratton by pinfall	Triple threat match for the NXT Women's Championship	15:12
(c) / – the champion(s) heading into the match
