= WWE Performance Center =

International professional wrestling school

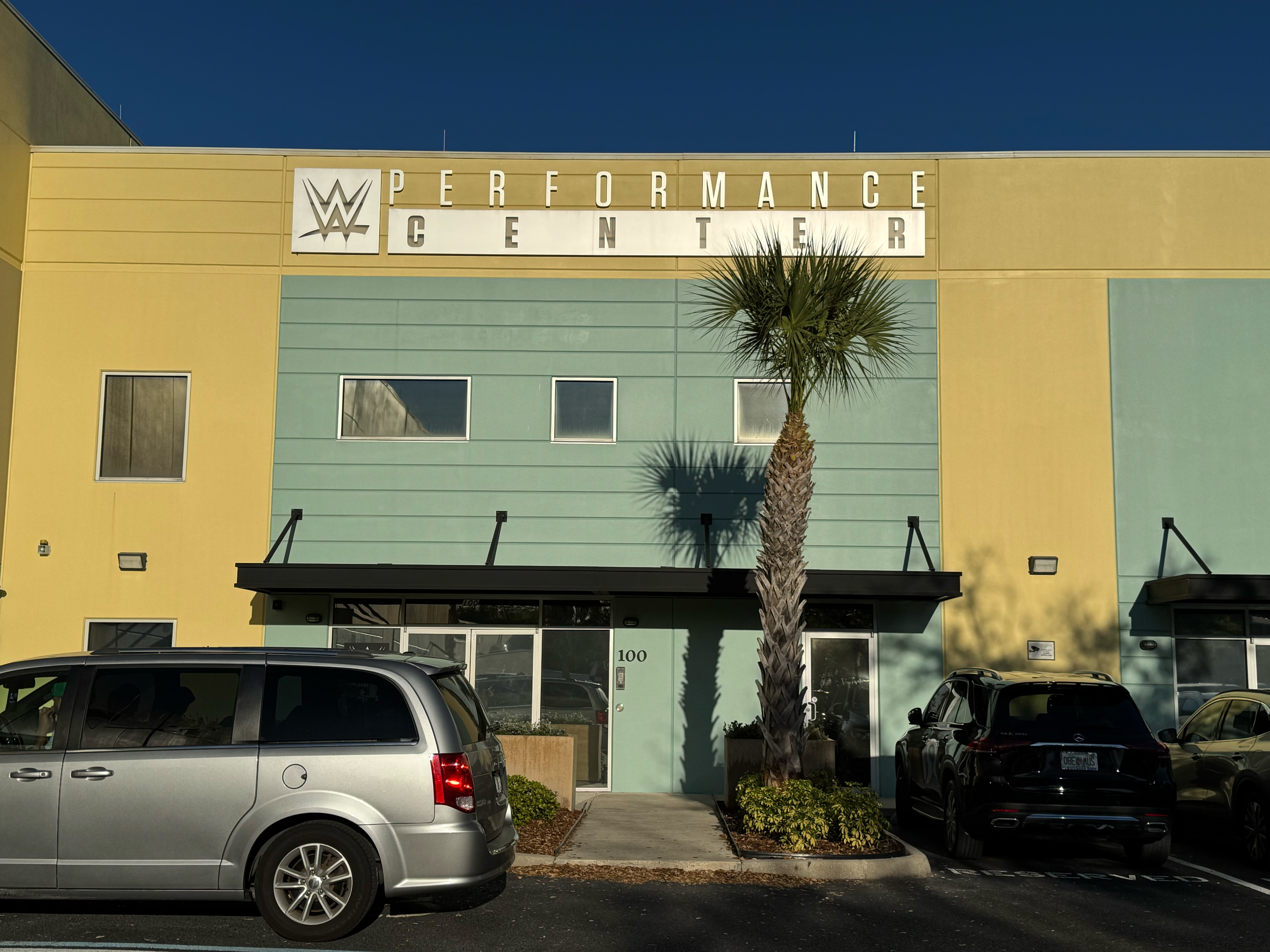
- The Performance Center in 2025
- Predecessor: Florida Championship Wrestling
- Founded: July 11, 2013; 13 years ago
- Headquarters: 5055 Forsyth Commerce Road, Suite 100, Orlando, Florida, US; Unit 30–31, Great Cambridge Industrial Estate, Lincoln Road, Enfield, London, England, UK
- Key people: Paul "Triple H" Levesque (Chief Content Officer); Shawn Michaels (SVP of Talent Development Creative); Matt Bloom (VP of Talent Development, Head Coach); Sara Amato (Assistant Head Coach); AJ Styles, Robbie Brookside, Steve Corino, Fit Finlay, Lince Dorado, Johnny Moss, Norman Smiley, Terry Taylor, Oney Lorcan, Jazz (Coaches)
- Owner: TKO Group Holdings (Endeavor)
- Parent: WWE
- Website: Official website

The WWE Performance Center (WWE PC) is a group of professional wrestling schools owned by American company WWE. They serve as tryout and training facilities for WWE, and also contain sports science and medical facilities as well as live events and production studios. WWE currently operates two Performance Center locations, with the first opened in Orlando, Florida, on July 11, 2013, replacing the training facility of WWE's former developmental territory Florida Championship Wrestling. A second branch opened on January 11, 2019, in Enfield, London.

The Performance Center in Orlando temporarily became the home venue for WWE's Raw, SmackDown, and 205 Live brands in March 2020 due to the COVID-19 pandemic, with its weekly television programs Monday Night Raw, Friday Night SmackDown, 205 Live, and Main Event, as well as pay-per-view events (including WrestleMania 36) being taped in a studio hall at the Performance Center with no audience. In August 2020, WWE moved Raw and SmackDown's closed productions to an arena setting dubbed the "ThunderDome" — which used a larger-scale production more in line with its touring shows, but with a virtual audience.

The NXT developmental brand was subsequently moved to the Performance Center in Orlando in October 2020, moving from its former home at Full Sail University. Following the move of the NXT program to the Performance Center, the school's main studio was reconfigured as the "Capitol Wrestling Center" (CWC) to suit the look and feel of NXT programming. Unlike the tenures of the Raw and SmackDown brands at the Performance Center, NXT's move was permanent, with the brand remaining at the Performance Center even as COVID-19 restrictions were lifted in June 2021. The CWC name was dropped in September 2021 as part of a relaunch of NXT, which saw a second reconfiguration of the studio.

In 2025, the Performance Center in Orlando became the home venue for television tapings of WWE's LFG and Evolve programs.

== History ==
=== Use as training facilities ===
The Orlando facility covers 26,000 square feet (2,400 m^{2}) and includes seven training rings (including a special padded ring for high-flying moves), a strength and conditioning program, and editing and production facilities including an ultra-slow camera and a voice-over room that performers and on-air announcers can use to practice. The facility was opened in 2013 and replaced the training center at WWE's former developmental territory, Florida Championship Wrestling, which was based in Tampa and had been serving as WWE's developmental headquarters since 2008.

The WWE Performance Center trains around 65 to 70 wrestlers at any one time. Trainees have a variety of experience levels, from beginners with non-wrestling backgrounds to experienced wrestlers from the independent circuit. Wrestlers train to improve their in-ring performance, strength and conditioning, as well as working on their characters and personality. Aspiring referees, ring announcers, commentators, and backstage interviewers also train at the Performance Center. The trainees train full-time, while also performing at NXT house shows and appearing on the WWE NXT television program. In addition, established WWE main roster performers often use the facility for training and injury rehab, while mentoring new trainees.

The Performance Center uses former wrestlers as trainers. The inaugural head trainer was Bill DeMott, who departed the company in 2015 and was replaced by Matt Bloom. Other trainers have included Sara Amato, Robbie Brookside, Norman Smiley, Adam Pearce, Ace Steel, Scotty 2 Hotty, and Sarah Stock. Dusty Rhodes was responsible for developing the trainees' microphone skills and wrestling personas until his death in 2015. The Performance Center occasionally invites guest trainers, notably Mike Quackenbush, Kevin Nash, and Scott Hall.

In addition to training contracted performers, the Performance Center is also regularly used for tryouts which operate on an invite-only basis and include athletes from a wide variety of backgrounds, including established domestic and international professional wrestlers, amateur wrestlers, NFL and NCAA football players, and individuals from a range of other sporting and non-sporting backgrounds.

A second Britain-based Performance Center opened in Enfield, London, England on January 11, 2019. In April 2019, WWE announced plans to open additional Performance Centers in India and China.

=== Use as a home arena ===
==== Use during the COVID-19 pandemic ====
Prior to the COVID-19 pandemic, WWE hosted their Halftime Heat event on February 3, 2019 at the Performance Center in Orlando. A year later on March 12, 2020, WWE announced that due to the COVID-19 pandemic (which resulted in the suspension of many professional sports leagues), live episodes of Raw and SmackDown would air from the Performance Center without an audience until further notice, beginning with the following day's episode of SmackDown. The company had begun filming episodes of NXT without an audience at Full Sail University the previous day, although the March 11 episode was filmed at the Performance Center and was the last show produced with a live paying audience. On March 16, it was announced that WrestleMania 36, set to take place on April 5 and previously scheduled for Raymond James Stadium in Tampa, Florida, would instead be moved to the Performance Center, again without an audience and would expand to two nights taking place on Saturday April 4 and Sunday April 5. The two night format would later be adopted for all subsequent WrestleMania events.

The Performance Center continued to host episodes of Raw, SmackDown, Main Event, as well as the pay-per-views Money in the Bank (which was also held at Titan Towers in Stamford, Connecticut), Backlash, and The Horror Show at Extreme Rules, before the shows and pay-per-views moved to the new, larger-scale "ThunderDome" staging (under similar restrictions, but with a virtual audience on ribbon displays) at Orlando's Amway Center, beginning with the August 21 SmackDown and that weekend's SummerSlam. In December, the ThunderDome relocated to Tropicana Field in St. Petersburg, Florida before moving to Yuengling Center in Tampa in April 2021, and being discontinued entirely in July 2021 with the resumption of touring shows.

==== NXT moves to the Performance Center ====
In October 2020, beginning with NXT TakeOver 31, NXT and 205 Live moved to the Performance Center (from Full Sail University and the ThunderDome at Amway Center, respectively, as the 205 Live brand was being subsumed by NXT), using a reconfigured version of the facility's main arena branded as the "Capitol Wrestling Center"—an homage to WWE's precursor, the Capitol Wrestling Corporation. It was designed to reflect the look and feel of NXT programming, with a virtual audience similar to the WWE ThunderDome on an LED screen in the studio, and areas for limited outside spectators divided by plexiglass walls decorated with chain-link fencing.

For TakeOver: Stand & Deliver in April 2021, the plexiglass wall dividers were removed and live audience capacity was increased. TakeOver: In Your House in June lifted almost all COVID-19 protocols, expanding its seating capacity to around 300, and removing mask requirements and the virtual audience. While Raw and SmackDown resumed a live touring schedule in mid-July, NXT's move to the Performance Center was permanent. On September 14, 2021, the venue received a new set design as part of the "NXT 2.0" relaunch; the Capitol Wrestling Center name was dropped at this time. The venue later became the host of WWE's other developmental programs, NXT Level Up, LFG, and Evolve.

=== 2015 shooting incident ===
In August 2015, Orange County Sheriff's Office deputies shot 29-year-old Armando Alejandro Montalvo outside the Performance Center in Orlando after he threatened them and ignored commands. Montalvo was "obsessed" with female wrestler AJ Lee and made numerous attempts to trespass through the facility, despite an injunction against him by WWE. Days after the shooting, Montalvo claimed he was bipolar when he was questioned by detectives. He faced trial in February 2016 on charges of aggravated assault, resisting an officer with violence, and trespassing. A public defender representing Montalvo has entered a written plea of not guilty on his behalf.

On April 19, 2018, WWE filed an emergency restraining order against Montalvo after he returned to the Performance Center the previous month and harassed the employees. In addition, Montalvo posted a threatening message to WWE wrestlers and staff on his Instagram account. On May 7, 2018, Montalvo was arrested for missing his court date with WWE.

== Locations ==
=== United States ===
The first WWE Performance Center facility was opened on July 11, 2013. The Performance Center replaced the training center of WWE's former developmental territory, Florida Championship Wrestling (FCW), which was based in Tampa and had been serving as WWE's developmental headquarters since 2008.

==== Wrestlers trained ====
===== 2013 =====
Names	Notes
Alexis Kaufman	Currently competes as Alexa Bliss on the SmackDown brand.
Charles Betts	Currently competes as Chad Gable on the Raw brand.
Gary Gordon	Currently competes as Angelo Dawkins on the Raw brand.
Pamela Martinez	Currently competes as Bayley on the Raw brand.

===== 2014 =====
Names	Notes
Gionna Daddio	Currently competes as Liv Morgan on the Raw brand.
Savelina Fanene	Currently competes as Nia Jax on the SmackDown brand.

===== 2015 =====
Names	Notes
Christopher Girard	Competed as Oney Lorcan on the NXT brand. Currently works as a trainer on the Performance Center since 2022.
Kenneth Crawford	Currently competes as Montez Ford on the Raw brand.

===== 2016 =====
Names	Notes
Bianca Blair	Currently competes as Bianca Belair on the SmackDown brand.
Nikola Bogojevic	Currently competes as Otis on the Raw brand.
Victoria Gonzalez	Currently competes as Raquel Rodriguez on the Raw brand.

===== 2017 =====
Names	Notes
Candice LeRae Dawson	Cuurently competes as Candice LeRae on the SmackDown brand.
Demi Bennett	Currently competes as Rhea Ripley on the SmackDown brand.

===== 2019 =====
Names	Notes
Briana Brandy	Currently competes as B-Fab on the SmackDown brand.
Dominik Óscar Gutiérrez	Currently competes as Dominik Mysterio on the Raw brand.

===== 2020 =====
Names	Notes
Anriel Howard	Currently competes as Lash Legend on the SmackDown brand.
Emily Andzulis	Currently competes as Ivy Nile on the Raw brand.
Jacob Kasper	Competed as Julius Creed on the Raw brand. Left WWE in 2026.

===== 2021 =====
Names	Notes
Jessica Woynilko	Currently competes as Tiffany Stratton on the SmackDown brand.
Bronson Rechsteiner	Currently competes as Bron Breakker on the Raw brand.
Drew Kasper	Competed as Brutus Creed on the Raw brand. Left WWE in 2026.
Joseph Ariola	Currently competes as Tony D'Angelo on the NXT brand.
Natalie Holland	Competes as Tatum Paxley on the SmackDown brand.
Logan Paul	Currently competes on the Raw brand.

===== 2022 =====
Names	Notes
Tiana Lillian Marie Caffey	Currently competes as Jaida Parker on the NXT brand.
Sydney Jeannine Zmrzel	Currently competes as Maxxine Dupri on the Raw brand.
Tracy Hancock	Currently training as Tavion Heights on the NXT brand.
Franki Carissa Strefling	Currently competes as Izzi Dame on the NXT brand.
Calyx Harmony Hampton	Currently competes as Sol Ruca on the Raw brand.
David Bostian III	Currently competes as Myles Borne on the NXT brand.
Monika Klisara	Currently competes as Karmen Petrovic on the NXT and Evolve brands.

===== 2023 =====
Names	Notes
Anna Keefer	Competed as Adriana Rizzo on the NXT brand. Released from WWE in 2026.
Jade Cargill	Currently competes on the SmackDown brand.
Peyton Prussin	Currently competes as Kendal Grey on the NXT brand.
Lea Mitchell	Currently competes as Kelani Jordan on the NXT brand.
Valerie Loureda	Currently competes as Lola Vice on the Raw brand.

===== 2024 =====
Names	Notes
Thunder Justice Keck	Currently training as Shiloh Hill for the NXT brand.
Skylor Clinton	Competed as Niko Vance on the NXT brand.

=== United Kingdom ===
The British branch is located at the Great Cambridge Industrial Estate in Enfield, London, England, and was opened on January 11, 2019. The center, which served as the headquarters of WWE's NXT UK brand, is 17,000 square feet and includes 2 rings.

==== Wrestlers trained ====
===== 2019 =====
Names	Notes
Marie Gabert	Competed as Jazzy Gabert on NXT UK. Released from WWE in 2020.

===== 2020 =====
Names	Notes
Amy Samardzija	Competed as Candy Floss on the NXT UK brand. Released from WWE in 2021.

== Events hosted ==
The following are the events that have been held at the Performance Center in Orlando:

Weekly television shows
Show	Dates
NXT (NXT 2.0 from September 2021 to September 2022)	March 11, 2020; October 4, 2020 – present
SmackDown	March 13, 2020 – August 14, 2020
205 Live	March 13, 2020 – August 14, 2020; October 9, 2020 – February 11, 2022
Raw	March 16, 2020 – August 17, 2020
Main Event	March 16, 2020 – August 17, 2020 (aired March 19, 2020 – August 20, 2020)
NXT Level Up	February 18, 2022 – December 27, 2024
LFG	February 16, 2025 – present
Evolve	March 5, 2025 – present
Television specials
Show	Date
NXT: Halloween Havoc	October 28, 2020
NXT: A Very Gargano Christmas Special	December 23, 2020
2020 NXT Year-End Awards	December 30, 2020
NXT: New Year's Evil	January 6, 2021
NXT's move to Tuesday	April 13, 2021
NXT: The Great American Bash	July 6, 2021
NXT 2.0: Halloween Havoc	October 26, 2021
NXT 2.0: New Year's Evil	January 4, 2022
NXT 2.0: Vengeance Day	February 15, 2022
NXT 2.0: Roadblock	March 8, 2022
NXT 2.0: Spring Breakin'	May 3, 2022
NXT 2.0: The Great American Bash	July 5, 2022
NXT 2.0: Heatwave	August 16, 2022
NXT: New Year's Evil	January 10, 2023
NXT: Roadblock	March 7, 2023
NXT: Spring Breakin'	April 25, 2023
NXT: Gold Rush	June 20 and 27, 2023
NXT: Heatwave	August 22, 2023
NXT: Halloween Havoc	October 24 and 31, 2023
NXT: New Year's Evil	January 2, 2024
NXT: Roadblock	March 5, 2024
NXT: Spring Breakin'	April 23 and 30, 2024
NXT: The Great American Bash	July 30 and August 6, 2024
NXT: ShoWdown	October 7, 2025
NXT: New Year's Evil	January 6, 2026
Premium Live Events
Event	Dates
Halftime Heat	February 3, 2019
WrestleMania 36	March 25–26, 2020 (aired April 4–5, 2020)
Money in the Bank	May 10, 2020
Backlash	June 14, 2020
The Horror Show at Extreme Rules	July 19, 2020
NXT TakeOver 31	October 4, 2020
NXT TakeOver: WarGames	December 6, 2020
NXT TakeOver: Vengeance Day	February 14, 2021
NXT TakeOver: Stand & Deliver	April 7–8, 2021
NXT TakeOver: In Your House	June 13, 2021
NXT TakeOver 36	August 22, 2021
NXT WarGames	December 5, 2021
NXT In Your House	June 4, 2022
Worlds Collide	September 4, 2022
NXT Halloween Havoc	October 22, 2022
NXT Deadline	December 10, 2022
NXT Vengeance Day	March 7, 2026
NXT The Great American Bash	June 28, 2026
NXT Halloween Havoc	October 31, 2026

== See also ==
- Full Sail University
- WCW Power Plant
- UFC Apex
- UFC Performance Institute

Preceded by MetLife Stadium	Host of WrestleMania; 2020 (36)	Succeeded by Raymond James Stadium
