= Spring Breakin' (2022) =

WWE television special

NXT Spring Breakin'
- Promotion: WWE
- Brand: NXT
- Date: May 3, 2022
- City: Orlando, Florida
- Venue: WWE Performance Center

NXT special episodes chronology
← Previous; Roadblock	Next → The Great American Bash

Spring Breakin' chronology
← Previous; First	Next → 2023

The 2022 Spring Breakin' was the inaugural Spring Breakin' professional wrestling event produced by WWE. It was held primarily for wrestlers from the NXT brand division. Spring Breakin' aired as a special episode of NXT. The television special took place on May 3, 2022, at the WWE Performance Center in Orlando, Florida and aired on the USA Network.

Five matches were contested at the event. In the main event, Bron Breakker defeated Joe Gacy to retain the NXT Championship.

== Production ==
=== Background ===
On the April 19, 2022, episode of NXT, it was announced that Spring Breakin' would be held as a special episode of NXT, with the television special airing on May 3 on the USA Network and taking place at NXT's home base of the WWE Performance Center in Orlando, Florida.

=== Storylines ===
The card included matches that resulted from scripted storylines, where wrestlers portrayed heroes, villains, or less distinguishable characters in scripted events that built tension and culminated in a wrestling match or series of matches. Results were predetermined by WWE's writers on the NXT brand, while storylines were produced on WWE's weekly television program, NXT, and the supplementary online streaming show, Level Up.

On the April 5 episode of NXT, following Bron Breakker's successful NXT Championship defense, Breakker's father, Rick Steiner, appeared on the TitanTron to congratulate Breakker on his victory. The camera then zoomed out to see Steiner trapped in a cage by Joe Gacy, who burned Steiner's WWE Hall of Fame ring the following week. Breakker spent the entirety of the April 19 episode searching for Gacy. At the end of the show, Breakker found Gacy on top of an elevated platform. Breakker got his father's Hall of Fame ring back under one condition: Breakker had to defend the NXT Championship against Gacy at Spring Breakin'. Afterwards, Gacy told Breakker to take a leap of faith before pushing him off the concourse. Breakker was surrounded by Gacy's druids as NXT went off the air.

At NXT Stand & Deliver, Carmelo Hayes lost the NXT North American Championship to Cameron Grimes in a five-way ladder match. On the following episode of NXT, while Grimes talked about his title win, he was interrupted by Solo Sikoa, who also competed in the ladder match, setting up a title match between Grimes and Sikoa for the following week, where Grimes retained. Afterwards, Grimes was attacked by Hayes and Trick Williams. On the April 19 episode, after Hayes' match, Hayes stated that he would be taking the title back from Grimes at Spring Breakin'. As Grimes and Hayes stared each other down, Sikoa appeared and attacked Hayes and Williams. Later that night, a triple threat match between Grimes, Hayes, and Sikoa for the title was scheduled for Spring Breakin'.

On the April 12 episode of NXT, SmackDown's Natalya made her return to NXT to seemingly wish a good future for Cora Jade, only to tell her that the future was bleak. She then placed Jade in the sharpshooter and stood tall. The following week, after Natalya's match, Natalya confronted Nikkita Lyons, who had her own rivalry with Lash Legend, stating that after Lyons' match against Legend, Natalya would place her in the Sharpshooter. On the April 26 episode, after Lyons defeated Legend, Natalya and Legend attacked Lyons until Jade made the save. Later that night, a tag team match pitting Lyons and Jade against Natalya and Legend was scheduled for Spring Breakin'.

On the April 12 episode of NXT, The Creed Brothers (Brutus Creed and Julius Creed) eliminated three teams, but were the last team eliminated in a gauntlet match for the vacant NXT Tag Team Championship. Two weeks later, Roderick Strong hyped The Creed Brothers to reverse their fortunes and booked them in a match against SmackDown's The Viking Raiders (Erik and Ivar) at Spring Breakin'.

On the April 26 episode of NXT, Nathan Frazer was scheduled to face Guru Raaj in the former's debut match on NXT, only for Grayson Waller to attack Raaj. Waller then mocked Frazer before turning his attention to the Chase University students in attendance. Frazer then laid out Waller, with Chase U member Andre Chase calling it a "teachable moment". Later that night, Frazer was scheduled to face Waller at Spring Breakin'.

On the April 19 episode of NXT, two hooded men cost Santos Escobar a win. The following week, the men fought with Legado Del Fantasma (Joaquin Wilde and Cruz Del Toro) during Tony D'Angelo's match, allowing Escobar to attack D'Angelo on the outside of the ring, causing him to lose his match. Later that night, the hooded men were revealed to be Channing "Stacks" Lorenzo and Troy "Two Dimes" Donovan. Also, it was announced that D'Angelo and Escobar would have a sit-down meeting at Spring Breakin'.

== Event ==
|Referees (professional wrestling)

=== Preliminary matches ===
The television special began with Cameron Grimes defending the NXT North American Championship against Carmelo Hayes and Solo Sikoa in a triple threat match. Grimes performed a Spanish Fly powerslam on Hayes, followed by Sikoa taking down Grimes and Hayes. Sikoa performed a Hip Smash on Grimes and Hayes in the corner. Grimes performed a Frankensteiner on Hayes and Sikoa, and did the same to Hayes for a nearfall. Hayes countered a Cave In attempt by Grimes into a Codebreaker for a nearfall. In the climax, Sikoa performed a Superkick on Hayes and performed an Uso Splash on Grimes, but Hayes broke up the pin. Sikoa countered a Codebreaker from Hayes, but Grimes performed a Cave In on Sikoa, who in turn performed a Samoan Drop on Hayes. Afterwards, Grimes pinned Hayes to retain the title.

Following this, NXT Women's Champion Mandy Rose was at a tanning salon when Wendy Choo changed the settings on the tanning bed, causing Rose's skin to be burnt. Rose's Toxic Attraction members, NXT Women's Tag Team Champions Gigi Dolin and Jacy Jayne, checked on Rose, who screamed when she looked at herself in the mirror.

In the second match, Nathan Frazer (accompanied by Andre Chase and Bodhi Hayward of Chase University), in his debut match on NXT, took on Grayson Waller. During the match, Waller attempted a Curb Stomp, but Frazer sent Waller out of the ring and followed up with a Suicide Dive. Waller blocked a Phoenix Splash attempt by Frazer and performed a Butterfly Blockbuster on Frazer for a nearfall. In the climax, Waller shoved Frazer off the top rope, but Chase blared an air horn, causing Waller to fall off the top rope. Frazer then performed a Phoenix Splash on Waller to win the match.

Afterwards, footage was shown of the fourth woman presented in the inaugural NXT Women's Breakout Tournament (which began the following week), Fallon Henley.

Next, Santos Escobar and Tony D'Angelo (accompanied by Channing "Stacks" Lorenzo, Troy "Two Dimes" Donovan, and AJ Galante) had a sit-down meeting. After a conversation between the two, they agreed to an uneasy truce. D'Angelo stated that he and his associates would see Legado Del Fantasma (Escobar, Cruz Del Toro, Joaquin Wilde, and Elektra Lopez) sometime soon.

In the third match, Nikkita Lyons and Cora Jade took on Natalya and Lash Legend. In the climax, after an even match, Lyons and Legend were trading roll-ups when Natalya accidentally superkicked Legend. Lyons followed up with a Superkick and a split leg drop on Legend, after which, Jade tagged in and performed a Senton on Legend to win the match.

Following this, footage was shown of the fifth woman presented in the inaugural NXT Women's Breakout Tournament, Tatum Paxley.

After that, Gigi Dolin and Jacy Jayne were enjoying their time at the beach when Wendy Choo and Roxanne Perez stole their car keys and shoes. It was then announced that an NXT Women's Tag Team Championship match pitting Dolin and Jayne against Choo and Perez was scheduled for the following week.

In the penultimate match, The Creed Brothers (Brutus Creed and Julius Creed) took on The Viking Raiders (Erik and Ivar). During the match, Ivar performed a powerbomb on Erik onto Brutus, and Ivar followed up with a splash on Brutus for a nearfall. Later, The Viking Raiders had Julius pinned, but Brutus broke up the pin. In the climax, after Brutus tossed Ivar out of the ring, Roderick Strong interfered with a Running Knee on Erik, allowing Julius to perform a basement lariat on Erik to win the match.

Before the main event, Santos Escobar and AJ Galante met in the parking lot, but as they shook hands, Escobar attacked him. Joaquin Wilde and Cruz Del Toro then placed Galante in the back of Escobar's SUV.

=== Main event ===
In the main event, Bron Breakker defended the NXT Championship against Joe Gacy. Gacy dominated the match, while Breakker told Gacy to not mess with Breakker's family. Gacy performed a lariat and a leg drop on Breakker, but both resulted in nearfalls. Gacy performed a Scorpion Death Drop on Breakker for a nearfall, after which, Gacy's druids appeared behind the ring post. After more back-and-forth action, Gacy performed an Alabama Slam and a Powerbomb on Breakker for a nearfall. As Gacy went for the Upside-Down World, Breakker avoided it and performed a Spear on Gacy to retain the title. After the match, the druids went to the ring apron, surrounding Breakker. After the event went off the air, the druids viciously attacked Breakker before placing him on a stretcher and carrying him out of the Performance Center.

== Aftermath ==
On the following episode of NXT, Joe Gacy offered NXT Champion Bron Breakker an invitation to join his movement. The following week, Breakker declined. Gacy then offered Breakker a rematch for the title, adding the stipulation that Breakker would lose the championship if he was disqualified due to him not being able to control his anger, making the match official for In Your House.

Also on NXT, Solo Sikoa wanted another shot at the NXT North American Championship, and defending champion Cameron Grimes said that he would get the match after Grimes defeated Carmelo Hayes at In Your House. The next day, a title match between Grimes and Hayes was made official for In Your House.

The Creed Brothers (Brutus Creed and Julius Creed) were upset about how they defeated The Viking Raiders (Erik and Ivar), and Brutus said that it was how they were going to defeat The Viking Raiders in a rematch the following week. Roderick Strong stated that he would be bringing in Damon Kemp to Diamond Mine. The following week, The Viking Raiders (Erik and Ivar) defeated The Creed Brothers due to an untimely assist from Strong and Kemp.

Santos Escobar stated that AJ Galante was fair game in the war due to his interference in the peace talks. Tony D'Angelo then kidnapped Cruz Del Toro, and a match between D'Angelo and Escobar was scheduled for the May 17 episode. During the match, a brawl between Toro, Joaquin Wilde, Channing "Stacks" Lorenzo, and Troy "Two Dimes" Donovan occurred at ringside, allowing Escobar to strike D'Angelo with brass knuckles to win the match. The following week, after Lorenzo and Donovan's match, the two teams engaged into another brawl. On the May 31 episode, the two teams agreed to a six-man tag team match at In Your House where the losing team would join the winning team's stable.

Toxic Attraction (Gigi Dolin and Jacy Jayne) retained the NXT Women's Tag Team Championship against Wendy Choo and Roxanne Perez after interference from NXT Women's Champion Mandy Rose. On the May 24 episode, Choo attacked Rose after the latter's match, after which, Rose accepted Choo's challenge for an NXT Women's Championship match, which was scheduled for In Your House in a Women's Championship Summit the following week.

Natalya and Cora Jade had a match on the following episode of NXT which Natalya won. Afterwards, Jade and Natalya showed each other respect.

A second Spring Breakin' was confirmed for the following year, establishing Spring Breakin' as an annual Spring event for NXT.

== Results ==
No.	Results	Stipulations	Times
1	Cameron Grimes (c) defeated Solo Sikoa and Carmelo Hayes (with Trick Williams) by pinfall	Triple threat match for the NXT North American Championship	14:06
2	Nathan Frazer (with Chase University (Andre Chase and Bodhi Hayward)) defeated Grayson Waller by pinfall	Singles match	12:45
3	Cora Jade and Nikkita Lyons defeated Natalya and Lash Legend by pinfall	Tag team match	13:28
4	The Creed Brothers (Brutus Creed and Julius Creed) defeated The Viking Raiders (Erik and Ivar) by pinfall	Tag team match	12:58
5	Bron Breakker (c) defeated Joe Gacy by pinfall	Singles match for the NXT Championship	11:03
(c) / – the champion(s) heading into the match
