= Nathan Frazer =

Jèrriais professional wrestler (born 1998)

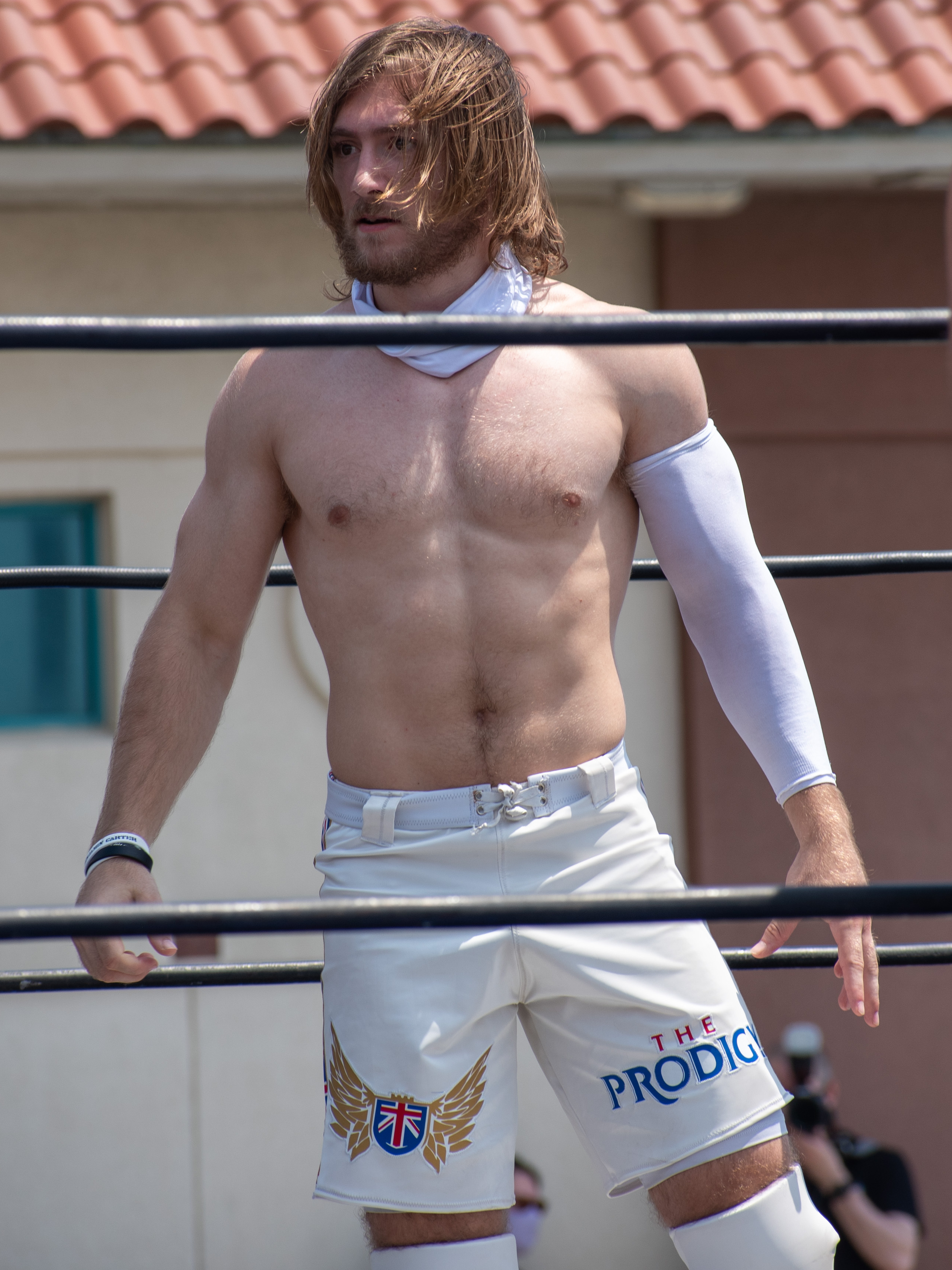
- Frazer in 2020

Personal information
- Born: Benjamin Timms; 23 July 1998 (age 28) Jersey, Channel Islands

Professional wrestling career
- Ring name(s): Ben Carter; Benjamin Carter; CJ Storm; Nathan Frazer
- Billed height: 5 ft 10 in (178 cm)
- Billed weight: 182 lb (83 kg)
- Trained by: Seth Rollins; Marek Brave
- Debut: 31 August 2018

Benjamin Timms (born 23 July 1998) is a Jèrriais professional wrestler. He is signed to WWE, where he performs on the SmackDown brand under the ring name Nathan Frazer and is one-half of Fraxiom along with Axiom. He is a former one-time NXT Heritage Cup Champion and a two-time NXT Tag Team Champion with Axiom.

== Professional wrestling career ==
=== Early career (2018–2020) ===
Benjamin Timms was trained by fellow professional wrestlers Seth Rollins and Marek Brave at the Black and Brave Wrestling Academy in the United States. Timms made his professional wrestling debut in 2018 under the ring name Benjamin Carter, performing in various independent promotions including big name promotion: Resolute Wrestling in Crossville, TN where he defeated names such as Toby Farley, Caleb Courageous and Christopher Carlton and then moved on to other major promotions such as Impact Wrestling and All Elite Wrestling (AEW).

=== All Elite Wrestling (2020) ===
In 2020, Timms was invited by All Elite Wrestling's head of Talent Relations Christopher Daniels to appear for the promotion. Timms made his AEW debut in September 2020 at Daily's Place in Jacksonville, Florida. Timms, under his ring name Ben Carter, faced off against Ricky Starks in a losing effort on Dark. Carter made his Dynamite debut in the opening contest of 'Late Night Dynamite', losing against Scorpio Sky. Carter went on to have a 1-2 record before signing with the WWE later that year. In October 2020, it was revealed that Carter could not get legally paid for his AEW matches, due to not having a valid work visa in the United States.

=== WWE (2020–present) ===
==== NXT UK and NXT (2020–2023) ====
On 17 December 2020, WWE announced that they signed Timms. He was then assigned to the NXT UK brand where, on the episode 7 January 2021 episode of NXT UK, he made his debut under the ring name Ben Carter, facing Jordan Devlin for the NXT Cruiserweight Championship but lost. After defeating Josh Morell and Sam Gradwell, Carter was repackaged as Nathan Frazer on 11 March.

On the 3 June episode of NXT UK, Frazer and Jack Starz teamed up to face Pretty Deadly (Lewis Howley and Sam Stoker) for the NXT UK Tag Team Championship but were defeated. Later, Frazer competed to become the No. 1 contender for the NXT UK Heritage Cup but he lost to Teoman in the first round. Subsequently, Frazer also competed to become the No. 1 contender for the NXT United Kingdom Championship on 23 September, competed against A-Kid and Rampage Brown, where the former won. On 3 March 2022, Frazer fought his last match at NXT UK in a NXT United Kingdom Championship match, losing to Ilja Dragunov.

On 12 April 2022, it was announced that Frazer would make his NXT debut. At Spring Breakin' on 3 May, he debuted by defeating Grayson Waller due to the interference of Andre Chase. On the 2 August episode of NXT 2.0, Frazer responded to Carmelo Hayes' open challenge for the NXT North American Championship but lost when Giovanni Vinci interfered. On the 13 June 2023 episode of NXT, Frazer defeated Oro Mensah 2–1, who wrestled on behalf of Noam Dar due to Dar suffering an injury, to become the NXT Heritage Cup Champion. Frazer lost the Cup back to Dar 69 days later at NXT: Heatwave.

==== Fraxiom (2023–present) ====
In late 2023, Frazer formed a tag team partnership with Axiom (with the team later known as Fraxiom). The duo won the 2024 NXT Tag Team Championship Eliminator Tournament to face NXT Tag Team Champions The Wolf Dogs (Baron Corbin and Bron Breakker) for the titles at NXT Stand & Deliver on 6 April 2024 but failed to win the match. In a rematch on the following episode of NXT, Fraxiom defeated The Wolf Dogs to become the new NXT Tag Team Champions. Much later, Frazer started to set his sights on singles titles to Axiom's displeasure. On the 25 June episode of NXT, Frazer failed to defeat Tony D'Angelo for the NXT Heritage Cup. On the following day's episode of Speed, he defeated Akira Tozawa to advance in the Speed Championship #1 Contender's tournament but lost to The New Day's Xavier Woods in the final the next week. After multiple successful title defenses, on the 13 August episode of NXT, Chase University's Andre Chase and Ridge Holland defeated Fraxiom for the NXT Tag Team Championship, ending their reign at 126 days. The pair regained the titles in a rematch 19 days later at NXT No Mercy to become two-time champions. Soon after, Frazer began to set his sights on singles championships again. On the November 19 episode of NXT, Frazer defeated Eddy Thorpe to qualify for the Iron Survivor Challenge at NXT Deadline on 7 December, where Frazer failed to win the Iron Survivor Challenge but Fraxiom successfully defended the NXT Tag Team Championship against No Quarter Catch Crew (Myles Borne and Tavion Heights). At NXT: Roadblock on 11 March 2025, Fraxiom failed to defeat TNA World Tag Team Champions The Hardy Boyz for the title. On the 4 April episode of SmackDown, Frazer made his main roster debut where he lost to a debuting Rey Fénix. At NXT Stand & Deliver on April 19, Fraxiom lost the NXT Tag Team Championships to Hank and Tank (Hank Walker and Tank Ledger) in their final match for NXT, ending their second reign at 230 days.

On the 25 April episode of SmackDown, Fraxiom were promoted to the SmackDown brand, where they defeated Legado Del Fantasma's Los Garza (Angel and Berto) in their first match as a team in the main roster. After four successive tag team match wins, including a non-title match against WWE Tag Team Champions The Street Profits (Angelo Dawkins and Montez Ford), Fraxiom faced The Street Profits for the titles on the 23 May episode of SmackDown which ended in a no-contest after interference from #DIY (Johnny Gargano and Tommaso Ciampa) and Candice LeRae, Motor City Machine Guns (Alex Shelley and Chris Sabin), and the returning Wyatt Sicks (Uncle Howdy, Erick Rowan, Dexter Lumis, Joe Gacy and Nikki Cross).

=== Total Nonstop Action Wrestling (2025) ===
Timms, as Nathan Frazer, alongside the debuting Axiom returned to Total Nonstop Action Wrestling (TNA) at Genesis on 19 January 2025 during the tag team title match between TNA World Tag Team Champions The Hardys (Matt Hardy and Jeff Hardy) and The Rascalz (Trey Miguel and Zachary Wentz). Later that night, it was announced that The Rascalz will face Fraxiom for the NXT Tag Team Championship on the 23 January episode of Impact!, becoming the first WWE wrestlers to defend a WWE championship in TNA where they successfully retained the titles after interference from Wes Lee, Tyriek Igwe and Tyson Dupont.

== Personal life ==
On 19 April 2023, Timms became a born-again Christian, announcing he had been baptized.

== Other media ==
As Nathan Frazer, he made his video game debut in WWE 2K23 as downloadable content in the Bad News U pack. He also appears as a regular game character in the WWE 2K24 , WWE 2K25, and WWE 2K26 Video games.

== Championships and accomplishments ==
- Pro Wrestling Illustrated
  - Ranked No. 165 of the top 500 singles wrestlers in the PWI 500 in 2023
  - Ranked No. 2 of the top 100 tag team wrestlers in the PWI 100 in 2024 – with Axiom
- Resolute Wrestling
  - Resolute P4P Championship (1 time)
  - Resolute Undisputed Championship (2 times)
- SCW Pro Wrestling
  - SCW Pro Iowa Wrestling Championship (1 time)
- WWE
  - NXT Heritage Cup (1 time)
  - NXT Tag Team Championship (2 times) – with Axiom
  - NXT Tag Team Championship Eliminator Tournament (2024) – with Axiom
  - NXT Year-End Award (1 time)
    - Tag Team of the Year (2024) – with Axiom
