= Grayson Waller =

Australian professional wrestler (born 1990)

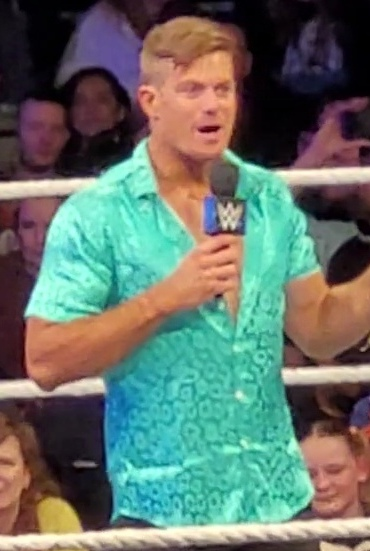
- Waller in 2023

Personal information
- Born: Matthew Farrelly; 21 March 1990 (age 36) Sydney, New South Wales, Australia

Professional wrestling career
- Ring name(s): Grayson Waller; Matty Wahlberg
- Billed height: 6 ft 3 in (191 cm)
- Billed weight: 202 lb (92 kg)
- Billed from: Sydney, Australia
- Trained by: Robbie Eagles; Madison Eagles
- Debut: 15 April 2017

Matthew Farrelly (born 21 March 1990) is an Australian professional wrestler. As of March 2021, he is signed to WWE, where he performs on the NXT brand under the ring name Grayson Waller and is the current NXT Champion in his first reign. He is also a former one-time WWE Tag Team Champion alongside Austin Theory as A-Town Down Under.

Before signing with WWE, he previously performed on the independent circuit under the ring name Matty Wahlberg. Outside of professional wrestling, Farrelly was a contestant on season six of Australian Survivor.

== Professional wrestling career ==
=== Independent circuit (2017–2021) ===
On 15 April 2017, at a Newcastle Pro Wrestling event, Farrelly made his debut under the ring name Matty Wahlberg (the last name being a reference to Hollywood actor Mark Wahlberg), losing to SnapChad. Wahlberg would form a tag team with Carter Dreams, known as The BABES (Blonde And Blue Eyed Squad), managed by Harley Wonderland. Wahlberg then returned to singles competition and he would receive a PWA Heavyweight Championship match against Caveman Ugg, but lost to Ugg at the PWA Black Label: Wahlberg Vs. Ugg event in March 2019. At the PWA Black Label: Break Their Back & Make Them Rumble event, Wahlberg lost to TJ Perkins. At the PWA Black Label: Colosseum event, Wahlberg won the 2019 Colosseum tournament by defeating Chris Basso in the first round, Orange Cassidy in the semi-finals, and Travis Banks in the final. After the PWA Black Label: It Started Out With A Kiss event went off the air, Wahlberg addressed the live crowd, informing them that he was leaving PWA. On 12 October 2024, Farrelly returned to PWA under his WWE ring name Grayson Waller, defeating Jimmy Townsend during Night One of the Colosseum Tournament.

=== WWE ===
==== NXT (2021–2023) ====
On 14 March 2021, it was reported that Farrelly had signed with WWE. On the 11 June episode of 205 Live, he made his WWE debut under the ring name Grayson Waller, defeating Sunil Singh. He then made his debut for NXT on the 24 August episode of NXT, teaming with Drake Maverick against Imperium's Marcel Barthel and Fabian Aichner, where they lost. On the 28 September episode of NXT, Waller took on newly crowned NXT Cruiserweight Champion Roderick Strong for the title after issuing the challenge the week prior, and would go on to lose the match. On the 9 November episode of NXT, he lost to Solo Sikoa in a triple threat match which also included LA Knight.

On the 23 November episode of NXT, Waller berated the fans, thus turning heel. At NXT WarGames, he teamed up with Bron Breakker, Carmelo Hayes, and Tony D'Angelo as Team 2.0, where they defeated Team Black & Gold (Johnny Gargano, LA Knight, Pete Dunne, and Tommaso Ciampa) in a WarGames match. On the following episode of NXT, Waller brutally attacked Johnny Gargano during his farewell promo where he thanked his fans and friends, thus cementing his heel turn. On the 21 December episode of NXT, he attacked Dexter Lumis after the latter's match and announces that he will dismantle the old NXT one by one, and he then confronted AJ Styles, whom he had criticized on social networks a few days before. At NXT: New Years Evil on 4 January 2022, Styles once again confronted Waller, resulting into a brawl between the pair. The following week, Waller lost to Styles. After the match, he was attacked by the returning LA Knight. On the 1 February episode of NXT, Waller, alongside his new "insurance policy" Sanga, interfered in Knight's match against Joe Gacy, causing Knight to lose the match. At NXT: Roadblock on 8 March, Waller defeated Knight in a Last Man Standing match when he used Sanga to make it to his feet and beat the ten count.

At NXT Stand & Deliver, Waller failed to win the NXT North American Championship in a ladder match. Waller and Sanga would enter the tag team gauntlet match for the vacant NXT Tag Team Championship, where they were eliminated by the Creed Brothers. Waller then turned on Sanga and defeated him a week later on the 19 April episode of NXT. Waller then briefly feuded with the debuting Nathan Frazer, who he lost to at Spring Breakin'. Waller would then pursue the NXT North American Championship by tricking Carmelo Hayes into signing the contract. At NXT: The Great American Bash on 5 July, Waller lost to Hayes due to interference from Trick Williams and Wes Lee. Despite this, Waller blamed his loss on Wes Lee and defeated him on the 26 July episode of NXT due to interference from Williams. Waller then started a rivalry with Apollo Crews, defeating him on the 30 August episode of NXT after "injuring" his eye, but lost to him at NXT Halloween Havoc in a casket match.

At NXT Deadline, Waller won the inaugural Iron Survivor Challenge to become the number one contender for Bron Breakker's NXT Championship. The match was later scheduled for NXT: New Year's Evil on 10 January 2023, where the match ended when the middle rope snapped, causing Waller to fall out of the ring and be counted out, allowing Breakker to retain the title. A steel cage match between the two for the title was subsequently scheduled for NXT Vengeance Day on 4 February, where Waller again failed to win the title. At NXT Roadblock, Waller hosted The Grayson Waller Effect with NXT Commissioner Shawn Michaels as the special guest, where he challenged Michaels to come out of retirement for a match at NXT Stand & Deliver. Michaels, however, said that someone wanted a match with Waller more than him, which was revealed to be the returning Johnny Gargano. At NXT Stand and Deliver on 1 April, Waller and Gargano faced off in an unsanctioned match, which Waller lost. On the 11 April episode of NXT, Waller won a fatal four-way match to earn an NXT Championship match against Carmelo Hayes at Spring Breakin', where Waller failed to win the championship from Hayes in what would be his final match in NXT. It was later revealed that Waller broke his leg towards the end of the match.

==== Main roster (2023–2026) ====
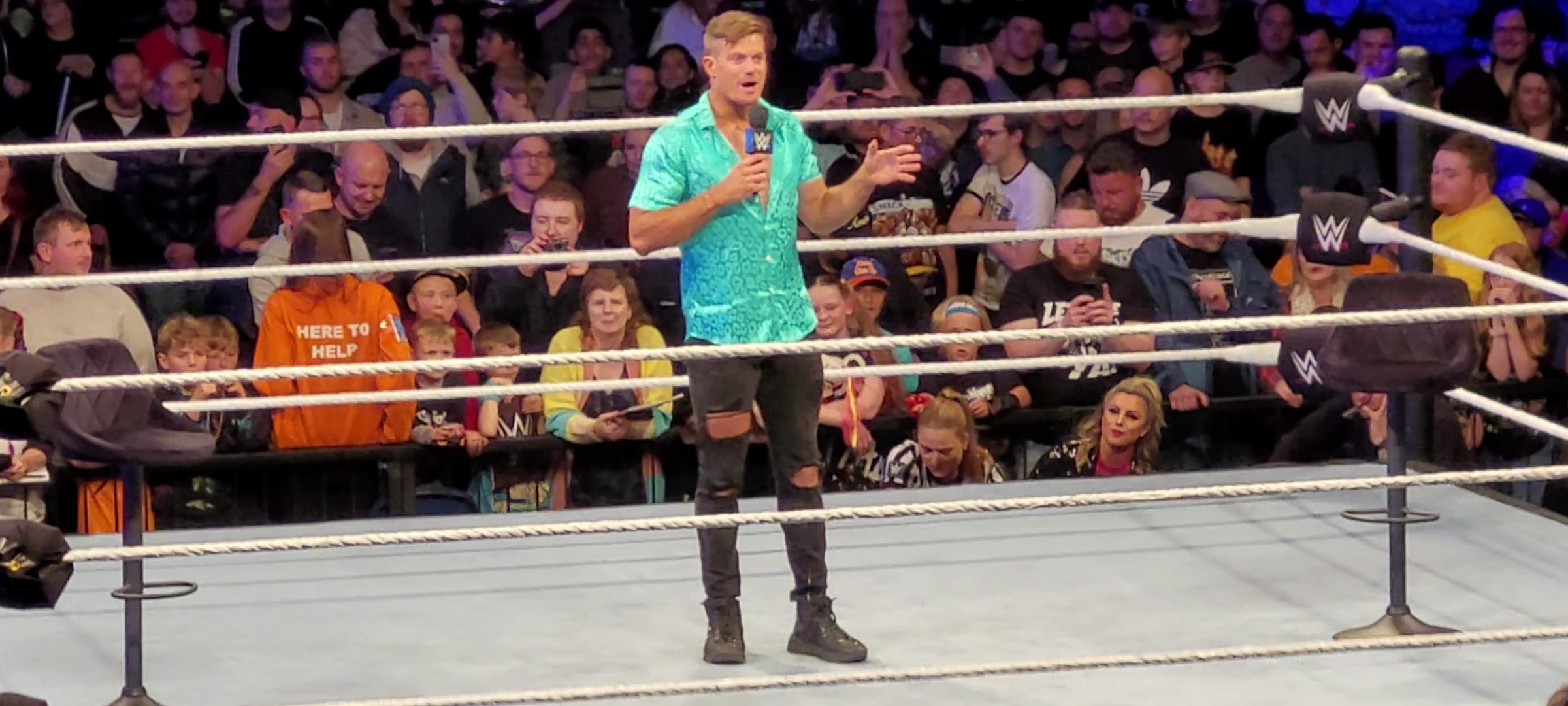
Waller presenting "The Grayson Waller Effect" in 2023.

As part of the 2023 WWE Draft, Waller was drafted to the SmackDown brand. He made his SmackDown debut on 19 May 2023, interviewing AJ Styles on The Grayson Waller Effect. At Money in the Bank, Waller interrupted the returning John Cena, where he confronted and attacked Cena before getting hit with an Attitude Adjustment. On the 7 July episode of SmackDown, Waller interviewed Edge on The Grayson Waller Effect. Waller then made his main roster in-ring debut later that night against Edge, who would defeat him. Despite the loss, Edge would praise Waller. On the 15 September episode of SmackDown, Waller interviewed Cena on The Grayson Waller Effect for The Bloodline to come out. On the 10 November episode of SmackDown, Waller and his new tag team partner Austin Theory (who are collectively known as A-Town Down Under) provoked the newest member of the SmackDown roster Kevin Owens. Owens attacked both Waller and Theory and was suspended by the WWE.

On the 15 December episode of SmackDown, both Waller and Theory lost in the first rounds of the United States Championship #1 Contender Tournament to former rival Carmelo Hayes and Owens respectively. Waller returned to NXT at NXT: New Year's Evil on 2 January 2024 and was put into a match against Trick Williams for Williams' Iron Survivor Challenge title match opportunity by Hayes. Waller lost the match after interference from Owens. At the Royal Rumble on January 27, Waller entered his first Royal Rumble match at #3, lasting four minutes before being eliminated by Hayes. At Elimination Chamber: Perth held in his home country of Australia, Waller co-hosted The Grayson Waller Effect with Theory featuring Cody Rhodes and Seth Rollins as his guests. Seth and Cody then attacked Theory and Waller did not get involved, teasing the dissolution of their tag team. On the 26 February episode of Raw, Waller, in his debut match on Raw, was defeated by Rhodes in the main event.

Waller and Theory went on to win a tag team tournament, defeating The O.C. (Karl Anderson and Luke Gallows) on the 22 March episode of SmackDown and The Street Profits (Angelo Dawkins and Montez Ford) in the finals one week later to qualify for the six-pack ladder match for the Undisputed WWE Tag Team Championship at WrestleMania XL. At Night 1 of WrestleMania XL, Waller retrieved the SmackDown Tag Team Championship for A-Town Down Under to become the new champions, thus making it Waller's first championship win in WWE. On the 19 April episode of SmackDown, the SmackDown Tag Team Championship was renamed as the WWE Tag Team Championship and the team was presented with new title belts by WWE's chief content officer Paul "Triple H" Levesque, and the general manager of SmackDown Nick Aldis. On the May 3 episode of SmackDown, Theory and Waller defeated The Street Profits (Angelo Dawkins and Montez Ford) in their first title defense. On the July 5 episode of SmackDown, Grayson Waller and Austin Theory as A-Town Down Under lost the titles to #DIY (Johnny Gargano and Tommaso Ciampa), ending their reign at 90 days. Grayson Waller and Austin Theory also had previously feuded with #DIY weeks before the title loss. They failed to win the titles in a rematch on the following episode of SmackDown, ending their feud.

After a promo on social media the previous week, Waller and Theory returned to NXT on 24 September, challenging Nathan Frazer and Axiom for the NXT Tag Team Championship, which they accepted. Later that night, they defeated Cedric Alexander and Je'Von Evans following a backstage confrontation. On the 8 October episode of NXT, they failed to win the titles from Fraxiom. On the 13 December episode of SmackDown, Waller and Theory met with Braun Strowman backstage and asked him to be a guest on The Grayson Waller Effect next week, which Strowman accepted. On the 20 December episode of SmackDown, Waller hosted The Grayson Waller Effect alongside Austin Theory with Braun Strowman as the special guest, which was later interrupted by Carmelo Hayes. On the 24 January 2025 episode of SmackDown, it was announced by SmackDown general manager Nick Aldis that A-Town Down Under would be moving to the Raw brand as part of the transfer window. On the 28 January episode of NXT, A-Town Down Under hosted a special edition of The Grayson Waller Effect with the new NXT Champion Oba Femi as guest to see if Femi was "worth the hype." Femi then offered to defend the NXT Championship in a triple threat match against A-Town Down Under at NXT Vengeance Day on 15 February, where Femi retained the title after Waller cost Theory the win.

Following Theory's legitimate injury, which marked the quiet disbandment of A-Town Down Under, on the July 21, 2025 episode of Raw, Waller began aligning himself with The New Day (Kofi Kingston and Xavier Woods). The alliance ended on May 2, 2026 after Kingston and Woods departed WWE.

==== NXT Champion (2026–present) ====
On the 28 July 2026 episode of NXT, Waller returned to the brand and cut a worked shoot promo about his main roster tenure while also criticizing the NXT men's roster and announced his goal to become NXT Champion. Waller won the title from Tony D'Angelo at NXT Heatwave on 30 August in a fatal four-way match also involving Cruz Montana and the debuting Zilla Fatu, becoming the first Australian to hold the NXT Championship. On the 29 September episode of NXT, Waller was originally scheduled to defend his NXT Championship against Mason Rook. However, just before the show started, it was reported that Rook had not been medically cleared to compete, but per NXT General Manager Robert Stone, Waller would still be defending his title. Waller then issued an open challenge for the NXT Championship to any member of the NXT roster who gets to the ring first, which was answered by EK Prosper, who Waller would go on to defeat in his first successful title defense. At NXT Halloween Havoc on October 31, Waller defeated D'Angelo to retain the title. At NXT on November 4, Waller defeated CM Punk to retain the title, thanks to intereference from Kevin Owens.

== Other media ==
In 2019, Farrelly appeared on Australian Survivor: Champions vs. Contenders 2. He competed on the Contenders team, and garnered attention for his outspoken personality, essentially playing a version of his Matty Wahlberg wrestling character on reality television. He would be eliminated from the competition after several weeks on the island.

Farrelly also made a cameo appearance on Young Rock in 2021, playing the role of Ric Flair.

Farrelly, as Grayson Waller, made his first video game appearance in WWE 2K23, also returning for WWE 2K24 and would appear again in WWE 2K25 and WWE 2K26.

== Personal life ==
Farrelly is a former Golden Gloves boxer in Australia, and also worked as a history teacher at De La Salle College Revesby in Revesby Heights, New South Wales while competing on the Australian independent circuit on the weekends. He left his teaching job in 2021 after signing with WWE and became a full-time professional wrestler. Farrelly is a supporter of the NRL's Sydney Roosters, the NFL’s Philadelphia Eagles, and the NBA's Sacramento Kings.

== Championships and accomplishments ==
- Future Wrestling Australia
  - FWA Heavyweight Championship (1 time)
- Newcastle Pro Wrestling
  - Newy Pro Middleweight Championship (1 time)
  - King of the Castles (2018) – with Carter Deams
- Pro Wrestling Australia
  - PWA Colosseum Tournament (2019)
- Pro Wrestling Illustrated
  - Ranked No. 409 of the top singles wrestlers in the PWI 500 in 2026
- Wrestling GO!
  - Wrestling GO! Silver Medal Championship (1 time)
  - Wrestling GO! 24/7 Watermelon Championship (1 time)
  - Wrestling GO! Year End Awards (3 times)
    - Male Wrestler of the Year (2018)
    - Match of the Year (2018) – Dalton Castle vs Matty Wahlberg vs Ricky South
    - Rivalry of the Year (2018) – Matty Wahlberg vs Ricky South
- WWE
  - NXT Championship (1 time, current)
  - WWE Tag Team Championship (1 time) – with Austin Theory
  - WrestleMania XL Six-Pack Ladder Match SmackDown Qualifier Tournament (2024) – with Austin Theory
  - Men's Iron Survivor Challenge (2022)
