= Bron Breakker =

American professional wrestler (born 1997)

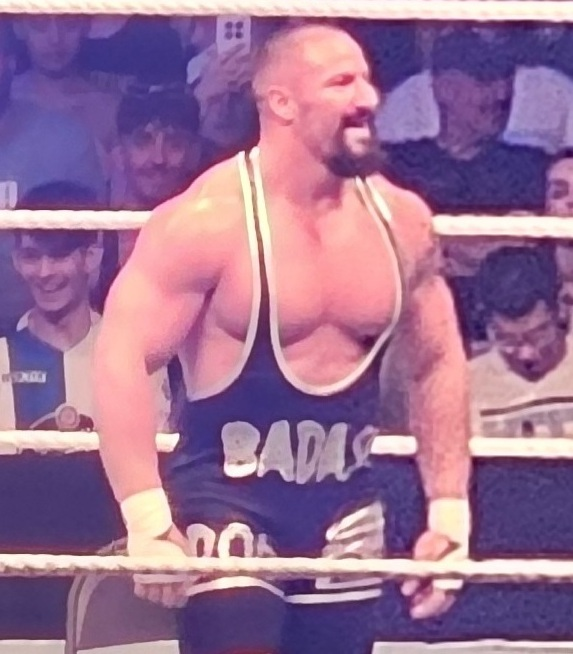
- Breakker in 2026

Personal information
- Born: Bronson Rechsteiner; October 24, 1997 (age 29) Woodstock, Georgia, U.S.
- Education: Kennesaw State University
- Parent: Rick Steiner (father)
- Relative: Scott Steiner (uncle)

Professional wrestling career
- Ring name(s): Bron Breakker; Bronson Rechsteiner
- Billed height: 6 ft 0 in (183 cm)
- Billed weight: 250 lb (113 kg)
- Billed from: Atlanta, Georgia; Woodstock, Georgia
- Trained by: WWE Performance Center
- Debut: April 9, 2016

Bronson Rechsteiner (born October 24, 1997) is an American professional wrestler and former football player. As of February 2021, he is signed to WWE, where he performs on the Raw brand under the ring name Bron Breakker and is a member of The Vision stable.

Born in Woodstock, Georgia, Rechsteiner played high school football and briefly joined the Baltimore Ravens as an undrafted free agent fullback. A second-generation professional wrestler, Rechsteiner is the son of Rick Steiner and the nephew of Scott Steiner (who performed together as the Steiner Brothers). He made his professional wrestling debut in 2016 and signed with WWE in 2021, spending three years in the NXT developmental brand where he became a two-time NXT Champion, a one-time NXT Tag Team Champion and the winner of the 2024 Men's Dusty Rhodes Tag Team Classic alongside Baron Corbin. He joined the Raw brand in 2024 where he is a former two-time WWE Intercontinental Champion and two-time World Tag Team Champion alongside Austin Theory. He was voted "Rookie of the Year" for 2022 by readers of the Wrestling Observer Newsletter.

== Early life and football career ==
Bronson Rechsteiner was born on October 24, 1997 in Woodstock, Georgia. He attended Etowah High School in Woodstock, where he played football, winning varsity letters in three years. He also participated in wrestling, winning the Georgia Class AAAAAA state championship (220 lb weight class) in 2016. After graduating from high school, Rechsteiner went on to study at Georgia's Kennesaw State University, majoring in criminal justice. While attending Kennesaw, Rechsteiner played football for the Kennesaw State Owls. As a freshman in 2016 he played special teams and defense; in 2017, he moved to offense as a running back. In February 2020, Rechsteiner entered the National Football League Draft but was not drafted. In April 2020, he was signed by the Baltimore Ravens as an undrafted free agent fullback. He was released in August 2020.

Pre-draft measurables
Height	Weight	Arm length	Hand span	Wingspan	40-yard dash	10-yard split	20-yard split	20-yard shuttle	Three-cone drill	Vertical jump	Broad jump	Bench press
5 ft 10 1/4 in (1.78 m)	223 lb (101 kg)	31 in (0.79 m)	9 1/8 in (0.23 m)	6 ft 1 5/8 in (1.87 m)	4.50 s	1.54 s	2.50 s	4.22 s	6.95 s	35.5 in (0.90 m)	10 ft 0 in (3.05 m)	35 reps
All values from Pro Day

== Professional wrestling career ==
=== Early career (2016, 2020) ===
Wrestling under his real name, Rechsteiner debuted in professional wrestling on April 9, 2016, for Global Championship Wrestling. He defeated Mr. O'Hagan. After a four-year hiatus, Rechsteiner returned to professional wrestling on October 8, 2020, at the "WrestleJam 8" event promoted by AWF/WOW in Ringgold, Georgia. He defeated Jamie Hall.

=== WWE (2021–present) ===
==== NXT (2021–2024) ====
In February 2021, Rechsteiner signed a developmental contract with WWE. Later that month, he was assigned to the WWE Performance Center in Orlando, Florida for training. At the WrestleMania Backlash pay-per-view on May 16, Rechsteiner and several other wrestlers portrayed "zombies" in a lumberjack match between Damian Priest and The Miz. In August 2021, he appeared on an episode of NXT, portraying a security guard who was attacked by Samoa Joe.

Rechsteiner wrestled his first match for WWE on the September 14, 2021, episode of NXT under the ring name Bron Breakker, defeating LA Knight; he later had a staredown with new NXT Champion Tommaso Ciampa. Breakker unsuccessfully challenged Ciampa for the title at NXT Halloween Havoc on October 26. In November 2021, Breakker participated in WWE's tour of the United Kingdom. At NXT WarGames on December 5, Breakker teamed with Carmelo Hayes, Grayson Waller, and Tony D'Angelo (as "Team 2.0") to defeat Ciampa, Knight, Johnny Gargano, and Pete Dunne ("Team Black & Gold") in a WarGames match, with Breakker pinning Ciampa.

At NXT New Year's Evil on January 4, 2022, Breakker defeated Ciampa by submission to win the NXT Championship. At NXT Vengeance Day on February 15, he made his first successful title defense, defeating Santos Escobar. Breakker made his main roster debut on the March 7 episode of Raw, teaming with Ciampa to defeat Dolph Ziggler and Robert Roode in a tag team match. At NXT Roadblock the following day, Breakker defended the NXT Championship against Ciampa and Ziggler in a triple threat match, with Ziggler pinning Ciampa to end Breakker's first reign at 63 days. On April 1, Breakker inducted his father and uncle into the WWE Hall of Fame; the following night at NXT Stand & Deliver, Breakker failed to regain the title from Ziggler after interference from Roode.

On the April 4, 2022 episode of Raw, Breakker defeated Ziggler to win the NXT Championship for a second time. On the following episode of NXT, he retained the title against Gunther. Breakker subsequently began feuding with Joe Gacy after Gacy kidnapped Rick Steiner, leading to a match between the two at Spring Breakin' on May 3, where Breakker defeated Gacy to retain the title. At NXT In Your House on June 4, he defeated Gacy in a rematch, with the added stipulation that he would lose the title if he got disqualified. At NXT The Great American Bash on July 5, Breakker retained the title against Cameron Grimes, and was attacked by the debuting JD McDonagh after the match. At NXT Heatwave on August 16, Breakker retained the title against McDonagh; after the match, he was confronted by NXT United Kingdom Champion Tyler Bate. At Worlds Collide on September 4, Breakker defeated Bate to unify the NXT Championship and NXT United Kingdom Championship. However, he is not recognized as the final NXT United Kingdom Champion. At NXT Halloween Havoc on October 22, Breakker defeated McDonagh and Ilja Dragunov in a triple threat match to retain the NXT Championship. At NXT Deadline on December 10, Breakker successfully defended the NXT Championship against Apollo Crews. At NXT New Year's Evil on January 10, 2023, Breakker defeated Grayson Waller via countout to retain the NXT Championship. At NXT Vengeance Day on February 4, he defeated Waller once again, this time in a cage match. At NXT Stand & Deliver on April 1, Breakker lost the title to Carmelo Hayes, ending his second reign at 362 days.

On the April 4, 2023 episode of NXT, Breakker attacked Hayes, turning heel. He cemented his new villainous persona the next week by interrupting Chase University in the ring, verbally insulting the audience, and attacking Andre Chase. At Spring Breakin' on April 25, Breakker defeated Chase via submission. At NXT Battleground on May 28, Breakker failed to regain the NXT Championship from Hayes. At NXT Gold Rush on June 20, Breakker unsuccessfully challenged Seth Rollins for the World Heavyweight Championship. At NXT Heatwave on August 22, Breakker attacked Von Wagner; on the September 6 episode of NXT, he bludgeoned Wagner with a set of steel steps. Later that month, Breakker took part in the Superstar Spectacle in Hyderabad, India, defeating Odyssey Jones. At NXT No Mercy on September 30, Breakker lost to Baron Corbin. On the October 10 episode of NXT, Breakker (with Paul Heyman in his corner) lost to Carmelo Hayes (with John Cena in his corner; following the match, Breakker attacked Hayes, prompting The Undertaker to come to the ring and chokeslam Breakker. At NXT Halloween Havoc later that month, Breakker defeated Mr. Stone. On the November 28 episode of NXT, Breakker defeated Eddy Thorpe to qualify for the Iron Survivor Challenge at NXT Deadline, which was won by Trick Williams.

In January 2024, Breakker began to work with Baron Corbin as a tag team, winning the Dusty Rhodes Tag Team Classic tournament and later, the NXT Tag Team Championship after they defeated Tony D'Angelo and Channing "Stacks" Lorenzo. While they retained the titles at NXT Stand & Deliver, against Axiom and Nathan Frazer, they lost in a rematch on the April 9 episode of NXT in what would be Breakker's final match in NXT.

==== Intercontinental Champion (2024–2025) ====
On the February 16, 2024 episode of SmackDown, Breakker joined the SmackDown brand. The next week, Breakker made his in-ring debut for SmackDown by defeating Dante Chen. In the 2024 WWE Draft that April, Breakker was drafted to the Raw brand. At Money in the Bank on July 6, Breakker unsuccessfully challenged Sami Zayn for the WWE Intercontinental Championship, marking his first pinfall loss since joining the main roster. In a rematch at SummerSlam the following month, Breakker defeated Zayn to win the title. On the August 12 episode of Raw, Breakker defeated Zayn to retain the title in a two out of three falls match, ending their feud. On the September 23 episode of Raw, Breakker lost the title to Jey Uso, ending his reign at 51 days.

On the October 21, 2024 episode of Raw, Breakker defeated Jey Uso to regain the Intercontinental Championship after interference by The Bloodline. At Survivor Series: WarGames on November 30, Breakker successfully defended the title against Ludwig Kaiser and Sheamus in a triple threat match. In February 2025, Breakker competed in the Royal Rumble, eliminating three wrestlers before being eliminated by Roman Reigns. On night two of WrestleMania 41, Breakker lost the title to Dominik Mysterio in a fatal four-way match also involving Penta and Finn Bálor, the latter of whom Mysterio pinned, ending his second reign at 181 days.

==== The Vision (2025–present) ====
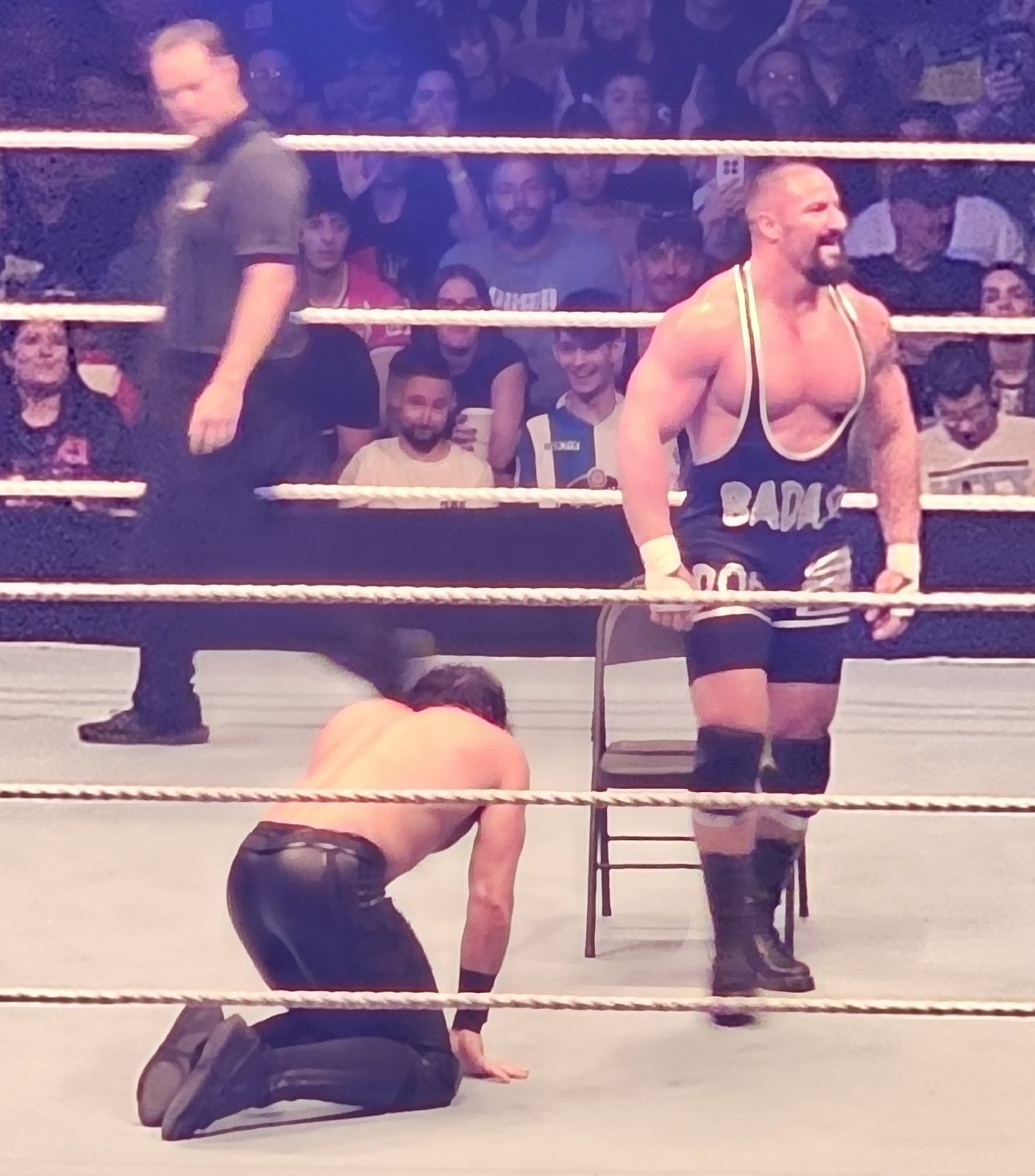
Breakker (right) feuding with the former Vision leader Seth Rollins

On the April 21, 2025 episode of Monday Night Raw, Breakker attacked Roman Reigns and CM Punk, aligning himself with Seth Rollins and Paul Heyman. In May 2025 at Saturday Night's Main Event XXXIX, Breakker and Rollins defeated Punk and Sami Zayn after interference from Bronson Reed, who would go on to join their alliance. In August 2025 at SummerSlam, Breakker and Reed were defeated by Roman Reigns and Jey Uso. Later that month, the alliance of Breakker, Rollins, Reed, and Heyman was dubbed "The Vision". At Wrestlepalooza, Breakker and Reed defeated The Usos with LA Knight serving as the special guest referee. On the October 13 episode of Raw, Breakker and Reed turned on Rollins, exiling him from The Vision. At Survivor Series: WarGames on November 29, Breakker gave his team the victory in a WarGames match when he pinned CM Punk. On the WWE Raw on Netflix Anniversary Show on January 5, 2026, Breakker failed to defeat Punk for the World Heavyweight Championship.

At the Royal Rumble on January 31, Breakker entered the match at #2 only to be eliminated by Oba Femi in under 10 seconds after being attacked by a mysterious hooded figure. In February 2026, Breakker was taken off television due to suffering a hernia. After a two-month hiatus, at Wrestlemania 42 Night 1 on April 18, Breakker made his return, attacking Rollins with a spear and costing him his match against Gunther. At Backlash on May 9, Breakker defeated Rollins. After Paul suffered an arm injury in a title defense at Saturday Night's Main Event on May 23, Breakker was recognized as World Tag Team Champion via the Freebird Rule to defend the titles with Theory during Paul's absence on the May 25 episode of Raw. On the June 22 episode of Raw, Breakker and Theory lost the title to the Street Profits after interference from Joe Hendry and Rollins ending their reign at 84 days. At Night of Champions on June 27, Breakker lost to Rollins in a steel cage match, ending their feud. Breakker and Theory then regained the World Tag Team Championship from The Street Profits on the July 6 episode of Raw thanks to an assist from Maxxine Dupri, who had been courted by Theory and aligned with The Vision. At Sunday Night's Main Event on September 6, Breakker lost to Femi by disqualification after a returning Bronson Reed attacked Femi. On the September 7 episode of Raw, Breakker defeated Rey Mysterio and Ethan Page to qualify for the Men's Money in the Bank ladder match. At the event on October 10, Breakker failed to win the match as it was won by Penta. At Crown Jewel on November 7, Breakker and Theory lost the titles to Je'Von Evans and Penta after interference from Femi ending their second reign at 124 days.

== Professional wrestling style and persona ==
Breakker wrestles in a "powerhouse" style. His finishing moves are a camel clutch dubbed the Steiner Recliner (a move adopted from his uncle Scott Steiner), a gorilla press slam, and a spear.

== Other media ==
Rechsteiner appeared as a playable character in the 2020 video game Madden NFL 21 as a fullback for the Baltimore Ravens. As Bron Breakker, he also appeared as a playable character in WWE 2K23, WWE 2K24, WWE 2K25 and WWE 2K26. In 2025, as Bron Breakker, Rechsteiner appeared in a commercial for Intuit.

== Personal life ==
As of October 2024, Rechsteiner is in a relationship with fellow WWE professional wrestler Izzi Dame.

== Championships and accomplishments ==
=== Amateur wrestling ===
- Georgia Class AAAAAA State Championship (220 lb weight class) (2016)

=== Professional wrestling ===
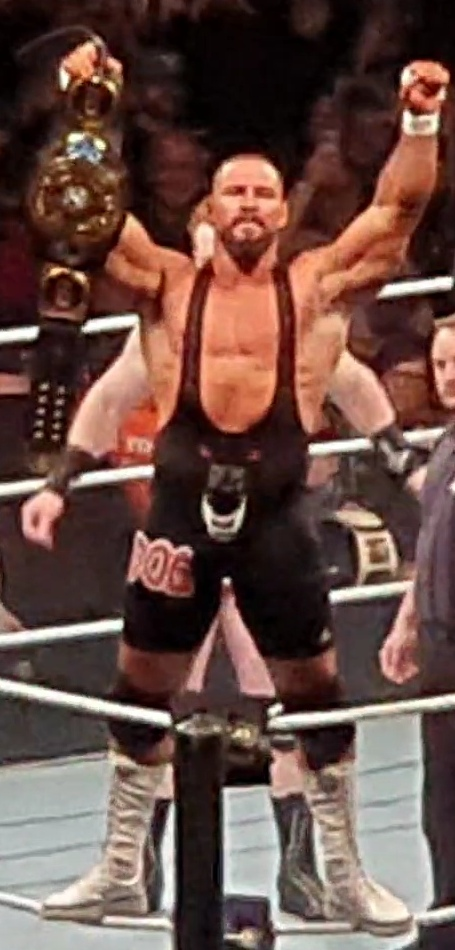
Bron Breakker is a two-time WWE Intercontinental Champion.

- ESPN
  - Ranked number 6 of the 30 best professional wrestlers aged under 30 (2023)
- Pro Wrestling Illustrated
  - Ranked No. 24 of the top 500 singles wrestlers in the PWI 500 in 2025
- Wrestling Observer Newsletter
  - Rookie of the Year (2022)
- WWE
  - WWE Intercontinental Championship (2 times)
  - World Tag Team Championship (2 times) – with Austin Theory
  - NXT Championship (2 times)
  - NXT Tag Team Championship (1 time) – with Baron Corbin
  - Men's Dusty Rhodes Tag Team Classic (2024) – with Baron Corbin

== See also ==
- List of gridiron football players who became professional wrestlers
