= NXT Championship =

WWE men's professional wrestling championship

- The current NXT Championship belt with default side plates (2024–present)

Details
- Promotion: WWE
- Brand: NXT
- Date established: July 1, 2012
- Current champion: Grayson Waller
- Date won: August 30, 2026
Statistics
- First champion: Seth Rollins
- Most reigns: Samoa Joe (3 reigns)
- Longest reign: Adam Cole (396 days) (Note: 403 days as recognized by WWE due to the episode airing on tape delay.)
- Shortest reign: Karrion Kross (1st reign, 4 days) (Note: 3 days as recognized by WWE.)
- Oldest champion: Samoa Joe (42 years, 158 days)
- Youngest champion: Bo Dallas (22 years, 363 days) (Note: WWE recognizes that Dallas won the title when he was 23 years, 18 days old due to the date of his championship win airing on tape delay.)
- Heaviest champion: Keith Lee (340 lb (145 kg))
- Lightest champion: Finn Bálor (190 lb (86 kg))

The NXT Championship is a men's professional wrestling championship created and promoted by the American promotion WWE, defended as the top men's championship of NXT, the promotion's developmental brand. The current champion is Grayson Waller, who is in his first reign. He won the title by defeating previous champion Tony D'Angelo, Cruz Montana, and Zilla Fatu in a fatal four-way match at Heatwave on August 30, 2026.

Introduced on July 1, 2012, it was the first championship established for NXT, and the inaugural champion was Seth Rollins. In September 2019, WWE began promoting NXT as its "third brand" when the NXT television program was moved to the USA Network. The NXT Championship was referred to as a world championship during this time; however, this recognition was dropped when NXT reverted to its original function as WWE's developmental brand in September 2021. In September 2022, the NXT United Kingdom Championship was unified into the NXT Championship.

== History ==
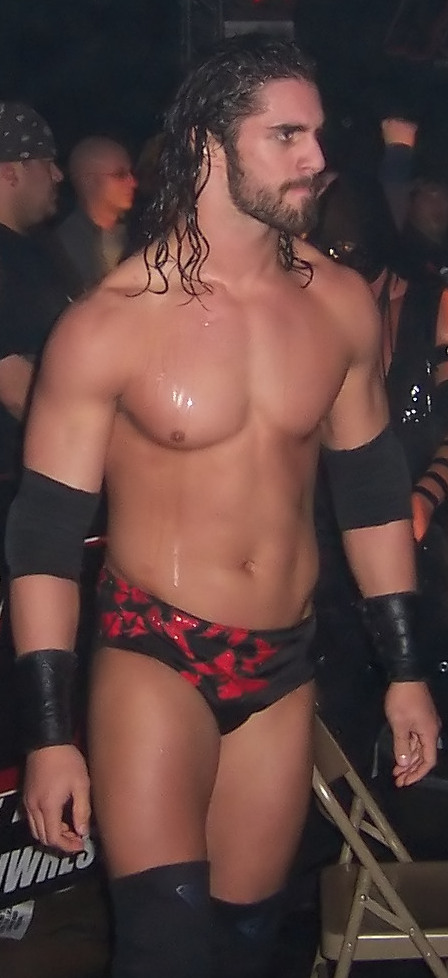
The inaugural NXT Champion Seth Rollins

From 2010 to 2012, the American professional wrestling promotion WWE hosted a competition reality television series called NXT. In June 2012, WWE restructured the show and established the NXT brand as their developmental territory, replacing Florida Championship Wrestling (FCW). On August 1, the brand's first championship, the NXT Championship, was introduced as the top men's championship. NXT Commissioner Dusty Rhodes announced an eight-man single-elimination tournament, dubbed the "Gold Rush" tournament, involving four wrestlers from NXT and four wrestlers from WWE's main roster competing to be crowned the first NXT Champion. On the July 26 tapings of NXT (aired August 29), Seth Rollins defeated Jinder Mahal in the tournament final to become the inaugural champion. On November 19, 2016, at TakeOver: Toronto, Samoa Joe became the first performer to hold the championship on more than one occasion. The title was defended for the first time on the main roster on the June 4, 2015, episode of SmackDown, where Kevin Owens retained the title against Zack Ryder.

In September 2019, the NXT brand became WWE's third major brand when the NXT program was moved to the USA Network. After Drew McIntyre won the NXT Championship in 2017, the match description for his win in the official title history referred to it as a world championship. In 2021, it was revealed that the NXT Championship was an option for the men's Royal Rumble match winner to challenge for at WrestleMania 37, along with the WWE Championship and WWE Universal Championship. However, WWE revamped NXT in September 2021 and returned the brand to its original function as a developmental territory, with it no longer referred to as a world championship and no longer an option for Royal Rumble match winners.

In August 2022, WWE announced that the NXT UK brand would go on hiatus and would relaunch as NXT Europe at a later time. As such, NXT UK's championship's were unified into their respective NXT championship counterparts. On September 4, 2022, at Worlds Collide, reigning NXT Champion Bron Breakker defeated NXT United Kingdom Champion Tyler Bate to unify the NXT United Kingdom Championship into the NXT Championship. Bate was recognized as the final NXT UK Champion, while Breakker went forward as the unified NXT Champion.

=== Inaugural tournament ===
Quarterfinals; NXT; July 12, 2012 (Aired: August 1–8)
Richie Steamboat	Pinfall
Leo Kruger	7:54
Bo Dallas	10:25
Jinder Mahal	Submission
Seth Rollins	Pinfall
Drew McIntyre	11:34
Justin Gabriel	10:25
Michael McGillicutty	Pinfall

Semifinals; NXT; July 12, 2012 (Aired: August 15)
Richie Steamboat	4:43
Jinder Mahal	Submission
Seth Rollins	Pinfall
Michael McGillicutty	8:30

Final; NXT; July 26, 2012 (Aired: August 29)
Jinder Mahal	15:21
Seth Rollins	Pinfall

== Belt designs ==
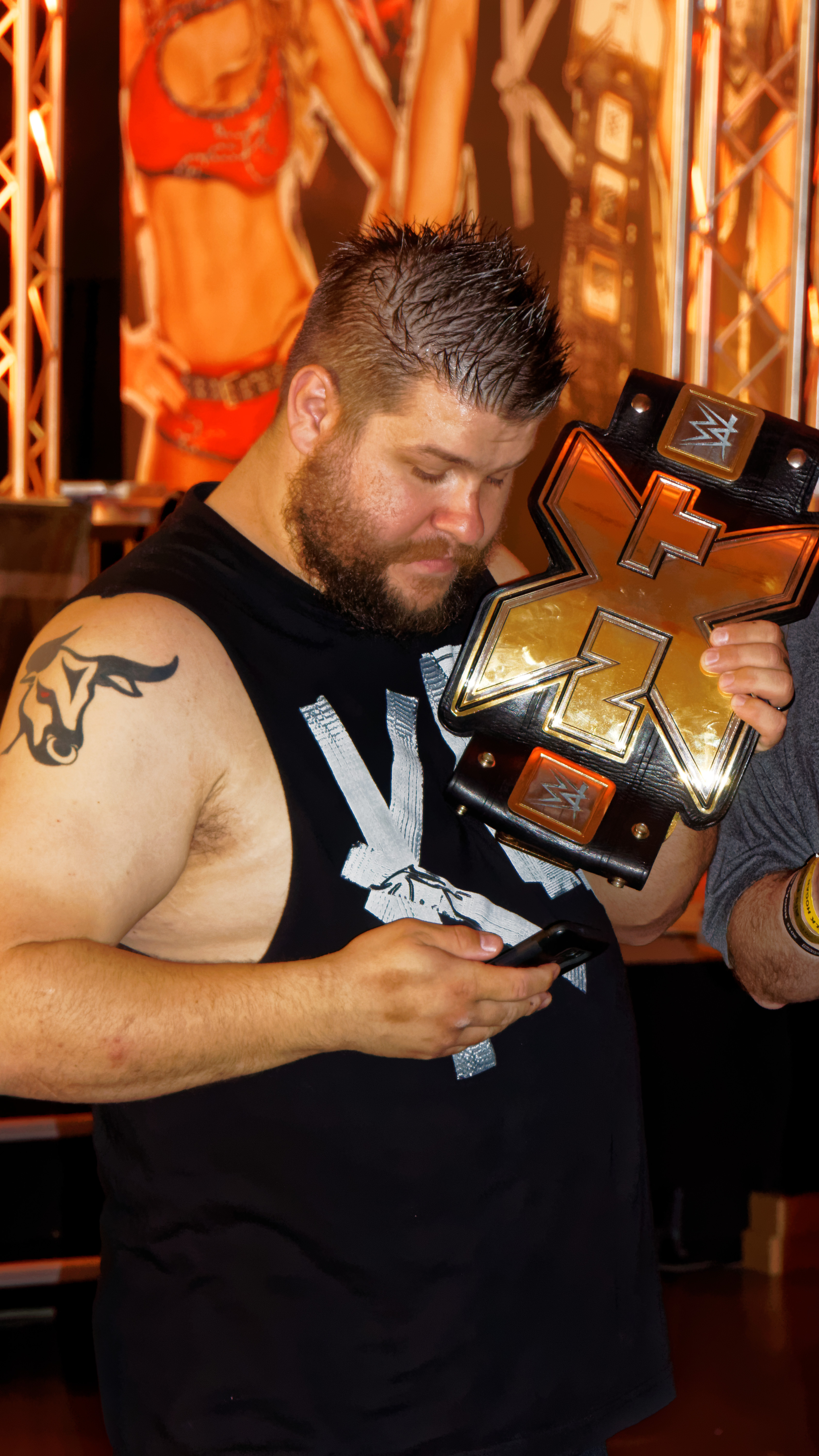
Kevin Owens with the original NXT Championship belt design (2012–2017).

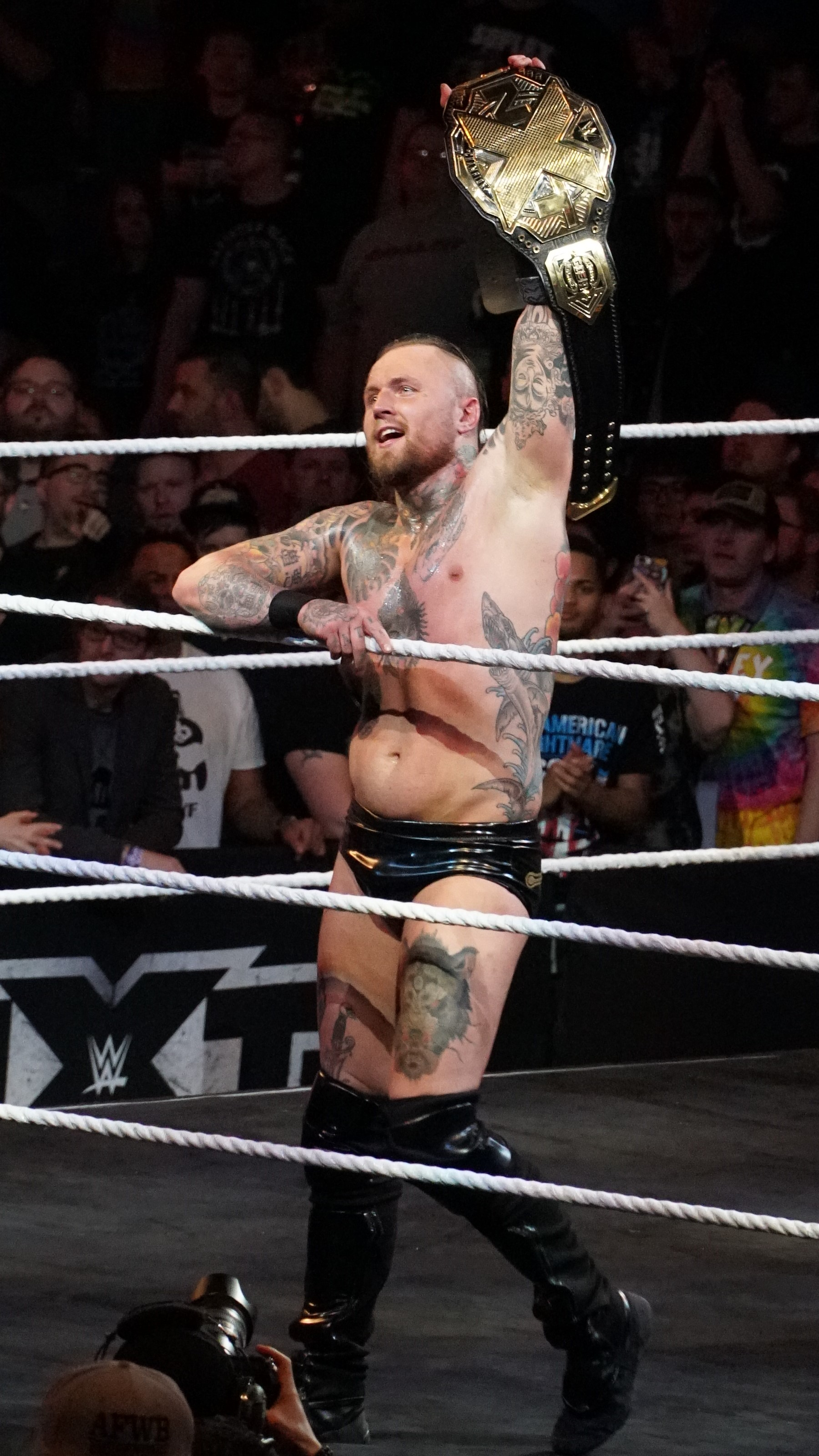
One-time champion Aleister Black with the 2017–2022 version of the championship belt

The original NXT Championship belt's design was simple: a large gold center plate shaped as the letter "X", with smaller letters "N" and "T" to the left and right of the center. The belt contained six total side plates on a large black strap, three sitting on either side of the center plate; each side plate only featured the WWE logo. When first introduced, the side plates had the WWE scratch logo but in August 2014, all of WWE's pre-existing championships at the time received a minor update, changing the scratch logo to WWE's current logo that was originally used for the WWE Network that launched earlier that year in February.

During WrestleMania Weekend 2017, all existing NXT title belts at the time were redesigned. The new title belts were unveiled at TakeOver: Orlando that same night and given to the winners of their respective matches. Like the previous design, the plates were gold and on a black leather strap. The letter "X" again dominated the center plate with smaller letters "N" and "T" sitting on the left and right sides, respectively. On this new design, however, the letters were on an octagonal shaped plate. Above the "X" was the WWE logo, while below the "X" was a banner that read "Champion". Simple ornamentation with some silver filled in the rest of the plate. Coming in line with WWE's other championships, the new design included side plates with a removable center section that could be customized with the champion's logo; the default plates featured the WWE logo.

On the April 5, 2022, episode of NXT, reigning champion Bron Breakker debuted a new belt design; it was largely similar to the previous version (2017–2022), but the silver behind the logo was replaced by multi-colored paint (matching the NXT 2.0 colorscheme) and the letters "N" and "T" on the center plate were updated to the font style of the NXT 2.0 logo. The default side plates were also updated, replacing the WWE logo with the NXT 2.0 logo. The new title retained the black leather strap. When "NXT 2.0" went back to being called "NXT" in September, the default side plates were updated with the new NXT logo.

The NXT 2.0 version of the championship belt (2022–2024).

With NXT's move to The CW on October 1, 2024, the show got a new logo. As a result, both the men's and women's NXT championship belts received an update that same episode. They mostly have the same design as their respective previous version, but with The CW era NXT logo on the center plate and side plates, with more of a globe visible behind the logo on the center plate. The multi-colored paint from the NXT 2.0 version (2022–2024) was also removed, and the plates are now primarily silver with gold accents.

== Reigns ==
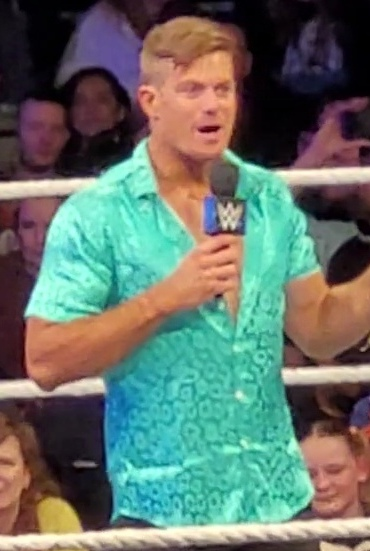
Current champion Grayson Waller

As of September 21, 2026, there have been 38 reigns among 29 different champions and four vacancies. The inaugural champion was Seth Rollins. Samoa Joe has the most reigns at three. Adam Cole's reign is the longest singular reign at 396 days (recognized as 403 days by WWE due to tape delay), while Karrion Kross' first reign is the shortest at 4 days (recognized as 3 days by WWE) as he had to relinquish the title due to a legitimate injury he suffered in winning it. Finn Bálor has the longest combined reign at 504 days. Bo Dallas holds the record as the youngest champion, winning the title two days before his 23rd birthday (although WWE recognizes it as 18 days after his 23rd birthday due to tape delay), while Samoa Joe is the oldest champion, winning the title at 42.

Grayson Waller is the current champion in his first reign. He won the title by defeating previous champion Tony D'Angelo, Cruz Montana, and Zilla Fatu in a fatal four-way match at Heatwave on August 30, 2026, in Edinburg, Texas.
