= NXT The Great American Bash (2023) =

WWE premium live event

- Promotional poster featuring Wes Lee, Tiffany Stratton, Ilja Dragunov, Carmelo Hayes, Dragon Lee, and Roxanne Perez
- Promotion: WWE
- Brand: NXT
- Date: July 30, 2023
- City: Cedar Park, Texas
- Venue: H-E-B Center at Cedar Park
- Attendance: 4,252

WWE event chronology
← Previous; Money in the Bank	Next → SummerSlam

The Great American Bash chronology
← Previous; 2022	Next → 2024

NXT major events chronology
← Previous; Battleground	Next → No Mercy

The 2023 NXT The Great American Bash was a professional wrestling premium live event (PLE) produced by WWE, held for wrestlers from the promotion's developmental brand, NXT. It was NXT's fourth annual Great American Bash, the 11th produced by WWE, and the 25th overall. The event took place on Sunday, July 30, 2023, at the H-E-B Center at Cedar Park in the Austin suburb of Cedar Park, Texas.

Unlike the previous three years, which aired as special episodes of NXT, the 2023 event was the first to be broadcast as a PLE, a term the company introduced at the start of 2022 to refer to its events airing on pay-per-view and via livestreaming. This was in turn the first Great American Bash to air on Peacock in the United States, Disney+ Hotstar in Indonesia, Disney+ in the Philippines, Binge in Australia, and the WWE Network everywhere else. Although the event returned to being a television special of NXT in 2024, it has been held as a PLE since 2025.

Seven matches were contested at the event, including one on the pre-show. In the main event, Carmelo Hayes defeated Ilja Dragunov to retain the NXT Championship. In other prominent matches, Raw's "Dirty" Dominik Mysterio defeated Wes Lee and Mustafa Ali in a triple threat match to retain the NXT North American Championship, and Tiffany Stratton defeated Thea Hail in a submission match to retain the NXT Women's Championship. The event was notable for the professional wrestling in-ring debut of Olympic Gold medallist Gable Steveson.

== Production ==
=== Background ===
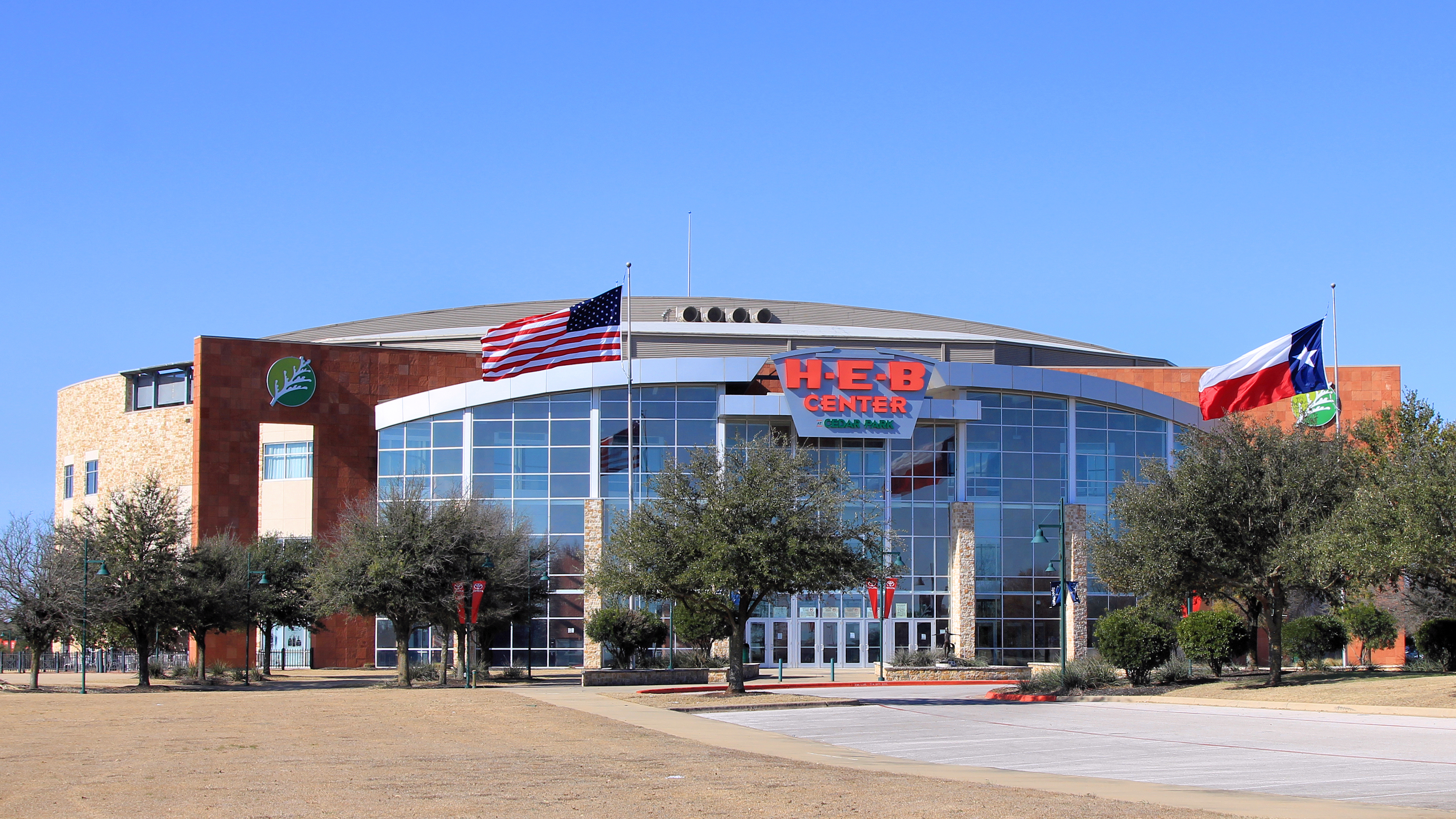
WWE's 11th Great American Bash, and fourth annual for its developmental brand, NXT, was held at the H-E-B Center at Cedar Park in the Austin suburb of Cedar Park, Texas.

The Great American Bash is a professional wrestling event established in 1985, held during the summer. Following WWE's acquisition of World Championship Wrestling (WCW) in March 2001, WWE revived The Great American Bash as its own pay-per-view (PPV) event in 2004 and it was held annually until 2009. After the 2009 event, which was truncated as The Bash, it was discontinued until it was held once more as a television special of SmackDown in 2012, which returned to using the event's full name, after which, it was again discontinued. After eight years, WWE reinstated the event in 2020, this time for WWE's developmental brand, NXT, becoming an annual television special of the NXT program.

On May 28, 2023, during Battleground, it was announced that NXT's fourth Great American Bash, the 11th produced by WWE, and 25th overall, would be held on Sunday, July 30, 2023, at the H-E-B Center at Cedar Park in the Austin suburb of Cedar Park, Texas. Instead of airing as a television special like the previous three events, the 2023 event was scheduled to be held as a premium live event (PLE), marking the first Great American Bash to broadcast on WWE's livestreaming platforms: Peacock in the United States, SonyLIV in India, Disney+ Hotstar in Indonesia, Disney+ in the Philippines, Binge in Australia, and the WWE Network everywhere else. This was subsequently the first Great American Bash to be branded as a "premium live event", a term the company introduced on January 1, 2022, to refer to its events that are available on PPV and via livestreaming.

=== Storylines ===
The event comprised seven matches, including one on the pre-show, that resulted from scripted storylines. Results were predetermined by WWE's writers on the NXT brand, while storylines were produced on WWE's weekly television program, NXT, and the supplementary online streaming show, Level Up.

At the end of NXT: Gold Rush – Night 2 on June 27, Bron Breakker went berserk in Shawn Michaels's office before storming out of the room, screaming that he had done his best in NXT and Michaels could not control him. The following week during a promo where Breakker talked about his match against Raw's Seth "Freakin" Rollins for the World Heavyweight Championship during NXT Gold Rush – Night 1, he was interrupted by Ilja Dragunov, who said that Breakker was between him and the NXT Championship. The two then brawled. On July 7, Michaels announced via Twitter that Dragunov and Breakker would face each other on the next episode, with the winner receiving a match against Carmelo Hayes for the NXT Championship at The Great American Bash. The following week, Dragunov won the match.

At the end NXT: Gold Rush – Night 2 on June 27, Tiffany Stratton defeated Thea Hail to controversially retain the NXT Women's Championship; Hail had Stratton in the Kimura lock submission, but due to a distraction by Drew Gulak and Charlie Dempsey at ringside, the referee did not see Stratton tap out. Three weeks later, Hail wanted a rematch against Stratton for the title at The Great American Bash, which Stratton accepted. Hail also wanted to add a submission match stipulation, but Stratton declined, stating that only she can add stipulations. Hail then put Stratton into a Kimura lock, and Stratton accepted the additional stipulation.

For several weeks, a series of segments showed Tony D'Angelo being arrested, with Channing "Stacks" Lorenzo doing anything to free him, while dealing with Gallus (Joe Coffey, Mark Coffey, and Wolfgang). On the July 11 episode of NXT, Stacks defeated Joe in a match. Per the pre-match stipulation, D'Angelo was freed and the charges were dropped. At a special "homecoming" celebration for D'Angelo the following week, The Family (D'Angelo and Lorenzo) challenged Gallus for the NXT Tag Team Championship at The Great American Bash, which Gallus accepted.

During a battle royal to determine the number one contender for the NXT Women's Championship on the June 6 episode of NXT, Blair Davenport showed up at ringside and called out Roxanne Perez. The two brawled at ringside, and Tatum Paxley cost Perez the match. The following week, Perez defeated Paxley, and after the match, she called out Davenport. On the July 4 episode of NXT, Davenport defeated Perez. Two weeks later, during a split screen interview, they both agreed to a rematch at The Great American Bash. The following week, it was announced that the match would be a Weapons Wild match.

During NXT: Gold Rush – Night 1 on June 20, Wes Lee defeated Tyler Bate to retain the NXT North American Championship with Mustafa Ali as the special guest referee. The following week during a backstage segment, Lee confronted Ali about how he refereed the match. Bate then showed up and told Ali that there was no telling who would have won had the match been called fairly. Later that same night, a match between Ali and Bate was scheduled for the next episode, which was won by Ali. After the match, Ali challenged Lee for the title at The Great American Bash, which was made official on July 9. However, Lee lost the title to Raw's "Dirty" Dominik Mysterio on the July 18 episode following interference from Mysterio's fellow Judgment Day stablemates. The following week, a triple threat match between Mysterio, Lee, and Ali for the title was scheduled for The Great American Bash.

On the July 25 episode of NXT, Gable Steveson had to make a decision about his career, but was interrupted by Baron Corbin, who suggested that Steveson should just not go back to NXT. Steveson answered that Corbin made his decision easier and challenged him to a match at The Great American Bash, which was later made official.

== Event ==
Other on-screen personnel
Role:	Name:
Commentators	Vic Joseph
Commentators	Booker T
Spanish commentators	Marcelo Rodríguez
Spanish commentators	Jerry Soto
Ring announcer	Alicia Taylor
Referees	Adrian Butler
Referees	Chip Danning
Referees	Dallas Irvin
Referees	Derek Sanders
Referees	Jeremy Marcus
Interviewer	McKenzie Mitchell
Pre-show panel	Megan Morant
Pre-show panel	Matt Camp
Pre-show panel	Sam Roberts

=== Pre-show ===
During the pre-show, Nathan Frazer, Dragon Lee, Yulisa León, and Valentina Feroz took on Meta Four (Noam Dar, Oro Mensah, Lash Legend, and Jakara Jackson) in an eight-person mixed tag team match. In the closing stages, Frazer delivered a springboard inverted DDT on Dar, but Jackson broke up the pin. Leon and Feroz then delivered a diving dropkick/DDT combination to Legend, but Dar broke up the pin. Mensah then delivered a spinning leg lariat to Frazer, but Dragon Lee immediately delivered a tornado DDT to Mensah. Frazer then delivered a reverse Springboard Spanish Fly to Mensah and a tope con giro to Dar, allowing Dragon Lee to deliver an Asai DDT to Mensah for the win.

=== Preliminary matches ===
The actual PLE began with Gallus (Mark Coffey and Wolfgang) (with Joe Coffey) defending the NXT Tag Team Championship against The Family (Tony D'Angelo and Channing "Stacks" Lorenzo). In the closing stages, D'Angelo delivered a spinebuster to Mark Coffey for a two-count. As Wolfgang was attempting a senton on D'Angelo, he unintentionally delivered the senton on Mark Coffey. Wolfgang then delivered a Pounce and a moonsault to Stacks for a two-count. Gallus then delivered Gallus Gate to Stacks, but D'Angelo broke up the pin. D'Angelo them delivered a powerbomb to Mark Coffey onto Wolfgang into the steel steps. D'Angelo then hit Joe Coffey with a crowbar, allowing D'Angelo and Stacks to deliver the Bada Bing to Wolfgang to become the new NXT Tag Team Champions.

In the next match, Roxanne Perez faced Blair Davenport in a Weapons Wild match. In the opening stages, as Perez was making her entrance, Davenport jumped over the barricade and attacked Perez. Perez then delivered a diving crossbody from the barricade to Davenport. As Perez was attempting a suicide dive, Davenport threw a trash can into Perez. Davenport then delivered multiple chair and golf club shots to Perez. As Davenport was attempting a chair shot to Perez, Perez blocked it and threw a chair into Davenport. Davenport then started beating Perez with a leather belt. Perez then hit Davenport with a cowbell and started throwing Davenport across the barricade. As Perez was attempting the Pop Rox, Davenport countered it into an Alabama Slam. Davenport then delivered a Falcon Arrow to Perez onto a trashcan for a two-count. Perez then delivered a knee strike into the steps, a diving splash onto a table and a Pop Rox onto a pile of chairs for the win.

Next, Gable Steveson faced Baron Corbin. In the closing stages, Steveson delivered a German suplex onto the outside and locked in the ankle lock, but Corbin escaped it and threw him into the ring post. Corbin then delivered a Fireman's carry driver and a lariat for a two-count. Steveson then threw Corbin over the announce table, but Corbin immediately delivered a flying forearm. Both men then threw themselves over the announce table as the referee reached the count of 10, forcing a double countout. After the match, Steveson and Corbin continued fighting, with both men attacking WWE Security and Steveson delivering a belly-to-back suplex to Corbin into the barricade.

Next, "Dirty" Dominik Mysterio (with Rhea Ripley) defended the NXT North American Championship against Wes Lee and Mustafa Ali. In the opening stages, Ali and Lee delivered simultaneous chops in the corner to Dominik. As both Ali and Lee were on the top rope, Dominik pushed both men to the outside. Ali and Lee then delivered Three Amigos to Dominik at the same time for a two-count. Lee then delivered a diving Meteora to Dominik, but Ali broke up the pin. As Ali was attempting a 450° splash on the apron to both Lee and Dominik, both men moved out of the way. Dominik then delivered a schoolboy pin to Lee for a two-count. Lee then delivered a suicide dive to Dominik. As Lee was attempting another suicide dive to Dominik, Ripley stood in front of Lee to prevent him, but Lee immediately delivered a tope con giro over Ripley and onto Dominik. As Lee was attempting to bring Dominik back into the ring, Ripley stopped him and delivered a Riptide to him through the table. Dominik then hit Lee with the Women's World Championship for a two-count. As Dominik was attempting the Frog Splash, Ali delivered a dropkick to Dominik and delivered the 450° splash to Lee but Ripley pulled Ali out of the ring to stop the pinfall attempt, allowing Dominik to deliver the Frog Splash to Lee to retain the title.

In the penultimate match, Tiffany Stratton faced Thea Hail (with Andre Chase and Duke Hudson) in a submission match for the NXT Women's Championship. In the opening stages, Stratton locked in the Romeo Special, but Hail reversed it into the Fujiwara armbar, but Stratton escaped. Stratton then delivered a tilt-a-whirl backbreaker and a handspring back elbow. Hail then delivered an avalanche fisherman suplex, but as Hail was attempting the springboard senton, Stratton countered it into a bodyscissors. Hail then locked in the Kimura Lock, but Stratton reached the ropes. Stratton then threw Hail into the steel steps, delivered the Prettiest Moonsault Ever and locked in the Boston Crab, but Hail refused to tap out. As Hail was attempting to reach the ropes, Stratton dragged her back into the ring and locked in a half Boston Crab. To prevent more damage to the back, cornerman Andre Chase threw in the towel, forcing the referee to call the match and thus Stratton retained the title.

=== Main event ===
In the main event, Carmelo Hayes (with Trick Williams) defended the NXT Championship against Ilja Dragunov. In the opening stages, Hayes delivered a shoulder tackle, a springboard clothesline and a pump kick for a two-count. Dragunov then delivered an enzeguiri, a german suplex and a lariat for a two-count. Dragunov then delivered a jumping kick and a German suplex for another two-count. Dragunov then delivered a ripcord forearm and a chop for a two-count. Hayes then delivered a superkick, but Dragunov immediately delivered a lariat for a two-count. Dragunov then locked in the Cobra Clutch, but Hayes countered it into a pin for a two-count. Dragunov then delivered a roundhouse kick for another two-count. As Hayes was attempting a leg lariat, Dragunov blocked it into an enzeguiri, but Hayes immediately delivered La Mistica. As Dragunov was attempting a chop, Hayes delivered a knee smash, a lariat and the springboard DDT for a nearfall. As Hayes was going to the top rope, Dragunov pushed him down and delivered a diving senton for a two-count. As Dragunov was attempting the Coast-to-Coast, Hayes countered it into a Codebreaker, but as Hayes was attempting the Nothing But Net, Dragunov countered it into a powerbomb and delivered a jumping forearm for a two-count. As Dragunov was attempting an avalanche fisherman suplex, Hayes countered it into a mid-air cutter. As Trick Williams was talking to Hayes on the outside, Dragunov delivered a Torpedo Moscow to Williams, allowing Hayes to bring Dragunov back into the ring and deliver the Nothing But Net to retain the title.

== Reception ==
Wrestling journalist Dave Meltzer of the Wrestling Observer Newsletter rated the 8 person tag team match and the Weapons Wild match 3.75 stars, the NXT Tag Team Championship bout 3 stars, the Steveson-Corbin match 1.5 stars (the lowest rated match on the card), the NXT North American title match 4 stars, the NXT Women's Championship match 3.5 stars, and the NXT Championship match 4.75 stars (the highest rated match on the card).

== Aftermath ==
Ilja Dragunov earned another match against Carmelo Hayes for the NXT Championship at No Mercy by defeating Wes Lee on the September 12 episode of NXT.

Despite the 2023 event airing as a PLE, the event returned to being a television special of NXT in 2024, and as a two-part event like in 2020. However, the event returned to being a PLE starting in 2025. Additionally, following an announcement made on January 23, 2024, this was the final Great American Bash to air on the standalone WWE Network in most areas where it was still available due to its content merging under Netflix in January 2025.

== Results ==
No.	Results	Stipulations	Times
1^{P}	Nathan Frazer, Yulisa León, Valentina Feroz, and Dragon Lee defeated The Meta-Four (Noam Dar, Jakara Jackson, Lash Legend, and Oro Mensah) by pinfall	Eight-person mixed tag team match	10:51
2	The Family (Tony D'Angelo and Channing "Stacks" Lorenzo) defeated Gallus (Wolfgang and Mark Coffey) (c) (with Joe Coffey) by pinfall	Tag team match for the NXT Tag Team Championship	8:43
3	Roxanne Perez defeated Blair Davenport by pinfall	Weapons Wild match	11:49
4	Gable Steveson vs. Baron Corbin ended in a double countout	Singles match	6:32
5	"Dirty" Dominik Mysterio (c) (with Rhea Ripley) defeated Wes Lee and Mustafa Ali by pinfall	Triple threat match for the NXT North American Championship	12:05
6	Tiffany Stratton (c) defeated Thea Hail (with Andre Chase and Duke Hudson) by technical submission (Note: Hail's cornerman, Andre Chase, threw in the towel while Stratton had Hail in a Boston Crab submission hold, awarding Stratton the win by technicality.)	Submission match for the NXT Women's Championship	11:45
7	Carmelo Hayes (c) (with Trick Williams) defeated Ilja Dragunov by pinfall	Singles match for the NXT Championship	24:07
(c) / – the champion(s) heading into the match; P / – the match was broadcast on the pre-show
