= NXT: The Great American Bash (2022) =

WWE television special

- Promotional poster featuring various NXT wrestlers
- Promotion: WWE
- Brand: NXT 2.0
- Date: July 5, 2022
- City: Orlando, Florida
- Venue: WWE Performance Center

NXT special episodes chronology
← Previous; Spring Breakin'	Next → Heatwave

The Great American Bash chronology
← Previous; 2021	Next → 2023

The 2022 NXT: The Great American Bash was a professional wrestling television special produced by WWE, held exclusively for wrestlers from the promotion's developmental brand, NXT 2.0. It was NXT's third annual Great American Bash, the 10th produced by WWE, and the 24th overall, and it aired as a special episode of the weekly series NXT 2.0 on the USA Network. It took place on July 5, 2022, at the WWE Performance Center in Orlando, Florida for a second consecutive year. Six matches were contested at the event. In the main event, Bron Breakker defeated Cameron Grimes to retain the NXT Championship.

This was the first Great American Bash held since NXT was rebranded as NXT 2.0 in September 2021, reverting it to a developmental brand for WWE, although in September 2022, the "2.0" moniker was dropped. In 2023, The Great American Bash became a premium live event (PLE) for NXT, although it returned to being a television special once more in 2024 before continuing as a PLE in 2025.

== Production ==
=== Background ===
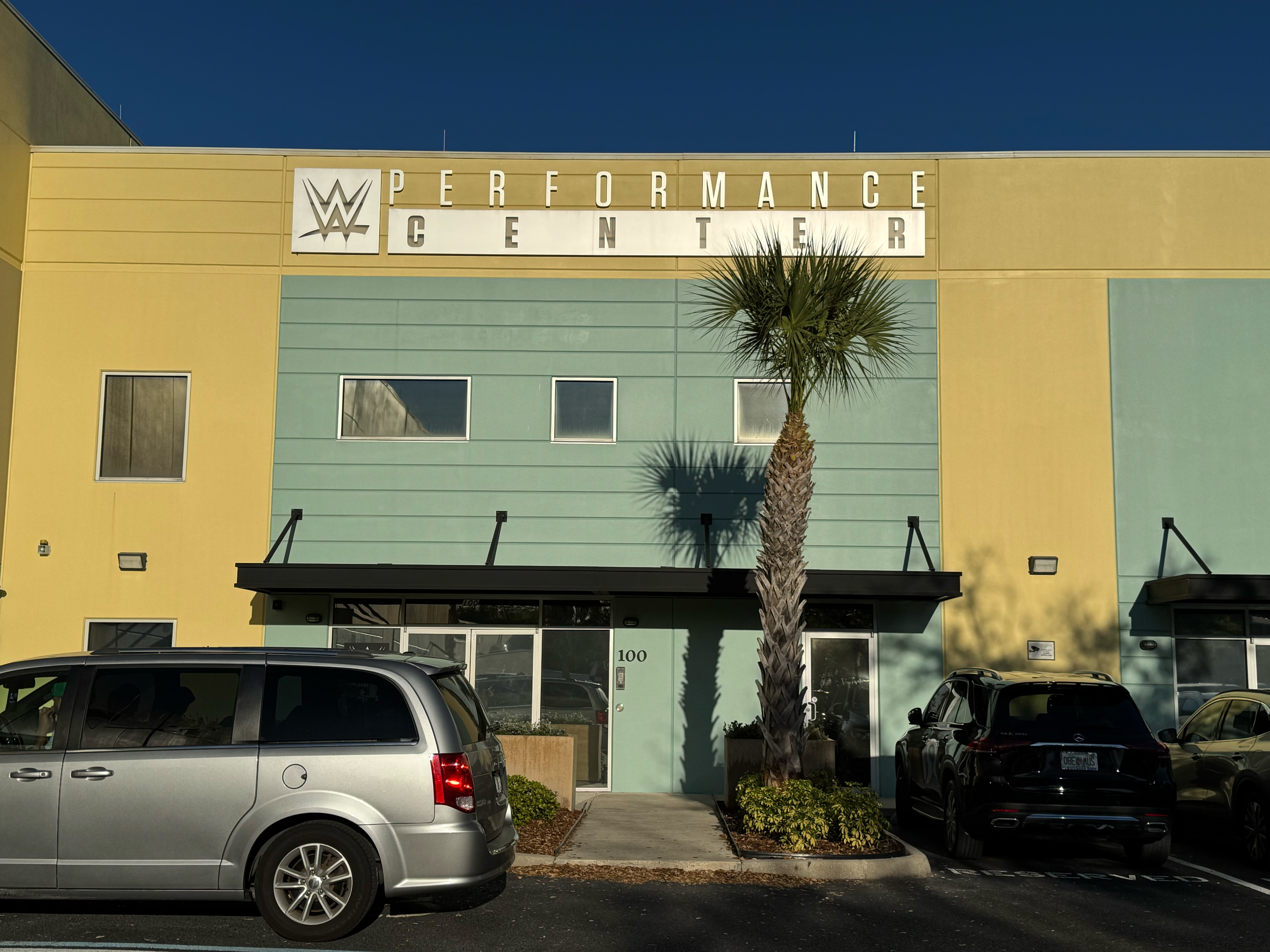
WWE's 10th Great American Bash, and third annual for its developmental brand, NXT, was held at the brand's home venue, the WWE Performance Center in Orlando, Florida for a second consecutive year.

The Great American Bash is a professional wrestling event established in 1985, held during the summer. Following WWE's acquisition of World Championship Wrestling (WCW) in March 2001, WWE revived The Great American Bash as its own pay-per-view (PPV) event in 2004 and it was held annually until 2009. After the 2009 event, which was truncated as The Bash, it was discontinued until it was held once more as a television special of SmackDown in 2012, which returned to using the event's full name, after which, it was again discontinued. After eight years, WWE reinstated the event in 2020, this time for the NXT brand, becoming an annual television special of the NXT program.

On June 4, 2022, during In Your House, it was announced that NXT's third Great American Bash, the 10th produced by WWE, and the 24th overall, would be held on July 5, 2022. It took place at the brand's home venue, the WWE Performance Center in Orlando, Florida for a second consecutive year and aired as a special episode of NXT 2.0 on the USA Network. This was the first Great American Bash held since NXT was rebranded as NXT 2.0 in September 2021, reverting it to a developmental brand.

=== Storylines ===
The card included matches that resulted from scripted storylines. Results were predetermined by WWE's writers on the NXT brand, while storylines were produced on NXT's weekly television program, NXT 2.0, and the supplementary online streaming show, Level Up.

On the June 14 episode of NXT, after Bron Breakker successfully retained the NXT Championship, Cameron Grimes interrupted. Grimes called Breakker's success a joke and stated that Breakker only got successful because of his real last name (Steiner). Grimes also stated that Breakker got better every time he stepped in the ring, but did not have Grimes's heart. Grimes then challenged Breakker for the title at The Great American Bash, and Breakker accepted.

== Aftermath ==
While the Great American Bash events from 2020 to 2022 were held as television specials of the NXT program, the 2023 event was made a premium live event, airing on WWE's livestreaming platforms.

== Results ==
No.	Results	Stipulations	Times
1	Cora Jade and Roxanne Perez defeated Toxic Attraction (Gigi Dolin and Jacy Jayne) (c) by pinfall	Tag team match for the NXT Women's Tag Team Championship	10:29
2	Trick Williams (with Carmelo Hayes) defeated Wes Lee by pinfall	Singles match	3:46
3	Tiffany Stratton defeated Wendy Choo by pinfall	Singles match	5:05
4	Carmelo Hayes (c) (with Trick Williams) defeated Grayson Waller by pinfall	Singles match for the NXT North American Championship	11:43
5	The Creed Brothers (Brutus Creed and Julius Creed) (c) defeated Diamond Mine (Damon Kemp and Roderick Strong) by pinfall	Tag team match for the NXT Tag Team Championship	12:13
6	Bron Breakker (c) defeated Cameron Grimes by pinfall	Singles match for the NXT Championship	12:34
(c) / – the champion(s) heading into the match
