= NXT: The Great American Bash (2024) =

WWE two-part television special

- Promotion: WWE
- Brand: NXT
- Date: July 30 and August 6, 2024
- City: Orlando, Florida
- Venue: WWE Performance Center

NXT special episodes chronology
| ← Previous; Spring Breakin' | Next → NXT 2300 |

The Great American Bash chronology
| ← Previous; 2023 | Next → 2025 |

The 2024 NXT: The Great American Bash was a two-part professional wrestling television special produced by WWE, held for wrestlers from the promotion's developmental brand, NXT. It was NXT's fifth annual Great American Bash, the 12th produced by WWE, and the 26th overall, and it aired as a two-part special episode of the weekly series NXT. The two-part event took place on July 30 and August 6, 2024, at NXT's home venue, the WWE Performance Center in Orlando, Florida. In lieu of NXT's normal channel, the USA Network, the two-part special aired on Syfy due to USA's coverage of the 2024 Summer Olympics.

This returned The Great American Bash to being a television special of NXT, like the events from 2020 to 2022, as the 2023 event was a premium live event (PLE), airing on WWE's livestreaming platforms. This was also the first time since 2020 to air as a two-part event. In addition to wrestlers from NXT, there were also appearances by wrestlers from WWE's Raw brand and partner promotion Total Nonstop Action Wrestling (TNA), which began a talent exchange arrangement with NXT in June 2024. This was also the third NXT: The Great American Bash held at the WWE Performance Center, after the 2021 and 2022 specials. The event returned to being a one-night PLE in 2025.

Ten matches were contested on Week 1 of the event, with four taped for future episodes of Level Up. In the televised main event, Roxanne Perez defeated Thea Hail to retain the NXT Women's Championship. In another prominent match, which was the opening bout, The Unholy Union (Alba Fyre and Isla Dawn) defeated Meta-Four (Jakara Jackson and Lash Legend) to retain the WWE Women's Tag Team Championship.

Week 2 also had 10 matches, with four taped for future episodes of Level Up. In the televised main event, Axiom and Nathan Frazer defeated MSK (Wes Lee and Zachary Wentz) to retain the NXT Tag Team Championship, leading to Lee's heel turn for the first time ever. In other prominent matches, TNA wrestler Joe Hendry defeated Joe Coffey, and Ethan Page defeated Oro Mensah to retain the NXT Championship.

== Production ==
=== Background ===
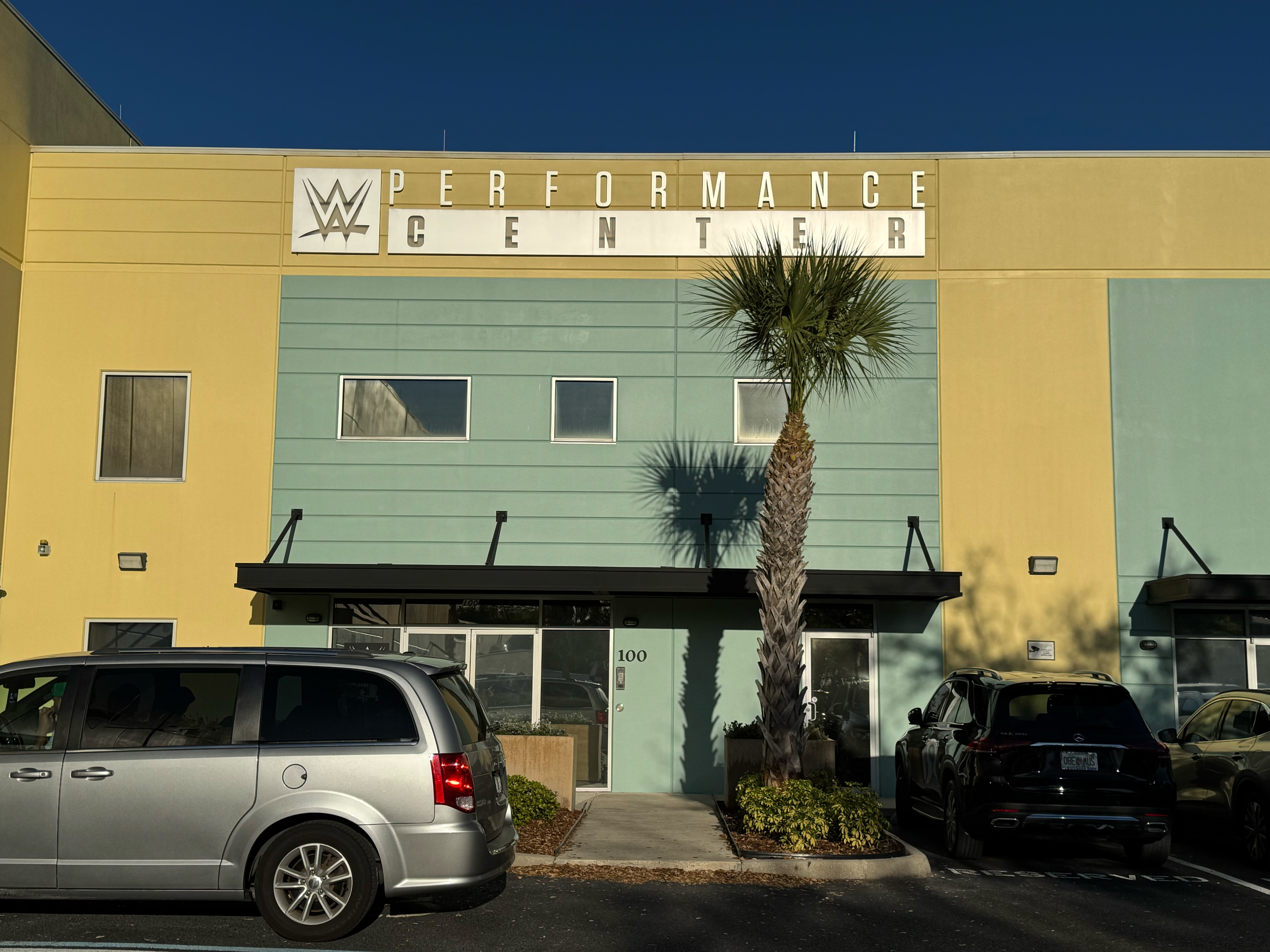
WWE's 12th Great American Bash, and fifth annual for its developmental brand, NXT, was held at the brand's home venue, the WWE Performance Center in Orlando, Florida for a third time, after 2021 and 2022.

The Great American Bash is a professional wrestling event established in 1985, held during the summer. Following WWE's acquisition of World Championship Wrestling (WCW) in March 2001, WWE revived The Great American Bash as its own pay-per-view (PPV) event in 2004 and it was held annually until 2009. After the 2009 event, which was truncated as The Bash, it was discontinued until it was held once more as a television special of SmackDown in 2012, which returned to using the event's full name, after which, it was again discontinued. After eight years, WWE reinstated the event in 2020, this time for WWE's developmental brand, NXT, becoming an annual event for the brand.

On July 7, 2024, during Heatwave, NXT's fifth Great American Bash, the 12th produced by WWE, and the 26th overall, was officially announced. Instead of being held as a premium live event (PLE) like the previous year, the 2024 event was scheduled to again be a television special of NXT, like the events from 2020 to 2022. It was originally scheduled for just August 6, but it was expanded to a two-part event, taking place on July 30 and August 6 at NXT's home venue, the WWE Performance Center in Orlando, Florida for a third time, after the 2021 and 2022 specials. In lieu of NXT's normal channel, the USA Network, the two-part special of NXT aired in the United States on Syfy due to USA's coverage of the 2024 Summer Olympics. This was also the first two-part Great American Bash since 2020, as the events from 2021 to 2023 were only one-night events.

=== Storylines ===
The event included matches that resulted from scripted storylines. Results were predetermined by WWE's writers on the NXT brand, while storylines were produced on WWE's weekly television program, NXT, and the supplementary online streaming show, Level Up.

On the July 9 episode of NXT, Chase University's Ridge Holland told fellow stablemate Thea Hail she was ready for another shot at the NXT Women's Championship, held by Roxanne Perez. The following week, Perez expressed frustration at the lack of respect towards her and said Hail did not deserve a title match. Hail interrupted and said Perez was not owed anything and vowed to take the title from her. The two brawled before Holland appeared and restrained Hail. On the July 23 episode, it was announced that Perez would defend her title against Hail on Night 1 of The Great American Bash.

On the July 9 episode of NXT, Wren Sinclair witnessed No Quarter Catch Crew (Charlie Dempsey, Myles Borne, and Tavion Heights) presumably murdering (kayfabe) fellow stablemate Damon Kemp—this was done to write Kemp off television following his release from WWE. The following week, Dempsey approached NXT Heritage Cup champion Tony D'Angelo for advice to no avail. Sinclair expressed her desire to join the Catch Crew, but Dempsey declined. On the next episode, Sinclair blackmailed Dempsey and stated that if she did not win her match that night, she would tell everyone about the Catch Crew's actions. Sinclair won her match after interference from Dempsey. Backstage later that night, D'Angelo said he respected the Catch Crew and agreed to put his Cup on the line against Heights during Night 1 of The Great American Bash.

On the July 23 episode of NXT, Meta-Four's Jakara Jackson and Lash Legend defeated Karmen Petrovic and Sol Ruca. After the match, they challenged Raw's The Unholy Union (Alba Fyre and Isla Dawn) to a match for the WWE Women's Tag Team Championship on Night 1 of The Great American Bash. Fyre and Dawn accepted their challenge via X and the match was made official.

In June 2024, Joe Hendry from Total Nonstop Action Wrestling (TNA) began making appearances in NXT via a partnership between WWE and TNA. On the July 23 episode of NXT, it was announced that Hendry would perform a live in-ring concert on Night 1 of The Great American Bash. On Night 1, Hendry sang a song mocking Gallus (Joe Coffey, Mark Coffey and Wolfgang), who had been feuding with Hendry since his debut in NXT. Gallus interrupted the concert and attacked Hendry, who got the upper hand. Hendry later challenged Joe to a match on Night 2 of The Great American Bash, which was made official.

In May 2024, Meta-Four's Noam Dar and Oro Mensah were attacked by an unknown assailant, later revealed to be the debuting Ethan Page. On the June 18 episode of NXT, Page competed in a 25-man battle royal to determine the #1 contender for the NXT Championship at Heatwave, but Mensah attacked him just seconds into the match and Page was never officially eliminated. Page used this to his advantage to work his way into the title match at Heatwave, which he won to become champion. On the July 16 episode of NXT, Mensah attacked Page after the latter's successful title defense and pinned him. The following week, an increasingly manic Page argued that the pin was not official since the referee was not present, only for Mensah to pin Page again with a referee present. Later that night, Page demanded NXT General Manager Ava to give him a match against Mensah with his title on the line. Ava announced that a contract signing would take place the following week, with the title match scheduled for Night 2 of The Great American Bash.

On the July 16 episode of NXT, Lola Vice defeated Jacy Jayne, only to be attacked by Jayne and Fatal Influence teammates, Jazmyn Nyx and Fallon Henley, after the match. However, Karmen Petrovic and Sol Ruca, who had been feuding with the three women, came out to save Vice. On July 27 in a video on X, Fatal Influence expressed frustration at not earning a WWE Women's Tag Team Championship match and decided that they were going to take matters into their own hands. After several back and forth posts on X, NXT General Manager Ava scheduled a six-woman tag team match between the two teams for Night 1 of The Great American Bash.

On the July 16 episode of NXT, Tatum Paxley asked NXT Women's North American Champion Kelani Jordan if she wanted to play dolls with her, which Jordan declined, saying they are too old to play with dolls. After Jordan walked away, Paxley unveiled another doll reminiscent of Jordan. Two weeks later, Paxley again asked Jordan if she wanted to play with her, but Jordan declined. Paxley then proposed to play with Jordan's title instead. It was later announced that Jordan would defend her title against Paxley on Night 2 of The Great American Bash.

After losing the NXT Championship at Heatwave, Trick Williams approached Raw's Pete Dunne for advice, only for Dunne to tell Williams to "figure it out." One week later, Williams defeated Cedric Alexander, but Dunne attacked him after the match. On the next episode, Williams challenged Dunne to a match on Night 2 of The Great American Bash, which was made official.

On the July 9 episode of NXT, Wes Lee addressed failing to regain the NXT North American Championship at Heatwave, seemingly announcing that he would be stepping away from NXT, but was interrupted by his former Rascalz stablemates Trey Miguel and Zachary Wentz from TNA. Miguel and Wentz, formerly known as Nash Carter in NXT, convinced Lee to reunite with them. Two weeks later, The Rascalz defeated Je'Von Evans and NXT Tag Team Champions Axiom and Nathan Frazer in a six-man tag team match after Wentz pinned Axiom. On the next episode, the Rascalz recounted how Lee and Wentz, once again using their former tag team name, MSK, never lost the title in the first place and set their sights on reclaiming it. It was later announced that MSK would challenge Axiom and Frazer for the title on Night 2 of The Great American Bash.

== Aftermath ==
On the following episode of NXT, NXT Women's North American Champion Kelani Jordan was at ringside for a match between Tatum Paxley and Lola Vice, but was attacked by Wendy Choo from behind. Choo subsequently declared her intentions for the title, and the match was subsequently scheduled for No Mercy.

Also on NXT, Wes Lee explained his attack on Zachary Wentz, stating that Wentz abandoned him and went to TNA. Lee challenged Wentz to a match for No Mercy. The following week, Lee took part in a triple threat match to determine the number one contender for the NXT Championship at No Mercy, which was won by Joe Hendry. After the match, Wentz attacked Lee and they had to be separated by security. On the August 27 episode, a match between Wentz and Lee was made official for No Mercy.

Although the 2024 event was held as a television special of NXT, the 2025 event returned to being a premium live event.

== Results ==
Week 1 (July 30)
| No. | Results | Stipulations | Times |
|---|---|---|---|
| 1^{D} | Tatum Paxley defeated Tyra Mae Steele by pinfall | Singles match (Note: This match was taped for the August 2, 2024, episode of NXT Level Up.) | 4:35 |
| 2^{D} | Riley Osborne defeated Shiloh Hill by pinfall | Singles match | 5:36 |
| 3^{D} | Malik Blade (with Edris Enofé) defeated Bronco Nima (with Lucien Price) by pinfall | Singles match | 5:47 |
| 4^{D} | Wendy Choo defeated Lainey Reid by submission | Singles match (Note: This match was taped for the August 9, 2024, episode of NXT Level Up.) | 5:04 |
| 5 | The Unholy Union (Alba Fyre and Isla Dawn) (c) defeated Meta-Four (Jakara Jackson and Lash Legend) (with Oro Mensah) by pinfall | Tag team match for the WWE Women's Tag Team Championship | 9:55 |
| 6 | Tony D'Angelo (c) (with Channing "Stacks" Lorenzo, Luca Crusifino, and Adriana Rizzo) defeated Tavion Heights (with Charlie Dempsey and Myles Borne) 2–1 | British Rounds Rules for the NXT Heritage Cup | 8:32 |
| 7 | Cedric Alexander defeated Brooks Jensen by pinfall | Singles match | 5:01 |
| 8 | Jaida Parker defeated Kendal Grey (with Carlee Bright) by pinfall | Singles match | 4:03 |
| 9 | The Fatal Influence (Fallon Henley, Jacy Jayne, and Jazmyn Nyx) defeated Karmen Petrovic, Lola Vice, and Sol Ruca by pinfall | Six-woman tag team match | 12:57 |
| 10 | Roxanne Perez (c) defeated Thea Hail (with Andre Chase, Duke Hudson, Ridge Holland, and Riley Osborne) by pinfall | Singles match for the NXT Women's Championship | 11:21 |
(c) / – the champion(s) heading into the match; D / – this was a dark match

Week 2 (August 6)
| No. | Results | Stipulations | Times |
|---|---|---|---|
| 1^{D} | Edris Enofé (with Malik Blade) defeated Kale Dixon by pinfall | Singles match | 7:42 |
| 2^{D} | Mark Coffey defeated Cutler James by pinfall | Singles match (Note: This match was taped for the August 16, 2024, episode of NXT Level Up.) | 6:51 |
| 3^{D} | Dante Chen defeated Keanu Carver by pinfall | Singles match | 4:45 |
| 4^{D} | Adriana Rizzo (with Channing "Stacks" Lorenzo and Luca Crusifino) defeated Izzi Dame by pinfall | Singles match | 4:49 |
| 5 | Pete Dunne defeated Trick Williams by pinfall | Singles match | 12:59 |
| 6 | Kelani Jordan (c) defeated Tatum Paxley by pinfall | Singles match for the NXT Women's North American Championship | 10:03 |
| 7 | Ethan Page (c) defeated Oro Mensah (with Jakara Jackson and Lash Legend) by pinfall | Singles match for the NXT Championship | 9:10 |
| 8 | Joe Hendry defeated Joe Coffey (with Mark Coffey and Wolfgang) by pinfall | Singles match | 8:12 |
| 9 | Wren Sinclair (with Charlie Dempsey and Myles Borne) defeated Kendal Grey (with Carlee Bright) by pinfall | Singles match Since Sinclar won, she joined No Quarter Catch Crew, and Charlie Dempsey earned a match for the NXT Heritage Cup. | 4:15 |
| 10 | Axiom and Nathan Frazer (c) defeated MSK (Wes Lee and Zachary Wentz) (with Trey Miguel) by pinfall | Tag team match for the NXT Tag Team Championship | 10:31 |
(c) / – the champion(s) heading into the match; D / – this was a dark match
