= NXT The Great American Bash (2025) =

WWE premium live event

- Promotional poster featuring Jordynne Grace, Trick Williams, Oba Femi, Jacy Jayne, and Je'Von Evans
- Promotion: WWE
- Brand: NXT
- Date: July 12, 2025
- City: Atlanta, Georgia
- Venue: Center Stage
- Attendance: 768

WWE event chronology
← Previous; Night of Champions	Next → Saturday Night's Main Event XL

The Great American Bash chronology
← Previous; 2024	Next → 2026

NXT major events chronology
← Previous; Battleground	Next → Heatwave

The 2025 NXT The Great American Bash, also promoted as NXT The Great American Bash: Atlanta, was a professional wrestling premium live event (PLE) produced by WWE, held for wrestlers from the promotion's developmental brand, NXT. It was NXT's fourth annual Great American Bash, the 13th produced by WWE, and the 27th overall. The event took place on Saturday, July 12, 2025, at Center Stage in Atlanta, Georgia. It had a special start time of 3:00 p.m. Eastern Time, going head-to-head against All In, the biggest annual pay-per-view (PPV) event produced by rival company All Elite Wrestling.

This was the second Great American Bash to be held in the U.S. state of Georgia, after 1992. This also returned The Great American Bash to a one-night PLE since 2023, as the 2024 event was a two-part television special of NXT. It was also the first Great American Bash to broadcast on Abema in Japan and Netflix in most other international markets following the WWE Network's merger under those services in October 2023 and January 2025 in those respective areas, and it would also be the last on the WWE Network in any country as the last few countries that were still on the service due to pre-existing contracts merged under Netflix on April 1, 2026. It was also the final Great American Bash to air on Disney+ in the Philippines before it too merged under Netflix on January 1, 2026, as well as the last to air on Peacock in the United States, as The CW acquired the rights to broadcast NXT's PLEs in April 2026.

Five matches were contested at the event. While primarily held for NXT, this was the first Great American Bash to feature a wrestler from WWE's partner Japanese promotion, Pro Wrestling Noah. In the main event, Jordynne Grace and Blake Monroe defeated Fatal Influence (Jacy Jayne and Fallon Henley), which was Monroe's televised WWE in-ring debut. In other prominent matchs, Oba Femi defeated Noah's Yoshiki Inamura to retain the NXT Championship and Ethan Page defeated Ricky Saints in a Falls Count Anywhere match to retain the NXT North American Championship.

== Production ==
=== Background ===
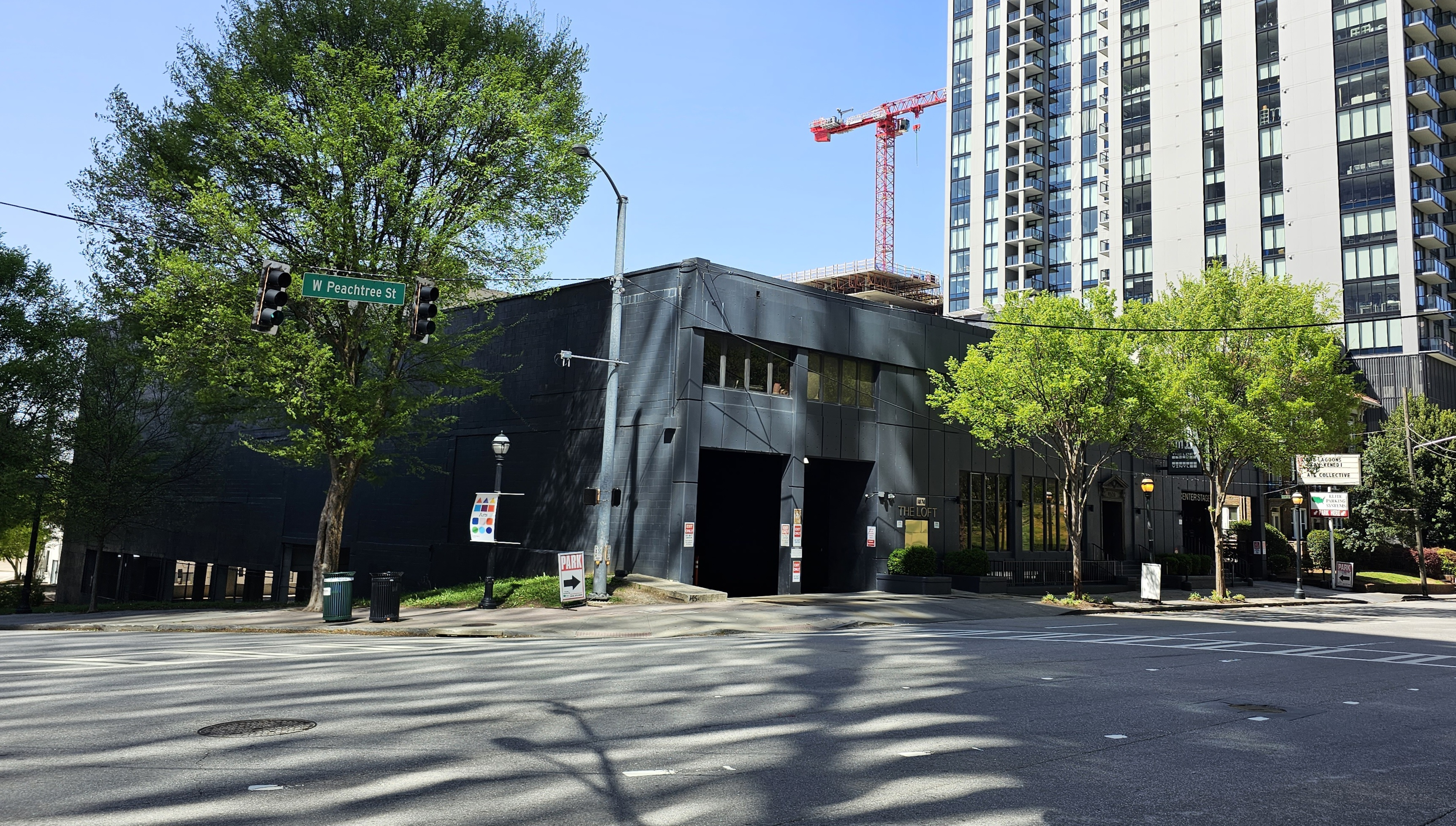
WWE's 13th Great American Bash, and sixth annual for its developmental brand, NXT, was held at Center Stage in Atlanta, Georgia.

The Great American Bash is a professional wrestling event established in 1985, held during the summer. Following WWE's acquisition of World Championship Wrestling (WCW) in March 2001, WWE revived The Great American Bash as its own pay-per-view (PPV) event in 2004 and it was held annually until 2009. After the 2009 event, which was truncated as The Bash, it was discontinued until it was held once more as a television special of SmackDown in 2012, which returned to using the event's full name, after which, it was again discontinued. After eight years, WWE reinstated the event in 2020, this time for WWE's developmental brand, NXT, becoming an annual event for the brand.

After the 2024 event was held as a two-part television special of NXT, on May 27, 2025, it was announced that NXT's sixth Great American Bash, the 13th produced by WWE, and the 27th overall, would return as a one-night premium live event (PLE) on Saturday, July 12, 2025, at Center Stage in Atlanta, Georgia. The event was in turn promoted as NXT The Great American Bash: Atlanta and marked NXT's second Great American Bash to be held as a PLE, after the 2023 event. Beginning with Halloween Havoc in 2024, all major NXT events were branded solely with the WWE logo instead of the NXT logo; The Great American Bash, however, used the NXT logo in addition to the WWE logo for aesthetic purposes. The event had a special start time of 3:00 p.m. Eastern Time, putting it head-to-head against All In, the biggest annual PPV event produced by rival company All Elite Wrestling (AEW).

=== Broadcast outlets ===
The PLE was broadcast on WWE's livestreaming platforms. These included Peacock in the United States, SuperSport in Sub-Saharan Africa, Disney+ in the Philippines, Abema in Japan, Netflix in most other international markets, and the WWE Network in a select few countries that had not yet transferred to Netflix due to pre-existing contracts. This marked the first Great American Bash to livestream on Abema and Netflix, following the WWE Network's merger under those services in October 2023 and January 2025, respectively.

=== Storylines ===
The event included five matches that resulted from scripted storylines. Results were predetermined by WWE's writers on the NXT brand, while storylines were produced on WWE's weekly television program, NXT.

On the May 20 episode of NXT, Jasper Troy attacked NXT Champion Oba Femi, which led to a title match on the June 10 episode, where Femi retained the championship. The following week, Pro Wrestling Noah's Yoshiki Inamura stated he would be coming after Femi's championship, and on the June 24 episode, Femi said he wanted more competition and demanded an opponent. Inamura answered the challenge and set his sights on the title. After the confrontation, Troy attacked Inamura, before staring down Femi, making it clear that he would go after his championship once again. Later that night, a match between Inamura and Troy was scheduled for the July 1 episode, where the winner would challenge Femi for the title at The Great American Bash. The match was won by Inamura.

On the May 27 episode of NXT, Jacy Jayne won the NXT Women's Championship. The following week, several women interrupted Jayne's celebration, each discussing why they deserved a title match, which included the debuting Blake Monroe (formerly known as Mariah May in AEW). On the June 17 episode, Monroe officially signed her NXT contract, only to be interrupted by Jayne and her Fatal Influence stablemates, Fallon Henley and Jazmyn Nyx. They took issue with not having a celebration for Jayne's victory. After some exchange of words, Monroe slapped Jayne, leading to a brawl, which ended with Henley and Jayne slamming Monroe through a table. The next week, Jordynne Grace won a match to become the number one contender for the title at Evolution, which would take place the day after The Great American Bash, and on the following episode, Grace spoke about her victory and vowed to walk out of Evolution as the champion, only to be interrupted by Fatal Influence, who mocked Grace and Monroe. After some exchange of words, Jayne tried to attack Grace, who fought back but was outnumbered by Fatal Influence. Monroe then came in to save Grace. Afterwards, NXT General Manager Ava announced that a tag team match pitting Monroe and Grace against Henley and Jayne would take place at The Great American Bash, which would mark Monroe's televised debut match in WWE.

At Battleground, Trick Williams defeated Joe Hendry from partner promotion Total Nonstop Action Wrestling (TNA) to win the TNA World Championship, becoming the first WWE-contracted wrestler to hold a TNA title. On the June 3 episode of NXT, Williams successfully defended the championship against TNA's Mike Santana. On the June 26 episode of TNA Impact!, TNA Director of Authority Santino Marella announced that Hendry would have his rematch for the TNA World Championship at TNA's Slammiversary, however, later that night, Santana demanded to be added to the match, as the event would take place in his home state of New York, which was subsequently made official. On the July 1 episode of NXT, it was announced that the contract signing for the match would take place at The Great American Bash.

Since May, Tatum Paxley became depressed after losing her friends, Gigi Dolin and Shotzi. During this time, NXT Women's North American Champion Sol Ruca and her partner Zaria tried to approach Paxley, while The Culling's Izzi Dame also tried to become close to Paxley. On the June 17 episode of NXT, Paxley accidentally cost Zaria her qualifying match against Dame at the Evolution Eliminator Tournament for an NXT Women's Championship match at Evolution, which infuriated Zaria. The following week, Paxley was in Dame's corner during the finals of the tournament, and after she interfered, Zaria and Ruca came out, leaving Paxley with them. The following week, Dame and Paxley defeated Ruca and Zaria in a tag team match, with Dame pinning Ruca. Later that night, NXT General Manager Ava announced that Ruca would defend her championship against Dame at The Great American Bash.

At Stand & Deliver, Ricky Saints successfully defended the NXT North American Championship against Ethan Page. Their rivalry continued after the event, and on the May 27 episode of NXT, Page defeated Saints to win the championship after Page injured Saints's throat. Two weeks later, Saints returned and attacked Page after his successful title defense, and on the July 1 episode, Page proposed for Saints to face Evolve's The Vanity Project (Brad Baylor, Ricky Smokes, and Jackson Drake), whom Page made an alliance with, in a Vanity Project gauntlet match, where if Saints won, he would earn a rematch for the title, with Saints proposing that if he won, he could choose the stipulation for the match. NXT General Manager Ava subsequently agreed. The match took place the following week, which Saints won, scheduling a match between Saints and Page for the title at The Great American Bash. Saints subsequently chose the stipulation to be a Falls Count Anywhere match.

On the June 17 episode of NXT, Je'Von Evans praised Jasper Troy for his performance in his NXT Championship match he had the previous week, stating that Troy's time would come, but not before his time, with Troy telling Evans to get out of his face. The following week, Troy attacked Evans after the latter's match, with Evans doing the same to Troy on the July 1 episode. The following week, Troy attacked Evans twice backstage, and later that night, both men brawled. It was subsequently announced that they would face each other at The Great American Bash.

== Event ==
Other on-screen personnel
Role:	Name:
Commentators	Vic Joseph
Commentators	Corey Graves
Commentators	Booker T
Spanish commentators	Marcelo Rodríguez
Spanish commentators	Jerry Soto
Ring announcer	Mike Rome
Referees	Adrian Butler
Referees	Chip Danning
Referees	Dallas Irvin
Referees	Derek Sanders
Referees	Felix Fernandez
Interviewers	Kelly Kincaid
Interviewers	Sarah Schreiber
Interviewers	Blake Howard
Pre-show panel	Megan Morant
Pre-show panel	Sam Roberts

=== Preliminary matches ===
The PLE began with Jasper Troy taking on Je'Von Evans. During the match, Evans performed a Frog Splash on Troy for a nearfall. In the end, Evans countered a Black Hole attempt by Troy into a roll-up to win the match.

The second match saw Sol Ruca defend the NXT Women's North American Championship against Izzi Dame. Before the match, Zaria and Tatum Paxley brawled, allowing Dame to perform a powerbomb on Ruca, who placed her foot on the rope to void the pin. Ruca performed a Spear on Dame, but Paxley placed Dame's foot on the rope before being taken out by Zaria. Ruca then performed the Sol Snatcher on Dame to retain the title.

The third match was Ethan Page defending the NXT North American Championship against Ricky Saints in a Falls Count Anywhere match. Throughout the match, Page and Saints fought all over the arena and used different weapons. Jasper Troy performed a Black Hole Slam on Saints. Saints performed a DDT on Page onto the stage for a nearfall. Page performed Ego's Edge on Saints through tables and pinned him to retain the title.

Up next was the TNA Slammiversary contract signing between Mike Santana, Joe Hendry, and TNA World Champion Trick Williams. After the participants cut promos on who would walk out the champion, Santana and Hendry sent Williams through the announce table. Afterwards, Williams was attacked by DarkState.

In the penultimate match, Oba Femi defended the NXT Championship against Yoshiki Inamura (accompanied by Josh Briggs). During the match, Inamura attempted a Frog Splash on Femi, who recovered and sent Inamura into the referee. Briggs then struck Femi with the NXT title belt and Inamura later performed a Frog Splash on Femi, but the referee was still incapacitated. Inamura performed a Blue Thunder Bomb on Femi for a nearfall. In the end, Femi performed Fall from Grace on Inamura to retain the title.

Before the main event, NXT General Manager Ava told Trick Williams that he would team with Joe Hendry and Mike Santana against DarkState on the following episode of NXT.

=== Main event ===
In the main event, Jordynne Grace and Blake Monroe took on Fatal Influence (Jacy Jayne and Fallon Henley, accompanied by Jazmyn Nyx). In the climax, TNA Knockouts Champion Masha Slamovich attacked Nyx before Jayne and Henley performed a double-team move on Monroe, which was broken up by Grace. Monroe kicked out of a pinning attempt by Jayne, and while Grace laid out Henley outside the ring, Monroe performed a Sweeping DDT on Jayne and pinned her to win the match.

== Aftermath ==
In continuing WWE's near worldwide transition to Netflix, this would be the final Great American Bash to air on Disney+ in the Philippines before moving to Netflix on January 1, 2026. Throughout 2025, many of the select few countries that were still on the WWE Network due to pre-existing contracts gradually merged to Netflix with nearly all international markets on Netflix by January 1, 2026. The last few remaining countries that were still on the WWE Network merged under Netflix on April 1, 2026, making this 2025 event the last Great American Bash to air on the WWE Network in any country. Additionally, this was the final Great American Bash to air on Peacock in the United States, as The CW acquired the rights to broadcast NXT's PLEs in April 2026.

== Results ==
No.	Results	Stipulations	Times
1	Je'Von Evans defeated Jasper Troy by pinfall	Singles match	13:37
2	Sol Ruca (c) (with Zaria) defeated Izzi Dame (with Tatum Paxley) by pinfall	Singles match for the NXT Women's North American Championship	11:43
3	Ethan Page (c) defeated Ricky Saints by pinfall	Falls Count Anywhere match for the NXT North American Championship	14:46
4	Oba Femi (c) defeated Yoshiki Inamura (with Josh Briggs) by pinfall	Singles match for the NXT Championship	13:18
5	Jordynne Grace and Blake Monroe defeated Fatal Influence (Jacy Jayne and Fallon Henley) (with Jazmyn Nyx) by pinfall	Tag team match	16:31
(c) / – the champion(s) heading into the match
