= List of NXT North American Champions =

The NXT North American Championship is a professional wrestling championship created and promoted by the American promotion WWE. It is defended as the secondary men's championship of the developmental brand, NXT. Jackson Drake is the current champion in his first reign. He won the title by defeating Myles Borne at Heatwave on August 30, 2026, in Edinburg, Texas.

As of November 7, 2026, there have been 28 reigns between 24 champions and two vacancies. The inaugural champion was Adam Cole. Johnny Gargano has the most reigns at three. Oba Femi and Ethan Page are tied for the longest reign at 273 days, although WWE officially recognizes Femi held it for 272 days, making Page the official longest-reigning champion, while Trick Williams' reign is the shortest reign at 3 days. Carmelo Hayes, Ethan Page and Oba Femi share the longest combined reign at 273 days across two reigns, one reign and one reign respectively. Jackson Drake is the youngest champion, winning the title at 23 years old, while Shawn Spears is the oldest, winning the title at 44.

== Title history ==
Key
No.	Overall reign number
Reign	Reign number for the specific champion
Days	Number of days held
Days recog.	Number of days held recognized by the promotion
+	Current reign is changing daily

No.	Champion	Championship change			Reign statistics			Notes	Ref.
No.	Champion	Date	Event	Location	Reign	Days	Days recog.	Notes	Ref.
WWE: NXT
1	Adam Cole	April 7, 2018	TakeOver: New Orleans	New Orleans, LA	1	133	132	Defeated EC3, Killian Dain, Lars Sullivan, Ricochet, and Velveteen Dream in a six-man ladder match to become the inaugural champion.	
2	Ricochet	August 18, 2018	TakeOver: Brooklyn 4	Brooklyn, NY	1	161	161		
3	Johnny Gargano	January 26, 2019	TakeOver: Phoenix	Phoenix, AZ	1	4	25	WWE recognizes Gargano's reign as ending on February 20, 2019, when the following episode aired on tape delay.	
4	Velveteen Dream	January 30, 2019	NXT	Winter Park, FL	1	231	209	WWE taped two endings for the match, one with Gargano retaining and the other with Dream winning. The latter was revealed as the true result when the episode aired on tape delay on February 20, the date WWE recognizes for Dream's reign.	
5	Roderick Strong	September 18, 2019	NXT	Winter Park, FL	1	126	126		
6	Keith Lee	January 22, 2020	NXT	Winter Park, FL	1	175	181	WWE recognizes Lee's reign as ending on July 22, 2020, when the episode in which he vacated the title aired on tape delay.	
—	Vacated	July 15, 2020	NXT	Winter Park, FL	—	—	—	Keith Lee voluntarily relinquished the title two weeks after winning the NXT Championship in order to focus on defending the latter. This episode aired on tape delay on July 22, 2020.	
7	Damian Priest	August 22, 2020	TakeOver XXX	Winter Park, FL	1	67	67	Defeated Bronson Reed, Cameron Grimes, Johnny Gargano, and Velveteen Dream in a five-man ladder match to win the vacant title.	
8	Johnny Gargano	October 28, 2020	NXT: Halloween Havoc	Orlando, FL	2	14	14	This was a Devil's Playground match.	
9	Leon Ruff	November 11, 2020	NXT	Orlando, FL	1	25	25		
10	Johnny Gargano	December 6, 2020	TakeOver: WarGames	Orlando, FL	3	163	163	This was a triple threat match, also involving Damian Priest.	
11	Bronson Reed	May 18, 2021	NXT	Orlando, FL	1	42	41	This was a Steel Cage match.	
12	Isaiah "Swerve" Scott	June 29, 2021	NXT	Orlando, FL	1	105	104		
13	Carmelo Hayes	October 12, 2021	NXT	Orlando, FL	1	172	171	This was Hayes' Breakout Tournament contract cash-in match. At NXT: New Year's Evil on January 4, 2022, Hayes defeated Roderick Strong to unify the NXT Cruiserweight Championship into the NXT North American Championship.	
14	Cameron Grimes	April 2, 2022	Stand & Deliver	Dallas, TX	1	63	63	This was a five-man ladder match, also involving Santos Escobar, Solo Sikoa, and Grayson Waller.	
15	Carmelo Hayes	June 4, 2022	In Your House	Orlando, FL	2	101	101		
16	Solo Sikoa	September 13, 2022	NXT 2.0: One Year Anniversary Show	Orlando, FL	1	7	6	Sikoa replaced Wes Lee after Lee was injured by Carmelo Hayes and Trick Williams.	
—	Vacated	September 20, 2022	NXT	Orlando, FL	—	—	—	Shawn Michaels ordered Solo Sikoa to vacate the title as he was not originally scheduled to be in the match in which he won the title. It is unknown when the segment was taped.	
17	Wes Lee	October 22, 2022	Halloween Havoc	Orlando, FL	1	269	269	Defeated Carmelo Hayes, Von Wagner, Nathan Frazer, and Oro Mensah in a five-man ladder match for the vacant title.	
18	Dominik Mysterio	July 18, 2023	NXT	Orlando, FL	1	74	73		
19	Trick Williams	September 30, 2023	No Mercy	Bakersfield, CA	1	3	3	Dragon Lee was the special guest referee.	
20	Dominik Mysterio	October 3, 2023	NXT	Orlando, FL	2	67	66	Had Mysterio lost, he would've been forced to leave The Judgment Day.	
21	Dragon Lee	December 9, 2023	Deadline	Bridgeport, CT	1	31	31		
22	Oba Femi	January 9, 2024	NXT	Orlando, FL	1	273	272	This was Femi's Breakout Tournament contract cash-in match.	
23	Tony D'Angelo	October 8, 2024	NXT	Chesterfield, MO	1	147	147		
24	Shawn Spears	March 4, 2025	NXT	Orlando, FL	1	28	27		
25	Ricky Saints	April 1, 2025	NXT	Orlando, FL	1	56	55		
26	Ethan Page	May 27, 2025	NXT	Orlando, FL	1	273	273		
27	Myles Borne	February 24, 2026	NXT	Orlando, FL	1	187	186		
28	Jackson Drake	August 30, 2026	Heatwave	Edinburg, TX	1	69+	69+		

== Combined reigns ==
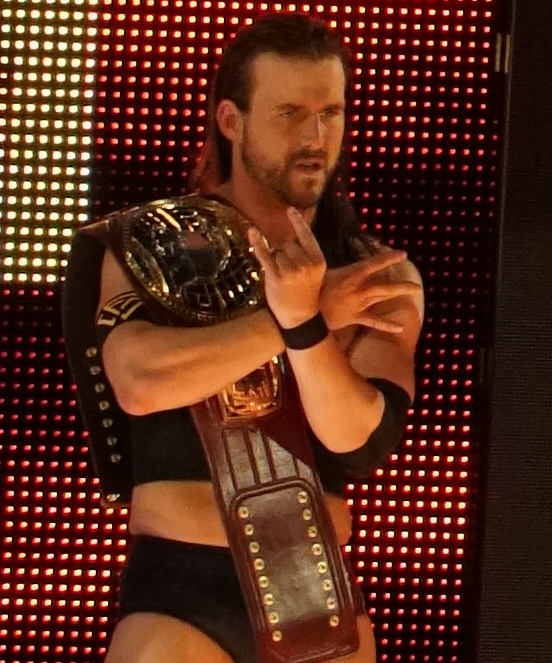
Inaugural champion Adam Cole

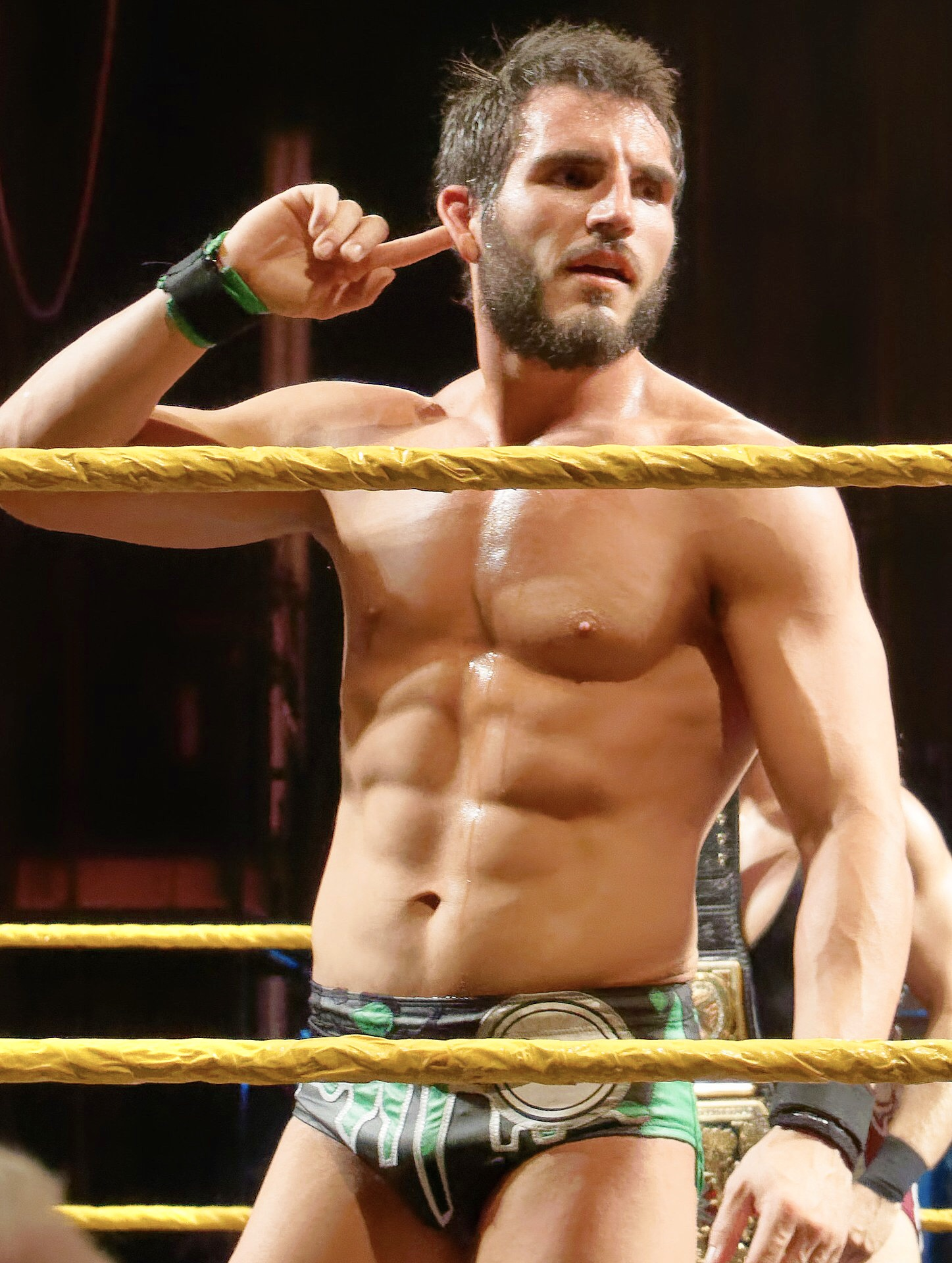
Johnny Gargano holds the record for most reigns with 3.

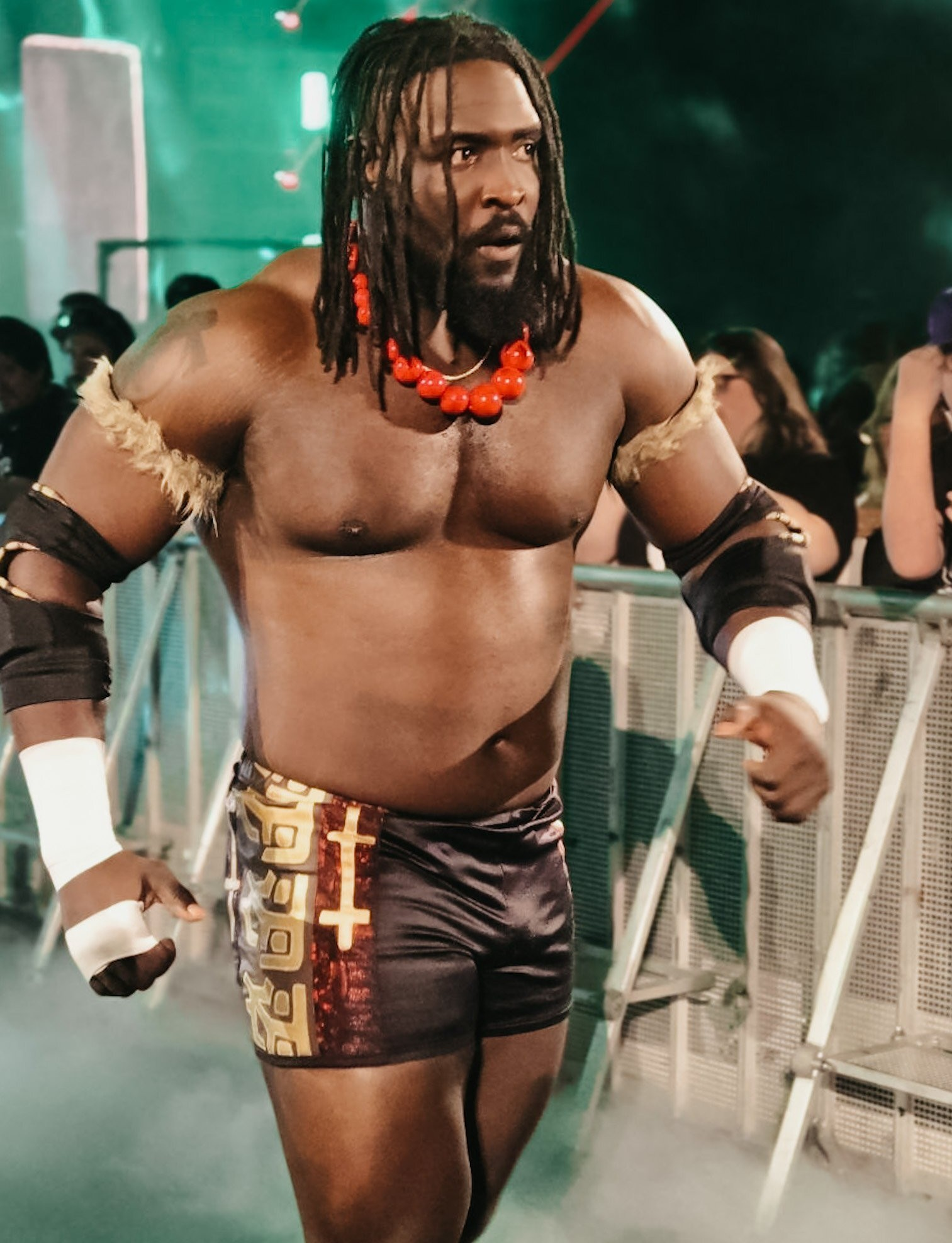
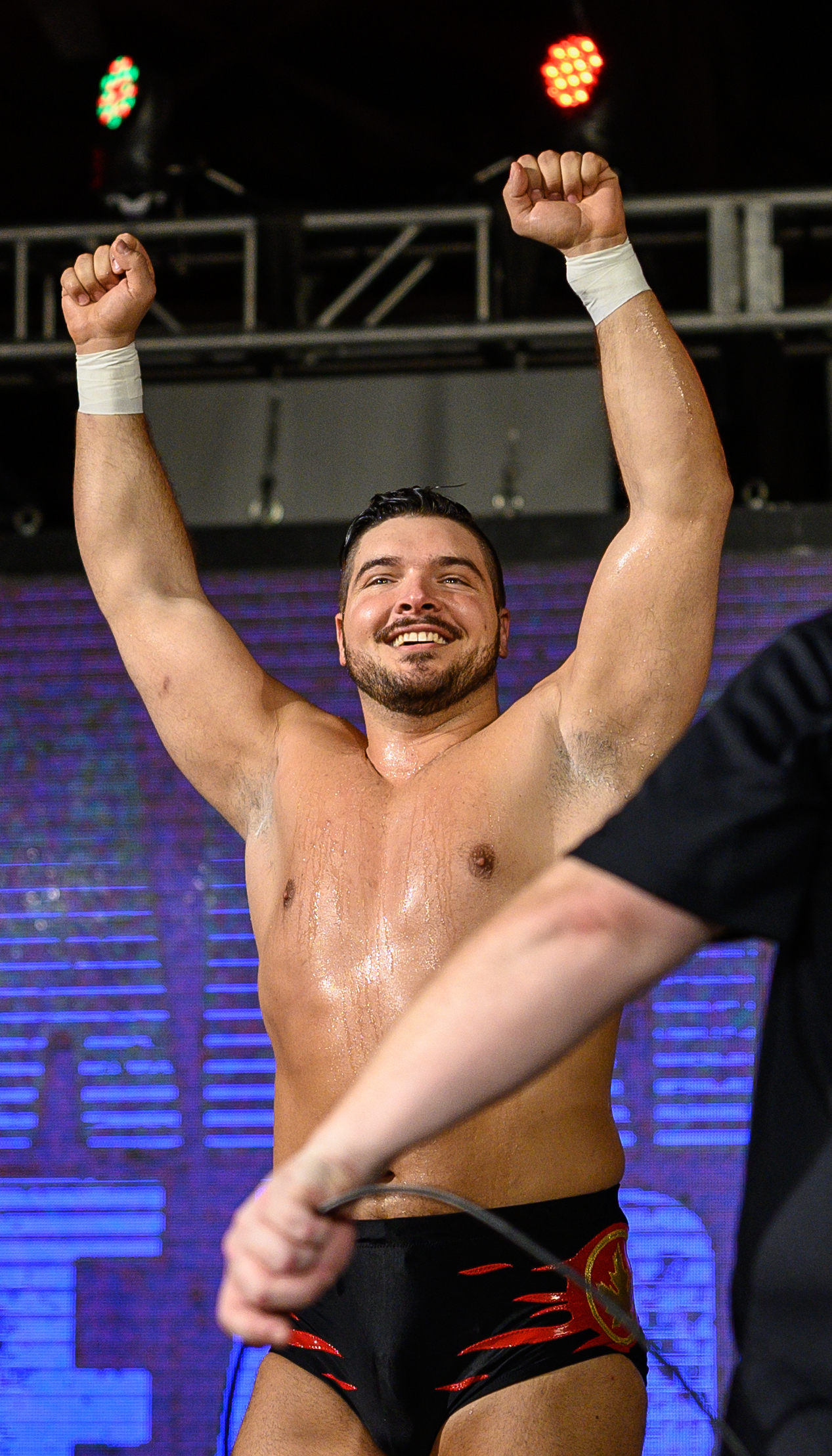
Oba Femi and Ethan Page are tied for the longest reign at 273 days.

As of November 7, 2026.

†	Indicates the current champion

Rank	Wrestler	No. of reigns	Combined days	Combined days rec. by WWE
1	Ethan Page	1	273	
1	Oba Femi	1	273	272
1	Carmelo Hayes	2	273	272
4	Wes Lee	1	269	
5	Velveteen Dream	1	231	209
6	Myles Borne	1	187	
7	Johnny Gargano	3	181	202
8	Keith Lee	1	175	181
9	Ricochet	1	161	
10	Tony D'Angelo	1	147	
11	Dominik Mysterio	2	141	139
12	Adam Cole	1	133	132
13	Roderick Strong	1	126	
14	Isaiah "Swerve" Scott	1	105	104
15	Jackson Drake †	1	69+	
16	Damian Priest	1	67	
17	Cameron Grimes	1	63	
18	Ricky Saints	1	56	55
19	Bronson Reed	1	42	41
20	Dragon Lee	1	31	
21	Shawn Spears	1	28	27
22	Leon Ruff	1	25	
23	Solo Sikoa	1	7	6
24	Trick Williams	1	3	
