= Wes Lee =

American professional wrestler (born 1994)

Dezmond Xavier
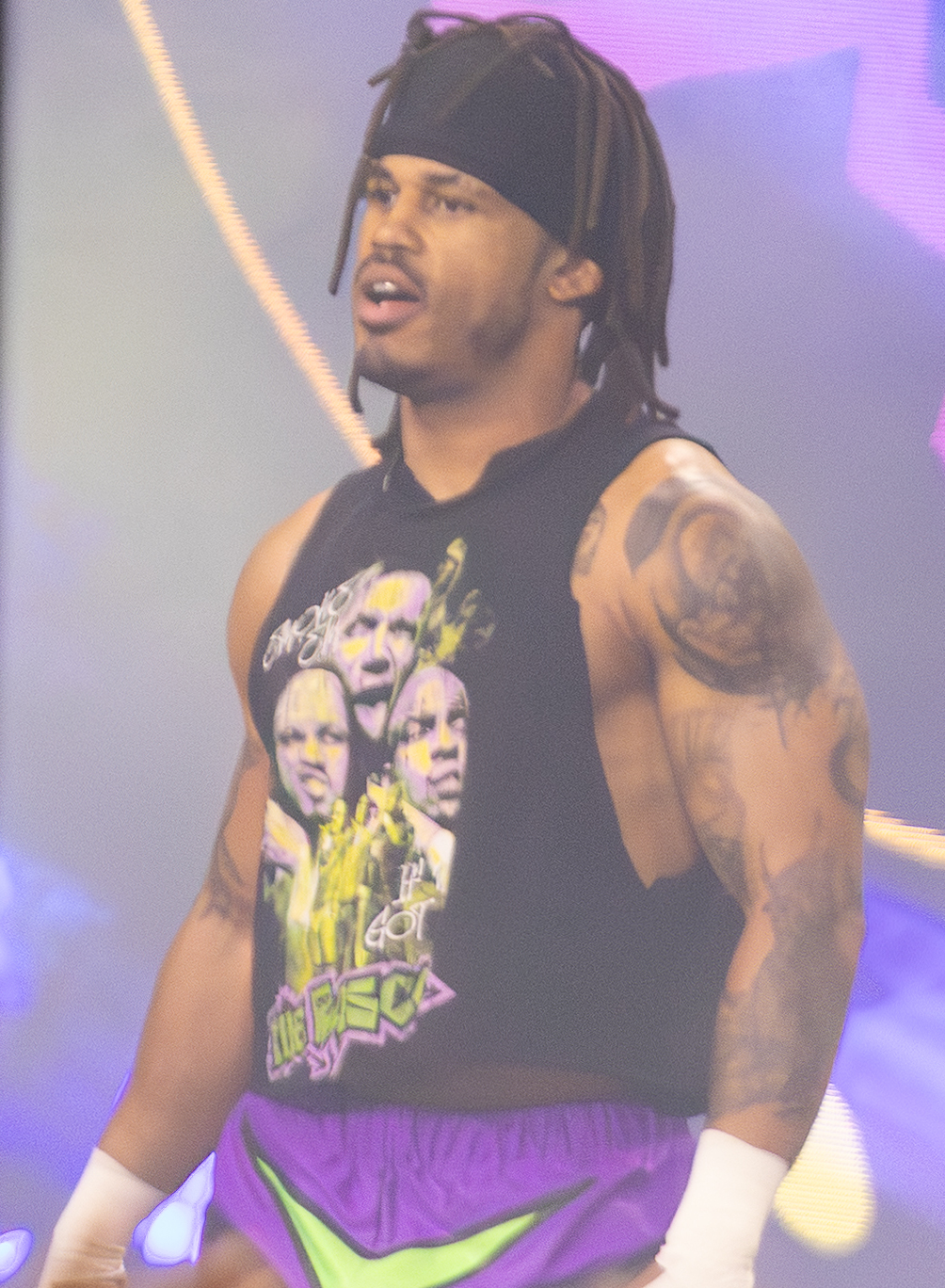
- Xavier in May 2026

Personal information
- Born: Deveon Everhart Aikens; November 2 Dayton, Ohio, U.S.
- Spouse: Erica Marie (m. 2020)

Professional wrestling career
- Ring name(s): Dez; Dezmond X Dezmond Xavier; Wes Lee
- Billed height: 5 ft 9 in (175 cm)
- Billed weight: 178 lb (81 kg)
- Billed from: Dayton, Ohio
- Trained by: Earl The Pearl; Rich Myers; Ronnie Zukko
- Debut: 2011

Deveon Everhart Aikens is an American professional wrestler. He is signed to All Elite Wrestling (AEW), where he performs under the ring name Dezmond Xavier and is a member of The Rascalz. He also makes appearances for AEW's sister promotion Ring of Honor (ROH) and on the independent circuit.

He began his professional wrestling career on the independent circuit in 2011 as Dezmond Xavier, where he became a co-founding member of The Rascalz stable in 2015. He performed on independent promotions, mostly notably for Pro Wrestling Guerrilla (PWG), where he was one-half of the PWG World Tag Team Champions alongside Zachary Wentz and went on to become one of the longest reigning champions in the promotion's history. In April 2017, he signed with Impact Wrestling. In November 2020, he departed Impact Wrestling and signed with WWE that December as Wes Lee, where he became a one-time NXT North American Champion and two-time NXT Tag Team Champion. In October 2025, he was released from WWE and returned to Impact Wrestling as Dezmond Xavier that November, now known as Total Nonstop Action Wrestling (TNA). He departed TNA in January 2026 and signed with AEW that month.

== Professional wrestling career ==
=== Independent circuit (2011–2021) ===
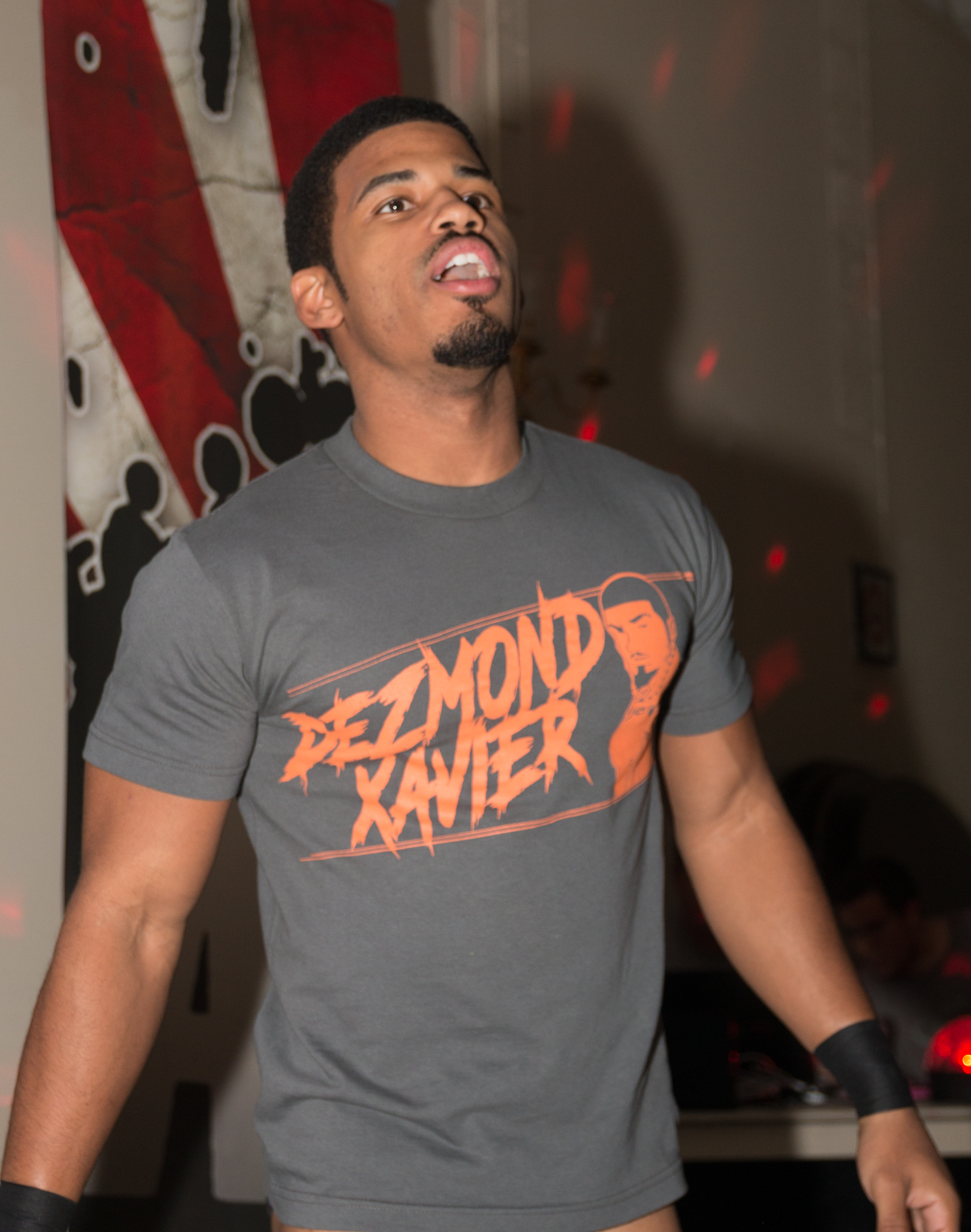
Dezmond Xavier in 2016.

Aikens made his professional wrestling debut in 2011 under the ring name Dezmond Xavier. In 2017 at WrestleCircus he won the WC Sideshow Championship by defeating Joey Ryan. Afterwards, he went to wrestle in Desastre Total Ultraviolento where he won the DTU Alto Impacto Championship.

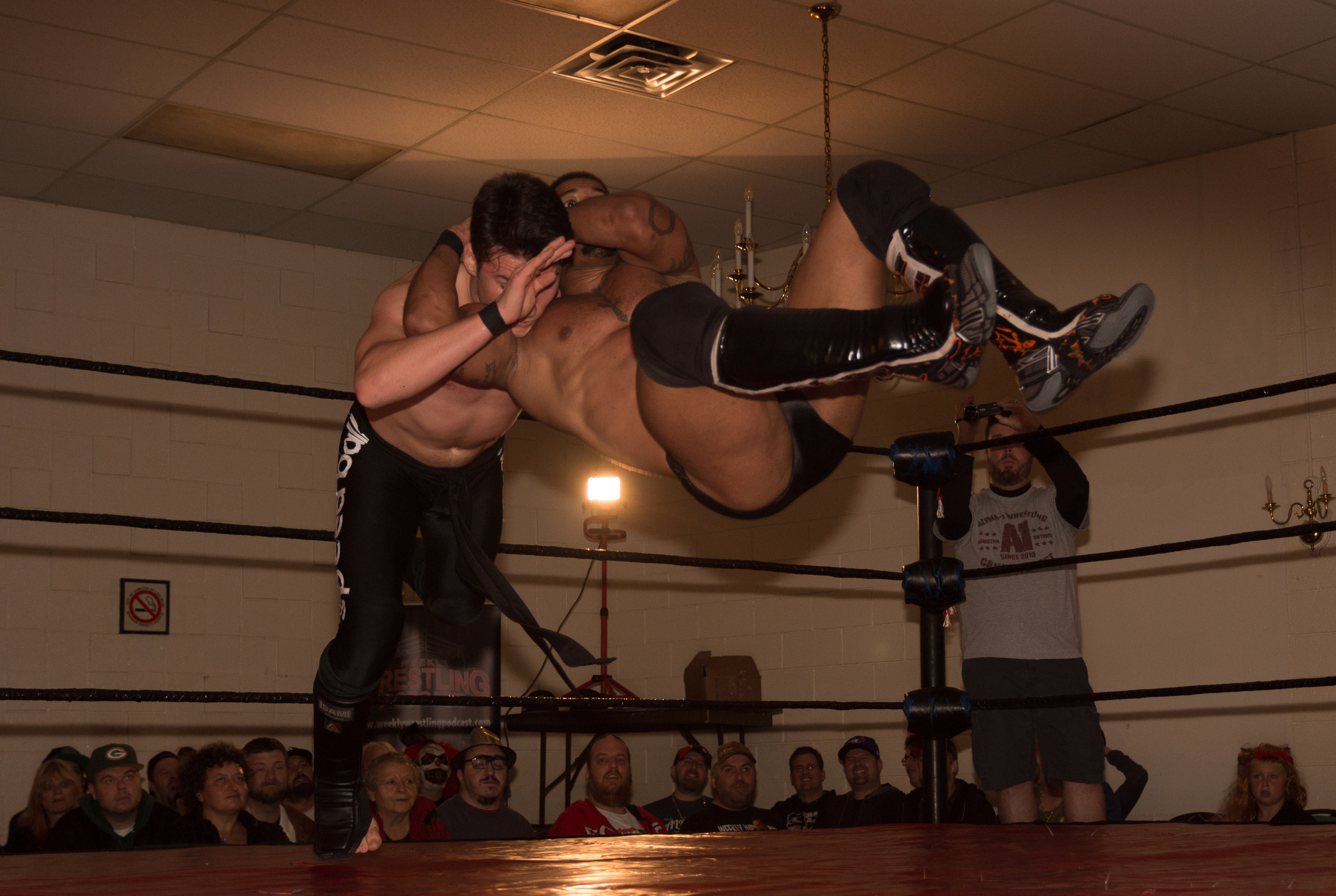
Xavier executing a stunner on "Speedball" Mike Bailey at an independent circuit event in 2016.

In 2015, Dezmond Xavier teamed with Zachary Wentz while working in the independent circuit and formed a tag team by the name of Scarlet and Graves. The team competed in Combat Zone Wrestling (CZW) where he and Wentz went on to become 2-time Combat Zone Wrestling World Tag Team Champions their first time at an event called 'Cage Of Death 18' on December 10, 2016 against EYFBO and their second time at Lucha Forever Catch Me Outside against CCK Chris Brookes and Kid Lykos after losing the titles to them in year 2017. In year 2016, before he and Wentz second AAW World Tag Title reign Dezmond Xavier and Wentz at Xtreme Intense Championship Wrestling teamed together with Trey Miguel, Aaron Williams, Kyle Maverick and the all five of them together won the XICW Tag Team Championships. Also a year after that in year 2017, he and Wentz went on to wrestle at All American Wrestling where they went on to win the AAW World Tag Team Championships on July 15, 2017 at United We Stand against AR Fox and Rey Fénix. A year later after that, Trey Miguel and Myron Reed joined the group and then the group name changed into The Rascalz.

Also in the year 2018, Dezmond Xavier and Zachary Wentz wrestled at The Wrestling Revolver where they won both the PWR Tag Team Championships and the One Night Tag Team Tournament of 2018. In the same year, Dezmond Xavier and Zachary Wentz also went on to Pro Wrestling Guerrilla (PWG) to win the PWG World Tag Team Championships. They would hold the titles for 1025 days, which to this day is the longest reign in the company's history.

=== Impact Wrestling (2017–2020) ===
==== X Division (2017–2018) ====
In 2017, Dezmond Xavier signed with Impact Wrestling. On the April 20 episode of Impact Wrestling, Xavier made his debut in a six-way match for the X Division Championship. His first singles match in Impact took place on the July 8 episode of Xplosion, where he defeated Idris Abraham. Later that month, Xavier entered the GFW Super X Cup tournament, in which he defeated Idris Abraham in the quarterfinals, Drago in the semifinals, and Taiji Ishimori in the final to win the GFW Super X Cup. In October, Xavier made his pay-per-view debut at Bound for Glory, where he competed against Trevor Lee, Garza Jr., Matt Sydal, Petey Williams and Sonjay Dutt in a six-way match for the X Division Championship but failed to win the title. Xavier also received a singles title shot for the X Division Championship against Taiji Ishimori on the January 18, 2018 episode of Impact!, which he lost.

At Redemption, Xavier competed in a six-way X Division match, which he lost. He then lost to Brian Cage at the Under Pressure special to determine the #1 contender for the X Division Championship and he also lost to Brian Cage in a match for the X Division Championship on an episode of Impact Wrestling as well. He also has another title challenge for the X Division Championship in 2018 against Matt Sydal at the One Night Only pay-per-view event Zero Fear, in which he came up short. He then took a brief hiatus from Impact.

==== The Rascalz (2018–2020) ====
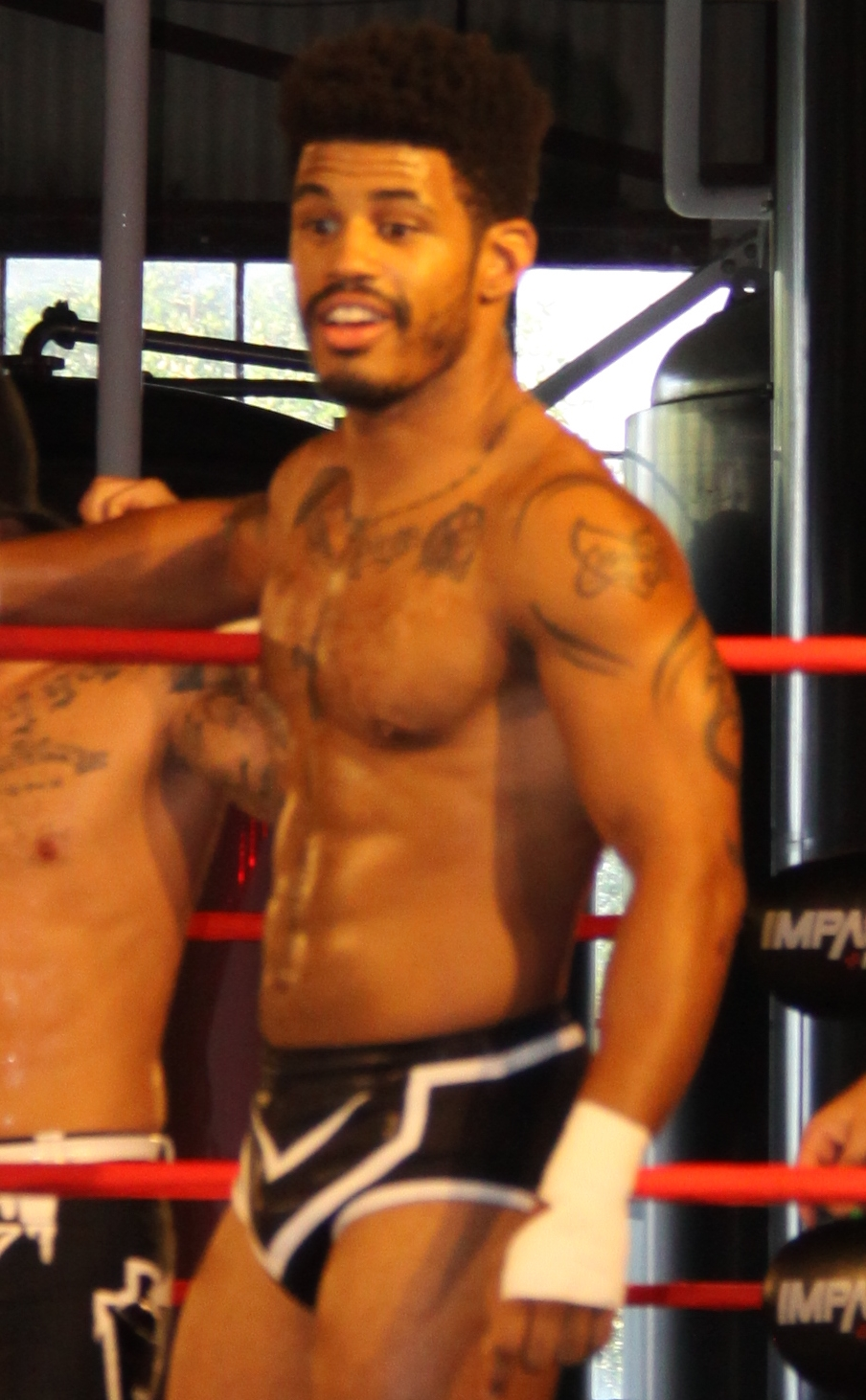
Dez in 2019

In 2018, Xavier was aligned with Trey Miguel and Zachary Wentz, forming a fan favorite stable under the name The Rascalz. A vignette aired promoting the debut of Rascalz on the November 15 episode of Impact!. Xavier returned to Impact, teaming with Wentz under the new stable name on the November 29 episode of Impact!, where they defeated the team of Chris Bey and Mike Sydal. After months of competing in the tag team division in the fall of 2018 and early 2019, the trio made their pay-per-view debut at Rebellion in April, and lost to Moose and The North. Around this time Xavier shortened his ring name to Dez while Trey Miguel and Zachary Wentz shortened their ring names to Trey and Wentz respectively. At Slammiversary XVII, Dez and Wentz unsuccessfully challenged The North for the TNA World Tag Team Championship in a three-way match, also involving Latin American Exchange (Santana and Ortiz). Dez and Trey then unsuccessfully challenged North for the World Tag Team Championship on the August 2 episode of Impact!.

In October, Dez competed against Sami Callihan in a losing effort at the Impact Plus event Prelude to Glory. In December, Dez unsuccessfully challenged Ace Austin for the X Division Championship at Motown Showdown. In 2020, Dez and Wentz unsuccessfully challenged The North for the World Tag Team Championship at February's Sacrifice event. Dez and Wentz continued their success in the tag team division by defeating XXXL and the team of TJP and Fallah Bahh at the Rebellion special. On the June 2 episode of Impact!, Dez and Wentz defeated TJP and Bahh to earn a World Tag Team Championship against The North on the June 16 episode of Impact!, which they lost. On July 18, 2020, Dez and Wentz issued an open challenge to any tag team at Slammiversary. The reunited Motor City Machine Guns accepted the challenge and won the match.

On November 11, it was revealed that The Rascalz would soon be leaving Impact and had interest from both WWE and All Elite Wrestling. During the November 17 tapings, The Rascalz were given a "send-off" by the Impact locker room. Trey confirmed the following day that he, Dez and Wentz were in fact done appearing on Impact Wrestling. Dez and Wentz went on to sign with WWE while Trey eventually returned to Impact Wrestling, effectively ending The Rascalz as a trio.

=== Dragon Gate (2018) ===
Dragon Gate announced the debut of Xavier and his indy tag team partner Zachary Wentz at Open The New Year Gate, Dragon Gate's first show of 2018. They debuted on January 13, 2018 where Xavier and Wentz, collectively known as Scarlet and Graves, teamed with Susumu Yokosuka in a winning effort against Genki Horiguchi, Flamita and Bandido.

=== Lucha Underground (2018) ===
On the July 18, 2018, episode of Lucha Underground, Aikens made his debut under the name Dezmond X and defeated Paul London for one of the seven ancient Aztec Medallions. The series was discontinued after season finale, Ultima Lucha Cuatro.

=== WWE (2020–2025) ===
==== MSK (2020–2022) ====
On December 2, 2020, Xavier along with his tag team partner Zachary Wentz signed a contract with WWE and was assigned to the WWE Performance Center. On the January 13, 2021 episode of NXT, Xavier and Wentz, now going by the ring names Wes Lee and Nash Carter, respectively, debuted under the new team name MSK. They debuted in the Men's Dusty Rhodes Tag Team Classic tournament, which they won. At NXT TakeOver: Stand & Deliver Night One, MSK defeated the Grizzled Young Veterans (James Drake and Zack Gibson) and Legado Del Fantasma (Raul Mendoza and Joaquin Wilde) in a triple threat match for the vacant NXT Tag Team Championship. On an episode of NXT, MSK defeated Fantasma to retain their tag titles. At NXT TakeOver: In Your House, MSK teamed with NXT North American Champion Bronson Reed to defeat Legado Del Fantasma in a winner takes all match which MSK won. At NXT The Great American Bash, MSK defeated Ciampa and Timothy Thatcher for the tag titles. Over the next two months, MSK defended their titles against Imperium and Oney Lorcan and Danny Burch.

At NXT Halloween Havoc, Imperium defeated MSK in a Lumber Jack-o'-Lantern Tag Team match to win the titles, only for MSK to reclaim them at NXT Stand & Deliver. However, just four days later, on April 5, 2022, it was reported that WWE had released Carter due to multiple domestic abuse allegations and photos relating to Adolf Hitler and Nazi symbolism. WWE later confirmed that the NXT Tag Team Championships were officially vacated on April 8, 2022, ending Lee's second reign at six days and also leading to the end of the group MSK in WWE.

==== NXT North American Champion (2022–2024) ====
On the April 19 episode of NXT 2.0, Lee returned to television, vaguely addressing the vacating of the tag titles, before being confronted by Xyon Quinn. This led to a match between Quinn and Lee later in the evening, with Lee losing. On the May 24, 2022 episode of NXT 2.0, Lee lost against Sanga, and was taunted by Quinn before Sanga pulled him away. The following week, Lee challenged Quinn to a match and won. On the June 14, 2022 episode of NXT 2.0 Wes Lee had another match against Xyon Quinn that he also was successful at winning in. At NXT The Great American Bash, Lee lost to Trick Williams after Williams rubbed an unknown substance into Lee's eyes.

On October 22 at NXT Halloween Havoc, Lee won the vacant NXT North American Championship in a five-man ladder match involving Carmelo Hayes, Von Wagner, Oro Mensah and Nathan Frazer. This marked Lee's first singles championship win in WWE and his third overall singles championship reign in his career. On the November 1 episode of NXT, NXT Tag Team Champions Pretty Deadly interrupted NXT Champion Bron Breakker. This led to Lee coming out, where he and Breakker challenged Pretty Deadly to a match for their tag team championship later in the show; Lee and Breakker were unsuccessful after Hayes interfered. Lee would defend the title against Tony D'Angelo, Dijak at NXT Vengeance Day, Nathan Frazer and Von Wagner over the next few months. Lee broke the record for the most successful title defenses at NXT Stand & Deliver after defending the title in a Fatal Five-Way match against Axiom, Dragon Lee, Ilja Dragunov, and JD McDonagh. Lee retained against Axiom on the next episode of NXT and on the April 18, 2023 episode of NXT against Charlie Dempsey. This defense was his record-successful defense, tying Keith Lee's record for most defenses with the championship. At NXT Battleground, Lee retained the NXT North American Championship against Tyler Bate and Joe Gacy and surpassed Velveteen Dream's 231 day title reign to become the longest reigning NXT North American Champion. On the July 18 episode of NXT, Lee lost the NXT North American Championship to "Dirty" Dominik Mysterio after interference from The Judgment Day, ending his reign at a record 269 days (which has since been surpassed by Oba Femi at 273 days in October 2024). Lee failed to regain the title in a triple threat match against Mysterio and Mustafa Ali at NXT The Great American Bash after interference from Rhea Ripley.

On the August 15 episode of NXT, Lee defeated Dijak to become the number one contender for the NXT Championship, with Lee challenging Carmelo Hayes for the title at NXT Heatwave in a losing effort. On the September 12 episode of NXT, Lee lost to Ilja Dragunov in a number one contender match for the NXT Championship. Lee was later seen clearing out his locker and when asked about it, Lee said that he was going home and that "he's done." Lee quietly returned on October 30 for a November 2 Main Event episode taping and later appearing on the following night's NXT: Halloween Havoc Night 2 to attack Mysterio after Mysterio's NXT North American Championship match against Nathan Frazer. On the November 28 episode of NXT, Lee defeated three former NXT North American Champions in Cameron Grimes, Bronson Reed and Johnny Gargano in a fatal-four way match (as demanded by Mysterio the week before) for a title match against Mysterio at NXT Deadline. However, a week later, Lee announced that he would need back surgery and will be out of action for 8–12 months, with Dragon Lee replacing him in the match at NXT Deadline. In a media call for the event, Senior Vice President of Talent Development Creative Shawn Michaels revealed that Lee was suffering from back injury for some time and the decision to pull him from the match was a last minute call made by Lee and the medical team. It was later reported that Lee had started to lose feeling in his legs and had considered retirement.

At Week 2 of Spring Breakin' on April 30, 2024, Lee made a surprise return from injury and confronted NXT North American Champion Oba Femi after his title match against Ivar. On the following week's episode of NXT, Lee defeated Josh Briggs in his first match since the injury. On the May 21 episode of NXT, Lee and Gallus' Joe Coffey both pinned Briggs in a triple threat match, and the two men were considered the winner. Later that night, NXT General Manager Ava set up a triple threat match between Lee, Femi and Coffey for the NXT North American Championship at NXT Battleground on June 9, where Femi successfully retained his title. On the June 16 episode of NXT, Lee again requested for a title match against Femi. Femi agreed under the stipulation that Lee could never challenge Femi for the title for as long as he was champion if Lee lost. At NXT Heatwave on July 7, Femi defeated Lee to retain the title.

==== The High Ryze (2024–2025) ====
On the following episode of NXT, Lee was to announce that he would walk away but was interrupted by The Rascalz teammates Trey Miguel (making his WWE debut appearance) and Zachary Wentz (the former Nash Carter, making his return to WWE). Miguel and Wentz convinced Lee to stay and the trio reunited for the first time since 2020. On the following week, The Rascalz defeated Gallus (Joe Coffey, Mark Coffey, and Wolfgang) in a six-man tag team match. At Week 2 of NXT: The Great American Bash on August 6, Wentz and Lee (as MSK) failed to defeat NXT Tag Team Champions Nathan Frazer and Axiom for the titles. After the match, Lee turned on Miguel and Wentz, lashing out at the latter for leaving him back in 2022 and turning heel for the first time in his career. On the August 20 episode of NXT, Lee faced Pete Dunne and TNA's Joe Hendry in a triple threat match for an NXT Championship match opportunity at NXT No Mercy, which was won by Hendry. After the match, Lee was attacked by Wentz. A week later, a match was set between Lee and Wentz at NXT No Mercy on September 1 where Lee lost. At Week 1 of NXT's CW premiere on October 1, Lee defeated Wentz in a Street Fight.

On the December 17 episode of NXT, it was hinted that Lee will form a new alliance with Tyriek Igwe and Tyson Dupont. On the December 31 episode of NXT, Lee teamed with Igwe and Dupont for the first time to defeat Andre Chase, Hank Walker and Tank Ledger in a six-man tag team match. On the May 13, 2025 episode of NXT, the team was known as The High Ryze. On the June 4 episode of Evolve, Lee proclaimed himself as the "gatekeeper of NXT". On the July 29 episode of NXT, Lee lost to Je'Von Evans in what would be his final WWE match. Lee's final WWE televised appearance took place on the October 8 episode of Evolve, being in the corner of Igwe and Dupont for their tag team match. Two days later, Lee was released by WWE, ending his nearly five-year tenure with the promotion.

=== Return to Total Nonstop Action Wrestling (2024–2026) ===
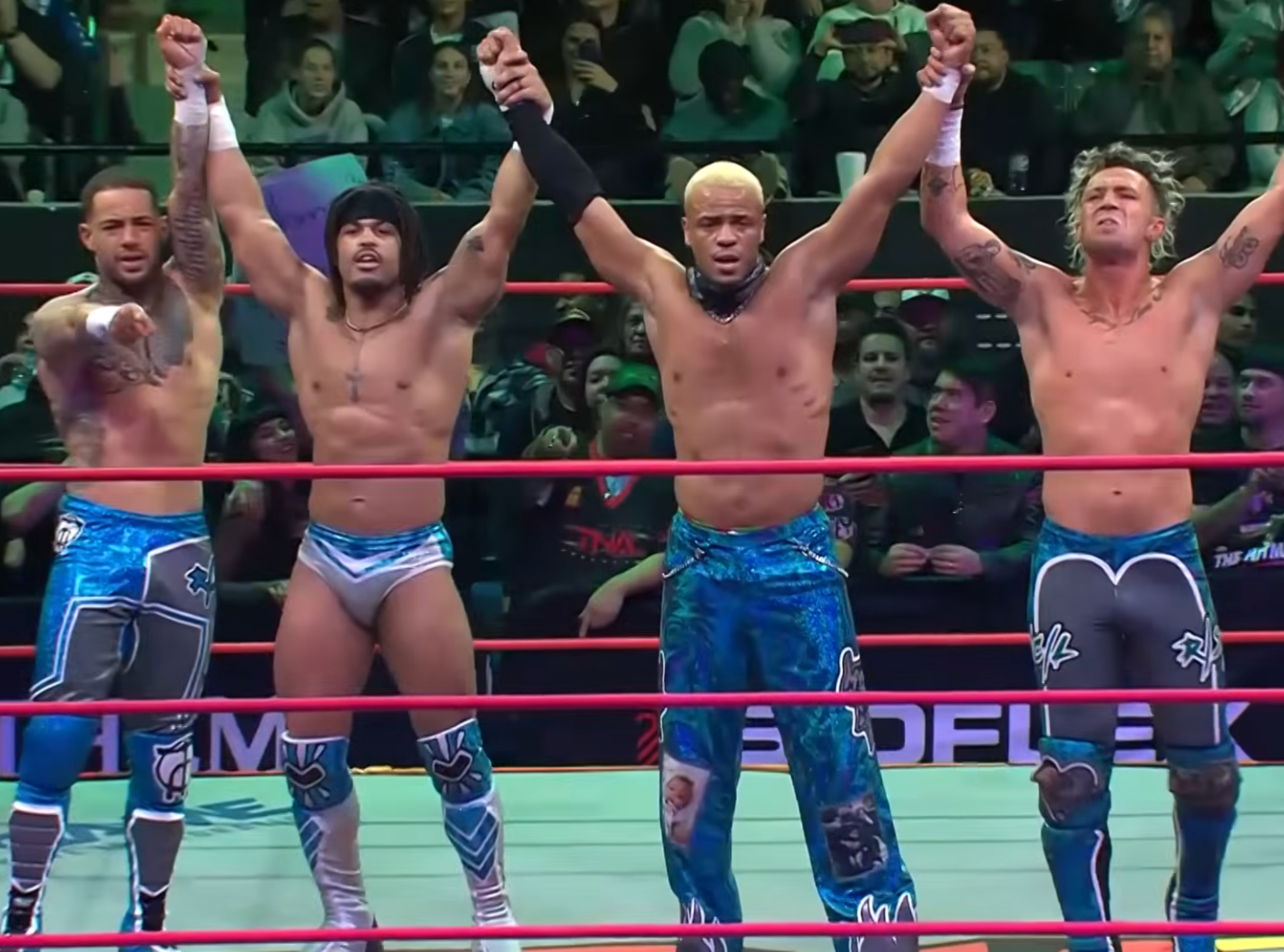
Xavier (second from the left) with The Rascalz in December 2025

Aikens returned to Total Nonstop Action Wrestling (TNA; formerly known as Impact Wrestling) as Wes Lee on July 20, 2024 at Slammiversary with The Rascalz after their reunion in NXT to defeat No Quarter Catch Crew (Charlie Dempsey, Myles Borne, and Tavion Heights) in a six-man tag team match. Lee later turned on The Rascalz in the following month. On the January 23, 2025 episode of Impact!, Lee and his new NXT allies Tyriek Igwe and Tyson Dupont interfered in the title match between NXT Tag Team Champions Nathan Frazer and Axiom against Wentz and Miguel (which Wentz and Miguel were supposed to challenge for in October 2024 but Lee (kayfabe) took out Miguel), helping Frazer and Axiom to retain the titles and reigniting his feud with The Rascalz. On the following week's episode of Impact!, Lee defeated Ace Austin in his first TNA singles match since 2020. After the match, Lee, Igwe and Dupont attacked Austin until The Rascalz made the save. At Sacrifice on March 14, Lee, Igwe and Dupont lost to The Rascalz and Austin in a "Lucha Rules" six-man tag team match, suffering their first loss as a team and to end the feud.

Following his release from WWE in October 2025, Lee, now reverted to Dezmond Xavier and turned face, reunited with The Rascalz (including Myron Reed) at Turning Point on November 14, where they defeated The System (Brian Myers, Eddie Edwards, JDC, and Moose) in an eight-man tag team match. It was later reported that Xavier is not contracted to TNA but will have creative plans in place for him. On January 13, 2026, it was reported that the contracts of all members of the stable had expired and TNA elected not to opt-in, making The Rascalz free agents.

=== Return to the independent circuit (2025–present) ===
After his WWE release, Aikens reverted to Dezmond Xavier as he returned to the independent circuit. On October 31, 2025, it was reported that Xavier will compete at House of Glory (HOG) Superclash on November 15, where he unsuccessfully challenged Charles Mason for the HOG Heavyweight Championship. On November 2, The Wrestling Revolver announced that Xavier will appear at the promotion's Season Finale event on December 13, where Xavier and Wentz won the Revolver World Tag Team Championships from Latinos Most Wanted (Koda Hernandez and Sabin Gauge).

=== All Elite Wrestling / Ring of Honor (2026–present) ===
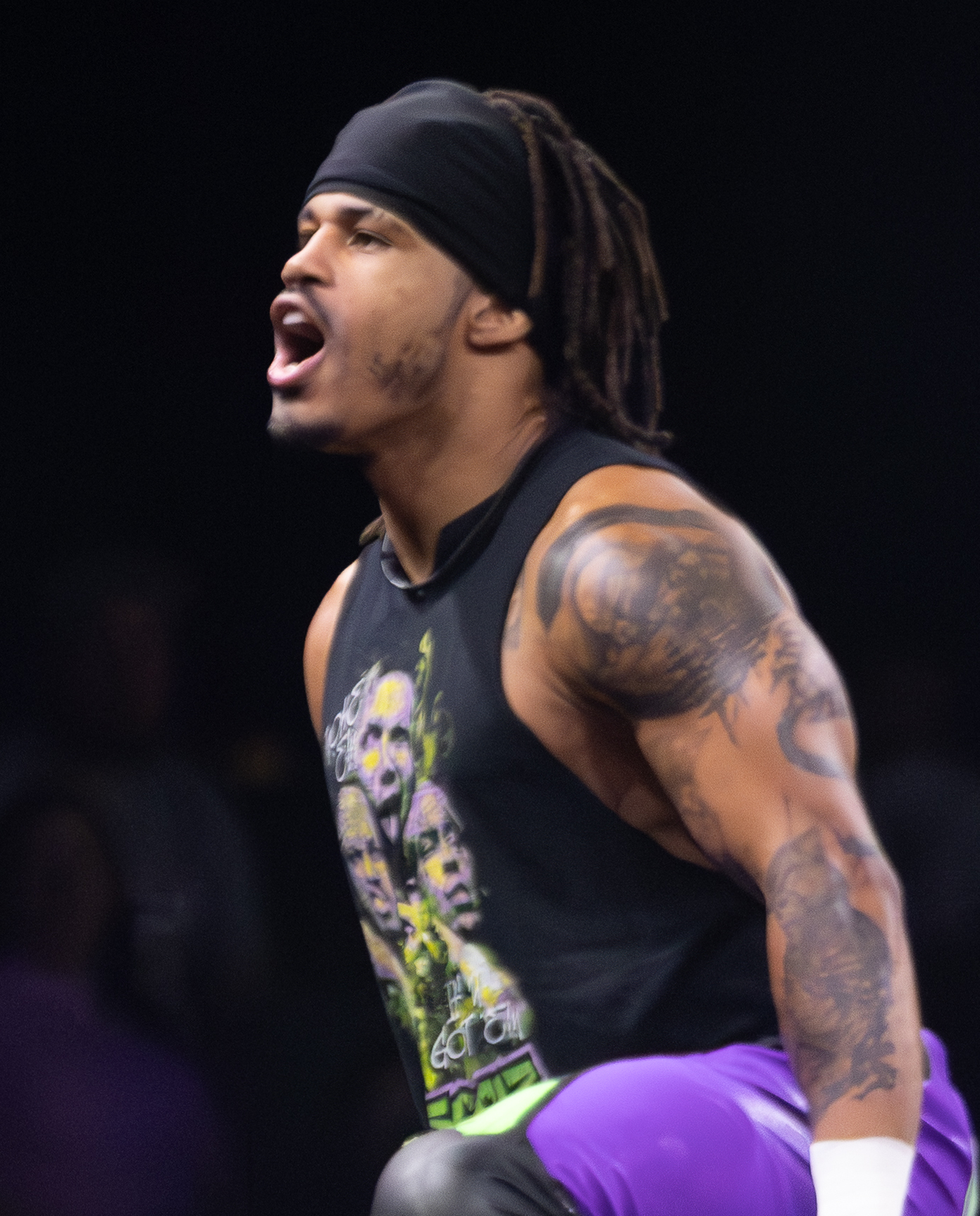
Xavier at Supercard of Honor in May 2026.

In January 2026, it was reported by Fightful Select that Xavier and the rest of The Rascalz (Myron Reed, Trey Miguel, and Zachary Wentz) had signed with All Elite Wrestling (AEW). On January 14, 2026 at Dynamite: Maximum Carnage, AEW aired a video teasing The Rascalz's arrival. The Rascalz (barring Miguel, due to Miguel being released from AEW for past controversial remarks) made their on-screen debut on January 17 at Collision: Maximum Carnage in a backstage interview with Lexy Nair. On the January 31 episode of Collision, Xavier and Wentz made their AEW in-ring debut, defeating CRU (Action Andretti and Lio Rush). Over the following months, Xavier and his stablemates would appear in AEW's sister promotion Ring of Honor (ROH), and would challenge for championships in both promotions.

== Personal life ==
Aikens is married to Erica Marie.

== Other media ==
As Wes Lee, Aikens made his video game debut in WWE 2K22 as downloadable content, and he is also playable in WWE 2K23, WWE 2K24, WWE 2K25 and WWE SuperCard.

== Championships and accomplishments ==
- All American Wrestling
  - AAW Tag Team Championship (1 time) – with Zachary Wentz
- Combat Zone Wrestling
  - CZW World Tag Team Championship (2 times) – with Zachary Wentz
- Desastre Total Ultraviolento
  - DTU Alto Impacto Championship (1 time)
- ESPN
  - Ranked No. 14 of the 30 best Pro Wrestlers Under 30 in 2023
- Impact Wrestling
  - GFW Super X Cup (2017)
  - Impact Turkey Bowl (2018) – with Alisha Edwards, Kikutaro, KM, and Fallah Bahh
- Pro Wrestling Guerrilla
  - PWG World Tag Team Championship (1 time) – with Zachary Wentz
- Pro Wrestling Illustrated
  - Ranked No. 66 of the top 500 singles wrestlers in the PWI 500 in 2023
- WrestleCircus
  - WC Sideshow Championship (1 time)
- The Wrestling Revolver
  - Revolver World Tag Team Championship (Note: During his first reign, the title was called the Revolver Tag Team Championship.) (2 times) – with Zachary Wentz (2), Trey Miguel (1)
  - The F'n Catalina Wrestling Mixer Tournament (2018) – with Zachary Wentz
- WWE
  - NXT North American Championship (1 time)
  - NXT Tag Team Championship (2 times) – with Nash Carter
  - Men's Dusty Rhodes Tag Team Classic (2021) – with Nash Carter
- Xtreme Intense Championship Wrestling
  - XICW Tag Team Championship (1 time) – with Aaron Williams, Dave Crist, Kyle Maverick, Trey Miguel, and Zachary Wentz

== Notes ==
Achievements	Vacant Title last held by Solo Sikoa	17th NXT North American Champion; October 2, 2022 – July 18, 2023	Succeeded by Dominik Mysterio
