= Malik Blade =

American professional wrestler

Personal information
- Born: Josh Dawkins; April 22, 1998 (age 28) Orlando, Florida
- Relative: Darryl Dawkins (uncle)

Professional wrestling career
- Ring name: Malik Blade
- Billed height: 6 ft 0 in (183 cm)
- Billed weight: 200 lb (91 kg)
- Trained by: D-Von Dudley
- Debut: 2018
- Retired: 2026

Josh Dawkins (born April 22, 1998) is an American professional wrestler. He is best known for his tenure in WWE under the ring name Malik Blade.

== Early career ==
Dawkins was trained by D-Von Dudley at the Dvon Dudley Academy, making his debut on the independent circuit in Orlando in 2018.

== Professional wrestling career ==
=== WWE (2021–2026) ===
Dawkins, now under the ring name Malik Blade, made his NXT brand debut on the 5 October 2021 episode of NXT, losing to Tony D'Angelo. On 26 October, at NXT: Halloween Havoc he faced Joe Gacy in a losing effort. He also made several appearances on 205 Live in late 2021. On 12 December 2022, he made his Main Event debut, teaming with Edris Enofé in a loss to Cedric Alexander and Mustafa Ali in a tag team match. On 30 July 2024 at NXT: The Great American Bash, he defeated Bronco Nima. In February 2024, it was reported that Enofé suffered a serious injury and Blade suffered a torn ACL later in November. Enofé returned on the 14 May 2025 episode of Evolve, where he announced he was going solo, breaking up their tag team partnership.

On April 24, 2026, Blade reportedly departed WWE.

== Personal life ==
Dawkins is the nephew of former NBA player Darryl Dawkins.

== Championships and accomplishments ==
- I Believe In Wrestling
  - AWA Florida Tag Team Championship (1 time) – with Kwame Nas
