= Trick Williams =

American professional wrestler (born 1994)

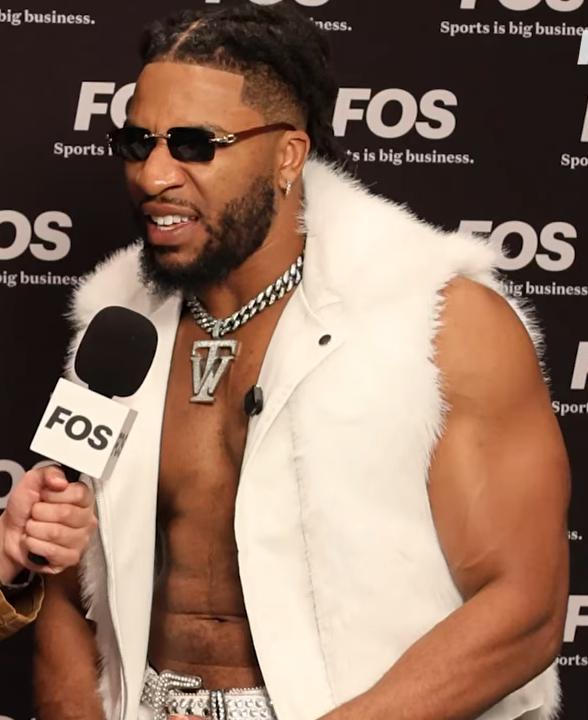
- Williams in 2026

Personal information
- Born: Matrick Mondre Belton; May 26, 1994 (age 32) Columbia, South Carolina, U.S.
- Spouse: Lash Legend (m. 2026)

Professional wrestling career
- Ring name(s): Sweet Daddy Trick; Trick Williams
- Billed height: 6 ft 5 in (196 cm)
- Billed weight: 250 lb (113 kg)
- Billed from: Columbia, South Carolina
- Trained by: CZW Academy; DJ Hyde; KnokX Academy; Matt Bloom; Norman Smiley; Robbie Brookside; Shawn Michaels; WWE Performance Center
- Debut: January 31, 2020

Matrick Mondre Belton (born May 26, 1994) is an American professional wrestler, and former football player. As of February 2021, he is signed to WWE, where he performs on the SmackDown brand under the ring name Trick Williams and is the current WWE United States Champion in his second reign.

Belton played gridiron football in college at the power five level for the South Carolina Gamecocks. He began his professional wrestling career in 2018 under the ring name Sweet Daddy Trick when he trained in Philadelphia with his uncle. Belton then signed a developmental contract with WWE in February 2021 and debuted in September of that same year on the NXT brand under the ring name Trick Williams where he became a two-time NXT Champion, a one-time NXT North American Champion, and was the winner of the 2023 Men's Iron Survivor Challenge. He also made appearances in TNA where he won the TNA World Championship in May 2025 and became the first WWE-contracted wrestler to win a TNA championship. In January 2026, he debuted on the SmackDown brand where became a two-time WWE United States Champion. He also started being managed by Lil Yachty.

== Early life, education, and football career ==
Matrick Mondre Belton was born on May 26, 1994, in Columbia, South Carolina, the son of Monica and Patrick Belton. Excelling in athletics since childhood, he attended Keenan High School, where he played basketball and American football, accumulating 1,157 yards and nine touchdowns as a senior before graduating in 2012. He then attended Hampton University and played on a full scholarship for the Hampton Pirates in 2012 and 2013; the latter season was cut short due to a pulled hamstring. He abandoned his scholarship to walk on to the South Carolina Gamecocks team, his father's alma mater, from 2014 to 2016, where he also played alongside his brothers André and Hassan. He caught 11 passes for 121 yards during his college career, all of which came in 2015. In December 2016, Belton graduated from the University of South Carolina with a degree in physical education. He went undrafted in 2017 and spent time as an assistant coach and student-teacher intern at Airport High School in West Columbia in the fall. The following year, he played in The Spring League and attended the Philadelphia Eagles rookie mini-camp on a tryout basis in May.

== Professional wrestling career ==
=== Training and early years (2018–2021) ===
After being cut from the mini-camp, Belton sent a tape to WWE in an attempt to enter the XFL, a quickly defunct football league also ran by Vince McMahon. While he was unsuccessful, WWE reached out to him via email to encourage him to try out wrestling. He participated in a WWE tryout in December 2018. He moved in with his uncle to train and perform for Combat Zone Wrestling (CZW) in Philadelphia, working as a fitness coach for Orangetheory Fitness by day and attending wrestling school at night. To honor his uncle and black roots, Belton created a Dolemite-inspired character named after his uncle's nickname, "Sweet Daddy Trick", and a short film to develop his new persona. His first recorded match took place on January 31, 2020, where he lost to D. J. Hyde. During the COVID-19 pandemic, he moved out of his uncle's house and relocated to Los Angeles, where he worked odd jobs while also training at KnokX Pro Wrestling Academy until he was signed by WWE.

=== WWE (2021–present) ===
==== Trick Melo Gang (2021–2024) ====
On February 24, 2021, Belton signed a developmental contract with WWE, reporting to the WWE Performance Center and subsequently the NXT brand. The following month, he appeared as an unnamed bodyguard of Apollo Crews on SmackDown. On the September 14 episode of NXT, Belton made his first NXT appearance as a friend of Carmelo Hayes under the ring name Trick Williams and attacked Duke Hudson, establishing himself as a heel and forming an alliance known as the Trick Melo Gang. Williams made his in-ring debut on the October 5 episode of NXT, teaming with Hayes in a fatal four-way elimination tag team match for the NXT Tag Team Championship, which was won by MSK (Nash Carter and Wes Lee). In mid-2022, Williams feuded with Lee, defeating him at NXT: The Great American Bash on July 5, before losing to Lee in a rounds match on the August 9 episode of NXT.

Williams and Hayes turned face on the April 4, 2023 episode of NXT, after Bron Breakker turned heel by attacking them. On the August 1 episode of NXT, Williams told Hayes that they needed to part ways so he could achieve his own accomplishments, amicably breaking up the Trick Melo Gang. At NXT: Heatwave on August 22, Williams lost to Ilja Dragunov. On the September 26 episode of NXT, Williams defeated Axiom, Dragon Lee and Tyler Bate in a fatal four-way match to become the number one contender for the NXT North American Championship, which he won from "Dirty" Dominik Mysterio four days later at NXT No Mercy. However, on the October 3 episode of NXT, Williams lost the title back to Mysterio after interference from Mysterio's Judgment Day stablemates, ending his reign at three days, the shortest reign in the title's history.

On the October 17 episode of NXT, Williams was slotted into the triple threat match between Hayes, Dijak and Baron Corbin to make it a fatal four-way match for a NXT Championship opportunity against Dragunov at NXT: Halloween Havoc, causing a rift between Williams and Hayes. Before the match started, Williams was found attacked backstage and taken to a hospital. Hayes then defeated Dijak and Corbin for the title opportunity. On Night 2 of Halloween Havoc on October 31, Williams returned and cost Hayes the NXT Championship match. At NXT Deadline on December 9, Williams won the men's Iron Survivor Challenge to earn an NXT Championship match against Dragunov at NXT: New Year's Evil on January 2, 2024. At the event, after it was announced that Dragunov was not medically cleared to wrestle, Hayes placed Williams in a match against Grayson Waller with his title shot on the line, which he won after interference from Kevin Owens. On the January 16 episode of NXT, Dragunov returned from injury and informed Williams that their title match would take place at NXT Vengeance Day.

==== NXT and TNA World Championship reigns (2024–2025) ====
At the same time, Williams and Hayes competed in the Dusty Rhodes Tag Team Classic tournament, losing to Corbin and Breakker in the finals at NXT Vengeance Day on February 4. Later that night, Williams failed to win the NXT Championship from Dragunov. After the match, Hayes attacked Williams with a steel chair, ending their partnership. On the following episode of NXT, Hayes revealed that he was the one who attacked Williams back in October 2023. After Tony D'Angelo defeated Hayes at NXT: Roadblock, Williams made his return and attacked Hayes. At NXT Stand & Deliver on April 6, Williams defeated Hayes. The following week on NXT, Williams called out Dragunov to challenge him for the NXT Championship. Dragunov agreed to a title match at Spring Breakin' on the condition that Williams leave NXT if he loses, which Williams accepted. In a NXT Stand & Deliver rematch on the April 16 episode of NXT, Williams defeated Hayes in a steel cage match despite interference from Hayes' security team, ending their feud. On Week 1 of Spring Breakin', Williams defeated Dragunov to capture the NXT Championship for the first time in his career.

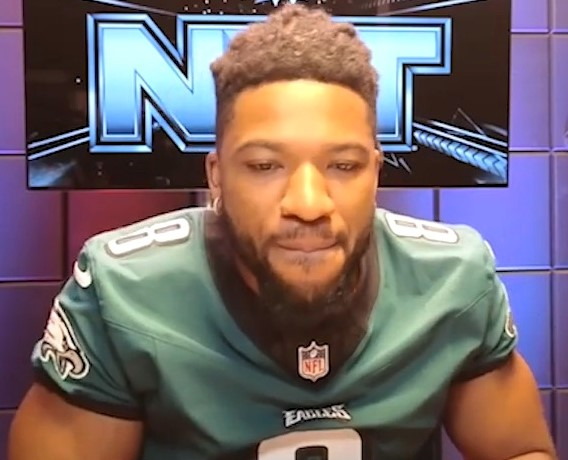
Williams in 2024

Williams began feuding with the debuting Ethan Page, who signed a contract that contained an NXT Championship match at NXT Battleground on June 9, where Williams retained the title in his first defense. At NXT Heatwave on July 7, Williams lost the title to Page in a fatal four-way match also involving Je'Von Evans and Shawn Spears, the former of whom Page pinned, ending his reign at 75 days. Following the loss, he feuded with Pete Dunne, who derided Williams for seeking advice to recapture the NXT Championship. At Week 2 of NXT: The Great American Bash on August 6, Williams lost to Dunne. He retaliated by costing Dunne a triple threat match against Joe Hendry and Wes Lee for a NXT Championship match at NXT No Mercy on September 1, where Williams served as the special guest referee for the NXT Championship match between Page and Hendry. On the September 10 episode of NXT, Williams defeated Dunne in a Last Man Standing match to end their feud and earn an NXT Championship match at NXT's CW premiere on October 1, where he defeated Page (with CM Punk as the special guest referee) to win his second NXT Championship. At NXT Halloween Havoc on October 27, Williams successfully defended the title against Page in a Devil's Playground match. After the match, he was attacked by Page and Ridge Holland, before being saved by Bubba Ray Dudley. This led to a tag team match at NXT 2300 on November 6, which Williams and Bubba Ray lost after Holland pinned Williams. At NXT Deadline on December 7, Williams defeated Holland to retain the title, ending their feud.

On the December 17 episode of NXT, Williams' title match against Eddy Thorpe ended in controversial fashion, as two referees counted two separate pins. After the show went off the air, NXT General Manager Ava confirmed that both Williams and Thorpe's shoulders were down, resulting in a double pinfall, thus Williams retained the title. At NXT: New Year's Evil on January 7, 2025, Williams lost the NXT Championship to Oba Femi in a triple threat match also involving Thorpe, ending his second reign at 98 days. Williams lost to Thorpe in a strap match at NXT Vengeance Day on February 15, but defeated him in an NXT Underground match on the March 18 episode of NXT to end their feud. At NXT Stand and Deliver on April 19, Williams failed to regain the title from Femi in a triple threat match also involving Evans. On the following episode of NXT, Williams began to tease a heel turn, as his character shifted to becoming more entitled as he whined for another title opportunity from Femi. Afterwards, Williams would insult TNA World Champion Joe Hendry following his surprise appearance and quick loss to Randy Orton at WrestleMania 41. Williams solidified his heel turn by attacking Hendry at Rebellion and helping DarkState defeat Hendry and Hank and Tank (Hank Walker and Tank Ledger) on the May 6 episode of NXT. Hendry caused Williams to be eliminated from the battle royal to determine the number one contender for the NXT Championship later that night, with a match between the two being made official for the TNA World Championship at NXT Battleground.

At NXT Battleground on May 25, Williams defeated Hendry to win the TNA World Championship. On the June 3 episode of NXT, Williams retained the title against Mike Santana after interference from A. J. Francis and KC Navarro of First Class. On the August 19 episode of NXT, Williams lost to Evans in a match to determine the number one contender for the NXT Championship at NXT Heatwave after interference from Santana, who eventually defeated Williams to win the TNA World Championship at Bound for Glory. Williams began feuding with NXT Champion Ricky Saints after abandoning him during the Survivor Series-style match between Team NXT and Team TNA on October 7 at NXT vs. TNA Showdown. He failed to win the NXT Championship from Saints at NXT Halloween Havoc on October 25, and in a Last Man Standing match on the November 11 episode of NXT. At Week 2 of NXT: Gold Rush on November 25, Williams lost to Myles Borne in a men's Iron Survivor Challenge qualifying match. On the December 26 episode of SmackDown, Williams declared himself to be a free agent, ending his time in NXT.

==== SmackDown and United States Champion (2026–present) ====
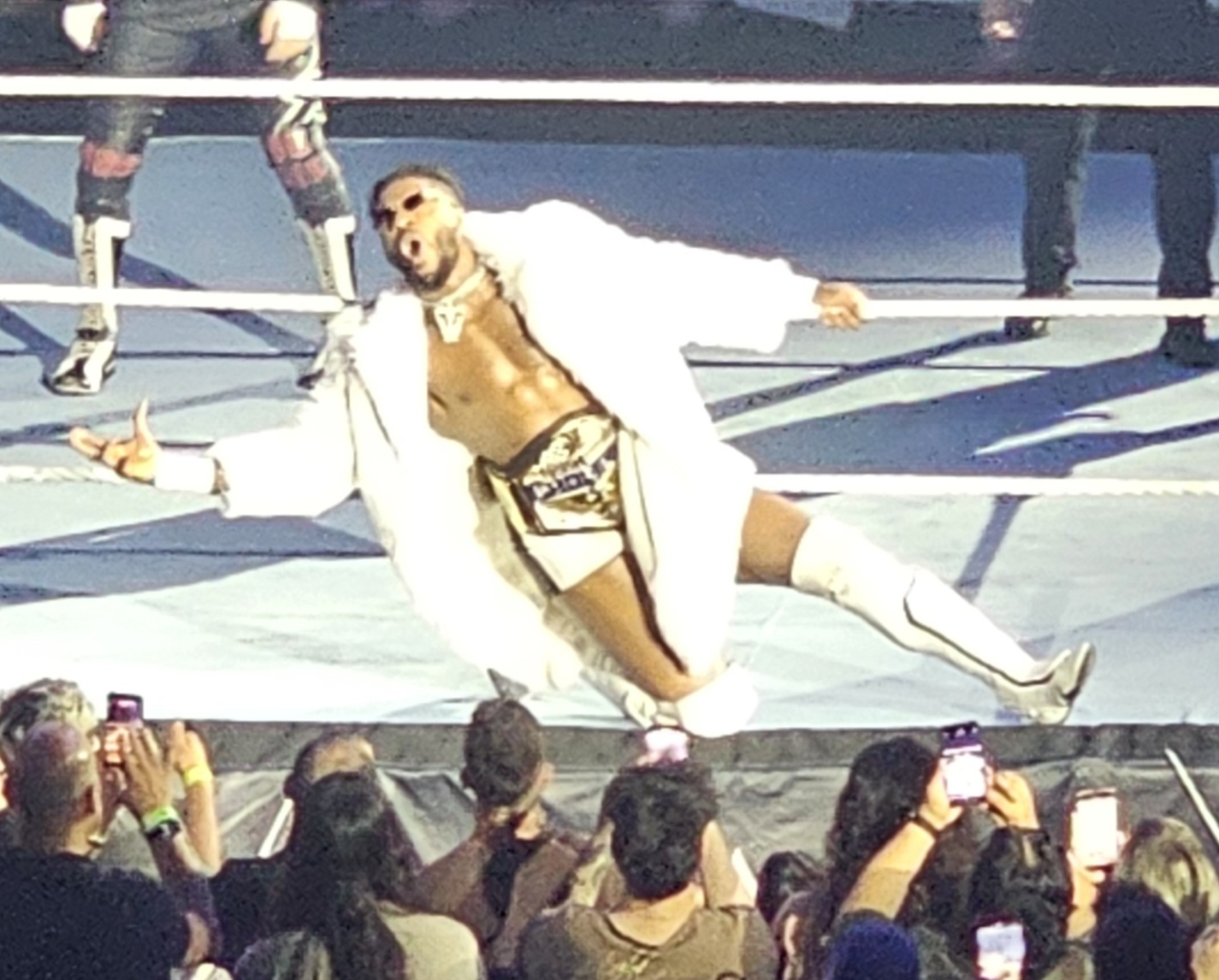
Williams as United States Champion

On the January 2, 2026 episode of SmackDown, Williams confronted Sami Zayn and announced that he had been signed to the SmackDown brand. The following week on SmackDown, Williams defeated Rey Fénix in his first match as a main roster talent. On January 16, Williams defeated Matt Cardona to qualify for a fatal four-way match at Saturday Night's Main Event on January 24 to determine the number one contender for the Undisputed WWE Championship, which was won by Zayn. At Royal Rumble on January 31, Williams entered the Royal Rumble match at #10, eliminating Mr. Iguana and El Grande Americano (I) before being eliminated by Cody Rhodes. On February 20, he defeated Carmelo Hayes and Damian Priest to qualify for the Elimination Chamber match at the titular event on February 28, where he was eliminated by Logan Paul.

At Night 2 of WrestleMania 42 on April 19, Williams (with Lil Yachty) defeated Zayn to win the United States Championship for the first time in his career. On the following episode of SmackDown, Williams and Yachty solidified their partnership as the Trick-Yachty Gang, turning Williams face in the process. They also announced that the United States Championship open challenge (which was held by former champions Zayn, Ilja Dragunov, and Carmelo Hayes) was abolished. Williams successfully defended the title for the first time against Zayn at Backlash on May 9.. Williams successfully defended the United States Championship against Ricky Saints at Night of Champions on June 27. The following month, Lil Yachty gifted Williams a custom United States Championship belt, lined in white fur to match his white fur jacket. At SummerSlam Night 2 on August 2, Williams lost the title to Baron Corbin, ending his first reign at 105 days. On following August 7 episode of SmackDown, Williams failed to regain the title from Corbin. At Sunday Night's Main Event on September 6, after Corbin was failed to defeat Yachty under 5 minutes, Williams received an immediate title shot and defeated Corbin to win his second United States Championship. On the September 18 episode of SmackDown, Williams defeated Randy Orton and Rey Fénix to qualify for the Men's Money in the Bank ladder match. On the September 25 episode of SmackDown, Williams defeated Corbin in a steel cage match to retain his title and ending their feud. At the event on October 10, Williams failed to win the match as it was won by Penta. On the October 30 episode of SmackDown, Williams challenged Zayn for the Undisputed WWE Championship in a losing effort after interference from Zayn's allies Johnny Gargano and Candice LeRae. On the November 20 episode of SmackDown, Williams was accepted as the final member of Team USA for the 5-on-5 traditional Survivor Series elimination match at Survivor Series: WarGames. However, Williams was (kayfabe) injured during his match against Damian Priest, leaving his status for Survivor Series: WarGames unknown.

=== Total Nonstop Action Wrestling (2025) ===
Trick Williams made his Total Nonstop Action Wrestling (TNA) debut at Rebellion on April 27, 2025, attacking Joe Hendry following his successful TNA World Championship defense against Frankie Kazarian and Ethan Page. Williams attacked Hendry again on the May 1 episode of Impact!, costing him and the Hardy Boyz their match against Kazarian, Nic Nemeth and Ryan Nemeth. Williams and Kazarian lost to Hendry and Elijah in a tag team match at Under Siege on May 23.

On May 25, Williams defeated Hendry to win the TNA World Championship at NXT Battleground, marking the first time a WWE-contracted wrestler won a TNA title. Williams successfully defended the title against Elijah at Against All Odds on June 6 with the help of A. J. Francis, Hendry and Mike Santana at Slammiversary on July 20, and Moose at Emergence on August 15. Santana and Steve Maclin defeated Williams and Francis on the August 28 episode of Impact!, earning Santana the right to challenge Williams for the TNA World Championship. At Bound For Glory on October 12, Williams lost the title to Santana, ending his reign at 140 days.

== Other media ==
=== Video games ===
Trick Williams in video games
Year	Title	Ref.	Notes
2023	WWE 2K23		Video game debut; added as DLC
2024	WWE 2K24		
2025	WWE 2K25		
2026	WWE 2K26		

=== Television ===
Belton worked as an extra in the third season of the TV series All American. He also appeared as a guest star in the finale of the show's seventh season, portraying the character of Eddie Blair.

== Discography ==
List of singles as lead artist
Title	Year	Album
"Good Lookin' Wrassla"	2023	Non-album singles
"The Realest"	2024	Non-album singles
"Game Over"	2024	Non-album singles
"Tricky Whoopin'"	2024	Non-album singles
"Pronto" (feat. Kevo)	2025	Non-album singles
"Average Joe"	2025	Non-album singles
"Mike Who?"	2025	Non-album singles
"Gingerbread Man" (feat. Lil Yachty)	2026	Non-album singles

== Personal life ==
On June 20, 2026, Belton married fellow professional wrestler Anriel Howard, better known under the ring name Lash Legend, in Port Antonio, Jamaica.

== Championships and accomplishments ==
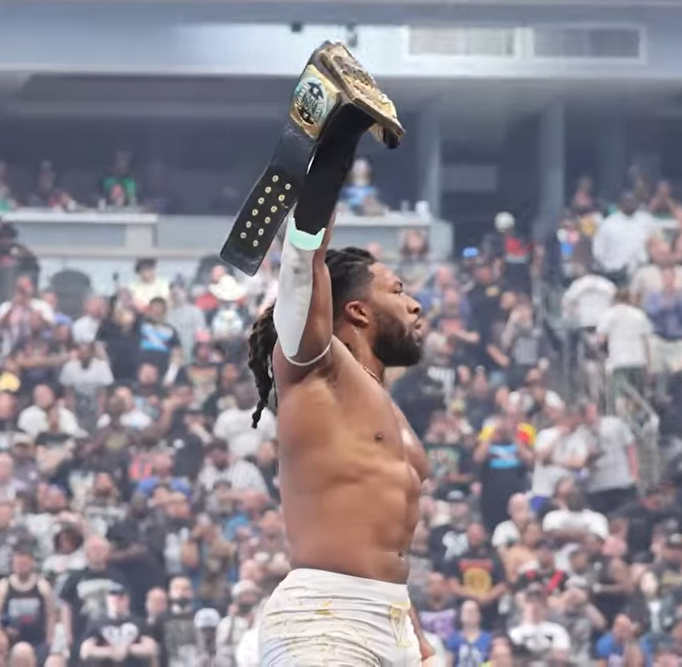
Williams is a two-time and current WWE United States Champion

- Pro Wrestling Illustrated
  - Ranked No. 8 of the top 500 singles wrestlers in the PWI 500 in 2026
- Total Nonstop Action Wrestling
  - TNA World Championship (1 time)
- WWE
  - WWE United States Championship (2 times, current)
  - NXT Championship (2 times)
  - NXT North American Championship (1 time)
  - Men's Iron Survivor Challenge (2023)
  - NXT Year-End Award
    - Match of the Year (2025) – vs. Oba Femi and Je'Von Evans at NXT Stand & Deliver

== See also ==
- List of gridiron football players who became professional wrestlers
