= NXT: Roadblock (2025) =

WWE television special

- Promotional poster featuring Trick Williams, Stephanie Vaquer, Giulia, Oba Femi, and Tony D'Angelo
- Promotion: WWE
- Brand: NXT
- Date: March 11, 2025
- City: New York City, New York
- Venue: The Theater at Madison Square Garden

NXT special episodes chronology
← Previous; New Year's Evil	Next → Homecoming

Roadblock chronology
← Previous; 2024	Next → —

The 2025 NXT: Roadblock was a professional wrestling television special produced by WWE, held for wrestlers from the promotion's developmental brand, NXT. It was NXT's fourth annual Roadblock, and WWE's sixth overall, and aired as a special episode of the weekly series NXT on the The CW. The event was broadcast live on March 11, 2025, from The Theater at Madison Square Garden in the New York City borough of Manhattan, New York. It also featured wrestlers from partner promotion Total Nonstop Action Wrestling (TNA). The event's title was a reference to its position on the road to Stand & Deliver, NXT's WrestleMania week event.

Five matches were contested at the event. In the main event, Stephanie Vaquer defeated Giulia in a Winner Takes All match to retain the NXT Women's North American Championship and win the NXT Women's Championship, becoming the first female double champion in NXT history. In other prominent matches, NXT's Oba Femi defeated TNA's Moose retain the NXT Championship, and in the opening bout, TNA's The Hardy Boyz (Jeff Hardy and Matt Hardy) defeated NXT's Nathan Frazer and Axiom to retain the TNA World Tag Team Championship.

== Production ==
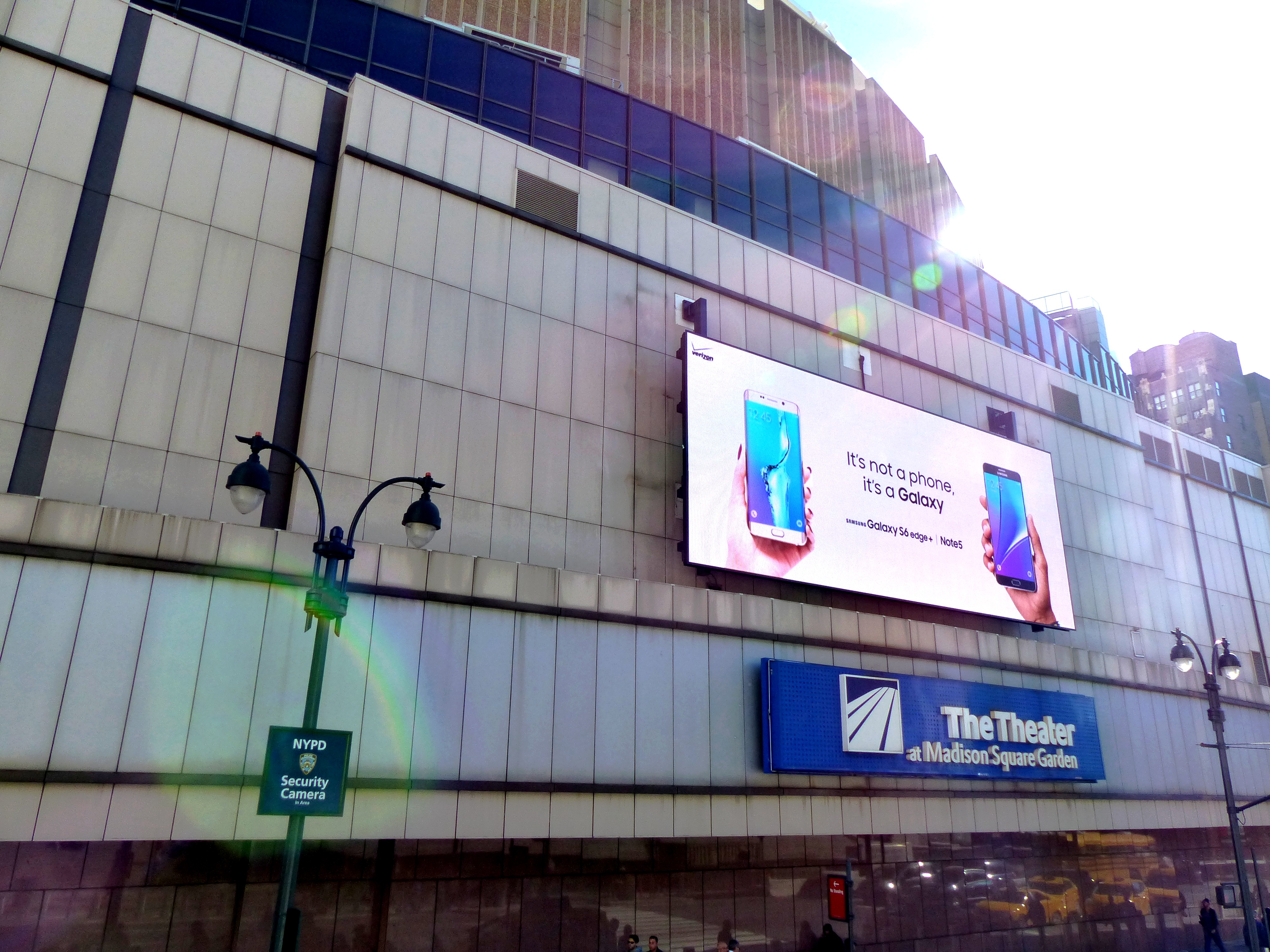
NXT's fourth annual Roadblock took place at The Theater at Madison Square Garden in the New York City borough of Manhattan, New York.

=== Background ===
Roadblock is a professional wrestling event established by WWE in 2016. After the first two events were held for the main roster in March 2016 and December 2016, respectively, Roadblock was discontinued. However, in March 2022, the event was reinstated for WWE's developmental brand, NXT, as an annual television special episode of NXT, with its name being a reference to its position on the road to Stand & Deliver, NXT's WrestleMania week event.

On February 11, 2025, it was announced that NXT's fourth Roadblock, and WWE's sixth Roadblock overall, would take place on March 11, 2025, at The Theater at Madison Square Garden in the New York City borough of Manhattan, New York. Unlike the previous three years, which aired on the USA Network, the 2025 special was broadcast on The CW as NXT moved from USA to The CW in October 2024. The event was also preceded by Monday Night Raw, which was held the previous night at the main Madison Square Garden. Beginning with Halloween Havoc in 2024, all major NXT events are branded solely with the WWE logo instead of the NXT logo, marking the first Roadblock event since Roadblock: End of the Line in 2016 to just use the promotion's logo.

=== Storylines ===
The card included five matches that resulted from scripted storylines. Results were predetermined by WWE's writers on the NXT brand, while storylines were produced on the weekly television program, NXT, as well as Total Nonstop Action Wrestling's (TNA) weekly television program, Impact!, following WWE and TNA signing a multi-year partnership in January 2025.

At Vengeance Day on February 15, after his successful title defense, NXT Champion Oba Femi was ambushed by a debuting four-man heel group consisting of Dion Lennox, Cutler James, Saquon Shugars, and Osiris Griffin. On the following episode of NXT, Femi addressed the attack and challenged the group to finish what they started, only to be interrupted by TNA X Division Champion Moose in his debut appearance in WWE. Moose stated that a match between the two had to happen, which Femi agreed. On the February 20 episode of Impact!, after Moose's System stablemate JDC defeated Leon Slater, The System (Alisha Edwards, Eddie Edwards, Brian Myers, and JDC) viciously attacked Slater. When Moose was about to attack Slater, TNA World Tag Team Champions The Hardy Boyz (Jeff Hardy and Matt Hardy) appeared and came to Slater's aid, but were outnumbered. Femi then made a surprise appearance, laying out JDC, Myers, and Eddie, before staring down Moose. On the February 25 episode of NXT, after Moose successfully defended his title, Femi announced that he would defend the NXT Championship against Moose at Roadblock.

At TNA Genesis on January 19, NXT Tag Team Champions Nathan Frazer and Axiom made a surprise appearance and sat at ringside to watch The Hardy Boyz (Jeff Hardy and Matt Hardy) defend the TNA World Tag Team Championship, teasing a match against each other. On the February 25 episode of NXT, The Hardy Boyz defeated No Quarter Catch Crew (Myles Borne and Tavion Heights) in a non-title match in their first match as a team in WWE since 2019. During the match, Frazer and Axiom appeared to watch it at ringside, and afterwards, they confronted The Hardy Boyz. Frazer then claimed that he and Axiom were the best tag team in the world today, but that The Hardy Boyz were the best tag team of all time. Jeff then stated that they should have a match. TNA Director of Authority Santino Marella subsequently appeared and announced that after speaking with NXT General Manager Ava, The Hardy Boyz would defend the TNA World Tag Team Championship against Frazer and Axiom at Roadblock.

In 2024, former New Japan Pro-Wrestling rivals Giulia and Stephanie Vaquer made their WWE debuts. Giulia would go on to win the NXT Women's Championship at New Year's Evil while Vaquer won the NXT Women's North American Championship at Vengeance Day. Following Vaquer's successful title defense on the February 25 episode of NXT, she was confronted by Giulia, who said that Vaquer called herself the best champion, but Giulia claimed that she was better. Giulia said that although she was Vaquer's friend, she wanted to challenge her to a Winner Takes All match for both the NXT Women's Championship and NXT Women's North American Championship. Later that night, NXT General Manager Ava made the match official for Roadblock.

After losing the NXT Championship and an NXT North American Championship match in 2024, Ethan Page went into an emotional turmoil and became depressed. On the December 17 episode of NXT, Page stated that he deserved all the hate he was getting from the fans and that he had lost his smile. He was then interrupted by Je'Von Evans, who praised him and said that Page deserved to be where he was now. Page said Evans was right and that he should not worry about losing his smile, but rather take away Evans smile, prompting Page to attack Evans, crushing his jaw with a steel chair. Two weeks later, Page defeated Evans' tag team partner Cedric Alexander and crushed Alexander's hand with a toolbox. On the January 14 episode, Page defeated Dante Chen and crushed Chen's leg with the steel steps. Evans returned to attack Page but was knocked down by Page punching his injured jaw. On the February 4 episode, NXT General Manager Ava decided to suspend Evans so that he would avoid more severe injury, but Page said that Evans should be "punished" by facing him. Ava then stated that they could face each other at Vengeance Day, but only if Evans was medically cleared. On the next episode, Evans was cleared to compete, but Ava made him sign a waiver that WWE would not be responsible for any damage to Evans. After signing the waiver, Ava reluctantly made the match official, which Page won. After some confrontations between Page and Evans, they faced each other in a tag team match on the February 25 episode, where Evans' team won. On March 4, NXT General Manager Ava announced that a rematch between Evans and Page would take place at Roadblock in a New York City street fight.

On the February 25 episode of NXT, Jordynne Grace talked about wanting to become a champion in NXT before being interrupted by Roxanne Perez, who stated that Grace was now in her division going for her NXT Women's Championship, the title she claimed to have made famous. Grace then mocked Perez and asked about her championship, which Perez lost in January at New Year's Evil, prompting Perez to respond that she defeated Grace to retain the title back in June 2024 at NXT Battleground when Grace was still part of TNA. After Perez said that she would send Grace back to TNA, Grace attacked Perez. On the next episode, Perez attacked Grace backstage after her match, and later, NXT General Manager Ava announced that Perez would face Grace at Roadblock.

== Aftermath ==
While the March 31, 2026, episode of NXT at Madison Square Garden was initially advertised as the 2026 Roadblock, some time before the episode was set to air, for unknown reasons, the Roadblock name was quietly dropped from the event and it was instead presented as a standard episode of NXT, though some websites, such as Bleacher Report, still referred to it as Roadblock.

== Results ==
No.	Results	Stipulations	Times
1	The Hardy Boyz (Jeff Hardy and Matt Hardy) (c) defeated Nathan Frazer and Axiom by pinfall	Tag team match for the TNA World Tag Team Championship	12:08
2	Jordynne Grace defeated Roxanne Perez by pinfall	Singles match	11:27
3	Oba Femi (c) defeated Moose by pinfall	Singles match for the NXT Championship	13:36
4	Je'Von Evans defeated Ethan Page by pinfall	New York City Street Fight	14:41
5	Stephanie Vaquer (North American) defeated Giulia (NXT) by pinfall	Winner Takes All match for the NXT Women's Championship and NXT Women's North American Championship	11:22
(c) / – the champion(s) heading into the match
