= NXT: Roadblock (2024) =

WWE television special

- Promotion: WWE
- Brand: NXT
- Date: March 5, 2024
- City: Orlando, Florida
- Venue: WWE Performance Center

NXT special episodes chronology
← Previous; New Year's Evil	Next → Spring Breakin'

Roadblock chronology
← Previous; 2023	Next → 2025

The 2024 NXT: Roadblock was a professional wrestling television special produced by WWE, held exclusively for wrestlers from the promotion's developmental brand, NXT. It was NXT's third annual Roadblock, and WWE's fifth overall, and aired as a special episode of the weekly series NXT on the USA Network. The event was broadcast live on March 5, 2024, from NXT's home venue, the WWE Performance Center in Orlando, Florida for a third consecutive year. The event's title was a reference to its position on the road to Stand & Deliver, NXT's WrestleMania week event.

Six matches were contested at the event. In the main event, Tony D'Angelo defeated Carmelo Hayes to become the #1 contender for the NXT Championship. In another prominent match, SmackDown's The Kabuki Warriors (Asuka and Kairi Sane) defeated Tatum Paxley and Lyra Valkyria to retain the WWE Women's Tag Team Championship, and in the opening match, Dijak defeated Joe Gacy in an Asylum match. The event also featured the returns of Sol Ruca and Trick Williams. This would also be the last Roadblock to air on USA Network, as NXT moved to The CW in October.

== Production ==
=== Background ===
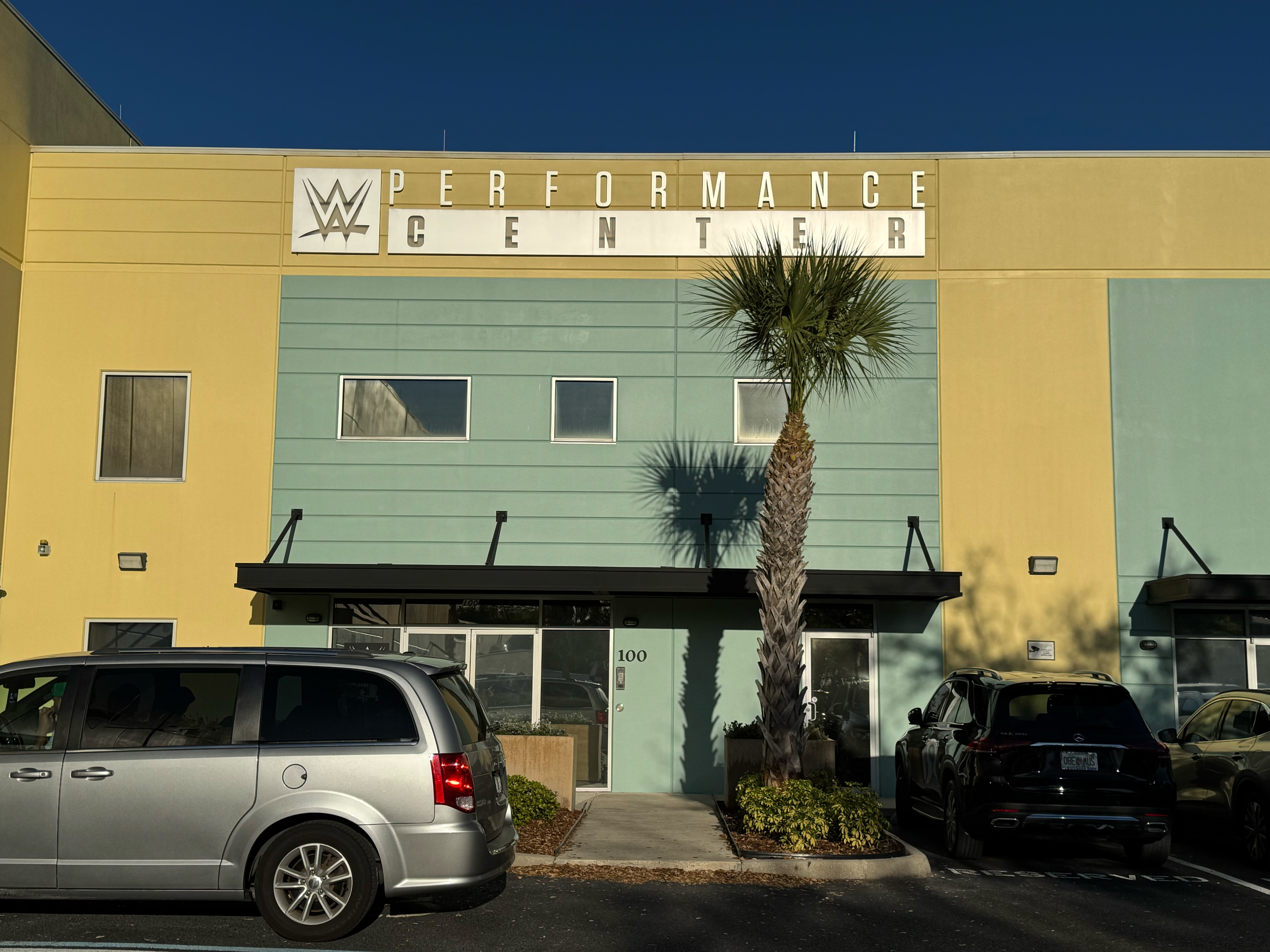
NXT's third annual Roadblock was held at the brand's home venue, the WWE Performance Center in Orlando, Florida for a third consecutive year.

Roadblock is a professional wrestling event established by WWE in 2016. After the first two events were held for the main roster in March 2016 and December 2016, respectively, Roadblock was discontinued. However, in March 2022, the event was reinstated for WWE's developmental brand, NXT, as an annual television special episode of NXT, with its name being a reference to its position on the road to Stand & Deliver, NXT's WrestleMania week event. At Vengeance Day, it was announced that NXT's third Roadblock, and WWE's fifth Roadblock overall, would be broadcast as the March 5, 2024, episode of NXT on the USA Network, held at NXT's home venue, the WWE Performance Center in Orlando, Florida for a third consecutive year.

=== Storylines ===
The card included matches that resulted from scripted storylines. Results were predetermined by WWE's writers on the NXT brand, while storylines were produced on the weekly television program, NXT, and the supplementary online streaming show, Level Up.

On the January 16 episode of NXT, Dijak faced Trey Bearhill, with Joe Gacy serving as commentator. During the match, Gacy headbutted Dijak. After Dijak won the match against Bearhill, Gacy attacked Dijak from behind and both men started brawling. The following week, a match between Gacy and Dijak was scheduled, but the match didn't happen due to Gacy attacking Dijak before the bell rang. Both men continued fighting until they were pulled apart by referees and security guards. At Vengeance Day on February 4, Dijak defeated Gacy in a No Disqualification match. During Dijak's matches after Vengeance Day, Gacy started appearing under the ring apron. On the February 13 episode of NXT, Gacy faced Carmelo Hayes in a losing effort. After the match, Dijak attacked Gacy with a nightstick and then locked him in a straitjacket and left. The following week, Dijak locked Gacy in an asylum cell, with Gacy laughing and telling Dijak that "this wasn't over". On the February 27 episode of NXT, Dijak defeated Luca Crusifino. After the match, Gacy ripped apart the straitjacket and started beating down Dijak until both men went backstage, where they continued fighting. An Asylum match was then announced for Roadblock between Dijak and Gacy.

At Vengeance Day on February 4, Trick Williams, who was accompanied by Carmelo Hayes, failed to win the NXT Championship from Ilja Dragunov. After the match, Hayes attacked Williams with a steel chair, ending their partnership and turning heel in the process. On the following episode of NXT, Hayes revealed that he was the one who attacked Williams back in October 2023 and set his sights at Dragunov and the NXT Championship. On the February 27 episode of NXT, Tony D'Angelo told Dragunov that he was willing to earn a title shot at the NXT Championship. Dragunov accepted D'Angelo's proposal and NXT General Manager Ava set a match between Hayes and D'Angelo at Roadblock to determine a #1 contender to the NXT Championship at Stand & Deliver.

In December 2023, Tatum Paxley developed a deranged obsession with NXT Women's Champion Lyra Valkyria. Over the next few months, Paxley interfered in Valkyria's matches, including helping Valkyria retain her title at Vengeance Day. On the February 20 episode of NXT, Valkyria told Paxley that if she stayed backstage during her title match that night, she would give Paxley a surprise, which she did. A week later, Valkyria revealed that after speaking with NXT General Manager Ava, Valkyria and Paxley would face The Kabuki Warriors (Asuka and Kairi Sane) for the WWE Women's Tag Team Championship at Roadblock, which was later made official.

At Vengeance Day on February 4, Bron Breakker and Baron Corbin defeated Carmelo Hayes and Trick Williams to win the 2024 men's Dusty Rhodes Tag Team Classic final and went on to defeat The Family (Tony D'Angelo and Channing "Stacks" Lorenzo) to win the NXT Tag Team Championship. A week later, a match was made between Chase University (Duke Hudson and Andre Chase) and Axiom and Nathan Frazer, with the winners becoming the #1 contenders for the NXT Tag Team Championship, where Chase U won the match. The title match was then announced for Roadblock.

== Event ==
The first match was a Asylum match, and Donovan Dijak won the match, defeating Joe Gacy via pinfall.

The second match was an NXT Tag Team Championship match, where Bron Breakker and Baron Corbin have defeated Chase University (Andre Chase and Duke Hudson) via pinfall to retain the titles.

The third match saw Shawn Spears defeating Uriah Connors via pinfall.

The fourth match was a WWE Women's Tag Team Championship match, by which The Kabuki Warriors (Asuka and Kairi Sane) won and retained the titles by defeating Lyra Valkyria and Tatum Paxley via pinfall.

The fifth match was where Fallon Henley has defeated Blair Davenport via pinfall

The main event (sixth match) was Tony D'Angelo vs. Carmelo Hayes, the winner would determine the number one contender for the NXT Championship at Stand & Deliver. D'Angelo won this match, defeating Hayes via pinfall.

== Results ==
No.	Results	Stipulations	Times
1	Donovan Dijak defeated Joe Gacy by pinfall	Asylum match	12:46
2	Bron Breakker and Baron Corbin (c) defeated Chase University (Andre Chase and Duke Hudson) (with Riley Osborne) by pinfall	Tag team match for the NXT Tag Team Championship	11:18
3	Shawn Spears defeated Uriah Connors by pinfall	Singles match	1:12
4	The Kabuki Warriors (Asuka and Kairi Sane) (c) defeated Lyra Valkyria and Tatum Paxley by pinfall	Tag team match for the WWE Women's Tag Team Championship	13:14
5	Fallon Henley defeated Blair Davenport by pinfall	Singles match	3:28
6	Tony D'Angelo defeated Carmelo Hayes by pinfall	Singles match to determine the #1 contender for the NXT Championship at Stand & Deliver	10:34
(c) / – the champion(s) heading into the match
