= WWE Roadblock =

WWE special event series

- WWE Roadblock 2025 logo
- Promotions: WWE
- Brands: Raw (December 2016); NXT (2022–present)
- Other names: Roadblock: End of the Line (2016); NXT Roadblock (2022–2024)
- First event: Roadblock (March 2016)

WWE Roadblock is a professional wrestling event series produced by WWE, a Connecticut-based professional wrestling promotion. The event was established in March 2016, and this inaugural event was simply titled Roadblock and aired exclusively on the WWE Network streaming service. The second event was then held in December 2016 under the name Roadblock: End of the Line where in addition to the WWE Network, it also aired on traditional pay-per-view (PPV) outlets. To coincide with the brand extension reintroduced in July 2016, this second event was held exclusively for wrestlers from the Raw brand. Roadblock was discontinued after this second event; however, in 2022, WWE revived the event for its developmental brand NXT, and it has since been held annually in March as a television special episode of the NXT program.

The event's title is a reference to its scheduling. The first event was titled as a reference to its original March position on the "Road to WrestleMania". With the second event held in December, its title was in reference to it being WWE's final PPV and livestreaming event of 2016. Since 2022, its title has been in reference to its position on the road to NXT Stand & Deliver, the brand's annual WrestleMania week event.

== History ==
The American professional wrestling promotion WWE originally had a house show scheduled for March 12, 2016, at the Ricoh Coliseum in Toronto, Ontario, Canada, and was titled "March to WrestleMania: Live from Toronto." To further build towards the following month's WrestleMania 32, WWE decided to broadcast the event live and exclusively on their online streaming service, the WWE Network. They also renamed the event to Roadblock, which was a reference to its position on the "Road to WrestleMania".

In July that year, WWE reintroduced the brand extension where they again split their roster between the Raw and SmackDown brands where wrestlers were exclusively assigned to perform. Brand-exclusive pay-per-views (PPV) also returned. The Roadblock name was in turn reused for the Raw-exclusive December PPV and WWE Network event. It was titled Roadblock: End of the Line due to it being the final PPV of the year. This would also be the final event to carry the Roadblock name as Roadblock was quietly discontinued with no event scheduled for 2017.

The Roadblock name was revived for the developmental brand NXT for a special episode of NXT on March 8, 2022, as "NXT Roadblock"; this event served as a lead-in to that year's Stand & Deliver livestreaming event, NXT's WrestleMania weekend show. Roadblock has since been held as an annual television special of NXT with its name in reference to the road to Stand & Deliver. The name reverted to WWE Roadblock in 2025 as all major NXT events have used the promotion's logo instead of the brand's logo since NXT moved to The CW in October 2024. The event was supposed to return in 2026 at Madison Square Garden in New York City, New York on March 31, however, after Stand & Deliver was announced to take place on April 4, two weeks before the WrestleMania week as usual and just four days after Roadblock, WWE quietly stopped to promote the event as such, with the episode becoming a regular NXT episode.

== Events ==
Raw-branded event	NXT-branded event

#	Event	Date	City	Venue	Main event	Ref.
1	Roadblock (2016)	March 12, 2016	Toronto, Ontario, Canada	Ricoh Coliseum	Triple H (c) vs. Dean Ambrose for the WWE World Heavyweight Championship	
2	Roadblock: End of the Line	December 18, 2016	Pittsburgh, Pennsylvania	PPG Paints Arena	Kevin Owens (c) vs. Roman Reigns for the WWE Universal Championship	
3	NXT Roadblock (2022)	March 8, 2022	Orlando, Florida	WWE Performance Center	Bron Breakker (c) vs. Tommaso Ciampa vs. Dolph Ziggler in a triple threat match for the NXT Championship	
4	NXT Roadblock (2023)	March 7, 2023	Orlando, Florida	WWE Performance Center	Roxanne Perez (c) vs. Meiko Satomura for the NXT Women's Championship	
5	NXT Roadblock (2024)	March 5, 2024	Orlando, Florida	WWE Performance Center	Tony D'Angelo vs. Carmelo Hayes for an NXT Championship match at NXT Stand & Deliver	
6	NXT Roadblock (2025)	March 11, 2025	New York City, New York	Infosys Theater at Madison Square Garden (Note: In 2025, the venue was called The Theater at Madison Square Garden.)	Giulia (NXT) vs. Stephanie Vaquer (North American) in a Winner Takes All match for the NXT Women's Championship and NXT Women's North American Championship	
(c) – refers to the champion(s) heading into the match

== See also ==
- List of WWE NXT special episodes
- List of WWE pay-per-view and livestreaming supercards
