= NXT: Roadblock (2023) =

WWE television special

- Promotion: WWE
- Brand: NXT
- Date: March 7, 2023
- City: Orlando, Florida
- Venue: WWE Performance Center

NXT special episodes chronology
← Previous; New Year's Evil	Next → Spring Breakin'

Roadblock chronology
← Previous; 2022	Next → 2024

The 2023 NXT: Roadblock was a professional wrestling television special produced by WWE, held exclusively for wrestlers from the promotion's developmental brand, NXT. It was NXT's second annual Roadblock, and WWE's fourth overall, and aired as a special episode of the weekly series NXT on the USA Network. The event was broadcast live on March 7, 2023, from NXT's home venue, the WWE Performance Center in Orlando, Florida for a second consecutive year. Its title was a reference to its position on the road to Stand & Deliver, NXT's WrestleMania week event.

Five matches were contested at the event. In the main event, Roxanne Perez defeated Meiko Satomura to retain the NXT Women's Championship. The event also saw the WWE debut of Dragon Lee.

== Production ==
=== Background ===
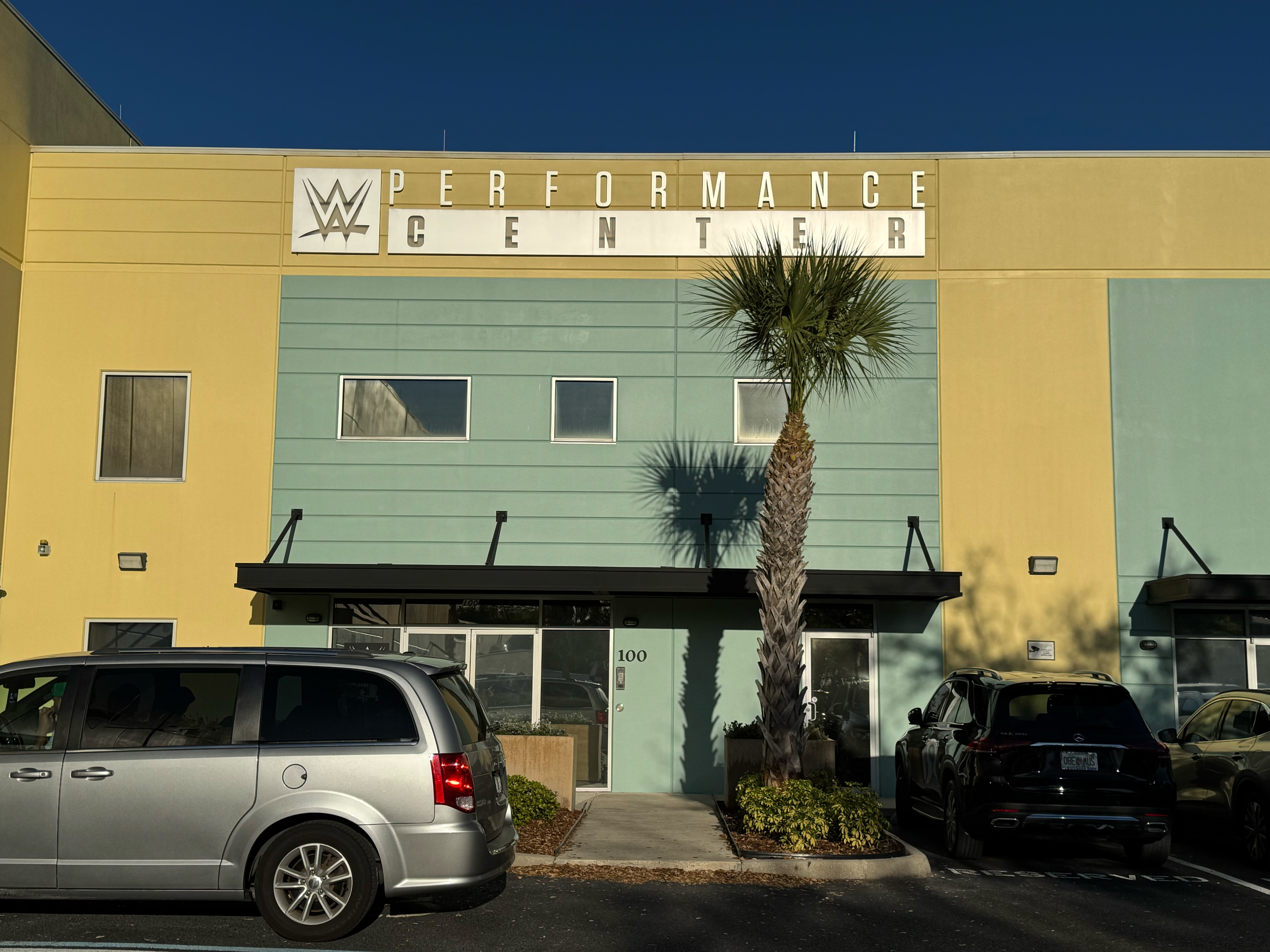
NXT's second annual Roadblock was held at the brand's home venue, the WWE Performance Center in Orlando, Florida for a second consecutive year.

Roadblock is a professional wrestling event established by WWE in 2016. After the first two events were held for the main roster in March 2016 and December 2016, respectively, Roadblock was discontinued. However, in March 2022, the event was reinstated for WWE's developmental brand, NXT, as a television special episode of NXT titled NXT: Roadblock, with its name being a reference to its position on the road to that year's Stand & Deliver, NXT's WrestleMania week event. On the February 14, 2023, episode of NXT, the brand's second Roadblock, and WWE's fourth Roadblock overall, was scheduled as the March 7, 2023, episode of NXT on the USA Network, held at NXT's home venue, the WWE Performance Center in Orlando, Florida for a second consecutive year, with this year's event being positioned on the road to the 2023 Stand & Deliver. This in turn established Roadblock as an annual television special for NXT.

=== Storylines ===
The card included matches that resulted from scripted storylines. Results were predetermined by WWE's writers on the NXT brand, while storylines were produced on the weekly television program, NXT, and the supplementary online streaming show, Level Up.

On the February 14 episode of NXT, after winning their tag team match, Meiko Satomura challenged Roxanne Perez to an NXT Women's Championship match, which Perez accepted. The following week, the bout was made official for Roadblock.

On the December 27, 2022, episode of NXT, Tony D'Angelo lost his NXT North American Championship match after interference from Dijak. At NXT: New Year's Evil on January 10, 2023, Dijak defeated D'Angelo to become the number one contender for the title at NXT Vengeance Day. At the event, Dijak failed to win the title after interference from D'Angelo and Channing "Stacks" Lorenzo. On the February 21 episode, D'Angelo challenged Dijak to a Jailhouse Street Fight at Roadblock, which Dijak accepted a week later.

At NXT Vengeance Day, Toxic Attraction members Gigi Dolin and Jacy Jayne failed to win the NXT Women's Championship in a triple threat match. On the following episode of NXT, during a "Ding Dong, Hello!" segment hosted by Bayley, Jayne attacked Dolin, breaking up Toxic Attraction. Over the next few weeks, Dolin and Jayne talked about their breakup and on the February 28 episode, a match between the two was scheduled for Roadblock.

At NXT Vengeance Day, Grayson Waller failed to win the NXT Championship in a Steel Cage match. After the event, he stormed into Shawn Michaels' office, resulting in him being suspended for a week. After more confrontations, on the February 21 episode of NXT, Waller told Michaels to meet him face-to-face at Roadblock, which was confirmed the following week.

On the February 7 episode of NXT, Ava of Schism (Joe Gacy, Jagger Reid, and Rip Fowler) attacked Thea Hail of Chase University (Andre Chase and Duke Hudson) backstage. Later that night, Chase and Hudson lost their match after Hail showed up with Schism smiley faces. The two teams continued their feud over the following weeks and on the February 28 episode, a Chase University class was interrupted by Schism. Later that night, a match between Chase and Gacy was scheduled for Roadblock.

At NXT: New Year's Evil, Jinder Mahal made his return to NXT to defeat Julius Creed; the match was originally The Creed Brothers (Julius and Brutus Creed) vs. Indus Sher (Sanga and Veer Mahaan). The match eventually occurred on the January 31 episode of NXT, where Indus Sher were victorious. Two weeks later, Mahal challenged Bron Breakker for the NXT Championship, and the match was scheduled for the February 21 episode, where Breakker retained. On the February 28 episode, a six-man tag team match pitting Breakker and The Creed Brothers against Indus Sher (Mahal, Mahaan, and Sanga) was scheduled for Roadblock.

== Event ==
=== Preliminary matches ===
The television special began with Tony D'Angelo (accompanied by Channing "Stacks" Lorenzo) taking on Dijak in a Jailhouse Street Fight. The rules were that there was no disqualifications, and that the match could only end when an opponent is locked in a cell. In the closing stages, with Lorenzo knocked out, as Dijak tried to drag D'Angelo into the cell after performing Feast Your Eyes, D'Angelo found a crowbar and struck Dijak with it before dragging him into the cell and slamming the door shut to win the match.

Next, NXT Tag Team Champions Gallus (Mark Coffey and Wolfgang) called out Pretty Deadly (Kit Wilson and Elton Prince), who appeared from an elevated platform. After Gallus laid out the title belts in the ring, Wilson and Prince tried to retrieve them, only for Gallus to beat them down and send them retreating. It was later announced that an NXT Tag Team Championship match between Gallus and Pretty Deadly was made official for the following week.

In the next match, The Creed Brothers (Brutus Creed and Julius Creed) and NXT Champion Bron Breakker (accompanied by Ivy Nile) took on Jinder Mahal and Indus Sher (Veer Mahaan and Sanga) in a six-man tag team match. Before the match, a brawl broke out between the two teams. In the closing moments, Breakker performed a Spear on Mahal before doing the same to Sanga. Mahaan was able to stun Breakker, however, The Creed Brothers performed a Doomsday Brutus Ball on Mahaan to win the match.

Afterwards, Grayson Waller hosted The Waller Effect, with Shawn Michaels as the special guest. After the two talked about Michaels being in charge of NXT since September 2022, Michaels mentioned the legends NXT had created over the last few years. Waller then challenged Michaels to a match at NXT Stand & Deliver, but Michaels said that someone else would like to do it more. That person was revealed to be Johnny Gargano, in his first NXT appearance since December 2021. Gargano then cleared Waller from the ring before standing tall with Michaels to end the segment.

In the third match, Gigi Dolin took on Jacy Jayne. In the end, Dolin performed a rollup slam on Jayne to win the match. After the match, Jayne attacked Dolin and wrapped her head in a chair, only to be sent to the back by referees.

After that, NXT Champion Bron Breakker challenged Carmelo Hayes to a match at NXT Stand & Deliver. After the two hyped the match, Hayes accepted, but on the condition that Breakker put the title on the line.

In the penultimate match, Andre Chase (accompanied by Thea Hail and Duke Hudson) took on Joe Gacy (accompanied by Ava, Jagger Reid, and Rip Fowler). In the climax, while Hail did her breathing exercise and got at Ava's face, Hudson and Chase were distracted by that, allowing Gacy to perform the Upside-Down World on Chase to win the match.

Before the main event, NXT North American Champion Wes Lee was about to make another open challenge for the title, but was interrupted by Axiom. Lee told him that if he wanted the match, he would have to beat the entire locker room.

=== Main event ===
In the main event, Roxanne Perez defended the NXT Women's Championship against Meiko Satomura. After an even match between the two, Satomura performed a handstand legdrop for a nearfall. In the climax, Perez attempted Pop Rocks, but Satomura blocked by grabbing onto the ring apron. Back in the ring, Satomura performed Scorpio Rising on Perez, who grabbed the bottom rope to void the pin. As Satomura attempted a second Scorpio Rising, Perez countered into a roll-up to retain the title. After the match, Satomura passed the NXT Women's Championship belt to Perez, who suddenly collapsed. Perez was then taken out of the arena in an ambulance, while nodding her head to say that she was okay, as the show ended.

== Aftermath ==
On the following episode of NXT, WWE executive Shawn Michaels issued a statement via Twitter that NXT Women's Champion Roxanne Perez was discharged from the hospital, however, after numerous tests, her health was still in question. As such, Michaels announced a ladder match at Stand & Deliver to crown a new NXT Women's Champion, with qualifying matches beginning that same episode. On the March 28 episode, Perez stated that she collapsed due to anxiety, and that she had been cleared by the doctors to return. She was then added to the ladder match, turning it into a title defense.

Also on NXT, Gallus (Mark Coffey and Wolfgang) and Pretty Deadly (Kit Wilson and Elton Prince) had their match for the NXT Tag Team Championship, where Gallus retained.

Johnny Gargano talked about his return to NXT, and about missing a part of himself when he returned to Raw in August 2022. He also mentioned Waller disrespecting the fans and NXT when commentator Vic Joseph showed footage of Waller watching the show from Gargano's home. This led to a brawl between Gargano and Waller outside the house, which Waller got the better of. The following week, Gargano came up with a contract for an unsanctioned match between him and Waller, but Waller said that he would only sign it on the March 28 episode if Gargano did not show up at the building, and Gargano accepted. On that episode, Waller signed the contract to make the unsanctioned match stipulation official.

NXT North American Champion Wes Lee's open challenge turned into a massive brawl, which Lee got the better of. Later that night, Shawn Michaels announced that Lee would be defending the title in a fatal five-way match at Stand & Deliver, with Lee selecting his opponents. The following week, Lee chose Dragon Lee, JD McDonagh, and Ilja Dragunov as his opponents. The final spot was filled in a battle royal on the March 28 episode, which was won by Axiom.

As Chase University (Andre Chase, Duke Hudson, Thea Hail, and Tyler Bate) were talking backstage, Schism's (Joe Gacy, Jagger Reid, and Rip Fowler) Ava put her mask on Chase University's speakerphone. The following week, the two teams agreed to an eight-person mixed tag team match for Stand & Deliver where the winning team would gain control of Chase University.

== Results ==
No.	Results	Stipulations	Times
1	Tony D'Angelo (with Channing "Stacks" Lorenzo) defeated Dijak	Jailhouse Street Fight	11:11
2	Bron Breakker and The Creed Brothers (Brutus Creed and Julius Creed) (with Ivy Nile) defeated Indus Sher (Jinder Mahal, Sanga, and Veer Mahaan) by pinfall	Six-man tag team match	11:14
3	Gigi Dolin defeated Jacy Jayne by pinfall	Singles match	8:01
4	Joe Gacy (with Schism (Rip Fowler, Jagger Reid, and Ava)) defeated Andre Chase (with Chase University (Duke Hudson and Thea Hail)) by pinfall	Singles match	4:27
5	Roxanne Perez (c) defeated Meiko Satomura by pinfall	Singles match for the NXT Women's Championship	13:59
(c) / – the champion(s) heading into the match
