= NXT: New Year's Evil (2022) =

WWE television special

- NXT: New Year's Evil 2022 logo
- Promotion: WWE
- Brand: NXT 2.0
- Date: January 4, 2022
- City: Orlando, Florida
- Venue: WWE Performance Center

NXT special episodes chronology
← Previous; Halloween Havoc	Next → Vengeance Day

NXT: New Year's Evil chronology
← Previous; 2021	Next → 2023

The 2022 NXT: New Year's Evil was a professional wrestling television special produced by WWE, held exclusively for wrestlers from the promotion's developmental brand, NXT 2.0. It was WWE's second annual NXT: New Year's Evil, and the third New Year's Evil overall, and aired as a special episode of the weekly series NXT 2.0 on the USA Network. The event took place on January 4, 2022, at NXT's home venue, the WWE Performance Center in Orlando, Florida for a second consecutive year.

This was the final event to feature the NXT Cruiserweight Championship, as it was unified into the NXT North American Championship during the show. This was also the first New Year's Evil held since NXT was rebranded as NXT 2.0 in September 2021, reverting it to a developmental brand for WWE. This rebranding to NXT 2.0 also phased out the Capitol Wrestling Center name for the arena within the WWE Performance Center.

Four matches were contested at the event. In the main event, Bron Breakker defeated Tommaso Ciampa to win the NXT Championship. In other prominent matches, Mandy Rose defeated Cora Jade and Raquel González to retain the NXT Women's Championship, and in the opening bout, North American Champion Carmelo Hayes defeated Cruiserweight Champion Roderick Strong to unify both titles, retiring the Cruiserweight Championship. The event also saw an appearance by Rick Steiner, who had not appeared in the company since 1994; after the event went off-air, Steiner celebrated with his son, Bron Breakker, after he had won the NXT Championship.

== Production ==
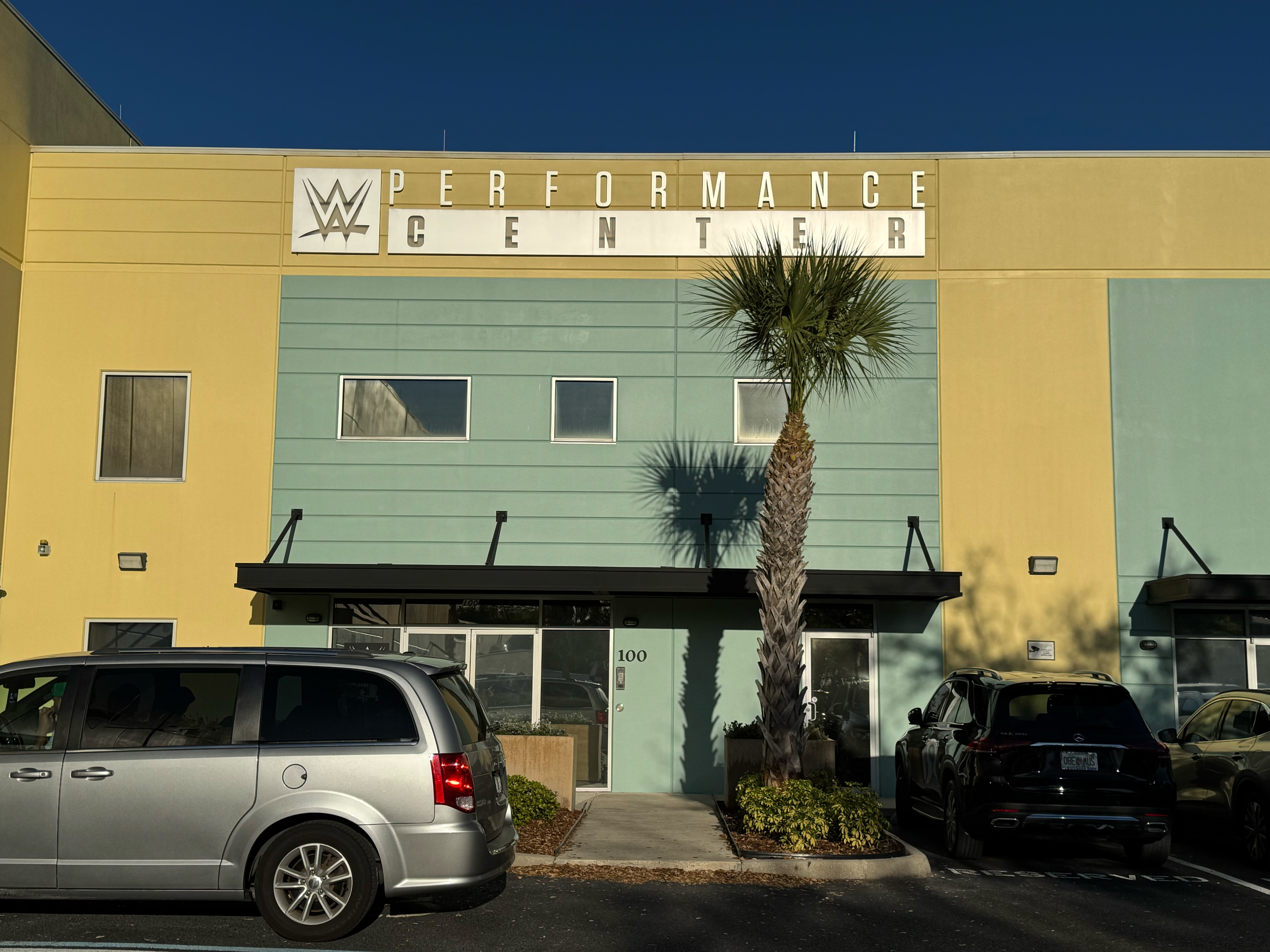
The second annual NXT: New Year's Evil, and third New Year's Evil overall, was held at NXT's home venue, the WWE Performance Center in Orlando, Florida for a second consecutive year.

=== Background ===
New Year's Evil is a professional wrestling television special held around New Year's. It was originally produced by the former World Championship Wrestling (WCW) as a special episode of its Monday Nitro program on December 27, 1999; this was the only New Year's Evil held by WCW, and then in March 2001, WCW was acquired by WWE, at the time still known as the World Wrestling Federation (WWF; renamed WWE in 2002). After 21 years since that WCW event, WWE reinstated New Year's Evil for its developmental brand, NXT, which was held as a special episode of NXT on January 6, 2021.

At WarGames on December 5, 2021, it was announced that a second NXT: New Year's Evil, and third New Year's Evil overall, would be held as the January 4, 2022, episode of NXT 2.0 on the USA Network, and would take place at NXT's home venue, the WWE Performance Center in Orlando, Florida for a second consecutive year. This in turn established New Year's Evil as an annual television special of NXT. This also marked the first New Year's Evil held since NXT was rebranded as NXT 2.0 in September 2021, which reverted it to a developmental brand for WWE. This rebranding also phased out the Capitol Wrestling Center name for the arena within the WWE Performance Center.

=== Storylines ===
The card included four matches that resulted from scripted storylines. Results were predetermined by WWE's writers on the NXT brand, while storylines were produced on their weekly television program, NXT.

On October 26, 2021, at NXT: Halloween Havoc, Tommaso Ciampa defeated Bron Breakker to successfully retain the NXT Championship. At WarGames, Breakker's team defeated Ciampa's team in a WarGames match when Breakker pinned Ciampa. On the December 21 episode of NXT, Ciampa told Breakker that he earned his second chance at the title, and would get it at New Year's Evil.

At NXT: Halloween Havoc, Mandy Rose defeated Raquel González in a Chucky's choice Trick or Street Fight match to win the NXT Women's Championship. At WarGames, Cora Jade, Io Shirai, Kay Lee Ray, and González defeated Toxic Attraction (Rose, Gigi Dolin, and Jacy Jayne) and Dakota Kai in a WarGames match, with Jade pinning Jayne to win for her team. On the December 21 episode of NXT, after beating Kai in a Street Fight match, González called out Rose to demand a title rematch but got Jade instead. Moments later, Rose appeared on the TitanTron to challenge both of them in a triple threat match for the title at New Year's Evil. On the December 28 episode, Rose arranged a tag team match pitting Jade and González against Shirai and Ray for that episode's main event, where the winning team got to challenge her for the title at New Year's Evil. The match was won by Jade and González.

Raw roster member AJ Styles was scheduled for an appearance on the December 21 episode of NXT after Grayson Waller went after him on social media. On that subsequent episode, Styles praised the talent on NXT except for Waller. Waller was about to attack Styles, but backed off. Waller then made a surprise appearance on the following Raw, where he confronted Styles from the front row during Styles's promo and held a sign that said, "The Grayson Waller Effect is Phenomenal". Waller stated that he visited Raw in response to Styles's visit to NXT. Styles responded by saying that Raw is where stars are made, and Waller was "not a star". At NXT the next day following Waller's match, Styles appeared on the TitanTron and told Waller that he got the wrong type of attention on Raw. Styles then stated that he would see Waller at New Year's Evil.

At NXT: Halloween Havoc, Imperium (Fabian Aichner and Marcel Barthel) defeated MSK (Nash Carter and Wes Lee) in a Lumber Jack-o'-Lantern match to win the NXT Tag Team Championship for a second time. The following month saw Carter and Lee go on a journey to find the person responsible for the legend of MSK called "The Shaman". On the December 7 episode of NXT, The Shaman was revealed to be Raw roster member Matt Riddle, who helped them find themselves on their way to regaining the tag title. On the December 28 episode, MSK returned and called out Imperium, who said they were the best tag team in the division. Walter then appeared on the TitanTron and said that Imperium showed "dignity and respect" to the tag title, and MSK did not deserve a title match but a beating from his hands. Riddle then appeared on the TitanTron and proposed a six-man tag team match between him and MSK against Imperium, which Walter accepted.

On the September 21 episode of NXT, Roderick Strong defeated Kushida to win the NXT Cruiserweight Championship. Three weeks later, Carmelo Hayes cashed in his NXT Breakout Tournament contract and defeated Isaiah "Swerve" Scott to win the NXT North American Championship. After the two men brawled with each other on the December 21 episode of NXT, Malcolm Bivens challenged Hayes to a match on Strong's behalf, leading to a contract signing the following week, which would be a championship unification match at New Year's Evil.

== Event ==
=== Preliminary matches ===
The television special began with NXT Cruiserweight Champion Roderick Strong (accompanied by Hachiman and Malcolm Bivens) taking on NXT North American Champion Carmelo Hayes (accompanied by Trick Williams) to unify both titles. The two began with chain wrestling, which was dominated by Hayes. In the climax, after more back-and-forth action, Strong prevented a diving leg drop attempt and went for a superplex, but Hayes countered into a cutter on Strong, who got the worst of the impact. Hayes then performed a diving leg drop on Strong to win the match and unify the titles. The NXT Cruiserweight Championship was immediately retired, with Hayes being recognized as the final NXT Cruiserweight Champion and going forward as the North American Champion.

Following this, the 2022 Men's and Women's Dusty Rhodes Tag Team Classic tournaments were announced, with the women's tournament beginning in February and the men's tournament beginning in two weeks.

After that, AJ Styles made his advertised appearance. Styles talked about his championship wins, but also having a few regrets. He mentioned his WWE debut at the 2016 Royal Rumble, but never went through NXT. Styles stated that NXT had something special, which was the passion of the fans and wrestlers. Styles talked about Grayson Waller being bigger and better than this place when Waller interrupted. Waller talked about Styles' loss to Omos the previous night on Raw, stating that Styles lost that night because he was thinking about Waller. Styles then stated that he was not 100% ready for a fight. Waller then teased a fight, but preferred that they have a match as the main event of the following episode of NXT. Afterwards, Styles and Waller brawled, with Styles getting the upper hand after performing a Pele Kick. Styles attempted a Phenomenal Forearm, but Waller backed away to end the segment.

Next, a backstage segment took place where Amari Miller talked with Kacy Catanzaro and Kayden Carter. Catanzaro and Carter talked about winning the Women's Dusty Rhodes Tag Team Classic tournament before Indi Hartwell and Persia Pirotta interrupted, challenging them and Miller to a match for the following episode of NXT. Tiffany Stratton passed up the offer of being Hartwell and Pirotta's partner, that spot being filled by Wendy Choo.

In the second match, Imperium (Walter and NXT Tag Team Champions Fabian Aichner and Marcel Barthel) took on MSK (Wes Lee and Nash Carter) and Raw Tag Team Champion Riddle. Imperium dominated the early moments until Lee tagged in. Aichner performed a lariat on Lee. Lee ducked Aichner and tagged in Riddle before Walter tagged in. Walter then dominated Lee and Carter before Aichner and Barthel performed stereo Tree of Woe dropkicks on Lee. In the climax, Riddle escaped a European Bomb attempt before performing a High Knee on Barthel. Riddle performed a German Suplex on Walter. Lee and Carter performed a Dommsday Blockbuster on Aichner. Riddle then performed a corkscrew senton on Aichner before performing an RKO on Barthel to win the match.

In the penultimate match, Mandy Rose defended the NXT Women's Championship against Cora Jade and Raquel González in a triple threat match. Rose arrived at the Performance Center with a helicopter, while González entered the Performance Center on a motorcycle. After González dominated Jade and Rose, Rose brought the fight to González before Jade cleared Rose from the ring. Later, Jade performed a hurricanrana on González before doing the same to Rose. González performed a backbreaker on Jade before lifting her up and throwing her out of the ring. González then brought Rose, who tried to escape, back inside the ring. Rose performed a Codebreaker on González for a nearfall. In the closing moments, González performed a Chingona Bomb on Rose, but Jade broke up the pin with a senton. González went for a superplex on Jade, but Jade shoved González off the top rope. Jade then tried to pin Rose, however, Rose countered into her own pinning combination to retain the title.

Before the main event, Andre Chase talked about being grateful for one of his Chase University students protecting him the previous week and for Harland not throwing that student off the roof before Von Wagner interrupted. Wagner stated that he was the real star of NXT before attacking Chase. Wagner then attacked a few Chase University students in attendance before being escorted to the back to end the segment.

=== Main event ===
In the main event, Tommaso Ciampa defended the NXT Championship against Bron Breakker. While Breakker made his entrance, he broke a giant X, signaling how a new era of NXT was starting. After an evenly contested match between the two, Ciampa attempted a DDT on Breakker onto the exposed concrete, but Breakker countered and performed an Alabama Slam on Ciampa through the announce table. Back inside the ring, Breakker performed a Military Press Powerslam on Ciampa, who grabbed the bottom rope to break the pin. Ciampa then kicked the ropes into Breakker's midsection and followed up with two Running Knees and a Fairytale ending on Breakker for a nearfall. In the closing moments, Ciampa attempted an Air Raid Crash on Breakker from the second rope, but Breakker shoved him off and followed up with a diving bulldog. Breakker forced Ciampa to submit to the Steiner Recliner to win the title for the first time. After the event went off the air, Breakker's father, Rick Steiner, who had not appeared in WWE since 1994, celebrated the moment with Breakker.

== Aftermath ==
New NXT Champion Bron Breakker opened the following episode of NXT to talk about his win at NXT: New Year's Evil. Breakker gave thanks to Tommaso Ciampa for congratulating him on his win and paying respect to Breakker's father, Rick Steiner. Breakker then stated that he would prove why he was the champion every week.

Also on NXT, Wendy Choo (in her first WWE match), Indi Hartwell, and Persia Pirotta defeated Amari Miller, Kacy Catanzaro, and Kayden Carter.

After Von Wagner attacked Andre Chase and the Chase University students in attendance at NXT: New Year's Evil, it was revealed that the WWE disciplinary committee had fined and suspended Wagner indefinitely. However, later that night, it was revealed that Wagner paid his fine and that the suspension was lifted.

AJ Styles and Grayson Waller had their match on the following episode of NXT, where Styles was victorious. After the match, Styles called Waller "good, but not phenomenal." He then introduced one of Waller's friends, which was revealed to be LA Knight, in his first appearance since being attacked by Waller in the parking lot on the December 14, 2021, episode of NXT. Knight then attacked Waller before standing tall with Styles as the show ended. This resulted in Knight and Waller continuing their rivalry.

MSK (Wes Lee and Nash Carter) entered the 2022 Men's Dusty Rhodes Tag Team Classic and made it to the finals at Vengeance Day, where they were eliminated by The Creed Brothers (Brutus Creed and Julius Creed). At NXT: Roadblock, MSK replaced The Creed Brothers after the latter were mysteriously attacked backstage and took on defending champions Imperium (Fabian Aichner and Marcel Barthel) for the NXT Tag Team Championship, only for the match to end in a no-contest when The Creed Brothers attacked both teams, making a triple threat tag team match between the three teams for the titles being made official for NXT Stand & Deliver on April 2.

After Cora Jade and Raquel González failed to defeat Mandy Rose for the NXT Women's Championship, González initially rejected Jade's offer to be her partner in the 2022 Women's Dusty Rhodes Tag Team Classic. On the February 1 episode of NXT, González defeated Jade, after which, González accepted Jade's offer to be her partner in the tournament. They then spent the next few weeks preparing for the tournament. They made it to the semifinals at NXT: Roadblock, where they were eliminated after interference from NXT Women's Tag Team Champions Toxic Attraction (Gigi Dolin and Jacy Jayne). A week later, Jade stole the title belts from Rose, Dolin, and Jayne, but was attacked by Rose in the parking lot, setting up a match between Jade and Rose for the NXT Women's Championship at Stand & Deliver. On the March 29 episode, González saved Dakota Kai from a 3-on-1 beatdown by Rose, Dolin, and Jayne, leading to a match pitting Dolin and Jayne against González and Kai for the NXT Women's Tag Team Championship at Stand & Deliver.

== Results ==
No.	Results	Stipulations	Times
1	Carmelo Hayes (North American Champion) (with Trick Williams) defeated Roderick Strong (Cruiserweight Champion) (with Hachiman and Malcolm Bivens) by pinfall	Singles match to unify the NXT North American Championship and NXT Cruiserweight Championship	15:29
2	Matt Riddle and MSK (Nash Carter and Wes Lee) defeated Imperium (Walter, Fabian Aichner, and Marcel Barthel) by pinfall	Six-man tag team match	13:50
3	Mandy Rose (c) defeated Cora Jade and Raquel González by pinfall	Triple threat match for the NXT Women's Championship	12:33
4	Bron Breakker defeated Tommaso Ciampa (c) by submission	Singles match for the NXT Championship	15:27
(c) / – the champion(s) heading into the match
