= NXT: Roadblock (2022) =

WWE television special

- Promotion poster featuring Tommaso Ciampa, Bron Breakker, and Dolph Ziggler
- Promotion: WWE
- Brand: NXT 2.0
- Date: March 8, 2022
- City: Orlando, Florida
- Venue: WWE Performance Center

NXT special episodes chronology
| ← Previous; Vengeance Day | Next → Spring Breakin' |

Roadblock chronology
| ← Previous; Roadblock: End of the Line | Next → 2023 |

The 2022 NXT: Roadblock was a professional wrestling television special produced by WWE, held for wrestlers from the promotion's developmental brand, NXT 2.0. It was NXT's first annual Roadblock, and WWE's third overall, and aired as a special episode of the weekly series NXT 2.0 on the USA Network. The event was broadcast live on March 8, 2022, from NXT's home venue, the WWE Performance Center in Orlando, Florida. Its title was a reference to its position on the road to Stand & Deliver, NXT's WrestleMania week event.

Six matches were contested at the event. In the main event, Raw's Dolph Ziggler defeated defending champion Bron Breakker and Tommaso Ciampa to win the NXT Championship. In other prominent matches, Grayson Waller defeated LA Knight in a Last Man Standing match, and Imperium (Fabian Aichner and Marcel Barthel) vs. MSK (Wes Lee and Nash Carter) ended in a no-contest, thus Imperium retained the NXT Tag Team Championship.

This was the first Roadblock held since Roadblock: End of the Line in December 2016. It was also the first to be broadcast as a television special, as the inaugural event in March 2016 was a WWE Network livestreaming special for the main roster while End of the Line, which was held exclusively for Raw, was broadcast on pay-per-view and the WWE Network.

== Production ==
=== Background ===
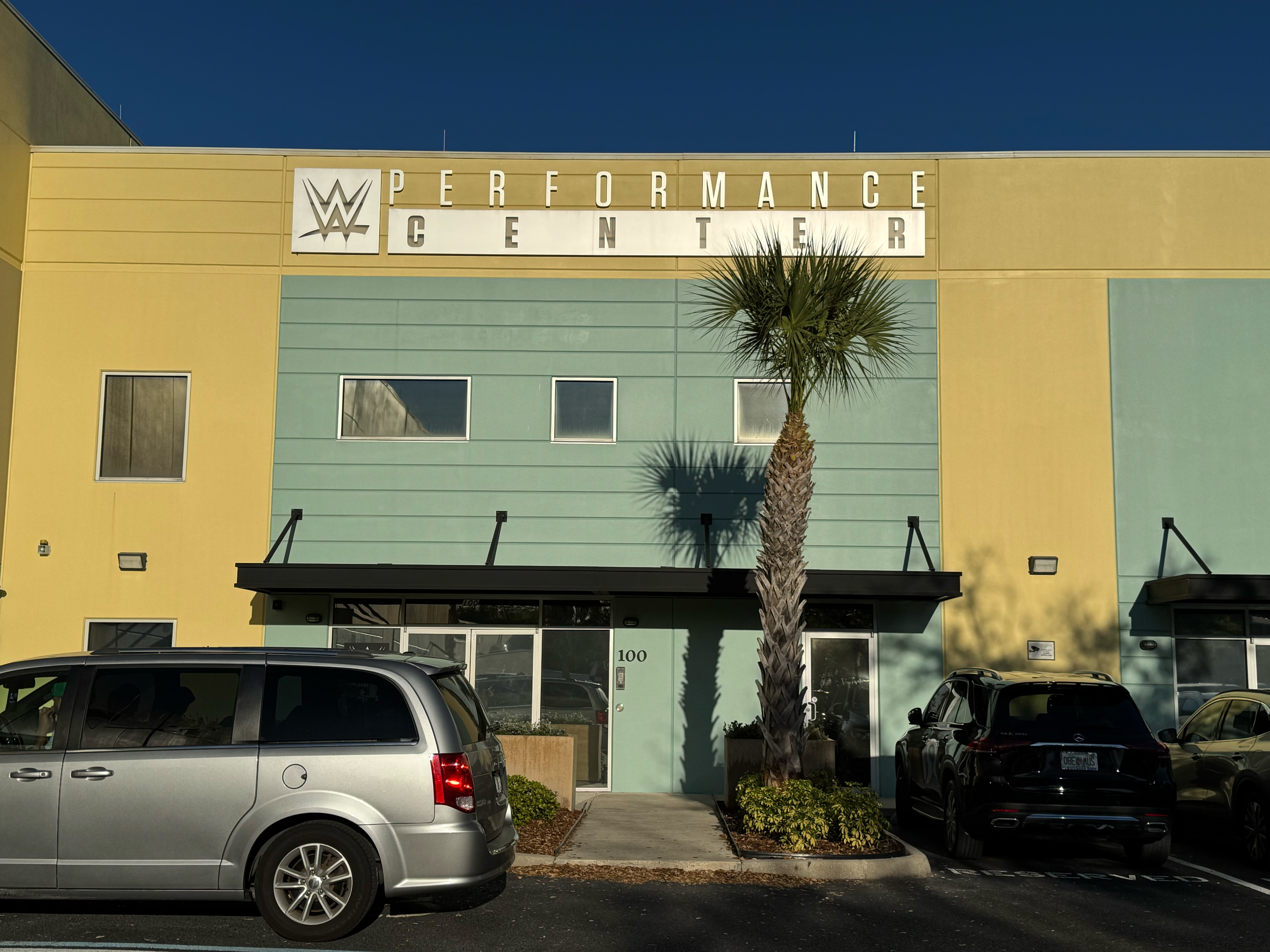
NXT's inaugural Roadblock was held at the brand's home venue, the WWE Performance Center in Orlando, Florida.

Roadblock is a professional wrestling event established by WWE in 2016. The inaugural event was held in March that year and was livestreamed exclusively on the WWE Network. The event's name was a reference to its position on the "Road to WrestleMania". In July 2016, WWE reintroduced the brand extension, where the roster was divided between brands where wrestlers were exclusively assigned to perform. Roadblock was brought back that same year in December as a Raw-exclusive event under the title Roadblock: End of the Line. It aired on pay-per-view (PPV) and the WWE Network with its name being in reference to being WWE's final PPV and livestreaming event of 2016. Roadblock was then discontinued.

During the March 1, 2022, episode of NXT 2.0, it was announced that Roadblock had been reinstated for WWE's developmental brand, NXT 2.0, under the title NXT: Roadblock, with its title being in reference to its position on the road to NXT Stand & Deliver, the brand's WrestleMania week event. Unlike the previous two Roadblock events, NXT: Roadblock was scheduled to be held as a special episode of NXT, with the television special airing on March 8 on the USA Network. The event took place at NXT's home venue, the WWE Performance Center in Orlando, Florida.

=== Storylines ===
The card included matches that resulted from scripted storylines. Results were predetermined by WWE's writers on the NXT brand, while storylines were produced on WWE's weekly television program, NXT 2.0, and the supplementary online streaming show, Level Up.

On the February 8 episode of NXT, Raw roster member Dolph Ziggler appeared to crash the championship summit between Santos Escobar and NXT Champion Bron Breakker. Ziggler confronted Breakker over his comments on Twitter, and said that he never held the NXT Championship before. The segment ended with Ziggler and Tommaso Ciampa brawling at ringside, leaving Breakker to get powerbombed through a table by Legado Del Fantasma (Joaquin Wilde and Raul Mendoza). At NXT Vengeance Day, Breakker defeated Escobar to retain the title; during the match, Ziggler interfered on Escobar's behalf, but later engaged in a brawl with Ciampa that spilled out of the ring. That same night, a match between Ziggler and Ciampa to determine the number one contender for the title was scheduled for the following week, which Ziggler won after interference from a cameraman, later revealed to be Ziggler's tag team partner, Robert Roode. Afterwards, Breakker attacked the two and, along with Ciampa, challenged Ziggler and Roode to a tag team match for the March 1 episode. On that episode, Ciampa and Breakker defeated Ziggler and Roode when Ciampa pinned Ziggler. As a result, Ciampa was added to the match, making it a triple threat match, and the match was scheduled for Roadblock. Prior to Roadblock, Breakker wrestled his first match on the main roster on the March 7 episode of Raw, where he teamed with Ciampa to take on Ziggler and Roode in a winning effort when Breakker pinned Ziggler.

At NXT Vengeance Day, The Creed Brothers (Brutus Creed and Julius Creed) defeated MSK (Wes Lee and Nash Carter) to win the 2022 Men's Dusty Rhodes Tag Team Classic and earn themselves a match for the NXT Tag Team Championship, which was held by Imperium (Fabian Aichner and Marcel Barthel). The match was later scheduled for Roadblock.

In late 2021, LA Knight began feuding with Grayson Waller. On the October 19 episode of NXT, Knight defeated Waller to earn the right to host Halloween Havoc. At the event, however, Waller took over hosting duties for most of the event, with Knight joining the fray afterwards. On the November 23 episode of NXT, a double turn took place: Waller turned heel by berating the fans, and Knight turned face by displaying fighting spirit attitude. Also on that same episode, Knight was attacked by Waller before Knight's match, resulting in a brawl that spilled backstage. At WarGames on December 5, Knight's team (Team Black & Gold) lost to Waller's team (Team 2.0) in a WarGames match. On the December 14 episode of NXT, Knight was attacked by Waller in the parking lot. Knight returned on the January 11, 2022, episode of NXT, where he attacked Waller after the latter's match. The following week, Waller presented a restraining order against Knight, who in turn scheduled Waller to face Dexter Lumis. Waller won after an "insurance policy" attacked Lumis. On the January 25 episode, the "insurance policy" was revealed to be Sanga. The following week, Knight lost his match after interference from Waller and Sanga. This led to a match between Knight and Sanga on the February 8 episode where Knight was victorious. Following the match, instead of lifting the restraining order, Waller threatened that Knight would be arrested for breaking it. At NXT Vengeance Day, Waller told the police to arrest Knight, stating that the restraining order was set up after Knight's attack on Waller after the latter's match on the January 11 episode, but Knight showed footage of Waller breaking the restraining order two weeks ago with an attack on Knight. Waller then stated that the restraining order was void. Knight then laid out Waller and Sanga, leading to a match between Waller and Knight being scheduled for the February 22 episode, where Waller won, but after the match, Knight attacked Waller and Sanga. On the March 1 episode, Knight challenged Waller to a Last Man Standing match, and Waller accepted. The match was subsequently scheduled for Roadblock.

During NXT: New Year's Evil, the 2022 Women's Dusty Rhodes Tag Team Classic was announced to begin in February. On March 8, it was revealed that both semifinal matches would take place at Roadblock.

== Event ==
=== Preliminary matches ===
The television special began with Raquel González and Cora Jade taking on Wendy Choo and Dakota Kai in the first of two Women's Dusty Rhodes Tag Team Classic semifinals. During the match, NXT Women's Tag Team Champions Toxic Attraction (Gigi Dolin and Jacy Jayne) attacked González while the referee was distracted, injuring her leg. The injury caught up to González at the end of the match when she attempted a Chingona Bomb on Kai, but failed because of the injury. Kai performed a Yakuza kick on González followed by a Vader Bomb by Choo and a top-rope double foot stomp by Kai to advance to the finals.

Afterwards, footage was shown of The Creed Brothers (Brutus Creed and Julius Creed) being laid out in the parking lot.

In the second match, Fallon Henley took on Tiffany Stratton. In the end, Stratton performed a Samoan Drop on Henley, but Sarray performed a dropkick on Stratton while the referee was distracted, and Henley performed a Shining Wizard on Stratton to win the match. Later that night, Stratton vowed to break Sarray's face and her medallion the following week.

Next, Grayson Waller took on LA Knight in a Last Man Standing match. During the match, Knight knocked Waller off of an elevated platform, but Waller was caught by Sanga, who no-sold a chair shot from Knight and chokeslammed Knight onto the ring apron. Knight then handcuffed Sanga to the ring post. Knight sent Waller out of the ring and through a table, but Waller stood at a nine count. In the end, Waller performed an elbow drop on Knight through the announce table. Waller used Sanga to make it to his feet, but Knight was unable to beat the ten count, thus Waller won.

In the fourth match, Io Shirai and Kay Lee Ray took on Kacy Catanzaro and Kayden Carter in the second of two Women's Dusty Rhodes Tag Team Classic semifinals. NXT Women's Champion Mandy Rose, along with Malik Blade and Edris Enofé, was seen watching the match from the "Toxic Lounge". After an evenly contested match between the two teams, Catanzaro blocked a double suplex from Shirai and Ray before Carter sent Shirai out of the ring. Carter then lifted Ray up and Catanzaro performed an inverted frankensteiner on Ray, but Shirai broke up the pin and sent Carter into the steel ring steps. Back in the ring, Shirai sent Catanzaro into a kick from Ray, and Ray performed a KLR bomb followed by a moonsault by Shirai to advance to the finals. Following the match, Cora Jade attacked Rose.

In the penultimate match, Imperium (Fabian Aichner and Marcel Barthel) were originally scheduled to defend the NXT Tag Team Championship against The Creed Brothers (Brutus Creed and Julius Creed), but due to the latter being attacked in the parking lot, they were replaced by MSK (Wes Lee and Nash Carter) during the Last Man Standing match. The match ended when The Creed Brothers attacked both teams, ending the match in a no-contest with Imperium retaining the titles.

Before the main event, A-Kid hyped his debut on NXT, with Ikemen Jiro and Kushida complementing his statements.

=== Main event ===
In the main event, Bron Breakker defended the NXT Championship against Dolph Ziggler (accompanied by Robert Roode) and Tommaso Ciampa. Ciampa performed a Project Ciampa on Ziggler for a nearfall. As Ciampa went for a Fairytale ending on Ziggler, Breakker performed a Spear on Ciampa. Breakker then performed a Spear and a Military Press Powerslam on Ziggler, but Roode pulled the referee out of the ring. Ciampa performed Willow's bell and a Fairytale ending on Breakker, but Ziggler tossed Ciampa aside and pinned Breakker himself for a nearfall. In the end, Ciampa charged at Breakker, but Roode pulled Breakker out of the ring and Ziggler performed a superkick on Breakker to win the title for the first time.

== Aftermath ==
On the following episode of NXT, NXT Champion Dolph Ziggler was a guest on The Miz's talk show, "Miz TV". After Ziggler thought that Breakker wouldn't challenge him after footage showed him leaving the Performance Center after he was unable to find Ziggler, LA Knight interfered. A match between Ziggler and Knight for the NXT Championship was made official for that episode's main event, where Ziggler retained. Afterwards, Breakker returned and challenged Ziggler to a match for the NXT Championship at NXT Stand & Deliver, and Ziggler accepted.

Also on NXT, Cora Jade knew that Raquel González was injured at the hands of Gigi Dolin and Jacy Jayne, and Jade thought that Toxic Attraction would come after Jade afterwards, so Jade stole all of the title belts from Toxic Attraction (Dolin, Jayne, and NXT Women's Champion Mandy Rose). Throughout that episode, Dolin and Jayne were trapped when they tried to retrieve the tag title belts. Later that night, as Jade was about to leave the Performance Center with the NXT Women's Championship belt, she was attacked by Rose, who spray-painted the back of Jade. A match between Jade and Rose for the NXT Women's Championship was subsequently made official for NXT Stand & Deliver. A week later, Io Shirai and Kay Lee Ray, who defeated Dakota Kai and Wendy Choo to win the 2022 Women's Dusty Rhodes Tag Team Classic, challenged Rose for the title, making it a fatal four-way match. On the March 29 episode, González returned to save Dakota Kai from a three-on-one beatdown from Toxic Attraction, setting up a match pitting Dolin and Jayne against González and Kai for the NXT Women's Tag Team Championship at Stand & Deliver.

The Creed Brothers (Julius Creed and Brutus Creed) demanded to know who attacked them backstage at Roadblock. MSK (Wes Lee and Nash Carter) then claimed that they did not attack them, but they deserved a match for the NXT Tag Team Championship. Defending champions Imperium (Fabian Aichner and Marcel Barthel) interrupted and attacked both teams, and stated that they will defend the tag titles against both teams as they did not fear anyone. Later that night, a triple threat tag team match between the three teams for the NXT Tag Team Championship was scheduled for Stand & Deliver.

A-Kid and Kushida would have their match on the following NXT, where A-Kid was victorious. This match was also to determine who would be in the following week's qualifying match for the NXT North American Championship ladder match at Stand & Deliver.

Also on NXT, Tiffany Stratton attacked Sarray while the latter was making her entrance, allowing Stratton to easily defeat Sarray in less than a minute. Two weeks later, Sarray distracted Stratton during the latter's match, causing her to lose. On the April 19 episode, Stratton defeated Sarray again.

After their loss to Io Shirai and Kay Lee Ray, Kacy Catanzaro and Kayden Carter would eventually return their focus to the NXT Women's Tag Team Championship. After defeating Valentina Feroz and Yulisa Leon on the April 26 episode of NXT, they were scheduled to take on defending champions Toxic Attraction (Gigi Dolin and Jacy Jayne) for the titles at In Your House.

A second NXT Roadblock was confirmed for March 7, 2023, thus establishing Roadblock as an annual March event for NXT.

== Results ==
| No. | Results | Stipulations | Times |
|---|---|---|---|
| 1 | Dakota Kai and Wendy Choo defeated Cora Jade and Raquel González by pinfall | Semifinals tag team match in the Women's Dusty Rhodes Tag Team Classic | 10:42 |
| 2 | Fallon Henley defeated Tiffany Stratton by pinfall | Singles match | 2:48 |
| 3 | Grayson Waller defeated LA Knight | Last Man Standing match | 16:01 |
| 4 | Io Shirai and Kay Lee Ray defeated Kacy Catanzaro and Kayden Carter by pinfall | Semifinals tag team match in the Women's Dusty Rhodes Tag Team Classic | 7:59 |
| 5 | Imperium (Fabian Aichner and Marcel Barthel) (c) vs. MSK (Wes Lee and Nash Carter) ended in a no-contest | Tag team match for the NXT Tag Team Championship | 5:33 |
| 6 | Dolph Ziggler (with Robert Roode) defeated Bron Breakker (c) and Tommaso Ciampa by pinfall | Triple threat match for the NXT Championship | 12:24 |
(c) / – the champion(s) heading into the match
