= WWE Live from Madison Square Garden =

2015 WWE Network event

Live from Madison Square Garden
- Official logo
- Promotion: WWE
- Date: October 3, 2015
- City: New York City, New York
- Venue: Madison Square Garden
- Attendance: 20,224

WWE event chronology
← Previous; Night of Champions	Next → NXT TakeOver: Respect

WWE Network specials chronology
← Previous; The Beast in the East	Next → Roadblock

Live from Madison Square Garden, also called Live from MSG: Lesnar vs. Big Show, was a 2015 professional wrestling livestreaming event produced by WWE. The event took place on October 3, 2015, at Madison Square Garden (MSG) in New York City, New York and was the second of seven originally scheduled house shows to broadcast as a WWE Network special. It was promoted as part of Brock Lesnar's "Go To Hell Tour" as well as his return to MSG in his first match in the arena since his original departure from the company after WrestleMania XX in 2004. The event also marked the 25th anniversary of Chris Jericho's debut in professional wrestling.

Nine matches were contested at the event, as well as two dark matches. In the main event, John Cena defeated Seth Rollins in a steel cage match to retain the WWE United States Championship. In another prominent match for which the event was promoted around, Brock Lesnar defeated Big Show. Also on the undercard, Kevin Owens defeated Chris Jericho to retain the WWE Intercontinental Championship and The Dudley Boyz (Bubba Ray Dudley and D-Von Dudley) defeated WWE Tag Team Champions The New Day (Big E and Kofi Kingston) by disqualification, thus The New Day kept their title as titles do not change hands by disqualification unless stipulated.

== Production ==
=== Background ===
Live from Madison Square Garden was originally scheduled as a house show, a non-televised professional wrestling event, produced by WWE. The event was named as it was scheduled to be held at Madison Square Garden (MSG) in New York City, New York on October 3, 2015. As part of a feud between Brock Lesnar and The Undertaker going into the Hell in a Cell pay-per-view and livestreaming event later that same month, WWE decided to livestream the event exclusively as a WWE Network special and promoted the event as part of Lesnar's "Go To Hell Tour". This was also Lesnar's return to MSG in his first match in the arena since his original departure from the company after WrestleMania XX in 2004. As such, the event was also called Live from MSG: Lesnar vs. Big Show, as Lesnar was scheduled to face Big Show at the event.

The event also marked the 25th anniversary of Chris Jericho's debut in professional wrestling. This was also the second originally scheduled house show to broadcast as a WWE Network special, after The Beast in the East earlier in July.

=== Storylines ===
The card consisted of nine matches, including two dark matches, that resulted from scripted storylines. Results were predetermined by WWE's writers, with storylines played out on WWE's primary television programs, Raw and SmackDown.

The event featured Brock Lesnar in a match with Big Show, which was Lesnar's first match at Madison Square Garden since WrestleMania XX in March 2004. Lesnar and Show previously had a feud in January 2014 after Show confronted Lesnar on the January 6 episode of Raw. There was a short physical confrontation between the two, starting a feud which was settled at the Royal Rumble 2014, where Show lost to Lesnar after being brutally assaulted with numerous steel chairs before the match began.

On the July 27 episode of Raw, United States Champion John Cena challenged WWE World Heavyweight Champion Seth Rollins but The Authority (Triple H and Stephanie McMahon) instead scheduled a match between the two for Cena's United States Championship. Cena won the match by submission, during which Rollins legit broke Cena's nose. Rollins then challenged Cena to a Winner Takes All match at SummerSlam, which Cena accepted. Rollins won the match when guest host Jon Stewart interfered on Rollins's behalf. At Night of Champions, Cena defeated Rollins to regain the United States Championship. The following night on Raw, Cena defeated Rollins in a rematch for the title.

Dolph Ziggler and Rusev had an ongoing feud, stemming from Ziggler forming a romantic relationship with Lana, Rusev's former valet. The two fought to a double countout at SummerSlam. In a rematch on the August 31 episode of Raw, Ziggler won by disqualification following the interference of Rusev's new girlfriend, Summer Rae. Ziggler defeated Rusev at Night of Champions to end their feud.

== Event ==
Other on-screen personnel
Role	Name
Commentators	Rich Brennan
Commentators	John "Bradshaw" Layfield
Commentators	Byron Saxton
Ring announcer	Eden Stiles

=== Preliminary matches ===
The event opened with Randy Orton and Dolph Ziggler facing Sheamus and Rusev. In the end, Ziggler executed a Superkick on Sheamus, which was followed by Orton executing an RKO to win the match.

Next, Neville faced Stardust. Neville executed a Red Arrow on Stardust to win the match.

After that, Team Bella (Nikki Bella, Brie Bella, and Alicia Fox) faced Team PCB (Paige, WWE Divas Champion Charlotte, and Becky Lynch). Nikki executed a Rack Attack on Paige to win the match for Team Bella.

In the fourth match, Kevin Owens defended the Intercontinental Championship against Chris Jericho. The ending saw Jericho attempt to apply the Walls of Jericho but Owens poked Jericho's eye and pinned Jericho with a roll-up to retain the title.

In the fifth match, The New Day (Big E and Kofi Kingston) defended the WWE Tag Team Championship against The Dudley Boyz (Bubba Ray Dudley and D-Von Dudley). In the end, The Dudley Boyz performed a 3D on Kingston but Xavier Woods interfered. Accordingly, the Dudley Boyz won by disqualification but The New Day retained the title. After the match, The Dudley Boyz put Woods through a table with a 3D.

In the penultimate match, Brock Lesnar (accompanied by Paul Heyman) faced Big Show. During the match, Big Show executed three Chokeslams on Lesnar for a near-fall. The match ended when Lesnar executed four German Suplexes and an F5 on Big Show to win the match.

=== Main event ===
In the main event, John Cena defended the United States Championship against WWE World Heavyweight Champion Seth Rollins in a Steel Cage match. In the climax, As Cena attempted an Attitude Adjustment, Rollins countered a low blow. Rollins attempted to climb out of the cage, however, Kane appeared and forced Rollins to climb back in. As Rollins then attempted a Frog Splash off the top of the cage on Cena, Cena moved out of the way and executed an Attitude Adjustment on Rollins to retain the title. After the match, Kane performed a Chokeslam and a Tombstone Piledriver on Rollins.

== Results ==
No.	Results	Stipulations	Times
1^{D}	Zack Ryder defeated Bo Dallas	Singles match	—
2^{D}	Mark Henry defeated Brad Maddox	Singles match	0:25
3	Randy Orton and Dolph Ziggler defeated Sheamus and Rusev (with Summer Rae)	Tag team match	9:00
4	Neville defeated Stardust	Singles match	7:20
5	Team Bella (Nikki Bella, Brie Bella, and Alicia Fox) defeated Team PCB (Paige, Charlotte, and Becky Lynch)	Six-woman tag team match	8:35
6	Kevin Owens (c) defeated Chris Jericho	Singles match for the WWE Intercontinental Championship	8:10
7	The Dudley Boyz (Bubba Ray and D-Von) defeated The New Day (Big E and Kofi Kingston) (with Xavier Woods) (c) by disqualification	Tag team match for the WWE Tag Team Championship	6:40
8	Brock Lesnar (with Paul Heyman) defeated Big Show	Singles match	4:05
9	John Cena (c) defeated Seth Rollins	Steel Cage match for the WWE United States Championship	22:43
(c) / – the champion(s) heading into the match; D / – this was a dark match
