= List of WWE NXT special episodes =

This is a list of WWE NXT special episodes, detailing all professional wrestling television special cards promoted on NXT by WWE.

== 2010s ==
=== 2010 ===
Date	Episode title	Venue	Location	Final match	Rating (18–49)	U.S. Viewers (million)	Notes
February 23	NXT Season 1 Premiere	Bradley Center	Milwaukee, Wisconsin	Chris Jericho vs. Daniel Bryan	1.3	1.7	Debut NXT episode on Syfy, replacing ECW. First NXT episode under the reality competition-based format.
June 1	NXT Season 1 Finale	American Airlines Center	Dallas, Texas	David Otunga vs. Justin Gabriel vs. Wade Barrett in a triple threat elimination match	1.17	1.4	Wade Barrett was declared the winner.
June 8	NXT Season 2 Premiere	St. Pete Times Forum	Tampa, Florida	Cody Rhodes and Husky Harris vs. Montel Vontavious Porter and Percy Watson	1.07	1.5	
August 31	NXT Season 2 Finale	Times Union Center	Albany, New York	Alex Riley vs. Kaval vs. Michael McGillicutty in a triple threat match	1.02	1.3	Kaval was declared the winner.
September 7	NXT Season 3 Premiere	1st Mariner Arena	Baltimore, Maryland	AJ & Primo vs. Aksana and Goldust	0.96	1.2	Featured an all Divas season. The show was moved from Syfy to WWE.com mid-season.
November 30	NXT Season 3 Finale	Norfolk Scope	Norfolk, Virginia	Kaitlyn vs. Naomi	—N/a	—N/a	Kaitlyn was declared the winner.
December 7	NXT Season 4 Premiere	Nutter Center	Dayton, Ohio	Alberto Del Rio and Conor O'Brian vs. Daniel Bryan and Derrick Bateman	—N/a	—N/a	First season to be broadcast entirely on WWE.com.

=== 2011 ===
Date	Episode title	Venue	Location	Final match	Rating (18–49)	U.S. Viewers (million)	Notes
March 1	NXT Season 4 Finale	Quicken Loans Arena	Cleveland, Ohio	Byron Saxton and Jacob Novak vs. Conor O'Brian and Derrick Bateman	—N/a	—N/a	Johnny Curtis was declared the winner.
March 8	NXT Redemption Premiere	Toyota Center	Houston, Texas	Lucky Cannon vs. Titus O'Neil	—N/a	—N/a	Featured seven rookies chosen from the previous male-only seasons.

=== 2012 ===
Date	Episode title	Venue	Location	Final match	Rating (18–49)	U.S. Viewers (million)	Notes
June 13	NXT Redemption Finale	Verizon Wireless Arena	Manchester, New Hampshire	The Usos (Jey Uso and Jimmy Uso) vs. Johnny Curtis and Michael McGillicutty	—N/a	—N/a	Final episode of NXT under the reality competition-based format. No winner was declared.
June 20	NXT Season 6 Premiere	Full Sail University	Winter Park, Florida	Michael McGillicutty vs. Tyson Kidd	—N/a	—N/a	First NXT episode as a developmental brand and first event at Full Sail University.

=== 2013 ===
Date	Episode title	Venue	Location	Final match	Rating (18–49)	U.S. Viewers (million)	Notes
April 24	Clash of the Champions	Full Sail University	Winter Park, Florida	Wade Barrett (c) vs. Bo Dallas for the WWE Intercontinental Championship	—N/a	—N/a	
December 25	Rewind 2013	Full Sail University	Winter Park, Florida	—N/a	—N/a	—N/a	End of the year recap episode

=== 2014 ===
Date	Episode title	Venue	Location	Final match	Rating (18–49)	U.S. Viewers (million)	Notes
March 27	Vengeance Week	Full Sail University	Winter Park, Florida	Adrian Neville (c) vs. Bo Dallas for the NXT Championship	—N/a	—N/a	
December 25	Rewind 2014	Full Sail University	Winter Park, Florida	—N/a	—N/a	—N/a	End of the year recap episode

=== 2015 ===
Date	Episode title	Venue	Location	Final match	Rating (18–49)	U.S. Viewers (million)	Notes
March 18	Arnold Sports Festival	Lifestyle Communities Pavilion	Columbus, Ohio	Kevin Owens vs. Alex Riley	—N/a	—N/a	Held at the Arnold Sports Festival.
December 30	The Best of NXT 2015	Full Sail University	Winter Park, Florida	—N/a	—N/a	—N/a	End of the year recap episode
December 30	WrestleMania 31 Axxess	McEnery Convention Center	San Jose, California	Finn Bálor vs. Hideo Itami in the final of the Andre the Giant Memorial Battle Royal qualifying tournament	—N/a	—N/a	

=== 2016 ===
Date	Episode title	Venue	Location	Final match	Rating (18–49)	U.S. Viewers (million)	Notes
December 28	NXT in Japan	Osaka, Japan	Osaka Prefectural Gymnasium	Samoa Joe (c) vs. Shinsuke Nakamura for the NXT Championship	—N/a	—N/a	First 2-hour edition of NXT

=== 2017 ===
Date	Episode title	Venue	Location	Final match	Rating (18–49)	U.S. Viewers (million)	Notes
January 4	NXT in Australia	Margaret Court Arena	Melbourne, Victoria, Australia	Shinsuke Nakamura (c) vs. Samoa Joe in a Steel Cage match for the NXT Championship	—N/a	—N/a	
December 13	NXT Holiday Week	Full Sail University	Winter Park, Florida	Adam Cole vs. Aleister Black for a spot in the Fatal 4-way match to determine the #1 contender for the NXT Championship	0.27	0.84	Simulcasted on the WWE Network and USA as part of USA's WWE Holiday Week.

=== 2019 ===
Date	Episode title	Venue	Location	Final match	Rating (18–49)	U.S. Viewers (million)	Notes
September 18	NXT's USA Network premiere	Full Sail University	Winter Park, Florida	Killian Dain vs. Matt Riddle in a Street Fight	0.43	1.18	The first hour aired on USA, while the second hour aired on the WWE Network.
October 2	First two-hour NXT on USA	Full Sail University	Winter Park, Florida	The Undisputed Era (Bobby Fish and Kyle O'Reilly) (c) vs. The Street Profits (Angelo Dawkins and Montez Ford) for the NXT Tag Team Championship	0.32	0.89	The start of the Wednesday Night Wars.

== 2020s ==
=== 2020 ===
Date	Episode	Venue	Location	Final match	Rating (18–49)	U.S. Viewers (million)	Notes
January 1	2019 NXT Year-End Awards	Full Sail University	Winter Park, Florida	Adam Cole vs. Johnny Gargano in a 2-out-of-3 falls match for the vacant NXT Championship	0.15	0.55	
July 1	The Great American Bash	Full Sail University	Winter Park, Florida	Sasha Banks vs. Io Shirai	0.22	0.79	Went head-to-head with AEW Fyter Fest.
July 8	The Great American Bash	Full Sail University	Winter Park, Florida	Adam Cole (NXT) vs. Keith Lee (North American) in a Winner Takes All match for the NXT Championship and the NXT North American Championship	0.20	0.76	Went head-to-head with AEW Fyter Fest.
September 1	Super Tuesday	Full Sail University	Winter Park, Florida	Adam Cole vs. Finn Bálor vs. Johnny Gargano vs. Tommaso Ciampa in a Fatal 4-way Iron Man match for the NXT Championship	0.26	0.85	A two-week tv special held on Tuesdays due to USA's Wednesday coverage of the Stanley Cup playoffs.
September 8	Super Tuesday	Full Sail University	Winter Park, Florida	Rhea Ripley vs. Mercedes Martinez in a steel cage match	0.22	0.84	A two-week tv special held on Tuesdays due to USA's Wednesday coverage of the Stanley Cup playoffs.
September 23	Takeoff to TakeOver	WWE Performance Center	Orlando, Florida	Bronson Reed vs. Kushida vs. Timothy Thatcher vs. Cameron Grimes vs. Kyle O'Reilly in a Gauntlet Eliminator to determine the #1 contender for the NXT Championship	0.18	0.7	TakeOver 31 preview show
October 28	Halloween Havoc	WWE Performance Center	Orlando, Florida	Io Shirai (c) vs. Candice LeRae in a Tables, Ladders and Scares match for the NXT Women's Championship	0.25	0.88	Hosted by Shotzi Blackheart. First Halloween Havoc event held since 2000 and first under the WWE and NXT banner. Featured Spin The Wheel, Make the Deal.
December 23	A Very Gargano Christmas	WWE Performance Center	Orlando, Florida	Adam Cole vs Velveteen Dream	0.19	0.7	Went head-to-head with AEW Holiday Bash.
December 30	2020 NXT Year-End Awards	WWE Performance Center	Orlando, Florida	Johnny Gargano (c) vs. Leon Ruff for the NXT North American Championship	0.12	0.59	Went head-to-head with AEW's Celebration of Mr. Brodie Lee's Life.

=== 2021 ===
Date	Episode title	Venue	Location	Final match	Rating (18–49)	U.S. Viewers (million)	Notes
January 6	New Year's Evil	WWE Performance Center	Orlando, Florida	Finn Bálor (c) vs. Kyle O'Reilly for the NXT Championship	0.16	0.64	Hosted by Dexter Lumis. First New Year's Evil special since 1999 and first under the WWE and NXT banner. Went head-to-head with night 1 of AEW New Year's Smash.
April 7	TakeOver: Stand & Deliver (Night 1)	WWE Performance Center	Orlando, Florida	Io Shirai (c) vs. Raquel González for the NXT Women's Championship	0.24	0.768	Was the first TakeOver event to air on USA. Concluded the Wednesday Night Wars, as NXT moved to Tuesdays on April 13.
April 13	NXT's move to Tuesday	WWE Performance Center	Orlando, Florida	The Way (Johnny Gargano, Austin Theory, Candice LeRae, Indi Hartwell) vs. Dexter Lumis, Bronson Reed, Ember Moon, and Shotzi Blackheart	0.22	0.805	First NXT episode after the end of the Wednesday Night Wars.
July 6	The Great American Bash	WWE Performance Center	Orlando, Florida	Adam Cole vs. Kyle O'Reilly	0.19	0.707	
July 27	NXT on Syfy	WWE Performance Center	Orlando, Florida	Adam Cole vs. Bronson Reed	0.12	0.52	Aired on Syfy due to USA's coverage of the Summer Olympics. First NXT episode on Syfy since September 28, 2010.
August 3	NXT on Syfy	WWE Performance Center	Orlando, Florida	Johnny Gargano vs. Dexter Lumis in a Love Her or Lose Her match	0.10	0.52	Aired on Syfy due to USA's coverage of the Summer Olympics. First NXT episode on Syfy since September 28, 2010.
September 14	NXT 2.0 premiere	WWE Performance Center	Orlando, Florida	Tommaso Ciampa vs. Pete Dunne vs. LA Knight vs. Von Wagner in a fatal four-way match for the vacant NXT Championship	0.21	0.77	First episode of the newly revamped NXT, featuring a new logo, a remodeled WWE Performance Center, and new theme song performed by Wale.
October 26	Halloween Havoc	WWE Performance Center	Orlando, Florida	Tommaso Ciampa (c) vs. Bron Breakker for the NXT Championship	0.18	0.746	

=== 2022 ===
Date	Episode title	Venue	Location	Final match	Rating (18–49)	U.S. Viewers (million)	Notes
January 4	New Year's Evil	WWE Performance Center	Orlando, Florida	Tommaso Ciampa (c) vs. Bron Breakker for the NXT Championship	0.16	0.685	
February 15	Vengeance Day	WWE Performance Center	Orlando, Florida	Bron Breakker (c) vs. Santos Escobar for the NXT Championship	0.11	0.525	Aired on Syfy.
March 8	Roadblock	WWE Performance Center	Orlando, Florida	Bron Breakker (c) vs. Dolph Ziggler vs. Tommaso Ciampa in a triple threat match for the NXT Championship	0.13	0.613	
May 3	Spring Breakin'	WWE Performance Center	Orlando, Florida	Bron Breakker (c) vs. Joe Gacy for the NXT Championship	0.13	0.661	
July 5	The Great American Bash	WWE Performance Center	Orlando, Florida	Bron Breakker (c) vs. Cameron Grimes for the NXT Championship	0.12	0.593	
August 16	Heatwave	WWE Performance Center	Orlando, Florida	Bron Breakker (c) vs. JD McDonagh for the NXT Championship	0.14	0.678	First Heat Wave event held since 2000 and first under the WWE and NXT banner.
September 13	NXT 2.0: 1-Year Anniversary	WWE Performance Center	Orlando, Florida	Carmelo Hayes (c) vs. Solo Sikoa for the NXT North American Championship	0.15	0.728	Revived the fan voting for matches concept from Taboo Tuesday used from 2004 to 2008. At the end of the show, Shawn Michaels revealed the new NXT logo which effectively ended the "2.0" branding.

=== 2023 ===
Date	Episode title	Venue	Location	Final match	Rating (18–49)	U.S. Viewers (million)	Notes
January 10	New Year's Evil	WWE Performance Center	Orlando, Florida	20-woman battle royal for an NXT Women's Championship match at Vengeance Day	0.15	0.700	
March 7	Roadblock	WWE Performance Center	Orlando, Florida	Roxanne Perez (c) vs. Meiko Satomura for the NXT Women's Championship	0.17	0.624	
April 25	Spring Breakin'	WWE Performance Center	Orlando, Florida	Indi Hartwell (c) vs. Roxanne Perez vs. Tiffany Stratton in a triple threat match for the NXT Women's Championship	0.18	0.647	
June 20	Gold Rush	WWE Performance Center	Orlando, Florida	Seth "Freakin" Rollins (c) vs. Bron Breakker for the World Heavyweight Championship	0.23	0.773	
June 27	Gold Rush	WWE Performance Center	Orlando, Florida	Carmelo Hayes (c) vs. Baron Corbin for the NXT Championship	0.17	0.622	
August 22	Heatwave	WWE Performance Center	Orlando, Florida	Carmelo Hayes (c) vs. Wes Lee for the NXT Championship	0.19	0.720	
October 10	First 30 Minutes Commercial-Free	WWE Performance Center	Orlando, Florida	Carmelo Hayes vs. Bron Breakker	0.30	0.921	Cody Rhodes was the special guest general manager.; Featured special appearances by John Cena, Paul Heyman, and The Undertaker.; Went head-to-head with AEW Dynamite, which aired on a Tuesday due to TBS's coverage of the MLB playoffs.
October 24	Halloween Havoc	WWE Performance Center	Orlando, Florida	Becky Lynch (c) vs. Lyra Valkyria for the NXT Women's Championship	0.21	0.787	
October 31	Halloween Havoc	WWE Performance Center	Orlando, Florida	Ilja Dragunov (c) vs. Carmelo Hayes for the NXT Championship	0.20	0.674	

=== 2024 ===
Date	Episode title	Venue	Location	Final match	Rating (18–49)	U.S. Viewers (million)	Notes
January 2	New Year's Evil	WWE Performance Center	Orlando, Florida	Trick Williams vs. Grayson Waller for Williams's NXT Championship opportunity	0.25	0.768	
March 5	Roadblock	WWE Performance Center	Orlando, Florida	Carmelo Hayes vs. Tony D'Angelo for an NXT Championship match at Stand & Deliver	0.16	0.654	
April 23	Spring Breakin'	WWE Performance Center	Orlando, Florida	Ilja Dragunov (c) vs. Trick Williams for the NXT Championship	0.20	0.661	
April 30	Spring Breakin'	WWE Performance Center	Orlando, Florida	Lola Vice vs. Natalya in an NXT Underground match	0.14	0.564	
July 30	The Great American Bash	WWE Performance Center	Orlando, Florida	Roxanne Perez (c) vs. Thea Hail for the NXT Women's Championship	0.15	0.468	Aired on Syfy due to USA’s coverage of the Summer Olympics.
August 6	The Great American Bash	WWE Performance Center	Orlando, Florida	Axiom and Nathan Frazer (c) vs. MSK (Wes Lee and Zachary Wentz) for the NXT Tag Team Championship	0.16	0.534	Aired on Syfy due to USA’s coverage of the Summer Olympics.
September 10	WWE Week on USA	WWE Performance Center	Orlando, Florida	Pete Dunne vs. Trick Williams in a Last Man Standing match to determine the #1 contender to the NXT Championship	0.19	0.628	NXT, Raw, and SmackDown aired on USA that week.
October 1	NXT's CW Premiere	Allstate Arena	Rosemont, Illinois	Ethan Page (c) vs. Trick Williams for the NXT Championship, with CM Punk as special guest referee	0.26	0.895	
October 8	NXT's CW Premiere	The Factory At The District	Chesterfield, Missouri	Axiom and Nathan Frazer (c) vs. A-Town Down Under (Austin Theory and Grayson Waller) for the NXT Tag Team Championship	0.24	0.874	Went head-to-head with AEW Dynamite: Title Tuesday, which aired on a Tuesday due to TBS's coverage of the MLB playoffs.; Sexyy Red was a special guest.
November 6	NXT 2300	2300 Arena	Philadelphia, Pennsylvania	Fatal Influence (Fallon Henley, Jacy Jayne, and Jazmyn Nyx), Cora Jade, and Roxanne Perez vs. Giulia, Jordynne Grace, Kelani Jordan, Stephanie Vaquer, and Zaria	0.17	0.619	Took place on a Wednesday due to the U.S. presidential election, thus going head-to-head with AEW Dynamite.

=== 2025 ===
Date	Episode title	Venue	Location	Final match	Rating (18–49)	U.S. Viewers (million)	Notes
January 7	New Year's Evil	Shrine Expo Hall	Los Angeles, California	Trick Williams (c) vs Oba Femi vs Eddy Thorpe in a triple threat match for the NXT Championship	0.21	0.798	
March 11	Roadblock	The Theater at Madison Square Garden	New York City, New York	Giulia (NXT) vs. Stephanie Vaquer (North American) in a Winner Takes All match for the NXT Women's Championship and NXT Women's North American Championship	0.15	0.676	
September 16	Homecoming	Full Sail University	Winter Park, Florida	Fatal Influence (Jacy Jayne, Fallon Henley, and Jazmyn Nyx) vs. Rhea Ripley, Stephanie Vaquer, and Lyra Valkyria	0.17	0.737	First NXT episode held at Full Sail University since September 2020.; Featured the NXT returns of Shayna Baszler, Finn Bálor, Robert Roode, Montez Ford, and Bianca Belair.
October 7	Showdown	WWE Performance Center	Orlando, Florida	Team NXT (Ricky Saints, Trick Williams, Je'Von Evans, and Myles Borne) vs. Team TNA (Mike Santana, Frankie Kazarian, Moose, and Leon Slater) in a 4-on-4 men's Survivor Series-style elimination match with Joe Hendry as the special guest referee	0.12	0.625	Co-produced with TNA.
November 18	Gold Rush	The Theater at Madison Square Garden	New York City, New York	Tatum Paxley (c) vs. Jacy Jayne in a Last Chance match for the NXT Women's Championship	—N/a	—N/a	Co-produced with TNA and AAA.
November 25	Gold Rush	The Theater at Madison Square Garden	New York City, New York	Trick Williams vs. Myles Borne in a Men's Iron Survivor Challenge qualifier	—N/a	—N/a	Co-produced with TNA and AAA.

=== 2026 ===
Date	Episode	Venue	Location	Final match	Rating (18–49)	U.S. Viewers (million)	Notes
January 6	New Year's Evil	WWE Performance Center	Orlando, Florida	Oba Femi (c) vs. Leon Slater for the NXT Championship	—N/a	—N/a	
April 14	Revenge	WWE Performance Center	Orlando, Florida	Lola Vice (c) vs. Jacy Jayne for the NXT Women's Championship	—N/a	—N/a	
April 21	Revenge	WWE Performance Center	Orlando, Florida	Sol Ruca vs. Zaria in a Last Woman Standing match	—N/a	—N/a	

== See also ==
- List of WWE Raw special episodes
- List of WWE SmackDown special episodes
- List of WWE pay-per-view and WWE Network events
- Wednesday Night Wars
