= Roadblock: End of the Line =

2016 WWE pay-per-view and livestreaming event

- Promotional poster featuring Roman Reigns and Kevin Owens
- Promotion: WWE
- Brand: Raw
- Date: December 18, 2016
- City: Pittsburgh, Pennsylvania
- Venue: PPG Paints Arena
- Tagline: End of the Line

WWE event chronology
← Previous; TLC: Tables, Ladders & Chairs	Next → United Kingdom Championship Tournament

Roadblock chronology
← Previous; March 2016	Next → 2022

Roadblock: End of the Line was a 2016 professional wrestling pay-per-view (PPV) and livestreaming event produced by WWE, held exclusively for wrestlers from the promotion's main roster brand, Raw. It was the second Roadblock and took place on December 18, 2016, at the PPG Paints Arena in Pittsburgh, Pennsylvania. The event's name was a reference to this being WWE's final PPV and livestreaming event of 2016.

Seven matches were contested at the event, including one on the Kickoff pre-show. In the main event, Kevin Owens retained the WWE Universal Championship against Roman Reigns by disqualification when Chris Jericho attacked Owens, thus Owens retained as titles do not change hands by disqualification unless stipulated. In the opening bout, the team of Cesaro and Sheamus defeated The New Day (Big E and Kofi Kingston) to win the Raw Tag Team Championship, ending New Day's record-setting reign of 483 days; this remained the longest tag team championship reign on WWE's main roster until November 2022. In other prominent matches, Rich Swann retained the WWE Cruiserweight Championship against The Brian Kendrick and T. J. Perkins in a triple threat match, Seth Rollins defeated Chris Jericho, and Charlotte Flair defeated Sasha Banks in overtime of a 30-minute Iron Man match to win her record fourth Raw Women's Championship.

This was the second Roadblock to be held in 2016, after the first Roadblock was held in March as part of the "Road to WrestleMania", which made it the first to be held after the reintroduction of the brand split in July. While that first event was streamed exclusively as a WWE Network special in the United States and on PPV internationally, this second event aired on PPV and the WWE Network worldwide. This was the final Roadblock until 2022 when WWE revived the event as a television special for the NXT brand.

== Production ==
=== Background ===
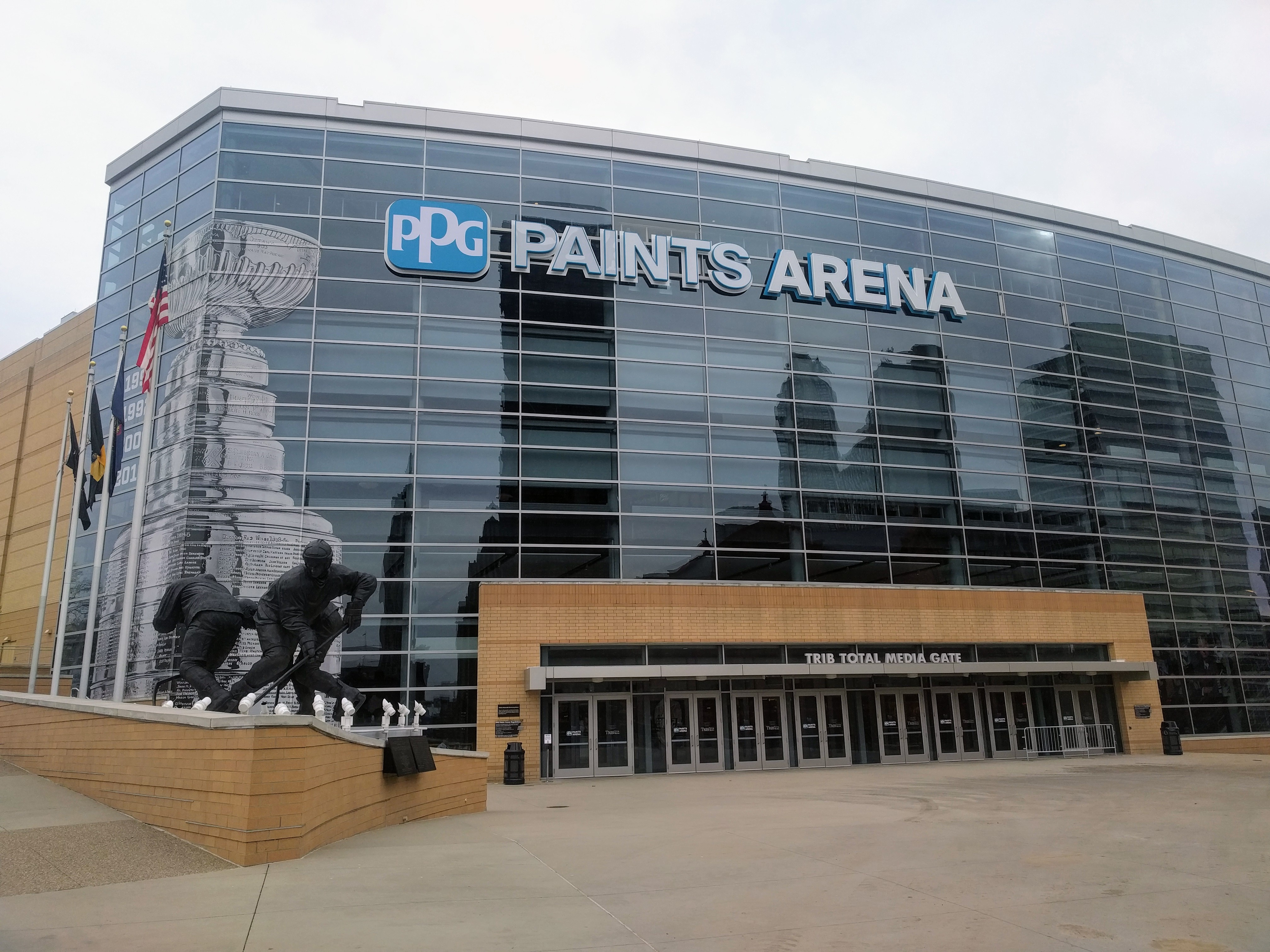
The second Roadblock was held at the PPG Paints Arena in Pittsburgh, Pennsylvania.

In March 2016, the professional wrestling promotion WWE held an event titled Roadblock, which was originally a non-televised house show that was turned into a WWE Network special in the United States to further build towards WrestleMania 32; outside of the U.S., it aired via traditional pay-per-view (PPV). The name was a reference to its position on the "Road to WrestleMania". Following the reintroduction of the brand extension in July, where the promotion again split its main roster into two separate brands, Raw and SmackDown, where wrestlers were exclusively assigned to perform, the promotion reinstated brand-exclusive PPV and livestreaming events. On July 25, 2016, the Roadblock name was in turn reused for the Raw-exclusive December event, which was held on December 18, 2016, at the PPG Paints Arena in Pittsburgh, Pennsylvania, and in addition to being available to livestream on the WWE Network, it was available via traditional PPV outlets worldwide. This second Roadblock event was titled Roadblock: End of the Line due to it being WWE's final PPV and livestreaming event of the year. Tickets went on sale on October 7 through Ticketmaster.

=== Storylines ===
The event comprised seven matches, including one on the Kickoff pre-show, that resulted from scripted storylines. Results were predetermined by WWE's writers on the Raw brand, while storylines were produced on WWE's weekly television shows, Monday Night Raw and the cruiserweight-exclusive 205 Live.

After being part of Team Raw's losing effort against Team SmackDown at Survivor Series, Chris Jericho and Kevin Owens got into a heated argument during Jericho's "Highlight Reel" on Raw. Jericho blamed Owens for using "The List of Jericho" as a weapon, whereas Owens explained that he tried to save Jericho from being eliminated. The two finally agreed that Roman Reigns and Seth Rollins were at fault for the loss. The same night, as a reward for having joined Team Raw, Rollins received another opportunity at Owens's WWE Universal Championship in a no disqualification match. Both Jericho, who had repeatedly interfered in Owens's title defenses and cost Rollins the Universal title, and Reigns were banned from ringside. Jericho, disguised as a masked fan, interfered nonetheless, allowing Owens to capitalize and retain the championship.

The following week, the friendship between Kevin Owens and Chris Jericho was disrupted, when Owens stated he did not need Jericho's help against the challenge of Roman Reigns. A disgruntled Jericho left the arena, but on the way out, he was attacked by Seth Rollins and suffered a Pedigree on top of a car, while Reigns defeated Owens to earn a title match for the Universal Championship at Roadblock. On the December 5 episode, Rollins stated that he would go through Jericho and Owens to get to Triple H, who had originally enabled Owens to win the Universal Championship against Rollins in a fatal four-way elimination match back in August. Owens then revealed that he had lobbied management to get Jericho two matches: Jericho would be facing Rollins at Roadblock and he would challenge Reigns for the United States Championship on Raw. Though Jericho told Owens to stay out of the match, Owens came to ringside to aid Jericho, but caused a distraction, which allowed Reigns to retain the title. The following week, Owens made amends with Jericho and got them a match against The New Day (Xavier Woods and Big E, with Kofi Kingston) for the Raw Tag Team Championship. Later, General Manager Mick Foley added Rollins and Reigns to that match, making it a triple threat tag team match. During the match, the friendship again broke down between Owens and Jericho. At the close of the match, Rollins delivered a Pedigree to Jericho and The New Day capitalized on this to retain the championship. Afterwards, an argument ensued between Owens and Jericho. Jericho left and Reigns speared Owens.

At WrestleMania 32, Charlotte Flair became the inaugural WWE Women's Champion in a triple threat match involving Sasha Banks, who wasn't involved in the decision. Banks managed to win the title, which was renamed Raw Women's Championship in August, on the July 25 episode of Raw. Following this, Banks and Flair traded the championship four times, with the recent being in a Falls Count Anywhere match on the November 28 episode of Raw in Charlotte's hometown. After the match, Flair's father, Ric Flair, came out and congratulated Banks. The following week, Flair invoked her rematch clause; in response, Banks suggested a 30-minute Iron Man match at Roadblock, which Flair accepted. Later that night, Flair invited her father to the ring to publicly apologize for disowning him earlier in the year; the two hugged, but then Flair slapped him in the face, claiming that Ric turned his back on her. Banks came to Ric's aid, but was overpowered by Flair.

On the premiere episode of 205 Live on November 29, Rich Swann defeated The Brian Kendrick for the WWE Cruiserweight Championship. He retained the championship in a rematch the following week where T. J. Perkins was on commentary. After the match, Kendrick attacked Perkins, which resulted in a three-way brawl also involving Swann. On December 12, Swann was scheduled to defend the championship in a triple threat match against Kendrick and Perkins at Roadblock. On that night's Raw, Kendrick defeated Perkins in a singles match. The following night on 205 Live, Perkins defeated Swann by submission in a non-title match.

On the November 21 and November 28 episodes of Raw, Enzo Amore approached Rusev's wife, Lana. On the December 5 episode, Rusev and Lana got into an argument and Rusev stormed off. Amore tried to console Lana and later that night, was invited to her hotel room. Once he got there, Lana enticed Amore to strip down to his underwear and then called for Rusev, who attacked Amore before dragging his unconscious body into the hallway. The following week, Rusev and Lana mocked Amore by showing replays of the attack. Amore's tag team partner, Big Cass, got into a brawl with Rusev and sent him into retreat. A match between Cass and Rusev was then scheduled for the Roadblock Kickoff pre-show.

On the November 21 episode of Raw, General Manager Mick Foley put Sami Zayn in a match against Braun Strowman for failing to defeat The Miz at Survivor Series and bringing the Intercontinental Championship to Raw. Foley stopped the match when Zayn could not continue. The following week, Zayn demanded a rematch but Foley declined, telling Zayn that he could not beat Strowman. Zayn stormed off and on the December 12 episode, again asked for a rematch, but was again rejected. Zayn pondered switching to SmackDown because Foley did not believe in him. Following his match against Curtis Axel, Strowman declared that no one, including Zayn, could last two minutes with him. Later, after Zayn defeated Jinder Mahal, Foley told Zayn that he had arranged to trade Zayn to SmackDown in return for Eva Marie. An angry Zayn refused such a lopsided trade and again demanded for a rematch against Strowman. Foley yielded and scheduled Zayn to face Strowman at Roadblock in a match with a ten-minute time limit.

For several weeks, Tag Team Champions The New Day (Big E, Kofi Kingston, and Xavier Woods) had been hyping their Raw Tag Team Championship reign as they were soon overtaking Demolition's record of at 478 days as the longest reigning tag team champions in WWE history. On the November 21 and November 28 episodes of Raw, they retained their titles in back to back championship matches against Cesaro and Sheamus and then Luke Gallows and Karl Anderson, respectively. On the December 5 episode, a match pitting Cesaro and Sheamus against Gallows and Anderson to determine the number one contenders for the championship ended in a double countout as the two teams and New Day, who were doing commentary, brawled on the outside. A triple threat tag team championship match between the three teams was then scheduled for the following week. New Day won the match but in the ensuing celebration party, Woods accidentally sprayed champagne on Raw Commissioner Stephanie McMahon. As punishment, she forced New Day to defend the titles a second time; New Day defeated Kevin Owens and Chris Jericho as well as Seth Rollins and Roman Reigns in a triple threat match, making their breaking Demolition's record inevitable. At WWE Tribute to the Troops, Cesaro and Sheamus earned another title shot at Roadblock by winning a fatal four-way tag team match.

== Event ==
Other on-screen personnel
Role:	Name:
English commentators	Michael Cole
English commentators	Corey Graves
English commentators	Byron Saxton
English commentators	Austin Aries (Cruiserweight title match)
Spanish commentators	Carlos Cabrera
Spanish commentators	Marcelo Rodríguez
German commentators	Holger Böschen
German commentators	Manu Thiele
Ring announcer	JoJo
Referees	Chad Patton
Referees	Darrick Moore
Referees	John Cone
Referees	Rod Zapata
Backstage interviewers	Tom Phillips
Backstage interviewers	Charly Caruso
Pre-show panel	Renee Young
Pre-show panel	Sam Roberts
Pre-show panel	Booker T
Raw Talk panel	Charly Caruso
Raw Talk panel	Booker T

=== Pre-show ===
During the Roadblock: End of the Line Kickoff pre-show, Rusev (accompanied by Lana) faced Big Cass (accompanied by Enzo Amore). The match ended when Lana feigned an ankle injury and Rusev attacked Amore during the distraction. As a concerned Cass checked on Amore, he was counted out, giving the win to Rusev.

=== Preliminary matches ===
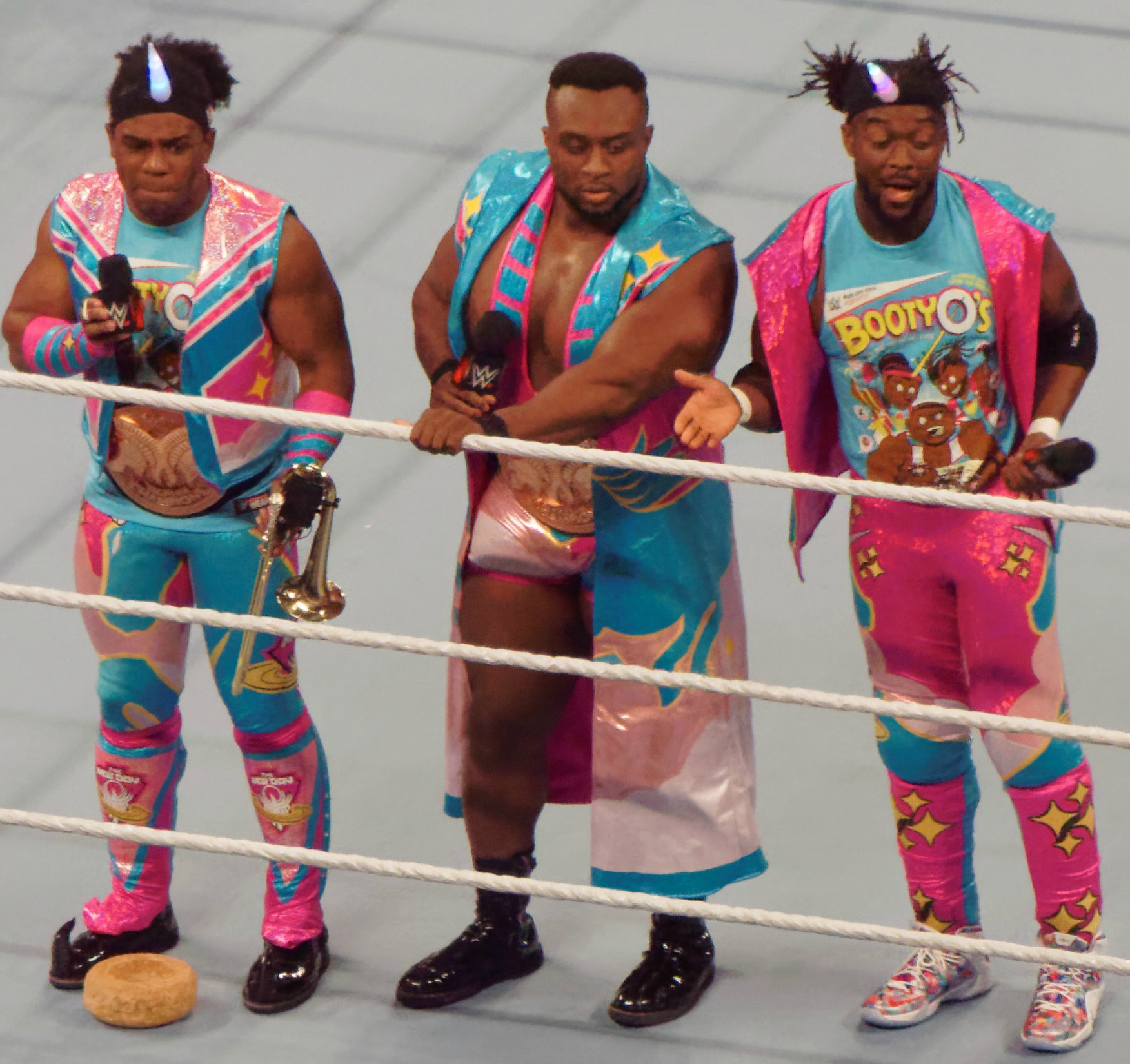
The New Day lost the Raw Tag Team Championship to Cesaro and Sheamus, ending their reign at 483 days, the longest reign for a tag team championship on WWE's main roster until November 2022.

The actual pay-per-view opened with The New Day (Big E and Kofi Kingston, accompanied by Xavier Woods) defending the Raw Tag Team Championship against Cesaro and Sheamus. Throughout the match, all four competitors executed their respective moves and finishers, but could not get the win. Also, Woods interfered in the match on a few occasions, but the match continued. In the end, as Sheamus was reaching for a tag, Cesaro pretended to tag in and entered the ring. Kingston, assuming Cesaro was the legal man, executed Trouble in Paradise on Cesaro and attempted to pin him only for Sheamus to roll him up for a pinfall victory. This ended The New Day's reign at 483 days, the longest reign for a tag team championship on WWE's main roster until The Usos (Jey Uso and Jimmy Uso) broke the record with the SmackDown Tag Team Championship in November 2022.

Next, Sami Zayn faced Braun Strowman in a match in which he had to survive the 10-minute time limit. Strowman dominated most of the match. At about four minutes remaining in the match, Mick Foley appeared and presumed to throw in the towel for Zayn but Zayn threw the towel into the crowd. Zayn then sent Strowman into the ring post. Moments later, Strowman charged at Zayn, who moved out of the way, causing Strowman to crash into the timekeeper's area. When Strowman beat the count, Zayn executed a top-rope Crossbody for a nearfall. Zayn then performed a Helluva Kick on Strowman as the time limit expired. Zayn was declared the winner.

After that, Seth Rollins faced Chris Jericho. At the climax, Kevin Owens came out to distract Rollins, allowing Jericho to roll up Rollins for a nearfall. Jericho then argued with Owens and told Owens to leave. Jericho attempted a Codebreaker but Rollins countered into a Pedigree to win the match.

In the fourth match, Rich Swann defended the Cruiserweight Championship in a triple threat match against T. J. Perkins and Brian Kendrick. In the end, after Swann and Perkins performed a double superkick on Kendrick, Swann executed a Spin Kick on Perkins to win the match and retain the title. After the match, Neville returned and attacked Swann and Perkins, turning heel.

In the penultimate match, Sasha Banks defended the Raw Women's Championship against Charlotte Flair in a 30-minute Iron Man match. After Banks dominated, the momentum shifted when Charlotte caused Banks to fall face first on the steel ring steps. Later, Charlotte executed Natural Selection on Banks for a nearfall. Charlotte attempted a Moonsault, but Banks cut her off. However, Charlotte executed Natural Selection off the top rope on Banks to score the first point. Banks then rolled up Charlotte to make the score 1–1. Charlotte attempted a Moonsault, but Banks moved out of the way and applied the Bank Statement. Charlotte tried to make it to the bottom rope, but Banks brought her to the middle of the ring and reapplied the submission to force Charlotte to submit and make the score 2–1. Charlotte then focused on injuring Banks' leg for the remainder of the match. Banks managed a nearfall, but Charlotte applied the Figure Four Leglock. However, Banks was able to reverse the pressure, only for Charlotte to un-reverse it moments later. Banks attempted to get to the bottom rope, but Charlotte pulled her to the middle of the ring every time. Eventually, Charlotte bridged into the Figure Eight, and Banks submitted with just two seconds left on the clock, tying the score at 2–2 as the time expired. The referee ruled the match would continue in sudden death overtime. Banks managed two pinning combinations, but both resulted in nearfalls. In the end, Banks applied the Bank Statement, but Charlotte escaped by going after Banks' injured leg and applied the Figure Four Leglock. Charlotte bridged into the Figure Eight, and Banks, who had a bloodied nose at that point, eventually submitted. As a result, Charlotte won the match 3–2, and the title for a fourth time. This also ended their long rivalry, since it was stipulated that after the match, as long as one of them was the champion, the other could not challenge for the title.

=== Main event ===
In the main event, Kevin Owens defended the WWE Universal Championship against United States Champion Roman Reigns. During the match, Owens performed two Frog Splashes off the barricade on Reigns, with the second one through the German broadcast table. After Reigns made it back in the ring before he was counted out, Owens performed another Frog Splash in the ring for a near-fall. Reigns attempted a Spear, but Owens countered and rolled-up Reigns for a near-fall. Owens performed a Pop Up Powerbomb on Reigns but Reigns placed his foot on the bottom rope to void the pin. In the end, Owens attempted to hit Reigns with the title belt, but Reigns responded with a Spear. Chris Jericho appeared and performed a Codebreaker on Owens, causing Owens to win by disqualification and retain the title. Jericho handed a shocked Owens the title belt and congratulated him, revealing that it was his plan to ensure that Owens won. As Owens and Jericho attempted to leave, Seth Rollins blocked their way. Reigns then attacked Owens with a Spear and Rollins executed a Pedigree on Jericho. Reigns and Rollins then put Jericho through the Spanish broadcast table with a Double Powerbomb. Afterwards, Owens tried to retreat, but Reigns and Rollins stopped him and performed another Double Powerbomb on Owens through the other broadcast table.

== Reception ==
The Raw Tag Team, Universal, and Raw Women's championship matches were considered highlights of the event while the other matches received mixed-to-negative reviews.

Ryan Dilbert of Bleacher Report panned the Kickoff pre-show match, giving it a D− grade, stating that the "first act of this feud" was "underwhelming", "lacked the intensity it needed", and "did little to entice fans to stay tuned in". He also mentioned that "this storyline remains uncomfortable and off-the-mark", and that there was no reason to "root against Rusev". Also, "Amore's character, meanwhile, is veering off in the wrong direction".

For the Raw Tag Team Championship match, Bleacher Report stated that "more hype and better buildup would have made this an even bigger moment", but "it's huge for Cesaro and Sheamus" to end The New Day's then-record tag team title reign, and "high-octane action kicked off the PPV the right way". Dilbert concluded by stating that "the Raw tag team division did well to keep interesting heading into 2017". Wade Keller of Pro Wrestling Torch gave it 3 stars, stating that it was a "good match with a handful of convincing near-falls", but "the worst part of this title change is that it happened right after New Day set the record, so it just felt a little too convenient".

As for the Universal Championship match, Pro Wrestling Torch gave it 2.75 stars, stating that "it's tough to give a good review to a match where the crowd reacted the opposite of all TV time invested in both characters and the intent of the promoter". However, Roman Reigns and Kevin Owens "told a good story and executed the match well". Bleacher Report gave it an A grade, stating that "a more aggressive Owens, playing a menacing, serious heel again, was refreshing", and that "he and Reigns put on a strong effort, although a lot of rest holds hurt the action early". Also, despite the disqualification finish, it "made perfect sense with the story", and the powerful sights were "Jericho and Owens' reunion" and "Reigns and Rollins working together again".

For the Raw Women's Championship match, Pro Wrestling Torch gave it 3.25 stars, stating that it was a "good match", but "not without some issues. The Iron Man stip worked against it for the first 20 minutes or so", but "the overtime was well played and the recall of how important the bridging by Charlotte was right before regulation added drama to the actual finish in overtime". Bleacher Report gave it an A+ grade, the highest rated match of the event, stating that "time flew by in a lengthy, dramatic work of theater" and "a compelling story played out on the canvas as the rivals pushed each other to their limits once again". The match also "deftly used the Iron Man stipulation to add intrigue". However, Dilbert and Anthony Mango, also of Bleacher Report, disliked Sasha Banks' title reign ending early again. Dilbert stated that "WWE switching the title back so many times has hurt the power of each title win", making it "hard to get invested in the new champion this point", and that "WWE must let someone hold on to the gold for a sustained stretch now". Mango stated that "the purpose of an Iron Man match is to allow multiple decisions", and the most frustrating part is WWE always preferring to "allow none". He stated that "the first decision didn't come until 20 minutes into the action, meaning the first two-thirds of the match was just setup", and if it had "culminated in something epic, it would have been worth it, but the final third of this was only a slight improvement over the rest of it". Also, this Iron Man match "was just another one added" to the list of Iron Man matches that "kept the score at 0–0 for nearly its entirety", and "it just felt like a drag that didn't need to go into overtime", as well as Banks and Bayley having "a much better matchup back in NXT. Mango stated that the worst part of the storyline was Banks' unsuccessful title defenses on pay-per-view after winning it on Raw three times in a row. This is why "this doesn't matter as much as it potentially could have", and that Banks and Charlotte would start something new. Mango concluded by stating the fans to "rinse and repeat what you've seen the past few months–but with Bayley's name instead of Banks'.

Dave Meltzer of the Wrestling Observer Newsletter gave the Raw Women's, Universal championship, and the Seth Rollins vs. Chris Jericho matches 3 stars. The Raw Tag Team Championship match received 3.5 stars, the highest of the event, the Cruiserweight Championship match received 1.75 stars, the Sami Zayn vs. Braun Strowman match received 1.25 stars, and the pre-show match was the only-non rated match at the event.

== Aftermath ==
On the following episode of Raw, Kevin Owens and Chris Jericho celebrated, stating their friendship was even stronger now. Mick Foley then scheduled a rematch for the WWE Universal Championship between Owens and Roman Reigns at the Royal Rumble, and decided that Jericho would be suspended above the ring inside a shark cage, ensuring that Jericho would not interfere. He also threatened that if Jericho did not enter the cage, he would be fired. The following week, Rollins continued his antagonizing of Triple H, calling Triple H a coward to his wife Stephanie McMahon.

Also on Raw, Braun Strowman, angry at his failure to defeat Sami Zayn, began wreaking havoc backstage. Since Zayn was not present on Raw, Strowman attacked Titus O'Neil and Sin Cara during their match, and then attacked Roman Reigns and Seth Rollins in their tag team match against Kevin Owens and Chris Jericho. The following week, Zayn attacked Strowman during his match with Rollins, but was eventually chased out of the arena by Strowman. This culminated in a Last Man Standing match between the two on the January 2, 2017, episode, where Strowman won.

Big Cass lost a rematch against Rusev by disqualification after he continued to beat his opponent in the corner, ignoring the referee. Later, Enzo Amore was forced to attend a sensitivity training for accidentally exposing himself a few weeks back. After the session, Rusev and Jinder Mahal attacked Enzo. On the January 2, 2017, episode, Enzo and Cass were scheduled to face Rusev and Mahal in a tag team match, but due to Enzo's injury, Cass faced Rusev and Mahal in a handicap match, where he lost. Enzo was medically cleared to compete on the January 16 episode, where he and Cass defeated Rusev and Mahal.

Also on the following Raw, Mick Foley congratulated Cesaro and Sheamus on their title victory and presented them with a new set of championship belts. The New Day (Kofi Kingston and Xavier Woods) invoked their rematch clause for the championship on the December 26 episode of Raw, but were unsuccessful. The champions then entered a feud with Luke Gallows and Karl Anderson, leading to a championship match on the January 16, 2017, episode of Raw that had a controversial ending. A rematch for the Royal Rumble Kickoff pre-show was then scheduled with two referees.

Neville stated his intention to take out the entire cruiserweight division, now proclaiming himself "King of the Cruiserweights". This began a rivalry between Neville and Rich Swann, where on the January 10 episode of 205 Live, Swann accepted Neville's challenge for the WWE Cruiserweight Championship at the Royal Rumble.

Roadblock: End of the Line was the final event to carry the Roadblock name as another Roadblock was not scheduled for 2017. However, after five years, WWE revived the event for the NXT brand to be held as a special episode of NXT titled NXT: Roadblock on March 8, 2022. A second NXT: Roadblock was confirmed for the following year, thus establishing Roadblock as an annual March event for the brand, with NXT's Roadblock being a reference to its position on the "Road to Stand & Deliver", NXT's biggest event of year.

== Results ==
No.	Results	Stipulations	Times
1^{P}	Rusev (with Lana) defeated Big Cass (with Enzo Amore) by countout	Singles match	4:30
2	Cesaro and Sheamus defeated The New Day (Big E and Kofi Kingston) (c) (with Xavier Woods) by pinfall	Tag team match for the WWE Raw Tag Team Championship	10:10
3	Sami Zayn defeated Braun Strowman by surviving the time limit	Singles match with a 10-minute time limit	10:00
4	Seth Rollins defeated Chris Jericho by pinfall	Singles match	17:05
5	Rich Swann (c) defeated The Brian Kendrick and T. J. Perkins by pinfall	Triple threat match for the WWE Cruiserweight Championship	6:00
6	Charlotte Flair defeated Sasha Banks (c) in sudden death overtime (3–2)	30-minute Iron Woman match for the WWE Raw Women's Championship	34:45
7	Kevin Owens (c) defeated Roman Reigns by disqualification	Singles match for the WWE Universal Championship	23:20
(c) / – the champion(s) heading into the match; P / – the match was broadcast on the pre-show

=== Iron Woman match ===
Score		Point winner	Decision	Notes	Time
Banks	Flair	Point winner	Decision	Notes	Time
0	1	Charlotte Flair	Pinfall	Flair pinned Banks after Natural Selection off the top rope	19:45
1	1	Sasha Banks	Pinfall	Banks pinned Flair with a schoolgirl	21:40
2	1	Sasha Banks	Submission	Banks made Flair submit to the Bank Statement	24:00
2	2	Charlotte Flair	Submission	Flair made Banks submit to the Figure Eight Leglock	29:58
2	3	Charlotte Flair	Submission	Flair made Banks submit to the Figure Eight Leglock	34:45
