= Roadblock (March 2016) =

WWE Network event

- Promotional poster featuring Triple H and Dean Ambrose
- Promotion: WWE
- Date: March 12, 2016
- City: Toronto, Ontario, Canada
- Venue: Ricoh Coliseum
- Attendance: 9,000
- Tagline: Road Closed Ahead

WWE event chronology
← Previous; Fastlane	Next → NXT TakeOver: Dallas

Roadblock chronology
← Previous; First	Next → End of the Line

WWE Network specials chronology
← Previous; Live from Madison Square Garden	Next → Starrcade

WWE in Canada chronology
← Previous; Breaking Point	Next → NXT TakeOver: Toronto

Roadblock was a 2016 professional wrestling livestreaming event produced by the American promotion WWE. It was the inaugural Roadblock and took place on March 12, 2016, at the Ricoh Coliseum in Toronto, Ontario, Canada. The event aired exclusively on the WWE Network in the United States and via traditional pay-per-view in various territories outside of the U.S. The event's title was a reference to its position on the "Road to WrestleMania".

Nine matches were contested at the event, including two dark matches. The main event saw Triple H defeat Dean Ambrose to retain the WWE World Heavyweight Championship. Other prominent matches included The Revival (Dash Wilder and Scott Dawson) retaining the NXT Tag Team Championship against Enzo Amore and Colin Cassady, Brock Lesnar defeating Bray Wyatt and Luke Harper in a 2-on-1 handicap match, Charlotte retaining the WWE Divas Championship against Natalya in the last televised defense of the title, and in the opening bout, The New Day (Big E and Kofi Kingston) retained the WWE Tag Team Championship against The League of Nations (Sheamus and King Barrett).

The event was originally scheduled as a house show, a non-televised event, titled March to WrestleMania: Live from Toronto. To help further the build to WrestleMania 32, WWE decided to broadcast the event and renamed it as Roadblock, and it was the third of seven originally scheduled house shows to broadcast as a WWE Network special. This in turn made it the first time WWE held a PPV and livestreaming event in Canada since Breaking Point in September 2009. This was also the only Roadblock held before the reintroduction of the brand extension in July, with a second Roadblock, titled Roadblock: End of the Line, occurring later in the year in December, which was held exclusively for wrestlers from the Raw brand.

== Production ==
=== Background ===
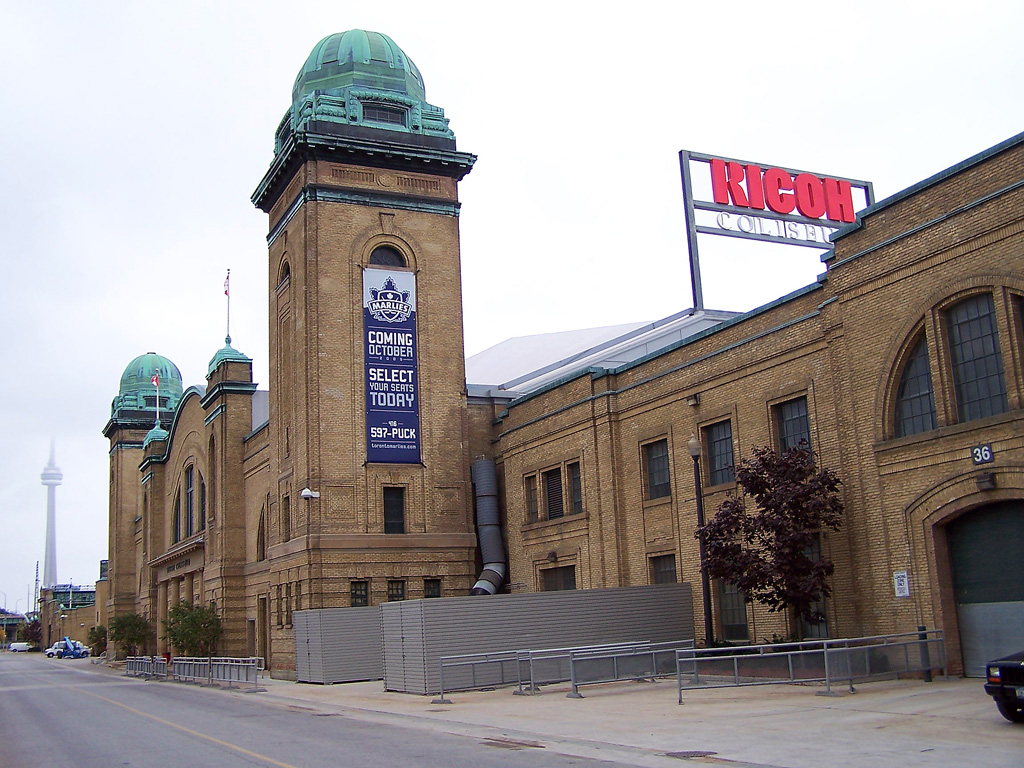
The inaugural Roadblock was held at the Ricoh Coliseum in Toronto, Ontario, Canada.

The American professional wrestling promotion WWE originally had a house show, a non-televised event, scheduled for March 12, 2016, at the Ricoh Coliseum in Toronto, Ontario, Canada, and it was titled "March to WrestleMania: Live from Toronto". To further build towards the following month's WrestleMania 32, WWE decided to broadcast the event live and exclusively on their livestreaming service the WWE Network in the United States and on pay-per-view (PPV) in various territories outside of the U.S. It was also renamed as Roadblock as a reference to its position on the "Road to WrestleMania". It was the third originally scheduled house show to broadcast as a WWE Network special, after The Beast in the East and Live from Madison Square Garden in July and October of 2015, respectively.

=== Storylines ===
On the February 29 episode of Raw, Dean Ambrose challenged Triple H to a match for the WWE World Heavyweight Championship. Later that night, Triple H interfered in Ambrose's match against Alberto Del Rio, causing a disqualification. Ambrose attacked Triple H, but Triple H stopped his onslaught with a Pedigree. He then accepted the challenge before attacking Ambrose again. The match was scheduled for Roadblock.

On the March 2 episode of NXT, NXT Tag Team Champions The Revival were scheduled to defend their titles against Enzo Amore and Colin Cassady at Roadblock.

At the Royal Rumble, Brock Lesnar eliminated Luke Harper, Erick Rowan, and Braun Strowman of The Wyatt Family from the Royal Rumble match. However, the trio re-entered the ring and eliminated Lesnar from the match. On the March 3 episode of SmackDown, a match between Lesnar and Bray Wyatt was scheduled for Roadblock.

On March 8, WWE Tag Team Champions The New Day (Kofi Kingston and Big E, with Xavier Woods) were scheduled to defend their titles against Sheamus and King Barrett (of The League of Nations) at Roadblock.

On March 11, a non-title match between Divas Champion Charlotte and Natalya was scheduled for the event. In a pre-recorded segment aired immediately before the match, Natalya goaded Charlotte into putting her title on the line in.

== Event ==
Other on-screen personnel
Role:	Name:
English Commentators	Michael Cole
English Commentators	John “Bradshaw” Layfield
English Commentators	Byron Saxton
Spanish Commentators	Marcelo Rodríguez
Spanish Commentators	Carlos Cabrera
Ring Announcer	JoJo
Referees	Dan Engler
Referees	Ryan Tran
Referees	John Cone
Referees	Darrick Moore

=== Preliminary matches ===
The event opened with The New Day (Big E and Kofi Kingston) defending the WWE Tag Team Championship against The League of Nations (Sheamus and King Barrett). Big E executed a Big Ending on Barrett to retain the titles.

Next, Chris Jericho faced Jack Swagger. Jericho forced Swagger to submit to the Walls of Jericho to win the match.

After that, The Revival (Scott Dawson and Dash Wilder) defended the NXT Tag Team Championship against Enzo Amore and Colin Cassady. The Revival executed the Shatter Machine on Amore to retain the titles.

In the fourth match, Charlotte defended the WWE Divas Championship against Natalya. Charlotte pinned Natalya with a roll-up using the ropes for leverage to retain the title.

The fifth match, originally pitting Brock Lesnar against Bray Wyatt, was changed into a 2-on-1 handicap match also involving Luke Harper. Wyatt remained outside the ring throughout the match. Harper executed a Big Boot, two Superkicks and a Discus Clothesline on Lesnar for a near-fall. Lesnar executed five German Suplexes and an F-5 on Harper to win the match.

In the penultimate match, Sami Zayn faced Stardust. Zayn executed a Helluva Kick on Stardust to win the match.

=== Main event ===
In the main event, Triple H defended the WWE World Heavyweight Championship against Dean Ambrose. During the match, Ambrose executed Dirty Deeds on Triple H, but the referee voided the count as Ambrose's foot was underneath the bottom rope. In the climax of the match, Ambrose executed a Diving Elbow Drop on Triple H, who was standing outside the ring. Ambrose attempted an Elbow Drop off the barricade on Triple H, who was draped on the announce table, but Triple H rolled off and Ambrose fell through the announce table. Triple H then executed a Pedigree to retain the title.

== Reception ==
The event received mixed reviews. Jason Powell of Pro Wrestling Dot Net commented, "Overall, Roadblock is what most of us thought it would be. They weren't going to shake up the WrestleMania lineup three weeks away. I know some fans convinced themselves it was possible, but it just never struck me as being realistic regardless of whether it would have made for a better WrestleMania lineup".

James Caldwell of Pro Wrestling Torch wrote that Roadblock was a "glorified house show for the most part, but the toned-down, less-corporate production value was refreshing for a WWE broadcast". Regarding the main event, Caldwell said that the "false finish for Dean was interesting in that WWE is lacking goodwill heading into Mania and going that far with a false finish straddled the line of being more of a turn-off than heat-generator".

John Powell of Slam Wrestling summed up that there were "no surprises at a solid Roadblock... Although the overall show was far better than any of the WWE's recent pay-per-views, Roadblock did nothing at all to fuel any kind of excitement for WrestleMania or its feuds". For the main event, Powell wrote, "In the match of his career, Ambrose proved beyond a shadow of a doubt he is main event material, perhaps soon to be following in the legendary but demented footsteps of another unorthodox superstar, one Mick Foley". Powell also praised Canadians "Natalya, Chris Jericho and Sami Zayn all putting in exceptional performances", as well as the four NXT wrestlers who proved "why NXT is still the show to watch each and every week". However, commentator JBL was criticized after he "literally loses his mind and starts yelling". His grade went to Triple H vs. Dean Ambrose with 8 and a half out of 10 while Brock Lesnar vs. Bray Wyatt and Luke Harper got the worst with a 5 out of 10.

Larry Csonka from 411Mania gave the event a 7 stars out of 10 rating. The highest rated match was Ambrose vs. Triple H (4 stars), judging that the match "was a lot of fun and felt fresh, but it wasn't without its problems", while Stardust vs. Zayn was rated the lowest (1 star). Csonka also praised the NXT Tag Team Championship match (3 1/2 stars) and the WWE Tag Team Championship match (3 stars).

== Aftermath ==
This edition of Roadlock featured the final televised defense of the WWE Divas Championship, as during the WrestleMania 32 pre-show the following month, the Divas Championship was retired and replaced by a new WWE Women's Championship.

The Roadblock name would be reused for the promotion's December event that same year. It was held exclusively for wrestlers from the Raw brand division after the promotion had reintroduced the brand extension in July, again splitting its main roster into two separate brands called Raw and SmackDown where wrestlers were exclusively assigned to perform, and in addition to the WWE Network, the event was available through traditional pay-per-view (PPV) outlets. This second event was titled Roadblock: End of the Line as it was WWE's final PPV and livestreaming event of 2016. Roadblock was then discontinued; however, after six years, Roadblock was reinstated for the NXT brand in 2022 as a television special titled NXT: Roadblock, which was a reference to its position on the "Road to Stand & Deliver", NXT's biggest event of the year. A second NXT: Roadblock was confirmed for the following year, thus establishing Roadblock as an annual March event for NXT.

== Results ==
No.	Results	Stipulations	Times
1^{D}	Mark Henry defeated Randy Sharp	Singles match	3:35
2^{D}	Goldust (with R-Truth) defeated Viktor (with Konnor)	Singles match	6:44
3	The New Day (Big E and Kofi Kingston) (c) (with Xavier Woods) defeated The League of Nations (King Barrett and Sheamus) by pinfall	Tag team match for the WWE Tag Team Championship	9:49
4	Chris Jericho defeated Jack Swagger by submission	Singles match	7:54
5	The Revival (Dash Wilder and Scott Dawson) (c) defeated Enzo and Cass (with Carmella) by pinfall	Tag team match for the NXT Tag Team Championship	10:17
6	Charlotte (c) (with Ric Flair) defeated Natalya by pinfall	Singles match for the WWE Divas Championship	13:37
7	Brock Lesnar (with Paul Heyman) defeated The Wyatt Family (Bray Wyatt and Luke Harper) by pinfall	2-on-1 handicap match	4:03
8	Sami Zayn defeated Stardust	Singles match	12:33
9	Triple H (c) defeated Dean Ambrose by pinfall	Singles match for the WWE World Heavyweight Championship	24:43
(c) / – the champion(s) heading into the match; D / – this was a dark match
