= NXT Deadline (2023) =

WWE premium live event

- Promotional poster featuring Ilja Dragunov, Tiffany Stratton, Lyra Valkyria, Baron Corbin, and Carmelo Hayes
- Promotion: WWE
- Brand: NXT
- Date: December 9, 2023
- City: Bridgeport, Connecticut
- Venue: Total Mortgage Arena
- Attendance: 5,529

WWE event chronology
← Previous; Survivor Series: WarGames	Next → Royal Rumble

NXT Deadline chronology
← Previous; 2022	Next → 2024

NXT major events chronology
← Previous; No Mercy	Next → Vengeance Day

The 2023 NXT Deadline (stylized as DEADL1NE) was a professional wrestling premium live event (PLE) produced by WWE, held for wrestlers from the promotion's developmental brand, NXT. It was the second annual Deadline and took place on Saturday, December 9, 2023, at the Total Mortgage Arena in Bridgeport, Connecticut. The event was based around the Iron Survivor Challenge for both the men and women, a 25-minute five-person match in which a wrestler attempts to score the most falls before the deadline in order to win and earn a match for the NXT Championship and NXT Women's Championship, respectively.

Seven matches were contested at the event, including one on the Kickoff pre-show. While the event was primarily held for NXT, a couple of wrestlers from WWE's main roster brands, Raw and SmackDown, also performed. In the main event, Ilja Dragunov defeated Baron Corbin to retain the NXT Championship. For the event's Iron Survivor Challenges, Trick Williams won the men's, while the women's was won by Blair Davenport. In other prominent matches, Carmelo Hayes defeated Lexis King and in the opening bout, SmackDown's Dragon Lee defeated Raw's "Dirty" Dominik Mysterio to win the NXT North American Championship. The event also notably saw the return of Cora Jade, who had been on hiatus since August.

This was the first Deadline to livestream on Binge in Australia and Abema in Japan. This was also WWE's last PLE to involve Vince McMahon or any other member of the McMahon family—aside from McMahon's son-in-law, Paul "Triple H" Levesque—in any capacity before his resignation as executive chairman of TKO Group Holdings the next month due to the sex trafficking scandal involving a former WWE employee.

== Production ==
=== Background ===
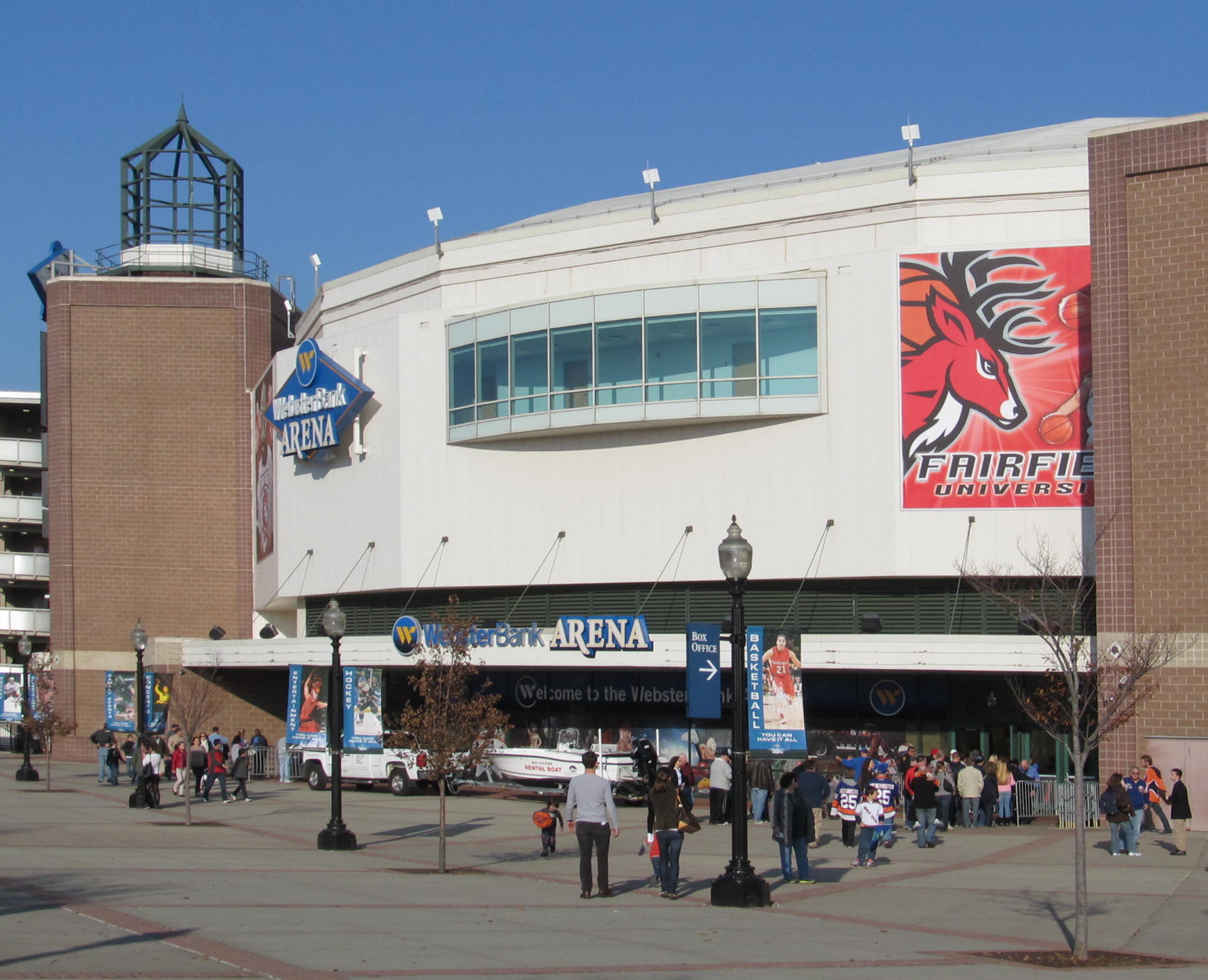
The second annual Deadline was held at the Total Mortgage Arena in Bridgeport, Connecticut (pictured in 2012 under its previous name of Webster Bank Arena).

In December 2022, the American professional wrestling promotion WWE held a premium live event (PLE) for its developmental brand, NXT, called Deadline, which replaced the previously annual event, WarGames. The inaugural Deadline debuted the Iron Survivor Challenge for both the men and women, a five-person match in which a wrestler attempts to score the most falls before the 25-minute time limit (the "deadline") expires to earn a future match for the NXT Championship and NXT Women's Championship, respectively.

On September 28, 2023, WWE announced the return of Deadline, thus establishing Deadline as NXT's annual December event. It was scheduled to be held on Saturday, December 9, 2023, at Total Mortgage Arena in Bridgeport, Connecticut. This was the first televised WWE event held at this venue since NXT TakeOver: XXV in June 2019, when the arena was known as the Webster Bank Arena (renamed in 2022).

=== Broadcast outlets ===
The PLE was broadcast on WWE's livestreaming platforms. These included Peacock in the United States, SonyLIV in India, Disney+ Hotstar in Indonesia, Disney+ in the Philippines, Binge in Australia, Abema in Japan, and the WWE Network everywhere else. It was the first Deadline to livestream on Binge and Abema, after those countries' respective versions of the WWE Network merged under those services in January and October, respectively.

=== Storylines ===
The event comprised seven matches, including one on the Kickoff pre-show, that resulted from scripted storylines. Results were predetermined by WWE's writers on the NXT brand, while storylines were produced on WWE's weekly television program, NXT, and the supplementary online streaming show, Level Up.

Qualifying matches for the men's Iron Survivor Challenge began on the November 7 episode of NXT. Dijak became the first qualified entrant by defeating Tyler Bate. The following week, Trick Williams qualified by defeating Joe Coffey. On the November 21 episode, Josh Briggs qualified by defeating Carmelo Hayes. The following week, Bron Breakker qualified by defeating Eddy Thorpe. On the December 5 episode, the final spot in the men's Iron Survivor Challenge was determined by a last chance fatal four-way match between Bate, Coffey, Hayes, and Thorpe, which Bate won.

Qualifying matches for the women's Iron Survivor Challenge also began on the November 7 episode of NXT. Tiffany Stratton became the first qualified entrant by defeating Fallon Henley. The following week, Lash Legend qualified by defeating Roxanne Perez. On the November 21 episode, Blair Davenport qualified by defeating Thea Hail. The following week, Kelani Jordan qualified by defeating Kiana James. On the December 5 episode, the final spot in the women's Iron Survivor Challenge was determined by a last chance fatal four-way match between Henley, Perez, Hail, and James, which Henley won.

After Ilja Dragunov's successful defense of the NXT Championship on Night 2 of NXT: Halloween Havoc, Baron Corbin attacked Dragunov backstage and threatened him. On the November 14 episode of NXT, Dragunov attempted to try and attack Corbin after the latter's match, but Corbin stopped and attacked him. Dragunov then accepted Corbin's challenge for an NXT Championship match at Deadline.

On the July 18 episode of NXT, Raw's "Dirty" Dominik Mysterio defeated Wes Lee to win the NXT North American Championship after interference from his Judgment Day stablemates. After failing to regain the title at The Great American Bash, Lee set his sights on the NXT Championship, which he failed to win at NXT: Heatwave. On the September 12 episode of NXT, Lee failed to become the number one contender for the NXT Championship. Lee was later seen clearing out his locker and when asked about it, Lee said that he was going home and that he was done. Lee returned a month later during Night 2 of NXT: Halloween Havoc and attacked Mysterio after his successful title defense. On the November 28 episode of NXT, as demanded by Mysterio the week before, Lee defeated three former NXT North American Champions in a fatal four-way match to earn a title match against Mysterio at Deadline. The following week, however, Lee announced that he had a legitimate back injury and was not medically cleared to compete. SmackDown's Dragon Lee was then revealed as a replacement to face Mysterio for the title at Deadline with Rey Mysterio in Dragon Lee's corner.

On Night 1 of NXT: Halloween Havoc, Roxanne Perez defeated Kiana James in a Devil's Playground match. Two weeks later, James agreed with Tiffany Stratton that Perez should not be in the Iron Survivor Challenge. James subsequently cost Perez her qualifying match, with Perez in turn costing James hers. On the December 5 episode, Ava announced that James would face Perez in a Steel Cage match at Deadline.

On the December 5 episode of NXT, Axiom and Nathan Frazer had their match interrupted by the competitors in the women's Iron Survivor Challenge, causing the match to end in a no contest. A rematch between Axiom and Frazer was later scheduled for the Deadline Kickoff pre-show.

On the October 17 episode of NXT, Trick Williams was added to a triple threat match to make it a fatal four-way match to earn an NXT Championship match at NXT: Halloween Havoc. This announcement caused a rift between Williams and longtime friend Carmelo Hayes. Before the match began, Williams was found attacked backstage by an unknown assailant and had to be taken to a hospital. Later that night, Hayes went on to win the match. Two weeks later on Night 2 of NXT: Halloween Havoc, Hayes failed to regain the title from Ilja Dragunov after being distracted by the returning Williams. The following week, Williams confronted Hayes and asked if he was the one who attacked him before being interrupted by Lexis King. Williams tried to attack King, but accidentally hit Hayes instead. Two weeks later, King cost Hayes his qualifying match for the Iron Survivor Challenge. On the December 5 episode of NXT, Hayes challenged King to a match at Deadline, which was made official.

== Event ==
Other on-screen personnel
Role:	Name:
Commentators	Vic Joseph
Commentators	Booker T
Commentators	Rey Mysterio (NXT North American Title match)
Spanish commentators	Marcelo Rodríguez
Spanish commentators	Jerry Soto
Ring announcer	Alicia Taylor
Referees	Adrian Butler
Referees	Chip Danning
Referees	Dallas Irvin
Referees	Derek Sanders
Referees	Felix Fernandez
Referees	Jeremy Marcus
Interviewer	Kelly Kincaid
Pre-show panel	Megan Morant
Pre-show panel	Matt Camp
Pre-show panel	Sam Roberts

=== Pre-show ===
There was only one match that took place on the NXT Deadline Pre-show in which Axiom faced Nathan Frazer. In the opening stages, Frazer delivered a springboard reverse DDT to Axiom for a two count. Axiom then performed a half-and-half suplex and a PK to Frazer for a two count. Axiom then delivered an Orihara moonsault, but as he attempted to go to the top rope, Frazer stopped him and performed a superplex into a twisting suplex for a two count. As Frazer attempted a Phoenix Splash, Axiom stopped him and hit an enzeguiri. Axiom then landed an avalanche Spanish Fly and hit the Golden Ratio on Frazer to win the match.

=== Preliminary matches ===
The PLE began with NXT Head of Creative, Shawn Michaels, coming out and hyping the crowd by asking if they were ready. This brought out CM Punk, in his first NXT appearance since August 2012. Punk then endorsed Michaels and teased signing with NXT.

In the first match, "Dirty" Dominik Mysterio defended the NXT North American Championship against Dragon Lee (accompanied by Rey Mysterio). In the opening stages, Lee landed a somersault plancha and a slingshot hurricarana to Dominik for a two count. Lee then locked in a Fujiwara Armbar on Dominik, but Dominik reached the bottom ropes. Dominik then delivered an apron DDT to Lee for a two count. Dominik then performed a slingshot senton to Lee for a nearfall. Lee then delivered a diving double foot stomp to Dominik onto the outside. Back in the ring as Lee attempted the Asai DDT, Dominik impeded it with a dropkick for a two count. Lee then delivered a snap German suplex, but as he attempted a sit-out powerbomb, Dominik escaped and hit a sit-out powerbomb for a nearfall. Dominik then attempted the 619, but Lee escaped and delivered a sit-out powerbomb for a nearfall. Lee then hit the Asai DDT on Dominik to win the North American title.

Next was the Women's Iron Survivor Challenge contested between Blair Davenport, Lash Legend, Fallon Henley, Tiffany Stratton, and Kelani Jordan. Davenport and Henley started the match. Stratton was the next to enter. Stratton delivered an Alabama Slam to Henley for a two count. Davenport then threw Stratton out of the ring and pinned Henley to score her first fall (Davenport 1–Henley 0–Stratton 0–Legend 0–Jordan 0). Jordan entered the match next. Henley then performed a Blockbuster and the Shining Wizard to Stratton to score her first fall (Davenport 1–Henley 1–Stratton 0–Legend 0–Jordan 0). Legend entered the match last. She delivered a chokeslam to Stratton and a powerbomb to Henley and placed Henley on top of Stratton and simultaneously pinned both women to score two falls (Davenport 1–Henley 1–Stratton 0–Legend 2–Jordan 0). The Meta-Four (Noam Dar, Oro Mensah, and Jakara Jackson) then came out to prevent Stratton and Henley from escaping the penalty box. Henley escaped through the top of the box, but Stratton pushed her off the top of it, crashing through the commentator's table. Stratton then landed a diving senton to Meta-Four from the top of the penalty box. Davenport then landed a diving double foot stomp to Jordan and pinned her to score her second fall (Davenport 2–Henley 1–Stratton 0–Legend 2–Jordan 0). Stratton then performed a rolling Death Valley Driver to Jordan and hit the Prettiest Moonsault Ever on Legend and pinned Legend to score her first fall (Davenport 2–Henley 1–Stratton 1–Legend 2–Jordan 0). Davenport then hit the Kamigoye on Jordan and pinned her to score her third and decisive fall (Davenport 3–Henley 1–Stratton 1–Legend 2–Jordan 0). The buzzer then sounded, declaring Davenport the Iron Survivor and earning an NXT Women's Championship match at NXT: New Year's Evil. After the match, Davenport called out champion Lyra Valkyria and said that she would beat Valkyria for the title. As Valkyria was making her way onto the ramp, Cora Jade made her return to NXT for the first time since the July 25 episode of NXT, and proceeded to attack Valkyria.

After that, Carmelo Hayes faced Lexis King. In the closing stages, King hit a double foot stomp to Hayes for a two count. King then delivered two backbreakers and a running knee strike to Hayes for another nearfall. Hayes then performed a springboard DDT and La Mistica to King for a two count. King then hit Hayes with a Jackhammer for a nearfall. Hayes then pushed King into the steel steps and delivered a step-up enzeguiri for a two count. King hit a backbreaker, but Hayes then hit the First 48 Codebreaker and then the Nothing But Net on King for the win.

The fourth match was the Men's Iron Survivor Challenge contested between Trick Williams, Bron Breakker, Dijak, Josh Briggs, and Tyler Bate. Dijak and Briggs started the match. Dijak hit Feast Your Eyes on Briggs to score his first fall (Dijak 1–Briggs 0–Breakker 0–Bate 0–Williams 0). Bate then entered the match next. Briggs delivered a running lariat to Dijak to score his first fall (Dijak 1–Briggs 1–Breakker 0–Bate 0–Williams 0). As Dijak attempted Feast Your Eyes on Bate, he escaped and used a schoolboy pin on Dijak to score his first fall (Dijak 1–Briggs 1–Breakker 0–Bate 1–Williams 0). Williams entered the match next. Bate performed a step-up enzeguiri, a slingshot clothesline, and the Tyler Driver '97 to Williams to score his second fall (Dijak 1–Briggs 1–Breakker 0–Bate 2–Williams 0). Breakker entered the match last and delivered three consecutive spears to Briggs, Bate, and Dijak to score three consecutive falls (Dijak 1–Briggs 1–Breakker 3–Bate 2–Williams 0). Williams then delivered a flying crossbody to everyone on the outside, but as he attempted to enter back in the ring, Breakker stopped him. Dijak then hit a Cyclone Boot on Williams to score his second fall (Dijak 2–Briggs 1–Breakker 3–Bate 2–Williams 0). Breakker and Bate then delivered a Frankensteiner/Powerbomb combination onto Dijak, with Bate scoring his third fall (Dijak 2–Briggs 1–Breakker 3–Bate 3–Williams 0). Briggs and Dijak then hit stereo moonsaults onto Williams and Breakker to score their second and third falls, respectively (Dijak 3–Briggs 2–Breakker 3–Bate 3–Williams 0). As Dijak attempted another Feast Your Eyes, Briggs escaped and Williams used a schoolboy pin on Briggs to score his first fall, but Dijak immediately delivered a big boot to Williams (Dijak 3–Briggs 2–Breakker 3–Bate 3–Williams 1). Dijak then landed Feast Your Eyes on Williams, but Eddy Thorpe came out and pulled the referee out of the ring to stop the count. Thorpe then hit Dijak onto the turnbuckles and delivered an enzeguiri to him, allowing Williams to use another schoolboy pin on Dijak to score his second fall (Dijak 3–Briggs 2–Breakker 3–Bate 3–Williams 2). Bate then delivered a Tornillo splash and attempted the Tyler Driver '97, but Williams reversed it into a jacknife pin to score his third fall (Dijak 3–Briggs 2–Breakker 3–Bate 3–Williams 3). Breakker then attempted a Spear, but Williams impeded it with a running pump knee strike and pinned Breakker to score his fourth and decisive fall (Dijak 3–Briggs 2–Breakker 3–Bate 3–Williams 4). The buzzer sounded and Williams was declared the Iron Survivor, thus earning an NXT Championship match at NXT: New Year's Evil.

In the penultimate match, Roxanne Perez faced Kiana James in a Steel Cage match. In the opening stages, Perez delivered a running dropkick to James for a two count. James then performed a Spear to Perez into the cage followed by a spinebuster for a two count. Perez then hit a basement dropkick and a Side Russian legsweep to James for a two count. Perez delivered a spinning back kick to James and threatened Kiana with a steel chair. As Perez was making her way to the cage door, Izzi Dame came out and slammed the cage door into Perez's face. James then hit Perez with a chair shot and hit The Deal Breaker and pinned Perez to win the match.

=== Main event ===
In the main event, Ilja Dragunov defended the NXT Championship against Baron Corbin. In the opening stages, Corbin attempted a clothesline to Dragunov, but Dragunov ducked and delivered a German suplex to Corbin on the outside. Corbin then performed a Gourd buster and an Uranage to Dragunov for a two count. Dragunov attempted a senton, but Corbin escaped and hit a flying clothesline for a nearfall. Corbin then delivered a DDT and a gutbuster to Dragunov. Corbin attempted a chokeslam, but Dragunov blocked it and delivered a running knee strike and a senton bomb. Dragunov delivered a running Death Valley Driver into the turbuckles and attempted the Torpedo Moscow, but Corbin intercepted it with a Deep Six for a nearfall. Corbin then performed a Death Valley Driver and a brainbuster for a two count. Corbin attempted the End of Days, but Dragunov stood back up and delivered a powerbomb and a Coast-to-Coast. Corbin attempted another End of Days, but Dragunov escaped and performed a leaping DDT and three consecutive H-Bombs. Dragunov then hugged Corbin and delivered the Torpedo Moscow and pinned him to retain the NXT title.

== Reception ==
Wrestling journalist Dave Meltzer of the Wrestling Observer Newsletter rated the Axiom-Frazer match 4 stars, the NXT North American Championship match and the Women's Iron Survivor match 3.75 stars, the Hayes-Lexis King bout 3 stars, the Men's Iron Survivor Challenge 4.5 stars (the highest rated match on the card), the Steel Cage match 2.5 stars (the lowest rated match on the card) and the NXT Championship match 3.5 stars.

== Results ==
No.	Results	Stipulations	Times
1^{P}	Axiom defeated Nathan Frazer by pinfall	Singles match	10:50
2	Dragon Lee (with Rey Mysterio) defeated "Dirty" Dominik Mysterio (c) by pinfall	Singles match for the NXT North American Championship	10:33
3	Blair Davenport (3) defeated Tiffany Stratton (1), Lash Legend (2), Kelani Jordan (0), and Fallon Henley (1)	Women's Iron Survivor Challenge to determine the #1 contender for the NXT Women's Championship at NXT: New Year's Evil	25:00
4	Carmelo Hayes defeated Lexis King by pinfall	Singles match	11:12
5	Trick Williams (4) defeated Dijak (3), Josh Briggs (2), Bron Breakker (3), and Tyler Bate (3)	Men's Iron Survivor Challenge to determine the #1 contender for the NXT Championship at NXT: New Year's Evil	25:00
6	Kiana James defeated Roxanne Perez by pinfall	Steel Cage match	11:27
7	Ilja Dragunov (c) defeated Baron Corbin by pinfall	Singles match for the NXT Championship	20:55
(c) / – the champion(s) heading into the match; P / – the match was broadcast on the pre-show

=== Women's Iron Survivor Challenge statistics ===
- Entry Order: Fallon Henley, Blair Davenport, Tiffany Stratton, Kelani Jordan, and Lash Legend

Score					Point winner	Fall loser	Decision	Notes	Time
Davenport	Henley	Jordan	Legend	Stratton	Point winner	Fall loser	Decision	Notes	Time
1	0	0	0	0	Blair Davenport	Fallon Henley	Pinfall	Pinned after Stratton hit Henley with an Alabama Slam	9:45
1	1	0	0	0	Fallon Henley	Tiffany Stratton	Pinfall	Pinned after the Hoe Down	12:11
1	1	0	2	0	Lash Legend	Tiffany Stratton	Pinfall	Pinned after a chokeslam	16:26 (Note: Legend dragged Henley over Stratton and pinned both of them simultaneously.)
1	1	0	2	0	Lash Legend	Fallon Henley	Pinfall	Pinned after a powerbomb	16:26
2	1	0	2	0	Blair Davenport	Kelani Jordan	Pinfall	Pinned after the Flawless Victory	20:15
2	1	0	2	1	Tiffany Stratton	Lash Legend	Pinfall	Pinned after the Prettiest Moonsault Ever	23:10
3	1	0	2	1	Blair Davenport	Fallon Henley	Pinfall	Pinned after the Fatality	24:43
Winner					Blair Davenport	—N/a			25:00

=== Men's Iron Survivor Challenge statistics ===
- Entry Order: Dijak, Josh Briggs, Tyler Bate, Trick Williams, and Bron Breakker

Score					Point winner	Fall loser	Decision	Notes	Time
Bate	Breakker	Briggs	Dijak	Williams	Point winner	Fall loser	Decision	Notes	Time
0	0	0	1	0	Dijak	Josh Briggs	Pinfall	Pinned after Feast Your Eyes	5:00
0	0	1	1	0	Josh Briggs	Dijak	Pinfall	Pinned after a lariat	7:02
1	0	1	1	0	Tyler Bate	Dijak	Pinfall	Pinned with a schoolboy	9:02
2	0	1	1	0	Tyler Bate	Trick Williams	Pinfall	Pinned after the Tyler Driver '97	13:55
2	1	1	1	0	Bron Breakker	Josh Briggs	Pinfall	Pinned after a spear	15:15
2	2	1	1	0	Bron Breakker	Tyler Bate	Pinfall	Pinned after a spear	15:24
2	3	1	1	0	Bron Breakker	Dijak	Pinfall	Pinned after a spear	15:34
2	3	1	2	0	Dijak	Trick Williams	Pinfall	Pinned after a spinning big boot	17:54
3	3	1	2	0	Tyler Bate	Dijak	Pinfall	Pinned after a Frankensteiner from Breakker into a sit-out powerbomb	18:28
3	3	2	3	0	Dijak	Trick Williams	Pinfall	Pinned after a moonsault	21:08 (Note: Dijak and Briggs simultaneously pinned Williams and Breakker, respectively.)
3	3	2	3	0	Josh Briggs	Bron Breakker	Pinfall	Pinned after a moonsault	21:08
3	3	2	3	1	Trick Williams	Josh Briggs	Pinfall	Pinned with a schoolboy	23:46
3	3	2	3	2	Trick Williams	Dijak	Pinfall	Pinned with a schoolboy	24:27
3	3	2	3	3	Trick Williams	Tyler Bate	Pinfall	Pinned with a jackknife hold	24:40
3	3	2	3	4	Trick Williams	Bron Breakker	Pinfall	Pinned after the Trick Shot	24:56
Winner					Trick Williams	—N/a			25:00
