= List of WWE SmackDown special episodes =

This is a list of special episodes of the professional wrestling television series WWE SmackDown. Throughout its broadcast history, the show has aired editions that have different themes. Some of them are yearly events such as the WWE draft. Others include tributes to various professional wrestlers who have recently died or retired from actively performing.

== 1999 ==
#	Title	Significance	Dates		Venue	Location	Final match	Rating (millions)
#	Title	Significance	Taping	Airing	Venue	Location	Final match	Rating (millions)
1	SmackDown!	Pilot episode	April 27	April 29	New Haven Coliseum	New Haven, Connecticut	The Rock and "Stone Cold" Steve Austin vs. Triple H and The Undertaker	3.10/5.80 share
2	SmackDown!	Debut episode	August 24	August 26	Kemper Arena	Kansas City, Missouri	Triple H (c) vs. The Rock for the WWF Championship	4.2
15	SmackDown!	Thanksgiving edition	November 23	November 25	Blue Cross Arena	Rochester, New York	Shane McMahon and Test vs. Triple H and X-Pac	—N/a
19	SmackDown!	Christmas edition	December 21	December 23	Reunion Arena	Dallas, Texas	Big Show (c) vs. Mankind for the WWF Championship; Triple H was locked in a shark cage above the ring.	—N/a
20	SmackDown!	Featured Mick Foley's career 3 days after his kayfabe firing.	December 28	December 30	Richmond Coliseum	Richmond, Virginia	Big Show vs. New Age Outlaws (Billy Gunn and Road Dogg) and X-Pac in a 3-on-1 Handicap match If Show wins, X-Pac will be fired.	—N/a

== 2000s ==
=== 2000 ===
Date	Episode	Venue	Location	Final match	Rating (millions)	Notes
January 6	New Year's SmackDown!	TD Waterhouse Centre	Orlando, Florida	Triple H (c) vs. Rikishi Phatu for the WWF Championship	—N/a	Taped on January 4
September 7	SmackDown! 2000–01 Season Premiere	Freedom Hall	Louisville, Kentucky	The Rock (c) vs. Christian and Kane in a 2-on-1 Handicap match for the WWF Championship	—N/a	Taped on September 5
November 23	Thanksgiving SmackDown!	National Car Rental Center	Fort Lauderdale, Florida	"Stone Cold" Steve Austin and Chris Jericho vs. Chris Benoit and Kane	—N/a	Taped on November 21
December 21	Christmas SmackDown!	Charlotte Coliseum	Charlotte, North Carolina	The Rock and The Undertaker (c) vs. Edge and Christian for the WWF Tag Team Championship	—N/a	Taped December 19
December 28	New Year's Eve SmackDown!	Gaylord Entertainment Center	Nashville, Tennessee	The Rock and The Undertaker vs. Kane, William Regal, and Rikishi in a 3-on-2 Handicap match	—N/a	Taped December 23

=== 2001 ===
Date	Episode	Venue	Location	Final match	Rating (millions)	Notes
January 4	New Year's SmackDown!	Freeman Coliseum	San Antonio, Texas	Kane vs. "Stone Cold" Steve Austin vs. The Undertaker in a Triple Threat match to determine the #1 contender for the WWF Championship	—N/a	Taped December 30
February 1	SmackDown! Xtreme	Nationwide Arena	Columbus, Ohio	Kurt Angle (c) vs. The Rock vs. Triple H in a Triple Threat match for the WWF Championship	4.0	Taped January 30; Promoted the start of the 2001 XFL season
July 12	SmackDown! 100	Birmingham-Jefferson Convention Complex	Birmingham, Alabama	The Undertaker and Kurt Angle vs. Shane McMahon and Diamond Dallas Page	—N/a	100th SmackDown! episode; Taped July 10
August 16	SmackDown! Live	E Center	Salt Lake City, Utah	The Rock vs. Booker T in a Lights Out match	4.3	1st live SmackDown! episode
September 4	Tuesday SmackDown!	Air Canada Centre	Toronto, Ontario, Canada	"Stone Cold" Steve Austin vs. Rob Van Dam	—N/a	
September 13	9/11 Tribute	Compaq Center	Houston, Texas	The Rock and Chris Jericho vs. "Stone Cold" Steve Austin and Kurt Angle	3.6	After the September 11 attacks, the WWF initially cancelled a SmackDown! taping on September 11 but chose to proceed with a live broadcast. It served as a tribute to the victims.
November 22	SmackDown! Thanksgiving	Crown Coliseum	Fayetteville, North Carolina	The Rock and Rob Van Dam vs. Chris Jericho and The Dudley Boyz (Bubba Ray Dudley and D-Von Dudley) in a 3-on-2 Handicap match	—N/a	Taped November 20; Featured the return of Jerry "The King" Lawler
December 27	SmackDown! Happy Holidays	TD Waterhouse Center	Orlando, Florida	"Stone Cold" Steve Austin vs. Booker T and Big Boss Man in a 2-on-1 Handicap match	—N/a	Taped on December 22

=== 2002 ===
Date	Episode	Venue	Location	Final match	Rating (millions)	Notes
January 3	New Year's SmackDown!	MCI Center	Washington, D.C.	The Rock vs. Booker T to determine the #1 contender for the Undisputed WWF Championship	—N/a	
July 4	Independence Day SmackDown!	Fleet Center	Boston, Massachusetts	The Undertaker (c) vs. Kurt Angle for the Undisputed WWF Championship	—N/a	Taped on July 2
September 12	SmackDown! 2002–03 Season Premiere	Target Center	Minneapolis, Minnesota	The Undertaker vs. Matt Hardy	—N/a	Taped on September 10; Featured Billy and Chuck's same-sex commitment ceremony
October 31	Halloween SmackDown!	Van Andel Arena	Grand Rapids, Michigan	Brock Lesnar vs. Rey Mysterio	—N/a	Taped on October 29
November 28	Thanksgiving SmackDown!	Carolina Center	Columbia, South Carolina	Big Show (c) vs. The Fabulous Moolah for the WWE Championship	—N/a	Taped on November 26
December 26	SmackDown! Happy Holidays	Tulsa Convention Center	Tulsa, Oklahoma	Chris Benoit vs. Big Show to determine the #1 contender for the WWE Championship	—N/a	Taped on December 22

=== 2003 ===
Date	Episode	Venue	Location	Final match	Rating (millions)	Notes
January 2	New Year's SmackDown!	Tingley Coliseum	Albuquerque, New Mexico	Brock Lesnar vs. Matt Hardy	—N/a	
September 25	SmackDown! 2003–04 Season Premiere	Wachovia Center	Philadelphia, Pennsylvania	Eddie Guerrero (c) vs. Charlie Haas for the WWE United States Championship	—N/a	Taped on September 23
November 27	SmackDown! Thanksgiving	BSU Pavillion	Boise, Idaho	20-man Battle Royal to determine the #1 contender for the WWE Championship	—N/a	Taped on November 25
December 25	Tribute to the Troops: Christmas from Baghdad	Camp Victory	Baghdad, Iraq	John Cena vs. Big Show	3.0	Taped on December 20; In honor of the United States Armed Forces

=== 2004 ===
Date	Episode	Venue	Location	Final match	Rating (millions)	Notes
January 1	New Year's SmackDown!	Laredo Entertainment Center	Laredo, Texas	The World's Greatest Tag Team (Shelton Benjamin and Charlie Haas) vs. Los Guerreros (Eddie Guerrero and Chavo Guerrero)	—N/a	Taped on December 30, 2003
September 23	SmackDown! 5th Anniversary	America West Arena	Phoenix, Arizona	Eddie Guerrero and Big Show vs. Kurt Angle and Luther Reigns	3.2	SmackDown! 2004–05 season premiere; Taped on September 21
October 14	SmackDown in England	Manchester Evening News Arena	Manchester, England	Eddie Guerrero vs. Luther Reigns	—N/a	The 1st SmackDown! episode held in England.; Taped on October 12
November 25	Thanksgiving SmackDown!	Blue Cross Arena	Rochester, New York	Eddie Guerrero and Booker T vs. John "Bradshaw" Layfield and Orlando Jordan	—N/a	Taped on November 23
December 23	Tribute to the Troops: Christmas in Iraq	Camp Speicher	Tikrit, Iraq	Eddie Guerrero and Rey Mysterio vs. Kurt Angle and Luther Reigns	2.9	Taped on December 18
December 30	SmackDown! Night of Champions	Lakefront Arena	New Orleans, Louisiana	Rey Mysterio and Rob Van Dam (c) vs. Eddie Guerrero and Booker T for the WWE Tag Team Championship	3.9	Taped on December 28; Featured championship matches

=== 2005 ===
Date	Episode	Venue	Location	Final match	Rating (millions)	Notes
January 6	New Year's SmackDown!	Mohegan Sun Arena	Uncasville, Connecticut	The Undertaker vs. Heidenreich and Paul Heyman in a 2-on-1 Handicap match	—N/a	Taped on January 4
February 10	SmackDown! Live in Japan	Saitama Super Arena	Saitama, Japan	Kurt Angle vs. Rey Mysterio in the 1st Round of the WWE Championship #1 Contender's Tournament	3.7	1st SmackDown! episode held in Japan; Taped on February 5.
May 19	SmackDown! 300	Tyson Events Center	Sioux City, Iowa	John Cena vs. The Basham Brothers (Danny Basham and Doug Basham) in a 2-on-1 Handicap match	—N/a	300th SmackDown! episode; Taped on May 17
June 9	WWE Draft	Kemper Arena	Kansas City, Missouri	Chris Benoit vs. John "Bradshaw" Layfield	—N/a	Night 2 of the WWE Draft; Taped on June 7
June 16	WWE Draft	GIANT Center	Hershey, Pennsylvania	The Undertaker vs. John "Bradshaw" Layfield in a No Disqualification match	—N/a	Night 4 of the WWE Draft; June 14
June 23	WWE Draft	Tucson Convention Center	Tucson, Arizona	Eddie Guerrero vs. Rey Mysterio	—N/a	Night 6 of the WWE Draft; June 21
June 30	WWE Draft	Arrowhead Pond	Anaheim, California	Booker T vs. Chris Benoit vs. Christian vs. John "Bradshaw" Layfield vs. Muhammad Hassan vs. The Undertaker in a Six-man elimination match to determine the #1 contender for the World Heavyweight Championship	—N/a	Last night of the WWE Draft; June 28
September 1	SmackDown!'s Last Thursday Episode	Jacksonville Veterans Memorial Arena	Jacksonville, Florida	Rey Mysterio vs. Randy Orton	—N/a	Taped on August 30
September 9	SmackDown! On Friday Nights	Gwinnett Center	Atlanta, Georgia	Batista vs John "Bradshaw" Layfield in a Bullrope match for the World Heavyweight Championship	—N/a	SmackDown! 2005–2006 season premiere; Taped on September 6
November 18	Eddie Guerrero Tribute	Target Center	Minneapolis, Minnesota	Chris Benoit vs. Triple H	3.3	In honor of Eddie Guerrero who died the previous weekend
November 25	SmackDown! Thanksgiving	Hallam FM Arena	Sheffield, England	Batista vs Randy Orton for the World Heavyweight Championship	—N/a	Taped on November 22
November 29	WWE SmackDown! Special	US Bank Arena	Cincinnati, Ohio	Rey Mysterio vs. Big Show	2.35	1-hour episode that aired live on a Tuesday
December 23	Best of 2005	Titan Towers	Stamford, Connecticut	—N/a	2.8	Recap episode
December 30	New Year's Eve SmackDown!	Mohegan Sun Arena	Uncasville, Connecticut	Dave Bautista and Rey Mysterio (c) vs. MNM (Johnny Nitro and Joey Mercury) for the WWE Tag Team Championship	—N/a	Taped on December 27

=== 2006 ===
Date	Episode	Venue	Location	Final match	Rating (millions)	Notes
January 6	New Year's SmackDown!	Wachovia Arena at Casey Plaza	Wilkes-Barre, Pennsylvania	MNM (Joey Mercury and Johnny Nitro) (c) vs. Batista and Rey Mysterio for the WWE Tag Team Championship	—N/a	Taped on January 3
September 22	SmackDown! CW 2006–07 Season Premiere	Bell Centre	Montreal, Quebec, Canada	The Undertaker vs. King Booker	2.4	After the founding of The CW, SmackDown! premiered on The CW; Taped on September 18
November 24	SmackDown! Thanksgiving	Nassau Coliseum	Long Island, New York	The Boogeyman vs. The Miz	—N/a	Taped on November 21
December 29	Best of 2006	Titan Towers	Stamford, Connecticut	—N/a	2.6	Recap episode

=== 2007 ===
Date	Episode	Venue	Location	Final match	Rating (millions)	Notes
January 5	New Year's SmackDown!	Jenkins Arena	Lakeland, Florida	Chris Benoit vs. Mr. Kennedy in a SmackDown! Sprint match	—N/a	Taped on January 2
April 20	SmackDown! 400	DatchForum	Milan, Italy	The Undertaker vs. Mr. Kennedy	2.5	The 400th SmackDown! episode; Taped on April 17
September 21	SmackDown! 2007–08 Season Premiere	Philips Arena	Atlanta, Georgia	Batista vs. Mark Henry	2.7	Taped on September 18
November 23	SmackDown! Thanksgiving	St. Pete's Times Forum	Tampa, Florida	Torrie Wilson vs. Victoria	—N/a	Taped on November 20
December 29	The Greatest Matches of 2007	WWE Headquarters	Stamford, Connecticut	—N/a	2.5	Recap episode

=== 2008 ===
Date	Episode	Venue	Location	Final match	Rating (millions)	Notes
January 4	New Year's Day SmackDown!	Richmond Coliseum	Richmond, Virginia	Edge vs. Rey Mysterio in a Beat the Clock Challenge	—N/a	Taped on December 30, 2007
January 25	SmackDown HD	John Paul Jones Arena	Charlottesville, Virginia	Edge vs. CM Punk	—N/a	The 1st SmackDown episode in HD; Taped on January 22
July 4	SmackDown 4th Of July Special	Tulsa Convention Center	Tulsa, Oklahoma	Matt Hardy (c) vs. Chavo Guerrero vs. Mr. Kennedy vs. Shelton Benjamin in a Fatal 4-way match for the WWE United States Championship	—N/a	Taped on July 1
October 3	All-Star Kickoff	Resch Center	Green Bay, Wisconsin	Chris Jericho vs. Matt Hardy vs. Triple H in a Triple Threat match	2.9	Premiere on MyNetworkTV; Featured Champion vs. Champion matches; Taped September 30
November 28	SmackDown Thanksgiving	Times Union Center	Albany, New York	Triple H vs. Shelton Benjamin in a Beat the Clock Challenge	—N/a	Taped on November 25
December 26	SmackDown Happy Holidays	Air Canada Centre	Toronto, Ontario, Canada	Big Show vs. Jeff Hardy	—N/a	Taped on December 22

=== 2009 ===
Date	Episode	Venue	Location	Final match	Rating (millions)	Notes
January 2	New Year's Day SmackDown	IZOD Center	East Rutherford, New Jersey	The Hardys (Jeff Hardy and Matt Hardy) vs. Edge and Big Show	—N/a	Taped on December 30, 2008
March 20	SmackDown 500	American Bank Center	Corpus Christi, Texas	The Undertaker vs. John "Bradshaw" Layfield	2.7	The 500th SmackDown episode; Multi-brand episode with Raw and ECW; Taped on March 17
October 2	A Decade of SmackDown	TD Garden	Boston, Massachusetts	D-Generation X (Shawn Michaels and Triple H), John Cena, and The Undertaker vs. CM Punk and Legacy (Randy Orton, Cody Rhodes, and Ted DiBiase)	3.77/2.20 share	SmackDown's 10th anniversary; Multi-brand episode with Raw and ECW; 2009–10 season premiere; Taped on September 29
November 27	SmackDown Thanksgiving	Arena At Harbor Yard	Bridgeport, Connecticut	The Undertaker vs. Chris Jericho	—N/a	Taped on November 24
December 25	Christmas SmackDown	Amway Arena	Orlando, Florida	D-Generation X (Shawn Michaels and Triple H) (c) vs. The Hart Dynasty (David Hart Smith and Tyson Kidd) for the Unified WWE Tag Team Championship	—N/a	Taped on December 20

== 2010s ==
=== 2010 ===
Date	Episode	Venue	Location	Final match	Rating (millions)	Notes
January 1	New Year's Day SmackDown	IZOD Center	East Rutherford, New Jersey	Batista vs. R-Truth in a Beat the Clock Challenge	—N/a	Taped on December 29, 2009
October 1	SmackDown Live Syfy Premiere	Chesapeake Energy Arena	Oklahoma City, Oklahoma	John Cena vs. Kane in a Lumberjack match	1.7	Multi-brand episode with SmackDown
November 26	SmackDown Thanksgiving	Jacksonville Veterans Memorial Arena	Jacksonville, Florida	Cody Rhodes vs. Rey Mysterio in a qualifying match for the King of the Ring Tournament	—N/a	Taped on November 23
December 21	Christmas on USA	AT&T Center	San Antonio, Texas	John Cena vs. Dolph Ziggler and Vickie Guerrero in a 2-on-1 Handicap match	2.5	Aired live on a Tuesday on USA
December 31	New Year's Eve SmackDown	Blue Cross Arena	Rochester, New York	Dolph Ziggler (c) vs. Jack Swagger vs. Kofi Kingston in a Triple Threat match for the WWE Intercontinental Championship	—N/a	Taped on December 28

=== 2011 ===
Date	Episode	Venue	Location	Final match	Rating (millions)	Notes
January 7	New Year's Day SmackDown	Tucson Convention Center	Tucson, Arizona	Alberto Del Rio vs. Rey Mysterio in a 2-out-of-3 Falls match	—N/a	Taped on January 4
February 18	SmackDown 600	Valley View Casino Center	San Diego, California	Dolph Ziggler (c) vs. Edge for the World Heavyweight Championship	2.1	The 600th SmackDown episode; Multi-brand episode with Raw; Taped on February 15
August 30	SuperSmackDown Live	Intrust Bank Arena	Wichita, Kansas	Randy Orton (c) vs. Christian in a Steel Cage match for the World Heavyweight Championship	—N/a	
September 16	Edge Appreciation Night	Air Canada Centre	Toronto, Ontario, Canada	Evan Bourne vs. R-Truth	—N/a	In honor of Edge in his hometown of Toronto; Taped on September 13
October 14	SmackDown Milestone	American Airlines Center	Dallas, Texas	Mark Henry (c) vs. Randy Orton for the World Heavyweight Championship	2.2	SmackDown became the 2nd-longest running weekly episodic TV show; Taped on October 11
November 29	SuperSmackDown Live Christmas Special	Time Warner Cable Arena	Charlotte, North Carolina	Mark Henry (c) vs. Daniel Bryan in a Steel Cage match for the World Heavyweight Championship	3.7	Hosted by Mick Foley
December 30	New Year's Day SmackDown	Bankers Life Fieldhouse	Indianapolis, Indiana	Randy Orton vs. Wade Barrett in a Falls Count Anywhere match	5.1	Taped on December 27

=== 2012 ===
Date	Episode	Venue	Location	Final match	Rating (millions)	Notes
January 6	New Year's Day SmackDown	Verizon Arena	North Little Rock, Arkansas	Daniel Bryan (c) vs. Big Show for the World Heavyweight Championship	Taped on January 3	
January 20	Sin City SmackDown	Thomas & Mack Center	Las Vegas, Nevada	Daniel Bryan (c) vs. Mark Henry in a Lumberjack match for the World Heavyweight Championship	3.7	Match stipulations were determined via a wheel spin; Taped on January 17
February 21	Tuesday Night SmackDown	Harris Bank Center	Rockford, Illinois|	CM Punk vs. Daniel Bryan	—N/a	Aired live on a Tuesday
April 10	SuperSmackDown Live: Blast from the Past	Hampton Coliseum	Hampton, Virginia	Alberto Del Rio and Daniel Bryan vs. Sheamus and Gene Okerlund	1.5	Special appearances by WWE legends
July 3	SuperSmackDown Live: The Great American Bash	American Bank Center	Corpus Christi, Texas	The Great American Bash 20-Man Battle Royal; Winner gets to be SmackDown's acting general manager for one night	1.7	Aired on a Tuesday
July 13	Friday Night ZackDown	Pepsi Center	Denver, Colorado	Chris Jericho vs. Sheamus	2.50/0.8 share	Zack Ryder served as the acting general manager; Taped on July 9
November 6	SuperSmackDown Live	Birmingham LG Arena	Birmingham, England	Randy Orton vs. Alberto Del Rio in a Falls Count Anywhere match	—N/a	
December 18	SuperSmackDown Live	Consol Energy Center	Pittsburgh, Pennsylvania	John Cena and Sheamus vs. Dolph Ziggler and Big Show	6.17	A commercial-free episode
December 28	New Year's Eve SmackDown	Blue Cross Arena	Rochester, New York	Big Show (c) vs. Alberto Del Rio for the World Heavyweight Championship	—N/a	Taped on December 19

=== 2013 ===
Date	Episode	Venue	Location	Final match	Rating (millions)	Notes
January 4	New Year's Day SmackDown	Richmond Coliseum	Richmond, Virginia	Randy Orton and Sheamus vs. Big Show and Antonio Cesaro	Taped on December 30, 2012	
January 11	The Rock's Return	American Airlines Arena	Miami, Florida	Big Show (c) vs. Alberto Del Rio in a Last Man Standing match for the World Heavyweight Championship	3.7	1st SmackDown appearance by The Rock in 10 years; Taped on January 8
January 19	SmackDown 700	AT&T Center	San Antonio, Texas	Dolph Ziggler and Big Show vs. Alberto Del Rio and Sheamus	2.88/0.8 share	The 700th SmackDown episode; Taped on January 15
March 1	Social Media SmackDown	Chesapeake Energy Arena	Oklahoma City, Oklahoma	Randy Orton vs. Big Show	4.1	Featured reactions from the wrestlers and fans on Tout, Twitter, and Facebook; Taped on February 26
November 29	Thanksgiving SmackDown	Mohegan Sun Arena	Uncasville, Connecticut	Cody Rhodes, Goldust, CM Punk, The Usos (Jey Uso and Jimmy Uso), and Rey Mysterio vs. The Shield (Seth Rollins, Roman Reigns, and Dean Ambrose) and The Wyatt Family (Bray Wyatt, Luke Harper, and Erick Rowan)	2.64/0.8 share	Taped on November 26
December 27	New Year's Eve SmackDown	American Bank Center	Corpus Christi, Texas	John Cena vs. Seth Rollins	—N/a	Taped on December 19

=== 2014 ===
Date	Episode	Venue	Location	Final match	Rating (millions)	Notes
January 3	New Year's Day SmackDown	MCI Center	Washington, D.C.	CM Punk and The Usos (Jey Uso and Jimmy Uso) vs. The Shield (Dean Ambrose, Roman Reigns, and Seth Rollins)	—N/a	Taped on December 29, 2013
October 10	SmackDown 15	Wells Fargo Center	Philadelphia, Pennsylvania	Team Teddy (Sheamus, Mark Henry, Jack Swagger, The Usos (Jey Uso and Jimmy Uso), and Los Matadores (Diego, Fernando, and El Torito)) vs. Team Johnny (Cesaro, Goldust, Stardust, Bo Dallas, Damien Mizdow, Heath Slater, Titus O'Neil, and Hornswoggle)	2.67/0.8 share	SmackDown's 15th anniversary; Taped on October 7
October 31	SmackDown Halloween Special	Toyota Center	Houston, Texas	Cesaro vs. Dean Ambrose in a Street Fight	2.21/0.6 share	Taped on October 28
November 28	Daniel Bryan SmackDown	Allen County War Memorial Coliseum	Fort Wayne, Indiana	Luke Harper (c) vs. Dolph Ziggler for the WWE Intercontinental Championship	—N/a	Taped on November 25
December 16	SuperSmackDown Live 800	Van Andel Arena	Grand Rapids, Michigan	Dolph Ziggler vs. Seth Rollins	2.03/1.51 share	The 800th SmackDown episode; Aired on USA
December 26	New Year's Eve SmackDown	Tyson Events Center	Sioux City, Iowa	Roman Reigns and Dolph Ziggler vs. Seth Rollins and Big Show	—N/a	Taped on December 21

=== 2015 ===
Date	Episode	Venue	Location	Final match	Rating (millions)	Notes
January 2	New Year's Day SmackDown	Norfolk Scope	Norfolk, Virginia	Roman Reigns vs Rusev	—N/a	Taped on December 30, 2014
January 9	Final Friday Night SmackDown	Laredo Energy Arena	Laredo, Texas	Roman Reigns and Dean Ambrose vs. Seth Rollins and Big Show	2.43/0.7 share	Taped on January 6
January 15	Thursday Night SmackDown	Baton Rouge River Center	Baton Rouge, Louisiana	Daniel Bryan, Roman Reigns, and Dean Ambrose vs. The Authority (Seth Rollins, Kane, and Big Show)	2.68/0.8 share	1st SmackDown episode to air on Thursday nights since the pilot episode on April 29, 1999; Taped on January 13
January 29	SmackDown Live	XL Center	Hartford, Connecticut	Daniel Bryan vs. Kane in a Casket match	2.95/0.9 share	Due to a blizzard, WWE postponed a live Raw episode in Hartford and a SmackDown taping in Boston. Raw became a recap show and the live Raw was rescheduled as a live SmackDown episode.
October 29	SmackDown Halloween	Talking Stick Resort Arena	Phoenix, Arizona	The Wyatt Family (Luke Harper, Erick Rowan, and Braun Strowman) vs. Dean Ambrose, Ryback, and Cesaro	2.1/1.7 share	Taped on October 27
November 26	Thanksgiving SmackDown	Bankers Life Fieldhouse	Indianapolis, Indiana	Dean Ambrose vs. Dolph Ziggler vs. Tyler Breeze in a Triple Threat match to determine the #1 contender for the WWE Intercontinental Championship	1.3/2.0 share	Taped on November 24
December 22	SuperSmackDown Live Christmas Special	Wells Fargo Arena	Des Moines, Iowa	Dean Ambrose (c) vs. Dolph Ziggler vs. Kevin Owens in a Triple Threat match for the WWE Intercontinental Championship	1.53	Aired on USA
December 31	Final SmackDown on Syfy	Verizon Center	Washington, D.C.	Roman Reigns and Dean Ambrose vs. Sheamus and Kevin Owens	2.8	Taped on December 29

=== 2016 ===
Date	Episode	Venue	Location	Final match	Rating (millions)	Notes
January 7	SmackDown USA Network Debut	Laredo Energy Arena	Laredo, Texas	Dean Ambrose vs. Kevin Owens for the WWE Intercontinental Championship	2.75	SmackDown debuts on the USA Network.
July 14	Final Thursday Night SmackDown 2016	Van Andel Arena	Grand Rapids, Michigan	Dean Ambrose and Sami Zayn vs. Seth Rollins and Kevin Owens	2.06/0.6 share	Final episode of SmackDown airing on Thursday Nights, on USA Network
July 19	2016 WWE Draft and SmackDown Live Premiere	DCU Center	Worcester, Massachusetts	Dean Ambrose (c) vs. Seth Rollins for the WWE Championship	3.17/1.2 share	SmackDown moves to Tuesday nights, renamed as SmackDown Live, airing live and marks the return of the Brand Extension and supplemental draft. This is also the first WWE Draft to air on SmackDown
November 15	SmackDown Live's 900th Episode	Mohegan Sun Arena at Casey Plaza	Wilkes-Barre, Pennsylvania	The Usos (Jey Uso and Jimmy Uso), The Hype Bros (Zack Ryder and Mojo Rawley), American Alpha (Jason Jordan and Chad Gable) and Breezango (Tyler Breeze and Fandango) vs. The Spirit Squad (Kenny and Mikey), The Vaudevillains (Simon Gotch and Aiden English), The Ascension (Konnor and Viktor), and The Headbangers (Mosh and Thrasher)	2.75	Celebrated the 900th episode of SmackDown. Featured the return of The Undertaker and Edge on "The Cutting Edge"
December 27	SmackDown Live's Wild Card Finals	Allstate Arena	Rosemont, Illinois	AJ Styles (c) vs. Dolph Ziggler vs. Baron Corbin in a Triple Threat Match for the WWE Championship	2.89	Celebrating the final episode of SmackDown in 2016. Featured three championship matches and the return of John Cena

=== 2017 ===
Date	Episode	Venue	Location	Final match	Rating (millions)	Notes
January 3	SmackDown New Year's Day	Jacksonville Veterans Memorial Arena	Jacksonville, Florida	The Miz (c) vs. Dean Ambrose for the WWE Intercontinental Championship	—N/a	The first SmackDown of 2017
April 11	2017 WWE Superstar Shake-up	TD Garden	Boston, Massachusetts	AJ Styles vs. Baron Corbin vs. Sami Zayn in a Triple Threat Match to determine the #1 Contender for the WWE United States Championship	2.14	Ten performers, including nine from the Raw brand, are announced as moving to SmackDown.
September 12	Sin City SmackDown Live	Thomas & Mack Center	Las Vegas, Nevada	Chad Gable and Shelton Benjamin vs. The Hype Bros (Zack Ryder and Mojo Rawley)	2.7	A special episode of SmackDown Live emanating from Las Vegas, Nevada. Featured three championship matches and Kevin Owens' attack on Mr. McMahon.
November 14	Monday Night Raw invades SmackDown Live	Spectrum Center	Charlotte, North Carolina	The New Day (Big E and Kofi Kingston) vs. Kevin Owens and Sami Zayn	2.60	A special episode of SmackDown Live in which the roster from Monday Night Raw (led by Kurt Angle), invaded SmackDown during the main event (featuring The Shield triple powerbombing Shane McMahon); Episode also featured a special appearance by Ric Flair and the return of Daniel Bryan.
December 26	SmackDown Live Christmas	Allstate Arena	Rosemont, Illinois	AJ Styles vs. Kevin Owens	2.6	Live Christmas-themed episode of SmackDown on Christmas Tuesday, held at the Allstate Arena

=== 2018 ===
Date	Episode	Venue	Location	Final match	Rating (millions)	Notes
January 2	SmackDown Live New Year's Day	Orlando, Florida	Amway Center	AJ Styles vs. Sami Zayn	2.7	Live episode of SmackDown on the first Tuesday of 2018, held at the Amway Center
April 17	Superstar Shake-up	Providence, Rhode Island	Dunkin' Donuts Center	AJ Styles and Daniel Bryan vs. Rusev and Aiden English	2.7	Ten performers, including eight from the Raw brand and two from NXT, are announced as moving to SmackDown.
October 16	SmackDown 1000	Washington, D.C.	Capital One Arena	Rey Mysterio vs. Shinsuke Nakamura in a WWE World Cup Qualifying Match	2.5	Celebrating the show's historic 1000th episode. Featuring the return of The McMahon family (Stephanie McMahon, Shane McMahon, and Vince McMahon), Evolution (Triple H, Ric Flair, Batista, and Randy Orton), Edge on "The Cutting Edge", The Undertaker, Rey Mysterio, and many WWE Legends
November 20	SmackDown Thanksgiving	Los Angeles, California	Staples Center	Rey Mysterio vs. Randy Orton	—N/a	Special Thanksgiving themed episode of SmackDown
December 25	Christmas Day SmackDown	Save Mart Center	Fresno, California	Shinsuke Nakamura (c) vs. Rusev for the WWE United States Championship	1.9	Christmas Day edition of SmackDown taped on December 18, 2018

=== 2019 ===
Date	Episode	Venue	Location	Final match	Rating (millions)	Notes
January 1	New Year's SmackDown	PPG Paints Arena	Pittsburgh, Pennsylvania	AJ Styles vs. Mustafa Ali vs. Randy Orton vs. Rey Mysterio vs. Samoa Joe in a Fatal 5-Way to determine the #1 Contender for the WWE Championship	2.0	New Year's Day edition of SmackDown taped on December 29, 2018
April 16	Superstar Shake-up	Bell Centre	Montreal, Quebec, Canada	Kevin Owens and The New Day (Kofi Kingston and Xavier Woods) vs. Cesaro, Shinsuke Nakamura, and Rusev	2.22	Thirteen performers, including one from 205 Live, two from NXT, and the remainder from Raw, are announced as moving to SmackDown.
September 10	Return to Madison Square Garden	Madison Square Garden	New York, New York	Chad Gable vs. Shane McMahon in a Two-out-of-three fallssemifinals of the King of the Ring tournament with special guest referee Kevin Owens	2.06	The second program of a two-night residence at MSG, marking WWE's first television broadcasts from the arena in 10 years. Featured an appearance by The Undertaker.
September 24	Final SmackDown on USA Network	Chase Center	San Francisco, California	The Kabuki Warriors (Asuka and Kairi Sane) vs. Mandy Rose and Sonya Deville	2.09	Final episode of SmackDown airing on Tuesday nights and on USA Network.
September 27	SmackDown's Greatest Hits				1.39	A clip show featuring highlights of noted moments from the 20-year history of SmackDown. It marked the first WWE program to air on Fox, and served as a prelude for the premiere of SmackDown on Fox the following week.
October 4	SmackDown's 20th Anniversary	Staples Center	Los Angeles, California	Kofi Kingston (c) vs. Brock Lesnar for the WWE Championship	3.89	First episode on Fox, returning to Friday nights and renamed as Friday Night SmackDown; the episode would also formally mark the show's 20th anniversary. SmackDown 2019–2020 season premiere. Featuring an appearance by Tyson Fury, Cain Velasquez, and the return of The Rock.
October 11	2019 WWE Draft	T-Mobile Arena	Las Vegas, Nevada	Charlotte Flair (c) vs. Bayley for the WWE SmackDown Women's Championship	2.89	The first night of a two-night draft between Raw and SmackDown.
November 1	NXT Invasion	KeyBank Center	Buffalo, New York	Adam Cole (c) vs. Daniel Bryan for the NXT Championship	2.54	Due to travel delays returning from Crown Jewel in Saudi Arabia, most of the SmackDown roster was absent, prompting an extensive focus on the brand's women's roster (including a SmackDown Women's Championship match), and the introduction of an NXT invasion angle (as a lead-up to Survivor Series), concluding with Daniel Bryan being defeated by Adam Cole to retain his NXT Championship.
November 29	SmackDown Thanksgiving	Birmingham Jefferson Convention Complex Arena	Birmingham, Alabama	The New Day (Big E and Kofi Kingston) (c) vs. Cesaro and Shinsuke Nakamura for the WWE SmackDown Tag Team Championship	—N/a	Special Thanksgiving themed episode of SmackDown.
December 27	New Year's Eve SmackDown	Little Caesars Arena	Detroit, Michigan	Daniel Bryan vs. The Miz vs. King Corbin in a Triple Threat Match to determine the #1 Contender for the WWE Universal Championship	—N/a	The final SmackDown of 2019.

== 2020s ==
=== 2020 ===
Episode	Date	Location	Venue	Rating (millions)	Notes
SmackDown New Year's Day	January 3, 2020	Memphis, Tennessee	FedExForum	—N/a	The first SmackDown of 2020.
Super SmackDown	January 31, 2020	Tulsa, Oklahoma	BOK Center	—N/a	Special Live episode of Super SmackDown.
John Cena Appreciation Night	February 28, 2020	Boston, Massachusetts	TD Garden	2.69	Special episode showing highlights of John Cena's career and featured his return.
Triple H 25th Anniversary Show	April 24, 2020	Orlando, Florida	WWE Performance Center	2.17	Special episode paying tribute 25 years of Triple H's WWE career. This episode was originally scheduled to take place in Omaha, Nebraska, but was held behind closed doors at the WWE Performance Center after a slew of sporting-related cancellations that took place due to the COVID-19 pandemic.
Undertaker Tribute Show	June 26, 2020	Orlando, Florida	WWE Performance Center	2.17	Special episode paying tribute to The Undertaker's 30 year WWE career.
SmackDown 1100	September 18, 2020	Orlando, Florida	Amway Center		Celebrates the show's historic 1100th episode.
2020 WWE Draft	October 9, 2020	Orlando, Florida	Amway Center	2.18	The first night of a two-night draft between Raw and SmackDown.
Friday Night SmackDown Season 2 Premiere	October 16, 2020	Orlando, Florida	Amway Center	2.12	Special episode celebrating a year of SmackDown on Fox.
Christmas Day SmackDown 2020	December 25, 2020	St. Petersburg, Florida	Tropicana Field	3.30	Christmas Day edition of Friday Night SmackDown.

=== 2021 ===
Episode	Date	Location	Venue	Rating (millions)	Notes
New Year's SmackDown 2021	January 1, 2021	St. Petersburg, Florida	Tropicana Field	2.01	New Year's episode of Friday Night SmackDown.
WrestleMania SmackDown	April 9, 2021	St. Petersburg, Florida	Tropicana Field	2.25	Special WrestleMania 37-themed episode (taped April 2, 2021), featuring the André the Giant Memorial Battle Royal and a match for the SmackDown Tag Team Championship.
Throwback SmackDown	May 7, 2021	Tampa, Florida	Yuengling Center	2.28	Old school-themed episode, as part of Fox Sports "throwback week" promotions for the 2021 Goodyear 400 NASCAR race the following Sunday,
Return to Live Crowds	July 16, 2021	Houston, Texas	Toyota Center	2.31	First SmackDown held live with fans since March 6, 2020 due to the COVID-19 pandemic, marking WWE's resumption of live touring.
SmackDown at Rolling Loud 2021	July 23, 2021	Cleveland, Ohio Miami Gardens, Florida	Rocket Mortgage FieldHouse Hard Rock Stadium	2.14	Two matches were broadcast from the Rolling Loud hip-hop music festival in Miami. The remainder of the show aired from the Rocket Mortgage FieldHouse.
Super SmackDown: Return to Madison Square Garden	September 10, 2021	New York, New York	Madison Square Garden	2.38	A special episode of SmackDown from the Garden with appearances from Brock Lesnar, John Cena, and the Raw roster.
2021 WWE Draft Night 1	October 1, 2021	Baltimore, Maryland	Royal Farms Arena	2.25	First night of the annual WWE Draft (the second night of which was the October 4 episode of Raw), where wrestlers are drafted between the Raw and SmackDown brands.
SmackDown 2021–2022 season premiere	October 8, 2021	San Jose, California	SAP Center	2.14	Featuring the first rounds of the 2021 King of the Ring and Queen's Crown tournaments.
Supersized SmackDown	October 15, 2021	Ontario, California	Toyota Arena	0.86	Special two-and-a-half-hour edition of SmackDown which featured an appearance from Brock Lesnar, as well as SmackDown Women's Champion Becky Lynch vs. Sasha Banks in a non-title match. Aired on FS1 due to the MLB playoffs airing on Fox.
Thanksgiving SmackDown	November 26, 2021	Greensboro, North Carolina	Greensboro Coliseum	2.15	Special Thanksgiving-themed episode of SmackDown
Christmas Eve SmackDown 2021	December 24, 2021	Rosemont, Illinois	Allstate Arena	1.96	Taped after the December 17, 2021 episode. Featured a "12 Days of Christmas gauntlet match" to determine the top contender for the WWE Intercontinental Championship.
Best of 2021	December 31, 2021			—N/a	A year-in-review episode, which aired on FS1 due to Fox's (cancelled) New Year's Eve programming. WWE initially announced plans to air a live SmackDown for New Year's Eve in Charlotte, but these plans were scrapped.

=== 2022 ===
Episode	Date	Location	Venue	Rating (millions)	Notes
New Year's SmackDown 2022	January 7, 2022	Uncasville, Connecticut	Mohegan Sun Arena	—N/a	The first SmackDown of 2022.
Brock Lesnar 20th Anniversary Show	March 18, 2022	Charlotte, North Carolina	Spectrum Center	2.043	Show aired on the 20th anniversary of Brock Lesnar's debut in WWE. Lesnar made an appearance during the episode.
WrestleMania 38 SmackDown	April 1, 2022	Dallas, Texas	American Airlines Center	2.229	Special WrestleMania 38-themed episode, featuring the André the Giant Memorial Battle Royal and a match for the WWE Intercontinental Championship.
SmackDown 1200	August 19, 2022	Montréal, Quebec, Canada	Bell Centre	2.084	Celebrates the show's historic 1200th episode.
SmackDown 2022–2023 season premiere	October 7, 2022	Worcester, Massachusetts	DCU Center	2.243	The fourth-season premiere of WWE SmackDown on Fox featured a face-to-face from Logan Paul & Roman Reigns as well as Triple H opening the show.
SmackDown Thanksgiving	November 25, 2022	Providence, Rhode Island	Amica Mutual Pavilion	—N/a	Special Thanksgiving themed episode of SmackDown.
SmackDown Merry Christmas	December 23, 2022	Rosemont, Illinois	Allstate Arena	2.376	Christmas-themed episode, taped after the December 16 episode of SmackDown.
New Year's SmackDown	December 30, 2022	Tampa, Florida	Amalie Arena	2.629	Final Friday Night SmackDown of 2022 featuring: John Cena and Kevin Owens vs. Roman Reigns and Sami Zayn in Cena's first match since August 2021

=== 2023 ===
#	Title	Significance	Dates		Venue	Location	Final match	Rating (millions)
#	Title	Significance	Taping	Airing	Venue	Location	Final match	Rating (millions)
1220	New Year's SmackDown	New Year's theme	January 6		FedExForum	Memphis, Tennessee	The Usos (Jey Uso and Jimmy Uso) (c) vs. Drew McIntyre and Sheamus for the Undisputed WWE Tag Team Championship	—N/a
1226	Elimination Chamber SmackDown	The SmackDown before Elimination Chamber	February 17		Bell Centre	Montreal, Quebec, Canada	Gunther (c) vs. Madcap Moss for the WWE Intercontinental Championship	2.383
1232	WrestleMania SmackDown	WrestleMania 39 theme	March 31		Crypto.com Arena	Los Angeles, California	Drew McIntyre and Sheamus vs. Imperium (Giovanni Vinci and Ludwig Kaiser)	2.373
1236	WWE Draft (Night 1)		April 28		American Bank Center	Corpus Christi, Texas	Kevin Owens and Sami Zayn (c) vs. The Usos (Jey Uso and Jimmy Uso) for the Undisputed WWE Tag Team Championship	2.473
1237	Backlash SmackDown	The SmackDown before Backlash	May 5		Coliseo de Puerto Rico José Miguel Agrelot	San Juan, Puerto Rico	Latino World Order (Rey Mysterio and Zelina Vega) vs. The Judgment Day (Dominik Mysterio and Rhea Ripley) in a Mixed tag team match	2.059
1245	Money in the Bank SmackDown	The SmackDown before Money in the Bank	June 30		O2 Arena	London, England	Asuka (c) vs. Charlotte Flair for the WWE Women's Championship	2.510
1252	SmackDown	Edge's 25-year debut anniversary Edge wrestled in his last WWE match.	August 18		Scotiabank Arena	Toronto, Ontario, Canada	Edge vs. Sheamus	2.094
1253	SmackDown	Tribute to Terry Funk and Bray Wyatt, who died on August 23 and 24, respectively.	August 25		KFC Yum! Center	Louisville, Kentucky	Finn Bálor vs. LA Knight	2.647
1260	SmackDown	The 2023–24 season premiere of SmackDown on Fox	October 13		BOK Center	Tulsa, Oklahoma	LA Knight vs. Solo Sikoa	2.417
1266	Survivor Series SmackDown	The SmackDown before Survivor Series	November 24		Allstate Arena	Rosemont, Illinois	Becky Lynch and Charlotte Flair vs. Damage CTRL (Asuka and Bayley)	0.789
1268	Tribute to the Troops	Tribute to the United States Armed Forces.	December 8		Amica Mutual Pavilion	Providence, Rhode Island	LA Knight and Randy Orton vs. The Bloodline (Jimmy Uso and Solo Sikoa)	2.384
1270	SmackDown	Christmas edition	December 15	December 22	Resch Center	Green Bay, Wisconsin	AJ Styles vs. Solo Sikoa	2.108
1271	The Absolute Best of 2023	Recap episode	December 29		WWE Headquarters	Stamford, Connecticut	—N/a	1.355

=== 2024 ===
#	Title	Significance	Dates	Venue	Location	Final match	Rating (millions)
1272	SmackDown New Year's Revolution	New Year's theme	January 5	Rogers Arena	Vancouver, British Columbia, Canada	AJ Styles vs. LA Knight vs. Randy Orton to determine the #1 contender for the Undisputed WWE Championship	2.465
1285	WrestleMania SmackDown	WrestleMania XL-theme	April 5	Wells Fargo Center	Philadelphia, Pennsylvania	Jey Uso vs. Solo Sikoa	2.600
1288	WWE Draft (Night 1)		April 26	Heritage Bank Center	Cincinnati, Ohio	Carmelo Hayes vs. Cody Rhodes	2.140
1289	SmackDown France	The SmackDown before Backlash France	May 3	LDLC Arena	Décines-Charpieu, Greater Lyon, France	A-Town Down Under (Austin Theory and Grayson Waller) (c) vs. The Street Profits (Angelo Dawkins and Montez Ford) for the WWE Tag Team Championship	2.148
1292	SmackDown King and Queen of the Ring	The SmackDown before King and Queen of the Ring	May 24	Jeddah Superdome	Jeddah, Saudi Arabia	Randy Orton vs. Tama Tonga in the semifinals of the King of the Ring Tournament	2.147
1295	SmackDown Clash at the Castle	The SmackDown before Clash at the Castle: Scotland	June 14	OVO Hydro	Glasgow, Scotland	Kevin Owens vs. Solo Sikoa	1.959
1298	SmackDown Money in the Bank	The SmackDown before Money in the Bank	July 5	Scotiabank Arena	Toronto, Ontario, Canada	A-Town Down Under (Austin Theory and Grayson Waller) (c) vs. #DIY (Johnny Gargano and Tommaso Ciampa) for the WWE Tag Team Championship	2.256
1300	SmackDown	1300th episode	July 19	CHI Health Center Omaha	Omaha, Nebraska	A-Town Down Under (Austin Theory and Grayson Waller) vs. Cody Rhodes and Kevin Owens	2.313
1302	SummerSlam SmackDown	The SmackDown before SummerSlam	August 2	Rocket Mortgage FieldHouse	Cleveland, Ohio	#DIY (Johnny Gargano and Tommaso Ciampa) (c) vs. The Bloodline (Jacob Fatu and Tama Tonga)	2.179
1306	Bash in Berlin SmackDown	The SmackDown before Bash in Berlin	August 30	Uber Arena	Berlin, Germany	Nia Jax (c) vs, Michin in a Street Fight for the WWE Women's Championship	2.054
1307	SmackDown's Fox finale	The last SmackDown on Fox	September 6	Rogers Place	Edmonton, Alberta, Canada	#DIY (Johnny Gargano and Tommaso Ciampa) and The Street Profits (Angelo Dawkins and Montez Ford) vs. The Bloodline (Solo Sikoa, Jacob Fatu, Tama Tonga, and Tonga Loa)	1.770
1308	SmackDown 25th Anniversary Show	SmackDown's return to USA The 2024–25 Season Premiere of SmackDown	September 13	Climate Pledge Arena	Seattle, Washington	Andrade vs. Carmelo Hayes to determine the #1 contender for the WWE United States Championship	1.723

=== 2025 ===
#	Title	Significance	Dates	Venue	Location	Final match	Rating (millions)
1324	SmackDown	SmackDown moved to a 3-hour runtime	January 3	Footprint Center	Phoenix, Arizona	The Bloodline (Solo Sikoa, Jacob Fatu, and Tama Tonga) vs. The OG Bloodline (Jey Uso, Jimmy Uso, and Sami Zayn)	1.528
1339	WrestleMania SmackDown	WrestleMania 41-theme The 1st hour was commercial-free.	April 18	T-Mobile Arena	Las Vegas, Nevada	American Made (Chad Gable, Brutus Creed, and Julius Creed) vs. Latino World Order (Rey Mysterio, Dragon Lee, and Rey Fenix)	—N/a

=== 2026 ===
#	Title	Significance	Date	Venue	Location	Final match	Rating (millions)
1376	Happy New Year SmackDown	New Year's edition SmackDown returned to a 3-hour runtime	January 2	KeyBank Center	Buffalo, New York	Aleister Black vs. Damian Priest in an Ambulance match	—N/a
1377	SmackDown: Berlin, Germany	The last hour of the 3-hour broadcast was commercial-free.	January 9	Uber Arena	Berlin, Germany	Drew McIntyre vs. Cody Rhodes (c) in a 3 Stages of Hell match for the Undisputed WWE Championship: 1st stage: Singles match; 2nd stage: Falls Count Anywhere match; 3rd stage: Steel Cage match	—N/a
1391	WrestleMania SmackDown	WrestleMania 42-theme	April 17	T-Mobile Arena	Paradise, Nevada	André the Giant Memorial Battle Royal	—N/a
1400	SmackDown	1400th episode	June 19	T-Mobile Center	Kansas City, Missouri	Liv Morgan vs. Charlotte Flair in the semifinals of the Queen of the Ring tournament.	—N/a
1420	Danhausen's Very Nice, Very Evil SmackDown	Halloween Special	October 30	Charleston Coliseum & Convention Center	Charleston, West Virginia	Sami Zayn (c) vs. Trick Williams for the Undisputed WWE Championship in a No Disqualification match	—N/a

== See also ==
- List of WWE Raw special episodes
- List of WWE NXT special episodes
