= WWE SmackDown debut episode =

Professional wrestling television special

WWE SmackDown Debut
- The Debut WWE SmackDown logo, used until August 9, 2001.
- Promotion: WWF
- Brand: SmackDown
- Date: August 24, 1999 (aired August 26, 1999)
- City: Kansas City, Missouri
- Venue: Kemper Arena

SmackDown special episodes chronology
← Previous first	Next → Thanksgiving SmackDown

The WWE SmackDown debut episode was a professional wrestling show that marked the debut of WWE's (then WWF) weekly WWF SmackDown! television show. The show took place on August 26, 1999. Although the episode marked the beginning of the series, an earlier pilot aired back on April 29.

The show aired live on UPN, taking place at Kemper Arena in Kansas City, Missouri, which was WWF's first event at the arena since the death of Owen Hart.

== Storylines ==
The event included matches that resulted from scripted storylines, where wrestlers portrayed heroes, villains, or less distinguishable characters in scripted events that built tension and culminated in a wrestling match or series of matches. Results were predetermined by WWE's writers.

== Event ==
The show opened with an opening promo by the newly crowned WWF Champion, Triple H, accompanied by Chyna. The Rock challenged him to a championship match to which he declined. Then WWF Commissioner Shawn Michaels made the match official, naming himself as the special guest referee. Shane McMahon entered to declare himself as the second guest referee, Michaels denied this and announces McMahon would be wrestling Mankind later in the night. A brawl ensued with The Rock and Mankind clearing the ring.

During the show ring announcer Howard Finkel entered the ring, using Ultimate Warrior's entrance theme. Finkel stole the microphone from announcer Tony Chimel, however Chimel tackled him to the floor, Chris Jericho helped him to his feet, and an ongoing skit throughout the show involving Finkel, Jericho and Ken Shamrock was seen throughout the night.

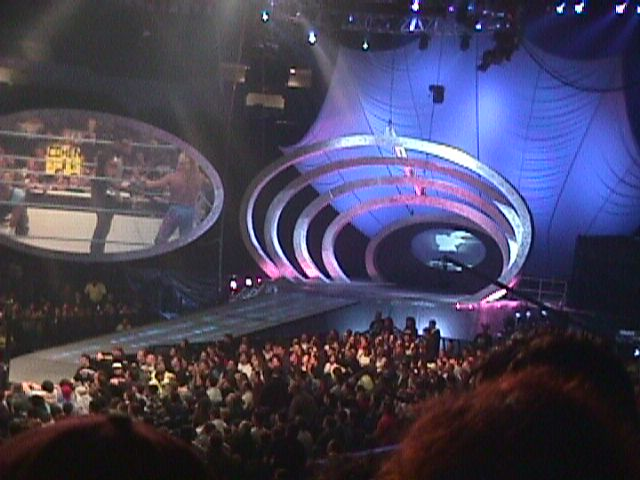
The official set used from the show's debut from August 26, 1999, until August 9, 2001

== Results ==
No.	Results	Stipulations
1	Kurt Angle defeated The California Kid	Dark match
2	Edge (w/ Christian) defeated Matt Hardy (w/ Jeff Hardy)	Dark match
3	D'Lo Brown defeated Hardcore Holly (w/ Crash Holly)	Dark match
4	Val Venis defeated Mark Henry	Dark match
5	Gangrel defeated Chaz (w/ Marianna)	Dark match
6	Mr. Ass defeated Jeff Jarrett (w/ Miss Kitty and Debra)	Singles match
7	The Unholy Alliance (The Undertaker and The Big Show) (c) (w/ Paul Bearer) defeated Kane and X-Pac and The APA (Bradshaw and Farooq)	Triple Threat match for the WWF Tag Team Championship
8	Big Boss Man defeated Al Snow (c)	Hardcore match for the WWF Hardcore Championship
9	Road Dogg defeated Chris Jericho by disqualification	Singles match
10	Shane McMahon defeated Mankind	Singles match
11	Tori defeated Ivory	Evening Gown match
12	Triple H (c) (w/ Chyna) defeated The Rock (w/ Shawn Michaels and Shane McMahon as the special guest referees)	Singles match for the WWF Championship
(c) / – the champion(s) heading into the match
