= Survivor Series: WarGames (2023) =

WWE premium live event

- Promotional poster featuring Cody Rhodes
- Promotion: WWE
- Brand(s): Raw; SmackDown
- Date: November 25, 2023
- City: Rosemont, Illinois
- Venue: Allstate Arena
- Attendance: 17,138

WWE event chronology
← Previous; Crown Jewel	Next → NXT Deadline

Survivor Series chronology
← Previous; 2022	Next → 2024

The 2023 Survivor Series: WarGames was a professional wrestling premium live event (PLE) produced by WWE, held for wrestlers from the promotion's main roster brands, Raw and SmackDown. It was the 37th annual Survivor Series, and the second annual branded as "WarGames", and it took place on Saturday, November 25, 2023, at the Allstate Arena in the Chicago suburb of Rosemont, Illinois. The event centered on the WarGames match, a type of roofless steel cage match that surrounds two rings placed side by side and is contested by teams of multiple wrestlers; the first team to score a pinfall or submission wins while escaping the cage is a forfeit.

Five matches were contested at the event, including two WarGames matches. In the main event, which was a men's WarGames match and was the main match from Raw, Cody Rhodes, Seth "Freakin" Rollins, Jey Uso, Sami Zayn, and Randy Orton defeated The Judgment Day (Damian Priest, Finn Bálor, "Dirty" Dominik Mysterio, and JD McDonagh) and Drew McIntyre, while in the women's WarGames match, which was the opening bout and was the main match from SmackDown, Bianca Belair, Charlotte Flair, Shotzi, and Raw's Becky Lynch defeated Damage CTRL (Bayley, Asuka, Iyo Sky, and Kairi Sane). The event also notably featured the returns of Randy Orton and R-Truth, both of whom had been out with injuries since May and November 2022, respectively, as well as the return of CM Punk in his first WWE appearance since the 2014 Royal Rumble (discounting FS1's WWE Backstage in 2019–20), after being terminated by All Elite Wrestling three months prior in August.

This was the third Survivor Series held at the Allstate Arena, after the 1989 event, when it was known as the Rosemont Horizon, and the 2019 event. It was also the fourth Survivor Series to not feature a traditional Survivor Series match, after the 1998, 2002, and 2022 events. This was also the first Survivor Series to livestream on Binge in Australia and Abema in Japan. This would also be WWE's final event to officially be distributed on DVD before WWE shut down its home video division at the end of the year.

== Production ==
=== Background ===
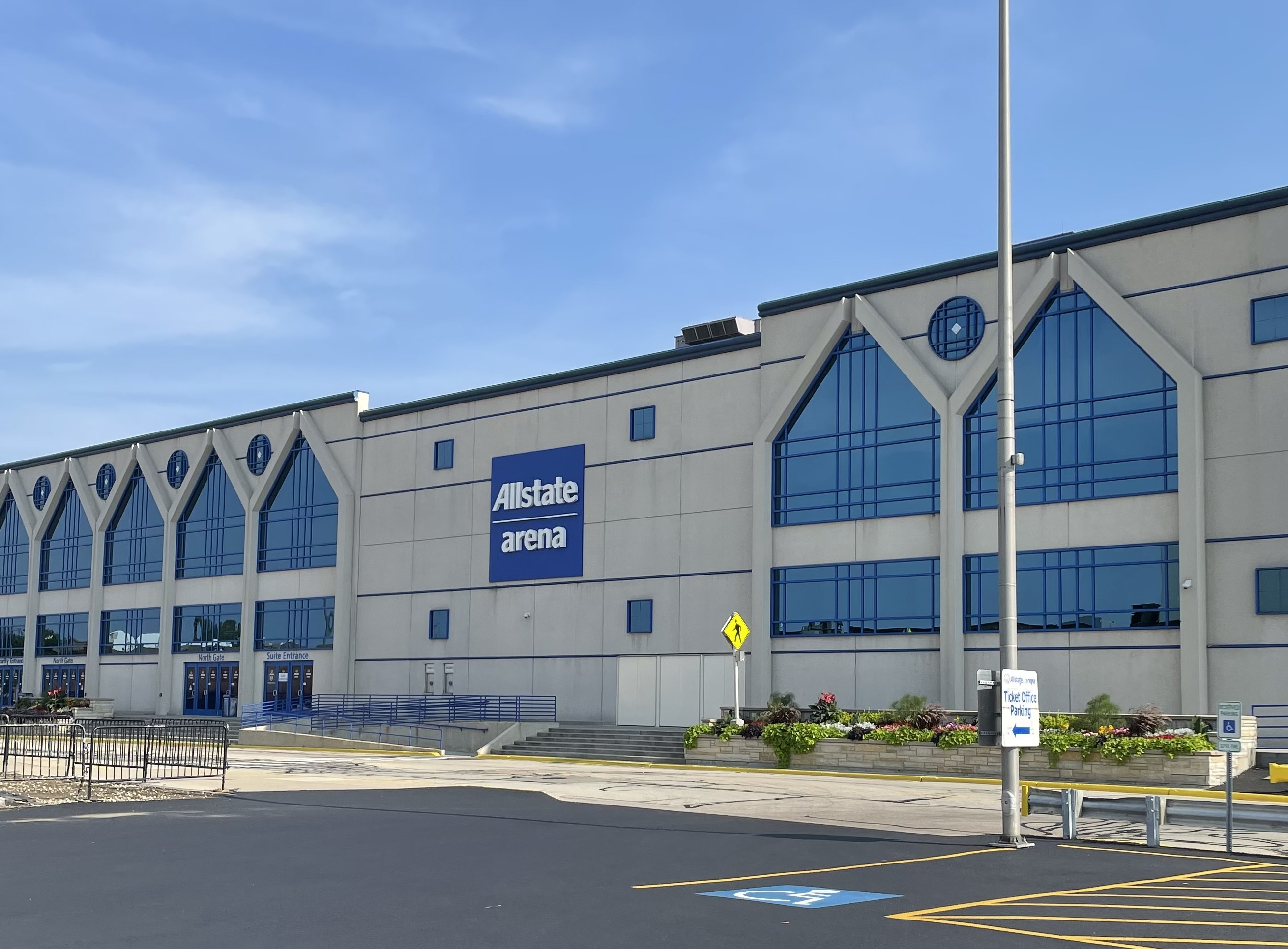
The 37th annual Survivor Series was the third time for the event to be held at the Allstate Arena in the Chicago suburb of Rosemont, Illinois, after the 1989 event, when it was known as the Rosemont Horizon, and the 2019 event.

Survivor Series is an annual professional wrestling premium live event (PLE) produced every November by WWE since 1987, generally held around Thanksgiving in the United States. It was originally broadcast exclusively via pay-per-view (PPV) before it began simulcasting on WWE's livestreaming platforms in 2014. In what has become the second longest-running PPV event in history (behind WWE's WrestleMania), it is one of the promotion's original four PPVs, along with WrestleMania, SummerSlam, and Royal Rumble, referred to as the "Big Four", and as of August 2021, it is considered one of the "Big Five", along with Money in the Bank.

From 1987 to 2021, the event was characterized by having Survivor Series matches, which were tag team elimination matches that typically featured teams of four or five wrestlers against each other. In a break from tradition, the 2022 event did not include any Survivor Series or elimination type matches and was instead based around the WarGames match with the event titled Survivor Series: WarGames. The WarGames match is a type of roofless steel cage match that surrounds two rings placed side by side. It is contested by two or three teams composed of three to six members each. One member from each team starts in the cage, and every couple of minutes, another team member enters in a staggered format until all participants have entered. Once all participants are in the cage, the match officially begins and the first team to score a pinfall or submission wins, while escaping the cage is a forfeit.

On July 7, 2023, WWE announced that it would be returning to the Allstate Arena in the Chicago suburb of Rosemont, Illinois for the 37th Survivor Series on Saturday, November 25, 2023. This was the third Survivor Series to be held at the arena, after the 1989 event when it was known as the Rosemont Horizon (renamed in 1999), and the 2019 event, and it featured wrestlers from the Raw and SmackDown brand divisions. Additionally, the November 24 episode of Friday Night SmackDown was held at the same arena. Tickets went on sale on July 21 via Ticketmaster. During Crown Jewel on November 4, it was announced that the 2023 event would retain the WarGames concept, thus marking the fourth Survivor Series to not feature a traditional Survivor Series match, after the 1998, 2002, and 2022 events. It also made the event the second time the Allstate Arena hosted an event centered around the WarGames match, after the 2019 NXT TakeOver: WarGames.

=== Broadcast outlets ===
Survivor Series was available through traditional PPV outlets worldwide. It was also available to livestream on Peacock in the United States, SonyLIV in India, Disney+ Hotstar in Indonesia, Disney+ in the Philippines, Binge in Australia, Abema in Japan, and the WWE Network everywhere else. It was the first Survivor Series to livestream on Binge and Abema, after those countries' respective versions of the WWE Network merged under those services in January and October, respectively.

=== Storylines ===
The event included five matches that resulted from scripted storylines. Results were predetermined by WWE's writers on the Raw and SmackDown brands, while storylines were produced on WWE's weekly television shows, Monday Night Raw and Friday Night SmackDown.

On the October 30 episode of Raw, Intercontinental Champion Gunther was supposed to be a guest on The Miz's talk show, "Miz TV"; however, Miz was interrupted by Gunther's Imperium stablemates Giovanni Vinci and Ludwig Kaiser, who stated that Gunther would not appear. After some arguing, however, Gunther came out and stated that he did not respect Miz, as he viewed Miz more as an "entertainer" than a serious wrestler, with Miz then saying that he himself was the one who had made the Intercontinental Championship prestigious and could do it again. After Imperium began to destroy the "Miz TV" set, Miz attacked Imperium, but Gunther got the upper hand, turning Miz face for the first time since January 2020. Later, Miz asked Raw General Manager Adam Pearce for a championship match against Gunther, but Pearce declined as there were others who also wanted a title match. A fatal four-way match was then scheduled for the next episode to determine Gunther's challenger for the Intercontinental Championship at Survivor Series: WarGames, which Miz won.

At Crown Jewel, Zoey Stark was part of a fatal five-way match for Rhea Ripley's Women's World Championship, which Ripley retained. On the following episode of Raw, Stark won a battle royal to face Ripley for the title one-on-one at Survivor Series: WarGames.

Since June, Seth "Freakin" Rollins, Cody Rhodes, Jey Uso, and Sami Zayn had all been involved in various rivalries with The Judgment Day (Finn Bálor, Damian Priest, and "Dirty" Dominik Mysterio) and their associate, JD McDonagh, encompassing matches for Rollins's World Heavyweight Championship and Bálor and Priest's Undisputed WWE Tag Team Championship. At the conclusion of the November 6 episode of Raw, a brawl ensued between all eight men. Fed up with the constant chaos caused by The Judgment Day, Raw General Manager Adam Pearce announced that Rollins, Rhodes, Uso, and Zayn would face Judgment Day and McDonagh in a WarGames match at Survivor Series: WarGames. The following week, Rhodes and Priest were revealed as the leaders of their respective teams while McDonagh was made an official member of Judgment Day. At the end of the night, Drew McIntyre, who had been talking with Rhea Ripley and had his own past issues with Uso due to Uso's involvement in The Bloodline, helped Bálor and Priest retain the Undisputed WWE Tag Team Championship in a rematch against Rhodes and Uso. On the next episode, McIntyre was added to Judgment Day's WarGames team and later that night, he defeated Uso to earn the WarGames advantage. The fifth member of Rhodes's team was then revealed to be a returning Randy Orton, who had been out with an injury since May 2022.

At SummerSlam, Bianca Belair defeated Asuka and Charlotte Flair in a triple threat match to win the WWE Women's Championship, but immediately lost the title to Iyo Sky, who cashed in her Money in the Bank contract. After the event, Damage CTRL (Bayley, Sky, and Dakota Kai) began feuding with Asuka, as well as Flair, who sided with Asuka. Damage CTRL also sidelined Belair with a knee injury. Sky subsequently retained her championship in matches against Asuka and Flair thanks to interference from Bayley and Kai. After Belair made her return in late October, Sky retained the title against her at Crown Jewel after a returning Kairi Sane (in her first appearance since July 2020) interfered. On the following SmackDown, Sky and Kai said they brought Sane in to make their group stronger, with Sane praising Bayley for her leadership and also said that she forgave Bayley for attacking her back in July 2020. They were then interrupted by Belair, Flair, and Asuka. A six-woman tag team match then took place, which ended in a no contest after Asuka turned on her team, subsequently reuniting with Sane and joining with Damage CTRL. Shotzi attempted to make the save, but was also laid out. The following week, Damage CTRL (represented by Bayley, Sky, Asuka, and Sane) challenged Belair, Flair, Shotzi, and a partner of their choosing to a WarGames match, which was accepted. SmackDown General Manager Nick Aldis gave Belair's team until the end of the night to select their fourth member and they chose Raw's Becky Lynch after Damage CTRL took out the other women on SmackDown. That same night, WWE announced that a Ruffles-sponsored fan vote would be held to determine which team would receive the WarGames advantage.

On the November 10 episode of SmackDown, the Latino World Order (LWO) addressed leader Rey Mysterio's loss of the United States Championship at Crown Jewel to Logan Paul, who used brass knuckles to win. Carlito blamed Santos Escobar as he had left the brass knuckles on the ring apron. Escobar then left in disbelief of the accusation, but later turned heel on Mysterio by injuring his left knee and striking it with the steel steps. The following week, Escobar said that Mysterio was his hero, but after meeting him, he realized he was wrong. A confrontation with the other LWO members (Joaquin Wilde, Cruz Del Toro, and Zelina Vega) occurred, where Escobar attacked Wilde and Toro. Carlito came out for the save but Escobar escaped. Later, a match between Carlito and Escobar was announced for Survivor Series: WarGames. The night before Survivor Series, however, Carlito and Escobar brawled, resulting in Carlito sustaining an arm injury, with Dragon Lee—who came to Carlito's aid—replacing Carlito in the match against Escobar.

== Event ==
Other on-screen personnel
Role:	Name:
English commentators	Michael Cole
English commentators	Corey Graves
Spanish commentators	Marcelo Rodriguez
Spanish commentators	Jerry Soto
Ring announcers	Mike Rome (SmackDown/Men's WarGames match)
Ring announcers	Samantha Irvin (Raw/Women's WarGames match)
Referees	Jason Ayers
Referees	Jessika Carr
Referees	Daphanie LaShaunn
Referees	Eddie Orengo
Referees	Charles Robinson
Referees	Ryan Tran
Referees	Rod Zapata
Pre-show panel	Kayla Braxton
Pre-show panel	Jackie Redmond
Pre-show panel	Peter Rosenberg
Pre-show panel	Booker T
Pre-show panel	Wade Barrett

=== Pre-show ===
The Survivor Series: WarGames Kickoff pre-show was broadcast on WWE's livestreaming platforms as well as YouTube, with the pre-show panel (Kayla Braxton, Jackie Redmond, Peter Rosenberg, Booker T, and Wade Barrett) located outside of the arena. During the pre-show, it was revealed that Bianca Belair's team won the Ruffles-sponsored fan vote to receive the WarGames advantage.

=== Preliminary matches ===
The first match of the PLE was the women's WarGames match, which saw the team of Bianca Belair, Charlotte Flair, Shotzi, and Becky Lynch face Damage CTRL (Bayley, Iyo Sky, Asuka, and Kairi Sane, accompanied by Dakota Kai), with Belair's team having the WarGames advantage. Lynch and Bayley started the match. Early on, Bayley tossed Lynch into the cage. Lynch applied the Dis-Arm-Her but Kai interfered, hitting Lynch with a kendo stick through the cage. Shotzi threw a trash can in the ring. Belair whipped Sky and Bayley with her braids. Sky put a trash can on her head and dove on to everyone from the top of the cage. In another high spot, Flair did a moonsault from the top of the cage onto everyone. There were nearfalls for both teams. Asuka missed a mist on Shotzi, allowing Belair to blast Asuka with a fire extinguisher. Flair attempted a spear on Sane, but Bayley shoved her out of the way and took the spear instead. Belair, Flair, and Shotzi then performed their signature moves on Bayley, with Lynch finishing her off by delivering a Manhandle Slam from the second rope through a table and pinned her to win.

In a backstage segment, Raw's Otis, Akira Tozawa, and Maxxine Dupri of Alpha Academy and WWE Women's Tag Team Champions Chelsea Green and Piper Niven were shown eating Ruffles on a couch watching the event. SmackDown's Pretty Deadly (Elton Prince and Kit Wilson) showed up and argued with Otis on whether they were potato chips or crisps. A returning R-Truth, who had been out with an injury since November 2022, then popped up from behind the couch and settled the argument, stating they were Ruffles and then called for everyone to get along, which ended with Tozawa doing the "Ruffle Shuffle" dance.

After that, Gunther defended the Intercontinental Championship against The Miz. The Miz countered a powerbomb and did some kicks to Gunther's torso. The Miz performed a Skull-Crushing Finale for a nearfall. Gunther performed a top rope splash onto Miz's back and then performed a Boston crab with knee for the submission win.

Next, Santos Escobar faced Dragon Lee. Escobar was quick on the offense at first. Escobar stuck Lee's leg between the ring post and stepped on it, but Lee fought him off. Escobar hit a hurricanrana on Lee, ending with a Phantom Driver and pinned Lee for the win.

In the penultimate match, Rhea Ripley defended the Women's World Championship against Zoey Stark. There was a brawl between the two before the match started. After the match began, Stark hit Ripley with a dropkick. Stark, battling Ripley, was met with kicks. Ripley countered the Z-360 before delivering a headbutt and then hit a Riptide to retain the title.

=== Main event ===
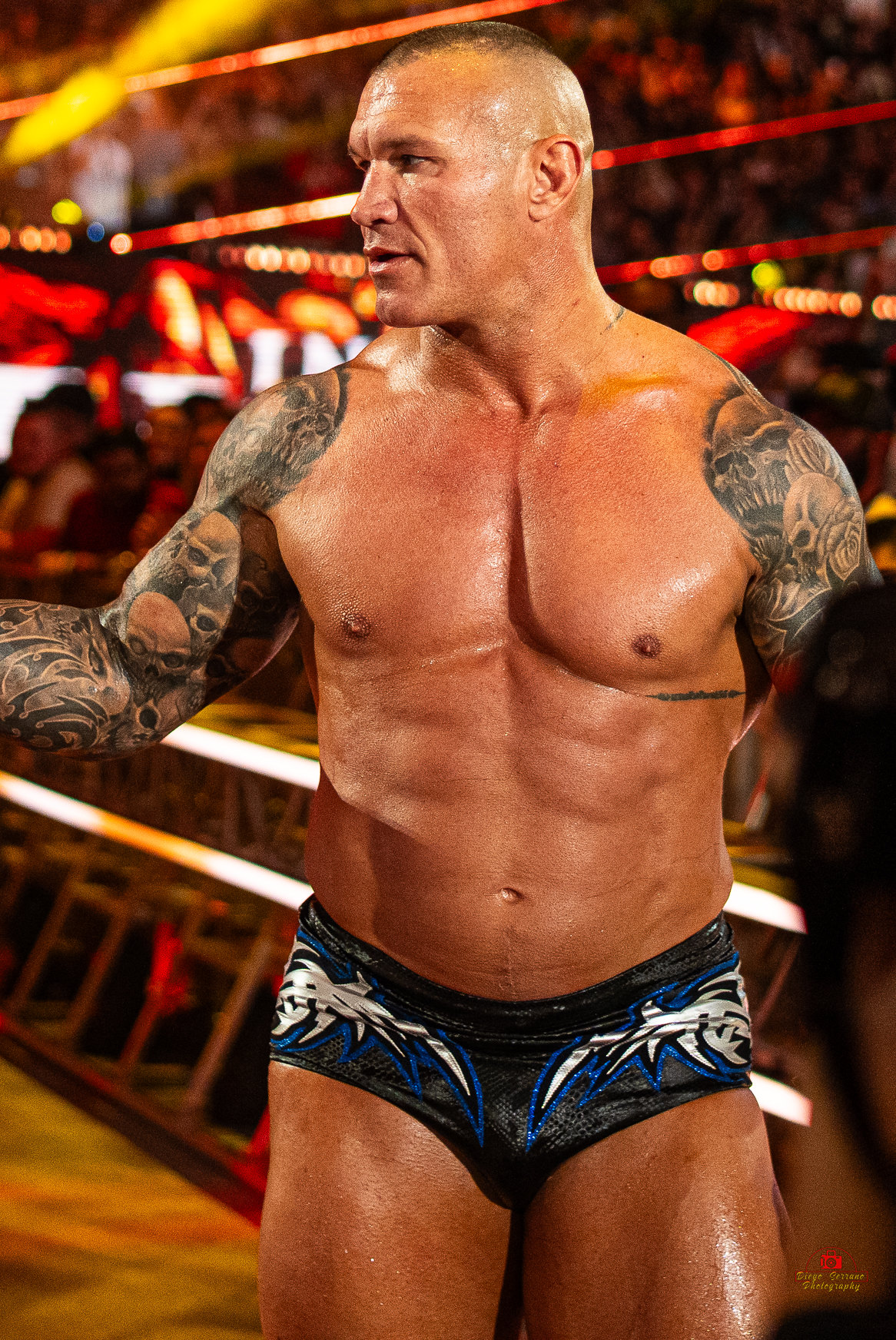
Randy Orton made his return to in-ring competition following an eighteen-month injury hiatus.

The main event was the men's WarGames match, which saw the team of Cody Rhodes, Seth "Freakin" Rollins, Jey Uso, Sami Zayn, and Randy Orton face The Judgment Day (Damian Priest, Finn Bálor, "Dirty" Dominik Mysterio, and JD McDonagh) and Drew McIntyre with Judgment Day's team having the WarGames advantage. Throughout the night prior to and at the start of the main event, Orton had not shown up, causing worry for his team. The first two to enter the cage were Rollins and Bálor. Rollins gained the upper hand before McDonagh entered to turn the tide in his team's favor. Uso entered next to even things up. McIntyre was set to enter next, but Priest stopped him before entering the match himself. Priest grabbed a metal riot baton and hit Uso and Rollins multiple times. Zayn grabbed a table and attacked Priest before tearing a pipe from the cage and using it to attack The Judgment Day. Mysterio found himself outnumbered before the rest of The Judgment Day and McIntyre recovered. Priest and McIntyre performed simultaneous chokeslams on Rhodes, Zayn, and Rollins, before driving Rollins through the table with the Razor's Edge. As the clock counted down for the final time for Orton to appear, Rhea Ripley made an entrance instead with Priest's Money in the Bank contract and a referee in tow. Before the contract could be officially cashed in, however, Orton showed up at the last second, evening the odds with his team performing stereo rope-aided DDTs to The Judgment Day and McIntyre. Just as Orton was poised to hit Priest with an RKO, he turned his attention to Uso who, along with The Bloodline, was responsible for his 18-month absence. Orton taunted Uso, telling him he had not forgotten what he had done before Uso intercepted an attacking Priest with a Superkick, followed by an RKO on Mysterio from Orton. McDonagh was chased to the top of the cage by Zayn and Rollins, and they threw McDonagh down to Orton, who caught him with an RKO. Rhodes then hit Priest with a Cross Rhodes before pinning him for the victory.

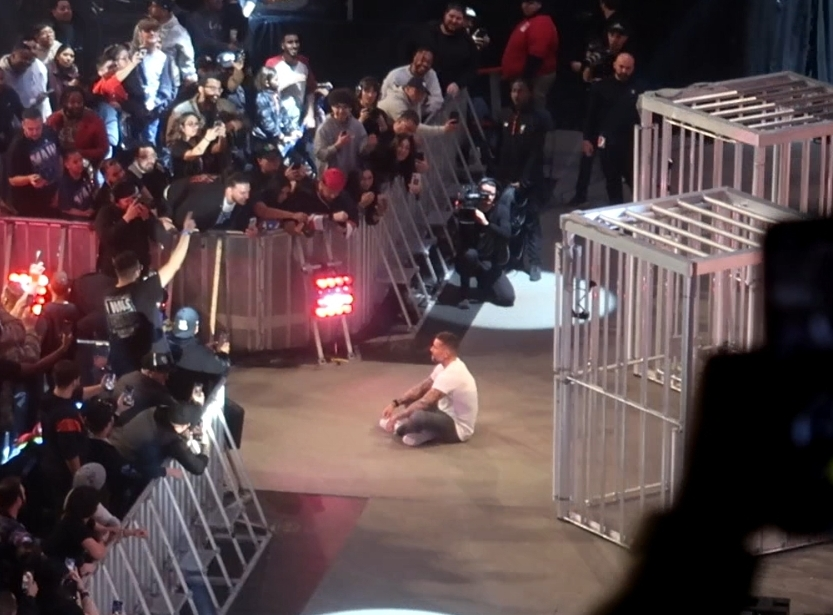
CM Punk returned to WWE for the first time in almost ten years at Survivor Series: WarGames.

As the show was about to go off the air, CM Punk, who had been fired from All Elite Wrestling (AEW) nearly three months prior, made his surprise return to WWE for the first time since the 2014 Royal Rumble (discounting his time with FS1's show WWE Backstage). After the Men's WarGames match, the copyright logo with the Survivor Series press conference logo popped up until a static and remastered rendition of "Cult of Personality" played, signaling Punk's appearance. He lingered around the entrance way, greeting and embracing fans and delivering his iconic "It's Clobberin' Time" catchphrase. The surprise was considered by many as one of the loudest pops in WWE. Despite persistent rumors hinting at his return, WWE never officially addressed them. During the post-show press conference, WWE executive Paul "Triple H" Levesque clarified that the majority, including WWE talent, were unaware of Punk's return until his surprise appearance at the Allstate Arena.

== Reception ==
The event received positive reviews from fans and critics. It also set new records for the highest viewership, largest gate, and best merchandise sales in the history of Survivor Series.

Dave Meltzer of the Wrestling Observer Newsletter rated the women's and men's WarGames matches 4.5 and 4.75 stars, respectively. The Santos Escobar vs. Dragon Lee match received 3.25 stars, the Intercontinental Championship match received 3.5 stars, and the Women's World Championship match received 2.75 stars.

Punk's return at the end of the event was voted for and won the 2024 Slammy Award for OMG Moment of the Year.

== Aftermath ==
=== Raw ===
The following episode of Raw opened with Randy Orton thanking Cody Rhodes for allowing him to be a part of the WarGames match and also acknowledged Rhodes' late father, Dusty Rhodes, for creating the match. Orton then stated that he had unfinished business with The Bloodline, however, he was interrupted by Women's World Champion, Rhea Ripley, who tried recruiting Orton to The Judgment Day. Orton declined and was attacked by Judgment Day stablemates, "Dirty" Dominik Mysterio and JD McDonagh, who received an RKO. Later in the main event, Orton defeated Mysterio. Also, Jey Uso apologized to Orton as he and Jimmy Uso were responsible for Orton's injury. Orton accepted the apology and stated that they were good as long as Jey was not in The Bloodline.

Cody Rhodes would also address the WarGames match and how Orton allowed him to secure the victory for his team. Rhodes also declared his participation in the 2024 Royal Rumble match, however, he was interrupted and attacked by Shinsuke Nakamura. This resulted in a match on the December 11 episode where Rhodes won via disqualification when Nakamura used red mist.

Seth "Freakin" Rollins also praised their team's win at WarGames, after which, Rollins turned his attention to defending his World Heavyweight Championship again. Drew McIntyre then interrupted Rollins and stated that he only joined The Judgment Day's team so he could have Jey Uso in the cage, however, he did not face off with Uso. McIntyre claimed that he would put his issues with Uso behind him as he wanted a rematch for the title from Crown Jewel. However, Rollins stated there were others who deserved a title match first, beginning with Uso the following week, which infuriated McIntyre and he subsequently attacked Rollins. On that subsequent episode, Rollins defeated Uso to retain the title. After the match, McIntyre attacked Rollins and Uso. This also resulted in a match on the December 11 episode where McIntyre defeated Uso. He was then scheduled to face Rollins for the World Heavyweight Championship on the special Day 1 episode of Raw.

In the final segment on Raw, CM Punk addressed his return to WWE, claiming that he was a changed man and that he had to leave back in 2014. Punk then stated that it was time to come back to WWE and show that he truly was the "best in the world". He also thanked the fans for never forgetting him and continuously chanting his name over the years. After appearing on the December 8 episode of SmackDown and at NXT Deadline on December 9 and talking with each brand's respective general manager, Punk made the decision to sign with Raw on the December 11 episode of Raw. He was subsequently confronted by Seth "Freakin" Rollins, who voiced his disdain for Punk. Punk then officially announced his entry into the 2024 Royal Rumble, stating that after he won, he may challenge Rollins for the World Heavyweight Championship at WrestleMania XL.

A rematch between Gunther and The Miz for the Intercontinental Championship was scheduled for the December 18 episode of Raw, with the stipulation that if Miz lost, he couldn't challenge for the Intercontinental Championship anymore as long as Gunther was still the champion. There, Gunther retained once again.

=== SmackDown ===
Bianca Belair opened the following episode of SmackDown, stating that she was still going for Iyo Sky's WWE Women's Championship. Damage CTRL (Sky, Asuka, Kairi Sane, and Dakota Kai) interrupted, with Kai stating that Belair had to get through all of Damage CTRL to get to Sky. Charlotte Flair and Shotzi interrupted, with Flair stating that she would like to go through all of Damage CTRL as well. A brawl broke out with Flair, Shotzi, and Belair standing tall. Later, Belair faced Sane. Prior to match, Bayley, who did not appear with the rest of Damage CTRL in the opening segment, was told by Sky not to interfere in the match. After the rest of Damage CTRL got banned from ringside, Bayley would interfere in the match, but it backfired as Belair got the upper hand and defeated Sane.

Santos Escobar said his issues with Rey Mysterio began when Mysterio sided with Carlito instead of himself over the incident with the brass knuckles. He then said he would take out Joaquin Wilde next and subsequently defeated him in a match. Escobar continued to attack Wilde post-match but was saved by Dragon Lee. This resulted in a rematch with Lee the following week in which Escobar won, which was also a quarterfinal match of a number one contender's United States Championship tournament.

Also on the following SmackDown, the brand's General Manager, Nick Aldis, invited Randy Orton to the show to sign with SmackDown as Orton was a free agent. Raw General Manager Adam Pearce also appeared to try and sway Orton to sign with Raw. During the contract signing, The Bloodline (Jimmy Uso, Solo Sikoa, and Paul Heyman) interrupted, with Sikoa and Uso attacking Orton. After fending them off with help from LA Knight, Orton signed with SmackDown. A triple threat match between Orton, Knight, and AJ Styles was then scheduled for the special New Year's Revolution episode of SmackDown on January 5, 2024, where the winner would face Roman Reigns for the Undisputed WWE Universal Championship at the Royal Rumble. The match ended in a no-contest after The Bloodline attacked all three competitors. It was subsequently announced that Reigns would defend the titles against Knight, Styles, and Orton in a fatal four-way match at the event.

== Results ==
No.	Results	Stipulations	Times
1	Bianca Belair, Charlotte Flair, Shotzi, and Becky Lynch defeated Damage CTRL (Bayley, Asuka, Iyo Sky, and Kairi Sane) (with Dakota Kai) by pinfall	Women's WarGames match	33:35
2	Gunther (c) defeated The Miz by submission	Singles match for the WWE Intercontinental Championship	12:20
3	Santos Escobar defeated Dragon Lee by pinfall	Singles match	7:40
4	Rhea Ripley (c) defeated Zoey Stark by pinfall	Singles match for the Women's World Championship	9:15
5	Cody Rhodes, Seth "Freakin" Rollins, Jey Uso, Sami Zayn, and Randy Orton defeated The Judgment Day (Damian Priest, Finn Bálor, "Dirty" Dominik Mysterio, and JD McDonagh) and Drew McIntyre by pinfall	Men's WarGames match	34:50
(c) / – the champion(s) heading into the match
