= WWE SmackDown's 20th Anniversary =

2019 television event

20th Anniversary of SmackDown
- Promotional poster featuring Sting, Ember Moon, Randy Orton, Hulk Hogan, and Becky Lynch
- Promotion: WWE
- Brand(s): Raw; SmackDown
- Date: October 4, 2019
- City: Los Angeles, California
- Venue: Staples Center
- Attendance: 17,588
- Tagline(s): We're All Superstars; Celebrating 20 Years

SmackDown special episodes chronology
← Previous; SuperSmackDown LIVE: The Great American Bash	Next → Friday Night SmackDown Season 2 Premiere

SmackDown's 20th Anniversary, or the 20th Anniversary of SmackDown, was a special episode of WWE's weekly television program SmackDown that took place on October 4, 2019, and commemorated the program's 20th anniversary. It was broadcast live on Fox, and marked the SmackDown's return to Friday nights (thus it was renamed to Friday Night SmackDown).

The broadcast featured current WWE wrestlers from the Raw and SmackDown brand divisions as well as Hall of Famers and Legends from the past. The main event saw Brock Lesnar defeat Kofi Kingston in eight seconds to win the WWE Championship for a fifth time in what was Lesnar's first match on the brand in 15 years. In other prominent matches, Kevin Owens defeated Shane McMahon in a ladder match resulting in Shane being (kayfabe) fired, Roman Reigns defeated Erick Rowan in a lumberjack match, and in the opening bout, Charlotte Flair and Becky Lynch defeated Bayley and Sasha Banks.

The event also saw Dwayne "The Rock" Johnson's first appearance on SmackDown in over five years, and the WWE debut of mixed martial artist Cain Velasquez and professional boxer Tyson Fury.

== Background ==
=== Production ===
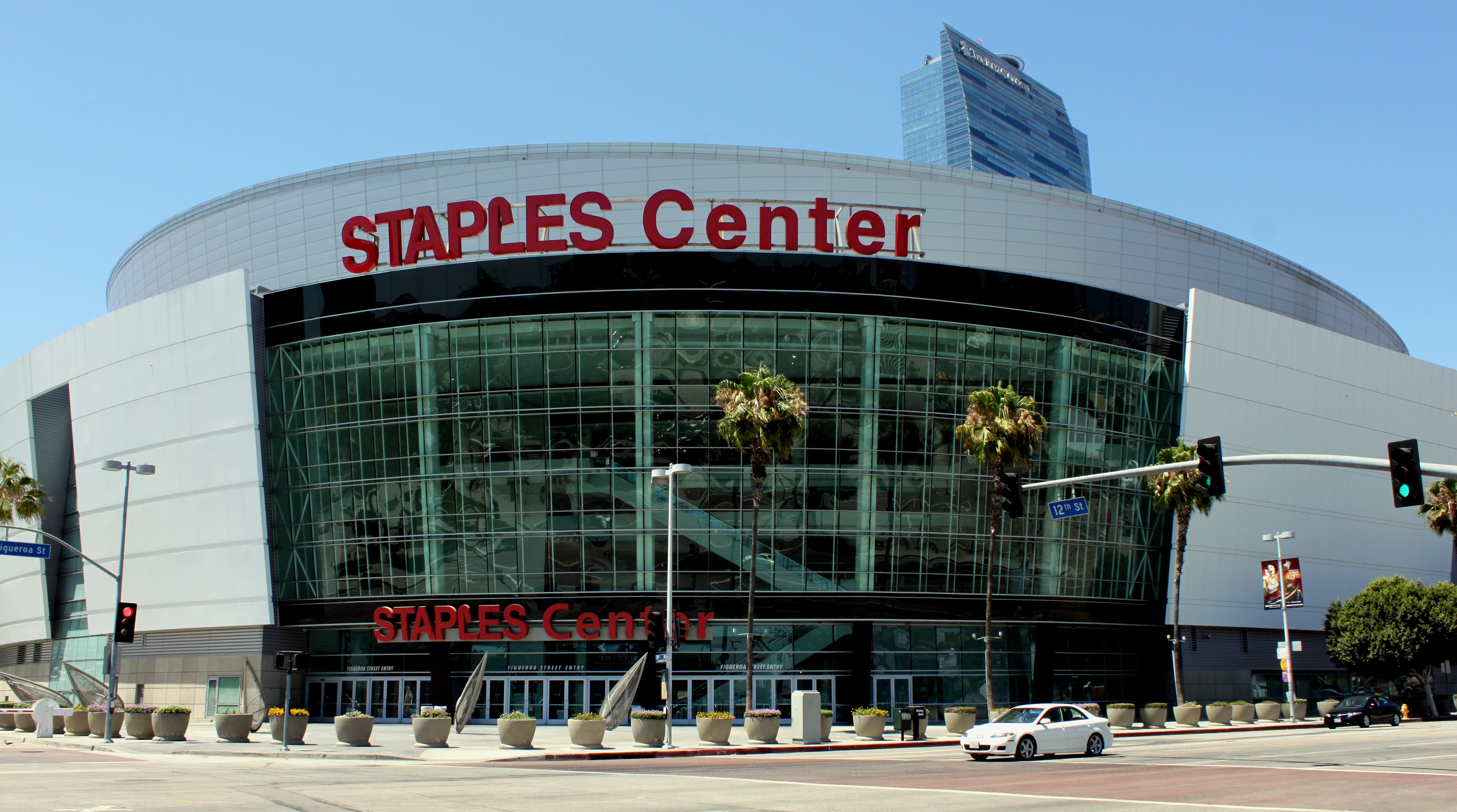
The debut episode of Friday Night SmackDown on FOX was held at the Staples Center in Los Angeles, California.

SmackDown! made its debut as a professional wrestling television special for the World Wrestling Federation (now WWE) on UPN on April 29, 1999, and made its debut as a weekly program for the network on August 26. Over the years it had shifted networks; before its move to Fox, SmackDown had previously aired on some Fox affiliates that had UPN programming before become The CW in 2006 and its sister syndication service MyNetworkTV from October 2008 to September 2010.

On June 26, 2018, WWE announced that SmackDown would move to Fox on Friday nights beginning on October 4, 2019, under a five-year contract valued at $205 million per-year. Amid a competitive bidding situation, NBCUniversal and USA Network chose to focus on retaining Raw. The move to pursue SmackDown came as part of Fox's increasing focus on live sports programming and non-scripted entertainment, in the wake of the then-upcoming sale of its film and television studios to Disney. The network's founder Rupert Murdoch promised extensive promotion of the program during its sports telecasts, and proposed a weekly WWE studio show on its cable network FS1. On June 17, 2019, the Staples Center was chosen as the host venue for the event. Tickets went on sale on August 16.

On September 26, 2019, WWE announced that Michael Cole would be returning to SmackDown for the first time since 2008 to lead the commentary team alongside his former Raw colleagues Corey Graves and Renee Young. The following night, Fox aired a special, SmackDown's Greatest Hits, which featured memorable moments from the program's 20-year history. Booker T and Young hosted a half-hour kickoff special prior to the premiere, joined by Fox Sports reporter Charissa Thompson as "blue carpet" correspondent.

=== Storylines ===
The show comprised matches that resulted from scripted storylines, where wrestlers portrayed heroes, villains, or less distinguishable characters in scripted events that built tension and culminated in a wrestling match or series of matches. Results were predetermined by WWE's writers on the Raw and SmackDown brands, while storylines were produced on WWE's weekly television shows, Monday Night Raw and SmackDown Live (with this broadcast renaming the latter to Friday Night SmackDown).

At Clash of Champions, Kofi Kingston defeated Randy Orton to retain the WWE Championship. On the following SmackDown, after The New Day (Kingston, Big E, and Xavier Woods) defeated the team of Orton and SmackDown Tag Team Champions The Revival (Scott Dawson and Dash Wilder) in a six-man tag team match, Brock Lesnar (accompanied by Paul Heyman) returned and challenged Kingston for the WWE Championship, which Kingston accepted.

On the September 9 episode of Raw, Becky Lynch and Charlotte Flair defeated The Boss 'n' Hug Connection (Bayley and Sasha Banks) in a tag team match, after Lynch and Flair were attacked by the two the previous week. At Clash of Champions, Lynch retained her Raw Women's Championship against Banks by disqualification, while Bayley retained her SmackDown Women's Championship against Flair. On the following Raw, after a tag team match against WWE Women's Tag Team Champions Alexa Bliss and Nikki Cross, Banks and Bayley were attacked with steel chairs by Lynch and Flair. On the September 24 episode of SmackDown, after Banks and Bayley defeated Flair and Carmella, they were attacked by Lynch and Flair again. Later that night, a tag team match pitting Lynch and Flair against The Boss 'n' Hug Connection was scheduled for October 4. Prior to the announcement on the September 16 episode of Raw, after Banks and Bayley were attacked by Flair and Lynch, Banks challenged Lynch to a rematch for the Raw Women's Championship at Hell in a Cell, and Lynch accepted as a Hell in a Cell match.

Over the summer of 2019, Kevin Owens became furious with Shane McMahon due to the latter taking up more and more screen time each week from other wrestlers and exerting even more authority, which was in contradiction to what The McMahon Family (Vince McMahon, Stephanie McMahon, Shane McMahon, and Triple H) had promised several months prior. Despite Shane's attempts to ban Owens from SmackDown, Owens would nevertheless show up and attack Shane at opportune moments. During Raw Reunion on July 22, Owens challenged Shane to a match at SummerSlam and said he would quit the WWE if he were to lose, and Shane accepted. Owens went on to defeat Shane at the event. Two nights later on SmackDown, Shane fined Owens US$100,000 for attacking a designated official, Elias, who was again appointed as the special guest enforcer for Owens' match against Samoa Joe where Elias cost Owens the match by making a fast three count. Owens then tried to sympathize with Shane to lift the fine. Shane said he would consider it, but then cost Owens his King of the Ring tournament match against Elias by taking over as ref and making a fast three count. Shane then replaced Elias, who got injured, in the King of the Ring semi-finals against Chad Gable and promised that he would lift Owens' fine as long as Owens was the referee for the match and "did his job correctly". Gable made quick work of Shane, pinning him in under a minute. Shane then made the match a two out of three falls match and attacked Owens, but Gable made Shane submit to win. Despite Owens calling the match fairly, Shane fired him. Owens then threatened Shane with a lawsuit for wrongful termination as Shane had attacked a designated official (Owens). Shane gave Owens two options: if Owens pursued the lawsuit, he would keep Owens in court indefinitely, but if Owens dropped the lawsuit, he would be reinstated but still have to pay the fine. Owens instead challenged Shane to a ladder match where if Shane won, Owens would drop the lawsuit and leave the WWE for good, but if Owens won, Shane would be gone and Shane accepted.

Prior to SummerSlam, Erick Rowan had attacked Roman Reigns backstage and lied about it. When Reigns found footage that showed Rowan as the culprit, this caused Rowan and Daniel Bryan to split their tag team due to Rowan lying, and a match between Reigns and Rowan was scheduled for Clash of Champions. Rowan then defeated Reigns in a No Disqualification match at Clash of Champions thanks to the returning Luke Harper, reforming their tag team. A rematch between Rowan and Reigns was scheduled for October 4 as a lumberjack match. Prior to the announcement on the September 24 episode of SmackDown, Reigns and Bryan challenged Rowan and Harper to a tag team match at Hell in a Cell which was made official.

Despite being advertised for the show and arriving backstage, "Stone Cold" Steve Austin, The Undertaker, and Sting did not appear on the broadcast, with Undertaker later posting on his official Instagram page that he "wasn't needed."

== Event ==
=== Dark match ===
Before the event went live, Ali defeated Buddy Murphy in a dark match.

=== Preliminary matches ===
The actual event opened with Raw Women's Champion Becky Lynch praising SmackDown only for King Corbin to interrupt, followed by The Rock. After exchanging verbal insults, Lynch and Rock attacked Corbin with multiple punches. Lynch performed a leg drop on Corbin, while Rock followed up with The People's Elbow and the Rock Bottom on Corbin to end the segment.

In the first match, Raw Women’s Champion Becky Lynch and Charlotte Flair faced Sasha Banks and SmackDown Women's Champion Bayley. In the end, Flair forced Bayley to submit to the Figure-Eight Leglock to win the match.

Next was a champion versus champion match with Universal Champion Seth Rollins against Intercontinental Champion Shinsuke Nakamura in Rollins' first match on SmackDown since 2016. Before the match began, Bray Wyatt appeared in the Firefly Fun House and taunted Rollins about their match at Hell in a Cell. The match ended in a no-contest when Wyatt as The Fiend appeared and attacked Rollins with The Mandible Claw with The Fiend throwing Rollins off the stage.

After that was the ladder match between Kevin Owens and Shane McMahon with both of their jobs on the line. Shane dominated at the beginning of the match by striking Owens with multiple objects and performing an elbow drop on Owens through the announce table. Owens then performed a frog splash on Shane through a ladder. In the end, as Shane ascended the ladder, Owens caught him with a Powerbomb through a ladder. Owens then climbed the ladder and retrieved the briefcase to win the match. As per the stipulation, Shane was (kayfabe) fired.

After that, Braun Strowman, The Miz, and Heavy Machinery (Otis and Tucker) faced Randy Orton, United States Champion AJ Styles, and Raw Tag Team Champions Robert Roode and Dolph Ziggler in an eight-man tag team match. In the end, Strowman performed a powerslam on Ziggler to win the match. During the match, Strowman had taunted boxing star Tyson Fury, who was seated in the front row. After the match, Fury jumped the barricade but was restrained by security.

In a backstage segment, DJ Marshmello tripped and fell on top of Carmella, thus pinning her to win the WWE 24/7 Championship. Additional footage was shown on WWE's website and social medias showing Carmella winning back the title.

In the penultimate match, Roman Reigns faced Erick Rowan in a lumberjack match. In the end, Reigns performed a Spear on Rowan to win the match.

=== Main event ===
In the main event, Kofi Kingston defended the WWE Championship against Brock Lesnar (accompanied by Paul Heyman)—Lesnar's first match on television in 15 years. As Kingston ran and leapt at Lesnar, Lesnar caught him and performed an F-5 to win the title in eight seconds. Following the match, Rey Mysterio, who Lesnar had brutally attacked on the previous Raw (along with Mysterio's son Dominik), came out with Cain Velasquez (making his WWE debut), who had defeated Lesnar by technical knockout to win the UFC Heavyweight Championship at UFC 121 in October 2010. Velasquez entered the ring and attacked Lesnar with numerous body shots until Lesnar retreated.

== Aftermath ==
In a backstage interview after SmackDown went off the air, Cain Velasquez stated that he came for revenge from Brock Lesnar for what he did to Rey Mysterio's son Dominik, who was later revealed to be Velasquez's godson. Afterwards, it was announced that Lesnar would defend the WWE Championship against Velasquez at Crown Jewel.

Due to Charlotte Flair making Bayley submit in the tag team match, Flair was granted a match for the SmackDown Women's Championship against Bayley at Hell in a Cell.

On the following Raw, Tyson Fury appeared, wanting an apology from Braun Strowman. Strowman claimed he was just messing around on SmackDown until Fury seemed to indicate that he wanted to fight. After some verbal insults, a massive brawl broke out between the two that had to be separated by security and other wrestlers. A match between the two was scheduled for Crown Jewel.

== Results ==
No.	Results	Stipulations	Times
1^{D}	Ali defeated Buddy Murphy	Singles match	3:00
2	Becky Lynch and Charlotte Flair defeated Bayley and Sasha Banks by submission	Tag team match	8:12
3	Seth Rollins vs. Shinsuke Nakamura ended in a no contest	Singles match	2:00
4	Kevin Owens defeated Shane McMahon	Career vs. Career Ladder match A briefcase full of legal documents was hung above the ring, the winner was the first to grab the case, and the loser was fired.	12:01
5	Braun Strowman, The Miz, and Heavy Machinery (Otis and Tucker) defeated AJ Styles, Randy Orton, Dolph Ziggler, and Robert Roode by pinfall	Eight-man tag team match	3:09
6	Roman Reigns defeated Erick Rowan by pinfall	Lumberjack match (Note: The lumberjacks were: Ali, Andrade, Apollo Crews, Bo Dallas, Cesaro, Cedric Alexander, Chad Gable, Curtis Axel, Curt Hawkins, Dash Wilder, Erik, Heath Slater, Karl Anderson, Ivar, Luke Gallows, No Way Jose, Ricochet, Scott Dawson, Shelton Benjamin, Shinsuke Nakamura, Titus O'Neil, and Zack Ryder.)	8:53
7	Brock Lesnar (with Paul Heyman) defeated Kofi Kingston (c) by pinfall	Singles match for the WWE Championship	0:07
(c) / – the champion(s) heading into the match; D / – this was a dark match

== See also ==
- List of WWE SmackDown special episodes
