= WWE Friday Night SmackDown Season 2 Premiere =

2020 television event

Friday Night SmackDown Season 2 Premiere
- Promotion: WWE
- Brand(s): Raw; SmackDown
- Date: October 16, 2020
- City: Orlando, Florida
- Venue: WWE ThunderDome at Amway Center
- Attendance: 0

SmackDown special episodes chronology
← Previous; SmackDown's 20th Anniversary	Next → New Year's Revolution

Friday Night SmackDown Season 2 Premiere was a special episode of WWE's weekly television program SmackDown that took place on October 16, 2020, and commemorated the program's second season's premiere. It was broadcast live on Fox, and marked the 1-year celebration of return to Friday nights (thus being renamed Friday Night SmackDown).

The broadcast featured current WWE wrestlers from the Raw and SmackDown brands as well as Hall of Famers and Legends from the past. The main event saw Roman Reigns retain the WWE Universal Championship by defeating Braun Strowman by technical submission. In other matches, Lars Sullivan defeated Jeff Hardy in the opening bout, The New Day (Big E, Kofi Kingston and Xavier Woods) teamed up for the last time as a stable to defeat Cesaro, Shinsuke Nakamura and Sheamus, and The Street Profits (Angelo Dawkins and Montez Ford) defeated Dolph Ziggler and Robert Roode via disqualification to retain the WWE SmackDown Tag Team Championship.

== Background ==
=== Production ===
SmackDown! made its debut as a professional wrestling television special for the World Wrestling Federation (now WWE) on UPN on April 29, 1999, and made its debut as a weekly program for the network on August 26. Over the years it had shifted networks; before its move to Fox, SmackDown had previously aired on its sister syndication service MyNetworkTV from October 2008 to September 2010. On June 26, 2018, WWE announced that SmackDown would move to Fox on Friday nights beginning in 2019, under a five-year contract valued at $205 million per-year. Amid a competitive bidding situation, NBCUniversal and USA Network chose to focus on retaining Raw. The move to pursue SmackDown came as part of Fox's increasing focus on live sports programming and non-scripted entertainment, in the wake of the then-upcoming sale of its film and television studios to Disney. The network's founder Rupert Murdoch promised extensive promotion of the program during its sports telecasts, and proposed a weekly WWE studio show on its cable network FS1.

On September 26, 2019, WWE announced that Michael Cole would be returning to SmackDown for the first time since 2008 to lead the commentary team alongside his former Raw colleagues Corey Graves and Renee Young. The following night, Fox aired a special, SmackDown's Greatest Hits, which featured memorable moments from the program's 20-year history. Booker T and Young hosted a half-hour kickoff special prior to the premiere, joined by Fox Sports reporter Charissa Thompson as "blue carpet" correspondent.

=== Storylines ===
The show included six matches that resulted from scripted storylines, where wrestlers portrayed heroes, villains, or less distinguishable characters in scripted events that built tension and culminated in a wrestling match or series of matches. Results were predetermined by WWE's writers on the Raw and SmackDown brands, while storylines were produced on WWE's weekly television shows, Monday Night Raw and SmackDown Live (with this broadcast renaming the latter to Friday Night SmackDown).

At Payback on August 31, Roman Reigns defeated defending champion "The Fiend" Bray Wyatt and Braun Strowman, who he pinned, in a No Holds Barred Triple Threat match to win the WWE Universal Championship. It was later announced that Reigns would defend the title against Strowman at the SmackDown: Season 2 Premiere.

== Event ==
=== Preliminary matches ===
In the first match, Jeff Hardy faced Lars Sullivan. Hardy performed a dropkick and an enzuigiri on Sullivan. Sullivan performed a shoulder block on Hardy. Sullivan attempted a frog splash, but Hardy rolled out of the way, causing Sullivan to land face-first onto the mat. Hardy performed a sitout jawbreaker, an inverted atomic drop, and a Whisper in the Wind on Sullivan but the latter kicked out at one. At ringside, Hardy attempted a maneuver with the steel steps on Sullivan, but the latter caught him and slammed him onto the ring apron, avoiding a countout at an 8-count. Hardy performed a Twist of Fate on Sullivan. As Hardy climbed to the top turnbuckle to perform another senton bomb, Sullivan caught him and performed a Freak Accident on him to win the match.

After that, The New Day (Big E, Kofi Kingston and Xavier Woods) faced Cesaro, Sheamus and Shinsuke Nakamura in a six-man tag team match. Kingston performed a dropkick off the turnbuckle on Cesaro. Big E performed a powerbomb on Woods onto Sheamus. Kingston performed a frog splash on Sheamus for a near-fall. Cesaro performed a European uppercut on Big E. Big E performed a uranage on Sheamus. Cesaro performed a clothesline on Woods at ringside. Kingston performed a suicide dive on Cesaro and Nakamura. Sheamus performed a Brogue kick on Big E. Kingston performed an enzuigiri and a headbutt on Sheamus. The end saw Big E perform a Big Ending on Sheamus to win for his team.

In the penultimate match, The Street Profits defended the SmackDown Tag Team Championships against Robert Roode and Dolph Ziggler. Dawkins performed a shoulder block, a leapfrog, and a dropkick on Ziggler. Roode performed a vertical suplex on Dawkins for a near-fall. Roode knocked Ford off the ring apron and performed another vertical suplex on Dawkins. Ziggler performed a leg drop on Dawkins but Ford broke up the pinfall at a two-count. In the end, Roode and Ziggler double teamed on Ford, resulting in The Street Profits retaining their championship by disqualification.

=== Main event ===
In the main event, Roman Reigns defended the Universal Championship against Braun Strowman. At ringside, Reigns performed a headbutt on Strowman. He then drove Strowman into steel steps. Reigns also avoided a countout at a 5-count before once again leaving the ring to continue attacking Strowman. Reigns slammed Strowman's head onto an announce table. Strowman attacked Reigns with a knee to the midsection before driving the latter into a ringpost, over the announce table, and then over the barricade. Back in the ring, Reings attempted a Superman punch, but Strowman countered and attempted a running powerslam on Reigns, who also countered and drove Strowman into a corner. As Reigns attempted a spear, Strowman caught Reigns. However, Reigns was able to perform a guillotine choke, in which Strowman passed out, therefore retaining the championship.

== Results ==
No.	Results	Stipulations	Times
1	Lars Sullivan defeated Jeff Hardy	Singles match	4:20
2	The New Day (Big E, Kofi Kingston, and Xavier Woods) defeated Sheamus, Cesaro, and , Shinsuke Nakamura	Six-man tag team match	14:45
3	The Street Profits (Angelo Dawkins and Montez Ford) (c) defeated Dolph Ziggler and Robert Roode by disqualification	Tag team match for the WWE SmackDown Tag Team Championship	1:30
4	Roman Reigns (c) (with Paul Heyman) defeated Braun Strowman by technical submission	Singles match for the WWE Universal Championship	10:40
(c) / – the champion(s) heading into the match

== See also ==
- List of WWE SmackDown special episodes
