= TLC: Tables, Ladders & Chairs (2018) =

WWE pay-per-view and livestreaming event

- Promotional poster featuring Seth Rollins and Dean Ambrose
- Promotion: WWE
- Brand(s): Raw; SmackDown; 205 Live
- Date: December 16, 2018
- City: San Jose, California
- Venue: SAP Center
- Attendance: 13,108

WWE event chronology
← Previous; Starrcade	Next → NXT UK TakeOver: Blackpool

TLC: Tables, Ladders & Chairs chronology
← Previous; 2017	Next → 2019

The 2018 TLC: Tables, Ladders & Chairs was a professional wrestling pay-per-view (PPV) and livestreaming event produced by WWE, held for wrestlers from the promotion's main roster brands, Raw, SmackDown, and 205 Live. It was the 10th annual TLC: Tables, Ladders & Chairs and took place on December 16, 2018, at the SAP Center in San Jose, California. The concept of the show was based around the primary matches of the card each utilizing tables, ladders, and chairs as legal weapons.

Twelve matches were contested at the event, including two on the Kickoff pre-show. In the main event, Asuka defeated defending champion Becky Lynch and Charlotte Flair in the first women's triple threat Tables, Ladders, and Chairs (TLC) match to capture her first SmackDown Women's Championship, which was also the first time the title was contested in the main event match of a PPV and livestreaming event. In the penultimate match, Dean Ambrose defeated Seth Rollins to win Raw's Intercontinental Championship for a third time. In other prominent matches, Daniel Bryan defeated AJ Styles to retain SmackDown's WWE Championship, Ronda Rousey defeated Nia Jax to retain the Raw Women's Championship, and Braun Strowman defeated Baron Corbin in a TLC match to earn a match against Brock Lesnar for Raw's Universal Championship at the Royal Rumble as well as stripping Corbin of all authoritative power.

The event was originally planned to be held exclusively for the Raw brand, like the previous year, but after April's WrestleMania 34, brand-exclusive PPV and livestreaming events for the main roster under the second brand split were discontinued. This made it the first TLC event since 2010 to feature multiple brands during a brand split as well as the first to feature three brands since 2009. The event was also originally scheduled to be held on October 21 at the TD Garden in Boston, Massachusetts, which would have been its second time at the venue after 2015, but due to the scheduling of the all-women's event Evolution on October 28, TLC was pushed back and took the date and location of an originally planned Clash of Champions, which also returned TLC to its regular December slot after the 2017 event was held in October.

== Production ==
=== Background ===
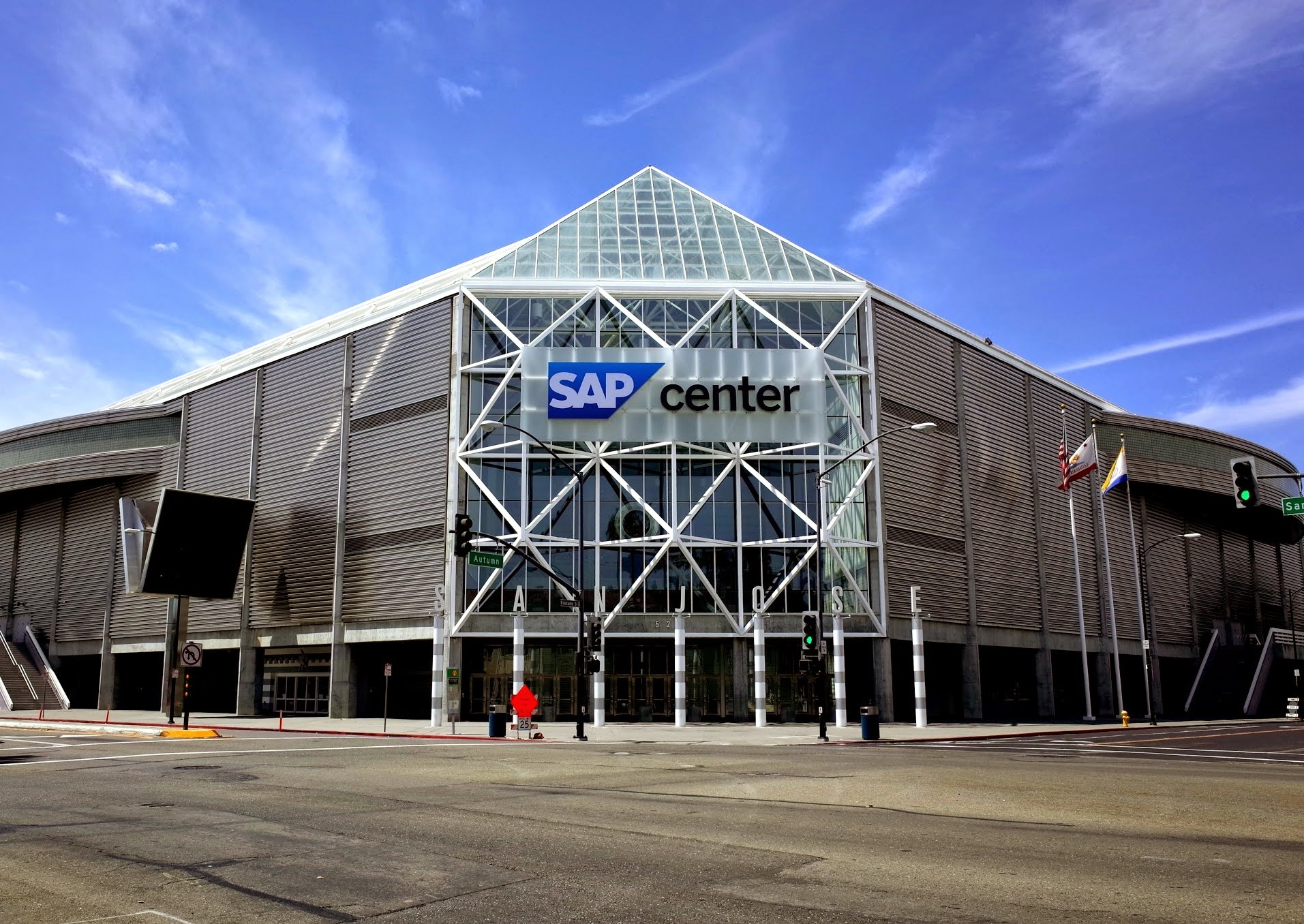
The 10th annual TLC: Tables, Ladders & Chairs was held at the SAP Center in San Jose, California.

TLC: Tables, Ladders & Chairs was an annual professional wrestling event generally produced every December by WWE since 2009. It was originally broadcast exclusively via pay-per-view (PPV) before it began simultaneously livestreaming on the WWE Network in 2014. The concept of the event was based on the primary matches of the card each containing a stipulation using tables, ladders, and chairs as legal weapons, with the main event generally being a Tables, Ladders, and Chairs match.

On November 22, 2017, the 10th TLC event was originally announced to be held on October 21, 2018, at the TD Garden in Boston, Massachusetts. This would have been the second time the event was held at the venue, after 2015, and the second to take place in October, after 2017. However, as first reported on July 10, 2018, and later confirmed on September 10, the 2018 event's scheduling was changed to December 16 at the SAP Center in San Jose, California, which was the date and location for an originally planned Clash of Champions. This change came as a result of the scheduling of WWE's first all-women's event, Evolution, on October 28, which returned TLC to its traditional December slot. Tickets went on sale on September 21 through Ticketmaster.

The 2018 event was planned to again be Raw-exclusive, like the previous year, but following WrestleMania 34 in April, WWE discontinued brand-exclusive PPV and livestreaming events for the main roster, thus the 2018 event featured wrestlers from the Raw, SmackDown, and 205 Live brand divisions. This was subsequently the first TLC since 2010 to feature multiple brands during a brand split as well as the first to feature three brands since 2009.

=== Storylines ===
The event comprised 12 matches, including two on the Kickoff pre-show, which resulted from scripted storylines. Results were predetermined by WWE's writers on the Raw, SmackDown, and 205 Live brands, while storylines were produced on WWE's weekly television shows, Monday Night Raw, SmackDown Live, and the cruiserweight-exclusive 205 Live.

On September 4, 2018, the finals of the 2nd Mixed Match Challenge were scheduled for TLC. On November 12, the winning team were reserved the number 30 spot for both the men's and women's Royal Rumbles at its own event. On December 11, the final two teams were determined to be Mahalicia (Jinder Mahal and Alicia Fox) and Fabulous Truth (R-Truth and Carmella).

On the October 22 episode of Raw, after Seth Rollins and Dean Ambrose won the Raw Tag Team Championship, Ambrose attacked Rollins, turning heel. Two weeks later on Raw, Ambrose attacked Rollins again, after the latter lost the titles in a handicap match. The following week, Ambrose burned his Shield gear and explained that being part of the group had made him weak. Rollins was scheduled to defend the Intercontinental Championship against Ambrose at TLC.

On the Raw prior to Survivor Series, Braun Strowman demanded to have another Universal Championship match against Brock Lesnar as well as a match against Acting Raw General Manager Baron Corbin, who had cost Strowman his Universal title match at Crown Jewel, and get to choose the stipulation for both. Raw Commissioner Stephanie McMahon agreed under the condition that Strowman would help Raw to victory over SmackDown at Survivor Series, and that Strowman would not touch Corbin until after the event. Stephanie also said that if Raw was successful in the interpromotional matches on the main card at Survivor Series, Stephanie would consider making Corbin the permanent Raw General Manager. Raw indeed won all interpromotional matches on the main card, with Strowman scoring the final elimination in his respective match. The following night on Raw, Strowman was granted a match with Corbin at TLC and chose a Tables, Ladders, and Chairs match. Stephanie added the stipulation that if Strowman won, Strowman would get his Universal Championship match at the Royal Rumble, and Corbin would be removed from authoritative power, but if Corbin won, Corbin would become the permanent Raw General Manager. The same night, Bobby Lashley and Drew McIntyre crushed Strowman's elbow with the steel steps. Strowman required surgery, leaving his TLC match in limbo. The following week, Corbin said he would not cancel their match and would accept the win by forfeit.

At Evolution, Nia Jax won a 20-woman battle royal to earn an opportunity at the Raw Women's Championship. At Survivor Series, Jax was the sole survivor of the women's elimination match. The following night on Raw, Jax's championship match against Raw Women's Champion Ronda Rousey was confirmed for TLC.

On the November 13 episode of SmackDown, Daniel Bryan defeated AJ Styles to win the WWE Championship after attacking Styles with a low blow while the referee was incapacitated and continued to attack Styles after the match, thus turning heel. On the following SmackDown, Bryan explained his actions, stating that Bryan was following his dreams and that the fans were not with him during his recovery to return to the ring, and christened himself as the "new Daniel Bryan". A rematch between the two for the title was scheduled for TLC.

At Survivor Series, SmackDown Women's Champion Becky Lynch was originally scheduled to face Raw Women's Champion Ronda Rousey, but due to a legit broken nose and concussion sustained just days prior to the event, Lynch was replaced by Charlotte Flair, who was disqualified for brutally attacking Rousey. On the following SmackDown, Flair explained that she attacked Rousey for Lynch, but a week later, Flair said that she actually did it all for herself. When a Tables, Ladders, and Chairs match between the two for the SmackDown Women's Championship was scheduled for TLC, the remaining eight women of the SmackDown roster took exception, demanding their chance at the championship. An ensuing eight-woman battle royal was won by Asuka, who was subsequently added to the TLC match, making it a triple threat TLC match for the title, also marking the first women's triple threat match contested under the stipulation.

At Survivor Series, Drew McIntyre and Finn Bálor came to blows when tagging in to the men's elimination match, resulting in a confrontation between the two. Bálor also made an enemy of Acting Raw General Manager Baron Corbin, who scheduled Bálor to face McIntyre at TLC.

On the SmackDown 1000 episode on October 16, The Bar (Cesaro and Sheamus) defeated The New Day (represented by Big E and Xavier Woods) to win the SmackDown Tag Team Championship with help from Big Show. On the November 27 episode of SmackDown, The Usos (Jey Uso and Jimmy Uso) defeated The Bar. On November 30, a triple threat tag team match between the three teams was scheduled for TLC.

On the December 3 episode of Raw, The Riott Squad (Ruby Riott, Liv Morgan, and Sarah Logan) came out and distracted Ronda Rousey and Natalya, after which, Nia Jax and Tamina attacked Rousey and Natalya. The Riott Squad then powerbombed Natalya off the ring apron through a table. On December 6, a tables match between Natalya and Riott was scheduled for TLC.

Following Rey Mysterio's full-time return to WWE, Randy Orton began attacking him after matches. A chairs match between the two was scheduled for TLC.

For several weeks, Elias and Bobby Lashley interrupted each other's promos, often ending in a brawl between the two, also involving Lashley's manager Lio Rush. On November 30, a match between Elias and Lashley was scheduled for the TLC Kickoff pre-show. On the December 10 episode of Raw, it was revealed their match would be a ladder match with a guitar hanging above the ring.

At Super Show-Down, Buddy Murphy defeated Cedric Alexander to win the WWE Cruiserweight Championship. Murphy then successfully retained the title against Mustafa Ali at Survivor Series. On December 10, 205 Live General Manager Drake Maverick scheduled Alexander's contractual rematch for the TLC Kickoff pre-show.

== Event ==
Other on-screen personnel
Role:	Name:
English commentators	Michael Cole (Raw/Mixed)
English commentators	Corey Graves (Raw/SmackDown)
English commentators	Renee Young (Raw/Mixed)
English commentators	Tom Phillips (SmackDown)
English commentators	David Otunga (SmackDown)
English commentators	Vic Joseph (Cruiserweights/Mixed)
English commentators	Nigel McGuinness (Cruiserweights)
English commentators	Percy Watson (Cruiserweights)
Spanish commentators	Carlos Cabrera
Spanish commentators	Marcelo Rodríguez
German commentators	Carsten Schaefer
German commentators	Calvin Knie
Ring announcers	Greg Hamilton (SmackDown/205 Live)
Ring announcers	JoJo (Raw)
Ring announcers	Mike Rome (Mixed)
Referees	Danilo Anfibio
Referees	Mike Chioda
Referees	John Cone
Referees	Dan Engler
Referees	Darrick Moore
Referees	Chad Patton
Referees	Heath Slater
Referees	Ryan Tran
Interviewers	Charly Caruso
Interviewers	Kayla Braxton
Pre-show panel	Jonathan Coachman
Pre-show panel	Booker T
Pre-show panel	Sam Roberts
Pre-show panel	David Otunga

=== Pre-show ===
During the TLC: Tables, Ladders & Chairs Kickoff pre-show, two matches were contested. In the first match, Buddy Murphy defended the WWE Cruiserweight Championship against Cedric Alexander. In the end, Murphy performed "Murphy's Law" on Alexander to retain the title.

In the second match, Elias faced Bobby Lashley in a ladder match with a guitar hanging above the ring. In the climax, Elias won the match by ascending the ladder and retrieving the guitar. After the match, Lashley attacked Elias.

=== Preliminary matches ===
The actual pay-per-view opened with the finals of the second Mixed Match Challenge which saw the tag team of Fabulous Truth (R-Truth and Carmella) face the tag team of Mahalicia (Jinder Mahal and Alicia Fox). In the end, Carmella applied the "Code of Silence" on Fox forcing Carmella to submit to win the match. With the win, Fabulous Truth won an all-expense-paid vacation to a destination of their choice - to Carmella's dismay, R-Truth chose WWE Headquarters in Stamford, Connecticut - as well as R-Truth and Carmella receiving the number 30 spot in the men's and women's Royal Rumble matches, respectively.

Next, The Bar (Cesaro and Sheamus) defended the SmackDown Tag Team Championship against The New Day (Kofi Kingston and Xavier Woods, with Big E) and The Usos (Jimmy and Jey Uso) in a triple threat tag team match. In the end, Sheamus hit Woods with a "Brogue Kick" for a pinfall to retain the titles.

After that, Braun Strowman fought Baron Corbin in a Tables, Ladders, and Chairs match. Heath Slater was appointed as referee by Corbin. Corbin made his entrance, ready to win by forfeit if Strowman did not answer the referee's ten-count. Midway through the referee's ten-count, Strowman made his entrance with his arm in a sling. Strowman stated that because it was a TLC match, that also meant that it was no disqualification, and if anyone wanted to assist him, they could. Apollo Crews, Bobby Roode, Chad Gable, and Finn Bálor then appeared, each wielding chairs. Slater removed his referee shirt and attacked Corbin. Crews, Roode, Gable, and Bálor then proceeded to attack Corbin. As Corbin tried to leave the arena, Corbin was intercepted by former Raw General Manager Kurt Angle, who attacked Corbin with a chair. In the climax, Crews, Roode, Gable, Angle, and Bálor performed their respective finishers on Corbin in the ring. Strowman then pinned Corbin for the win, earning a Universal Championship match against Brock Lesnar at the Royal Rumble and stripping Corbin of his authoritative power.

After that, Natalya faced Ruby Riott (accompanied by Liv Morgan and Sarah Logan) in a tables match. Midway through the match, as Natalya attempted to knock Riott off the apron and through a table, Morgan pushed Riott out of the way, thus crashing through the table herself. As Logan attempted to interfere, Natalya performed a body slam on Logan through another table. In the end, Natalya won the match by putting Riott through a table (with an image of Riott on top) with a powerbomb from the top rope.

Next, Finn Bálor fought Drew McIntyre. During the match, Dolph Ziggler emerged from the crowd and performed a superkick on McIntyre. Ziggler obtained a chair only for McIntyre to perform a Claymore kick on Ziggler. In the end, Bálor capitalized on the distraction and performed a "Coup de Grâce" on McIntyre to win the match.

After that, Rey Mysterio faced Randy Orton in a chairs match. Mysterio performed a hurricanrana on Orton to win the match.

In the following match, Ronda Rousey defended the Raw Women's Championship against Nia Jax. In the end, after an evenly contested match, Rousey forced Jax to submit with an armbar to retain the title. Backstage, Jax was then attacked by Becky Lynch as revenge for breaking her nose prior to Survivor Series. Rousey was later interviewed about renewing her rivalry with Charlotte Flair, commenting that "payback's a bitch".

Next, Daniel Bryan defended the WWE Championship against AJ Styles. In the end, Bryan rolled up Styles for a pinfall victory.

In the penultimate match, Seth Rollins defended the Intercontinental Championship against Dean Ambrose. In the climax, as Rollins attempted "The Stomp", Ambrose kicked Rollins and performed "Dirty Deeds" to win his third Intercontinental Championship.

=== Main event ===
In the main event, Becky Lynch defended the SmackDown Women's Championship against Charlotte Flair and Asuka in the first-ever women's triple threat Tables, Ladders, and Chairs match, which was also the first time that the championship was contested in the main event match of a pay-per-view. Early in the match, Asuka powerbombed Flair through a table. Outside the ring, Lynch positioned both Flair and Asuka on a broadcast table and performed a leg drop off a ladder. Asuka barely escaped while Flair took the bulk of the attack. Later, Flair performed a spear on Asuka through the barricade and then put Lynch through a table with a flip. Back in the ring, Flair climbed the ladder to grab the title, but was stopped by Asuka. Flair then set up another ladder. Asuka was knocked off the ladder, while Flair and Lynch continued to trade blows until Ronda Rousey appeared and knocked over the ladder, sending Flair and Lynch to the outside. In the end, Asuka seized the moment, ascended the ladder, and grabbed the title, thus winning her first SmackDown Women's Championship.

== Aftermath ==
=== Raw ===
The McMahon Family (Vince McMahon, Stephanie McMahon, Shane McMahon, and Triple H) opened the following night's Raw, stating the family would now be running both Raw and SmackDown as a unit with no general managers. Baron Corbin confronted the McMahons to have another chance to become the Raw General Manager. Triple H said that if he could defeat Kurt Angle with guest referee Heath Slater, then he could become the Raw General Manager. Mid-match, however, Triple H added Bobby Roode, Chad Gable, and Apollo Crews to make it a 4-on-1 handicap match that Corbin lost, definitively ruling him out of the position.

New Intercontinental Champion Dean Ambrose said Ambrose took the title from Seth Rollins, but would not stop there. Ambrose called out Rollins, who did not appear, and then issued an open challenge for the title, which was answered by Tyler Breeze. After defeating Breeze, Ambrose was attacked by a member of his SWAT team, who revealed himself as Rollins.

Raw Women's Champion Ronda Rousey said she delivered what she promised in regard to her actions at TLC against Nia Jax, Charlotte Flair, and Becky Lynch. Rousey then issued an open challenge. All the women wanted a shot, so Stephanie McMahon scheduled an eight-woman gauntlet match to determine Rousey's challenger for the following week, which was won by Natalya. Natalya, however, lost her championship match to Rousey.

After a backstage confrontation between Finn Bálor and Dolph Ziggler at TLC, a match between the two on the following night's Raw ended in a no-contest after Drew McIntyre interfered and attacked both men. A triple threat match between the three was won by Bálor the following week.

Bobby Lashley and Elias had a rematch on the December 24 episode of Raw in a Miracle on 34th Street Fight match, which was won by Elias.

=== SmackDown ===
Becky Lynch addressed her loss, stating she wanted to face Ronda Rousey for costing her the SmackDown Women's Championship. Charlotte Flair interrupted, saying that Lynch needed to stand in line and if it was not for Ronda Rousey, she would be an eight-time women's champion. New SmackDown Women's Champion Asuka then successfully defended the title against Naomi in an impromptu match. The following week, Lynch defeated Flair and Carmella in a triple threat match to earn a match against Asuka for the title at the Royal Rumble.

WWE Champion Daniel Bryan said he destroyed AJ Styles at TLC along with the Yes Movement. In a subsequent tag team match pitting Bryan and Andrade "Cien" Almas against Styles and Mustafa Ali (who moved over from 205 Live), Bryan was pinned by Ali. The following week, Styles earned another title opportunity against Bryan at the Royal Rumble by winning a fatal five-way match.

=== 205 Live ===
On the December 26 episode of 205 Live, General Manager Drake Maverick scheduled Buddy Murphy to defend the WWE Cruiserweight Championship at the Royal Rumble in a fatal four-way match with his opponents to be decided in qualifying matches.

The 2018 event would be the only TLC event to feature the 205 Live brand, as in September 2019, 205 Live merged under NXT.

== Results ==
No.	Results	Stipulations	Times
1^{P}	Buddy Murphy (c) defeated Cedric Alexander by pinfall	Singles match for the WWE Cruiserweight Championship	10:35
2^{P}	Elias defeated Bobby Lashley (with Lio Rush) by retrieving the guitar	Ladder match A guitar was suspended above the ring and the first to retrieve it was declared the winner.	6:20
3	Fabulous Truth (Carmella and R-Truth) defeated Mahalicia (Alicia Fox and Jinder Mahal) (with The Singh Brothers) by submission	Mixed Match Challenge final Each member of the winning team became the 30th entrant of their respective Royal Rumble matches at the Royal Rumble.	5:50
4	The Bar (Cesaro and Sheamus) (c) defeated The New Day (Kofi Kingston and Xavier Woods) (with Big E) and The Usos (Jimmy Uso and Jey Uso) by pinfall	Triple threat tag team match for the WWE SmackDown Tag Team Championship	12:15
5	Braun Strowman (with Apollo Crews, Bobby Roode, Chad Gable, Kurt Angle, and Finn Bálor (Note: Apollo Crews, Bobby Roode, Chad Gable, Kurt Angle, and Finn Balor wielded the chairs with Braun Strowman.)) defeated Baron Corbin by pinfall	Tables, Ladders, and Chairs match Since Strowman won, he earned a Universal Championship match at the Royal Rumble and Corbin was stripped of all authoritative power. Had Corbin won, he would have become the full-time general manager of Raw.	16:00
6	Natalya defeated Ruby Riott (with Liv Morgan and Sarah Logan)	Tables match	12:40
7	Finn Bálor defeated Drew McIntyre by pinfall	Singles match	12:20
8	Rey Mysterio defeated Randy Orton by pinfall	Chairs match	11:30
9	Ronda Rousey (c) defeated Nia Jax (with Tamina) by submission	Singles match for the WWE Raw Women's Championship	10:50
10	Daniel Bryan (c) defeated AJ Styles by pinfall	Singles match for the WWE Championship	23:55
11	Dean Ambrose defeated Seth Rollins (c) by pinfall	Singles match for the WWE Intercontinental Championship	23:00
12	Asuka defeated Becky Lynch (c) and Charlotte Flair	Triple threat Tables, Ladders, and Chairs match for the WWE SmackDown Women's Championship	21:45
(c) / – the champion(s) heading into the match; P / – the match was broadcast on the pre-show
