= TLC: Tables, Ladders & Chairs (2017) =

WWE pay-per-view and livestreaming event

- Promotional poster featuring The Shield (Roman Reigns, Seth Rollins, and Dean Ambrose)
- Promotion: WWE
- Brand: Raw
- Date: October 22, 2017
- City: Minneapolis, Minnesota
- Venue: Target Center
- Attendance: 13,381

WWE event chronology
← Previous; Hell in a Cell	Next → NXT TakeOver: WarGames

TLC: Tables, Ladders & Chairs chronology
← Previous; 2016	Next → 2018

The 2017 TLC: Tables, Ladders & Chairs was a professional wrestling pay-per-view (PPV) and livestreaming event produced by WWE, held exclusively for wrestlers from the promotion's main roster brand, Raw. It was the ninth annual TLC: Tables, Ladders & Chairs and took place on October 22, 2017, at Target Center in Minneapolis, Minnesota. The concept of the show was based around the primary matches of the card each utilizing tables, ladders, and chairs as legal weapons.

Eight matches were contested at the event, including one on the Kickoff pre-show. Two days prior to the event, Roman Reigns and Bray Wyatt, who were originally scheduled to perform, were removed from the match card due to a viral infection. As a result, two of the matches were changed, one of which became an interpromotional match with a wrestler from the SmackDown brand. The main event was originally scheduled to be The Shield's (Dean Ambrose, Roman Reigns, and Seth Rollins) reunion match, but Reigns was replaced by Raw General Manager Kurt Angle, and they defeated the team of The Miz, Braun Strowman, Kane, Cesaro, and Sheamus in a 5-on-3 handicap Tables, Ladders, and Chairs match. This was Angle's first WWE match in 11 years. Bray Wyatt, in the guise of "Sister Abigail", was originally scheduled to face "The Demon" Finn Bálor, but Wyatt was replaced by SmackDown's AJ Styles, who would lose to "The Demon". The event was also notable for the main roster debut of Asuka, who defeated Emma in the opening bout.

This was the only TLC event held in October, as although the 2018 event was originally planned to again be held in October, it was rescheduled for December due to the scheduling of the all-women's event Evolution for October, with that year's TLC in turn replacing an originally planned Clash of Champions. This was also the final brand-exclusive TLC event, as although the 2018 event was also originally planned to again be held for Raw, brand-exclusive PPV and livestreaming events for the main roster were discontinued following WrestleMania 34 in April that year.

== Production ==
=== Background ===
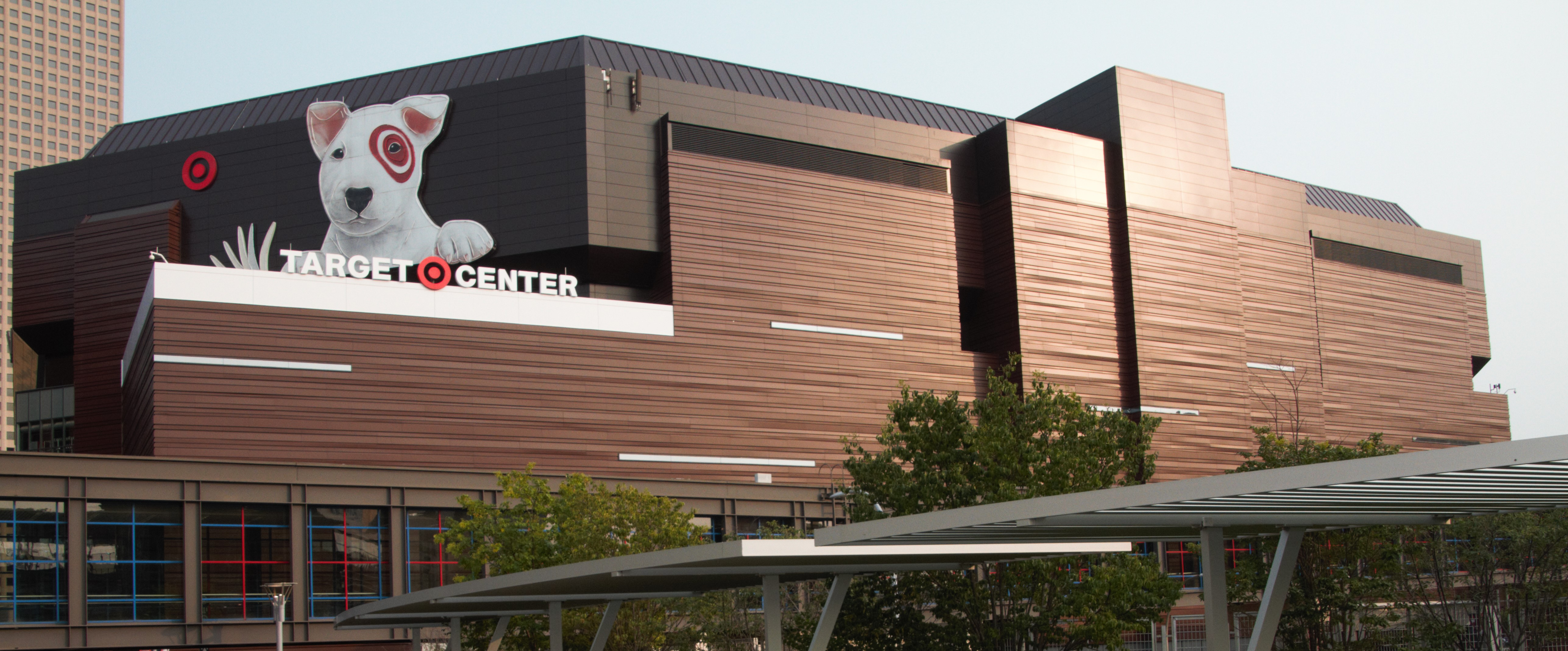
The ninth annual TLC: Tables, Ladders & Chairs was held at the Target Center in Minneapolis, Minnesota.

TLC: Tables, Ladders & Chairs was an annual professional wrestling event previously produced every December by WWE since 2009. It was originally broadcast exclusively via pay-per-view (PPV) before it began simultaneously livestreaming on the WWE Network in 2014. The concept of the event was based on the primary matches of the card each containing a stipulation using tables, ladders, and chairs as legal weapons, with the main event generally being a Tables, Ladders, and Chairs match. Announced on June 19, 2017, the ninth TLC event was moved up from its regular December slot and was instead scheduled for October 22, 2017, at Target Center in Minneapolis, Minnesota. Tickets went on sale on June 23. While the 2016 event was SmackDown-exclusive, the 2017 event exclusively featured wrestlers from the Raw brand.

=== Storylines ===
The event comprised eight matches, including one on the Kickoff pre-show, that resulted from scripted storylines. Results were predetermined by WWE's writers on the Raw brand, while storylines were produced on WWE's weekly television shows, Monday Night Raw and the cruiserweight-exclusive 205 Live. Two days prior to the event, two of the originally scheduled wrestlers were removed from the match card due to a viral infection. As a result, one of those matches featured a wrestler from the SmackDown brand.

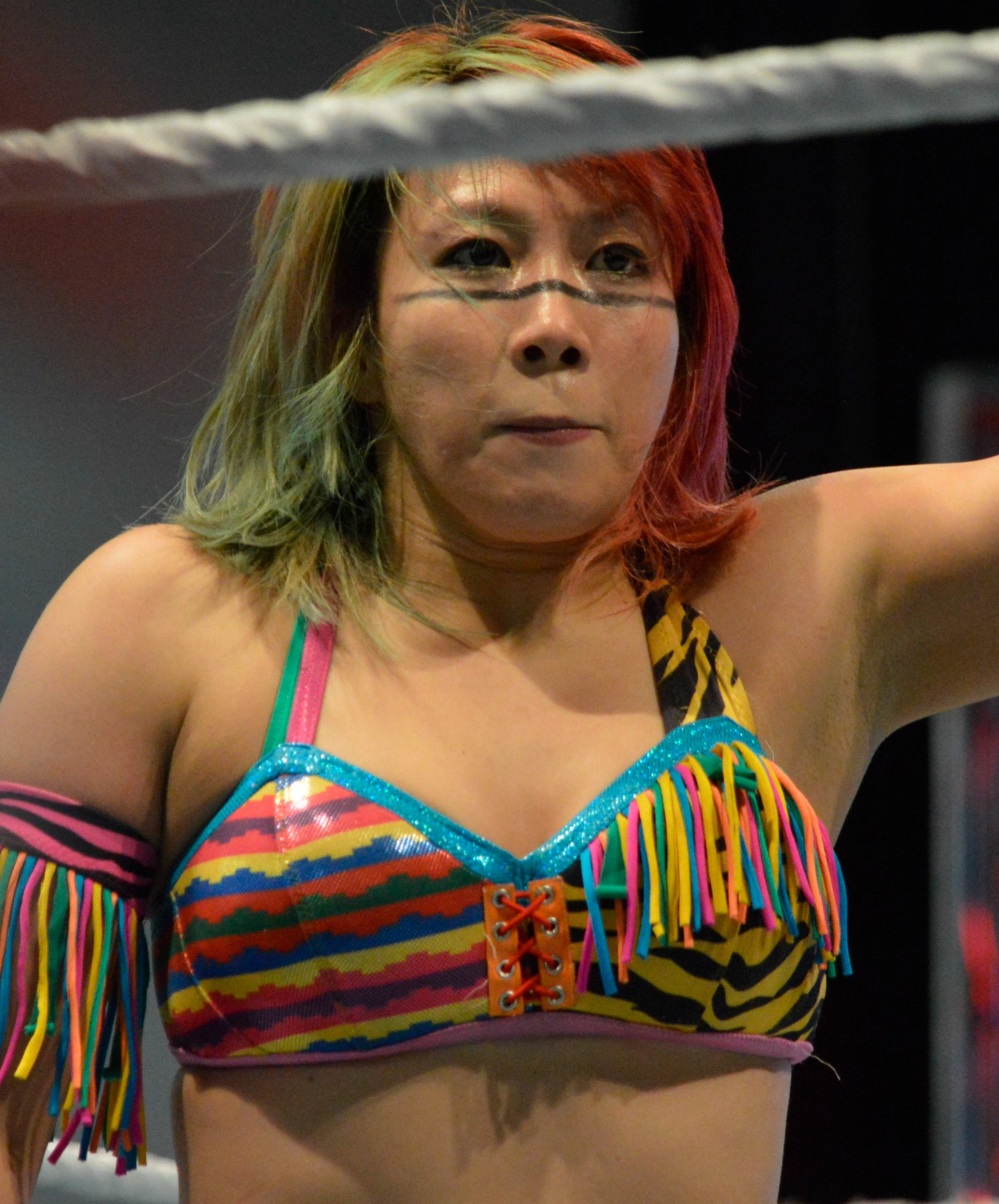
Asuka made her main roster in-ring debut at the event where she defeated Emma.

On the September 11 episode of Raw, it was announced that NXT wrestler Asuka, who had just relinquished the NXT Women's Championship due to injury, was signed to Raw. After her main roster debut was scheduled for TLC, Bayley, Sasha Banks, Alicia Fox, Dana Brooke, and Emma demanded to face her. General Manager Kurt Angle decided that the winner of a fatal five-way elimination match between them would face Asuka at the event; the match was won by Emma. The following week, Emma said she was tired of hearing about Asuka and touted about how she started the women's revolution and beat four of Raw's toughest women to earn her spot against Asuka, Emma then promised that she would force Asuka to get on her knees and thank her for starting the women's revolution.

At No Mercy, Alexa Bliss defeated Bayley, Sasha Banks, Emma, and Nia Jax in a fatal five-way match to retain the Raw Women's Championship. Afterwards on Raw Talk, Bliss insulted Mickie James, calling her an "old lady". The following night on Raw, James challenged Bliss to repeat her comments, and, after Bliss insulted James again, attacked the champion. The following week, James received gifts, including adult diapers and a walker. Wanting to confront Bliss, James found the locker room guarded by Jax, who challenged James to a match. The match ended in Jax being disqualified after Bliss attacked James. General Manager Kurt Angle then booked Bliss to defend the Raw Women's Championship against James at TLC. On the October 9 episode, James said she would become a seven-time WWE women's champion and insulted Bliss' looks, to which Bliss responded with more remarks about James' age. James then chased after Bliss and attacked her, but Bliss escaped. The following week, James and Bayley teamed up to face Bliss and Emma where James pinned Bliss.

On the September 25 episode of Raw, Roman Reigns was the guest on Miz TV for his victory over John Cena at No Mercy. The Miz gloated about retaining the Intercontinental Championship and insulted Reigns' former stable, The Shield, claiming that he and The Miztourage (Curtis Axel and Bo Dallas) could beat The Shield. The two then faced off where Reigns defeated Miz, but Reigns received a beat down. Also at No Mercy, Dean Ambrose and Seth Rollins, also former Shield members, retained the Raw Tag Team Championship against Cesaro and Sheamus. The following week, Cesaro and Sheamus attacked Ambrose and Rollins, following an attack by Braun Strowman, and Reigns defeated Miz by disqualification after Cesaro and Sheamus interfered. The three heels performed The Shield's signature triple powerbomb on Reigns. Before the show ended, Reigns was approached backstage by Ambrose and Rollins. On the October 9 episode, Miz, Cesaro, and Sheamus were interrupted by Reigns, who was then joined by Ambrose and Rollins, officially reuniting The Shield, and the trio attacked Cesaro and Sheamus, and performed a triple powerbomb on Miz. A six-man tag team Tables, Ladders, and Chairs match between The Shield and the team of The Miz, Cesaro, and Sheamus was scheduled for TLC. Later, Strowman attempted to brutalize Matt Hardy, but The Shield stopped Strowman and performed a triple powerbomb on him through the broadcast table. Miz then requested for Strowman to be added to the match at TLC. General Manager Kurt Angle reluctantly agreed, and as a result, made the match a 4-on-3 handicap TLC match. The following week, Ambrose and Rollins retained the Raw Tag Team Championship against Cesaro and Sheamus, and Miz convinced Angle to add a fifth member to his team at TLC. Angle decided that if Strowman beat Reigns in their Steel Cage match, a fifth member could be added, but if Reigns won, Strowman would be off Miz's team. During the steel cage match, Kane returned from a ten-month hiatus by tearing through the ring canvas and chokeslammed Reigns, allowing Strowman to win. Kane was made the fifth member, making it 5-on-3. On October 20, however, WWE announced that Reigns would be unable to compete due to medical issues. Angle, who had been at odds with Miz ever since Miz came to Raw, was made Reigns' replacement, marking Angle's first WWE match since 2006.

At No Mercy, Enzo Amore defeated Neville to win the WWE Cruiserweight Championship. The following night on Raw, at Amore's request, General Manager Kurt Angle signed a no-contact clause; if any cruiserweight attacked Amore, they could not challenge for the championship. Later, Amore's championship celebration was interrupted by the entire cruiserweight division and Neville attacked Amore despite the no-contact clause. Immediately after Raw on the WWE Network, Braun Strowman powerslammed Amore and let the entire cruiserweight division each take a shot at him. On 205 Live, Amore clarified that due to their actions, none of the cruiserweights could challenge him for the title. Neville explained that he knew that he risked his title rematch, but did not care and would do it again. He then faced Ariya Daivari, who befriended Amore, and Neville won by disqualification after Amore attacked Neville with his crutch. The following Raw, Amore was confronted by the cruiserweights, who were led by Neville and surrounded the ring. However, before they could attack Amore, he revealed that Angle signed another no-contact clause, with this one stating that they would be fired. Angle interrupted and backed up both clauses, but introduced Kalisto as the newest member of the cruiserweight division and who would not be affected by either clause as he had joined the division after they had been signed. Kalisto then attacked Amore. The following week on Raw, Angle scheduled Amore to defend the Cruiserweight Championship against Kalisto at TLC. After some remarks from Amore, however, Angle rescheduled the Cruiserweight Championship match for that night and made it a lumberjack match, lifting the second no-contact clause. Kalisto subsequently defeated Amore to win the title. The following night on 205 Live, Amore invoked his rematch clause for TLC and he and Daivari lost to Kalisto and Mustafa Ali.

In the preceding months on 205 Live, Gentleman Jack Gallagher and The Brian Kendrick had been feuding with each other. However, Gallagher assisted Kendrick by attacking Cedric Alexander, aligning himself with Kendrick and beginning a feud between Gallagher and Alexander. On the October 16 episode of Raw, Gallagher and Kendrick were scheduled to face Alexander and Rich Swann at TLC after Alexander defeated Gallagher. The following night on 205 Live, Swann defeated Gallagher after Alexander thwarted Kendrick's attempted interference.

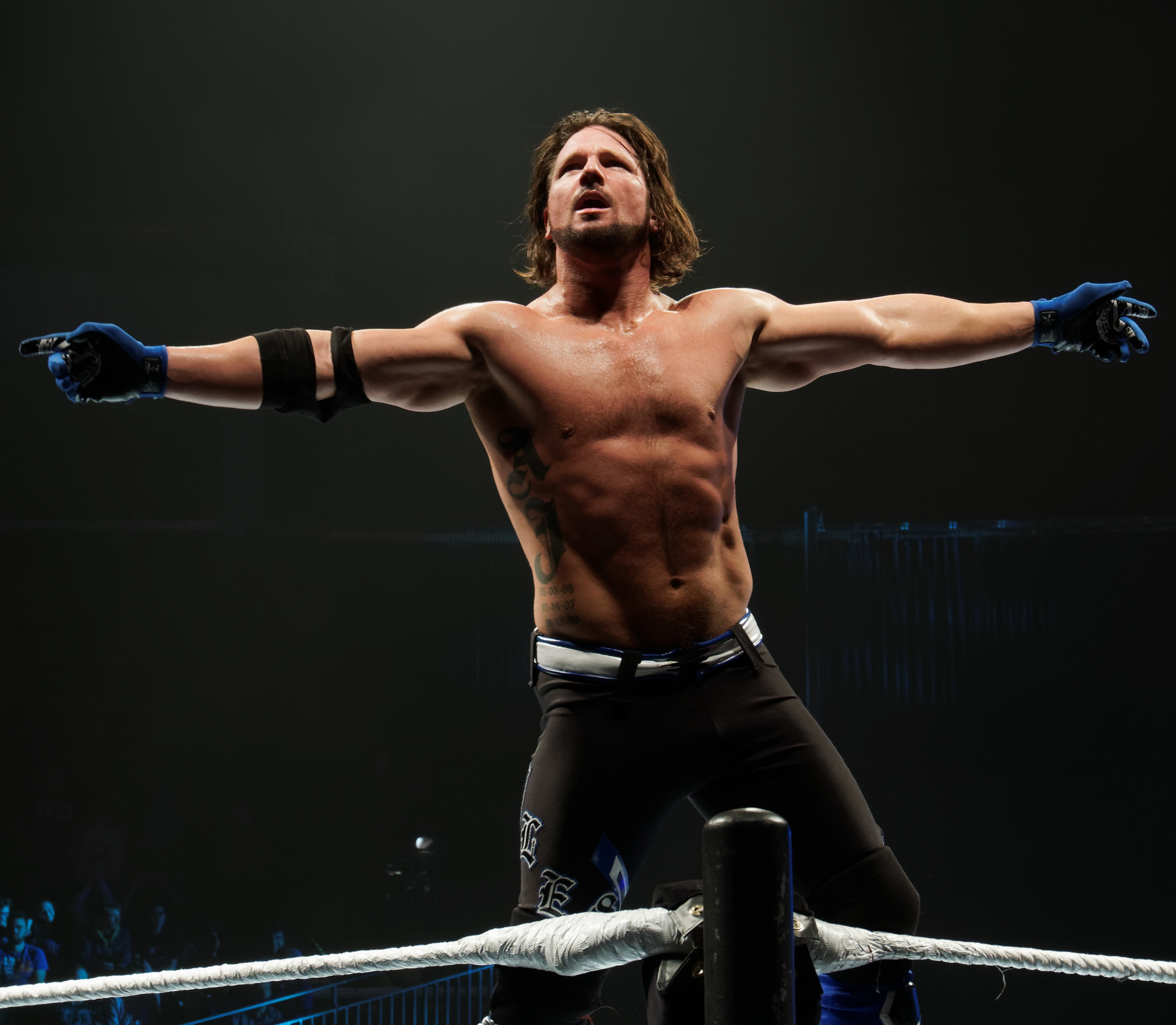
SmackDown's AJ Styles replaced Bray Wyatt at the event and faced "The Demon" Finn Bálor.

At No Mercy, Finn Bálor defeated Bray Wyatt in a man-vs-man match where neither used supernatural powers. The following night on Raw, Bálor was interviewed backstage. He thanked Wyatt for their No Mercy match and said he would now focus on regaining the Universal Championship. However, later in the show, as Bálor stood in the center of the ring celebrating after a match with Goldust, the lights went out and a child began singing Wyatt's song, "He's Got the Whole World in His Hands". The following week, Bálor called Wyatt a coward. Wyatt then appeared on the TitanTron and revealed that despite Randy Orton's actions prior to WrestleMania 33, Sister Abigail was still alive and was "dying" to meet Bálor. Wyatt, embodying Sister Abigail, appeared on the TitanTron, telling Bálor that "she" was going to hurt him because he hurt Wyatt. The following week, Bálor introduced his newly created Demon and a match between "The Demon" and "Sister Abigail" was scheduled for TLC. On October 20, however, due to medical issues, AJ Styles (from the SmackDown brand) replaced Wyatt as The Demon's opponent at TLC with the explanation being that Raw General Manager Kurt Angle contacted SmackDown General Manager Daniel Bryan, who allowed the one-night-only appearance due to the unfortunate circumstances.

On the October 9 episode of Raw, Sasha Banks eliminated Alicia Fox by submission from the fatal five-way elimination match that determined Asuka's TLC opponent. The following week, Fox wanted a match against Banks, claiming that she did not tap out and that the referee made a wrong call. Fox was granted the match, but again lost to Banks by submission. Afterwards backstage, Fox attacked Banks and shoved a referee. Fox was fined for shoving the referee and was scheduled to face Banks in a rematch on the TLC Kickoff pre-show.

== Event ==
Other on-screen personnel
Role:	Name:
English commentators	Michael Cole
English commentators	Corey Graves
English commentators	Booker T
English commentators	Vic Joseph (Cruiserweight matches)
English commentators	Nigel McGuinness (Cruiserweight matches)
Spanish commentators	Carlos Cabrera
Spanish commentators	Marcelo Rodríguez
German commentators	Carsten Schaefer
German commentators	Tim Haber
German commentators	Calvin Knie
Ring announcer	Mike Rome
Referees	Shawn Bennett
Referees	John Cone
Referees	Darrick Moore
Referees	Chad Patton
Referees	Rod Zapata
Interviewers	Charly Caruso
Interviewers	Kayla Braxton
Pre-show panel	Renee Young
Pre-show panel	Peter Rosenberg
Pre-show panel	David Otunga
"Raw Talk" panel	Renee Young
"Raw Talk" panel	Peter Rosenberg

=== Pre-show ===
During the TLC: Tables, Ladders & Chairs Kickoff pre-show, Sasha Banks faced Alicia Fox. Banks forced Fox to submit to the "Bank Statement" to win the match.

=== Preliminary matches ===
The actual pay-per-view opened with the main roster in-ring debut of Asuka, who faced Emma. Asuka forced Emma to submit to the "Asuka Lock" for the win.

Next, Cedric Alexander and Rich Swann faced Gentleman Jack Gallagher and The Brian Kendrick. Alexander performed a "Lumbar Check" on Kendrick to score the win.

After that, Alexa Bliss defended the Raw Women's Championship against Mickie James. In the climax, Bliss performed a snap DDT on James to retain the title. After the match, James was interviewed, saying that she was far from done.

In the fourth match, Kalisto defended the WWE Cruiserweight Championship against Enzo Amore. In the climax, Amore poked the eye of Kalisto while the referee was distracted and executed a "JawdonZO" on Kalisto to win the title for a record-tying second time. After the match, Amore was interviewed in the ring and said that WWE's fans did not deserve a thank you.

Next, "The Demon" Finn Bálor faced SmackDown's AJ Styles. Styles performed a Phenomenal Forearm for a nearfall. Bálor performed a 1916 for a nearfall. In the end, Bálor performed the "Coup de Grace" on Styles for the win. After the match, the two showed mutual respect and gestured the "Too Sweet" hand symbol to each other.

In the penultimate match, Jason Jordan faced Elias in an impromptu match. Throughout the night, Jordan kept interrupting Elias as he tried playing his guitar for the live audience by throwing vegetables at him. Their impromptu match ended when Jordan pinned Elias with a roll up to win.

=== Main event ===
In the main event, Dean Ambrose and Seth Rollins teamed with Kurt Angle in Angle's first WWE match in 11 years, who performed The Shield's entrance along with Ambrose and Rollins and wore The Shield's gear; they faced The Miz, Cesaro, Sheamus, Braun Strowman, and Kane in a 5-on-3 handicap Tables, Ladders, and Chairs match. Early in the match, Rollins performed a frog splash off a ladder through an announce table on Strowman whilst Ambrose performed a diving elbow drop, also off a ladder through an announce table, on Kane. Angle applied the ankle lock on Kane, but Strowman attacked Angle. Strowman performed a running powerslam on Angle through a table, prompting medical personnel to escort Angle backstage. After being dominated by Miz, Cesaro, Sheamus, Strowman, and Kane, Ambrose and Rollins fought back and attacked the five. Kane accidentally struck Strowman with a chair, leading to Strowman confronting Kane. Cesaro and Sheamus performed a double crucifix powerbomb on Ambrose onto a table, which did not break, and then Strowman threw Ambrose through the table. After Miz called for a garbage truck to be brought out by the stage, Miz, Cesaro, Sheamus, Strowman, and Kane attempted to throw Ambrose and Rollins into the truck, but Ambrose and Rollins fought back and dove off the truck onto Cesaro, Sheamus, Strowman, and Kane. Kane then attacked Strowman with a chokeslam through the stage and buried Strowman underneath a pile of chairs. Kane performed a double chokeslam on Ambrose and Rollins through two tables. Strowman recovered and attacked Kane, Cesaro, Sheamus, and Miz until the four incapacitated Strowman and threw him into the garbage truck. Miz then signaled for the truck to drive away, thus removing Strowman from the rest of the match. As Ambrose and Rollins were being dominated, Angle returned and performed an "Angle Slam" on Sheamus on the entrance ramp and performed another "Angle Slam" on Cesaro through a table. Ambrose and Rollins tackled Kane through the barricade. Whilst distracted, Miz performed a "Skull Crushing Finale" on Angle for a near-fall. Angle then applied the ankle lock on Miz, who escaped. Rollins performed a "Ripcord Knee" on Miz, which was followed by "Dirty Deeds" from Ambrose, and an "Angle Slam" from Angle. Ambrose, Rollins, and Angle then performed The Shield's triple powerbomb on Miz, with Angle pinning Miz to win the match.

== Reception ==
Despite the medical issues forcing Roman Reigns and Bray Wyatt to pull out of the show, WWE was commended for its response before the show started, with Dave Meltzer of the Wrestling Observer Newsletter saying the company went "above and beyond for fans under trying circumstances".

== Aftermath ==
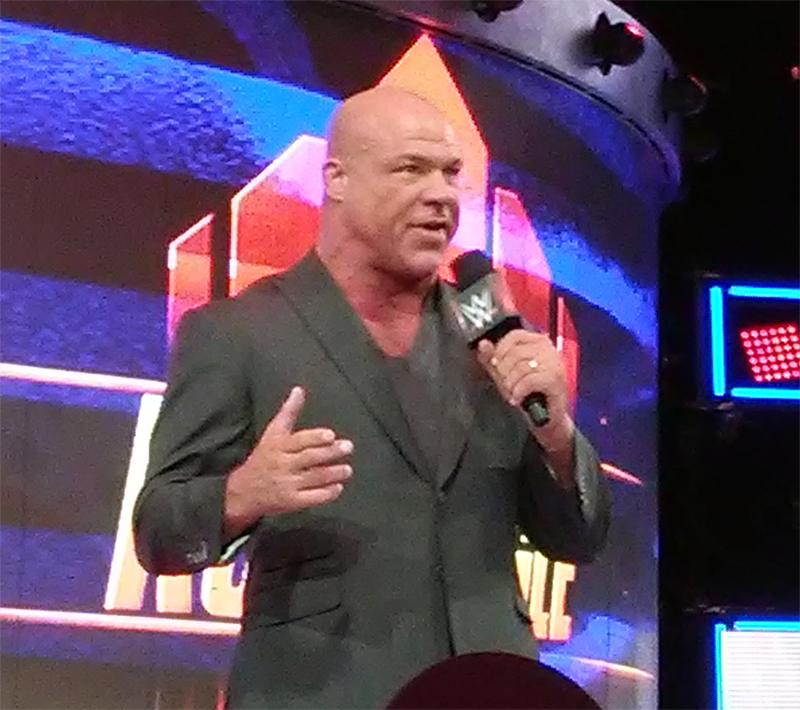
Kurt Angle, who was serving as the on-screen general manager of Raw, replaced Roman Reigns in the main event, which was his first WWE match since 2006.

The following night on Raw, Raw General Manager Kurt Angle first addressed his TLC match, where he stated that he wrote a new chapter in his career. He then shifted his focus to Survivor Series and said that like last year, the event would be Raw versus SmackDown, and Angle proceeded to announce the match card where all of Raw's champions would face their counterpart of the SmackDown brand in non-title matches, with the exception of the WWE Cruiserweight Championship, as it does not have a SmackDown counterpart. He also announced that there would be two traditional Survivor Series elimination matches, one 5-on-5 male match and one 5-on-5 female match, from opening to the end of Raw, Shane McMahon lead a "Under siege" invasion with the SmackDown Superstars and a "Mock Invasion" led by The New Day (Kofi Kingston, Big E, and Xavier Woods) in early November.

Although TLC was supposed to be a one-night-only appearance for SmackDown's AJ Styles, he appeared the next night on Raw and teamed with Dean Ambrose and Seth Rollins, where they defeated the team of The Miz, Cesaro, and Sheamus. Kane came out and interrupted their celebration and he, Cesaro, and Sheamus cleared the ring. Kane then addressed his attack on Braun Strowman. He said that he had heard about how powerful Strowman was and wanted to see it for himself, but was not impressed, and that was why he turned on him during the TLC match. Kane said that with Strowman gone, he wanted competition, which was accepted by Finn Bálor, who Kane defeated. Strowman, however, returned the following week and viciously attacked The Miz and The Miztourage (Bo Dallas and Curtis Axel).

In the women's division, Emma had a rematch with Asuka, but again lost, continuing Asuka's undefeated streak. This would be Emma's final match before her initial release from WWE on October 29. She made her return five years later on the October 28, 2022, episode of SmackDown, but was again released among several other WWE staff in September 2023.

Also in the women's division, Raw Women's Champion Alexa Bliss gloated about retaining her title against Mickie James, who confronted Bliss and performed a DDT on her. The two had a rematch the following week where Bliss again retained. Alicia Fox and Sasha Banks were involved in a triple threat match with Bayley to determine Team Raw's captain for the women's team at Survivor Series, which was won by Fox.

Elias had a rematch with Jason Jordan, where Jordan won by disqualification after Elias attacked him with his guitar.

In the cruiserweight division, Kalisto invoked his rematch for the WWE Cruiserweight Championship on the following episode of 205 Live, but Enzo Amore retained by disqualification after he attacked the referee, and Kalisto attacked Amore after the match. Also on the following 205 Live, after Cedric Alexander and Rich Swann defeated the team of Noam Dar and Tony Nese, they were confronted by Gentleman Jack Gallagher and The Brian Kendrick. The two complemented Alexander, but said that Swann was holding him back. They gave Alexander the option to join them and allowed him one week to make a decision, while also stating that they would be coming after Swann the following week. Alexander turned down their offer and Swann defeated Kendrick.

The 2017 TLC event would be the final to be brand-exclusive, as although the 2018 event was originally planned to again be held for Raw, WWE discontinued brand-exclusive PPV and livestreaming events following WrestleMania 34 in April that year. Due to the scheduling of the all-women's event Evolution for October 2018, TLC was moved back to its usual December slot, replacing an originally planned Clash of Champions.

== Results ==
No.	Results	Stipulations	Times
1^{P}	Sasha Banks defeated Alicia Fox by submission	Singles match	11:00
2	Asuka defeated Emma by submission	Singles match	9:25
3	Rich Swann and Cedric Alexander defeated Gentleman Jack Gallagher and The Brian Kendrick by pinfall	Tag team match	8:00
4	Alexa Bliss (c) defeated Mickie James by pinfall	Singles match for the WWE Raw Women's Championship	11:25
5	Enzo Amore defeated Kalisto (c) by pinfall	Singles match for the WWE Cruiserweight Championship	8:45
6	"The Demon" Finn Bálor defeated AJ Styles by pinfall	Singles match	18:20
7	Jason Jordan defeated Elias by pinfall	Singles match	8:50
8	Kurt Angle and The Shield (Seth Rollins and Dean Ambrose) defeated Braun Strowman, The Miz, Kane and The Bar (Cesaro and Sheamus) by pinfall	3-on-5 Handicap Tag Team Tables, Ladders, and Chairs match	35:25
(c) / – the champion(s) heading into the match; P / – the match was broadcast on the pre-show
