= WWE Mixed Match Challenge =

WWE tournament and Facebook Watch program

- Genre: Sports entertainment; Professional wrestling
- Created by: Vince McMahon
- Opening theme: "One Chance [Rock Version]" by CFO$
- Country of origin: United States
- No. of seasons: 2
- No. of episodes: 25

Production
- Camera setup: Multi-camera
- Running time: 20-25 minutes (first season); 30 minutes (second season)
- Production company: WWE

Original release
- Network: Facebook Watch; WWE Network
- Release: January 16 – December 16, 2018

WWE Mixed Match Challenge, also known simply as Mixed Match Challenge, is a seasonal professional wrestling web and streaming television series and tournament that was produced by WWE, where all matches are mixed tag team matches. Like all professional wrestling events, it is based on scripted storylines and its outcomes are predetermined. The 12-episode first season premiered on January 16, 2018 on Facebook Watch. Each episode was 20–25 minutes in length and featured one match. The show filled WWE's 10:00pm ET timeslot previously held by 205 Live. Following the show's premiere, 205 Live began to air at 10:20pm ET. On September 4, 2018, WWE announced a second season of Mixed Match Challenge, with the season premiering on September 18 immediately following SmackDown Live. Season 2 consisted of 13 30-minute episodes, with each featuring two matches. Episodes of season 2 aired at 10:00pm ET, with a weekly pre-show that started at 9:50pm ET.

== Season 1 ==
The teams, which were made up of both male and female wrestlers from both the Raw and SmackDown brands, were picked by their respective general managers, Kurt Angle and Daniel Bryan. Each team wrestled for the chance to give $100,000 to a charity of the winner's choice, while all other charities received $10,000 each. During the second episode, Angle and Bryan announced that the first week of Mixed Match Challenge received 35 million total engagements. The Miz and Asuka won the inaugural Mixed Match Challenge tournament, earning the $100,000 for the Rescue Dogs Rock charity. Enzo Amore was originally supposed to take part, but was replaced with Apollo Crews after catching the flu. Samoa Joe was originally Bayley's tag team partner after winning a fan vote, but was injured and replaced by Elias, who finished second in the fan vote. Alicia Fox suffered a broken tailbone and was replaced by Mandy Rose. Big E became the partner for Carmella after winning a fan vote between all three members of The New Day.

=== Teams ===
Raw
Teams	Charities
Team Little Big (Braun Strowman and Alexa Bliss)	Connor's Cure
Boss Club (Finn Bálor and Sasha Banks)	Special Olympics
Apollo and Nia Jax	Susan G. Komen
Awe-ska (The Miz and Asuka)	Rescue Dogs Rock
Rose Gold (Mandy Rose and Goldust)	Hire Heroes USA
Elias and Bayley	Americares

SmackDown
Teams	Charities
Robe Warriors (Bobby Roode and Charlotte Flair)	Girl Up
Ravishing Rusev Day (Rusev and Lana)	Global Citizen
Glowing Since DAY ONE ISH (Jimmy Uso and Naomi)	Boys & Girls Clubs of America
Shinsuke Nakamura and Natalya	Make-A-Wish
The Ginger Snaps (Sami Zayn and Becky Lynch)	UNICEF
Big E and Carmella	KaBOOM!

=== Bracket ===
The full tournament bracket was revealed on January 11, 2018 on WWE.com. In one of the semifinal matches, fans were able to vote on a Facebook poll, for an eliminated team to be given a second chance in the tournament.

1st Round; Weeks 1-6
Raw	Boss Club (Finn Bálor and Sasha Banks)	Submission
SmackDown	Shinsuke Nakamura and Natalya	12:48
Raw	Awe-ska (The Miz and Asuka)	Submission
SmackDown	Big E and Carmella	9:49
Raw	Team Little Big (Braun Strowman and Alexa Bliss)	Pinfall
SmackDown	The Ginger Snaps (Sami Zayn and Becky Lynch)	11:15
Raw	Rose Gold (Goldust and Mandy Rose)	10:14 (Note: Daniel Bryan was the special guest referee for this match after winning a fan vote.)
SmackDown	Glowing Since DAY ONE ISH (Jimmy Uso and Naomi)	Pinfall
Raw	Elias and Bayley	9:38
SmackDown	Ravishing Rusev Day (Rusev and Lana)	Pinfall
Raw	Apollo and Nia Jax	10:39
SmackDown	Robe Warriors (Bobby Roode and Charlotte Flair)	Pinfall

Quarterfinals; Weeks 7-9
Raw	Boss Club	12:45
Raw	Awe-ska	Pinfall
Raw	Team Little Big	Pinfall
SmackDown	Glowing Since DAY ONE ISH	10:35
SmackDown	Ravishing Rusev Day	11:02
SmackDown	Robe Warriors	Pinfall

Semifinals; Weeks 10-11
Raw	Awe-ska	Submission
Raw	Team Little Big	11:20
SmackDown	Robe Warriors (Bobby Roode and Becky Lynch (Note: Becky Lynch replaced Charlotte Flair in the semifinals after Flair had dental surgery.))	Pinfall
Raw	Boss Club (Note: Boss Club (Finn Bálor and Sasha Banks) won a Second Chance poll, earning 40% of the votes to re-enter the tournament.)	13:03

Final; Week 12
Raw	Awe-ska	Pinfall
SmackDown	Robe Warriors (Bobby Roode and Charlotte Flair)	20:00

=== Broadcast team ===
Ring name	Role
Renee Young	Co-host
Byron Saxton	Co-host
Greg Hamilton	Ring announcer
Michael Cole	Lead commentator
Corey Graves	Color commentator
Beth Phoenix	Color commentator Hall of Famer

== Season 2 ==
The second season premiered on September 18, 2018 on Facebook Watch. In the second season, teams competed in a round robin-style tournament throughout the fourteen 30-minute, two match episodes, in order to qualify for the playoffs. The final of season two took place at the TLC: Tables, Ladders & Chairs pay-per-view event on December 16, where the winning team would enter the Royal Rumble at number 30 for their respective Royal Rumble matches and an all-expense-paid trip to anywhere in the world.

During the tournament, several wrestlers were replaced due to injuries or storyline related reasons. Alexa Bliss was originally supposed to take part in the tournament again alongside her partner, Braun Strowman, however, due to an arm injury, Ember Moon replaced Bliss. Mickie James replaced Sasha Banks as Lashley's partner. Kevin Owens was also originally partnered with Natalya, but he was replaced by Bobby Roode after a surgery in both knees. On November 13, 2018, SmackDown General Manager Paige announced that AJ Styles was not going to compete on that night's episode of Mixed Match Challenge following his controversial WWE Championship loss to Daniel Bryan on SmackDown Live, being substituted by Jeff Hardy. It was announced that Strowman was unable to compete in the Mixed Match Challenge playoffs after an elbow injury and was replaced by Curt Hawkins. On December 10, 2018, it was announced that Bálor was unable to compete in the Mixed Match Challenge semi-finals, being substituted by Apollo Crews.

=== Teams ===
Replacement member

Raw
Teams	Members	
The Monster Eclipse	Ember Moon	
The Monster Eclipse	Braun Strowman	Curt Hawkins (Note: Curt Hawkins replaced Braun Strowman in the playoffs after Strowman suffered an elbow injury.)
Country Dominance	Mickie James	
Country Dominance	Bobby Lashley	
B'N'B	Bayley	
B'N'B	Finn Bálor	Apollo Crews (Note: Apollo Crews replaced Finn Bálor in the playoffs after Bálor suffered an injury.)
Manhalicia	Alicia Fox	
Manhalicia	Jinder Mahal	
Team Pawz	Natalya	
Team Pawz	Kevin Owens	Bobby Roode (Note: Bobby Roode replaced Kevin Owens after Owens suffered a knee injury.)

SmackDown
Teams	Members	
Awe-ska	Asuka	
Awe-ska	The Miz	
Day One Glow	Naomi	
Day One Glow	Jimmy Uso	
Ravishing Rusev Day	Lana	
Ravishing Rusev Day	Rusev	
Phenomenal Flair	Charlotte Flair	
Phenomenal Flair	AJ Styles	Jeff Hardy (Note: Jeff Hardy replaced AJ Styles after SmackDown General Manager Paige announced that Styles will not compete in the Mixed Match Challenge after losing the WWE Championship to Daniel Bryan earlier that night.)
The Fabulous Truth	Carmella	
The Fabulous Truth	R-Truth	

=== Results ===
Advanced to next round
Won match
Lost match

Raw bracket
Teams	Opponents				
Teams	The Monster Eclipse	Country Dominance	B'N'B	Mahalicia	Team Pawz
The Monster Eclipse	—N/a	November 13, 2018	October 9, 2018	October 30, 2018	September 18, 2018
Country Dominance	November 13, 2018	—N/a	November 6, 2018	September 25, 2018	October 16, 2018
B'N'B	October 9, 2018	November 6, 2018	—N/a	October 2, 2018	October 23, 2018
Mahalicia	October 30, 2018	September 25, 2018	October 2, 2018	—N/a	November 20, 2018
Team Pawz	September 18, 2018	October 16, 2018	October 23, 2018	November 20, 2018	—N/a

SmackDown bracket
Teams	Opponents				
Teams	Awe-ska	Day One Glow	Ravishing Rusev Day	Phenomenal Flair	The Fabulous Truth
Awe-ska	—N/a	October 23, 2018	October 16, 2018	November 13, 2018	September 25, 2018
Day One Glow	October 23, 2018	—N/a	October 2, 2018	September 18, 2018	November 6, 2018
Ravishing Rusev Day	October 16, 2018	October 2, 2018	—N/a	October 30, 2018	November 20, 2018
Phenomenal Flair	November 13, 2018	September 18, 2018	October 30, 2018	—N/a	October 9, 2018
The Fabulous Truth	September 25, 2018	November 6, 2018	November 20, 2018	October 9, 2018	—N/a

Overall standings
Raw		SmackDown	
The Monster Eclipse (Ember Moon and Braun Strowman)	4-0	Phenomenal Flair (Charlotte Flair and AJ Styles/Jeff Hardy)	4-0
Country Dominance (Mickie James and Bobby Lashley)	3-1	Awe-ska (Asuka and The Miz)	3-1
B'N'B (Bayley and Finn Bálor)	2-2	Day One Glow (Naomi and Jimmy Uso)	2-2
Mahalicia (Alicia Fox and Jinder Mahal)	1-3	The Fabulous Truth (Carmella and R-Truth)	1-3
Team Pawz (Natalya and Kevin Owens/Bobby Roode)	0-4	Ravishing Rusev Day (Lana and Rusev)	0-4

==== Playoffs ====
Quarterfinals; Mixed Match Challenge; November 27 – December 4, 2018
1	The Monster Eclipse (Ember Moon and Curt Hawkins)	8:15
4	Mahalicia (Alicia Fox and Jinder Mahal)	Pinfall
Raw
2	Country Dominance (Mickie James and Bobby Lashley)	9:45
3	B'N'B (Bayley and Finn Bálor)	Pinfall
1	Phenomenal Flair (Charlotte Flair and Jeff Hardy)	6:50
4	The Fabulous Truth (Carmella and R-Truth)	Pinfall
SmackDown
2	Awe-ska (Asuka and The Miz)	Submission
3	Day One Glow (Naomi and Jimmy Uso)	8:47

Semifinals; Mixed Match Challenge; December 11, 2018
4	Mahalicia	Pinfall
3	B'N'B (Bayley and Apollo Crews)	9:45
4	The Fabulous Truth	Pinfall
2	Awe-ska	11:35

Final; TLC: Tables, Ladders & Chairs; December 16, 2018
4	Mahalicia	5:50
4	The Fabulous Truth	Submission

=== Aftermath ===
R-Truth and Carmella won the final of Mixed Match Challenge Season 2, earning themselves the #30 spots in the 2019 Royal Rumble matches and an all-expenses-paid vacation, which R-Truth chose to be the WWE headquarters in Stamford, Connecticut. At the Royal Rumble event, Carmella (along with Bayley) eliminated Alexa Bliss from the Women's Rumble match before getting eliminated by eventual runner up Charlotte Flair. R-Truth however did not participate in the Men's Royal Rumble match, as he was attacked by Nia Jax (who took the #30 spot) during his entrance. As a consolation prize for having his spot stolen, he was awarded a WWE United States Championship match against new champion Shinsuke Nakamura on the January 29, 2019 episode of SmackDown, which he won becoming a two-time champion.

=== Broadcast team ===
Ring name	Notes
Kayla Braxton	Pre-show co-host
Vic Joseph	Pre-show co-host Color commentator
Mike Rome	Ring announcer
Renee Young	Color commentator
Michael Cole	Lead commentator

== Awards and nominations ==
Year	Award	Category	Nominee(s)	Result	Ref.
2018	8th Streamy Awards	Subject – Sports	WWE Mixed Match Challenge	Nominated	
2018	6th Cynopsis Model D Awards	Best Sports-Related Live Series or Event	WWE Mixed Match Challenge	Won	
