= WWE Evolution =

Women's professional wrestling pay-per-view and livestreaming event series

- WWE Evolution 2025 logo
- Promotions: WWE
- Brand(s): Raw (2018, 2025–present); SmackDown (2018, 2025–present); NXT (2018, 2025–present); NXT UK (2018)
- First event: 2018
- Event gimmick: Women's professional wrestling

WWE Evolution is a periodic women's professional wrestling pay-per-view (PPV) and livestreaming event produced by WWE. It is the company's only PPV and livestreaming event to consist solely of women's matches. The inaugural event was held in October 2018, and after years of rumors and speculation, a second event was held in July 2025. In addition to wrestlers from the promotion's Raw, SmackDown, and NXT brand divisions, the inaugural event also saw involvement of wrestlers from the now-defunct NXT UK brand and also hosted the finals of the 2018 Mae Young Classic.

== History ==
On the July 23, 2018, episode of Monday Night Raw, WWE executive Stephanie McMahon announced that for the first time, WWE would hold an all-women's professional wrestling pay-per-view (PPV) and livestreaming event titled Evolution. It was scheduled to take place on October 28, 2018, at the Nassau Veterans Memorial Coliseum in Uniondale, New York, replacing the previously planned Clash of Champions. WWE Hall of Famers Lita, Trish Stratus, and Beth Phoenix were advertised as taking part in the event. It was also announced that the event would host the final of the 2018 Mae Young Classic and that all four of WWE's women's championships at the time for the Raw, SmackDown, NXT, and NXT UK brand divisions would be defended; however, the NXT UK Women's Championship match was later removed from the main card and occurred as a dark match before the show.

WWE's executive vice president Paul "Triple H" Levesque explained that WWE's female performers "deserve[d] the opportunity" for a prominent showcase, and that it "was simply the right time for this to happen". He denied that the event was intended to be as a counterpoint for Crown Jewel—a subsequent major event days later in Saudi Arabia that, per the country's women's rights policies, would not include WWE's female performers at the time.

Over the next few years, there were various comments from people within WWE on a potential second Evolution event, with support from a number of WWE female performers. In a December 2019 interview with Talksport, Stephanie McMahon stated: "I'm hopeful to have an announcement on an Evolution 2, but there is nothing official to announce just yet". A report by Alex McCarthy of Sportskeeda in July 2020 stated that a second Evolution event was seen a "no brainer", with female talent pushing for it internally and tentative plans being made for the end of the year. In December 2020, Trish Stratus suggested that she had begun training for the rumored event, but that she had received no call from WWE, with no event taking place.

Before Mickie James's release from WWE in April 2021, she had pushed for the company to produce another all-female event as well as an all-female brand, but said she was "cut off at every opportunity". She claimed an unnamed WWE official told her that "women's wrestling doesn't make money" and that Evolution was the company's "lowest-rated pay-per-view ever in the history of WWE pay-per-views". However, James rebuked this by saying the event was set up to fail, only being promoted on WWE programming a month prior to the event, with matches being announced a week or two before. Other WWE female performers, notably Sasha Banks, were also vocal in support of another all-female event.

In June 2021, former WWE wrestler Maria Kanellis also stated that former Head of WWE Talent Relations, Mark Carano, informed her that there would not be another all-female event. Dave Meltzer stated on Wrestling Observer Radio that while Evolution was not a commercial failure for WWE, and not the worst performing event of the year, it was still on the lower end of ticket sales despite its heavy marketing push compared to those similar to its size. Glenn Rubenstein of Wrestling Inc. reported that 90% of the seats were filled in the arena despite the reported sell-out. Prior to the announcement of the match between Nikki Bella and Ronda Rousey, which saw a surge in ticket sales, WWE had sold 7,000 tickets, with 3,000 of those tickets belonging to scalpers.

In a conference call for June 2021's NXT TakeOver: In Your House event, Triple H was questioned on if WWE would ever hold another all-female event. He said it was possible, "but it's not a must-have at the moment". He also found it odd that people thought that doing more all-female events would mean equality for the women's division, but cited the contradiction in that WWE would be criticized if they would run an all-male event; essentially, separate does not mean equal.

After another few years, a report emerged on March 6, 2025, that WWE were in fact planning to hold a second Evolution event. Bodyslam.net stated that the company were aiming to hold the event on July 5, 2025, at the Mohegan Sun Arena in Uncasville, Connecticut, but noted that while the event was in the works, the schedule was tentative. On May 12, 2025, a new report from PWInsider stated that the company was now looking to hold the event a week later from Atlanta, Georgia during the same weekend as Saturday Night's Main Event XL. WWE then confirmed this with an announcement during Saturday Night's Main Event XXXIX on May 24, with the second Evolution event scheduled for Sunday, July 13 at Atlanta's State Farm Arena with Saturday Night's Main Event XL held the day before at the same venue. Unlike 2018, the 2025 Evolution featured wrestlers from Raw, SmackDown, and NXT, as NXT UK was dissolved in 2022.

== Events ==
#	Event	Date	City	Venue	Main event	Battle Royal winner	Ref.
1	WWE Evolution (2018)	October 28, 2018	Uniondale, New York	Nassau Veterans Memorial Coliseum	Ronda Rousey (c) vs. Nikki Bella for the WWE Raw Women's Championship	Nia Jax	
2	WWE Evolution (2025)	July 13, 2025	Atlanta, Georgia	State Farm Arena	Iyo Sky (c) vs. Rhea Ripley vs. Naomi for the Women's World Championship (Note: The match originally started as a singles match between Sky and Ripley, but Naomi cashed in during the match to make it a triple threat match.); This was Naomi's Money in the Bank cash-in match.	Stephanie Vaquer	
(c) – refers to the champion(s) heading into the match

== External like ==
- Official Evolution website
