= WWE Evolution (2018) =

Women's professional wrestling pay-per-view and livestreaming event

Evolution
- Promotional poster featuring various WWE wrestlers
- Promotion: WWE
- Brand(s): Raw; SmackDown; NXT; NXT UK
- Date: October 28, 2018
- City: Uniondale, New York
- Venue: Nassau Coliseum
- Attendance: 10,900
- Tagline: WWE's First-Ever All-Women's Event

WWE event chronology
← Previous; Super Show-Down	Next → Crown Jewel

Evolution chronology
← Previous; First	Next → 2025

The 2018 Evolution was a women's professional wrestling pay-per-view (PPV) and livestreaming event produced by WWE. It was the inaugural Evolution and was held exclusively for women from WWE's main roster brands, Raw and SmackDown, and developmental brands, NXT and NXT UK. The event took place on October 28, 2018, at the Nassau Veterans Memorial Coliseum in Uniondale, New York. This was WWE's only PPV and livestreaming event to consist solely of women's matches until 2025.

The main card consisted of seven matches. Three of WWE's then-four women's championships were defended on the main card; the fourth was defended in a dark match before the event. It also featured the final of the 2018 Mae Young Classic tournament. In the main event, Ronda Rousey defeated Nikki Bella by submission to retain the Raw Women's Championship. In the penultimate match, Becky Lynch defeated Charlotte Flair in a Last Woman Standing match to retain the SmackDown Women's Championship. In other prominent matches, Toni Storm defeated Io Shirai to win the 2018 Mae Young Classic, and Shayna Baszler defeated Kairi Sane to become the first two-time NXT Women's Champion.

The event's scheduling caused the cancellation of an originally planned Clash of Champions for 2018. WWE's original schedule for the year had TLC: Tables, Ladders & Chairs on October 21 and Clash of Champions on December 16. With Evolution being scheduled for October 28, TLC was pushed back and replaced Clash of Champions on its originally scheduled date and location, with Clash of Champions canceled for 2018, but it returned in 2019.

== Production ==
=== Background ===
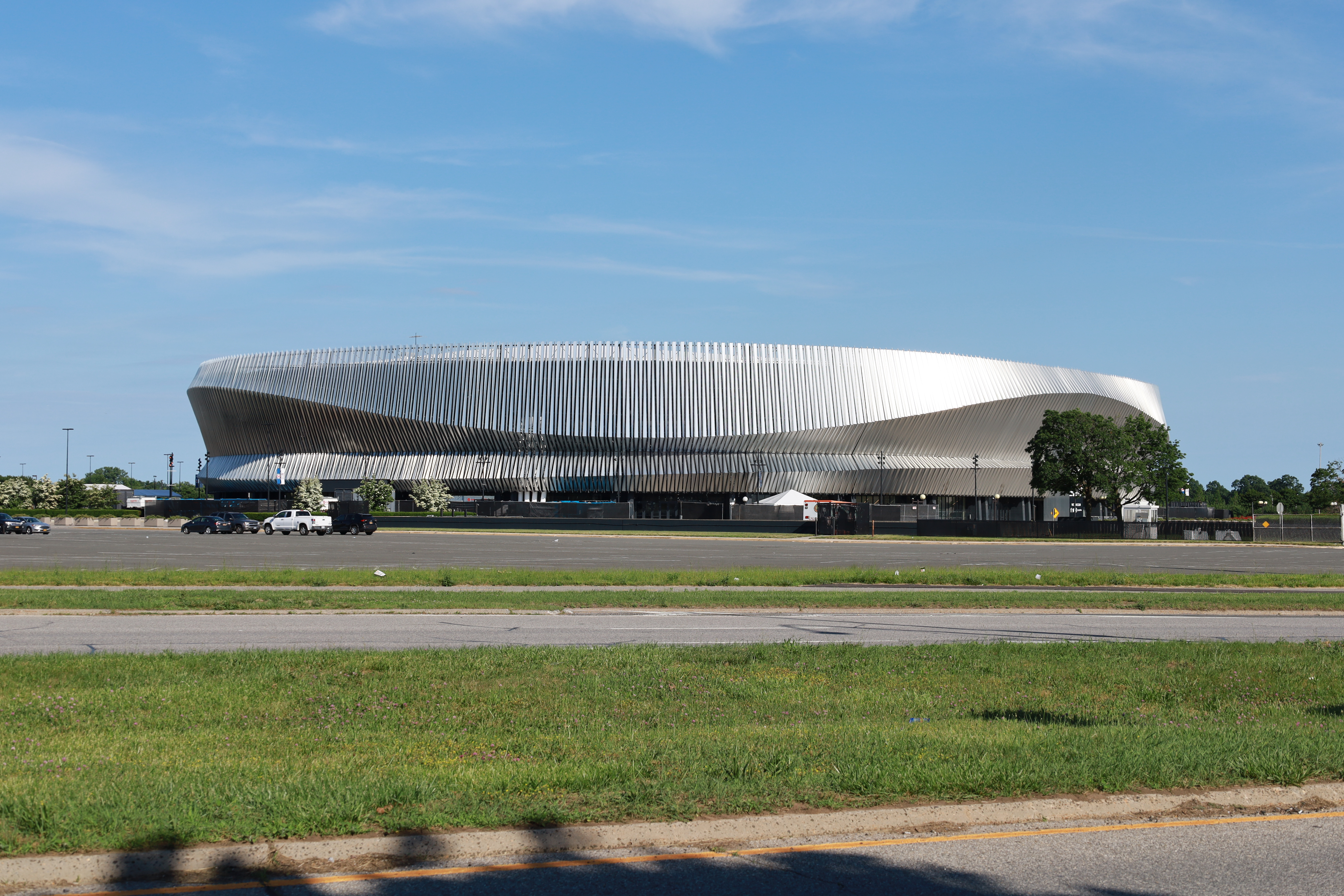
The inaugural Evolution was held at the Nassau Veterans Memorial Coliseum in Uniondale, New York.

On the July 23, 2018, episode of Monday Night Raw, WWE executive Stephanie McMahon announced that for the first time, WWE would hold an all-women's professional wrestling event titled Evolution. The event was scheduled to take place on October 28, 2018, at the Nassau Veterans Memorial Coliseum in Uniondale, New York, featuring women's wrestlers from the main roster brands, Raw and SmackDown, and the developmental brands, NXT and NXT UK. It aired on pay-per-view (PPV) worldwide and was livestreamed on the WWE Network. Tickets went on sale on August 24 through Ticketmaster. WWE had originally planned to hold its annual TLC: Tables, Ladders & Chairs event on October 21, but with the announcement of Evolution, the 2018 TLC event was pushed back to its regular December slot to replace an originally scheduled Clash of Champions.

WWE Hall of Famers Lita, Trish Stratus, and Beth Phoenix were advertised as taking part in the event. It was also announced that the event would host the final of the 2018 Mae Young Classic and that all four of WWE's women's championships at the time would be defended; however, the NXT UK Women's Championship match was later removed from the main card and occurred as a dark match before the show.

WWE's executive vice president Paul "Triple H" Levesque explained that WWE's female performers "deserve[d] the opportunity" for a prominent showcase, and that it "was simply the right time for this to happen". He denied that the event was intended to be as a counterpoint for Crown Jewel—a subsequent major event days later in Saudi Arabia that, per the country's women's rights policies, would not include WWE's female performers at the time.

A documentary special entitled "Road to Evolution" was broadcast on the USA Network ahead of the event, as well as the E! Network following the premiere of the sixth episode of Total Divas's eighth season. Internationally, the special was made available on the WWE Network. Evolution was promoted heavily by mainstream media outlets, which included The Bella Twins (Nikki Bella and Brie Bella) promoting the event on The Tonight Show Starring Jimmy Fallon.

=== Storylines ===
The event comprised seven matches that resulted from scripted storylines. Results were predetermined by WWE's writers on the Raw, SmackDown, NXT, and NXT UK brands, while storylines were produced on WWE's weekly television shows, Monday Night Raw, SmackDown Live, and NXT.

On August 18, a match between Alexa Bliss and Trish Stratus was scheduled for Evolution. Then, on September 3, a match between Lita and Mickie James was scheduled for the event; the two last faced each other back in 2006 at Survivor Series where James won the original WWE Women's Championship from Lita in the latter's retirement match. On the October 8 episode of Raw, a confrontation between the four women occurred. It was then revealed that instead of the two singles matches, Bliss and James would face Stratus and Lita in a tag team match at Evolution. On October 26, however, Alicia Fox replaced Bliss due to injury, but it was revealed that she would be in James and Fox's corner for the match.

At NXT TakeOver: Brooklyn 4, Kairi Sane defeated Shayna Baszler to win the NXT Women's Championship. On the September 26 episode of NXT, a rematch between the two for the title was scheduled for Evolution.

At SummerSlam, Ronda Rousey won the Raw Women's Championship. Following her win, The Bella Twins (Nikki Bella and Brie Bella) celebrated with the new champion. At Super Show-Down, it was announced that a title defense for Rousey was scheduled for Evolution. At that same event, Rousey and The Bella Twins teamed up to defeat The Riott Squad (Ruby Riott, Liv Morgan, and Sarah Logan). On the following episode of Raw, Rousey and The Bella Twins defeated The Riott Squad in a rematch. Following the match, however, The Bella Twins attacked Rousey, turning heel. Later that night, a title match between Rousey and Nikki was scheduled for Evolution.

At SummerSlam, Charlotte Flair defeated Becky Lynch and defending champion Carmella in a triple threat match to become a two-time SmackDown Women's Champion by pinning Lynch. Following the match, Lynch attacked Flair, turning heel. Lynch then defeated Flair to win the championship at Hell in a Cell. A rematch occurred at Super Show-Down where Flair won by disqualification after Lynch attacked her with the title belt, thus Lynch retained. The two faced each other in a rematch on the following episode of SmackDown, however, it ended in a double countout, resulting in Lynch retaining again. SmackDown General Manager Paige then announced that the two would have another rematch for the SmackDown Women's Championship at Evolution in WWE's first-ever Last Woman Standing match.

On the October 15 episode of Raw, it was announced that a battle royal for a women's championship match would also take place at Evolution with various competitors announced to take part, including WWE legends and Hall of Famers.

On the October 22 episode of Raw, it was announced that The Riott Squad (Ruby Riott, Liv Morgan, and Sarah Logan) would face off against the team of Sasha Banks, Bayley, and Natalya.

== Event ==
Other on-screen personnel
Role:	Name:
English commentators	Michael Cole
English commentators	Renee Young
English commentators	Beth Phoenix
Spanish commentators	Carlos Cabrera
Spanish commentators	Marcelo Rodríguez
German commentators	Carsten Schaefer
German commentators	Calvin Knie
Ring announcers	Lilian Garcia
Ring announcers	JoJo
Ring announcers	Kayla Braxton
Referees	Jason Ayers
Referees	Shawn Bennett
Referees	Jessika Carr
Referees	Mike Chioda
Referees	Aubrey Edwards
Referees	Darrick Moore
Referees	Rod Zapata
Interviewers	Charly Caruso
Interviewers	Kayla Braxton
Pre-show panel	Renee Young
Pre-show panel	Paige
Pre-show panel	Beth Phoenix
Pre-show panel	Carmella
Pre-show panel	Michael Cole
Pre-show panel	Eve Torres

Before the event aired live, a dark match took place in which Rhea Ripley defeated Dakota Kai to retain the NXT UK Women's Championship.

=== Preliminary matches ===
The actual event opened with Alicia Fox and Mickie James (accompanied by Alexa Bliss) facing Lita and Trish Stratus. In the end, Lita performed a "Litasault" on both James and Fox, and Stratus performed a "Chick Kick" on James to win the match.

Next was the 20-woman Battle Royal which started with various WWE legends eliminating both of The IIconics (Peyton Royce and Billie Kay) and reuniting against current women. In the end, thinking that she won the match, Zelina Vega, who had not actually been eliminated, began celebrating, not realizing that neither Nia Jax or Ember Moon were eliminated. After Jax eliminated Vega by throwing her at Tamina, who was already eliminated and was standing at ringside, Jax eliminated Moon to earn a future opportunity at the Raw Women's Championship.

After that, Toni Storm fought Io Shirai in the tournament final of the 2018 Mae Young Classic. Shirai performed a dropkick on Storm from the top rope, followed by a moonsault at ringside. In the end, Storm countered a Moonsault by raising her knees and performed the "Storm Zero" on Shirai to win the match and the trophy. After the match, an elated Storm was congratulated by Triple H, Stephanie McMahon, and Sara Amato.

In the fourth match, Natalya teamed up with Bayley and Sasha Banks to face The Riott Squad (Liv Morgan, Ruby Riott, and Sarah Logan). In the climax, Natalya applied a double sharpshooter on Riott and Logan, only for Morgan to perform the "201 Facebreaker" on Natalya for a nearfall. Natalya then performed a powerbomb on Morgan, followed by a diving elbow drop from Bayley and a frog splash from Banks for the victory.

Next, Kairi Sane defended the NXT Women's Championship against Shayna Baszler. During the match, as Sane attempted to perform an "Insane Elbow", Baszler rolled out of the ring. Sane then performed a diving crossbody into Baszler and threw Baszler at her fellow and former MMA Four Horsewomen, Marina Shafir and Jessamyn Duke, who were at ringside. In the climax, Duke and Shafir distracted Sane which led to Baszler applying the "Kirifuda Clutch". However, Sane was able to counter into a roll-up for a nearfall. Sane managed another pinning combination, but Baszler kicked out and sent Sane into a kick from Duke. Baszler then applied the "Kirifuda Clutch" on Sane, who passed out, thus Baszler won by technical submission and became the first two-time NXT Women's Champion.

In the penultimate match, Becky Lynch defended the SmackDown Women's Championship against Charlotte Flair in a Last Woman Standing match. Lynch attacked Flair with a kendo stick and a chair. Lynch attempted a "Bexploder Suplex" on Flair, but Flair countered and delivered a Back Suplex to Lynch directly onto a pile of chairs. Flair performed a Senton following a Moonsault on Lynch through a table. Flair applied the "Figure-Eight Leglock" on Lynch, whose leg was wrapped around a ladder, but Lynch was able to escape by attacking Flair with a steel chair. After Lynch and Flair brawled in the crowd, Flair cleared off the German announce table, only for Lynch to hit her with the SmackDown Women's title belt. Lynch then performed a leg drop from a ladder on Flair through the announce table and buried her under the weapons, but Flair stood at a nine count. Flair then retrieved another kendo stick and repeatedly struck Lynch with it before performing a "spear" on Lynch. In the end, Flair attempted a top-rope Moonsault on Lynch, who was lying on another table, only for Lynch to intercept Flair with a Powerbomb through the table. Flair was unable to make it to her feet before the ten count, thus Lynch retained.

=== Main event ===
In the main event, Ronda Rousey defended the Raw Women's Championship against Nikki Bella (accompanied by Brie Bella). During the match, Nikki dominated Rousey for a majority of the match. On the outside of the ring, Brie shoved Rousey into the ring post whilst the referee was distracted. Rousey attempted a "Piper's Pit" on Nikki, only for Brie to interfere. Rousey then performed the modified Samoan Drop on both Nikki and Brie for a near-fall. In the climax, Nikki performed the "Rack Attack 2.0" on Rousey for a nearfall. While Nikki was on the middle rope, Rousey performed a "Small Package driver" on Nikki and applied an armbar on Nikki, who submitted, to retain the title.

== Reception ==
The Last Woman Standing match received critical acclaim. WWE ranked the match at number 1 in their top 25 matches of 2018. It also ranked number #1 on IGN's top 10 matches of 2018.

Dave Meltzer rated the SmackDown Women's Championship match 4.75 stars, which was the highest rated match of the night. The other matches were rated as follows: the main event received 3.75 stars, the 6-woman tag team, NXT Women's Championship, and the battle royal all received 3.25 stars. The Mae Young Classic Final received 3.5 stars, and the opening tag match received 2.25 stars, the lowest rated match of the night.

== Aftermath ==
On the October 29 episode of Raw, it was announced that Raw Women's Champion Ronda Rousey would face off against SmackDown Women's Champion Becky Lynch at Survivor Series as part of the annual interbrand competition. Later that same evening, Nia Jax defeated Ember Moon after a distraction by Tamina, leading to a staredown between Tamina and Jax. After defeating Moon in a rematch the following week, Jax joined Tamina in attacking Moon, turning Jax into a villainess and establishing an alliance with Tamina. At Survivor Series, Jax was victorious for Team Raw as the lone survivor in the women's elimination match after pushing her teammate, Sasha Banks, into Asuka. On the November 19 episode of Raw, Jax's Raw Women's Championship match was confirmed for TLC: Tables, Ladders & Chairs.

Also on Raw, Sasha Banks, Bayley, and Natalya teamed with Lita and Trish Stratus to defeat The Riott Squad (Ruby Riott, Liv Morgan, and Sarah Logan), Alicia Fox, and Mickie James in a ten-woman tag team match.

After losing to Becky Lynch at Evolution, Charlotte Flair received an offer from SmackDown General Manager Paige on the October 30 episode of SmackDown, being asked to captain Team SmackDown in the women's elimination match, only for Charlotte to turn down the offer. Charlotte instead became Lynch's replacement in a match against Raw Women's Champion Ronda Rousey at the event, as Lynch suffered a legit injury just days prior to Survivor Series.

On the November 7 episode of NXT, it was announced that Kairi Sane would be invoking her rematch clause and would face NXT Women's Champion Shayna Baszler in a two-out-of-three-falls match at NXT TakeOver: WarGames.

Evolution was heavily featured across the fourth season of Total Bellas, which followed Nikki Bella and Brie Bella leading up to the event.

On June 9, 2020, Evolution was broadcast on Fox Sports 1, followed by a special all-female edition of WWE Backstage featuring Renee Young, Paige, Ember Moon, Beth Phoenix, and Sonya Deville.

=== Future all-female events ===
In a December 2019 interview with Talksport, Stephanie McMahon stated: "I'm hopeful to have an announcement on an Evolution 2, but there is nothing official to announce just yet". A report by Alex McCarthy of Sportskeeda in July 2020 stated that a second Evolution event was seen a "no brainer", with female talent pushing for it internally and tentative plans being made for the end of the year. In December 2020, Trish Stratus suggested that she had begun training for the rumored event, but that she had received no call from WWE, with no event taking place.

In a conference call for June 2021's NXT TakeOver: In Your House event, Triple H was questioned on if WWE would ever hold another all-female event. He said it was possible, "but it's not a must-have at the moment". He also found it odd that people thought that doing more all-female events would mean equality for the women's division, but cited the contradiction in that WWE would be criticized if they would run an all-male event; essentially, separate does not mean equal. He also responded to a comment made by former WWE wrestler Mickie James in regards to the National Wrestling Alliance's August 2021 all-female event, EmPowerrr, in which James served as an executive producer. James had said that she wanted the best female wrestlers in the world on the event regardless of contractual issues. Triple H said that from a business standpoint, that did not make sense and also gave his own opinion, stating that if female wrestlers wanted to face the best in the world, they should come to WWE.

Before James' release from WWE in April 2021, she had pushed for the company to produce another all-female event as well as an all-female brand, but said she was "cut off at every opportunity". She claimed an unnamed WWE official told her that "women's wrestling doesn't make money" and that Evolution was the company's "lowest-rated pay-per-view ever in the history of WWE pay-per-views". However, James rebuked this by saying the event was set up to fail, only being promoted on WWE programming a month prior to the event, with matches being announced a week or two before. Other WWE female performers, notably Sasha Banks, were also vocal in support of another all-female event.

In June 2021, former WWE wrestler Maria Kanellis also stated that former Head of WWE Talent Relations, Mark Carano, informed her that there would not be another all-female event. Dave Meltzer stated on Wrestling Observer Radio that while Evolution was not a commercial failure for WWE, and not the worst performing event of the year, it was still on the lower end of ticket sales despite its heavy marketing push compared to those similar to its size. Glenn Rubenstein of Wrestling Inc. reported that 90% of the seats were filled in the arena despite the reported sell-out. Prior to the announcement of the match between Nikki Bella and Ronda Rousey, which saw a surge in ticket sales, WWE had sold 7,000 tickets, with 3,000 of those tickets belonging to scalpers.

On March 6, 2025, a report emerged that WWE were planning to hold a second Evolution event. Bodyslam.net stated that the company were aiming to hold the event on July 5, 2025, at the Mohegan Sun Arena in Uncasville, Connecticut, but noted that while the event was in the works, the schedule was tentative. On May 12, 2025, a new report from PWInsider stated that the company was now looking to hold the event a week later from Atlanta, Georgia during the same weekend as Saturday Night's Main Event XL. This was confirmed by WWE at Saturday Night's Main Event XXXIX on May 24, 2025, with the second Evolution event scheduled for Sunday, July 13 at Atlanta's State Farm Arena.

== Results ==
No.	Results	Stipulations	Times
1^{D}	Rhea Ripley (c) defeated Dakota Kai by pinfall	Singles match for the NXT UK Women's Championship	4:21
2	Trish Stratus and Lita defeated Mickie James and Alicia Fox (with Alexa Bliss) by pinfall	Tag team match	11:05
3	Nia Jax won by last eliminating Ember Moon (Note: Order of elimination: Peyton Royce, Billie Kay, Molly Holly, Kelly Kelly, Torrie Wilson, Sonya Deville, Alundra Blayze, Maria Kanellis, Lana, Mandy Rose, Dana Brooke, Michelle McCool, Naomi, Carmella, Ivory, Asuka, Tamina, Zelina Vega, Ember Moon)	20-woman Battle Royal for a women's championship match	16:10
4	Toni Storm defeated Io Shirai by pinfall	2018 Mae Young Classic tournament final match	10:20
5	Sasha Banks, Bayley, and Natalya defeated The Riott Squad (Ruby Riott, Liv Morgan, and Sarah Logan) by pinfall	Six-woman tag team match	13:10
6	Shayna Baszler defeated Kairi Sane (c) by technical submission	Singles match for the NXT Women's Championship	12:10
7	Becky Lynch (c) defeated Charlotte Flair	Last Woman Standing match for the WWE Smackdown Women's Championship	28:40
8	Ronda Rousey (c) defeated Nikki Bella (with Brie Bella) by submission	Singles match for the WWE Raw Women's Championship	14:15
(c) / – the champion(s) heading into the match; D / – this was a dark match

== See also ==
- NWA EmPowerrr, the all women event produced by NWA.
