= The Bar (professional wrestling) =

Professional wrestling tag team

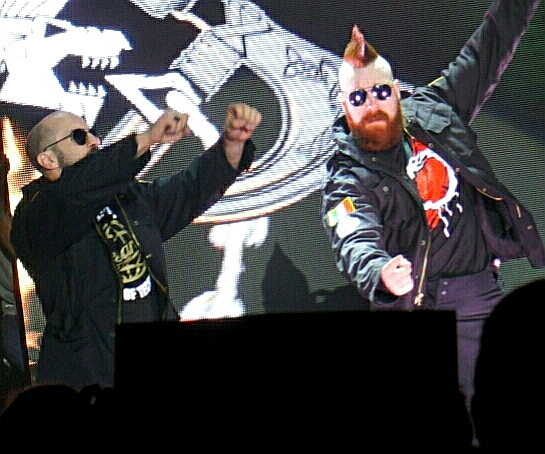
- Cesaro and Sheamus in May 2017

Tag team
- Members: Cesaro; Sheamus
- Name(s): Cesaro and Sheamus; The Bar
- Combined billed weight: 499 lb (226 kg)
- Debut: September 26, 2016
- Disbanded: April 22, 2019

The Bar, originally simply known as Cesaro and Sheamus, was a professional wrestling tag team in WWE. They were record setting four-time Raw Tag Team Champions and former SmackDown Tag Team Champions, making their team overall five-time champions in WWE.

The duo were originally in a feud together from July to September 2016, but after a Best of Seven series culminated in a tie, the two were forced to work as a team by then-Raw General Manager Mick Foley. "The Bar", originally an informal nickname until they joined SmackDown in 2018, originates from their catchphrase: "We don't just set the bar, we are the bar!" The team was forced to disband in April 2019 due to Sheamus suffering an injury and Cesaro being drafted to Raw.

== History ==
=== Raw ===
Following the reintroduction of the WWE brand split in July 2016, both Cesaro and Sheamus were drafted to the Raw brand. The two began a rivalry in August, leading Raw general manager Mick Foley to schedule a best-of-seven series between them; Sheamus won the first match at SummerSlam. With the series tied at 3–3, the seventh match ended in a no-contest at Clash of Champions. On the September 26 episode of Raw, Foley paired the two and awarded them an opportunity for the Raw Tag Team Championship.

Despite their differences, Cesaro and Sheamus defeated the champions The New Day at Hell in a Cell in October, but did not win the titles as the match ended in a disqualification. The following month at Survivor Series, they were the sole survivors for Team Raw in the 10-on-10 tag team double elimination match, earning another title opportunity from Foley. After losing to The New Day twice more, they eventually defeated them at Roadblock: End of the Line on December 18 to win the championships, ending The New Day's record-setting 483-day reign.

On January 16, Cesaro and Sheamus announced their participation in the Royal Rumble match. Before that match, however, they were scheduled to defend the Raw Tag Team Championship against Gallows and Anderson on the Royal Rumble pre-show, where they lost the titles, ending their reign at 42 days. The duo then began to show tension between each other and were both later eliminated from the match by Chris Jericho. Their championship rematch was sabotaged by Enzo Amore and Big Cass, who interfered and caused a disqualification loss for the pair. Cesaro then defeated Enzo before he and Sheamus were defeated by the duo the week after to become the number one contenders to the title. At Fastlane, Cesaro defeated Jinder Mahal. It was later announced that Cesaro and Sheamus were to compete for the Raw Tag Team Championship against Enzo and Cass and Anderson and Gallows in a triple threat ladder match at WrestleMania 33. At the event, however, the match was made a four-way ladder match when the returning Hardy Boyz were added, who won the match.

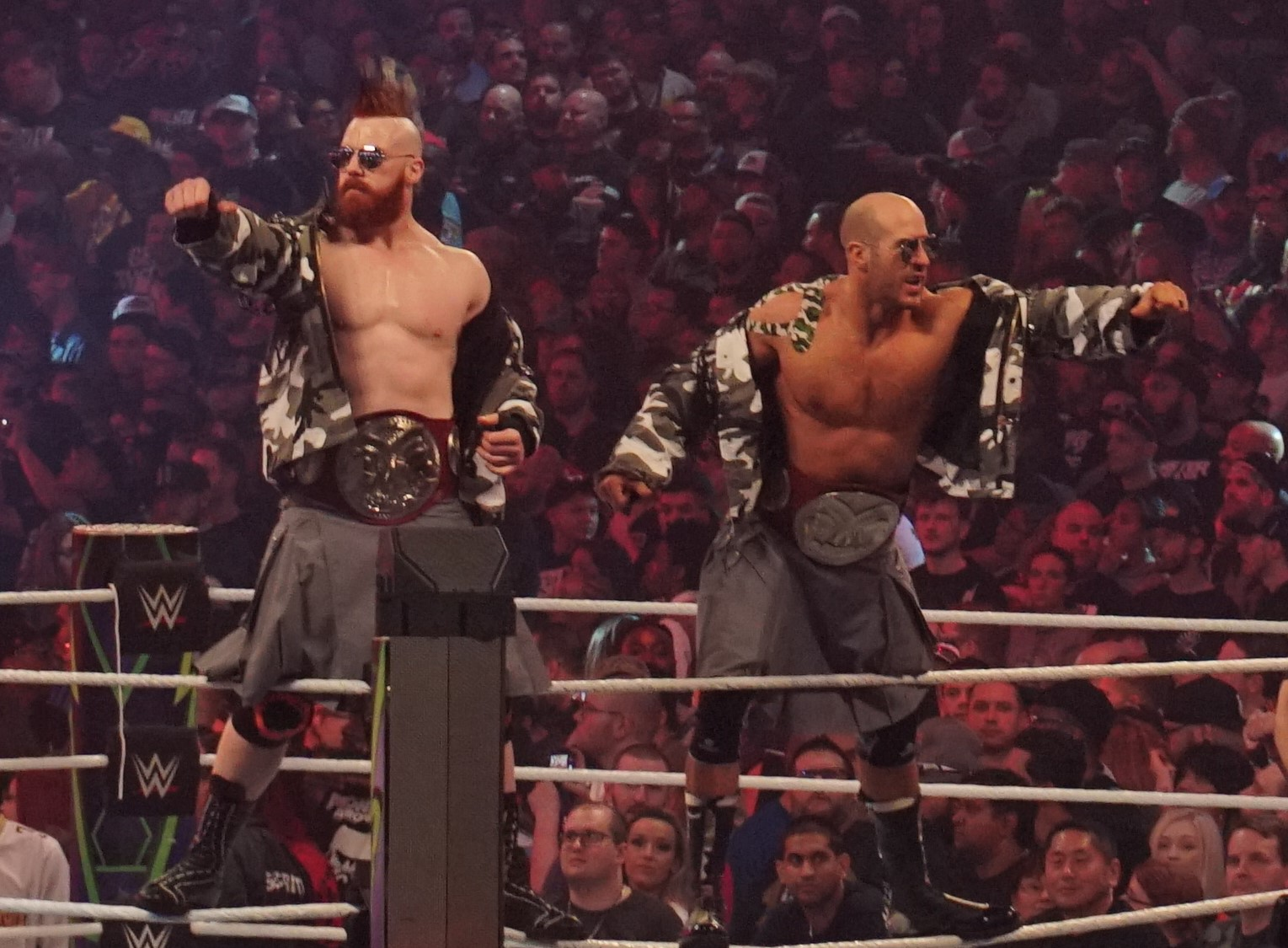
Sheamus and Cesaro as Raw Tag Team Champions at WrestleMania 34

At Payback, they were defeated by The Hardys, and attacked them after the match, turning heels in the process. They began calling themselves by the collective nickname The Bar, stating "We don't just set the bar, we are the bar!", and their entrances became further synchronized, wearing the same attire to the ring. They regained the titles at Extreme Rules in a steel cage match and defended them in a 30-Minute Iron Man match against The Hardy Boyz at the Great Balls of Fire pay-per-view. During the Summer, The Bar started a feud with Seth Rollins, who allied with his former stablemate Dean Ambrose. At SummerSlam they lost the titles against Rollins and Ambrose and lost the rematch at No Mercy. Cesaro and Sheamus aligned with The Miz as a result of the continuing feud with this eventually resulting in the reunion of the Shield when Rollins and Ambrose re-aligned with Roman Reigns. At TLC: Tables, Ladders and Chairs, the team of The Miz, Cesaro, Sheamus, Braun Strowman and Kane lost to Ambrose, Rollins and Kurt Angle, who replaced Reigns due to Reigns being removed from the match on medical grounds, in a five-on-three Handicap Tables, Ladders and Chairs match.

On the November 6 episode of Raw in Manchester, England, Cesaro and Sheamus defeated Ambrose and Rollins following a distraction from their former rivals The New Day to win the titles. By winning this match, it set them up to face SmackDown Tag Team Champions The Usos in a champions vs. champions match at Survivor Series. Cesaro and Sheamus lost the match. Cesaro and Sheamus then lost the Raw Tag Team Titles to Rollins and Jason Jordan on the Christmas episode of Raw. They had their rematch at the Royal Rumble, where they regained the titles, becoming record four-time champions as a team and marking an individual record fifth reign for Cesaro. After Braun Strowman singlehandedly won a tag team battle royal for a Raw Tag Team Championship match at WrestleMania 34, Cesaro and Sheamus were scheduled to defend the titles as long as Strowman found a partner. After weeks of failed attempts of finding out who Strowman's partner was, Cesaro and Sheamus walked into WrestleMania clueless. At the event, Strowman chose a 10-year old fan named Nicholas as his partner and they defeated Cesaro and Sheamus for the Raw Tag Team Titles.

=== SmackDown ===
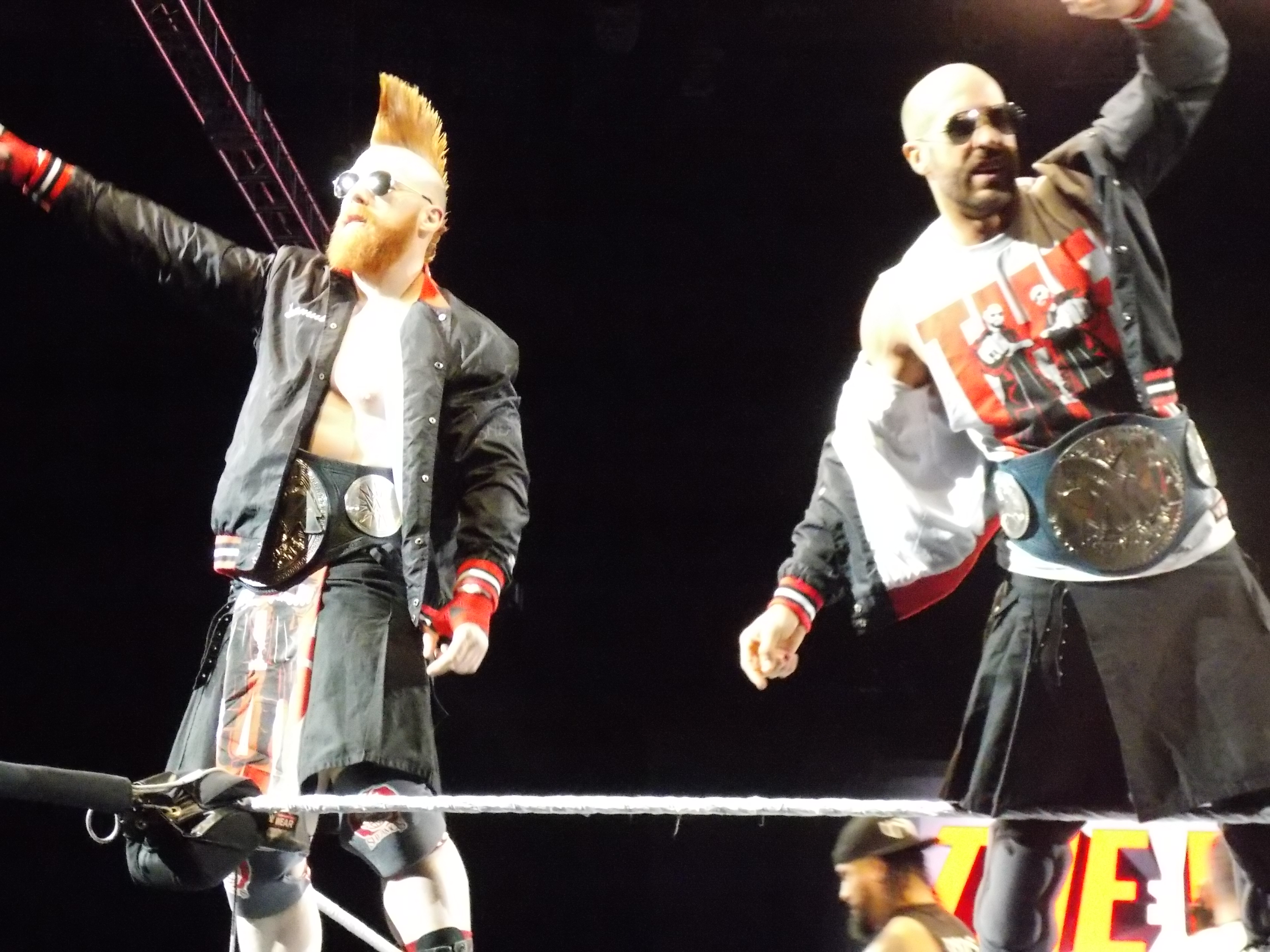
The Bar as SmackDown Tag Team Champions in January 2019

On April 17, as part of the Superstar Shake-up, Cesaro and Sheamus, now officially known as The Bar, were traded to SmackDown. Despite the trade, they still had an opportunity to win the Raw Tag Team Championship as they faced Matt Hardy and Bray Wyatt at the Greatest Royal Rumble, but failed to win the Raw Tag Team Championship. They entered a brief feud with The New Day, losing to them and failing to qualify for the Money in the Bank ladder match. After going on a hiatus, the duo returned in late-July to take part in a No. 1 Contenders Tournament for the SmackDown Tag Team Championship beat The Usos to advance to the finals, where they lost to The New Day. After failing to become number one contenders again, the duo finally were gifted a title match. At Super Show-Down, The Bar failed to win the title.

At the 1000th episode of SmackDown on October 16, The Bar defeated The New Day to capture the titles with unlikely help from Big Show. They subsequently retained the titles against The New Day at Crown Jewel and Starrcade. On the November 27 episode of SmackDown Live, The Bar and Big Show's brief alliance ended after a confrontation backstage. They later entered a feud with The Miz and Shane McMahon, culminating in a match at the Royal Rumble on January 27, where The Bar lost the SmackDown Tag Team Championship to Miz and McMahon. The following SmackDown they lost a number one contenders match to The Usos. The Bar defeated Kofi Kingston at Fastlane in an impromptu 2-on-1 handicap match. The team then lost to New Day, DIY, The Hardy Boyz, and Aleister Black and Ricochet over the next two months on SmackDown.

At WrestleMania 35 in April, The Bar lost to The Usos in a match for the SmackDown Tag Team Championships. At the Raw following WrestleMania, The Bar interrupted a Winner Takes All match between Seth Rollins and Kofi Kingston, resulting in a tag team match. This resulted in "AEW" and "CM Punk" chants from the crowd, voicing their displeasure in the match they were given instead. The next day on SmackDown, Sheamus suffered a concussion in a six-man tag team match with New Day. Cesaro was drafted to Raw a few weeks later and started competing as a solo wrestler, although he would keep the bar theme song and attire. He would later premiere a new song and attire different from the bar. Cesaro stated in a later promo that The Bar had broken up due to Sheamus having to take the time off. Sheamus returned to action in 2020 and both resumed their careers as singles wrestlers. Cesaro left WWE in February 2022.

In May 2026, it was revealed that former WWE writer Chris Dunn had pitched in plans to resurrect and reboot the New World Order stable during the ThunderDome era and it was set to feature Cesaro and Sheamus, along with Shinsuke Nakamura (who was part of the former Artist Collective stable with Sami Zayn at that time) and Lars Sullivan; with an unnamed nWo legend originally set to introduce the new incarnation of the nWo but he was tested positive for COVID-19 after arriving in Orlando, which resulted the angle scrapped entirely.

== Championships and accomplishments ==
- WWE
  - WWE Raw Tag Team Championship (4 times)
  - WWE SmackDown Tag Team Championship (1 time)
  - WWE Year-End Award for Tag Team of the Year (2018)
