= Crown Jewel (2018) =

WWE pay-per-view and livestreaming event

- Promotional poster featuring The Brothers of Destruction (Kane and The Undertaker) and D-Generation X (Triple H and Shawn Michaels)
- Promotion: WWE
- Brand(s): Raw; SmackDown
- Date: November 2, 2018
- City: Riyadh, Saudi Arabia
- Venue: King Saud University Stadium
- Attendance: 16,000

WWE event chronology
← Previous; Evolution	Next → NXT TakeOver: WarGames

WWE in Saudi Arabia chronology
← Previous; Greatest Royal Rumble	Next → Super ShowDown

Crown Jewel chronology
← Previous; First	Next → 2019

The 2018 Crown Jewel was a professional wrestling pay-per-view (PPV) and livestreaming event produced by the American company WWE, held for wrestlers from the promotion's main roster brands, Raw and SmackDown. It was the inaugural Crown Jewel and took place on Friday, November 2, 2018, at the King Saud University Stadium in Riyadh, Saudi Arabia. The main card aired live at 7:00 p.m. Arabia Standard Time (12:00 p.m. Eastern Time).

This was the second event WWE held in Saudi Arabia under a 10-year partnership in support of Saudi Vision 2030, after the Greatest Royal Rumble in April, and it hosted the first-ever WWE World Cup tournament. The event marked the final match of Shawn Michaels, who had retired from active in-ring competition at WrestleMania XXVI in 2010, though returned for a one-off match at this event, and the return of Hulk Hogan—who had not appeared on WWE programming since a 2015 scandal—who served as the event's host. The event also marked the final time that The Undertaker and Kane teamed together as The Brothers of Destruction due to The Undertaker retiring in November 2020.

Twelve matches were contested at the event, including one on the Kickoff pre-show. In the main event, D-Generation X (Triple H and Shawn Michaels) defeated The Brothers of Destruction (The Undertaker and Kane). In the penultimate match, Shane McMahon defeated Dolph Ziggler to win the WWE World Cup. In other prominent matches, The Bar (Cesaro and Sheamus) retained the SmackDown Tag Team Championship against The New Day (Big E and Kofi Kingston), AJ Styles defeated Samoa Joe to retain SmackDown's WWE Championship, and Brock Lesnar defeated Braun Strowman to win Raw's vacant Universal Championship. Like the Greatest Royal Rumble, there were no women's matches on the card due to the limited rights women had in Saudi Arabia.

Due to the controversy surrounding the killing of Jamal Khashoggi as well as accusations against Saudi Arabia for severe human rights abuses, leading a war of attrition in Yemen and suppressing women's rights, WWE faced harsh criticism for producing the event and was asked to stop its business ventures in Saudi Arabia by multiple parties. The controversy also led to the company's top babyfaces at the time, John Cena and Daniel Bryan, pulling from the event. The event itself was met with overwhelmingly negative reviews, with the main event, Universal Championship match, and the World Cup final singled out for criticism. This event did not get a home video release, but it is available to stream on Netflix under the WWE section.

== Production ==
=== Background ===
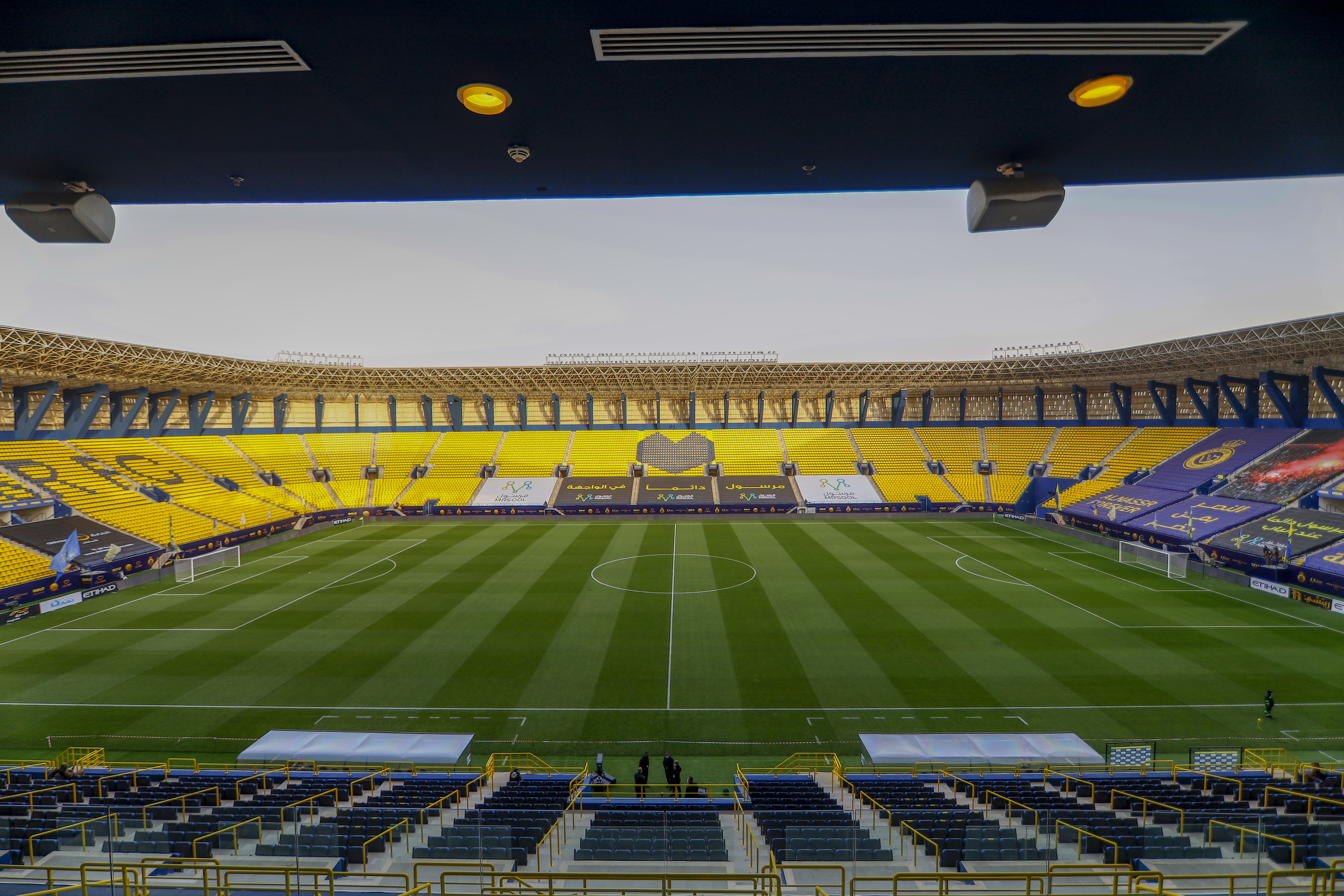
The inaugural Crown Jewel was held at the King Saud University Stadium in Riyadh, Saudi Arabia.

In early 2018, the American professional wrestling promotion WWE began a 10-year strategic multiplatform partnership with the General Sports Authority in support of Saudi Vision 2030, Saudi Arabia's social and economic reform program. The first pay-per-view (PPV) and livestreaming event under this partnership, the Greatest Royal Rumble, was held at the King Abdullah Sports City's King Abdullah International Stadium in Jeddah on April 27. On September 17, 2018, a follow-up titled Crown Jewel was announced to take place on Friday, November 2 and feature wrestlers from the Raw and SmackDown brand divisions. It was originally to take place at the King Fahd International Stadium in Riyadh, but was later changed to the city's King Saud University Stadium. In addition to the main card airing live at 7:00 p.m. Arabia Standard Time (12:00 p.m. Eastern Time) on traditional PPV worldwide, it was available to livestream on the WWE Network.

In 2015, WWE terminated Hulk Hogan's contract due to a report by the National Enquirer and Radar Online of a partially racist rant made by Hogan on his controversial leaked sex tape; he was heard expressing disgust with the notion of his daughter dating black men, referenced by the repeated use of the racial slur "nigger". On July 15, 2018, after a three-year suspension, the company reinstated Hogan into the WWE Hall of Fame, and on October 31, it was announced that Hogan would be the host of Crown Jewel.

=== Storylines ===
The event comprised 12 matches, including one on the Kickoff pre-show, that resulted from scripted storylines. Results were predetermined by WWE's writers on the Raw and SmackDown brands, while storylines were produced on WWE's weekly television shows, Monday Night Raw and SmackDown Live.

At SummerSlam, Brock Lesnar defended the Universal Championship against Roman Reigns. Before the match began, Braun Strowman came out and announced that he would be cashing in his Money in the Bank contract on the winner. During the match, however, Strowman was incapacitated by Lesnar, preventing him from cashing in. The distraction allowed Reigns to defeat Lesnar and win the championship, ending Lesnar's 504-day reign. The following night on Raw, Raw General Manager Kurt Angle told Lesnar's advocate Paul Heyman that although Lesnar had a contractual rematch, it would not occur for an indefinite period of time, as he preferred a fighting champion like Reigns. The following week, Strowman announced that he would be cashing in against Reigns at Hell in a Cell inside the namesake structure. At the event, Lesnar interfered in the match by kicking in the cell door and attacking both men, rendering them unable to continue, thus ruling the match a no contest and Reigns retained the championship. The following night on Raw, both Reigns and Strowman called out Lesnar, resulting in Acting Raw General Manager Baron Corbin scheduling a triple threat match between Reigns, Strowman, and Lesnar for the Universal Championship at Crown Jewel. On the October 22 episode of Raw, however, Reigns relinquished the title after announcing that his leukemia, which had been in remission since late 2008, had legitimately relapsed. This turned the scheduled triple threat match into a singles match between Lesnar and Strowman for the now vacant title. In February 2019, Fightful reported that prior to his leukemia diagnosis, Reigns had informed Vince McMahon and WWE officials that he would not be taking part in the Crown Jewel PPV due to the controversy surrounding the event.

On September 17, WWE scheduled the WWE World Cup for Crown Jewel, an eight-man tournament to "determine the best in the world" with four wrestlers representing Raw and SmackDown each, all from the United States of America. On the October 8 episode of Raw, for his accomplishments in WWE, John Cena was announced as the first entrant to represent Raw, despite being a non-exclusive wrestler who could appear on Raw and SmackDown. That same episode, a 10-man battle royal commenced where the winner would be added to the tournament. Acting Raw General Manager Baron Corbin took part with nine local competitors, but was lastly eliminated by a returning Kurt Angle, disguised as The Conquistador, thus Angle won the battle royal to qualify for the tournament. Two more qualifiers were decided on the October 9 episode of SmackDown, where Jeff Hardy and Randy Orton qualified for the tournament by defeating Samoa Joe and Big Show, respectively. Raw's final two qualifiers were decided on the October 15 episode of Raw, where Seth Rollins and Dolph Ziggler qualified by defeating Drew McIntyre and Dean Ambrose, respectively. SmackDown's final two qualifiers were decided on the SmackDown 1000 special, where The Miz and Rey Mysterio, the latter making his full-time WWE return, qualified for the tournament by defeating Rusev and Shinsuke Nakamura, respectively. On the October 29 episode of Raw, Acting Raw General Manager Baron Corbin replaced Cena with Bobby Lashley after praising Lashley's post-match attack on Finn Bálor earlier that night. In storyline, Corbin replaced Cena as he did not technically qualify for the tournament. In reality, Cena legitimately refused to participate due to the controversy surrounding the event. On the October 30 episode of SmackDown, SmackDown Commissioner Shane McMahon gave his four participants an ultimatum: if their finalist were to lose, they would be fired from SmackDown.

At Super Show-Down, AJ Styles defeated Samoa Joe by submission in a no countout, no disqualification match to retain the WWE Championship, while Daniel Bryan defeated The Miz to earn a future WWE Championship match. Following Bryan's win, SmackDown General Manager Paige announced that he would receive his title match against Styles at Crown Jewel. However, after the two had a heated exchange on the October 30 episode of SmackDown, Commissioner Shane McMahon announced that their championship match would take place that night, where Styles successfully retained after submitting Bryan with the "Calf Crusher". Moments after the match concluded, Joe attacked both men, choking each out with the "Coquina Clutch". Enraged, Styles demanded to face Joe at Crown Jewel with the title on the line, and Paige reluctantly made it official. In reality, Bryan had also legitimately refused to work Crown Jewel due to the controversy surrounding the event, so WWE moved his championship match up to the October 30 episode of SmackDown.

At Super Show-Down, Triple H defeated The Undertaker in a no disqualification match. After the match, Triple H and Undertaker, along with Shawn Michaels and Kane, who were in the respective corners of Triple H and Undertaker, showed mutual respect for one another until Undertaker and Kane attacked Triple H and Michaels. On the following Raw, Triple H and Michaels formally rechristened themselves as D-Generation X, challenging The Brothers of Destruction to a tag team match at Crown Jewel, marking Michaels' first match since The Undertaker retired Michaels at WrestleMania XXVI in March 2010.

On the SmackDown 1000 special on October 16, The Bar (Cesaro and Sheamus) defeated The New Day (Big E and Xavier Woods, accompanied by Kofi Kingston) to win the SmackDown Tag Team Championship, with help from their new ally Big Show. The following week, a rematch for the titles was scheduled for Crown Jewel.

On November 1, it was announced that Shinsuke Nakamura would defend the United States Championship against Rusev on the event's Kickoff pre-show.

== Event ==
Other on-screen personnel
Role:	Name:
Host	Hulk Hogan
English commentators	Michael Cole
English commentators	Corey Graves
English commentators	Renee Young
Arabic commentators	Faisal Almughaisib
Arabic commentators	Sultan Alharbi
Arabic commentators	Jude Aldajani
Ring announcer	Greg Hamilton
Referees	Danilo Anfibio
Referees	Jason Ayers
Referees	Shawn Bennett
Referees	John Cone
Referees	Darrick Moore
Referees	Ryan Tran
Interviewer	Byron Saxton
Pre-show panel	Jonathan Coachman
Pre-show panel	David Otunga
Pre-show panel	Booker T

=== Pre-show ===
During the Crown Jewel Kickoff pre-show, Shinsuke Nakamura defended the United States Championship against Rusev. After connecting with a "Matchka Kick" early in the match, Rusev applied his "Accolade" submission hold twice on the champion. In the climax, following a low blow to break free from the hold, Nakamura pinned Rusev to retain the title.

=== Preliminary matches ===
The actual pay-per-view opened with Rey Mysterio facing Randy Orton in SmackDown's first WWE World Cup quarterfinal match. During the match, Orton attempted to remove Mysterio's mask. Orton countered a "619" attempt from Mysterio into an elevated DDT from the rope. In the end, Mysterio countered an "RKO" attempt into a roll-up pin to win the match and advance to the semi-finals. After the match, Orton attacked Mysterio and threw Mysterio on top of the Arabic announce table.

Next, The Miz faced Jeff Hardy in SmackDown's second WWE World Cup quarterfinal match. During the match, Miz applied a figure-four leglock, which Hardy countered into a near fall. In the climax, Miz countered Hardy's "Twist of Fate" into a "Skull Crushing Finale" to win the match and advance to the semi-finals.

After that, Seth Rollins faced Bobby Lashley (with Lio Rush) in Raw's first WWE World Cup quarterfinal match. As Lashley attempted to perform a spear in Rollins, Rollins leaped over Lashley and then performed "The Stomp" on Lashley to win the match and advance to the semi-finals.

In the fourth match, Kurt Angle faced Dolph Ziggler (accompanied by Drew McIntyre) in Raw's second and the final WWE World Cup quarterfinal match. Angle performed a trio of suplexes on Ziggler for a near fall. Angle countered a sleeper hold by Ziggler with more suplexes. Ziggler performed a DDT on Angle for a near fall of his own. Angle performed an Angle Slam on Ziggler, countering for another near fall. Angle applied the ankle lock on Ziggler, however, Ziggler countered. In the climax, Ziggler performed a "Zig-Zag" on Angle to win the match and advance to the semi-finals.

Following the conclusion of all World Cup quarterfinals, The Bar (Cesaro and Sheamus) (accompanied by Big Show) defended the SmackDown Tag Team Championship against The New Day (Big E and Kofi Kingston) (accompanied by Xavier Woods). After Kingston and Big E took down Sheamus, Cesaro broke up the pin to void the pinfall. In the end, Sheamus countered an attack from Big E and shoved him into Show, who was standing on the ring apron. While the referee was distracted, Show performed a knockout punch on Big E, and Sheamus performed a "Brogue Kick" on Big E to retain the titles.

After that, The Miz faced Rey Mysterio in SmackDown's WWE World Cup semi-final match. Throughout the match, Mysterio sold the injuries sustained by Orton's previous assault. Miz countered a splash from Mysterio into a roll-up to win the match earning a spot in the finals.

Next, Seth Rollins faced Dolph Ziggler (accompanied by Drew McIntyre) in Raw's WWE World Cup semi-final match. Rollins and Ziggler exchanged a number of roll-ups for near falls. Rollins performed a suicide dive on Ziggler. Ziggler performed a "Famouser" on Rollins for a near fall. Ziggler countered a superplex combination into a "Zig-Zag" on Rollins for a near fall. Finally, as Rollins attempted a splash on Ziggler, McIntyre pushed Rollins from the top rope and Ziggler performed a Superkick on Rollins to win the match to advance and the finals.

In the ninth match, AJ Styles defended the WWE Championship against Samoa Joe. Joe dominated Styles early in the match and began to target Styles' knee, who in turn focused on Joe's injured knee himself. Joe performed a suicide dive on Styles outside the ring, sending Styles into the commentary desk. Inside the ring, Styles performed the "Calf Crusher" on Joe's injured leg but Joe reached the ropes. After that, Joe caught Styles in his "Coquina Clutch" submission hold. In the end, Styles performed the Phenomenal Forearm on Joe and pinned him to retain the title.

Following this, Braun Strowman faced Brock Lesnar (accompanied by Paul Heyman) for the vacant Universal Championship. Acting Raw General Manager Baron Corbin came out to present the title to the winner of the match. Before the match began, Corbin attacked Strowman with the title belt. Lesnar then attacked Strowman with three "F-5s", however, all three resulted in near falls. Lesnar performed another "F-5" on Strowman to the outside of the ring, forcing Strowman to beat a countout. Lesnar performed a fifth "F-5" on Strowman to win the vacant title. With this win, Lesnar became the first two-time Universal Champion.

The penultimate match was the final of the WWE World Cup tournament between The Miz and Dolph Ziggler. Ziggler arrived at ringside with Drew McIntyre, who was immediately removed from ringside. The Miz used this to get an advantage over Ziggler, however, he received a kayfabe injury which led to him unable to compete. This led to SmackDown Commissioner Shane McMahon taking Miz's place in the match. As the match officially began, Shane attacked Ziggler, however, Acting Raw General Manager Baron Corbin interfered only to get ejected himself. Ziggler then performed a "Zig-Zag" for a near-fall. In the end, Shane pinned Ziggler following a "Coast-to-Coast" to win the match, the WWE World Cup, and trophy.

=== Main event ===
In the main event, D-Generation X (Triple H and Shawn Michaels) faced The Brothers of Destruction (The Undertaker and Kane) in Michaels' first match since 2010, as well as the first time that the two tag teams ever faced each other. Kane blocked a "Sweet Chin Music" attempt from Michaels and countered with a chokeslam. Later in the match, Michaels floored The Undertaker with a successful "Sweet Chin Music". During the match, all four men brawled, leading to the outside ring area where Kane put Triple H through an announce table. Michaels performed a moonsault from the top rope on The Undertaker and Kane outside the ring. Triple H performed "The Pedigree" on The Undertaker, who countered into a submission hold. The end came when Michaels performed another "Sweet Chin Music" on Kane, followed by a "Pedigree" from Triple H, who pinned Kane to win the match. During the match, Triple H was legitimately injured, suffering a torn pectoral muscle.

== Controversy ==
As had already been the case with the Greatest Royal Rumble, WWE came under scrutiny for catering to a state accused of severe human rights abuses, leading a war of attrition in Yemen and suppressing women's rights.

Due to restrictions on women under Saudi Law, female wrestlers have not been allowed to perform at WWE's events in Saudi Arabia, although female commentator Renee Young did provide commentary at Crown Jewel. Prior to the announcement of Crown Jewel, WWE announced its first-ever all-women's pay-per-view event, Evolution, which took place on October 28, 2018. Triple H, WWE's Executive Vice President of Talent, Live Events and Creative, as well as a current wrestler, denied that Evolution was intended to be a counterpoint for the all-male Saudi Arabia events, explaining that WWE's female performers "deserve[d] the opportunity" for such a showcase, and that it "was simply the right time for this to happen".

=== Killing of Jamal Khashoggi ===
In wake of the killing of Jamal Khashoggi at the hands of Saudi agents, WWE faced calls to cancel the event, with prominent U.S. Democratic and Republican politicians criticizing the company's endeavors in Saudi Arabia. Questions were raised whether because of the position of Administrator of the Small Business Administration Linda McMahon, who is the wife of WWE CEO Vince McMahon and a former WWE executive herself, WWE's endeavors in Saudi Arabia could still be viewed as a strictly private business enterprise. Due to this, Democratic Senator Bob Menendez urged the US government to pressure WWE into canceling the event, while Republican Lindsey Graham, among others, called for WWE to reconsider their business deal with the Saudi kingdom. English comedian and political commentator John Oliver also weighed in on the controversy on his show Last Week Tonight, criticizing WWE for what he saw as blatant pro-Saudi propaganda.

Knox County Mayor and professional wrestler Kane, who was scheduled to compete in a tag team match, announced he would work at the event, contrasting reports that the majority of WWE's wrestlers felt uncomfortable working the show. Former WWE wrestler John Layfield spoke on Fox News in favor of the event in order to promote change, while current WWE wrestlers Randy Orton, Ronda Rousey, and Mark Henry had similar remarks when speaking with TMZ. On the other hand, John Cena, who was scheduled to participate in the WWE World Cup and had called it "an honor and a privilege" to compete in Saudi Arabia during the Greatest Royal Rumble, was replaced by Bobby Lashley, as he reportedly refused to work the show in wake of the Khashoggi murder. Daniel Bryan, who was scheduled to face AJ Styles for the WWE Championship, had his title match bumped up to the October 30 episode of SmackDown, and was replaced on the Crown Jewel card by Samoa Joe, as he too reportedly refused to work the show. In February 2019, Fightful reported that prior to his leukemia diagnosis, Roman Reigns, who was scheduled to defend the WWE Universal Championship, had informed Vince McMahon and WWE officials that he would also refuse to work the show.

WWE continued to promote the show, but erased all references to Saudi Arabia as the event's location. On October 19, the day tickets were to go on sale, the Saudi government confirmed the death of Khashoggi within the consulate and WWE.com removed ticket information from the event page. On October 25, WWE confirmed the event would go on as planned, citing contractual obligations to the General Sports Authority. Speaking with Sky Sports on pushing forward with the event despite the murder, WWE CBO Stephanie McMahon spoke of "an incredibly tough decision, given that heinous act", but said that in the end it was strictly a business decision.

== Reception ==
The show received generally negative reviews from critics, with Shane McMahon's participation in the finals of the World Cup, the Universal Championship match, and the main event tag team match in particular receiving criticism. Adam Silverstein and Jack Crosby of CBS Sports gave the event a "C−" rating, describing that the show "failed as a normal event but at least had enough to talk about afterward", while finding the booking and WWE's long-term plans questionable. Bryan Rose of the Wrestling Observer described Crown Jewel as a show that ended "mercifully". Writing for Pro Wrestling Dot Net, Jason Powell viewed the event as a "cash grab" by WWE, and said that "Crown Jewel was gross for all the obvious reasons, including Vince McMahon doubling down on the controversy by bringing back Hulk Hogan". He did also note that the kickoff show had a quality match between Rusev and Shinsuke Nakamura.

Silverstein and Crosby said that the main event tag team match between D-Generation X and The Brothers of Destruction offered "effort and nostalgia ... but not much more" given the wrestlers' age, resulting in them "operating at 50 percent of their prior capacity". Rose said that although Crown Jewel's main event was better than that of Super Show-Down's, which featured the same four men, Crown Jewel's main event was still "very plodding" and "long". Powell wrote that despite their efforts, "everyone involved came up short regardless of how much gushing the broadcast team did afterward", and the four veterans were instead "stealing the spotlight from the deserving full-time stars of yet another generation". In 2020, pro wrestler Chris Jericho named the match "the worst match I have ever seen".

The WWE World Cup Final was rated "C+" by Silverstein and Crosby, who said it was "creative though a bit confounding". Powell felt that all of the tournament matches were "basic and brief", and that Shane McMahon had become "yet another heel authority figure" in WWE. In addition to the SmackDown Tag Team Championship match, Rose said that most of the tournament matches were "paint by numbers" or "nothing special", with only Ziggler-Angle "decent" and Ziggler-Rollins "pretty good". He also said that Ziggler-McMahon "couldn't be more destructive towards people that need a boost the most" – a sentiment he also felt about the Universal Championship match – while a "McMahon winning [the WWE World Cup], which was to crown the best in the world, feels like an allegory for something."

For the two world championship matches, Silverstein and Crosby gave the Universal Championship match a "D+" rating. They said that Brock Lesnar's win was a positive, but it was wholly outweighed by "no offense from [Braun] Strowman". Powell was positive of the match, stating that it was a good decision to not rush Strowman into winning a world title. For the WWE Championship match between AJ Styles and Samoa Joe, Silverstein and Crosby gave it a "C+" rating for being "relatively slow". Rose said that it "was good while it lasted, but they've had better matches".

Crown Jewel was awarded WrestleCrap's Gooker Award, an annual booby prize for the worst gimmick, storyline, or event in wrestling. In their induction, the website stated that the event "was a bad idea from day one". The site also noted that if were not for the final three matches, Crown Jewel "would have been a passable, if completely tasteless, pay-per-view event". The event received awards in three negative categories at the annual Wrestling Observer Newsletter awards. The event itself was named Worst Major Wrestling Show, while the main event between The Brothers of Destruction and D-Generation X was named Worst Match of the Year. Furthermore, the business ties between Saudi Arabia and WWE were recognized as the Most Disgusting Promotional Tactic of the year. Shawn Michaels described the event as a "glorified house show" that was, in his opinion, insignificant.

== Aftermath ==
After his interference in the Universal Championship match, Braun Strowman sought revenge against Baron Corbin. After chasing him through the arena during the next Raw episode, Stephanie McMahon struck a bargain with him a week later: if he ceased attacking Corbin until after Survivor Series and led "Team Raw" to victory, he would be granted a match against Corbin and another Universal Championship match against Brock Lesnar, and could freely determine the stipulations in either match. At Survivor Series, Strowman eliminated four of the five members of Team SmackDown, leading his team to a decisive victory. On the following Raw, he was granted his match against Corbin at TLC: Tables, Ladders & Chairs, which he chose would be the namesake match. If Strowman won, he would be granted another Universal title match against Brock Lesnar at the Royal Rumble and Corbin would be stripped of all authority, but if Corbin won, he would become the permanent Raw General Manager. At TLC, an injured Strowman defeated Corbin with the assistance of Heath Slater, Apollo Crews, Finn Bálor, Bobby Roode, Chad Gable, and Kurt Angle, to challenge Lesnar again at the Royal Rumble and stripping Corbin of all authoritative power. However, as punishment for damaging Vince McMahon's limousine, he was stripped of his title opportunity, which was largely caused by Corbin, leading to a match at Elimination Chamber, which Corbin won thanks to assistance from Drew McIntyre and Bobby Lashley. On the following Raw, Strowman defeated Corbin in a tables match to end the feud.

The involvement of Shane McMahon in the WWE World Cup final was used as a build-up towards Survivor Series. It drew heavy kayfabe criticism from various wrestlers on the Raw roster. Acting Raw General Manager Baron Corbin accused Shane of stealing the World Cup from Raw and of having massively abused his power. The same statements were reiterated by Dolph Ziggler, who called Shane's actions a conspiracy, and his partner Drew McIntyre. Both wrestlers proclaimed Ziggler to be the "true best in the world". Furthermore, Stephanie McMahon called her brother's actions "an insult to the entire Raw locker room".

As The Miz had originally qualified for the final, he took credit for Shane's victory and subsequently demanded to captain "Team SmackDown" at Survivor Series, to which Shane McMahon and Paige obliged, naming him co-captain along with Daniel Bryan. Bryan and Miz then named Shane as part of "Team SmackDown" on the grounds of him winning the World Cup; Bryan was then removed from the match after winning the WWE Championship from AJ Styles. During the men's Survivor Series match, Shane eliminated Ziggler, who kept on referring to himself as the "best in the world", but could not help his team overcome Braun Strowman, who almost single-handedly eliminated most of his team. Altogether, SmackDown suffered a clean sweep on the pay-per-view, only winning the tag team match on the pre-show.

The Miz also began a pursuit to form a tag team with Shane McMahon, again painting Shane's win of the WWE World Cup as a team effort. However, their tag team, branded by Miz as "The Best Team in the World", lost its debut match to a duo of local competitors after a roll-up to Miz. At the Royal Rumble, Shane and Miz defeated The Bar (Cesaro and Sheamus) to win the SmackDown Tag Team Championship, holding the titles for three weeks, before losing to The Usos (Jey Uso and Jimmy Uso) at the Elimination Chamber pay-per-view. After failing to recapture the tag team championship the following month at Fastlane, Shane attacked The Miz, thus ending their partnership and turning heel for the first time since returning to WWE in 2016. Shane incorporated the "Best in the World" moniker and trophy as an integral part of his heel gimmick. The two fought at WrestleMania 35 in a falls count anywhere match and again at Money in the Bank in a Steel Cage match, in which Shane narrowly won both.

== Results ==
No.	Results	Stipulations	Times
1^{P}	Shinsuke Nakamura (c) defeated Rusev by pinfall	Singles match for the WWE United States Championship	9:30
2	Rey Mysterio defeated Randy Orton by pinfall	WWE World Cup quarter-final match	5:30
3	The Miz defeated Jeff Hardy by pinfall	WWE World Cup quarter-final match	7:05
4	Seth Rollins defeated Bobby Lashley (with Lio Rush) by pinfall	WWE World Cup quarter-final match	5:30
5	Dolph Ziggler (with Drew McIntyre) defeated Kurt Angle by pinfall	WWE World Cup quarter-final match	8:10
6	The Bar (Cesaro and Sheamus) (c) (with Big Show) defeated The New Day (Big E and Kofi Kingston) (with Xavier Woods) by pinfall	Tag team match for the WWE SmackDown Tag Team Championship	10:30
7	The Miz defeated Rey Mysterio by pinfall	WWE World Cup semifinal match	11:15
8	Dolph Ziggler (with Drew McIntyre) defeated Seth Rollins by pinfall	WWE World Cup semifinal match	13:05
9	AJ Styles (c) defeated Samoa Joe by pinfall	Singles match for the WWE Championship	11:15
10	Brock Lesnar (with Paul Heyman) defeated Braun Strowman by pinfall	Singles match for the vacant WWE Universal Championship	3:15
11	Shane McMahon defeated Dolph Ziggler by pinfall	WWE World Cup final match	2:30
12	D-Generation X (Triple H and Shawn Michaels) defeated The Brothers of Destruction (The Undertaker and Kane) by pinfall	Tag team match	27:45
(c) / – the champion(s) heading into the match; P / – the match was broadcast on the pre-show

=== WWE World Cup ===
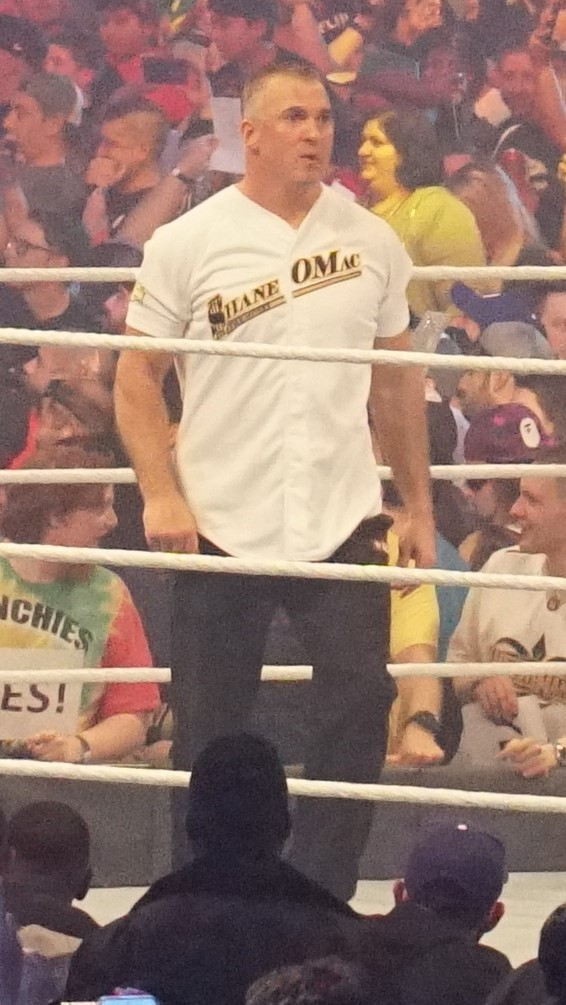
Shane McMahon, the winner of the WWE World Cup tournament.

The WWE World Cup was an eight-man single-elimination tournament to determine the "best in the world". Four participants came from Raw and four participants came from SmackDown. Participants from Raw and SmackDown faced opponents of their own brand until one member of their brand was left, after which, the finalist from Raw faced the finalist from SmackDown. John Cena was originally announced as a direct participant on account of his previous achievements in WWE, but was replaced by Bobby Lashley after he legitimately refused to work the show in wake of the Khashoggi incident.

1st Round; Crown Jewel; November 2, 2018
Seth Rollins	5:50
Bobby Lashley	Pinfall
Raw
Kurt Angle	Pinfall
Dolph Ziggler	8:10
Rey Mysterio	5:30
Randy Orton	Pinfall
SmackDown
Jeff Hardy	Pinfall
The Miz	7:05

Semifinals; Crown Jewel; November 2, 2018
Seth Rollins	Pinfall
Dolph Ziggler	13:05
Rey Mysterio	Pinfall
The Miz	11:15

Final; Crown Jewel; November 2, 2018
Dolph Ziggler	Pinfall
Shane McMahon (Note: Shane McMahon was a replacement for The Miz, who was ruled unable to compete.)	2:30

== See also ==
- 2018 in professional wrestling
