= Kayla Braxton =

American sports broadcaster

Personal information
- Born: Kayla Becker; June 7, 1991 (age 35) Wadley, Alabama, U.S.
- Education: Belmont University (BA)

Professional wrestling career
- Ring name: Kayla Braxton
- Debut: December 21, 2016
- Retired: June 28, 2024

Kayla Becker (born June 7, 1991) is an American sports broadcaster. She is best known for her time in WWE, where she worked as a backstage interviewer under the ring name Kayla Braxton.

== Early and personal life ==
Becker was born in Wadley, Alabama, on June 7, 1991. She is biracial. When she was nine years old, her mother was sent to prison; she subsequently grew up in a foster home. As a teenager, she participated in public speaking competitions. She graduated from Belmont University with a degree in broadcast journalism. During her time in college, she started creating online content and had a few digital entertainment shows for her school and around Nashville, Tennessee. Six months after she graduated, she began hosting her own entertainment web and TV segment in the top-20 television market in Orlando, Florida.

On March 4, 2021, Kayla revealed that she is bisexual.

== Career ==
=== WWE (2016–2024) ===
In October 2016, Becker signed with the American professional wrestling promotion WWE and was given the ring name Kayla Braxton. She debuted on the October 20, 2016 episode of NXT held in Lakeland, Florida as a host and ring announcer. She appeared on her first pay-per-view as a backstage interviewer during Backlash on May 21, 2017, and followed it up with appearances at Battleground 2017, SummerSlam 2017, Hell in a Cell 2017, and more PPVs. While working as a ring announcer on NXT, Braxton appeared on Raw, 205 Live and SmackDown where she would act as a ring announcer and backstage interviewer. She permanently left NXT on April 17, 2019, to the main roster and was replaced by Alicia Taylor the following week. Braxton was a backstage interviewer on SmackDown and co-host of The Bump. Since August 22, 2020, she has been the host of Talking Smack, which at that point was renamed to SmackDown LowDown, alongside Paul Heyman. On June 22, 2024, Braxton announced that she will be leaving WWE after the June 28 episode of SmackDown. On July 1, Braxton's profile on WWE's website was transferred to the alumni section. Kayla also appeared in the 2026 movie Paper Made as Alesha. Directed by Ryan Watson and filmed in Tampa, Florida.
