= Clash of Champions (2016) =

WWE pay-per-view and livestreaming event

- Promotional poster featuring Kevin Owens, Charlotte, Rusev, and The New Day (Kofi Kingston, Xavier Woods, and Big E)
- Promotion: WWE
- Brand: Raw
- Date: September 25, 2016
- City: Indianapolis, Indiana
- Venue: Bankers Life Fieldhouse
- Attendance: 13,467

WWE event chronology
← Previous; Cruiserweight Classic Finale	Next → No Mercy

Clash of Champions chronology
← Previous; First	Next → 2017

The 2016 Clash of Champions was a professional wrestling pay-per-view (PPV) and livestreaming event produced by WWE, held exclusively for wrestlers from the promotion's main roster brand, Raw. It was the inaugural Clash of Champions and took place on September 25, 2016, at the Bankers Life Fieldhouse in Indianapolis, Indiana. Clash of Champions replaced WWE's previously annual event, Night of Champions, and it was the first Raw-branded event following the reintroduction of the brand split in July 2016. Similar to Night of Champions, the theme of Clash of Champions was that all five active championships exclusive to Raw at the time were defended.

Eight matches were contested at the event, including one on the Kickoff pre-show. In the main event, Kevin Owens defeated Seth Rollins to retain the WWE Universal Championship. Of the five Raw-exclusive championships, only the United States Championship changed hands, with Roman Reigns defeating defending champion, Rusev.

== Production ==
=== Background ===
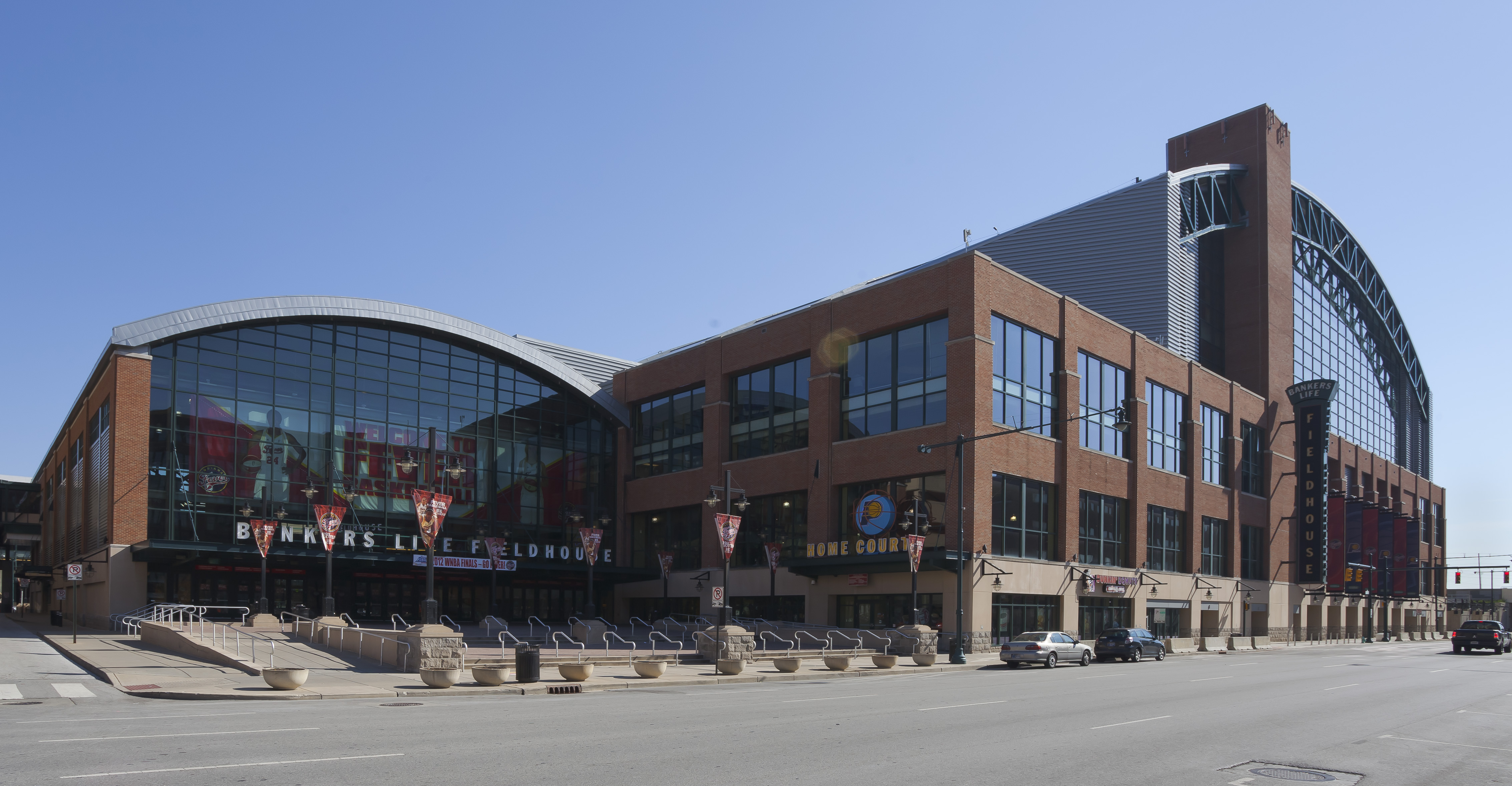
The inaugural Clash of Champions was held at the Bankers Life Fieldhouse in Indianapolis, Indiana.

From 2007 to 2015, WWE ran an annual event titled Night of Champions, a pay-per-view (PPV) and livestreaming event in which the concept was that every active main roster championship promoted by WWE during those years was defended. On February 23, 2016, WWE announced that the 10th annual Night of Champions would be held on September 25, 2016, at the Bankers Life Fieldhouse in Indianapolis, Indiana. However, in mid-2016, the promotion reintroduced the brand extension, again splitting its main roster between the Raw and SmackDown brands where wrestlers were exclusively assigned to perform. Along with the brand split came brand-exclusive PPVs. Night of Champions was in turn replaced by Clash of Champions, which was established as a Raw-exclusive PPV that year, and subsequently the first Raw-branded event of the second brand extension. In addition to traditional PPV, it was livestreamed on the WWE Network. Tickets went on sale on June 4 via Ticketmaster.

Clash of Champions was established on a similar concept as Night of Champions, with every active title exclusive to Raw at the time defended. For the inaugural 2016 event, these were the WWE Universal Championship, the Raw Women's Championship, the United States Championship, the Raw Tag Team Championship, and the WWE Cruiserweight Championship.

=== Storylines ===
The event comprised eight matches, including one on the Kickoff pre-show, that resulted from scripted storylines. Results were predetermined by WWE's writers on the Raw brand, while storylines were produced on WWE's weekly television show, Monday Night Raw.

At SummerSlam, Finn Bálor became the first WWE Universal Champion by defeating Seth Rollins. However, he was forced to vacate the championship the next night on Raw due to suffering a legit shoulder injury during the match. Rollins, Kevin Owens, Big Cass, and Roman Reigns all won matches to qualify for a fatal four-way elimination match the next week on Raw for the vacant Universal Championship. After Owens eliminated Cass, a returning Triple H helped Rollins eliminate Reigns, before turning on Rollins and helping Owens win the championship. The next week, Rollins turned face and attacked Owens during his celebration ceremony. Raw general manager Mick Foley then scheduled Owens to defend his championship against Rollins at Clash of Champions.

Rusev had been scheduled to defend the United States Championship against Roman Reigns at SummerSlam, but the match didn't happen because the two brawled before the match, with Reigns standing tall in the end. Having been deprived of his chance at the WWE Universal Championship in the four-way elimination match, Reigns confronted Owens on the September 5 episode of Raw. General Manager Mick Foley promised to add Reigns to the title match at Clash of Champions if he could defeat Owens in a non-title match the following week. Reigns lost the match, first by disqualification when Seth Rollins attacked Owens. Foley then restarted the match, but Rusev came down to the ring and distracted Reigns, allowing Owens to score a pinfall. The following week, a match between Rollins and Rusev, which had been booked as punishment for their interference the previous week, ended in a double countout. Reigns was then granted a rematch against Rusev for the U.S. title at Clash of Champions.

At SummerSlam, The New Day (Kofi Kingston and Xavier Woods) lost to Luke Gallows and Karl Anderson by disqualification when Big E returned from injury and interfered in the match. However, The New Day remained Raw Tag Team Champions. On the September 5 episode of Raw, a rematch was scheduled for Clash of Champions. On the September 12 episode, Kingston and Woods lost a non-title rematch against Gallows and Anderson.

At SummerSlam, Charlotte defeated Sasha Banks to regain the Raw Women's Championship. During the match, Banks suffered a legit back injury and then took time off to heal. On the September 5 episode of Raw, Bayley defeated Charlotte after a failed distraction from Charlotte's valet, Dana Brooke. Banks teased a retirement, but then revealed that she would be cleared to compete by Clash of Champions and invoked her rematch clause for the championship at the event. The next week, a confrontation between all four women led to a triple threat match to decide Charlotte's challenger at Clash of Champions. Banks defeated Bayley and Brooke to secure her title opportunity, but a week later, after replays showed Banks's shoulders being down as well as Bayley's when she pinned her, Bayley was added to the title match, making it a triple threat match.

On the September 12 episode of Raw, Sami Zayn was the guest on Chris Jericho's "Highlight Reel". After both men insulted each other, Jericho attacked Zayn with a cell phone and a Codebreaker. Later, a match between the two was scheduled for Clash of Champions.

A best of seven-series between Cesaro and Sheamus began at SummerSlam. Sheamus won the first three matches at SummerSlam and on the August 29 and September 5 episodes of Raw to lead the series 3–0. However, Cesaro won the next three matches on a September 7 house show and on the September 12 and 19 episodes of Raw to even the series at 3–3. The seventh match to decide the series was set for Clash of Champions.

T. J. Perkins won the inaugural Cruiserweight Classic and became the inaugural WWE Cruiserweight Champion by defeating Gran Metalik in the final. On the September 19 episode of Raw, The Brian Kendrick defeated Metalik, Cedric Alexander, and Rich Swann in a fatal four-way match to earn a title match against Perkins at Clash of Champions.

On the September 12 episode of Raw, a match between Alicia Fox and Nia Jax ended in a no contest when Jax tackled Fox through the barricade. On September 19, a rematch was scheduled for the Clash of Champions Kickoff pre-show.

== Event ==
Other on-screen personnel
Role:	Name:
English commentators	Michael Cole
English commentators	Corey Graves
English commentators	Byron Saxton
Spanish commentators	Carlos Cabrera
Spanish commentators	Marcelo Rodríguez
German commentators	Sebastian Hackl
German commentators	Carsten Schaefer
Ring announcer	JoJo
Referees	Chad Patton
Referees	Darrick Moore
Referees	John Cone
Referees	Rod Zapata
Interviewers	Tom Phillips
Interviewers	Andrea D'Marco
Pre-show panel	Renee Young
Pre-show panel	Booker T
Pre-show panel	Jerry Lawler
Pre-show panel	Lita

=== Pre-show ===
During the Clash of Champions Kickoff pre-show, Nia Jax faced Alicia Fox. During the match, Fox was able to hit Jax with a crossbody from the top rope and followed it up with a Scissors Kick, but Jax kicked out of the pin. The end came when Jax executed a Samoan Drop on Fox to win the match.

=== Preliminary matches ===
The actual pay-per-view opened with The New Day (Big E and Kofi Kingston) defending the Raw Tag Team Championship against Luke Gallows and Karl Anderson. In the end, Xavier Woods struck Anderson with The New Day's trombone, allowing Big E and Kingston to execute the "Midnight Hour" on him to retain the title.

Next, T. J. Perkins defended the WWE Cruiserweight Championship against The Brian Kendrick. Perkins forced Kendrick to submit to a Kneebar to retain the title. After the match, Perkins offered to shake hands with Kendrick, who responded with a headbutt.

After that, Cesaro faced Sheamus in the final match of the best-of-seven series. In the climax of the match, Cesaro performed a Clothesline on Sheamus, knocking them over the barricade. After the ringside doctor ruled that the match could not continue, the match was declared a no-contest.

In the fourth match, Chris Jericho faced Sami Zayn. The match ended when Jericho executed a "Codebreaker" on Zayn to win the match.

In the fifth match, Charlotte defended the Raw Women's Championship against Sasha Banks and Bayley. During the match, Banks applied the "Bank Statement" on Charlotte, but Bayley broke up the hold. Banks applied Bayley in the "Bank Statement", but Charlotte broke up the hold. In the end, Charlotte executed a "Queen's Boot" to Bayley, knocking her into Banks, who was on the ring apron. Charlotte executed another "Queen's Boot" on Bayley to retain the title.

Later, Rusev defended the United States Championship against Roman Reigns. During the match, Reigns performed a spear on Rusev, only for Lana to pull the referee out of the ring, for which she was ejected from ringside. As Rusev applied The Accolade on Reigns, Reigns escaped and executed a spear on Rusev to win the title.

=== Main event ===
In the main event, Kevin Owens defended the WWE Universal Championship against Seth Rollins. During the match, Owens attempted a Running Senton on Rollins through a broadcast table, but Rollins rolled off and Owens crashed through the table. Chris Jericho then appeared to distract the referee. Rollins executed a "Pedigree" on Owens, but Jericho placed Owens's foot on the bottom rope, avoiding the pinfall. Rollins chased Jericho and accidentally knocked down the referee. Rollins executed another "Pedigree" on Owens. but as the referee was still down and could not count the pinfall. Jericho attacked Rollins, who fought him off and executed suicide dives on both Jericho and Owens. Rollins tried to revive the official and Stephanie McMahon sent another referee to officiate the match. As Rollins re-entered the ring, Owens executed a Pop Up Powerbomb on Rollins to retain the title.

== Aftermath ==
Seth Rollins suffered a legitimate rib injury stemming from Kevin Owens's Gutbuster off the second rope, leading to him not being medically cleared to compete. A Hell in a Cell match between Rollins and Owens for the WWE Universal Championship would later be scheduled for Hell in a Cell.

The following night, Raw opened with a rematch between Roman Reigns and Rusev for the United States Championship. The match ended in a double countout. Afterwards, Reigns attacked Rusev with a chair, thus standing tall. The following week, Lana demanded another match, after which, Rusev attacked Reigns and tried to leave with the title belt, but Reigns attacked him with a Superman Punch and declared he would fight Rusev in a Hell in a Cell match, which was scheduled for Hell in a Cell.

Also on Raw, general manager Mick Foley would not allow further matches between Cesaro and Sheamus and decided to put them together as a team.

Sasha Banks demanded a one-on-one rematch for the Raw Women's Championship as she had not been pinned at Clash of Champions. Charlotte agreed to the rematch to take place the following week on Raw, where she lost the title to Banks. The following week, a rematch between the two for the title was scheduled for Hell in a Cell, which was further stipulated as a Hell in a Cell match.

The 2016 Clash of Champions would be the only in the event's chronology to be Raw-exclusive as the 2017 event was SmackDown-exclusive, and while a Clash of Champions event did not occur in 2018, brand-exclusive pay-per-views were discontinued that year following WrestleMania 34. The event returned in 2019, with all titles available to Raw, SmackDown, and 205 Live defended. The 2020 event just featured Raw and SmackDown as 205 Live merged under NXT in late 2019. This would be the final Clash of Champions as the originally planned 2021 event was canceled and replaced by that year's Extreme Rules. Clash of Champions was in turn quietly canceled without a new date for 2021 being scheduled.

== Results ==
No.	Results	Stipulations	Times
1^{P}	Nia Jax defeated Alicia Fox by pinfall	Singles match	4:55
2	The New Day (Big E and Kofi Kingston) (c) (with Xavier Woods) defeated Luke Gallows and Karl Anderson by pinfall	Tag team match for the WWE Raw Tag Team Championship	6:45
3	T. J. Perkins (c) defeated The Brian Kendrick by submission	Singles match for the WWE Cruiserweight Championship	10:31
4	Cesaro vs. Sheamus ended in a no-contest	Singles match Final match in the best of seven series Series tied 3–3	16:36
5	Chris Jericho defeated Sami Zayn by pinfall	Singles match	15:22
6	Charlotte (c) (with Dana Brooke) defeated Sasha Banks and Bayley by pinfall	Triple threat match for the WWE Raw Women's Championship	15:28
7	Roman Reigns defeated Rusev (c) (with Lana) by pinfall	Singles match for the WWE United States Championship	17:07
8	Kevin Owens (c) defeated Seth Rollins by pinfall	Singles match for the WWE Universal Championship	25:07
(c) / – the champion(s) heading into the match; P / – the match was broadcast on the pre-show
