= Clash of Champions (2017) =

WWE pay-per-view and livestreaming event

- Promotional poster featuring Charlotte Flair and AJ Styles
- Promotion: WWE
- Brand: SmackDown
- Date: December 17, 2017
- City: Boston, Massachusetts
- Venue: TD Garden
- Attendance: 14,318

WWE event chronology
← Previous; Survivor Series	Next → NXT TakeOver: Philadelphia

Clash of Champions chronology
← Previous; 2016	Next → 2019

The 2017 Clash of Champions was a professional wrestling pay-per-view (PPV) and livestreaming event produced by WWE, held exclusively for wrestlers from the promotion's main roster brand, SmackDown. It was the second annual Clash of Champions and took place on December 17, 2017, at TD Garden in Boston, Massachusetts. The theme of the event was that all four active championships exclusive to SmackDown at the time were defended.

Seven matches were contested at the event, including one on the Kickoff pre-show. In the main event, AJ Styles defeated Jinder Mahal to retain the WWE Championship. Of the four SmackDown-exclusive championships, only the United States Championship changed hands, with Dolph Ziggler defeating defending champion Baron Corbin and Bobby Roode in a triple threat match in the opening bout. In another marquee match, Kevin Owens and Sami Zayn defeated Randy Orton and Shinsuke Nakamura to keep their jobs in a match that featured both Shane McMahon and Daniel Bryan as the special guest referees.

An originally scheduled 2018 event was replaced by TLC: Tables, Ladders & Chairs due to the scheduling of the all-women's event Evolution in the late October slot that TLC was originally scheduled for, with TLC taking the place of Clash of Champions in December that year. Clash of Champions, however, was reinstated in 2019. This in turn made it the final brand-exclusive Clash of Champions as brand-exclusive PPV and livestreaming events for the main roster were discontinued following WrestleMania 34 in April 2018.

== Production ==
=== Background ===
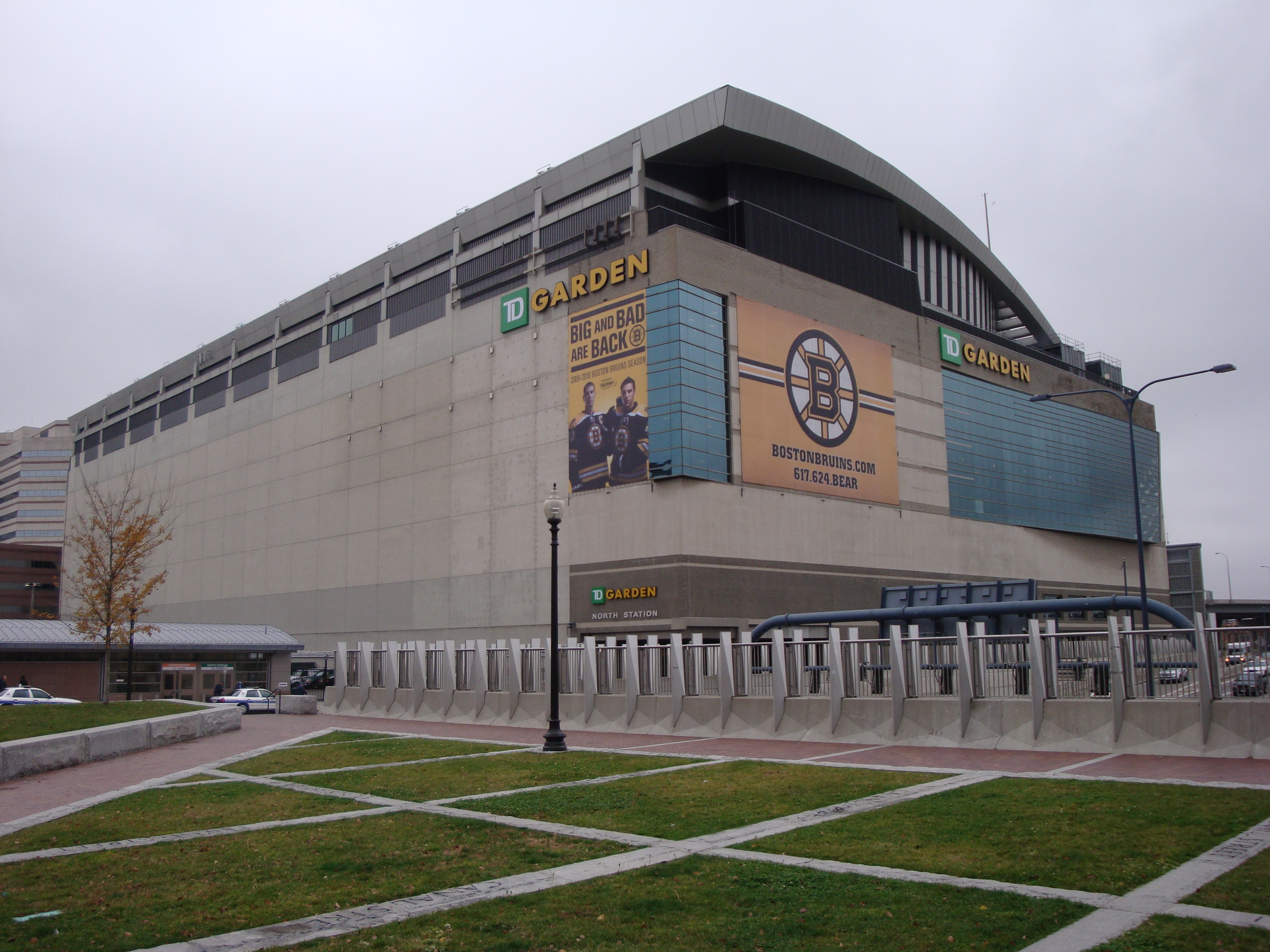
The second annual Clash of Champions was held at the TD Garden in Boston, Massachusetts.

In September 2016, WWE held Clash of Champions as a professional wrestling event, which aired via traditional pay-per-view (PPV) and was livestreamed on the WWE Network. It relaced Night of Champions that had been held annually since 2007, which had a concept in that all main roster championships promoted by WWE at the time were defended. Clash of Champions was held exclusively for wrestlers from the main roster brand, Raw, and was established on a similar concept as Night of Champions, but with only Raw's championships at the time defended.

A second Clash of Champions was announced on August 15, 2017, thus establishing Clash of Champions as an annual event. While the 2016 event was held in September, the 2017 event was moved to December and took place on December 17, 2017, at TD Garden in Boston, Massachusetts. It was also made a SmackDown-exclusive event, with all of its titles at the time defended. These were the WWE Championship, the SmackDown Women's Championship, the United States Championship, and the SmackDown Tag Team Championship. Tickets went on sale on September 29 through Ticketmaster.

=== Storylines ===
The event comprised seven matches, including one on the Kickoff pre-show, that resulted from scripted storylines. Results were predetermined by WWE's writers on the SmackDown brand, while storylines were produced on WWE's weekly television show, SmackDown Live.

On the November 7 episode of SmackDown, AJ Styles defeated Jinder Mahal to win the WWE Championship for the second time. This resulted in Styles taking Mahal's place in the Universal Champion versus WWE Champion match at Survivor Series against Raw's Brock Lesnar, which Styles lost. Mahal cut a promo during Survivor Series stating that he hoped that Styles would win for SmackDown, but he wanted Lesnar to weaken Styles so that he could easily win back the WWE Championship. The following SmackDown, Styles came out and addressed the fans. Mahal appeared on the TitanTron and challenged Styles to a rematch for the championship at Clash of Champions, which Styles accepted.

On the November 14 episode of SmackDown, Charlotte Flair defeated Natalya to win the SmackDown Women's Championship. This resulted in Flair taking Natalya's place in the Raw Women's Champion versus SmackDown Women's Champion match at Survivor Series against Raw's Alexa Bliss, which Flair won. Two days later on SmackDown, a rematch for the SmackDown Women's Championship was scheduled, but the match ended in a no contest after Flair and Natalya were attacked by the main roster debuts of NXT's Ruby Riott, Liv Morgan, and Sarah Logan, later referred to as The Riott Squad. On December 1 on WWE.com, in honoring the theme of the event, Byron Saxton announced that Flair and Natalya would have a SmackDown Women's Championship rematch at Clash of Champions. On the December 5 episode of SmackDown, Carmella and Lana, on behalf of Tamina, confronted General Manager Daniel Bryan and complained about Natalya getting a rematch for the title. They were then interrupted by The Riott Squad where Riott also complained. Due to their arguments, Bryan then decided to make the championship rematch between Flair and Natalya a lumberjack match with the six women serving as the lumberjacks. The following week, Flair faced Riott with Natalya on commentary, which Flair won by disqualification after Natalya attacked her. After the match, The Riott Squad attacked Flair. Naomi came out for the save, who was added as a lumberjack, followed by the other three lumberjacks, Carmella, Lana, and Tamina, who attacked The Riott Squad.

On the November 21 episode of SmackDown, during the Lumberjack match between The New Day's Big E and Kofi Kingston and Kevin Owens and Sami Zayn, United States Champion Baron Corbin accidentally hit Bobby Roode, which caused a brawl between all of the lumberjacks. The following week, while Roode was being interviewed by Charly Caruso, Corbin interrupted. Roode then issued a challenge to Corbin for the United States Championship, but Corbin denied his request. However, on December 1, it was announced that Corbin would defend the title in a triple threat match against Roode and Dolph Ziggler at Clash of Champions. The three confronted each other backstage the following week where Ziggler claimed he was added because he was a two-time world champion, a five-time Intercontinental Champion, a former United States Champion, and successfully cashed in his Money in the Bank briefcase, unlike Corbin, who failed to do so a few months prior.

On the October 10 episode of SmackDown, Chad Gable and Shelton Benjamin defeated The Hype Bros (Mojo Rawley and Zack Ryder), Breezango (Fandango and Tyler Breeze), and The Ascension (Konnor and Viktor) in a number one contender's fatal four-way tag team match. Gable and Benjamin received their SmackDown Tag Team Championship match on the November 7 episode of SmackDown and defeated champions The Usos (Jey Uso and Jimmy Uso), but by count-out, and as a result, The Usos retained the titles. A few weeks later, it was announced that The Usos would defend the SmackDown Tag Team Championship against The New Day and Gable and Benjamin in a triple threat tag team match at Clash of Champions. On the December 5 episode, Rusev and Aiden English were added to the match after defeating The New Day's Big E and Kingston, making it a fatal four-way tag team match.

Throughout the summer of 2017, Kevin Owens had issues with Commissioner Shane McMahon, which led to a Hell in a Cell match at Hell in a Cell where Sami Zayn appeared and helped Owens defeat Shane. On the following episode of SmackDown, Zayn explained that during the Superstar Shake-up, he was glad that he was brought to SmackDown, which had been called the "land of opportunity", but he never got an opportunity, and after Shane ignored his warning about facing Owens, he realized that Shane did not actually care about him and Shane only cared about himself and that was why he saved Owens. He said that despite their rough history, going from being best friends to bitter rivals, Owens was still his brother and he realized that Owens was right all along in his actions and thanked Owens. Shane appeared the following week and was confronted by Zayn, who said that he would take him out "in one second" if Shane wanted to compete again. Shane said they would eventually settle their score, but his focus then was on Survivor Series. Both Owens and Zayn were given the opportunity to represent Team SmackDown at Survivor Series, but lost their qualification matches. At Survivor Series, Owens and Zayn attacked Shane during the 5-on-5 Survivor Series interbrand elimination match against Team Raw, which SmackDown ultimately lost. A few weeks later, Shane decided that at Clash of Champions, Owens and Zayn would face Randy Orton and a partner of his choosing, who Orton later revealed would be Shinsuke Nakamura. Afterwards, Shane announced himself as the special guest referee while also putting an additional stipulation that if Owens and Zayn were to lose at Clash of Champions, they would be fired from WWE. On the final SmackDown before Clash of Champions, General Manager Daniel Bryan decided to add himself as a second special guest referee to keep the match fair.

For months on Breezango's "Fashion Files" segment, Fandango and Tyler Breeze were tormented by two unknown individuals. Breezango thought that it may have been The Ascension (Konnor and Viktor), however, The Ascension joined with Breezango and after finding a clue with "2B" written on it, they deduced that the unknown duo were The Bludgeon Brothers, who were being promoted as "coming soon" to SmackDown. The Bludgeon Brothers, the new team of former Wyatt Family members Luke Harper and Erick Rowan, now going by the shortened ring names of Harper and Rowan, debuted on the November 21 episode of SmackDown, and after The Ascension "sacrificed" themselves, they convinced Breezango to face The Bludgeon Brothers at Clash of Champions.

On the November 21 episode of SmackDown, The Hype Bros (Mojo Rawley and Zack Ryder) were defeated by The Bludgeon Brothers (Harper and Rowan). The following week, The Hype Bros lost to The Bludgeon Brothers once more. Following the match, a frustrated Rawley attacked Ryder. The following week, Rawley explained that he was doing good as a singles competitor, citing that he had won the André the Giant Memorial Battle Royal at WrestleMania 33 earlier in April, without Ryder, but after Ryder came back from his injury in June, he got dragged back into resuming a tag team with Ryder again. The two went back and forth on social media and on December 12, Ryder challenged Rawley to a match at Clash of Champions, which was accepted by Rawley through his Twitter and the match was scheduled for the Kickoff pre-show.

== Event ==
Other on-screen personnel
Role:	Name:
English commentators	Tom Phillips
English commentators	Corey Graves
English commentators	Byron Saxton
Spanish commentators	Carlos Cabrera
Spanish commentators	Marcelo Rodríguez
German commentators	Tim Haber
German commentators	Calvin Knie
Ring announcer	Greg Hamilton
Referees	Jason Ayers
Referees	Daniel Bryan
Referees	Mike Chioda
Referees	Dan Engler
Referees	Shane McMahon
Referees	Charles Robinson
Interviewers	Dasha Fuentes
Interviewers	Kayla Braxton
Pre-show panel	Renee Young
Pre-show panel	Sam Roberts
Pre-show panel	David Otunga
Talking Smack panel	Renee Young
Talking Smack panel	Sam Roberts

=== Pre-show ===
During the Clash of Champions Kickoff pre-show, Mojo Rawley faced his former tag team partner Zack Ryder. In the end, Rawley executed a running forearm smash on Ryder, who was cornered, for the victory.

=== Preliminary matches ===
The actual pay-per-view opened with Baron Corbin defending the United States Championship in a triple threat match against Bobby Roode and Dolph Ziggler. As Corbin executed the "End of Days" on Roode, Ziggler simultaneously performed a "Zig-Zag" on Corbin to win his second U.S. Championship.

Next, The Usos defended the SmackDown Tag Team Championship against Big E and Kofi Kingston of The New Day, Rusev and Aiden English, and Shelton Benjamin and Chad Gable in a fatal four-way match. Unlike traditional fatal four-way tag team matches, one member from each team remained in the ring throughout the match. The match ended when Jimmy performed two superkicks on Gable and Jey performed a "Samoan Splash" on Gable to retain the titles.

After that, Charlotte Flair defended the SmackDown Women's Championship against Natalya in a lumberjack match with The Riott Squad (Ruby Riott, Liv Morgan, and Sarah Logan), Naomi, Carmella, Tamina, and Lana serving as the lumberjacks. After Charlotte performed a moonsault to the outside taking out all the lumberjacks, Carmella attempted to cash-in her Money in the Bank briefcase, but Riott stopped her and the lumberjacks brawled into the back. As Natalya attempted the "Sharpshooter", Flair countered it into the "Figure-Eight Leg Lock" and forced Natalya to submit, thus Charlotte retained the title. After the match, an upset Natalya said she was turning her back on everyone.

Later, The Bludgeon Brothers (Harper and Rowan) faced Breezango (Fandango and Tyler Breeze). In a squash match, Harper and Rowan performed a double crucifix powerbomb on Fandango, with Rowan pinning Fandango for the win. Afterwards, they cut a promo saying that, "it was the end of the beginning and the beginning of the end".

In the penultimate match, Kevin Owens and Sami Zayn defended their jobs against Randy Orton and Shinsuke Nakamura with Commissioner Shane McMahon and General Manager Daniel Bryan as the special guest referees. Throughout the match, there was confusion between Shane and Bryan on who should call the pinfalls until they came to an agreement, each claiming halves of the ring. Outside the ring, Owens performed a frog splash on Nakamura through an announce table. In the climax, Zayn attempted to pin Orton with a roll-up, but Shane intentionally stopped the count at two. Bryan and Shane then argued, during which Bryan shoved Shane. Orton attempted an "RKO" on Zayn, who avoided it, and then pinned Orton with a roll-up. Bryan made a fast count to give Owens and Zayn the win, thus keeping their jobs.

=== Main event ===
In the main event, AJ Styles defended the WWE Championship against Jinder Mahal. Styles performed a springboard 450° splash on Mahal, only for The Singh Brothers (Samir and Sunil Singh) to pull Mahal out of the ring. Styles performed a "Phenomenal Forearm" on Sunil, who was outside the ring, and a "Styles Clash" on Samir on the floor. As Styles attempted another springboard, Mahal avoided it and performed the "Khallas" on Styles for a near-fall. In the end, Mahal attempted his own "Styles Clash" on Styles, but Styles blocked and forced Mahal to submit to the "Calf Crusher" to retain the title.

== Aftermath ==
On the following episode of SmackDown, General Manager Daniel Bryan and Commissioner Shane McMahon confronted each other about the controversial finish to the tag team match at Clash of Champions. Shane said that he stopped his three count because of his emotions as he remembered all the wrongs that Kevin Owens and Sami Zayn had done on SmackDown. Shane then asked why Bryan made a fast count. Bryan said he was trying to protect Shane from himself. Bryan said he became General Manager because he believed in the shared vision that SmackDown was the "land of opportunity", and Shane was trying to take that away from Owens and Zayn. Shane said to be careful as Owens and Zayn would turn on him. Bryan said that Shane was sounding like The Authority and wanted to prevent Shane from turning into his father, Vince McMahon. Bryan said to fire himself if Shane was going to fire anyone. Shane paused for a moment to process, said he trusted Bryan, and wished him good luck with the show and left. WWE Champion AJ Styles would then get intertwined into this feud, resulting in Bryan scheduling Styles to defend the WWE Championship against both Owens and Zayn at the Royal Rumble in a 2-on-1 handicap match, while Randy Orton and Shinsuke Nakamura announced their participation in the Royal Rumble match.

Also on the following episode of SmackDown, new United States Champion Dolph Ziggler cut a promo addressing the fans and his championship win. Clips of Ziggler's past accomplishments and championship wins were shown on the TitanTron. Ziggler then said that the fans did not deserve him. He dropped the title and left it in the ring and left. The following week, after unsuccessful attempts of contacting Ziggler, General Manager Daniel Bryan vacated the United States Championship and announced a tournament to crown a new champion, which was won by Bobby Roode, who defeated Jinder Mahal in the tournament final on the January 16, 2018, episode. Other participants of the tournament included former champion Baron Corbin, Tye Dillinger, Xavier Woods, Aiden English, Mojo Rawley, and Zack Ryder.

On the December 18 episode of Raw, Raw Commissioner Stephanie McMahon announced that the 2018 Royal Rumble would feature the first-ever women's Royal Rumble match. On SmackDown, SmackDown Women's Champion Charlotte Flair first addressed her victory over Natalya at Clash of Champions, then said that she would be waiting for the winner of the women's Royal Rumble match at WrestleMania 34. Naomi came out and became the first woman to announce her participation. They were then interrupted by The Riott Squad. Before they could announce their participation, Naomi stopped them and challenged two of them to a tag team match between her and Flair. Ruby Riott and Sarah Logan represented the Squad, but were defeated.

In the tag team division, Chad Gable and Shelton Benjamin got a clean win over SmackDown Tag Team Champions The Usos in a non-title match. Gable and Benjamin received a tag team championship match on the January 2, 2018, episode and defeated The Usos, however, Jimmy, who was pinned, was not the legal man, and the match was restarted in which The Usos won. A rematch was scheduled for the Royal Rumble in a two out of three falls match.

Also in the tag team division, Breezango faced The Bludgeon Brothers in a rematch from Clash of Champions which ended in disqualification after interference from The Ascension. Another rematch was to happen the following week, but The Bludgeon Brothers dismantled both Breezango and The Ascension.

A 2018 event was originally scheduled for December 16 in San Jose, California, but it was replaced by TLC: Tables, Ladders & Chairs due to the scheduling of the all-women's event Evolution in the late October slot that TLC was originally scheduled for, with TLC instead taking the date and location of the originally scheduled 2018 Clash of Champions. As a result, the 2017 Clash of Champions was the last to be brand-exclusive, as following WrestleMania 34 in April 2018, brand-exclusive PPV and livestreaming events for the main roster were discontinued. Clash of Champions was then reinstated in 2019 and featured Raw, SmackDown, and 205 Live, the latter of which was established as a separate brand from Raw after WrestleMania 34, although in 2020, Clash of Champions just featured Raw and SmackDown as 205 Live merged under WWE's developmental brand, NXT, in late 2019.

== Results ==
No.	Results	Stipulations	Times
1^{P}	Mojo Rawley defeated Zack Ryder by pinfall	Singles match	6:55
2	Dolph Ziggler defeated Baron Corbin (c) and Bobby Roode by pinfall	Triple threat match for the WWE United States Championship	12:45
3	The Usos (Jey Uso and Jimmy Uso) (c) defeated The New Day (Big E and Kofi Kingston) (with Xavier Woods), Chad Gable and Shelton Benjamin, and Rusev and Aiden English by pinfall	Fatal four-way tag team match for the WWE SmackDown Tag Team Championship	12:00
4	Charlotte Flair (c) defeated Natalya by submission	Lumberjack match^{a} for the WWE SmackDown Women's Championship	10:35
5	The Bludgeon Brothers (Harper and Rowan) defeated Breezango (Fandango and Tyler Breeze) by pinfall	Tag team match	1:55
6	Kevin Owens and Sami Zayn defeated Randy Orton and Shinsuke Nakamura by pinfall	Tag team match with Shane McMahon and Daniel Bryan as special guest referees Had Owens and Zayn lost, they would have been fired from WWE.	21:40
7	AJ Styles (c) defeated Jinder Mahal (with The Singh Brothers) by submission	Singles match for the WWE Championship	23:00
(c) / – the champion(s) heading into the match; P / – the match was broadcast on the pre-show

^aLumberjacks: Carmella, Lana, Naomi, The Riott Squad (Ruby Riott, Liv Morgan, and Sarah Logan), and Tamina
