= WWE Clash of Champions =

WWE pay-per-view and livestreaming event series

- WWE Clash of Champions logo
- Promotions: WWE
- Brands: Raw (2016, 2019–2020); SmackDown (2017, 2019–2020); 205 Live (2019)
- First event: 2016
- Last event: 2020
- Event gimmick: All active WWE championships available to each brand featured at the event were defended

WWE Clash of Champions was a professional wrestling event produced by WWE, a Connecticut-based professional wrestling promotion. It was broadcast live and available only through pay-per-view (PPV) and the livestreaming service, the WWE Network. The event was established in 2016 and replaced Night of Champions in the late September slot of WWE's pay-per-view calendar. The event was moved to December in 2017, but returned to the September slot after the event was reinstated in 2019. An event was originally scheduled for 2021 but was canceled and replaced by that year's Extreme Rules event. Similar to Night of Champions, the theme of the event was that all active WWE championships available to each brand division featured at the event were defended.

To coincide with the brand extension, which was reintroduced in mid-2016, the inaugural Clash of Champions was held exclusively for wrestlers from the Raw brand and was the first Raw-exclusive PPV of the second brand split. The 2017 event was in turn SmackDown-exclusive. Brand-exclusive PPVs were then discontinued following WrestleMania 34 in 2018, thus the 2019 event featured Raw, SmackDown, and 205 Live, while the 2020 event just featured Raw and SmackDown after 205 Live merged under NXT in late 2019.

In total, 11 different WWE championships were defended at Clash of Champions over its four events. Only one of those 11 championships was contested at every event, which was the WWE United States Championship, although for 2019, it was on the event's pre-show.

== History ==
Clash of Champions was established by WWE in 2016 and it replaced their previously annual pay-per-view, Night of Champions, which had run from 2007 to 2015 (although it was reinstated in 2023). That event had a theme in which every active championship on WWE's main roster during those years were defended; Clash of Champions was established on a similar concept. The inaugural event was held exclusively for the Raw brand following the reintroduction of the brand extension in July 2016, where the promotion again split its roster into separate brands where the wrestlers were exclusively assigned to perform. This first event was held on September 25 that year and was the very first Raw-branded event of the second brand extension. The following year, the event was held as a SmackDown-branded event and was pushed back to December.

In 2018, WWE discontinued brand-exclusive pay-per-views following WrestleMania 34. A Clash of Champions event was originally announced to be held that year, but it was later canceled and replaced by the all-female event, Evolution. In 2019, Clash of Champions was reinstated for the September slot. As the event was no longer brand-exclusive, the 2019 event featured the Raw, SmackDown, and 205 Live brands, but after 205 Live merged under NXT in October 2019, the 2020 event only featured Raw and SmackDown. Due to the COVID-19 pandemic, the 2020 event was held behind closed doors in WWE's bio-secure bubble, the WWE ThunderDome, hosted at the Amway Center in Orlando, Florida.

An event for 2021 was originally scheduled to be held on September 26 at the Nationwide Arena in Columbus, Ohio. However, on July 9, 2021, WWE announced that Extreme Rules would instead take place on that date at that venue due to WWE rescheduling Money in the Bank to take place on Extreme Rules' original July date. Clash of Champions itself was quietly canceled.

== Concept ==
The concept of Clash of Champions was that all active WWE championships available to each brand division featured at the event were defended. For example, the inaugural event was a Raw-exclusive pay-per-view, as such, only the titles exclusive to Raw at the time were defended. After brand-exclusive pay-per-views were discontinued in 2018 and after the establishment of two non-brand exclusive championships in 2019, every title available to each brand featured on the event were defended. For example, in 2019, the event featured Raw, SmackDown, and 205 Live, so all the championships available to those three brands at the time were defended.

Although the event was centered around championship matches, non-championship matches occurred at the 2016, 2017, and 2019 events. In 2020, every match on the card was a championship match. With a total of 11 championships at the 2019 event, two titles were defended on the Kickoff pre-show to reduce the actual pay-per-view's runtime. The 2020 event had one championship match occur on the pre-show. In total, 11 different WWE championships were defended at the pay-per-view over its four events.

Pre-show match

All WWE championships that were defended at Clash of Champions
Year	WWE	Universal	Raw Women's	SmackDown Women's	Intercontinental	United States	Raw Tag Team	SmackDown Tag Team	Women's Tag Team	24/7	Cruiserweight
2016	✗	✓	✓	✗	✗	✓	✓	✗	✗	✗	✓
2017	✓	✗	✗	✓	✗	✓	✗	✓	✗	✗	✗
2019	✓	✓	✓	✓	✓	✓	✓	✓	✓	✓	✓
2020	✓	✓	✓	✓	✓	✓	✓	✓	✗	✓	✗

Notes

- The WWE United States Championship was the only championship to be defended at every Clash of Champions event. This was due to WWE's annual draft, which was also why the WWE Intercontinental Championship was not featured during the first two years. In the 2016 WWE Draft, the United States Championship was made exclusive to Raw and the Intercontinental Championship was made exclusive to SmackDown, thus the United States Championship was featured at the inaugural Clash of Champions event, which was Raw-exclusive. During the 2017 WWE Superstar Shake-up, the two titles switched brands, and thus the United States Championship was also featured on that year's Clash of Champions as it was SmackDown-exclusive. With the discontinuation of brand-exclusive pay-per-views in 2018, the United States Championship, as well as most of the other championships, were featured each year since the event was reinstated in 2019 before being canceled in 2021.
- The WWE Cruiserweight Championship was part of the Raw brand in 2016, but became exclusive to 205 Live in 2018 with 205 Live also being featured on the 2019 event. Soon after the 2019 event, 205 Live was merged under the NXT brand and the title was renamed to NXT Cruiserweight Championship and was no longer featured at Clash of Champions, as NXT ran its own separate shows.
- The WWE Women's Tag Team Championship was introduced in February 2019, available to the Raw and SmackDown brands. It was originally scheduled to be defended at the 2020 event, but just before the event, the defending champions were not medically cleared to compete, thus the title match was canceled.
- The WWE 24/7 Championship was introduced in May 2019 with a special rule in that it could be defended any time, anywhere, as long as a WWE referee was present, thus making it available to all of WWE's brands. As a result of this rule, the championship was rarely defended in sanctioned matches. It often changed hands by a sneak attack and a roll up pin, generally backstage at events. This was the case for the 24/7 Championship at Clash of Champions in 2019 and 2020.

== Locations ==
Locations for Clash of Champions venues.

== Events ==
Raw-branded event	SmackDown-branded event

#	Event	Date	City	Venue	Main event	Ref.
1	Clash of Champions (2016)	September 25, 2016	Indianapolis, Indiana	Bankers Life Fieldhouse	Kevin Owens (c) vs. Seth Rollins for the WWE Universal Championship	
2	Clash of Champions (2017)	December 17, 2017	Boston, Massachusetts	TD Garden	AJ Styles (c) vs. Jinder Mahal for the WWE Championship	
3	Clash of Champions (2019)	September 15, 2019	Charlotte, North Carolina	Spectrum Center	Seth Rollins (c) vs. Braun Strowman for the WWE Universal Championship	
4	Clash of Champions (2020)	September 27, 2020	Orlando, Florida	WWE ThunderDome at Amway Center	Roman Reigns (c) vs. Jey Uso for the WWE Universal Championship	
(c) – refers to the champion(s) heading into the match
