= Clash of Champions (2019) =

WWE pay-per-view and livestreaming event

- Promotional poster featuring Becky Lynch, Bayley, Kofi Kingston, AJ Styles, and Seth Rollins
- Promotion: WWE
- Brand(s): Raw; SmackDown; 205 Live
- Date: September 15, 2019
- City: Charlotte, North Carolina
- Venue: Spectrum Center

WWE event chronology
← Previous; NXT UK TakeOver: Cardiff	Next → Hell in a Cell

Clash of Champions chronology
← Previous; 2017	Next → 2020

The 2019 Clash of Champions was a professional wrestling pay-per-view (PPV) and livestreaming event produced by WWE, held for wrestlers from the promotion's main roster brands, Raw, SmackDown, and 205 Live. It was the third Clash of Champions and took place on September 15, 2019, at Spectrum Center in Charlotte, North Carolina. The theme of the event was that all 11 of WWE's active main roster championships at the time were defended.

Eleven matches were contested at the event, including two on the Kickoff pre-show, as well as an impromptu WWE 24/7 Championship defense. In the main event, Seth Rollins defeated Braun Strowman to retain Raw's Universal Championship. In other prominent matches, Kofi Kingston retained SmackDown's WWE Championship against Randy Orton, Bayley defeated Charlotte Flair to retain the SmackDown Women's Championship, and the Raw Women's Championship match between Becky Lynch and Sasha Banks ended in a disqualification win for Banks, but with Lynch retaining as titles do not change hands on disqualification unless stipulated. In the only non-title match on the card, Erick Rowan defeated Roman Reigns in a No Disqualification match thanks to the returning Luke Harper.

This was the first Clash of Champions held since 2017 as an originally planned 2018 event was replaced by that year's TLC: Tables, Ladders & Chairs due to the scheduling of the all-women's event Evolution. As a result, this was the first Clash of Champions to feature multiple brands, as although the 2017 event was held exclusively for SmackDown, brand-exclusive PPV and livestreaming events for the main roster were discontinued after WrestleMania 34 in April 2018. This also returned Clash of Champions to September after the 2017 event was held in December. It was also the only to feature 205 Live, which merged under NXT the following month, subsequently being the last main roster PPV and livestreaming event to feature 205 Live.

== Production ==
=== Background ===
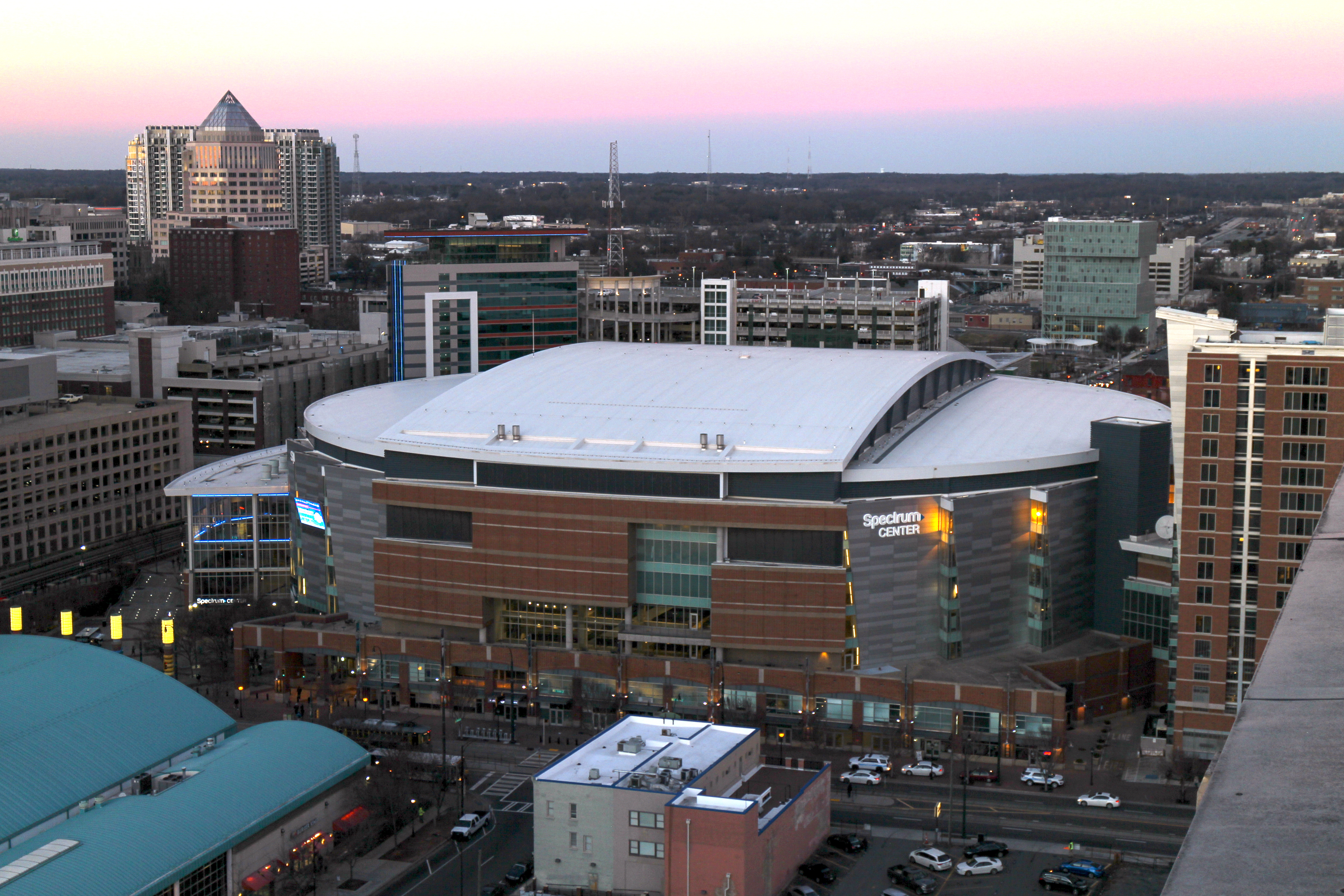
The third Clash of Champions was held at the Spectrum Center in Charlotte, North Carolina.

Clash of Champions was a professional wrestling pay-per-view (PPV) and livestreaming event first produced by WWE in 2016. The theme of the event was that all active championships available to each brand division featured at the event were defended. The 2016 event was Raw-exclusive while the 2017 event was SmackDown-exclusive. Clash of Champions did not occur in 2018, as an originally planned event was replaced by TLC: Tables, Ladders & Chairs due to the scheduling of the all-women's event Evolution. On June 17, 2019, Clash of Champions was reinstated for September 15, 2019, at the Spectrum Center in Charlotte, North Carolina, returning the event to September after the 2017 event was held in December. It aired on PPV worldwide and was available to livestream on the WWE Network. Tickets went on sale on June 21 through Ticketmaster.

Due to the discontinuation of brand-exclusive PPV and livestreaming events for the main roster following WrestleMania 34 in April 2018, the event featured wrestlers from Raw, SmackDown, and 205 Live, the latter of which was also established in 2018. As per the theme of the event, all 11 of WWE's active main roster titles available across the three brands were defended. These included the four championships on Raw—the Universal Championship, the Raw Women's Championship, the United States Championship, and the Raw Tag Team Championship—the four championships on SmackDown—the WWE Championship, the SmackDown Women's Championship, the Intercontinental Championship, and the SmackDown Tag Team Championship—205 Live's sole championship—the WWE Cruiserweight Championship—and the promotion's two non-exclusive titles—the WWE Women's Tag Team Championship and the WWE 24/7 Championship.

=== Storylines ===
The event comprised 11 matches, including two on the Kickoff pre-show, which resulted from scripted storylines. Results were predetermined by WWE's writers on the Raw, SmackDown, and 205 Live brands, while storylines were produced on WWE's weekly television shows, Monday Night Raw, SmackDown Live, and the cruiserweight-exclusive 205 Live.

On the August 12 episode of Raw, Universal Champion Seth Rollins faced United States Champion and O.C. member AJ Styles in a non-title champion versus champion match, which resulted in a brawl with fellow O.C. members Luke Gallows and Karl Anderson with Braun Strowman coming to Rollins's aid. The following week, Rollins and Strowman defeated Gallows and Anderson to win the Raw Tag Team Championship. Rollins was then scheduled to defend both the Universal and Raw Tag Team championships at Clash of Champions. On the August 26 episode of Raw, Robert Roode and Dolph Ziggler won a Tag Team Turmoil to earn a Raw Tag Team Championship match at the event, while later that same night, Strowman challenged Rollins for the Universal Championship, which Rollins accepted.

At SummerSlam, Becky Lynch defeated Natalya in a submission match to retain the Raw Women's Championship. On the following Raw, Lynch stated she respected Natalya and put out a warning to the rest of the women's division. Natalya later came out with her arm in a sling and stated they would face each other again. She was then interrupted by the returning Sasha Banks in her first appearance since WrestleMania 35 in April. Banks and Natalya embraced only for Banks to attack Natalya, thus turning heel. Lynch came to Natalya's aid but was attacked by Banks with a chair. On the September 2 episode, after defeating Natalya a week prior, Banks challenged Lynch for the title at Clash of Champions, and Lynch accepted.

During the WWE Championship match at SummerSlam, Randy Orton attempted to target Kofi Kingston's family, who were at ringside. Kingston brawled with Orton outside the ring, resulting in both men being counted out; thus Kingston retained the title, but he continued to attack Orton. On the following episode of SmackDown, The New Day (Kingston and SmackDown Tag Team Champions Big E and Xavier Woods) faced the team of Orton and The Revival (Scott Dawson and Dash Wilder) in which the latter won, after which, Orton performed an RKO on all three members of New Day. On the following Raw, Big E and Woods defeated The Revival via disqualification due to interference from Orton. Kingston came to their aid only for Orton to attack Kingston, while The Revival and Orton temporarily injured Woods's leg. On August 27, a WWE Championship rematch was scheduled between Kingston and Orton for Clash of Champions, while Big E and Woods were scheduled to defend the SmackDown Tag Team Championship against The Revival at the event.

Feeling that she deserved an opportunity for the SmackDown Women's Championship for her win over Trish Stratus at SummerSlam, Charlotte Flair issued a challenge to reigning champion Bayley during "A Moment of Bliss" on the August 20 episode of SmackDown. Bayley accepted the challenge for Clash of Champions.

On the August 20 episode of SmackDown, Sami Zayn was a guest on "Miz TV". Zayn stated that after months of losing matches, he realized that he would be better suited to helping people on SmackDown and introduced his first client, Intercontinental Champion Shinsuke Nakamura. The Miz questioned why Nakamura would associate himself with Zayn, who said that Nakamura was unable to express himself because of the language barrier and that he would communicate for Nakamura. Miz then received a beatdown from Nakamura and Zayn. The following week, Miz challenged Nakamura for the Intercontinental Championship at Clash of Champions and Miz received yet another beatdown. Later, the title match was made official.

As Roman Reigns was getting ready to announce his SummerSlam opponent on the July 30 episode of SmackDown, an unidentified person pushed lighting equipment on top of Reigns backstage. The attacker was originally alleged to be Samoa Joe due to their previous rivalry, however, Joe was proven innocent during a hit and run on Reigns in which Joe was a witness. Buddy Murphy then became a suspect as he was spotted in the background in the footage of the original attack, prompting Reigns to confront Murphy backstage. After Reigns brawled with Murphy, Murphy eventually revealed that the attacker was Erick Rowan. On the SummerSlam Kickoff pre-show, Rowan attacked Murphy for the accusation. Rowan and his tag team partner Daniel Bryan then forced Murphy to claim that he was lying and Bryan and Rowan conducted their own investigation to find out that Reigns's attacker was a doppelganger of Rowan. However, Reigns found additional footage that showed Rowan pushing over the equipment. This caused Bryan and Rowan to split due to Rowan lying, and a match between Reigns and Rowan was scheduled for Clash of Champions. On the September 10 episode, after Reigns and Rowan brawled throughout the arena with Rowan standing tall after striking Reigns with a jib camera, the match stipulation was changed to a No Disqualification match.

On the August 5 episode of Raw, Alexa Bliss and Nikki Cross defeated defending champions The IIconics (Peyton Royce and Billie Kay), The Kabuki Warriors (Asuka and Kairi Sane), and Mandy Rose and Sonya Deville in a fatal four-way tag team elimination match to win the WWE Women's Tag Team Championship. On the September 3 episode of SmackDown, Rose and Deville challenged Bliss and Cross for the title at Clash of Champions. Bliss claimed that they did not deserve an opportunity, however, Cross accepted a non-title match for that night, which Rose and Deville won. A title match was then scheduled between the two teams for Clash of Champions.

On the September 9 episode of Raw, Cedric Alexander faced O.C. member AJ Styles for the United States Championship, only for the match to end via disqualification due to interference from fellow O.C. members, Luke Gallows and Karl Anderson. Later that night, Alexander pinned Styles in a 10-man tag team match. Styles was then scheduled to defend the title in a rematch against Alexander on the Clash of Champions Kickoff pre-show.

On the August 20 episode of 205 Live, Team Oney Lorcan won the Captain's Challenge against Team Drew Gulak with Humberto Carrillo and Lorcan being the last remaining members of their team. The following week, 205 Live General Manager Drake Maverick scheduled Carrillo and Lorcan to compete in a number one contender's match to face Gulak for the WWE Cruiserweight Championship on the Clash of Champions Kickoff pre-show, which Carrillo won. On the September 3 episode, Lince Dorado defeated Carrillo, thus making it a triple threat match for the title.

=== Canceled and rescheduled match ===
In August 2019, the King of the Ring tournament was revived—the first time since the 2015 tournament—with the finals originally scheduled for Clash of Champions. However, on September 11, the finals were rescheduled for the September 16 episode of Raw, where Raw's Baron Corbin defeated SmackDown's Chad Gable to become the King of the Ring, thus changing his ring name to King Corbin.

== Event ==
Other on-screen personnel
Role:	Name:
Commentators	Michael Cole (Raw)
Commentators	Corey Graves (Raw/SmackDown)
Commentators	Renee Young (Raw)
Commentators	Tom Phillips (SmackDown)
Commentators	Byron Saxton (SmackDown)
Commentators	Vic Joseph (205 Live)
Commentators	Aiden English (205 Live)
Commentators	Dio Maddin (205 Live)
Spanish commentators	Carlos Cabrera
Spanish commentators	Marcelo Rodríguez
German commentators	Carsten Schaefer
German commentators	Tim Haber
German commentators	Calvin Knie
Ring announcers	Greg Hamilton (SmackDown/205 Live)
Ring announcers	Mike Rome (Raw)
Referees	Danilo Anfibio
Referees	Jason Ayers
Referees	John Cone
Referees	Dan Engler
Referees	Darrick Moore
Referees	Eddie Orengo
Referees	Charles Robinson
Interviewers	Charly Caruso
Interviewers	Kayla Braxton
Interviewers	Sarah Schreiber
Pre-show panel	Jonathan Coachman
Pre-show panel	Charly Caruso
Pre-show panel	David Otunga
Pre-show panel	Booker T

=== Pre-show ===
Two matches were contested on the Clash of Champions Kickoff pre-show. In the first match, Drew Gulak defended the Cruiserweight Championship against Humberto Carrillo and Lince Dorado in a triple threat match. In the end, Carrillo performed an Aztec press on Dorado, however, Gulak threw Carrillo into the ring post and pinned Dorado to retain the title.

In the second pre-show match, The O.C's AJ Styles defended the United States Championship against Cedric Alexander. At the start of the match, Alexander performed a Michinoku Driver on Styles for a nearfall. After Alexander managed another nearfall, the momentum shifted when Styles intercepted Alexander's springboard attempt. Styles then suplexed Alexander on the ring apron and followed up with a Styles Clash outside the ring. In the end, Styles performed a Phenomenal Forearm and a second Styles Clash on Alexander to retain the title. Following the match, Styles and his fellow O.C. members, Luke Gallows and Karl Anderson, attacked Alexander.

=== Preliminary matches ===
The actual pay-per-view began with Universal Champion Seth Rollins and Braun Strowman defending the Raw Tag Team Championship against Dolph Ziggler and Robert Roode. In the end, Strowman tackled Roode, who collided with Rollins. Ziggler then sent Strowman out of the ring, and Roode performed a Glorious DDT on Rollins to win the titles.

Next, Bayley defended the SmackDown Women's Championship against Charlotte Flair. At the start of the match, Flair performed a Big Boot on Bayley for a nearfall. In the end, Bayley exposed the bottom turnbuckle while the referee backed Flair off. Bayley threw Flair into the exposed turnbuckle and pinned her to retain the title. Immediately afterwards, Bayley grabbed her title and ran backstage.

After that, The New Day (Big E and Xavier Woods) defended the SmackDown Tag Team Championship against The Revival (Scott Dawson and Dash Wilder). In the climax, Dawson and Wilder performed Shatter Machine on Big E outside the ring before doing the same to Woods back inside. However, instead of pinning Woods, Dawson forced him to submit to an Inverted Figure Four Leglock to win the titles.

In the fourth match, Alexa Bliss and Nikki Cross defended the WWE Women's Tag Team Championship against Fire and Desire (Mandy Rose and Sonya Deville). During the match, an impromptu 24/7 Championship defense occurred when reigning champion R-Truth ran out to the ring, being chased by several wrestlers. Bliss pinned Truth with a roll up for a nearfall. Truth then rushed out of the ring. After resuming the match, Rose and Deville performed a high-low kick combo on Bliss, but Cross broke up the pin. In the closing moments, Rose attempted a Bicycle Knee, but Cross moved out of the way and performed a Swinging Neckbreaker on Rose to retain the titles.

Next, Shinsuke Nakamura (accompanied by Sami Zayn) defended the Intercontinental Championship against The Miz. In the end, as Miz performed a Skull Crushing Finale on Nakamura, Zayn distracted the referee. Miz then chased Zayn before Nakamura caught him and performed a Kinshasa to retain the title.

After that, Becky Lynch defended the Raw Women's Championship against Sasha Banks. Throughout the match, both wrestlers were able to kick out of their respective moves and escape the other's respective submissions. In the climax, Banks grabbed a chair, but the referee threw it out of the ring. As that happened, Banks retrieved another chair and struck Lynch with it before performing a Shining Wizard for a nearfall. Banks retrieved the other chair, but the referee took it from her. After Lynch obtained the chair, she was aiming for Banks, but Banks moved out of the way, causing Lynch to incapacitate the referee. A brawl between the two ensued, which spilled out into the stands and the concession area. When the brawl returned to the ring, Banks gained the upper hand. As Banks retrieved another chair, it was announced that Banks won via disqualification, thus Lynch retained the title. Lynch then struck Banks with the chair several times before using it to apply the Dis-arm-her.

Next, Kofi Kingston defended the WWE Championship against Randy Orton. During the match, Orton performed a snap powerslam on Kingston for a nearfall. Orton performed an RKO on Kingston, who placed his leg on the rope at a two count. In the end, as Orton went for the Punt Kick, Kingston dodged and executed a Trouble in Paradise to retain the title.

In the penultimate match, Roman Reigns faced Erick Rowan in a no disqualification match. Reigns performed a Superman Punch on Rowan for a nearfall. Reigns attempted another Superman Punch outside the ring, but Rowan countered and powerbombed Reigns through an announce table. While fighting in the crowd, Rowan performed an Iron Claw Slam through a table on Reigns. On the stage, Rowan attempted to hit Reigns with a jib camera, but Reigns countered and hit Rowan with the camera before executing a second Superman Punch. In the end, as Reigns charged at Rowan, a returning Luke Harper appeared and performed a big boot on Reigns before throwing him inside the ring, where he performed a discus clothesline. Rowan then performed a second Iron Claw Slam on Reigns to win.

=== Main event ===
In the main event, Seth Rollins defended the Universal Championship against Braun Strowman. Early in the match, Rollins performed three Superkicks and a Frog Splash, but Strowman kicked out before the referee began the count. Later, Strowman prevented a Superplex from Rollins and performed a Diving Splash on Rollins for a nearfall. Strowman then attempted a Running Powerslam, but Rollins countered into a sleeper hold, which Strowman escaped. Rollins then performed The Stomp on Strowman for a one count. Rollins then performed the move two more times, with both resulting in two counts. In the end, Strowman intercepted another Stomp attempt and attempted a Running Powerslam, but his knee gave out, allowing Rollins to perform a Pedigree and a fourth Stomp to retain the title. After the match, while Rollins was celebrating on the stage, the lights went out. "The Fiend" Bray Wyatt then appeared and attacked Rollins with a Sister Abigail, and choked him out with the Mandible Claw. Wyatt's laughter played throughout the arena as the event ended.

== Aftermath ==
=== Raw ===
Prior to Clash of Champions, it was rumored that Bray Wyatt would challenge for the Universal Championship at Hell in a Cell. On the following Raw, due to The Fiend's attack, Universal Champion Seth Rollins announced that he would be defending the title against Wyatt's Fiend persona at the event in a Hell in a Cell match. The following week, Rollins was interrupted by Braun Strowman, who said that it was Rollins' fault they lost the Raw Tag Team Championship. Rollins then challenged Strowman to a non-title rematch, and Strowman accepted. The match, which closed out Raw, ended in a no-contest when The Fiend attacked Strowman.

Also on the following Raw, Sasha Banks teamed with SmackDown Women's Champion Bayley to defeat WWE Women's Tag Team Champions Alexa Bliss and Nikki Cross in a non-title match. Afterwards, they were about to attack Cross with chairs, but Raw Women's Champion Becky Lynch appeared with her own chair and was initially outnumbered by Bayley and Banks until Charlotte Flair appeared and took out Bayley outside the ring. Lynch then attacked Banks with the chair, sending her retreating as well. Later that night, Banks challenged Lynch to a rematch for the Raw Women's Championship at Hell in a Cell. Lynch later accepted and subsequently changed the match stipulation to a Hell in a Cell match.

New Raw Tag Team Champions Dolph Ziggler and Robert Roode and new SmackDown Tag Team Champions The Revival (Scott Dawson and Dash Wilder) celebrated their respective championships victories, only for Braun Strowman to interrupt the celebration and attack both teams.

The O.C. (United States Champion AJ Styles, Luke Gallows, and Karl Anderson) defeated Cedric Alexander and The Viking Raiders (Erik and Ivar) in a six-man tag team match. Following the match, The O.C. attacked Alexander and The Viking Raiders, which ended when Styles performed a middle-rope Styles Clash on Alexander. The following week, during the Viking Raiders' match against Gallows and Anderson (which the former won), Styles was ejected from ringside, and was attacked by Alexander. This set up a rematch between Styles and Alexander for the U.S. title on the September 30 episode where Styles again retained.

=== SmackDown ===
On the following SmackDown, The New Day (WWE Champion Kofi Kingston, Big E, and Xavier Woods) defeated the team of Randy Orton and the new SmackDown Tag Team Champions The Revival (Scott Dawson and Dash Wilder) in a six-man tag team match. Following the match, Brock Lesnar (accompanied by Paul Heyman) returned to challenge Kingston for the WWE Championship on the debut episode of SmackDown on FOX on October 4, which Kingston accepted. Afterwards, Lesnar laid out Kingston with an F-5.

Also on SmackDown, Michael Cole conducted a sit-down interview with Erick Rowan, where Rowan declared that he had been overlooked, underappreciated, and disrespected and attacked Roman Reigns to scare him and to show that Reigns was not the dominant figure he was presumed to be. He also stated that he was not Daniel Bryan's equal, but better than him. Later that night, Bryan cut a promo, stating that regardless if he was a face or a heel, he had never lied and thought of Rowan as his friend and his equal. Bryan was interrupted by Rowan and attacked from behind by Luke Harper. Reigns came out to Bryan's aid, only for Rowan and Harper to dominate Bryan and Reigns. The following week, Rowan defeated Bryan, and afterwards, Harper and Rowan attacked Bryan. Reigns again came to Bryan's aid, and this time, they eventually overcame Rowan and Harper. Reigns and Bryan then challenged Rowan and Harper to a tag team match at Hell in a Cell, which was made official. Just prior to Hell in a Cell, Rowan and Reigns had a rematch on SmackDown's 20th Anniversary on October 4 in a lumberjack match that Reigns won. The tag team match was later stipulated as a tornado tag team match.

Sami Zayn and Intercontinental Champion Shinsuke Nakamura demanded respect from the crowd for Nakamura defeating The Miz and then attacked Ali, who had defeated Nakamura in a match a few weeks prior. The following week, Nakamura defeated Ali in a non-title match after interference from Zayn.

Sasha Banks faced Charlotte Flair, only for the match to end in a disqualification win for Flair after interference from SmackDown Women's Champion Bayley. Bayley and Banks proceeded to beat down Flair until Carmella made the save. A tag team match took place the following week where Bayley and Banks defeated Flair and Carmella. After the match, while Carmella ran away from the Raw and SmackDown roster (she won the 24/7 championship the previous night on Raw), Bayley and Banks attacked Flair until Raw Women's Champion Becky Lynch attacked them, sending them retreating. This led to a tag team match pitting Bayley and Banks against Lynch and Flair on the debut episode of SmackDown on FOX, where Lynch and Flair won after Flair submitted Bayley. Later that night, a rematch between Bayley and Flair for the SmackDown Women's Championship was scheduled for Hell in a Cell.

=== 205 Live ===
This would be the only Clash of Champions and subsequently WWE's final main roster PPV and livestreaming event to feature the 205 Live brand. The brand was merged under NXT on October, 2, 2019, with the WWE Cruiserweight Championship renamed as the NXT Cruiserweight Championship.

== Results ==
No.	Results	Stipulations	Times
1^{P}	Drew Gulak (c) defeated Humberto Carrillo and Lince Dorado by pinfall	Triple threat match for the WWE Cruiserweight Championship	10:05
2^{P}	AJ Styles (c) defeated Cedric Alexander by pinfall	Singles match for the WWE United States Championship	4:55
3	Robert Roode and Dolph Ziggler defeated Seth Rollins and Braun Strowman (c) by pinfall	Tag team match for the WWE Raw Tag Team Championship	9:40
4	Bayley (c) defeated Charlotte Flair by pinfall	Singles match for the WWE SmackDown Women's Championship	3:45
5	The Revival (Dash Wilder and Scott Dawson) defeated The New Day (Big E and Xavier Woods) (c) by submission	Tag team match for the WWE SmackDown Tag Team Championship	10:15
6	Alexa Bliss and Nikki Cross (c) defeated Fire and Desire (Mandy Rose and Sonya Deville) by pinfall	Tag team match for the WWE Women's Tag Team Championship	10:35
7	Shinsuke Nakamura (c) (with Sami Zayn) defeated The Miz by pinfall	Singles match for the WWE Intercontinental Championship	9:35
8	Sasha Banks defeated Becky Lynch (c) by disqualification	Singles match for the WWE Raw Women's Championship	20:00
9	Kofi Kingston (c) defeated Randy Orton by pinfall	Singles match for the WWE Championship	20:50
10	Erick Rowan defeated Roman Reigns by pinfall	No Disqualification match	17:25
11	Seth Rollins (c) defeated Braun Strowman by pinfall	Singles match for the WWE Universal Championship	11:00
(c) / – the champion(s) heading into the match; P / – the match was broadcast on the pre-show
