= Survivor Series (2017) =

WWE pay-per-view and livestreaming event

- Promotional poster featuring Brock Lesnar, AJ Styles, and various WWE wrestlers
- Promotion: WWE
- Brand(s): Raw; SmackDown
- Date: November 19, 2017
- City: Houston, Texas
- Venue: Toyota Center
- Attendance: 14,448

WWE event chronology
| ← Previous; NXT TakeOver: WarGames | Next → Clash of Champions |

Survivor Series chronology
| ← Previous; 2016 | Next → 2018 |

The 2017 Survivor Series was a professional wrestling pay-per-view (PPV) and livestreaming event produced by WWE, held for wrestlers from the promotion's main roster brands, Raw and SmackDown. It was the 31st annual Survivor Series and took place on November 19, 2017, at the Toyota Center in Houston, Texas. After the 2016 event had several interpromotional matches between the two brands, the theme of the 2017 event became brand supremacy in which every match on the main card involved wrestlers from the two brands in direct competition, including the titular Survivor Series match, a tag team elimination match that pits teams of multiple wrestlers against each other.

Ten matches were contested at the event, including three on the Kickoff pre-show. Two Survivor Series matches were held, one each for the men and women. The main event was the men's Survivor Series match in which Team Raw defeated Team SmackDown, and as a result, Kurt Angle kept his position as Raw General Manager, while the undercard featured the women's iteration where Team Raw was also victorious. The champions of each brand also faced their counterparts in non-title matches; except for SmackDown's WWE Champion AJ Styles, who lost to Raw's Universal Champion Brock Lesnar, all SmackDown champions were victorious. Also on the main card, Raw's The Shield (Roman Reigns, Seth Rollins, and Dean Ambrose) defeated SmackDown's The New Day (Big E, Kofi Kingston, and Xavier Woods), which was also The Shield's first match together since Payback in June 2014. Raw won brand supremacy by winning four of the seven matches on the main card. On the pre-show, which consisted of non-interbrand matches, Enzo Amore defeated Kalisto to retain Raw's WWE Cruiserweight Championship in what was the only title match of the night.

== Production ==
=== Background ===
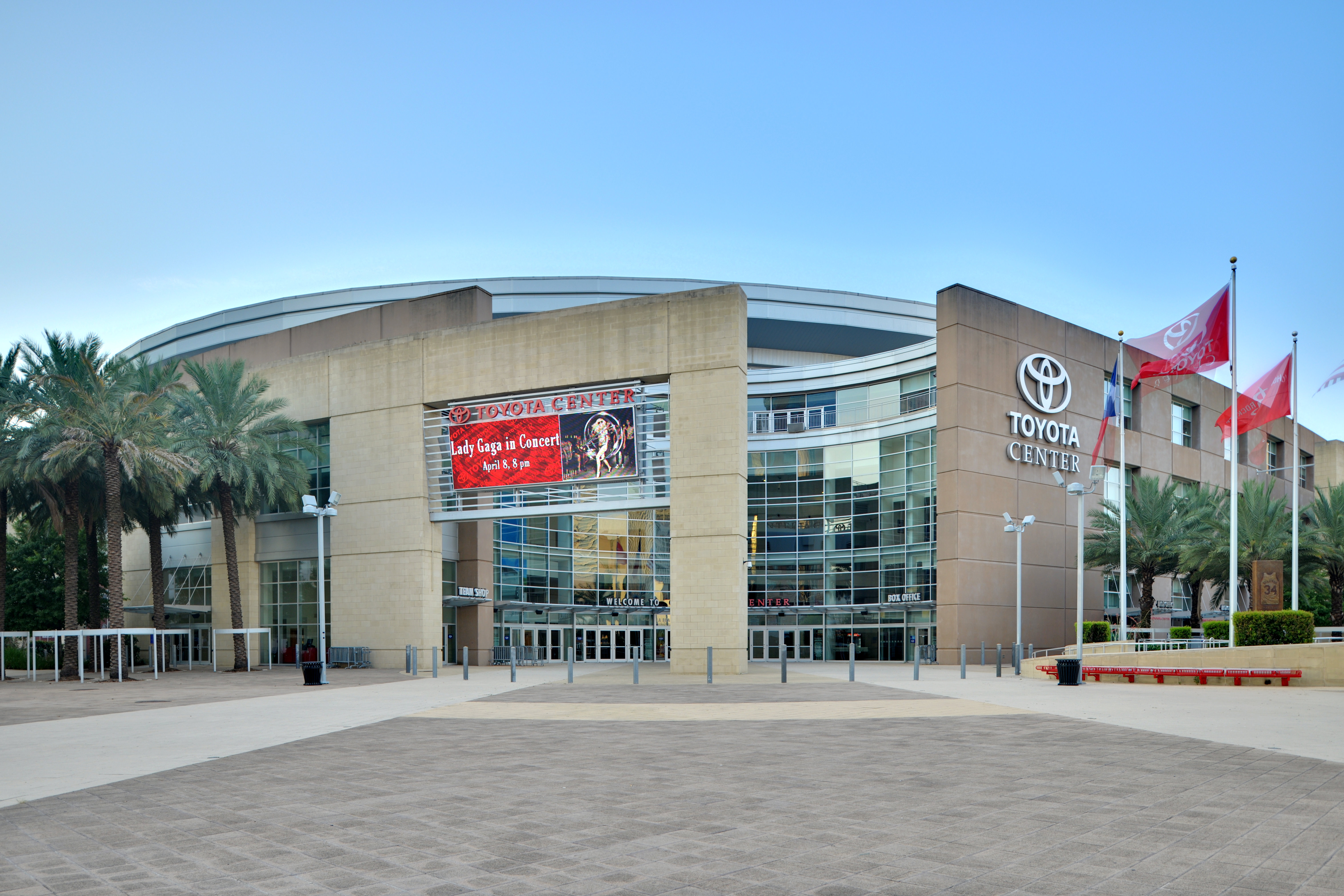
The 31st annual Survivor Series event was held at the Toyota Center in Houston, Texas.

Survivor Series is an annual professional wrestling event, produced every November by WWE since 1987, generally held around Thanksgiving in the United States. It was originally broadcast exclusively via pay-per-view (PPV) before it began simultaneously livestreaming on the WWE Network in 2014. In what has become the second longest-running PPV event in history (behind WWE's WrestleMania), it is one of the promotion's original four PPVs, along with WrestleMania, SummerSlam, and Royal Rumble, referred to as the "Big Four". The event is traditionally characterized by having Survivor Series matches, which are tag team elimination matches that typically pits teams of four or five wrestlers against each other. Announced on November 17, 2016, the 31st Survivor Series event was scheduled to be held on November 19, 2017, at the Toyota Center in Houston, Texas. Travel packages became available on December 6, 2016, while individual tickets went on sale on December 9.

In July 2016, WWE reintroduced the brand extension, again splitting the main roster between the Raw and SmackDown brands where wrestlers were exclusively assigned to perform. Subsequently, the 2016 Survivor Series featured several interpromotional matches to determine which was the better brand, similar to the previous Bragging Rights event. This would be the genesis for what became the brand supremacy theme of the 2017 event, in which every match on the main card was an interpromotional match. This included two Survivor Series matches, one each for the men and women, as well as every champion from Raw facing their SmackDown counterpart in non-title matches: Raw's Universal Champion against SmackDown's WWE Champion, the Raw Women's Champion against the SmackDown Women's Champion, Raw's Intercontinental Champion against SmackDown's United States Champion, and the Raw Tag Team Champions against the SmackDown Tag Team Champions. As Raw's WWE Cruiserweight Championship was the only title of its kind in WWE, it was the only title to be defended, which occurred on the Kickoff pre-show.

=== Storylines ===
The event comprised 10 matches, including three on the Kickoff pre-show, that resulted from scripted storylines. Results were predetermined by WWE's writers on the Raw and SmackDown brands, while storylines were produced on WWE's weekly television shows, Monday Night Raw, SmackDown Live, and the cruiserweight-exclusive 205 Live.

At Raw's No Mercy event, Brock Lesnar defeated Braun Strowman to retain the Universal Championship, while at SmackDown's Hell in a Cell event, Jinder Mahal retained the WWE Championship against Shinsuke Nakamura. On the October 17 episode of SmackDown, Mahal said that he had defeated every worthy opponent on the SmackDown roster and that at Survivor Series, he wanted to face Raw's top champion, Brock Lesnar; this challenge was made prior to the official announcement that all of Raw's champions would face their SmackDown counterparts. AJ Styles took exception to Mahal's claim and challenged Mahal for the WWE Championship. Mahal said that Styles was a joke, and Styles attacked Mahal and The Singh Brothers (Samir Singh and Sunil Singh). Backstage, Mahal confronted SmackDown General Manager Daniel Bryan about the incident, and said that one of The Singh Brothers should make Styles pay and Bryan agreed; Styles defeated both Sunil and Samir, respectively, on the following two episodes. On the October 23 episode of Raw, Lesnar and his advocate Paul Heyman laughed at Mahal's challenge but accepted nevertheless. On the November 7 episode of SmackDown, Styles defeated Mahal to win the WWE Championship, thus replacing Mahal as Lesnar's opponent at Survivor Series. Lesnar and Heyman appeared on Raw the following week to address Lesnar's new opponent, stating that Styles was the ultimate underdog, but that Lesnar was the number one champion in WWE history. The following night on SmackDown, Styles and Bryan mocked Lesnar and Heyman, and said that Styles would overcome Lesnar.

Intercontinental Champion The Miz kept his spot in the Survivor Series match by retaining his title against Matt Hardy on the October 30 episode of Raw. Baron Corbin also kept his spot by retaining the United States Championship against Sin Cara on the November 14 episode of SmackDown. Also on the October 30 episode of Raw, Alexa Bliss retained the Raw Women's Championship against Mickie James, keeping her in the Survivor Series match against the SmackDown Women's Champion; her opponent was originally Natalya, but was changed to Charlotte Flair, who defeated Natalya for the title on the November 14 episode of SmackDown. On the November 6 episode of Raw, Cesaro and Sheamus defeated Dean Ambrose and Seth Rollins to become the Raw Tag Team Champions, thus making them the champions for the Survivor Series match against The Usos (Jey Uso and Jimmy Uso) who, despite losing by count-out, retained their SmackDown Tag Team Championship against Chad Gable and Shelton Benjamin on the November 7 episode of SmackDown.

As Raw General Manager Kurt Angle was about to reveal the men's Survivor Series team for Team Raw on the October 23 episode of Raw, SmackDown Commissioner Shane McMahon with several SmackDown wrestlers came through the crowd. They proceeded to the backstage area and attacked the wrestlers of Raw. The following night on SmackDown, SmackDown General Manager Daniel Bryan was surprised that Angle and members of the Raw brand did not invade SmackDown, but warned Shane that they would eventually show up for retribution. That same episode, Team SmackDown got its first member when Randy Orton qualified by defeating Sami Zayn. The following week, Shane made himself the captain of Team SmackDown and explained their invasion of Raw, stating that SmackDown had always been looked at as the inferior brand. He also said that Raw would pay for injuring Bryan, who Kane had attacked with a chokeslam the previous night on Raw. Later that episode, Bobby Roode and Shinsuke Nakamura qualified for the team by defeating Dolph Ziggler and Kevin Owens, respectively. The last spot for Team SmackDown was originally going to be determined the following week in a match between AJ Styles and Rusev, but that match was canceled after Styles was scheduled to face Jinder Mahal for the WWE Championship that episode. Rusev instead faced Orton to qualify, but failed to defeat him. The following day on Twitter, Shane named John Cena, a non-exclusive wrestler who could appear on both Raw and SmackDown, the final member of Team SmackDown.

Raw Commissioner Stephanie McMahon made her return on the October 30 episode of Raw and confronted Kurt Angle; her last appearance as Raw's Commissioner was at WrestleMania 33. She said that SmackDown's invasion was an embarrassment to Angle and the entire Raw locker room. She then gave Angle the opportunity to redeem himself by naming Angle the captain of Team Raw. However, she said that if Team Raw were to lose at Survivor Series, Angle would be fired as the Raw General Manager. Afterwards on Twitter, Angle named Braun Strowman as his first pick for Team Raw. The following week, after their match ended in a double count-out, Samoa Joe and Finn Bálor were both added to Team Raw by Angle. Later that episode, Angle named Jason Jordan as the final member of Team Raw. The very next week, however, Stephanie disagreed with Angle's final pick and said that she wanted to decimate SmackDown. Later in the show, Jordan was (storyline) injured by a returning Bray Wyatt, and rendered unable to compete by Angle. Jordan begged Angle to not remove him from the Survivor Series match. Angle could not bring himself to do it, after which, Chief Operating Officer Triple H returned (his first appearance on Raw since WrestleMania 33), attacked Jordan with a Pedigree, and declared himself Jordan's replacement. The following night on SmackDown, during a tag team match between The New Day and Owens and Zayn, Raw invaded SmackDown by attacking the roster. After everyone was taken out, Shane McMahon was attacked, suffering an Angle Slam by Angle and two Triple Powerbombs by The Shield.

The women's Survivor Series team for Team Raw began to take shape also on the October 23 episode of Raw. A triple threat match between Alicia Fox, Bayley, and Sasha Banks was scheduled to determine the captain for Team Raw, which was won by Fox. The following week, Fox was originally scheduled to face Bayley, but as Team Raw's captain, she instead had Nia Jax face Bayley, which Jax won. After the match, Fox chose Jax as her first pick for Team Raw. Fox then added Asuka to the team after the latter defeated enhancement talent Stacy Coates. Later, she added Banks to the team after Banks and Bayley defeated Fox and Jax in a tag team match. Bayley won the final spot on Team Raw by defeating Dana Brooke and Mickie James in a triple threat match on the November 13 episode of Raw. On the October 24 episode of SmackDown, Becky Lynch, Carmella, Charlotte Flair, Naomi, and Tamina were named as the five members of Team SmackDown; Becky Lynch became captain by defeating the other four in a fatal five-way match. The following week, Becky said that Team SmackDown needed to be ready if Raw were to invade them. Then-SmackDown Women's Champion Natalya interrupted and said it was unfortunate that she was not the captain, but would defeat Raw Women's Champion Alexa Bliss. She also said that Lynch needed to find who the weak link was on their team. Flair was then removed from the team after winning the SmackDown Women's Championship, and she was replaced by former champion Natalya.

On the November 6 episode of Raw, during Dean Ambrose and Seth Rollins' Raw Tag Team Championship defense against Cesaro and Sheamus, SmackDown's The New Day (Big E, Kofi Kingston, and Xavier Woods) appeared in the crowd to make Raw believe that SmackDown were invading them again. General Manager Kurt Angle signaled for the Raw locker to go after The New Day. During the distraction, Sheamus pinned Rollins to win the Raw Tag Team Championship for him and Cesaro. Roman Reigns, who had been out with an illness, returned the following week and The Shield challenged The New Day to a six-man tag team match at Survivor Series, which was made official. The following night on SmackDown, The Shield invaded SmackDown during New Day's tag team match against Kevin Owens and Sami Zayn. Owens and Zayn bailed while The Shield attacked The New Day.

At Raw's TLC: Tables, Ladders & Chairs event, Enzo Amore defeated Kalisto to recapture the WWE Cruiserweight Championship. Kalisto invoked his championship rematch on the following episode of 205 Live, but Amore retained after he was disqualified for attacking the referee. Kalisto then attacked Amore out of anger. The following week on Raw, Kalisto defeated Drew Gulak, who had Amore in his corner. After the match, Amore attacked Kalisto with the JawdonZo. Another rematch between the two for the Cruiserweight Championship was scheduled for the Survivor Series Kickoff pre-show.

On November 19, just prior to the event, WWE scheduled two non-interpromotional matches for the Survivor Series Kickoff pre-show: a singles match from Raw pitting Elias against Matt Hardy, and a tag team match from SmackDown pitting Kevin Owens and Sami Zayn against Breezango (Fandango and Tyler Breeze).

== Event ==
Other on-screen personnel
| Role: | Name: |
|---|---|
| English commentators | Michael Cole (Raw) |
| English commentators | Corey Graves (Raw/SmackDown) |
| English commentators | Booker T (Raw) |
| English commentators | Tom Phillips (SmackDown) |
| English commentators | Byron Saxton (SmackDown) |
| English commentators | Vic Joseph (Cruiserweight title match) |
| English commentators | Nigel McGuinness (Cruiserweight title match) |
| Spanish commentators | Carlos Cabrera |
| Spanish commentators | Marcelo Rodríguez |
| German commentators | Carsten Schaefer |
| German commentators | Tim Haber |
| German commentators | Calvin Knie |
| Ring announcers | Greg Hamilton |
| Ring announcers | JoJo |
| Referees | Jason Ayers |
| Referees | Shawn Bennett |
| Referees | Mike Chioda |
| Referees | John Cone |
| Referees | Dan Engler |
| Referees | Darrick Moore |
| Referees | Charles Robinson |
| Referees | Ryan Tran |
| Referees | Rod Zapata |
| Interviewers | Renee Young |
| Interviewers | Charly Caruso |
| Interviewers | Dasha Fuentes |
| Pre-show panel | Renee Young |
| Pre-show panel | Jerry Lawler |
| Pre-show panel | Peter Rosenberg |
| Pre-show panel | Shawn Michaels |

=== Pre-show ===
Three matches were contested on the Survivor Series Kickoff pre-show. In the first match, Elias faced Matt Hardy. In the end, Elias threw Hardy into the ring post and performed a "Drift Away" on Hardy to win the match.

Next, Enzo Amore defended the WWE Cruiserweight Championship against Kalisto. In the climax, Kalisto hit an exposed turnbuckle, which allowed Amore to perform the "JawdonZo" on Kalisto to retain the title.

In the last pre-show match, Kevin Owens and Sami Zayn faced Breezango (Fandango and Tyler Breeze). Owens performed a pop-up powerbomb on Fandango to win the match.

=== Preliminary matches ===
The actual pay-per-view opened with The Shield facing The New Day. During the match, Woods performed a Double "Midnight Hour" on Rollins and Ambrose, who were on top of Big E's shoulders. Reigns performed a spear on Kingston. Ambrose countered a clothesline attempt by Big E with a "Dirty Deeds". In the end, Ambrose, Reigns, and Rollins performed the triple powerbomb from the second rope on Kingston followed by Ambrose pinning Kingston to win the match, opening the event with 1-0 for Raw.

Next, Team Raw (Alicia Fox, Sasha Banks, Bayley, Asuka, and Nia Jax) faced Team SmackDown (Becky Lynch, Naomi, Carmella, Natalya, and Tamina) in a 5-on-5 elimination match. The team captains, Fox and Lynch, started the match. Bayley tagged in and eliminated Lynch with a roll-up. Carmella performed a superkick on Bayley followed by a "Samoan Splash" by Tamina to eliminate Bayley. Tamina attacked Jax with a crossbody and performed a "Samoan Splash" off the steel steps on Jax: Jax was unable to answer the referee's ten count and was eliminated. Naomi reversed a "Tilt-a-Whirl Backbraker" from Fox into a Sitout Pin, to eliminate Fox. Banks applied the "Bank Statement" on Naomi to eliminate her. Asuka performed a roundhousekick on Carmella to eliminate her. Natalya applied the "Sharpshooter" on Banks to eliminate her. Asuka applied an armbar on Tamina to eliminate her and then applied the "Asuka Lock" on Natalya to eliminate her to win the match, leaving Asuka as the sole survivor of Team Raw and still undefeated in her WWE career and moving the score up to 2-0 for Raw.

Next, Intercontinental Champion The Miz faced United States Champion Baron Corbin. In the end, Corbin countered a roundhouse kick by Miz and performed the "End of Days" on The Miz to win the match. SmackDown gained its first point, making the score 2-1.

After that, Raw Tag Team Champions Cesaro and Sheamus faced SmackDown Tag Team Champions The Usos. In the end, Jey performed the "Samoan Splash" on Sheamus to win the match, tying the score at 2-2.

In the fourth match, Raw Women's Champion Alexa Bliss faced SmackDown Women's Champion Charlotte Flair. In the end, Flair applied the "Figure Eight" on Bliss and Bliss tapped out, with SmackDown taking the lead of 3-2.

After that, Universal Champion Brock Lesnar faced WWE Champion AJ Styles. In the end, Styles applied the "Calf Crusher" on Lesnar only for Lesnar to slam Styles' head into the mat to release the hold. Styles performed a Pele Kick and a "Phenomenal Forearm" on Lesnar for a nearfall. As Styles attempted another "Phenomenal Forearm", Lesnar caught him in midair and executed the "F-5" on Styles to win the match, tying the score at 3-3.

=== Main event ===
In the main event, Team Raw (Kurt Angle, Braun Strowman, Finn Bálor, Samoa Joe, and Triple H) battled Team SmackDown (Shane McMahon, Randy Orton, Bobby Roode, Shinsuke Nakamura, and John Cena) in a 5-on-5 elimination match, with the stipulation being that if Team Raw were to lose, Angle would be fired as Raw General Manager. Strowman pinned both Nakamura and Roode after running powerslams. Joe and Bálor began to argue which allowed Cena to perform "Attitude Adjustments" on both, eliminating Joe by pinfall. Angle performed an "Angle Slam" on Cena only for Shane to break the cover. Cena was eliminated following a "Coup de Gráce" from Bálor and another "Angle Slam" from Angle. Orton countered a "Coup de Gráce" from Bálor and performed an "RKO" on Bálor for a pinfall. Shane was then attacked by Kevin Owens and Sami Zayn but managed to fight them off with a chair. Strowman pinned Orton after a running powerslam, leaving Shane as the last member of Team SmackDown. In the end, as Angle had Shane in the "Ankle Lock", Triple H turned on Angle, performed a "Pedigree" on Angle, and placed Shane on top of Angle to eliminate him. Triple H then performed a Pedigree on Shane and pinned him to win the match for Team Raw. After the match, a confused Strowman grabbed Triple H by the throat and warned him to never try something like that again. As Triple H attempted to attack Strowman from behind, Strowman retaliated with two running powerslams. As a result of the final match, Angle kept his position as Raw General Manager and Raw won brand supremacy 4-3.

== Aftermath ==
=== Raw ===
The following night's Raw opened with Raw Commissioner Stephanie McMahon gloating about Raw defeating SmackDown at Survivor Series. She said that Kurt Angle's job as the Raw General Manager was secure, and then introduced "the man responsible for [Raw's] victory", her husband and COO Triple H. Before Triple H could speak, Angle interrupted and said that if Triple H were to ever attack him from behind again, he did not care about his job and would be coming for Triple H. Jason Jordan then came out and challenged Triple H to a match. Angle had him back down. Jordan said that Triple H was afraid and Stephanie retorted that Triple H was afraid of no one. Braun Strowman came out and confronted Triple H, who retreated. Stephanie then scheduled Jordan to face Strowman. The match ended in a no contest after Kane attacked Strowman. Kane and Strowman continued to feud over the next month, and it was decided that Brock Lesnar would defend the Universal Championship against Kane and Strowman in a triple threat match at the Royal Rumble, which Lesnar won to retain his title.

The Miz addressed his loss to United States Champion Baron Corbin and said that Corbin had the biggest victory of his career, but Miz was on the A-show. He then introduced his guest for Miz TV, Roman Reigns, who was accompanied by both Dean Ambrose and Seth Rollins. Miz said his segment was with Reigns, not the entire Shield. The Shield said that at Survivor Series, they proved that they were the most dominant three-man team in WWE history. Miz said that he deserved a "thank you" as it was because of him that The Shield reunited. Miz then gloated that he was a champion, holding up his Intercontinental Championship. Ambrose and Rollins said they would eventually recapture the Raw Tag Team Championship from Cesaro and Sheamus, and Reigns challenged The Miz for the Intercontinental Championship. In the main event, Reigns defeated Miz for the title, also becoming a Triple Crown Champion and a Grand Slam Champion in the process. The Miz regained the title in a rematch on the Raw 25th Anniversary episode on January 22, 2018; he also announced his participation in the 2018 Royal Rumble match just prior to that episode of Raw.

Samoa Joe and Finn Bálor tried to settle their Survivor Series differences in a match, which Joe won when Bálor passed out to the Coquina Clutch. Elias came out to play a song and bragged about defeating Matt Hardy, who then attacked Elias. Bálor also formed the Bálor Club with Luke Gallows and Karl Anderson (all three being former members of New Japan Pro-Wrestling's Bullet Club of which Bálor was the original leader), and Matt became "Woken" Matt Hardy (WWE's version of "Broken" Matt Hardy from TNA) and started a feud with Bray Wyatt.

In the women's division, Raw's sole survivor Asuka had a match with Dana Brooke, who blamed Asuka for her not being on Team Raw at Survivor Series. Asuka subsequently defeated Brooke. Raw Women's Champion Alexa Bliss talked about her match against SmackDown Women's Champion Charlotte Flair, stating that she only had five days to prepare, but said she took Charlotte to her limits. She was then interrupted by Mickie James, Bayley, Sasha Banks, and Alicia Fox, who each wanted a shot at the Raw Women's Championship. A fatal four-way match between them to determine the number one contender ended in a no contest after being attacked by the returning Paige and the debuts of NXT's Mandy Rose and Sonya Deville, who would later be known as Absolution. On the December 18 episode of Raw, the first women's Royal Rumble match, involving wrestlers from both Raw and SmackDown, was scheduled for the 2018 Royal Rumble.

=== SmackDown ===
On the following episode of SmackDown, SmackDown Commissioner Shane McMahon addressed Survivor Series. He stated that despite their loss, SmackDown would no longer be considered the B-show. He then called out Kevin Owens and Sami Zayn and was about to fire them for the attack at Survivor Series, when General Manager Daniel Bryan instead decided to have Owens and Zayn face The New Day, who they had bailed on the previous week, in a lumberjack match. When a brawl broke out ringside, Zayn and Owens capitalized on the distraction and defeated The New Day. Backstage, Owens begged for Bryan not to fire them and Bryan said he would not. Owens and Zayn were subsequently scheduled to fight for their jobs against Randy Orton and Shinsuke Nakamura in a tag team match at Clash of Champions, with Shane and Bryan as guest referees. Owens and Zayn won, keeping their jobs, and continued to feud with Shane McMahon.

WWE Champion AJ Styles congratulated Brock Lesnar for his victory and accepted Jinder Mahal's challenge, who invoked his championship rematch for Clash of Champions. Styles was then attacked by The Singh Brothers, but fought them off. Styles defeated them in a handicap match the following week and went on to win at Clash of Champions.

In the women's division, Natalya invoked her championship rematch against Charlotte Flair for the SmackDown Women's Championship. Their match ended in a no contest after they were attacked by NXT's Ruby Riott, Liv Morgan, and Sarah Logan, who made their main roster debut as The Riott Squad. The trio had also attacked Naomi and Becky Lynch backstage earlier in the night. At Clash of Champions, Charlotte defeated Natalya in a lumberjack match to retain her title.

== Results ==
| No. | Results | Stipulations | Times |
|---|---|---|---|
| 1^{P} | Elias defeated Matt Hardy by pinfall | Singles match | 9:15 |
| 2^{P} | Enzo Amore (c) defeated Kalisto by pinfall | Singles match for the WWE Cruiserweight Championship | 8:45 |
| 3^{P} | Kevin Owens and Sami Zayn defeated Breezango (Fandango and Tyler Breeze) by pinfall | Tag team match | 7:45 |
| 4 | The Shield (Dean Ambrose, Roman Reigns, and Seth Rollins) (Raw) defeated The New Day (Big E, Kofi Kingston, and Xavier Woods) (SmackDown) by pinfall | Six-man tag team match | 21:20 |
| 5 | Team Raw (Alicia Fox, Sasha Banks, Bayley, Asuka, and Nia Jax) defeated Team SmackDown (Becky Lynch, Naomi, Carmella, Natalya, and Tamina) (with Lana)^{1} | 5-on-5 Survivor Series match | 18:35 |
| 6 | Baron Corbin (SmackDown's United States Champion) defeated The Miz (Raw's Intercontinental Champion) (with Bo Dallas and Curtis Axel) by pinfall | Champion vs. Champion singles match | 9:35 |
| 7 | The Usos (Jey Uso and Jimmy Uso) (SmackDown Tag Team Champions) defeated Cesaro and Sheamus (Raw Tag Team Champions) by pinfall | Champions vs. Champions tag team match | 15:55 |
| 8 | Charlotte Flair (SmackDown Women's Champion) defeated Alexa Bliss (Raw Women's Champion) by submission | Champion vs. Champion singles match | 15:00 |
| 9 | Brock Lesnar (Raw's Universal Champion) (with Paul Heyman) defeated AJ Styles (SmackDown's WWE Champion) by pinfall | Champion vs. Champion singles match | 15:25 |
| 10 | Team Raw (Kurt Angle, Braun Strowman, Finn Bálor, Samoa Joe, and Triple H) defeated Team SmackDown (Shane McMahon, Randy Orton, Bobby Roode, Shinsuke Nakamura, and John Cena)^{2} | 5-on-5 Survivor Series match Had Team Raw lost, Kurt Angle would have been fired as Raw General Manager. | 33:20 |
(c) / – the champion(s) heading into the match; P / – the match was broadcast on the pre-show

=== Survivor Series matches ===
^1

| Eliminated | Wrestler | Eliminated by | Method | Time |
|---|---|---|---|---|
| 1 | Becky Lynch | Bayley | Pinfall | 2:05 |
| 2 | Bayley | Tamina | Pinfall | 5:30 |
| 3 | Nia Jax | N/A | Countout | 9:05 |
| 4 | Alicia Fox | Naomi | Pinfall | 11:00 |
| 5 | Naomi | Sasha Banks | Submission | 11:08 |
| 6 | Carmella | Asuka | Pinfall | 13:00 |
| 7 | Sasha Banks | Natalya | Submission | 15:30 |
| 8 | Tamina | Asuka | Submission | 17:35 |
| 9 | Natalya | Asuka | Submission | 18:35 |
| Sole Survivor: | Asuka (Team Raw) | | | 18:35 |

^2

| Eliminated | Wrestler | Eliminated by | Method | Time |
|---|---|---|---|---|
| 1 | Shinsuke Nakamura | Braun Strowman | Running Powerslam | 11:30 |
| 2 | Bobby Roode | Braun Strowman | Running Powerslam | 12:40 |
| 3 | Samoa Joe | John Cena | Attitude Adjustment | 18:10 |
| 4 | John Cena | Kurt Angle | Angle Slam | 21:55 |
| 5 | Finn Bálor | Randy Orton | RKO | 23:35 |
| 6 | Randy Orton | Braun Strowman | Running Powerslam | 26:37 |
| 7 | Kurt Angle | Shane McMahon | Pedigree | 32:00 |
| 8 | Shane McMahon | Triple H | Pedigree | 33:20 |
| Survivor(s): | Braun Strowman and Triple H (Team Raw) | | | 33:20 |
