= Clash of Champions (2020) =

WWE pay-per-view and livestreaming event

- Promotional poster featuring Drew McIntyre, Bayley, Asuka, and Roman Reigns
- Promotion: WWE
- Brand(s): Raw; SmackDown
- Date: September 27, 2020
- City: Orlando, Florida (Note: The event was originally scheduled to be held at the Prudential Center in Newark, New Jersey.)
- Venue: WWE ThunderDome at Amway Center
- Attendance: 0 (behind closed doors) (Note: The event was held without a paying audience due to the COVID-19 pandemic in the United States, though it featured a live crowd of virtual fans via WWE's ThunderDome viewing experience.)
- Tagline: Gold Rush

WWE event chronology
| ← Previous; Payback | Next → NXT TakeOver 31 |

Clash of Champions chronology
| ← Previous; 2019 | Next → Final |

The 2020 Clash of Champions, also promoted as Clash of Champions: Gold Rush, was a professional wrestling pay-per-view (PPV) and livestreaming event produced by WWE, held for wrestlers from the promotion's main roster brands, Raw and SmackDown. It was the fourth and final Clash of Champions and took place on September 27, 2020, from the WWE ThunderDome, a bio-secure bubble that at the time was hosted at the Amway Center in Orlando, Florida. The theme of the event was that all of WWE's active main roster championships at the time were defended, with the exception of the WWE Women's Tag Team Championship as an originally scheduled match for the title was canceled as the champions were not medically cleared to compete.

The event was originally scheduled to be held on September 20, 2020, at the Prudential Center in Newark, New Jersey, but Governor Phil Murphy canceled all large public gatherings of more than 50 people due to the COVID-19 pandemic. With WWE's ThunderDome residency at the Amway Center that began in late August, Clash of Champions was subsequently relocated to this venue and pushed back to September 27. An event was planned for 2021, but its September date was instead given to Extreme Rules.

Eight matches were contested at the event, including one on the Kickoff pre-show. In the main event, Roman Reigns defeated Jey Uso by technical knockout to retain SmackDown's Universal Championship. In the penultimate match, Drew McIntyre defeated Randy Orton in an ambulance match to retain Raw's WWE Championship. In other prominent matches, Bobby Lashley defeated Apollo Crews to retain Raw's United States Championship, and in the opening bout, Sami Zayn defeated AJ Styles and defending champion Jeff Hardy in a triple threat ladder match to become SmackDown's undisputed Intercontinental Champion.

The event received positive reviews from critics, praising both the triple threat Intercontinental Championship ladder match and the Universal Championship main event.

== Production ==
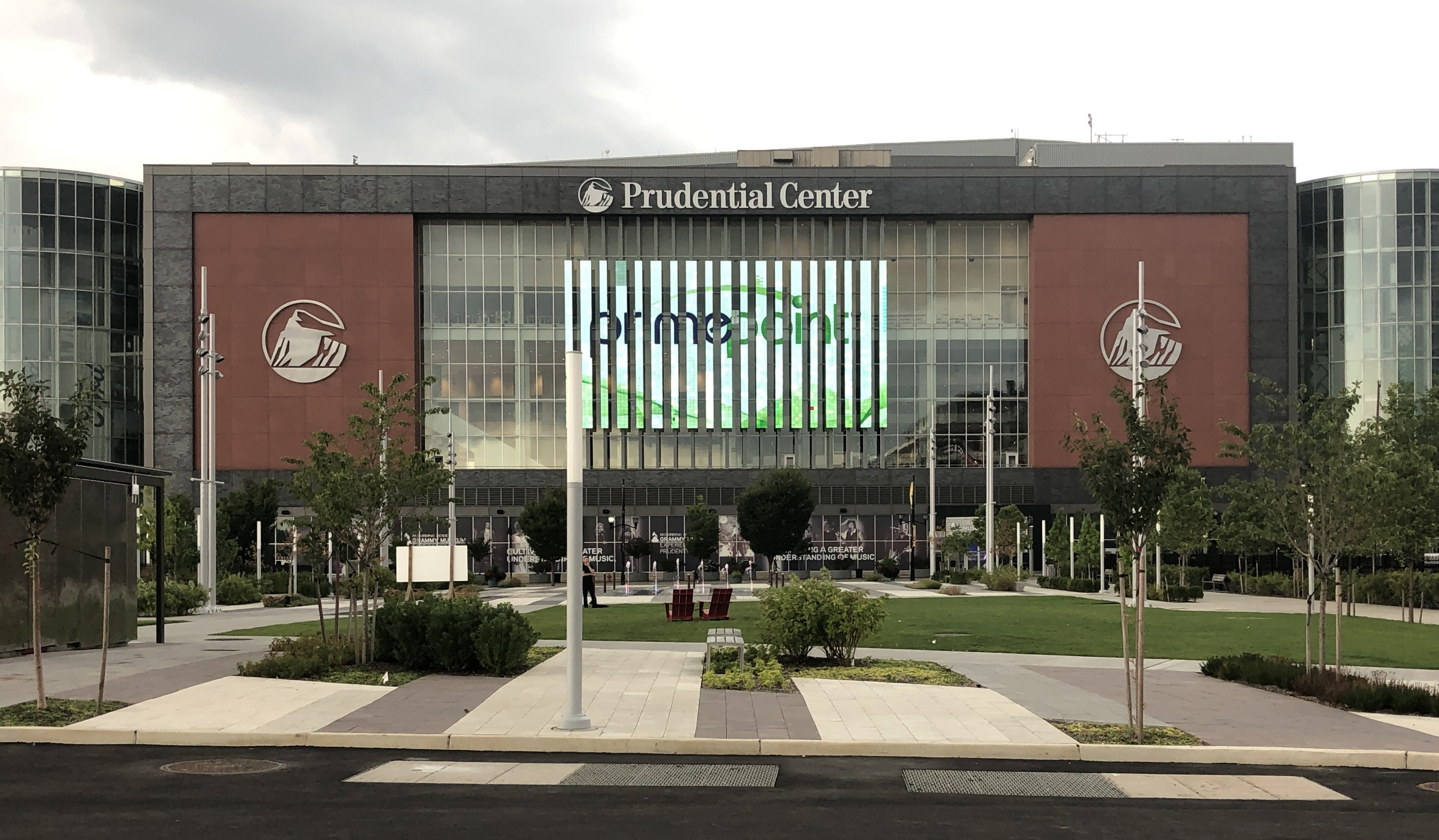
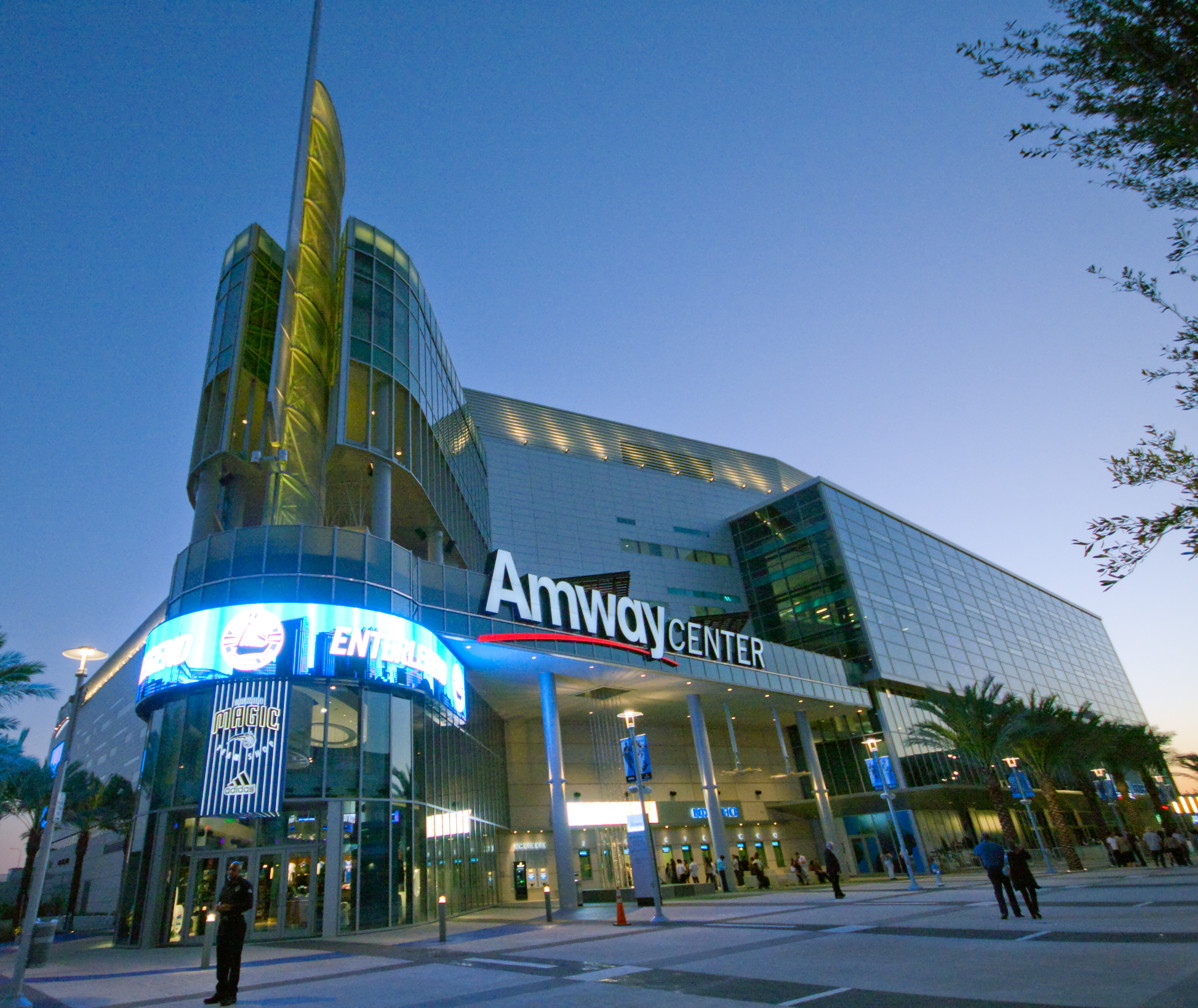
The fourth Clash of Champions was originally planned to be held at the Prudential Center in Newark, New Jersey, but due to the COVID-19 pandemic, it was produced by way of a bio-secure bubble called the WWE ThunderDome, which at the time was hosted at the Amway Center in Orlando, Florida.

=== Background ===
Clash of Champions was a professional wrestling pay-per-view (PPV) and livestreaming event first produced by WWE in 2016, and was held every year except in 2018. The theme of the event was that all active championships available to each brand division featured at the event were defended. The fourth Clash of Champions featured the Raw and SmackDown brands and their respective titles at the time. These included the four championships on Raw—the WWE Championship, the Raw Women's Championship, the United States Championship, and the Raw Tag Team Championship—the four championships on SmackDown—the Universal Championship, the SmackDown Women's Championship, the Intercontinental Championship, and the SmackDown Tag Team Championship—and the non-exclusive 24/7 Championship. The event aired on PPV worldwide and was available to livestream on the WWE Network.

Only one of WWE's 10 active main roster championships at the time was not defended, which was the WWE Women's Tag Team Championship. The title was originally scheduled to be defended, but the match was canceled just prior to the event as the defending champions were not medically cleared to compete. The 2019 event had also featured the 205 Live brand and its Cruiserweight Championship, but that brand and title were merged under NXT in late 2019.

==== Impact of the COVID-19 pandemic ====
Clash of Champions was originally scheduled to be held at the Prudential Center in Newark, New Jersey on September 20, 2020, but due to the COVID-19 pandemic that began taking effect in mid-March, New Jersey Governor Phil Murphy banned all large public gatherings and live public events of more than 50 people from March 16 onward. As a result of the pandemic, WWE had to present the majority of its programming from a behind closed doors set. Initially, Raw and SmackDown's shows were done at the WWE Performance Center in Orlando, Florida. A limited number of Performance Center trainees and friends and family members of the wrestlers were later utilized to serve as the live audience.

In late August, WWE's programs for Raw and SmackDown were moved to a bio-secure bubble called the WWE ThunderDome, which at the time was hosted at Orlando's Amway Center. The select live audience was no longer utilized as the bubble allowed fans to attend the events virtually for free and be seen on the nearly 1,000 LED boards within the arena. Additionally, the ThunderDome utilized various special effects to further enhance wrestlers' entrances, and arena audio was mixed with that of the chants from the virtual fans. With the change in location to the ThunderDome at the Amway Center, Clash of Champions was pushed back to September 27.

=== Storylines ===
The event comprised eight matches, including one on the Kickoff pre-show, that resulted from scripted storylines. Results were predetermined by WWE's writers on the Raw and SmackDown brands, while storylines were produced on WWE's weekly television shows, Monday Night Raw and Friday Night SmackDown.

At SummerSlam, Drew McIntyre defeated Randy Orton to retain the WWE Championship. The following night on Raw, McIntyre gloated about his victory against "the greatest wrestler ever" with a wrestling move (a backslide), and stated that he knew that Orton wanted a rematch. As McIntyre made his exit, Orton attacked McIntyre with two Punts. Later, Orton was confronted by former NXT wrestler Keith Lee, making his Raw debut. Lee, on behalf of McIntyre, challenged Orton to a match. The two faced each other that night; however, the match ended in a disqualification win for Orton after McIntyre attacked Orton. After the ensuing brawl, Orton performed a third Punt to McIntyre, taking him out for the next two weeks. Lee then faced Orton in a rematch and on behalf of McIntyre once again at Payback where Lee defeated Orton. On the following night's Raw, three singles matches were set up with the winners of each facing each other in a triple threat match that night to determine the number one contender for the WWE Championship at Clash of Champions. Orton, Lee, and Seth Rollins won their respective matches with Orton winning the ensuing triple threat to secure another title opportunity against McIntyre. Throughout the course of the September 7 episode, McIntyre performed three Claymore kicks to Orton. On the September 14 episode, McIntyre changed the stipulation of their match to an ambulance match. Also that night, due to the uncertainty if Orton would make it to Clash of Champions as a result of McIntyre's attacks the previous week, Lee faced McIntyre in a non-title match where if Lee won, he would replace Orton in the event that Orton could not compete at Clash of Champions; the match, however, ended in a no-contest when Retribution attacked both men. The following week, Lee faced McIntyre in a match with the stipulation being that Lee would replace Orton in the WWE Championship match if Orton was not medically cleared to compete. McIntyre won via disqualification when he was attacked by Orton.

At Payback, Big E and Matt Riddle won their respective matches against Sheamus and King Corbin while in the main event, a now heel Roman Reigns, who aligned himself with Paul Heyman, won the Universal Championship. On the following SmackDown, a fatal four-way match between Big E, Riddle, Corbin, and Sheamus was scheduled to determine the number one contender for the Universal Championship at Clash of Champions. However, Sheamus attacked Big E backstage, taking him out of the match. Big E was subsequently replaced by Reigns's own cousin Jey Uso, who won the fatal four-way to earn the title match against Reigns.

On the September 11 episode of SmackDown, Lucha House Party's Kalisto and Gran Metalik (accompanied by their fellow team member Lince Dorado) defeated SmackDown Tag Team Champions Cesaro and Shinsuke Nakamura in a non-title match. The following week, Cesaro and Nakamura were scheduled to defend the titles against Lucha House Party on the Clash of Champions Kickoff pre-show.

In May 2020, Sami Zayn was stripped of the Intercontinental Championship after refraining from competing during the COVID-19 pandemic. A tournament to determine a new champion was then won by AJ Styles on the June 12 episode of SmackDown. Jeff Hardy then defeated Styles to win the title on the August 21 episode; prior to the match, Styles attacked Hardy's leg, which led to medical personnel placing a knee brace on Hardy's injured leg. The following week, Styles interrupted Hardy, feeling that Hardy had cheated in their match as Hardy kicked Styles with his knee brace. As Hardy was leaving, however, Zayn returned with his own title belt, claiming that he was the true champion as he was never defeated. Zayn then attacked Hardy as Styles watched on and taunted Hardy afterward. Over the next few weeks, all three would bicker and state their claim on who was the real champion. The rivalry eventually reached a boiling point on the September 18 episode when an enraged Hardy announced that he would defend the Intercontinental Championship against Styles and Zayn in a triple threat ladder match at Clash of Champions. The following week, it was announced that in order to win the match, both title belts (Hardy's championship and Zayn's faux belt) must be retrieved to be declared the undisputed Intercontinental Champion.

On the September 14 episode of Raw, Asuka defeated Mickie James to retain the Raw Women's Championship, after which, Zelina Vega appeared and stated that she would be coming for the title. The following week, Vega defeated James to earn a title match at Clash of Champions.

At SummerSlam, The Street Profits (Angelo Dawkins and Montez Ford) defeated Andrade and Angel Garza to retain the Raw Tag Team Championship. Over the coming weeks, the two teams continued their feud and on the September 21 episode of Raw, Andrade and Garza won a triple threat tag team match to earn a title rematch at Clash of Champions.

At Payback, The Hurt Business's Bobby Lashley defeated Apollo Crews to win the United States Championship. The two also continued their feud over the next few weeks, and on the September 21 episode of Raw, a championship rematch was scheduled Clash of Champions.

==== Canceled match ====
At Payback, Nia Jax and Shayna Baszler won the WWE Women's Tag Team Championship from Bayley and Sasha Banks, while during the Kickoff pre-show, The Riott Squad (Ruby Riott and Liv Morgan) defeated The IIconics (Peyton Royce and Billie Kay). The following night on Raw, The Riott Squad faced The IIconics in a rematch with the added stipulation that the winning team would earn a shot at the Women's Tag Team Championship while the losing team would disband. The Riott Squad won the match and the title opportunity, while The IIconics had to disband as a team. The championship match was scheduled for Clash of Champions. However, just hours before the event, WWE announced that both Jax and Baszler were not medically cleared to compete and the match was canceled as a result.

== Event ==
Other on-screen personnel
| Role: | Name: |
|---|---|
| English commentators | Michael Cole (SmackDown) |
| English commentators | Corey Graves (SmackDown) |
| English commentators | Tom Phillips (Raw) |
| English commentators | Samoa Joe (Raw) |
| English commentators | Byron Saxton (Raw) |
| Spanish commentator | Carlos Cabrera |
| Ring announcers | Greg Hamilton (SmackDown) |
| Ring announcers | Mike Rome (Raw) |
| Referees | Jessika Carr |
| Referees | Chad Patton |
| Referees | Charles Robinson |
| Referees | Ryan Tran |
| Referees | Drake Wuertz |
| Referees | Rod Zapata |
| Interviewers | Charly Caruso |
| Interviewers | Kayla Braxton |
| Interviewers | Alyse Ashton |
| Pre-show panel | Charly Caruso |
| Pre-show panel | John "Bradshaw" Layfield |
| Pre-show panel | Peter Rosenberg |
| Pre-show panel | Booker T |

=== Pre-show ===
During the Clash of Champions Kickoff pre-show, it was announced that Women's Tag Team Champions Nia Jax and Shayna Baszler, who were scheduled to defend the titles against The Riott Squad (Ruby Riott and Liv Morgan), and Nikki Cross, who was set to face Bayley for the SmackDown Women's Championship, were not medically cleared to compete at the event. The Women's Tag Team Championship match was canceled while SmackDown Women's Champion Bayley was set to address her match during the pay-per-view.

Also during the pre-show, Cesaro and Shinsuke Nakamura defended the SmackDown Tag Team Championship against Lucha House Party (Kalisto and Lince Dorado, accompanied by Gran Metalik). Nakamura performed the Kinshasa on Kalisto who was on the receiving of a Giant Swing performed by Cesaro, to retain the titles.

=== Preliminary matches ===
The actual pay-per-view opened with Jeff Hardy defending the Intercontinental Championship against AJ Styles and Sami Zayn. There were many risky spots with Zayn being bounced off a ladder and Hardy being banged onto the handles off a ladder. Jeff Hardy performed a Swanton Bomb on Sami Zayn, who was lying on a ladder, to put him through it. After a back-and-forth match, Zayn obtained two pairs of handcuffs from his jacket pocket. He used the first handcuff on Hardy by threading it through Hardy's earlobe and cuffing Hardy to a ladder. Zayn then used the second pair to cuff both himself and Styles together. In the climax, Zayn unlocked his cuff (using a key that he was hiding in his mouth) and cuffed Styles, who was fighting Hardy, to the ladder. Zayn then ascended the ladder and unhooked both belts to become the undisputed Intercontinental Champion. Following the match, Zayn declared that he was not the new champion, but that he was still the champion as he had never lost the title in the first place.

In a quick backstage segment, an impromptu 24/7 Championship defense occurred when SmackDown's Drew Gulak pinned champion R-Truth to win the title for the first time.

Next, Asuka defended the Raw Women's Championship against Zelina Vega. In the end, Asuka forced Vega to submit the Asuka Lock to retain the title. Following the match, Asuka stated that Vega was not ready for her; however, she showed respect by bowing to Vega, who then attacked Asuka.

After that, Bobby Lashley (accompanied by MVP and Shelton Benjamin) defended the United States Championship against Apollo Crews (accompanied by Ricochet). Lashley forced Crews to tap out to the Hurt Lock to retain the title.

Next, The Street Profits (Angelo Dawkins and Montez Ford) defended the Raw Tag Team Championship against Andrade and Angel Garza. The ending saw what appeared to be a botched finish, as after Dawkins performed the Sky High slam on Andrade, he pinned Andrade, who kicked out at two but the referee still counted three for The Street Profits to retain the titles. It was later reported that Garza had sustained a knee injury and an audible was called to end the match.

Backstage, while new 24/7 Champion Drew Gulak was interviewed on winning the title earlier, R-Truth attacked Gulak with a steel catering bowl from behind and pinned him to regain the title for a record fortieth time.

Next, SmackDown Women's Champion Bayley came out to address her title match, in which she was originally scheduled to defend the title against Nikki Cross. As Cross was not medically cleared to compete, Bayley then issued an open challenge to any competitor for the title. After no one seemingly answered the call, Bayley started celebrating as if she had won by forfeit, however, Raw Women's Champion Asuka came out to accept the challenge. In the end, Bayley struck Asuka with a chair, thus Asuka won by disqualification, however, Bayley retained the title. Following the match, Bayley's former tag team partner Sasha Banks (who Bayley had turned on and attacked over the past few weeks) appeared and attacked Bayley with a steel chair.

In the penultimate match, Drew McIntyre defended the WWE Championship against Randy Orton in an ambulance match. Throughout the match, Orton was attacked by the legends whom he had attacked over the past few months, including Big Show, Christian, and Shawn Michaels. In the end, McIntyre performed the Claymore Kick on Orton and placed him in the back of the ambulance, however, before McIntyre closed the doors, he performed Orton's own maneuver, the Punt, on Orton (which Orton also used to take out the aforementioned legends) and then closed the doors of the ambulance to retain the title. Driving the ambulance was Ric Flair, another legend who was attacked by Orton.

=== Main event ===
In the main event, Roman Reigns (accompanied by Paul Heyman) defended the Universal Championship against his cousin Jey Uso. Reigns dominated Jey after which, he implored Jey to address him as the "Tribal Chief" and the head of the Anoaʻi family. Jey refused and eventually made a comeback, however, during a pin attempt, Reigns performed a low blow on Jey as he kicked out of the pin. Reigns then continued to assert his dominance on Jey, who refused to give in to Reigns' demands. Jey's injured brother Jimmy Uso then came out, ready to throw in the towel, however, Jey pleaded with him not to do so. In the closing moments, Reigns viciously beat down a practically unconscious Jey with a fury of blows, forcing Jimmy to throw in the towel, thus Reigns retained the title by technical knockout. Following the match, Jimmy tended to Jey and reluctantly told Reigns that he was the chief. Heyman then adorned Reigns with a garland as Reigns celebrated his victory.

== Reception ==
Bob Kapur of Slam Wrestling reviewed the event and gave it 5 out of 5 stars, calling the triple threat Intercontinental Championship ladder match "absolutely great. Lots of brutal ladder spots, a truly creative and innovative finish" and praised the Universal title main event for having "one of the best storyline executions in recent memory." He concluded that: "All of the in-ring matches delivered, with the Ladder match and Roman vs. Uso delivering in spades. For different reasons, both of them should be on the list of Match of the Year candidates. They pulled out some tricks to make the Ambulance Match better than it should have been. Even the stuff that wasn't great was still pretty good. Overall, an entertaining show from start to end." 411Mania's Scott Slimmer felt the Universal Championship main event "stole the show with absolutely fantastic storytelling and character development" and praised Hardy, Styles and Zayn for delivering in the triple threat Intercontinental title ladder match. He critiqued that the numerous cameos during the WWE Championship ambulance match was "nonsensical booking". Slimmer gave the event an 8.0 out of 10, saying: "Clash of Champions was probably the best WWE PPV of the Thunderdome era so far". Kevin Pantoja, also writing for 411Mania, praised the SmackDown Tag Title Kickoff, the triple threat ladder match for being "so refreshing to see creative and original ladder match spots after all this time", Vega's performance in the Raw Women's title bout and the storytelling throughout the Universal Championship main event. He felt the United States, Raw Tag Team and SmackDown Women's title bouts were "all fine but unspectacular" and called the WWE Championship ambulance match very good with its "spots and storytelling elements", but found it "overbooked at times" and made McIntyre look weak. Pantoja gave the event a 7.5 out of 10, calling it "better than expected, especially when you consider the changes that had to be made".

== Aftermath ==
=== Raw ===
The following night on Raw, WWE Champion Drew McIntyre opened the show and celebrated his victory over Randy Orton with Big Show, Ric Flair, Christian, and Shawn Michaels. Orton then appeared on the TitanTron and declared that his war with McIntyre was not over until he had captured the WWE Championship and then stated that McIntyre would pay for what he did. Proving to assert his dominance as a fighting champion, McIntyre then issued an open challenge to any competitor he had not yet faced. Later on the show, a returning Robert Roode, in his first appearance since March 2020, answered the challenge. McIntyre subsequently defeated Roode to retain the title. Before the end of the show, however, Orton once again attacked Big Show, Flair, Christian, and Michaels, who were playing poker in the legends room. The following week, Orton challenged McIntyre to another title match inside Hell in a Cell at the Hell in a Cell pay-per-view which McIntyre accepted.

Asuka defended the Raw Women's Championship against Zelina Vega in a rematch. Vega lost once again after submitting to the Asuka Lock.

Also on the following Raw, The Hurt Business (United States Champion Bobby Lashley, MVP, and Shelton Benjamin) faced the team of Apollo Crews, Ricochet, and Mustafa Ali in a six-man tag team match. Ali picked up the win for his team by pinning MVP.

The originally scheduled WWE Women's Tag Team Championship match, which did not take place at the event, would eventually take place on the October 5 episode of Raw. In the ensuing match, defending champions Nia Jax and Shayna Baszler defeated The Riott Squad (Ruby Riott and Liv Morgan) to retain the titles.

=== SmackDown ===
On the following episode of SmackDown, Universal Champion Roman Reigns (accompanied by Paul Heyman) came out to address what transpired at the pay-per-view. Reigns stated he did what he had to do and called Jey Uso out. Jey then came out and stated that Reigns had shown his true colors. However, Reigns stated that Jey failed to acknowledge him as the Tribal Chief of the family. Reigns stated that all he wanted to do was to give Jey the main event spotlight, however, Jey disgraced his family. After Reigns lambasted Jey further, he then gave Jey another rematch for the title at Hell in a Cell in a Hell in a Cell match. It was also announced that the match would be an "I Quit" match.

Also on the following SmackDown, Sasha Banks challenged Bayley for the SmackDown Women's Championship, scheduled for the following week, which was also the first night of the 2020 WWE Draft. On that subsequent episode, Banks defeated Bayley by disqualification after Bayley struck her with a steel chair, after which, Banks challenged Bayley for a rematch for the title at Hell in a Cell in a Hell in a Cell match. The match was made official the next day.

Jeff Hardy received a rematch for the Intercontinental Championship against Sami Zayn. Zayn retained after causing Hardy to fall and hit his head on an exposed turnbuckle.

=== Future ===
The 2020 Clash of Champions would in turn be the final Clash of Champions event. An event for 2021 was originally scheduled for September 26 at the Nationwide Arena in Columbus, Ohio; however, on July 9, 2021, WWE announced that Extreme Rules would instead take place on that date at that venue due to WWE rescheduling Money in the Bank to take place on Extreme Rules's original July date following WWE's resumption of live touring. Clash of Champions was in turn quietly discontinued without any further events being scheduled.

== Results ==
| No. | Results | Stipulations | Times |
|---|---|---|---|
| 1^{P} | Cesaro and Shinsuke Nakamura (c) defeated Lucha House Party (Kalisto and Lince Dorado) (with Gran Metalik) by pinfall | Tag team match for the WWE SmackDown Tag Team Championship | 10:45 |
| 2 | Sami Zayn defeated Jeff Hardy (c) and AJ Styles by retrieving the championship belts | Triple threat ladder match for the undisputed WWE Intercontinental Championship; Both championship belts (Hardy's real belt and Zayn's faux belt) had to be retrieved to win. | 26:35 |
| 3 | Asuka (c) defeated Zelina Vega by submission | Singles match for the WWE Raw Women's Championship | 7:05 |
| 4 | Bobby Lashley (c) (with MVP) defeated Apollo Crews (with Ricochet) by submission | Singles match for the WWE United States Championship | 8:15 |
| 5 | The Street Profits (Montez Ford and Angelo Dawkins) (c) defeated Andrade and Angel Garza by pinfall | Tag team match for the WWE Raw Tag Team Championship | 8:15 |
| 6 | Asuka defeated Bayley (c) by disqualification | Singles match for the WWE SmackDown Women's Championship | 3:45 |
| 7 | Drew McIntyre (c) defeated Randy Orton by trapping him in the ambulance with the doors completely closed | Ambulance match for the WWE Championship | 21:35 |
| 8 | Roman Reigns (c) (with Paul Heyman) defeated Jey Uso by technical knockout (Note: Jimmy Uso threw in the towel on the behalf of Jey Uso due to being unable to continue.) | Singles match for the WWE Universal Championship | 22:55 |
(c) / – the champion(s) heading into the match; P / – the match was broadcast on the pre-show
