= 205 Live (WWE brand) =

WWE professional wrestling roster division

- Logo for the brand and the 205 Live television program
- Product type: Professional wrestling Sports entertainment
- Current owner: WWE
- Produced by: Paul "Triple H" Levesque; Adam Pearce
- Country: United States
- Introduced: November 29, 2016 (Raw sub-brand); April 4, 2018 (standalone brand)
- Discontinued: February 15, 2022
- Related brands: Raw; SmackDown; ECW; NXT; NXT UK; Evolve
- Tagline: The Most Exciting Hour on Television
- General Manager: Drake Maverick (January 30, 2018 – April 12, 2020); William Regal (April 12, 2020 – January 5, 2022)

205 Live was a brand of the American professional wrestling promotion WWE that was established in November 2016 and discontinued in February 2022. Brands are divisions of WWE's roster where wrestlers are assigned to perform on a weekly basis when a brand extension is in effect. Wrestlers assigned to 205 Live primarily appeared on the brand's weekly television program, 205 Live. From October 2019 to February 2022, the brand served as a sub-brand of WWE's developmental territory, NXT, which allowed 205 Live wrestlers to also appear on its show, NXT.

205 Live originally only centered on male wrestlers that were promoted as weighing 205 lbs. and under – designated by WWE as cruiserweights. The cruiserweight division was revived by WWE in 2016 and was originally exclusive to the promotion's main brand, Raw, with 205 Live serving as a supplementary show for Raw's cruiserweight wrestlers until 205 Live was established as its own standalone brand in April 2018. 205 Live then merged under NXT in October 2019. Following the merger, the 205 Live show featured women's matches, and occasionally some non-cruiserweight wrestlers from NXT and NXT UK. In February 2022, the 205 Live program was replaced with NXT Level Up, marking the end of the 205 Live brand.

== History ==
=== 2016–2019 ===
WWE 205 Live was established following the success of the Cruiserweight Classic tournament to feature wrestlers who competed in the tournament and others who became full-time members of WWE's revived cruiserweight division (the original cruiserweight division had been dissolved in 2007). Paul "Triple H" Levesque, WWE executive producer and wrestler, stated the brand was designed to serve as a showcase for the division, with its own distinctive feel and style compared to WWE's other brands.

The Raw brand was originally established as the exclusive home of the division during the 2016 brand extension, with all cruiserweights being assigned to Raw following the 2016 WWE draft. While still under the Raw brand, the 205 Live show premiered on November 29, 2016; the main event of the inaugural episode saw Rich Swann defeat The Brian Kendrick for the WWE Cruiserweight Championship. Cruiserweights would appear on both Monday Night Raw and 205 Live for the next year and a half. However, following WrestleMania 34 in 2018, cruiserweight wrestlers ceased to appear on Raw, becoming exclusive to 205 Live and thus establishing the 205 Live brand as a separate brand from Raw.

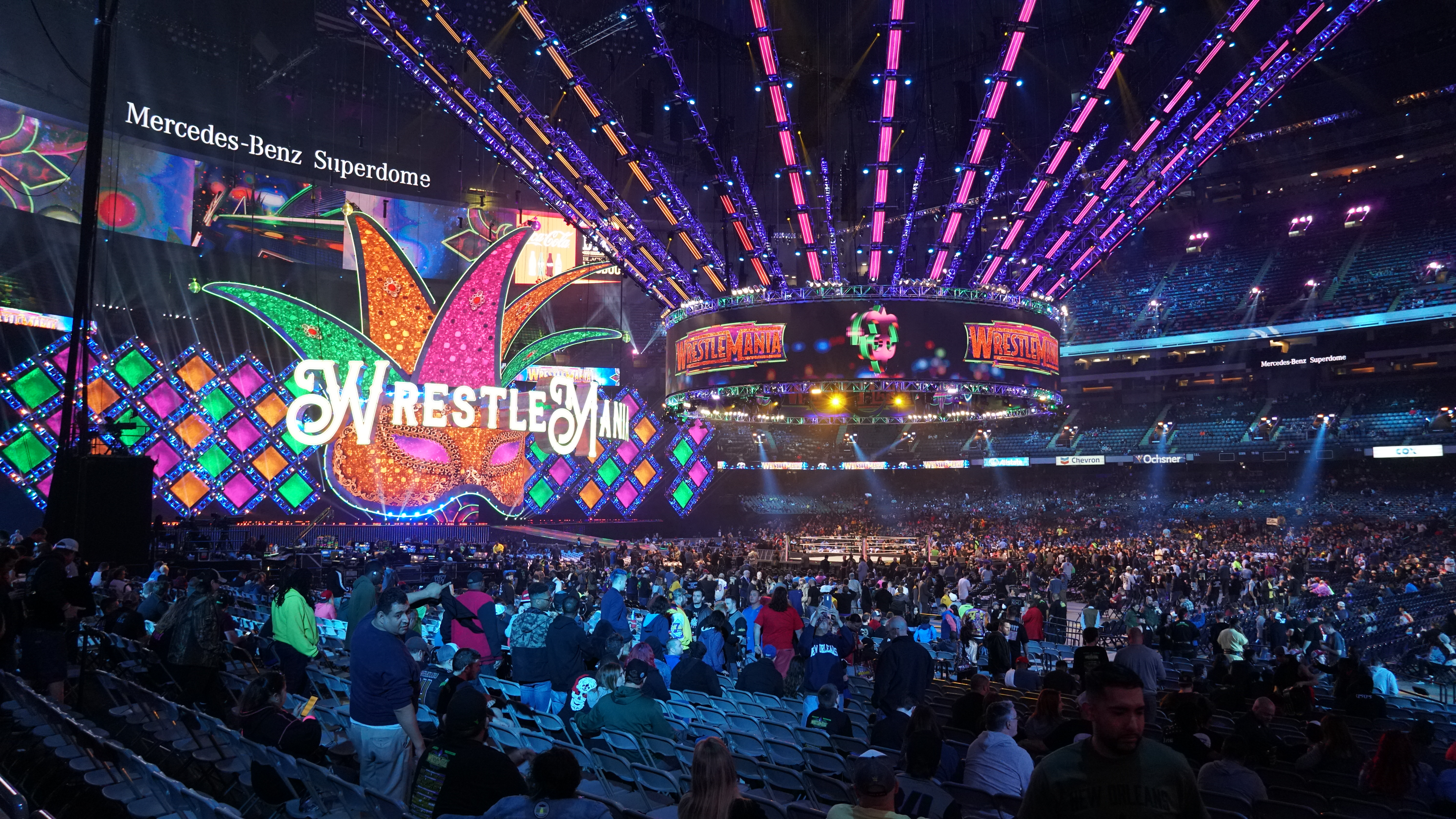
Following WrestleMania 34, 205 Live was launched as a standalone brand.

In January 2018, Triple H took over the creative side of 205 Live. On January 30, 2018, Drake Maverick was announced as the first on-screen General Manager. Maverick would announce a 16-man tournament for the vacant WWE Cruiserweight Championship, which was won by Cedric Alexander. Once the tournament begun, WWE's cruiserweight division began to wrestle exclusively on 205 Live and ceased to appear on Raw with select exceptions. Namely, Lucha House Party (Kalisto, Gran Metalik, and Lince Dorado) began competing in Raw's tag team division while Lio Rush and Drake Maverick began managing Raw superstars Bobby Lashley and AOP (Akam and Rezar), respectively, and occasionally competing in matches on Raw. Even though Maverick portrayed a heel while managing AOP on Raw, he was a face General Manager on 205 Live.

Although 205 Live had been separated from Raw, the brand was still featured on several of WWE's main pay-per-view (PPV) events with Raw and SmackDown until late 2019. That year's Clash of Champions was WWE's final main roster PPV to include a 205 Live feature match.

=== 2019–2022 ===
Prior to NXT moving to the USA Network in September 2019, NXT head Triple H spoke with Newsweek and said that "You'll start to see 205 [Live] begin to" become part of NXT. He said that 205 Live's talent would start moving towards NXT, that 205 Live had "become lost in [the] limbo", and that the Cruiserweight Championship would have more meaning on NXT where it could create more opportunities for the cruiserweight wrestlers. It was then reported that the NXT creative team would be in charge of 205 Live. The following month, the title began being defended on NXT and was renamed to NXT Cruiserweight Championship, officially becoming part of the NXT brand.

Since October 18, 2019, 205 Live began to include talent from NXT and vice versa. On April 12, 2020, Maverick would compete in the Interim NXT Cruiserweight Championship tournament, while he was replaced as General Manager by William Regal, who also served as NXT's General Manager.

On August 14, 2020, it was reported that retired professional wrestler and current WWE producer Adam Pearce and Dewey Foley, son of Mick Foley, were in charge of producing 205 Live.

By June 2021, the brand's roster had shrunk significantly due to several wrestlers being released; including Ariya Daivari, The Bollywood Boyz (Samir Singh and Sunil Singh), Ever-Rise (Jeff Parker and Matt Lee), August Grey, Curt Stallion, and former Cruiserweight Champion Tony Nese. In August 2021, Jake Atlas, Asher Hale, and Ari Sterling were also released.

On January 4, 2022, as part of the New Year's Evil episode of NXT 2.0, the NXT Cruiserweight Championship was unified with the NXT North American Championship. The Cruiserweight Championship was immediately retired after the match with the winner going forward as North American Champion. The following day, 205 Live General Manager William Regal was released from WWE. On February 15, PWInsider reported that WWE was ceasing the production of 205 Live episodes, replacing the series with NXT Level Up, which premiered in 205 Live's former Friday night timeslot on February 18. This marked the end of the 205 Live brand.

== Championships ==
=== Overview ===
The primary championship of 205 Live was the NXT Cruiserweight Championship, originally called the WWE Cruiserweight Championship before 205 Live merged under NXT. It was WWE's only championship with a weight limit, wherein only wrestlers 205 lb (93 kg) and under—designated as cruiserweights—could compete for the title.

One other championship was also available to the 205 Live brand. Introduced in May 2019, the WWE 24/7 Championship was a specialized championship in which it could be defended anytime, anywhere, as long as a WWE referee was present, allowing it to be defended on any brand. While 205 Live was discontinued in February 2022, the championship remained active until November 2022. After Nikki Cross won the title on the November 7 episode of Raw, she discarded the belt in a trash can backstage and two days later, it was listed as inactive on WWE.com.

Former WWE wrestler Jack Gallagher revealed in July 2021 that WWE had also planned to introduce a Cruiserweight Tag Team Championship, which would have been distinct from the short-lived WCW Cruiserweight Tag Team Championship that the then-WWF acquired along with the assets of WCW in 2001; these plans, however, were dropped.

=== Previous championships ===
Championship	Final champion(s)	Reign	Date won	Location	Notes	Ref.
NXT Cruiserweight Championship	Carmelo Hayes	1	January 4, 2022	Orlando, FL	Defeated Roderick Strong to unify the championship with the NXT North American Championship.	

=== Other championships used by 205 Live ===
Championship	Final champion(s) recognized by 205 Live	Reign	Date won	Location	Notes	Ref.
WWE 24/7 Championship (Note: The championship was shared amongst all of WWE's brands, with 205 Live recognizing the championship until the brand was dissolved on February 15, 2022.)	Reggie	3	February 14, 2022	Indianapolis, IN	Pinned Dana Brooke in a restaurant to win the championship.	
