= Bookmark (disambiguation) =

A bookmark is used to keep one's place in a printed work. It can also refer to:

- Bookmark (World Wide Web), an address saved in a web browser
- Bookmarks (album), 2013 album by Five for Fighting
- Bookmarks (magazine), an American literary magazine
- Bookmark (TV series), a BBC Two TV series
- Bookmarks (TV program), an educational television show on Netflix
- Bookmarks (bookshop), a socialist bookshop in London
- Bookmark Biosphere Reserve, South Australia
- Bookmarking, method of genetic communication
- Enterprise bookmarking, a method of applying tags to data and content to improve enterprise search
- Social bookmarking, a method for internet users to store, organize, and share links to web pages
- Book Marks, a review aggregation website of Literary Hub
- Bookmark, a television show on PBS from 1989 to 1991 hosted by Lewis H. Lapham
