= Death of Ricky Reel =

1997 death in the United Kingdom

Ricky Reel
- Reel shortly before his death
- Born: 11 July 1977
- Died: October 1997 (aged 20); Kingston upon Thames, London, England
- Cause of death: Open verdict
- Education: Brunel University

Lakhvinder "Ricky" Reel, a 20-year-old British man, died in October 1997 in London, United Kingdom. He was last seen alive in the early morning of 15 October and on 21 October his body was recovered from the River Thames near Down Hall Road, in the town centre of Kingston upon Thames.

Reel and his friends were subject to a racially motivated attack shortly before his death, but the Metropolitan Police deemed this as unrelated and initially closed the case as an accidental death. Reel's family initiated a campaign for justice which saw this overturned – an open verdict was declared instead and witness intimidation was reported. A complaint regarding numerous failures during the course of the police investigation was upheld by the Police Complaints Authority. It was later also revealed that the Metropolitan Police's undercover Special Demonstration Squad had spied on Reel's family as a result of their campaigning.

Reel's mother, Sukhdev, continues to seek justice on the belief that her son was murdered and that police failures have been related to racism.

== Incident and death ==
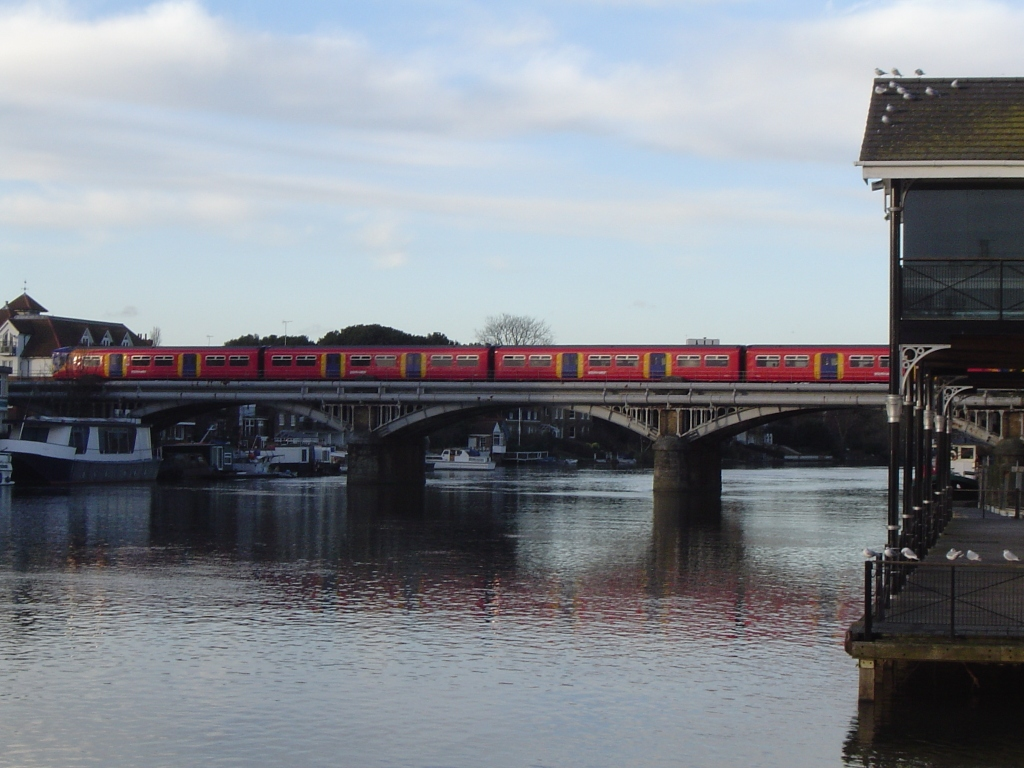
Kingston Railway Bridge near where Reel's body was found

At the time of his death, Reel was a computer science student at Brunel University. He and three friends had gone for an evening out drinking at Options night club in Kingston upon Thames on 14 October. A British Sikh, Reel and his friends (all Asian men studying at Brunel) were racially abused in Kingston town centre by a group of young white men, who noticed one of the group's dastar (Sikh headwear) and said "Pakis go home". There was a violent altercation between the groups, during which time Reel separated from his friends and was not seen thereafter.

On the night of his disappearance, Ricky's mother, Sukhdev Reel, a Nairobi-born Sikh who moved to London in the 1960s and worked as a housing officer for the London Borough of Hounslow, was surprised by his failure to return home to West Drayton that night and contacted local hospitals and police to report him missing. The police informed her that she would need to wait 24 hours to lodge a missing persons report, given Reel's age. The police contacted the three men who had been with Reel that evening and they stated they had been racially abused and assaulted at the time they had last seen him.

The Reel family and local community initiated a search for him over the following days, including producing leaflets, appealing for any witnesses to share information, taking local bus routes, check nearby abandoned buildings and asking for any CCTV footage. The family passed all information to the police and continued to push them to conduct a search of the stretch of the river Thames near to where he was last seen. Within seven minutes of the police beginning dredging of the river, Reel's body was found.

== Investigation and police complaint ==
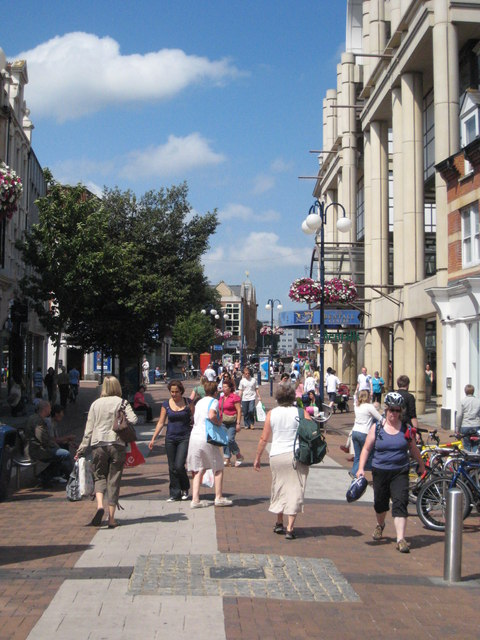
Clarence Street in Kingston, which Reel visited shortly before his death

The initial report ruled that Reel's was an accidental death, which had occurred due to him falling into the river while urinating, and the case was closed. This was based on the fact Reel's trouser fly button was undone when his body was recovered. The family repeatedly requested that this be reviewed and accused the investigators of neglect of duty. Due to this pressure, Kingston Police referred the case to the Police Complaints Authority (PCA) in January 1998, with the Metropolitan Police's head of Kingston, Superintendent Peter Lally, stating "There are no suspicious circumstances at all but because of the allegations we have asked the PCA to investigate. I am quite satisfied with police actions on this case." Detective SuperIntendent Bob Moffat, who led the investigation, said there was "bundles of evidence" that Reel had died from an accidental fall into the river.

Sukhdev and Balwant Reel, Ricky's parents, accused the police of multiple failures in the course of the case. They said Sukhdev had been shouted at by an operator after a follow up call to request police to their house the day after her son went missing. When trying to file a missing persons report they claimed an officer told them their son was possibly trying to avoid an arranged marriage or that he was gay. They stated that it was the family who had had to lead on the missing persons search, with little assistance from the police, including the locating of key CCTV evidence from the area. They said the police had failed to properly log either the incident of a racial abuse when reported by Reel's friends and family during the course of the investigation or file the missing persons report, and had not asked for an e-fit of the suspects in the racial abuse case. The police returned the clothes Reel was wearing when he died to the family without doing a forensic analysis and when Sukhdev reported a large tear in his shirt she said they accused her of damaging the clothes. The officer informing the parents of their son's death also informed three of the family's other children in the absence of their parents, when the parents instead would have preferred to inform them separately. Furthermore, an independent pathologist the family hired found Reel's bladder had been full at the time of his death and that a third party was probably involved in his drowning.

The outcome of the PCA inquiry, produced by Surrey Police in February 1999, found "weaknesses and flaws within the organisational structure and policy" and that PC Penman, PC Lord and Det Supt Moffat had been neglectful in their duties. It confirmed that PC Penman had not logged the racially motivated incident and a missing person report in a timely manner. It noted PC Lord had been "insensitive" in directly sharing the news their Reel's death with his siblings before telling the parents. It also noted failures to properly secure evidence by Det Supt Moffat, who was admonished following the PCA inquiry. The solicitor for the Reel family, Louise Christian, was critical of this response as it did not provide detail of the failures, nor outline missed lines of inquiry and she called it "just a public relations exercise". The PCA inquiry was not made public and while Sukhdev Reel was allowed to read it, this was done only on condition she could not discuss it with others. It was later revealed that the inquiry confirmed important CCTV footage was destroyed before being viewed and that the coroner had found that pages from the initial report were missing.

In October 1999, following national coverage on crime television series Crimewatch, Local Member of Parliament John McDonnell used parliamentary privilege to make public some parts of the PCA inquiry which had been withheld. This confirmed that the area where Reel was presumed to have fallen into the river was not forensically analysed, that a nearby railing was not searched for fingerprints, no foliage around the area was analysed and a concrete block key to the case was not examined beyond taking photographs. It also shows that the attackers in the incident immediately prior to his disappearance were known to have taken the 281 bus afterwards, yet no further investigation was undertaken which the report said was "a significant omission". The PCA inquiry found the Metropolitan police had not progressed any other lines of inquiry since 1997, nor had it reviewed Reel's mobile phone data from the period.

A further inquest into Reel's death occurred in November 1999. The acting coroner, Dr John Burton, overruled the initial conclusion of accidental death and instead recorded an open verdict, stating that "there is not enough evidence to reach a conclusion". As part of the inquiry, the initial lead investigator, Bob Moffat (who had since retired), was questioned by Michael Mansfield QC and strongly defended his actions, stating there was "no evidence that there was anyone else associated with her son's death". He criticised the amount of money spent on the additional inquest and inquiry compared to the resources he had to initially investigate. Moffat stated that his initial line of investigation was into Reel's friends, looking for holes in their story of a racially motivated attack and said "maybe the boys were engaged in a prank with Ricky in the river". Detective Chief Inspector Sue Hill, who took over the case after Moffat accepted the findings of the PCA inquiry and that mistakes had been made and apologised. However, she agreed with Moffat's belief that Reel's death was accidental, saying: "I have still not found anybody that could take this matter any further and I have tried."

Dr Burton noted that witnesses had told him in court that they and their families had been threatened and pressured not to testify. The three friends with Reel on the evening of the racial attack said they had received death threats, and one had been kidnapped and assaulted on 3 November, the day of Reel's funeral.

The jury of the inquest confirmed an open verdict, which had included a statement from Home Office pathologist Dr Ian West which described bruising on Reel's back which "didn’t exclude a fight where a blow or a couple of blows had been landed". Sukhdev Reel claimed this fact contradicted the police's assessment that Reel had fallen forward into the river while urinating and later said "there was racism in his disappearance, there was racism in his murder and there was racism in his investigation".

== Justice campaign ==
Following the incident, Sukhdev Reel began working with anti-racist charity Southall Monitoring Group, later known as The Monitoring Group. The group supported her in a campaign for justice for her son, having been involved with similar cases, including the murder of Stephen Lawrence and the death of Blair Peach.

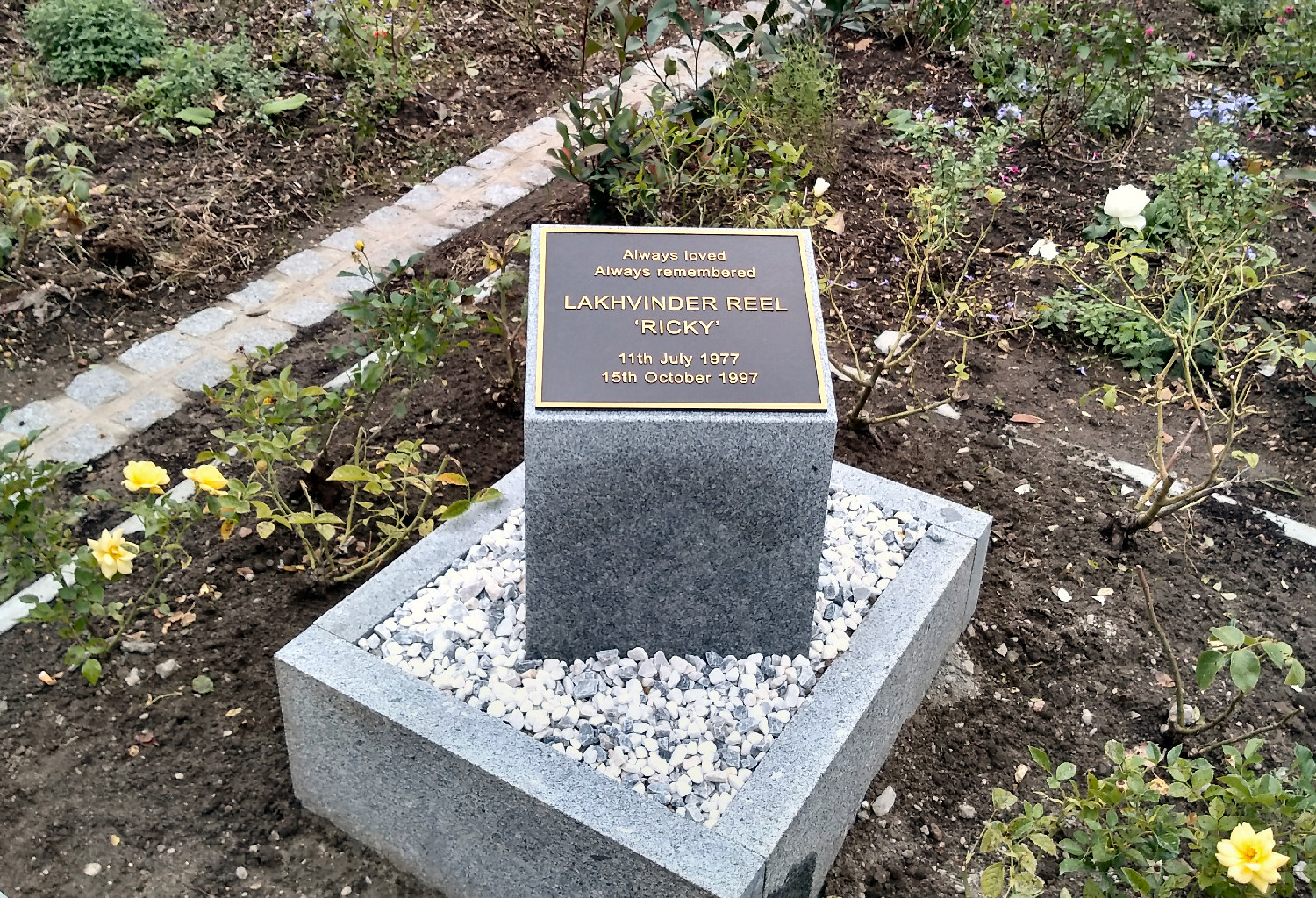
Memorial by Kingston Bridge

The death of Ricky Reel came within the context of many racially motivated murders of South Asian men within the British capital in the 1990s, including Panchadcharam Sahitharan, Navid Sadiq, Rohit Duggal, Ruhullah Aramesh, Sher Singh Sagoo, Fiaz Mirza, Mohan Singh Kullar and Manish Patel.

In 2013, a new witness came forward to Reel's family, saying she had information about a convicted murderer who might be involved in Reel's death. Police dismissed this, noting that the witness was frightened to provide a statement, had learning disabilities and "may not be credible".

A website, "Justice for Ricky Reel", was set up to continue campaigning. A TV documentary was produced by Steven Drew in 2014, called What Happened to Ricky Reel. Online magazine The Justice Gap chose to interview Reel's mother on their first podcast in December 2020.

Marking 25 years since his death, Sukhdev Reel published at book Ricky Reel: Silence Is Not An Option via Bookmarks, covering her fight for justice.

== Spying on family ==
In 2014, Sukhdev Reel was informed by police officers conducting Operation Herne, an investigation into misconduct in undercover policing, that she had been spied upon inappropriately by police officers during her campaign for justice. She had been subject to ten reports by officers from the Metropolitan Police's Special Demonstration Squad, who had infiltrated political groups. The police called this "collateral intrusion" rather than specific targeting of the family's campaign. Former SDS officer and whistleblower Peter Francis described this as a "half-truth" given the remit of the SDS was to spy on a broad range of activists rather than target individual campaigns.

Sukhdev Reel responded to this revelation by saying: "We have no idea why they spied on us. We were not doing anything illegal. Our campaign was always peaceful. We are angry and hurt that they breached our human rights and invaded our privacy at a time we were asking them to investigate Ricky’s murder. The resources that they should have spent on investigating Ricky’s murder were spent on spying."

== See also ==
- Death of Christopher Kapessa
- List of unsolved deaths
- List of solved missing person cases: 1990s
