= The New Day (professional wrestling) =

Professional wrestling stable

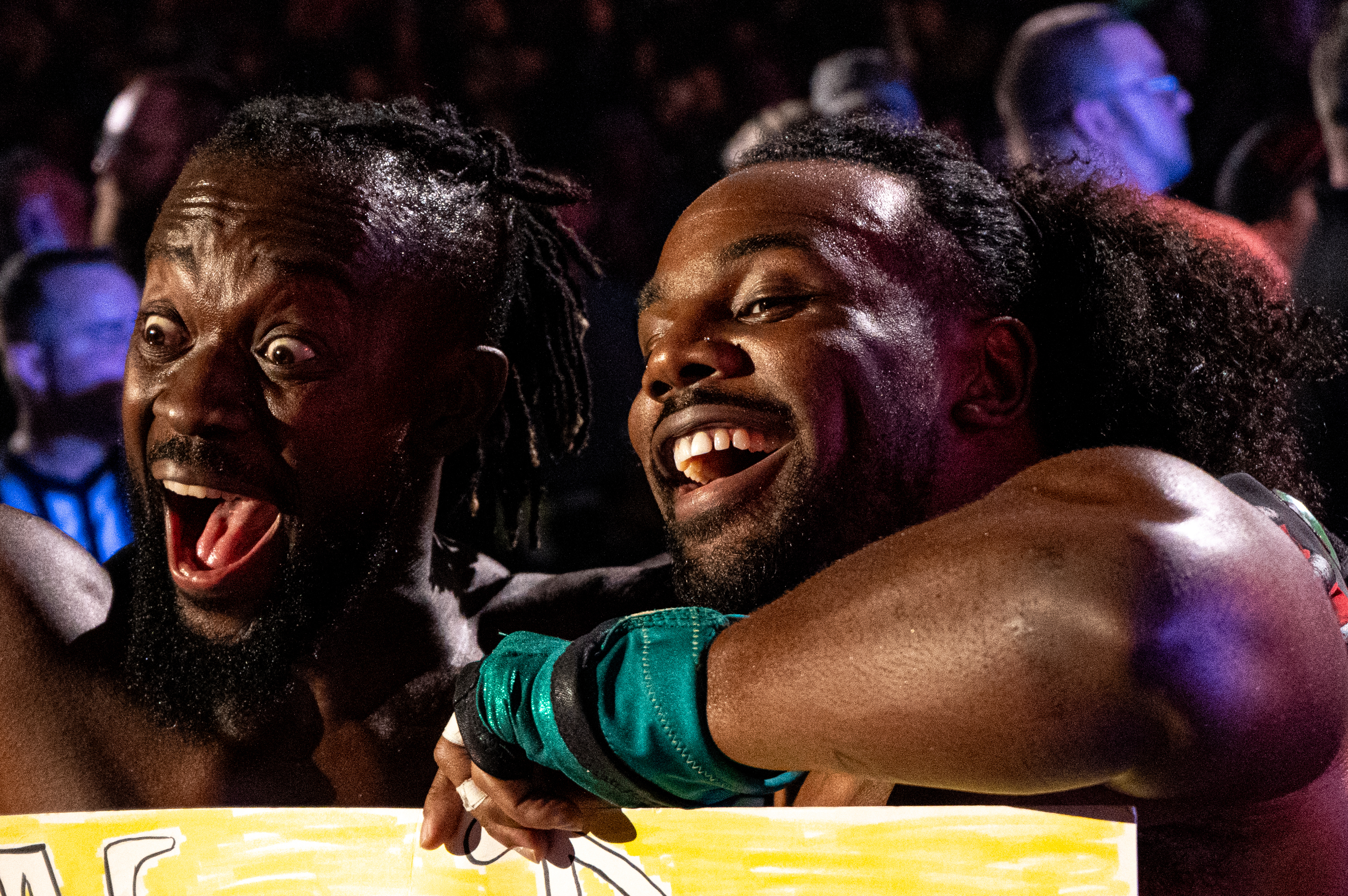
- Kofi (left) and Austin Creed (right) in 2024

Tag team
- Name(s): The New Day; The New Level
- Members: Kofi Kingston / Kofi; Xavier Woods / Austin Creed
- Manager: Prince Nana
- Billed heights: Kofi: 6 ft 0 in (1.83 m); Creed: 5 ft 11 in (1.80 m)
- Combined billed weight: 417 lb (189 kg)
- Former members: Big E
- Debut: July 21, 2014
- Years active: 2014–present

The New Level is a professional wrestling tag team consisting of Austin Creed and Kofi. As of August 2026, they are signed to All Elite Wrestling (AEW), where they are two-thirds of the reigning AEW World Trios Champions with Swerve Strickland in their record-tying second reign as a team. They are best known for their time in WWE as a stable with Big E called The New Day from 2014 to 2026.

As The New Day, they held several records, including the most reigns as SmackDown Tag Team Champions at seven, and the longest-reigning Raw Tag Team Champions at 483 days. As a team, they also hold the record for most WWE-branded tag team championship reigns at 13 (seven SmackDown, five Raw, and one NXT). While performing as a stable in WWE, The New Day defended their tag team titles under the Freebird rule, with all three members being recognized as champions.

The stable was prominently formed on the July 21, 2014, episode of Raw, but made their debut as The New Day on the November 28, 2014 episode of SmackDown. In April 2015 at Extreme Rules, they won their first WWE Tag Team Championship. Their second reign, which began at that year's SummerSlam in August, became the longest male tag team championship reign in WWE history until it was surpassed by The Usos (Jey Uso and Jimmy Uso) in 2022. The team would go on to win the SmackDown Tag Team Championship a record seven times and, after winning the NXT Tag Team Championship, they became the third WWE Tag Team Triple Crown Champions. As singles wrestlers, both Kingston and Big E won the WWE Championship, while Woods won the 2021 King of the Ring tournament. In March 2022, Big E suffered a cervical fracture which led to an indefinite in-ring hiatus, while Kingston and Woods would continue to compete as a tag team. Kingston and Woods removed Big E from the group in December 2024, and Big E announced his retirement in 2025.

The early months of the stable as stereotypical black gospel babyface characters were marked by largely negative reactions from fans and critics alike, but after transitioning their characters into heels fanatically obsessed with the nostalgia-style "power of positivity" in April 2015, they began to receive acclaim for their entertainment value, as well as for their in-ring performances. In 2015, the trio were collectively named "WWE Wrestler of the Year" by Rolling Stone, while also being recognized as the "Best Gimmick" of the year by the Wrestling Observer Newsletter. Additionally, they became the first trio to win the Pro Wrestling Illustrated award for "Tag Team of the Year", doing so in 2015 and 2016. Their new-found popularity resulted in the trio reverting to babyfaces in early 2016, which they remained as until December 2024, when Kingston and Woods reverted back to being heels after Big E's removal from the group. Kingston and Woods then left WWE in May 2026 and signed with AEW as The New Level (Kofi and Austin Creed, respectively) that August.

The three, who are close friends in real life, also appear or work together outside of wrestling, writing the 2016 book The Book of Booty: Shake It. Love It. Never Be It, and hosting a weekly podcast, Feel the Power, from 2019 to 2023.

== Background ==
After wrestling in WWE's developmental territories Deep South Wrestling (DSW), Ohio Valley Wrestling (OVW), and Florida Championship Wrestling (FCW) since September 2006, Kofi Kingston made his WWE debut on ECW in January 2008. He subsequently came to have an extensive singles career, becoming a four-time Intercontinental Champion and a three-time United States Champion; he had also been part of several tag teams, including with CM Punk, Evan Bourne and R-Truth, all of whom he won tag team championships with. Big E began his career in FCW and then in NXT, where he became NXT Champion. On the December 17, 2012 episode of Raw, he made his main roster debut aligning himself with Dolph Ziggler and AJ Lee and later winning the Intercontinental Championship. Xavier Woods, who previously wrestled in Total Nonstop Action Wrestling as Consequences Creed, signed to WWE in 2010 and worked in FCW and NXT until the November 18, 2013 episode of Raw, when he made his main roster debut.

Woods, then in college, had first met Kingston in 2006 or 2007 when he had entered the DSW building to apply for a wrestling job, and Kingston was working in the ring at the exact same moment. Woods got the job, but DSW closed soon after; when Woods came to FCW two years later to similarly apply for another wrestling job, Kingston was, coincidentally, once again present and working in the ring.

The stable originated from an idea backstage by Woods, who, pitched it to WWE Writer Michael Notarile, after not being given storylines or much time on-screen, worked on creating a "snarky, intelligent, running his mouth, just like total punk" heel character for himself. As his friend Big E was in a similar situation career-wise, Woods and Notarile decided to work together with Big E to form a team instead, spending several weeks taping promos and pitching ideas in order to create their new characters. The three men felt that something was still missing from the team, and they had the idea of including Kingston, who was also at a low point of his career; however, they had doubts that WWE would let Kingston, who had been a babyface his entire career, turn heel, and changed the characters so they would be babyfaces who, according to Woods, were "three guys, who came from kind of the same background, that just want more from life, more from their jobs, more from their friends, more from everything around them." In October 2020, the trio stated that they had considered adding a woman to the group, with Sasha Banks being their top pick. Big E also revealed that Alicia Fox and Damien Sandow were considered to be additions to the faction.

== History ==
=== WWE (2014–2026) ===
==== Original run and gospel era (2014–2015) ====
On the July 21, 2014, episode of Raw, after Big E and Kingston, who had started pairing up in tag team matches earlier the same month, suffered another loss in what had been ongoing losing streaks for both men. Woods came down to address the two and declared that they could not "move ahead by kissing babies, shaking hands, and singing and dancing like a puppet", and that it would be their time to "find purpose", and that they "do not ask any longer", but "take". The duo then joined Woods and on the following day on Main Event, he managed Big E and Kingston to a decisive victory over Slater-Gator (Heath Slater and Titus O'Neil). However, the group disappeared from television soon after due to WWE creative being unconvinced by their gimmick; they continued to make appearances together at house shows in two-on-two tag team matches, regularly switching the two competing members while the third one acted as manager.

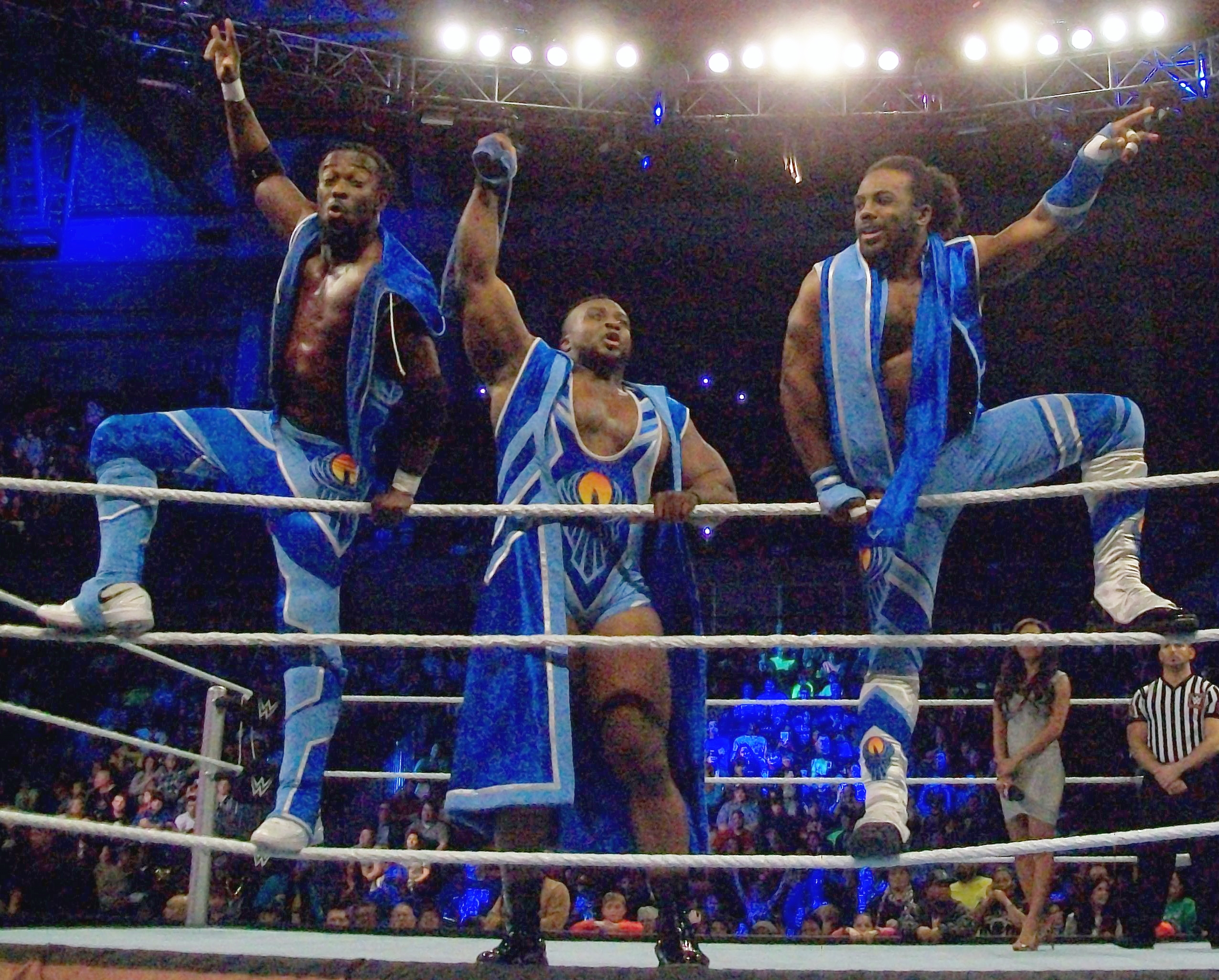
The New Day appearing in their gospel era blue outfits on Main Event in January 2015

From the November 3 episode of Raw, WWE began airing vignettes for Big E, Kingston, and Woods, with the stable now being billed as The New Day, displaying a heroic black gospel gimmick. The New Day made their in-ring debut on the November 28 episode of SmackDown in a winning effort against Curtis Axel, Heath Slater, and Titus O'Neil. On the December 1 episode of Raw, Kingston and Woods competed in a tag team turmoil match to determine the number one contenders for the WWE Tag Team Championship, eliminating Gold and Stardust, before being eliminated by Tyson Kidd and Cesaro. At the TLC: Tables, Ladders & Chairs pre-show on December 14, Big E and Kingston defeated Gold and Stardust.

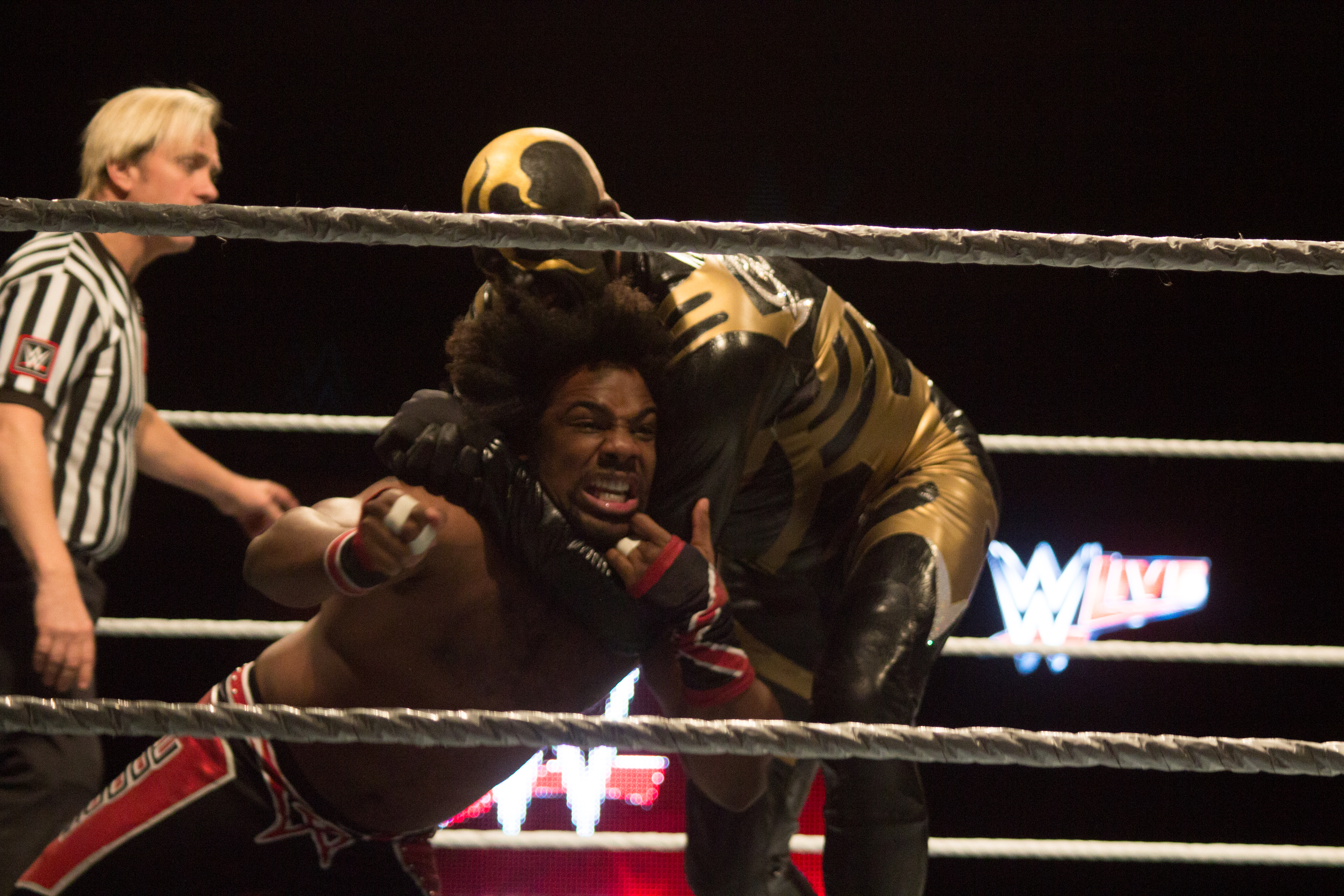
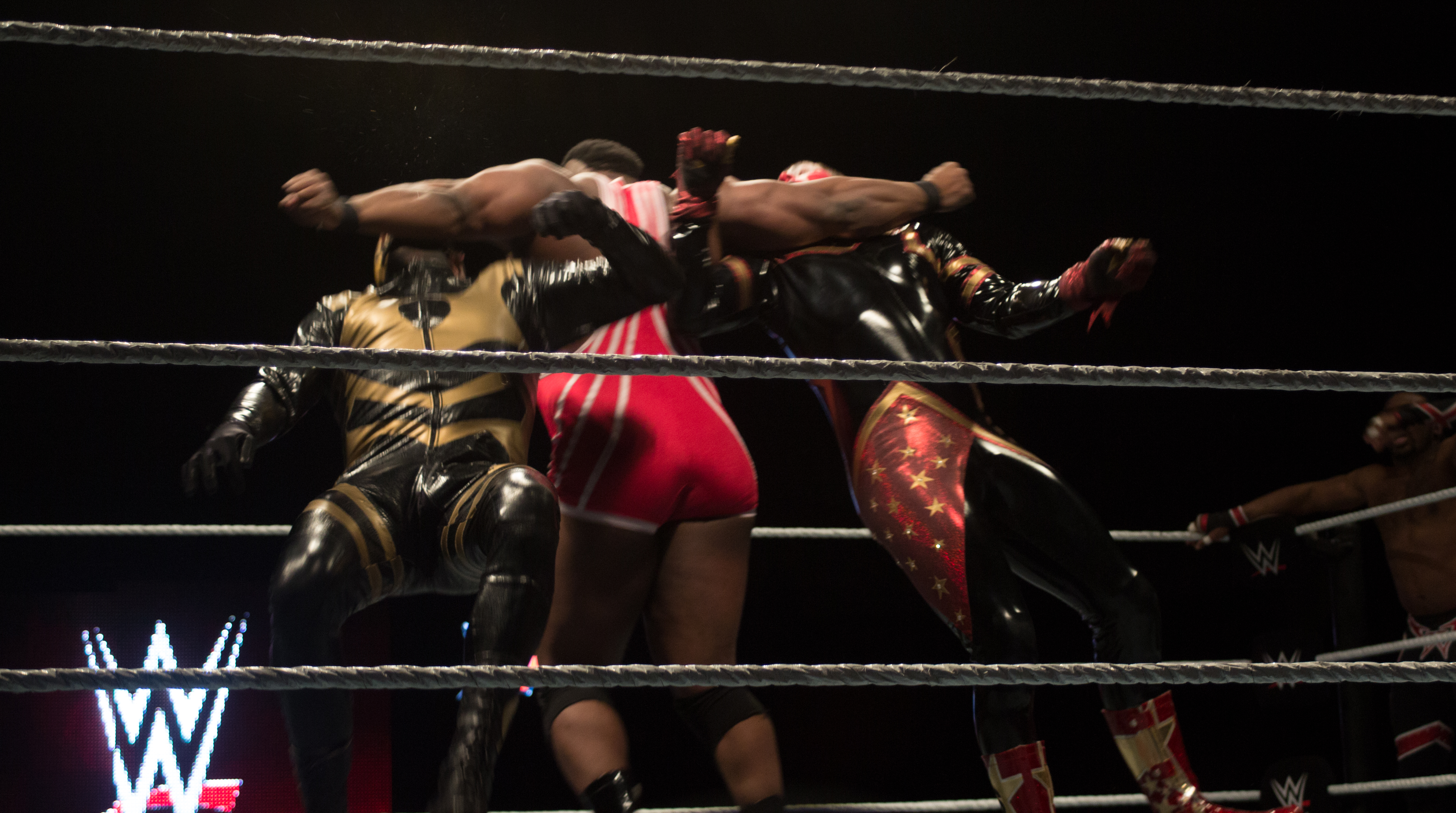
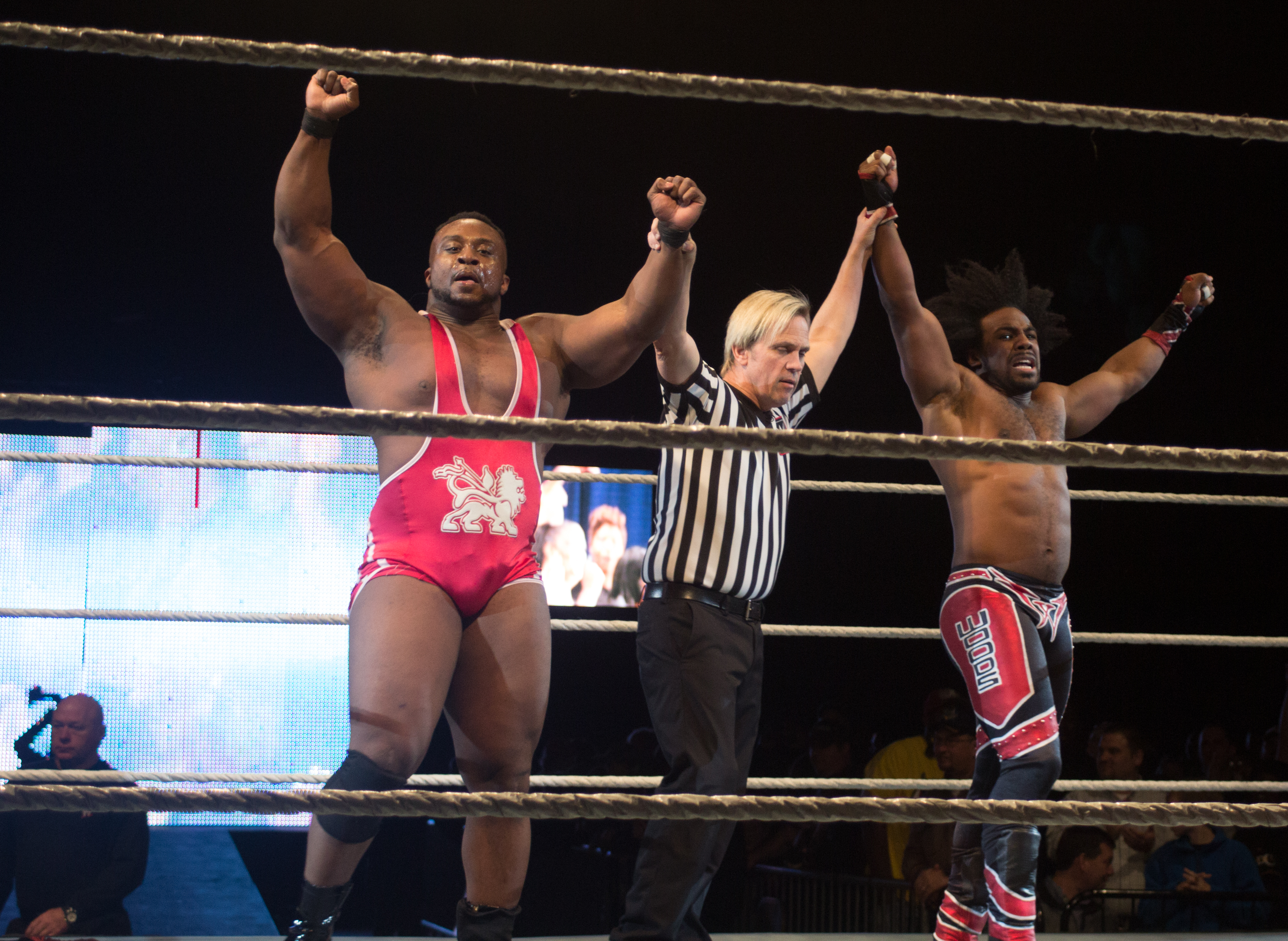
The New Day at a live event in January 2015

On the January 5, 2015, episode of Raw, while Big E was on his way to a victory against Adam Rose, the team of Kidd and Cesaro, masquerading as Rosebuds, interfered by laying out Woods on the outside and performing their finisher on Big E in the ring. At the Royal Rumble, The New Day's winning streak came to an end when Tyson Kidd and Cesaro defeated Big E and Kingston. A fatal four-way match for the WWE Tag Team Championship took place on the WrestleMania 31 pre-show on March 29, including The New Day, but they failed to win the championship.

==== Longest-reigning Tag Team Champions (2015–2016) ====
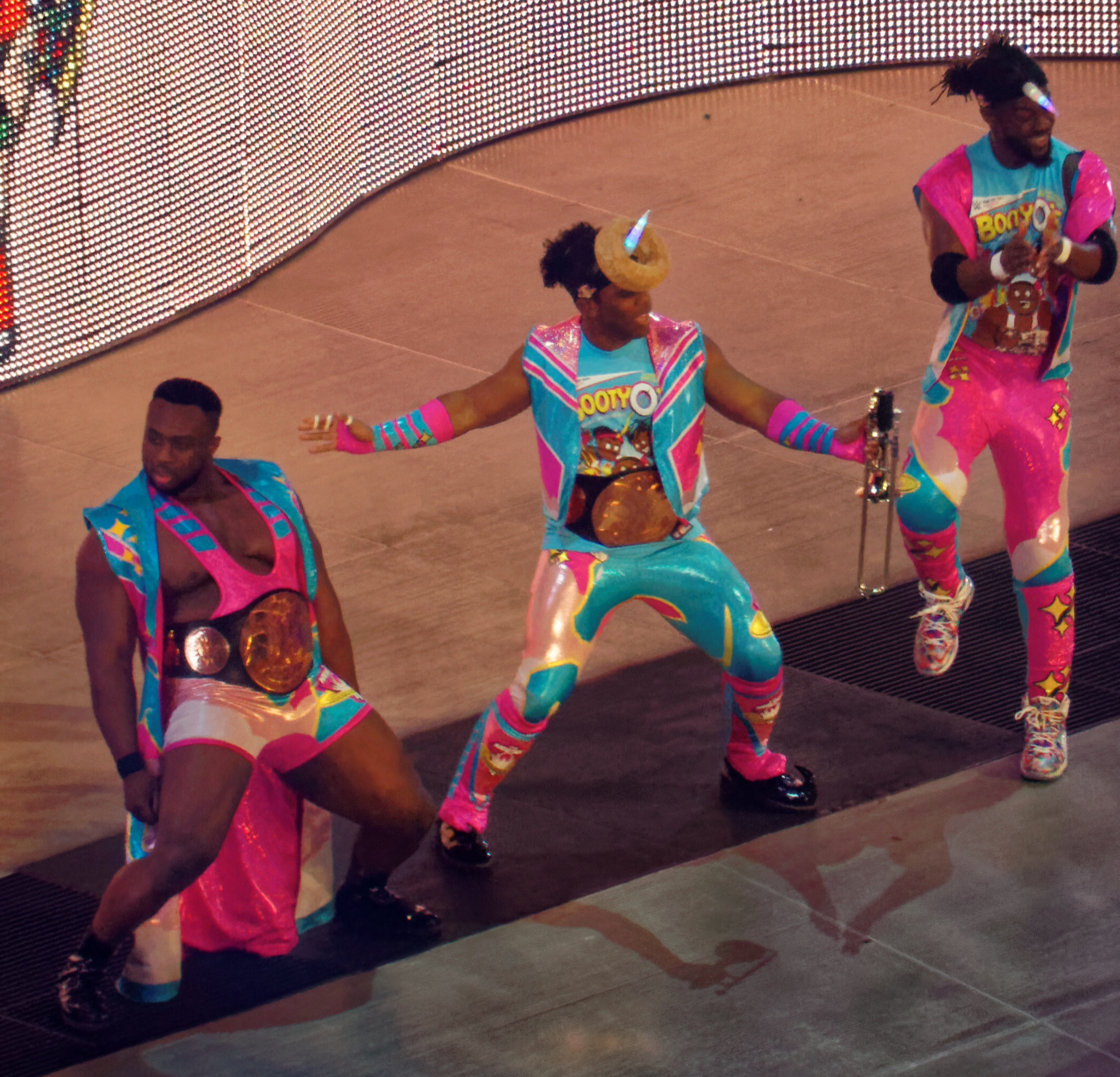
The New Day appearing on the Raw after WrestleMania 32

On the March 30 episode of Raw, they were involved in an eight-man tag team match alongside The Lucha Dragons (Kalisto and Sin Cara) against Kidd, Cesaro, and The Ascension. During the match, the live audience responded negatively to The New Day with loud "New Day sucks!" chants which carried over into the following weeks. When asked about the crowd's disapproval of them in a backstage interview on the April 6 episode of Raw, The New Day claimed that they were hurt and responded in a more aggressive tone, yet maintained their upbeat nature. During their following match against The Lucha Dragons, Kingston attempted a cheap shot from the outside, even though he was not actually involved in the bout, turning all three men into heels in the process. On the April 20 episode of Raw, The New Day defeated The Lucha Dragons via countout to become the number one contenders for the WWE Tag Team Championship after Woods held onto Sin Cara's feet to prevent him from re-entering the ring.

At Extreme Rules on April 26, The New Day defeated Kidd and Cesaro to capture the WWE Tag Team Championship; Big E and Kingston were the participants in the match, but WWE also recognized Woods as champion under the Freebird Rule, in which any two members of a stable could defend the title. At Payback on May 17, Big E and Kingston defeated Kidd and Cesaro in a two-out-of-three falls match to retain the WWE Tag Team Championship after Woods pinned Cesaro, despite not being a legal participant in the match. At Elimination Chamber on May 31, all three New Day members competed in the first-ever tag team Elimination Chamber match for the WWE Tag Team Championship, where they lastly eliminated The Prime Time Players (Darren Young and Titus O'Neil) to retain their title. However, at Money in the Bank on June 14, Big E and Woods lost the championships to The Prime Time Players. Big E and Kingston then lost their rematch at Battleground on July 19. The New Day would regain the championship after they defeated Los Matadores (Diego and Fernando), The Lucha Dragons, and The Prime Time Players in a fatal four-way match at SummerSlam on August 23. Despite being heels, the trio received heavy positive reactions from audiences who began to chant "New Day rocks!". The following night on Raw, they were attacked by the returning Dudley Boyz (Bubba Ray Dudley and D-Von Dudley) with Woods being put through a table. This started a feud between the two teams, setting up a title match at Night of Champions on September 20, where Big E and Kingston lost by disqualification, though, by rule, they retained their title. They lost via disqualification to retain their championship again in a rematch against The Dudley Boyz at WWE Live from Madison Square Garden, but defeated them via pinfall at Hell in a Cell on October 25 to retain the title, thus ending their feud. The New Day led their own team at Survivor Series including Sheamus and King Barrett, but left the match prematurely to tend to Big E after his elimination, leading to their team's eventual loss. At TLC: Tables, Ladders & Chairs on December 13, they retained the WWE Tag Team Championship against The Lucha Dragons and The Usos (Jey Uso and Jimmy Uso) in a triple threat ladder match. The New Day then successfully defended their title against The Lucha Dragons on the special December 22 episode of Super SmackDown Live! and against The Usos on January 24, 2016, at the Royal Rumble event.

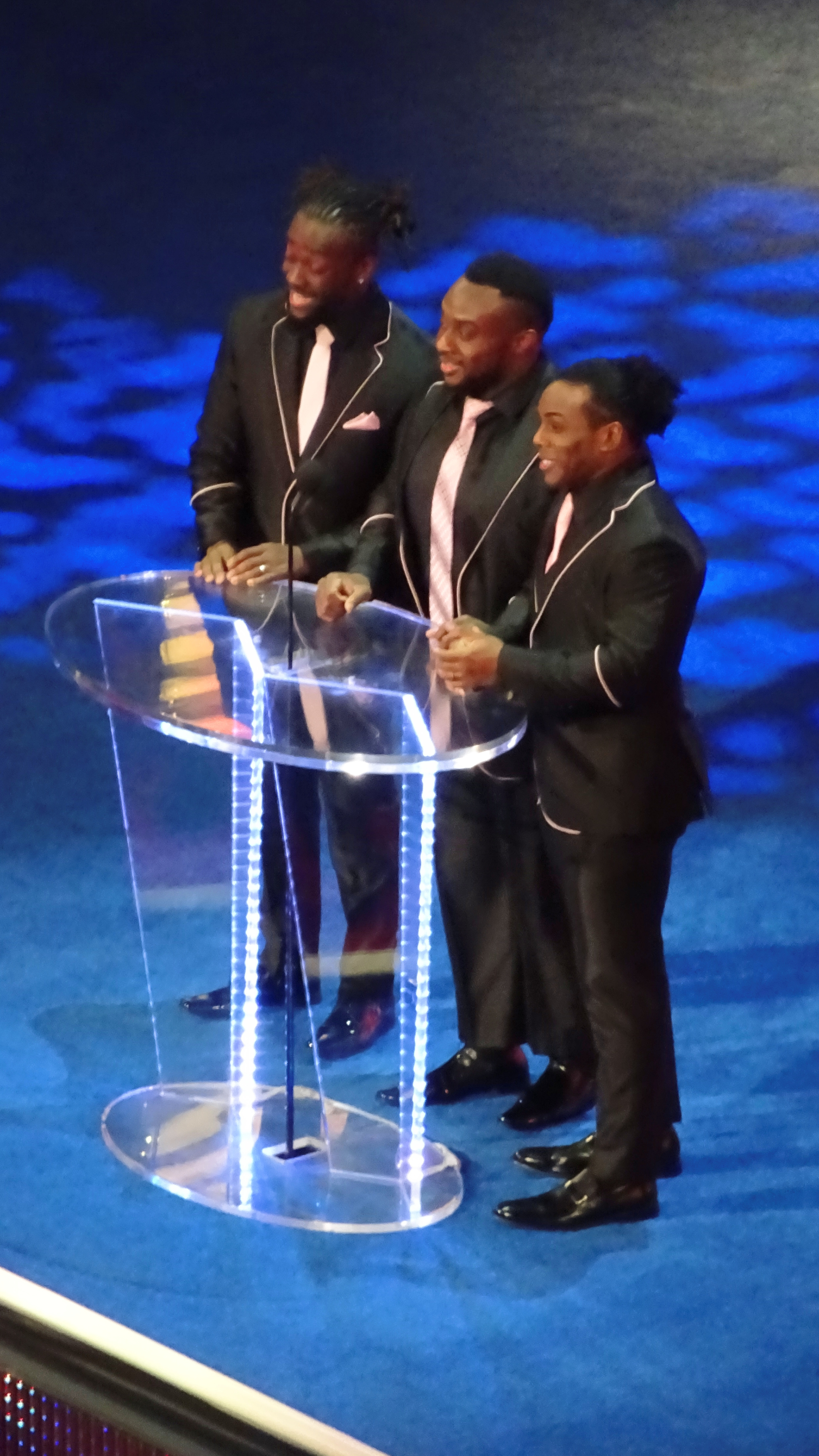
Kingston, Big E, and Woods inducting The Fabulous Freebirds into the WWE Hall of Fame in April 2016

At Fastlane on February 21, The New Day began mocking The League of Nations (Sheamus, Alberto Del Rio, Rusev, and King Barrett), calling them the "League of Booty". They then continued to mock The League of Nations in various segments and skits while simultaneously feuding with other teams and turning into fan favorites in the process. The New Day then retained their title at Roadblock against Sheamus and Barrett on March 12 and the following night on Raw against Del Rio and Rusev, but were attacked by the entire League of Nations afterwards. This led to a non-title six-man tag team match between the two stables at WrestleMania 32 on April 3, where The New Day lost, but Big E and Kingston retained their championship once again against Sheamus and Barrett the following night on Raw. At Payback on May 1, the final match of the tournament to determine the number one contenders for the WWE Tag Team Championship between Enzo Amore and Colin Cassady and The Vaudevillains (Aiden English and Simon Gotch) ended in a no contest after Amore suffered a legitimate concussion during the match. As a result, The New Day faced The Vaudevillains for the WWE Tag Team Championship at Extreme Rules on May 22, where they retained their championship after Kingston interfered. On the May 30 episode of Raw, The New Day defeated The Vaudevillains in a non-title match via disqualification after they were attacked by Luke Gallows and Karl Anderson, sparking a feud between them. At Money in the Bank on June 19, The New Day defeated Gallows and Anderson, The Vaudevillains, and Enzo and Cass in a fatal-four-way match to retain the WWE Tag Team Championship and, as of that victory, they hold the record for the longest combined reign as a tag team. On the June 20 episode of Raw, The New Day confronted returning Wyatt Family (Bray Wyatt, Erick Rowan, and Braun Strowman) and interrupted Wyatt's promo, thus starting a feud between the two teams that would lead to a non-title six-man tag team match at Battleground on July 24, where they would lose.

During the 2016 WWE draft, The New Day were drafted to the Raw brand, making the WWE Tag Team Championship exclusive to the brand. In parallel to a lengthy feud with Gallows and Anderson over the title, The New Day became the longest-reigning WWE Tag Team Champions in the title's history, breaking the old record of 331 days previously set by Paul London and Brian Kendrick and, after the creation of the SmackDown Tag Team Championship for the SmackDown brand, became the last people to have held their championship as the sole tag team title in WWE and the first to hold it under its new name of Raw Tag Team Championship. The New Day would continue to retain their championship against Gallows and Anderson in the following months, such as SummerSlam on August 21, Clash of Champions on September 25 and the following night on Raw, ending their feud in the process.

After their feud with Gallows and Anderson, The New Day began feuding with Cesaro and Sheamus and at Hell in a Cell on October 30, The New Day were defeated by Cesaro and Sheamus via disqualification, but they retained the title as a result. On the October 31 episode of Raw, The New Day revealed that they were made captain of Team Raw for the 10-on-10 Survivor Series Tag Team Elimination match at Survivor Series. At the event on November 20, they made the first elimination, but were then eliminated themselves by The Usos. However, Team Raw still won the match thanks to Cesaro and Sheamus. On the two following Raw episodes, The New Day retained their title against Cesaro and Sheamus and then Gallows and Anderson, respectively.

On the December 12 episode of Raw, after successfully defending their title in two successive triple threat tag team matches – first against Cesaro and Sheamus and Gallows and Anderson, and then against the team of Chris Jericho and WWE Universal Champion Kevin Owens, and the team of Seth Rollins and United States Champion Roman Reigns – The New Day broke Demolition's 28-year-old record to have the longest single-run with any tag team championship in WWE history. Demolition previously held the record with the WWF Tag Team Championship at 478 days. At Roadblock: End of the Line on December 18, The New Day's reign ended at 483 days after they lost the championship to Cesaro and Sheamus. On the December 26 episode of Raw, The New Day received a rematch, but failed to reclaim the championships.

==== SmackDown Tag Team Champions (2017–2019) ====
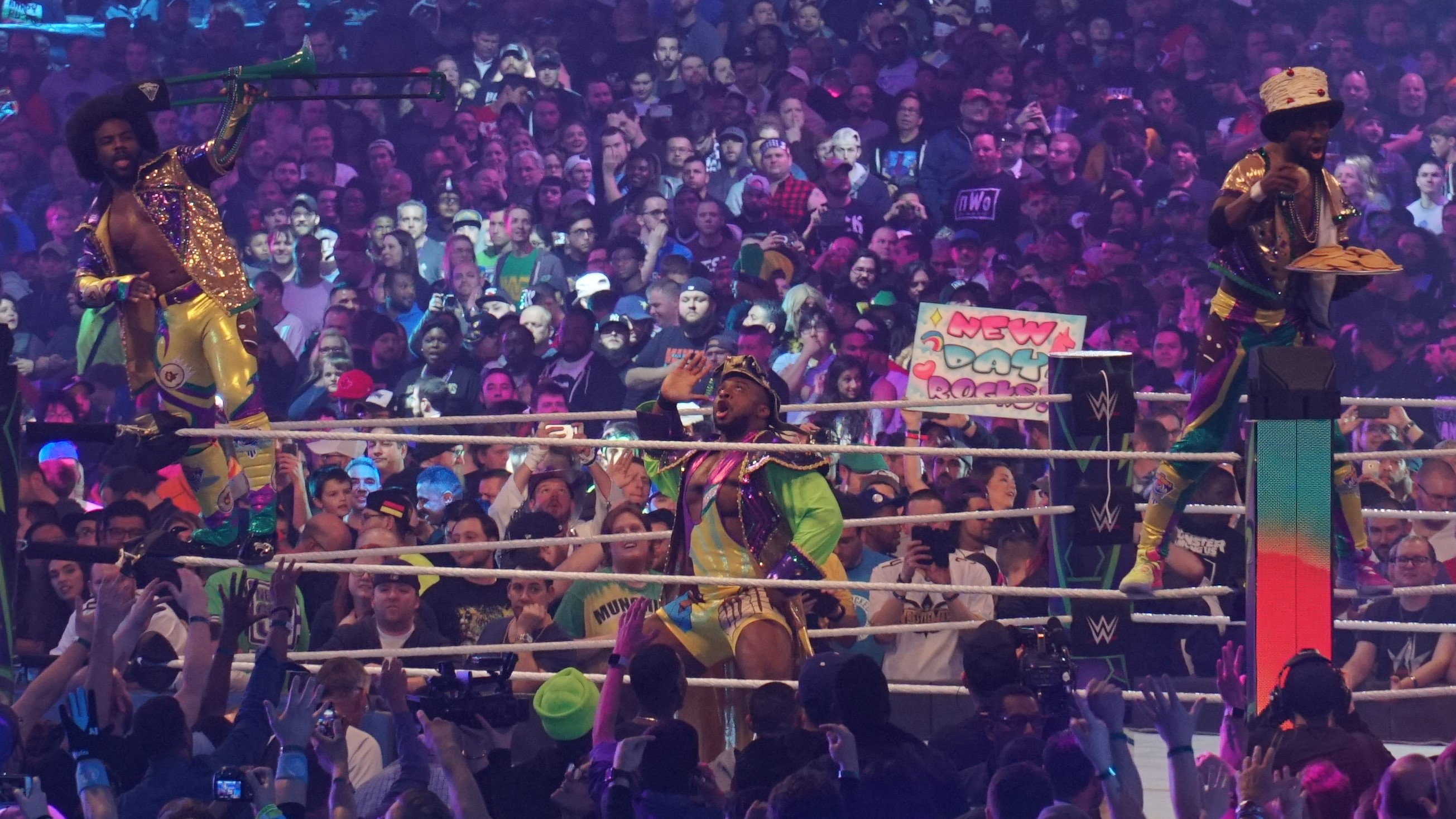
The New Day at WrestleMania 34

The New Day would go on to host WrestleMania 33, and the following night on Raw, lost to the debuting team The Revival (Scott Dawson and Dash Wilder). After the match, Kingston was attacked by The Revival, resulting in a legitimate ankle injury. On April 11, 2017, The New Day were moved to the SmackDown brand as part of Superstar Shake-up; however, they did not appear for several weeks due to Kingston's ankle injury. When The New Day returned to action, they feuded with The Usos around the SmackDown Tag Team Championship. In the two teams's first encounter at Money in the Bank, Big E and Kingston won the match by countout, but not the title. In a rematch at Battleground, Kingston and Woods captured the title. They lost the title back to The Usos on the SummerSlam 2017 pre-show, regained it on the September 12 episode of SmackDown Live in a Sin City Street Fight, and lost it again in a Hell in a Cell match at the pay-per-view of the same name.

New Day and The Usos had a triple threat match at WrestleMania 34, but were defeated by the third team, The Bludgeon Brothers. After failing to win the title at SummerSlam, The New Day defeated The Bludgeon Brothers in a No Disqualification match two days later on SmackDown to capture the title for a third time. They held the title until October 16, 2018, when they were defeated by Cesaro and Sheamus on SmackDown 1000. At TLC, The New Day would again fail to win the championship from The Bar, in a triple-threat tag team match also involving The Usos.

==== KofiMania and separation (2019–2020) ====
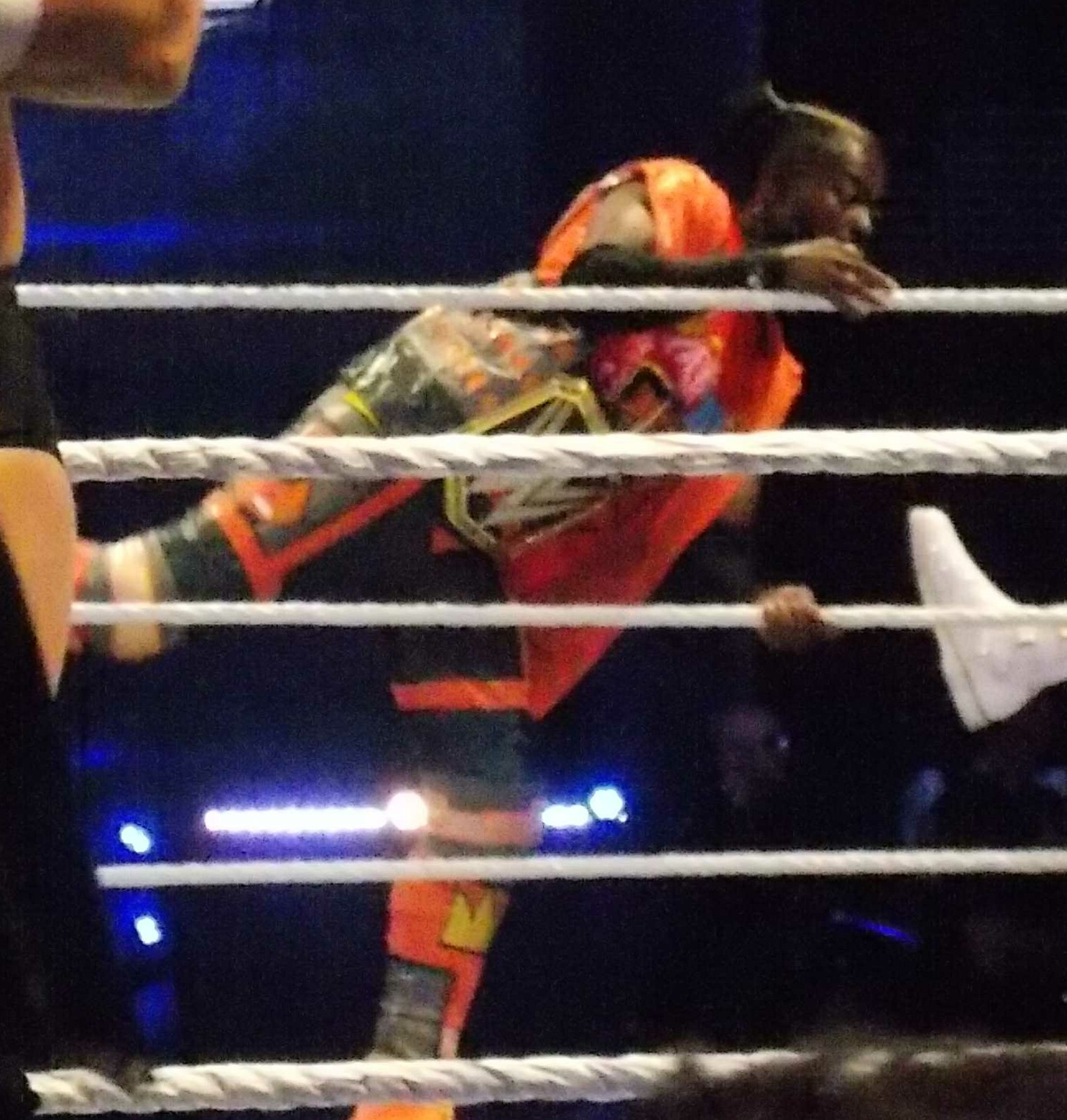
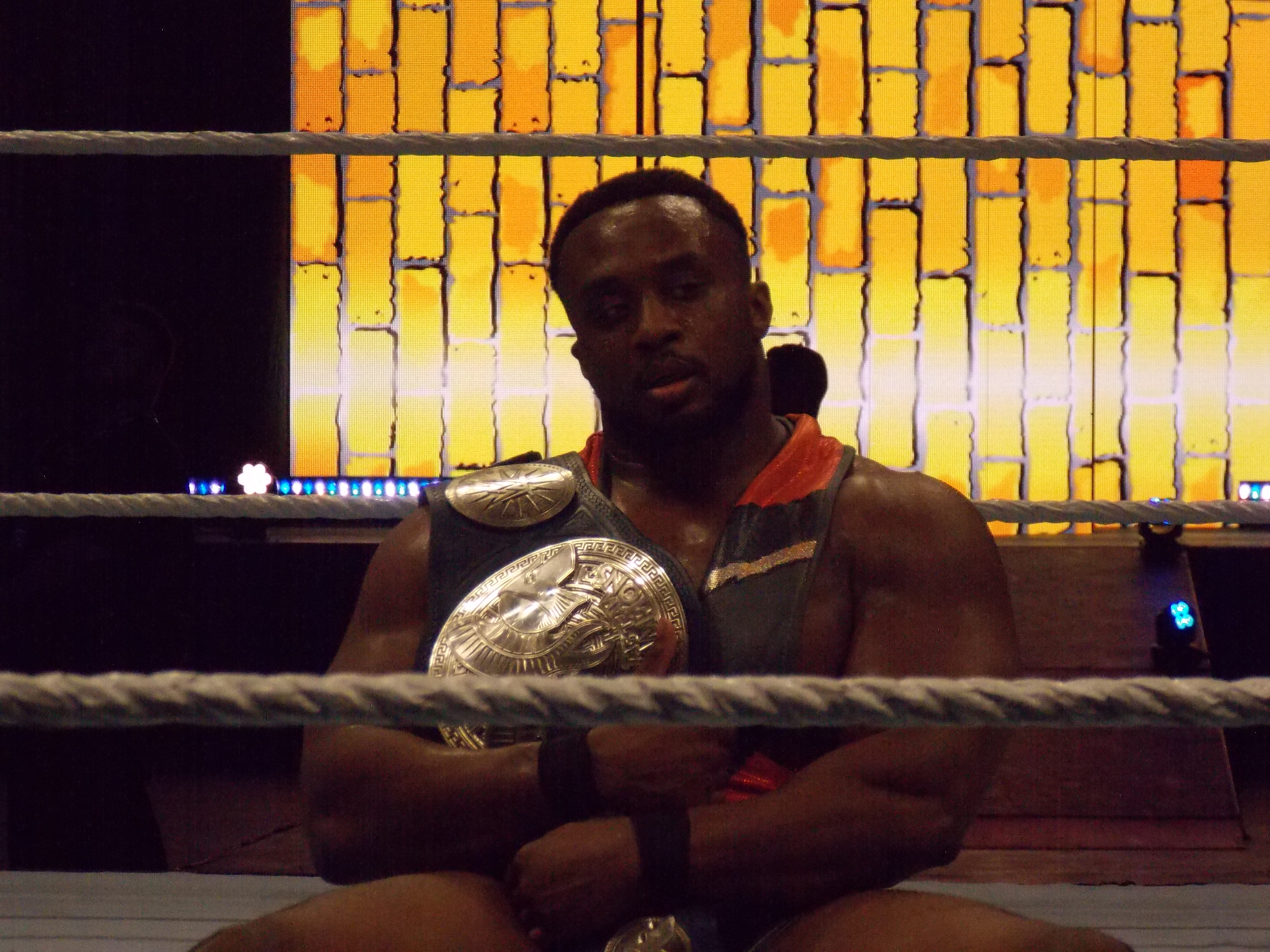
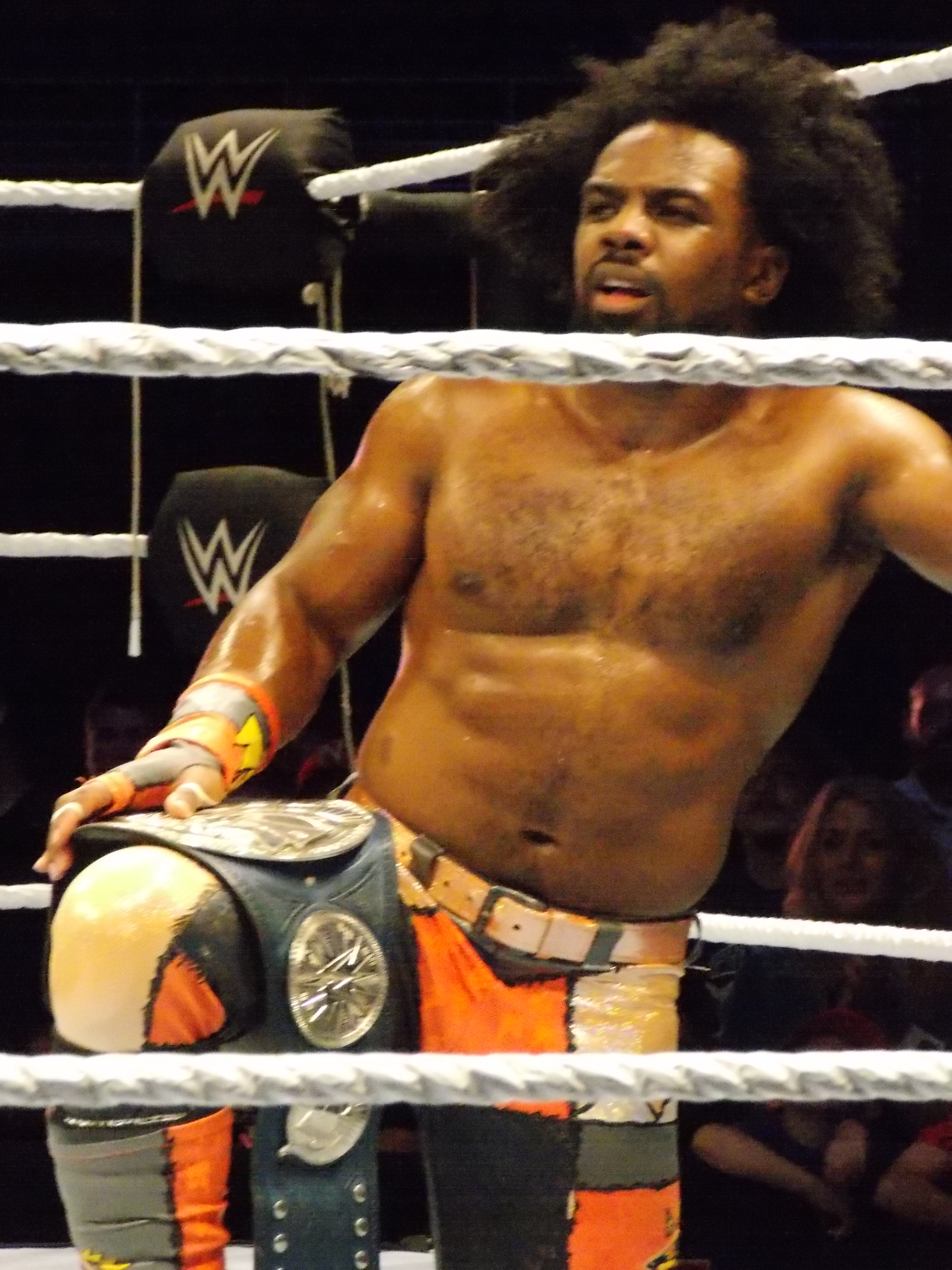
In 2019, Kingston (top) won the WWE Championship, while Big E (middle) and Woods represented the New Day as SmackDown Tag Team Champions.

During the early months of 2019, Kingston became highly popular and was pushed to a WWE Championship match at WrestleMania. After a praised participation in the Elimination Chamber match at the namesake pay-per-view, where he was defeated by the WWE Champion Daniel Bryan. He would face Bryan at WrestleMania 35, where he won the match to become the WWE Champion for the first time in his career. In doing so, he became the first African-born WWE Champion. Kingston would retain the title against Kevin Owens and Samoa Joe until he lost it against Brock Lesnar during SmackDown's 20th Anniversary on October 4. During his reign, Big E and Woods won the SmackDown Tag Team Championship, making The New Day record-tying four-time SmackDown Tag Team Champions (technically also making Kingston a double champion during this time due to the Freebird Rule). They lost the title to The Revival at Clash of Champions, but regained it two months later, becoming record five-time champions.

At TLC: Tables, Ladders & Chairs, Big E and Kingston successfully defended the title against The Revival in a ladder match. At Super ShowDown on February 27, 2020, The New Day lost the title to John Morrison and The Miz, ending their reign at 111 days. At WrestleMania 36, Kingston, who represented The New Day, failed to win the title back from Morrison, who represented himself and Miz, in a triple threat ladder match, also involving Jimmy Uso, who represented The Usos. A rematch took place on the April 17 episode of SmackDown, where Big E, who represented The New Day, won the title back from Miz, who represented himself and Morrison, in a triple threat match, also involving Jey Uso, who represented The Usos, which made The New Day six-time SmackDown Tag Team Champions. At The Horror Show at Extreme Rules, The New Day would lose the championship to Cesaro and Shinsuke Nakamura in a Tables match. On the July 24 episode of SmackDown, Kingston revealed that he would be out of action for six weeks due to a back injury. Big E would then embark on his singles run.

On the October 9 episode of SmackDown, both Kingston and Woods returned from injury and defeated Cesaro and Shinsuke Nakamura, winning their seventh SmackDown Tag Team Championship; immediately after the match, the trio were given the announcement that Kingston and Woods were being drafted to Raw as part of the 2020 Draft, while Big E remained on SmackDown, splitting the group across brands for the first time; it also marked the first time that members of The New Day would hold tag titles without all three members being champions, as Big E was not considered champion. Although this originally led to reports in the media that Big E had split from the group, the three, in addition to continuing their New Day Feel the Power podcast, also claimed that Big E would continue to be part of The New Day, albeit separately from them on SmackDown, with WWE later stating on Twitter that there was "no break-up".

==== Continuing as a duo (2020–2024) ====
Upon Kingston and Woods's Raw debut on the October 12 episode of Raw, WWE official Adam Pearce had them trade titles with Raw Tag Team Champions The Street Profits (Angelo Dawkins and Montez Ford), who had just been drafted to SmackDown, in order to keep both championships on their respective brands. This made Kingston and Woods three-time Raw Tag Team Champions, marking their first time holding the title without Big E. The New Day appeared one further time as a trio at Survivor Series on November 22 to promote their appearance in the video game Gears 5. At the event, the trio made their entrance dressed as their respective characters in the game. After the entrance and a brief in-ring promo, Big E departed backstage while Kingston and Woods faced SmackDown Tag Team Champions The Street Profits in a non-title brand supremacy match. New Day lost the match but showed mutual respect to The Street Profits. On December 20, at TLC, Kingston and Woods lost the Raw Tag Team Championship to The Hurt Business (Cedric Alexander and Shelton Benjamin).

They regained the championship on the March 15, 2021, episode of Raw, tying Cesaro and Sheamus for the most reigns as a team at four, while individually, Kingston tied Seth Rollins for the most reigns at six. They were then scheduled to defend the title against AJ Styles and Omos at WrestleMania 37, in which they lost, ending their reign at 26 days. On September 13, 2021, during Raw, Big E cashed in his Money in the Bank contract (which he had won in July) on WWE Champion Bobby Lashley, who had just retained his title against Randy Orton, to win the WWE Championship for the first time, resulting in Big E being transferred to Raw full time. As a part of the 2021 Draft, Big E was drafted to the Raw brand while Kingston and Woods were drafted to the SmackDown brand, thus splitting them again. Woods also won the King of the Ring tournament, his first individual accolade in WWE. With that victory, his ring name was briefly changed to King Woods. During that time, The New Day began to feud with The Bloodline (Roman Reigns and The Usos) for much of late 2021 and concluded the feud at Day 1 when they unsuccessfully challenged The Usos for the WWE SmackDown Tag Team Championship.

On the January 14, 2022, episode of SmackDown, Kingston announced that Woods was injured and out of action. On January 28, Big E was traded to the SmackDown brand and reunited with Kingston. In March, The New Day feuded with the team of Sheamus and Ridge Holland. A match between the teams on the March 11 episode of SmackDown saw Holland botching an overhead belly-to-belly suplex on Big E at ringside, resulting in Big E landing on the top of his head and suffering a broken neck. He also suffered fractures to his C1 vertebrae and C6 vertebrae, but no ligament or spinal cord injury. Woods would return from his own injury shortly after Big E's injury, and the trio had an onscreen reunion on May 20. However, Big E stated in an interview a month later that it was unclear if he would ever be able to wrestle again. In the same interview, he revealed that Triple H had asked him to be part of a WWE tryout for college athletes in the days leading up to that year's SummerSlam. In December, Kingston and Woods also began appearing on WWE's developmental brand, NXT, and challenged for the NXT Tag Team Championship. At NXT Deadline on December 10, they defeated Pretty Deadly (Elton Prince and Kit Wilson) to win the title for the first time and became the third WWE Tag Team Triple Crown Champions. At NXT Vengeance Day on February 4, 2023, The New Day lost the championship to Gallus (Mark Coffey and Wolfgang) in a fatal four-way tag team match, also involving Pretty Deadly and Chase University (Andre Chase and Duke Hudson), ending their reign at 56 days.

==== Final storylines (2024–2026) ====
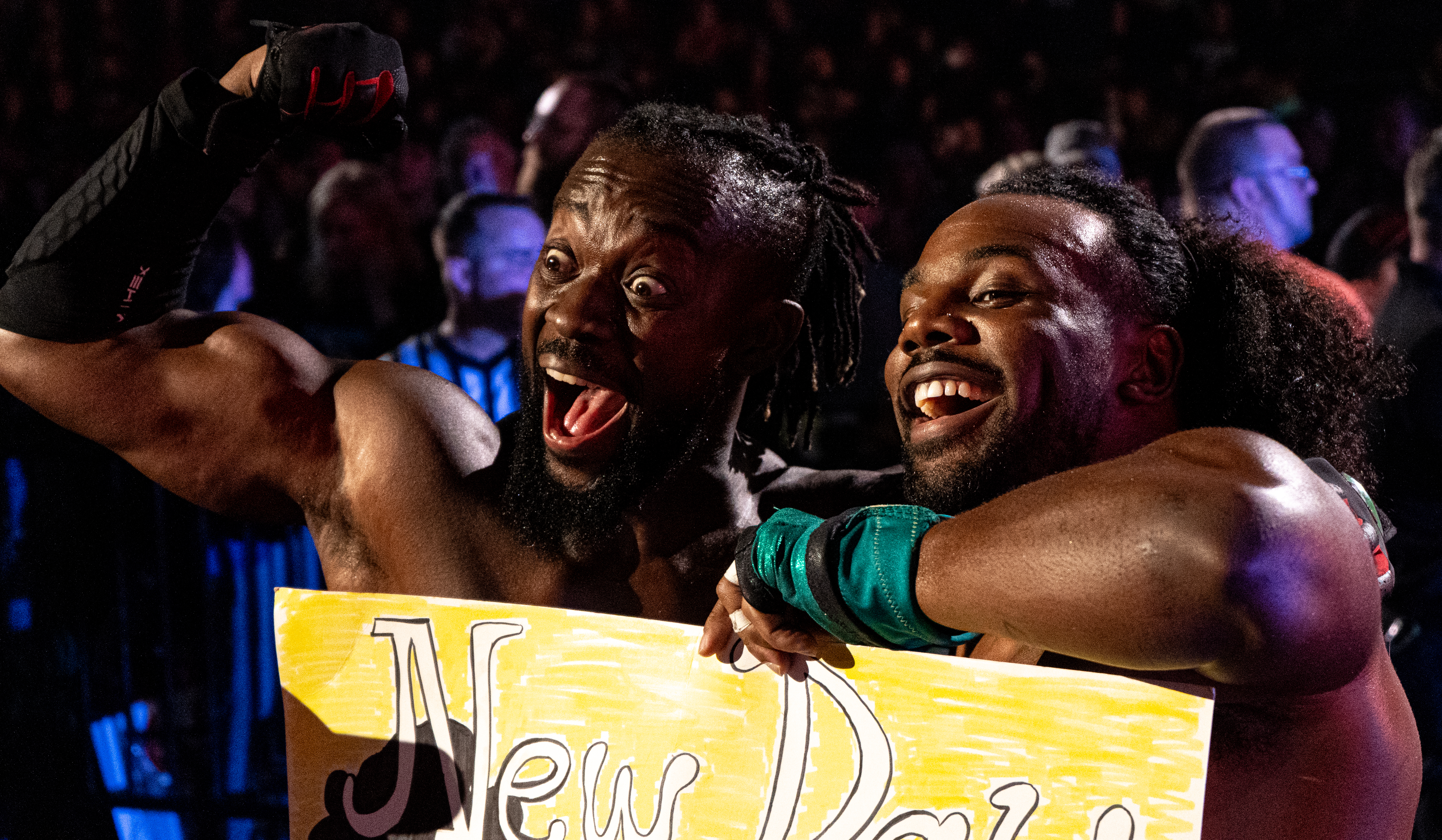
The New Day in 2024

In May 2024, Kingston and Woods began feuding with Karrion Kross and his stable The Final Testament. Kross attempted to form a wedge between the pair, claiming that Kingston was holding Woods back from having a successful singles career, leading to several on-screen and backstage bouts between the two factions. The feud concluded on the August 19 episode of Raw when The New Day and Odyssey Jones defeated The Final Testament in a six-man tag team match. Prior to this, Kingston had teased letting Jones join the stable while Woods took a stance to Jones "replacing Big E". However, Jones was suddenly released from the company on September 4 following domestic abuse allegations. On the September 16 episode of Raw, Kingston and Woods failed to win the World Tag Team Championship (formerly Raw Tag Team Championship, renamed in April) from The Judgment Day (Finn Bálor and JD McDonagh) after the referee was distracted with the remainder of The Judgment Day ("Dirty" Dominik Mysterio, Carlito and Liv Morgan) brawling with Latino World Order (LWO; Dragon Lee, Cruz Del Toro, and Joaquin Wilde) at ringside. After the match, Woods was livid that Kingston had approached LWO without being consulted, driving a bigger wedge between the two. On the November 25 episode of Raw, after losing to Alpha Academy (Otis and Akira Tozawa) and many weeks of disagreements, the pair had an extremely heated argument, attacking each other's failures in WWE.

On the December 2 episode of Raw during the 10-year anniversary celebration of The New Day‘s formation, Big E made an in-ring reunion with Kingston and Woods for the first time since his injury and announced that he would return as their manager until he was medically cleared. However, Kingston and Woods kicked him out of the stable, turning both Kingston and Woods heel for the first time since 2016 and reconciling with one another in the process. Kingston and Woods won the World Tag Team Championship, held by The War Raiders (Erik and Ivar), at WrestleMania 41, but lost it on the June 30 episode of Raw to The Judgment Day (Finn Bálor and JD McDonagh), ending their reign at 72 days. In September, Woods underwent surgery to remove a lipoma from his head. In February 2026, Woods said that he was managing a shoulder injury.

On May 2, 2026, Kingston and Woods mutually parted ways with WWE. It was later confirmed by both Woods and Kingston that they refused to take a pay-cut of more than 50% in their new contract offer and opted to be released from their deals, while Big E remained with the company in his non-wrestling roles and later confirming his in-ring retirement.

=== All Elite Wrestling (2026–present) ===
At All In on August 30, 2026, Kingston and Woods, now going by the names of Kofi and Austin Creed respectively, made their All Elite Wrestling (AEW) debuts on August 30, 2026, as The New Level and as babyfaces, entering with A$AP Ferg's song "New Level", and won the AEW World Trios Championship with Swerve Strickland in a Trios Roulette Royale. The trio then began a feud with former champions "Hangman" Adam Page and Brodido (Brody King and Bandido). They successfully defended their titles against Page and Brodido at All Out on September 26 before losing the titles back to them in a two-out-of-three falls match 1–2 at WrestleDream on October 17, ending their reign at 48 days. The trio regained the titles on November 14 at Full Gear in a Texas Death match to begin their record-tying second reign as a team.

== Characters and reception ==
=== Original gimmick ===
The original gimmick of the three, before they took on the name The New Day, was born from Woods's promo in July 2014 in which he suggested creating the stable, and stated: "You cannot move ahead by shaking hands, kissing babies, singing and dancing like a puppet. You cannot move ahead by always doing what you're told. Now, it is our time to find purpose, because we do not ask any longer. Now, we take." They were depicted as determined, strong-willed athletes with newfound motivation, describing themselves as "smart athletic friends" and establishing themselves as underrated underdogs, criticizing "the powers that be" for not giving them a fair chance; however, they were taken off television shortly after their debut.

Woods described the trio's original characters as "Three guys, who come up from kind of the same background, that just want more from life, more from their jobs, more from their friends, more from everything around them. ... So we tried to take that mentality, and get it across on TV as best as we could."

In late 2014, between their original gimmick and gospel eras, the trio, having been taken off television and having been told by WWE creative that they needed their characters to be more positive and uplifting, spent months meeting during their free time to work on new ideas, writing and filming vignettes that they would try to get Vince McMahon to watch while also communicating remotely to share more costume and gimmick ideas. They came up with a "Problem Solvers" gimmick, which Kingston described in 2015 as "a funny version of the APA, [people] would come to us with their problems and we'd solve them in, like, a comical way." According to the trio, "Everyone that saw it was like, blown away by it, they thought it was awesome, it was funny, it made sense, you could see where it would fit in on the show." However, McMahon was unenthusiastic, and the gimmick was discarded. While The New Day recognize this period as frustrating, Woods also considered it instrumental in the three of them developing chemistry and a true friendship, with Woods stating: "I don't think that [without that period] the bond would be as strong, or that the [eventual "power of positivity"] gimmick would work as well."

=== Gospel era ===
The trio debuted as The New Day in November 2014, now stereotypical black gospel preacher-like characters. In an out-of-character interview in August 2015, The New Day called their gospel era "the complete opposite of what we wanted to do", and claimed that the gimmick had been created by then-WWE CEO Vince McMahon himself, who summoned the trio to his office and announced that he had designed their new characters, stating: "It's taken me a long time to come up with this, but I think I got it: I want you guys to be preachers." The trio added: "We didn't want to sing and dance, because for African-American athletes, you're either singing and dancing, or you're the big strong black guy, or the foreign black guy. Those are the three archetypes. [We wanted] to push some sort of message for all kids, but more specifically for young, black kids watching wrestling: you can be whatever kind of character you want, you come with a blank slate and you can be anything, not just [black stereotypes.] We can't describe to you the tension [in the room when he gave us the characters]. We're all like, smiling and nodding and all of us were thinking the same thing: 'Oh my God, this man is crazy.'"

The trio claim that they were given an "awful" list of team names to choose from, which included "Fresh Coat of Paint", HOPE (standing for "House of Positive Energy"), "A House of Light", and "KBX" (for "Kingston, Big, Xavier"). Kingston called the entrance theme they were originally offered "the worst gospel [song]", with Big E stating "It felt very old-timey, it felt like it was recorded in the '40s." The three gave WWE officials modern gospel music to suggest something more modern, resulting in the theme song eventually used by the group.

Those characters received negative reactions from fans and critics alike. Jim Ross noted that "today's wrestling fan may be a little hard on the talented trio" due to them "espousing such positivity". ProWrestling.net wrote that The New Day "seem to be all about smiling and dancing; one of the three racial stereotypes WWE assigns to their African-American performers". Entertainment website The A.V. Club called the gimmick "racist" because "they figuratively pantomime shooting dice when they get into the ring". Vice stated "Months after rejecting the stereotypical roles bestowed on black wrestlers [during Woods's original July 2014 promo], Woods, Kingston, and Big E found themselves saddled with a new one"; they pointed out that both Kingston and Woods had already been given stereotypical characters, with Kingston previously portraying "an all-smiles, erstwhile Jamaican babyface" even though he was from Ghana, while Woods was given a "funk-dancing gimmick" character.

While two members of The New Day would wrestle, the one acting as their manager would regularly clap into his hands or slam his hands into the mat following a three-clap pattern, inviting the audience to follow suit; the idea originated from Woods, who felt that they needed a unique clap to differentiate themselves. Although fans were somewhat enthusiastic to the clapping during the first months, and on the March 30, 2015 episode of Raw (the day after WrestleMania 31), the audience, while clapping, loudly chanted "New Day sucks!" in rhythm with the clapping, and, when the three would chant "New Day!" loudly as part of their gimmick, the live audiences would scream "sucks!" in response, otherwise heavily booing the trio; similar reactions occurred during the following weeks, until the group turned heel.

The New Day claimed that they immediately knew that the gimmick would never go over, and that a heel-turn was needed, with Woods stating: "When we were given the gimmick and saw what it was, we figured, if we throw everything that we can—smiling, clapping, happiness, everything—into this babyface gimmick, it will not take long to turn heel. And it's pretty much what happened." The three asked to be turned heel for months, but it was only approved after fans reactions got more hostile in the wake of WrestleMania 31 that WWE agreed; according to the trio, McMahon had remained convinced up until that point that the gimmick would be very popular with the fans.

=== "Power of positivity" ===
After the largely negative reception to the gospel version of The New Day, the characters became heels in the wake of WrestleMania 31. The characters first transitioned into an "oblivious bad guys" satire version of their previous gimmick, overly joyous and seemingly unaware of the booing from the fans; they would also start cheating during their matches, but claim that they were justified in doing so. Additionally, the trio became fanatically obsessed with the "power of positivity", which they would try to preach to their audiences. They would occasionally tease self-awareness, with Woods claiming during a promo: "We gotta smile, we gotta keep positive, because if not, the rage comes out. And if the rage comes out, everybody on the roster goes to the hospital", and Big E adding "We clap, or we snap."

In the months following their heel turn, The New Day transitioned away from the gospel aspect, developing their own unique identity and focusing on their new "Power of positivity" gimmick. They also began using New Day props, such as Woods's trombone, which he brought to the ring and played during the group's entrance and matches, later naming the trombone Francesca; after "she" was destroyed by Chris Jericho, Woods replaced her with her "sister" Francesca II in January 2016; he also introduced her "Scottish cousin" Agnes (bagpipes) at a show in Scotland in November 2016. Following Francesca II's destruction, she was replaced by Francesca II: Turbo, a nod to Street Fighter II: Turbo. Also in late 2015, a unicorn pony was incorporated into The New Day's newest shirt, and the trio began making unicorn gestures, using their fingers as horns and even having interviewers claiming to perceive them having "unicorn magic". The group eventually began wearing plastic unicorn horns during their ring entrance, and using a team signature move named Unicorn Stampede; this was based on Woods being a fan of My Little Pony: Friendship is Magic. Also in 2015, The New Day began using the word "booty" as their catchphrase and began occasionally using it to tease other wrestlers and the host city where WWE events would take place, such as calling Birmingham "Bootyham". The trio became heavily promo-oriented, and would usually cut promos while on their way to the ring (instead of a regular entrance where their theme would play instead).

In stark contrast to the gospel-based version of The New Day, their "Power of positivity" version received an overwhelmingly positive reception from fans and critics and had a series of strong in-ring performances and promos. Although they were heels, the crowds would now start chanting "New Day rocks!" as the group had encouraged them to do as babyfaces, instead of "New Day sucks!" Kenny Herzog of Rolling Stone named the group WWE's "Wrestlers of the Year" for 2015, describing them as "a hat-trick of pro-wrestling awesomeness", having "transformed from preachy dreck to a source of constant entertainment". In early 2016, Aaron Oster of The Baltimore Sun described them as "the most entertaining wrestling act of the past few years". Former WWE Champion CM Punk, who had been estranged from WWE during this period and retired altogether before his eventual 2021 debut in All Elite Wrestling and 2023 return to WWE, praised The New Day for getting over on their own, and claimed that although he no longer watched WWE-based product, and had also lost his passion for wrestling overall, he would still watch The New Day's segments. At the end of 2015, the group won Pro Wrestling Illustrateds award for Tag Team of the Year, and the Wrestling Observer Newsletter's award for Best Gimmick. Rolling Stone named The New Day collectively as the WWE Wrestler of the Year, stating that "what New Day's three talents accomplished together in 2015 represented – appropriately enough – a hat-trick of pro-wrestling awesomeness: pulling themselves out from creative quicksand, standing alone as the elite among their peers and daring us not to tune in no matter what the win–loss implications."

Some commentators believed that the group's popularity was detrimental to their efficiency as heels, with both Jim Ross and Jason Powell from ProWrestling.net suggesting that The New Day should be trying to gain "heel heat" as opposed to being comedic, and in January 2016, following the Royal Rumble, James Caldwell of PWtorch noted that the group's babyface opponents came out "mainly to boos since New Day was too entertaining", adding that the group "don't act overly-heelish to get heat. So, their opponents continue to suffer opposite New Day".

=== Fan favorites ===
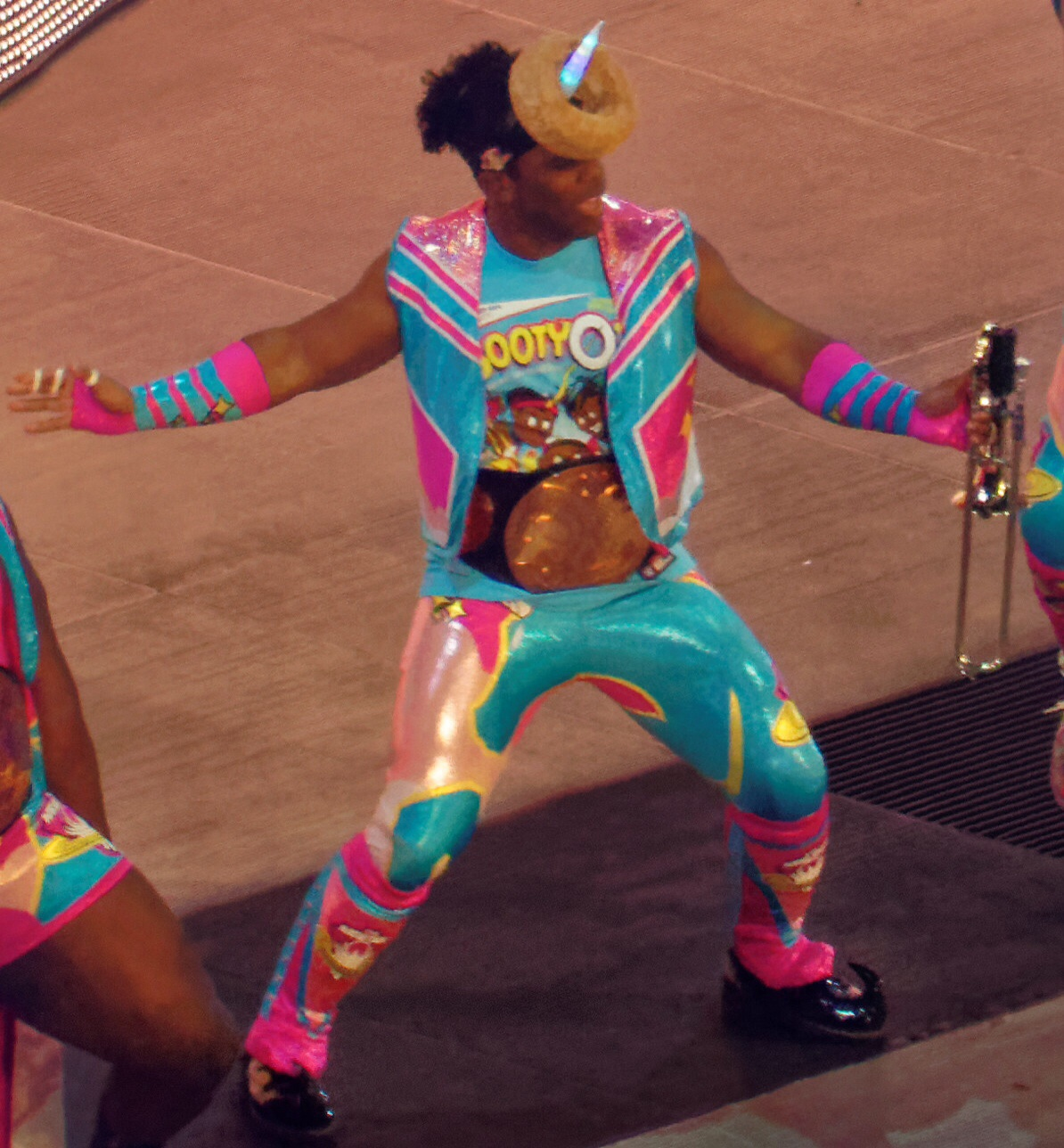
Xavier Woods' trombone "Francesca", "Booty-O's" cereal, and unicorn horns (all three appearing here on Woods) are an integral part of The New Day's gimmick.

The trio's popularity led to them reverting to babyfaces in early 2016 when they began feuding with the League of Nations. Unlike the stable's previous babyface run, this version, which retained the gimmick of their heel version without the cheating and aggressive attitude, proved successful and popular with fans, and similarly won Pro Wrestling Illustrated's award for Tag Team of the Year for 2016. In September 2017, Bleacher Report claimed that "there should not be any doubt that New Day has earned its spot among WWE's all-time greatest tag teams ... They won over the audience with their eccentric antics and became one of the most entertaining acts WWE had seen in years. Not only have they brought tag team wrestling into the mainstream with their immense popularity, they have had their fair share of exceptional matches as well." The same year, GQ stated: "In three short years, the New Day has become the bridge between two formerly isolated worlds. They are the purveyors of positivity in a year that sorely needs it. They are perhaps the most enlightened entertainers to ever step foot [sic] in a wrestling ring."

The New Day's promos would often contain a number of references to pop culture or recent events in the world; Woods stated that "Nine times out of ten, the stuff we're saying in our promos is just stuff that we say in the car to each other. Whatever is popping us in the car that weekend, we reference that. ... Rather than trying to hit the masses with what we were saying, we were hitting a little pocket every week because we're very into the grassroots type of thing." Those would sometimes tackle controversial subjects, such as the Russian interference in the 2016 United States elections, or the longstanding race issues within WWE.

The New Day's 2017-2018 feud with The Usos over the SmackDown Tag Team Championship was acclaimed by both critics and fans, with Bleacher Report crediting it for "[helping] elevate tag team wrestling in WWE to heights that hadn't been reached in years through its stellar series of matches on pay-per-view and on SmackDown Live." Despite praising "the Match of the Year-quality encounters the tandems were having at every pay-per-view on which they appeared", they also worried that the SmackDown creative team had also become overly reliant on the two and was dismissing all other teams.

In 2016, The New Day introduced their "Booty-O's" cereal, claiming that "They make sure you ain't booty". At WrestleMania 32, the team emerged from a giant "Booty-O's" box wearing Dragon Ball Z-inspired armor (inherited from Woods's earlier gimmick). Later "Booty-O's" shirts became a successful article of merchandise. In early 2018, they replaced "Booty-O's" cereals with pancakes, passing it to members of the audience, throwing it to their enemies or eating it. Woods claimed the idea came from discussing the idea of a lumberjack match: "I said, 'Well, if I'm a lumberjack, what do they eat? They eat flapjacks.' It was hilarious. So, we said the next week, 'Are we going to do pancakes? Yeah, sure. Why not?' And that's where the pancakes came from." They were also the official hosts of WrestleMania 33.

=== Black Lives Matter support ===
On the 12 June 2020 episode of Friday Night SmackDown, Big E and Kingston (acting as a duo because Woods was injured), then SmackDown Tag Team Champions, both took a knee and raised a fist in the air, in homage to George Floyd, whose murder the previous month had raised worldwide protests against racial injustice; they also wore armbands not usually part of their wrestling attires, on which were written names of other individuals whose deaths were due to racial injustice: Shukri Abdi on Big E's, and Tamla Horsford and Breonna Taylor on Kingston's. The gesture was praised within the wrestling community and by media outlets, with Sports Illustrated calling it "a pivotal moment", Essentially Sports calling it "a huge statement" and Forbes stated: "With WWE the only live event promotion that has remained intact throughout the pandemic, the powerful message by Kofi Kingston and Big E figure to be part of a new normal once American sports are reopened as the current climate now demands more action to be taken in the still-harrowing fight against racial injustice." Big E stated the following August that the moment "was important to us", stating: "It was something that really weighed on us, and we felt like we really needed to make a statement. [...] We want to work toward a better world, a better society, and it's been really heartwarming to see the amount of support for that. We want to continue to have a positive impact on our world and be worthy of people's fandom." Three days prior to Big E and Kingston's kneeling on SmackDown, the two and Woods opened up about their personal experiences with racism and their thoughts on Floyd's murder on The New Day's podcast Feel the Power.

== Other media ==
The New Day wrote their first book titled The Book of Booty: Shake It. Love It. Never Be It. The New Day also had a cameo role in the 2016 WWE Studios film Countdown. Although all three of them had previously been featured in official WWE video games, the members of The New Day were featured as squadmates for the first time in the video game WWE 2K16, and have further appeared as a team in WWE 2K17, WWE 2K18, WWE 2K19, WWE 2K20, WWE 2K22, WWE 2K23, WWE 2K24, WWE 2K25 and WWE 2K26. In 2017, The New Day also made an appearance on the TruTV comedy series Adam Ruins Everything.

Corey Graves announced on his podcast WWE After the Bell that The New Day would launch their own new podcast (produced by WWE and Endeavor Audio) titled The New Day: Feel the Power, which premiered on December 2, 2019 and ceased in late 2023. In November 2020, all three members of The New Day were added as playable DLC characters in the video game Gears 5, sporting custom armor in the colors of The New Day's ring attires; the three recorded dialogue specifically for the game. As promotion for this DLC at WWE's Survivor Series pay-per-view that same month, the trio appeared in their Gears 5 armor. In October 2021, Netflix released the interactive title Escape The Undertaker featuring The Undertaker and The New Day. The viewer chooses which path Kingston, Woods, and Big E go on and ultimately decides whether or not they leave with their souls intact.

=== Film ===
Year	Title	Role	Notes
2021	Escape the Undertaker	Themselves	

== Championships and accomplishments ==
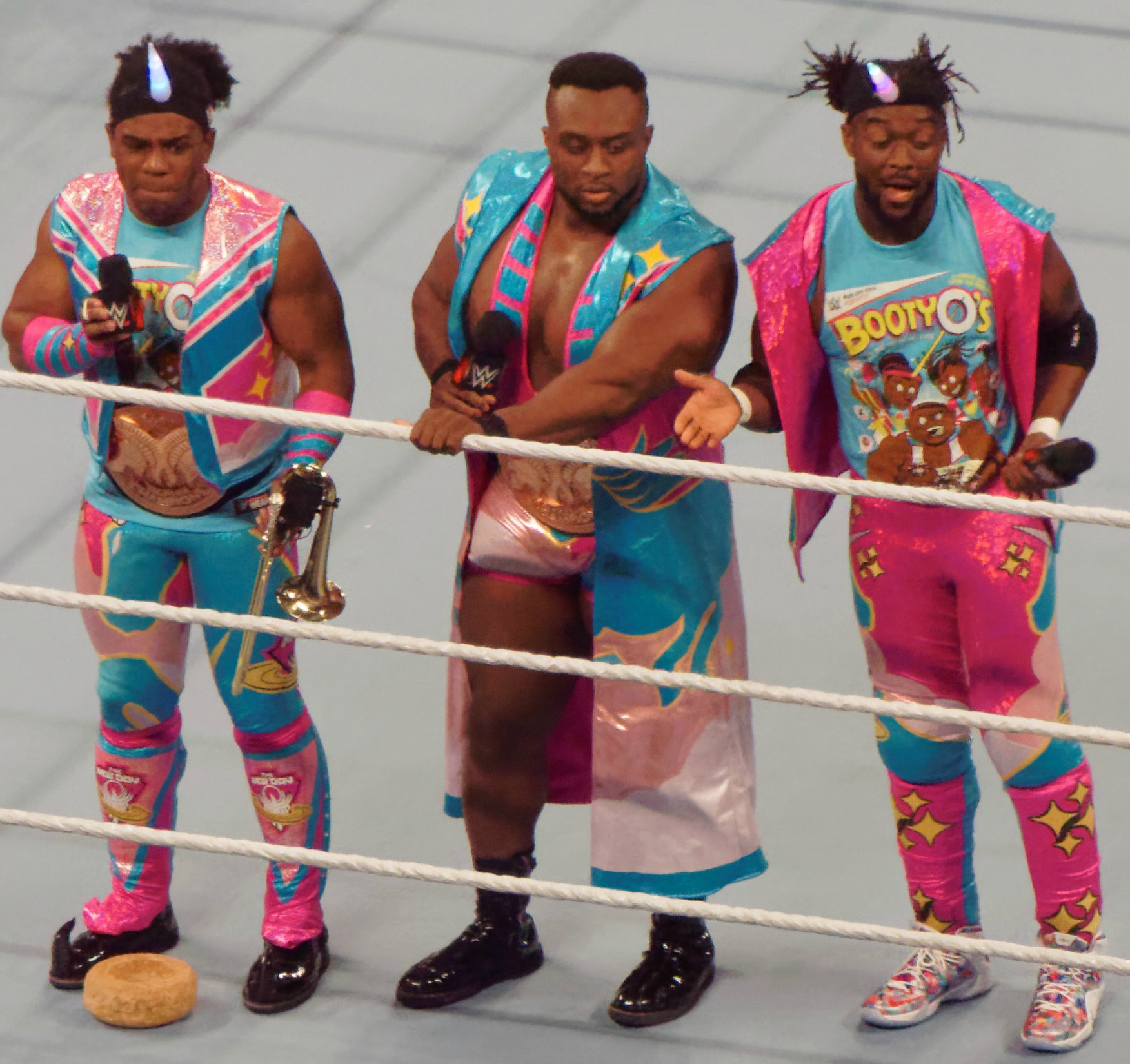
The New Day are five-time and longest-reigning World Tag Team Champions at 483 days for their second reign, as well as having the longest combined reign at 699 days; during their first two reigns, Big E, Kofi Kingston, and Xavier Woods were all recognized as champion under the Freebird Rule.

- All Elite Wrestling
  - AEW World Trios Championship (2 times, current) – Creed and Kofi with Swerve Strickland
- CBS Sports
  - Best Moment/Angle of the Year (2019) – Kingston (winning the WWE Championship at WrestleMania 35)
- Pro Wrestling Illustrated
  - Tag Team of the Year (2015, 2016)
  - Ranked No. 8 of PWI Tag Team 50 in 2020
- Rolling Stone
  - WWE Wrestlers of the Year (2015)
- Wrestling Observer Newsletter
  - Best Gimmick (2015)
- WWE
  - WWE Championship (2 times) – Kingston (1) and Big E (1)
  - World Tag Team Championship (Note: During their first reign, the championship was called the WWE Tag Team Championship, but midway through their second reign, it was renamed to Raw Tag Team Championship following the 2016 brand split. This made New Day the first team to hold the title under its second name (due to the Chris Benoit double-murder and suicide, WWE often starts with New Day's second reign when speaking of previous teams who held the championship (as Raw Tag and now World Tag) although the official title history on their website shows the entire lineage beginning with the inaugural reign of Chris Benoit and Kurt Angle but with no match description, as is the case for all titles Benoit held in WWE). During their fifth reign, it was called the World Tag Team Championship as it was renamed in April 2024 to remove the brand names from the titles (conversely, the SmackDown Tag Team Championship became the WWE Tag Team Championship). Prior to October 2020, all three members of New Day were recognized as champions under the Freebird Rule.) (5 times) (Note: During their first two reigns, Big E, Kofi Kingston, and Xavier Woods were all recognized as champions under the Freebird rule; however, only Kingston and Woods are recognized as champion after October 2020, as during the 2020 WWE Draft, Kingston and Woods were drafted to Raw while Big E remained on SmackDown, splitting Big E from the team.) – Big E, Kingston, and Woods (2), and Kingston and Woods (3)
  - WWE SmackDown Tag Team Championship (7 times) (Note: During their first six reigns, Big E, Kofi Kingston, and Xavier Woods were all recognized as champions under the Freebird rule; however, only Kingston and Woods were recognized as champion for the seventh reign as after Kingston and Woods won their seventh title, they were drafted to Raw while Big E remained on SmackDown, splitting Big E from the team.) Big E, Kingston, and Woods (6), and Kingston and Woods (1)
  - NXT Tag Team Championship (1 time) – Kingston and Woods
  - King of the Ring (2021) – Woods
  - Money in the Bank (2021) – Big E
  - 13th Grand Slam Champion (under current format; 20th overall) – Kingston
  - Triple Crown Champion (traditional format) – Kingston (30th), Big E (33rd)
  - Tag Team Triple Crown Champions – Kingston and Woods (Third)
  - WWE SmackDown Tag Team Championship Tournament (2018)
  - WWE Speed Championship #1 Contender Tournament (2024) – Woods
  - Match of the Year (2019) – Kingston (vs. Daniel Bryan at WrestleMania 35)
  - WWE Year-End Awards (2 times)
    - Men's Tag Team of the Year (2019)
    - Moment of the Year (2019) – Kingston (winning the WWE Championship at WrestleMania 35)
  - Slammy Award (1 time)
    - Ring Gear of the Year (2020)
