= Death of Christopher Kapessa =

2019 drowning in Wales

Christopher Kapessa (6 January 2006 – 1 July 2019) was a Welsh boy who died at the age of 13 in the River Cynon on 1 July 2019. He was pushed from a height of 2.5 metres into the water and declared dead on the same day.

According to Kapessa's family and their representatives, the police investigation into the incident lasted around two days, the event declared "an accident" within 24 hours. A fortnight later, the anti-racist charity The Monitoring Group submitted a complaint to South Wales Police on behalf of Kapessa's mother Alina Joseph, alleging racial discrimination in the police response. In February 2020, the Crown Prosecution Service (CPS) reported that there was "sufficient evidence" but not "public interest" for a manslaughter case against a child suspected to have pushed Kapessa into the river. A 2024 inquest found that it was a "dangerous prank" that caused Kapessa's death, but that the child who pushed him did not intend to kill him. The coroner found no evidence that the death was caused by racism.

Joseph has criticised the South Wales Police as "institutionally racist" and rejected the conclusions of the 2024 inquest. The local community in Wales and internet crowdfunding have provided money to the family, which supports their legal fees. In June 2020, the subject received attention as part of the Black Lives Matter movement.

== Background ==
According to The Times, Kapessa's mother Alina Joseph was born in the Congo and moved to the UK in the 1990s. Born on 16 January 2006, Christopher Kapessa had six siblings and was raised by his single mother, who worked as a bus driver. Kapessa was born in London, with the family moving to Wales in 2011. Joseph reported that the family had been called "the only blacks in the village" in Wales and were subject to racist bullying and harassment, one incident leaving Christopher alone "in a pool of his own blood". Their home was vandalised with graffiti and in May 2018 they moved from Hirwaun, Wales, after a fire at the house. At the time of his death, Christopher Kapessa attended Mountain Ash Comprehensive School. He was a member of the local Mountain Ash junior football team and also enjoyed dancing.

== Death ==
Aged 13, Christopher Kapessa died on 1 July 2019 in the River Cynon in Fernhill, Rhondda Cynon Taf, Wales. On the day of his death, Kapessa had told Joseph he was going to play football with his friends after school. Around ten children were present at the scene of his death. A boy, aged 14, pushed Kapessa from a height of 2.5 metres into the water after asking, "shall I push him in?" Kapessa was unable to swim. A coroner reported that Kapessa likely experienced cold water shock and ingestion of water. Children, including the one who pushed him, jumped in and attempted to rescue him.

Alina Joseph was informed that he had "jumped off a bridge" around 5 p.m. by a sports coach. Emergency services were notified of the incident around 5:40 p.m. A South Wales Police search team, firefighters, paramedics and a helicopter were dispatched; Kapessa's body was recovered from the river and he was pronounced dead at the scene.

The Crown Prosecution Service (CPS) concluded that Kapessa was pushed into the river in an action that was "not in an effort to harm someone". The CPS said that the suspect was aged 14 at the time of the incident, had a "good school record" and had never previously come to the attention of the police. The suspect has been reported to be white and male.

== Police investigations ==
According to the director of the anti-racist charity The Monitoring Group, police ruled the incident "an accident" within 24 hours. The family claimed that the investigation had stopped around a day after the incident was declared an accident, by which time four of the 14 people present at the scene had been contacted by police. Joseph reported that on multiple occasions, police presented her with glasses that did not belong to her son and tried to convince her that they did.

On 17 July 2019, The Monitoring Group filed a complaint to South Wales Police on behalf of Joseph, alleging racial discrimination in the police's treatment of the incident. Joseph later said that the police were "insensitive" and had been "unable to answer many of the most basic of our questions". Joseph was also in contact with Race Alliance Wales, who urged a "full investigation" into both the death of Kapessa and the police conduct in response to the incident.

It was reported on 26 July 2019 that, according to Hilary Brown of Race Alliance Wales, the investigation was pursuing possible manslaughter. Chief superintendent Dorian Lloyd said that the investigation had now been passed to "the major crime investigation team". A teenage boy was reported to be in cooperation with the police over their inquiries. The police said that a family liaison officer was in contact with Kapessa's family. By February 2020, the team had taken 170 statements and conducted 54 child interviews.

In February 2020, the Crown Prosecution Service commented that there was "sufficient evidence" for a manslaughter prosecution case. However, they reported that no such case would go ahead as there was not "public interest" for it. The family's lawyer called the response "disappointing" but said that "we are not looking for retribution". Joseph criticised the response and called the South Wales Police "institutionally racist".

Joseph took legal action against the Director of Public Prosecutions for the failure to prosecute the boy who allegedly pushed Christopher Kapessa into the river. Her application for judicial review was heard in court on 13 January 2022. The High Court upheld the original decision, with Lord Justice Popplewell saying in the decision that "the factors militating against a prosecution in this case outweigh the factors in favour of a prosecution".

The Independent Office for Police Conduct (IOPC) upheld one complaint against the South Wales Police, calling an officer's behaviour "ill-judged and insensitive" during a meeting with Kapessa's family. According to the IOPC, the officer needed to undergo additional training but would not face disciplinary action.

== Inquest ==
In January 2024, an inquest found that Kapessa died from a "dangerous prank"—he was deliberately pushed by a child who did not intend to cause his death. It concluded that there was no evidence Kapessa's death was motivated by racism. Joseph rejected "prank" as an appropriate descriptor. She said that, as it was clear Kapessa was pushed deliberately, the CPS should review the decision not to prosecute the suspect.

== Public reaction ==
In July 2019, the local community raised in excess of £9,000 to go to Kapessa's family across various fundraisers, according to WalesOnline. By February 2020, Kapessa's family had launched a crowdfunding campaign to pay for their legal fees. A petition calling for further investigation into the cases of Kapessa's death and the death of Shukri Abdi had reached 5,000 signatures by March 2020.

Organisations who have expressed concern over the police handling of case include Racism Alliance Wales, Cardiff Stand Up To Racism, Women Connect First and Black Association of Women Stepping Out. In June 2020, campaigners in the Black Lives Matter movement compared the police handling of the case to that of the murder of Stephen Lawrence in 1993. Kapessa's mother said that members of the movement had made her feel "like you have the world behind you".

== See also ==
- Death of Ricky Reel
