= The Monitoring Group =

Anti-racist charity in the United Kingdom

The Monitoring Group (TMG) is an anti-racist charity in the UK. It was established in Southall in the early 1980s, and originally known as the Southall Monitoring Group. Its director is Suresh Grover.

== History ==
Meetings to establish the Southall Monitoring group began in December 1981, after the racist murder of Gurdip Singh Chaggar in 1976, the police killing of Blair Peach in 1979, and confrontation between skinheads and local young people in summer 1979. The concept of a monitoring group was taken from the Black Panthers.

The Southall Monitoring Group was active in campaigns for justice by several families: that of Kuldip Sekhon, killed in 1989; that of Stephen Lawrence, killed in 1993; that of Ricky Reel, killed in 1997; and that of Michael Menson, also killed in 1997. After the Macpherson Report the group created a national network, and renamed itself The Monitoring Group.

== Recent activity ==
In 2015 the Monitoring Group petitioned the UK Home Secretary to guarantee that police whistleblowers would not face punishment for revealing the extent of their undercover spying on UK political groups. The group joined with the Awaaz Network to demonstrate against the visit of Narendra Modi to the UK in November 2015. After the 2016 Brexit referendum, The Monitoring Group reported a rise in racist violence, and two years later confirmed that there had been a rise in race hate crimes.

The group continues to call for an inquiry into the death of Blair Peach, They criticized the secrecy surrounding Hampshire Police's internal investigation into homophobia and racism at the force's Basingstoke investigation centre. They have supported the mother of Christopher Kapessa in her complaint against South Wales Police's inaction after her 13-year-old son's death. In 2020 the group urged attention to COVID-19-related race hate against Chinese communities, as well as other groups. The group participated in Black Lives Matter demonstrations in 2020, and supported a teenager injured by far right protestors, who was then stopped and searched by a Metropolitan Police officer whom he had asked for help. In August 2020 the Monitoring Group criticised the appointment of Tony Sewell, who had earlier minimised the effect of institutional racism, to chair a new Government Commission tasked with looking into racial inequality.
