= Hazel Wood High School =

Location
- Hazel Avenue; Bury, Greater Manchester, BL9 7QT; England; 53°35′37″N 2°16′27″W

Information
- Type: Academy
- Established: 2nd September 2019
- Local authority: Bury
- Trust: Oak Learning Partnership
- Department for Education URN: 146970 Tables
- Ofsted: Reports
- Chair of local governing body: Sheila Gaskell
- Headteacher: Adele Hulton
- Gender: Coeducational
- Age: 11 to 16
- Enrolment: 655 pupils
- Houses: 5
- Trust UID: 17194
- Website: http://www.hazelwoodhigh.co.uk/

Hazel Wood High School, formerly known as Broad Oak Sports College, is a coeducational 11-16 secondary school located on Hazel Avenue about a mile to the east of Bury town centre in Greater Manchester, England. It is part of the Oak Learning Partnership.

== History ==
Broad Oak High School was formed from various mergers, with previous schools including Ashmeadow, Bellgate, Seedfield and Wellington.

In 2019, the school changed its name from Broad Oak Sports College to Hazel Wood High School.

== School organisation ==
When Ofsted visited in 2014, they found a smaller than average secondary school with a highly mobile population. It entered its mainly White British heritage students early for GCSE. This was classified as a good school.

In 2018 Ofsted judged the school had changed in many ways. There had been a large turnover of staff including two changes of headteacher, and the pupils now came from diverse backgrounds, many (a quarter) from families where English was not the mother tongue. The school met the Department for Education's definition of a coasting school based on key stage 4 academic performance results in 2015 to 2017. Ofsted judged the school inadequate. The governors were removed and an Interim Executive Board put in place. The name of the school was changed.

== Incidents ==
- In 2012, a teacher, Ms Bailey, died by suicide. Evidence was given in an inquest that she was bullied by other staff members.
- In June 2019, a student, twelve-year-old refugee Shukri Abdi, was found dead in the River Irwell. Her mother said that she had reported to the school that her child was being bullied repeatedly since twelve months prior to the incident. The school launched an internal investigation into bullying which concluded in August. Abdi's family criticised the report as insufficiently detailed and are still seeking Justice.
- In January 2025, police launched an investigation after a mass brawl involving dozens of youths broke out on Poplar Avenue, near the school grounds. Video footage circulated showing pupils kicking and stamping on one another, prompting the school to initiate internal disciplinary sanctions.
- In November 2025, a former teacher at the school, Mark Rowley, was banned from the teaching profession indefinitely. A Teaching Regulation Agency misconduct panel found that in 2022 he had engaged in a "sexually motivated" relationship with a pupil, which included sending inappropriate messages and a handwritten letter. Rowley had resigned from Hazel Wood High School in September 2022 after being suspended.
