= Bookmarks (magazine) =

American literary magazine

Bookmarks Magazine
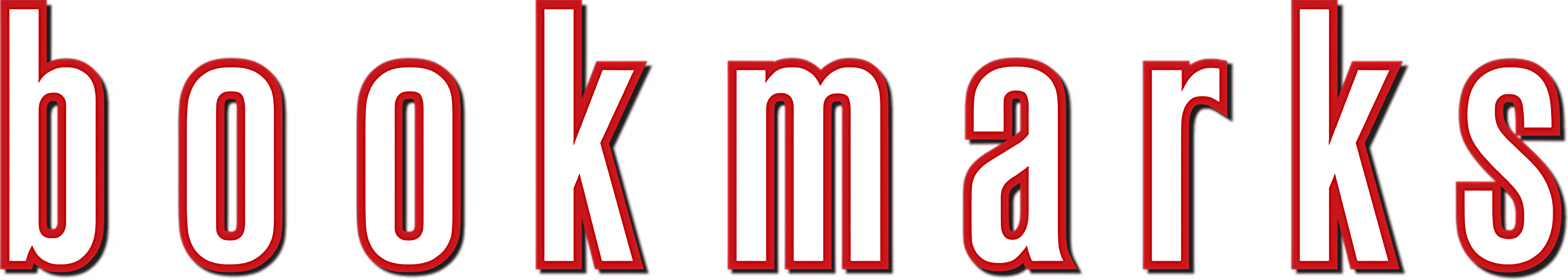
- Editor: Jessica Teisch
- Categories: Literary/Entertainment
- Frequency: Bimonthly, Print and Digital
- Publisher: Jessica Teisch
- First issue: Summer 2002
- Company: Bookmarks Publishing, LLC
- Country: USA
- Based in: Berkeley, California
- Language: English
- Website: bookmarksmagazine.com
- ISSN: 1546-0657

Bookmarks is a bimonthly American literary magazine dedicated to general readers, book groups, and librarians. It carries the tagline, "For everyone who hasn't read everything." It is in both print and digital format.

Launched in 2002, Bookmarks is a book review aggregator and additionally includes articles covering classic and contemporary authors, "best-of" genre reading lists, reader recommendations, and book group profiles. It was named a "Best New Magazine" shortly after its debut by Library Journal. Kurt Vonnegut weighed in as well to rave, “I am beguiled by your physical beauty, and I am moved by how head-over-heels in love with books you are. And nowhere else have I found such thoughtful and literate reportage on the state of the American soul, as that soul makes itself known in the books we write.”

Bookmarks magazine has been based in Berkeley, California, since 2019. It was previously headquartered in Chapel Hill, North Carolina.

== Content ==
Each issue contains a New Books Guide (a selection of 45-50 new books in all genres, hand-picked by the editors), Literary Awards, a Book Group profile, a "Have You Read" article submitted by readers, and author profiles and genre articles. The May/June 2026 issue featured the articles "Middle East, in Translation," "If You love Children's Classics," and "Strange Sleuths." Other recent issues have published articles on "Great Series Starters for Every Reader," "Reading Challenges," "Great Opening Lines," "The Legacy of the Renaissance in Fiction and Nonfiction," and "Great Literary Sequels."
