= Death of Shukri Abdi =

2019 drowning of a child in England

- Date: 27 June 2019
- Location: River Irwell, England
- Cause: Drowning
- Deaths: Shukri Abdi
- Burial: 5 July 2019
- Verdict: Accident

Shukri Yahye-Abdi drowned in the River Irwell, England on 27 June 2019. Aged 12, she was a refugee from Somalia who had lived in a refugee camp in Kenya until moving to England in 2017. She was with pupils from her school, Broad Oak High School, at the time of her death. Subsequent to her death, police reported there were no suspicious circumstances; however, Abdi's mother reported information and said that she had been complaining to her daughter's school about incidents of bullying for over a year.

An inquest initiated in 2019 and completed in December 2020 concluded that Abdi's death was an accident. Broad Oak High School launched an internal investigation into the subject of bullying. Abdi's family have been dissatisfied by responses by the police and the school. An investigation by the Independent Office for Police Conduct (IOPC) over whether they were poorly treated for racially motivated reasons did not find evidence that they were. In January 2021, the family launched a civil suit against police.

Protests and a petition for a criminal investigation began with the Justice4Shukri campaign in July 2019, the petition garnering a million signatures by June 2020. Black Lives Matter protests across the United Kingdom marked the first anniversary of Abdi's death.

== Background ==
Shukri Yahye-Abdi's family originate from Somalia. They lived in a refugee camp in Kenya from 2000 to 2017. The family moved to Bury under the UK's vulnerable person's resettlement scheme in January 2017. They had to be vetted by the United Nations to be accepted to the scheme. Initial reports by media outlets including The Telegraph and Manchester Evening News incorrectly claimed that Abdi arrived in the UK around 2018. Abdi had four younger siblings. She attended Broad Oak High School.

== Death ==
Shukri Abdi drowned in the River Irwell on 27 June. Two individuals reportedly noticed the incident and entered the river to attempt to rescue Abdi. Police were called to the River Irwell at 8 p.m. An underwater search team recovered Abdi's body shortly before midnight. Her mother, who had begun searching for her at 4 p.m., was informed of her death at 1 a.m. Reports at the time in The Telegraph and The Times stated that Abdi was playing with two friends at the time, despite her mother believing the girls to have not been friends of hers. Two children at the scene had seen Abdi disappear in the river.

Her mother reported that Abdi was being bullied in the weeks prior to her death. Over the past year, she had made complaints to her daughter's school, which she believed the school did not take seriously. The Guardian reported that there were other accounts of bullying being poorly dealt with by the school. An inquest found that one child told her carer that she threatened to kill Abdi, in a "laughing and joking manner", if she didn't enter the water. Another child reported that the same child had been bullying Abdi earlier that day. A carer of one of the children present reported that Abdi came to their house for dinner, along with another child. The children all left together afterwards. They may have attempted to shoplift. The family believed Abdi to have been wearing "full Islamic dress" at the time of her death, according to HuffPost.

Abdi's mother expressed initial confusion over how Abdi had ended up in the river. Her uncle reported that as she couldn't swim, she "wouldn't even go near the edge" of bodies of water, calling the incident "out of character".

== Investigations ==
In June 2019, the Greater Manchester Police reported that the event was a "tragic incident". Detective Inspector Andrew Naismith said that "We have a team of detectives working on this, but there are not believed to be any suspicious circumstances at this time." The investigation was reportedly still active in August, according to HuffPost.

An inquest was raised by Rochdale Coroner's Court and opened on 9 July 2019. It heard that CCTV had been recovered of Abdi with some other children together earlier in the evening, but none from the river itself or the path that leads to it. Four children were interviewed in connection with the death, their parents present for the interview. In July 2019, the inquest was adjourned to December 2019.

Critical of the police response, her mother said in July (via a translator) that "If the rights we came to the country for exist, I want something done". A lawyer for the family said that because the police's statements were published within hours of Abdi's death, insufficient time had been dedicated to the investigation. The family reported that they were treated improperly by police because of their race.

An internal investigation by Broad Oak High School concluded in August 2019. Abdi's family were dissatisfied by the report, believing it to be insufficiently detailed. They criticised the manner in which they were treated when going to the police station to receive the report.

In August 2019, the Independent Office for Police Conduct (IOPC) launched an investigation into police conduct following Abdi's death, after a complaint in July. The investigation was to determine if the family's ethnicity was a factor in how they were treated by police. The inquest resumed in February 2020. It did not consider bullying accusations. It was adjourned around the end of the month. The inquest resumed in November 2020, with a verdict on 4 December 2020 that the death was an accident. The IOPC's report, published when the inquest concluded, found that there was not evidence that the police's response was racially motivated, and the complaints against the police were not upheld.

The coroner said there was no evidence of racist bullying by other children and recommended a commendation for two of the children who tried to save Abdi's life. A 2022 judicial review of the coroner's conclusions, brought by Abdi's family, was dismissed in May 2022. In January 2021, Abdi's family began civil action against the police.

== Public reaction ==
Protests later developed after the police's and school's initial response to Abdi's death. The campaign Justice4Shukri was founded. A petition calling for a criminal investigation to be launched had garnered either 32,000 signatures by July, according to the Bury Times, or 5,000 signatures by August 2019, according to HuffPost. It had garnered 100,000 signatures by May 2020. By mid-June, this number had risen to 850,000, reaching one million by the end of the month. A separate petition about both Abdi's death and that of Christopher Kapessa reached 5,000 signatures by March 2020.

In June 2020, for the first anniversary of Abdi's death, eight protests in association with Black Lives Matter took place in the UK, locations including Birmingham, Cardiff, Manchester, London and Sheffield. Additional protests occurred in Los Angeles and Toronto. The BBC reported that thousands of people attended the protests. Justice4Shukri member Maz Saleem commented that "People are angry that a young black refugee child was neglected by the very institutions that were there to protect her". He believed that "systemic and institutional racism played a huge role" in the incidents.
