= Bookmarks (bookshop) =

Socialist bookshop in London, England

Coordinates: 51.5147°N 0.1301°W

Bookmarks Bookshop Ltd

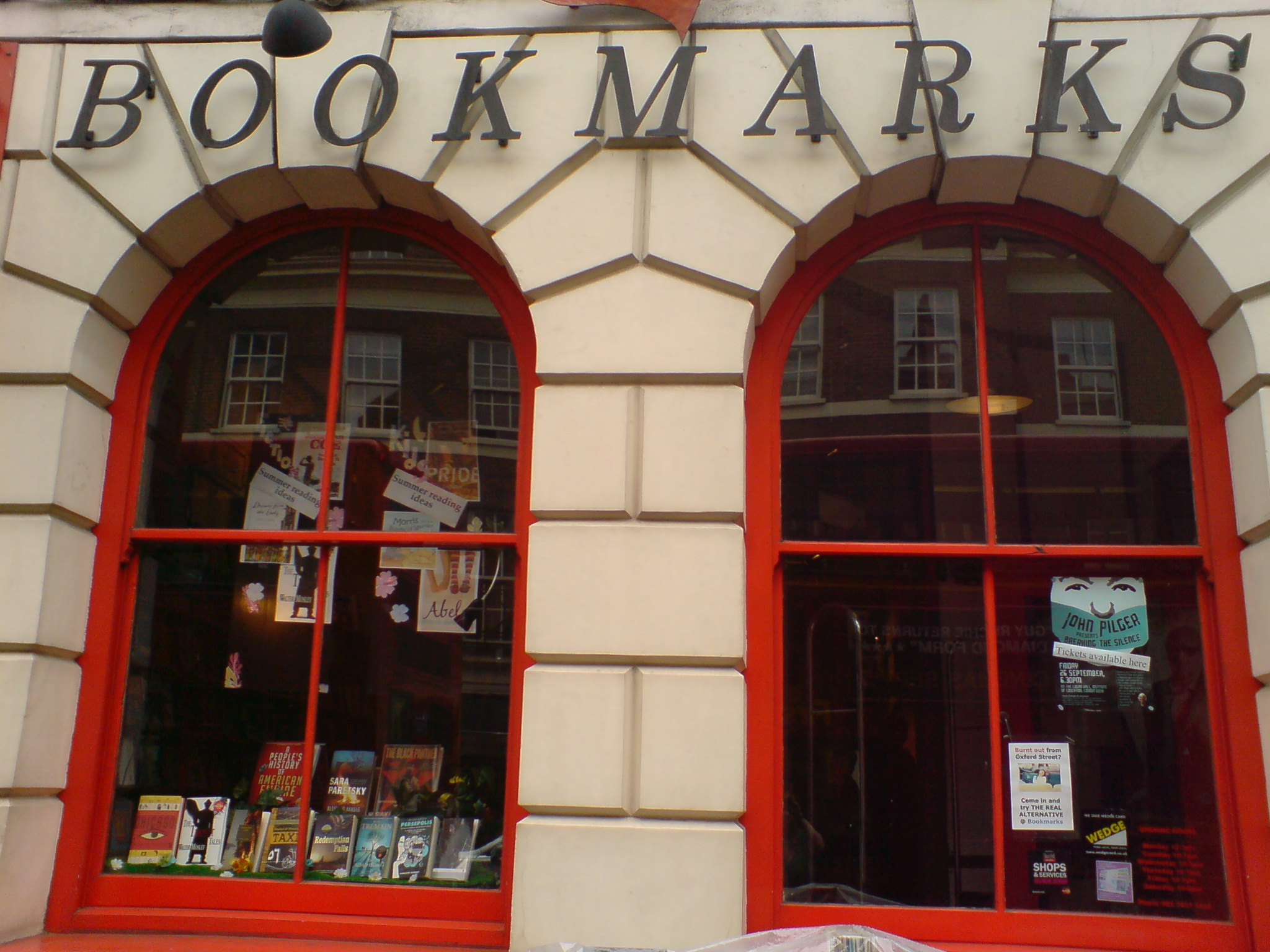
- The front of Bookmarks
- Industry: Retail bookshop
- Headquarters: 1 Bloomsbury Street, London
- Products: Books, magazines, journals, DVDs, CDs, Trades Union Congress publications, merchandise
- Website: bookmarksbookshop.co.uk

Bookmarks is Britain's largest socialist bookshop. It is based in Bloomsbury, London. The company has published books since 1979 and is the official bookseller for the Trades Union Congress.

== The bookshop ==
Bookmarks specialises in non-fictional and fictional books that concern politics, economics, anti-fascism, anarchism, labour history, trade unionism, arts and culture, anti-racism, the environment, biographies, and feminism. It also stocks radical books for children, eBooks, CDs, and DVDs. Their range of merchandise includes posters, mugs, bags, and cards. Novelty items stocked by Bookmarks include anti-Tory mugs and 'sherbet Lenin' soap. Live events are streamed from Bookmarks' YouTube channel.

British politician Tony Benn described Bookmarks as "the university for activists." The bookshop is a member of the Alliance of Radical Booksellers.

== Premises ==
Bookmarks originally began trading in 1971 as I.S. Books and was based at the Cotton Gardens International Socialists office until 1973. Between 1973 and 1974, the name Bookmarks was adopted and new premises were opened at 265 Seven Sisters Road, Finsbury Park, London. In the 1980s, this was also the mailing address for The Radical Bookseller, a magazine for the radical book trade.

In 1998, Bookmarks opened its premises at 1 Bloomsbury Street, London.

== Bookmarks Publications ==
Bookmarks publishes books and pamphlets that address issues concerning activists and trade unionists. A publishing company has existed in some form since 1979.

== 2018: far-right protestors ==
On 4 August 2018, far-right protestors entered Bookmarks, wrecked displays, and intimidated staff. The campaign group Stand Up to Racism claimed that one individual wore a Donald Trump mask whilst other assailants held placards reading "British Bolshevik Cult." The incident took place after a far-right protest connected to the conspiracy theory website InfoWars. Onsite staff called the police and no arrests were made.

The American philosopher and linguist Noam Chomsky called the incident a "shameful attack." Further messages of support came from the Labour Party politician David Lammy, author Michael Rosen, and singer-songwriter Billy Bragg. A solidarity event held on 11 August of the same year was attended by more than 500 supporters. Michael Rosen wrote a special poem for the event that included the line: "Anytime we think they’re just having a laugh, let’s remember the joker with the toothbrush moustache."

Later that month, the right-wing UK Independence Party announced the suspension of three party members pending an investigation into the incident. The suspension applied to Elizabeth Jones, Luke Nash-Jones and Martin Costello. Jones was later cleared of wrongdoing and reinstated to the party. The campaigning publishing organisation Index on Censorship sent six books to the suspended UKIP members to "introduce them to different ideas". The titles issued included Upton Sinclair's The Jungle, Ray Bradbury's Fahrenheit 451, and Philip Pullman's His Dark Materials Trilogy.

A Bookmarks employee claimed that a previous attack on the shop took place in the 1970s.

Bookmarks' manager, David Gilchrist, wrote in The Guardian that such events sprang from "a fertile ground prepared by Theresa May's “hostile environment” for migrants." Gilchrist's article concluded with: "The most important outcome will be if more people learn the true meaning of solidarity."
