= List of celebrities involved with WrestleMania =

WrestleMania is a professional wrestling pay-per-view event produced by the American promotion WWE, formerly known as the World Wrestling Federation (WWF), and is considered the flagship event of the company. The events feature wrestlers from the promotion's roster competing in a variety of professional wrestling matches. The WrestleMania franchise debuted in 1985 with WrestleMania I, and has been produced annually since. WrestleMania XL in 2024 was the most recent production.

Aside from professional wrestling performances, celebrities have been a major key in the production of WrestleMania events. WWE involves them to attract more hype and media attention for the event, in an effort to boost pay-per-view buys and ticket sales. The celebrities involved with WrestleMania events have come from a range of occupations, including singing, acting, sports, and modeling, and have been used in a variety of roles, such as live musical performances, backstage segments, ringside managers, and on some occasions, competing in a wrestling match.

Overall, there have been 143 celebrities involved at WrestleMania: 55 musicians (with groups counted as one), 34 athletes, 25 actors, and 29 from various other backgrounds. 10 of these celebrities have also been inducted into the celebrity wing of the WWE Hall of Fame.

== Celebrities ==
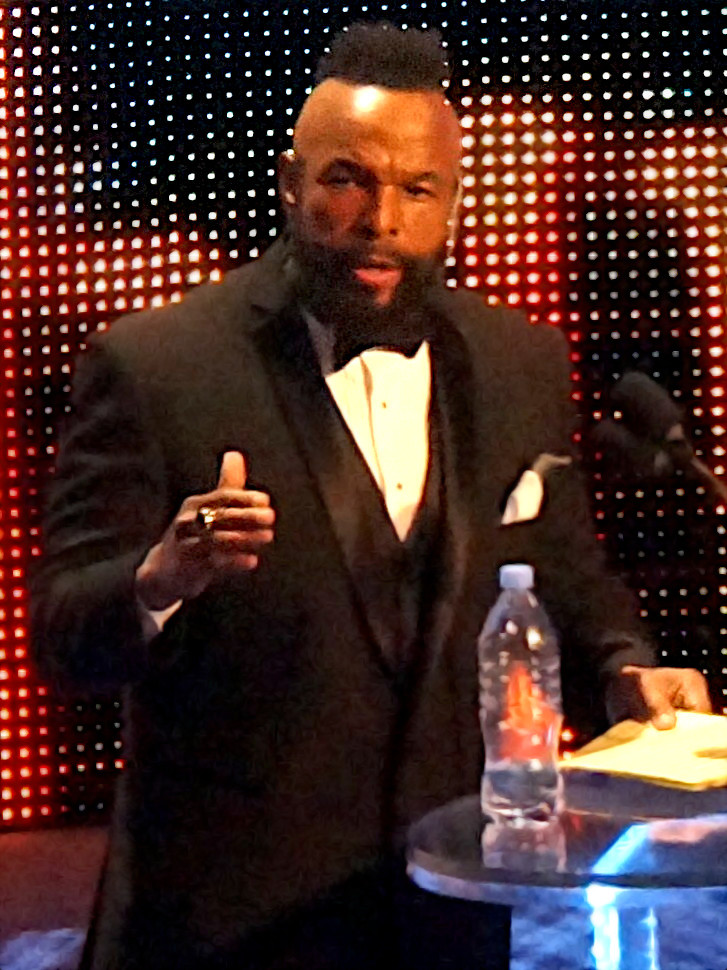
Mr. T

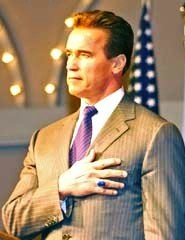
Arnold Schwarzenegger

– indicates inducted into the celebrity wing of the WWE Hall of Fame

=== Actors ===
Celebrity	Appearance	Role	Refs
Steve Allen	WrestleMania VI	Interviewer	
Pamela Anderson	WrestleMania XI	Valet of Diesel in his WWF Championship match against Shawn Michaels	
Michael Che	WrestleMania 35	Participated in the André the Giant Memorial Battle Royal	
Robert Conrad	WrestleMania 2	Guest referee at the Los Angeles Memorial Sports Arena in Los Angeles	
Cathy Lee Crosby	WrestleMania 2	Guest commentator at the Rosemont Horizon in Rosemont, Illinois	
Jennie Garth	WrestleMania X	Guest timekeeper	
Susan St. James	WrestleMania 2	Guest commentator at the Nassau Veterans Memorial Coliseum in Uniondale, New York	
Colin Jost	WrestleMania 35	Participated in the André the Giant Memorial Battle Royal	
Marla Maples	WrestleMania VII	Guest timekeeper	
Jenny McCarthy	WrestleMania XI	Valet of Shawn Michaels in his WWF Championship match against Diesel	
Johnny Knoxville	WrestleMania 38	Wrestled against Sami Zayn in a Anything Goes match	
Cassandra Peterson as Elvira	WrestleMania 2	Guest commentator at the Los Angeles Memorial Sports Arena in Los Angeles	
Regis Philbin	WrestleMania VII	Interviewer, Guest commentator	
Raven Symoné	WrestleMania XXIV	Promoted the Make-A-Wish Foundation in an in-ring segment	
Paul Reubens as Pee-wee Herman	WrestleMania XXVII	Appeared in a backstage segment	
Burt Reynolds	WrestleMania X	Guest ring announcer for the main event	
Joan Rivers	WrestleMania 2	Guest ring announcer at the Nassau Veterans Memorial Coliseum in Uniondale, New York	
Mickey Rourke	WrestleMania 25	Involved in an altercation with Chris Jericho	
Rick Schroder	WrestleMania 2	Guest timekeeper at the Los Angeles Memorial Sports Arena in Los Angeles	
Arnold Schwarzenegger	WrestleMania 31	Appeared in video intro for Triple H's match against Sting	
Rhonda Shear	WrestleMania X	Guest timekeeper	
Mr. T	WrestleMania I	Wrestled in a tag team match with Hulk Hogan against Roddy Piper and Paul Orndorff	
Mr. T	WrestleMania 2	Participated in a boxing match against Roddy Piper	
Jonathan Taylor Thomas	WrestleMania XI	Guest timekeeper	
Nicholas Turturro	WrestleMania XI	Interviewer and guest ring announcer	
Mark Wahlberg	WrestleMania 38	Opening introduction	

=== Athletes ===
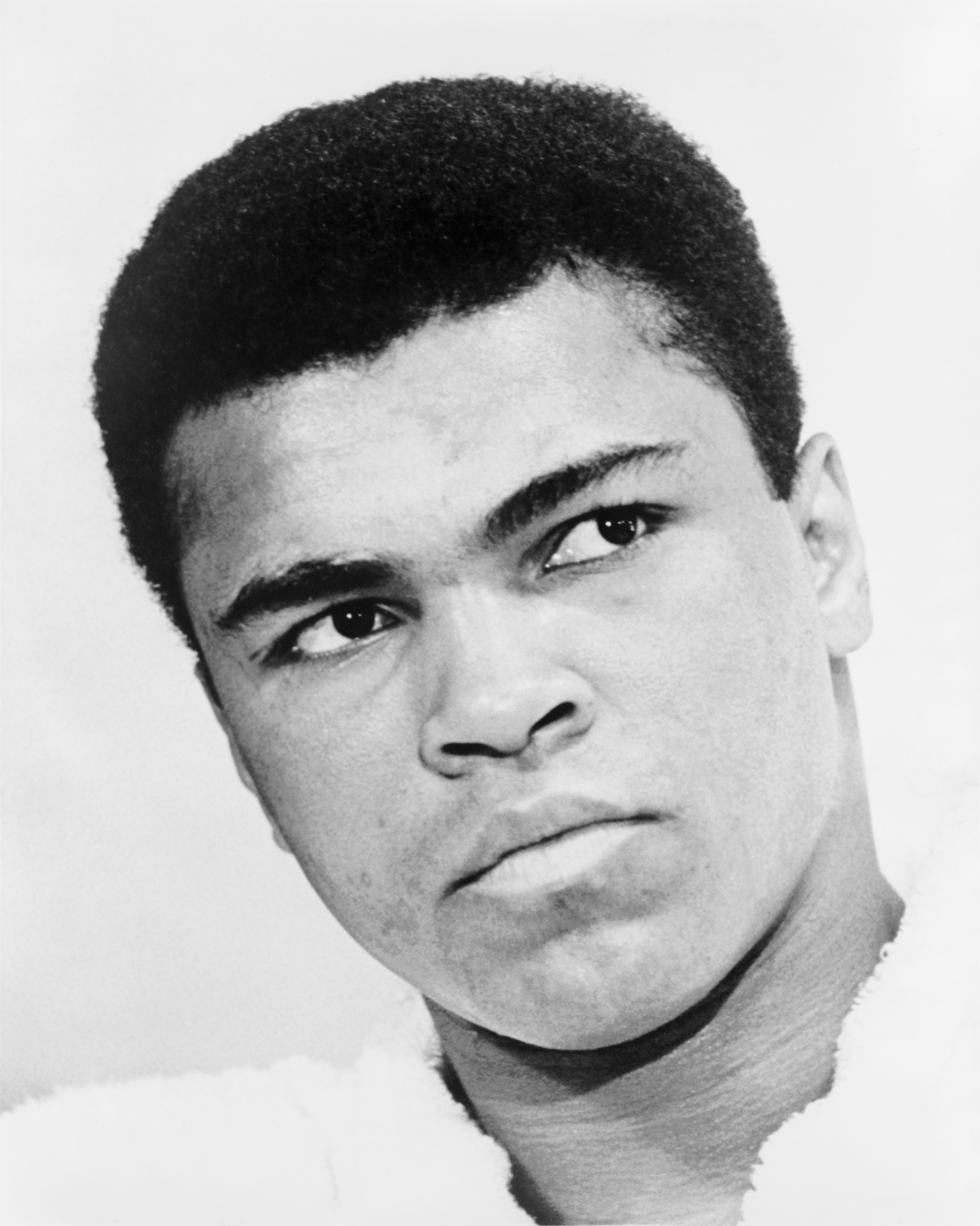
Muhammad Ali

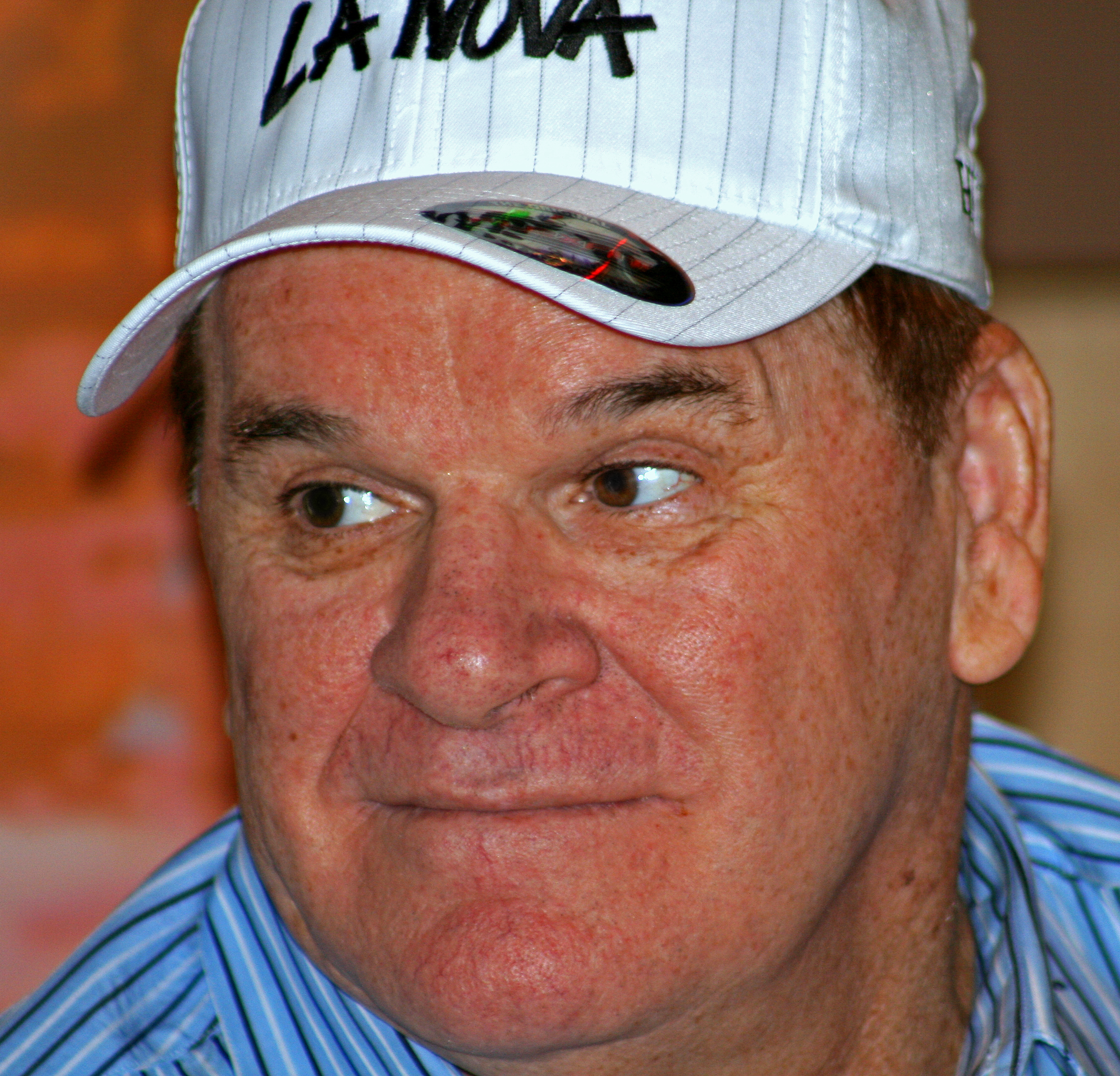
Pete Rose

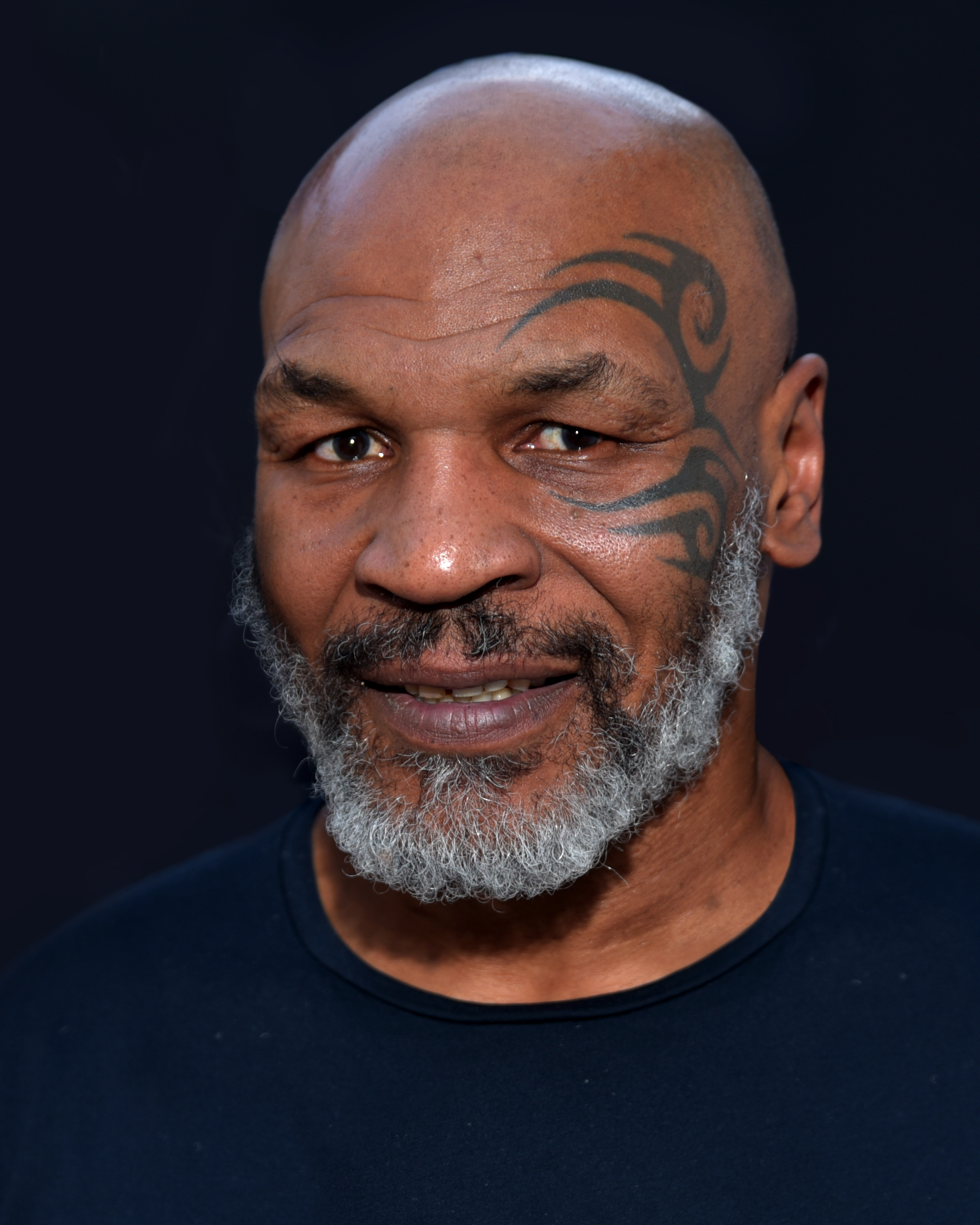
Mike Tyson

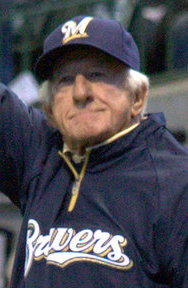
Bob Uecker

Celebrity	Profession	Appearance	Role	Refs
Muhammad Ali	Professional boxer	WrestleMania I	Guest referee for the main event	
Carl Banks	Linebacker for the New York Giants	WrestleMania XI	Manager of Lawrence Taylor in his match against Bam Bam Bigelow	
Carl Banks	Linebacker for the New York Giants	WrestleMania 2	Guest referee	
Carl Banks	Linebacker for the New York Giants	WrestleMania VII	Involved in a skit	
Jim Covert	Offensive tackle for the Chicago Bears	WrestleMania 2	Wrestled in a Battle royal, an elimination style match in which the last person remaining is the winner, involving other NFL football players	
Darryl Dawkins	Basketball player	WrestleMania 2	Judge for the boxing match between Mr. T and Roddy Piper	
Lou Duva	Professional boxing trainer	WrestleMania 2	Manager of Roddy Piper in his boxing match against Mr. T	
Eric Esch	Professional boxer	WrestleMania XV	Fought in an unscripted Brawl For All match, knocking out opponent Bart Gunn	
Bill Fralic	Offensive guard for the Atlanta Falcons	WrestleMania 2	Wrestled in a Battle royal, an elimination style match in which the last person remaining is the winner, involving other NFL football players	
Russ Francis	Tight end for the San Francisco 49ers	WrestleMania 2	Wrestled in a Battle royal, an elimination style match in which the last person remaining is the winner, involving other NFL football players	
Joe Frazier	Professional boxer	WrestleMania 2	Manager of Mr. T in his boxing match against Roddy Piper	
Rob Gronkowski	Tight end for the Tampa Bay Buccaneers	WrestleMania 33	Was in the crowd for the André the Giant Memorial Battle Royal where he got into an argument with Jinder Mahal. Gronkowski then entered the ring and helped his friend Mojo Rawley to win the match and trophy.	
Rob Gronkowski	Tight end for the Tampa Bay Buccaneers	WrestleMania 36	Was host for the two-night event, but left after winning the WWE 24/7 Championship during the second night.	
Ernie Holmes	Defensive tackle for the Pittsburgh Steelers	WrestleMania 2	Wrestled in a Battle royal, an elimination style match in which the last person remaining is the winner, involving other NFL football players	
Rickey Jackson	Linebacker for the New Orleans Saints	WrestleMania XI	Manager of Lawrence Taylor in his match against Bam Bam Bigelow	
Lane Johnson	Offensive tackle for the Philadelphia Eagles	WrestleMania XL (Night 1)	Helped Rey Mysterio and Andrade during Tag Team Match	
Ed Jones	Defensive end for the Dallas Cowboys	WrestleMania 2	Guest referee	
Jason Kelce	Former Center for the Philadelphia Eagles	WrestleMania XL (Night 1)	Helped Rey Mysterio and Andrade during Tag Team Match	
Tommy Lasorda	Manager for the Los Angeles Dodgers	WrestleMania 2	Guest ring announcer at the Los Angeles Memorial Sports Arena in Los Angeles	
Paul Maguire	Linebacker for the Buffalo Bills	WrestleMania VII	Involved in a skit	
Billy Martin	Second baseman for the New York Yankees	WrestleMania I	Guest ring announcer	
Harvey Martin	Defensive end for the Dallas Cowboys	WrestleMania 2	Wrestled in a Battle royal, an elimination style match in which the last person remaining is the winner, involving other NFL football players	
Floyd Mayweather Jr.	Professional boxer	WrestleMania XXIV	Wrestled in a No disqualification match against the Big Show	
Steve McMichael	Defensive tackle for the Chicago Bears	WrestleMania XI	Manager of Lawrence Taylor in his match against Bam Bam Bigelow	
Ken Norton Jr.	Linebacker for the Dallas Cowboys	WrestleMania XI	Manager of Lawrence Taylor in his match against Bam Bam Bigelow	
Shaquille O'Neal	Basketball player and analyst	WrestleMania 32	Participated in the André the Giant Memorial Battle Royal	
Vinny Pazienza	Professional boxer	WrestleMania XV	Guest referee for the Brawl for All rules match between Eric Esch and Bart Gunn	
William Perry	Defensive lineman for the Chicago Bears	WrestleMania 2	Wrestled in a Battle royal, an elimination style match in which the last person remaining is the winner, involving other NFL football players	
William Perry	Defensive lineman for the Chicago Bears	WrestleMania 22	Appeared as a part of the WWE Hall of Fame Class of 2006	
Kevin Rooney	Professional boxing trainer	WrestleMania XV	Judge for the Brawl for All rules match between Eric Esch and Bart Gunn	
Pete Rose	Player/Manager for the Cincinnati Reds	WrestleMania XIV	Guest ring announcer and involved in a physical altercation with Kane	
Pete Rose	Player/Manager for the Cincinnati Reds	WrestleMania XV	Dressed as the San Diego Chicken and involved in an altercation with Kane	
Pete Rose	Player/Manager for the Cincinnati Reds	WrestleMania 2000	Was involved in an altercation with Kane and Rikishi	
Pete Rose	Player/Manager for the Cincinnati Reds	WrestleMania XX	Appeared as a part of the WWE Hall of Fame Class of 2004	
Chris Spielman	Linebacker for the Detroit Lions	WrestleMania XI	Manager of Lawrence Taylor in his match against Bam Bam Bigelow	
Lawrence Taylor	Linebacker for the New York Giants	WrestleMania XI	Wrestled in a standard wrestling match against Bam Bam Bigelow in the main event	
Mike Tyson	Professional boxer	WrestleMania XIV	Ringside enforcer for the main event and was involved in a physical altercation with Shawn Michaels	
Bob Uecker	Catcher for the Atlanta Braves	WrestleMania III	Interviewer, Guest commentator, Guest Ring Announcer	
Bob Uecker	Catcher for the Atlanta Braves	WrestleMania IV	Interviewer, Guest commentator, Guest Ring Announcer	
Bob Uecker	Catcher for the Atlanta Braves	WrestleMania XXVI	Appeared as a part of the WWE Hall of Fame Class of 2010	
Chuck Wepner	Professional boxer	WrestleMania XV	Judge for the Brawl for All rules match between Eric Esch and Bart Gunn	
Reggie White	Defensive end for the Green Bay Packers	WrestleMania XI	Manager of Lawrence Taylor in his match against Bam Bam Bigelow	
Larry Young	Umpire	WrestleMania XI	Guest referee	
George Kittle	Tight end for the San Francisco 49ers	WrestleMania 39	Helped Pat McAfee to defeat The Miz	

=== Musicians ===
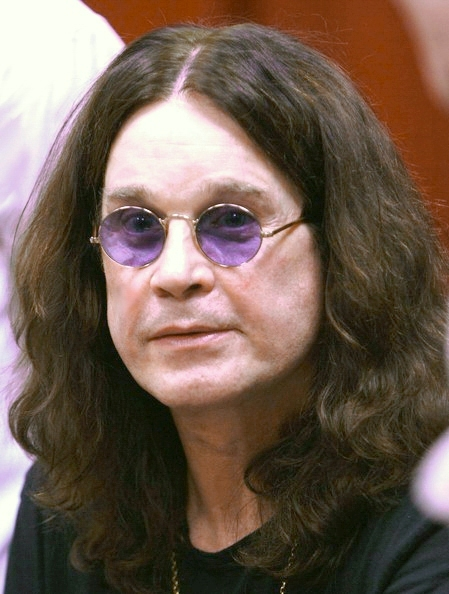
Ozzy Osbourne

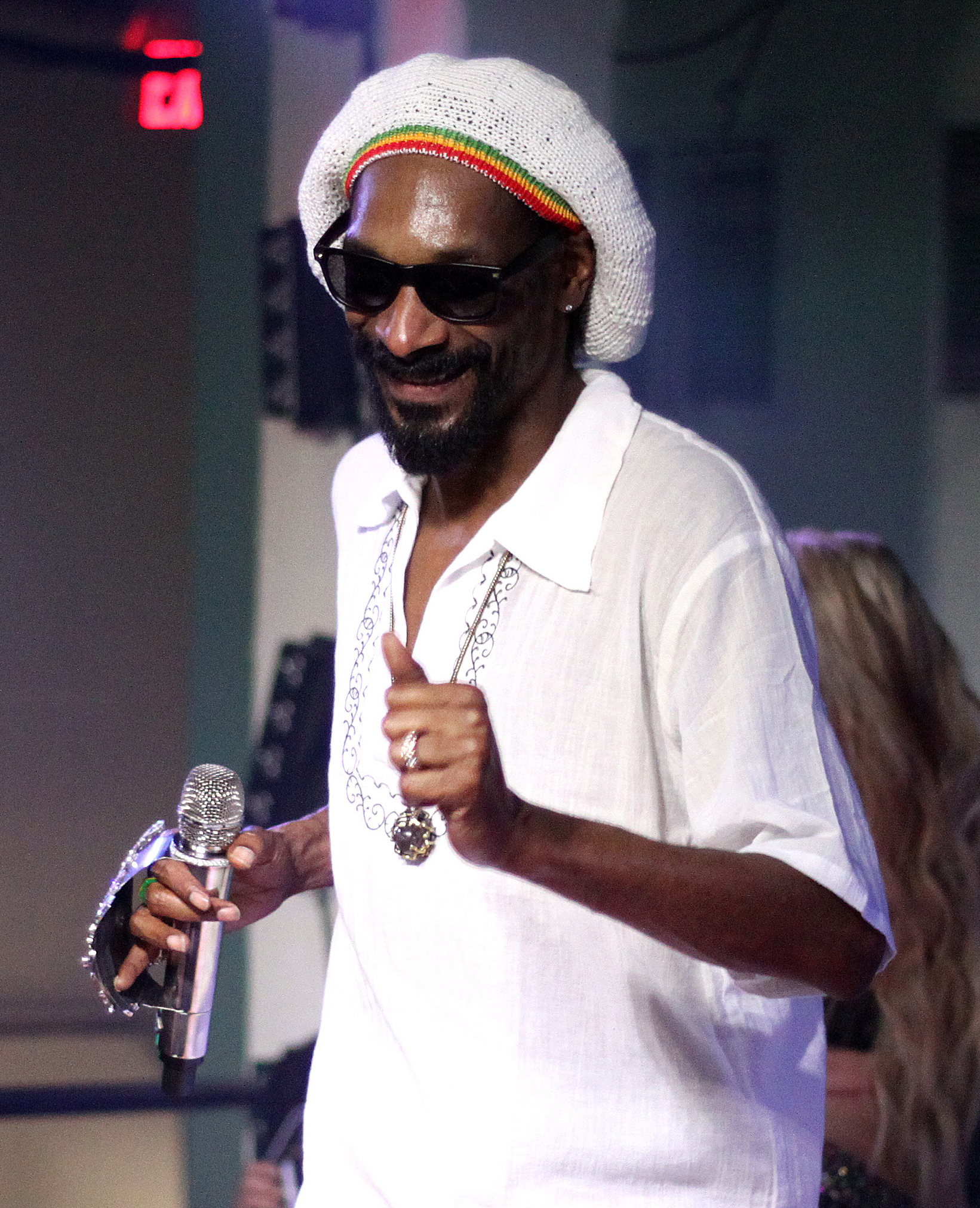
Snoop Dogg

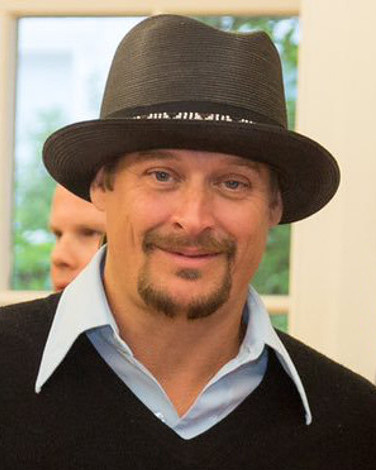
Kid Rock

Celebrity(s)	Genre(s)	Appearance	Role	Refs
Jimmie Allen	Country	WrestleMania 39	Sang a rendition of "America the Beautiful" on Night 2	
Ashanti	R&B	WrestleMania XIX	Sang a rendition of "America the Beautiful"	
Aloe Blacc	R&B	WrestleMania 31	Sang a rendition of "America the Beautiful"	
Ava Max	Pop	WrestleMania 41	Performed the national anthem on Night 2.	
Bad Bunny	Latin hip hop	WrestleMania 37	Wrestled a tag team match with Damian Priest against The Miz and John Morrison on Night 1.	
Bad Bunny	Latin hip hop	WrestleMania 39	Guest commentator for the Spanish commentary team during the Rey Mysterio vs. Dominik Mysterio match, also got involved and assisted Rey during the match.	
Travis Barker	Alternative rock	WrestleMania 31	Performed "Money and the Power" with Kid Ink and Skylar Grey	
Fantasia Barrino	R&B/Soul	WrestleMania XXVI	Sang a rendition of "America the Beautiful"	
Boys Choir of Harlem	Gospel	WrestleMania XX	Sang a rendition of "America the Beautiful"	
Boyz II Men	R&B/Soul	WrestleMania XV	Sang a rendition of "America the Beautiful"	
Cab Calloway	Jazz/blues	WrestleMania 2	Judge for boxing match between Mr. T and Rowdy Roddy Piper	
Ray Charles	R&B/Soul	WrestleMania 2	Sang a rendition of "America the Beautiful"	
Sean "Diddy" Combs	Hip hop	WrestleMania XXVIII	Introduced Machine Gun Kelly to the crowd.	
Sean "Diddy" Combs	Hip hop	WrestleMania 29	Sang the theme song "Coming Home" for the event	
Alice Cooper	Rock	WrestleMania III	Manager of Jake Roberts in his match against The Honky Tonk Man	
Ash Costello	Rock	WrestleMania 37	Performed "This is My Brutality" for Rhea Ripley's entrance on Night 2.	
Ashland Craft	Country	WrestleMania 37	Sang a rendition of "America the Beautiful" on Night 2.	
Mark Crozer and the Rels	Alternative rock	WrestleMania XXX	Performed "Live in Fear" for Bray Wyatt's entrance	
Jessie James Decker	Country	WrestleMania 38 (Night 2)	Performed a rendition of "America the Beautiful"	
Drowning Pool	Alternative metal	WrestleMania X8	Performed "Tear Away" for the event and "The Game" for Triple H's entrance	
The DX Band	Rock	WrestleMania XIV	Sang a rendition of "America the Beautiful" and performed the DX entrance music "Break It Down"	
Fifth Harmony	R&B	WrestleMania 32	Sang a rendition of "America the Beautiful"	
Flo Rida	Hip hop	WrestleMania XXVIII	Sang "Wild Ones" and "Good Feeling"	
Flo Rida	Hip hop	WrestleMania 33	Sang the theme song "Greenlight" for the event	
Aretha Franklin	Soul	WrestleMania III	Sang a rendition of "America the Beautiful"	
Aretha Franklin	Soul	WrestleMania 23	Sang a rendition of "America the Beautiful"	
Becky G	Latin/Pop	WrestleMania 39	Sang a rendition of "America the Beautiful" on Night 1	
Brantley Gilbert	Country	WrestleMania 38 (Night 1)	Sang a rendition of "America the Beautiful	
Robert Goulet	Ballad	WrestleMania VI	Sang a rendition of "O Canada"	
Skylar Grey	Pop/Hip hop	WrestleMania XXVIII	Sang the chorus of "Invincible"	
Skylar Grey	Pop/Hip hop	WrestleMania 31	Performed "Rise" with David Guetta and "Money and the Power" with Kid Ink and Travis Barker	
David Guetta	Pop	WrestleMania 31	Performed "Rise" with Skylar Grey	
Keri Hilson	R&B	WrestleMania XXVII	Sang a rendition of "America the Beautiful"	
Ice-T	Hip hop	WrestleMania 2000	Performed "Pimpin' Ain't Easy" for The Godfather	
Jelly Roll	Country/Hip hop	WrestleMania 41	Performed "God Bless America" on Night 1	
Jelly Roll	Country/Hip hop	WrestleMania 42	Performed an elbow drop to Pat McAfee through the broadcast table, during main event	
Joan Jett and the Blackhearts	Rock	WrestleMania 35	Performed "Bad Reputation" for Ronda Rousey's entrance	
Joe Jonas	Pop	WrestleMania 42	Performed the national anthem on Night 2	
Coco Jones	R&B	WrestleMania XL	Performed the national anthem on Night 1	
Kid Ink	Hip hop	WrestleMania 31	Performed "Money and the Power" with Travis Barker and Skylar Grey	
Meek Mill	Rap	WrestleMania XL	Cold opening introduction	
Kid Rock	Rock	WrestleMania 25	Performed a medley of "Bawitdaba," "Rock N Roll Jesus," "Cowboy," "All Summer Long," and "So Hott"	
Gladys Knight	R&B/Soul	WrestleMania IV	Sang a rendition of "America the Beautiful"	
Lil Wayne	Rap	WrestleMania XL (Night 1)	Performed his song "A Milli" during Jey Uso's entrance	
LL Cool J	Hip hop	WrestleMania 31	Appeared in a video for the introduction of WrestleMania 31	
Cyndi Lauper	Pop	WrestleMania I	Manager of Wendi Richter in her match against Leilani Kai	
John Legend	R&B/Soul	WrestleMania XXIV	Sang a rendition of "America the Beautiful"	
Liberace	Pianist	WrestleMania I	Guest timekeeper	
Lil Uzi Vert	Hip hop	WrestleMania 39	Performed "Just Wanna Rock" before The Usos' entrance on Night 1.	
Lil Yachty	Rap	WrestleMania 42	Accompanied Trick Williams to the ring and interfered in his match with Sami Zayn.	
Limp Bizkit	Nu/rap metal	WrestleMania XIX	Sang the theme song "Crack Addict" for the event and the theme song "Rollin'" for The Undertaker's entrance.	
Little Richard	R&B	WrestleMania X	Sang a rendition of "America the Beautiful"	
Living Colour	Rock	WrestleMania 29	Performed "Cult of Personality" for CM Punk's entrance	
Living Colour	Rock	WrestleMania 41 (Night 1)	Performed "Cult of Personality" for CM Punk's entrance	
Lunchmoney Lewis	Rapper	WrestleMania 33	Sang the theme song "Greenlight" for the event	
Machine Gun Kelly	Hip hop	WrestleMania XXVIII	Sang "Invincible"	
Reba McEntire	Country	WrestleMania VIII	Sang a rendition of "The Star-Spangled Banner"	
Lin-Manuel Miranda	Musical theatre	WrestleMania 42	Narrated the introductionary video for both nights.	
Motionless in White	Metalcore	WrestleMania XL	Performed "Demon in Your Dreams" for Rhea Ripley's entrance	
Motörhead	Heavy metal	WrestleMania X-Seven	Performed "The Game" for Triple H's entrance	
Motörhead	Heavy metal	WrestleMania 21	Performed "The Game" for Triple H's entrance	
Willie Nelson	Country	WrestleMania VII	Sang a rendition of "America the Beautiful"	
Ozzy Osbourne	Heavy metal	WrestleMania 2	Manager of The British Bulldogs in their match against The Dream Team	
Pitbull	Rapper	WrestleMania 33	Sang the theme song "Greenlight" for the event	
P.O.D.	Alternative metal	WrestleMania 22	Performed "Booyaka 619" for Rey Mysterio's entrance	
Stayc Reign	Electropop/Hip hop	WrestleMania XXVIII	Sang the chorus of "Wild Ones"	
Bebe Rexha	Pop	WrestleMania 37	Sang a rendition of "America the Beautiful" on Night 1.	
Rev Theory	Hard Rock	WrestleMania XXX	Performed "Voices" for Randy Orton's entrance	
Run-D.M.C.	Hip hop	WrestleMania V	Performed "The WrestleMania Rap," a song created specifically for the event	
Travis Scott	Rap	WrestleMania 41	Interfered in the main event on behalf of John Cena and had a physical altercation with Cody Rhodes	
Saliva	Alternative metal	WrestleMania X8	Performed "Superstar" for the event and "Turn the Tables" for The Dudley Boyz' entrance.	
Salt-N-Pepa	Hip hop	WrestleMania XI	Performed "Whatta Man" for Lawrence Taylor in his match against Bam Bam Bigelow	
Salvatore Ganacci	DJ	WrestleMania 41 (Night 1)	Performed with Jey Uso	
Nicole Scherzinger	Pop	WrestleMania 25	Sang a rendition of "America the Beautiful"	
Snoop Dogg	Rap	WrestleMania XXIV	Master of Ceremonies for the Bunnymania match.	
Snoop Dogg	Rap	WrestleMania XXVII	Backstage segment with Theodore Long.	
Snoop Dogg	Rap	WrestleMania 32	Performed "Sky's the Limit" for Sasha Banks' entrance.	
Snoop Dogg	Rap	WrestleMania 39	Was the host of both nights alongside The Miz, also subbed in for Shane McMahon against The Miz in a match after Shane legitimately tore his ACL.	
Snoop Dogg	Rap	WrestleMania XL	Special guest commentator for The Pride vs. The Final Testament, and announced Night 2's attendance figures	
Donnie Wahlberg	Pop	WrestleMania X	Guest ring announcer	
Wale	Rapper	WrestleMania 37	Performed "Feel the Power" for Big E's entrance on Night 2.	
The War and Treaty	Soul	WrestleMania XL	Sang a rendition of "God Bless America" on Night 2.	
Michelle Williams	R&B	WrestleMania 22	Sang a rendition of "America the Beautiful"	
The Wonder Years	Rock	WrestleMania 42	Performed "New Lows" for Becky Lynch's entrance.	

=== Other ===
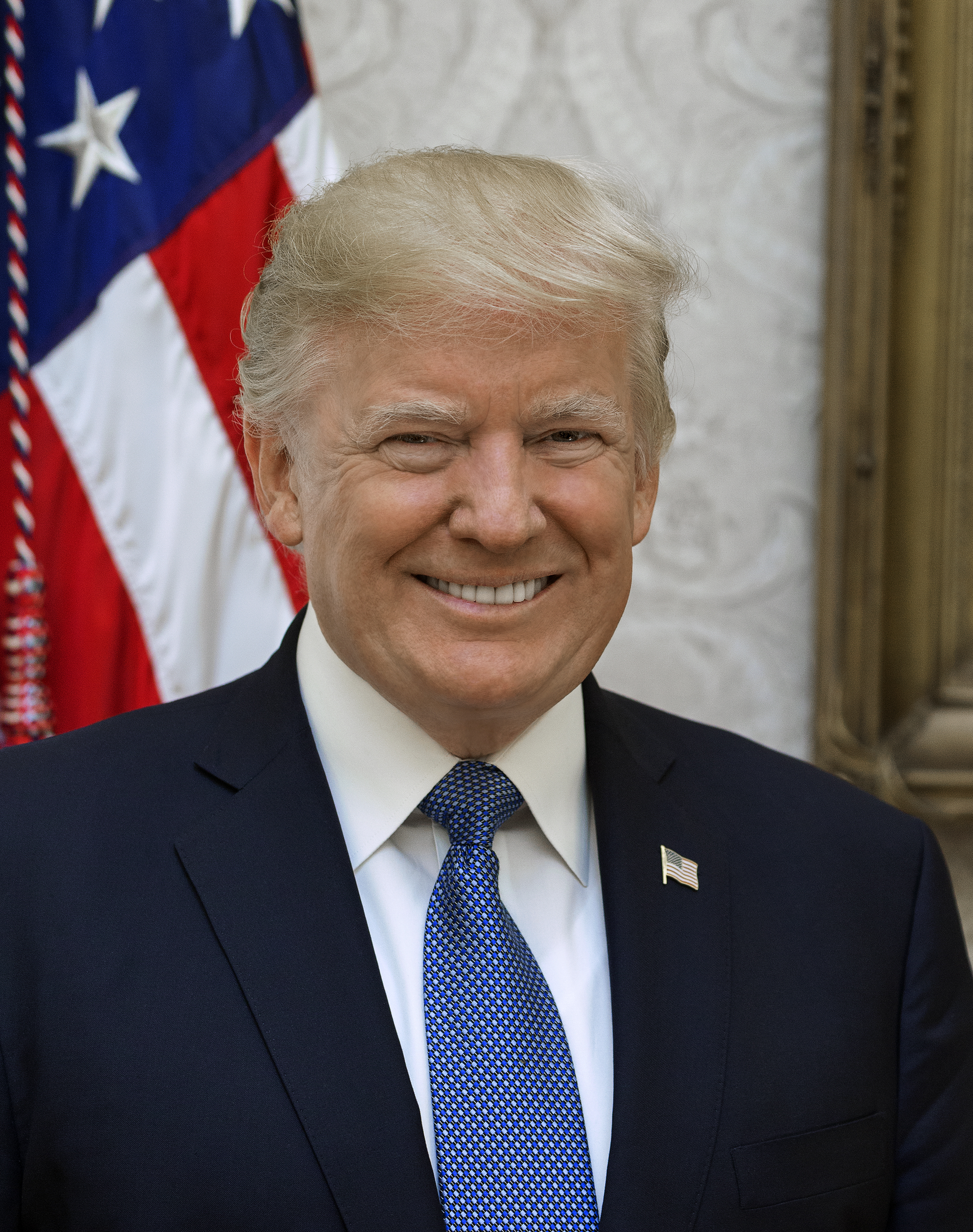
Donald Trump has been involved at three WrestleManias, while venues he owned hosted two additional WrestleManias.

Celebrity(s)	Occupation(s)	Appearance	Role	Refs
Kitana Baker	Model	WrestleMania XIX	Involved in a pillow fight with WWE Divas, Torrie Wilson and Stacy Keibler	
Tanya Ballinger	Model	WrestleMania XIX	Involved in a pillow fight with WWE Divas, Torrie Wilson and Stacy Keibler	
Rona Barrett	Gossip reporter	WrestleMania VI	Interviewer	
Ray Combs	Comedian/Game show host	WrestleMania VIII	Guest ring announcer	
Tara Conner	Beauty queen	WrestleMania 23	Escorted Donald Trump to the ring during the "Battle of the Billionaires"	
Chet Coppock	Radio broadcaster	WrestleMania 2	Guest ring announcer	
Dallas Cowboys Cheerleaders	NFL cheerleading squad	WrestleMania 32	Performed their signature dance to "Thunderstruck" by AC/DC and were a part of The Rock's entrance	
Dallas Cowboys Cheerleaders	NFL cheerleading squad	WrestleMania 38	Performed Night 1 and appeared on stage and cheered Pat McAfee to the ring for his match against Austin Theory	
Morton Downey Jr.	Talk show host	WrestleMania V	Guest on Roddy Piper's "Piper's Pit", an in-ring talk show segment	
Gennifer Flowers	Model	WrestleMania XIV	Guest ring announcer and interviewer	
Mary Hart	Entertainment Tonight host	WrestleMania III	Interviewer, guest timekeeper	
John Menick as Herb	Portrayed Herb in Burger King's "Where's Herb?"	WrestleMania 2	Guest timekeeper at Nassau Veterans Memorial Coliseum in Uniondale, New York	
IShowSpeed	Internet personality	WrestleMania XL	Helped Logan Paul while dressed up as a bottle of Prime and got RKO'd by Randy Orton	
IShowSpeed	Internet personality	WrestleMania 42	Participated in a six-man tag match with Logan Paul and Austin Theory against LA Knight and The Usos.	
Kim Kardashian	Reality TV star	WrestleMania XXIV	Hostess	
KSI	YouTuber, professional boxer, musician and internet personality	WrestleMania 39	Helped Logan Paul while dressed up as a bottle of Prime and got frog splashed through the announcers table by Seth "Freakin" Rollins	
Robin Leach	Lifestyles of the Rich and Famous host	WrestleMania IV	Read the rules of the tournament and Presented the WWF Championship to Randy Savage after Savage won it in a tournament	
G. Gordon Liddy	Political figure/radio talk show host	WrestleMania 2	Judge for boxing match between Mr. T and Roddy Piper	
Maria Menounos	Television host	WrestleMania XXVIII	Teamed up with Kelly Kelly to defeat Beth Phoenix and Eve Torres	
Maria Menounos	Television host	WrestleMania 31	Guest interviewer	
Maria Menounos	Television host	WrestleMania 32	Guest interviewer	
Maria Menounos	Television host	WrestleMania 33	Guest interviewer	
Clara Peller	Star of Wendy's "Where's the Beef?" commercials	WrestleMania 2	Guest timekeeper at the Rosemont Horizon in Rosemont, Illinois	
Regis Philbin	Morning TV talk show host	WrestleMania VII	Guest commentator for the main event between Hulk Hogan and Sergeant Slaughter	
Brian Quinn	Comedian	WrestleMania 35	Appeared on the pre-show	
Nicole "Snookie" Polizzi	Reality TV star	WrestleMania XXVII	Participated in a six-person mixed tag team match with Trish Stratus and John Morrison against LayCool (Layla and Michelle McCool) and Dolph Ziggler	
Zuleyka Rivera	Beauty queen	WrestleMania 23	Escorted Donald Trump to the ring during the "Battle of the Billionaires"	
The Rockettes	Dance company	WrestleMania I	Escorted guest timekeeper Liberace to the ring	
George Steinbrenner	New York Yankees owner	WrestleMania VII	Involved in a skit	
Alex Trebek	Game show host	WrestleMania VII	Guest ring announcer	
Donald Trump	Businessman; Host of The Apprentice; 45th and 47th President of The United States	WrestleMania IV	His owned venue hosted the event	
Donald Trump	Businessman; Host of The Apprentice; 45th and 47th President of The United States	WrestleMania V	His owned venue hosted the event	
Donald Trump	Businessman; Host of The Apprentice; 45th and 47th President of The United States	WrestleMania VII	Interviewed in the crowd	
Donald Trump	Businessman; Host of The Apprentice; 45th and 47th President of The United States	WrestleMania XX	Interviewed in the crowd	
Donald Trump	Businessman; Host of The Apprentice; 45th and 47th President of The United States	WrestleMania 23	Was physically involved in WrestleMania 23 with the "Battle of the Billionaires."	
Sal Vulcano	Comedian	WrestleMania 35	Appeared on the pre-show	
Sy Sperling	Hair Club For Men owner	WrestleMania X	Gave a hairpiece to WWF ring announcer Howard Finkel	
Vanna White	Game show hostess	WrestleMania IV	Guest timekeeper	
Keith Colburn	Captain of the FV Wizard (Deadliest Catch)	WrestleMania XXVIII	Appeared in a backstage segment with Santino Marella and Mick Foley	
Al Roker	Today Show weatherman	WrestleMania 33	Guest ring announcer	
