= WrestleMania 35 =

2019 WWE pay-per-view and livestreaming event

- Promotional poster featuring various WWE wrestlers
- Promotion: WWE
- Brand(s): Raw; SmackDown; 205 Live
- Date: April 7, 2019
- City: East Rutherford, New Jersey
- Venue: MetLife Stadium
- Attendance: 68,000–70,000

WWE event chronology
← Previous; NXT TakeOver: New York	Next → The Shield's Final Chapter

WrestleMania chronology
← Previous; 34	Next → 36

WrestleMania 35 was a 2019 professional wrestling pay-per-view (PPV) and livestreaming event produced by WWE, held for wrestlers from the promotion's main roster brands, Raw, SmackDown, and 205 Live. It was the 35th annual WrestleMania and took place on April 7, 2019, at MetLife Stadium in the New York metropolitan area city of East Rutherford, New Jersey.

This was the second WrestleMania held at this venue after WrestleMania 29 in 2013. It was also the first WrestleMania since WrestleMania 2000 to not feature The Undertaker. This was the last WrestleMania to include 205 Live, and it was the final WrestleMania to be held as a one-night event, as beginning with WrestleMania 36 the following year, WrestleMania was expanded to two nights.

The card comprised 16 matches, including four on the Kickoff pre-show. In the main event, which was the first-ever women's main event match in WrestleMania history, Becky Lynch defeated Raw Women's Champion Ronda Rousey and SmackDown Women's Champion Charlotte Flair in a Winner Takes All triple threat match to win both championships. In a main match from SmackDown, Kofi Kingston defeated Daniel Bryan to win his first WWE Championship, and in the opening bout, which was a main match from Raw, Seth Rollins defeated Brock Lesnar to win his first Universal Championship.

The event also saw the final matches of two veteran wrestlers: Kurt Angle lost his farewell match against Baron Corbin, and Batista lost a No Holds Barred match against Triple H and retired after the event. Additionally, this was the final WrestleMania to feature Triple H as an in-ring competitor as he retired in 2022 due to a cardiac event. This also marked the last time the André the Giant Memorial Battle Royal was contested at a WrestleMania itself as although the match was not held in 2020 due to the COVID-19 pandemic, it has since been held on the SmackDown the night before WrestleMania beginning in 2021. It would also be the final WrestleMania to feature the WrestleMania Women's Battle Royal. It was also the first WrestleMania to feature the WWE Women's Tag Team Championship.

== Production ==
=== Background ===
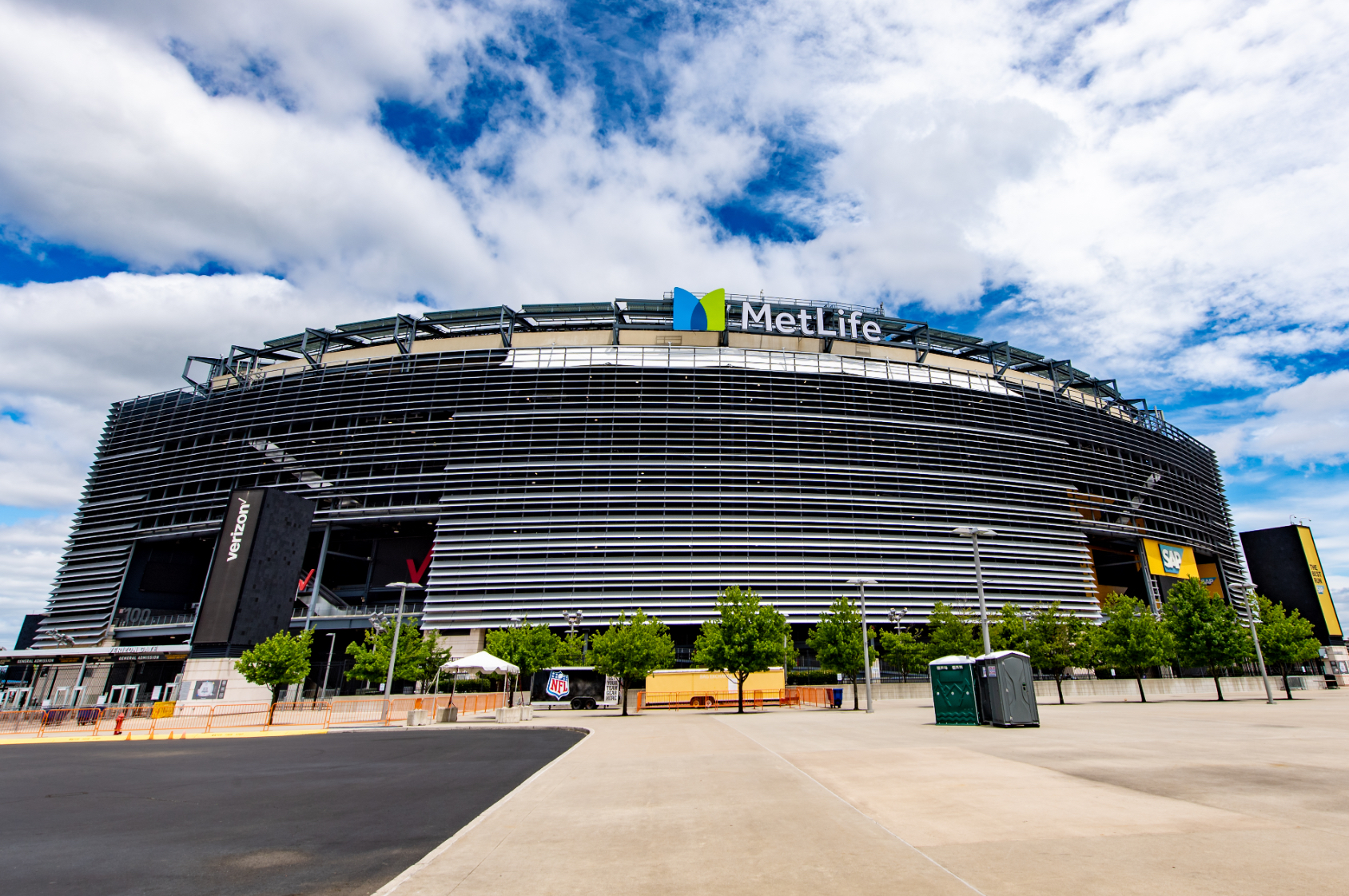
The 35th annual WrestleMania was the second time for WWE's marquee event to be held at MetLife Stadium in East Rutherford, New Jersey, after WrestleMania 29 in 2013.

WrestleMania is WWE's flagship professional wrestling pay-per-view (PPV) and livestreaming event, having first been held in 1985. It was the company's first pay-per-view produced and was also WWE's first major event available via livestreaming when the company launched the WWE Network in 2014. It is the longest-running professional wrestling event in history and is held annually between mid-March to mid-April. It was the first of WWE's original four PPVs, which includes Royal Rumble, SummerSlam, and Survivor Series, referred to as the "Big Four". WrestleMania was ranked the sixth most valuable sports brand in the world by Forbes in 2017, and has been described as the Super Bowl of sports entertainment. Much like the Super Bowl, cities bid for the right to host the year's edition of WrestleMania.

Announced on March 15, 2018, WrestleMania 35 was scheduled to be held on April 7, 2019, at MetLife Stadium in East Rutherford, New Jersey, located in the New York metropolitan area. It featured wrestlers from the Raw, SmackDown, and 205 Live brands. It was the second WrestleMania held at MetLife Stadium, after WrestleMania 29 in 2013, the fourth to be held in the state of New Jersey, after WrestleMania IV in 1988, WrestleMania V in 1989, and WrestleMania 29, and the sixth in the New York metropolitan area, after WrestleMania I in 1985, the first portion of WrestleMania 2 in 1986, WrestleMania X in 1994, WrestleMania XX in 2004, and WrestleMania 29.

There were two official theme songs for the event: "Love Runs Out" by OneRepublic, which served as the main theme, and "Work" by Chris Classic, which served as a secondary theme. There was also a theme song for the main event, "White Flag" by Bishop Briggs. On November 5, 2018, traveling packages for the event were sold while tickets went on sale on November 16, 2018. On the March 11 episode of Monday Night Raw, active WWE wrestler Alexa Bliss was revealed as the host of WrestleMania 35. On the following episode, Elias announced that he would have a musical performance at the event.

Multiple celebrities took part in the event. On the March 4 episode of Raw, Colin Jost and Michael Che of Saturday Night Live were introduced as special correspondents for the event, and were later entered into the André the Giant Memorial Battle Royal. Joan Jett performed her song "Bad Reputation" live for Ronda Rousey's ring entrance. Gospel music star and syndicated radio host Yolanda Adams performed "America the Beautiful" to begin the main show.

=== Storylines ===
The event comprised 16 matches, including four on the Kickoff pre-show, that resulted from scripted storylines. Results were predetermined by WWE's writers on the Raw, SmackDown, and 205 Live brands, while storylines were produced on WWE's weekly television shows, Monday Night Raw, SmackDown Live, and the cruiserweight-exclusive 205 Live.

==== Main event match ====
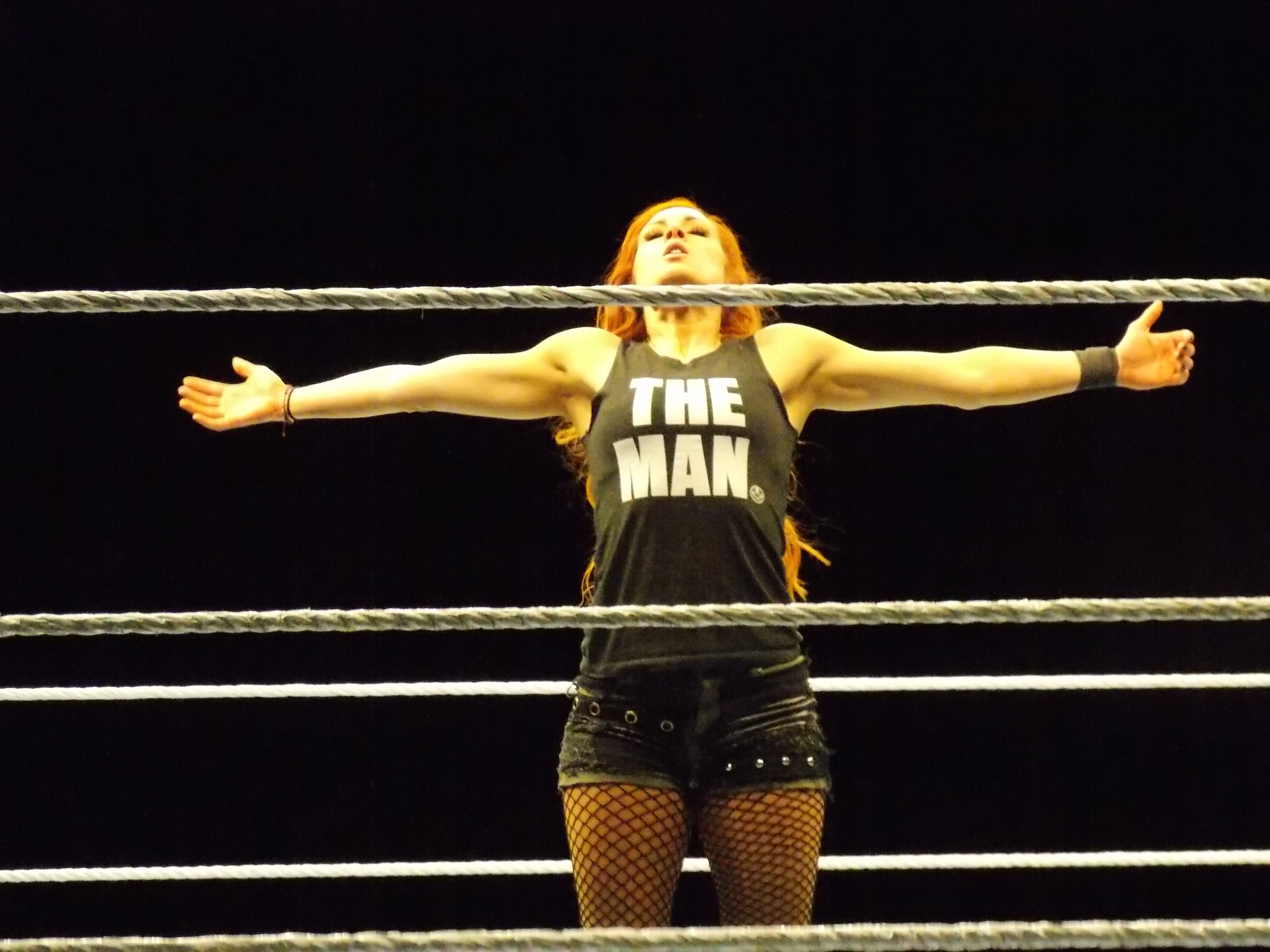
Becky Lynch won the 2019 Women's Royal Rumble match and chose to face Ronda Rousey for the Raw Women's Championship at WrestleMania 35. She was replaced by Charlotte Flair, but found her way back into the match, which became Winner Takes All after Flair won the SmackDown Women's Championship.

At SummerSlam, Becky Lynch and Charlotte Flair were involved in a triple threat match for the SmackDown Women's Championship against defending champion Carmella, which Flair won. Afterwards, Lynch attacked Flair, ending their friendship. Lynch defeated Flair for the championship at Hell in a Cell and successfully defended her title against Flair in a Last Woman Standing Match at the inaugural all women's pay-per-view Evolution. At Survivor Series, Lynch was originally scheduled to face Raw's Ronda Rousey in a non-title match, but was replaced by Flair due to a legit injury; during the match, Flair brutally attacked Rousey with weapons. Rousey then interfered in a tables, ladders, and chairs championship match between Lynch, Flair, and Asuka at the namesake event, costing both Lynch and Flair the match. Lynch failed to regain the title at the Royal Rumble, but won the women's Royal Rumble match by last eliminating Flair, despite injuring her own knee, and chose to face Rousey for the Raw Women's Championship at WrestleMania.

Lynch was then suspended for refusing a medical examination on her knee. After getting medically cleared, however, Vince McMahon suspended her again and introduced Flair as Rousey's WrestleMania opponent. Over the following weeks, Lynch continued to violate her suspension and attacked both Rousey and Flair until the suspension was lifted. At Fastlane, Lynch defeated Flair by disqualification when Rousey attacked Lynch. Per the stipulation, Lynch was added back into the championship match at WrestleMania to make it a triple threat match. After Flair defeated Asuka for the SmackDown Women's Championship, the WrestleMania match was made Winner Takes All with both titles on the line. The match was also confirmed as the first-ever women's match to main event WrestleMania. On the April 1 episode of Raw, Rousey, Lynch, and Flair won a six-woman tag team match; the first person to betray the other would have been removed from the match. After the match, all three brawled, even while handcuffed, and were taken out by police. On SmackDown the next night, Lynch recapped her road to WrestleMania and promised to win the Raw and SmackDown women's championships.

==== Men's world championship matches ====
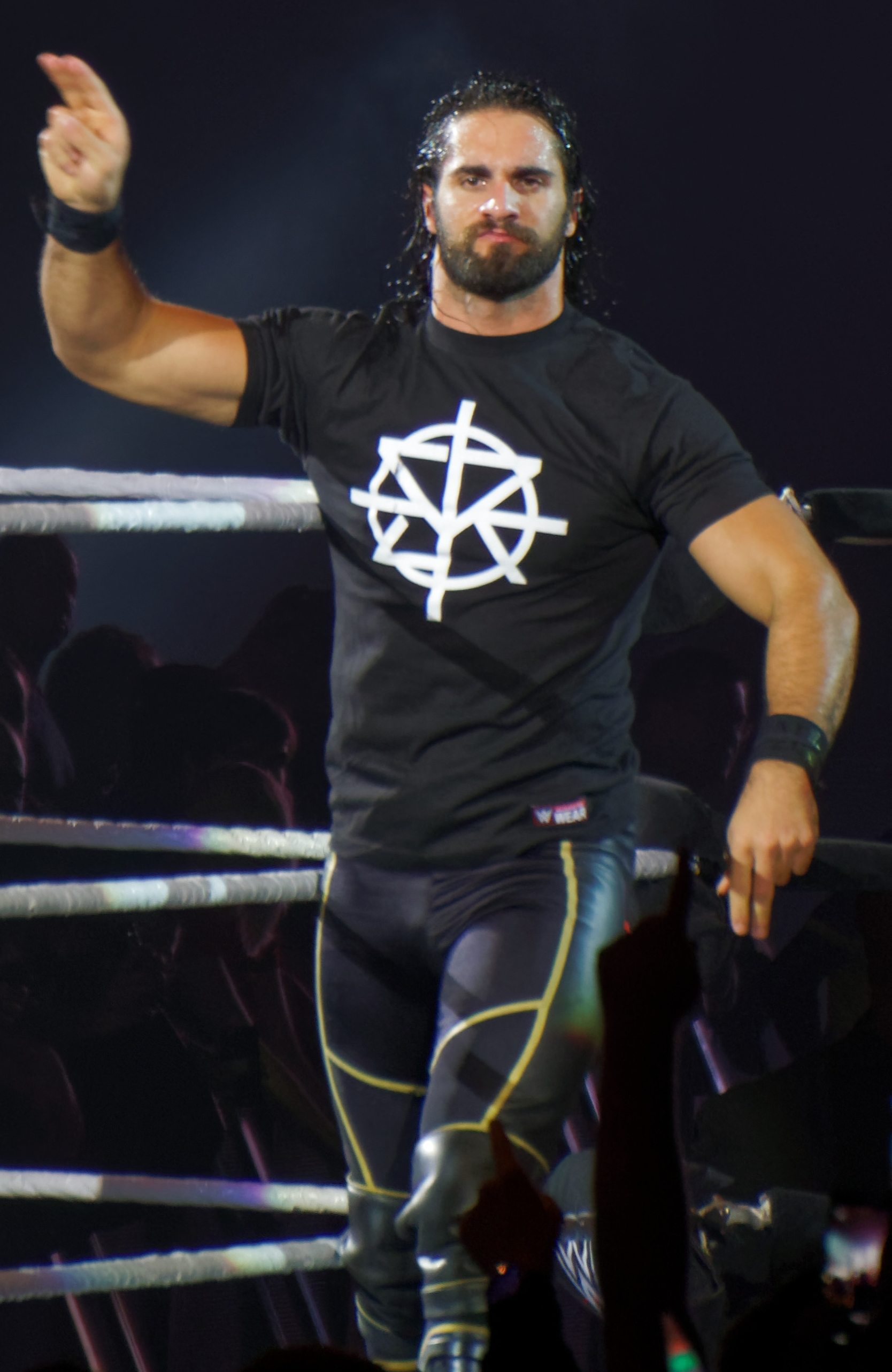
Seth Rollins won the 2019 Men's Royal Rumble match and challenged Brock Lesnar for Raw's Universal Championship at WrestleMania 35.

At the Royal Rumble, Raw's Seth Rollins won the men's Royal Rumble match, earning a world championship match of his choice at WrestleMania. The next night on Raw, Universal Champion Brock Lesnar's advocate Paul Heyman tried to discourage Rollins from challenging Lesnar, leading to a brawl between Rollins and Lesnar. Subsequently, Rollins chose to challenge Lesnar for the Universal Championship at WrestleMania.

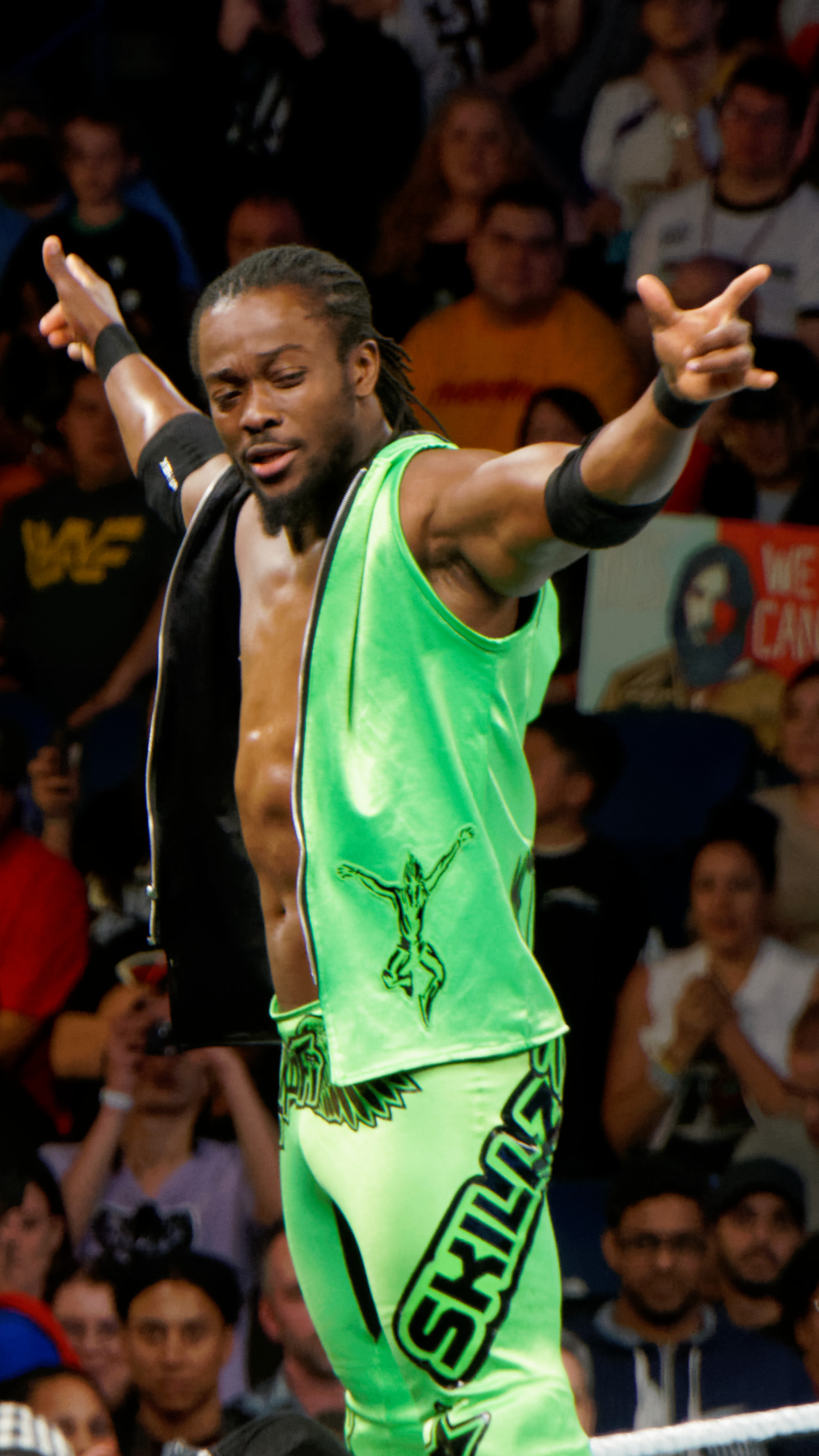
Despite Vince McMahon repeatedly attempting to prevent it, Kofi Kingston faced Daniel Bryan for SmackDown's WWE Championship at WrestleMania 35, his first one-on-one world title opportunity after 11 years in WWE.

On the January 29 episode of SmackDown Live, WWE Champion Daniel Bryan threw the standard title belt in a garbage can (bemoaning the fact it was made from leather) and introduced a new belt, made from "entirely sustainable materials" and unofficially renamed the title as the WWE Planet's Championship and started calling himself "The Planet's Champion". On the February 12 episode of SmackDown, Kofi Kingston replaced an injured Mustafa Ali in a gauntlet match to determine who would enter last in the Elimination Chamber match for the WWE Championship at Elimination Chamber; during the bout, Kingston pinned Bryan in the first part of the gauntlet. At the event, Bryan retained the title by last eliminating Kingston. On the following SmackDown, Kingston was granted a WWE Championship match at Fastlane after pinning Bryan in a six-man tag team match, however, Vince McMahon replaced Kingston with the returning Kevin Owens. On the SmackDown following Fastlane, The New Day (Big E, Kingston, and Xavier Woods) confronted Mr. McMahon for tricking Kingston into believing that he was added back into the title match at Fastlane. Mr. McMahon decided that if Kingston won a gauntlet match, he would receive a WWE Championship match against Bryan at WrestleMania. Kingston subsequently won the gauntlet match, however, Mr. McMahon added one more opponent, which was the WWE Champion himself, who defeated Kingston. On the March 26 episode, The New Day teased leaving WWE and once again confronted Mr. McMahon, who decided that Kingston would in fact receive the championship match if Big E and Woods won a tag team gauntlet match, which they subsequently did. Kingston stated that after he won the title, he would restore the WWE Planet's Championship as the WWE Championship.

==== Undercard matches ====
On SmackDown 1000 on October 16, 2018, Batista, who had last wrestled in WWE in 2014, took part in an Evolution reunion. He praised fellow Evolution member Triple H for having done everything in the wrestling business except defeat him. Batista then attacked fellow Evolution member Ric Flair before the latter's 70th birthday celebration on the February 25, 2019, episode of Raw, seeking Triple H's attention. Batista demanded a final match against Triple H at WrestleMania; Triple H accepted and made the stipulation a No Holds Barred match. Batista accused Triple H of always having kept him down, and demanded that Triple H put his career on the line and Triple H agreed.

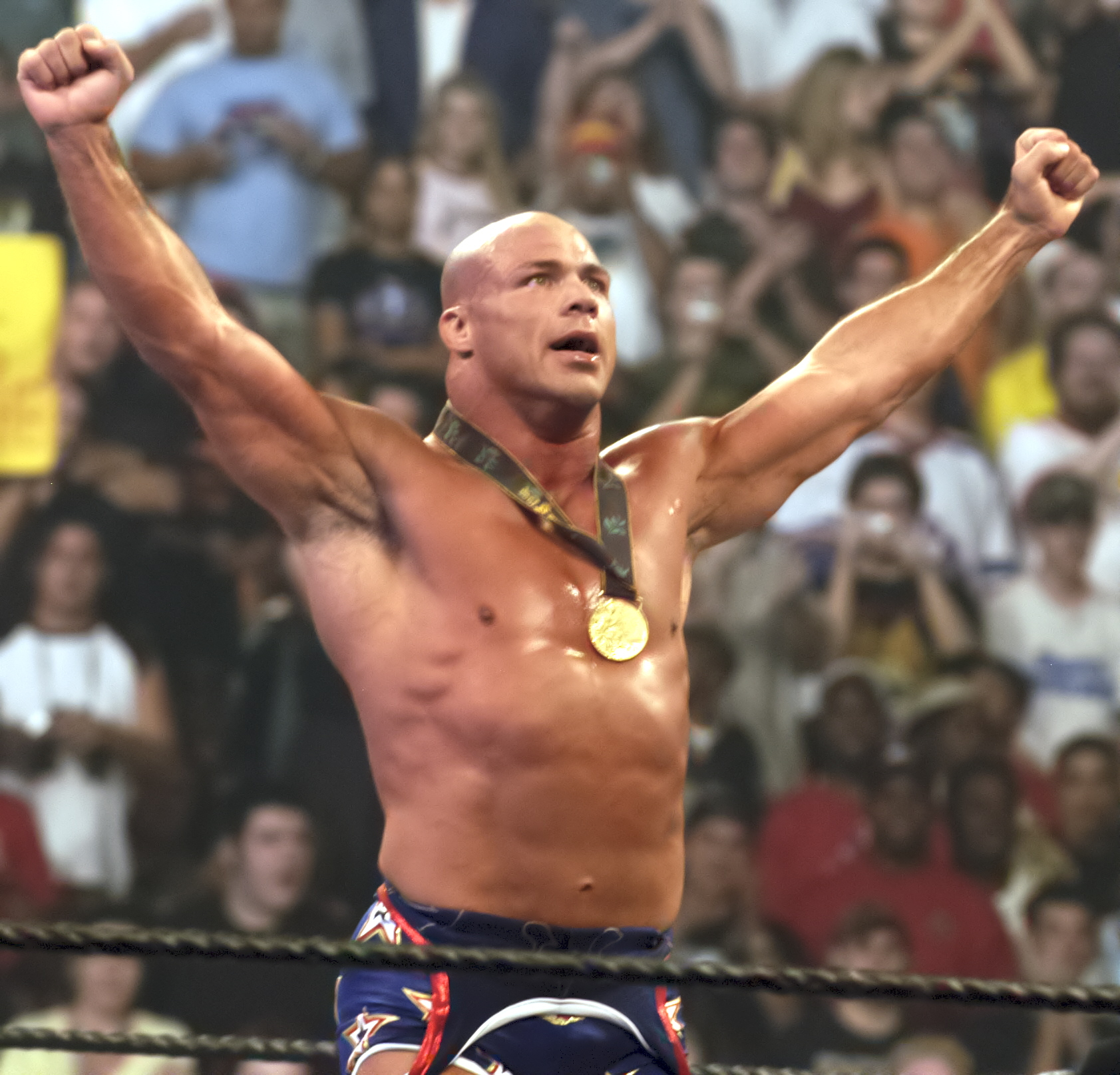
Kurt Angle had his farewell match at WrestleMania 35 against Baron Corbin.

On the March 11 episode of Raw, WWE Hall of Famer Kurt Angle began his farewell tour, culminating with his farewell match at WrestleMania. The following week, Angle chose Baron Corbin as his final opponent as Corbin had caused Angle many problems during the latter's tenure as Raw General Manager (2017–2018) and eventually supplanted him, temporarily becoming Acting Raw General Manager.

At Crown Jewel, Shane McMahon won the WWE World Cup, replacing The Miz in the finals, who was unable to compete after a pre-match brawl. Following this, The Miz and Shane formed a tag team. They won the SmackDown Tag Team Championship at the Royal Rumble, however, they lost the titles at Elimination Chamber. After failing to recapture the titles at Fastlane, Shane attacked Miz and Miz's father, who was seated in the front row. On SmackDown, Shane accused Miz of using him and he wanted to beat him up again, and challenged Miz to a match at WrestleMania. The following week, Miz challenged Shane to make their match falls count anywhere and Shane agreed.

At Fastlane, Samoa Joe retained the United States Championship in a fatal four-way match by making Rey Mysterio pass out to the Coquina Clutch. On the following episode of SmackDown, Mysterio pinned Joe in a tag team match. The following week, Mysterio announced that he would be facing Joe for the title at WrestleMania 35.

After weeks of disparaging comments about one another, Randy Orton eliminated AJ Styles in the Elimination Chamber match for the WWE Championship. At Fastlane, Orton attacked Elias from behind only for Styles to attack him. On the following SmackDown, Orton took umbrage with Styles referring to SmackDown as "the house that AJ Styles built," as Orton began his WWE career on SmackDown in 2002, whereas Styles spent most of that time on the independent circuit until his WWE debut in 2016. Styles responded that Orton had everything handed to him while Styles had to actually work for it. He challenged Orton to a match at WrestleMania and Orton accepted.

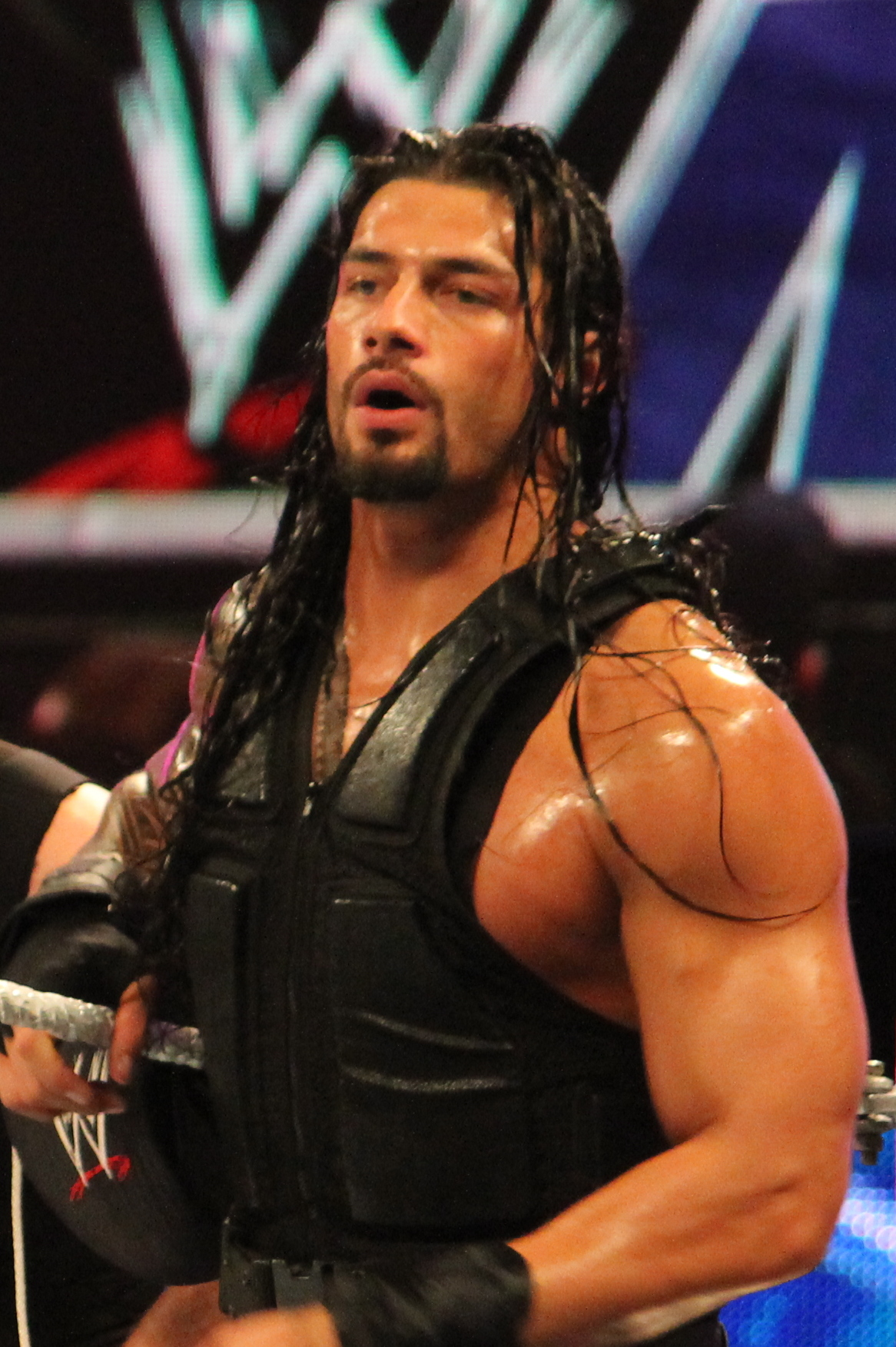
After his return from battling leukemia, Roman Reigns was constantly taunted by Drew McIntyre, who challenged Reigns to a match at WrestleMania 35, Reigns's first singles match in six months.

Roman Reigns, who had been on hiatus due to leukemia since October 2018, returned on the February 25, 2019, episode of Raw and stated that his leukemia was in remission. After Fastlane, Drew McIntyre attacked Reigns, defeated fellow Shield member Dean Ambrose in a Falls Count Anywhere match, defeated fellow Shield member Seth Rollins, and then challenged Reigns to a match at WrestleMania. McIntyre claimed that he destroyed The Shield and brought up Reigns' leukemia and family, prompting Reigns to accept the challenge.

After becoming the inaugural WWE Women's Tag Team Champions at Elimination Chamber, The Boss 'n' Hug Connection (Bayley and Sasha Banks) stated that they would defend the titles across Raw, SmackDown, and NXT. They retained their championships against Raw's Nia Jax and Tamina at Fastlane, and were then called out by SmackDown's The IIconics (Billie Kay and Peyton Royce). On the March 18 episode of Raw, WWE Hall of Famer Beth Phoenix came out of retirement to reform her tag team with Natalya and challenge for the championship at WrestleMania. The next night on SmackDown, The IIconics defeated The Boss 'n' Hug Connection in a non-title match. The champions were then scheduled to defend the titles against Jax and Tamina, Phoenix and Natalya, and The IIconics in a fatal four-way tag team match at WrestleMania.

At Elimination Chamber, Finn Bálor defeated Bobby Lashley and Lio Rush in a handicap match to win Lashley's Intercontinental Championship. Lashley regained the title on the March 11 episode of Raw thanks to assistance from Rush. On the March 25 episode, Bálor earned another title match at WrestleMania by defeating Lashley and Jinder Mahal in another handicap match, and Bálor warned Lashley that he would be facing his alternate persona, "The Demon".

On the April 2 episode of SmackDown, WrestleMania host Alexa Bliss informed The Usos (Jey Uso and Jimmy Uso) that while forfeiting their gauntlet match against The New Day (Big E and Xavier Woods) the previous week was honorable, there would be repercussions. She then scheduled them to defend the SmackDown Tag Team Championship at WrestleMania in a fatal four-way tag team match against The Bar (Cesaro and Sheamus), Aleister Black and Ricochet, and Rusev and Shinsuke Nakamura.

==== Pre-show matches ====
On the February 19 episode of 205 Live, General Manager Drake Maverick scheduled an eight-man tournament with the winner facing Buddy Murphy for the WWE Cruiserweight Championship on the WrestleMania 35 Kickoff pre-show. Over the next few weeks, Tony Nese, Drew Gulak, Oney Lorcan, Cedric Alexander, Kalisto, The Brian Kendrick, Humberto Carrillo, and Akira Tozawa competed in the tournament, which was won by Nese.

On the March 4 episode of Raw, Braun Strowman was confronted backstage by Saturday Night Live's Colin Jost and Michael Che; Jost questioned the legitimacy of professional wrestling, resulting in Strowman choke lifting him. The following week, Che and Jost apologized and gifted a brand new car to Strowman only for Strowman to dismantle the car. On the March 25 episode, Strowman challenged Jost to join him in the André the Giant Memorial Battle Royal. Che agreed on Jost's behalf, who in turn agreed that Che would also participate.

== Event ==
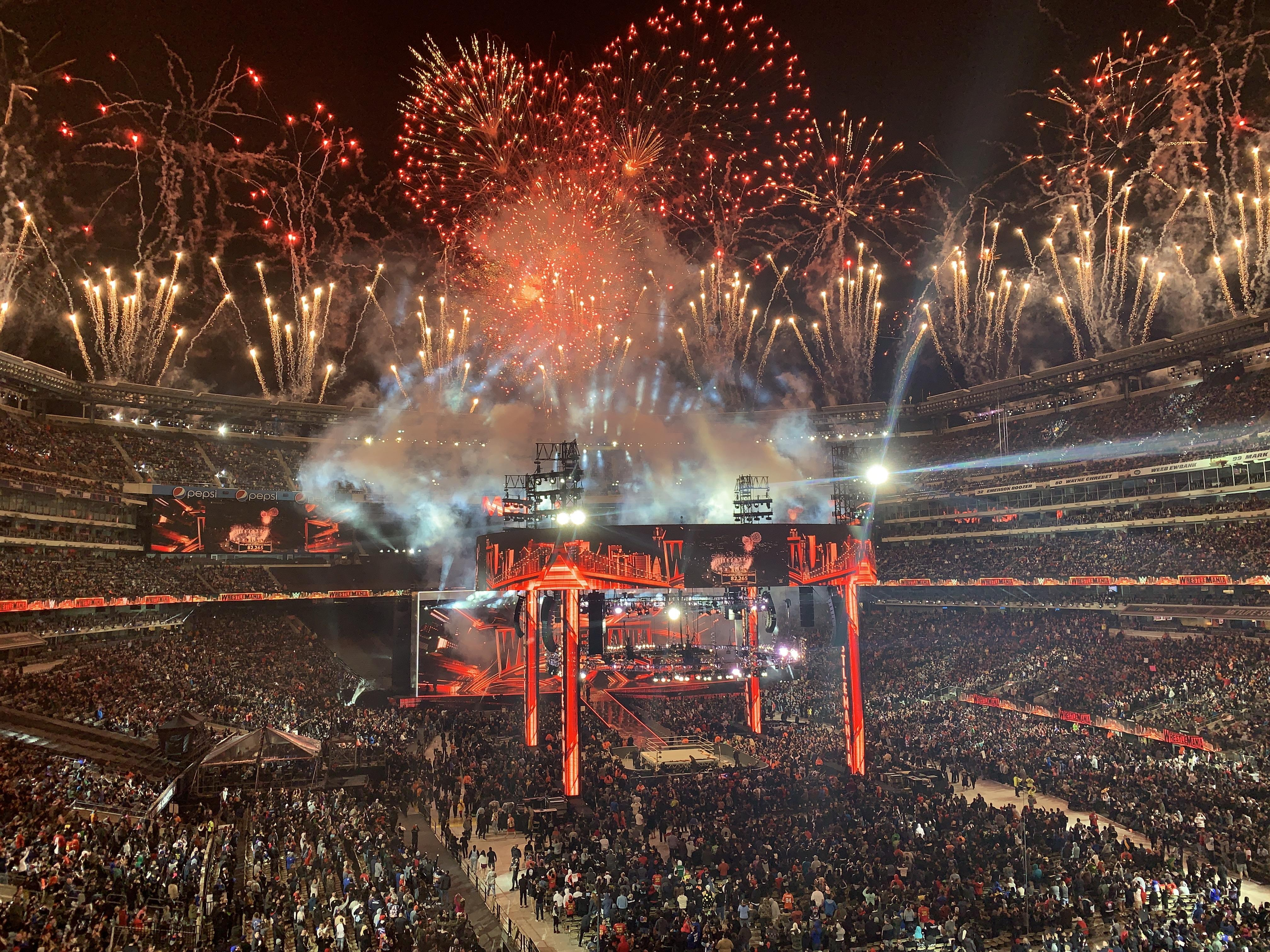
MetLife Stadium during WrestleMania 35

Other on-screen personnel
Role:	Name:
Host	Alexa Bliss
English commentators	Michael Cole (Raw)
English commentators	Corey Graves (Raw/SmackDown)
English commentators	Renee Young (Raw/Women's Battle Royal)
English commentators	Tom Phillips (SmackDown/André Battle Royal)
English commentators	Byron Saxton (SmackDown/André Battle Royal)
English commentators	Vic Joseph (205 Live/Women's Battle Royal)
English commentators	Nigel McGuinness (205 Live)
English commentators	Aiden English (205 Live/André Battle Royal)
English commentators	Percy Watson (Women's Battle Royal)
English commentators	Jerry Lawler (Styles vs. Orton)
English commentators	Paige (Women's Tag Team Title Match)
English commentators	Booker T (United States Title Match)
English commentators	Shawn Michaels (Triple H vs. Batista)
English commentators	John "Bradshaw" Layfield (Angle vs. Corbin)
German commentators	Carsten Schaefer
German commentators	Tim Haber
German commentators	Calvin Knie
Portuguese commentators	Marco Alfaro
Portuguese commentators	Roberto Figueroa
Spanish commentators	Carlos Cabrera
Spanish commentators	Marcelo Rodríguez
Spanish commentators	Jerry Soto
Ring announcers	Greg Hamilton (SmackDown/205 Live)
Ring announcers	Mike Rome (Raw/André Battle Royal)
Ring announcers	Lilian Garcia (Women's Battle Royal)
Referees	Danilo Anfibio
Referees	Jason Ayers
Referees	Shawn Bennett
Referees	Jessika Carr
Referees	Tom Castor
Referees	Mike Chioda
Referees	Dan Engler
Referees	Darrick Moore
Referees	Chad Patton
Referees	Eddie Orengo
Referees	Charles Robinson
Referees	Darryl Sharma
Referees	Ryan Tran
Referees	Drake Wuertz
Referees	Rod Zapata
Interviewer	Kayla Braxton
Pre-show panel	Jonathan Coachman
Pre-show panel	Sam Roberts
Pre-show panel	Paige
Pre-show panel	John "Bradshaw" Layfield
Pre-show panel	Edge
Pre-show panel	Christian
Pre-show panel	Jerry Lawler
Pre-show panel	Shawn Michaels
Pre-show panel	Booker T
Pre-show panel	David Otunga
Pre-show correspondents	Charly Caruso
Pre-show correspondents	Pat McAfee

=== Pre-show ===
Four matches were contested on the two-hour WrestleMania 35 Kickoff pre-show. In the first match, Buddy Murphy defended the WWE Cruiserweight Championship against Tony Nese. In the end, Nese performed a "Running Kneese" on Murphy, who was seated in the corner, to win the title.

The WrestleMania Women's Battle Royal took place next. In the end, Sarah Logan seemingly last eliminated Asuka, but Carmella, who had not actually been eliminated, re-entered the ring and eliminated Logan with a superkick to win the match and the trophy then hugged her father in celebration.

After that, The Revival (Scott Dawson and Dash Wilder) defended the Raw Tag Team Championship against Curt Hawkins and Zack Ryder. In the end, Dawson performed a brainbuster on Hawkins outside the ring, then rolled him back into the ring. Hawkins feigned unconsciousness and then rolled up Dawson to win the titles and end his 269-match losing streak.

The last pre-show match was the André the Giant Memorial Battle Royal. During the majority of the match, WrestleMania correspondents Colin Jost and Michael Che hid under the ring. In the end, as The Hardy Boyz (Jeff Hardy and Matt Hardy) were trying to eliminate Braun Strowman, Che and Jost entered the ring in an attempt to help The Hardy Boyz, however, Strowman overpowered the four and eliminated The Hardy Boyz. Jost attempted to work things out with Strowman by inviting his therapist in the ring, however, Strowman attacked the therapist and then eliminated Che. Strowman then picked Jost up and threw him outside of the ring on top of other wrestlers (participants who also competed in the match and were already eliminated) to win the match and the trophy.

=== Preliminary matches ===
The actual pay-per-view opened with WrestleMania host Alexa Bliss welcoming the crowd. She then brought out Hulk Hogan to hype the crowd for the event. Paul Heyman interrupted the two and marched to the ring. He declared that if Brock Lesnar was not fighting in the main event, he would not wait the entire show for his Universal Championship defense against Seth Rollins and then proceeded to introduce Lesnar. As Rollins approached the ring, he was immediately attacked by Lesnar. After the match officially started, Lesnar delivered several German suplexes to Rollins. Rollins countered an "F-5" attempt and shoved Lesnar into the referee. While the referee was incapacitated, Rollins attacked Lesnar with a low blow followed by a superkick and three "Curb Stomps" to win the title.

Next, AJ Styles faced Randy Orton. During the match, Orton attempted an "RKO", only for Styles to counter several times. Outside the ring, Orton hit Styles with a chair several times targeting his knee. Orton eventually performed an "RKO" for a near-fall. In the end, Styles performed a "Phenomenal Forearm" on Orton outside the ring and again in the ring to win the match.

After that, The Usos defended the SmackDown Tag Team Championship against The Bar (Cesaro and Sheamus), Rusev and Shinsuke Nakamura, and Aleister Black and Ricochet in a fatal four-way tag team match. During the match, Cesaro performed the "Cesaro Swing" on Ricochet for a full minute while Sheamus performed the "Beats of the Bodhrán" on four opponents. A superplex attempt by The Bar developed into a top-rope maneuver involving seven wrestlers. In the end, The Usos delivered a double "Superfly Splash" on Sheamus to retain the titles.

In the following match, The Miz faced Shane McMahon in a falls count anywhere match. During the match, Shane dominated Miz which prompted Miz's dad, who was sitting in the front row, to come into the ring and attempt to fight Shane, however, Shane attacked him. Miz and Shane then fought out into the crowd. In the end, Miz performed a Skull Crushing-Finale on Shane for a near-fall, then Miz performed a superplex on Shane off of a 15-foot camera stage to a lower platform just above the floor. As Shane landed on top of Miz, the referee counted a pinfall, giving the win to Shane.

Next, The Boss 'n' Hug Connection (Bayley and Sasha Banks) defended the WWE Women's Tag Team Championship against Nia Jax & Tamina, The IIconics (Billie Kay and Peyton Royce), and Beth Phoenix & Natalya in a fatal four-way tag team match. In the end, Phoenix performed a "Glam Slam" on Bayley off the top rope. Royce threw Phoenix out of the ring, while Kay, who had tagged Phoenix, pinned Bayley to win the titles.

After that, Daniel Bryan (accompanied by Rowan) defended the WWE Championship against The New Day's Kofi Kingston (accompanied by his teammates Big E and Xavier Woods). During the match, Rowan prevented Kingston from attacking Bryan outside the ring which prompted Big E and Woods to incapacitate Rowan. This allowed Kingston to get Bryan back in the ring. Bryan performed the running knee for a near-fall. Bryan applied the "LeBell Lock", however, Kingston escaped. In the climax, Kingston performed a "Trouble in Paradise" on Bryan to win his first WWE Championship, also becoming WWE's 30th Triple Crown Champion, 20th Grand Slam Champion, and the first world champion of African descent. Kingston celebrated with his sons while Big E and Woods discarded Bryan's custom "eco-friendly" world championship belt and presented Kingston with the standard leather and gold-plated WWE Championship belt.

Next, Samoa Joe defended the United States Championship against Rey Mysterio. Mysterio started with a "619" on Joe. As Mysterio went to capitalize, he was caught by Joe in the "Coquina Clutch" and passed out. Joe retained the title in a one-minute match.

In the following match, Drew McIntyre faced Roman Reigns. McIntyre dominated Reigns most of the match. In the end, as McIntyre attacked Reigns with a "Glasgow Kiss", Reigns bounced off the ropes and performed a superman punch and a spear on McIntyre to win the match.

After that, Elias started his WrestleMania concert. He performed on the guitar while an edited video showing him performing on piano and drum set played simultaneously. He was then interrupted by a Babe Ruth video, followed by John Cena, who came out in his Doctor of Thuganomics gimmick (circa 2002–2004) and sporting a New York Yankees jersey. Cena insulted Elias and then attacked him with an "F-U" (the original name for Cena's "Attitude Adjustment" during his Thuganomics gimmick).

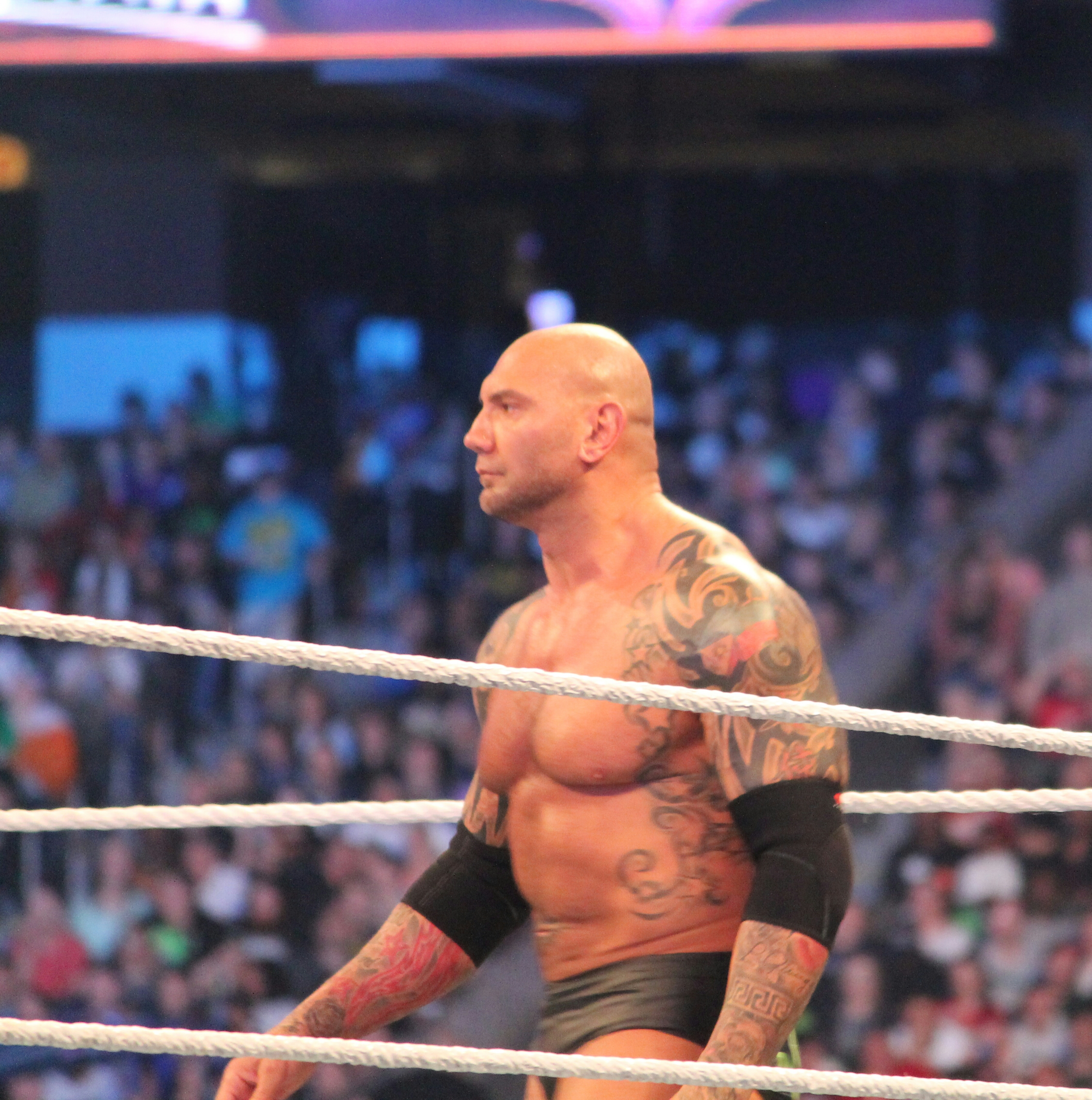
After fighting Triple H in a No Holds Barred match at WrestleMania 35, Batista retired from professional wrestling.

Next, Triple H put his career on the line in a No Holds Barred match against Batista. Early in the match, Triple H pulled out Batista's nose ring with pliers. Later, Batista attempted a "Batista Bomb" on Triple H on a broadcast table, only for Triple H to counter and execute a spear on Batista. Back in the ring, Batista performed a spear and a "Batista Bomb" on Triple H, both resulting in near-falls. Triple H executed a powerbomb on Batista on the ring stairs and a "Pedigree" for another near-fall. The end came when Ric Flair appeared and handed Triple H his signature sledgehammer. Triple H struck Batista with the sledgehammer and followed it up with a second "Pedigree" to win the match. Triple H kept his in-ring career intact while Batista announced his retirement from professional wrestling shortly after the event.

After that, Baron Corbin faced Kurt Angle in Angle's farewell match. During the match, Corbin performed a Deep Six on Angle for a nearfall. Angle applied an Ankle lock, but Corbin was able to escape and send Angle into a turnbuckle. In the closing moments, Angle performed three German Suplexes and went for a moonsault, but Corbin moved out of the way and performed the "End of Days" on Angle to win the match. Following the match, Angle delivered a short retirement speech, thanking the fans.

In the penultimate match, Bobby Lashley (accompanied by Lio Rush) defended the Intercontinental Championship against Finn Bálor in his "Demon" persona. Lashley performed a spear on Bálor through the ropes and then again in the ring for a near-fall. In the climax, Bálor performed a powerbomb and the "Coup de Grâce" on Lashley to regain the title for a second time.

=== Main event ===
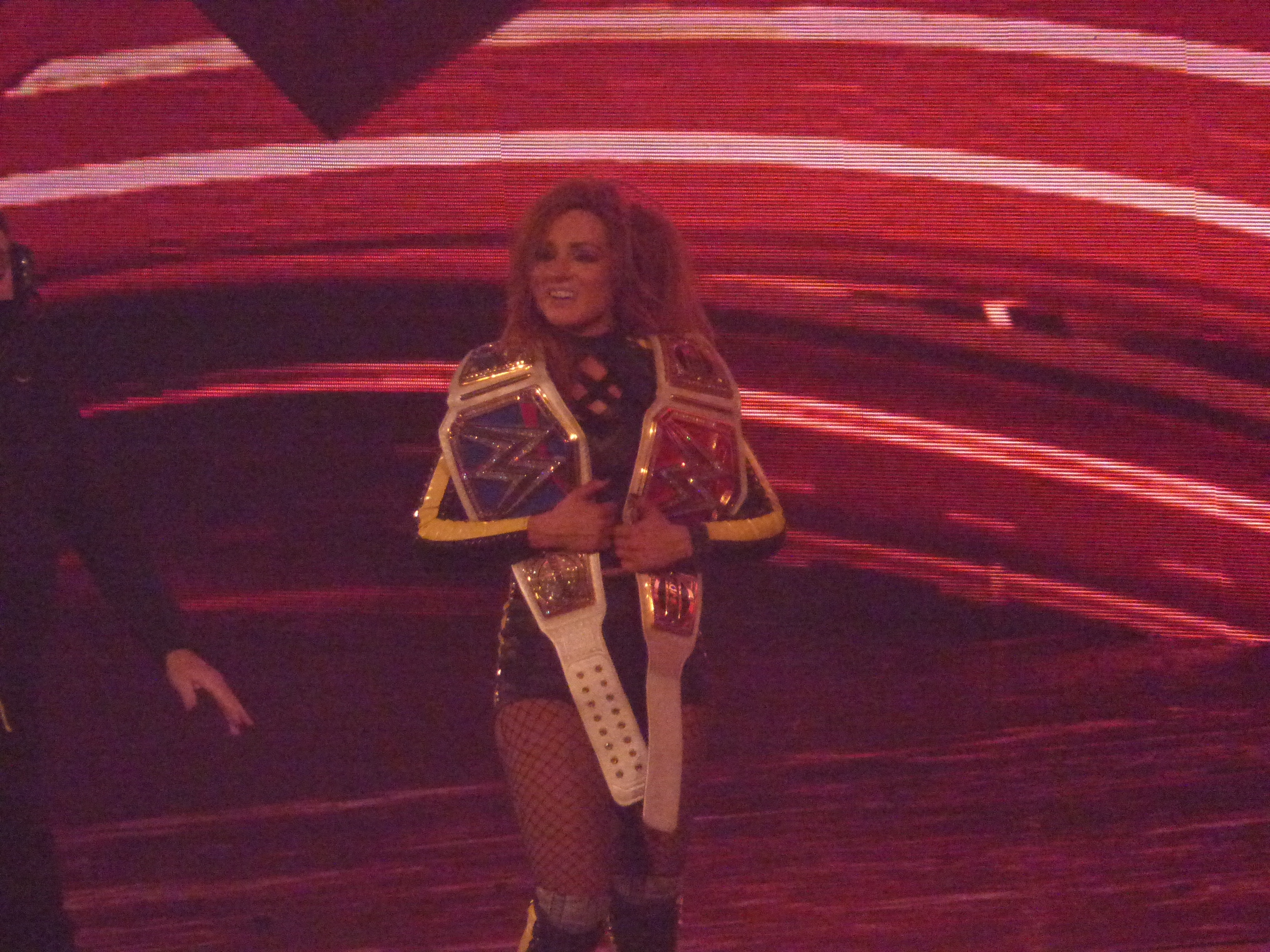
Becky Lynch defeated Ronda Rousey and Charlotte Flair in the main event to become Raw and SmackDown Women's Champion.

The main event was the first women's main event match in WrestleMania history; Becky Lynch faced Raw Women's Champion Ronda Rousey and SmackDown Women's Champion Charlotte Flair in a Winner Takes All triple threat match for both titles. Rousey dominated the start of the match. This continued until Flair and Lynch lifted Rousey over the top rope. While Rousey was still applying an armbar on Flair, Lynch kicked her off, causing her to have a hard landing. Flair and Lynch exchanged blows until Rousey broke it up. After a pinning attempt by Flair on Rousey resulted in a nearfall, Flair countered an armbar attempt by Rousey into a Boston Crab, but Lynch performed a bulldog on Flair. Lynch then performed DDTs on Flair and Rousey simultaneously for nearfalls. Lynch then performed an Exploder suplex on Flair from the middle rope for a nearfall. Lynch and Flair then performed three powerbombs on Rousey. Flair threw Lynch out and covered Rousey for a nearfall. Lynch then applied the Dis-arm-her on Rousey, who made it to the ring ropes, but Lynch still kept the submission applied. Flair then performed a Spanish Fly on Lynch for a nearfall. Flair then applied the figure-four leglock on Rousey around the ring post. Flair then sent Lynch into the ringside barricade. Rousey countered a figure-four attempt by Flair into a roll-up for a nearfall. Flair locked in the "Figure-Eight Leglock" on Rousey, only for Lynch to break up the hold. Lynch then retrieved a table, but Rousey tossed it away. Flair then performed a Spear on Lynch and Rousey at the same time, but it resulted in nearfalls. In the closing moments, Flair performed another Spear on Lynch for a nearfall. Flair went for the same move, but Lynch and Rousey put Flair through a table. Lynch and Rousey then went after each other, and Rousey got the upper hand. Rousey then performed the "Piper's Pit" on Lynch, who countered into a crucifix – Rousey's first pinfall loss – to win both the Raw and SmackDown Women's Championships—her first Raw Women's Championship and record-tying third SmackDown Women's Championship. The match began after midnight Eastern Time, thus Lynch won the match on April 8.

== Reception ==
The event received fairly positive reviews from critics and viewers alike. Much criticism, however, was drawn towards the overall runtime of the event. Including the pre-show, the event clocked in at 7.5 hours, making it the longest pay-per-view the company ever produced prior to the introduction of two-night WrestleManias. The Becky Lynch–Ronda Rousey–Charlotte Flair and Kofi Kingston–Daniel Bryan storylines were also criticized in general for being too similar to Daniel Bryan's storyline for WrestleMania XXX against The Authority, although Lynch's and Kingston's rises were seen as a positive and largely supported by the fanbase.

Brian Campbell of CBS Sports directed praise towards the WWE Championship match between Daniel Bryan and Kofi Kingston, saying "After 11 long years, there is no trouble at all for Kingston, only paradise. The WWE veteran and one-third of The New Day pulled off an inspiring victory for the ages to cap off an amazing bit of storytelling following an unlikely and organic bid. Crowning Kingston as just the second male African-American WWE champion in the promotion's history certainly wasn't on the books as recently as two months ago but the combination of Kingston's in-ring performances and the undying support of the crowd made it the right thing to do". He also directed praise towards the Falls Count Anywhere match between Shane McMahon and The Miz, saying "As far as car wrecks go, this one was an artistic masterpiece. Not only did The Miz bring enough hatred and aggression to match the angle of protecting his father from McMahon, the creative use of the stadium for the match stipulation turned out to be brilliant".

Dave Meltzer of the Wrestling Observer stated that the main event was "good", but the controversial way the match ended lead him to believe "that Rousey will be back for at least another show because Corey Graves was pointing out how this wasn't the way he'd want WrestleMania to end." He noted that the Styles-Orton match wasn't "as good as you'd expect from these two", calling it a "slow deliberate match" that "never reached a fever pitch." However, Meltzer loved the Kingston-Bryan match, calling it a great match stating, "this blew away everything" at that point. He also liked the Rollins-Lesnar match stating that, despite its short length, "this tore down the house with the quick all big moves match like a Lesnar-Goldberg style." Meltzer felt the SmackDown Tag Team Championship match "could have been a classic if given more time", praising the Cesaro Swing to Ricochet, the tower of doom superplex spot and the Double Superfly splash in the end. Meltzer also felt the Reigns-McIntyre match "wasn't much" and that it was McIntyre doing most of the heavy work. He also stated that "Reigns looked tons better at Fastlane".

Joshua Needelman of The Washington Post said the fans "got the result they wanted" for the main event match, but stated that the ending "felt anticlimactic. It was Rousey's first time being pinned in WWE, yes, but it was hardly a definitive pin". Needleman noted in the Kingston-Bryan match that the crowd "exploded, bouncing up and down in their seats, as Big E and Xavier Woods...stormed the ring to celebrate". He also felt that Ric Flair's interference in the Triple H-Batista match felt "poetic, given the beef started when Batista beat up Flair on the legend's 70th birthday". Needelman praised the superplex spot at the end of the Miz-McMahon match, stating it "was a shocking moment, one made for highlight reels". He gave special praise to Ricochet in the SmackDown Tag Team Championship match stating that "Ricochet provided an array of jaw-dropping moves in the short match". He stated that the Styles-Orton match was "a true clash of wrestling personalities" and that both men "delivered an entertaining match that was slow early but picked up as the action wore on".

Wade Keller of Pro Wrestling Torch called the main event "a hell of a match" claiming it had "great pacing throughout" and was "non-stop drama". He stated the Universal Championship match was "not much of a match at all, which is always disappointing". He also stated that the crowd cheered, not really for the match, but rather for the "end of the Universal Title being around the waist of someone who they have been swayed to believe doesn't want to be there". Keller felt that the SmackDown Tag Team Championship match had "lots of action", but concluded that with that many wrestlers, "it's more about the spots than telling a usual story". Keller also loved the Kingston–Bryan match calling it "straight forward, with the heel getting a sustained beatdown and eventually the babyface scoring a clean win with a finishing move". Keller noted that there was a lot of indifference from the crowd during Reigns–McIntyre match and that it was "paced in a way that reenforced that indifference". He concluded that the match "did nothing to get fans who weren't really excited about Roman any more excited that this is some new chapter for him".

== Aftermath ==
=== Raw ===
The following night on Raw, new Raw and SmackDown Women's Champion Becky Lynch thanked the fans for their support and warned Ronda Rousey that she would be waiting for a rematch when Rousey returned from her post-WrestleMania hiatus. Lynch was subsequently attacked by Lacey Evans, who was drafted to Raw during the Superstar Shake-up and defeated Natalya to become the number one contender for the Raw Women's Championship at Money in the Bank. Charlotte Flair also earned a rematch for the SmackDown Women's Championship at the same event by defeating new SmackDown draftee Bayley.

New Universal Champion Seth Rollins proclaimed that, unlike Brock Lesnar, he would be a fighting champion. He was then interrupted by The New Day; new WWE Champion Kofi Kingston challenged Rollins to a "Winner Takes All" match that Rollins accepted, but the match ended in disqualification when The Bar (Sheamus and Cesaro) attacked Kingston. This led to a tag team match where Rollins and Kingston defeated The Bar. New Raw draftee AJ Styles then earned a Universal Championship match against Rollins at Money in the Bank, while Kevin Owens began a feud with Kingston, leading to a WWE Championship match at the same event. Before Money in the Bank, former WWE Champion Daniel Bryan received a rematch for the title on the May 6 episode of Raw, but was unsuccessful in regaining the title–although the two were SmackDown wrestlers, Vince McMahon introduced a "wild card rule" allowing up to four wrestlers to appear on the opposing brand's show by invitation going forward.

At Money in the Bank, Brock Lesnar was a surprise entrant in the men's Money in the Bank ladder match at the titular event, and won the match. He then successfully cashed in his contract on Seth Rollins at Extreme Rules to win the Universal Championship for a third time. This led to one more rematch at SummerSlam, where Rollins was victorious.

Baron Corbin boasted about defeating Kurt Angle, who interrupted him. Angle feigned to wish Corbin luck and then performed the Angle Slam and an Ankle Lock on Corbin. NXT's Lars Sullivan then made his main roster debut and attacked Angle. Corbin was later entered into the Money in the Bank ladder match to represent Raw, along with Drew McIntyre, Braun Strowman, and new draftee Ricochet, though Sami Zayn replaced Strowman after defeating the latter. SmackDown's Ali (formerly Mustafa Ali), Andrade, Randy Orton, and new draftee Finn Bálor were also entered into the ladder match.

Elias tried to continue his concert on Raw. He insulted John Cena and warned that the next to interrupt him would be "a dead man". The Undertaker then appeared and delivered a Tombstone Piledriver to Elias. Notably, WrestleMania 35 was the first WrestleMania in 19 years without The Undertaker's involvement, and the first in 29 years The Undertaker (then with WCW) missed a WrestleMania without being injured. Elias was then transferred to SmackDown in the Superstar Shake-up, along with Roman Reigns, and the two began a feud leading to a match at Money in the Bank. Before Money in the Bank, Reigns appeared on the May 6 episode of Raw where he had a WrestleMania rematch with Drew McIntyre, who again lost to Reigns, this time by disqualification.

In the tag team division, The Revival lost their rematch for the Raw Tag Team Championship against Zack Ryder and Curt Hawkins. On SmackDown, The Usos lost their SmackDown Tag Team Championship against The Hardy Boyz. The Usos were then drafted to Raw in the Superstar Shake-up and began a feud with The Revival, but also tried to regain the SmackDown Tag Team Championship after The Hardys relinquished them due to Jeff's injury, but lost to Daniel Bryan and Rowan.

WrestleMania 35 host Alexa Bliss taunted The Boss 'n' Hug Connection for losing their WWE Women's Tag Team Championship and claimed she could defeat either of them and proceeded to defeat Bayley on Raw. The next night on SmackDown, new champions The IIconics vowed to be fighting champions and then retained in a match against local competitors, The Brooklyn Belles. Paige, who was watching backstage, revealed that she would be bringing a new tag team to SmackDown to manage and go after the titles; revealed to be Asuka and NXT call-up Kairi Sane, who would later be known as The Kabuki Warriors. On Raw during the Superstar Shake-up, as Sasha Banks was absent, Bayley teamed with new Raw draftee Naomi and defeated the champions in a non-title match. Bliss, Naomi, Natalya, Dana Brooke, Bayley, Mandy Rose, new SmackDown draftee Ember Moon, and Carmella were later confirmed for the women's Money in the Bank ladder match; for medical reasons, Bliss was replaced by new draftee Nikki Cross.

=== SmackDown ===
On the following episode of SmackDown, Carmella celebrated her winning the WrestleMania Women's Battle Royal with R-Truth only for United States Champion Samoa Joe to interrupt and attack Truth. Joe then boasted that he could beat any challenger quicker than he defeated Rey Mysterio at WrestleMania and then got into a brawl with André the Giant Memorial Battle Royal winner Braun Strowman. Joe and Mysterio were then moved to Raw during the Superstar Shake-up and continued their feud, leading to a title rematch at Money in the Bank.

Following his drafting to the Raw brand in the Superstar Shake-up the following week, The Miz attacked Shane McMahon, seeking retribution. Shane then attacked Miz during a match with Bobby Lashley on the April 29 episode of Raw and Miz later challenged Shane to a Steel Cage match at Money in the Bank that Shane accepted.

On 205 Live, Tony Nese defeated Buddy Murphy in a rematch to retain the WWE Cruiserweight Championship. Murphy was then transferred to SmackDown during the Superstar Shake-up.

=== Transit delays ===
After the event, many fans who had taken NJ Transit to Meadowlands Rail Line and planned to return that way had to wait in the rain for hours. The transit agency had expected that WWE would end the event at 10:30 p.m., as it had told them they expected it to, and planned its staffing needs around that. When the event ran two hours longer, most of those staff had exceeded the limits of their daily work hours as permitted by Federal Railroad Administration regulations, and had gone home, leaving train crews shorthanded. At some points fans threatened to riot if trains did not come; their attempts to get alternative transportation through Uber were also mostly unsuccessful. NJ Transit had expected from 8,000 to 13,000 riders; instead 33,000 headed for the trains after the event.

NJ Transit officials blamed WWE for not telling them until the event had run later than scheduled that it would end after 10:30; some fans agreed with the railroad, recalling that WrestleMania 29 (the last WrestleMania held at MetLife Stadium) had ended around 10 p.m. and there were no problems with the trains. WWE officials responded that they do not plan specific ending times. The failure drew comparisons to similar rail delays that accompanied Super Bowl XLVIII at MetLife Stadium in 2014, which had attracted almost the same number of fans to the Meadowlands.

New Jersey elected officials dismissed the transit agency's response. Upon hearing that NJ Transit had not adequately explained the reason for the delays to the waiting fans, Governor Phil Murphy, who has made a priority of reforming the agency, called that "completely, utterly, dog-ate-my-homework unacceptable." State senator Paul Sarlo of nearby Wood-Ridge, who chairs that body's Budget and Appropriations committee, said the delays hurt the state's reputation. "It sends a bad message that imperils our ability to attract and retain the sports and entertainment events that deliver economic benefits." He suggested that the state could alleviate these problems in the future by completing the loop intended to take event attendees from Secaucus Junction to the Meadowlands; currently trains that take the spur from the Pascack Valley Line to the Meadowlands station must back out of it since the line ends there, causing delays when passenger volume is high.

== Results ==
No.	Results	Stipulations	Times
1^{P}	Tony Nese defeated Buddy Murphy (c) by pinfall	Singles match for the WWE Cruiserweight Championship	10:40
2^{P}	Carmella won by last eliminating Sarah Logan (Note: Order of elimination: Maria Kanellis, Candice LeRae, Nikki Cross, Naomi, Ember Moon, Lana, Kairi Sane, Ruby Riott, Liv Morgan, Zelina Vega, Dana Brooke, Mandy Rose, Mickie James, Sonya Deville, Asuka, Sarah Logan)	17-woman WrestleMania Women's Battle Royal for the WrestleMania Women's Battle Royal Trophy	10:30
3^{P}	Curt Hawkins and Zack Ryder defeated The Revival (Dash Wilder and Scott Dawson) (c) by pinfall	Tag team match for the WWE Raw Tag Team Championship	13:20
4^{P}	Braun Strowman won by last eliminating Colin Jost (Note: Order of elimination: Curtis Axel, Lince Dorado, Tyler Breeze, EC3, Shelton Benjamin, Bo Dallas, Heath Slater, Titus O'Neil, No Way Jose, Karl Anderson, Rhyno, Bobby Roode, Gran Metalik, Kalisto, Chad Gable, Konnor, Viktor, Luke Gallows, Otis, Tucker, Jinder Mahal, Luke Harper, Ali, Apollo Crews, Andrade, Matt Hardy, Jeff Hardy, Michael Che, Colin Jost)	30-man André the Giant Memorial Battle Royal for the André the Giant Memorial Trophy	10:20
5	Seth Rollins defeated Brock Lesnar (c) (with Paul Heyman) by pinfall	Singles match for the WWE Universal Championship	2:30
6	AJ Styles defeated Randy Orton by pinfall	Singles match	16:20
7	The Usos (Jey Uso and Jimmy Uso) (c) defeated Aleister Black and Ricochet, Rusev and Shinsuke Nakamura, and The Bar (Cesaro and Sheamus) by pinfall	Fatal four-way tag team match for the WWE SmackDown Tag Team Championship	10:10
8	Shane McMahon defeated The Miz by pinfall	Falls Count Anywhere match	15:30
9	The IIconics (Billie Kay and Peyton Royce) defeated The Boss 'n' Hug Connection (Bayley and Sasha Banks) (c), Nia Jax and Tamina, and Beth Phoenix and Natalya by pinfall	Fatal four-way tag team match for the WWE Women's Tag Team Championship	10:45
10	Kofi Kingston (with Xavier Woods and Big E) defeated Daniel Bryan (c) (with Rowan) by pinfall	Singles match for the WWE Championship (Note: Going into the match, the title was unofficially being referred to as the WWE Planet's Championship (Bryan's custom eco-friendly world championship belt). It was restored as the standard leather and gold-plated WWE Championship belt upon Kingston's victory.)	23:45
11	Samoa Joe (c) defeated Rey Mysterio by technical submission	Singles match for the WWE United States Championship	0:58
12	Roman Reigns defeated Drew McIntyre by pinfall	Singles match	10:10
13	Triple H defeated Batista by pinfall	No Holds Barred match Had Triple H lost, he would have been forced to retire from in-ring competition.	24:45
14	Baron Corbin defeated Kurt Angle by pinfall	Singles match This was Kurt Angle's retirement match.	6:05
15	"The Demon" Finn Bálor defeated Bobby Lashley (c) (with Lio Rush) by pinfall	Singles match for the WWE Intercontinental Championship	4:05
16	Becky Lynch defeated Ronda Rousey (c-Raw) and Charlotte Flair (c-SmackDown) by pinfall	Winner Takes All triple threat match for the WWE Raw Women's Championship and the WWE SmackDown Women's Championship	21:30
(c) / – the champion(s) heading into the match; P / – the match was broadcast on the pre-show

=== WWE Cruiserweight Championship #1 Contender's Tournament ===
1st Round; 205 Live; February 26 – March 5, 2019
Tony Nese	Pinfall
Kalisto	14:25
The Brian Kendrick	14:20
Drew Gulak	TKO
Humberto Carrillo	12:08
Oney Lorcan	Pinfall
Cedric Alexander	Pinfall
Akira Tozawa	18:09

Semifinals; 205 Live; March 12, 2019
Tony Nese	Pinfall
Drew Gulak	17:20
Oney Lorcan	15:15
Cedric Alexander	Pinfall

Final; 205 Live; March 19, 2019
Tony Nese	Pinfall
Cedric Alexander	22:20
